= DoReMi Market =

South Korean television program

- Promotional poster
- Genre: Variety show Game show Music
- Presented by: Boom
- Starring: See below
- Country of origin: South Korea
- Original language: Korean
- No. of seasons: 1
- No. of episodes: 444 + four special (list of episodes)

Production
- Producer: SM Culture & Contents
- Production location: South Korea
- Running time: 90 minutes
- Production companies: tvN, CJ ENM

Original release
- Network: tvN
- Release: April 7, 2018 – present

DoReMi Market (Korean: 도레미 마켓; RR: Doremi maket), better known as Amazing Saturday (Note: Originally DoReMi Market was named Amazing Saturday. When Prison Life of Fools was announced as the first part of Amazing Saturday, the name "Amazing Saturday" was known as a program with two corner programs. Prison Life of Fools began airing on March 16, 2019 and ended six months later.) (놀라운 토요일; Nollaun toyoil) or simply Nolto, is a South Korean variety show that airs every Saturday at 19:40 (KST) on tvN.

== Program ==
In each episode, a market from South Korea is featured and within it there are three types of food/drink selected as its representatives. The cast and guest(s) have to play games and win to be able to enjoy the food. There will be a dressing theme concept for the cast and guest(s) to follow for filming of each episode. From episode 431, there would not be a featured market, and a chef would appear in each episode to cook the 3-course meal personally.

For episodes 1-4, the program format is only three rounds of song dictation. From episode 5-381, the program format changed to two rounds of song dictation, with a Snack Time game in between the dictation segments. From episode 382, the program format changed into a "course meal" format: an Appetizer game (a Snack Time game played in two teams), one round of song dictation and a Snack Time game.

=== Games played ===
Song Dictation: Viewers can recommend songs (and the specific parts of the songs) through a Google Form for use in the show. The cast and guest(s) have to work together to note down all the correct lyrics that was being sung in a small part of the song chosen to play. For each song, they will be given only three attempts to get all the correct lyrics. For every failed attempt, the food will be consumed by Mukbang YouTuber Small-mouthed Haetnim.

- On failing the first attempt, the amount of the food to be shared by the cast and guest(s) would be cut by half.
- On failing the second attempt, the amount of the food to be shared would be cut to only 1–2 servings.
- If they have completely failed, no food would be given.

For each attempt, a representative from the cast and guest(s) would go up and present their final answer, and if the answer is wrong, the representative gets the popcorn punishment.

On the first attempt, only the basic chances are provided, and the chances from the Chance Board can only be used on the second and third attempts. After using a chance from the Chance Board, the part of the song is played again. The same chance cannot be used twice in the same round. Starting episode 201, for every episode, the chances from the Chance Board that were used in Song 1 cannot be used in Song 2.

- Basic Chances (given on the first attempt):
  - One Shot (for the cast member(s)/guest(s) who jotted down the closest answer to the correct answer on the first listen)
  - Number of words
  - Song information
  - Lyrics before and after the part used (Note: However, in some songs, either of the two or both would not be provided due to being possibly critical hints to the correct answer. It can also be due to the part being the first or last lines of the song.)
  - Existence and number of words in English (and/or words from other non-Korean languages)
  - Existence and number of numbers
  - Others (slangs/neologisms/dialects/commonly used Korean language words that are not spelled in standard)
- Other Chances:
  - Listen Again Chance: The part of the song is repeated again. This chance can only be used once for every episode, either in Song 1 or Song 2. Beginning episode 148, this chance can be carried forward to the next episode if unused, leading to more times this chance can be used.
  - Last Place's Listen Again Chance: Similar to the Listen Again Chance, in which it can only be used once for every episode, but this chance is only for the last place in one shot on the first attempt of the song dictation. If there are two or more people who are in last place and one of them is a guest, then the guest will get the chance. If the last place is shared by the cast members, the person who has the less cumulative number of one shots will get the chance. This chance was added in episode 201.
- Chance Board (for only the second and third attempts):
  - All Spaces: All the spaces for the lyrics will be shown.
  - One Word: A word of the lyrics (that is requested) will be shown.
  - Two Consonants: The initial consonants of two words of the lyrics (that are requested) will be shown. This chance was introduced in episode 54.
  - Number of Wrong Words: The number of wrong words will be shown. This chance was introduced in episode 6. This chance was modified for only episodes 244–245, where the number of correct words would be provided instead.
  - Slow (70%) Hearing: The song will be played at 70% of the normal playback speed. This chance was introduced in the second round in episode 46, where it temporarily replaced All Spaces. It became a fixed chance starting episode 54.
  - Two Final Consonants: The final consonants of two words of the lyrics (that are requested) will be shown. This chance was introduced in episode 386.
- Other/Discontinued Chances:
  - Boom Car Service: This is a descriptive chance, where Boom makes the smooth sound of the car on the parts that are correctly answered, and then makes the sound of the car crashed on the wrong part of the lyrics answered. This chance can only be used on the third attempt.
  - Acting Chance: Boom acts to describe the lyrics of the song.
  - Live Chance: The live version of the song used is played.
  - Two Vowels: Vowels of two words of the lyrics (that are requested) will be shown. This chance was discontinued after episode 88.
  - 1/5 Seconds: All the words of the lyrics are quickly shown for only 0.2 seconds. This chance was introduced in episode 89. As there is a high success rate after using this chance, starting from episode 95, after using this chance, there is no listening to the part of the song again. This chance was discontinued after episode 134, but had briefly returned for the second round in episode 192.
  - Fool Fool Boom Fool: Only one question, of any content about the lyrics, can be asked to Boom, and he can only answer yes or no. This chance was introduced in episode 89. This chance was then added into the Chance Board beginning episode 201, not becoming the basic chance provided in the first attempt. This chance was discontinued after episode 236. The chance briefly returned in episodes 325 and 359, where a question related to the identity of the mafia can also be asked.
  - Guest Hero Ball: This chance is specially for the guests of each episode, and all guests of each episode would each be entitled to one hero ball pick, either in the first song or the second song. He/she would randomly pick a ball that contains one word of the lyrics, and he/she must not let the cast and other guest(s) know this word. This is to let the guests have an advantage over the cast members, who have more experience in song dictation. This chance was introduced in episode 282, and was then discontinued after episode 312.
  - Spin and Go Play: One guest gets spun on the chair five times and do the elephant spin five times, then moves to press the character number on the display that wants to be seen. The character that is on this number would be revealed. This would be done with two guests, leading to two characters revealed.
  - Random Hint: In every episode, this hint provided by Boom would be randomised. This chance was introduced in episode 237, replacing Fool Fool Boom Fool, and was discontinued after episode 385.
    - Boom-casso: Boom would draw out one line of the lyrics (that is requested) in 20 seconds.
    - Rose of Boom Has Bloomed: In the rhythm of Red Light, Green Light, Boom reveals one line of the lyrics (that is requested) in three poses.
    - View View Boom View: Boom would mouth out five consecutive words of the lyrics (that are requested), and the cast members and guests would use their magnifying glasses to look at Boom's mouth shape.
    - No~ Boom Teeth: Boom would read out five consecutive words of the lyrics (that are requested) in a way that his teeth cannot be seen when saying out.
    - Shake It Boom Fool: This chance is similar to Fool Fool Boom Fool, but the difference being if Boom answers "yes" to the first question, a second question can be asked, and if Boom answers "no" to the first question, there would not be a second question asked.
    - Shake The Boom Butt: Boom would write out two consecutive words of the lyrics (that are requested) with his butt.
    - Boom Come And Go: Boom would move the pointer to and fro on the hand-drawn Chance Board with the other five chances and Fool Fool Boom Fool, and when he hears "Stop", the chance at which Boom's pointer stops at would be provided. This chance is a mandatory chance in the first attempt of the dictation on episodes 244 and 245.
    - Troublemaker Boom: Boom would reveal the final consonants of two words of the lyrics (that are requested).
    - Matured Boom: Boom would show two words of the lyrics (that are requested) through the Iron Delivery Case game. A modified version of this hint, titled Matured Part-timer, appeared on episode 268, where instead of Boom holding the iron delivery case, a guest would hold it instead.
    - Boom Power Station: Boom would write four consecutive words of the lyrics (that are requested) on a pinwheel, then turn it in front of the cast members and guests, for them to attempt to see while the music is played. An upgraded version of this hint appeared on episode 281, named Boom Windmill Village, where Boom would write only two words of the lyrics (that are requested) on a larger toy windmill.
    - Hello It's Boom: Boom would reveal four consecutive words of the lyrics (that are requested) to one of the guests through a paper cup phone.
    - Electric Boom Eel: Boom would reveal three consecutive words of the lyrics (that are requested) through a voice-modulated microphone.
    - Para Para Boom: Boom would place two consecutive words of the lyrics (that are requested) in his jacket and then flap it in front of the cast members and guests, for them to attempt to see while Jo Sung-mo's "I Swear" is played.
    - Party Party Boom: Boom would write two words of the lyrics (that are requested) on a party horn, and he would blow it in front of the cast members and guests, for them to attempt to see.
    - Kings-Boom: Boom would place two consecutive words of the lyrics (that are requested) on an umbrella and then continuously open and close it in front of the cast members and guests, for them to attempt to see.
    - Boom Fan Guru: Boom would write two words of the lyrics (that are requested) on a Hand fan, and then open and close it continuously in front of the cast members and guests, for them to attempt to see while the music is played.
    - Boom-san Mask Dance: Boom would write two words of the lyrics (that are requested) on the sleeves of the clothes, and then do the Mask Dance in front of the cast members and guests, for them to attempt to see.
    - Sorry Sorry Boom: Boom would write two words of the lyrics (that are requested) on two palm-shaped toys and then flap them in front of the cast members and guests, for them to attempt to see while Super Junior's Sorry Sorry is played. A modified version of this hint appeared on episode 277, where the song used would be Tae Jin-ah's I'm So Sorry instead. For episode 287, the original version of this chance would be renamed Clap Clap Boom.
    - Han Seok-Boom: Boom would write two words of the lyrics (that are requested) on the backs of two people with a brush.
    - Arirang Boom Boom: Boom would write two words of the lyrics (that are requested) on two flags, and then wave them in front of the cast members and guests, for them to attempt to see while Koyote's Arirang Mokdong is played.
    - Lo-Boom Letter: Boom would write two words of the lyrics (that are requested) on an acrylic board, and blow air on it in front of the cast members and guests, for them to attempt to see.
    - Techno Boom: Boom would write two words of the lyrics (that are requested) on two CDs, then hold them and dance the Tecktonik Dance in front of the cast members and guests, for them to attempt to see.
    - Boom Dog Sheep Cow Horse: Boom would write three numbers representing the positions of the words of the lyrics (that are requested) on three yut sticks, and one representative would throw these yut sticks and one normal yut stick. Depending on the number(s) that appear, the respective words would be provided. If the outcome is "horse", the representative can throw one more time.
    - Red Boom Dragonfly: Boom would write two words of the lyrics (that are requested) on the wing clothes, and flap them in front of the cast members and guests, for them to attempt to see.
    - Why Does Boom Fool Run Away: Boom would write two numbers representing the positions of the words of the lyrics (that are requested) on two stickers and paste them on his clothes. Subsequently, while Lim Young-woong's Love Always Run Away is played, Lim Young-woong would chase Boom and once caught, these stickers would be removed from the latter and these words would then be revealed.
    - Boom Cat: Boom would write two words of the lyrics (that are requested) on a paper that is attached to a cat fishing rod toy, and then play it in front of the cast members and guests, for them to attempt to see.
    - Bang Bang Boom: Boom would write two words of the lyrics (that are requested) on the papers placed in two specially made guns, and then shoot them out in front of the cast members and guests, for them to attempt to see.
    - Boom is Incredible: Boom would write two words of the lyrics (that are requested) on the papers that are attached to the ears of a dog hat, and then play it in front of the cast members and guests, for them to attempt to see.
    - Courteous Boom of the East: Boom would write two words of the lyrics (that are requested) on the papers that are attached to a royal inspector hat, and then play it in front of the cast members and guests, for them to attempt to see.
    - Boom-dolph: Boom would write two words of the lyrics (that are requested) on the papers that are attached to the ears of a Rudolph hat, and then play it in front of the cast members and guests, for them to attempt to see.
    - Observer Boom: Boom would write two words of the lyrics (that are requested) on the papers that are attached to a small steering wheel, then hold it and dance to g.o.d's Observation in front of the cast members and guests, for them to attempt to see.
    - Cleaning Freak Boom: Boom would write two words of the lyrics (that are requested) on a paper that is attached to a duster, and then swing it in front of the cast members and guests, for them to attempt to see.
    - Killer Boom: Boom would write two words of the lyrics (that are requested) on a paper that is attached to the inside of a toy sword, and then open and closes its sheath repeatedly in front of the cast members and guests, for them to attempt to see.
    - Myungrang Boom-dog: Boom would write two words of the lyrics (that are requested) on a paper attached to a hotdog skewer, and then twist it in front of the cast members and guests, for them to attempt to see.
    - Flying Boom: Boom would write two words of the lyrics (that are requested) on a kite, and then fly it in front of the cast members and guests, for them to attempt to see.
    - Marry My Boom Husband: Boom would write two words of the lyrics (that are requested) on a piece of paper that is placed in a ring box, and then open and close the ring box in front of the cast members and guests, for them to attempt to see.
    - The Bluebeard Boom: Boom would write two words of the lyrics (that are requested) on two tambourines, and then shake them to Le Sserafim's Eve, Psyche & the Bluebeard's Wife in front of the cast members and guests, for them to attempt to see.
    - Bullfight Boom: Boom would write two words of the lyrics (that are requested) on a red cloth, and then shake it in front of the cast members and guests, for them to attempt to see.
    - Katsu Katsu Boom-katsu: Boom would write two words of the lyrics (that are requested) on two hammers, and then hit them in front of the cast members and guests, for them to attempt to see.
    - The Queen's Boom Knight: Boom would write two words of the lyrics (that are requested) on a toy sword, and then do the sword dance in front of the cast members and guests, for them to attempt to see.
    - Talk Boom: Boom would write two words of the lyrics (that are requested) on the paws of a horse suit that he would wear, and then run around in front of the cast members and guests, for them to attempt to see.
    - Female High School Student Boom: Boom would write two words of the lyrics (that are requested) on a blackboard eraser, and flip it around in front of the cast members and guests, for them to attempt to see.
    - Beep Beep Boom: Boom would write two words of the lyrics (that are requested) on the paws of a unicorn suit that he would wear, and then run around in front of the cast members and guests to BtoB's Beep Beep, for them to attempt to see.
    - Boom-tist: Boom would write two words of the lyrics (that are requested) on an accordion, and play it in front of the cast members and guests, for them to attempt to see.
    - Boom-spa: Boom would write two words of the lyrics (that are requested) on a scrubbing stick, and shake it in front of the cast members and guests, for them to attempt to see.
    - Graduate Boom: Boom would write two words of the lyrics (that are requested) on an academic certificate, and open and close it in front of the cast members and guests, for them to attempt to see.
    - Boom-derella: Boom would write two words of the lyrics (that are requested) on the soles of a pair of glass shoes, and show them in front of the cast members and guests, for them to attempt to see.
    - Water-Boom: Boom would write two words of the lyrics (that are requested) on two papers attached to a water gun, and play it in front of the cast members and guests, for them to attempt to see.
    - La Boom Ba: Boom would write two words of the lyrics (that are requested) on papers attached to two maracas, and shake them in front of the cast members and guests, for them to attempt to see.
    - How Many Rice Grains Boom?: Boom would write three words of the lyrics (that are requested) on three white balls that would be placed in a container, and then shake the container in front of the cast members and guests, for them to attempt to see.
    - Blow Boom Fan: Boom would write two words of the lyrics (that are requested) on papers attached to two mini electric fans, and show them in front of the cast members and guests, for them to attempt to see. An upgraded version of this hint appeared on episode 329, named King Boom Fan in the Woods, where Boom would write on a large electric fan instead.
    - Hey Boom: Boom would write two words of the lyrics (that are requested) on papers attached to a vintage microphone, and play with it in front of the cast members and guests, for them to attempt to see.
    - Thunderous Boom: Boom would write two words of the lyrics (that are requested) on two sides of a small drum, and play with it in front of the cast members and guests, for them to attempt to see.
    - Boom Fast & Furious: Boom would write two words of the lyrics (that are requested) on papers attached to a toy steering wheel, and play with it in front of the cast members and guests, for them to attempt to see.
    - Today is also Boom: Boom would write two words of the lyrics (that are requested) on gloves, and wear them and move around in front of the cast members and guests, for them to attempt to see.
    - Gym Boy Boom: Boom would write two words of the lyrics (that are requested) on a dumbbell, and move it in front of the cast members and guests, for them to attempt to see.
    - Oh My God Boom: Boom would write two words of the lyrics (that are requested) on a gat, and move it in front of the cast members and guests, for them to attempt to see.
    - Seoul Boom-er: Boom would write two words of the lyrics (that are requested) on a bulletproof vest, and move around with it in front of the cast members and guests, for them to attempt to see.
    - Ready Boom Action: Boom would write two words of the lyrics (that are requested) on a slate, and move around with it in front of the cast members and guests, for them to attempt to see.
    - Bad Boom Good Boom: Boom would write two words of the lyrics (that are requested) on a palm model, and move around with it in front of the cast members and guests, for them to attempt to see.
    - Usher's Friend Boom: TBA
    - Swing Boom: Boom would write two words of the lyrics (that are requested) on gloves, and move around with them on in front of the cast members and guests, for them to attempt to see.
    - Half-Half Boom With Many: Boom would write two words of the lyrics (that are requested) on a huge chicken drumstick pillow, and move around with it in front of the cast members and guests, for them to attempt to see.
    - Don't Leave Boom: Boom would write two words of the lyrics (that are requested) on a transparent balloon, and move around with it in front of the cast members and guests, for them to attempt to see.
    - Boom Plop: Boom would write two words of the lyrics (that are requested) on a mini Janggu, and move around with it in front of the cast members and guests, for them to attempt to see.
    - Body One Top Boom: Boom would write two words of the lyrics (that are requested) on an abs model, and move around with it in front of the cast members and guests, for them to attempt to see.
    - Judge Boom: Boom would write two words of the lyrics (that are requested) on two sides of a toy gavel, and play with it in front of the cast members and guests, for them to attempt to see.
    - Cheer Up Boom: Boom would write two words of the lyrics (that are requested) on papers attached to two pom-poms, and play with them in front of the cast members and guests, for them to attempt to see.
    - Fireman Boom: Boom would write two words of the lyrics (that are requested) on a piece of paper attached to a toy fire extinguisher, and play with it in front of the cast members and guests, for them to attempt to see.
    - Silver Boom: Boom would write two words of the lyrics (that are requested) on papers attached to the bottom of a handbell, and play with it in front of the cast members and guests, for them to attempt to see.
    - Come Out Boom: Boom would write two words of the lyrics (that are requested) on two sides of a toy hammer, and play with it in front of the cast members and guests, for them to attempt to see.
    - Bloody Boom: Boom would write two words of the lyrics (that are requested) on a cape, and play with it in front of the cast members and guests, for them to attempt to see.
    - Boom Running Through Time: Boom would write two words of the lyrics (that are requested) on a mini clock, and move around it in front of the cast members and guests, for them to attempt to see.
    - Boom Untold: Boom would write two words of the lyrics (that are requested) on musical notes lines, and move them around in front of the cast members and guests, for them to attempt to see.
    - Musical Boom: Boom would write two words of the lyrics (that are requested) on musical notes balloons, and move them around in front of the cast members and guests, for them to attempt to see.
    - Daddy Boom: Boom would write two words of the lyrics (that are requested) on a mobile, and move it around in front of the cast members and guests, for them to attempt to see.
    - Hot Potato Boom: Boom would write two words of the lyrics (that are requested) on a model Tornado potato, and move it around in front of the cast members and guests, for them to attempt to see.
    - Reporter Boom: Boom would write two words of the lyrics (that are requested) on a megaphone, and move it around in front of the cast members and guests, for them to attempt to see.
    - Doctor Boom: Boom would write two words of the lyrics (that are requested) on a skeleton balloon, and move it around in front of the cast members and guests, for them to attempt to see.
    - Bull-headed Boom: Boom would write two words of the lyrics (that are requested) on a Muleta, and move it around in front of the cast members and guests, for them to attempt to see.
    - DJ Boom: Boom would write two words of the lyrics (that are requested) on a LP record, and move it around in front of the cast members and guests, for them to attempt to see.
    - Red Devils Boom: Boom would write two words of the lyrics (that are requested) on two cheering bars, and move them around in front of the cast members and guests, for them to attempt to see.
    - Gym Boy Boom: Boom would write two words of the lyrics (that are requested) on two dumbbells, and move them around in front of the cast members and guests, for them to attempt to see.
    - Boom-stival: Boom would write two words of the lyrics (that are requested) on a slogan fabric, and move them around in front of the cast members and guests, for them to attempt to see.
    - Shake It Shake It Boom: Boom would write two words of the lyrics (that are requested) on two cocktail shakers, and move them around in front of the cast members and guests, for them to attempt to see.
    - Baby Boom: Boom would write two words of the lyrics (that are requested) on a baby mobile, and move them around in front of the cast members and guests, for them to attempt to see.
    - TaeBo Boom is Coming: Boom would write two words of the lyrics (that are requested) on a pair of boxing gloves, and move them around in front of the cast members and guests, for them to attempt to see.
    - Prey Boom: Boom would write two words of the lyrics (that are requested) on a pair of bear paws, and move them around in front of the cast members and guests, for them to attempt to see.
    - Fairy Boom: Boom would write two words of the lyrics (that are requested) on a fan, and move it around in front of the cast members and guests, for them to attempt to see.
    - Iron Taste Boom: Boom would write two words of the lyrics (that are requested) on dumbbell models, and move them around in front of the cast members and guests, for them to attempt to see.

A second version of song dictation was introduced in episode 224, where it was played as a team match between two teams. Additional rules were put in place for only this version.

- The first team to get all the correct lyrics in three attempts wins the food. It would be a tie if both teams get all the correct lyrics in the same attempt.
- After the failing of the first and second attempts, in the case of the two teams wanting to use different chances, there would be a mini game played between the two teams, and the winning team can decide which chance to use for all.

A third version of song dictation was introduced in episode 244, where it was played as a team relay with three teams. Additional rules were put in place for only this version.

- For episode 244, the top 3 in cumulative number of one shots (bottom 3 for episode 245) would be the leaders of their own teams and would each choose their team members. For episode 258, the Ive members were split into 3 teams and each would choose the cast members.
- There are three lines to dictate, with each team taking one line. Each team has six attempts (five for episode 258) to note down the correct lyrics of their own line, with the team(s) with the fewest attempts getting to eat the food first, and only the last team would not get to eat the food. After the first team's success, if the remaining two teams succeeded on the same attempt, the food would be provided to both teams.
- As there would be six attempts provided, there would be no Listen Again Chance and Last Place Listen Again Chance, but each team can choose a chance of their choice on the Chance Board on every attempt beginning the second attempt, as Random Hint was already provided in the first attempt for episodes 244–245. There is no Random Hint for episode 258.

A fourth version of song dictation was introduced in episode 300, where it was played as mafia song dictation. Additional rules were put in place for only this version.

- Through a lottery, from the playing cast members there are 2 mafias (3 for episode 359), and the rest are citizens.
- The mafias will start the dictation knowing all the correct lyrics beforehand.
- There are a total of five attempts (four for episodes 317, 325 and 375, three for episode 359), and after each failed attempt, voting of the mafia would be done. The arrested member cannot participate in subsequent attempt(s) of the song dictation. If a mafia has a One Shot but is arrested, that One Shot would not be added to the One Shot statistics.
- The mafia team can delete a chance out of the available chances on the Chance Board after failing an attempt to arrest the mafia. (Note: In episode 300, there are a total of eight chances, which includes all the present Chances of the Chance Board (with All Spaces chance split into First Line All Spaces and Second Line All Spaces), plus Fool Fool Boom Fool. In subsequent mafia song dictations, only the chances from the Chance Board are available.)
- If the cast succeeds in the song dictation or if all mafias are arrested before all the song dictation attempts, the citizen team wins. The mafia team wins if the song dictation is failed.

A fifth version of song dictation was introduced in episode 309, where it was played as speed song dictation. Additional rules were put in place for only this version.

- The cast members and guests are split into 4 teams of 4, and there are 6 rounds of song dictation. Each song has 4 lines, with the single words shown as markers of the start of the answering lines for each team member.
- After the leader gets the chance by pressing the button, the team answers all the lines in order.
- All 4 teams can choose to attempt or pass. If one team answers wrongly, they cannot answer again until the other teams have either attempted or passed.
- Boom would then reveal the number of words in each line after all teams had their first attempts, and the 4 teams listen to the part one more time. Afterwards, all 4 teams can choose to attempt or pass again, then they listen to the part one more time.
- Boom can give one word of the lyrics to the team that wins a mini game.
- The team that answers all 4 lines of the song correctly first wins a point(s). (Note: 1 point for round 1–3, 2 points for round 4–5, and 6 points for round 6.)

A sixth version of song dictation was introduced in episode 411, where it was played as relay song dictation. Additional rules were put in place for only this version.

- The cast members are split into 2 teams. For episode 411, the 1st and 2nd person to escape in "Dictation Escape Room" segment would be the leaders of their own teams and would each choose their team members.
- The part of the song lyrics to be dictated is divided into three lines. Three people from each team must note down one line each in a relay, with 3 seconds allotted per person.
- One person from each team wears headphones so they cannot hear the song that is being played. This person must correctly guess the singer and the title of the song by looking at the lyrics written earlier by their team.
- The team that guesses correctly earns a point, and the team that reach 4 points first wins and gets to eat.

A seventh version of song dictation was introduced in episode 429, where it was played as speed team song dictation. Additional rules were put in place for only this version.

- The cast members and guests are split into 2 teams by drawing lots.
- The part of the song lyrics to be dictated is played, and each team must note down all the correct lyrics.
- The team that manages to answer the lyrics correctly earns a point, and the team that reaches 3 points first wins and gets to eat. From episode 433, this requirement was changed to 2 points.
- In the case of a tie between both teams at the end, both teams win.

Snack Time: Different from the Song Dictation segment, this is an individual battle where only the last placing cast member/guest would not get the snack.

- New/Old Neologism Quiz: Answer the full phrase of the Korean neologism that is given as question.
  - A similar version of the game, titled MZ Phrase Quiz, was featured on episode 309, where the full phrase of the abbreviated term that many MZ used has to be answered.
- North Korean Cultural Quiz: Answer the word/sentence, which is said in North Korean dialect, in South Korean dialect.
- New/Old OST Quiz: Answer the correct name of the drama/movie/animation based on its original soundtrack.
- What is This Food?/Big Appearance Quiz: Answer the correct food based on its close-up.
- Voice Support Quiz: Answer the correct line(s) based on a capture of a drama/movie/advertisement/variety show/comedy.
- Your Eyes, Nose, Lips Quiz: Answer the correct celebrity based on separate pictures of his/her eyes, nose and lips.
- Consonants Quiz: Answer the correct term based on its initial consonants. Normally, there is a specific common theme for the questions.
  - For the Songs version, the correct song name and its singer has to be answered.
- Love Love Couple Quiz: Answer the other half of the couple based on one half of the couple from a drama/movie/animation/webtoon being shown.
- Find The Fan Club Owner: Answer the correct celebrity based on the fan club name given as question.
- New/Old Game BGM Quiz: Answer the correct game name based on its background music or sound effects. The game can be of an online game or a mobile phone game.
- Translator Quiz: Answer the correct term/sentence that was originally being said through an online translator, which has a foreign accent.
- Dictionary Battle: Answer the correct term based on its definition from the Standard Korean Language Dictionary.
- Lyrics Reading Quiz: Answer the correct singer/group and the song title from listening to the lyrics being read out in a consistent tone.
- Doppelganger Quiz: Answer the two (or three) correct drama/movie titles based on the captures of the same actor/actress in the dramas/movies. There is also a Singers version and a Variety version of this game.
- Dialect Tour: Answer the correct song title and its singer based on one of the Eight Provinces of Korea dialect translations for the song title given as question.
- I Can See Your Title: Answer the correct drama/movie/animation/webtoon/webnovel title based on its promotional poster.
  - An upgraded version of the game was featured on episode 266, where for each question's promotional poster, Boom's face was edited in, instead of having the face(s) of the original protagonist(s) shown.
- Find The Original Singer: Answer the song name and the original singer from listening to a cover or remake version of the song.
- Face/Off: Answer the correct celebrity based on a picture of him/her which has the gender of the celebrity swapped.
- Find The Hidden Real Name: Answer the correct celebrity based on his/her real name given as question.
- Noraebang Accompaniment Quiz: Answer the correct song title and its singer based on the Noraebang accompaniment of the song.
  - An upgraded version of the game was featured on episode 267, where Boom would add various sound effects for hindrance.
- Character Expression Quiz: Answer the correct celebrity based on the title or nickname used to express him/her.
- Choreography Décalcomanie Quiz: Answer the two (or three) correct singers/groups and the two (or three) songs based on the photos of a similar choreography or movement.
- Relation Between The Two?: Answer the correct relation between two people in a drama/movie/animation.
- What's Your Name?: Answer the correct name of the person/thing based on a picture of it.
  - There is also a Choreography version of the game, where the correct name of the dance and the correct song name would have to be answered instead.
  - There is also a Manhwa and Animation Characters version of the game, where the correct name of the character and the correct name of the animation/manhwa that the character is from would have to be answered instead.
- Lyrics Feeling Drama Quiz: Answer the correct song title and its singer from listening to its lyrics being read out like drama lines. This is also known as the opposite of the Lyrics Reading Quiz.
- Guess Them Right! Homes: Answer the correct drama/movie/animation/variety show based on a picture of the house or the interior of the house.
- Gag Corner Title Quiz: Answer the correct name of the corner of a gag program based on a scene of it.
- Who Are Today's 1st Place Nominees?: Answer the correct song names (either two or three of them) from left to right based on a capture of the 1st place nominees announcement of a music show from the past or from the present.
- Guess The Debut Song: Answer the singer/group's name along with the correct name of his/her/their debut song based on the picture of the singer/group.
- Find The Source of This Meme: Answer the correct name of the source (drama/reality show/variety show) based on the meme shown as question.
- Guess The First Winning Song: Answer the singer/group's name along with the correct name of the song that has given the said singer/group his/her/their first music show win based on the picture of the singer/group.
- Who Is Today's Ending Fairy?: Answer the singer/group's name along with the correct name of the song based on the picture of the singer/group/group member's ending shot of his/her/their stage performance in a music show.
- Singing Scene Quiz: Answer the correct song title and its singer based on a still cut (from a drama/movie) of someone singing.
- Music Show MC Ment Quiz: Answer the singer/group's name along with the correct name(s) of the song(s) based on the music show MC's introduction of the song(s) before the performance in a music show.
- Music Video Scene Quiz: Answer the correct song title and its singer based on a capture of the song's music video.
- Sing It Line by Line: For each round, a keyword is given, and the team with all their members singing a line of a song with the keyword and naming the song that was sung wins the round. The team with two rounds won out of three wins the snack. This is the show's first snack game played in teams, instead of playing individually.
- Lyrics in the Square Quiz: Answer the correct lyrics in the empty square based on the lyrics showed on the screen.
  - There is an alternate version of the game named Dialogue in the Square Quiz, where the correct dialogue of a drama/movie would have to be answered instead.
- Sub Title Quiz: Answer the correct song title (in Korean) and its singer based on its English title or other title.
- Director Quiz: Answer the question that was created by Park Sung-jae, the director of the tvN Variety Section.
- Guess The Alter Ego: Answer the correct name of the alter ego based on a picture of him/her.
- Half-Half Lyrics Quiz: Answer the two correct song titles based on their lyrics that have been combined.
- Guess The Debut Act: Answer the correct debut drama/movie title based on a picture of the actor/actress.
- Interlude Jump Quiz: Answer the correct song title and its singer from listening to its interlude.
- If It's the End Quiz: Answer the correct singer/group and the song title from listening to the ending of the song.
- Abbreviation Quiz: Answer the correct full phrase based on the abbreviation of it.
  - For the Songs version, answer the correct song title and its singer based on the abbreviation of the song title.
- Continue to Sing Quiz: Sing the correct lyrics of a song continuously through the standing mics provided. If a player of one team sings the wrong lyrics to that song, the chance will go to the other team. This snack game is played in teams.
- Facial Recognition Quiz: Answer the correct names of the actors and/or actresses/singers from left to right (and/or top to bottom) based on a picture of all their faces together.
- Alien Language Reading Quiz: Answer the correct singer/group and the song title from listening to the lyrics, which have all of the words' final consonants being either replaced or added with 'ㅇ' (ieung), being read out in a consistent tone.
- Omniscient Dialogue View: Answer the correct drama/movie title from listening to a snippet of its famous dialogue.
  - There is an alternate version of the game named Omniscient Ment View, where the correct name of the variety/cultural program would have to be answered instead.
- Who Are Your Parents?: Answer the two correct celebrities (comedians and the cast members and guests of the episode this game was played) from the "father" to the "mother" based on two face portraits of a son and a daughter where the two celebrities' faces are fused together.
- Why Are You Coming Out From There?: Answer the correct drama/movie title based on a capture of a celebrity who made a special appearance in the said drama/movie.
- How Much Do You Like Mukbang: Answer the correct drama/movie title based on a still cut (from the said drama/movie) of someone eating.
- A Ghost Appeared!: Answer the correct drama/movie title based on a still cut of a ghost that appeared from the said drama/movie.
- Fashion King on Stage: Answer the correct singer/group and the song title based on his/her/their stage outfit(s) of the said song.
- Mom's Friend's Son & Mom's Friend's Daughter: Answer the correct drama title based on pictures of the father/mother and the son/daughter that appeared in the said drama.
- Today's Workout Scene Quiz: Answer the correct drama/movie title based on a still cut (from the said drama/movie) of someone doing workout or sport.
  - There is also a music video version of the game, where the correct singer/group of the song and the correct song name would have to be answered instead.
- Guess It Right Crime Scene: Answer the correct drama/movie title based on a still cut (from the said drama/movie) of a crime scene.
- You're A Big Villain: Answer the correct drama/movie title based on a still cut of the villain from the said drama/movie.
- Lightstick? Guess It Stick!: Answer the correct name of the K-pop lightstick based on a picture of it.
- Oh~ Yeah~ Na~ (Woo~) (La~) (Baby~) (Come On!) Quiz: Answer the correct singer/group and the song title from listening to the part of the song where the word 'Oh', 'Yeah', 'Na', 'Woo', 'La', 'Baby', or 'Come On' was sung.
- Hey A.I. Draw A Picture~: Answer the correct singer/group and the song title based on a picture generated from Artificial Intelligence after inputting a part of the song's lyrics to it.
- The Star's Childhood: Answer the correct celebrity based on a childhood picture of him/her shown.
- Guess It Guess It! Friends: Answer the correct drama/movie title based on pictures of the two actors/actresses/an actor and an actress that co-starred in the said drama/movie.
- Song Narration Quiz: Answer the correct singer/group and the song title from listening to the narration part of the song.
- Guess It Right Love Scene: Answer the correct drama/movie title based on a still cut (from the said drama/movie) of a love scene.

Appetizer Game: Introduced in episode 382 with the change in program format, an appetizer game is played in the first part of each episode. It is played in two teams, with only the winning team getting to eat the appetizer. The game can be of a Snack Time game modified to be played in teams, or a completely new game introduced. Listed are new games that were introduced as only appetizer games:

- English Speed Quiz: Each team sends out one member to express in English, and the remaining team members attempt to answer. For each round, the team with more questions answered wins.
- United as One: This would be a Snack Time game modified to be played in two teams. To answer, one team would have to say one syllable per team member in sequence, and if one team member answers wrongly, the chance goes to the other team. The team gets one point if all its members have said out their respective syllables correctly and in sequence.
- Charades: Each team sends out one member to express using his/her body, and the remaining team members attempt to answer. For each round, the team with more questions answered wins.
- Pictionary: Each team sends out one member to express by drawing a picture, and the remaining team members attempt to answer. For each round, the team with more questions answered wins.
- Tell Me Line by Line Tell Me: For the drama/movie version, in each round a picture of an actor/actress would be shown, and the team wins the round if the team manages to name the dramas/movies he/she has acted in without any wrong answers or repeats.
- I'm a Person Like This! Quiz: A guest expresses something related to him/her through drawing, and the remaining cast members and guest(s) attempt to answer the keyword. For each guest, only the cast member(s)/guest(s) with the most number of correct answers can have the appetizer. This appetizer game is played individually.

== Cast ==
=== Current ===
Name	Episode	Episode(s) absent
Boom (Main host, non-playing cast)	1-present	139-140, 171-172
Shin Dong-yup	1-present	205-206
Kim Dong-hyun	1-present	95, 97, 172, 354-355
Moon Se-yoon	1-present	—N/a
Hanhae	1-47, 134-present	—N/a
Nucksal	52‍–‍present	72, 285
P.O (Block B)	52-208, 289-present	54, 60-61, 77, 93-94, 165-166, 198, 309 (Note: Absent only in the Snack Time segment.)-310, 331 (Note: Absent only in the 2nd round of Song Dictation.), 429-430
Taeyeon (Girls' Generation)	135-present	241-242, 268-269, 278-279, 358-359, 366, 370
Young K (Day6)	407-present	410-412 (Note: Absent only in the Snack Time segment for episode 411.), 415-416, 420

=== Former ===
Name	Episode	Episode(s) absent
Hyeri (Girl's Day)	1-134	36
Park Na-rae	1-397	17, 201, 227-228, 270-271, 280-281, 286-287
Key (Shinee)	1-51, 134-399	13, 42, 151, 184, 237-238, 241-242, 254, 272-273, 286-287, 330, 337, 398-399
Haetnim (Note: Mukbang YouTuber) (Non-playing cast)	1-399	—N/a

=== Changes to the cast ===
Nucksal and P.O joined the show starting from episode 52 to replace Hanhae and Key, who were confirmed to enlist in the army on February 7 and March 4, 2019, respectively. Hanhae and Key officially left after episode 47 and episode 51 respectively, following military enlistments.

On October 20, 2020, tvN confirmed that Hyeri will be leaving the show, with her last episode expected to be in late November. In addition, Hanhae and Key were confirmed to return to the show, and Taeyeon will also join the show. Hyeri officially left after episode 134, while Hanhae and Key returned as fixed cast members in the same episode. Taeyeon joined the show from episode 135.

On February 10, 2022, it was confirmed that P.O will enlist in the Republic of Korea Marine Corps on March 28. P.O left the show after episode 208, following his military enlistment. On October 11, 2023, tvN confirm that P.O would return to the show beginning episode 289.

On December 8, 2025, it was confirmed that Park Na-rae will be leaving the show due to personal controversies leading to her hiatus, and she would be edited out as much as possible for episodes 396 and 397.

On December 17, 2025 it was confirmed that Key will also be leaving the show due to a personal controversy leading to his hiatus.

On December 19, 2025 it was confirmed that non-playing cast Haetnim will also be leaving the show due to a personal controversy leading to her hiatus.

On February 6, 2026 it was confirmed that Day6's Young K will be joining the show beginning episode 407.

=== Background music ===
Each member has their own background music played during different segments of the program. Before the introduction of the Market, the BGM is "Very Nice" by Seventeen. It is usually followed by the guest's songs when the food or snack is shown. During the usage of the Fool Fool Boom Fool chance, "Twit" by Hwasa is being played as its BGM.

Member	Background music
Shin Dong-yup	Lee Hyo-ri – "Bad Girls"; Aespa – "Next Level"; Aespa – "Savage"; Aespa – "Spicy"; Aespa – "Drama"; Aespa – "Supernova"; Aespa – "Whiplash"; Aespa – "Rich Man"
Kim Dong-hyun	Rain – "Hip Song"
Moon Se-yoon	Ha Hyun-woo – "Diamond"; Bookku Ddoong – "Shy Ddoong (feat. Ravi)"
Park Na-rae	Navi – "I Ain't Going Home Tonight" (feat. Geeks); Little Mix – "Bounce Back"
Hanhae	Hanhae – "Over Action"; Hanhae – "Champagne"
Key (SHINee)	SHINee – "Sherlock (Clue + Note)"; SHINee – "Lucifer"; Key – "Bad Love"; Key – "Gasoline"; Key – "Killer"; Key – "Good & Great"; Key – "Pleasure Shop"
Hyeri (Girl's Day)	Girl's Day – "Something"
Nucksal	Deepflow – "Cut Cut Cut" (feat. Nucksal, Huckleberry P)
P.O (Block B)	Bastarz – "Conduct Zero"; Block B – "Shall We Dance"
Taeyeon (Girls' Generation)	Taeyeon – "Spark"; Taeyeon – "Weekend"; Taeyeon – "INVU"; Girls' Generation – "Forever 1"; Taeyeon – "To. X"; Taeyeon – "Heaven"; Taeyeon – "Letter To Myself"; Taeyeon – "Panorama"

== One Shots ==
=== First Place One Shot ===
A First Place One Shot is given to the cast member/guest who has jotted down the closest answer to the correct answer on the first listen, only on the first attempt of the song dictations. This is usually calculated by the number of correct characters (in Hangul) written down in comparison to the correct answer. While the One Shot is usually given to one person, there were instances where a tie between two or more people have occurred; in this case, they will share the One Shot.

The cast member(s) or guest(s) who got a One Shot are as listed:

(Names in bold are the guests of the episodes.)

List of One Shots

Episode	Round 1 One Shot Recipient(s)	Round 2 One Shot Recipient(s)	Round 3 One Shot Recipient(s)
1	Key	Hyeri	Shin Dong-yup
2	Park Na-rae	Key	Hanhae
3	Hyeri	Hanhae	Hyeri
4	Hyeri	Key, Hyeri	Hanhae
5	Hanhae	Moon Se-yoon	—N/a (Note: Does not apply beginning episode 5.)
6	Park Na-rae	Moon Se-yoon	—N/a
7	—N/a	Key, Hyeri	—N/a
8	Key		—N/a
9	Hanhae	Moon Se-yoon	—N/a
10	Hanhae	Key	—N/a
11	Shin Dong-yup, Park Na-rae	Shin Dong-yup	—N/a
12	Key		—N/a
13	Hyeri	Kim Dong-hyun, Hanhae	—N/a
14	**Lee Dae-hwi**	Shin Dong-yup	—N/a
15	Hyeri		—N/a
16	Kim Dong-hyun, Moon Se-yoon	Key	—N/a
17	Key	Hanhae	—N/a
18	Key		—N/a
19	Key	Hyeri	—N/a
20	Hanhae	Park Na-rae	—N/a
21	**Jisoo**	Hyeri	—N/a
22	Hanhae	Key	—N/a
23	Moon Se-yoon	Park Na-rae, **Donghae**	—N/a
24	Moon Se-yoon	Kim Dong-hyun, Hanhae	—N/a
25	Hyeri	Moon Se-yoon	—N/a
26	Key	Hyeri	—N/a
27	Moon Se-yoon	**JB**	—N/a
28	**Yura**	Moon Se-yoon	—N/a
29	**Park Ji-sun**		—N/a
30	Moon Se-yoon	Key	—N/a
31	Key	Hanhae	—N/a
32	Key	Moon Se-yoon, Park Na-rae, Key	—N/a
33	Park Na-rae	Key	—N/a
34	Moon Se-yoon	Hanhae	—N/a
35	**Solji**	Key	—N/a
36	Park Na-rae	Key	—N/a
37	Key	Hanhae	—N/a
38	Park Na-rae	Hyeri	—N/a
39	Park Na-rae	Hanhae	—N/a
40	Key	Moon Se-yoon	—N/a
41	Kim Dong-hyun	**Luda**	—N/a
42	Hyeri		—N/a
43	Hanhae	Shin Dong-yup, Park Na-rae	—N/a
44	Park Na-rae	Key	—N/a
45	Moon Se-yoon	Key	—N/a
46	Park Na-rae	Key	—N/a
47	Park Na-rae	Hyeri	—N/a
48	Moon Se-yoon	Key	—N/a
49	Key	Park Na-rae	—N/a
50	Key	**Hwasa**	—N/a
51	Key		—N/a
52	**Woo Ji-yoon**		—N/a
53	**B-Bomb**	P.O	—N/a
54	**Lee Yong-jin**		—N/a
55	**Sejeong**	Moon Se-yoon	—N/a
56	Park Na-rae	Nucksal	—N/a
57	Nucksal		—N/a
58	Park Na-rae	Nucksal, **Minhyun**	—N/a
59	Nucksal	Nucksal, P.O	—N/a
60	**Park Ji-sun**		—N/a
61	Nucksal	Hyeri	—N/a
62	**Lee Na-eun**	P.O	—N/a
63	**Shownu**	Park Na-rae	—N/a
64	P.O		—N/a
65	Moon Se-yoon, Hyeri	P.O, **JooE**	—N/a
66	Kim Dong-hyun, Moon Se-yoon, **Jang Su-won**	Hyeri	—N/a
67	Hyeri	P.O	—N/a
68	Kim Dong-hyun	Park Na-rae	—N/a
69	Moon Se-yoon	Shin Dong-yup	—N/a
70	Park Na-rae	Moon Se-yoon	—N/a
71	Moon Se-yoon, P.O	**Sunny**	—N/a
72	**Jang Do-yeon**	**Ravi**	—N/a
73	Hyeri	Moon Se-yoon, **Kim Tae-woo**	—N/a
74	**Oh Ha-young**	Moon Se-yoon, **Oh Ha-young**	—N/a
75	**Jung Hye-sung**	**Kim Byung-chul**	—N/a
76	**Mijoo**		—N/a
77	Moon Se-yoon, **Nayeon**, **Chaeyoung**	Hyeri	—N/a
78	P.O		—N/a
79	Moon Se-yoon	**Kim Woo-seok**	—N/a
80	P.O	Hyeri	—N/a
81	Hyeri	P.O	—N/a
82	Nucksal	Moon Se-yoon	—N/a
83	Hyeri	Kim Dong-hyun	—N/a
84	Park Na-rae	Hyeri	—N/a
85	Nucksal	**Jimin**	—N/a
86	Shin Dong-yup	**Lee Hae-ri**	—N/a
87	Park Na-rae	**Ahn Hyun-mo**	—N/a
88	Hyeri	Nucksal, **Simon Dominic**	—N/a
89	**Rosé**	Shin Dong-yup	—N/a
90	Hyeri	Moon Se-yoon	—N/a
91	Hyeri, **Rowoon**	**Rowoon**	—N/a
92	Moon Se-yoon	**Ji Suk-jin**	—N/a
93	Hyeri, **Lee Yi-kyung**	Moon Se-yoon	—N/a
94	**Suho**	Moon Se-yoon	—N/a
95	Moon Se-yoon	Park Na-rae	—N/a
96	Shin Dong-yup	P.O	—N/a
97	Hyeri		—N/a
Unaired Special	Hyeri	Moon Se-yoon	—N/a
98	Moon Se-yoon, **Na Sung-ho**	**Kang Kyun-sung**	—N/a
99-100 (Note: Round 1 was played in episode 99, Round 2 was played in episode 100.)	Kim Dong-hyun	**Yoo Se-yoon**, **Taeyeon**	—N/a
101	Moon Se-yoon	**Hong Jin-kyung**	—N/a
102	Kim Dong-hyun	Moon Se-yoon	—N/a
103	**Sunny**		—N/a
104	P.O	Park Na-rae	—N/a
105	Hyeri	Park Na-rae	—N/a
106	P.O	Moon Se-yoon	—N/a
107	Hyeri		—N/a
108	Moon Se-yoon	**Zico**	—N/a
109	Moon Se-yoon	Moon Se-yoon	—N/a
110	Moon Se-yoon	Park Na-rae	—N/a
111	P.O	Moon Se-yoon	—N/a
112	Shin Dong-yup, Hyeri	Moon Se-yoon, Nucksal	—N/a
113	Nucksal	Kim Dong-hyun	—N/a
114	**Seungkwan**	Nucksal	—N/a
115	Hyeri	Hyeri, **Minhyun**	—N/a
116	Park Na-rae	Nucksal	—N/a
117	Nucksal	Hyeri	—N/a
118	**Baekhyun**	Moon Se-yoon	—N/a
119	Moon Se-yoon, Nucksal, Hyeri	Park Na-rae, Nucksal, P.O, Hyeri	—N/a
120	Kim Dong-hyun	Moon Se-yoon	—N/a
121	P.O	**Uhm Jung-hwa**	—N/a
122	Nucksal	Shin Dong-yup	—N/a
123	Park Na-rae, P.O	Nucksal	—N/a
124	Moon Se-yoon	Hyeri	—N/a
125	Nucksal	Moon Se-yoon	—N/a
126	Moon Se-yoon, Hyeri	Nucksal	—N/a
127	Hyeri	**Code Kunst**, **Lee Hi**	—N/a
128	Moon Se-yoon, **Kim Bum**	**Lee Dong-wook**	—N/a
129	**Jisoo**	P.O	—N/a
130	Moon Se-yoon	P.O	—N/a
131	P.O	Hyeri	—N/a
132	Hyeri	**Jihyo**	—N/a
133	Shin Dong-yup, Nucksal	P.O, Hyeri	—N/a
134	Key	Hyeri	—N/a
135	Moon Se-yoon, Key	Moon Se-yoon	—N/a
136	Key		—N/a
137	Hanhae	Nucksal	—N/a
138	Hanhae	Kim Dong-hyun	—N/a
139	Key	Hanhae	—N/a
140	Hanhae		—N/a
141	Moon Se-yoon, Nucksal, **Jo Se-ho**	Nucksal, Hanhae	—N/a
142	Key	Moon Se-yoon	—N/a
143	Hanhae	Key	—N/a
144	Nucksal	Key	—N/a
145	Moon Se-yoon	Hanhae	—N/a
146	Park Na-rae	—N/a (Note: This round of song dictation was not recorded due to the longer recording time in the Snack Time segment.)	—N/a
147	Hanhae	P.O	—N/a
148	Hanhae	Taeyeon	—N/a
149	Key	Taeyeon	—N/a
150	Key	Moon Se-yoon	—N/a
151	**Kwak Dong-yeon**	P.O	—N/a
152	Taeyeon	Moon Se-yoon	—N/a
153	P.O	**Cha Eun-woo**	—N/a
154	**Lee Chan-hyuk**	Nucksal	—N/a
155	Moon Se-yoon	Hanhae	—N/a
156	Key, **Kang Ha-neul**	Nucksal, Key	—N/a
157	P.O	Key	—N/a
158	Nucksal, Hanhae	**Yuri**	—N/a
159	**Ryujin**	P.O	—N/a
160	Moon Se-yoon	P.O	—N/a
161	Hanhae	Taeyeon	—N/a
162	Hanhae, P.O	Key	—N/a
163	P.O	Taeyeon	—N/a
164	Park Na-rae	Shin Dong-yup	—N/a
165	**Hoshi**	**Seungkwan**	—N/a
166	**Yujeong**	Taeyeon	—N/a
167	Nucksal	Hanhae	—N/a
168	P.O	Key	—N/a
169	Key	Kim Dong-hyun, P.O	—N/a
170	Key	Moon Se-yoon	—N/a
171	P.O	—N/a (Note: Only one round of song dictation is played for each episode of the 2-episode Summer Special.)	—N/a
172	Key	—N/a	—N/a
173	Taeyeon	Hanhae, Key	—N/a
174	P.O		—N/a
175	Moon Se-yoon, Key	P.O	—N/a
176	P.O	Key	—N/a
177	P.O		—N/a
178	Key	P.O	—N/a
179	Hanhae	Nucksal	—N/a
180	P.O	Nucksal, P.O	—N/a
181	Taeyeon	Kim Dong-hyun	—N/a
182	Park Na-rae, Nucksal	Hanhae	—N/a
183	Nucksal, Hanhae	Key	—N/a
184	Hanhae	Taeyeon	—N/a
185	Key	—N/a	—N/a
186	P.O	Park Na-rae, Taeyeon	—N/a
187	P.O	Taeyeon	—N/a
188	Key	Hanhae	—N/a
189	P.O	Key	—N/a
190	P.O	Key	—N/a
191	**Gong Seung-yeon**	Park Na-rae	—N/a
192	Key	Taeyeon	—N/a
193	P.O	Hanhae	—N/a
194	P.O	Key	—N/a
195	Key	P.O	—N/a
196	P.O	Moon Se-yoon, Key	—N/a
197	Key	—N/a	—N/a
198	Key		—N/a
199	Key	Key, P.O	—N/a
200	P.O	—N/a (Note: Only one round of song dictation is played in this Special Episode.)	—N/a
201	P.O	**Ahn Bo-hyun**, **Jo Bo-ah**	—N/a
202	Key	P.O	—N/a
203	Moon Se-yoon	Taeyeon	—N/a
204	Hanhae	Nucksal	—N/a
205	Hanhae		—N/a
206	Park Na-rae	Key	—N/a
207	Shin Dong-yup & Nucksal	—N/a	—N/a
208	Key	P.O	—N/a
209	Kim Dong-hyun	Key	—N/a
210	Key	Hanhae	—N/a
211	Nucksal	Taeyeon	—N/a
212	Key	Hanhae	—N/a
213	Moon Se-yoon, Park Na-rae, Key	Taeyeon	—N/a
214	Hanhae	Key	—N/a
215	Nucksal	Hanhae	—N/a
216	Moon Se-yoon		—N/a
217	Moon Se-yoon	Key	—N/a
218	Moon Se-yoon, Taeyeon	Key	—N/a
219	Key	Hanhae	—N/a
220	Key	Moon Se-yoon	—N/a
221	Key	Taeyeon	—N/a
222	Hanhae, Key	Moon Se-yoon	—N/a
223	**An Yu-jin**	—N/a	—N/a
224	**Sunny**	—N/a	—N/a
225	Hanhae	Hanhae, Key	—N/a
226	Key	Nucksal	—N/a
227	Hanhae		—N/a
228	Nucksal	Key	—N/a
229	Moon Se-yoon, Nucksal	Moon Se-yoon	—N/a
230	Taeyeon	Nucksal	—N/a
231	**Crush**	Moon Se-yoon	—N/a
232	Key		—N/a
233	Hanhae, Key, **Seulgi**	Nucksal	—N/a
234	**Kim Yoo-jung**	Key	—N/a
235	Key	Park Na-rae	—N/a
236	**Lee Chan-hyuk**	Key	—N/a
237	Nucksal	Taeyeon	—N/a
238	Hanhae	Moon Se-yoon	—N/a
239	**Jung Seung-hwan**	Hanhae	—N/a
240	Moon Se-yoon	Moon Se-yoon, Hanhae	—N/a
241	Hanhae	Moon Se-yoon, Nucksal, **Sunny**	—N/a
242	**Sunny**		—N/a
243	Key	Nucksal	—N/a
244	—N/a (Note: No one shot is provided in the Relay Song Dictation that was played in some episodes.)		—N/a
245	—N/a		—N/a
246	Hanhae	Shin Dong-yup	—N/a
247	Moon Se-yoon, Nucksal	Hanhae	—N/a
248	Hanhae	Park Na-rae	—N/a
249	Moon Se-yoon, Nucksal	Taeyeon, Key	—N/a
250	Moon Se-yoon	Hanhae	—N/a
251	Nucksal	Key	—N/a
252	Park Na-rae	Nucksal, Hanhae	—N/a
253	Hanhae	**Hwang Min-hyun**	—N/a
254	**Jihyo**	**Jeongyeon**	—N/a
255	Hanhae	Taeyeon	—N/a
256	Park Na-rae, Hanhae	Nucksal	—N/a
257	Hanhae	Taeyeon	—N/a
258	—N/a		—N/a
259	**Lee Guk-joo**		—N/a
260	**Jang Hyuk**	Key	—N/a
261	—N/a (Note: No one shot is provided in this episode.)		—N/a
262	**Lee Dong-wook**	Moon Se-yoon	—N/a
263	Hanhae	Nucksal	—N/a
264	Hanhae	Key	—N/a
265	Moon Se-yoon, Hanhae, Nucksal, Taeyeon	Shin Dong-yup	—N/a
266	Shin Dong-yup	Nucksal, Key, **Lee Joon-hyuk**	—N/a
267	Hanhae, Key	Nucksal	—N/a
268	**Park Ha-sun**	Shin Dong-yup, Moon Se-yoon, Nucksal, Key	—N/a
269	Hanhae	**Chun Woo-hee**	—N/a
270	Hanhae	Key	—N/a
271	Key	Moon Se-yoon	—N/a
272	Hanhae, **Sung Han-bin**	—N/a	—N/a
273	Shin Dong-yup	**Park Jeong-min**	—N/a
274	Key	Hanhae	—N/a
275	**Arin**	Kim Dong-hyun	—N/a
276	Key	Hanhae	—N/a
277	Key, **Kwon Eun-bi**	Shin Dong-yup, Key	—N/a
278	Hanhae	Park Na-rae, Key	—N/a
279	Park Na-rae	Moon Se-yoon	—N/a
280	Hanhae		—N/a
281	Nucksal		—N/a
282	Nucksal	Hanhae	—N/a
283	Key		—N/a
284	**Kim Min-seok**	Hanhae, Key	—N/a
285	Moon Se-yoon	—N/a	—N/a
286	**Chuu**	Hanhae	—N/a
287	**Seungkwan**	Moon Se-yoon	—N/a
288	Hanhae	Taeyeon	—N/a
289	P.O	Key	—N/a
290	Key, P.O	P.O	—N/a
291	P.O	Moon Se-yoon	—N/a
292	Key	Taeyeon	—N/a
293	Moon Se-yoon, Nucksal	P.O	—N/a
294	P.O	Key	—N/a
295	P.O	Hanhae	—N/a
296	Park Na-rae, Taeyeon	Hanhae	—N/a
297	Park Na-rae	Hanhae	—N/a
298	Hanhae	**Lee Dong-wook**	—N/a
299	Key	Nucksal	—N/a
300	Key, (Note: For this song dictation round, since Key is a mafia, which means he knew all the correct lyrics beforehand, this One Shot would not be included in the statistics.) P.O	—N/a	—N/a
301	Key	Hanhae	—N/a
302	P.O		—N/a
303	Hanhae	Key	—N/a
304	**Seo Eun-kwang**	Key	—N/a
305	Park Na-rae	**Chungha**	—N/a
306	Nucksal	Taeyeon, **Jung Hyuk**	—N/a
307	Key	P.O	—N/a
308	Taeyeon	Hanhae	—N/a
309	—N/a		—N/a
310	—N/a		—N/a
311	**Park Ji-yoon**, **Choi Ye-na**	**Choi Ye-na**	—N/a
312	Moon Se-yoon	Nucksal	—N/a
313	P.O		—N/a
314	**Kim So-hyun**	Taeyeon	—N/a
315	P.O	Hanhae, Key	—N/a
316	Key	P.O	—N/a
317	P.O	—N/a	—N/a
318	Key	Shin Dong-yup	—N/a
319	P.O		—N/a
320	Moon Se-yoon, Nucksal, P.O, **Yoo Jun-sang**	Taeyeon	—N/a
321	P.O	Taeyeon, Key	—N/a
322	P.O	Hanhae	—N/a
323	Hanhae	Hanhae, P.O	—N/a
324	P.O	**Seungmin**	—N/a
325	P.O	—N/a	—N/a
326	Park Na-rae, Nucksal, P.O	Key	—N/a
327	Key		—N/a
328	**Jung Hae-in**	Hanhae	—N/a
329	P.O	Hanhae	—N/a
330	**Park Yong-in**	P.O	—N/a
331	Moon Se-yoon		—N/a
332	Key		—N/a
333	P.O	Hanhae	—N/a
334	Moon Se-yoon	Hanhae	—N/a
335	Taeyeon, Key, **K.Will**	Key	—N/a
336	Moon Se-yoon, Nucksal	Hanhae	—N/a
337	Moon Se-yoon	**Ji Ye-eun**	—N/a
338	Shin Dong-yup	P.O	—N/a
339	P.O	Key, P.O	—N/a
340	Hanhae	Key	—N/a
341	Hanhae	Key	—N/a
342	Key	Taeyeon	—N/a
343	Hanhae	Key	—N/a
344	Hanhae, Key	Hanhae	—N/a
345	Moon Se-yoon	P.O	—N/a
346	Hanhae		—N/a
347	P.O	Moon Se-yoon, **Onew**	—N/a
348	Moon Se-yoon	Key	—N/a
349	Key	Taeyeon	—N/a
350	Taeyeon	**Umji**	—N/a
351	Park Na-rae, Hanhae, Key	Hanhae	—N/a
352	Key	Hanhae	—N/a
353	Key		—N/a
354	Moon Se-yoon	Moon Se-yoon, Park Na-rae, P.O, **Jung Yi-lang**	—N/a
355	Hanhae		—N/a
356	P.O	Hanhae	—N/a
357	Nucksal	Taeyeon, Key	—N/a
358	Nucksal	Shin Dong-yup	—N/a
359	Moon Se-yoon	—N/a	—N/a
360	—N/a (Note: For the show's 7th Anniversary, no song dictation would be played at all for the first time in the show's history.)		—N/a
361	Hanhae	Park Na-rae	—N/a
362	Shin Dong-yup, Key, P.O	P.O	—N/a
363	Moon Se-yoon, Park Na-rae, Hanhae	Key	—N/a
364	Hanhae	Key	—N/a
365	**Yoo Su-bin**	Taeyeon, Hanhae	—N/a
366	Key	**Bibi**	—N/a
367	P.O	Taeyeon	—N/a
368	Key	Moon Se-yoon	—N/a
369	P.O	Hanhae	—N/a
370	Park Na-rae, P.O	P.O	—N/a
371	Key		—N/a
372	Hanhae		—N/a
373	Hanhae	Taeyeon	—N/a
374	Hanhae	Key, P.O	—N/a
375	Taeyeon	—N/a	—N/a
376	Hanhae		—N/a
377	Key	Moon Se-yoon	—N/a
378	Key		—N/a
379	Key	Moon Se-yoon	—N/a
380	Key	Taeyeon	—N/a
381	P.O	Park Na-rae, Hanhae	—N/a
382	Park Na-rae	—N/a (Note: Only one round of song dictation is played in this course meal program format.)	—N/a
383	**Bbaek Ga**	—N/a	—N/a
384	Key	—N/a	—N/a
385	P.O	—N/a	—N/a
386	Hanhae	—N/a	—N/a
387	P.O, **Kim Min-seok**	—N/a	—N/a
388	**Myung Jae-hyun**	—N/a	—N/a
389	Hanhae, P.O	—N/a	—N/a
390	Key	—N/a	—N/a
391	Park Na-rae, Taeyeon	—N/a	—N/a
392	P.O	—N/a	—N/a
393	Taeyeon, Key, P.O	—N/a	—N/a
394	Key, P.O	—N/a	—N/a
395	P.O	—N/a	—N/a
396	Moon Se-yoon	—N/a	—N/a
397	Taeyeon	—N/a	—N/a
398	P.O	—N/a	—N/a
399	Hanhae	—N/a	—N/a
400	Hanhae	—N/a	—N/a
401	Hanhae	—N/a	—N/a
402	Moon Se-yoon	—N/a	—N/a
403	Hanhae, **Orbit**	—N/a	—N/a
404	Hanhae	—N/a	—N/a
405	Nucksal, Hanhae	—N/a	—N/a
406	P.O	—N/a	—N/a
407	Moon Se-yoon, Nucksal, **Zo Zazz**	—N/a	—N/a
408	Hanhae	—N/a	—N/a
409	P.O	—N/a	—N/a
410	**Yeonjun**	—N/a	—N/a
411	—N/a	—N/a	—N/a
412	Hanhae	—N/a	—N/a
413	Taeyeon	—N/a	—N/a
414	Moon Se-yoon	—N/a	—N/a
415	P.O	—N/a	—N/a
416	P.O	—N/a	—N/a
417	**Haewon**	—N/a	—N/a
418	P.O	—N/a	—N/a
419	P.O	—N/a	—N/a
420	Moon Se-yoon, Taeyeon	—N/a	—N/a
421	Hanhae	—N/a	—N/a
422	**Woonhak**	—N/a	—N/a
423	P.O	—N/a	—N/a
424	Moon Se-yoon	—N/a	—N/a
425	Hanhae, P.O	—N/a	—N/a
426	Moon Se-yoon	—N/a	—N/a
427	P.O	—N/a	—N/a
428	P.O	—N/a	—N/a

=== First Place One Shot statistics (Cast members only) ===
As of episode 428, the statistics for the First Place One Shots received by cast members are as listed:

No.	Name	No. of First Place One Shots
1	Key (Note: Number includes 1 One Shot from episode 207, as he (with Small-mouthed Haetnim) came in first in the special opening segment "Dictation Escape Room".)	161
2	Hanhae	134
3	P.O	117
4	Moon Se-yoon (Note: Number does not include 1 One Shot from the Unaired Special.)	111
5	Nucksal	70
6	Park Na-rae	54
7	Hyeri	49
8	Taeyeon (Note: Number includes 1 One Shot from episode 100, when she appeared as a guest.)	45
9	Shin Dong-yup (Note: Number includes 1 One Shot from episode 200, as he came in first in the special opening segment "Dictation Escape Room".)	25
10	Kim Dong-hyun	16
11	Young K	0

=== Last Place One Shot ===
Starting Episode 201, the Last Place One Shot is given to the cast member/guest who has the least number of correct characters (in Hangul) written down in comparison to the correct answer on the first listen. However, unlike the First Place One Shot, the Last Place One Shot is only awarded once per episode, in either the first or second round of dictation when the cast members and the guests decide to use the Last Place's Listen Again Chance. The recipient — or one of the recipients (in case of a tie) — of the Last Place One Shot will be, then, eligible to use the Last Place's Listen Again Chance.

As of episode 427, the statistics for the Last Place One Shots received by cast members are as listed:

Name	No. of Last Place One Shots	Episodes
Kim Dong-hyun	42	201, 216, 217, 219, 222, 224, 228, 229, 231, 240, 241, 246, 260, 264, 267, 269, 270, 273, 279, 286, 287, 311, 316, 319, 321, 332, 336, 341, 347, 350, 366, 367, 380, 388, 392, 393, 396, 397, 405, 406, 418, 427
Shin Dong-yup	32	202, 211, 213, 214, 221, 232, 253, 287, 298, 301, 303, 308, 315, 323, 326, 327, 337, 339, 340, 357, 361, 373, 379, 386, 387, 390, 392, 401, 407, 411, 424
Moon Se-yoon	12	204, 207, 217, 219, 234, 254, 271, 312, 322, 364, 370, 409
Park Na-rae	10	206, 207, 230, 284, 320, 324, 328, 357, 361, 392
Taeyeon	9	204, 212, 247, 250, 293, 295, 321, 343, 392
Hanhae	9	201, 271, 275, 292, 293, 294, 307, 314, 415
Nucksal	8	294, 304, 314, 318, 331, 391, 419, 421
Key	1	210
P.O	1	420
Young K	0	

=== One Shot Hall of Fame ===
The guests who got First Place One Shots in both rounds of song dictation in an episode would be placed in the Hall of Fame. If the guests are of a same group, and the member(s) of the group got First Place One Shots in both rounds of song dictation in an episode, the group would be placed in the Hall of Fame. From Episode 382, as there would be only one round of song dictation in each episode, there would be no more Hall of Fame entries to be recorded.

Eleven guests are placed in the Hall of Fame, as listed:

No.	Hall of Fame Receiver	Episode
1	Park Ji-sun	29, 60
2	Woo Ji-yoon	52
3	Lee Yong-jin	54
4	Oh Ha-young	74
5	Mijoo	76
6	Rowoon	91
7	Sunny	103, 242
8	Seventeen (Note: As Seventeen members Hoshi and Seungkwan got One Shots in the first and second rounds of song dictation respectively, the group would be inducted into the Hall of Fame.)	165
9	Twice (Note: As Twice members Jihyo and Jeongyeon got One Shots in the first and second rounds of song dictation respectively, the group would be inducted into the Hall of Fame.)	254
10	Lee Guk-joo	259
11	Choi Ye-na	311

== Perfect Game ==
A Perfect Game happens when the cast and the guests succeed both song dictation rounds in their first attempts. The term "Perfect Game" was first used and seen in the editors' caption in Episode 14, following the first attempt successes in both rounds of song dictation. As a result of these episodes, Haetnim was unable to eat anything, thus the term "perfect". From Episode 382, as there would be only one round of song dictation in each episode, there would be no more perfect games to be recorded.

There were thirteen perfect games, as listed:

Episode	Guest(s)
14	Wanna One (Ong Seong-wu, Lee Dae-hwi)
41	WJSN (Luda, Dayoung)
104	Max Changmin (TVXQ), Kyuhyun (Super Junior)
154	AKMU
157	Treasure (Jihoon, Park Jeong-woo)
165	Seventeen (S.Coups, Hoshi, Seungkwan)
178	Hyuna, Dawn
194	Haha, Byul
240	Kim Won-hoon, Cho Jin-se, Eom Ji-yoon
253	Jung Hyuk, Hwang Min-hyun, Juyeon (The Boyz)
314	Kim So-hyun, Son Jun-ho
328	Jung Hae-in, Jung So-min, Kim Ji-eun
348	Julien Kang, Jong Tae-se, Mo Tae-bum

== Snack Time ==
The cast member(s) or guest(s) who won the snack first and last, and the cast member/guest who failed to win the snack from the Snack Time game are as listed:

(Names in bold are the guests of the episodes.)

Snack Time

Episode	Game	First	Last	Failed
1	—N/a (Note: Snack Time started from Episode 5)			
2	—N/a			
3	—N/a			
4	—N/a			
5	New/Old Neologism Quiz	Hyeri	Hanhae	Moon Se-yoon
6	North Korean Cultural Quiz	Kim Dong-hyun	Moon Se-yoon	Hanhae
7	New/Old Neologism Quiz	Park Na-rae	Hyeri	Moon Se-yoon
8	New/Old OST Quiz (Dramas)	Key	Hanhae	Kim Dong-hyun
9	What Is This Food?	Park Na-rae	**Seolhyun**	Moon Se-yoon
10	Voice Support Quiz (Dramas)	Hyeri	Hanhae	Kim Dong-hyun
11	Your Eyes, Nose, Lips Quiz	Hyeri	Hanhae	Kim Dong-hyun
12	New/Old OST Quiz (Movies)	Hanhae	**Lee Na-gyung**	Kim Dong-hyun
13	Voice Support Quiz (Advertisements)	Hyeri	Moon Se-yoon	Kim Dong-hyun
14	Voice Support Quiz (Dramas)	Moon Se-yoon	Kim Dong-hyun	Hanhae
15	New/Old Neologism Quiz	Hyeri	**Danny Ahn**	Shin Dong-yup
16	Your Eyes, Nose, Lips Quiz	**Tyler Rasch**	**Han Hyun-min**	Shin Dong-yup
17	Consonants Quiz (Korean Movies)	Hanhae	Kim Dong-hyun	**Yoo Min-sang**
18	Your Eyes, Nose Lips Quiz	Hyeri	Kim Dong-hyun	Moon Se-yoon
19	New/Old OST Quiz (Foreign Movies)	Hanhae	Key	Park Na-rae
20	Voice Support Quiz (Variety Shows)	**Hwang Chi-yeul**	Hanhae	Kim Dong-hyun
21	Love Love Couple Quiz	**Jisoo**	Kim Dong-hyun	Key
22	New/Old Neologism Quiz	Hyeri	**Kim Jong-min**	Moon Se-yoon
23	Your Eyes, Nose Lips Quiz	Key	**Donghae**	Kim Dong-hyun
24	Find The Fanclub Owner	Moon Se-yoon	**YooA**	Hanhae
25	New/Old BGM Quiz (Games)	Key	Moon Se-yoon	Park Na-rae
26	New/Old BGM Quiz (Variety Shows)	**Ji Sang-ryeol**	Hanhae	Hyeri
27	Love Love Couple Quiz	Hyeri	**JB**	Moon Se-yoon
28	Voice Support Quiz (Comedy Famous Lines)	Hyeri	Shin Dong-yup	Kim Dong-hyun
29	Translator Quiz (Korean Movies; English Accent)	Hyeri	Shin Dong-yup	Hanhae
30	Dictionary Battle	Park Na-rae	Hanhae	Kim Dong-hyun
31	Translator Quiz (Dramas; Japanese and Chinese Accents)	**Parc Jae-jung**	Key	Moon Se-yoon
32	Dictionary Battle	Park Na-rae	Shin Dong-yup	Moon Se-yoon
33	New/Old OST Quiz (Animations)	Key	Hanhae	Kim Dong-hyun
34	Translator Quiz (Korean Songs; Japanese Accent)	Key	**Soyou**	Hyeri
35	Your Eyes, Nose, Lips Quiz	Key	Moon Se-yoon	Shin Dong-yup
36	North Korean Cultural Quiz	Moon Se-yoon	**Wendy**	Park Na-rae
37	Consonants Quiz (Snack Brands)	Hyeri	Kim Dong-hyun	Moon Se-yoon
38	New/Old OST Quiz (Dramas)	Hanhae	Moon Se-yoon	Kim Dong-hyun
39	New/Old Neologism Quiz	**Kang Seung-yoon**	**Song Min-ho**	Kim Dong-hyun
40	Voice Support Quiz (Dramas)	Kim Dong-hyun	Shin Dong-yup	Hanhae
41	Lyrics Reading Quiz	Key	Shin Dong-yup	Kim Dong-hyun
42	Love Love Couple Quiz	Hyeri	Kim Dong-hyun	**Park Sung-kwang**
43	New/Old BGM Quiz (Television Programs)	Moon Se-yoon	Hanhae	Kim Dong-hyun
44	Doppelganger Quiz	Park Na-rae	Hyeri	Moon Se-yoon
45	Dialect Tour	Hyeri	**Yang Se-chan**	**Lee Yong-jin**
46	Lyrics Reading Quiz	Moon Se-yoon	**Taemin**	Hanhae
47	Consonants Quiz (Ice Cream Brands)	**Rowoon**	Shin Dong-yup	**Chani**
48	Doppelganger Quiz	Hyeri	Moon Se-yoon	Kim Dong-hyun
49	Translator Quiz (Korean Dramas; Japanese and English Accents)	Hyeri	Kim Dong-hyun	Park Na-rae
50	I Can See Your Title (Movies)	Key	Moon Se-yoon	Kim Dong-hyun
51	Dictionary Battle	Park Na-rae	**Jin Hae-sung**	Hyeri
52	Consonants Quiz (Ramyeon Brands)	**Woo Ji-yoon**	Nucksal	Kim Dong-hyun
53	New/Old Neologism Quiz	Nucksal	P.O	Kim Dong-hyun
54	Lyrics Reading Quiz	Hyeri	Kim Dong-hyun	**Lee Jin-ho**
55	Voice Support Quiz (Variety Shows)	Park Na-rae	**Ravi**	Kim Dong-hyun
56	New/Old OST Quiz (Foreign Dramas)	Shin Dong-yup	Kim Dong-hyun	P.O
57	Your Eyes, Nose, Lips Quiz (Actors/Actresses)	Hyeri	Kim Dong-hyun	Park Na-rae
58	Consonants Quiz (Drinks Brands)	Nucksal	Park Na-rae	P.O
59	Doppelganger Quiz	Nucksal	**Ahn Hyun-mo**	Kim Dong-hyun
60	New/Old OST Quiz (Animations)	Park Na-rae	**Park Ji-sun**	Moon Se-yoon
61	Find The Original Singer	Moon Se-yoon	Nucksal	Kim Dong-hyun
62	Lyrics Reading Quiz	Park Na-rae	Shin Dong-yup	Nucksal
63	Love Love Couple Quiz	Nucksal	**Luda**	Kim Dong-hyun
64	Face/Off	Hyeri	**Han Hye-jin**	Kim Dong-hyun
65	Consonants Quiz (Korean Fried Chicken Brands)	Hyeri	**JooE**	Moon Se-yoon
66	New/Old Neologism Quiz	Shin Dong-yup	Nucksal	Kim Dong-hyun
67	Dialect Tour	Kim Dong-hyun	Shin Dong-yup	**Lee Sung-jong**
68	Consonants Quiz (Movies)	Hyeri	P.O	**Yoo Se-yoon**
69	Doppelganger Quiz	**Park Sung-woong**	Moon Se-yoon	Kim Dong-hyun
70	New/Old OST Quiz (Dramas)	Hyeri	**Choi Jae-woong**	Nucksal
71	Lyrics Reading Quiz	**Taeyeon**	Nucksal	P.O
72	Love Love Couple Quiz	Hyeri	**Jang Do-yeon**	**Lee Hyun-yi**
73	Find The Original Singer	Nucksal	Kim Dong-hyun	P.O
74	Doppelganger Quiz (Singers)	Park Na-rae	Nucksal	Kim Dong-hyun
75	Consonants Quiz (Hamburger Brands)	Shin Dong-yup	Kim Dong-hyun	Moon Se-yoon
76	Dialect Tour	Shin Dong-yup	Nucksal	Kim Dong-hyun
77	Lyrics Reading Quiz	Hyeri	Nucksal	Kim Dong-hyun
78	Find The Hidden Real Name	Kim Dong-hyun	**Baek Ji-young**	Nucksal
79	I Can See Your Title (Movies)	P.O	Shin Dong-yup	Moon Se-yoon
80	Voice Support Quiz (Dramas)	Moon Se-yoon	Nucksal	P.O
81	New/Old BGM Quiz (Television Programs)	Kim Dong-hyun	Nucksal	P.O
82	Noraebang Accompaniment Quiz (Trot Songs)	Moon Se-yoon	**Shownu**	Kim Dong-hyun
83	Doppelganger Quiz (Actors/Actresses)	Shin Dong-yup	P.O	Kim Dong-hyun
84	Find The Original Singer	**Narsha**	**Miryo**	Nucksal
85	Noraebang Accompaniment Quiz (2049 Noraebang Top Songs)	Hyeri	Park Na-rae	Kim Dong-hyun
86	Character Expression Quiz	**Lee Hae-ri**	**Kang Min-kyung**	P.O
87	Consonants Quiz (Ramyeon Brands Part 2)	**Rhymer**	Kim Dong-hyun	Shin Dong-yup
88	Dialect Tour	Shin Dong-yup	Nucksal	Kim Dong-hyun
89	Choreography Décalcomanie Quiz	Park Na-rae	Kim Dong-hyun	Nucksal
90	Relation Between The Two?	Park Na-rae	Shin Dong-yup	Kim Dong-hyun
91	I Can See Your Title (Dramas)	Hyeri	Kim Dong-hyun	Nucksal
92	Noraebang Accompaniment Quiz (Trot Songs)	Hyeri	**Ji Suk-jin**	**Yang Se-chan**
93	Doppelganger Quiz	Hyeri	Kim Dong-hyun	**Jung Joon-ho**
94	Lyrics Reading Quiz	**Kyuhyun**	Park Na-rae	Nucksal
95	Consonants Quiz (Korean Fried Chicken Brands)	Moon Se-yoon	Park Na-rae	**Lee Yong-jin**
96	I Can See Your Title (Movies, Dramas)	Hyeri	Moon Se-yoon	P.O
97	Noraebang Accompaniment Quiz	**Lee Ji-hye**	**Ravi**	P.O
Unaired Special	New/Old Neologism Quiz	Hyeri	Kim Dong-hyun	P.O
98	Find The Original Singer	Hyeri	Nucksal	Kim Dong-hyun
99 (Note: The snack game was changed to the second one after Yura succeeded in getting the snack.)	Consonants Quiz (Snack Brands)	**Yoo Se-yoon**	**Yura**	Nucksal
99	Noraebang Accompaniment Quiz	Park Na-rae	**Ravi**	Nucksal
100 (Note: The snack game was changed to the second one after Kim Dong-hyun succeeded in getting the snack.)	Lyrics Reading Quiz	**Yoo Se-yoon**	Kim Dong-hyun	**Ravi**
100	Doppelganger Quiz (Actors/Actresses)	Nucksal	**Yura**	**Ravi**
101	Doppelganger Quiz (Variety Shows)	**Nam Chang-hee**	Moon Se-yoon	P.O
102	New/Old Neologism Quiz	**Song So-hee**	Kim Dong-hyun	Moon Se-yoon
103	Choreography Décalcomanie Quiz	Moon Se-yoon	Kim Dong-hyun	**Hyoyeon**
104	Consonants Quiz (2000s Songs Titles)	Moon Se-yoon	Kim Dong-hyun	Park Na-rae
105	Love Love Couple Quiz	P.O	**Park Mi-sun**	Moon Se-yoon
106	Find The Original Singer	Hyeri	**Arin**	Kim Dong-hyun
107	What's Your Name? (Mobile Phones)	**Eunhyuk**	Nucksal	Shin Dong-yup
108	Noraebang Accompaniment Quiz	Moon Se-yoon	Shin Dong-yup	Nucksal
109	Doppelganger Quiz (Actors/Actresses)	Hyeri	**Jeong Se-woon**	Kim Dong-hyun
110	Lyrics Feeling Drama Quiz	**Seulgi**	Nucksal	Kim Dong-hyun
111	Guess Them Right! Homes	P.O	Moon Se-yoon	Kim Dong-hyun
112	Gag Corner Title Quiz	Park Na-rae	Hyeri	Kim Dong-hyun
113	Consonants Quiz (Drinks Brands)	**Kim Kang-hoon**	Nucksal	Moon Se-yoon
114	Lyrics Reading Quiz	Hyeri	Nucksal	Kim Dong-hyun
115	New/Old Neologism Quiz	**Minhyun**	Moon Se-yoon	Kim Dong-hyun
116	Noraebang Accompaniment Quiz	Kim Dong-hyun	Park Na-rae	P.O
117	Lyrics Reading Quiz	Hyeri	Shin Dong-yup	P.O
118	Lyrics Feeling Drama Quiz	Shin Dong-yup	Nucksal	P.O
119	Consonants Quiz (Korean Movies)	P.O	Shin Dong-yup	**Hwang Jung-min**
120	New/Old OST Quiz (Dramas)	Park Na-rae	Kim Dong-hyun	Nucksal
121	Doppelganger Quiz	Nucksal	Kim Dong-hyun	Moon Se-yoon
122	Choreography Décalcomanie Quiz	Hyeri	Kim Dong-hyun	Nucksal
123	Consonants Quiz (2000s Songs Titles)	Hyeri	P.O	**Ravi**
124	Doppelganger Quiz (Actors/Actresses)	Hyeri	Moon Se-yoon	Shin Dong-yup
125	Lyrics Feeling Drama Quiz	**Lee Ji-hye**	P.O	Kim Dong-hyun
126	New/Old OST Quiz (Dramas)	**Lee Na-eun**	Kim Dong-hyun	Shin Dong-yup
127	Consonants Quiz (Ramyeon Brands)	Shin Dong-yup	Kim Dong-hyun	Nucksal
128	Guess Them Right! Homes	Hyeri	Kim Dong-hyun	Moon Se-yoon
129	Noraebang Accompaniment Quiz	**Jisoo**	Nucksal	P.O
130	Love Love Couple Quiz	**Jang Dong-yoon**	Shin Dong-yup	Kim Dong-hyun
131	Find The Original Singer	**Key**	Kim Dong-hyun	**Hanhae**
132	New/Old Neologism Quiz	Park Na-rae	Nucksal	Kim Dong-hyun
133	Lyrics Reading Quiz	**Lee Juck**	Kim Dong-hyun	Nucksal
134	Noraebang Accompaniment Quiz	Moon Se-yoon	Park Na-rae	Hanhae
135	Who Are Today's 1st Place Nominees?	Park Na-rae	**Kai**	Kim Dong-hyun
136	Consonants Quiz (Korean Fried Chicken Brands)	Key	**Ravi**	**Kai**
137	Lyrics Feeling Drama Quiz	Key	Taeyeon	Shin Dong-yup
138	Doppelganger Quiz (Actors/Actresses)	P.O	Moon Se-yoon	Hanhae
139	Guess The Debut Song	Nucksal	**Song Min-ho**	Kim Dong-hyun
140	Dialect Tour	Shin Dong-yup	Nucksal	Moon Se-yoon
141	Find The Source of This Meme	P.O	**Jo Se-ho**	Kim Dong-hyun
142	Choreography Décalcomanie Quiz	Key	Shin Dong-yup	P.O
143	Find The Original Singer	**DJ Tukutz**	Kim Dong-hyun	**Tablo**
144	Lyrics Feeling Drama Quiz	P.O	Nucksal	Kim Dong-hyun
145	Guess Them Right! Homes	Key	Kim Dong-hyun	Hanhae
146	Who Are Today's 1st Place Nominees?	Nucksal	Kim Dong-hyun	P.O
147	Love Love Couple Quiz	**Jo Byeong-gyu**	P.O	Kim Dong-hyun
148	Doppelganger Quiz (Actors/Actresses)	**Lee Seung-gi**	Kim Dong-hyun	Shin Dong-yup
149	New/Old Neologism Quiz	Key	Moon Se-yoon	Shin Dong-yup
150	Guess The First Winning Song	Shin Dong-yup	Nucksal	Moon Se-yoon
151	New/Old OST Quiz (Dramas)	P.O	Moon Se-yoon	Kim Dong-hyun
152	Noraebang Accompaniment Quiz	Park Na-rae	P.O	Nucksal
153 (Note: 2 bonus rounds are played as Hyeri made a surprise appearance. In bonus round 1, where Cha Eun-woo played against Hyeri, the former won and he can eat the snack. In bonus round 2, where Kim Dong-hyun played against Hyeri, the latter won and she can eat the snack.)	Guess The Debut Song	P.O	Kim Dong-hyun	**Cha Eun-woo**
154	Lyrics Reading Quiz	Key	P.O	**Lee Chan-hyuk**
155	Who Are Today's 1st Place Nominees?	**Hyojung**	Kim Dong-hyun	Taeyeon
156	Guess Them Right! Homes	Key	Nucksal	Moon Se-yoon
157	Guess The First Winning Song	Key	**Park Jeong-woo**	P.O
158	Consonants Quiz (21st Century's Songs Titles)	Key	**Hyoyeon**	Kim Dong-hyun
159	Who Is Today's Ending Fairy?	**Ryujin**	Hanhae	Kim Dong-hyun
160	Noraebang Accompaniment Quiz	Key	Nucksal	**Hong Hyun-hee**
161	Lyrics Feeling Drama Quiz	Key	Shin Dong-yup	Kim Dong-hyun
162	New/Old OST Quiz (Dramas)	P.O	Hanhae	Kim Dong-hyun
163	Find The Original Singer	**Kim Hae-jun**	Key	Taeyeon
164	Who Are Today's 1st Place Nominees?	Nucksal	Kim Dong-hyun	Park Na-rae
165	Who Is Today's Ending Fairy?	Taeyeon	Hanhae	Nucksal
166	Voice Support Quiz (Advertisements)	Hanhae	Moon Se-yoon	Kim Dong-hyun
167	Lyrics Feeling Drama Quiz	Shin Dong-yup	P.O	Kim Dong-hyun
168	Consonants Quiz (Ramyeon Brands)	Key	**Defconn**	Hanhae
169	I Can See Your Title (Movies & Dramas)	Taeyeon	**Song Ji-hyo**	P.O
170	Guess The First Winning Song	P.O	Nucksal	Park Na-rae
171 (Note: The snack game was changed to the second one after Shin Dong-yup succeeded in getting the snack.)	Singing Scene Quiz	Park Na-rae	Shin Dong-yup	Hanhae
171	Doppelganger Quiz (Actors/Actresses)	Key	Kim Dong-hyun	Hanhae
172 (Note: The snack game was changed to the second one after Minhyuk succeeded in getting the snack.)	Music Show MC Ment Quiz	**Hwang Kwang-hee**	**Minhyuk**	Nucksal
172	Who Is Today's Ending Fairy?	**Jaejae**	**Wooyoung**	Nucksal
173	Consonants Quiz (2010s Songs Titles)	Shin Dong-yup	Kim Dong-hyun	Hanhae
174	Find The Source of This Meme	Moon Se-yoon	Nucksal	P.O
175	Find The Original Singer	Taeyeon	Key	Nucksal
176	Voice Support Quiz (Advertisements)	Key	**Jang Young-ran**	Kim Dong-hyun
177	New/Old Neologism Quiz	**Gaeko**	Moon Se-yoon	Kim Dong-hyun
178	Choreography Décalcomanie Quiz	Taeyeon	Moon Se-yoon	P.O
179	Consonants Quiz (Hamburger Brands)	**San**	Moon Se-yoon	Hanhae
180	New/Old OST Quiz (Dramas)	P.O	Kim Dong-hyun	Hanhae
181	Lyrics Reading Quiz	Hanhae	Key	Shin Dong-yup
182	Noraebang Accompaniment Quiz	**Mingyu**	Nucksal	Kim Dong-hyun
183	Guess Them Right! Homes	**Go Ah-sung**	Hanhae	Kim Dong-hyun
184	Lyrics Feeling Drama Quiz	Shin Dong-yup	**Han Sun-hwa**	P.O
185	What's Your Name? (Choreography)	P.O	Taeyeon	Moon Se-yoon
186	Music Video Scene Quiz	Hanhae	Moon Se-yoon	Kim Dong-hyun
187	Consonants Quiz (2000s Songs Titles)	Hanhae	Kim Dong-hyun	**Joohoney**
188	Dialect Tour	Nucksal	Moon Se-yoon	Kim Dong-hyun
189	Noraebang Accompaniment Quiz	Moon Se-yoon	Taeyeon	Hanhae
190	New/Old OST Quiz (Dramas)	P.O	Moon Se-yoon	Park Na-rae
191	New/Old Neologism Quiz	**Gong Seung-yeon**	Kim Dong-hyun	Hanhae
192	Find The Source of This Meme	Nucksal	Park Na-rae	Kim Dong-hyun
193	Doppelganger Quiz (Actors/Actresses)	Hanhae	Kim Dong-hyun	P.O
194	Consonants Quiz (Ramyeon Brands)	Key	**Byul**	**Haha**
195	Find The Original Singer	Shin Dong-yup	Moon Se-yoon	P.O
196	Voice Support Quiz (Variety Shows)	Key	Nucksal	Kim Dong-hyun
197	Noraebang Accompaniment Quiz (Trot Songs)	Shin Dong-yup	Hanhae	Nucksal
198	Guess The Debut Song	Hanhae	**Uee**	Nucksal
199	Love Love Couple Quiz	P.O	Hanhae	**Kang Daniel**
200	Sing It Line By Line	A-ing Team (Note: Consists of Oh My Girl (except Jiho and Yubin) with Key and Taeyeon)		Oi Team (Note: Consists of all cast members except Key and Taeyeon)
201	Consonants Quiz (Korean Fried Chicken Brands)	Key	**Jo Bo-ah**	Nucksal
202	Choreography Décalcomanie Quiz	Shin Dong-yup	Hanhae	Nucksal
203	Lyrics Feeling Drama Quiz	Shin Dong-yup	**Ha Do-kwon**	P.O
204	New/Old Neologism Quiz	Hanhae	Kim Dong-hyun	Moon Se-yoon
205	Music Video Scene Quiz	P.O	Hanhae	Kim Dong-hyun
206	I Can See Your Title (Movies)	**Yoo Yeon-seok**	Kim Dong-hyun	Key
207 (Note: For this special episode, two cast members team up and answer as a team, with one answering the singer and the other answering the title of the song. A team must answer correctly twice in order to eat the snack.)	Noraebang Accompaniment Quiz	Hanhae & P.O	Taeyeon (Note: There was only one snack left, so Kim Dong-hyun and Taeyeon must compete individually.)	Kim Dong-hyun
208	Consonants Quiz (Snack Brands)	Hanhae	Park Na-rae	Moon Se-yoon
209	New/Old OST Quiz (Dramas)	**Seolhyun**	Hanhae	**Lee Kwang-soo**
210	Who Are Today's 1st Place Nominees?	Shin Dong-yup	Nucksal	Moon Se-yoon
211	Consonants Quiz (Variety Contents)	Taeyeon	**Joo Woo-jae**	**meenoi**
212	Lyrics in the Square Quiz	Shin Dong-yup	Moon Se-yoon	Nucksal
213	Doppelganger Quiz (Actors/Actresses)	Key	Kim Dong-hyun	Moon Se-yoon
214	Noraebang Accompaniment Quiz	Moon Se-yoon	Taeyeon	Nucksal
215	Lyrics Reading Quiz	**Hyolyn**	Park Na-rae	Kim Dong-hyun
216	Voice Support Quiz (Movies & Dramas)	Nucksal	Hanhae	Park Na-rae
217	Consonants Quiz (Ice Cream Brands)	Nucksal	**Jo Hye-ryun**	Moon Se-yoon
218	Lyrics in the Square Quiz	Moon Se-yoon	Hanhae	Taeyeon
219	Voice Support Quiz (Comedy Famous Lines)	Kim Dong-hyun	**Kim Jun-ho**	Moon Se-yoon
220	Music Video Scene Quiz	Moon Se-yoon	Park Na-rae	Kim Dong-hyun
221	Sub Title Quiz (Songs)	**Chaeryeong**	Moon Se-yoon	Taeyeon
222	New/Old Neologism Quiz	Taeyeon	Shin Dong-yup	Kim Dong-hyun
223 (Note: For this 2-episode Summer Special the snack game is renamed to Hoesik game.) (Note: The Hoesik game was changed to the second one after Nucksal succeeded in getting the foods.)	Director Quiz	**Zico**	Nucksal	Hanhae
223	Noraebang Accompaniment Quiz	Shin Dong-yup	Park Na-rae	Hanhae
224	Director Quiz	**Sunny**	Nucksal	—N/a (Note: The Hoesik foods were given to all cast and guests.)
224	Noraebang Accompaniment Quiz	**Sooyoung**	**Sunny** (Note: Sunny answered the final question to win the prize.)	—N/a
225	Consonants Quiz (Ramyeon Brands)	Shin Dong-yup	Kim Dong-hyun	Moon Se-yoon
226	Lyrics in the Square Quiz	Shin Dong-yup	**An Yu-jin**	Kim Dong-hyun
227	Doppelganger Quiz (Actors/Actresses)	**Park Jin-joo**	Kim Dong-hyun	Hanhae
228	Music Video Scene Quiz	**Lee Eun-ji**	Shin Dong-yup	Kim Dong-hyun
229	Noraebang Accompaniment Quiz	Nucksal	**Jonathan Yiombi**	Park Na-rae
230	I Can See Your Title (Korean Movies)	Nucksal	Kim Dong-hyun	Moon Se-yoon
231	Consonants Quiz (Hamburger)	Shin Dong-yup	Moon Se-yoon	Hanhae
232	Lyrics Feeling Drama Quiz	Shin Dong-yup	Taeyeon	Kim Dong-hyun
233	Guess The First Winning Song	Nucksal	Moon Se-yoon	Park Na-rae
234	New/Old OST Quiz (Dramas)	Hanhae	**Kim Yoo-jung**	Kim Dong-hyun
235	Consonants Quiz (Songs)	Shin Dong-yup	Moon Se-yoon	Kim Dong-hyun
236	Find The Source of This Meme	**Kim Yong-myung**	Kim Dong-hyun	Hanhae
237	Voice Support Quiz (Dramas, Movies)	Shin Dong-yup	**Kim Hye-yoon**	Hanhae
238	Lyrics in the Square Quiz	Nucksal	Park Na-rae	Kim Dong-hyun
239	Find The Original Singer	Shin Dong-yup	Park Na-rae	Nucksal
240	Guess The Alter Ego	**Kim Won-hoon**	Park Na-rae	Kim Dong-hyun
241	New/Old OST Quiz (Dramas, Movies)	Shin Dong-yup	Nucksal	Kim Dong-hyun
242	Lyrics Reading Quiz	**Sunny**	Moon Se-yoon	Hanhae
243	Noraebang Accompaniment Quiz	Moon Se-yoon	**Tei**	Kim Dong-hyun
244 (Note: For this episode, the snack quiz is random and the three teams each have one chance to be able to change the Snack Game in between; the Snack Game changes when a team uses their chance. The team can only get to eat the snack when all of the members have answered correctly. Only the first two teams can get to eat the snack.)	Lyrics in the Square Quiz	**Miyeon**	**Shuhua**	Team Se (Note: As only Kim Dong-hyun failed to answer, his team Team Se did not get to eat the snack.)
244	Consonants Quiz (2000–2022 Songs)	Hanhae	Key	Team Se
244	Choreography Décalcomanie Quiz	Shin Dong-yup	**Minnie**	Team Se
244	Who Are Today's 1st Place Nominees?	Nucksal	**Yuqi**	Team Se
245	Half-half Lyrics Quiz	Moon Se-yoon	Hanhae	**Lee Sang-joon**
246	Consonants Quiz (Ramyeon Brands)	Hanhae	Nucksal	Kim Dong-hyun
247	Lyrics Feeling Drama Quiz	Moon Se-yoon	Kim Dong-hyun	Nucksal
248	Doppelganger Quiz (Actors/Actresses)	Taeyeon	Kim Dong-hyun	Moon Se-yoon
249	New/Old Neologism Quiz	Kim Dong-hyun	Moon Se-yoon	Hanhae
250	I Can See Your Title (Movies)	Shin Dong-yup	Moon Se-yoon	Hanhae
251	Guess Them Right! Homes	**Kim Young-kwang**	Nucksal	Moon Se-yoon
252	Voice Support Quiz (Dramas, Movies)	Moon Se-yoon	Kim Dong-hyun	Shin Dong-yup
253	Lyrics in the Square Quiz	Shin Dong-yup	Taeyeon	Hanhae
254	Music Video Scene Quiz	Shin Dong-yup	**Hwang Kwang-hee**	Nucksal
255	Noraebang Accompaniment Quiz	Hanhae	Shin Dong-yup	Kim Dong-hyun
256	Lyrics in the Square Quiz	Nucksal	Shin Dong-yup	**Code Kunst**
257	Voice Support Quiz (Variety Shows)	Taeyeon	**Heo Young-ji**	Kim Dong-hyun
258	Noraebang Accompaniment Quiz	Moon Se-yoon	Taeyeon	Kim Dong-hyun
259	Consonants Quiz (Songs)	Taeyeon	Kim Dong-hyun	Hanhae
260	Music Video Scene Quiz	Taeyeon	**Chae Jung-an**	Kim Dong-hyun
261 (Note: The snack game was changed to the second one after The8 succeeded in getting the snack.)	Consonants Quiz (Ramyeon Brands)	**Vernon**	**The8**	Nucksal, Hanhae, Taeyeon (Note: Everyone from Team Seventeen has got the snack, hence the remaining members of Team DoReMi did not get the snack.)
261	Lyrics in the Square Quiz	Park Na-rae	Moon Se-yoon (Note: The snack game ends after Team Seventeen's Seungkwan got the snack, but an additional question was given for bonus.)	Nucksal, Hanhae, Taeyeon
262	Lyrics Feeling Drama Quiz	Shin Dong-yup	Park Na-rae	Nucksal
263	Guess The Debut Song	Shin Dong-yup	Kim Dong-hyun	Taeyeon
264	Guess The Debut Act (Dramas)	**Lee Yeon-hee**	Moon Se-yoon	Kim Dong-hyun
265	Consonants Quiz (Ice Cream Brands)	**Miyeon**	Moon Se-yoon	Hanhae
266	I Can See Your Title (Korean Movies & Dramas)	**Lee Joon-hyuk**	**Ko Kyu-pil**	Moon Se-yoon
267	Noraebang Accompaniment Quiz	Taeyeon	Park Na-rae	Kim Dong-hyun
268	Voice Support Quiz (Dramas, Movies)	Shin Dong-yup	Nucksal	**Dahyun**
269	Consonants Quiz (Korean Movies)	**Chun Woo-hee**	**Dahyun**	Kim Dong-hyun
270	Interlude Jump Quiz	**Lee Guk-joo**	Kim Dong-hyun	Nucksal
271	Find The Original Singer	**Lee Guk-joo**	**Kyuhyun**	Nucksal
272 (Note: For this episode, the snack quizzes are New/Old Neologism Quiz and Lyrics in the Square Quiz, but the quiz can be changed at any time by Boom.)	New/Old Neologism Quiz	Taeyeon	Shin Dong-yup	Moon Se-yoon
272	Lyrics in the Square Quiz	Taeyeon	Shin Dong-yup	Moon Se-yoon
273	Guess Them Right! Homes	Kim Dong-hyun	Shin Dong-yup	**Park Jeong-min**
274	Find The Source of This Meme	Key	Kim Dong-hyun	Shin Dong-yup
275	Consonants Quiz (Snack Brands)	**Mimi**	Moon Se-yoon	Kim Dong-hyun
276	Who Are Today's 1st Place Nominees?	Shin Dong-yup	**Bbaek Ga**	Kim Dong-hyun
277	Lyrics in the Square Quiz	**Solar**	Moon Se-yoon	Nucksal
278	Consonants Quiz (Korean Fried Chicken Brands)	**Choiza**	Moon Se-yoon	Kim Dong-hyun
279	Voice Support Quiz (Variety Shows)	Key	**Lee Guk-joo**	Moon Se-yoon
280	Noraebang Accompaniment Quiz	**Jung Dong-won**	**Bbaek Ga**	Kim Dong-hyun
281	I Can See Your Title (Dramas, Movies, Animations)	Nucksal	Moon Se-yoon	Key
282	Doppelganger Quiz (Singers)	**Lee Hong-gi**	Kim Dong-hyun	Moon Se-yoon
283	If It's the End Quiz	Taeyeon	**Eom Ji-yoon**	**Song Hae-na**
284	Lyrics Reading Quiz	**Car, the Garden**	Park Na-rae	Moon Se-yoon
285	Song Abbreviation Quiz	Team Keyeoro (Note: Consists of Kim Dong-hyun, Park Na-rae, Taeyeon and Key)		Team Hero (Note: Consists of Shin Dong-yup, Moon Se-yoon, Hanhae and Lim Young-woong)
285	Continue to Sing Quiz	Team Keyeoro		Team Hero
286	Consonants Quiz (Hamburger)	Hanhae	Nucksal	**Jessi**
287	Music Video Scene Quiz	**Mingyu**	**Dino**	Kim Dong-hyun
288	Doppelganger Quiz (Actors/Actresses)	Shin Dong-yup	Hanhae	Kim Dong-hyun
289	Consonants Quiz (Ramyeon Brands)	Shin Dong-yup	Moon Se-yoon	Park Na-rae
290	Noraebang Accompaniment Quiz	Taeyeon	P.O	Park Na-rae
291	Find The Source of This Meme	P.O	Moon Se-yoon	Shin Dong-yup
292	If It's the End Quiz	P.O	Kim Dong-hyun	Moon Se-yoon
293	I Can See Your Title (Movies & Animations)	Shin Dong-yup	**Lee Kyung-kyu**	**Lee Chang-ho**
294	Find The Source of This Meme	Taeyeon	**U-Know Yunho**	Moon Se-yoon
295	Lyrics in the Square Quiz	Nucksal	Taeyeon	Kim Dong-hyun
296	Who Are Today's 1st Place Nominees?	Taeyeon	Hanhae	Park Na-rae
297	Music Video Scene Quiz	P.O	**Brian Joo**	Kim Dong-hyun
298	Doppelganger Quiz (Actors/Actresses)	P.O	Hanhae	Kim Dong-hyun
299	Voice Support Quiz (Dramas, Movies)	Hanhae	Kim Dong-hyun	Park Na-rae
300	Lyrics in the Square Quiz	Shin Dong-yup	Nucksal	Moon Se-yoon
301	New/Old Neologism Quiz	Shin Dong-yup	**Lee Ho-chul**	Moon Se-yoon
302	Guess Them Right! Homes	Key	Moon Se-yoon	Kim Dong-hyun
303	Lyrics in the Square Quiz	Moon Se-yoon	Hanhae	Kim Dong-hyun
304	Noraebang Accompaniment Quiz	Taeyeon	Shin Dong-yup	Kim Dong-hyun
305	Lyrics Reading Quiz	Park Na-rae	Moon Se-yoon	P.O
306	Consonants Quiz (Ramyeon)	Nucksal	Moon Se-yoon	Kim Dong-hyun
307	Doppelganger Quiz (Actors/Actresses)	Shin Dong-yup	Kim Dong-hyun	P.O
308	If It's the End Quiz	Shin Dong-yup	Hanhae	Kim Dong-hyun
309 (Note: For this episode, there are 5 (6 in Episode 310, since the very last round snack game is changed) snack games that would be played, with the theme "Who is the First AS Treasure?". The first 4 snack games would be played with each of the leaders choosing the other 3 contestants from the other 3 teams. The last places for all 4 snack games would play a final snack game, to decide the eventual final place.)	Facial Recognition Quiz (Actors/Actresses)	**Eunhyuk**	Taeyeon	**Bbaek Ga**
309	MZ Idiom Quiz	**Sakura**	Shin Dong-yup	**Bbaek Ga**
309	Lyrics in the Square Quiz	Hanhae	Park Na-rae	**Bbaek Ga**
309	Dialect Tour	Key	Nucksal	**Bbaek Ga**
309	Consonants Quiz (Singer)	**Haha**	Kim Dong-hyun	**Bbaek Ga**
310	Alien Language Reading Quiz	**Sakura**	Park Na-rae	**Bbaek Ga**
310	Who Are Today's 1st Place Nominees?	Taeyeon	**Eun Ji-won**	**Bbaek Ga**
310	Your Eyes, Nose, Lips Quiz	Nucksal	**Eunhyuk**	**Bbaek Ga**
310	Abbreviation Quiz	**Yeonjun**	**Gabee**	**Bbaek Ga**
310	Facial Recognition Quiz (Singer)	Key	**Kwak Beom**	**Bbaek Ga**
310	If It's the End Quiz	Kim Dong-hyun		**Bbaek Ga**
311	Voice Support Quiz (Variety Shows)	Nucksal	Hanhae	Kim Dong-hyun
312	Alien Language Reading Quiz	Shin Dong-yup	Moon Se-yoon	Nucksal
313	Music Video Scene Quiz	Moon Se-yoon	Nucksal	P.O
314	I Can See Your Title (Musical & Musical Movies)	Park Na-rae	Kim Dong-hyun	Hanhae
315	What's Your Name? (Manhwa & Animation Characters)	P.O	**Giselle**	Taeyeon
316	I Can See Your Title (Webtoons & Webnovels)	Nucksal	P.O	Hanhae
317	Omniscient Dialogue's Viewpoint	Shin Dong-yup	Key	**Song Seung-heon**
317	Director Quiz	Moon Se-yoon	Taeyeon	**Song Seung-heon**
317	Noraebang Accompaniment Quiz	**Oh Yeon-seo**	**Lee Si-eon**	**Song Seung-heon**
318	What's Your Name? (Things)	Shin Dong-yup	Kim Dong-hyun	Hanhae
319	Who Are Your Parents?	**Sunmi**	Key	P.O
320	What's Your Name? (Generation Connecting Things)	Hanhae	Park Na-rae	Moon Se-yoon
321	Why Are You Coming Out From There?	**Gong Seung-yeon**	Park Na-rae	Kim Dong-hyun
322	Omniscient Dialogue View	**Nam Ji-hyun**	Kim Dong-hyun	Moon Se-yoon
323	How Much Do You Like Mukbang	P.O	Shin Dong-yup	Moon Se-yoon
324	A Ghost Appeared!	Shin Dong-yup	Moon Se-yoon	Kim Dong-hyun
325	What's Your Name? (Nostalgic Snacks)	Moon Se-yoon	Taeyeon	Kim Dong-hyun
325	Voice Support Quiz (Dramas, Movies)	P.O	Hanhae	Kim Dong-hyun
325	If It's the End Quiz	Park Na-rae	Shin Dong-yup	Kim Dong-hyun
326	New/Old Neologism Quiz	Shin Dong-yup	Moon Se-yoon	Kim Dong-hyun
327	Fashion King on Stage	**Miyeon**	Moon Se-yoon	Hanhae
328	Mom's Friend's Son & Mom's Friend's Daughter	**Kim Ji-eun**	Moon Se-yoon	Taeyeon
329	Omniscient Dialogue View	**Go Min-si**	Hanhae	Moon Se-yoon
330	Lyrics in the Square Quiz	Park Na-rae	**Park Yong-in**	Moon Se-yoon
331	Today's Workout Scene Quiz	Key	Moon Se-yoon	Kim Dong-hyun
332	What's Your Name? (Domestic Characters)	**YooA**	Taeyeon	Kim Dong-hyun
333	Guess It Right Crime Scene	P.O	Kim Dong-hyun	Hanhae
334	Who Are Your Parents?	Nucksal	Moon Se-yoon	**Kim Hae-jun**
335	Noraebang Accompaniment Quiz	Shin Dong-yup	Moon Se-yoon	Hanhae
336	You're A Big Villain	Key	Moon Se-yoon	Nucksal
337	Consonants Quiz (Ramyeon)	Nucksal	**Bbaek Ga**	Moon Se-yoon
338	Find The Source of This Meme	Key	Moon Se-yoon	Kim Dong-hyun
339	What's Your Name? (Things)	**Seunghee**	Moon Se-yoon	Hanhae
340	Fashion King on Stage	Taeyeon	Nucksal	P.O
341	New/Old Neologism Quiz	Shin Dong-yup	Moon Se-yoon	Kim Dong-hyun
342	Today's Workout Scene Quiz	Shin Dong-yup	Kim Dong-hyun	Park Na-rae
343	Omniscient Dialogue View	Nucksal	Moon Se-yoon	**Go Soo**
344	Lightstick? Guess It Stick!	**Jihyo**	Hanhae	**Dahyun**
345	What's Your Name? (Nostalgic Snacks)	**Lee Yoo-young**	**Oh Dae-hwan**	Taeyeon
346	Consonants Quiz (Hamburger)	**Yoo Seon-ho**	Moon Se-yoon	Kim Dong-hyun
347	Lyrics in the Square Quiz	Nucksal	Kim Dong-hyun	Moon Se-yoon
348	Today's Workout Scene Quiz	P.O	Kim Dong-hyun, **Mo Tae-bum**	Nucksal
349	Alien Language Reading Quiz	Shin Dong-yup	Kim Dong-hyun	Nucksal
350	What's Your Name? (Domestic Characters)	Key	Nucksal	Taeyeon
351	Omniscient Dialogue View	Key	Hanhae	Kim Dong-hyun
352	Consonants Quiz (Korean Fried Chicken Brands)	Key	Nucksal	Moon Se-yoon
353	What's Your Name? (Generation Connecting Things)	Key	Nucksal	Moon Se-yoon
354	Voice Support Quiz (Dramas, Movies)	Shin Dong-yup	**Kim Ah-young**	Moon Se-yoon
355	Omniscient Dialogue View	P.O	Key	Taeyeon
356	Fashion King on Stage	Shin Dong-yup	Kim Dong-hyun	Moon Se-yoon
357	Omniscient Ment View	Key	Kim Dong-hyun	**Jang Young-ran**
358	Consonants Quiz (Snack Brands)	**Yoon Chan-young**	Moon Se-yoon	**Park Byung-eun**
359	What's Your Name? (Compilation)	P.O	**Lee Da-hee**	Hanhae
360	Oh~ Yeah~ Na~ Quiz	Shin Dong-yup	**Lee Yong-jin**	**Bbaek Ga**
361	Interlude Jump Quiz	Park Na-rae	Taeyeon	Nucksal
362	New/Old Neologism Quiz	Key	**Kwon Eun-bi**	**Lee Hyun-woo**
363	Consonants Quiz (Songs)	**Seohyun**	Hanhae	Kim Dong-hyun
364	Noraebang Accompaniment Quiz	Kim Dong-hyun	Taeyeon	P.O
365	How Much Do You Like Mukbang	**Kim Shin-rok**	P.O	Moon Se-yoon
366	Dialect Tour	**Car, the Garden**	Kim Dong-hyun	Hanhae
367	I Can See Your Title (Korean Movies & Dramas)	**Sooyoung**	Hanhae	Kim Dong-hyun
368	What's Your Name? (Domestic Characters)	Moon Se-yoon	Shin Dong-yup	Kim Dong-hyun
369	Big Appearance Quiz	Key	**Chung Seung-je**	Moon Se-yoon
370	Oh~ Yeah~ Na~ La~ Quiz	**Shin Jae-pyung**	Kim Dong-hyun	Nucksal
371	Omniscient Dialogue View	Key	Shin Dong-yup	Kim Dong-hyun
372	Doppelganger Quiz (Actors/Actresses)	Shin Dong-yup	Moon Se-yoon	Kim Dong-hyun
373	Lyrics in the Square Quiz	**Winter**	Taeyeon	Kim Dong-hyun
374	Hey A.I. Draw A Picture~	P.O	**Kim Ji-hoon**	Kim Dong-hyun
375	Consonants Quiz (Ice Cream Brands)	**Shin Seung-ho**	**Ahn Hyo-seop**	Moon Se-yoon
376	The Star's Childhood	P.O	Kim Dong-hyun	Shin Dong-yup
377	Abbreviation Quiz (Webtoons & Webnovels)	Hanhae	**Ahn Bo-hyun**	Moon Se-yoon
378	Big Appearance Quiz	Hanhae	Moon Se-yoon	Shin Dong-yup
379	Music Video Scene Quiz	P.O	Nucksal	Kim Dong-hyun
380	Hey A.I. Draw A Picture~	Hanhae	Moon Se-yoon	Kim Dong-hyun
381	Consonants Quiz (Korean Fried Chicken Brands)	Taeyeon	**Han Yu-jin**	Park Na-rae
382	Oh~ Yeah~ Na~ Baby~ Quiz	Taeyeon	Moon Se-yoon	P.O
383	Dialogue in the Square Quiz (Dramas, Movies)	Key	**Kim Jong-min**	Moon Se-yoon
384	Consonants Quiz (Ramyeon)	Key	**Park Ji-hwan**	Kim Dong-hyun
385	The Star's Childhood	Taeyeon	Shin Dong-yup	Kim Dong-hyun
386	Your Eyes, Nose, Lips Quiz	Key	**O3ohn**	Nucksal
387	Noraebang Accompaniment Quiz	Taeyeon	Kim Dong-hyun	Nucksal
388	Consonants Quiz (Snack Brands)	Hanhae	Shin Dong-yup	Moon Se-yoon
389	Hey A.I. Draw A Picture~	Park Na-rae	Moon Se-yoon	P.O
390	The Star's Childhood	Nucksal	Shin Dong-yup	**Kwak Beom**
391	New/Old Neologism Quiz	Taeyeon	**Shin Gi-ru**	**Heo Kyung-hwan**
392	Oh~ Woo~ Yeah~ Baby~ Quiz	Park Na-rae	Kim Dong-hyun	**K.Will**
393	Lyrics in the Square Quiz	Nucksal	Kim Dong-hyun	Shin Dong-yup
394	Doppelganger Quiz (Variety Shows)	Shin Dong-yup	Kim Dong-hyun	Moon Se-yoon
395	Dialogue in the Square Quiz (Dramas, Movies)	Shin Dong-yup	Hanhae	Kim Dong-hyun
396	If It's the End Quiz	P.O	**Roy Kim**	Nucksal
397	Consonants Quiz (Hamburger)	**Kim Min-seok**	Moon Se-yoon	P.O
398	Fashion King on Stage	Kim Dong-hyun	Taeyeon	P.O
399	Hey A.I. Draw A Picture~	**Kim Ddol-ddol**	P.O	Nucksal
400	Lyrics in the Square Quiz	P.O	Moon Se-yoon	Hanhae
401 (Note: For this episode, the snack quizzes are Consonants Quiz (Songs) & Who Is Today's Ending Fairy?, but the quiz can be changed at any time by Boom.)	Consonants Quiz (Songs)	**Geonwoo**	**Leo**	P.O
401	Who Is Today's Ending Fairy?	**Sangwon**	Kim Dong-hyun	P.O
402	The Star's Childhood	Moon Se-yoon	Shin Dong-yup	Kim Dong-hyun
403	New/Old Neologism Quiz	Taeyeon	Nucksal	**Hwang Je-sung**
404	Lyrics Feeling Drama Quiz	Taeyeon	**Ko Kyung-pyo**	P.O
405	Interlude Jump Quiz	Shin Dong-yup	Hanhae	Moon Se-yoon
406	Consonants Quiz (Drinks Brands)	Nucksal	**Lee Jae-youl**	**Lee Yong-jin**
407	Oh~ Woo~ Yeah~ Na~ Quiz	**Woodz**	Young K	Shin Dong-yup
408	Lyrics in the Square Quiz	**Jeno**	Moon Se-yoon	Young K
409	Music Video Scene Quiz	**Choi Ye-na**	Shin Dong-yup	Kim Dong-hyun
410	Hey A.I. Draw A Picture~	Taeyeon	Shin Dong-yup	Moon Se-yoon
411	Noraebang Accompaniment Quiz	P.O	Kim Dong-hyun	Nucksal
412	Consonants Quiz (Ramyeon)	P.O	Nucksal	Kim Dong-hyun
413	Guess It Guess It! Friends	Hanhae	Kim Dong-hyun	Moon Se-yoon
414	Consonants Quiz (Songs)	Young K	Taeyeon	P.O
415	The Star's Childhood	**Kangnam**	Hanhae	Kim Dong-hyun
416	Voice Support Quiz (Dramas, Movies)	**Kim Hae-jun**	Kim Dong-hyun	**Yang Sang-guk**
417	Consonants Quiz (Snack Brands)	Kim Dong-hyun	Young K	Moon Se-yoon
418	Guess The Debut Song	Nucksal	Kim Dong-hyun	Young K
419	Lyrics in the Square Quiz	Nucksal	Hanhae	P.O
420	Song Narration Quiz	Nucksal	Shin Dong-yup	Hanhae
421	Lyrics Feeling Drama Quiz	Shin Dong-yup	Taeyeon	**Kim Ji-seok**
422	Dialect Tour	Taeyeon	P.O	Shin Dong-yup
423	Doppelganger Quiz (Actors/Actresses)	**Kang Mi-na**	Kim Dong-hyun	Young K
424	The Star's Childhood	Nucksal	**Yoo Ho-suk**	Kim Dong-hyun
425	A Ghost Appeared!	**Park Eun-bin**	Hanhae	Kim Dong-hyun
426	Hey A.I. Draw A Picture~	**Leo**	P.O	Nucksal
427	What's Your Name? (Objects)	Hanhae	Moon Se-yoon	Kim Dong-hyun
428	Guess It Right Love Scene	**Ha Young**	Shin Dong-yup	Kim Dong-hyun
429	Guess It Right Crime Scene	Taeyeon	**Park Sung-woong**	Hanhae
430	Fashion King on Stage	Taeyeon	**Zena**	Kim Dong-hyun
431	Consonants Quiz (Ice Cream Brands)	**Xinlong**	Kim Dong-hyun	Moon Se-yoon
432	Dialogue in the Square Quiz (Dramas, Movies)	P.O	Hanhae	Nucksal
433	The Star's Childhood	Taeyeon	Young K	Kim Dong-hyun
434	If It's the End Quiz	Nucksal	Hanhae	Zo Zazz
435	Music Video Scene Quiz	Hanhae	Moon Se-yoon	Kim Dong-hyun
436	Consonants Quiz (Korean Fried Chicken Brands)	Nucksal	**Kim Ji-yu**	Taeyeon
437	Lyrics in the Square Quiz	Young K	Hanhae	Taeyeon
438	Dialogue in the Square Quiz	Young K	Moon Se-yoon	**Park Joon-hyung**
439	Choreography Décalcomanie Quiz	**Ingyoo**	Shin Dong-yup	P.O
440	Oh~ Yeah~ Na~ Come On! Quiz	**Yunah**	Taeyeon	Young K
441	Omniscient Dialogue View (Dramas and Movies)	Hanhae	Taeyeon	Kim Dong-hyun
442	Abbreviation Quiz (Webtoons & Webnovels)	P.O	Moon Se-yoon	Taeyeon
443	Consonants Quiz (Drinks Brands)	Nucksal	**Kwak Sun-young**	Taeyeon

== Appetizer Round ==
The team assignments and results for the games from the Appetizer round are as listed:

Winning team
Losing team

Appetizer Round

Episode	Game	Teams		Scores
382	English Speed Quiz (Variety Shows)	Team Day6 (Day6, Key, Hanhae)	Team AS6 (Note: AS is Amazing Saturday in short) (Shin Dong-yup, Kim Dong-hyun, Moon Se-yoon, Park Na-rae, Nucksal, Taeyeon, P.O)	2–1
383	Continue to Sing Quiz	Team Koyote (Koyote, Taeyeon, Key, P.O)	Team Nolyote (Shin Dong-yup, Kim Dong-hyun, Moon Se-yoon, Park Na-rae, Nucksal, Hanhae)	1–2
384	Omniscient Dialogue View - Six United as One	Team Boss (Jo Woo-jin, Park Ji-hwan, Lee Kyu-hyung, Taeyeon, Key, P.O)	Team Minnows (Shin Dong-yup, Kim Dong-hyun, Moon Se-yoon, Park Na-rae, Nucksal, Hanhae)	3–4 (Note: The outcome of the game was reversed because Team Minnows was caught discussing the answer, when it was agreed that any answer discussion during the final round would result in a loss.)
385	Guess Them Right! AS Restaurant	Team Kind (Jeon Yeo-been, Jung Jin-young, Joo Hyun-young, Park Na-rae, Taeyeon, P.O)	Team Bad (Shin Dong-yup, Kim Dong-hyun, Moon Se-yoon, Nucksal, Hanhae, Key)	33–27
386	Charades (Famous Drama Lines)	Team Autumn Boy (Lee Sang-jun, Zo Zazz, O3ohn, Kim Dong-hyun, Moon Se-yoon, Nucksal)	Team Beauty Boy (Shin Dong-yup, Park Na-rae, Taeyeon, Hanhae, Key, P.O)	1–2
387	Omniscient Dialogue View - Six United as One (Variety Program)	Team Death (Kim Sung-kyu, Sandeul, Kim Min-seok, Kim Dong-hyun, Hanhae, P.O)	Team Yes (Shin Dong-yup, Moon Se-yoon, Park Na-rae, Nucksal, Taeyeon, Key)	3–4
388	Charades (Song Lyrics)	Team Avocado (Myung Jae-hyun, Wonhee, Shin Dong-yup, Kim Dong-hyun, Moon Se-yoon, Taeyeon, P.O)	Team Heartzna (Bang Jee-min, Ian, Park Na-rae, Nucksal, Hanhae, Key)	1–2
389	Lyrics Reading Quiz - Six United as One	Team MZ (Baekho, Lee Chan-won, Hwang Yun-seong, Shin Dong-yup, Kim Dong-hyun, Hanhae)	Team NZ (Moon Se-yoon, Park Na-rae, Nucksal, Taeyeon, Key, P.O)	4–3
390	English Speed Quiz (Proverb)	Team Hyukie (Jung Hyuk, Park Na-rae, Taeyeon, Hanhae, Key, P.O)	Team Beomie (Kwak Beom, Park Joon-hyung, Shin Dong-yup, Kim Dong-hyun, Moon Se-yoon, Nucksal)	2–1
391	Voice Support Quiz - Six United as One	Team Balance (Seo Bum-june, Nucksal, Taeyeon, Hanhae, Key, P.O)	Team Unbalance (Heo Kyung-hwan, Shin Gi-ru, Shin Dong-yup, Kim Dong-hyun, Moon Se-yoon, Park Na-rae)	5–4
392	Continue to Sing Quiz	Team Eardrum (K.Will, Choi Jung-hoon, Moon Se-yoon, Park Na-rae, Nucksal, P.O)	Team Cockles (Jung Seung-hwan, Shin Dong-yup, Kim Dong-hyun, Taeyeon, Hanhae, Key)	2–1
393	I Can See Your Title (Korean Movies & Dramas) - Six United as One	Team Musical (Yoo Jun-sang, Shin Dong-yup, Nucksal, Taeyeon, Hanhae, P.O)	Team Physical (Kim Dong-hyun, Lee Hong-gi, Small-mouthed Haetnim, Moon Se-yoon, Park Na-rae, Key)	3–5
394	Charades (Famous Drama Lines)	Team Heo's Family (Heo Sung-tae, Shin Dong-yup, Kim Dong-hyun, Moon Se-yoon, Park Na-rae, Taeyeon)	Team Kwak's Family (Kwaktube, Nucksal, Hanhae, Key, P.O)	2–1
395	Continue to Sing Quiz	Team Bibo (Song Eun-i, Shin Dong-yup, Moon Se-yoon, Park Na-rae, Key)	Team Babo (Shin Bong-sun, Kim Dong-hyun, Nucksal, Taeyeon, Hanhae, P.O)	2–1
396	Omniscient Dialogue View - Six United as One (Variety Program)	Team Dae (Daesung, Shin Dong-yup, Taeyeon, Hanhae, Key, P.O)	Team Kwang (Seo Eun-kwang, Roy Kim, Kim Dong-hyun, Moon Se-yoon, Park Na-rae, Nucksal)	4–2
397	Charades (Movies & Dramas Title)	Team Typhoon (Kim Min-seok, Lee Sang-jin, Kim Dong-hyun, Park Na-rae, Key, P.O)	Team Tyrant (Lee Joo-ahn, Yoon Seo-ah, Shin Dong-yup, Moon Se-yoon, Nucksal, Taeyeon, Hanhae)	2–1
398	Charades (Song Title)	Team Dad (Shin Dong-yup, Dayoung, Chuu, Taeyeon, P.O)	Team Uncle (Hanhae, Lee Chae-yeon, Kim Dong-hyun, Moon Se-yoon, Nucksal)	2–1
399	New/Old OST Quiz (Dramas, Movies) - Five United as One	Team Hong (Hong Seok-cheon, Small-mouthed Haetnim, Kim Dong-hyun, Moon Se-yoon, P.O)	Team Ddol (Kim Ddol-ddol, Shin Dong-yup, Nucksal, Taeyeon, Hanhae)	4–5
400	Continue to Sing Quiz	Team Heo Heo (Heo Kyung-hwan, Hyoyeon, Rei, Moon Se-yoon, P.O)	Team Hee Hee (Wonhee, Shin Dong-yup, Kim Dong-hyun, Nucksal, Taeyeon, Hanhae)	0–2
402	Continue to Sing Quiz	Team Exo (Suho, Shin Dong-yup, Moon Se-yoon, Taeyeon, Hanhae)	Team Right So (Nucksal, Chanyeol, Kim Dong-hyun, P.O)	1–2
403	What's Your Name? (Nostalgic Snacks) - Five United as One	Team Brainical (Orbit, Shin Dong-yup, Moon Se-yoon, Taeyeon, P.O)	Team Physical (Kim Dong-hyun, Hwang Je-sung, Lee Hye-sung, Nucksal, Hanhae)	5–2
404	Omniscient Dialogue View - Five United as One	Team KoKo (Ko Kyung-pyo, Park Shin-hye, Ha Yoon-kyung, Kim Dong-hyun, Nucksal)	Team TaengTaeng (Taeyeon, Shin Dong-yup, Moon Se-yoon, Hanhae, P.O)	5–2
405	English Speed Quiz (Catchphrase)	Team Pink (Park Cho-rong, Yoon Bo-mi, Shin Dong-yup, Kim Dong-hyun, Taeyeon)	Team Punk (Moon Se-yoon, Jung Eun-ji, Nucksal, Hanhae, P.O)	2–1
406	Charades (Movie Title)	Team Jorong (Lee Yong-jin, Kim Dong-hyun, Moon Se-yoon, Hanhae, Taeyeon)	Team Merong (P.O, Shin Gi-ru, Lee Jae-youl, Shin Dong-yup, Nucksal)	2–1
407	Continue to Sing Quiz	Team Young (Young K, Woodz, Taeyeon, Hanhae, P.O)	Team Old (Shin Dong-yup, Zo Zazz, Kim Dong-hyun, Moon Se-yoon, Nucksal)	2–1
408	Charades (Drama Title)	Team JeJae (Jeno, Jaemin, Shin Dong-yup, Hanhae, P.O, Young K)	Team Jjyasseu (Im Woo-il, Kim Ji-yu, Kim Dong-hyun, Moon Se-yoon, Nucksal, Taeyeon)	1–2
409	Continue to Sing Quiz	Team Big Sister (Lee Chae-yeon, Moon Se-yoon, Nucksal, Taeyeon, Choi Ye-na)	Team Little Sister (Chaeryeong, Shin Dong-yup, Kim Dong-hyun, Hanhae, P.O, Young K)	1–2
410	Continue to Sing Quiz	Team Tubatu (Yeonjun, Shin Dong-yup, Moon Se-yoon, Taeyeon, Hanhae)	Team Tubabo (Kim Dong-hyun, Nucksal, P.O, Soobin, Beomgyu)	2–1
412	Omniscient Dialogue View - Five United as One	Team YeonieYeonie~ (Hyoyeon, Taeyeon, Kim Dong-hyun, Nucksal, Hanhae)	Team YoonieYoonie~ (Kim Hye-yoon, Moon Se-yoon, Shin Dong-yup, P.O, Kim Jun-han)	5–2
413	Continue to Sing Quiz	Team Gugi-dong (Jang Keun-suk, Taeyeon, Hanhae, P.O, Young K, Kyung Soo-jin)	Team Sangam-dong (Moon Se-yoon, Shin Dong-yup, Kim Dong-hyun, Nucksal, Choi Daniel, Ahn Jae-hyun)	2–0
414	If It's the End Quiz - Five United as One	Team YeonieYeonie~ (Taeyeon, Nucksal, P O, Young K, Dohoon, Sion)	Team YupieYupie~ (Shin Dong-yup, Kim Dong-hyun, Moon Se-yoon, Hanhae, Kyehoon, Kya)	4–3
415	Continue to Sing Quiz	Team Language School (Kangnam, Shin Dong-yup, Moon Se-yoon, Nucksal, Taeyeon, Wonhee)	Team Difficult (Kim Dong-hyun, Hanhae, P.O, Jonathan Yiombi, Lily)	2–0
416	Relay Dictation	Team Romance (Kim Hae-jun, Kim Dong-hyun, Hanhae, P.O, Na Bo-ram)	Team Pushover (Yang Sang-guk, Shin Dong-yup, Moon Se-yoon, Nucksal, Taeyeon)	4–4
417	Noraebang Accompaniment Quiz - Six United as One	Team Mixx (Haewon, Bae, Nucksal, Taeyeon, P.O, Young K)	Team Rafim (Kim Chae-won, Kazuha, Shin Dong-yup, Kim Dong-hyun, Moon Se-yoon, Hanhae)	5–4
418	Continue to Sing Quiz	Team Kid (Kim Se-jeong, Kim Dong-hyun, Moon Se-yoon, Nucksal, Taeyeon, Kim So-hye)	Team Adult (Shin Dong-yup, Hanhae, P.O, Young K, Jeon Somi)	0–2
419	Omniscient Dialogue View - Five United as One	Team Strange (Ra Mi-ran, Shin Dong-yup, Moon Se-yoon, Taeyeon, Young K)	Team Spoiled (Nucksal, Kim Dong-hyun, Hanhae, P.O, Lee Re)	5–0
420	Continue to Sing Quiz	Team Gym Boy (Rhymer, Kim Dong-hyun, Moon Se-yoon, Taeyeon, Dayoung)	Team Gym Girl (Jo Hye-ryun, Shin Dong-yup, Nucksal, Hanhae, P.O)	2–1
421	I Can See Your Title (Movies & Dramas) - Six United as One	Team Husband (Kim Ji-seok, Gong Myung, Shin Dong-yup, Moon Se-yoon, Hanhae, P.O)	Team Wife (Lee Da-hee, Kang Han-na, Kim Dong-hyun, Nucksal, Taeyeon, Young K)	4–3
422	Charades (Song Title)	Team Boy (Sungho, Woonhak, Shin Dong-yup, Hanhae, P.O, Young K)	Team Rii (Sungchan, Wonbin, Kim Dong-hyun, Moon Se-yoon, Nucksal, Taeyeon)	2–3
423	Oh~ Woo~ Yeah~ Na~ Quiz - Five United as One	Team Go to Work (Seo In-guk, Shin Dong-yup, Moon Se-yoon, Taeyeon, Hanhae)	Team Shabby (Nucksal, Kim Dong-hyun, P.O, Young K, Kang Mi-na)	5–4
424	Charades (Variety & Culture Program)	Team Click (Oh Jong-hyuk, Shin Dong-yup, Moon Se-yoon, Taeyeon, P.O, Yoo Ho-suk)	Team B (Kim Sang-hyuk, Kim Dong-hyun, Nucksal, Hanhae, Young K)	0–2
425	Continue to Sing Quiz	Team Spooky (Park Eun-bin, Kim Dong-hyun, Taeyeon, Hanhae, P.O, Young K)	Team Wiggle (Nucksal, Shin Dong-yup, Moon Se-yoon, Yang Se-jong, Ong Seong-wu)	2–0
426	Charades (Movie, Drama & Musical)	Team Sunmi (Sunmi, Kim Dong-hyun, Moon Se-yoon, Nucksal, P.O, Young K)	Team Yumi (Tiffany Young, Shin Dong-yup, Taeyeon, Hanhae, Leo)	2–1
427	Pictionary (Song Title)	Team Bias (Kang Hoon, Shin Dong-yup, Moon Se-yoon, Nucksal, Taeyeon, Hanhae)	Team Baby (Kim Dong-hyun, P.O, Young K, Kim Hye-jun, Kim Ah-young)	0–2
428	Tell Me Line by Line Tell Me (Movie & Drama)	Team This (Jung Hae-in, Shin Dong-yup, Kim Dong-hyun, Nucksal, Hanhae, Ha Young)	Team That (Heo Sung-tae, Moon Se-yoon, Taeyeon, P.O, Young K)	5–0
429	I'm a Person Like This! Quiz	Uhm Jung-hwa: Shin Dong-yup, Nucksal; Park Sung-woong: Moon Se-yoon, Taeyeon, Young K, Uhm Jung-hwa; Ryeoun: Hanhae	Kim Dong-hyun, Park Sung-woong, Ryeoun	—N/a
430	I'm a Person Like This! Quiz	Woni: Kim Dong-hyun, Nucksal; Liv: Taeyeon, Hanhae, Young K, Zena; Zena: Liv	Shin Dong-yup, Moon Se-yoon, Woni	—N/a
431	Pictionary (Book Title)	Team Yellow (Shin Dong-yup, Moon Se-yoon, Nucksal, Hanhae, Young K, Xinlong)	Team Blue (Kim Dong-hyun, Taeyeon, P.O, Leo, Sangwon)	2–1
432	I'm a Person Like This! Quiz	Hong Jin-ho: Taeyeon, P.O; Mimi: Nucksal, Hanhae	Shin Dong-yup, Kim Dong-hyun, Moon Se-yoon, Young K, Hong Jin-ho, Mimi	—N/a
433	I'm a Person Like This! Quiz	Ryu Seung-ryong: Shin Dong-yup, Kim Dong-hyun; Kim Si-a: Young K, Ryu Seung-ryong	Moon Se-yoon, Nucksal, Taeyeon, Hanhae, P.O, Kim Si-a	—N/a
434	I'm a Person Like This! Quiz	Wonpil: Young K, Taeyeon; Zo Zazz: P.O, Kim Kyu-won; Kim Kyu-won: Kim Dong-hyun, Nucksal	Shin Dong-yup, Moon Se-yoon, Hanhae, Wonpil, Zo Zazz	—N/a
435	Continue to Sing Quiz	Team Yellow (Shin Dong-yup, Kim Dong-hyun, Nucksal, Hanhae, Young K, Seo Eun-kwang)	Team Blue (Moon Se-yoon, Moon Se-yoon, Taeyeon, P.O, Young Tak, Lee Seok-hoon)	1–2
436	Omniscient Dialogue View - Five United as One	Team Yellow (Shin Dong-yup, Moon Se-yoon, Nucksal, P.O, Young K)	Team Blue (Kim Dong-hyun, Taeyeon, Hanhae, Shin Gi-ru, Kim Ji-yu)	3–4
437	Charades (Song Title)	OldDay Project (Shin Dong-yup, Kim Dong-hyun, Moon Se-yoon, Taeyeon, P.O, Young K)	YoungDay Project (AllDay Project, Nucksal, Hanhae)	2–1
438	Continue to Sing Quiz	Team Yellow (Shin Dong-yup, Kim Dong-hyun, Taeyeon, P.O, Park Joon-hyung, Tsuki)	Team Blue (Moon Se-yoon, Nucksal, Hanhae, Young K, Brian Joo)	1–2
439	Charades (Variety & Culture Program)	Team Yellow (Shin Dong-yup, Moon Se-yoon, Hanhae, P.O, Bada Lee, Ingyoo)	Team Blue (Kim Dong-hyun, Nucksal, Taeyeon, Young K, Simeez)	2–1
440	What's Your Name? (Snacks) - Six United as One	Team Yellow (Taeyeon, Hanhae, P.O, Young K, Yunah, Wonhee)	Team Blue (Shin Dong-yup, Kim Dong-hyun, Moon Se-yoon, Nucksal, Lily, Sullyoon)	4–3
441	Continue to Sing Quiz	Team Yellow (Kim Dong-hyun, Moon Se-yoon, Taeyeon, Hanhae, P.O, Kim Eung-soo)	Team Blue (Shin Dong-yup, Nucksal, Young K, Swings, Chuu)	2–0
442	Continue to Sing Quiz	Team Yellow (Shin Dong-yup, Kim Dong-hyun, Nucksal, Young K, Kyuhyun, Orbit)	Team Blue (Moon Se-yoon, Taeyeon, Hanhae, P.O, Mimiminu)	2–0
443	Tell Me Line by Line Tell Me (Movie & Drama)	Team Yellow (Kim Dong-hyun, Taeyeon, Hanhae, P.O, Kwak Sun-young)	Team Blue (Shin Dong-yup, Moon Se-yoon, Nucksal, Young K, Lee Min-ki)	5–4

== Ratings ==
In the ratings below, for each year, the highest rating for the show will be in red and the lowest rating for the show will be in blue.

=== 2018 ===
List of ratings in 2018 (episode 1–39)

Episode	Date	AGB Nielsen	
Episode	Date	Nationwide	Seoul Capital Area
1	April 7	2.132%	2.787%
2	April 14	2.066%	2.386%
3	April 21	1.356%	1.430%
4	April 28	1.329%	NR
5	May 5	1.540%	1.590%
6	May 12	1.744%	1.634%
7	May 19	1.359%	1.728%
8	May 26	2.036%	2.331%
9	June 2	1.249%	NR
10	June 9	1.416%	NR
11	June 16	1.709%	1.938%
12	June 23	2.271%	2.651%
13	June 30	1.447%	NR
14	July 7	1.822%	1.955%
15	July 14	1.717%	1.756%
16	July 21	1.709%	NR
17	July 28	1.973%	2.362%
18	August 4	2.112%	2.617%
19	August 11	1.837%	2.363%
20	August 18	2.458%	2.871%
21	August 25	2.374%	2.870%
22	September 1	1.776%	1.900%
23	September 8	2.325%	2.367%
24	September 15	2.374%	2.701%
25	September 22	2.757%	2.848%
26	September 29	2.844%	3.359%
27	October 6	2.679%	3.316%
28	October 13	2.207%	2.147%
29	October 20	2.555%	3.017%
30	October 27	2.756%	3.449%
31	November 3	2.475%	2.775%
32	November 10	2.723%	3.459%
33	November 17	2.420%	2.799%
34	November 24	2.206%	2.294%
35	December 1	2.700%	3.062%
36	December 8	2.568%	2.840%
37	December 15	2.609%	2.846%
38	December 22	2.227%	2.383%
39	December 29	3.696%	4.469%

=== 2019 ===
List of ratings in 2019 (episode 40–89 + two special episodes)

Episode	Date	AGB Nielsen	
Episode	Date	Nationwide	Seoul Capital Area
40	January 5	2.790%	2.900%
41	January 12	2.915%	3.253%
42	January 19	2.797%	3.261%
43	January 26	3.062%	3.639%
44	February 2	2.870%	2.950%
45	February 9	3.788%	4.264%
46	February 16	3.061%	3.557%
47	February 23	2.630%	2.951%
48	March 2	2.821%	2.983%
49	March 9	2.291%	2.615%
50	March 16	2.752%	3.065%
51	March 23	3.435%	4.045%
52	March 30	3.340%	3.931%
53	April 6	2.769%	3.146%
54	April 13	3.115%	3.532%
55	April 20	2.594%	3.046%
56	April 27	3.204%	3.519%
57	May 4	2.697%	2.714%
58	May 11	3.368%	4.079%
59	May 18	3.423%	4.569%
60	May 25	2.883%	3.446%
61	June 1	2.171%	2.454%
62	June 8	2.960%	3.538%
63	June 15	2.686%	2.940%
64	June 22	3.031%	3.377%
65	June 29	3.167%	3.965%
66	July 6	3.048%	3.583%
67	July 13	3.432%	3.542%
68	July 20	3.403%	3.571%
69	July 27	3.113%	3.179%
70	August 3	3.038%	3.689%
71	August 10	3.764%	4.092%
72	August 17	3.114%	3.370%
73	August 24	3.152%	3.659%
74	August 31	2.996%	3.021%
75	September 7	3.593%	4.217%
Special 1	September 14	2.307%	2.083%
76	September 21	2.920%	2.980%
77	September 28	3.445%	3.999%
78	October 5	3.002%	3.202%
79	October 12	2.907%	3.426%
80	October 19	3.229%	3.882%
81	October 26	2.516%	2.648%
82	November 2	2.654%	3.215%
Special 2	November 9	1.462%	1.355%
83	November 16	2.709%	3.082%
84	November 23	2.534%	2.548%
85	November 30	2.998%	3.399%
86	December 7	3.154%	3.373%
87	December 14	3.224%	3.520%
88	December 21	2.747%	3.232%
89	December 28	3.751%	3.868%

=== 2020 ===
List of ratings in 2020 (episode 90–140 + two special episodes)

Episode	Date	AGB Nielsen	
Episode	Date	Nationwide	Seoul Capital Area
90	January 4	3.179%	3.950%
91	January 11	3.232%	3.863%
92	January 18	3.259%	3.840%
93	January 25	2.084%	1.873%
94	February 1	3.378%	3.823%
95	February 8	3.170%	3.615%
96	February 15	3.502%	4.239%
97	February 22	2.981%	NR
Special 3	February 26	NR	NR
98	February 29	3.176%	3.704%
99	March 7	3.559%	4.202%
100	March 14	2.711%	3.083%
101	March 21	3.138%	3.757%
102	March 28	3.218%	3.764%
Special 4	April 4	NR	2.611%
103	April 11	2.940%	3.635%
104	April 18	2.904%	3.642%
105	April 25	2.958%	3.043%
106	May 2	3.065%	2.777%
107	May 9	3.452%	3.862%
108	May 16	3.158%	3.673%
109	May 23	2.874%	2.886%
110	May 30	3.145%	3.610%
111	June 6	2.935%	3.302%
112	June 13	3.149%	3.883%
113	June 20	3.047%	3.590%
114	June 27	3.329%	3.836%
115	July 4	2.906%	3.234%
116	July 11	3.344%	3.913%
117	July 18	2.879%	3.529%
118	July 25	2.984%	3.141%
119	August 1	2.699%	2.810%
120	August 8	2.971%	3.671%
121	August 15	2.608%	3.186%
122	August 22	2.952%	3.548%
123	August 29	2.983%	3.590%
124	September 5	3.086%	3.801%
125	September 12	2.917%	3.263%
126	September 19	2.713%	3.224%
127	September 26	3.414%	3.809%
128	October 3	3.814%	3.949%
129	October 10	2.944%	2.917%
130	October 17	2.836%	3.418%
131	October 24	3.266%	3.701%
132	October 31	2.842%	3.614%
133	November 7	3.008%	3.753%
134	November 14	3.608%	3.747%
135	November 21	3.066%	3.328%
136	November 28	3.256%	3.764%
137	December 5	3.113%	3.472%
138	December 12	3.425%	4.131%
139	December 19	3.244%	3.933%
140	December 26	3.695%	4.368%

=== 2021 ===
List of ratings in 2021 (episode 141–192)

Episode	Date	AGB Nielsen	
Episode	Date	Nationwide	Seoul Capital Area
141	January 2	3.161%	3.747%
142	January 9	3.861%	4.263%
143	January 16	3.574%	4.341%
144	January 23	3.139%	3.635%
145	January 30	3.303%	3.924%
146	February 6	3.246%	3.572%
147	February 13	3.422%	3.591%
148	February 20	3.500%	4.278%
149	February 27	3.314%	4.075%
150	March 6	3.468%	4.694%
151	March 13	3.559%	3.996%
152	March 20	3.398%	3.633%
153	March 27	3.357%	3.909%
154	April 3	3.923%	4.354%
155	April 10	2.805%	3.254%
156	April 17	4.216%	5.407%
157	April 24	3.224%	3.586%
158	May 1	3.182%	3.715%
159	May 8	2.931%	3.340%
160	May 15	3.391%	4.098%
161	May 22	3.237%	3.623%
162	May 29	2.843%	3.640%
163	June 5	2.866%	3.465%
164	June 12	2.660%	2.591%
165	June 19	2.627%	3.172%
166	June 26	2.987%	3.432%
167	July 3	3.010%	3.146%
168	July 10	3.347%	3.720%
169	July 17	2.750%	2.990%
170	July 24	3.314%	3.914%
171	July 31	2.239%	2.228%
172	August 7	2.855%	3.403%
173	August 14	3.049%	3.366%
174	August 21	2.879%	3.368%
175	August 28	3.259%	3.467%
176	September 4	2.600%	2.898%
177	September 11	2.655%	3.257%
178	September 18	2.349%	2.570%
179	September 25	2.196%	2.493%
180	October 2	2.500%	2.803%
181	October 9	2.483%	3.040%
182	October 16	2.856%	3.250%
183	October 23	2.571%	3.129%
184	October 30	2.320%	2.577%
185	November 6	3.061%	3.311%
186	November 13	2.028%	2.183%
187	November 20	2.758%	3.040%
188	November 27	2.745%	2.993%
189	December 4	2.538%	3.005%
190	December 11	2.521%	2.719%
191	December 18	2.664%	3.121%
192	December 25	2.396%	2.570%

=== 2022 ===
List of ratings in 2022 (episode 193–244)

Episode	Date	AGB Nielsen	
Episode	Date	Nationwide	Seoul Capital Area
193	January 1	2.897%	3.226%
194	January 8	2.638%	3.237%
195 (Note: Due to the broadcast of the South Korea's national soccer team warm-up match against Iceland, this episode aired early at 18:00 (KST).)	January 15	1.531%	2.059%
196	January 22	2.290%	2.604%
197	January 29	3.029%	2.898%
198	February 5	2.510%	2.478%
199	February 12	2.706%	3.097%
200	February 19	2.777%	3.149%
201	February 26	2.480%	3.062%
202	March 5	2.530%	2.975%
203	March 12	2.575%	3.105%
204	March 19	3.054%	3.672%
205	March 26	2.506%	2.811%
206	April 2	2.727%	3.071%
207	April 9	2.855%	3.327%
208	April 16	2.930%	3.014%
209	April 23	2.575%	2.670%
210	April 30	2.061%	2.357%
211	May 7	2.228%	2.558%
212	May 14	2.391%	2.663%
213	May 21	2.206%	2.454%
214	May 28	2.505%	2.866%
215	June 4	1.819%	2.033%
216	June 11	2.327%	2.658%
217	June 18	2.358%	2.546%
218	June 25	2.844%	3.226%
219	July 2	2.435%	2.748%
220	July 9	2.354%	2.691%
221	July 16	2.066%	2.199%
222	July 23	2.411%	2.859%
223	July 30	2.485%	2.788%
224	August 6	2.932%	3.551%
225	August 13	2.430%	2.457%
226	August 20	2.467%	2.930%
227	August 27	2.445%	2.766%
228	September 3	2.382%	2.702%
229	September 10	2.157%	2.139%
230	September 17	2.634%	2.994%
231	September 24	2.594%	2.885%
232	October 1	2.590%	3.033%
233	October 8	2.149%	2.294%
234	October 15	1.993%	2.232%
235	October 22	2.133%	2.416%
236	October 29	2.240%	2.869%
237	November 12	2.675%	3.360%
238	November 19	2.969%	3.364%
239	November 26	2.839%	3.548%
240	December 3	2.512%	2.856%
241	December 10	2.861%	3.419%
242	December 17	2.445%	3.023%
243	December 24	2.218%	2.439%
244	December 31	2.755%	3.334%

=== 2023 ===
List of ratings in 2023 (episode 245–296)

Episode	Date	AGB Nielsen	
Episode	Date	Nationwide	Seoul Capital Area
245	January 7	2.689%	3.301%
246	January 14	2.768%	3.156%
247	January 21	2.135%	2.277%
248	January 28	3.185%	3.942%
249	February 4	2.699%	3.267%
250	February 11	3.008%	3.195%
251	February 18	2.532%	3.154%
252	February 25	2.610%	3.043%
253	March 4	2.702%	3.099%
254	March 11	2.306%	2.700%
255	March 18	1.989%	2.313%
256	March 25	2.372%	2.638%
257	April 1	2.350%	2.636%
258	April 8	1.912%	2.105%
259	April 15	2.450%	3.124%
260	April 22	2.572%	2.625%
261	April 29	2.244%	2.672%
262	May 6	3.110%	3.322%
263	May 13	2.217%	2.323%
264	May 20	2.438%	2.834%
265	May 27	2.363%	2.999%
266	June 3	2.122%	2.528%
267	June 10	2.059%	2.522%
268	June 17	2.090%	2.513%
269	June 24	2.362%	2.955%
270	July 1	2.083%	2.350%
271	July 8	2.238%	2.509%
272	July 15	1.813%	2.132%
273	July 22	2.360%	2.508%
274	July 29	1.995%	2.397%
275	August 5	2.258%	2.599%
276	August 12	2.000%	2.240%
277	August 19	1.679%	1.900%
278	August 26	1.729%	1.685%
279	September 2	1.640%	1.670%
280	September 9	2.317%	2.745%
281	September 16	2.355%	2.590%
282	September 23	2.305%	2.662%
283	September 30	2.111%	2.009%
284	October 7	1.820%	2.024%
285	October 14	3.853%	3.932%
286	October 21	2.258%	2.534%
287	October 28	2.445%	2.508%
288	November 4	2.596%	2.692%
289	November 11	2.231%	2.435%
290	November 18	2.011%	2.061%
291	November 25	2.416%	2.622%
292	December 2	2.510%	2.884%
293	December 9	2.491%	2.808%
294	December 16	2.420%	2.556%
295	December 23	2.026%	—N/a (Note: Due to an internal server error on Nielsen Korea's website, the ratings are unknown.)
296	December 30	2.383%	—N/a

=== 2024 ===
List of ratings in 2024 (episode 297–347)

Episode	Date	AGB Nielsen	
Episode	Date	Nationwide	Seoul Capital Area
297	January 6	2.319%	2.339%
298	January 13	2.197%	2.201%
299	January 27	2.443%	2.644%
300	February 3	2.470%	—N/a
301	February 10	1.924%	1.844%
302	February 17	2.736%	3.223%
303	February 24	2.210%	2.326%
304	March 2	2.224%	2.479%
305	March 9	2.218%	2.577%
306	March 16	2.169%	2.387%
307	March 23	2.293%	2.503%
308	March 30	2.011%	1.904%
309	April 6	2.034%	2.105%
310	April 13	2.627%	2.715%
311	April 20	2.301%	2.444%
312	April 27	2.542%	3.088%
313	May 4	1.758%	1.800%
314	May 11	2.306%	2.449%
315	May 18	1.886%	2.149%
316	May 25	2.127%	2.285%
317	June 1	2.520%	2.817%
318	June 8	2.272%	2.543%
319	June 15	2.341%	2.618%
320	June 22	2.470%	2.577%
321	June 29	2.823%	2.551%
322	July 6	3.025%	3.256%
323	July 13	2.253%	2.505%
324	July 20	2.595%	2.687%
325	July 27	3.118%	3.428%
326	August 3	1.769%	1.617%
327	August 10	2.096%	2.260%
328	August 17	3.114%	3.435%
329	August 24	2.577%	2.602%
330	August 31	2.473%	2.430%
331	September 7	3.086%	3.204%
332	September 14	2.675%	3.118%
333	September 21	2.824%	3.078%
334	September 28	2.587%	2.470%
335	October 5	2.508%	2.714%
336	October 12	2.237%	2.398%
337	October 19	2.637%	2.738%
338	October 26	2.964%	3.096%
339	November 2	2.623%	2.901%
340	November 9	3.158%	3.584%
341	November 16	2.332%	2.775%
342	November 23	2.744%	2.954%
343	November 30	2.728%	3.023%
344	December 7	1.926%	2.151%
345	December 14	2.578%	2.516%
346	December 21	2.990%	3.356%
347	December 28	2.473%	2.728%

=== 2025 ===
List of ratings in 2025 (episode 348–398)

Episode	Date	AGB Nielsen	
Episode	Date	Nationwide	Seoul Capital Area
348	January 11	2.422%	2.723%
349	January 18	2.571%	2.878%
350	January 25	2.065%	2.236%
351	February 1	2.781%	3.308%
352	February 8	2.760%	3.045%
353	February 15	2.718%	3.101%
354	February 22	2.614%	3.006%
355	March 1	2.508%	3.183%
356	March 8	2.356%	2.494%
357	March 15	2.120%	2.387%
358	March 22	2.195%	2.307%
359	March 29	2.172%	2.456%
360	April 5	2.223%	2.306%
361	April 12	2.348%	2.804%
362	April 19	2.252%	2.603%
363	April 26	1.989%	2.355%
364	May 3	2.025%	2.247%
365	May 10	2.394%	2.958%
366	May 17	1.755%	2.018%
367	May 24	1.942%	2.379%
368	May 31	1.741%	1.812%
369	June 7	2.046%	2.405%
370	June 14	1.944%	2.064%
371	June 21	1.865%	2.179%
372	June 28	2.066%	2.116%
373	July 5	1.731%	2.000%
374	July 12	2.008%	2.426%
375	July 19	1.8%	2.111%
376	July 26	1.918%	2.191%
377	August 2	2.185%	2.579%
378	August 9	2.198%	2.609%
379	August 16	2.021%	2.281%
380	August 23	1.927%	2.401%
381	August 30	1.834%	1.954%
382	September 6	2.635%	3.238%
383	September 13	2.573%	2.885%
384	September 20	2.689%	2.737%
385	September 27	2.608%	2.572%
386	October 4	2.516%	2.451%
387	October 11	2.315%	2.696%
388	October 18	2.039%	2.320%
389	October 25	2.509%	2.533%
390	November 1	2.117%	2.501%
391	November 8	2.329%	2.315%
392	November 15	2.148%	2.581%
393	November 22	2.247%	2.525%
394	November 29	2.077%	2.252%
395	December 6	2.149%	2.303%
396	December 13	1.976%	2.333%
397	December 20	1.598%	1.770%
398	December 27	1.858%	1.839%

=== 2026 ===
List of ratings in 2026 (episode 399–present)

Episode	Date	AGB Nielsen	
Episode	Date	Nationwide	Seoul Capital Area
399	January 3	1.769%	1.936%
400	January 10	2.046%	2.265%
401	January 17	1.533%	1.695%
402	January 24	1.762%	2.012%
403	January 31	2.055%	2.279%
404	February 7	2.860%	3.009%
405	February 14	2.368%	2.798%
406	February 21	2.607%	2.720%
407	February 28	2.504%	3.060%
408	March 14	2.121%	2.089%
409	March 21	1.660%	1.838%
410	March 28	1.659%	1.996%
411	April 4	1.862%	1.976%
412	April 11	1.773%	2.200%
413	April 18	1.870%	1.955%
414	April 25	1.992%	2.356%
415	May 2	1.818%	2.243%
416	May 9	1.714%	2.114%
417	May 16	1.552%	1.730%
418	May 23	1.838%	2.049%
419	May 30	1.948%	2.244%
420	June 6	1.548%	1.704%
421	June 13	1.702%	1.940%
422	June 20	1.638%	1.948%
423	June 27	1.864%	2.001%
424	July 4	1.496%	1.433%
425	July 11	1.512%	1.840%
426	July 18	1.500%	1.601%
427	July 25	1.729%	1.833%
428	August 1	2.019%	2.198%
429	August 8	2.006%	2.226%
430	August 15	1.721%	1.944%
431	August 22	1.839%	1.994%
432	August 29	1.556%	1.765%
433	September 5	1.632%	1.498%
434	September 12	1.804%	1.998%
435	September 19	1.790%	1.614%
436	October 3	1.240%	NR
437	October 10	1.669%	2.054%
438	October 17	1.734%	1.776%
439	October 24	1.961%	2.145%
440	October 31	1.758%	1.884%
441	November 7	1.750%	1.947%
442	November 14	1.652%	1.645%
443	November 21	1.870%	2.300%
444	November 28	%	%

- Note that the show airs on a cable channel (pay TV), which plays part in its slower uptake and relatively small audience share when compared to programs broadcast (FTA) on public networks such as KBS, SBS, MBC or EBS.
- NR rating means "not reported". The rating is low.
- Beginning November 17, 2026, the updated Nielsen Korea website does not show the ratings in up to 3 decimal places, but only up to 1 decimal place.

== Spin-offs ==
=== Idol Dictation Contest ===
A web television spin-off of the program titled Idol Dictation Contest (아이돌 받아쓰기 대회) was announced, and each episode would be released on Fridays at 15:00 (KST) for four weeks on TVING from May 21, 2021. It is known as the Idol version of the program. The spin-off stars Boom and Small-mouthed Haetnim as the non-playing cast members, with Eunhyuk (Super Junior), Lee Jin-ho, Jaejae, Ravi (VIXX), Kai (EXO), Mijoo (Lovelyz), Lee Jang-jun (Golden Child), Seungkwan (Seventeen) and Choi Ye-na as the playing cast members. The spin-off is slightly different from the main program, as in each episode it featured only one round of song dictation and one Dessert Time game.

The web series returned for Season 2, with Kai, Seungkwan and Lee Jang-jun not returning, and Lee Know (Stray Kids) joining the show as a new playing cast member. In addition, guests would appear for this season. Each 3-part episode would be released on Thursdays at 16:00 (KST) for six weeks on TVING from December 16, 2021.

New Dessert Time games were introduced only for Idol Dictation Contest:

- CM Song Quiz: Answer the correct brand based on its commercial song.
- Caption Quiz: Answer the correct caption based on a capture of a variety show.
- Album Jacket Quiz: Answer the singer/group's name along with the correct name of the title song based on the picture of the singer/group's album cover.
- Silhouette Quiz: Answer the correct song title and its singer based on the silhouette of the song's choreography.
- Boom's Broadcast Dance Academy: Answer the correct song title and its singer based on the step-by-step descriptions of the dance said out by Boom.

==== Season 1 ====
List of episodes (Season 1 - 2021)

Episodes

– Success on first attempt
– Success on second attempt
– Success on third attempt
– Failed

Ep.	Broadcast Date	Dressing Theme Concept	Song Question + Dessert Time Game	Dictation Theme + Choices
1–3	May 21	Idols on Stage	Wonder Girls - R.E.A.L	2nd Generation: Wonder Girls; Taeyang (Big Bang)
1–3	May 21	Idols on Stage	Taeyang (Big Bang) - Ringa Linga (Note: Due to the short recording time on the song dictation segment, the cast members agreed to take on the other song dictation choice for additional food and footage.)	2nd Generation: Wonder Girls; Taeyang (Big Bang)
1–3	May 21	Idols on Stage	Doppelganger Quiz (Idols)	2nd Generation: Wonder Girls; Taeyang (Big Bang)
4–5	May 28	Idols on their Way to Work	Candycore - Half-Half, Lots of Radish	Food Song: Orange Caramel; Candycore
4–5	May 28	Idols on their Way to Work	CM Song Quiz	Food Song: Orange Caramel; Candycore
6–8	June 4	Idols in their Practice Rooms	Kim Yong-gyu, Faith - Remember Vectorman	OST: Choi Woo-shik, Jang Ki-yong; Vectorman
6–8	June 4	Idols in their Practice Rooms	Caption Quiz	OST: Choi Woo-shik, Jang Ki-yong; Vectorman
9‍–‍10	June 11	Idols' Airport Fashion	DPR Live - Text Me	Hell: Zico (Block B); DPR Live
9‍–‍10	June 11	Idols' Airport Fashion	Album Jacket Quiz	Hell: Zico (Block B); DPR Live

One Shots

The cast member(s) who got a One Shot (meaning that this cast member has jotted down the closest answer to the correct answer on the first listen, only on the first attempt of the song dictation) are as listed:

Episode	One Shot Recipient(s)
1–3	Jaejae
4–5	Jaejae
6–8	Choi Ye-na
9–10	Jaejae

Dessert Time

The cast members who won the dessert first and last, and the cast member who failed to win the dessert from the Dessert Time game are as listed:

Episode	Game	First	Last	Failed
1–3	Doppelganger Quiz (Idols)	Jaejae	Lee Jin-ho	Ravi
4–5	CM Song Quiz	Kai	Ravi	Mijoo
6–8	Caption Quiz	Jaejae	Lee Jang-jun	Mijoo
9–10	Album Jacket Quiz	Seungkwan	Mijoo	Kai

==== Season 2 ====
List of episodes (Season 2 - 2021–2022)

Episodes

– Success on first attempt
– Success on second attempt
– Success on third attempt
– Failed

Ep.	Broadcast Date	Dressing Theme Concept	Song Question + Dessert Time Game	Guests
1–3	December 16	New Semester	Jay Park - SUMMERIDE	Enhypen (Jay, Jake)
1–3	December 16	New Semester	Silhouette Quiz	Enhypen (Jay, Jake)
4–6	December 23	Idol Music Awards	Zico (Block B) - Actually	SF9 (Inseong, Taeyang)
4–6	December 23	Idol Music Awards	New/Old OST Quiz (Animations)	SF9 (Inseong, Taeyang)
7‍–‍9	December 30	Child Care	Oh My Girl - Hot Summer Nights	Itzy (Ryujin, Chaeryeong)
7‍–‍9	December 30	Child Care	Boom's Broadcast Dance Academy	Itzy (Ryujin, Chaeryeong)
10‍–‍12	January 6, 2022	Found It! My Life Song	Heize - My Boyfriend Says Thank You	Oh My Girl (Mimi, YooA)
10‍–‍12	January 6, 2022	Found It! My Life Song	Music Video Scene Quiz	Oh My Girl (Mimi, YooA)
13‍–‍15	January 13	I'm An Advertisement Model	Park Hyo-shin - Go	Hanhae, Key (SHINee), Lee Yong-jin (Note: Standing in for Lee Jin-ho)
13‍–‍15	January 13	I'm An Advertisement Model	Boom's Broadcast Dance Academy	Hanhae, Key (SHINee), Lee Yong-jin
16‍–‍18	January 20	My Idol	Monsta X - Stand Together	The Boyz (Juyeon, New)
16‍–‍18	January 20	My Idol	Silhouette Quiz	The Boyz (Juyeon, New)

One Shots

The cast member/guest(s) who got a One Shot (meaning that this cast member/guest has jotted down the closest answer to the correct answer on the first listen, only on the first attempt of the song dictation) are as listed:

(Names in bold are the guests of the episodes.)

Episode	One Shot Recipient(s)
1–3	Mijoo
4–6	Eunhyuk, Ravi
7–9	Choi Ye-na
10–12	Jaejae
13–15	Jaejae
16–18	**New**

Dessert Time

The cast members who won the dessert first and last, and the cast member who failed to win the dessert from the Dessert Time game are as listed:

(Names in bold are the guests of the episodes.)

Episode	Game	First	Last	Failed
1–3	Silhouette Quiz	Lee Know	**Jake**	Ravi
4–6	New/Old OST Quiz (Animations)	Choi Ye-na	Lee Know	Ravi
7–9	Boom's Broadcast Dance Academy	Jaejae	Ravi	Lee Jin-ho
10–12	Music Video Scene Quiz	Jaejae	Lee Jin-ho	Ravi
13–15	Boom's Broadcast Dance Academy	Choi Ye-na	Mijoo	Lee Know
16–18	Silhouette Quiz	Jaejae	Lee Know	Ravi

=== Amazing Thursday ===
On February 20, 2026, tvN announced a new spin-off of the show in five years, titled Amazing Thursday (놀라운 목요일). The spin-off would be a 4-episode pilot program, and would air every Thursday at 20:40 (KST) beginning March 19 to April 9. The spin-off stars Boom as host, with Lee Yong-jin, Jung Yi-rang, Zo Zazz, and BtoB's Seo Eun-kwang as the fixed cast members. Different from the main show, this spin-off is a music variety show with a karaoke concept, where two teams compete head-to-head in singing. Each team would earn Boom Coins, which can be exchanged for snacks and drinks, and the team with more Boom Coins at the end of each episode wins.

Each episode would feature three main corners:

- Blank Karaoke
  - Each team will choose one random song and arrange the team's singing order on the piano stage. The team member has to sing the line when the key below him/her lights up.
  - When there is a blank(s) on a line, the team member responsible for the line will have to sing it with the blank(s) filled.
  - There would be three rounds played, and for every blank filled correctly, 3 Boom Coins would be given.
- Sing Karaoke
  - Each team will send out representative(s) to cover a song on the piano stage with their own styles and impersonations.
  - The winning team would be decided through voting of the production team.
  - There would be two rounds played, and the winning team for each round gets 20 Boom Coins. For only episode 2, the winning team for each round would get 40 Boom Coins.
  - In the case of a tie in a round, each team gets 10 Boom Coins instead.
- Blank Attack Karaoke
  - Before the start of each round, a fixed number of team members for each team that can be on stage would be informed for the round.
  - Each team will choose one random song and arrange the team's singing order on the piano stage. The team member has to sing the line when the key below him/her lights up. However, different from Blank Karaoke, the opposing team can choose which key to light up at any time.
  - When there is a blank(s) on a line, the team member responsible for the line will have to sing it with the blank(s) filled.
  - There would be two rounds played, and for every blank filled correctly, 3 Boom Coins would be given.
List of episodes (2026)

Episodes

Ep.	Broadcast Date	Corner	Yong Family/Representative(s)	Song	Result	Jung Family/Representative(s)	Song	Result
1	March 19	Blank Karaoke	Lee Yong-jin, Zo Zazz, KCM, Kim Ye-won, Lee Jae-youl, Tomorrow X Together (Yeonjun, Taehyun)	Baek Ji-young - Like Being Shot	5/8	Jung Yi-rang, Seo Eun-kwang, Kim Jang-hoon, Kim Hae-jun, Na Bo-ram, Song Jin-woo, Kim Min-ji, Shin Hyeon-woo	Kim Bum-soo - I Miss You	8/8
1	March 19	Blank Karaoke	Lee Yong-jin, Zo Zazz, KCM, Kim Ye-won, Lee Jae-youl, Tomorrow X Together (Yeonjun, Taehyun)	Busker Busker - Cherry Blossom Ending	7/8	Jung Yi-rang, Seo Eun-kwang, Kim Jang-hoon, Kim Hae-jun, Na Bo-ram, Song Jin-woo, Kim Min-ji, Shin Hyeon-woo	Zaza - On The Bus	7/11
1	March 19	Blank Karaoke	Lee Yong-jin, Zo Zazz, KCM, Kim Ye-won, Lee Jae-youl, Tomorrow X Together (Yeonjun, Taehyun)	Apink - Mr. Chu	7/11	Jung Yi-rang, Seo Eun-kwang, Kim Jang-hoon, Kim Hae-jun, Na Bo-ram, Song Jin-woo, Kim Min-ji, Shin Hyeon-woo	Kim Hyun-jung - Bruise	8/8
1	March 19	Sing Karaoke	Yeonjun, Taehyun	Uhm Jung-hwa - Invitation	Win	Kim Hae-jun, Na Bo-ram	Hong Seo-beom, Cho Gab-kyung - My Love To You	Lose
1	March 19	Sing Karaoke	Zo Zazz	Deulgukhwa - Please Please	Lose	Seo Eun-kwang	Lee Jung-hyun - Change	Win
1	March 19	Blank Attack Karaoke	Zo Zazz, KCM, Kim Ye-won, Yeonjun, Taehyun	Izi - Emergency Room	4/6	Seo Eun-kwang, Kim Jang-hoon, Song Jin-woo, Na Bo-ram, Shin Hyeon-woo	TVXQ - Hug	2/6
1	March 19	Blank Attack Karaoke	Kim Ye-won, Yeonjun, Taehyun	Cool - All For You	5/7	Jung Yi-rang, Kim Hae-jun, Kim Min-ji	Davichi - 8282	4/5
1	March 19	—N/a	**Final Boom Coin Count**		**135**	**Final Boom Coin Count**		**137**
2	March 26	Blank Karaoke	Lee Yong-jin, Seo Eun-kwang, Kim Ye-won, Lee Jae-youl, Song Jin-woo, Kim Min-ji, Shin Hyeon-woo	Lee Jung-hyun - Wa	6/7	Jung Yi-rang, Zo Zazz, Kim Jang-hoon, Kim Hae-jun, Na Bo-ram, KickFlip (Kyehoon, Keiju)	BoA - No. 1	4/7
2	March 26	Blank Karaoke	Lee Yong-jin, Seo Eun-kwang, Kim Ye-won, Lee Jae-youl, Song Jin-woo, Kim Min-ji, Shin Hyeon-woo	Kara - Pretty Girl	1/5	Jung Yi-rang, Zo Zazz, Kim Jang-hoon, Kim Hae-jun, Na Bo-ram, KickFlip (Kyehoon, Keiju)	IU - Good Day	2/5
2	March 26	Blank Karaoke	Lee Yong-jin, Seo Eun-kwang, Kim Ye-won, Lee Jae-youl, Song Jin-woo, Kim Min-ji, Shin Hyeon-woo	Hong Kyung-min - Shaky Friendship	6/8	Jung Yi-rang, Zo Zazz, Kim Jang-hoon, Kim Hae-jun, Na Bo-ram, KickFlip (Kyehoon, Keiju)	Park Sang-cheol - Unconditional	5/6
2	March 26	Sing Karaoke	Lee Jae-youl	Silica Gel - No Pain	Lose	Kyehoon, Keiju	Kim Sung-jae - As I Told You	Win
2	March 26	Sing Karaoke	Song Jin-woo	Luis Fonsi (feat. Daddy Yankee) - Despacito	Lose	Kim Jang-hoon	Kim Hyun-sik - My Love By My Side	Win
2	March 26	Blank Attack Karaoke	Lee Yong-jin, Seo Eun-kwang, Kim Ye-won, Lee Jae-youl, Song Jin-woo, Kim Min-ji, Shin Hyeon-woo	Koyote - Pure Love	4/9	Jung Yi-rang, Zo Zazz, Kim Jang-hoon, Kim Hae-jun, Na Bo-ram, Kyehoon, Keiju	F.T. Island - Lovesick	1/8
2	March 26	Blank Attack Karaoke	Seo Eun-kwang, Lee Jae-youl, Song Jin-woo, Kim Min-ji, Shin Hyeon-woo	Lee Moon-sae - Sunset Glow	7/8	Zo Zazz, Kim Jang-hoon, Kim Hae-jun, Na Bo-ram, Kyehoon	Lee Seung-chul - Girls' Generation	3/9
2	March 26	Blank Attack Karaoke	Lee Yong-jin, Song Jin-woo, Shin Hyeon-woo	Buzz - Travel to Me	3/5	—N/a (Note: The bonus round is for the Yong Family to attempt to overtake Jung Family in the final Boom Coin count.)		
2	March 26	—N/a	**Final Boom Coin Count**		**99**	**Final Boom Coin Count**		**100**
3	April 2	Blank Karaoke	Lee Yong-jin, Seo Eun-kwang, Kim Jang-hoon, Park Kwang-jae, Kim Ji-yu, Wendy (Red Velvet), TWS (Dohoon, Youngjae)	Yoon Soo-il - Apartment	3/6	Jung Yi-rang, Zo Zazz, KCM, Kim Ye-won, Tanaka, No Min-woo, KiiiKiii (Sui, Kya)	Wonder Girls - Tell Me	3/8
3	April 2	Blank Karaoke	Lee Yong-jin, Seo Eun-kwang, Kim Jang-hoon, Park Kwang-jae, Kim Ji-yu, Wendy (Red Velvet), TWS (Dohoon, Youngjae)	Eco - Happy Me	9/10	Jung Yi-rang, Zo Zazz, KCM, Kim Ye-won, Tanaka, No Min-woo, KiiiKiii (Sui, Kya)	Kang Jin - Wild Bee	8/10
3	April 2	Blank Karaoke	Lee Yong-jin, Seo Eun-kwang, Kim Jang-hoon, Park Kwang-jae, Kim Ji-yu, Wendy (Red Velvet), TWS (Dohoon, Youngjae)	Lee Moon-sae - Midnight Flying	2/7	Jung Yi-rang, Zo Zazz, KCM, Kim Ye-won, Tanaka, No Min-woo, KiiiKiii (Sui, Kya)	Lee Hyori - 10 Minutes	6/9
3	April 2	Sing Karaoke	Dohoon, Youngjae	H.O.T. - Candy	Win	Sui, Kya	2NE1 - Come Back Home	Lose
3	April 2	Sing Karaoke	Wendy	Kim Bum-soo - Last Love	Win	KCM	Kim Min-woo - It's Just Love	Lose
3	April 2	Blank Attack Karaoke	Lee Yong-jin, Seo Eun-kwang, Park Kwang-jae, Wendy, Youngjae	Country Kko Kko - Gimme! Gimme!	4/9	Kim Ye-won, Tanaka, No Min-woo, Sui, Kya	Park Hey-kyoung - Goodbye	4/8
3	April 2	Blank Attack Karaoke	Kim Jang-hoon, Dohoon, Youngjae	Day6 - Time of Our Life	5/5	Kim Ye-won, Sui, Kya	Younha - Password 486	9/11
3	April 2	—N/a	**Final Boom Coin Count**		**149**	**Final Boom Coin Count**		**148**
4	April 9	Sing Karaoke	Alpha Drive One (Sangwon, Xinlong)	Blackpink - Kill This Love	Tie	Sandeul (B1A4)	Mose - It's Love	Tie
4	April 9	Sing Karaoke	Kwak Min-kyung, Sung Baek-hyun	The Classic - Magic Castle	Win	Tanaka, No Min-woo	Carrot Song (children's song)	Lose
4	April 9	Blank Karaoke	Lee Yong-jin, Zo Zazz, Kim Ye-won, Kim Ji-yu, Sangwon, Xinlong, Kwak Min-kyung, Sung Baek-hyun	Park Myung-soo - Prince of the Sea	3/8	Jung Yi-rang, Seo Eun-kwang, Kim Jang-hoon, Tanaka, No Min-woo, Park Kwang-jae, Sandeul	Im Sang-a - Musical	2/9
4	April 9	Blank Karaoke	Lee Yong-jin, Zo Zazz, Kim Ye-won, Kim Ji-yu, Sangwon, Xinlong, Kwak Min-kyung, Sung Baek-hyun	J.Y. Park - Honey	7/15	Jung Yi-rang, Seo Eun-kwang, Kim Jang-hoon, Tanaka, No Min-woo, Park Kwang-jae, Sandeul	Sobangcha - Story of Last Night	8/14
4	April 9	Blank Karaoke	Lee Yong-jin, Zo Zazz, Kim Ye-won, Kim Ji-yu, Sangwon, Xinlong, Kwak Min-kyung, Sung Baek-hyun	Marronnier - Cocktail Love	2/11	Jung Yi-rang, Seo Eun-kwang, Kim Jang-hoon, Tanaka, No Min-woo, Park Kwang-jae, Sandeul	Kim Hyun-jung - Breakup With Her	8/11
4	April 9	Blank Attack Karaoke	Lee Yong-jin, Zo Zazz, Kim Ye-won, Kwak Min-kyung, Sung Baek-hyun	Kim Jong-seo - Beautiful Restriction	6/8	Seo Eun-kwang, Kim Jang-hoon, Tanaka, No Min-woo, Park Kwang-jae	Position - I Love You	4/8
4	April 9	Blank Attack Karaoke	Kim Ye-won, Kim Ji-yu, Sangwon	So Chan-whee - Tears	7/7	Kim Jang-hoon, Tanaka, Sandeul	Insooni - Every Night	7/8
4	April 9	—N/a	**Final Boom Coin Count**		**136**	**Final Boom Coin Count**		**128**

== Awards and nominations ==
Year	Award	Category	Recipient(s)	Result	Ref.
2021	Brand Customer Loyalty Awards	Music Program Award	DoReMi Market	Won	
