= List of Inkigayo Chart winners (2020) =

Inkigayo Chart winners (2020)

Highlights
- Artist(s) with most wins: BTS and Blackpink (9)
- Song with highest score: "On" by BTS (10,627)

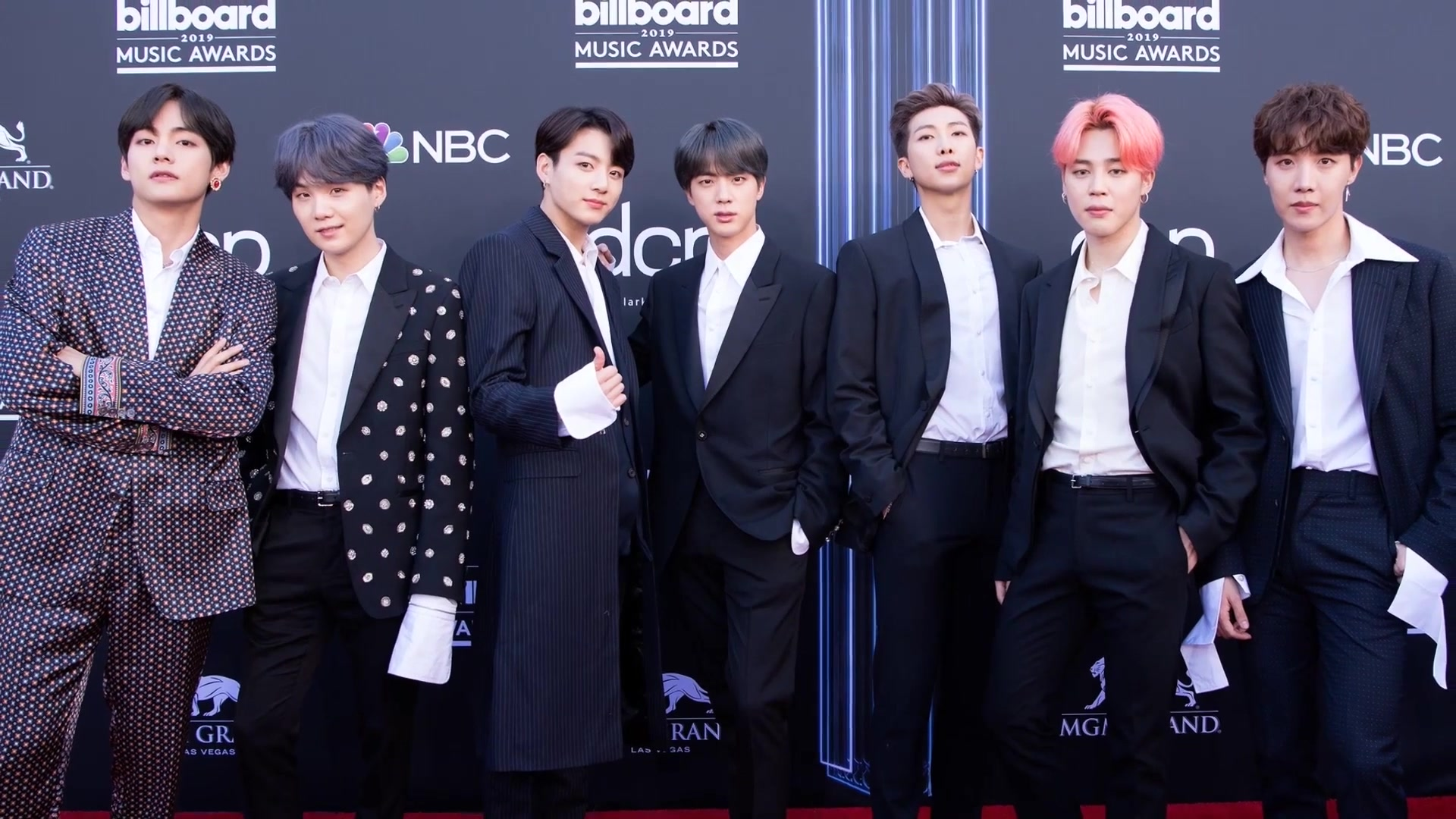
"On" by BTS had the highest score of 2020, with 10,627 on the March 8 broadcast. The song also earned a Triple Crown. Their succeeding singles "Dynamite" and "Life Goes On" also received Triple Crowns.

The Inkigayo Chart is a music program record chart on Seoul Broadcasting System (SBS) that gives an award to the best-performing single of the week in South Korea. In 2020, the chart measured digital performance in domestic online music services (5,500 points), social media via YouTube views (3,000 points), album sales (1,000 points), network on-air time (1,000 points), and advanced viewer votes (500 points), a method that had been in use since February 3, 2019. Songs that spend three weeks at number one are awarded a Triple Crown and are removed from the chart and ineligible to win again. In 2020, the show was hosted by Monsta X member Lee Min-hyuk, NCT member Jaehyun, and April member Lee Na-eun. They had been hosting the show together since October 20, 2019.

In 2020, 26 singles ranked number one on the chart and 21 music acts received an award trophy for this feat. Eleven songs collected trophies for three weeks and earned a Triple Crown: Red Velvet's "Psycho", Zico's "Any Song", BTS's "On", "Dynamite", and "Life Goes On", Itzy's "Wannabe", IU's "Eight", Blackpink's "How You Like That", "Ice Cream" and "Lovesick Girls", and Hwasa's "María". Three groups achieved their first number one on the chart in 2020. Girl group (G)I-dle achieved their first ever number one on the chart on the April 19 episode with their single "Oh My God". They went on to achieve another number one with "Dumdi Dumdi" in August. Iz*One, formed through the third season of Produce 101, gained their first Inkigayo number one with "Secret Story of the Swan" in June. Their single "Panorama" also ranked number one on the December 20 broadcast. Finally, on the February 23 broadcast, Noel's "Late Night" helped the boy band achieve their first number one on the chart.

Five soloists won their first Inkigayo award in 2020. Suho of Exo and Taemin of Shinee had their first number one on the chart with their singles "Let's Love" and "Idea", respectively. Mamamoo member Hwasa won her first ever Inkigayo award with her single "María". The single went on to rank number one for three consecutive weeks and achieved a Triple Crown. BTS ranked three singles at number one on the chart in 2020, with "On", "Dynamite" and "Life Goes On". All three singles ranked number one for three weeks and achieved Triple Crowns. Their single "On" went on to accumulate 10,627 points on the March 8 broadcast, making it the single with the highest points of the year. Member Suga ranked number one on the chart with "Eight" as a featured artist. The single also achieved a Triple Crown. In addition to BTS, girl group Blackpink also had three number one singles in 2020: "How You Like That", "Ice Cream" and "Lovesick Girls". The latter two singles helped the group rank number one for six weeks in a row, the first time this had occurred. Twice had two number one singles in 2020, achieved with "More & More" and "I Can't Stop Me". The latter went on to achieve a Triple Crown the following year.

== Chart history ==
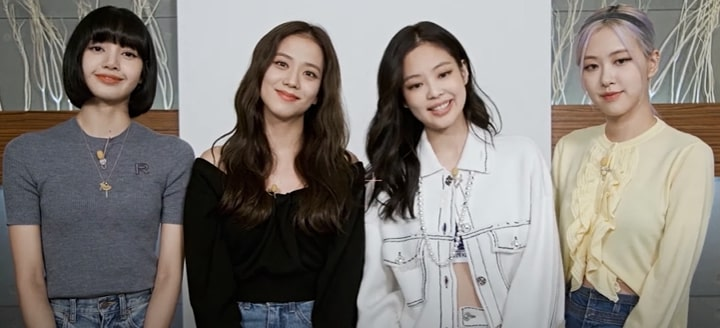
Blackpink received three Inkigayo Triple Crowns for "How You Like That", "Ice Cream" and "Lovesick Girls", making them the only female act with the most number of wins in 2020, and the first act to win six trophies in a row.

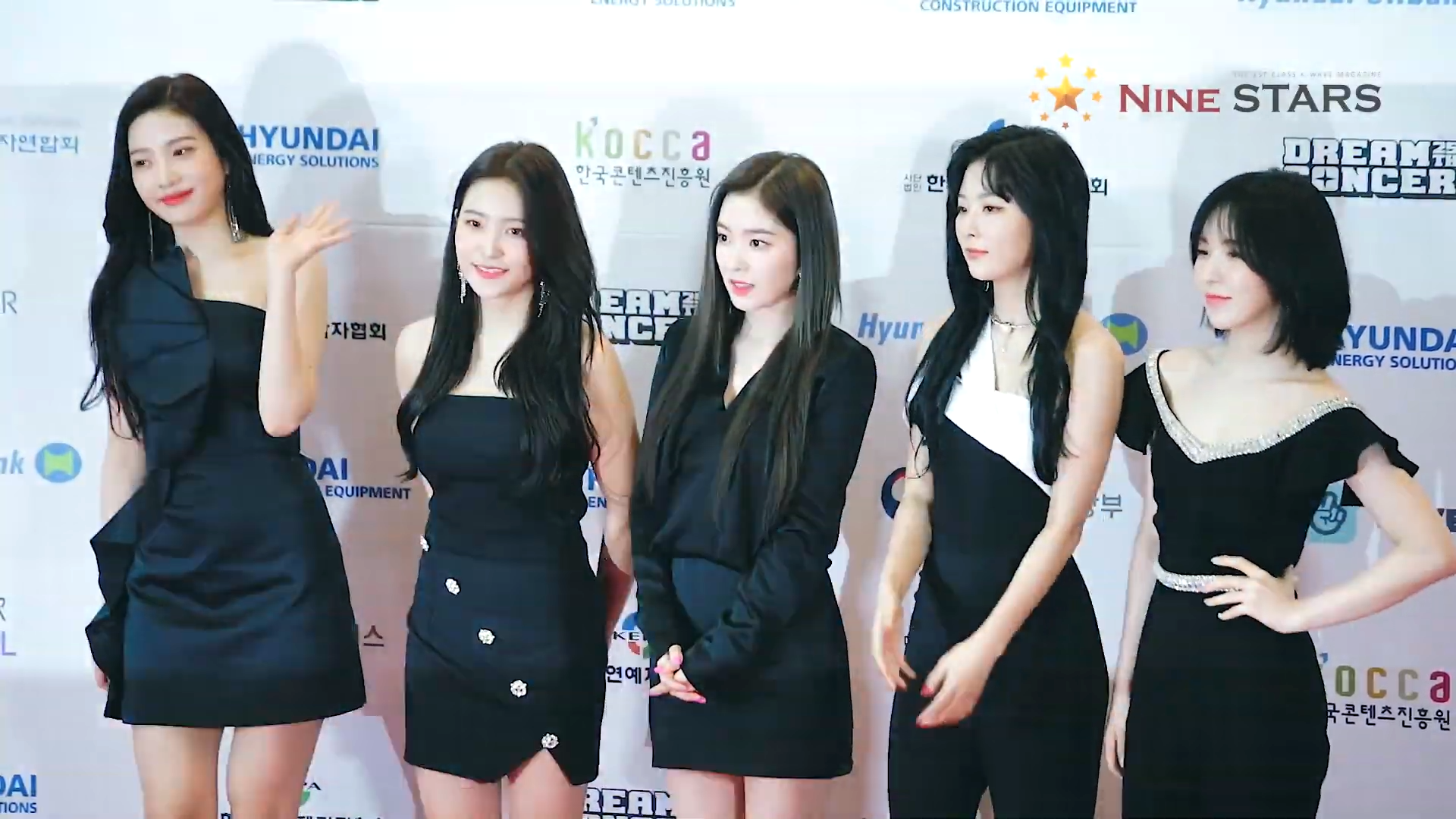
Red Velvet achieved their first Inkigayo Triple Crown with "Psycho".

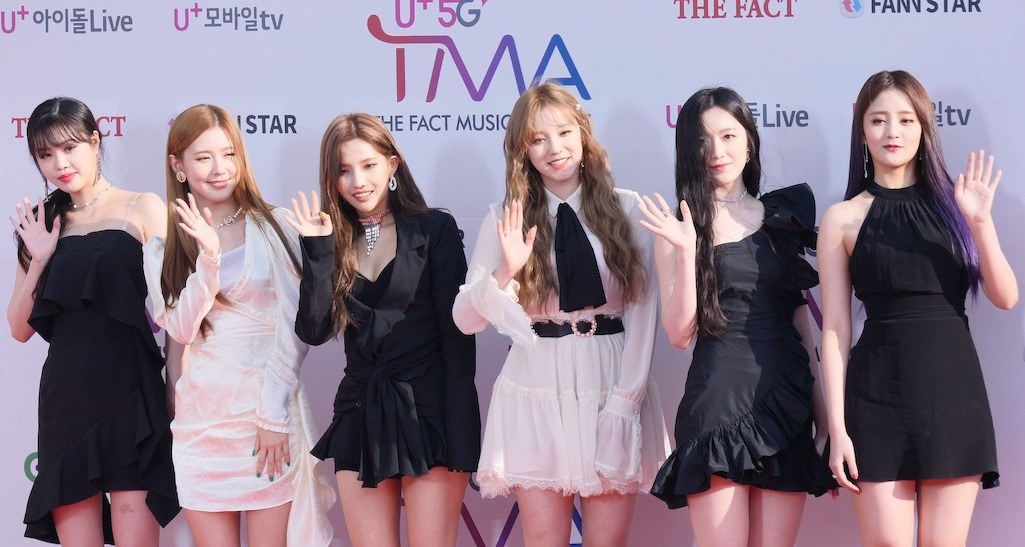
(G)I-dle received their first Inkigayo trophy with "Oh My God".

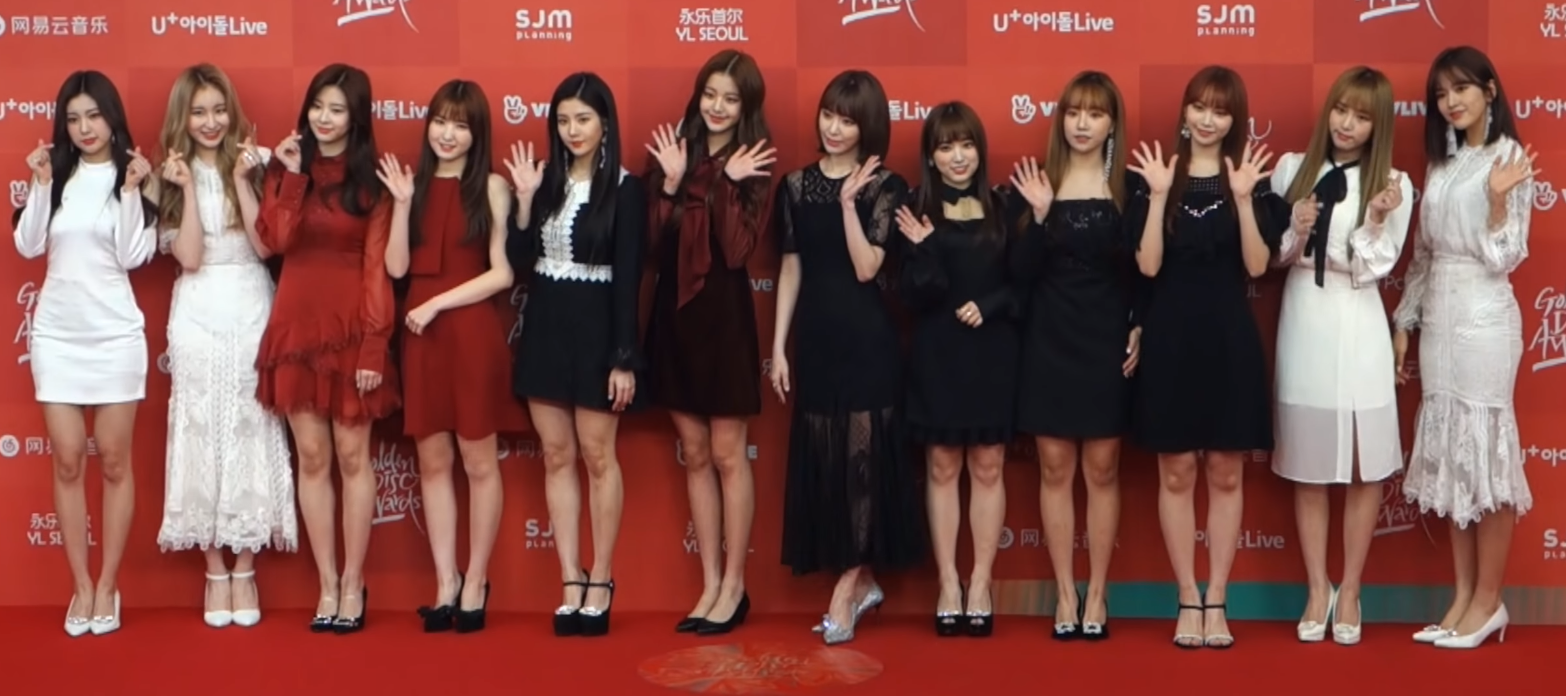
Iz*One won their first Inkigayo award with "Secret Story of the Swan".

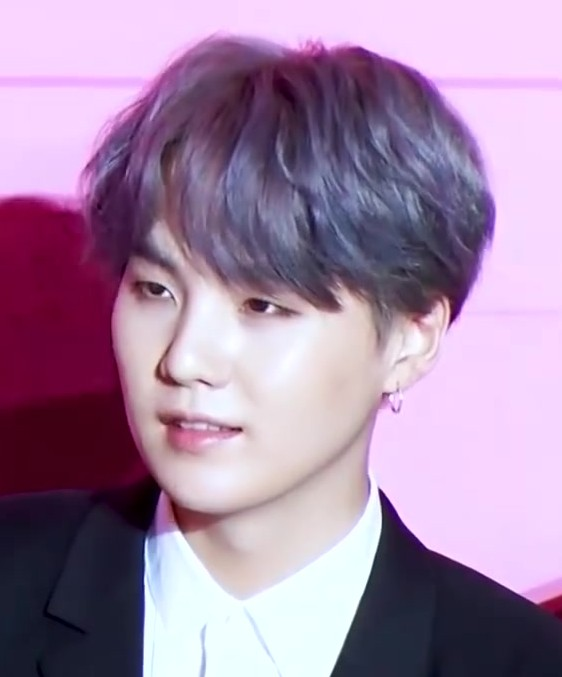
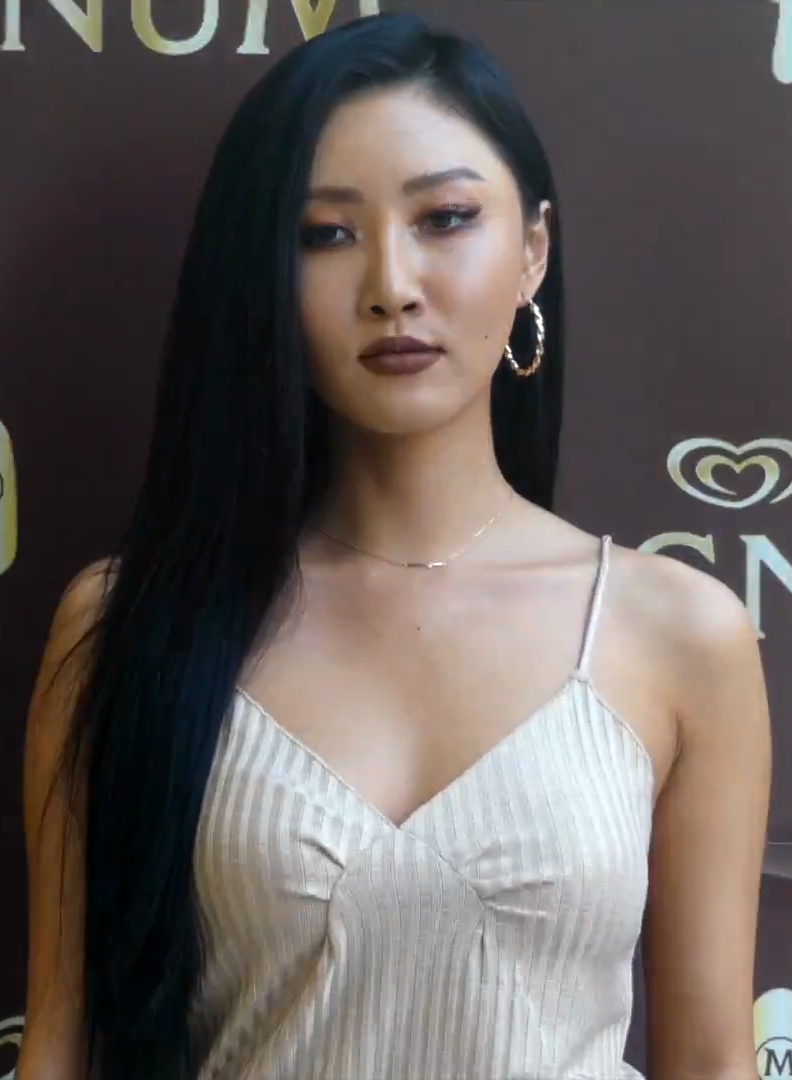
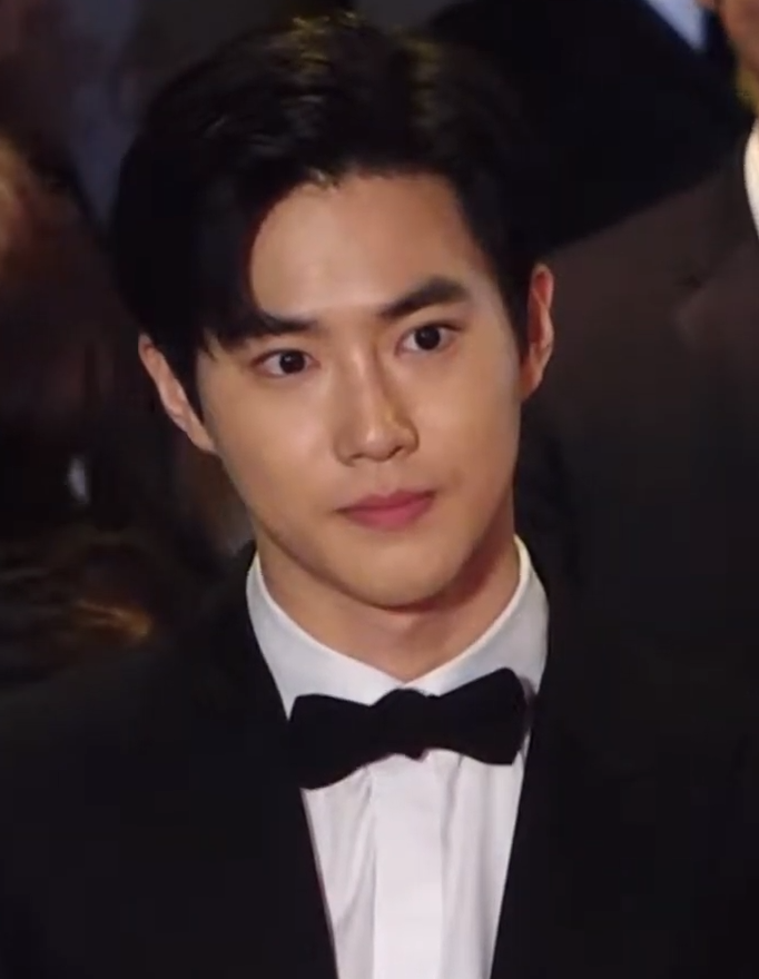
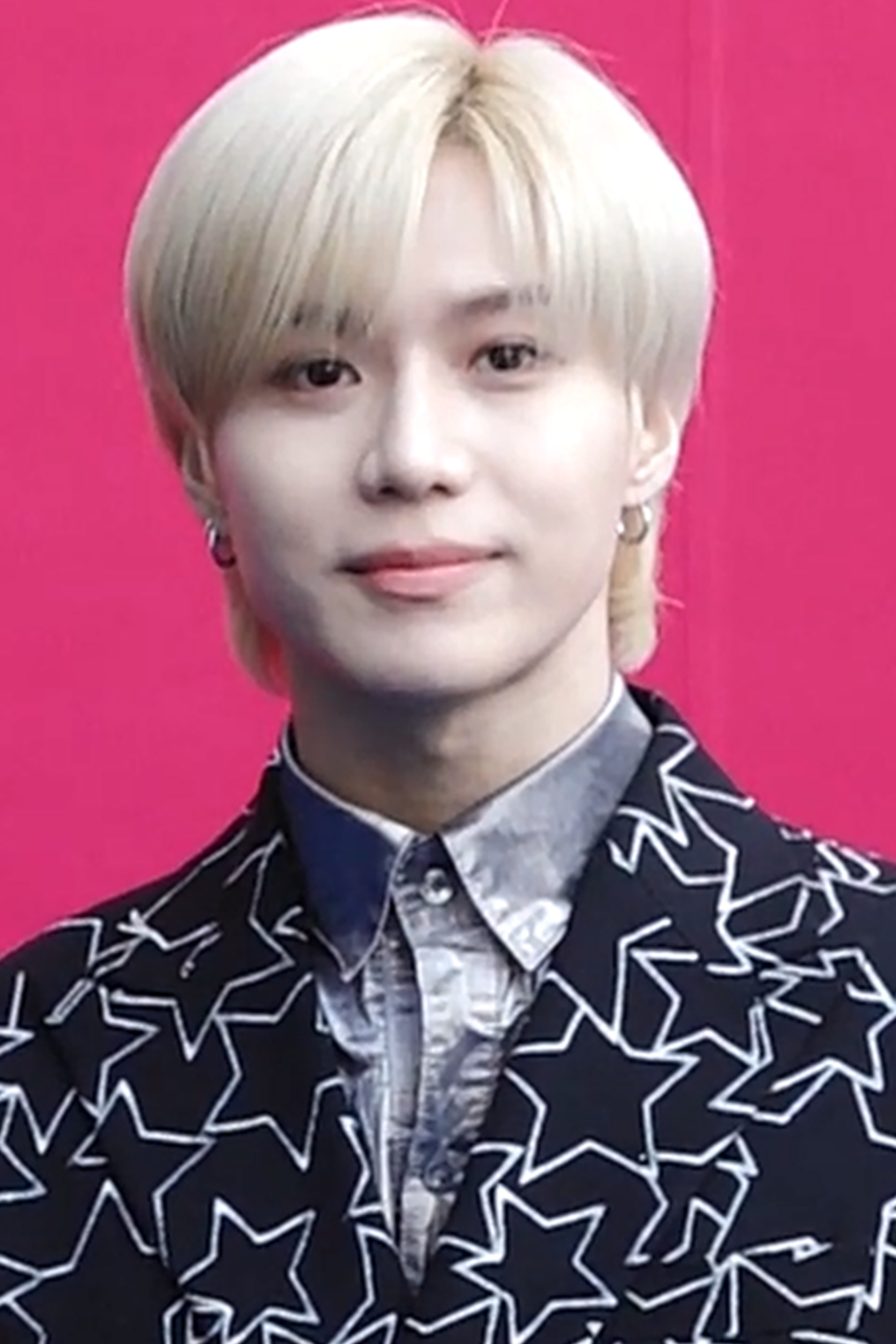
Suga of BTS (top left), Hwasa of Mamamoo (top right), Suho of Exo (bottom left) and Taemin of Shinee (bottom right) received their first Inkigayo awards as soloists with "Eight", "María", "Let's Love" and "Idea", with the former two earning a Triple Crown.

Key
†	Indicates the song achieved a Triple Crown
‡	Indicates the highest score of the year
—	No show was held

Chart history
Episode	Date	Artist	Song	Points	Ref.
1,029	January 5	Red Velvet	"Psycho" †	10,028	
1,030	January 12	Red Velvet	"Psycho" †	8,992	
1,031	January 19	Red Velvet	"Psycho" †	7,644	
—	January 26	Zico	"Any Song" †	7,038	
1,032	February 2	Zico	"Any Song" †	9,033	
1,033	February 9	Zico	"Any Song" †	8,464	
1,034	February 16	GFriend	"Crossroads"	5,999	
1,035	February 23	Noel	"Late Night"	5,864	
1,036	March 1	BTS	"On" †	7,393	
1,037	March 8	BTS	"On" †	10,627 ‡	
1,038	March 15	BTS	"On" †	9,682	
1,039	March 22	Itzy	"Wannabe" †	10,108	
1,040	March 29	Itzy	"Wannabe" †	9,315	
1,041	April 5	Itzy	"Wannabe" †	7,752	
1,042	April 12	Suho	"Let's Love"	5,707	
1,043	April 19	(G)I-dle	"Oh My God"	8,332	
1,044	April 26	Apink	"Dumhdurum"	9,103	
1,045	May 3	Apink	"Dumhdurum"	6,553	
1,046	May 10	Oh My Girl	"Nonstop"	9,737	
1,047	May 17	IU	"Eight" †	8,853	
1,048	May 24	IU	"Eight" †	8,834	
1,049	May 31	IU	"Eight" †	7,588	
1,050	June 7	Baekhyun	"Candy"	7,767	
1,051	June 14	Twice	"More & More"	10,558	
1,052	June 21	Twice	"More & More"	9,309	
1,053	June 28	Iz*One	"Secret Story of the Swan"	6,911	
1,054	July 5	Blackpink	"How You Like That" †	6,027	
1,055	July 12	Blackpink	"How You Like That" †	8,973	
1,056	July 19	Blackpink	"How You Like That" †	8,929	
1,057	July 26	Hwasa	"María" †	6,936	
1,058	August 2	Hwasa	"María" †	7,889	
1,059	August 9	Hwasa	"María" †	8,045	
1,060	August 16	(G)I-dle	"Dumdi Dumdi"	7,143	
1,061	August 23	(G)I-dle	"Dumdi Dumdi"	7,007	
1,062	August 30	BTS	"Dynamite" †	6,397	
1,063	September 6	BTS	"Dynamite" †	8,935	
1,064	September 13	BTS	"Dynamite" †	8,626	
1,065	September 20	Blackpink and Selena Gomez	"Ice Cream" †	6,484	
1,066	September 27	Blackpink and Selena Gomez	"Ice Cream" †	6,428	
—	October 4	Blackpink and Selena Gomez	"Ice Cream" †	6,267	
1,067	October 11	Blackpink	"Lovesick Girls" †	6,376	
1,068	October 18	Blackpink	"Lovesick Girls" †	10,239	
1,069	October 25	Blackpink	"Lovesick Girls" †	7,532	
—	November 1	Seventeen	"Home;Run"	6,889	
1,070	November 8	Twice	"I Can't Stop Me" † (Note: "I Can't Stop Me" achieved its third number one in 2021.)	7,460	
1,071	November 15	Twice	"I Can't Stop Me" †	6,965	
1,072	November 22	Taemin	"Idea"	5,911	
1,073	November 29	BTS	"Life Goes On" †	6,758	
1,074	December 6	BTS	"Life Goes On" †	10,234	
1,075	December 13	BTS	"Life Goes On" †	9,196	
—	December 20	Iz*One	"Panorama"	6,907	
—	December 27	Taeyeon	"What Do I Call You"	5,744	
