= Dynamite (BTS song) =

2020 single by BTS

- Cassette, digital single, Extended, and "NightTime" EP cover

Single by BTS
- Released: August 21, 2020
- Recorded: July 2020
- Studio: Dogg Bounce, South Korea; MixStar, Virginia Beach, Virginia, US; Sterling Sound, Edgewater, New Jersey, US
- Genre: Disco; pop
- Length: 3:19
- Label: Big Hit; Columbia; Sony Music
- Songwriters: David Stewart; Jessica Agombar
- Producer: David Stewart

BTS singles chronology
"Stay Gold" (2020)	"Dynamite" (2020)	"Savage Love (Laxed – Siren Beat) (BTS Remix)" (2020)

Alternative cover
- The 7-inch, CD, and "DayTime" EP cover

Music video
- "Dynamite" on YouTube "Dynamite" (B-side) on YouTube

"Dynamite" is a song recorded by South Korean boy band BTS, released on August 21, 2020, through Big Hit Entertainment and Sony Music Entertainment. It is the band's first song fully recorded in English. The song was written by David Stewart and Jessica Agombar and produced by Stewart. It has been described as an upbeat disco-pop song with elements of funk, soul, and bubblegum pop, and takes influence from 1970s music—it features snapping handclaps, echoing synths, and celebratory horns.

Intended to soothe listeners during the COVID-19 pandemic, the song talks about joy and appreciation for the little things that make life valuable. Upon release, "Dynamite" received positive reviews from music critics, with praise towards its catchiness and broadly appealing retro sound. It garnered the band their first Grammy nomination, for Best Pop Duo/Group Performance at 63rd Annual Grammy Awards, making them the first Korean pop act to be nominated for one.

"Dynamite" experienced large amounts of commercial success worldwide; it debuted at number one on the Billboard Hot 100 chart, becoming the band's first number-one single in the United States and making BTS the first all-South Korean act to top the Hot 100. The song sold 265,000 downloads in its first week, marking the biggest pure sales week since Taylor Swift's "Look What You Made Me Do" (2017). "Dynamite" stayed atop the Hot 100 for three total weeks. On Spotify, "Dynamite" debuted with 7.778 million streams, marking the biggest opening day for a song in 2020. Additionally, "Dynamite" peaked at number one on both the Billboard Global 200 and Billboard Global Excl. U.S. charts, topping the latter for three consecutive weeks. The song peaked within the top ten of the charts in 25 countries, including Australia, Canada, and the United Kingdom, and topped the charts in Hungary, Israel, Lithuania, Malaysia, Singapore, and South Korea. Its accompanying music video is the band's first to achieve 2 billion views on YouTube.

Initially a standalone single, "Dynamite" was later included on BTS's fifth Korean-language studio album, Be (2020), released on November 20.

== Recording ==
"Dynamite" is one of the few songs to which the members did not contribute in songwriting or production. In interviews with multiple media outlets, writers David Stewart and Jessica Agombar explained the song's creation. Through their publisher Tim Blacksmith at Stellar Songs, they learned that BTS was searching for an English language single. The duo wrote three songs over Zoom calls "at the start of lockdown." Stewart and Agombar wanted to create a song which was "energetic, fun, hopeful, positive and just like a huge ball of energy." Agombar disclosed how the song was conceived:

"It needs to be explosive" -- and obviously explosive then became "Dynamite." Any kind of word like that... I'm always thinking of fireworks, or "Firework," because I'm a massive Katy Perry fan. I just wanted anything high-energy. It wasn't a particular lyric, it was a bundle of ideas: explosive, fireworks, dynamite, party, fun, energetic, worldwide takeover. [...] So it just had to match the energy of everything surrounding BTS. It was less a line than a feeling. The BPM had to be quick, we have to have horns, it has to be uptempo.

Stellar Songs sent the track to Columbia's CEO Ron Perry and Big Hit in early April. BTS initially chose another song, before taking "Dynamite" two weeks later. The songs lyrics were tweaked alongside Jenna Andrews to make them more PG friendly. Stewart told E! Online that the group and labels "wanted to make sure it was quite neutral and not offensive" and that "There was a couple of rap references that might've been a bit more just like in your face and a bit more like, you know, ballsy that wasn't quite right for them". The song was ultimately recorded in mid-July.

== Lyrics and production ==
Dynamite
A 17-second sample of the chorus of "Dynamite", a disco-pop track that incorporates a funky bassline that goes with vocal harmonies, falsetto hooks and disco rhythm.

"Dynamite" is a 1970s-influenced disco-pop song with elements of funk, soul and bubblegum pop. Sheet music for the song shows a 4/4 common time in the key of E major with a tempo of 114 beats per minute. The vocal range spans from B_{3} to D♯_{5}. Instrumentation was provided by Stewart, who played drums, percussion, bass guitar, synth bass, synthesizers, pads, piano, electric guitars, programmed horns and programmed strings, and Johnny Thirkell, who played live horns. The upbeat production consists of "snapping" handclaps, bounces, grooves and "infectious" beats. The track features a funky bassline accompanied by vocal harmonies, falsetto hooks and a disco rhythm that is "ready-made for the dancefloor." It utilises "layered vocals, echo-y synth, and celebratory horns" to recreate the '70s retro sound.

The song opens with a snippet of the chorus, where Jung Kook sings, "'Cause I, I, I'm in the stars tonight/ So watch me bring the fire and set the night alight." Percussion and bass is added in the next section. It further builds with Nile Rodgers-esque guitar that is later boosted by "vibrant" brass sound. The chorus is "unifying" and gains speed as the song progresses. Craig Jenkins of Vulture compared the horns in the chorus to that of Neon Genesis Evangelion's theme song, "A Cruel Angel's Thesis" (1995) and described "Dynamite" as "a vehicle expressly designed to break through the stratosphere", noting its similarity in genre to the handful of other disco-influenced songs that reached number one on the US Billboard Hot 100 earlier that year (namely Doja Cat's "Say So", Harry Styles' "Watermelon Sugar", and Lady Gaga and Ariana Grande's "Rain on Me"). Pitchfork's Noah Yoo compared the song musically to Taio Cruz's 2010 song of the same name. The last two verses of the track introduce a change in the key. Speaking about the meaning of the song in a press conference, Suga stated that "Dynamite" has a "message of confidence and happiness. It's like after you fell on the ground, you're trying to get back up again. That's what this song is like." In an interview with Zane Lowe of Apple Music, RM said the song is "made of positive vibes, energy, hope, love, the purity, everything." Lyrically, the song talks about the joy and appreciation of little things that makes life valuable. The lyrics also include several pop cultural references including King Kong, The Rolling Stones and basketball star LeBron James. Alyssa Bailey of Elle interpreted the lyrics as "a much-needed burst of joy and invitation to join them, dance, and be a light, even when the world seems a little dark".

== Release ==
On July 26, 2020, the band confirmed during a live stream on V Live that they would be releasing an English-language song on August 21, 2020, as the first single for their upcoming album. Discussing the song, which was one of their most heavily promoted releases thus far, the band said that "due to COVID-19, people around the world have been going through tough times and we wanted to share some positive energy with our fans". One day after the news, a website displaying seven countdowns went live, each one corresponding to a new announcement for the single. On July 31, the group shared a pre-save link for Spotify. On August 2, Big Hit revealed that the title of the song would be "Dynamite". The following day, pre-orders went live for 7-inch and cassette editions of the song, as well as the digital single and its instrumental for US customers; the physical versions sold out within an hour. The next day, the band shared a promotion schedule revealing two music video releases, three interviews with American networks and a performance at the 2020 MTV Video Music Awards. EDM and acoustic remixes were released on August 24. Additional tropical and poolside remixes were released on August 28. Four new remixes of the song, "Slow Jam", "Midnight", "Retro", and "Bedroom", were released simultaneously on September 18. A special "Holiday Remix" version of the single was released on December 11 as a thank-you to fans for their support of the song and its achievements.

== Critical reception ==
Professional ratings
Review scores
Source	Rating
IZM	2.5/5 stars

"Dynamite" was met with mostly positive reviews from music critics upon release, with emphasis on its catchiness and broadly appealing retro sound. The New York Times included the song in their playlist of thirteen songs of its release week, with music critic Jon Caramanica writing that although it was "less musically adventurous than the songs that made the group a worldwide phenomenon, it relies on brightness, exuberance and relentless good cheer." He further likened its musical style to the works of Jamiroquai and Charlie Puth. Mike Wass of Idolator deemed the track "a stone-cold smash" with "one of the catchiest choruses of 2020." Yoo felt that the song "yearns to fit the Western pop music canon while also slyly sending it up." He praised the beat as "polished" and the hook as "memorable" in which "each member gets a moment to shine." He also compared the track to Bruno Mars' "Uptown Funk" (2014) and labelled it as "a self-aware pop song that's about nothing but itself." Similarly, Jenkins found the track's "cute, catchy, unassuming mass entertainment" akin to "Uptown Funk" and Katy Perry's songs from her 2010 album, Teenage Dream. Reviewing for the Los Angeles Times, Laura Zornosa opined that the song is "soaked in color and nostalgia" and acclaimed it for having "all the ingredients for a summer success" by fusing "the novelty of 'Old Town Road' with the international flair of 'I Like It' and 'Despacito' and all the sunny hype of 'Can't Stop the Feeling!'" She also dubbed the chorus an "earworm" and the lyrics as "relatable." Tim Chan of Rolling Stone regarded it as "bright and breezy" track which he felt was "one of the poppiest songs the group has released to date" and praised the song for its sound, production, "uplifting" chorus and commercial appeal. The publication later included the song on its 2021 revised list of the 500 Greatest Songs of All Time at number 346, and called it "a landmark, hegemony-shattering moment for the world-conquering group".

Patrick Hosken of MTV praised the track and wrote, "the song itself is a blockbuster, not because it's overstuffed with ideas but because it's light and airy and, crucially, feels like summer." Rhian Daly of NME stated the song "mines the bright, infectious sounds of disco to get its joyful energy across, sticking to the genre's tradition of serving as a form of escapism when life gets hard." Tom Breihan from Stereogum praised the sound and regarded the song as "classic boy-band pop." Aamina Khan of Vogue compared it to their previous single "Boy with Luv" (2019) and praised the pop sound calling it "a welcome summer wind-down." Robin Murray of Clash cited it as an "up-front return" and highlighted the "glossy" production, adding that it "showcases each member's ability, bringing it all together as a seamless whole." Billboard's Jason Lipshutz described it as "an effervescent piece of pop" that is "filled with radio-friendly highlights." He was impressed by the "late key change" and the "sing-along bridge," and called the song "one of its biggest hits to date." P. Claire Dodson of Teen Vogue regarded the track as a "lighthearted, energetic pop that proves yet again the dexterity they possess with sound and aesthetic" which was "precisely for that energy" and viewed it as "a shift from the overall arc" of their previous album, Map of the Soul: 7. Similarly, Marty Rosenbaum from Radio.com praised the instant appeal of the song and called it "explosive." Douglas Greenwood of i-D magazine also enjoyed the single and listed it as one of the best songs of its release week. Ellie Bate of BuzzFeed called the song "upbeat, poppy, full of rainbow colors and sweetness" and "an undeniably happy and upbeat disco track, with both lyrics and choreography paying homage to musical legends like the Rolling Stones, Michael Jackson, and Elvis Presley."

"Dynamite" on critic lists
Publication	List	Rank	Ref.
Billboard	The 100 Best Songs of 2020	7	
Consequence of Sound	Top 50 Songs of 2020	3	
IZM	Top 10 Pop Singles of 2020	Included	
Los Angeles Times	The 50 best songs of 2020	Included	
Melon	Top 100 K-pop Songs of All Time	4	
Music Y	Top 10 Songs of 2020	2	
NME	The 50 best songs of 2020	40	
NPR	The 100 Best Songs Of 2020	100	
The New York Times	Best Songs of 2020	2	
Rolling Stone	The 50 Best Songs of 2020	7	
Rolling Stone	Rolling Stone's 500 Greatest Songs of All Time	346	
Uproxx	The Best Songs of 2020	22	

== Music video ==
The music video for "Dynamite" was preceded by a 28-second long video teaser which was published to Big Hit's official YouTube channel on August 18. The short clip showed scenes of the band in pastel-colored clothes with a sunset sky behind them, as well as them dancing to a "cheerful disco melody" in retro-styled outfits against the backdrop of a large "Disco" sign. The audio featured a "funky bass line and horns" and showcased the song's "upbeat" and "boundless" energy.

BTS pays homage to Michael Jackson throughout the music video, which features poses and dance moves reminiscent of the late's singer signature style.

On August 20, a live countdown started at 11:30 PM EST on Big Hit's YouTube channel, half an hour before the music video's release. When the video premiered at 12:00 AM EST, it garnered over 3 million peak concurrent viewers, surpassing previous record holder Blackpink's 1.66 million concurrents for "How You Like That" in June, and setting a new all-time record for the biggest music video premiere on the platform. It became the fastest YouTube video to reach 10 million views, after only 20 minutes of release, and the most viewed YouTube video in the first 24 hours, earning 101.1 million views and setting three new Guinness World Records. The music video is the fastest in YouTube history to cross the 200 million mark, in just four days and twelve hours after release, and the fastest by a music group to surpass 400 million views, doing so on September 26, 35 days after release. It is the fastest music video by both a group and an Asian act to achieve 500 million views—59 days after release—and the fastest by a Korean artist to cross 600 million views, doing so on November 16 in just under 27 days. On December 17, "Dynamite" surpassed 700 million views, achieving the mark in under four months. It became the fastest music video by a Korean group to achieve to 800 and 900 million views, when it crossed the former five months after release in January 2021, and the latter 40 days later. The video is BTS' fastest to reach 1 billion views; (Note: on April 12, 2021, in just under eight months) their third, after "DNA" and "Boy with Luv"; and the fastest by a Korean artist to do so. In September 2025, it became their first music video to cross 2 billion views.

A B-side version of the music video, filmed on the same set as the original "but with different angles and a few amusing bloopers", was released on August 24 and showed "[BTS] having fun together in joyful vibes". A choreography only version of the original music video premiered during online video game Fortnite's Battle Royale on September 25—a "BTS Dynamite Pack" featuring two emotes with moves like the band was made available for in-game purchase from September 23, two days prior to the event. This version crossed 100 million views on January 30, 2021, becoming BTS' 29th music video to do so and further extending the band's record as the Korean artist with the most music videos exceeding 100 million views.

== Commercial performance ==
"Dynamite" debuted at number six on the Gaon Digital Chart in South Korea, with two days of tracking. The following week, it rose to the top spot, making it BTS's seventh number-one in the country, and the second in 2020 after "On". The song remained at the top position for seven consecutive weeks, tying with Zico's "Any Song" for the longest running number one song on the chart. On the chart issue dated October 31, "Dynamite" regained its number one spot and remained at the top spot for a further three weeks, tallying a total of 11 non-consecutive weeks atop the chart. The song also topped the component download and streaming charts, spending 11 weeks atop the latter. "Dynamite" was the best-performing song of September and October 2020 in South Korea, based on digital sales, streaming, and background music (instrumental track) downloads. In Japan, the song debuted at number seven on the Billboard Japan Hot 100, peaking at number two, three weeks after. The song reached number one on Billboard Japan's Streaming Songs chart on the issue dated September 7, 2020, with over 10 million streams. In its 11th week, the song surpassed 100 million cumulative streams, becoming the fastest song in history to do so and only the second song by a foreign artist in Japan after Ed Sheeran's "Shape of You" (2016). The song exceeded 250,000 downloads in 2021 and was awarded platinum certification by the Recording Industry Association of Japan (RIAJ) that February. On the UK Singles Chart, "Dynamite" debuted at number three, representing the band's most successful single in the territory, surpassing the peak of "Boy with Luv" (2019) at number 13. In January 2021, OCC reported that "Dynamite" was the 15th best-selling song of 2020 in the UK.

=== United States ===
In the United States, "Dynamite" debuted atop the Billboard Hot 100, becoming BTS' first number-one single there and their fourth top-ten entry. The group became the first all-South Korean act in Hot 100 history to debut at number one and the first Asian act to chart a number-one song in the country since Kyu Sakamoto with "Sukiyaki" in 1963. The song sold 300,000 units in its first week, including downloads and physical—vinyl and cassette—versions. It earned 33.9 million total US on-demand streams and 11.6 million radio impressions. "Dynamite" also debuted atop the Billboard Digital Song Sales chart, selling 265,000 downloads and marking the biggest pure sales week since "Look What You Made Me Do" by Taylor Swift launched with 353,000 downloads in 2017. Supported by subsequent "Poolside", "Tropical", EDM, and acoustic remixes, as well as an instrumental version, "Dynamite" sold a further 182,000 units in its second week and remained atop the Hot 100. It became the 20th song, of 43 that have entered the chart at number one, to debut at number one and spend its first two weeks atop the chart since a mid-90's rules change allowed songs to debut at number one; it is the first song by a group to accomplish this since Aerosmith's "I Don't Want to Miss a Thing" in 1998. In its fifth week on the chart, "Dynamite" returned to the top spot the Hot 100 for a third week at number-one, aided by its "Bedroom," "Midnight," "Retro" and "Slow Jam" remixes, which together accounted for 52% of the overall song sales of 153,000 copies that week. "Dynamite" entered the Pop Songs chart at number 30 on the issue dated August 29, 2020, becoming the band's sixth entry on the ranking. On the week of November 7, it reached the ninth position, becoming their first top ten on the chart, and also the highest-charting song by a Korean act, besting Psy's "Gangnam Style" (2012). In January 2021, Billboard announced that "Dynamite" was the number one selling single in the US of 2020, and the only song to exceed 1 million downloads. It sold a total of 1.3 million copies across all formats according to Nielsen Music's annual year-end report. The margin was so significant that it surpassed the second best-selling song, "Blinding Lights" by The Weeknd, which sold 580,000 copies, by a factor of more than 2.2.

Following the 63rd Annual Grammy Awards on March 14, 2021, Billboard reported a surge in sales of all songs performed on the show for that day. "Dynamite" sold an additional 10,500 copies—a 2,748% increase—and was the top-selling track of the night. The song returned to number one on the Digital Songs chart for that week and the next—its 15th and 16th non-consecutive weeks in the lead—with 27,880 and 26,700 copies sold respectively, tying with "Old Town Road" by Lil Nas X in week 16 for the second most weeks atop the ranking. The single became BTS's fourth to achieve platinum status in the US and their first to receive double-platinum certification from the Recording Industry Association of America (RIAA), doing so on March 17. On March 29, "Dynamite" tied "Despacito"'s record for the most weeks at number one on the Digital Songs chart, when it topped the issue dated April 3 for a record-extending 17th week with 43,000 copies sold. On the Hot 100 issue of the same date, the single spent its 31st consecutive week inside the top 50, tying with "Gangnam Style" as the longest-charting songs by a Korean artist there. The following week, Dynamite became both the longest-running number one on the Digital Songs chart and the longest-charting song by a Korean artist on the Hot 100 respectively, when it spent its 18th non-consecutive week atop the former, with over 37,600 copies sold and its 32nd week on the latter, on the issues dated April 10, 2021.

=== Worldwide ===
With 7.778 million first-day streams globally, "Dynamite" surpassed Taylor Swift's "Cardigan" (7.742 million streams) as the biggest song debut of 2020 on Spotify. During the inaugural week of the Billboard Global 200 which tracks the most streamed and digitally sold songs in over 200 territories, and the Billboard Global Excl. U.S. which tracks the same metrics excluding the US, "Dynamite" launched at number two on both the charts, blocked from reaching the top spot by Cardi B's "WAP" and Maluma's "Hawai", respectively. The following week, the song climbed to number one on the Global Excl. U.S. chart with 67.4 million streams and 18,000 downloads sold in territories outside the US. In its third week, "Dynamite" reached number one on the Global 200 chart with 92.1 million global streams and 58,000 global downloads sold, becoming the most-streamed and most-sold song globally. The single topped the Global Excl. U.S. chart for a second consecutive week, becoming the first song to top both charts simultaneously. It spent a record four and eight weeks on top of the Global 200 and Global Excl. U.S. charts respectively.

In March 2021, the International Federation of the Phonographic Industry (IFPI) published its annual top-10 charts for the previous year and listed "Dynamite" as the 10th best-selling digital single of 2020 globally, having amassed 1.28 billion subscription stream equivalents worldwide in less than five months.

== Live performances ==
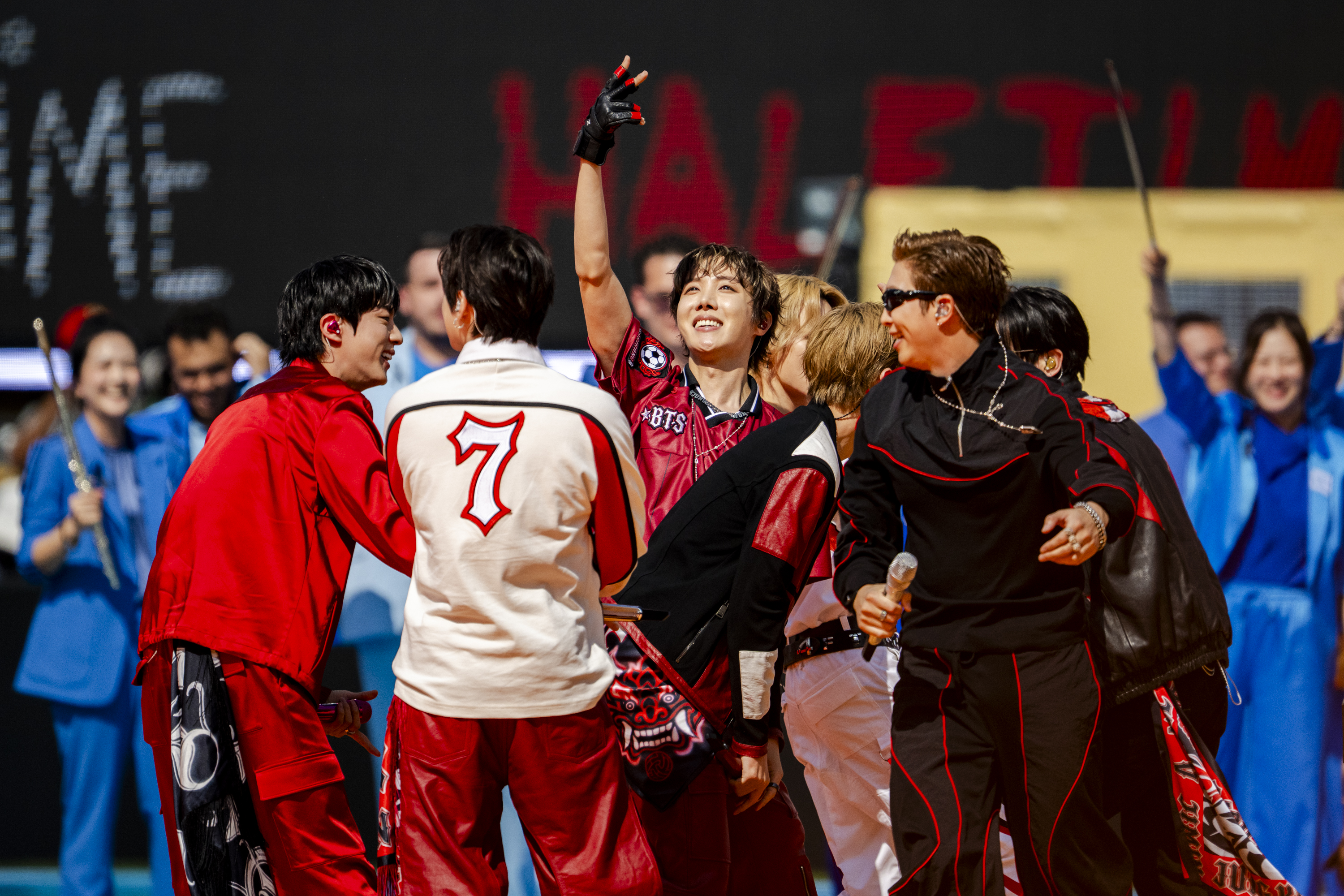
BTS performing "Dynamite" at the 2026 FIFA World Cup final halftime show

BTS first performed "Dynamite" at the 2020 MTV Video Music Awards on August 30, 2020. They followed that up with additional performances on the Today Show on September 10, America's Got Talent on September 16, and as the closing act at the iHeartRadio Music Festival on September 18—the band opened their four-song set with the track. BTS made their first ever appearance on NPR's Tiny Desk Concerts on September 21, also opening their three-song set with "Dynamite". During the first of the band's week-long stint on NBC's The Tonight Show Starring Jimmy Fallon that began on September 28, BTS presented a pre-recorded performance of the song that featured both Jimmy Fallon and the Roots. They performed it from Terminal 2 of Incheon International Airport for the 2020 Billboard Music Awards in October, at the Seoul Olympic Stadium for the 2020 American Music Awards in November, and as the closer for their appearance on MTV Unplugged in February 2021. In March 2021, they performed "Dynamite" from the roof of a skyscraper in Seoul for the 63rd Annual Grammy Awards, becoming the first Korean pop act to perform their own song at the Grammys. BTS performed "Dynamite" at the 2026 FIFA World Cup final halftime show at MetLife Stadium in East Rutherford, New Jersey.

== Track listing ==
- 7-inch
1. "Dynamite" – 3:19
- Cassette

A-side

1. "Dynamite" – 3:19

B-side

1. "Dynamite" – 3:19
- CD
1. "Dynamite" – 3:19
2. "Dynamite" (Instrumental) – 3:18
3. "Dynamite" (Acoustic Remix) – 3:17
4. "Dynamite" (EDM Remix) – 3:18
5. "Dynamite" (Tropical Remix) – 3:17
6. "Dynamite" (Poolside Remix) – 3:03
7. "Dynamite" (Slow Jam Remix) – 3:19
8. "Dynamite" (Midnight Remix) – 3:16
9. "Dynamite" (Bedroom Remix) – 3:27
10. "Dynamite" (Retro Remix) – 3:28
- Digital
1. "Dynamite" – 3:19
2. "Dynamite" (Instrumental) – 3:18
- Digital EP (Extended)
1. "Dynamite" – 3:19
2. "Dynamite" (Instrumental) – 3:18
3. "Dynamite" (Acoustic Remix) – 3:17
4. "Dynamite" (EDM Remix) – 3:18
- Digital EP (DayTime Version)
1. "Dynamite" – 3:19
2. "Dynamite" (Instrumental) – 3:18
3. "Dynamite" (Acoustic Remix) – 3:17
4. "Dynamite" (EDM Remix) – 3:18
5. "Dynamite" (Tropical Remix) – 3:17
6. "Dynamite" (Poolside Remix) – 3:03
- Digital EP (NightTime Version)
1. "Dynamite" – 3:19
2. "Dynamite" (Instrumental) – 3:18
3. "Dynamite" (Slow Jam Remix) – 3:19
4. "Dynamite" (Midnight Remix) – 3:16
5. "Dynamite" (Retro Remix) – 3:28
6. "Dynamite" (Bedroom Remix) – 3:27
- Digital single (Holiday Remix)
1. "Dynamite" (Holiday Remix) – 3:33

== Credits and personnel ==
Credits adapted from Tidal and NetEase Music.

- BTS – primary vocals
- David Stewart – production, songwriting, drums, percussion, bass guitar, synth bass, synths, pads, piano, electric guitars, programmed horns, programmed strings, background vocals
- Jessica Agombar – songwriting
- Johnny Thirkell – live horns
- Pdogg – recording engineering
- Jenna Andrews – vocal production
- Juan "Saucy" Peña – vocal engineering
- Serban Ghenea – mix engineering
- John Hanes – assistant mix engineering
- Chris Gehringer – mastering

== Charts ==
=== Weekly charts ===
2020–2022 weekly chart performance for "Dynamite"
Chart (2020–2022)	Peak position
Argentina Hot 100 (Billboard)	10
Australia (ARIA)	2
Austria (Ö3 Austria Top 40)	9
Belgium (Ultratop 50 Flanders)	5
Belgium (Ultratop 50 Wallonia)	3
Bolivia Airplay (Monitor Latino)	7
Brazil Airplay (Top 100 Brasil)	35
Canada Hot 100 (Billboard)	2
Canada CHR/Top 40 (Billboard)	7
Canada Hot AC (Billboard)	17
Colombia Airplay (National-Report)	44
Colombia Streaming (Promúsica)	9
Costa Rica Anglo Airplay (Monitor Latino)	9
Croatia International Airplay (Top lista)	17
Czech Republic Singles Digital (ČNS IFPI)	9
Denmark (Tracklisten)	26
El Salvador Airplay (Monitor Latino)	12
Estonia (Eesti Tipp-40)	2
Euro Digital Song Sales (Billboard)	1
Finland (Suomen virallinen lista)	13
France (SNEP)	18
Germany (GfK)	8
Global 200 (Billboard)	1
Greece International (IFPI)	10
Guatemala Anglo (Monitor Latino)	6
Hungary (Rádiós Top 40)	19
Hungary (Single Top 40)	1
Hungary (Stream Top 40)	10
Iceland (Tónlistinn)	21
India International Singles (IMI)	8
Ireland (IRMA)	6
Israel (Media Forest)	1
Italy (FIMI)	12
Japan Hot 100 (Billboard)	2
Japan Combined Singles (Oricon)	2
Lebanon (Lebanese Top 20)	12
Lithuania (AGATA)	1
Malaysia (RIM)	1
Mexico Airplay (Billboard)	1
Netherlands (Dutch Top 40)	8
Netherlands (Single Top 100)	20
New Zealand (Recorded Music NZ)	4
Norway (VG-lista)	20
Panama (Monitor Latino)	6
Peru Anglo (Monitor Latino)	1
Poland Airplay (ZPAV)	18
Portugal (AFP)	21
Romania (Airplay 100)	47
Russia Airplay (TopHit)	3
San Marino Airplay (SMRTV Top 50)	25
Scottish Singles Sales (Official Charts)	1
Singapore (RIAS)	1
Slovakia Airplay (ČNS IFPI)	34
Slovakia Singles Digital (ČNS IFPI)	7
Slovenia Airplay (SloTop50)	8
South Korea (Gaon)	1
South Korea (K-pop Hot 100)	1
Spain (PROMUSICAE)	38
Sweden (Sverigetopplistan)	19
Switzerland (Schweizer Hitparade)	4
UK Singles (Official Charts)	3
UK Indie (Official Charts)	1
Uruguay Anglo (Monitor Latino)	5
US Billboard Hot 100	1
US Adult Contemporary (Billboard)	16
US Adult Pop Airplay (Billboard)	10
US Dance Airplay (Billboard)	16
US Pop Airplay (Billboard)	5
US Rolling Stone Top 100	2
Venezuela Anglo Airplay (Record Report)	2
Venezuela Pop Airplay (Record Report)	15
Vietnam (Vietnam Hot 100)	2
Wales (Official Charts)	1

2026 weekly chart performance
Chart (2026)	Peak position
Panama Streaming (PRODUCE)	126
Russia Streaming (TopHit)	94

Acoustic Remix
Chart (2020)	Peak position
South Korea (Gaon)	178

Holiday Remix
Chart (2020)	Peak position
South Korea (Gaon)	110

=== Monthly charts ===
Monthly chart performance for "Dynamite"
Chart (2020)	Peak position
Brazil (Pro-Música Brasil)	26
Paraguay (SGP)	51
South Korea (Gaon)	1

=== Year-end charts ===
2020 year-end chart performance for "Dynamite"
Chart (2020)	Position
Argentina Airplay (Monitor Latino)	43
Australia (ARIA)	96
Belgium (Ultratop Flanders)	67
Canada (Canadian Hot 100)	73
CIS (Tophit)	84
Hungary (Single Top 40)	14
Hungary (Stream Top 40)	49
Japan (Japan Hot 100)	18
Japan Streaming (Oricon)	7
Netherlands (Dutch Top 40)	70
Netherlands (Single Top 100)	91
Russia Airplay (Tophit)	87
South Korea (Gaon)	11
Switzerland (Schweizer Hitparade)	94
US Billboard Hot 100	38
US Mainstream Top 40 (Billboard)	45
Worldwide (IFPI)	10

2021 year-end chart performance for "Dynamite"
Chart (2021)	Position
Australia (ARIA)	79
Belgium (Ultratop Flanders)	71
Belgium (Ultratop Wallonia)	79
Canada (Canadian Hot 100)	75
France (SNEP)	181
Global 200 (Billboard)	5
Hungary (Single Top 40)	77
India International Singles (IMI)	9
Italy (FIMI)	100
Japan (Japan Hot 100)	2
Japan Combined Singles (Oricon)	4
Portugal (AFP)	121
South Korea (Gaon)	3
US Billboard Hot 100	41
US Adult Top 40 (Billboard)	43

2022 year-end chart performance for "Dynamite"
Chart (2022)	Position
Global 200 (Billboard)	40
Japan (Japan Hot 100)	14
South Korea (Circle)	39
Vietnam (Vietnam Hot 100)	22

2023 year-end chart performance for "Dynamite"
Chart (2023)	Position
Japan (Japan Hot 100)	86
South Korea (Circle)	55

2024 year-end chart performance for "Dynamite"
Chart (2024)	Position
South Korea (Circle)	82

=== All-time charts ===
All-time chart performance for "Dynamite"
Chart (2008–2022)	Position
Japan (Japan Hot 100)	6

== Accolades ==
At the 63rd Annual Grammy Awards, "Dynamite" garnered BTS their first-ever Grammy nomination for Best Pop Duo/Group Performance—the band is the first Korean act to be recognized by the Recording Academy. The song won five consecutive weekly Melon Popularity awards from September 9–28, and also achieved a record 32 music show wins in South Korea.

Key
†	Indicates a formerly held world record

World records for "Dynamite"
Year	Organization	Award	Ref.
2020	Guinness World Records	† Most viewed YouTube video in 24 hours	
2020	Guinness World Records	† Most viewed YouTube music video in 24 hours	
2020	Guinness World Records	† Most viewed YouTube music video in 24 hours by a K-pop group	
2020	Guinness World Records	† Most simultaneous viewers for a music video on YouTube	
2020	Guinness World Records	† Most viewers for the premiere of a video on YouTube	
2021	Guinness World Records	Most weeks on the US Hot 100 by a K-pop track	
2021	Guinness World Records	Most weeks at No.1 on Billboard's Digital Song Sales Chart	

Awards and nominations for "Dynamite"
Year	Organization	Award	Result	Ref.
2020	Asia Artist Awards	Song of the Year	Won	
2020	Genie Music Awards	Best Single – Dance	Won	
2020	Japan Record Awards	International Music Award	Won	
2020	Melon Music Awards	Best Dance – Male	Won	
2020	Melon Music Awards	Song of the Year	Won	
2020	Mnet Asian Music Awards	Best Dance Performance – Male Group	Won	
2020	Mnet Asian Music Awards	Best Music Video	Won	
2020	Mnet Asian Music Awards	Song of the Year	Won	
2020	MTV Europe Music Awards	Best Song	Won	
2020	MTV Europe Music Awards	Best Pop	Nominated	
2020	MTV Video Music Awards Japan	Best Group Video – International	Won	
2020	MTV Video Music Awards Japan	Video of the Year	Nominated	
2020	People's Choice Awards	Song of 2020	Won	
2020	People's Choice Awards	Music Video of 2020	Won	
2020	Joox Malaysia Top Music Awards	Top 5 Hits: K-Pop(Year End 2020)	Won	
2020	Joox Malaysia Top Music Awards	Top 5 Hits of the Year: K-Pop	Won	
2021	Billboard Music Awards	Top Selling Song	Won	
2021	BMI London Awards	Most Performed Songs of the year	Won	
2021	Gaon Chart Music Awards	Song of the Year – August	Won	
2021	Golden Disc Awards	Best Digital Song (Bonsang)	Won	
2021	Golden Disc Awards	Digital Daesang	Nominated	
2021	Grammy Awards	Best Pop Duo/Group Performance	Nominated	
2021	Hito Music Awards	Western Song of the year	Won	
2021	iHeartRadio Music Awards	Best Music Video	Won	
2021	iHeartRadio Music Awards	Favourite Music Video Choreography	Won	
2021	Japan Gold Disc Awards	Best 5 Songs by Streaming	Won	
2021	Japan Gold Disc Awards	Song of the Year by Download	Won	
2021	Japan Gold Disc Awards	Song of the Year by Streaming	Won	
2021	Joox Indonesia Music Awards	Global Song of the Year	Won	
2021	Kids' Choice Awards	Favourite Song	Won	
2021	Korean Music Awards	Best Pop Song	Won	
2021	Korean Music Awards	Song of the Year	Won	
2021	MTV Video Music Awards	Song of the Year	Nominated	
2021	Myx Music Awards	Favorite International Video	Won	
2021	Rockbjörnen	Foreign Song of the Year	Won	
2021	RTHK International Pop Poll Awards	Top ten International Gold Songs	Won	
2021	Seoul Music Awards	Best Song	Won	
2022	BMI Pop Awards	Most Performed Songs of the year	Won	
2022	Gaon Chart Music Awards	Music Steady Seller of the Year	Won	
2022	JASRAC Awards	Foreign Work Award (Note: awarded for 2021)	Won	
2022	KOMCA Awards	Song of the Year	Won	
2025	Music Awards Japan	Best K-pop Song in Japan	Nominated	

Music program awards for "Dynamite"
Program	Date (32 total)	Ref.
Show! Music Core	August 29, 2020	
Show! Music Core	September 5, 2020	
Show! Music Core	September 12, 2020	
Show! Music Core	September 19, 2020	
Show! Music Core	September 26, 2020	
Show! Music Core	October 10, 2020	
Show! Music Core	October 17, 2020	
Show! Music Core	October 31, 2020	
Show! Music Core	November 7, 2020	
Show! Music Core	November 14, 2020	
Inkigayo	August 30, 2020	
Inkigayo	September 6, 2020	
Inkigayo	September 13, 2020	
Show Champion	September 2, 2020	
Show Champion	September 9, 2020	
Show Champion	September 16, 2020	
Music Bank	September 4, 2020	
Music Bank	September 11, 2020	
Music Bank	September 18, 2020	
Music Bank	September 25, 2020	
Music Bank	October 2, 2020	
Music Bank	October 9, 2020	
Music Bank	November 13, 2020	
Music Bank	November 20, 2020	
Music Bank	November 27, 2020	
Music Bank	December 4, 2020	
Music Bank	December 11, 2020	
Music Bank	December 25, 2020	
Music Bank	January 1, 2021	
Music Bank	January 8, 2021	
Music Bank	February 26, 2021	
Music Bank	March 5, 2021	

== Certifications and sales ==
Certifications and sales for "Dynamite"
Region	Certification	Certified units/sales
Australia (ARIA)	2× Platinum	140,000^{‡}
Belgium (BRMA)	Platinum	40,000^{‡}
Canada (Music Canada)	7× Platinum	560,000^{‡}
Denmark (IFPI Danmark)	Gold	45,000^{‡}
France (SNEP)	Diamond	333,333^{‡}
Germany (BVMI)	Gold	200,000^{‡}
Italy (FIMI)	2× Platinum	140,000^{‡}
Japan (RIAJ)	2× Platinum	500,000^{*}
Mexico (AMPROFON)	Gold	30,000^{‡}
New Zealand (RMNZ)	3× Platinum	90,000^{‡}
Poland (ZPAV)	Platinum	20,000^{‡}
Portugal (AFP)	Platinum	10,000^{‡}
Spain (Promusicae)	2× Platinum	120,000^{‡}
United Kingdom (BPI)	Platinum	600,000^{‡}
United States (RIAA)	5× Platinum	5,000,000^{‡}
Streaming
Greece (IFPI Greece)	Gold	1,000,000^{†}
Japan (RIAJ)	Diamond	500,000,000^{†}
South Korea (KMCA)	3× Platinum	300,000,000^{†}
^{*} Sales figures based on certification alone.^{‡} Sales+streaming figures based on certification alone.^{†} Streaming-only figures based on certification alone.

== Release history ==
Release dates and formats for "Dynamite"
Country	Date	Format(s)	Version	Label	Ref.
Various	August 21, 2020	Digital download; streaming	Original	Big Hit	
United States	August 21, 2020	7-inch; cassette single	Original	Columbia	
Australia	August 21, 2020	Contemporary hit radio	Original	Sony Australia	
Various	August 24, 2020	Digital download; streaming	Remixes	Big Hit	
United States	August 25, 2020	Contemporary hit radio	Original	Columbia	
Various	August 28, 2020	Digital download; streaming	Remixes	Big Hit	
Italy	September 4, 2020	Contemporary hit radio	Original	Sony	
United States	September 14, 2020	Hot/Modern/AC radio	Original	Columbia	
Various	September 18, 2020	Digital download; streaming	Remixes	Big Hit	
United States	November 20, 2020	CD	Original/ Remixes	Columbia	
Various	December 11, 2020	Digital download; streaming	Holiday Remix	Big Hit	
Japan	February 26, 2021	7-inch; cassette single	Original	Universal Music Japan	

== Legacy ==
To test the experimental system of the "space Internet", Danuri (Korea Pathfinder Lunar Orbiter) successfully forwarded a number of photos taken, as well as several video files, including, BTS's "Dynamite" from outer space to Earth at Korea's Ministry of Science and ICT, Korea Aerospace Research Institute (KARI), and the Electronics and Telecommunications Research Institute (ETRI) on November 7, 2022.

=== Cover versions ===
American a cappella group Pentatonix performed a cover of the song in a mash-up released on August 17, 2021, which also included "Butter". The song was performed in season 2, episode 1 of the sitcom Emily in Paris performed by the character of Mindy while singing in a Paris cabaret.

== See also ==
- List of airplay number-one hits in Argentina
- List of Billboard Argentina Hot 100 top-ten singles in 2020
- List of Billboard Digital Song Sales number ones of 2020
- List of Billboard Digital Song Sales number ones of 2021
- List of Billboard Global 200 number ones of 2020
- List of Billboard Global 200 number ones of 2021
- List of Billboard Hot 100 number ones of 2020
- List of Billboard Hot 100 number-one singles of the 2020s
- List of Billboard Hot 100 top-ten singles in 2020
- List of Gaon Digital Chart number ones of 2020
- List of Inkigayo Chart winners (2020)
- List of most-liked YouTube videos
- List of Music Bank Chart winners (2020)
- List of Music Bank Chart winners (2021)
- List of number-one songs of 2020 (Malaysia)
- List of number-one songs of 2020 (Singapore)
- List of Show! Music Core Chart winners (2020)
- List of top 10 singles in 2020 (Australia)
- List of top 10 singles in 2020 (Ireland)
- List of UK top-ten singles in 2020
- List of UK Independent Singles Chart number ones of 2020
