= I Can't Stop Me =

2020 single by Twice

- English version cover

Single by Twice

from the album Eyes Wide Open
- Language: Korean
- Released: October 26, 2020
- Studio: JYPE Studios (Seoul)
- Genre: Synthwave; pop
- Length: 3:25
- Label: JYP; Republic
- Composers: A Wright; Melanie Joy Fontana; Michel "Lindgren" Schulz
- Lyricists: J. Y. Park "The Asiansoul"; Shim Eun-ji

Twice singles chronology
"Fanfare" (2020)	"I Can't Stop Me" (2020)	"Better" (2020)

Music video
- "I Can't Stop Me" on YouTube

"I Can't Stop Me" (stylized in all caps) is a song recorded by South Korean girl group Twice, for their second Korean-language studio album, Eyes Wide Open (2020). It was released on October 26, 2020, through JYP Entertainment and Republic Records, as the album's lead single. As the opening track of the album, the song's lyrics were written by Park Jin-young and Shim Eun-ji. The song was also composed by Melanie Joy Fontana, Michel "Lindgren" Schulz, and A Wright. "I Can't Stop Me" is a synthwave and disco-infused pop song with '80s-influences and rich instrumental sound exuding a retro style. The track's lyrics describe the boundaries of the good and bad of intractable desires.

The accompanying music video, directed by Lee Gi-baek, premiered simultaneously with the release of the single. Sporting a retro atmosphere, the colorful video depicts Twice performing non-stop choreography to the song in multiple settings. To promote "I Can't Stop Me", the group appeared and performed on several South Korean music programs including M! Countdown, Music Bank, and Show! Music Core.

== Background and release ==
Twice released their ninth Korean-language EP More & More in June 2020. The EP was a commercial success in South Korea, selling over 550,000 copies and becoming the group's best-selling album. Following the success of More & More, JYP Entertainment announced that Twice would be releasing their second Korean studio album, Eyes Wide Open in October 2020, to commemorate the group's fifth anniversary. On October 11, the group shared the track-listing of Eyes Wide Open, where "I Can't Stop Me" was revealed to be the album opener.

The song was written by A Wright, Park Jin-young, Melanie Joy Fontana, Shim Eun-ji, and its producer Michel "Lindgren" Schulz. It was engineered by Sehee Eom, Eunjung Park, and Hyejin Choi, while the latter was additionally responsible for mixing alongside Tony Maserati which took place at Mirrorball Studios, North Hollywood, California. David K Younghyun was credited with assisting throughout the mixing process. Perrie provided backing vocals for the song, and mastering was handled by Chris Gehringer at Sterling Sound, Edgewater, New Jersey.

"I Can't Stop Me" was released as the lead single from Eyes Wide Open on October 26, 2020, by JYP Entertainment and Republic Records. It was choreographed by Jonte' Moaning, who had worked with Beyoncé for "Single Ladies", as well as Kiel Tutin and Leejung Lee, who previously collaborated for "More & More". The English version of "I Can't Stop Me" was released on November 30, 2020, as a digital single, and a Japanese version was included in the group's fourth compilation album #Twice4 on March 16, 2022. The Japanese lyrics were written by Natsumi Watanabe. A remixed version featuring Boys Like Girls was released on November 22, 2023, as part of Twice's The Remixes album.

== Composition ==
"I Can't Stop Me"
A 17-second sample of the chorus part of "I Can't Stop Me", an '80s synthwave and pop song.

"I Can't Stop Me" has been described as an '80s synthwave and pop song with elements of disco, with inspiration pulled from Dua Lipa's "Physical". It is the group's first attempt at the retro-synth genre that has inspired the musical direction of their entire album. The song draws from European electronic and American synth-pop sound, supported by an arrangement of drum machines, "intoxicating" Latin beats, and "strong" instrumental sound.

Lyrically, "I Can't Stop Me" talks about the conflict and duality of the good and bad of uncontrollable desires. Elaborating on the lyrics, member Dahyun stated, "It portrays the danger and anxiety that come from standing on the boundary between the good and bad. It also captures a provocative ambience that boldly crosses the line, which I feel that a lot of people will be surprised by seeing a new Twice that they've never seen before." She added that the track illustrates the group's "musical growth" the most amongst all tracks on the album. Justin Moran of Paper noted that the track is about "seduction and the ways we're constantly attracted to things we know we shouldn't want — things that are bad for us," through lines like, "I see the end, I know it's not right, I can't stop me, can't stop me." The song is composed in the key of A♯ minor, with a fast tempo of 150 beats per minute and runs for 3:25.

== Music video and promotion ==
=== Music video ===
In the lead-up to the release of "I Can't Stop Me", the group released photo and video teasers for the track, which served as a promotional tool for their return. An accompanying music video was uploaded to JYP Entertainment's YouTube channel on October 26, 2020. The video was directed by Lee Gi-baek of the production company Tiger-Cave Studio, who had previously worked with several Korean artists, including Got7, Beenzino and Zico, among others. Portrayed in retro, the visual features Twice performing "non-stop" choreography in a white subway station, a rainbow-colored canyon, and a large lotus flower, as they don color-coordinated looks. In one scene, the members are seated at a long table, facing their mirror images. Towards its conclusion, they are seen boarding a train wearing "high-fashion black-and-yellow" outfits similar to the plaid separates worn by Alicia Silverstone in the teen comedy film, Clueless (1995).

Discussing the fashion styles used in the music video, Chaeyoung said, "We also wanted to showcase our new sides visually, such as our widely beloved suit outfits from our teasers. We have many other kinds of outfits in store, some of them are featured in the song's music video." Moran wrote that the video showcases "Twice's star power, as the girls dance — perfectly in-sync, of course — throughout different environments, both on earth and somewhere in space." A choreography version was released on November 1, 2020. Its dance was choreographed by Kiel Tutin and Jonte Moaning. After 77 days of release, the music video surpassed 200 million views on YouTube.

=== Promotion ===
Hours after the song and the album's release, on October 26, 2020, Twice held a live meeting called "Twice 'I Can't Stop Me' Special Live" on Naver's V app and YouTube, introducing songs from the album and communicating with their fans. To promote the song and Eyes Wide Open, the group appeared and performed on several South Korean music programs, starting with Mnet's M! Countdown on October 29, where they performed "I Can't Stop Me" and "Up No More". They also appeared on KBS2's Music Bank, MBC's Show! Music Core, MBC M's Show Champion, and SBS' Inkigayo, to perform the song. In the second week of promotion, "I Can't Stop Me" won the top spot on Show Champion on November 4. A clip featuring group members Nayeon, Sana, Momo, and Chaeyoung, performing relay dance to the song, was posted to TikTok the same day. Twice performed the song for their US television debut with their appearance on the "#PlayAtHome" series of The Late Show With Stephen Colbert on November 30. Jeongyeon, who was on hiatus due to anxiety, did not participate in any promotional activities. She resumed activities with the group on January 31, 2021, at the 30th Seoul Music Awards, where they performed "I Can't Stop Me" as a full group for the first time.

== Accolades ==
"I Can't Stop Me" won seven music program awards in South Korea, including a triple crown (three wins) on Inkigayo. Several critics and publications named it amongst the best K-pop songs of 2020, including by Billboard (7th), Dazed (7th), Paper (11th), Ciarra Gaffney (10th), CNN Philippines, Refinery29, and South China Morning Post (last three unordered).

Music program awards
Program	Date	Ref.
Show Champion	November 4, 2020	
M Countdown	November 5, 2020	
M Countdown	November 12, 2020	
Music Bank	November 6, 2020	
Inkigayo	November 8, 2020	
Inkigayo	November 15, 2020	
Inkigayo	January 3, 2021	

== Credits and personnel ==
Credits adapted from Tidal and album liner notes.

=== Recording ===
- Recorded at JYPE Studios (Seoul, South Korea)
- Mixed at Mirrorball Studios (North Hollywood, California)
- Mastered at Sterling Sound (Edgewater, New Jersey)

=== Personnel ===
- Twice – lead vocals
- Michel "Lindgren" Schulz – composer, arranger, programming, bass, synthesizer
- A Wright – composer
- Melanie Joy Fontana – composer
- J. Y. Park "The Asiansoul" – lyricist
- Shim Eun-ji – lyricist, vocal director, digital editor
- Perrie – background vocals
- Choi Hye-jin – recording engineer, mixer
- Eom Se-hee – recording engineer
- Park Eun-jung – recording engineer
- Lee Sang-yeop – digital editor
- Tony Maserati – mixer
- David K Younghyun – assistant mixer
- Chris Gehringer – mastering engineer

== Charts ==
=== Weekly charts ===
Weekly chart performance
Chart (2020)	Peak position
Global 200 (Billboard)	31
Hong Kong (HKRIA)	3
Japan (Japan Hot 100)	5
Japan Digital Singles (Oricon)	9
Malaysia (RIM)	4
New Zealand Hot Singles (RMNZ)	13
Singapore (RIAS)	2
South Korea (Gaon)	8
South Korea (K-pop Hot 100)	5
UK Indie (Official Charts)	50
US World Digital Song Sales (Billboard)	1

=== Monthly charts ===
Monthly chart performance
Chart (2020)	Peak position
South Korea (Gaon)	10
South Korea (K-pop Hot 100)	13

=== Year-end charts ===
Year-end chart performance
Chart (2021)	Position
Global Excl. U.S. (Billboard)	192
Japan (Japan Hot 100)	71
South Korea (Gaon)	127

== Certifications ==
Certifications
Region	Certification	Certified units/sales
United States (RIAA)	Gold	500,000^{‡}
Streaming
Japan (RIAJ)	2× Platinum	200,000,000^{†}
^{‡} Sales+streaming figures based on certification alone.^{†} Streaming-only figures based on certification alone.

== Release history ==
Release dates and formats
Region	Date	Format	Label	Ref.
Various	October 26, 2020	Digital download; streaming	JYP; Republic	

== See also ==
- List of M Countdown Chart winners (2020)
- List of Music Bank Chart winners (2020)
- List of Inkigayo Chart winners (2020)
- List of Inkigayo Chart winners (2021)
