= List of number-one songs of 2020 (Malaysia) =

Below is a list of songs that topped the RIM charts in 2020 according to the Recording Industry Association of Malaysia.

== Chart history ==
The yellow background indicates the most streamed international song of 2020.

The green background indicates the most streamed domestic song of 2020.

Issue Date	International & Domestic songs			Domestic songs		
Issue Date	Song	Artist(s)	Ref.	Song	Artist(s)	Ref.
2 January	"Dance Monkey"	Tones and I		"Mimpi"	K-Clique featuring Alif	
9 January	"Dance Monkey"	Tones and I		"Mimpi"	K-Clique featuring Alif	
16 January	"Dance Monkey"	Tones and I		"Mimpi"	K-Clique featuring Alif	
23 January	"Black Swan"	BTS		"Sakit"	Zynakal featuring Yonnyboii	
30 January	"Dance Monkey"	Tones and I		"Sakit"	Zynakal featuring Yonnyboii	
6 February	"Dance Monkey"	Tones and I		"Sakit"	Zynakal featuring Yonnyboii	
13 February	"Dance Monkey"	Tones and I		"Sakit"	Zynakal featuring Yonnyboii	
20 February	"Dance Monkey"	Tones and I		"Sakit"	Zynakal featuring Yonnyboii	
27 February	"On"	BTS		"Sakit"	Zynakal featuring Yonnyboii	
5 March	"Intentions"	Justin Bieber featuring Quavo		"Sakit"	Zynakal featuring Yonnyboii	
12 March	"Intentions"	Justin Bieber featuring Quavo		"Sakit"	Zynakal featuring Yonnyboii	
19 March	"Wannabe"	Itzy		"Sakit"	Zynakal featuring Yonnyboii	
26 March	"Death Bed (Coffee for Your Head)"	Powfu featuring Beabadoobee		"Sakit"	Zynakal featuring Yonnyboii	
2 April	"Death Bed (Coffee for Your Head)"	Powfu featuring Beabadoobee		"Sakit"	Zynakal featuring Yonnyboii	
9 April	"Death Bed (Coffee for Your Head)"	Powfu featuring Beabadoobee		"Sakit"	Zynakal featuring Yonnyboii	
16 April	"Death Bed (Coffee for Your Head)"	Powfu featuring Beabadoobee		"Sakit"	Zynakal featuring Yonnyboii	
23 April	"Death Bed (Coffee for Your Head)"	Powfu featuring Beabadoobee		"Sakit"	Zynakal featuring Yonnyboii	
30 April	"Death Bed (Coffee for Your Head)"	Powfu featuring Beabadoobee		"Peluang Kedua"	Nabila Razali	
7 May	"Eight"	IU featuring Suga		"Peluang Kedua"	Nabila Razali	
14 May	"Stuck with U"	Ariana Grande and Justin Bieber		"Sumandak"	Faizal Tahir	
21 May	"Stuck with U"	Ariana Grande and Justin Bieber		"Seloka Hari Raya"	Uji Rashid and Hail Amir	
28 May	"Stuck with U"	Ariana Grande and Justin Bieber		"Suasana Hari Raya"	Anuar & Ellina	
4 June	"Sour Candy"	Lady Gaga and Blackpink		"Peluang Kedua"	Nabila Razali	
11 June	"Stuck with U"	Ariana Grande and Justin Bieber		"Peluang Kedua"	Nabila Razali	
18 June	"Stuck with U"	Ariana Grande and Justin Bieber		"Peluang Kedua"	Nabila Razali	
25 June	"Stuck with U"	Ariana Grande and Justin Bieber		"Peluang Kedua"	Nabila Razali	
2 July	"How You Like That"	Blackpink		"Peluang Kedua"	Nabila Razali	
9 July	"How You Like That"	Blackpink		"Peluang Kedua"	Nabila Razali	
16 July	"How You Like That"	Blackpink		"Peluang Kedua"	Nabila Razali	
23 July	"How You Like That"	Blackpink		"Peluang Kedua"	Nabila Razali	
30 July	"How You Like That"	Blackpink		"Aku Bidadari Syurgamu"	Siti Nurhaliza	
6 August	"How You Like That"	Blackpink		"Aku Bidadari Syurgamu"	Siti Nurhaliza	
13 August	"How You Like That"	Blackpink		"Aku Bidadari Syurgamu"	Siti Nurhaliza	
20 August	"How You Like That"	Blackpink		"Aku Bidadari Syurgamu"	Siti Nurhaliza	
27 August	"Dynamite"	BTS		"Aku Bidadari Syurgamu"	Siti Nurhaliza	
3 September	"Dynamite"	BTS		"Pulang"	K-Clique featuring AJ	
10 September	"Dynamite"	BTS		"Pulang"	K-Clique featuring AJ	
17 September	"Dynamite"	BTS		"Pulang"	K-Clique featuring AJ	
24 September	"Dynamite"	BTS		"Pulang"	K-Clique featuring AJ	
1 October	"Dynamite"	BTS		"Pulang"	K-Clique featuring AJ	
8 October	"Lovesick Girls"	Blackpink		"Pulang"	K-Clique featuring AJ	
15 October	"Lovesick Girls"	Blackpink		"Pulang"	K-Clique featuring AJ	
22 October	"Lovesick Girls"	Blackpink		"Pulang"	K-Clique featuring AJ	
29 October	"Positions"	Ariana Grande		"Pulang"	K-Clique featuring AJ	
5 November	"Positions"	Ariana Grande		"Pulang"	K-Clique featuring AJ	
12 November	"Lonely"	Justin Bieber and Benny Blanco		"Pulang"	K-Clique featuring AJ	
19 November	"Positions"	Ariana Grande		"Pulang"	K-Clique featuring AJ	
26 November	"Life Goes On"	BTS		"Pulang"	K-Clique featuring AJ	
3 December	"Life Goes On"	BTS		"Purnama"	Naim Daniel	
10 December	"Life Goes On"	BTS		"Purnama"	Naim Daniel	
17 December	"Life Goes On"	BTS		"Pulang"	K-Clique featuring AJ	
24 December	"At My Worst"	Pink Sweat$		"Pulang"	K-Clique featuring AJ	
31 December	"At My Worst"	Pink Sweat$		"Pulang"	K-Clique featuring AJ	
