= List of Music Bank Chart winners (2020) =

Music Bank Chart winners (2020)

Highlights
- Song with most wins: "Dynamite" by BTS (12)
- Artist(s) with most wins: BTS (16)
- Song with highest score: "On" by BTS (11,957)

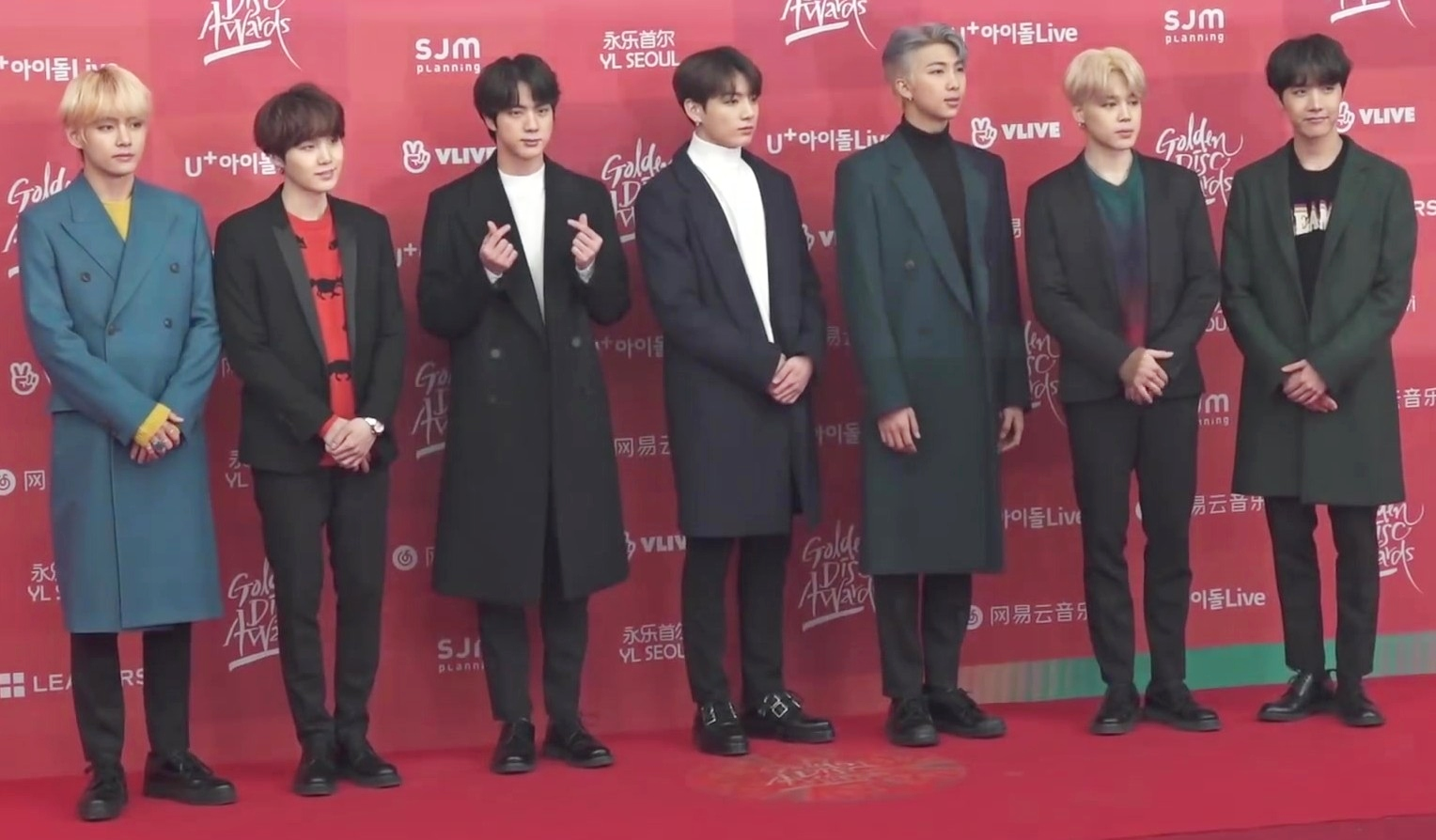
"On" by BTS had the highest score of 2020, with 11,957 on the March 6 broadcast. Their succeeding single "Dynamite" spent 12 weeks at the top spot in 2020, the most weeks of any song that year.

The Music Bank Chart is a record chart established in 1998 on the South Korean KBS television music program Music Bank. Every week during its live broadcast, the show gives an award for the best-performing single on the South Korean chart. The chart includes digital performance on domestic online music services (65%), album sales (5%), number of times the single was broadcast on KBS TV (20%), and viewers' choice (10%) in its ranking methodology. The score for domestic online music services is calculated using data from Melon, Bugs, Genie Music and Naver Vibe. Soribada was also used until November 2020, when it was replaced by Flo. The show was hosted by actress Shin Ye-eun and Golden Child member Choi Bo-min till July 17, 2020. Arin, a member of girl group Oh My Girl and Tomorrow X Together member Choi Soo-bin were announced as new hosts the following week.

In 2020, 31 singles reached number one on the chart, and 24 acts were awarded first-place trophies. "On" by BTS debuted at number one and stayed there for four consecutive weeks. It went on to achieve the highest score of the year, 11,957, on the March 6 broadcast. Their next single, "Dynamite", topped the chart for 12 non-consecutive weeks, making it the song with the most weeks at number one during the year. The two songs spent a total of 16 weeks atop the chart, making BTS the act with the most wins of the year. Red Velvet's sub-unit Red Velvet – Irene & Seulgi received their first music show win on the July 17 broadcast with "Monster". Girl group (G)I-dle received their first Music Bank trophy for "Oh My God". Exo member Suho received his first music show award for his debut single "Let's Love".

The first number-one single of the year was "Psycho" by girl group Red Velvet, which was released the previous year. It debuted at number one and stayed there for three non-consecutive weeks. SF9 achieved their first number one with "Good Guy" from their first Korean studio album First Collection. Zico of boy group Block B received his first Music Bank trophy as a soloist for "Any Song" after it went viral when he started a dance challenge by posting videos of himself and South Korean singers Hwasa and Chungha dancing to the song on TikTok with the hashtag "Any Song Challenge". NCT's sub-unit NCT Dream won their first Music Bank award with "Ridin'" on the May 8 broadcast.

== Chart history ==
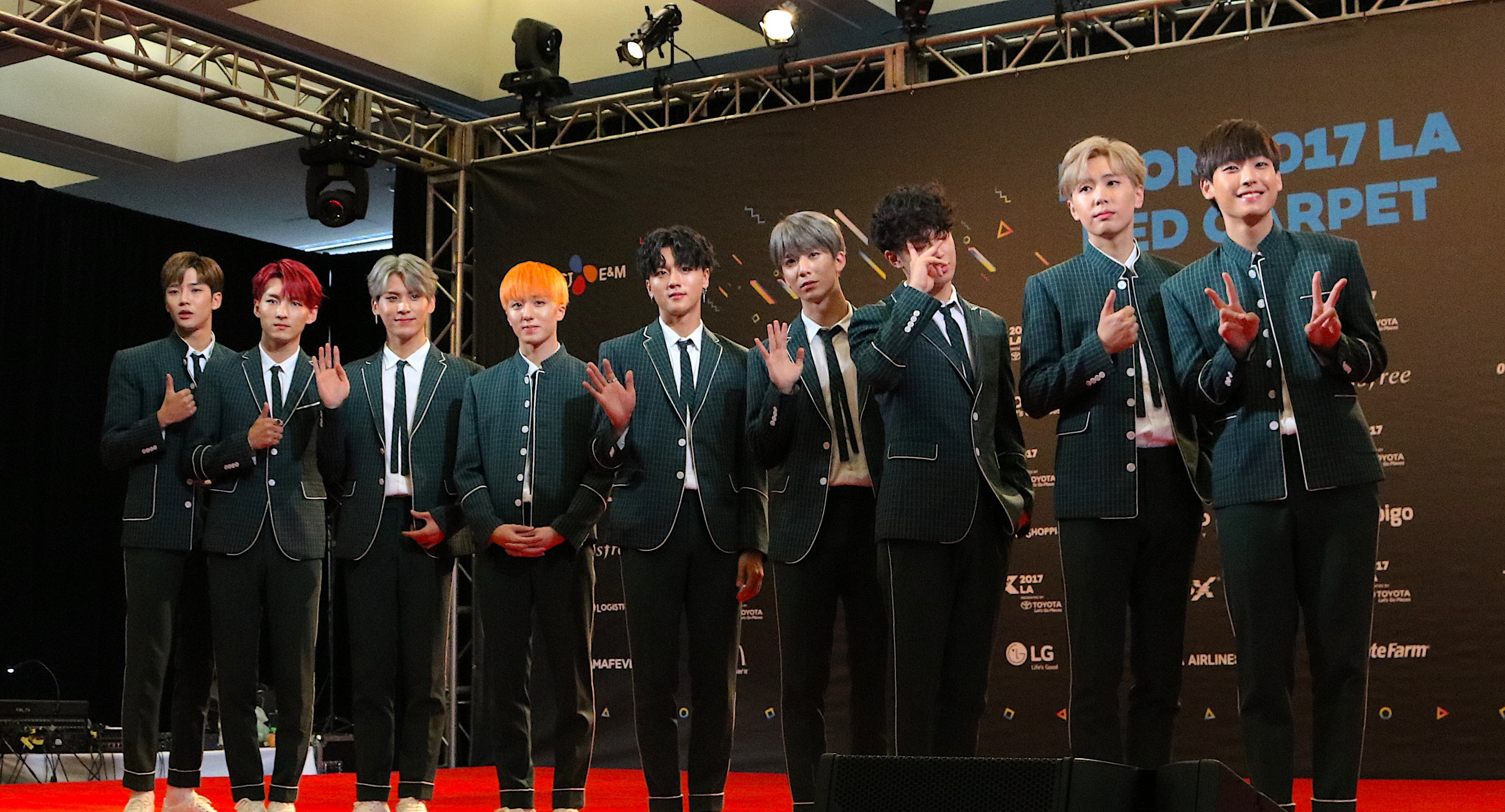
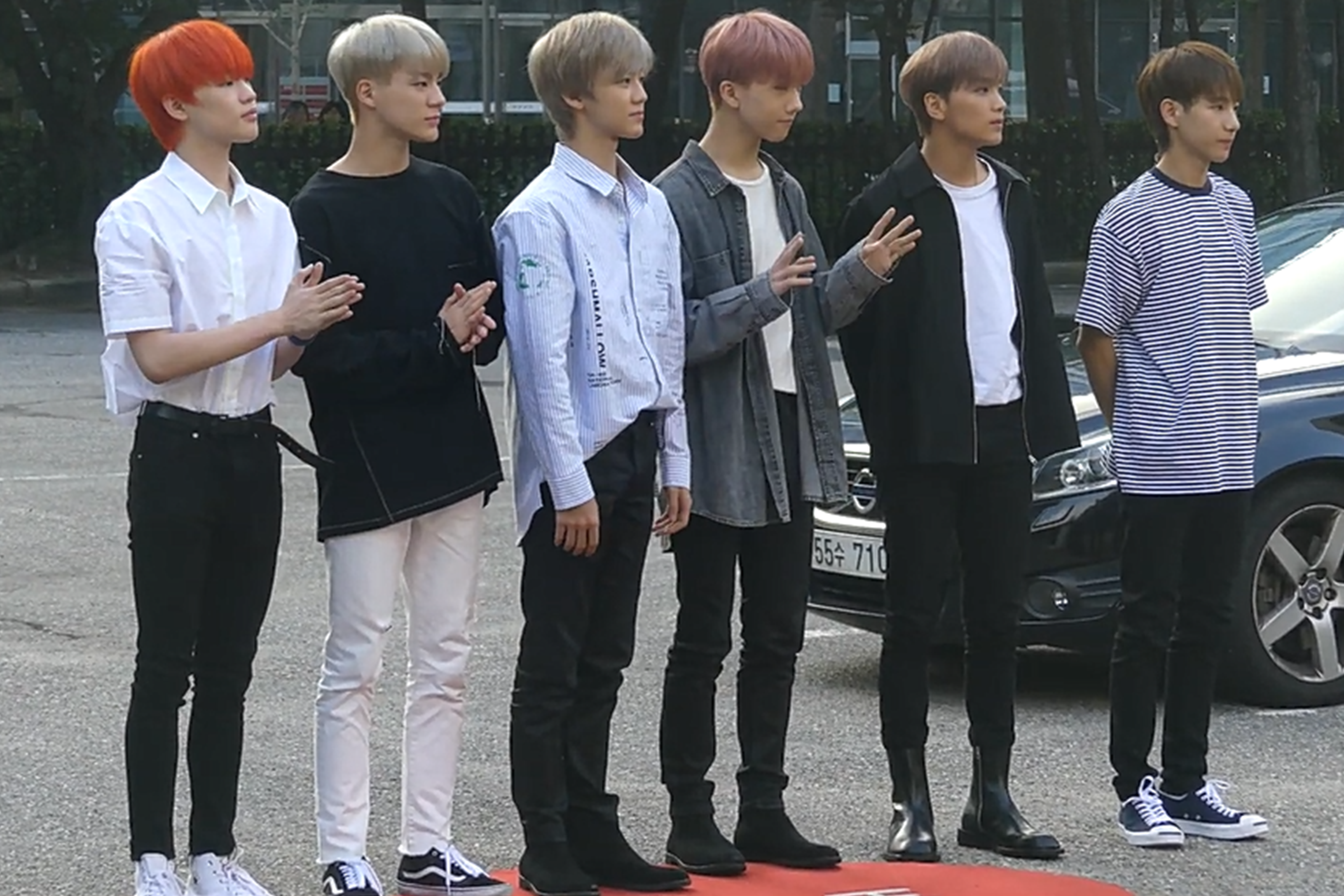
SF9 (top) and NCT Dream (bottom) received their first broadcast channel music show wins with their Music Bank trophies for "Good Guy" and "Ridin'", respectively.
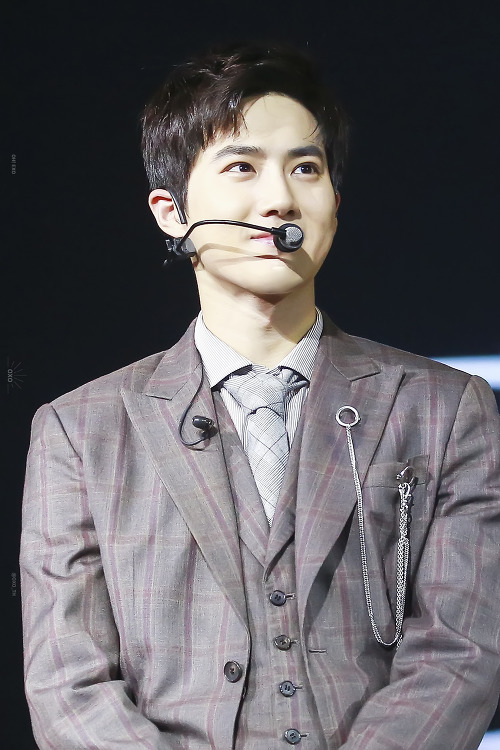
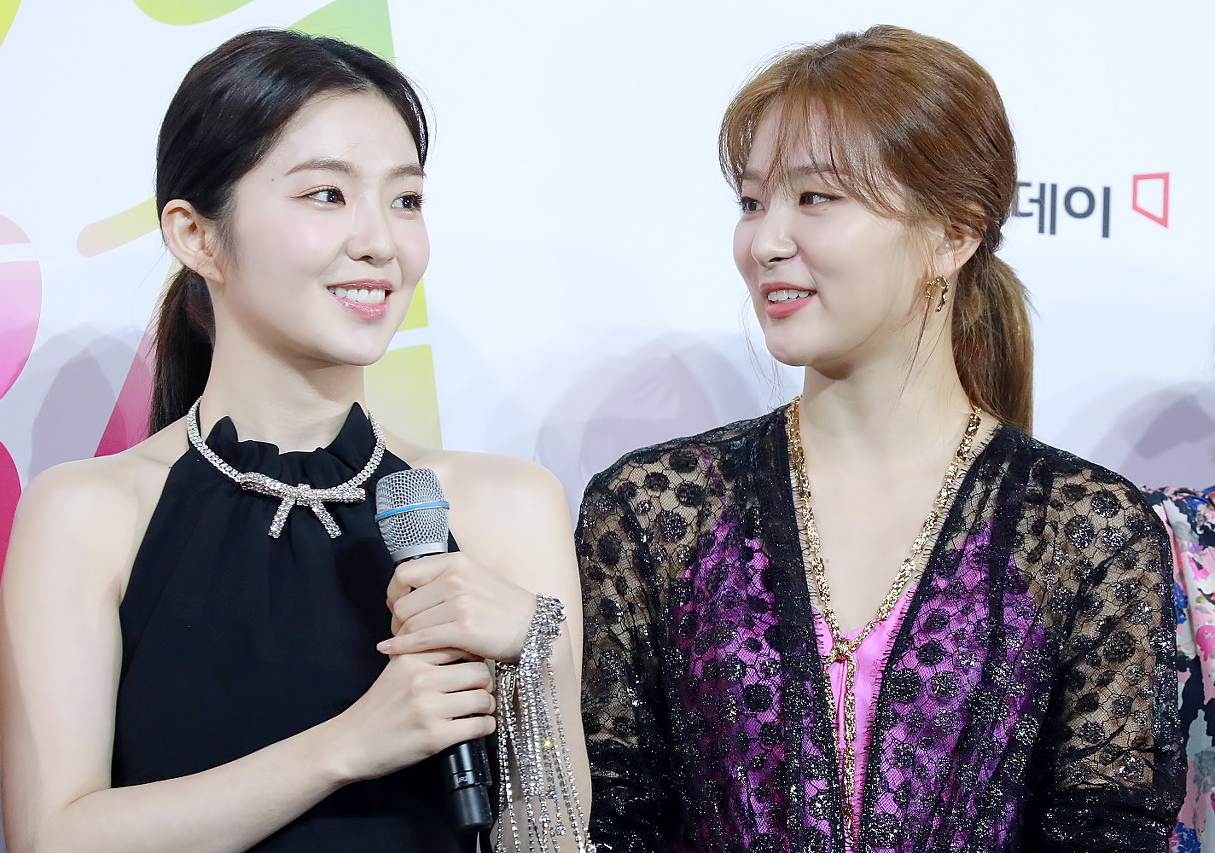
The Music Bank trophies for "Let's Love" and "Monster", respectively, marked the first music show wins for Suho of Exo (left), and Red Velvet – Irene & Seulgi (right).

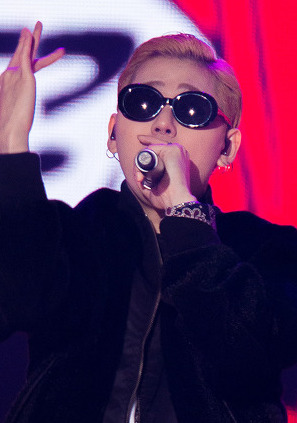
Zico of Block B received his first Music Bank awards as a soloist for "Any Song" on episode 1,013.

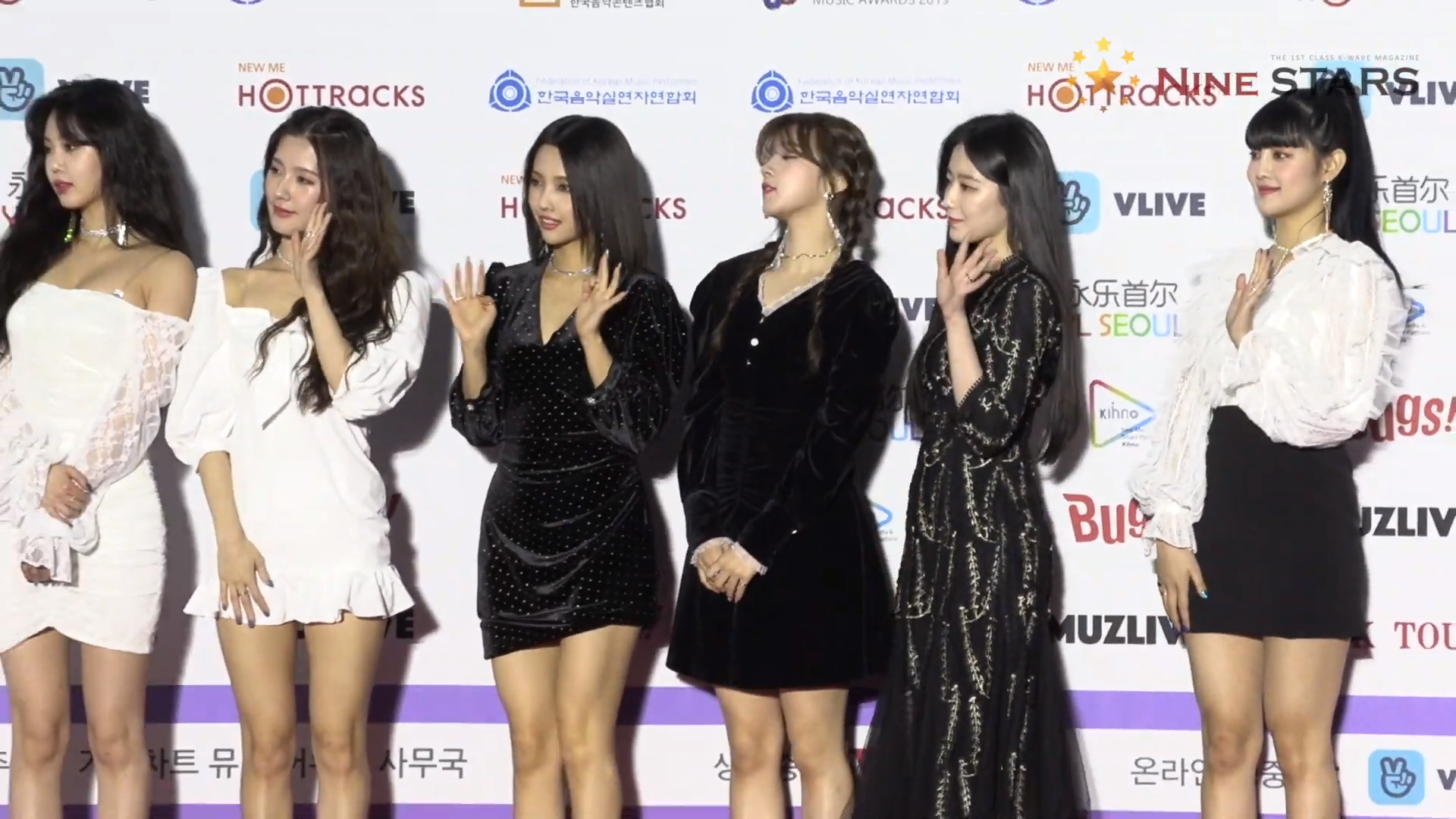
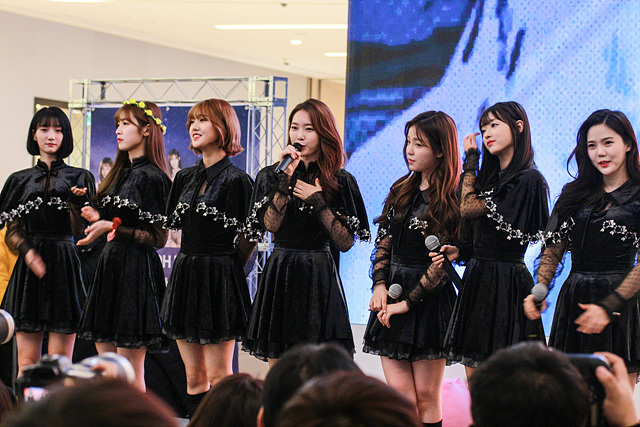
(G)I-dle (top) and Oh My Girl (bottom) received their first Music Bank trophies for "Oh My God" and "Nonstop", respectively.

Key
‡	Highest score in 2020
—	No show was broadcast

Chart history
Episode	Date	Artist	Song	Points	Ref.
1,010	January 3	Red Velvet	"Psycho"	7,465	
1,011	January 10	Red Velvet	"Psycho"	6,649	
1,012	January 17	SF9	"Good Guy"	5,185	
— (Note: This week's winners were announced on the station's official website.)	January 24	Red Velvet	"Psycho"	4,594	
1,013	January 31	Zico	"Any Song"	5,469	
1,014	February 7	Zico	"Any Song"	4,490	
1,015	February 14	GFriend	"Crossroads"	4,888	
1,016	February 21	Zico	"Any Song"	4,006	
1,017	February 28	BTS	"On"	9,785	
1,018	March 6	BTS	"On"	11,957 ‡	
1,019	March 13	BTS	"On"	9,188	
1,020	March 20	BTS	"On"	5,696	
1,021	March 27	NCT 127	"Kick It"	6,915	
1,022	April 3	Kang Daniel	"2U"	6,826	
1,023	April 10	Suho	"Let's Love"	8,177	
1,024	April 17	(G)I-dle	"Oh My God"	5,831	
1,025	April 24	Apink	"Dumhdurum"	5,600	
1,026	May 1	Got7	"Not By The Moon"	7,308	
1,027	May 8	NCT Dream	"Ridin'"	9,123	
1,028	May 15	Oh My Girl	"Nonstop"	5,922	
1,029	May 22	NU'EST	"I'm in Trouble"	9,167	
1,030	May 29	NCT 127	"Punch"	5,474	
1,031	June 5	Baekhyun	"Candy"	8,236	
1,032	June 12	Twice	"More & More"	9,408	
1,033	June 19	Twice	"More & More"	4,791	
1,034	June 26	Iz*One	"Secret Story of the Swan"	7,890	
1,035	July 3	Seventeen	"Left & Right"	11,579	
1,036	July 10	Blackpink	"How You Like That"	4,981	
1,037	July 17	Red Velvet – Irene & Seulgi	"Monster"	6,467	
1,038	July 24	Exo-SC	"1 Billion Views"	6,431	
1,039	July 31	Blackpink	"How You Like That"	6,146	
1,040 (Note: Episode 1,040 was recorded on August 7 and broadcast on August 14.)	August 7	Hwasa	"María"	3,889	
—	August 14	Kang Daniel	"Who U Are"	6,248	
1,041	August 21	Hwasa	"María"	3,498	
1,042	August 28	Itzy	"Not Shy"	6,843	
1,043	September 4	BTS	"Dynamite"	6,569	
1,044	September 11	BTS	"Dynamite"	7,454	
1,045	September 18	BTS	"Dynamite"	6,963	
1,046	September 25	BTS	"Dynamite"	7,099	
—	October 2	BTS	"Dynamite"	6,341	
1,047	October 9	BTS	"Dynamite"	6,532	
1,048	October 16	Blackpink	"Lovesick Girls"	11,562	
1,049	October 23	NCT U	"Make A Wish (Birthday Song)"	7,876	
1,050	October 30	Seventeen	"Home;Run"	10,171	
1,051	November 6	Twice	"I Can't Stop Me"	5,420	
1,052	November 13	BTS	"Dynamite"	4,371	
1,053	November 20	BTS	"Dynamite"	4,505	
1,054	November 27	BTS	"Dynamite"	11,636	
1,055	December 4	BTS	"Dynamite"	10,014	
1,056	December 11	BTS	"Dynamite"	4,250	
—	December 18	Iz*One	"Panorama"	8,074	
—	December 25	BTS	"Dynamite"	3,570	
