= List of Billboard Digital Song Sales number ones of 2020 =

2020 highest-selling digital singles in the United States

The list of number-one digital songs of 2020 in the United States is based upon the highest-selling downloaded songs ranked in the Digital Song Sales chart published by Billboard magazine. The data are compiled by Nielsen SoundScan based on each song's weekly digital sales, which combines sales of different versions of a song by an act for a summarized figure.

== Chart history ==
Key
†	Indicates best-performing song of 2020

Issue date	Song	Artist(s)	Weekly sales	Ref(s)
January 4	"Good as Hell"	Lizzo	20,000	
January 11	"Memories"	Maroon 5	25,000	
January 18	"Yummy"	Justin Bieber	71,000	
January 25	"Life Is Good"	Future featuring Drake	25,000	
February 1	"What a Man Gotta Do"	Jonas Brothers	34,000	
February 8	"Anyone"	Demi Lovato	41,000	
February 15	"Only the Young"	Taylor Swift	30,000	
February 22	"Yikes"	Nicki Minaj	20,000	
February 29	"No Time to Die"	Billie Eilish	25,000	
March 7	"On"	BTS	86,000	
March 14	"Stupid Love"	Lady Gaga	53,000	
March 21	"I Love Me"	Demi Lovato	38,000	
March 28	"Blinding Lights"	The Weeknd	16,000	
April 4	"The Gambler"	Kenny Rogers	21,000	
April 11	"Blinding Lights"	The Weeknd	22,000	
April 18	"Lean on Me"	Bill Withers	28,000	
April 25	"Blinding Lights"	The Weeknd	21,000	
May 2	"Blinding Lights"	The Weeknd	19,000	
May 9	"The Scotts"	The Scotts, Travis Scott and Kid Cudi	67,000	
May 16	"Say So"	Doja Cat featuring Nicki Minaj	66,000	
May 23	"Stuck with U"	Ariana Grande and Justin Bieber	108,000	
May 30	"Savage"	Megan Thee Stallion featuring Beyoncé	30,000	
June 6	"Rain on Me"	Lady Gaga and Ariana Grande	72,000	
June 13	"Savage"	Megan Thee Stallion featuring Beyoncé	14,000	
June 20	"Savage"	Megan Thee Stallion featuring Beyoncé	12,000	
June 27	"Trollz"	6ix9ine and Nicki Minaj	116,000	
July 4	"Black Parade"	Beyoncé	18,000	
July 11	"Wash Us in the Blood"	Kanye West and Travis Scott	18,000	
July 18	"God Bless the U.S.A."	Lee Greenwood	15,000	
July 25	"The Adventures of Moon Man & Slim Shady"	Kid Cudi and Eminem	26,000	
August 1	"Popstar"	DJ Khaled featuring Drake	15,000	
August 8	"Cardigan"	Taylor Swift	71,000	
August 15	"Watermelon Sugar"	Harry Styles	63,000	
August 22	"WAP"	Cardi B featuring Megan Thee Stallion	125,000	
August 29	"WAP"	Cardi B featuring Megan Thee Stallion	36,000	
September 5	"Dynamite" †	BTS	265,000	
September 12	"Dynamite" †	BTS	182,000	
September 19	"Dynamite" †	BTS	136,000	
September 26	"Dynamite" †	BTS	78,000	
October 3	"Dynamite" †	BTS	153,000	
October 10	"Dynamite" †	BTS	86,000	
October 17	"Dynamite" †	BTS	94,000	
October 24	"Dynamite" †	BTS	44,000	
October 31	"Dynamite" †	BTS	25,000	
November 7	"Forever After All"	Luke Combs	52,000	
November 14	"Dynamite" †	BTS	12,000	
November 21	"What That Speed Bout!?"	Mike Will Made It, Nicki Minaj and YoungBoy Never Broke Again	13,000	
November 28	"Iris"	Phoebe & Maggie	38,000	
December 5	"Life Goes On"	BTS	129,000	
December 12	"Life Goes On"	BTS	44,000	
December 19	"Life Goes On"	BTS		
December 26	"Willow"	Taylor Swift	59,000	

== See also ==
- 2020 in American music
- List of Billboard Hot 100 number-one singles of 2020
- List of number-one Billboard Streaming Songs of 2020
