= Secret Story of the Swan =

2020 single by Iz*One

Single by Iz*One

from the EP Oneiric Diary
- Language: Korean
- Released: June 15, 2020
- Recorded: 2020
- Genre: EDM; electropop
- Length: 3:12
- Label: Off The Record; Swing
- Songwriter: MosPick
- Producer: MosPick

Iz*One singles chronology
"Fiesta" (2020)	"Secret Story of the Swan" (2020)	"Beware" (2020)

Music video
- "Secret Story of the Swan" on YouTube

"Secret Story of the Swan" (Korean: 환상동화; RR: Hwansangdonghwa) is a song recorded by South Korean–Japanese girl group Iz*One. It is the lead single in their third extended play Oneiric Diary. It was released on June 15, 2020, by Off the Record and Swing Entertainment.

== Background and release ==
On March 9, 2020, Pledis Entertainment founder and chief executive officer Han Sung-soo announced he would step down from co-managing Iz*One after their first studio album, Bloom*Iz. On March 10, a day later, it was reported that Swing Entertainment would take part in managing the group. A source from the agency confirmed the reports and that Swing would co-manage the group. On May 19, Iz*One shared a notice via their FanCafe, that they would be releasing their fourth extended play (EP) on June 15. It announced the members were in the last stage of production and are releasing a higher quality performance. On June 1, Iz*One released an album trailer announcing the name for their album: Oneiric Diary. On June 8, the track list for the album was released, revealing the title track to be "Secret Story of the Swan", along with seven other tracks, one being written by Hitomi, with Nako and Sakura writing the Japanese version of the song. On June 11, the teaser for the music video was released, with a second being released a day later. The music video ended up being delayed a day later, set to be released the same day as the album, but was released on June 16.

== Composition ==
"Secret Story of the Swan" is an EDM track composed in G minor, a tempo of 103 beats per minute, and the 4/4 common-time signature. The song is about becoming who you have dreamed of becoming deep in your heart. Iz*One portray themselves as the protagonists of a fairytale in the lyrics. As the song literally means "Fantasy Fairytale", it was written, arranged, and composed, by MosPick. The Japanese version of the song was also written by members Nako and Sakura along with MosPick.

== Promotion ==
Iz*One made their comeback stage on M! Countdown along with other artists such as WJSN, Stray Kids, and N.Flying.

== Commercial performance ==
On the South Korean Gaon Digital Chart, the song debuted at number six, becoming the group's second top ten hit in the country. The song also peaked at number 11 on the US World Digital Song Sales, becoming their highest-charting entry on the chart since "Violeta". On the K-pop Hot 100, the song arrived at number five, becoming their third top 10 entry.

== Music video ==
Their music video, was delayed a day, was released on June 16, 2020. In the video, Iz*One portray the protagonists of their own fairytale, matching the lyrical content. On June 23, a performance version was released as well.

== Accolades ==
Awards for "Secret Story of the Swan"
Year	Organization	Award	Result	Ref.
2020	Mnet Asian Music Awards	Best Dance Performance – Female Group	Nominated	
2020	Mnet Asian Music Awards	Song of the Year	Longlisted	

== Music Show Wins ==
Music program awards for "Secret Story of the Swan"
Program	Date	Ref.
The Show	June 23, 2020	
The Show	June 30, 2020	
Show Champion	June 24, 2020	
M Countdown	June 25, 2020	
Music Bank	June 26, 2020	
Show! Music Core	June 27, 2020	
Inkigayo	June 28, 2020	

== Charts ==
Chart (2020)	Peak position
South Korea (Gaon)	6
South Korea (K-pop Hot 100)	9
US World Digital Songs (Billboard)	11

== See also ==
- List of M Countdown Chart winners (2020)
- List of Music Bank Chart winners (2020)
