= More & More (Twice song) =

2020 single by Twice

- English version cover

Single by Twice

from the EP More & More
- Language: Korean
- Released: June 1, 2020
- Genre: Tropical house
- Length: 3:19
- Label: JYP; Republic
- Composers: Zara Larsson; Julia Michaels; Justin Tranter; Uzoechi Emenike
- Lyricists: Bibi; J. Y. Park

Twice singles chronology
"Fake & True" (2020)	"More & More" (2020)	"Fanfare" (2020)

Music video
- "More & More" on YouTube

"More & More" is a song recorded by South Korean girl group Twice. It was released on June 1, 2020, by JYP Entertainment as the lead single of the group's ninth extended play of the same name. The song was written by Park Jin-young and Bibi, while composed by Zara Larsson, Julia Michaels, Justin Tranter and Uzoechi Emenike. Musically, it is a tropical house song featuring an instrumental chorus. The lyrics detail the emotions that intensifies in a romantic relationship.

Upon release, "More & More" received generally positive reviews from music critics, who praised the group's vocals, the production and musical direction. Commercially, the song debuted at number four on the Gaon Digital Chart and at number three on the Billboard Japan Hot 100 chart. The track also charted at number two on the US World Digital Song Sales chart.

An accompanying Garden of Eden-themed music video for the song was released in conjunction with the release of the song and features the group dancing in a colourful forest. The video amassed 14.7 million views in 15 hours on YouTube. Twice promoted the song with televised live performances on various South Korean music programs including M! Countdown, Music Bank and Inkigayo.

== Background and release ==
On April 28, 2020, Twice revealed the title and release date of the song during a press conference. A music video trailer for the song was released on May 24, followed by a teaser on May 26 at midnight. The clips depict the group in fairy-themed outfits inside a forest performing the track's "intro" choreography. "More & More" was released for streaming and digital download on June 1, 2020, by JYP Entertainment as the lead single of the group's ninth extended play of the same name.

Twice's sixth Japanese maxi single, "Fanfare", was released on July 8, 2020, including the Japanese-language version of "More & More". This version was also included in the compilation #Twice3, released on September 16, 2020. The Japanese lyrics were written by Natsumi Watanabe. During their online concert "Beyond LIVE - Twice: World in a Day", held on August 9, 2020, Twice announced their English-language version of "More & More", which was released on August 21, 2020.

== Composition ==
"More & More" is described as a rhythmic, summery midtempo tropical house song. It incorporates an EDM-heavy and synth-pop instrumental chorus, and a dubstep-influenced dance-break music at its bridge. Based on characteristic "seasonal sounds," the song opens with "velvety vocals" that shifts towards a synth-based refrain. In terms of musical notation, the song is composed in the key of F major at a moderate tempo of 107 beats per minute. It runs for three minutes and nineteen seconds. The lyrics revolve around the intensifying longing and desire that a person in love endures.

== Critical reception ==
Kim Do-heon of IZM praised the song's production, melody and sound writing, "Tropical House song 'More & More', which has a neat and calm sound structure, has been polished neatly and well, removing a considerable number of lively adrenaline and busy sound samples and putting in as much sound as necessary." Reviewing for Time, Kat Moon complimented the song's musical direction and dual concept, while also appreciating the group's vocals on the hook of the track.

Upon release, "More & More" topped the real-time charts of major Korean music platforms including Melon, Bugs, Genie, Soribada and Naver Music. The track debuted at number four on the Gaon Digital Chart for the chart issue dated June 6, 2020. The song topped the component Download Chart while peaking at number five on the Streaming Chart. Additionally, the song charted at number two on the US Billboard World Digital Song Sales chart and at number three on the Billboard Japan Hot 100 chart.

== Music video and promotion ==
=== Music video ===
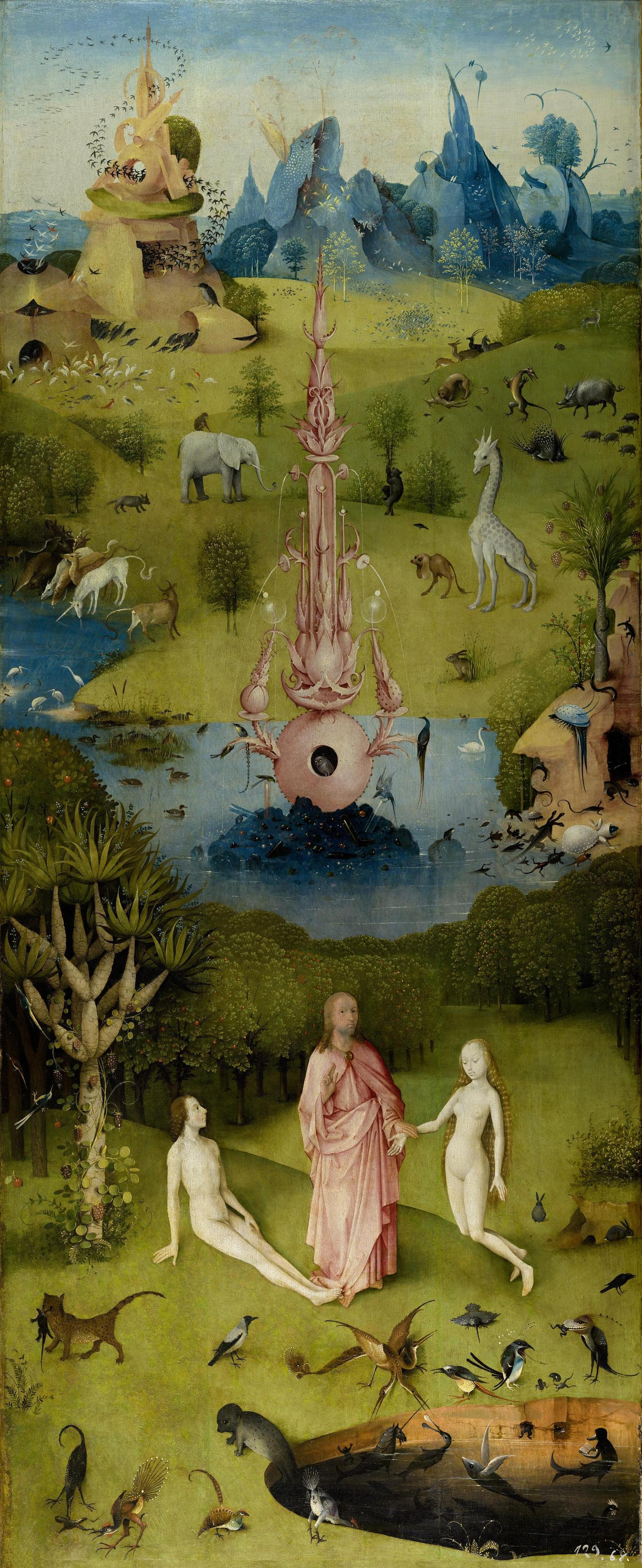
The music video was inspired by the Garden of Eden.

An accompanying music video for "More & More" was uploaded to JYP's official YouTube channel on June 1, 2020. Upon release, the video went viral, garnering 14.7 million views in only 15 hours. Filmed in Jeju Island, the video is choreography-heavy and inspired by the Garden of Eden. The opening scene depicts the group in the backdrop of a paradise-like forest surrounded by "bright neon foliage", butterflies, and animals. The clip is interspersed with scenes where the group is seen dancing, and reaching for apples or preparing to take a bite. Having a "bohemian" and summer festival-like vibe, it also features the members dancing on a platform on a lake. Besides the cheerful and vibrant atmosphere, the visual also includes shots of a serpent wrapped around a tree, a black cat, and tarantulas.

=== Promotion ===
A few hours after the album's release, the group's first performance of "More & More" was broadcast live through Naver's V Live app and YouTube. The group promoted the song on various South Korean music programs starting with Mnet's M! Countdown on June 4, 2020. This was followed by performances on KBS's Music Bank and SBS's Inkigayo. In their second week of promotion, Twice received their first music show trophy for "More & More" on MBC Music's Show Champion. The group appeared as guests on June 7 episode of the variety show Running Man.

== Accolades ==
"More & More" won 9 music program awards in South Korea. It was nominated for Best Dance Performance – Female Group at the 2020 Mnet Asian Music Awards and Artist of the Year – Digital Music (June) at the 10th Gaon Chart Music Awards, but lost to "How You Like That" by Blackpink.

Music program awards for "More & More"
Program	Date	Ref.
Show Champion	June 10, 2020	
Show Champion	June 17, 2020	
M Countdown	June 11, 2020	
Music Bank	June 12, 2020	
Music Bank	June 19, 2020	
Show! Music Core	June 13, 2020	
Show! Music Core	June 20, 2020	
Inkigayo	June 14, 2020	
Inkigayo	June 21, 2020	

== Credits and personnel ==
Credits adapted from Tidal and Melon.

- Twice – primary vocals
- J. Y. Park – lyricist, vocal producer
- Uzoechi Emenike – composer, arranger
- Zara Larsson – backing vocals, composer
- Julia Michaels – composer
- Justin Tranter – composer
- Bibi – lyricist
- Brayton Bowman – backing vocals
- Sophia Pae – backing vocals
- Lee Hae-sol – vocal arrangement
- Lee Tae-seop – mixing
- Kwon Nam-woo – mastering engineer
- Choi Hye-jin – digital editing, recording engineer
- Um Se-hee – digital editing, recording engineer
- Lee Sang-yeop – digital editing, recording engineer

== Charts ==
=== Weekly charts ===
Weekly chart performance
Chart (2020)	Peak position
Japan (Japan Hot 100)	3
Japan Combined Weekly Singles (Oricon)	5
Malaysia (RIM)	2
New Zealand Hot Singles (RMNZ)	12
Singapore (RIAS)	1
South Korea (Gaon)	4
South Korea (K-pop Hot 100)	2
US World Digital Song Sales (Billboard)	2

=== Monthly charts ===
Monthly chart performance
Chart (2020)	Peak position
South Korea (Gaon)	4

=== Year-end charts ===
Year-end chart performance
Chart (2020)	Position
South Korea (Gaon)	64

== Certifications ==
Streaming certifications for "More & More"
Region	Certification	Certified units/sales
Japan (RIAJ)	Platinum	100,000,000^{†}
^{†} Streaming-only figures based on certification alone.

== See also ==
- List of Inkigayo Chart winners (2020)
- List of M Countdown Chart winners (2020)
- List of Music Bank Chart winners (2020)
- List of number-one songs of 2020 (Singapore)
- List of Show! Music Core Chart winners (2020)
