= On (song) =

2020 single by BTS

- Sia remix cover

Single by BTS / BTS featuring Sia

from the album Map of the Soul: 7
- Language: Korean
- Released: February 21, 2020
- Genre: Trap; pop
- Length: 4:06
- Label: Big Hit
- Songwriters: Antonina Armato; August Rigo; RM; Julia Ross; Krysta Youngs; Melanie Fontana; Michel Schulz; Pdogg; J-Hope; Suga
- Producer: Pdogg

BTS singles chronology
"Black Swan" (2020)	"On" (2020)	"Stay Gold" (2020)

Sia singles chronology
"Original" (2020)	"On" (2020)	"Saved My Life" (2020)

Kinetic Manifesto Film
- "On" on YouTube

Music video
- "On" on YouTube

"On" (stylized in all caps) is a song recorded by South Korean boy band BTS. It was released on February 21, 2020, as the second single from the band's fourth Korean-language album Map of the Soul: 7. A version featuring Australian singer Sia was also released and features on the digital and streaming version of the album.

== Background and release ==
On January 7, 2020, BTS announced their fourth Korean-language studio album Map of the Soul: 7. The following day, the group shared a "comeback" map revealing a schedule split into four phases, with two singles. The first of which, "Black Swan" was released on January 17, 2020. Exactly a month later, the group released the album's tracklist, revealing "On" as the album's lead single and a remix of the song featuring Australian singer Sia. According to Big Hit, the group organized the collaboration. "On" and the remix with Sia were made available for music download and streaming in various locations on February 21, 2020, through Big Hit. The tracklist for BTS' fourth Japanese studio album Map of the Soul: 7 ~ The Journey ~ was published on May 8, and included a Japanese version of "On". The track was made available digitally simultaneously with the album on July 14, 2020, through Def Jam, Virgin and Big Hit.

== Composition ==
"On" was written by RM, August Rigo, Melanie Fontana, Michel Schulz, Suga, J-Hope, Antonina Armato, Krysta Youngs, Julia Ross, and its producer Pdogg. The song is composed in the key of A minor in a tempo of 106 beats per minute and runs for 4:06. Lyrically, the song talks about how their success changed their lives, the sacrifices that they have made, and having the strength to continue their career despite "the unknown future."

== Reception ==
In her review for Clash magazine, Deb Aderinkomi called "On" a "quintessential BTS song". Jae-Ha Kim of Variety, described the song as "anthemic, stadium-ready quality". Writing for Time, Raisa Bruner noted that "On is already massive, kicking off with gospel-influenced organ, featuring propulsive percussion and a snare drum sing-along and tearing things up with an uplifting refrain" but Sia's presence "speaks to their ambitions to be taken seriously as a chart-topping pop act, regardless of language".

== Promotion ==
On February 19, it was announced that the band would release a 30-second video teaser of the lead single on TikTok, 12 hours ahead of the official release of the song on February 21. The day after the song release, a Commentary Film was released showing the work UCLA Herb Alpert School of Music's Bruin Marching Band directors and team members had in the production of some of the songs on the album, and the essence of BTS' message.

The band performed the song at the main concourse of Grand Central Station on The Tonight Show Starring Jimmy Fallon on February 24, 2020, for what has been called "one of the most high-production episodes" of the show. They also appeared in the Carpool Karaoke segment on The Late Late Show with James Corden.

== Commercial performance ==
In South Korea, "On" debuted at number eleven on the eighth issue of the Gaon Digital Chart, for the period February 16–22, with less than two days of tracking. The following week, the single reached number one, becoming BTS' sixth track to do so. It spent six weeks in the chart's top ten and was the 22nd best-performing song of February, peaking at number four on the Gaon Monthly Chart in March 2020. On the Billboard K-pop Hot 100, the single debuted at number 41 on the chart issue dated February 29, 2020. It peaked atop the chart the following week and maintained the lead position for three consecutive weeks. In Malaysia, the song debuted atop the RIM Charts, while the Sia remix peaked at number five on the chart.

In the United States, "On" debuted at number four on the Billboard Hot 100, becoming the highest-charting song by a Korean group in the country, with over 86,000 digital downloads sold in its release week. It ranked at number 68 in its second week and left the chart afterwards.

== Music videos ==
=== Kinetic Manifesto Film: Come Prima ===
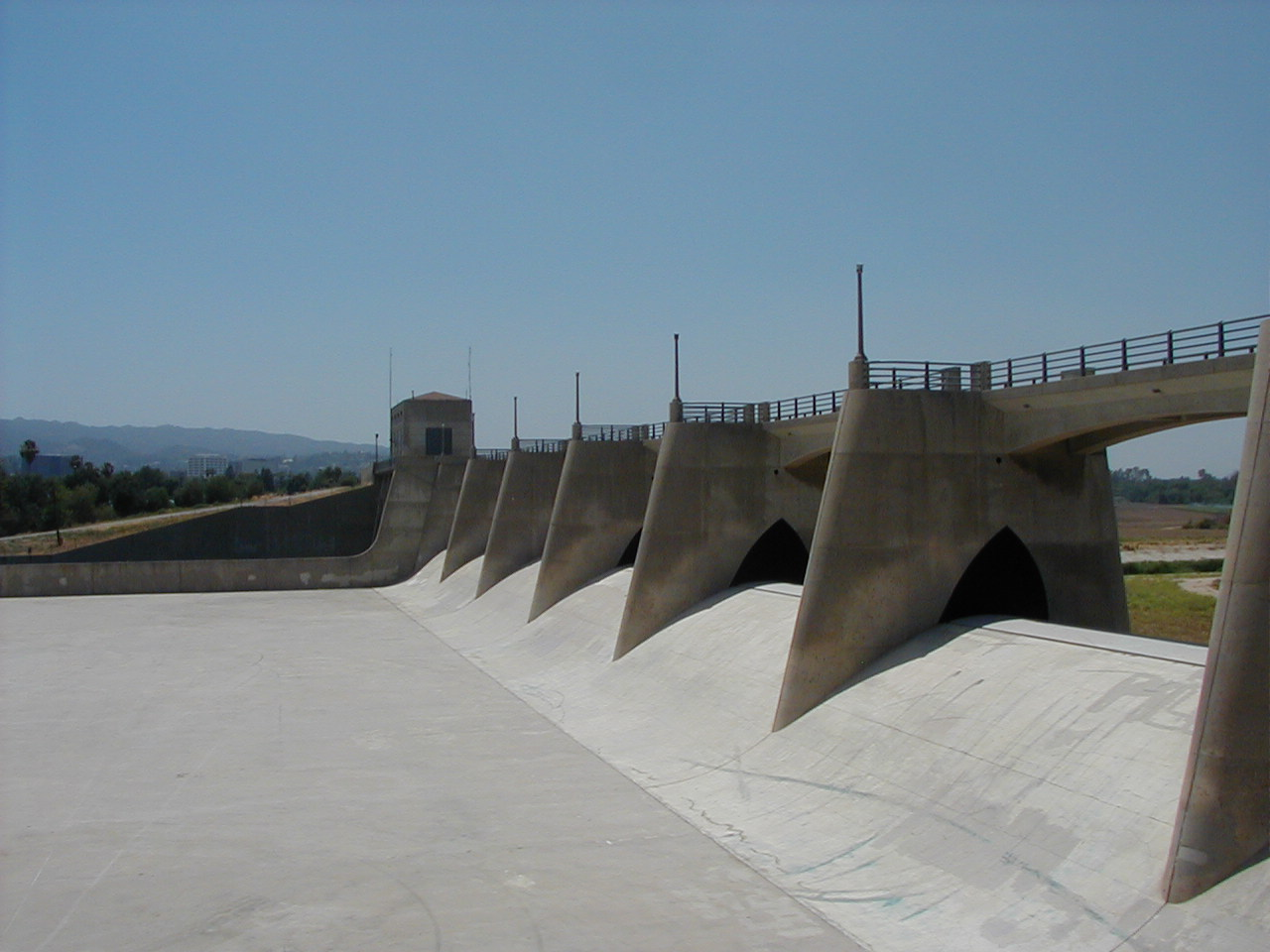
The "Kinetic Manifesto Film: Come Prima" video was filmed at the Sepulveda Dam.

The first music video, dubbed "Kinetic Manifesto Film: Come Prima", was released on February 21, 2020, in conjunction with the release of the single and the album. It shows BTS, World of Dance Season 2 champions The Lab, and the Blue Devils Drum and Bugle Corps performing the choreography near the Sepulveda Dam, adding a dance break that is now continuously used for promotion.

It was the seventh most-watched online video in the first 24 hours, and the fifth most-watched YouTube video at the time; it gained 46.5 million views in this time frame.

=== Music video ===
The second official music video was released on February 28, 2020 at 0:00 KST. Within minutes of its release, the video became the biggest YouTube premiere of all time with 1.54 million concurrent viewers. The video reached 10 million views in one hour, surpassing the record held by "Boy With Luv" as the fastest Korean video to achieve this. The video contains references to various films and television shows, including The Maze Runner, Bird Box, The Handmaid's Tale, The Lion King, Game of Thrones, Narnia, and Dolittle. The video also includes a reference to the Biblical stories of Noah's Ark and Adam and Eve. The music video garnered 43.8 million views on its first day, surpassing Taylor Swift's "Look What You Made Me Do" as the seventh most-viewed video on YouTube in the first 24 hours. After a number of fans on social media accused YouTube of removing millions of views from the video, presenting "a real-time tracker" as proof, the platform responded via Twitter that the disparity in the view count was a direct result of their verification process which determines whether views are real or bot-generated and then filters them accordingly. The music video became BTS' 17th to cross 200 million views, doing so on October 16, 2020.

In the video, RM is shown standing before a ruined boat surrounded by various animals; Jin rescues an injured dove—which he later revives—from a war-torn battlefield; Suga stands in a middle of a cult; J-Hope is inside a forest filled with broken trees as Jungkook's dying body lies behind him; Jimin is near a boy with a drum; V takes a blindfold off of a little girl; and Jungkook is seen running from a prison wearing thorny handcuffs. In front of V, a stone gateway opens to reveal a rock that resembles Pride Rock in The Lion King. Everyone except Jungkook arrives at the gates, while Jungkook removes his handcuffs and blows into a conch shell before the video cuts to a fortified base where BTS performs the dance break as meteors fall down around them. Trees around the rock began to shape into place, and Jungkook finds the group as they ascend the rock. The video ends with the text "No More Dream" (their debut single) that fades into only "Dream".

The making of the second video was released on March 2, 2020.

== Credits and personnel ==
Credits adapted from liner notes of Map of the Soul: 7.

- BTS – primary vocals
  - RM – songwriting, rap arrangement, recording engineer
  - Suga – songwriting
  - J-Hope – songwriting
  - Jungkook – chorus
- Pdogg – production, songwriting, keyboard, synthesizer, vocal arrangement, rap arrangement, recording engineer, digital editing
- Antonina Armato – songwriting
- August Rigo – songwriting
- Julia Ross – songwriting
- Krysta Youngs – songwriting
- Michel Schulz – songwriting
- Melanie Joy Fontana – songwriting, chorus
- Paul Addleman – direction assistance
- Bianca Arriaga – drums
- Del Atkins – bass
- Emma Atkins – drums
- Chris Badroos – horn
- Duane Benjamin – orchestra conduction
- Dedrick Bonner – choir direction, choir
- Haley Breland – horn
- Tym Brown – choir
- Rastine Calhoun – horn
- Christopher Calles – horn
- Clayton Cameron – drums
- Cherene Cexil – choir
- Siobhan Chapman – drums
- Matthew Chin – horn
- Justin Cole – drums
- Kayla Collins – choir
- Meloney Collins – choir direction assistance
- Jason de Leon – drums
- DJ Riggins – mix engineer
- Matthew Espinoza – horn
- Ken Fisher – associate direction
- James Ford – horn
- Kia Dawn Fulton – choir
- Diana Greenwood – drum
- Summer Greer – choir
- Enniss Harris – horn
- Spencer Hart – horn
- Jaycen Joshua – mix engineer
- Brenden Kersey-Wilson – horn
- Moiro Konchellah – choir
- Sam Kredich – horn
- Evan Mackey – horn
- Jesus Martinez – horn
- Chadaé McAlister – choir
- Collin McCrary – horn
- Kevin McKeown – direction
- Katie Osborn – horn
- Marcus Perez – horn
- Samuel Pounds – choir
- Erik Reichers – recording engineer
- Jacob Richards – mix engineer
- Ken Sarah – drums
- Max Seaberg – mix engineer
- Walter Simonsen – drums
- Michael Stranieri – horn
- Joshua Von Bergmann – drums
- Alex Williams – recording engineer
- Amber Wright – choir
- Young – guitar
- Zakiya Young – choir

== Charts ==
=== Weekly charts ===
Weekly chart performance
Chart (2020–2022)	Peak position
Argentina Hot 100 (Billboard)	40
Australia (ARIA)	29
Canada Hot 100 (Billboard)	18
Czech Republic Singles Digital (ČNS IFPI)	64
Estonia (Eesti Tipp-40)	15
Euro Digital Song Sales (Billboard)	3
Greece (IFPI)	27
Hong Kong (HKRIA)	1
Hungary (Single Top 40)	1
Hungary (Stream Top 40)	16
Ireland (IRMA)	22
Japan Hot 100 (Billboard)	8
Lithuania (AGATA)	18
Malaysia (RIM)	1
New Zealand Hot Singles (RMNZ)	4
Scottish Singles Sales (Official Charts)	3
Singapore (RIAS)	3
South Korea (Gaon)	1
UK Singles (Official Charts)	21
UK Independent (Official Charts)	1
US Billboard Hot 100	4
US World Digital Song Sales (Billboard)	1
US Rolling Stone Top 100	7
Vietnam (Vietnam Hot 100)	96

Remix with Sia
Chart (2020)	Peak position
Austria (Ö3 Austria Top 40)	23
Belgium (Ultratip Bubbling Under Flanders)	20
Belgium (Ultratip Bubbling Under Wallonia)	23
Czech Republic Singles Digital (ČNS IFPI)	30
France (SNEP)	51
Germany (GfK)	36
Italy (FIMI)	53
Netherlands (Single Top 100)	51
Switzerland (Schweizer Hitparade)	27

=== Yearly ===
Year-end chart performance
Chart (2020)	Position
Hungary (Single Top 40)	59
Japan (Japan Hot 100)	84
South Korea (Gaon)	20
Chart (2021)	Position
South Korea (Gaon)	157

== Accolades ==
Awards and nominations for "On"
Year	Organization	Award	Result	Ref.
2020	Melon Music Awards	Best Rap/Hip Hop	Nominated	
2020	MTV Video Music Awards	Best K-Pop Video	Won	
2020	MTV Video Music Awards	Best Pop Video	Won	
2020	MTV Video Music Awards	Best Choreography	Won	
2020	Nickelodeon Mexico Kids' Choice Awards	Global Hit	Won	
2020	Rockbjörnen	Foreign Song of the Year	Won	
2020	Joox Malaysia Top Music Awards	Top 5 Hits of the Year: K-Pop	Won	
2021	Gaon Chart Music Awards	Song of the Year – February	Won	
2021	Hito Music Awards	Asian Song of the year	Won	

Music program awards
Program	Date (16 total)	Ref.
Music Bank	February 28, 2020	
Music Bank	March 6, 2020	
Music Bank	March 13, 2020	
Music Bank	March 20, 2020	
Show! Music Core	February 29, 2020	
Show! Music Core	March 7, 2020	
Show! Music Core	March 14, 2020	
Show! Music Core	March 21, 2020	
Show! Music Core	March 28, 2020	
Inkigayo	March 1, 2020	
Inkigayo	March 8, 2020	
Inkigayo	March 15, 2020	
Show Champion	March 4, 2020	
Show Champion	March 11, 2020	
Show Champion	March 18, 2020	
M Countdown	March 5, 2020	

Melon Popularity Award
Award	Date	Ref.
Weekly Popularity Award	March 2, 2020	
Weekly Popularity Award	March 9, 2020	
Weekly Popularity Award	March 16, 2020	
Weekly Popularity Award	March 23, 2020	
Weekly Popularity Award	March 30, 2020	

== Certifications ==
Certifications and sales
Region	Certification	Certified units/sales
Australia (ARIA)	Gold	35,000^{‡}
France (SNEP)	Gold	100,000^{‡}
New Zealand (RMNZ)	Gold	15,000^{‡}
South Korea	—	34,484
United Kingdom (BPI)	Silver	200,000^{‡}
United States (RIAA)	Gold	500,000^{‡}
Streaming
Japan (RIAJ)	Platinum	100,000,000^{†}
South Korea (KMCA)	Platinum	100,000,000^{†}
^{‡} Sales+streaming figures based on certification alone.^{†} Streaming-only figures based on certification alone.

== See also ==
- List of Billboard Hot 100 top-ten singles in 2020
- List of Gaon Digital Chart number ones of 2020
- List of M Countdown Chart winners (2020)
- List of Music Bank Chart winners (2020)
- List of number-one digital songs of 2020 (U.S.)
- List of number-one songs of 2020 (Malaysia)
- List of UK Independent Singles Chart number ones of 2020
