= Block B discography =

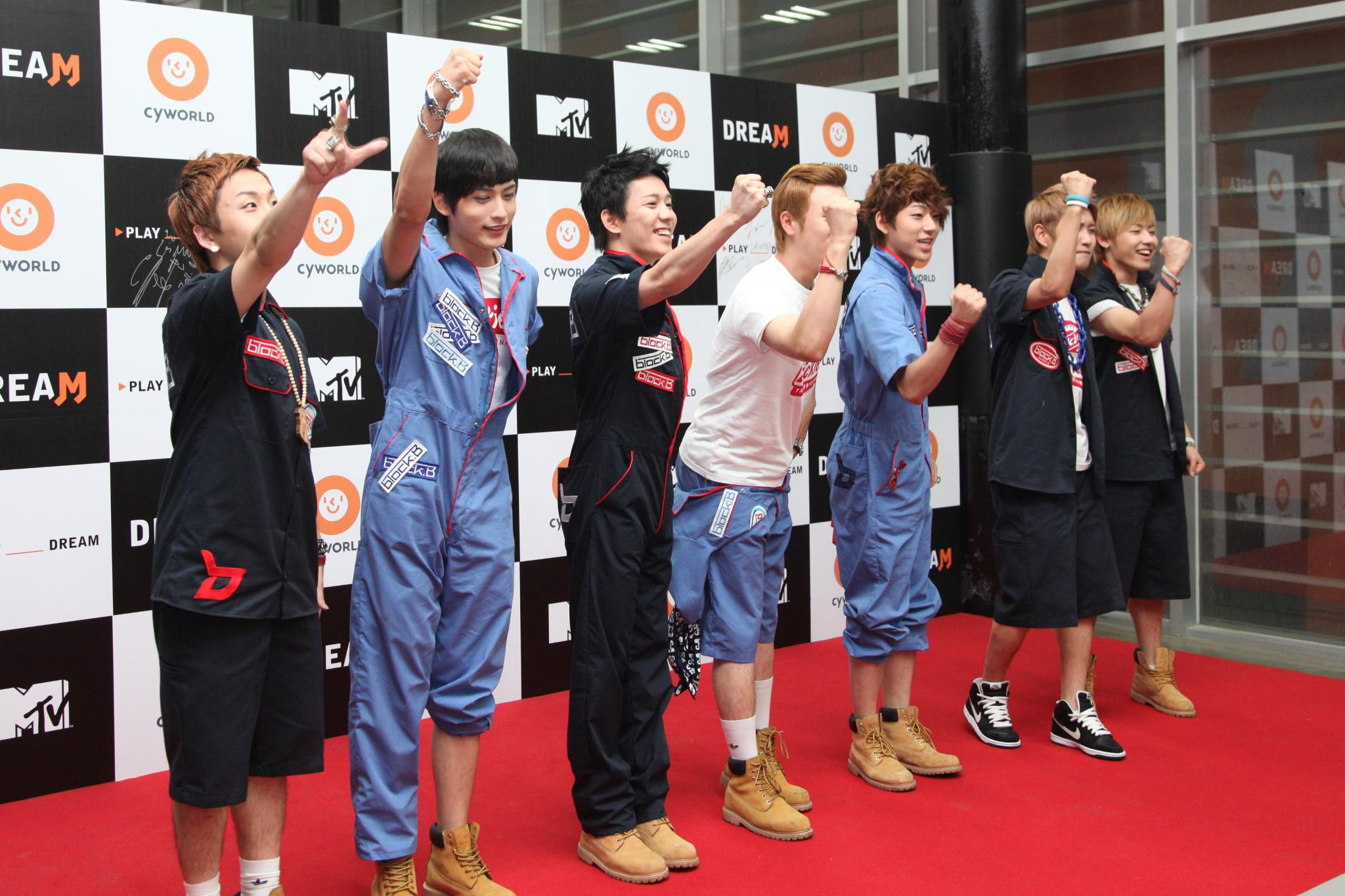
- From the left: Taeil, Jaehyo, Kyung, P.O., Zico, B-Bomb, U-Kwon
- Studio albums: 2
- Extended plays: 7
- Compilation albums: 1
- Music videos: 14
- Single albums: 8
- Promotional singles: 13

The following is the discography of the seven-member South Korean boy band Block B which consists of two studio albums, seven extended plays, eight single albums, and thirteen promotional singles.

== Albums ==
=== Studio albums ===
Title	Album details	Peak chart positions				Sales
Title	Album details	KOR	JPN	JPN Hot	US World	Sales
Blockbuster	Released: October 17, 2012 (KOR); Label: Stardom Entertainment, LOEN Entertainment; Format: CD, digital download	4	—	—	10	KOR: 48,923; JPN: 1,358
My Zone	Released: October 26, 2016 (JPN); Label: Seven Seasons, King Records; Formats: CD, CD+DVD	—	7	8	—	JPN: 22,344
"—" denotes releases that did not chart.

=== Compilation albums ===
Title	Album details	Peak chart positions		Sales
Title	Album details	JPN	JPN Hot	Sales
Block B The Best	Released: June 20, 2018 (JPN); Label: Seven Seasons, King Records; Formats: CD, digital download	14	22	JPN: 3,669

=== Single albums ===
Title	Album details	Peak chart positions			Sales
Title	Album details	KOR	JPN	JPN Hot	Sales
Do You Wanna B?	Released: April 14, 2011 (KOR); Label: Brand New Stardom; Format: Digital download	—	—	—	
Jackpot	Released: April 17, 2014 (KOR); Label: Seven Seasons, CJ E&M Music and Live; Format: CD (Limited Edition)	1	—	—	KOR: 27,421
Very Good	Released: January 21, 2015 (JPN); Label: Seven Seasons, King Records; Format: CD, digital download	—	5	7	JPN: 34,311
H.E.R	Released: May 27, 2015 (JPN); Label: Seven Seasons, King Records; Format: CD, digital download	—	7	10	JPN: 30,722
Jackpot	Released: February 24, 2016 (JPN); Label: Seven Seasons, King Records; Format: CD, digital download	—	5	7	JPN: 25,683
Toy	Released: June 15, 2016 (JPN); Label: Seven Seasons, King Records; Format: CD, digital download	—	2	4	JPN: 47,303
Yesterday	Released: March 29, 2017 (JPN); Label: Seven Seasons, King Records; Format: CD, digital download	—	7	17	JPN: 20,653
Block B Project-1	Released: September 20, 2017 (JPN); Label: Seven Seasons, King Records; Format: CD, digital download	—	7	76	JPN: 7,259
"—" denotes releases that did not chart.

== Extended plays ==
Title	Details	Peak chart positions				Sales
Title	Details	KOR	JPN	JPN Hot	US World	Sales
New Kids on the Block	Released: June 23, 2011 (KOR); Label: Brand New Stardom, LOEN Entertainment; Format: CD, digital download	3	—	—	—	KOR: 24,598
Welcome to the Block	Released: February 2, 2012 (KOR); Re-released: April 30, 2012 (Repackage); Label: Stardom Entertainment, LOEN Entertainment; Format: CD, digital download	3	—	—	—	KOR: 54,674
Very Good	Released: October 2, 2013 (KOR); Label: Seven Seasons, CJ E&M Music and Live; Format: CD, digital download	1	—	—	6	KOR: 64,604
H.E.R	Released: July 24, 2014 (KOR); Re-released: September 3, 2014 (Special Edition); Label: Seven Seasons, CJ E&M Music and Live; Format: CD, digital download	2	—	—	6	KOR: 86,547
Blooming Period	Released: April 11, 2016 (KOR); Label: Seven Seasons, CJ E&M Music and Live; Format: CD, digital download	1	52	81	4	KOR: 56,737
Montage	Released: November 7, 2017 (KOR); Repackaged (Re:Montage): January 8, 2018; Label: Seven Seasons; Format: CD, digital download	5	—	97	11	KOR: 51,472
Montage ~Japan Edition~	Released: December 6, 2017 (JPN); Label: King Records; Format: CD, digital download	—	7	10	—	JPN: 13,853
"—" denotes releases that did not chart.

== Singles ==
Title	Year	Peak chart positions			Sales	Album
Title	Year	KOR	KOR Hot	US World	Sales	Album
"Freeze!" (그대로 멈춰라!)	2011	70	—	—	KOR (DL): 100,043	Do U Wanna B?
"Wanna B"	2011	—	—	—		Do U Wanna B?
"Tell Them" (가서 전해)	2011	103	—	—	KOR (DL): 118,682	New Kids On The Block
"NalinA" (난리나)	2012	11	15	3	KOR (DL): 1,810,071	Welcome To The Block
"I’ll Close My Eyes" (눈감아줄께)	2012	10	20	—	KOR (DL): 313,725	Welcome To The Block (repackaged)
"Nillili Mambo" (닐리리맘보)	2012	10	10	6	KOR (DL): 1,061,419	Blockbuster
"Be the Light" (빛이 되어줘)	2013	14	25	6	KOR (DL): 295,986	Very Good
"Very Good"	2013	6	10	4	KOR (DL): 535,031	Very Good
"Jackpot"	2014	5	—N/a*	7	KOR (DL): 681,537	H.E.R
"H.E.R"	2014	2	—N/a*	4	KOR (DL): 1,535,923	H.E.R
"A Few Years Later" (몇 년 후에)	2016	3	—N/a*	6	KOR (DL): 529,850	Blooming Period
"Toy"	2016	2	—N/a*	5	KOR (DL): 913,927	Blooming Period
"Yesterday"	2017	1	—N/a*	5	KOR (DL): 1,128,432	Non-album single
"Shall We Dance"	2017	17	98	5	KOR (DL): 168,928	Montage
"Don't Leave" (떠나지마요)	2018	30	28	—		Re:Montage
"—" denotes releases that did not chart. * Billboard stopped updating the K-pop Hot 100 in June 2014, then reinstated it in December 2017.

== Soundtrack appearances ==
Title	Year	Peak chart positions		Album
Title	Year	KOR	KOR Hot	Album
"Ppappappappa" (빠빠빠빠)	2011	—	—	All My Love Special OST
"Burn Out"	2012	45	88	Ghost OST
"Your Umbrella" (너의 우산)	2012	95	72	The Thousandth Man OST
"Secret Door (Org Ver.)"	2014	96	—	Secret Door OST
"—" denotes releases that did not chart.

== Other charted songs ==
Title	Year	Peak chart positions		Sales	Album
Title	Year	KOR	KOR Hot	Sales	Album
"Synchronization 100%"	2012	62	32	KOR (DL): 57,109	Welcome to the Block
"Did You or Did You Not"	2012	80	70	KOR (DL): 56,908	Welcome to the Block
"Action"	2012	108	—		Welcome to the Block
"LOL"	2012	113	98		Welcome to the Block
"ACTION (RMX)"	2012	191	—		Welcome to the Block (Repackage)
"Romantically"	2012	51	29	KOR (DL): 115,481	Blockbuster
"Where Are You"	2012	57	47	KOR (DL): 102,255	Blockbuster
"11:30"	2012	58	55	KOR (DL): 99,987	Blockbuster
"Movie's Over"	2012	68	76	KOR (DL): 86,114	Blockbuster
"Mental Breaker"	2012	69	87	KOR (DL): 84,842	Blockbuster
"No Joke"	2012	71	97	KOR (DL): 82,387	Blockbuster
"Interlude"	2012	135	—		Blockbuster
"Halo"	2012	175	—		Blockbuster
"Did You or Did You Not"	2012	185	—		Blockbuster
"When Where How"	2013	20	48	KOR (DL): 125,016	Very Good
"Nice Day"	2013	26	57	KOR (DL): 60,287	Very Good
"Very Good (Inst.)"	2013	180	—		Very Good
"Extraordinary Woman" (보기 드문 여자)	2014	16	—N/a	KOR (DL): 339,779	H.E.R
"Hold Me Now" (이제 날 안아요)	2014	28	—N/a	KOR (DL): 97,617	H.E.R
"Very Good (Rough Ver.)"	2014	80	—N/a	KOR (DL): 24,758	H.E.R
"Walkin' in the Rain"	2016	16	—N/a	KOR (DL): 257,436	Blooming Period
"It Was Love" (사랑이었다)	2016	17	—N/a	KOR (DL): 254,153	Blooming Period
"Bingle Bingle" (빙글빙글)	2016	52	—N/a	KOR (DL): 52,855	Blooming Period
"My Zone"	2017	80	—N/a	KOR (DL): 25,675	Montage
"일방적이야 (One Way)"	2017	59	—N/a	KOR (DL): 31,764	Montage
"이렇게 (Like This) (Vocal Unit)"	2017	—	—N/a	KOR (DL): 16,413	Montage
"—" denotes releases that did not chart. * Billboard stopped updating the K-pop Hot 100 in June 2014.

== Music videos ==
Year	Title	Album	Director
Korean
2011	"Freeze"	Do U Wanna B?	METAOLOS
2011	"Tell Them"	New Kids On The Block	Zanybros
2012	"NalinA"	Welcome To The Block	Purple Straw Films
2012	"Close My Eyes"	Welcome To The Block (Repackage)	Unknown
2012	"Action (RMX)"	Welcome To The Block (Repackage)	Unknown
2012	"Nillili Mambo"	Blockbuster	Purple Straw Films
2013	"Very Good"	Very Good	Purple Straw Films
2013	"Be The Light"	Very Good	Purple Straw Films
2014	"Jackpot"	H.E.R	Purple Straw Films
2014	"H.E.R"'	H.E.R	Tiger Cave
2016	"A Few Years Later"	Blooming Period	Tiger Cave
2016	"Toy"	Blooming Period	Lumpens
2017	"Yesterday"	Non-album single	Tiger Cave
2017	"Shall We Dance"	Montage	Han Samin
2018	"Don't Leave"	RE:Montage	SUNNYVISUAL
Japanese
2015	"Very Good (Japanese version)"	My Zone	Takeshi Maruyama
2015	"H.E.R (Japanese version)"	My Zone	Unknown
2016	"Jackpot (Japanese version)"	My Zone	Purple Straw Films
2016	"Toy (Japanese version)"	My Zone	Lumpens
2016	"My Zone"	My Zone	Yeom Ji Been
2017	"Yesterday (Japanese version)"	Non-album single	Tiger Cave

== See also ==
- Bastarz discography
- T2U discography
- Zico discography
- Park Kyung discography
- P.O discography
- Taeil discography
