= Zico discography =

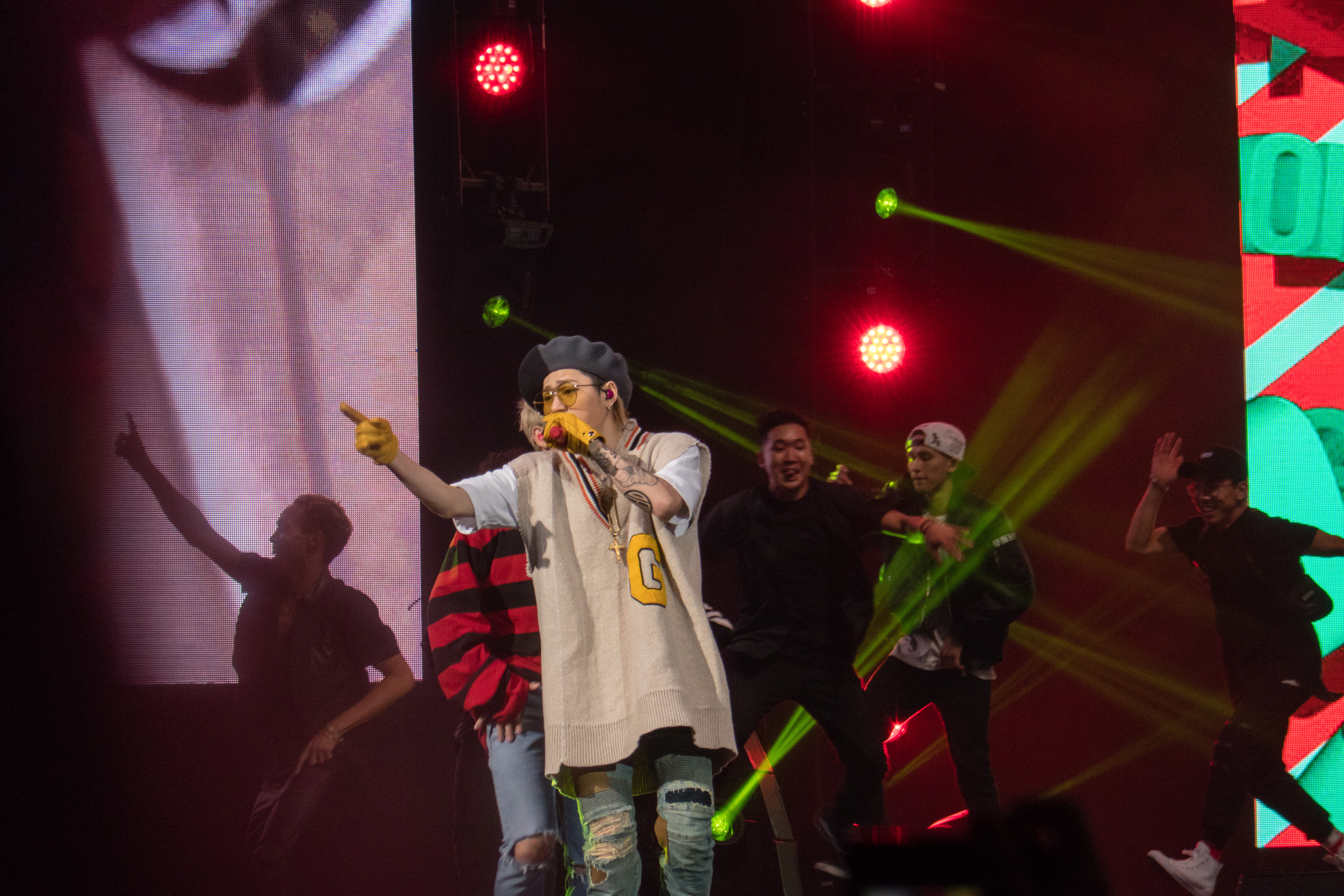
- Zico at 2016 KCON LA
- Studio albums: 1
- EPs: 4
- Singles: 65
- Music videos: 28

South Korean rapper, producer and singer-songwriter Woo Ji-ho, better known by his stage name Zico, has released one studio album, four extended plays, and twenty singles. He debuted in 2011 as leader of the boy group Block B, departing the group's label in November 2018 following the end of his contract. He released his first extended play Gallery on December 7, 2015.

Zico is notable for his successful crossover skills in the Korean hip hop scene, maintaining an underground reputation along with mainstream appeal as a Korean idol. He is also a producer of both K-pop and Korean hip hop music. He is part of the hip-hop crew Fanxy Child.

== Studio albums ==
Title	Details	Peak chart positions	Sales
Title	Details	KOR	Sales
Thinking	Thinking Part.1; Released: September 30, 2019; Label: KOZ Entertainment; Formats: digital download	3	KOR: 12,906
Thinking	Thinking Part.2; Released: November 8, 2019; Label: KOZ Entertainment; Formats: CD, Digital download	3	KOR: 12,906

== Extended plays ==
Title	Details	Peak chart positions		Sales
Title	Details	KOR	US World	Sales
Gallery	Released: December 7, 2015; Re-released: January 25, 2016 (Limited Edition); Label: Seven Seasons, CJ E&M Music; Formats: CD, digital download; Track listing: 1. "Veni Vidi Vici" (feat. DJ Wegun); 2. "Eureka" (유레카) (feat. Zion.T); 3. "Pride and Prejudice" (오만과 편견) (feat. Suran); 4. "Boys and Girls" (feat. Babylon); 5. "Predator" (날) (feat. JTONG); 6. "Tell Me Yes Or No" (말해 Yes Or No) (feat. Penomeco, The Quiett)	4	—	KOR: 35,439
Television	Released: July 12, 2017; Label: Seven Seasons, CJ E&M Music; Formats: CD, digital download; Track listing: 1. "Behind the Scene" (천재); 2. "Artist"; 3. "Anti" (feat. G.Soul); 4. "Fanxy Child" (feat. Fanxy Child); 5. "She's a Baby"; 6. "Bermuda Triangle" (feat. Crush & Dean) (CD only)	3	3	KOR: 18,330
Random Box	Released: July 1, 2020; Label: KOZ Entertainment, Kakao M; Formats: CD, digital download	8	—	KOR: 19,615
Grown Ass Kid	Released: July 27, 2022; Label: KOZ Entertainment, YG Plus; Formats: CD, digital download; Track listing: 1. "Freak" (괴짜); 2. "Seoul Drift"; 3. "Trash Talk" (feat. Changmo); 4. "OMZ Freestyle"; 5. "Nocturnal Animals" (feat. Zior Park)	11	—	KOR: 16,085
"—" denotes releases that did not chart or were not released in that region.

== Singles ==
=== As lead artist ===
Title	Year	Peak chart positions										Sales	Certifications	Album
Title	Year	KOR	KOR Billb. (Note: Includes the Billboard K-pop Hot 100 (discontinued between July 16, 2014 and June 4, 2017 and since April 30, 2022), and the subsequent South Korea Songs chart (launched in May 7, 2022).)	HK	JPN Hot	MLY	NZ Hot	SGP	TWN	US World	WW	Sales	Certifications	Album
"Tough Cookie" (featuring Don Mills)	2014	13	—	—	—	—	—	—	—	—	—	KOR: 293,617	—N/a	Non-album singles
"Well Done" (featuring Ja Mezz)	2015	9	—	—	—	—	—	—	—	—	—	KOR: 204,204	—N/a	Non-album singles
"Say Yes or No" (feat. Penomeco and The Quiett)	2015	3	—	—	—	—	—	—	—	—	—	KOR: 434,012	—N/a	Gallery
"Boys and Girls" (featuring Babylon)	2015	1	—	—	—	—	—	—	—	—	—	KOR: 2,500,000	—N/a	Gallery
"Eureka" (featuring Zion.T)	2015	1	—	—	—	—	—	—	—	11	—	KOR: 1,179,652	—N/a	Gallery
"Pride and Prejudice" (featuring Suran)	2015	14	—	—	—	—	—	—	—	19	—	KOR: 225,727	—N/a	Gallery
"I Am You, You Are Me"	2016	1	—	—	—	—	—	—	—	4	—	KOR: 1,573,331	—N/a	Break Up 2 Make Up
"Bermuda Triangle" (featuring Dean and Crush)	2016	2	—	—	—	—	—	—	—	3	—	KOR: 834,304	—N/a	Television
"She's a Baby"	2017	4	—	—	—	—	—	—	—	4	—	KOR: 806,789	—N/a	Television
"Artist"	2017	3	78	—	—	—	—	—	—	—	—	KOR: 1,010,696	—N/a	Television
"Anti"	2017	12	—	—	—	—	—	—	—	—	—	KOR: 236,881	—N/a	Television
"SoulMate" (featuring IU)	2018	1	—	—	—	—	—	—	—	—	—	—N/a	—N/a	Non-album single
"Daredevil" (featuring Jvcki Wai and Yumdda)	2019	20	—	—	—	—	—	—	—	—	—	—N/a	—N/a	Thinking Part 1
"Human"	2019	27	—	—	—	—	—	—	—	—	—	—N/a	—N/a	Thinking Part 1
"Being Left" (featuring Dvwn)	2019	62	—	—	—	—	—	—	—	—	—	—N/a	—N/a	Thinking Part 2
"Any Song"	2020	1	1	—	—	8	34	7	—	4	—	US: 2,000	KMCA: Platinum	Random Box
"Summer Hate" (featuring Rain)	2020	2	—	—	—	—	—	—	—	—	—	—N/a	—N/a	Random Box
"Seoul Drift"	2022	107	—	—	—	—	—	—	—	—	—	—N/a	—N/a	Grown Ass Kid
"Freak" (괴짜)	2022	102	—	—	—	—	—	—	—	—	—	—N/a	—N/a	Grown Ass Kid
"Spot!" (featuring Jennie)	2024	1	1	2	69	6	5	7	2	1	24	US: 1,000; WW: 5,000	—N/a	Non-album singles
"Duet" (with Lilas Ikuta)	2025	39	—	—	64	—	—	—	—	—	—	—N/a	—N/a	Non-album singles
"Yin and Yang" (with Crush)	2026	133	—	—	—	—	—	—	—	—	—	—N/a	—N/a	Non-album singles
"Tic Tac Toe" (with Onew)	2026	1	—	—	—	—	—	—	—	—	—	—N/a	—N/a	Chaggag
"—" denotes releases that did not chart or were not released in that region.

=== Collaborations ===
Title	Year	Peak chart positions	Sales	Album
Title	Year	KOR	Sales	Album
"Brilliant Is" (with Geeks, Mad Clown, Swings, SKULL, Double K and Zizo)	2013	75	—N/a	Brilliant Is
"Feel So Young (Doraego Remix) (with Crush, Ugly Duck)	2013	—	—N/a	Non-album singles
"Dark Panda" (with Hyolyn and Paloalto)	2015	39	KOR: 72,693	Non-album singles
"Turtle Ship (Remix)" (with Paloalto, G2, B-Free and Okasian)	2015	23	KOR: 135,551	Non-album singles
"By My Side" (with Jeong Jun-ha, featuring Kim Jong-wan)	2016	12	KOR: 266,201	Non-album singles
"Y" (Fanxy Child)	2019	159	—N/a	Non-album singles
"Refresh" (with Kang Daniel)	2020	113	—N/a	Non-album singles
"—" denotes releases that did not chart or were not released in that region.

=== As featured artist ===
Title	Year	Peak chart positions			Sales	Album
Title	Year	KOR	KOR Billb.	US World	Sales	Album
"And the Winner Is…" (Cho PD feat. Zico and Outsider)	2010	—	—	—	—N/a	Part 1 – State of the Art
"Outsider" (Jeong Sulgi feat. Zico)	2010	—	—	—	—N/a	Miss Terious
"It's All An Act" (Jeong Sulgi feat. Zico)	2010	—	—	—	—N/a	Finally In Place
"Map Music" (Cho PD and Verbal Jint feat. Zico)	2010	—	—	—	—N/a	2 the Hard Way
"Hero" (Bizniz feat. Zico, Park Kyung, L.E.O., Basick, Pento, J'Kyun, SQ, Huckleberry P, B-Free)	2010	—	—	—	—N/a	Ego
"Faddy Robot Foundation" (Vasco, Verbal Jint, Sangchu, Outsider, Junhyung, Joosuc, Hyuna, Zico)	2010	—	—	—	—N/a	Charity single
"Life Goes On" (Hanhae feat. Zico)	2011	—	—	—	—N/a	Eargasm
"Take It Off" (Hanhae feat. Zico)	2011	—	—	—	—N/a	Eargasm
"Finale 2011" (Scotch VIP feat. Zico, Jay Moon, Yammo, VEE X KILLA, Qwala, Mino, Hanhae, Park Kyung)	2011	—	—	—	—N/a	Wake Up
"Mic Ceremony" (i11evn feat. Zico)	2011	—	—	—	—N/a	The Next Top 5
"Bachelor Monkey" (Verbal Jint feat Zico)	2011	—	—	—	—N/a	Go Easy
"Just Follow Me" (Hyuna feat. Zico and Dok2)	2011	—	—	—	—N/a	Bubble Pop!
"Manipulating Women" (Giriboy feat. Zico, Gganmo)	2012	—	—	—	—N/a	Fatal Album II
"Hot MC" (J'Kyun feat. Zico)	2012	—	—	—	—N/a	These Days I Just
"Pride" (Fame-J feat. San E, Jo Hyuna, Okasian, New Champ, Zico)	2012	—	—	—	—N/a	Non-album single
"Out of Breath (Remix)" (Geeks feat. Ugly Duck, Fana, Zion.T, Crucial Star, Zico, and DJ Dopsh)	2012	—	—	—	—N/a	In the Morning
"Give and Take" (JJK feat. Zico)	2012	—	—	—	—N/a	Arrival
"Show StopperS (Remix)" (FANA feat. Zico, Andup, Gganmo, Louie, Ugly Duck, TakeOne, Psycoban, DJ Wegun)	2013	—	—	—	—N/a	Fanattitude
"Red Lipstick" (Hyolyn feat. Zico)	2013	12	—	—	KOR: 98,771	Love & Hate
"Beautiful" (Park Bo-ram feat. Zico)	2014	2	—	—	KOR: 1,047,559	Beautiful
"That XX" (Oltii feat. Zico)	2014	39	—	—	KOR: 215,341	Show Me the Money 3: Bobby vs Olltii
"Oasis" (Crush feat. Zico)	2015	5	—	—	KOR: 1,167,727	Oasis
"Traveler" (f(x) feat. Zico)	2015	24	—	—	KOR: 58,057	4 Walls
"Pour Up" (Dean feat. Zico)	2015	96	—	—	KOR: 25,562	130 mood : TRBL
"Picnic" (Dynamic Duo feat. Zico)	2015	23	—	—	KOR: 97,964+	Grand Carnival
"Beautiful" (C Jamm feat. Zico)	2016	8	—	—	KOR: 370,867	Show Me the Money 5
"Wi-Fi" (Yoon Jong-shin feat. Zico)	2017	79	—	—	KOR: 26,957	Monthly Project 2017 February Yoon Jong-shin
"Yozm Gang" (Young B, Hash Swan, Killagramz, Hangzoo, feat. Zico and Dean)	2017	5	—	—	KOR: 571,720	Show Me the Money 6 Ep. 1
"Where U At" (Killagramz, feat. Dean and Zico)	2017	8	—	—	KOR: 265,774	Show Me the Money 6 Ep. 2
"Search" (Young B and Hangzoo, feat. Car, the Garden and Zico)	2017	11	—	—	KOR: 240,175	Show Me the Money 6 Ep. 3
"Tonight" (Taeyang feat. Zico)	2017	45	—	—	KOR: 37,840	White Night
"Red Sun" (Hangzoo, feat. Zico and Swings)	2017	3	—	—	KOR: 410,643	Show Me the Money 6 Ep. 4
"It's You" (Sam Kim feat. Zico)	2018	88	—	—	—N/a	Sun and Moon
"Rosario" (Epik High feat. CL & Zico)	2021	11	15	11	—N/a	Epik High Is Here Part 1
"Complex" (자격지심) (Be'O feat. Zico)	2022	13	8	—	—N/a	Five Senses
"Eko Eko" (M-Flo featuring Zico, Eill, Verbal)	2025	—	—	—	—N/a	Superliminal
"—" denotes releases that did not chart or were not released in that region.

=== Soundtrack appearances ===
Title	Year	Peak chart positions		Sales	Album
Title	Year	KOR	KOR Billb.	Sales	Album
"Oasis" (with Pia)	2012	85	—	—N/a	Golden Time Soundtrack
"Sick" (with Sojin)	2015	11	—	KOR: 603,199	Mask OST
My Day Is Full Of You (나의 하루는 다 너로 가득해) (with Wendy)	2020	148	—	—N/a	The King: Eternal Monarch OST
"New Thing" (새삥) (featuring Homies)	2022	1	5	—N/a	Street Man Fighter Original Vol.3
"—" denotes releases that did not chart or were not released in that region.

=== Other charted songs ===
Title	Year	Peak chart positions			Sales	Album
Title	Year	KOR	KOR Billb.	US World	Sales	Album
"Moneyflow" (with Song Min-ho and Paloalto)	2015	7	—	—	KOR: 454,442	Show Me the Money 4: Episode 3
"Okey Dokey" (with Song Min-ho)	2015	9	—	—	KOR: 762,975	Show Me the Money 4: Episode 6
"Day" (featuring JTONG)	2015	5	—	—	KOR: 202,995	Gallery
"Veni Vidi Vici" (featuring DJ Wegun)	2015	20	—	16	KOR: 137,393	Gallery
"It Was Love" (featuring Luna of f(x))	2016	5	—	20	KOR: 827,623	Break Up 2 Make Up
"Genius (Behind the Scene)"	2017	36	—	—	KOR: 85,147	Television
"Fanxy Child" (featuring Dean, Penomeco and Crush)	2017	15	—	—	KOR: 437,354	Television
"Actually"	2019	95	84	—	—N/a	Thinking Part 1
"One-man Show" (featuring Sik-K)	2019	117	—	—	—N/a	Thinking Part 1
"Extreme"	2019	125	—	—	—N/a	Thinking Part 1
"Cartoon"	2020	185	—	—	—N/a	Random Box
"—" denotes releases that did not chart or were not released in that region.

== Music videos ==
Year	Title	Album	Director
2014	"Tough Cookie"	—N/a	August Frogs
2015	"Well Done"	—N/a	—N/a
2015	"Dark Panda" (with Hyolyn, Paloalto)	—N/a	Vikings League
2015	"Say Yes or No?"	Gallery	1998 AM
2015	"Boys and Girls" (feat. Babylon)	Gallery	Tiger Cave
2015	"Eureka" (feat. Zion.T)	Gallery	Purple Straw Films
2015	"Pride and Prejudice" (feat. Suran)	Gallery	VISUALSFROM.
2015	"Veni Vidi Vici" (feat. DJ Wegun)	Gallery	August Frogs
2016	"I Am You, You Are Me"	Break Up 2 Make Up	Digipedi
2016	"It Was Love" (feat. Luna (f(x))	Break Up 2 Make Up	SEP
2016	"Bermuda Triangle" (feat. Dean, Crush)	Television	Tiger Cave
2017	"She's a Baby"	Television	Beomjin (VM Project Architecture)
2017	"Artist"	Television	Tiger Cave
2017	"Anti" (feat. G.Soul)	Television	Ziyong Kim; FantazyLab
2018	"SoulMate" (feat. IU)	—N/a	Oui Kim (OUI)
2019	"Daredevil (feat. Jvcki Wai, Yumdda)"	Thinking Part.1	Beomjin (VM Project Architecture)
2019	"Extreme"	Thinking Part.1	BANGJAEYEOB
2019	"Human"	Thinking Part.1	a HOBIN FILM
2019	"Balloon"	Thinking Part.2	Park Yeon
2019	"Left Behind (feat. Dvwn)"	Thinking Part.2	Lee Raekyung (BTS Film)
2020	"Any song"	—N/a	Nuri Jeong (K.U.W)
2020	"Summer Hate (feat. Rain)"	Random Box	Tiger Cave
2020	"Cartoon"	Random Box	Woogie Kim (GDW)
2022	"Seoul Drift"	Grown Ass Kid	Lee Yongseok (WHAT'SWORTH STUDIO)
2022	"Freak"	Grown Ass Kid	Paranoid Paradigm (VM Project Architecture)
2024	"Spot!" (featuring Jennie)	—	Choi Yongseok (Lumpens)
2025	"Duet" (with Lilas Ikuta)	Bang Jae-yeob	
2026	"Yin and Yang" (with Crush)	—	

== Music credits ==
All song credits are adapted from the Korea Music Copyright Association's database unless stated otherwise.

Year	Artist	Song	Album	Lyrics		Music	
Year	Artist	Song	Album	Credited	With	Credited	With
2010	Cho PD	"한국힙합에 바란다"	Victory	Yes	Park Kyung, Cho PD	No	—N/a
2010	Cho PD and Verbal Jint	"Map the music" (feat. Zico)	The Hard Way	Yes	Cho Pd, Verbal Jint	No	—N/a
2010	Cho PD and Verbal Jint	"Origin Of The Species" (feat. Swings, Block B)	The Hard Way	Yes	Park Kyung, Cho Pd, Verbal Jint, Swings	No	—N/a
2010	Jung Seul Gi	"Borandeusi 2"	Gyeolguk Jejari	Yes	Park Kyung	No	—N/a
2010	Jung Seul Gi	"Jubyeonin "	Jubyeonin	Yes	Huh In Chang, Outsider	No	—N/a
2010	Bizniz	"Hero Music"	Ego	Yes	Park Kyung, Bizniz, Leo Kekoa, Basick, J'Kyun, Huckleberry P, B-Free	No	—N/a
2010	Miss S	"It's Not Over"	Pro Miss U	Yes	Park Kyung, Jung Han Hae	No	—N/a
2011	Block B	"Wanna B"	Do U Wanna B	Yes	Park Kyung, Rhymer	No	—N/a
2011	Block B	"Freeze!"	Do U Wanna B	Yes	Park Kyung, Rhymer	No	—N/a
2011	Block B	"Does It Only Happen To Me?"	Do U Wanna B	Yes	Park Kyung	No	—N/a
2011	Block B	"Halo"	New Kids On The Block	Yes	Park Kyung	Yes	Rhymer, Masterkey
2011	Block B	"U Hoo Hoo"	New Kids On The Block	Yes	Park Kyung, Rhymer	No	—N/a
2011	Block B	"Tell Them"	New Kids On The Block	Yes	Park Kyung, Rhymer	Yes	Rhymer, Masterkey
2011	Block B	"Tell Them" (Inst)	New Kids On The Block	No	—N/a	Yes	Rhymer, Masterkey
2011	Verbal Jint	"원숭이띠 미혼남" (feat. Zico)	Go Easy	Yes	Verbal Jint	No	—N/a
2011	Cho PD	"And The Winner Is" (feat. Zico, Outsider)	State Of The Art	Yes	Outsider	No	—N/a
2011	Cho PD	"Thrilla" (feat Zico, Park Kyung & Hanhae)	State Of The Art	Yes	Park Kyung, Jung Han Hae, Cho Pd	No	—N/a
2011	Miss S	"It's Not Over"	Miss Terious	Yes	Park Kyung, Jung Han Hae	No	—N/a
2012	Block B	"Action"	Welcome To The Block Repackage	Yes	Kiggen	Yes	Kiggen
2012	Block B	"Action" (Inst)	Welcome To The Block Repackage	No	—N/a	Yes	Kiggen
2012	Block B	"LOL"	Welcome To The Block Repackage	Yes	Park Kyung	No	—N/a
2012	Block B	"Nanrina "	Welcome To The Block Repackage	Yes	Park Kyung	Yes	Delly Boi
2012	Block B	"100%"	Welcome To The Block Repackage	Yes	Park Kyung, Rhymer	No	—N/a
2012	Block B	"Did You Or Did You Not"	Welcome To The Block Repackage	Yes	Park Kyung	Yes	Delly Boi
2012	J'Kyun	"Hot MC"	요즘그냥	Yes	J'Kyun	No	—N/a
2012	Block B	"Nungamajulkke"	Welcome To The Block Repackage	Yes	Park Kyung	Yes	Park Kyung, Rhythmking
2012	Giriboy	"계획적인 여자"	Fatal Album	Yes	Hong Si Young	No	—N/a
2012	JJK	"Give And Take"	도착	Yes	Ko Jeong Hyeon	No	—N/a
2012	Geeks	"Sum I Cha" (Remix)	2nd Mini Album Repackage	Yes	Park Se Yoon, Zion.T, Sun Ju Kyeong, Kim Kyung Hwan	No	—N/a
2012	Fame-J	"자존심"	자존심	Yes	Okasian, New Champ, San E	No	—N/a
2012	Zico, Pia	"오아시스"	골든타임OST	Yes	Zeenan, Seo Hae Won	No	—N/a
2012	Block B	"11:30"	Blockbuster	Yes	Park Kyung	No	—N/a
2012	Block B	"Interlude"	Blockbuster	No	—N/a	Yes	Poptime, Shin Min Yong
2012	Block B	"Mental Breaker"	Blockbuster	Yes	Stim, Ubeda Marcos	No	—N/a
2012	Block B	"Movie's Over"	Blockbuster	Yes	—N/a	Yes	Kye Bum Joo, Poptime
2012	Block B	"Nillili Mambo"	Blockbuster	Yes	—N/a	Yes	Poptime
2012	Block B	"Dreams Come True" (Romantic)	Blockbuster	Yes	P.O, Cho PD	No	—N/a
2012	Block B	"No Joke"	Blockbuster	Yes	Park Kyung	No	—N/a
2013	D-Unit	"Tell Me What Happened I Love You"	D-Unit Affirmative Chapter 1	Yes	—N/a	No	—N/a
2013	Offroad	"Head Banging"	Head Banging	Yes	Woo Tae Won	Yes	Jin Dae Ho
2013	D-Unit	"Thank You" (feat Beenzino)	Thank You [Single]	Yes	—N/a	Yes	Poptime
2013	Fana	"Show Stoppers" (Remix)	Fanattitude	Yes	Hong Jung Hoon, Hwang Moon Seop, Kang Hyoun Mo, Sun Ju Kyeong, Kim Kyung Hwan, Han Byul	No	—N/a
2013	Block B	"Nice Day"	Very Good	Yes	Park Kyung	Yes	Poptime
2013	Block B	"Very Good"	Very Good	Yes	—N/a	Yes	Poptime
2013	Block B	"Be The Light"	Very Good	Yes	—N/a	Yes	Poptime
2013	Block B	"Three W's And One H"	Very Good	Yes	Park Kyung	Yes	Poptime
2013	Hyolyn	"Red Lipstick"	Love & Hate	Yes	Duble Sidekick	No	—N/a
2014	Block B	"Jackpot"	Jackpot	Yes	—N/a	Yes	Poptime
2014	Block B	"Very Good"	Jackpot	Yes	—N/a	Yes	Poptime
2014	Block B	"Her"	Her	Yes	—N/a	Yes	Poptime
2014	Block B	"Unordinary Girl"	Her	Yes	Park Kyung	Yes	Poptime
2014	Park Bo-ram	"예뻐졌다"	예뻐졌다	Yes	Moon Dae Jin, Park Hye Youn, Rado	No	—N/a
2014	Olltii	"That XX"	Show Me the Money 3 Bobby Vs Olltii	Yes	Olltii, Teddy, G-Dragon	No	—N/a
2014	Zico	"Tough Cookie"	Tough Cookie	Yes	Don Mills	Yes	Poptime
2015	Yuk Ji-dam	"Bam Saiss Ji"	언프리티랩스타 part.1	Yes	Yuk Ji-dam	Yes	Poptime
2015	Zico	"Well Done"	Well Done	Yes	Ja Mezz	Yes	Poptime
2015	Bastarz	"Conduct Zero"	Conduct Zero	Yes	P.O	Yes	Poptime
2015	Zico, Sojin	"It Hurts"	Mask OST	Yes	Sojin	No	—N/a
2015	Crush	"Oasis" (feat. Zico)	Oasis	Yes	Crush	No	—N/a
2015	Song Min Ho, Ja Mezz, Paloalto, Andup	"Geobukseon"	Show Me the Money 4 Episode 2	No	—N/a	Yes	—N/a
2015	Zico, Song Min Ho, Paloalto	"Moneyflow"	Show Me the Money 4 Episode 3	Yes	Song Min Ho, Paloalto	Yes	Poptime
2015	Song Min Ho	"Fear"	Show Me the Money 4 Episode 5	Yes	Song Min Ho	Yes	Poptime
2015	Hyolyn, Zico, Paloalto	"Dark Panda"	Dark Panda	Yes	Hoody, Paloalto, Coke Jazz	No	—N/a
2015	Song Min Ho, Zico	"Okey Dokey"	Show Me the Money 4 Episode 6	Yes	Song Min Ho	Yes	Poptime
2015	Zico	"Yes Or No", (feat. The Quiett)	Yes Or No	Yes	PENOMECO, The Quiett	Yes	Poptime
2015	f(x)	"Traveler"	4 Walls	Yes	JQ, Kim Jin Ju	No	—N/a
2015	Paloalto	"Geobukseon" (Remix)	Geobukseon (Remix)	Yes	Okasian, G2, Paloalto, B-Free	Yes	—N/a
2015	Zico	"Boys and Girls" (feat. Babylon)	Boys and Girls	Yes	—N/a	Yes	Poptime
2015	Zico	"Predator" (Ft. JTONG)	Boys and Girls	Yes	—N/a	Yes	Poptime
2015	Dean	"Pour Up" (feat. Zico)	Pour Up	Yes	Deanfluenza	No	—N/a
2015	Dynamic Duo	"Picnic" (feat. Zico)	Grand Carnival	Yes	Choi Jae Ho, Kim Yun Sung	No	—N/a
2015	Zico	"Veni Vidi Vici"	Gallery	Yes	—N/a	Yes	Poptime
2015	Zico	"Pride And Prejudice"	Gallery	Yes	—N/a	Yes	Poptime
2015	Zico	"Eureka" (feat Zion.T)	Gallery	Yes	Zion.T	Yes	Poptime
2016	Zico	"I Am You, You Are Me"	Zico Special Edition/Break Up 2 Make Up	Yes	—N/a	Yes	Peejay
2016	Zico	"It Was Love" (feat Luna)	Zico Special Edition/Break Up 2 Make Up	Yes	—N/a	Yes	Poptime
2016	Block B	"A Few Years Later"	Blooming Period	Yes	Park Kyung	No	Poptime
2016	Block B	"Toy"	Blooming Period	Yes	—N/a	Yes	Poptime
2016	Block B	"Walkin In The Rain"	Blooming Period	Yes	Park Kyung	No	—N/a
2016	Mighty Mouth	"Nice 2 Meet U" (Prod. By Zico)	Nice 2 Meet U	Yes	Lee Sang Chul, So Jun Sup	Yes	Poptime
2016	Zico, C Jamm	"I'm On One"	Show Me the Money 5 Episode 4	Yes	C Jamm	No	—N/a
2016	Sejeong	"Flower Road" (Prod. Zico)	Jelly Box 꽃길	Yes	—N/a	Yes	Poptime
2016	Zico	"Bermuda Triangle" (feat Crush, Dean)	Bermuda Triangle	Yes	Crush, Deanfluenza	Yes	Poptime, Crush, Deanfluenza
2016	Jeong Jun Ha, Zico	"When You're Tired"	무한도전위대한유산	Yes	—N/a	Yes	Poptime
2017	Block B	"Yesterday"	Yesterday	Yes	Park Kyung	No	—N/a
2017	Yoon Jong-shin	"Wi-Fi"	Monthly Project 2017 February Yoon Jong-shin	Yes	Yoon Jong-shin	No	—N/a
2017	Zico	"Do Whatever You Want"	Zico[부딪쳐]	Yes	—N/a	Yes	Peejay
2017	Psy	"I Luv It"	4X2=8	Yes	Psy	Yes	Psy, Yoo Gun-hyung, Poptime
2017	Millic	"Paradise" (feat. Fanxy Child)	Vida	Yes	Crush, Deanfluenza, Penomeco	Yes	Crush, Deanfluenza, Penomeco, Millic
2017	Zico	"Anti" (feat. G.Soul)	Television	Yes	—N/a	Yes	Poptime
2017	Zico	"Artist"	Television	Yes	—N/a	Yes	Poptime
2017	Zico	"Fanxy Child" (feat. Fanxy Child)	Television	Yes	Crush, Deanfluenza, Penomeco	Yes	Crush, Deanfluenza, Penomeco, Poptime
2017	Zico	"She's A Baby"	Television	Yes	—N/a	Yes	Poptime
2017	Zico	"Genius (Behind The Scene)"	Television	Yes	—N/a	Yes	Poptime
2017	Hangzoo, Young B, Hash Swan, Killagramz	"Things These Days" (feat. Zico, Dean)	Show Me the Money 6 Episode 1	Yes	Hangzoo, Deanfluenza, Hash Swan, Young B, Killagramz	Yes	Poptime, Deanfluenza
2017	Killagramz	"어디"	Show Me The Money 6 Episode 2	Yes	Deanfluenza, Killagramz	Yes	Deanfluenza, Lee Won Seok, Kim Han Sang
2017	Taeyang	"Tonight" (feat. Zico)	White Night	Yes	Kush, Taeyang	No	—N/a
2017	Hangzoo, Young B	"Search"	Show Me the Money 6 Episode 3	Yes	Hangzoo, Young B	Yes	Poptime
2017	Hangzoo	"Red Sun" (feat. Zico, Swings)	Show Me the Money 6 Episode 4	Yes	Hangzoo, Swings	Yes	Poptime, Deanfluenza, Lee Won Seok, Kim Han Sang
2017	Hangzoo	"Turn Around" (feat DJ DOC)	Show Me the Money 6 Episode 5	Yes	Hangzoo, Lee Ha Neul	Yes	Poptime
2017	Block B	"Shall We Dance"	Montage	Yes	Park Kyung	Yes	Poptime
2017	Block B	"One-Sided"	Montage	Yes	Park Kyung	Yes	Poptime, 13
2017	Yoon, Mino	"The Door"	Prison Playbook OST	Yes	Song Min Ho	Yes	Poptime
2018	Block B	"Don't Leave"	Re:Montage	Yes	Park Kyung	No	—N/a
2018	Penomeco	"L.I.E"	L.I.E	No	—N/a	Yes	Poptime, Penomeco
2018	Haon	"Graduation" (feat. Vinxen, Webster B)	Winner	Yes	Bae Yeon Seo, Kim Ha On, Lee Byung Jae	Yes	Poptime
2018	Swings	"Keep Going" (feat. Bewhy, Nafla, Zico) (Prod.Ioah)	Keep Going	Yes	Bewhy, Nafla, Swings	No	
2018	Elo	"Osaka" (feat. Zico)	Gradation Vol.4	Yes	Elo	Yes	Elo
2018	Wanna One	"Kangaroo" (Prod. Zico)	1÷x=1 (Undivided)	Yes	Kang Daniel, Park Woojin, Kim Jaehwan	Yes	Poptime
2018	Crush	"Cereal" (feat. Zico)	Wonderlost	Yes	Crush	Yes	Crush, Stay Tuned
2018	Zico	"Soulmate" (feat. IU)	Soulmate	Yes	—N/a	Yes	Poptime
2018	Jeong Dong Hwan	"Shine Your Star"	미스터 션샤인 Ost Part.9	Yes	Poptime, Kang Min Ji, Jeong Dong Hwan, Popkid 1	Yes	Poptime, Kang Min Ji, Jeong Dong Hwan, Popkid 1
2018	Nafla	"Buckle"	쇼미더머니 777 Final	Yes	Nafla	No	—N/a
2018	Sam Kim	"It's You"	Sun and Moon	Yes	Sam Kim	Yes	Sam Kim
2019	FANXY CHILD	"Y"	Y	Yes	Penomeco, Crush, Dean	Yes	Crush, Penomeco, Deanfluenza, Stay Tuned
2019	X1	"Move"	Emergency: Quantum Leap	Yes	Poptime	Yes	Poptime
2019	Zico	"Daredevil" (feat. Jvcki Wai, Yumdda)	Thinking Part.1	Yes	Jvcki Wai, Yumdda	Yes	Peejay, Jvcki Wai, Yumdda
2019	Zico	"Actually"	Thinking Part.1	Yes	—N/a	Yes	Peejay
2019	Zico	"Human"	Thinking Part.1	Yes	—N/a	Yes	Poptime
2019	Zico	"Extreme"	Thinking Part.1	Yes	—N/a	Yes	Poptime
2019	Zico	"One-man Show" (feat. Sik-K)	Thinking Part.1	Yes	Sik-K	Yes	Poptime
2019	Zico	"Another Level" (feat. Penomeco)	Thinking Part.2	Yes	Penomeco	Yes	Penomeco, GooseBumps
2019	Zico	"Being Left" (feat. Dvwn)	Thinking Part.2	Yes	—N/a	Yes	Brightenlight, Dvwn
2019	Zico	"Dystopia"	Thinking Part.2	Yes	—N/a	Yes	Poptime
2019	Zico	"Balloon"	Thinking Part.2	Yes	—N/a	Yes	Stay Tuned
2019	Zico	"The Language of Flowers" (feat. JeHwi)	Thinking Part.2	Yes	—N/a	Yes	—N/a
2020	Zico	"Any Song"	Any Song	Yes	—N/a	Yes	Poptime
2020	Super Junior	"2YA2YAO!"	Timeless	Yes	—N/a	Yes	Dem Jointz, Poptime
2020	Zico	"Summer Hate" (feat. Rain)	Random Box	Yes	—N/a	Yes	Poptime
2020	Zico	"Cartoon"	Random Box	Yes	—N/a	Yes	Poptime
2020	Zico	"Love & Hate" (feat. Bibi)	Random Box	Yes	—N/a	Yes	Poptime
2020	Zico	"No You Can't"	Random Box	Yes	—N/a	Yes	Poptime
2020	Zico	"Roommate"	Random Box	Yes	—N/a	Yes	Noden
2020	SSAK3	"Beach Again"	Non-album single	Yes	Linda G	No	—N/a
2021	Epik High	"Rosario" (feat. CL & Zico)	Epik High Is Here 上 (Part 1)	Yes	Tablo, Mithra, DJ Tukutz, Michael McGarity, Keta	Yes	Tablo, Mithra, DJ Tukutz, Michael McGarity, Keta
2022	Psy	"Celeb"	Psy 9th	Yes	Psy	Yes	Psy, Yoo Gun-hyung
2022	Be'O	"Complex" (feat. Zico)	Five Senses	Yes	Be'O	Yes	Willy, OBSN, Be'O
2022	Zico	"New Thing" (feat. Homies)	Street Man Fighter Original Vol.3 (Mission by Rank)	Yes	Pop Time, CK, Louie	Yes	Pop Time
2023	Meenoi	"and you" (feat. Zico)	Non-album single	Yes	Meenoi	Yes	Hoi Wave, Meenoi
2023	Dynamic Duo	"Smoke Remix" (feat. Zico, B.I, Jay Park, Changmo, Jessi & Padi)	Non-album single	Yes	Jay Park, B.I, Jessi, Changmo, Choi Ja, Gaeko, Kim John, Ro Jae Kyung	No	—N/a
2023	BoyNextDoor	"One and Only"	Who!	Yes	—N/a	Yes	Pop Time
2023	BoyNextDoor	"But Sometimes"	Why..	Yes	Kako, Song Ho Jung, Jaehyun, Taesan, Woonhak	No	—N/a
2023	Penomeco	"Pew!" (feat. Zico)	Rorschach Part 1	Yes	Penomeco	Yes	Penomeco, Made by Me
2023	Penomeco	"Rindaman" (feat. Zico)	Rorschach Part 1	Yes	Penomeco	Yes	Penomeco, Made by Me
2024	QM	"Got yourself a gun" (feat. Zico)	Ant	Yes	QM	No	—N/a
2024	Zico	"Spot!" (feat. Jennie)	Non-album single	Yes	Eun Hee-young, No Identity	Yes	Eun Hee-young, No Identity
2024	BoyNextDoor	"Earth, Wind & Fire"	How?	Yes	Kako, Myung Jaehyun, Taesan, Woonhak	Yes	Pop Time, Daily, Kako, Yoon Ra Kyung, Myung Jaehyun, Taesan
2024	BoyNextDoor	"Our"	How?	Yes	—N/a	Yes	Pop Time, Xenovibe
2025	Jennie	"Like Jennie"	Ruby	Yes	Jennie, Tayla Parx, Amanda "Kiddo A.I." Ibanez, Thomas Pentz, Jorge Alfonso Sr.	Yes	Jennie, Tayla Parx, Amanda "Kiddo A.I." Ibanez, Thomas Pentz, Jorge Alfonso Sr.
2025	D.O.	"Sing Along!"	Bliss	Yes	D.O.	Yes	No Identity

== See also ==
- Block B discography
