= Welcome 2 Bastarz =

2016 album by Bastarz

EP by Bastarz
- Released: October 31, 2016
- Length: 16:35
- Label: Seven Seasons, CJ E&M Music and Live

Bastarz chronology
Conduct Zero (2015)	Welcome 2 Bastarz (2016)	I'm a Mess (2019)

Welcome 2 Bastarz is the second mini album by South Korean boy group Bastarz (Korean: 바스타즈; stylized BASTARZ), a sub-unit of the group Block B. The album was released on October 31, 2016 and contains five songs, all of which member P.O contributed to in lyrics and some in composition. It was released a year and a half after their debut mini-album Conduct Zero.

== Background ==
The pre-release track "Selfish & Beautiful Girl" and its music video were released on October 24, along with three official teaser images of each member of the group. The song was written, co-composed and co-produced by P.O. The music video is in the style of a dance-centric video game and features English model Alexa O'Brien, who previously featured in South Korean boy group WINNER's EXIT: E album teaser.

On October 27, 2016, Block B's official Twitter account released a teaser for the album, including a video featuring snippets of all the songs and a track list. The group released a teaser for their title single "Make It Rain" on October 28, which was composed and arranged by R'n'B singer and producer Dean, with lyric contributions by P.O. The song was released on October 31 at midnight with the rest of the album.

The group released a surprise video for the track "That's Right" on November 7, made entirely of self-shot footage of the group travelling.

== Production and composition ==
P.O contributed to the lyrics of all songs and the composition of "Selfish & Beautiful Girl", "That's Right", and "The Hidden Picture". B-Bomb co-wrote and co-composed the track "Tightly".

== Track listing ==
Welcome 2 Bastarz track listing
No.	Title	Lyrics	Music	Length
1.	"Selfish & Beautiful Girl"	P.O	P.O, GroovyRoom	3:21
2.	"Make It Rain"	Deanfluenza, P.O	Deanfluenza	3:05
3.	"That's Right"	P.O	P.O, GroovyRoom	2:57
4.	"Tightly"	B-Bomb, P.O, Sumin	B-Bomb, Sumin, 김진호, 최선용	3:22
5.	"The Hidden Picture"	P.O	P.O, 이기, Sweetch, Vincenzo	3:52
Total length:				16:35
