= New Kids on the Block (disambiguation) =

New Kids on the Block is an American boy band, assembled in 1984 in Boston, Massachusetts.

New Kids on the Block may also refer to:

- New Kids on the Block (album), the debut album by boy band New Kids on the Block
- New Kids on the Block Live, the fifth concert tour by boy band New Kids on the Block
- New Kids on the Block (TV series), animated TV series about boy band New Kids on the Block
- "The New Kids on the Block" (The O.C.), an episode of The O.C. (season 2)
- "New Kids on the Block" (Modern Family), an episode of Modern Family (season 11)
- "New Kids on the Block" (The Proud Family: Louder and Prouder), an episode of The Proud Family: Louder and Prouder
- New Kids on the Block, a 2011 EP by Block B

== See also ==
- "New Kid on the Block", episode of The Simpsons
- "New Kids on the Blecch", episode of The Simpsons
- New Kids (disambiguation)
