= Lipstick Prince =

- Genre: Beauty, comedy
- Starring: Kim Hee-chul
- Country of origin: South Korea
- Original language: Korean
- No. of seasons: 2
- No. of episodes: 22

Production
- Executive producer: Kim Ji-wook
- Producers: Han Ri-na; Kim Seo-yeon
- Production location: South Korea
- Production company: Golden Eight Media

Original release
- Network: OnStyle
- Release: December 1, 2016 – June 2, 2017

Lipstick Prince (Korean: 립스틱 프린스) is a South Korean beauty show distributed by OnStyle and premiered on December 1, 2016. The show features 7 idols learning about makeup techniques and applying these new skills either on mannequins or celebrity guests. The show hopes to break the stereotype that makeup is only for females and to encourage discussion of cosmetics, makeovers, and beauty among male idols.

== Format ==
A female celebrity guest, or 'Princess', will discuss the makeup look she would like to try. The cast members will then learn this style from a professional make-up artist before practising their new skills on mannequins. Next, the idols will apply the makeup to the guest in a tag-team style. The guest will not be able to see the finished look until the end.

== Cast ==
On February 27, a representative from OnStyle announced that Block B's U-Kwon and NCT's Doyoung will be leaving the show. Furthermore, they revealed that VIXX's N and NCT's Johnny will be taking their places in the second season of "Lipstick Prince."

- Main Host
  - Heechul (Super Junior)
- Prince
  - Tony An (H.O.T.)
  - P.O (Block B)
  - Eunkwang (BtoB)
  - Shownu (Monsta X)
  - Rowoon (SF9)
  - U-Kwon (Block B)
  - Doyoung (NCT)
  - N (VIXX)
  - Johnny (NCT)

== List of episodes & guests ==
=== Season 1 ===
Episode #	Air Date	Guest(s)	Concept	Prince of the Day	Notes
2016
1	December 1	Park Ha-sun	Femme Fatale Make-up	Eunkwang	
2	December 8	Kim Jin-kyung	I.O.I's Red & Glitter Make-up	Tony An	
3	December 15	Park Na-rae	Son Yejin's Innocence Make-up	Tony An	Astro (Moonbin, Cha Eun-woo) replaced P.O. and U-Kwon for this episode
4	December 22	Irene Kim, Choi Jun-young, Ju Sun-young, Kim Na-rae, Ahn Ah-reum	Christmas Party Make-up	Doyoung	
5	December 29	Bora (Sistar)	Awards Ceremony Make-up	Rowoon	UNIQ's Seungyeon appeared instead of Eunkwang
2017
6	January 5	Seohyun (Girls' Generation)	Strawberry Make-up	P.O	Kangnam and MC Gree replaced Eun-kwang and Ro-woon for this episode
7	January 12	Sandara Park	Harley Quinn Make-up	P.O	
8	January 19	Lee El	Chic Lavender Make-up	U-Kwon	
9	January 26	Nam Bo-ra	Semi Smokey Make-up	P.O	
10	February 2	Song Hae-na, Go So-hyun	Barbie Doll Make-up	Tony's Team	Tony's Team (Tony An, P.O, Doyoung, U-Kwon)
11	February 9	Kim So-hye	Goblin's Yoo In Na Make-up	Shownu	
12	February 16	WJSN (Cheng Xiao, Exy, Bona, Luda, Seola, Eunseo, Dayoung)	Spring Make-up	Shownu	

=== Season 2 ===
Episode #	Air Date	Guest(s)	Concept	Prince of the Day	Notes
2017
1	March 30	Lee Se-young	Hollywood Make-up	Eunkwang	N was not able to participate
2	April 6	Lee Su-hyun (Akdong Musician)	Cat-Like Make-up	Rowoon	N was not able to participate
3	April 13	Sowon, Yerin (GFriend)	Taeyeon "Why" Make-up	Tony An, Seo Eunkwang, Shownu, P.O	N had his first appearance on the show after being absent
4	April 20	Soyou (Sistar)	American Style Make-up	N	
5	April 27	Shim So-young, Lee Jin-yi	Audrey Hepburn Style Make-up	Tony An, N, Johnny, Rowoon	
6	May 5	Hyuna	Orange Crush Make-up	N	For this episode P.O was replaced by Pentagon members Hui and E'Dawn (They are part of Triple H with Hyuna)
7	May 12	Jun Hyo-seong (Secret)	Kira Kira Make-up (sparkly/glitter makeup)	Rowoon	
8	May 19	Nayeong & Sejeong (Gugudan)	Vampire Make-up	Eunkwang, Shownu, P.O, Kim Heechul	
9	May 26	Seol In-ah	Festival Make-up	Shownu	
10	June 2	Chaeyeon & Huihyeon (DIA)	Flower Make-up	Shownu, P.O	
