= Montage (EP) =

- Digital cover

EP by Block B
- Released: November 13, 2017
- Recorded: 2017
- Studio: 821 Sound (Seoul); In Grid (Seoul)
- Genre: K-pop, hip hop
- Length: 16:39
- Language: Korean
- Label: Seven Seasons; Stone

Block B chronology
My Zone (2016)	Montage (2017)	Block B The Best (2018)

Singles from Montage
- 1. "Shall We Dance" Released: November 7, 2017

Singles from Re:Montage
- 1. "Don't Leave" Released: January 8, 2018

Montage is the sixth extended play by South Korean boy band Block B, released on November 13, 2017. The Japanese edition of the album was released on December 6, over a year after their last studio album My Zone. The album includes two singles, one of which is the Korean version of the track "My Zone", originally released in Japanese on the group's My Zone (Japan 1st Album). The other single is "Shall We Dance", the title track, and was released on November 7.

== Background and release ==
Block B previewed the poster for Montage at midnight on October 18, revealing the date of the album's release. On October 26, the group released teaser images for the group and each member. More teaser images were released on October 27 and 28, with the title track being revealed on October 29. On October 31, the title of the album and the track list were revealed. Two more images were released on November 1, of members Park Kyung and Jaehyo, followed by U-Kwon and P.O on November 2, and B-Bomb, Zico, and Taeil on November 3. The teaser for "Shall We Dance" was released on November 4, and on November 5 they released a preview of all five songs from the album on their Instagram page.

Although originally set for release on November 10, the album was postponed until November 13 due to a production delay. The Japanese edition of the album was released on December 6.

== Composition ==
Members Zico, Kyung, and B-Bomb contributed to the composition of the album and lyrics. B-Bomb wrote, co-composed and co-produced his own solo track, "Give & Take", the last track on the album. Kyung and Zico co-wrote lyrics for "Shall We Dance" and "One Sided", while Kyung composed "One Sided" and "Like This", and Zico composed the hip hop song "Shall We Dance" and "My Zone". Poptime also co-produced the song "Shall We Dance" with Zico. Penomeco also contributed to the lyrics for "My Zone".

== Promotion ==
Block B had their comeback stage on Music Bank on November 10 with the title song, "Shall We Dance", and appeared again on the show a week later on November 17 with the same song. They also promoted the song on Inkigayo for two weeks running. "Shall We Dance" debuted at No. 12 on Melon, reached No. 1 on Bugs real-time chart the day after it was released, and charted at No. 50 on the Gaon Singles Chart.

== Track listing ==
No.	Title	Lyrics	Music	Length
1.	"My Zone"	Zico; Penomeco	Zico; Dirty Orange; Mitsu.J	2:57
2.	"Shall We Dance"	Zico; Park Kyung	Zico; Poptime	3:01
3.	"일방적이야" (One-Sided)	Zico; Park Kyung	Park Kyung; 13	3:32
4.	"이렇게" (Like This) (vocal unit)	Park Kyung	Park Kyung; Shim Jaehoon; Park Junghoon	3:51
5.	"Give & Take" (B-Bomb solo)	B-Bomb	B-Bomb; Kim Jinho; Park Hyungyu	3:19

== Chart ==
Chart performance for Montage
Chart (2017)	Peak position
Japan Hot Albums (Billboard Japan)	97
South Korea (Gaon)	5
