= Lee Min-hyuk =

Lee Min-hyuk (Korean: 이민혁) is the name of:

- Lee Min-hyuk (rapper, born 1990), South Korean singer, member of boy band BtoB
- Lee Min-hyuk (singer, born December 1990), or B-Bomb, South Korean singer, member of boy band Block B
- Lee Min-hyuk (singer, born 1993), South Korean singer, member of boy band Monsta X
