= Conduct Zero (EP) =

EP by Bastarz
- Released: April 14, 2015

Conduct Zero is the debut extended play from the South Korean boy group sub-unit Bastarz (Korean: 바스타즈; stylized BASTARZ). It was released on April 14, 2015.

== Background ==
Bastarz's label Seven Seasons released teasers for the group and its members throughout the beginning of April, 2015, with photos of each member and videos. The first teaser video was released on April 2, and the next on April 3. On the same day, Block B leader Zico posted lyrics from the title song "Conduct Zero" on Twitter, and Bastarz member B-Bomb posted a teaser image to his personal Twitter page. The third teaser video, released on April 4, contained the main riff from the title song, as well as the name of the sub-unit. The group released teaser images of all three members together on April 8. On April 9, a teaser video containing snippets of the tracks on the album was released through Seven Season's YouTube page. The title song and album were released together on April 14.

One of the teasers for "Conduct Zero" created controversy for its depiction of women wearing Japanese kimonos in the MV. Fans drew parallels to the wartime sex crimes committed against Korea during the Japanese Occupation and Korean comfort women. The images in the teaser were not released in the final edit of the MV.

== Composition ==
The title track, "Conduct Zero", was composed and arranged by Zico and Seven Seasons producer Poptime, with lyrics by Zico and Bastarz member P.O, and contributions by singer Crush. All three Bastarz members, P.O, B-Bomb and U-Kwon, contributed to the album. B-Bomb and U-Kwon contributed to the chorus of "Nobody But You", and all three members contributed to the chorus of "Thief".

== Track listing ==
No.	Title	Lyrics	Music	Arrangement	Length
1.	"Conduct Zero"	Zico, P.O	Zico, Poptime, Crush	Zico, Poptime	3:14
2.	"Charles Chaplin"	P.O	Groovyroom, 계범주	Groovyroom	3:36
3.	"Thief"	Iggy, Youngbae, Esna, 앙리, P.O	Iggy, Youngbae, Esna, 앙리	이기, 용배	3:26
4.	"Nobody But You"	Xepy	Erik Lewander, Martin Mulholland, Mr Success		4:35
5.	"Sue Me" (featuring Incredivle)	P.O, Incredivle	P.O, Incredivle, Groovyroom	Groovyroom	2:44
6.	"Conduct Zero" (instrumental)		Zico, Poptime, Crush	Zico, Poptime	3:14
