= B-Bomb =

South Korean singer (born 1990)

- 이민혁
- Born: Lee Min Hyuk; December 14, 1990 (age 35); Seoul, South Korea
- Occupations: Singer; dancer; actor
- Musical career
- Genres: R&B; hip hop
- Instrument: Vocals
- Years active: 2011–present
- Member of: Block B, Bastarz

- Korean name
- Hangul: 이민혁
- Hanja: 李敃赫
- RR: I Minhyeok
- MR: I Minhyŏk

Lee Min-hyuk (Korean: 이민혁, born December 14, 1990), better known by the stage name B-Bomb (비범), is a South Korean singer and dancer in the South Korean boy band Block B, and is in the Bastarz sub-unit with U-Kwon and P.O. He also works as a stage actor, using his birth name.

== Biography ==
B-Bomb was born Lee Min-hyuk in Seoul, South Korea.

== Career ==
B-Bomb debuted with Block B in April 2011. In 2015, he joined members U-Kwon and P.O to form the group's first sub-unit, Bastarz. B-Bomb wrote the song "Tightly" for the sub-unit's 2016 second album, Welcome to Bastarz, and received composition credit for three songs on Bastarz' 2019 album, I'm a Mess. B-Bomb also wrote the song "Give & Take," which appears on the Block B album Re: Montage.

As an actor, Lee starred in the 2015 Web drama Jumping Girl, playing the spoiled idol star Seo Ah-shin opposite Jung Ha-na. In 2018, he starred as Danjong of Joseon in the historical play Yeo Do, which ran in early 2018. Lee received high praise for his performance in the show, which had an encore run in May.

In August 2018, B-Bomb became a cast member on JBTC 4's new reality show Awesome Feed, which depicts the daily lives of celebrities.

Along with Park Hyun-kyu of Vromance, B-Bomb composed the song "Don't Be Shy," which was released by the singer It's in May 2019.

On July 2, 2019, B-Bomb made his first Korean solo release, the single "Dawn."

In late September, B-Bomb's label announced that he would begin the military duty required by Korean men on October 10, 2019. B-Bomb finished his term of service and returned home April 17, 2021, with his discharge becoming official April 27.

== Discography ==
=== Singles ===
Title	Year	Album
"Dawn" (feat. jeebanoff)	2019	Non-album single
"Think About 'Chu" (feat. Hanhae)	2019	Non-album single
"Finale"	2019	Non-album single

== Filmography ==
=== Variety shows ===
Year	Title	Notes/Ref.
2017	Leaving	with Jaehyo
2018	Awesome Feed	Cast member
2021	The Best Cooking Secrets	

=== Dramas ===
Year	Title	Role
2015	Jumping Girl	Seo Ah-shin

=== Web series ===
Year	Title	Network	Role
2021	My 100th Election	National Election Commission/MTN	Han Woong

== Theater ==
Year	Title	Role
2018	Yeodo	Danjong
