= Jaehyo =

South Korean singer and actor (born 1990)

- Born: Ahn Jae-hyo; December 23, 1990 (age 35); Busan, South Korea
- Occupations: Singer; actor
- Years active: 2011–present
- Labels: Stardom; Seven Seasons
- Member of: Block B

Korean name
- Hangul: 안재효
- RR: An Jaehyo
- MR: An Chaehyo

Ahn Jae-hyo (Korean: 안재효; born December 23, 1990), known mononymously as Jaehyo (재효), is a South Korean singer and actor. He debuted as a vocalist of the South Korean boy band Block B in April 2011 with the group's first single album, Do U Wanna B?. Outside the group's activities, he has starred in the web series What on Earth Is Going On? (2015) and appeared in the musicals Run to You: Street Life (2015) and In the Heights (2016–2017).

== Early life and education ==
Ahn Jae-hyo was born on December 23, 1990, in Busan, South Korea. He has an older brother. In 2013, Ahn enrolled in the Department of Broadcasting and Entertainment at Global Cyber University.

== Career ==
=== Pre-debut ===
Before his debut, Ahn worked as a fitting model. He was also known as a Busan ulzzang and appeared on the Mnet program Chiyok! Kkonminam Arongsatae (치욕! 꽃미남 아롱사태).

Ahn later trained under Cube Entertainment in preparation for the debut of Beast. An injury sustained during choreography practice required knee surgery, after which he returned home and abandoned his plans to become a singer. At the urging of Lee Joon of MBLAQ, he resumed pursuing a music career as a Block B trainee.

=== 2011–present: Block B and individual activities ===
Jaehyo debuted as a member of Block B in April 2011 with the single album Do U Wanna B?. In October 2012, he made a cameo appearance in the MBC fantasy sitcom The Thousandth Man.

In June 2015, he and fellow Block B member U-Kwon joined the cast of a Japanese production of the musical Run to You, staged in Tokyo. Later that year, he was cast in his first leading role in the web drama Dodaeche Museun Iriya (도대체 무슨 일이야). In December 2016, he was cast as Benny in the South Korean production of In the Heights.

In January 2018, Block B released the reissue Re:Montage, which included Jaehyo's first solo track, "At Last" (마지막 정류장), a Korean-language solo version of "Bus Stop", his 2017 collaboration with Naoko Tanaka.

=== 2023–present: Departure from Seven Seasons and later activities ===
On January 4, 2023, Seven Seasons announced that its exclusive contracts with Jaehyo, B-Bomb, and U-Kwon had ended and would not be renewed. In September 2024, Jaehyo reunited with the other members of Block B for the group's first full-group performance in seven years on The Seasons: Zico's Artist.

In February 2026, he appeared in the short-form fantasy action series Haunted Blade: Hunters (혼검: 헌터스), playing a mysterious watcher possessed by a Joseon-era warrior.

== Personal life ==
=== Health ===
Jaehyo underwent knee surgery in 2015. After Block B's concerts in January 2018, he said that performances continued to cause knee pain and fluid buildup.

=== Military service ===
On December 4, 2018, Seven Seasons announced that Jaehyo would enter a recruit training center on December 20 to begin his mandatory military service. Following his 4 weeks of basic training, he was expected to serve as a social service worker for approximately two years. On the day he entered the training center, Jaehyo posted a handwritten letter to Block B's official fan cafe. He expressed regret that his knee condition prevented him from serving on active duty.

On December 6, 2019, Seven Seasons announced that Jaehyo had been reclassified from Grade 4 to Grade 5. His initial Grade 4 classification, which assigned him to alternative service as a social service worker, was based on chronic injuries affecting his right knee joint, including the lateral femoral cartilage and partial lateral meniscus tear.

During the 3rd week of the basic training he began in December 2018, his condition recurred and he was sent home for treatment. He re-entered basic training on March 21, 2019, but was sent home again that same day after his symptoms returned. After six months of rest and treatment under his physician's supervision, he underwent a medical re-examination at the Busan regional office of the Military Manpower Administration on September 30 and a detailed examination at its Daegu–Gyeongbuk regional office on November 4, which resulted in his Grade 5 classification. This placed him in wartime labor service, exempting him from mandatory service during peacetime but leaving him subject to mobilization during wartime or an equivalent national emergency.

== Discography ==
Solo songs
Title	Year	Album	Ref.
"Bus Stop" (featuring Naoko Tanaka)	2017	Project-1 EP <Type-Red> / <Type-Blue>	
"At Last" (마지막 정류장)	2018	Re:Montage	

== Filmography ==
Acting credits
Year	Title	Role	Ref.
2012	The Thousandth Man	Cameo	
2015	Dodaeche Museun Iriya (도대체 무슨 일이야)	Il-woo	
2026	Haunted Blade: Hunters (혼검: 헌터스)	Yoon Ji-hyun	
