= U-Kwon =

South Korean singer

- 김유권
- Born: Kim Yu-kwon; April 9, 1992 (age 34); Suwon, South Korea
- Occupations: Singer; dancer
- Musical career
- Genres: R&B; hip hop
- Instrument: Vocals
- Years active: 2011–present
- Member of: Block B, Bastarz, T2U

Korean name
- Hangul: 김유권
- Hanja: 金有權
- RR: Gim Yugwon
- MR: Kim Yugwŏn

Kim Yu-kwon (Korean: 김유권, born April 9, 1992), better known by the stage name U-Kwon (유권), is a South Korean singer. He is a vocalist and dancer in Block B; he is also a member of the sub-unit Bastarz along with P.O and B-Bomb, as well as the sub-unit T2u with Taeil.

== Biography ==
U-Kwon was born in Suwon, South Korea.

== Career ==
=== 2011–2016: Career beginnings ===
U-Kwon debuted with Block B in April 2011. Four years later, it was announced that U-Kwon would participate in Block B's first sub-unit, Bastarz, along with members P.O and B-Bomb. The group's first album was released on April 13, 2015, and its second on October 31, 2016. In between, U-Kwon, along with B-Bomb, recorded the song "Bingle Bingle" on the Block B album Blooming Period, which was released April 11, 2016. U-Kwon released his first Japanese solo, "Painless" (痛くない), on June 24, 2016; the song was composed by him for the short vampire film Q Chan, in which he starred.

On June 24, 2016, it was announced that U-Kwon had been cast on the idol-dance competition show Hit the Stage. U-Kwon participated in the show with YooA as his partner. U-Kwon won the premiere episode of the show with a dance routine in which he portrayed the Joker. They ultimately finished fourth.

=== 2017–present: Solo career ===
In June 2017, U-Kwon and fellow Block B member P.O received the Maxim K-Model Icon Idol Award.

U-Kwon performed a seven-show, six-city tour of Japan from August 26 to September 7, 2017, along with fellow Block B member Taeil as the special unit T2u. U-Kwon also took part in the Japanese special project album, Block B: Project-1, released September 20, performing the song "Winner" along with P.O and Japanese rapper Chanmina.

On October 18, it was announced that U-Kwon had been selected to host the music show The Power of K, along with Nancy of Momoland and Shownu of Monsta X. The show began broadcasting January 2018 in both Korea and Japan.

In December 2017, U-Kwon along with the singer Rothy released an OST song for the drama Jugglers entitled "Baby Baby."

On January 8, 2018, Block B released the album Re: Montage featuring a solo song by U-Kwon, "Everythin'." In addition to performing the song, U-Kwon helped write the lyrics. U-Kwon also wrote the Japanese lyrics to the 2018 T2u song "Good Bye," which appears on the Block B The Best album, and the Japanese lyrics to the song "Ocean," which appears on the subunit's debut album, T2U.

On August 12, 2022, during Haha's Twitch stream with him, U-Kwon announced that he left KQ Entertainment and is currently working independently before deciding on an entertainment company to join.

== Personal life ==
U-Kwon announced in December 2012 that he was in a relationship with the model Jun Sun-hye. She announced their breakup on May 1, 2022, saying the two remained friends.

=== Military service ===
In May 2020, it was announced that U-Kwon would begin the military service required of South Korean men on May 18. U-Kwon was discharged from military service on November 21, 2021 without returning to the unit after his last vacation in accordance with the Ministry of Defense guidelines for preventing the spread of COVID-19.

== Discography ==
=== Single albums ===
Title	Details	Peak chart positions	Sales
Title	Details	KOR	Sales
Rise Up	Released: December 3, 2019; Re-released: January 13, 2020 (Limited Edition CD); Label: Seven Seasons; Formats: digital download, CD; Track listing: 1. Rise Up (feat. Koonta); 2. Fuego (feat. RGP)	—	—N/a
Wanna Do	Released: January 6, 2023; Formats: digital download; Track listing: 1. Wanna Do (feat. Woosoo); 2. Wanna Do (Instrumental)	—	—N/a
"—" denotes releases that did not chart or were not released in that region.

=== Singles ===
Title	Year	Album
"Feugo"	2019	Rise Up
"Wanna Do" (featuring. Woosoo)	2023	Non-album singles
"Tough Love"	2024	Non-album singles
"Tú Y Yo"	2026	Non-album singles

=== Soundtrack appearances ===
Title	Year	Peak chart position	Album
Title	Year	KOR	Album
"Baby Baby" (with Rothy)	2017	—	Jugglers
"—" denotes releases that did not chart or were not released in that region.

== Filmography ==
=== Variety shows ===
Year	Title	Notes/Ref.
2016	Hit The Stage	Contestant
2016	Lipstick Prince	Cast member with P.O
2017	Ranking Show 1, 2, 3	Panelist
2018–19	Power of K	Host
2018	Ranking Show 1, 2, 3	Panelist
2019	King of Mask Singer	Contestant (Edison)
2019	Sales King TV	Indonesia trip
2020	Fact in Star	Idol of the Month
2020	Voice Queen	Judge

=== Dramas ===
Year	Title	Role
2015	Jumping Girl	Han Ga-eul
2018	Radio Romance	Kang Minu

=== Film ===
Year	Title	Role	Notes/Ref.
2016	Q Chan (Qちゃん)	Im	Part of the Thrilling Daily Life (スリリングな日常) omnibus

== Musicals ==
Year	Title	Role	Notes/Ref.
2014–15	All Shook Up	Elvis	Seoul production
2015	HARU~If You Can Return to that Day~ (HARU～あの日に戻れるなら～)	Kang Young-won	Tokyo production
2015	Run to You~Street Life~	Suchan	Tokyo production, with Jaehyo
2016–17	In the Heights	Usnavi	Seoul production, with Jaehyo
2017	The Great Catsby	Hound	Seoul production
2018	Evil Dead: The Musical	Scott	Seoul production
2019	By the Age of 30	Jin Yong	Tokyo & Osaka productions
2019	Altar Boyz	Luke	Osaka production
