= New Kids (disambiguation) =

New Kids is a Dutch television show.

It may also refer to:

- The New Kids, a 1985 film
- A series of albums by iKon:
  - New Kids: Begin (2016)
  - New Kids: Continue (2018)
  - New Kids: The Final (2018)
  - The New Kids (album) (2019)

== See also ==
- New Kids on the Block, American musical group
