= T2U =

Sub-unit of boy band Block B

- Origin: Seoul, South Korea; Tokyo, Japan
- Genres: Pop music; R&B
- Years active: 2017–present
- Labels: KQ Entertainment; King Records
- Spinoff of: Block B
- Members: U-Kwon; Taeil

T2U is the second official sub-unit of the South Korean boy band Block B. Established in July 2017, the sub-unit consists of two members: Block B's main vocalist Taeil, and the vocalist and dancer U-Kwon. The sub-unit, which is primarily active in Japan, debuted their first mini album, entitled T2U, on September 26, 2018.

== History ==
T2U first toured Japan in August and September 2017, with seven shows in Nagoya, Osaka, Fukuoka, Saitama, Sendai, and Tokyo. The sub-unit toured Japan again in May 2018, performing in Saitama, Nagoya, Osaka, and Tokyo, and selling out all shows. Additional shows were scheduled for September 2018 in Osaka and Tokyo.

The first T2U singles were two songs included on Block B's Japanese album, Block B The Best, which was released in June 2018. The following month, it was announced that T2U would release the first mini-album under the subunit's name on September 26, 2018. The album included the song "Ocean" as well as solo songs.

== Discography ==
=== Extended plays ===
Title	Album details	Peak chart positions		Sales
Title	Album details	JPN Oricon	JPN Billboard	Sales
Japanese
Ocean	Released: September 26, 2018; Label: Seven Seasons, King Records; Format: CD, digital download	30	—	JPN: 2,261
"—" denotes releases that did not chart or were not released in that region.
