= Lee Tae-il =

South Korean singer

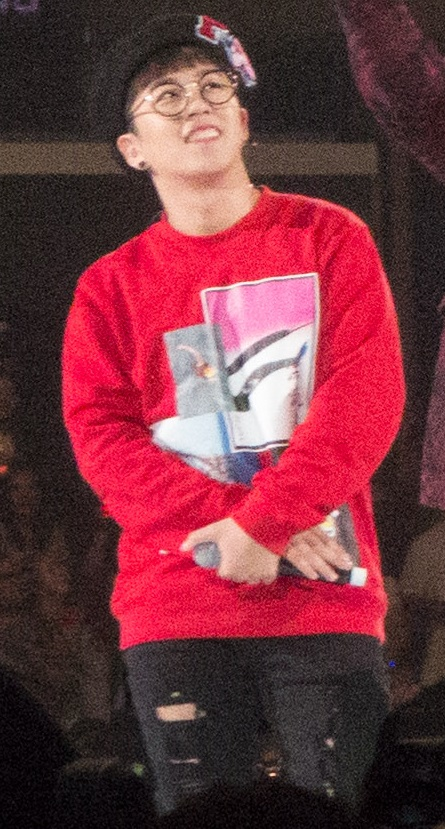
- Taeil in August 2015
- Born: Lee Tae-il; September 24, 1990 (age 35); Seoul, South Korea
- Occupation: Singer
- Musical career
- Genres: R&B; ballad
- Instrument: Vocals
- Years active: 2011–present
- Label: Seven Seasons

Korean name
- Hangul: 이태일
- Hanja: 李泰欥
- RR: I Taeil
- MR: I T'aeil

Lee Tae-il (Korean: 이태일; born September 24, 1990), known mononymously as Taeil, is a South Korean singer, signed under Seven Seasons. He is the main vocalist of boy band Block B and is part of the T2u sub-unit with U-Kwon.

== Biography ==
Lee Tae-il was born in Seoul, South Korea, where he lived with his parents, elder sister and younger brother. He graduated from Global Cyber University and previously attended Kim Myung-ki's Vocal Academy. Prior to joining Block B, he was a contestant on MBC's Star Audition 1.

== Career ==
In addition to his work with Block B, Taeil performed two solo concerts in Tokyo, Japan, on January 13, 2017. He also did a seven-show, six-city tour of Japan from August 26 to September 7, 2017, along with fellow Block B member U-Kwon as the special unit T2u.

In March 2018, Taeil was named as a judge for the Blind Musician singing competition, which is sponsored by the Korea Music Copyright Association, the Federation of Korean Music Performers, and the Korean Entertainment Producers' Association.

Taeil's first solo concert in Korea was announced November 2018 and scheduled to take place on December 22 and 23 in Seoul's Olympic Park K-Art Hall. All tickets sold out almost immediately after going on sale November 28.

In April 2019, it was announced that Taeil and Park Kyung would hold two concerts in Seoul together on May 25 and 26.

On June 10, Taeil announced that he would be entering into South Korea's compulsory military duty immediately. After fulfilling his term of service, Taeil returned home on leave December 4, 2020, with his discharge becoming official the following month.

== Discography ==
=== As lead artist ===
| Title | Year | Peak chart positions | Sales | Album |
| Title | Year | KOR | Sales | Album |
|---|---|---|---|---|
| "Inspiring" (흔들린다) | 2015 | 59 | KOR: 48,543+ | Non-album single |
| "It Was Love" (사랑이었다) | 2016 | 17 | KOR: 182,532+ | Blooming Period |
| "A Doll's Dream" (인형의 꿈) | 2016 | — | KOR: 11,914+ | Woman with a Suitcase OST |
| "Come to Me" (내게 와요) | 2017 | — | —N/a | Radiant Office OST |
| "Easiest Thing To Do" (가장 쉬운 일) | 2017 | — | —N/a | Man Who Dies to Live OST |
| "Fluttering" (설렘각) | 2018 | — | ** | Let's Eat 3 OST |
| "Love Is Magic" (사랑은 마술) | 2018 | — | ** | Magical OST |
| "Later" (잘 있어요) | 2018 | — | ** | Non-album single |
| "Remaining Star" (머무는 별) | 2019 | — | ** | Non-album single |

=== Collaborations ===
| Title | Year | Peak chart positions | Sales | Album |
| Title | Year | KOR | Sales | Album |
|---|---|---|---|---|
| "I Like You, I Don't" (좋아한다 안 한다) with Sejeong | 2017 | 8 | KOR: 155,494+ | Non-album single |
| "Falling You" with Kim So-hee | 2017 | — | —N/a | Meloholic OST |
| "Monologue" with Kim Jong-kook | 2018 | — | ** | The Call Project, No. 1 |
| "rainy day" with Wheesung and Chungha | 2018 | — | ** | The Call Project, No. 2 |
| "Duty Free" with Bewhy and Ailee | 2018 | — | ** | The Call FINAL Project |
| "As I Told You" with Minzy | 2022 | — | ** | Watcha Original <Double Trouble> Episode.1 |
| "8282" with Hyolyn | 2022 | — | ** | Watcha Original <Double Trouble> Episode.2 |
| "Saturday Night" with Choa | 2022 | — | ** | Watcha Original <Double Trouble> Episode.3 |
| "Greetings" with Jiwoo of KARD | 2022 | — | ** | Watcha Original <Double Trouble> Episode.4 |
| "Me Gustas Tu" with Minzy | 2022 | — | ** | Watcha Original <Double Trouble> Episode.5 |
"—" denotes releases that did not chart. **Gaon stopped releasing download sales numbers in January 2018.

== Filmography ==
=== Variety show ===
| Year | Title | Notes |
|---|---|---|
| 2015 | King of Mask Singer | Contestant |
| 2018 | The Call | Soloist |
| 2021 | King of Mask Singer | Contestant |
| 2021 | Hidden: The Performance | Muse (with Hanhae) |

=== Web shows ===
| Year | Title | Network | Role | Ref. |
|---|---|---|---|---|
| 2021 | Double Trouble | Watcha | Contestant | |

== Awards and nominations ==
| Year | Award | Category | Nominated Work | Result |
|---|---|---|---|---|
| 2017 | Melon Music Awards | Hot Trend Award | "I Like You, I Don't" (좋아한다 안 한다) | Nominated |
| 2022 | Blue Dragon Series Award | Best New Male Entertainer (Variety) | Double Trouble | Pending |
