= Bastarz =

South Korean musical group

- Origin: Seoul, South Korea
- Genres: K-pop; Hip hop; R&B
- Years active: 2015–present
- Labels: KQ Entertainment; CJ E&M
- Spinoff of: Block B
- Members: B-Bomb; U-Kwon; P.O
- Website: http://www.sevenseasons.co.kr/

Bastarz (Korean: 바스타즈; RR: Baseutajeu; stylized BASTARZ) is the first official sub-unit of the South Korean boy band Block B. Established in April 2015, the sub-unit consists of three members: Block B's two main dancers, B-Bomb and U-Kwon, and the rapper P.O. The sub-unit debuted with their first mini album, entitled Conduct Zero, on April 14, 2015, released their second mini album, Welcome 2 Bastarz, on October 31, 2016, and released their third, I'm a Mess, on March 28, 2019.

== Origin ==
Although the members of Bastarz initially said they were chosen out of Block B's seven members through a random draw of colored balls, they later said that this was a joke, and that Seven Seasons' CEO chose them for the sub-unit.

== History ==
On April 5 and 6, 2015, Block B announced through solo teaser photos that P.O, U-Kwon, and B-Bomb would make up Bastarz. Though not a part of the sub-unit, Zico confirmed that he produced Bastarz' first title track.

The sub-unit's album was released April 13, 2015, along with a video for the title track, "Zero for Conduct." The album debuted at #3 on the Gaon album chart, with the singles "Conduct Zero," "Charlie Chaplin," "Thief," "Nobody but You," and "Sue Me" debuting on the Gaon digital chart at #6, #24, #63, #65, and #76, respectively.

Bastarz' "Conduct Zero" was nominated for five awards in 2015, including two MAMAs, two Seoul Music Awards, and a Melon Music Award for best dance performance.

In October 2015, Bastarz made their Japanese debut with the release of the CD single Hinko Zero, which reached #20 on the Oricon chart.

The following year saw Bastarz' second Korean release. The sub-unit's lead single "Selfish & Beautiful Girl," composed by P.O, was released on October 24, 2016. A follow-up single, titled "Make It Rain," composed by Dean, was released on October 31 along with the full Welcome 2 Bastarz extended play, which debuted at #6 on the Gaon album chart. The following week, the sub-unit made a surprise video release for the song "That's Right," featuring the members filming each other as they travel.

P.O received lyrics credits for all five songs on Welcome 2 Bastarz and composition credits for "Selfish & Beautiful Girl," "That's Right," and "The Hidden Girl," while B-Bomb received both lyrics and composition credits for the song "Tightly."

On April 29, 2017, Bastarz performed at the Korea Times Music Festival, held at the Hollywood Bowl.

On May 20, 2018, Bastarz competed on the JTBC music show Two Yoo Project Sugar Man. Bastarz won the show with a remake of "An Alley," a song by Yang Dong-geun that itself was a remake of a song by Lee Jae-min.

Two Bastarz concerts were announced February 23, 2019, to take place March 29 and March 30 in Seoul.

Bastarz released their third mini-album, I'm a Mess, on March 28, 2019. The album contains eight songs, including three solo songs, and the group members were heavily involved in the production of the album: P.O received lyrics credit for five songs on the album and composition credit for three, B-Bomb received lyrics credit for two songs and composition credits for three, and U-Kwon received lyrics and composition credit for one song.

== Discography ==
=== Extended plays ===
Title	Album details	Peak chart positions		Sales
Title	Album details	KOR	US World	Sales
Korean
Conduct Zero	Released: April 14, 2015; Label: Seven Seasons, CJ E&M Music and Live; Format: CD, digital download; Track listing: 1. "Zero for Conduct"; 2. "Charlie Chaplin"; 3. "Thief"; 4. "Nobody but You"; 5. "Sue Me" (feat. Incredible)	3	11	KOR: 33,766
Welcome 2 Bastarz	Released: October 31, 2016; Label: Seven Seasons, CJ E&M Music and Live; Format: CD, digital download; Track listing: 1. "Selfish & Beautiful Girl"; 2. "Make It Rain"; 3. "That's Right"; 4. "Tightly"; 5. "The Hidden Girl"	6	—	KOR: 20,946
I'm a Mess	Released: March 28, 2019; Label: KQ Entertainment, CJ E&M Music; Format: CD, digital download; Track listing: 1. "Messed Up"; 2. "Help Me"; 3. "From Seoul"; 4. "If Not Me Who"; 5. "Easy"; 6. "Recognize" (feat.punchnello) [B-BOMB solo]; 7. "Let's Ride" (feat.Ja Mezz) [U-KWON solo]; 8. "Comme des Garcons (소년처럼)" [P.O solo]	10	—	KOR: 9,581

=== Single albums ===
Title	Album details	Peak chart positions		Sales
Title	Album details	JPN Oricon	JPN Billboard	Sales
Japanese
Hinko Zero	Released: October 7, 2015; Label: Seven Seasons, King Records; Format: CD, digital download	20	84	JPN: 4,126
"—" denotes releases that did not chart or were not released in that region.

=== Promotional singles ===
Title	Year	Peak chart positions		Sales	Album
Title	Year	KOR	US World	Sales	Album
"Conduct Zero" (품행제로)	2015	6	5	KOR (DL): 637,697	Conduct Zero
"Selfish & Beautiful Girl" (이기적인 걸)	2016	16	—	KOR (DL): 77,137	Welcome 2 Bastarz
"Make It Rain"	2016	52	15	KOR (DL): 43,326	Welcome 2 Bastarz
"From Seoul"	2019	—	—		I'm a Mess
"Help Me"	2019	—	—		I'm a Mess

=== Other charted songs ===
Title	Year	Peak chart positions	Sales	Album
Title	Year	KOR	Sales	Album
"Charlie Chaplin" (찰리채플린)	2015	24	KOR (DL): 85,523	Conduct Zero
"Thief" (도둑)	2015	63	KOR (DL): 29,517	Conduct Zero
"Nobody but You"	2015	65	KOR (DL): 29,069	Conduct Zero
"Sue Me" (배째)	2015	76	KOR (DL): 26,800	Conduct Zero
"Tightly" (타이트하게)	2016	—	KOR (DL): 20,226	Welcome 2 Bastarz
"That's Right"	2016	—	KOR (DL): 17,301	Welcome 2 Bastarz
"The Hidden Girl" (숨은 그림 찾기)	2016	—	KOR (DL): 16,733	Welcome 2 Bastarz

== Videography ==
=== Music videos ===
Year	Title	Director(s)
2015	"Conduct Zero"	Purple Straw Films
2015	"Hinko Zero"	Purple Straw Films
2016	"Selfish & Beautiful Girl"	Ziyong Kim (FantazyLab)
2016	"Make It Rain"	Ziyong Kim (FantazyLab)
2016	"That's Right"	Block B Bastarz
2019	"From Seoul"	DearLiar
2019	"Help Me"	Lee Sang Duk, Park Jae Young (Mustache Film)

== Awards ==
Year	Award	Category	Recipient	Result
2015	MelOn Music Awards	Dance	"Zero for Conduct"	Nominated
2015	Mnet Asian Music Awards	Best Collaboration and Unit	"Zero for Conduct"	Nominated
2015	Mnet Asian Music Awards	Song of the Year	"Zero for Conduct"	Nominated
2015	25th Seoul Music Awards	Bonsang Award	"Zero for Conduct"	Nominated
2015	25th Seoul Music Awards	Popularity Award	"Zero for Conduct"	Nominated
