= Blooming Period =

EP by Block B
- Released: April 11, 2016
- Recorded: 2016
- Studio: In Grid (Seoul)
- Genre: Hip hop; R&B; K-pop
- Length: 22:24
- Language: Korean
- Label: Seven Seasons; CJ E&M
- Producer: Zico; Poptime

Block B chronology
H.E.R (2014)	Blooming Period (2016)	Yesterday (2017)

Singles from Blooming Period
- 1. "몇 년 후에 (A Few Years Later)" Released: March 28, 2016; 2. "Toy" Released: April 11, 2016

Blooming Period is the fifth extended play by South Korean boy band Block B, released on April 11, 2016, by Seven Seasons, almost two years since their last Korean album, H.E.R. The album contains two singles, "몇 년 후에 (A Few Years Later)", which was pre-released on March 28, 2016; and "Toy", which was released with the EP.

== Background and release ==
The group announced the release of their fifth mini album in the first week of March in 2016 with plans of releasing its lead single ahead of the album. "몇 년 후에 (A Few Years Later)" was released digitally on March 28 and is described as 'neo soul genre music'. It was also noted to be different from the group's previous releases, bringing out their more emotional side musically, also showing it through their acting in the song's music video which was released on the same day.

Produced by member Zico and Poptime, Blooming Period was eventually released on April 11, 2016 with another single, "Toy", which also had its music video released on the same day.

== Composition ==
Zico and Poptime composed the first three tracks, while "Walkin' In The Rain" was composed by Park Kyung & Score Megatone, and "빙글빙글 (Bingle Bingle)" was written and composed by Dean. All the tracks, including both singles, were penned by Zico with the exception of "빙글빙글 (Bingle Bingle)". "몇 년 후에 (A Few Years Later)" and "Walkin' In The Rain"'s lyrics' were written with Park Kyung.

== Promotion ==
Block B started promotions on music programs on Music Bank on April 15, where they performed "A Few Years Later" and "Toy". The group also appeared on You Hee-yeol's Sketchbook on the same day and performed the two singles from the album, along with their other songs.

== Commercial performance ==
"몇 년 후에 (A Few Years Later)" debuted at No. 3 on the Gaon Singles Chart. The group won its first music show trophy for "몇 년 후에 (A Few Years Later)" on Inkigayo on April 10. "Toy" debuted at No. 2 on the Gaon Singles Chart and the album itself debuted at #1. The album also charted at No. 4 on Billboard's World Albums chart. The group received their first music show trophy for "Toy" on April 20 on Show Champion.

== Track listing ==
Credits are adapted from Naver.

No.	Title	Lyrics	Music	Length
1.	"몇 년 후에 (A Few Years Later)"	Zico; Park Kyung	Zico; Poptime	3:47
2.	"Toy"	Zico	Zico; Poptime	3:26
3.	"사랑이었다 (It Was Love)" (Taeil)	Zico	Zico; Poptime	4:29
4.	"Walkin' In The Rain"	Zico; Park Kyung	Park Kyung; Score Megatone	3:36
5.	"빙글빙글 (Bingle Bingle)" (B-Bomb, U-Kwon)	Deanfluenza	Deanfluenza; Beat & Keys	3:17
6.	"몇 년 후에 (A Few Years Later)" (Instrumental)		Zico; Poptime	3:47
Total length:				22:24

== Charts ==
Chart (2014)	Peak position
Japanese Oricon Albums Chart	52
South Korean Gaon Albums Chart	1
US Billboard World Albums	4
