= P.O =

- P.O in 2024
- Born: Pyo Ji-hoon; February 2, 1993 (age 33); Mapo District, Seoul, South Korea
- Occupations: Rapper; singer; actor
- Agent: Artist Company
- Musical career
- Genres: K-pop; hip hop
- Instrument: Vocals
- Years active: 2011–present

Korean name
- Hangul: 표지훈
- RR: Pyo Jihun
- MR: P'yo Chihun

Pyo Ji-hoon (Korean: 표지훈; born February 2, 1993), known professionally as P.O (피오), is a South Korean rapper, singer and actor. He is the youngest member of the boy group Block B and its sub-unit Bastarz. As an actor, he has appeared in television series Encounter (2018–19), Hotel Del Luna (2019), Good Partner (2024), and Teach You a Lesson (2026).

== Early life and education ==
P.O was born Pyo Ji-hoon on February 2, 1993, in Seongsan-dong, Mapo District, Seoul, South Korea. He attended Hanlim Multi Art School, graduating in 2012.

== Career ==
=== Pre-debut ===
P.O got acting lessons in elementary school and entered Hanlim Multi Art School to chase after his original dream of becoming an actor. He then fell in love with Hip hop together with his bestfriend Mino. He decided to rejoin Stardom Entertainment, after they kicked him out previously before he lost weight and ignored offers from other agencies, to debut with Block B.

=== 2011–2012: Debut and hospitalization ===
P.O debuted with Block B in April 2011. In February 2012, the band received heavy criticism for their disrespectful behavior during an interview in Thailand, particularly jokes regarding about the previous year's flooding disaster. P.O reportedly fainted and was hospitalized for shock on February 24, after learning of a petition calling for the members to apologize by committing suicide.

To show his gratitude to BBC (Block B Club), Block B's official fanbase, P.O released a song written especially for them. "Dear My Wife" was released into his cyworld on September 25, featuring (previously part of BoM's) Winner's Mino.

Along with fellow Block B member, Zico, they both were chosen as MCs for SBS MTV's The Show. During a November 2012 episode of Weekly Idol, P.O stated that he came from a wealthy family background, explaining that his father runs a duty-free store.

=== 2013–2014: Bigboi is Ready 2 Showtime and collaborations ===
On March 9, P.O released the first song "Amino Acid" from his Mixtape Bigboi is Ready 2 Showtime, featuring Winner's Mino. He continued releasing songs each day until March 21. Rookie girl group Delight featured P.O in their song "Mega-Yak". In September 2013, P.O starred in Kye Bum-zu's "Something Special" music video alongside Hello Venus's Yoon-jo.

In 2014, P.O was featured in the digital single "It's not a Big Deal" by V.O.S's Kim Kyung Rok, released January 6. P.O also co-wrote the lyrics for the title track of the SBS drama Secret Door, which was performed by Block B and released September 22.

=== 2015: Bastarz ===
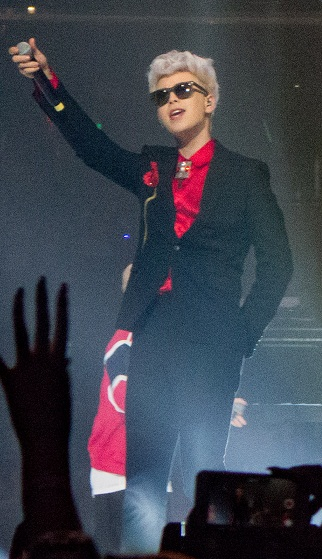
P.O performing with Block B in 2015

On April 5, it was announced that P.O would participate in Block B's first sub-unit, Bastarz, along with members U-Kwon and B-Bomb. The sub-unit's album was released April 13, along with a video for the title track, "Zero for Conduct," and it debuted at No. 3 on the Gaon album chart.

P.O was significantly involved with the creation of the Bastarz album, receiving a lyrics credit for "Zero for Conduct," sole lyrics credit and a composition credit for "Charlie Chaplin," a lyrics credit for "Thief," and a lyrics and composition credit for "Sue Me," which he performed along with the rapper Incredivle.

On May 23, P.O appeared with fellow Block B member Taeil on the KBS show Immortal Songs 2, where they performed a remake of the song "I Don't Know Why" by Kim Soo-chul. P.O featured in Bumzu's "Give It 2 U," which was released in late July.

Bastarz released a Japanese version of "Conduct Zero" in October; the CD single containing the song reached No. 20 on the Oricon weekly chart.

=== 2016: Theatrical debut and Bastarz comeback ===
In February, P.O appeared in the theatrical play Superman.com, which he also helped write and produce as part of a new theatrical troupe, Company Boy (극단 소년).

In October, Block B announced that the Bastarz sub-unit would be having a comeback featuring a lead single composed by P.O, which was released October 24. The sub-unit's second mini-album, Welcome to BASTARZ, was released October 31; P.O received lyrics credits for all five songs on the album, and composition credits for three.

Also in October, the OnStyle network announced that P.O and fellow Block B member U-Kwon would be on the new show Lipstick Prince. The first season aired from December 1, 2016, to February 16, 2017.

=== 2017: Variety and Drama Shows, Solo Debut ===
P.O was cast in Living Together in Empty Room, a special variety show broadcast on MBC for the Korean New Year in three episodes from January 26 to 27, 2017. In the course of the show, two women, trot singer Hong Jin-young and comedian Kim Shin-young, moved into P.O's house. The show ranked No. 1 among New Year's specials. In March it was reported that the show would be picked up and aired as a series, and that P.O would be among the cast members.

In addition, P.O was cast as an MC for the cooking variety show Strange Restaurant, which premiered on the O'live television channel March 13. P.O hosted the show, in which guests attempted to cook dishes they have ordered, along with Kim Jong-min, Kim Yong-man, and Seo Jang-hoon.

P.O also appeared in the second season of Lipstick Prince, which premiered March 30.

On April 5, it was announced that P.O had been cast in the upcoming drama "Our First Romance," starring Lee Jong-hyun and Lee Yu-bi, and written by Go Sun Hee, who also wrote the tvN drama Cheese in the Trap. Later that month, it was reported that P.O had been cast on a pilot MBC variety show called Secret Variety Institute.

In May, it was announced that P.O would be an MC for the SBS MTV music program The Show, along with Jeonghwa of EXID and Yeonwoo of Momoland. P.O appeared in a second play by the Company Boy troupe, Manitoz, which ran from June 17 to 25. Also in June, he and fellow group member U-Kwon received the Maxim K-Model Icon Idol Award. In July, it was reported that P.O had been cast in the SBS drama Temperature of Love, which began airing in September. The show's debut episode had the highest ratings in its time slot.

P.O took part in the Japanese special project album, Block B: Project-1, released September 20, performing the song "Winner" along with fellow Block B member U-Kwon and Japanese rapper Chanmina.

On September 19, it was announced that P.O would make his solo debut. His song, the funk tune "Men'z Night," was released September 27 and featured the singer Chancellor.

In December, P.O took part in a tribute album for the late singer Yoo Jae-ha to commemorate the 30th anniversary of his debut.

=== 2018–present: Variety success and solo projects ===
In spring of 2018, P.O appeared again as a cast member on Living Together in Empty Room, living with stylist Han Hye-yeon and Jinyoung of Got7. In addition, the Company Boy troupe staged another production of Superman.com in which P.O starred. Later in the year, he became a regular cast member for Great Escape and New Journey to the West 5/6.

In addition to his work on variety shows, in 2018 P.O acted in two dramas, Encounter (broadcast by tvN) and Love Alert (broadcast by MBN).

P.O released a new song, "Comme des Garçons," on November 11, 2018. The song features a funky sound and personal lyrics that discuss P.O's life from before his debut to the present.

During the broadcast of the last episode of New Journey to the West 6 on December 2, 2018, it was announced that P.O would be joining the upcoming second season of Kang's Kitchen.

In February 2019, it was announced that P.O would star in a new theatrical production by the Company Boy troupe, a live version of the 2005 film Boy Goes to Heaven scheduled to run from February 16 to March 3.

In November 2019, it was revealed that P.O would act as master of ceremony for the upcoming MBC Entertainment Awards, along with Hwasa of Mamamoo and Jun Hyun-moo.

In December 2020, P.O starred in another Company Boy theatrical production, the play Almost, Maine. P.O played the characters of Randy and Dave in the production, which ran from December 25, 2020, to February 14, 2021. P.O also starred in the play's Busan production, which took place in June 2021.

In September 2021, P.O's label, Seven Seasons, announced that he would not be renewing his contract with them at the end of the month.

On October 29, 2021, P.O officially signed with Artist Company.

On February 10, 2022, it was reported that P.O would be recording his last show Amazing Saturday in March, three days before his military service.

== Personal life ==
=== Mental health ===
On February 24, 2012, P.O (real name Pyo Ji-hoon) was diagnosed with "stress-induced schizophrenia" shortly after being hospitalized for fainting. Though his uncle Pyo Jin-in would later dispute the accuracy of the diagnosis on his Twitter account. Jin-in criticized it for its vagueness, and the fact that it was given quickly. He cited that symptoms might have arisen due to SPD, schizoaffective disorder, brief psychotic disorder or PTSD and they would have been shown for at least six months if it were to match those of schizophrenia.

=== Military service ===
P.O enlisted in the Republic of Korea Marine Corps on March 28, 2022. Later in June 2022, the agency said that P.O. had just been assigned to the Marine Corps headquarters in Hwaseong, Gyeonggi-do and was planning to serve in a military band. Previously, he has postponed his military service until December 2021 to focus on broadcasting and acting. He was officially discharged on September 27, 2023.

== Discography ==
=== Singles ===
Title	Year	Peak chart positions	Album
Title	Year	KOR	Album
"Men'z Night"	2017	—	Non-album singles
"Comme des Garçons" (소년처럼)	2018	—	Non-album singles
"Promise" (featuring Mino)	2019	148	Non-album singles
"—" denotes releases that did not chart.

== Filmography ==
Key
†	Denotes films that have not yet been released

=== Film ===
Year	Title	Role	Notes	Ref.
2022	Let's Go to the Moon	Hyuk		
2023	New Normal	Gi-jin	Closing film at 26th BIFFF	
2026	Heartman: Rock and Love	Choi Seung-ho		

=== Television series ===
Year	Title	Role	Notes	Ref.
2017	Temperature of Love	Kang Min-ho		
2018	Encounter	Kim Jin-myung		
2018	Love Alert	Yoon Yoo-Joon		
2019	Hotel del Luna	Ji Hyun-joong		
2020	More Than Friends	Jin Sang-hyuk		
2021	Mouse	Shin Sang		
2022	Yumi's Cells		Cameo (Season 2)	
2024	Good Partner	Jeon Eun-ho		
2026	Teach You a Lesson	Bong Geun-dae		

=== Web series ===
Year	Title	Platform	Role	Notes	Ref.
2022	Goosebumps – Soreum	Kakao TV	Gi-jin	one-act drama	

=== Television shows ===
Year	Title	Role	Notes/Ref.
2014	Fashion King Korea	Contestant	with Zico
2016	Lipstick Prince	Cast member	with U-Kwon, Season 1
2017	Strange Restaurant	Host	
2017	Lipstick Prince	Cast member	with U-Kwon, Season 2
2017	Secret Variety Institute	Cast member	
2017–2018	Living Together in Empty Room	Cast member	
2018	Cover Brothers	Cast member	
2018	Great Escape	Cast member	Season 1 & 3–4
2018	Dead If Shot	Cast member	
2018	Those Who Cross the Line	Guest	Episodes 13–16
2018	New Journey to the West	Cast member	Season 5–6
2018	After School Hip-Hop	MC	with Kim Shin-young
2018–2022; 2023–present	DoReMi Market	Cast member	
2019	Great Escape	Cast member	Season 2
2019	Kang's Kitchen	Cast member	as a sous chef (Season 2–3)
2019	Matching Survival 1+1	Host	
2019	New Journey to the West	Cast member	Season 7–8
2019	Clothing Store	Cast member	
2020	Mapo Hipster	Cast member	with Song Min-ho
2020	Heart Signal	Panelist	
2021	Spring Camp	Cast member	
2021	Wild Idol	Daily mentor	

=== Radio show ===
Year	Title	Network	Notes
2020–2021	Brrrr Friends	Naver NOW	Host, with Song Min-ho

=== Hosting ===
Year	Title	Network	Notes
2012	The Show	SBS MTV	with Zico
2017	The Show	SBS MTV	
2019	MBC Entertainment Awards	MBC	with Jun Hyun-moo, Hwasa

== Theater ==
Year	English title	Korean title	Role
2016, 2018	Superman.com	슈퍼맨닷컴	Jo Eun-dal
2017	Manitoz	마니토즈	Park Young-beom
2019	Boy Goes to Heaven	소년, 천국에 가다	Police Chief
2020, 2021	Almost, Maine	올모스트, 메인	Randy / Dave
2022	Playback	플레이백	Man

== Awards and nominations ==
Year presented, name of the award ceremony, award category, nominated work and the result of the nomination
Year	Award	Category	Nominated Work	Result
2017	MBC Entertainment Awards	Best Couple with Sandara Park	Living Together in Empty Room	Nominated
2017	MBC Entertainment Awards	Popularity Award	Living Together in Empty Room	Won
2019	Brand of the Year Awards	Male Variety Star	P.O	Won
2020	Brand of the Year Awards	Male Variety Star	P.O	Nominated
2020	Asia Model Awards	Fashionista Award	P.O	Won
2020	APAN Music Awards	Entertainer of the Year - Male	P.O	Nominated
2021	Brand Customer Loyalty Awards	Best Male Variety Idol	P.O	Nominated
2021	Brand Customer Loyalty Awards	Best Male Acting Idol	P.O	Nominated
2024	SBS Drama Awards	Excellence Award, Actor in a Miniseries	P.O	Won
2024	SBS Drama Awards	Best Supporting Team	Good Partner	Won
