= Block B =

South Korean boy band

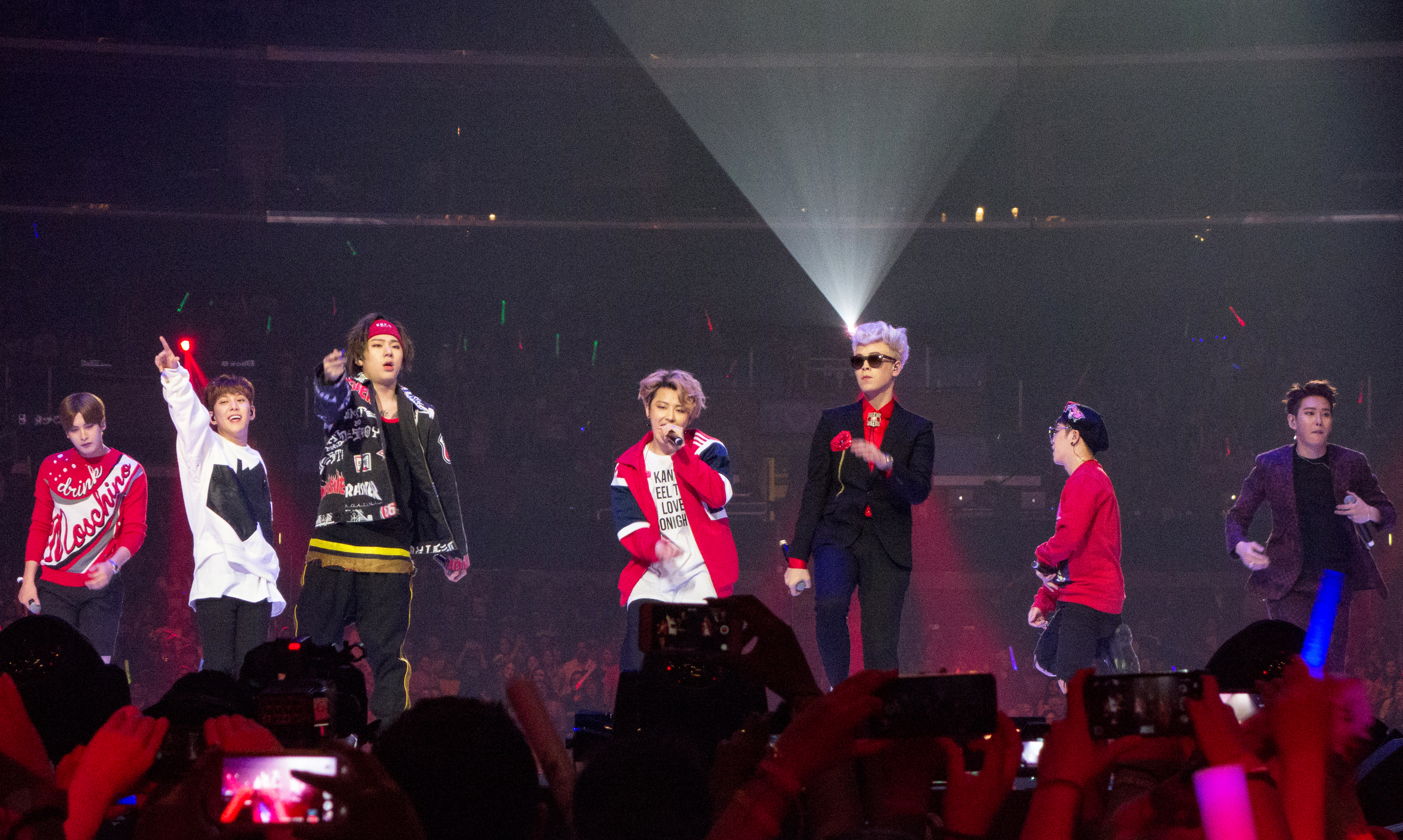
- Block B at the 2015 KCON; From left to right: Jaehyo, Park Kyung, Zico, U-Kwon, P.O, Taeil, B-Bomb

Background information
- Origin: Seoul, South Korea
- Genres: K-pop, hip hop
- Years active: 2011–present
- Labels: Seven Seasons; KQ Entertainment
- Spinoffs: Bastarz; T2U
- Members: Taeil; B-Bomb; Jaehyo; U-Kwon; Park Kyung; Zico; P.O
- Website: kqent.com; www.sevenseasons.co.kr

Block B (Korean: 블락비) is a South Korean boy band managed by KQ Entertainment, and consists of seven members: Taeil, B-Bomb, Jaehyo, U-Kwon, Park Kyung, Zico, and P.O. Block B has received several accolades, including nominations for seven Golden Disc Awards and eleven Seoul Music Awards.

Block B was created by musician Cho PD in 2011 on a budget of US$1.4 million. They made their live debut on KBS' Music Bank and MTV's Match Up!. In 2012, they released their debut studio album, Blockbuster, which finished in the top ten on the Billboard Korea and Gaon Album charts.

In 2013, Block B filed a lawsuit against Stardom Entertainment—their agency at the time—and took a small break from releasing music and performing live.

Block B achieved commercial success with the single albums Jackpot (2014), Very Good (2015) and H.E.R. (2015). In 2016, they released the Japanese-language studio album, My Zone, which ranked in the top ten on the Billboard Japan and Oricon charts.

== History ==
=== 2011–2013: Formation and beginnings ===
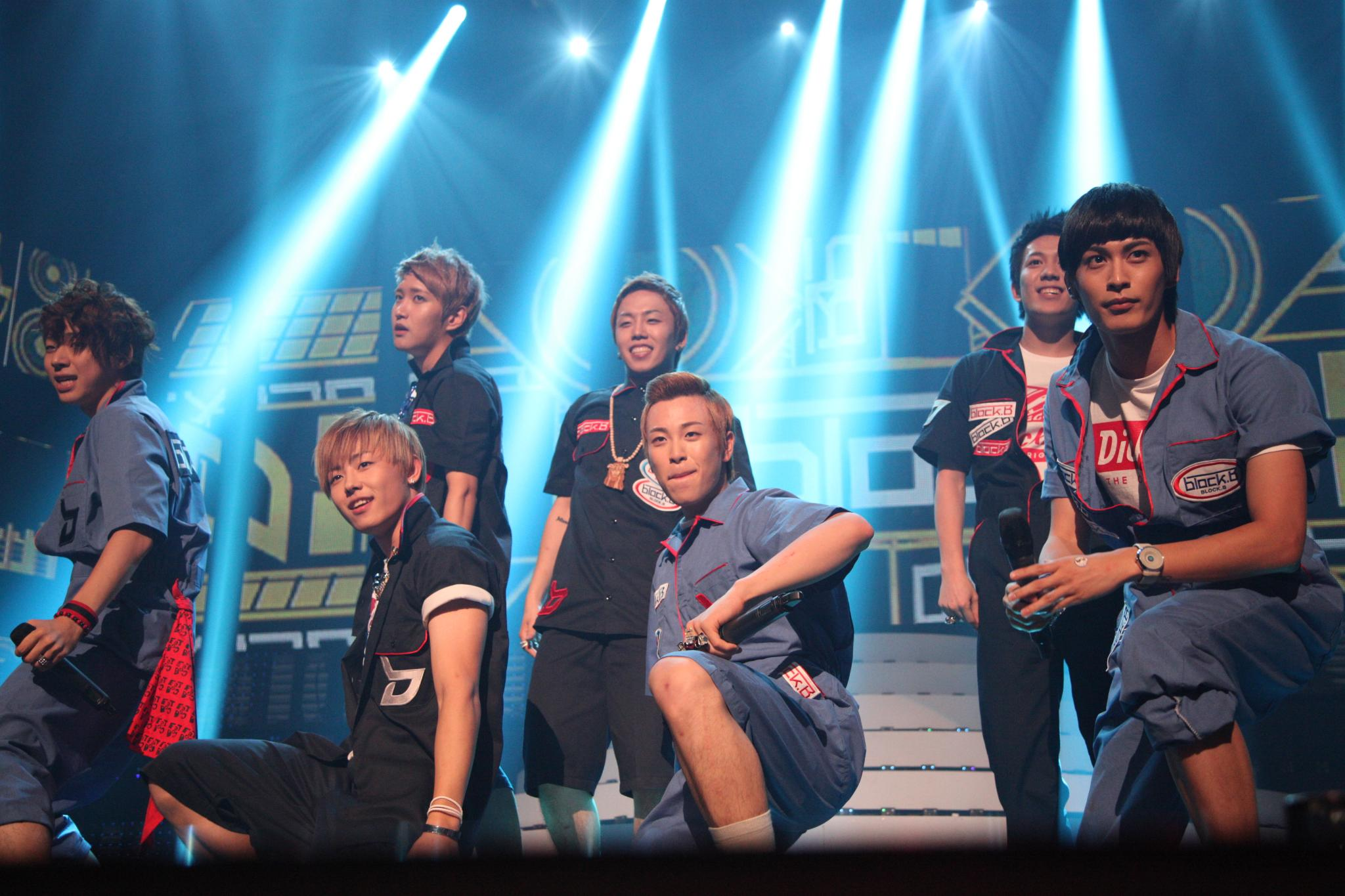
Block B at the Cyworld Dream Music Festival in 2011

In February 2011, Cho PD announced that he would spend US$1.4 million to create a seven-member hip-hop group under his "Creating Korea's Eminem Project". On April 13, 2011, their debut music video for "Freeze!" was released, but banned by the Commission of Youth Protection because they felt that it was too sexy for Korean television. As a result, the song could not be sold to minors under the age of 19, and the video could not be aired before 10 pm.

On April 15, 2011, Block B made their live debut on KBS Music Bank. The group followed up with another track, "Wanna B". A mini album, New Kids on the Block, was released on June 23, 2011. On June 22, 2011, the first episode of MTV's eight-episode series Match Up! was aired featuring Block B and B1A4. On October 16, 2011, MTV started airing a series of specials for the Match Up series that followed Block B as they promoted in Japan.

On January 3, 2013, it was reported that Block B had filed a suit against their agency to ask for their exclusive contract to be canceled. According to media reports, the Block B members filed against Stardom at the Seoul Central District Court and stated "During the signing of the exclusive contract, it was promised that in addition to providing proper training opportunity and facilities, we would be paid on every 25th of the following month... However, the agency has not paid us for nearly one year since April 2011." They stated: "The CEO of the agency, Mr. Lee, has also disappeared with the 70,000,000 KRW (~66,000 USD) that he collected from the members' parents." On May 20, 2013, it was reported that Lee had committed suicide.

On June 7, 2013, the court ruled in favor of the company, saying "It's difficult to see the company not being able to pay the group as intentional. From the evidence provided so far, it is difficult to claim that the label purposely did not pay Block B. It is also difficult to say that the label did not provide proper facilities such as studios and dorms, and it is also difficult to say that they did not provide education and guidance. From written records, it cannot be said that Stardom Entertainment violated their management obligations. There is a possibility that the musical income of 430,000,000 KRW (approximately $385,000 USD) and the event income of 5,000,000 KRW (approximately $4,500 USD) was not properly taken care of. However, from just the evidence provided, it cannot be said that the label purposely kept the money from the members."

=== 2013–2014: Blockbuster and mini albums ===
On August 29, 2013, Block B announced that they had negotiated the transfer of their rights from Stardom to a new management company, Seven Seasons. A representative from Seven Seasons said that the group was planning to release a new album in October. On September 17, 2013, Block B announced their pre-released single via Seven Seasons' YouTube channel. The single "Be the Light" featured Taeil's singing voice with a short clip of their music video accompanying it. The full video was released September 22, 2013. The song reached #14 on the Gaon digital chart in the first week of its release.

Block B released their first full-length album, Blockbuster, in 2013. The title track "Nillili Mambo" was well received and ranked number 10 on Billboard's World Albums Chart. Very Good reached number 1 on the Gaon album chart, while the singles "Very Good", "When Where What How", and "Nice Day" respectively debuted at 6, 20, and 26 on the Gaon digital single chart. The album also reached no. 6 on the Billboard world album chart.

Block B starred their own reality show titled Five Minutes Before Chaos (개판5분전), which premiered April 10 on Mnet. In early April, Block B announced that they would release a new album entitled Jackpot. The video for the album's title track, "Jackpot", was released on April 15, while the album itself was scheduled to be released on April 17. In May, Block B held their first Korean concert series 2014 Blockbuster, selling out Olympic Park's Olympic Hall on the first day of pre-sales. The series was held on May 17 and 18 in Seoul, as well as May 23 and 24 in Busan. Block B presented showcases in New York, Miami, and Washington D.C. in June through the concert organizer Jazzy Group.

On July 24, Seven Seasons announced that Block B released a mini album titled H.E.R. The mini album's to titular track reached number 3 on the Gaon digital singles chart, while the singles "Jackpot", "Extraordinary Woman", "Hold Me Now", and "Very Good (Rough Ver.)" respectively peaked at number 5, 16, 28, and 80. The album debuted at number six on the Billboard World Albums chart and number two on the Gaon album chart. From November 22 to 23, Block B performed an encore solo Korean concert series, 2014 Blockbuster Remastering, which attracted more than 10,000 fans to two shows at Seoul's SK Olympic Handball Gymnasium.

=== 2015–2017: My Zone and expansion ===
Block B made its official Japanese debut on January 21, 2015, with the release of the single "Very Good (Japanese Version)". The single peaked number 5 on the Oricon weekly chart and number seven on the Billboard Japan Hot 100. The CD release followed a pair of concerts in Tokyo on January 16 and 17 that attracted more than 5,000 fans. The group had its first official fan meeting on February 15, 2015, attracting approximately 8,000 fans to Seoul's SK Olympic Handball Gymnasium. Block B conducted their first European tour in February and March 2015, visiting Paris on February 27, Helsinki on March 1, Warsaw on March 6, and Milan on March 8. The tour sold out most shows.

And album by sub-unit Bastarz was released April 13, and peaked at number 3 on the Gaon album chart. Although originally four concerts being scheduled, due to strong demand for tickets, the tour was expanded to seven concerts on May 14, with performances in Tokyo, Osaka, Fukuoka, and Nagoya having some 20,000 fans. The single "H.E.R" debuted at number seven on the weekly Oricon chart.

On August 2, Block B performed at the Los Angeles KCON. The Los Angeles Times reported that "Block B had one of the most successful melds of Korean hip-hop with boy-band dynamics to come of the scene." On September 23, it was announced that Block B would tour the United States for a second time in a concert series organized by SubKulture Entertainment. The group performed in San Francisco November 11, the Chicago area November 13, and Los Angeles November 15.

Block B released the single "A Few Years Later" two days after their Saturday Night Live Korea appearance, which reached number 3 on the Gaon digital chart. Blooming Period debuted at number one on the Gaon album chart, with the singles "Toy", "Walkin' in the Rain", "It Was Love" (Taeil version), and "Bingle Bingle" debuting on the Gaon digital chart at numbers two, 16, 17, and 52, respectively.

On June 16, 2016, Block B's Agency Seven Seasons announced their name change to "KQ Entertainment" in hopes to branch out more and improve their management and development of various artists. It was revealed later by KQ Entertainment's CEO, Kim Kyu Wook that the company is a new type of entities in the business field, where different companies are operated by the same management team and the same employees and Seven Seasons will remain the label that manages Block B, but later on, KQ Entertainment became the company that manages Block B directly, Seven Seasons name and logo were no longer seen on many Block B members albums or merchandise.

Block B released two singles in Japan in 2016, "Jackpot" and "Toy". In late September, it was announced that the group would release My Zone, their first Japanese album, on October 26, 2016. On December 15, 2016, the concert organizer My Music Taste announced that Block B would have a European tour between February and March 2017. The cities on the tour include Amsterdam, Helsinki, Lisbon, Budapest, and London.

Block B Project-1 was released in Japan on September 20, 2017. The album featured five of the group members performing songs with a variety of Japanese artists, including "Winner", performed by P.O and U-Kwon with Chanmina; "Lost & Found", performed by Taeil with Keita Tachibana of W-inds; "Paradise", performed by B-Bomb with Ken the 390; and "Bus Stop", performed by Jaehyo with Naoko Tanaka. The members (with the exception of P.O) also performed a showcase in Tokyo the day before the release.

On October 17, 2017, Seven Seasons announced that Block B would release their sixth mini-album on November 7. On November 8, 2017, it was reported that Block B will have two concerts between January 27 and 28, 2018 in Jamsil Arena, Seoul. Later in the month, Sony Music Entertainment had struck a partnership with KQ Entertainment to promote the company's artists globally. At the end of 2017, Seven Seasons announced that Block B would return on January 8, 2018, with a repackage of their previous album, Montage, titled Re:MONTAGE. The title track, "Don't Leave", is a ballad song produced by Park Kyung.

=== 2018–2023: Military enlistments ===
On November 23, 2018, Seven Seasons announced that all members except Zico had renewed their contracts with Seven Seasons to pursue individual and sub-unit projects. The label said that future full-group activities would be negotiated with all seven members. On December 20, 2018, Jaehyo became the first group member to enter into the conscription required of South Korean men. Due to an injured knee, he was discharged from service in September 2019.

On June 10, 2019, Taeil began his compulsory military duty. After fulfilling his term of service, Taeil returned home on leave December 4, 2020, with his official discharge the following month. On October 10, 2019, B-Bomb began his military duty. On December 7 and 8, Park Kyung held his first solo concert with Block B as the second day guests, all members except B-Bomb and Taeil (who joined the concert through a phone call) were present as Block B. On May 18, 2020, U-Kwon began his compulsory military duty, and on July 21, 2020, it was announced that Zico would begin his military service July 30 as a public-service worker.

On January 4, 2021, Taeil was formally discharged from the military. B-Bomb was officially discharged from military service April 27, 2021, while U-Kwon was discharged November 21, 2021. In September 2021, P.O's label, Seven Seasons, announced that he would not be renewing his contract with them, and on October 29, 2021, P.O signed with the agency Artist Company. P.O enlisted in the Republic of Korea Marine Corps on March 28, 2022. On April 29, 2022, Zico was discharged from public service. On September 27, 2023 P.O was discharged from the military.

=== 2024–present: Block B's first performance as a full group ===
According to a News 1 report on August 22, 2024, the entire group will be appearing on the KBS 2TV show 'The Seasons - Zico's Artist' final episode recording in early September.

== Members ==
- Taeil (태일)
- B-Bomb (비범)
- Jaehyo (재효)
- U-Kwon (유권)
- Park Kyung (박경)
- Zico (지코)
- P.O (피오)

== Sub-units ==
- Bastarz (U-Kwon, B-Bomb, and P.O)
- T2U (U-Kwon and Taeil)

== Discography ==
=== Studio albums ===
- Blockbuster (2012)
- My Zone (2016)

== Filmography ==
=== Reality shows ===
- MTV Match Up (SBS MTV)
- MTV Match Up: Block B Returns (SBS MTV)
- Five Minutes Before Chaos (Mnet)

== Awards and nominations ==
Year presented, name of the award ceremony, award category and the result of the nomination
Year	Award/Critics	Category	Result
2012	20th Korean Culture Entertainment Awards	New Artist Award	Won
2012	27th Golden Disk Awards	New Rising Star Award	Nominated
2012	27th Golden Disk Awards	Popularity Award	Nominated
2012	SBS MTV Best of The Best Awards	Best Male Video ("Nillili Mambo")	Won
2012	22nd Seoul Music Awards	Bonsang Award	Nominated
2013	SBS MTV Best of The Best Awards	Best Male Group	Won
2013	K-Star Best KPop Awards	Best Fandom	Won
2013	Nate Year End Awards	Best Boy Group	Nominated
2013	28th Golden Disk Awards	Disk Album Award (Very Good)	Nominated
2013	28th Golden Disk Awards	Popularity Award	Nominated
2013	23rd Seoul Music Awards	Bonsang Award	Nominated
2013	23rd Seoul Music Awards	Popularity Award	Nominated
2014	Gaon Weibo Chart	Gaon Weibo Social Star Award	Won
2014	MelOn Music Awards	Best Male Dance Artist ("H.E.R")	Won
2014	16th Mnet Asian Music Awards	Best Male Group	Nominated
2014	16th Mnet Asian Music Awards	Best Music Video ("Jackpot")	Nominated
2014	16th Mnet Asian Music Awards	Artist of the Year	Nominated
2014	Nate Awards	People's Choice Singer	Nominated
2014	24th Seoul Music Awards	Bonsang Award	Nominated
2014	24th Seoul Music Awards	Popularity Award	Nominated
2014	24th Seoul Music Awards	Hallyu Special Award	Nominated
2014	29th Golden Disk Awards	Digital Album Award	Nominated
2014	29th Golden Disk Awards	Album Award	Nominated
2014	4th Gaon Chart Awards	Hot Trend Awards	Won
2016	Japan Gold Disc Award	Best New Asian Artist	Won
2016	1st Asia Artist Awards	Best Star Award, Singer	Won
2016	18th Mnet Asian Music Awards	Best Male Group	Nominated
2016	18th Mnet Asian Music Awards	HotelsCombined Artist of the Year	Nominated
2017	26th Seoul Music Awards	Bonsang Award	Nominated
2017	26th Seoul Music Awards	Mobile Popularity Award	Nominated
2017	Maxim K-Model Awards	Idol Icon Award	Won
2018	27th Seoul Music Awards	Bonsang Award	Nominated
2018	27th Seoul Music Awards	Popularity Award	Nominated
2018	27th Seoul Music Awards	Hallyu Special Award	Nominated
2018	32nd Golden Disk Awards	Digital Daesang/Song of the Year	Nominated
2018	Soribada Best K-Music Awards	Bonsang Award	Nominated
2018	Soribada Best K-Music Awards	Popularity Award (Male)	Nominated
