= List of Show! Music Core Chart winners (2020) =

Winners of South Korean music program Show! Music Core

Show! Music Core Chart winners (2020)

The Show! Music Core Chart is a record chart on the South Korean MBC television music program Show! Music Core. Every week, the show awards the best-performing single on the chart in the country during its live broadcast.

In 2020, 18 singles have ranked at number one on the chart and 15 music acts received first-place trophies. No release for the year achieved a perfect score, but "Life Goes On" by BTS acquired the highest point total on the December 5 broadcast with 11,881 points. The English language single "Dynamite" by BTS achieved number 1 for 10 consecutive weeks becoming the longest consecutive number 1 song, and the artist with the most wins was BTS at 18 wins.

== Scoring system ==
Period covered	Chart system				
Period covered	Broadcast	Digital sales	Physical album	Video views	Voting
August 24, 2019 – March 14, 2020	5% (MBC radio)	60% (50% gaon + 10% Vibe*)	10%	10%	25% (10% committee + 15% live-vote)
March 21, 2020 – July 18, 2020	5% (MBC radio)	60% (50% gaon + 10% Vibe*)	10%	10%	35% (10% committee + 10% pre-vote* + 15% live-vote)
July 25, 2020 – September 19, 2020	5% (MBC radio)	50%	10%	10%	35% (10% committee + 10% pre-vote* + 15% live-vote)
September 26, 2020 – February 20, 2021	5% (MBC radio)	60% (50% gaon + 10% FLO*)	10%	10%	35% (10% committee + 10% pre-vote* + 15% live-vote)

== Chart history ==
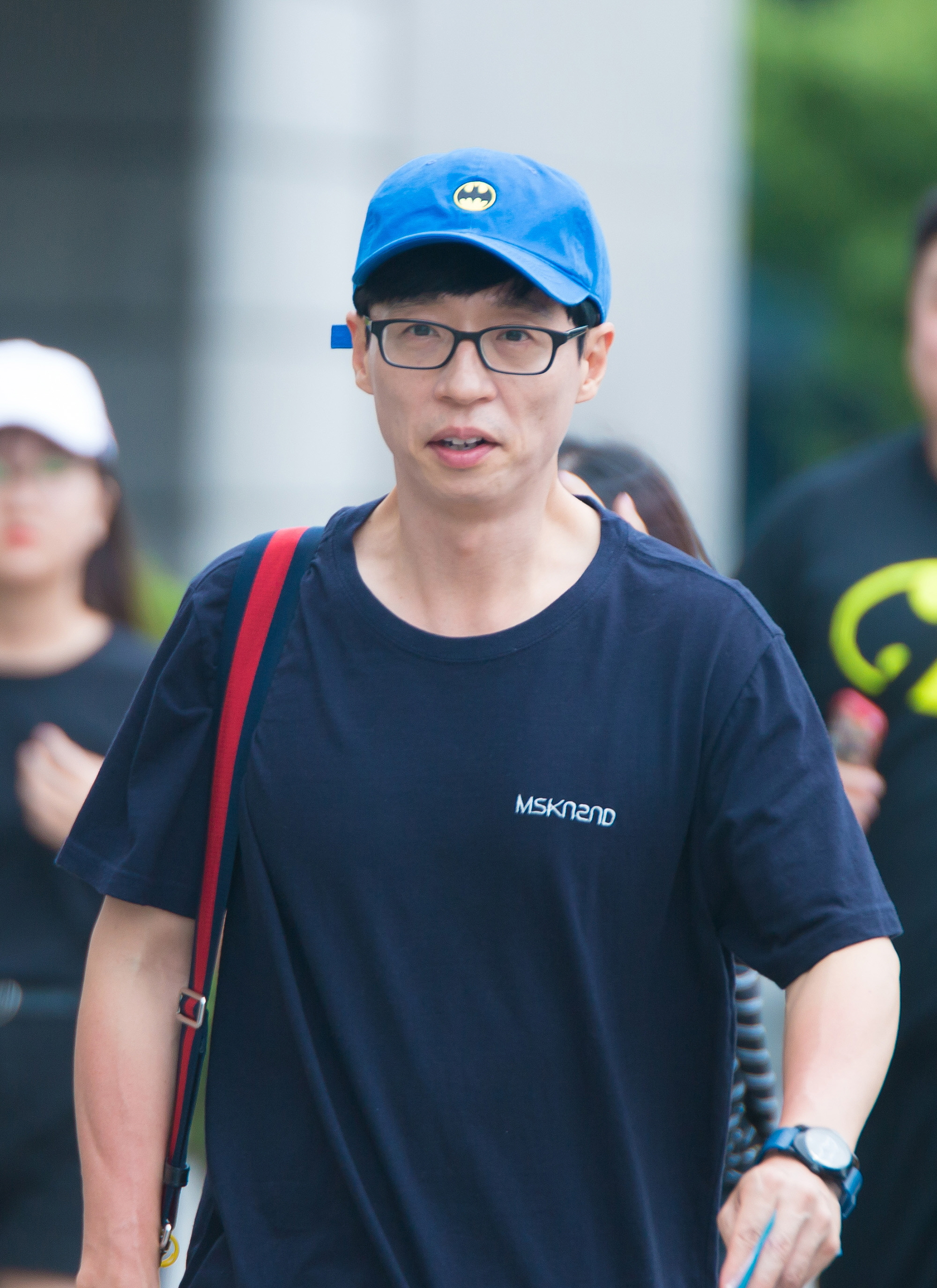
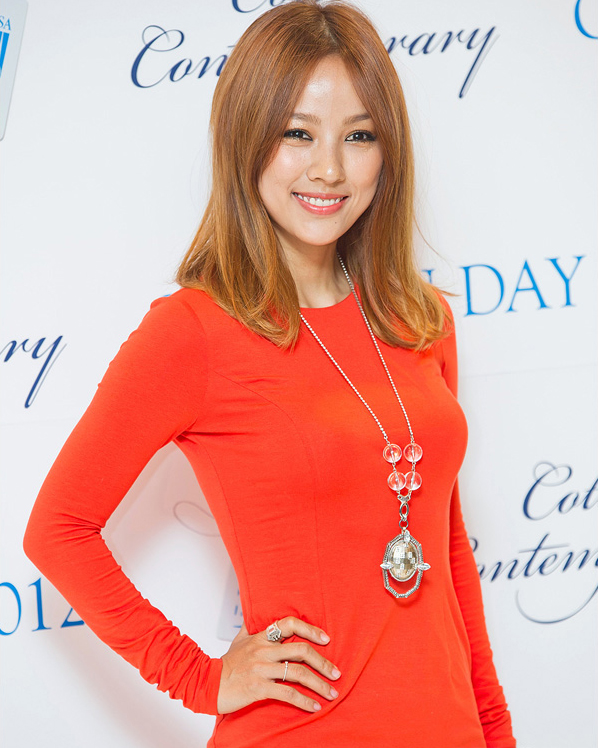
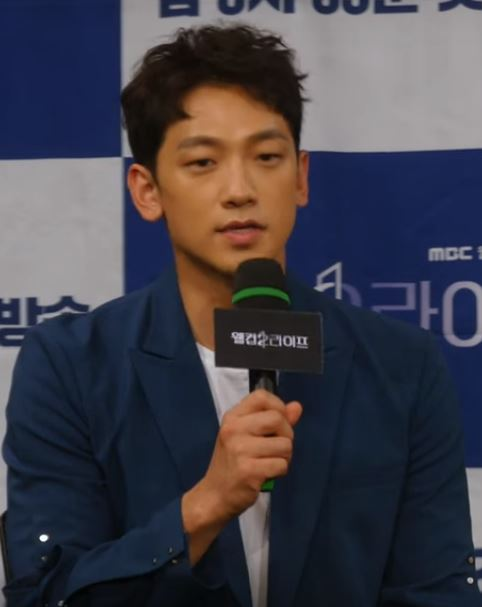
SSAK3 (L to R: Yoo Jae-suk, Lee Hyori, Rain) received their first broadcast music show win with their trophy for "Beach Again" on Show! Music Core.
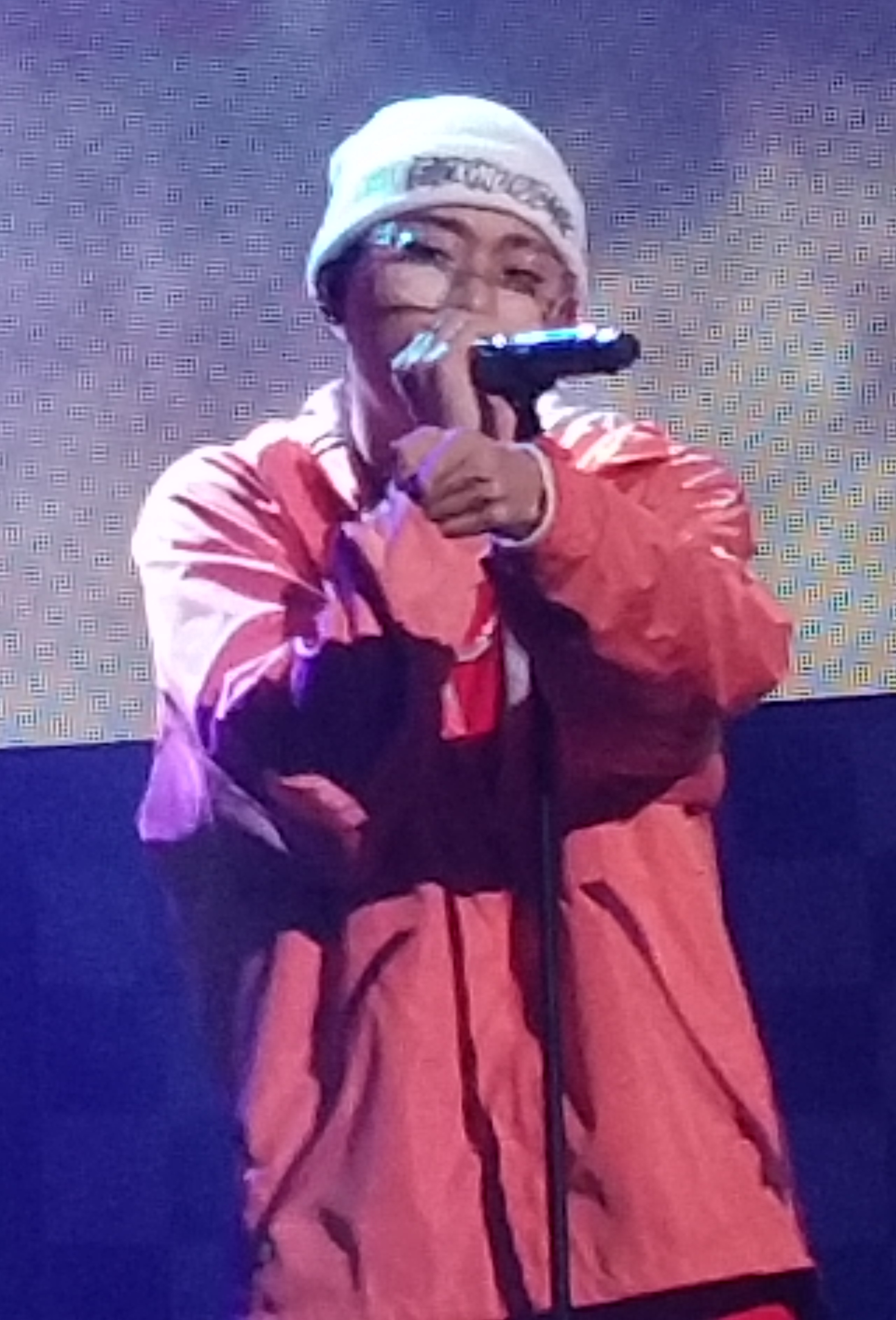
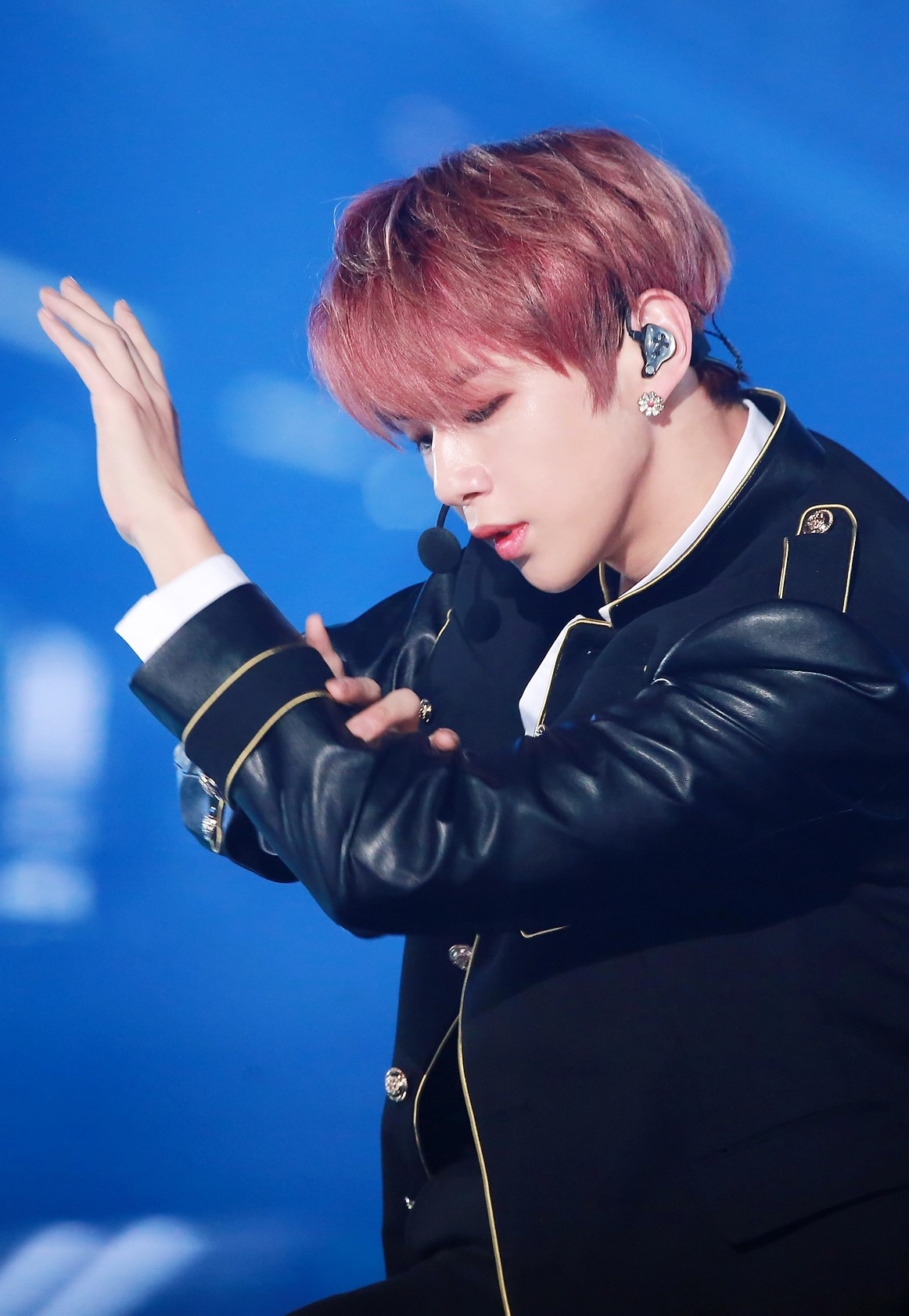
Soloists Zico (left) and Kang Daniel (right) received their first Show! Music Core awards for "Any Song" and "2U," respectively.

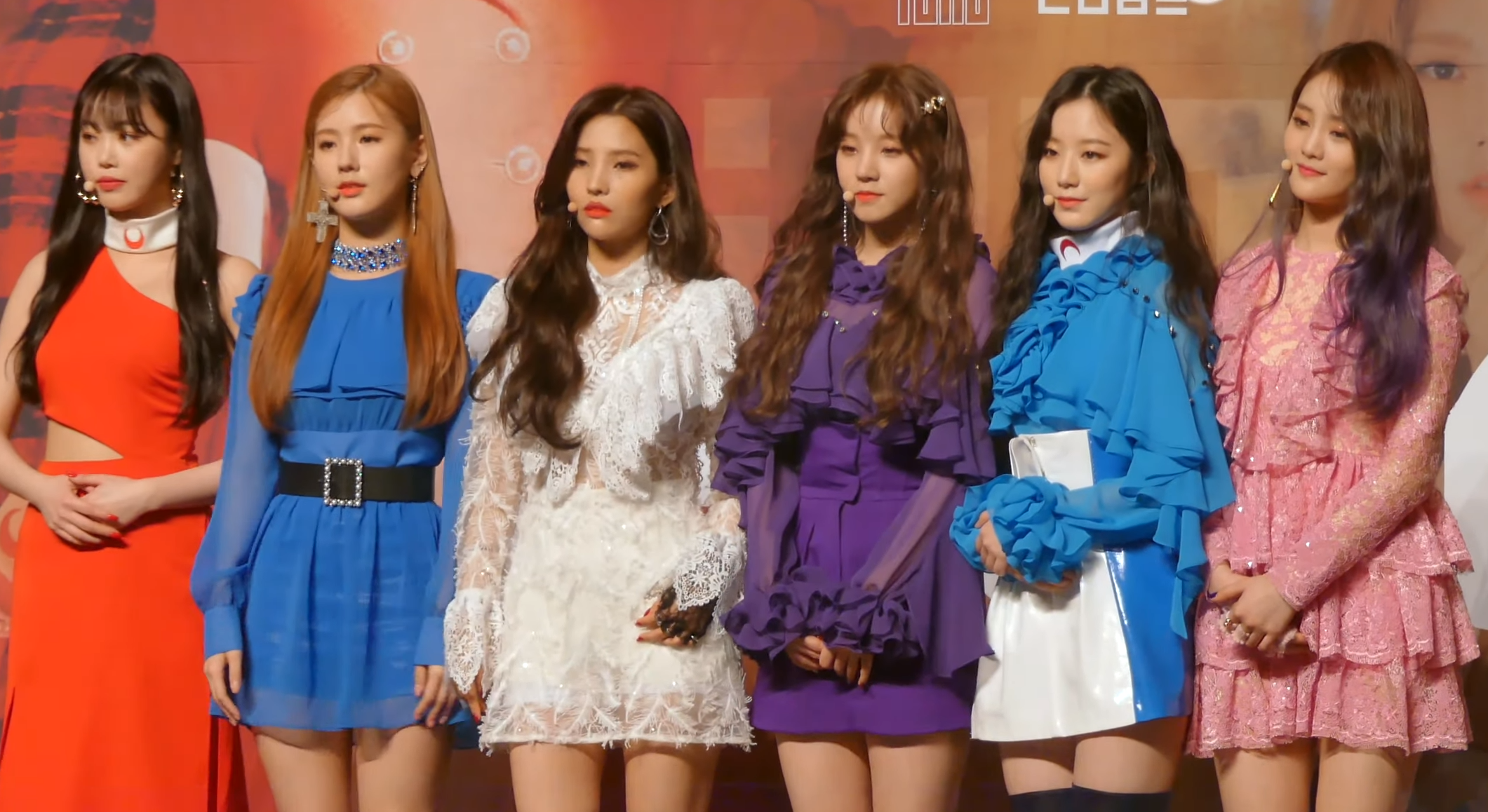
"Oh My God" by (G)I-dle served as the group's first win on the program.

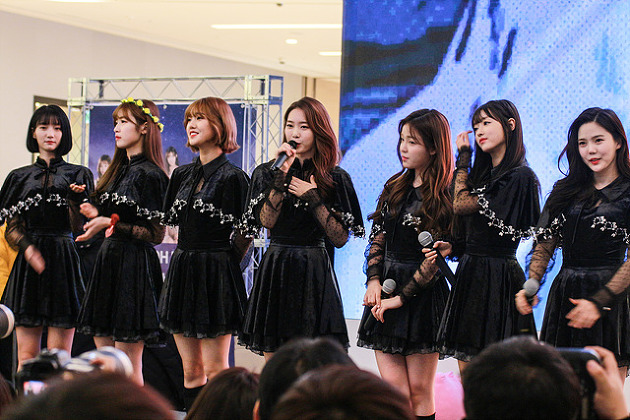
Oh My Girl received their first Show! Music Core trophy with "Nonstop."

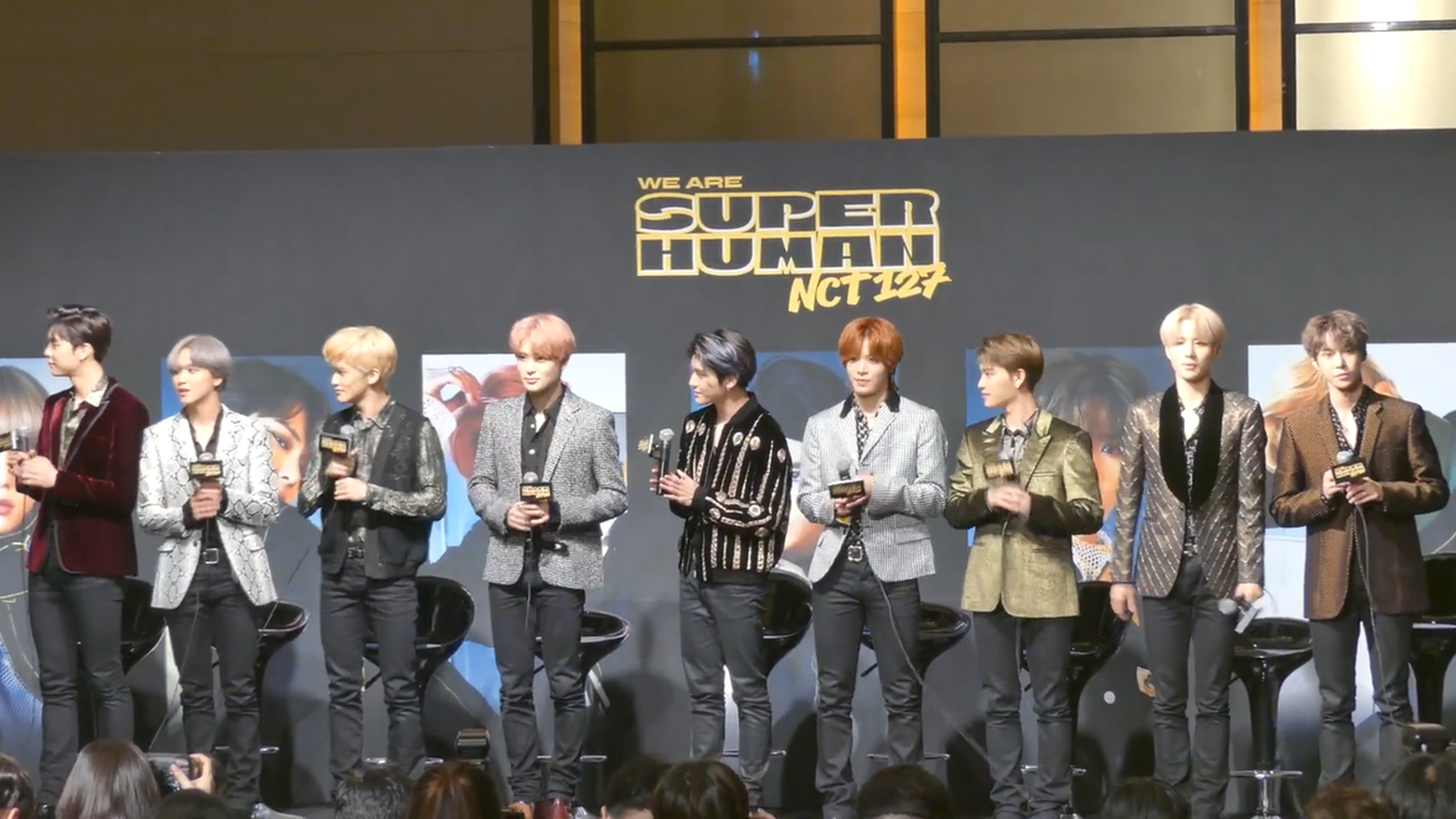
NCT 127 received their first Show! Music Core trophy with "Punch," making them the first NCT group to win first place on the program.

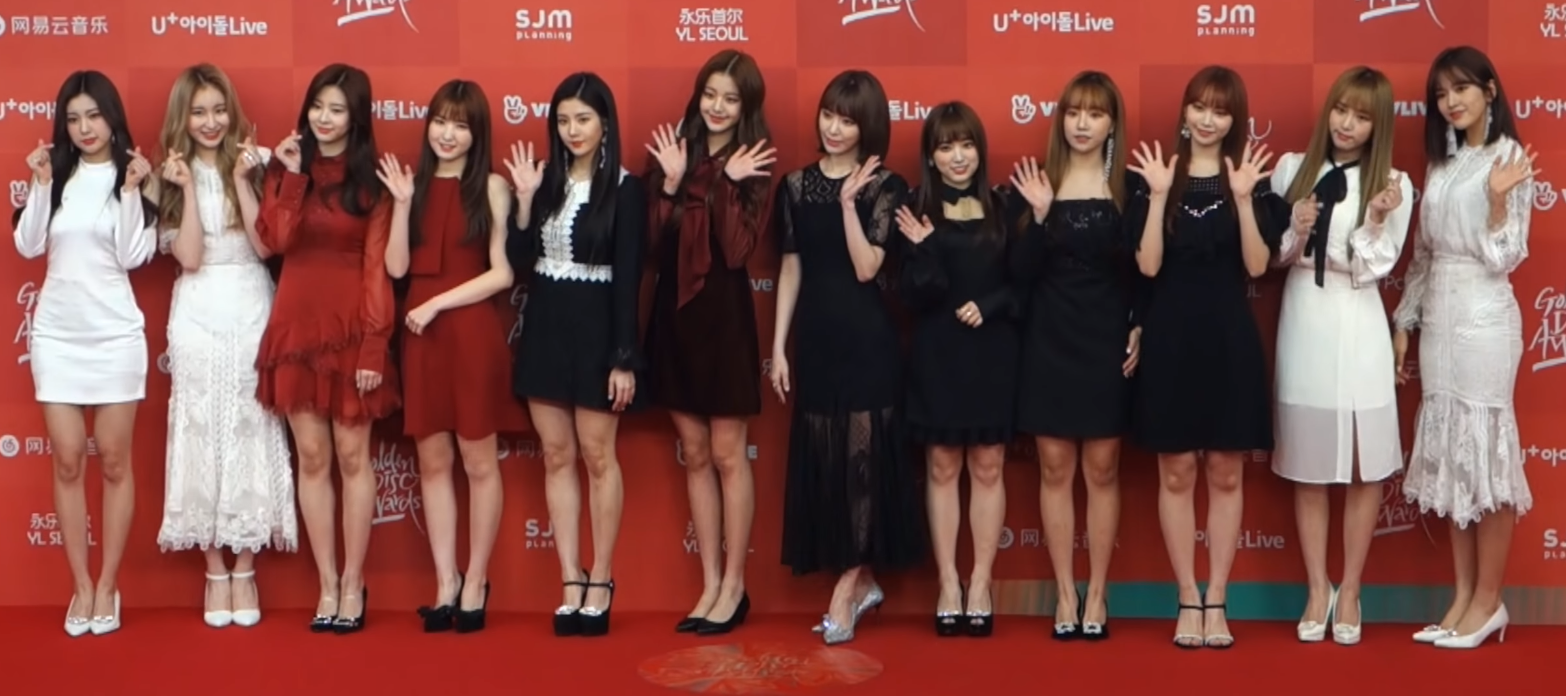
Iz*One, whose member Kim Min-ju also co-hosts the program, won their first award on Show! Music Core with "Secret Story of the Swan."

Key
	Highest score in 2020
—	No show was held

Episode	Date	Artist	Song	Points	Ref.
662	January 4	Red Velvet	"Psycho"	10,895	
663	January 11	Red Velvet	"Psycho"	9,398	
664	January 18	Red Velvet	"Psycho"	8,047	
—	January 25	No show, winners were not announced			
665	February 1	Zico	"Any Song"	8,267	
666	February 8	Zico	"Any Song"	7,630	
667	February 15	Zico	"Any Song"	6,900	
668	February 22	Zico	"Any Song"	7,001	
669	February 29	BTS	"On"	8,288	
670	March 7	BTS	"On"	10,518	
671	March 14	BTS	"On"	8,038	
672	March 21	BTS	"On"	8,516	
673	March 28	BTS	"On"	8,909	
674	April 4	Kang Daniel	"2U"	9,142	
675	April 11	Suho	"Let's Love"	9,861	
676	April 18	(G)I-dle	"Oh My God"	8,788	
677	April 25	Apink	"Dumhdurum"	10,780	
678	May 2	Apink	"Dumhdurum"	10,147	
679	May 9	Oh My Girl	"Nonstop"	9,433	
—	May 16	No show, winners were not announced			
680	May 23	NU'EST	"I’m in Trouble"	9,166	
681	May 30	NCT 127	"Punch"	9,374	
—	June 6	No show, winners were not announced			
682	June 13	Twice	"More & More"	10,871	
683	June 20	Twice	"More & More"	9,448	
684	June 27	Iz*One	"Secret Story of the Swan"	9,492	
685	July 4	Seventeen	"Left & Right"	8,540	
686	July 11	Blackpink	"How You Like That"	10,464	
687	July 18	Blackpink	"How You Like That"	10,048	
688	July 25	Blackpink	"How You Like That"	8,023	
689	August 1	SSAK3	"Beach Again"	8,399	
—	August 8	No show, winners were not announced			
690	August 15	Kang Daniel	"Who U Are"	7,384	
691	August 22	SSAK3	"Beach Again"	7,530	
692	August 29	BTS	"Dynamite"	8,882	
693	September 5	BTS	"Dynamite"	9,657	
694	September 12	BTS	"Dynamite"	9,755	
695	September 19	BTS	"Dynamite"	8,629	
696	September 26	BTS	"Dynamite"	10,602	
—	October 3	No show, winners were not announced			
697	October 10	BTS	"Dynamite"	10,319	
698	October 17	BTS	"Dynamite"	10,127	
699 (Note: [Let's DMZ] 'LIVE in DMZ 2020' Concert.)	October 24	No chart, winners were not announced			
700	October 31	BTS	"Dynamite"	9,864	
701	November 7	BTS	"Dynamite"	9,740	
702	November 14	BTS	"Dynamite"	10,130	
703 (Note: JUMF 2020 Festival Special.)	November 21	No chart, winners were not announced			
704	November 28	BTS	"Life Goes On"	10,656	
705	December 5	BTS	"Life Goes On"	11,881	
706	December 12	BTS	"Life Goes On"	10,981	
—	December 19	No show, winners were not announced			
707 (Note: Highlight special broadcast.)	December 26	No chart, winners were not announced			

== See also ==
- List of Show! Music Core Chart winners (2021)
