= Blockbuster (album) =

Studio album by Block B
- Released: October 19, 2012
- Recorded: 2012
- Studio: Stardom (Seoul)
- Genre: K-pop, hip hop
- Length: 46:20
- Language: Korean
- Label: Stardom/LOEN; L100004578 (Special Limited Edition); L100004577 (Student Edition)
- Producer: Zico

Block B chronology
Welcome to the Block (2012)	Blockbuster (2012)	Very Good (2013)

Singles from Blockbuster
- 1. "닐리리맘보 (Nillili Mambo)" Released: October 16, 2012

Blockbuster is the first studio album by South Korean boy band Block B. The music video Nillili Mambo was released on October 16, 2012.

== Release ==
Blockbuster was released on October 19, 2012. They released two different versions of the album: one was limited edition, and the other was the normal edition. The album reached number ten on the Billboard World Album Chart.

== Track listing ==
The album's tracks are as follows:

No.	Title	Lyrics	Music	Length
1.	"11:30"	Kyung, Zico	HARANHN, Ricky	3:35
2.	"Interlude"	-		0:26
3.	"Nillili Mambo" (닐리리맘보; Nillirimambo)	Zico	Zico, Pop Time	3:25
4.	"Mental Breaker"	Zico	Zico, Marcos Ubeda, Kevin Borg	3:28
5.	"No Joke" (장난없다; Jangnaneopda) (Zico, Kyung & P.O)	Zico, Kyung	Delly Boi	3:17
6.	"Movie's Over"	Zico	Zico, Jiyoung, and Bumzu	3:43
7.	"Where You At?" (넌 어디에; Neon eodie; 'Where are you') (Taeil Solo)	Taeil	Taeil	3:46
8.	"Dreams Come True" (로맨틱하게; Romaentikhage; 'Romantic')	Cho PD, Zico, P.O	Avian, Cho PD	3:54
9.	"Did You or Did You Not?" (했어 안했어; Haesseo anhaesseo; 'Did you do it or not?')	Kyung, Zico	Kyung, Zico	3:58
10.	"Halo"	Zico, Kyung	Zico	3:51
11.	"닐리리맘보" (Instrumental)	-	Zico, Pop Time	3:25
12.	"Mental Breaker" (Instrumental)	-	Zico, Marcos Ubeda, Kevin Borg	3:28
13.	"닐리리맘보" (Acappella Version*)	Zico	Zico and Pop Time	3:25
14.	"Mental Breaker" (Acappella Version*)	Zico	Zico, Marcos Ubeda, Kevin Borg	3:28
Total length:				46:20

== Chart rankings ==
The chart rankings are as follows:

Singles chart	Peak position
Billboard Korea	10
Gaon Album Chart	10

=== Sales and certifications ===
Chart	Amount
Gaon physical sales	39,130 (2012); 3,289 (2013); 5,417 (2014)
