= List of Show! Music Core Chart winners (2017) =

Show! Music Core Chart winners (2017)

Highlights
- Song with most wins: "Beautiful" by Wanna One (4)
- Artist(s) with most wins: Wanna One (6)
- Song with highest score: "Heart Shaker" by Twice (9,929)

The Show! Music Core Chart is a record chart on the South Korean MBC television music program Show! Music Core. Every week, the show awards the best-performing single on the chart in the country during its live broadcast. This is a list of 2017 winners.

== Chart history ==
Key
	Highest score in 2017
—	No show was held

Episode	Date	Artist	Song	Points	Ref.
548	April 22	Winner	"Really Really"	7,378	
549	April 29	IU	"Palette"	7,248	
550	May 6	IU	"Palette"	7,720	
551	May 13	Sechs Kies	"Be Well"	8,138	
552	May 20	Sechs Kies	"Be Well"	7,412	
553	May 27	Twice	"Signal"	8,448	
554	June 3	Twice	"Signal"	8,053	
555	June 10	Highlight	"Calling You"	7,636	
556	June 17	G-Dragon	"Untitled, 2014"	7,854	
557	June 24	G-Dragon	"Untitled, 2014"	7,359	
558	July 1	Mamamoo	"Yes I Am"	8,760	
559	July 8	Apink	"Five"	7,118	
560	July 15	Apink	"Five"	5,742	
561	July 22	Red Velvet	"Red Flavor"	9,427	
562	July 29	Special episode, winners were not announced			
563	August 5	Exo	"Ko Ko Bop"	9,316	
564	August 12	Exo	"Ko Ko Bop"	9,266	
565	August 19	Wanna One	"Energetic"	9,703	
566	August 26	Wanna One	"Energetic"	7,740	
567	September 2	Wanna One	"Energetic"	6,390	
—	No show, winners were not announced (September 9 – November 18)				
568	November 25	Wanna One	"Beautiful"	8,908	
569	December 2	Wanna One	"Beautiful"	8,291	
570	December 9	Wanna One	"Beautiful"	5,964	
571	December 16	Wanna One	"Beautiful"	5,922	
572	December 23	Twice	"Heart Shaker"	9,929	
—	December 30	No show, winners were not announced			
