= Thinking (album) =

- Part.1 digital cover

Studio album by Zico
- Released: September 30, 2019 (Part 1); November 8, 2019 (Part 2)
- Genres: K-pop; K-rap; dancehall; hip hop; R&B; ballad
- Length: 18:18 (Part 1); 18:10 (Part 2)
- Languages: Korean; English
- Labels: KOZ; Kakao M

Zico chronology
Television (2017)	Thinking (2019)	Random Box (2020)

Singles from Thinking Part.1
- 1. "Daredevil" Released: September 30, 2019; 2. "Human" Released: September 30, 2019

Part.2 digital cover

Singles from Thinking Part.2
- 1. "Being Left" Released: November 8, 2019

Thinking is the first studio album by South Korean rapper and producer Zico. This is the first work from Zico released by his own agency, KOZ Entertainment, and distributed by Kakao M. Thinking is made up of 2 EPs, which were released separately to digital music and streaming platforms. The first EP, Thinking Part.1, was released on September 30, 2019, and the second EP, Thinking Part.2, was released on November 8, 2019. The physical version of the album, with the combined EPs, was released on November 8, 2019.

His first full-length album in eight years, Zico, in an interview said he poured his true emotions into this album. He said, "I guess I’ve been mistreating myself. In the course of feeding 'Zico,' I found out that human 'Woo Ji-ho' [Zico's real name] was worn out, unaware of how to live, how to feel when left alone. I wanted to talk about those feelings in my new album. I always knew that I was struggling from my two distinct identities, but tried to ignore it and brush it off since I didn’t want to accept it. I didn’t want to ruin my character as 'Zico'. So I kept upping the tension, sometimes exaggerating my punky, wild image. I guess it was my way of confirming my self-esteem. But the gap grew wider and my emotions piled up to the point where I couldn’t breathe. So I decided to be honest to myself, show my vulnerability for the first time in my career." He added, “Some of the emotions were frankly some things that I didn't want to face. As 'Zico', there's the bright and energetic side. But as a human being, you have some sides to yourself that you don’t want to show. This is about that.” Thinking Part.1 is about "laying out the different emotions and thoughts people commonly have in their everyday lives", while Thinking Part.2 is more about the "detailed and intricate feelings or reactions that I have of those moments".

Thinking peaked third on the Gaon Music Chart.

== Track listing ==
Thinking Part.1 track listing
No.	Title	Lyrics	Music	Arrangement	Length
1.	"Daredevil" (feat. Jvcki Wai & Yumdda)	Zico; Jvcki Wai; Yumdda	Zico; Peejay; Jvcki Wai; Yumdda	Peejay	4:12
2.	"Actually"	Zico	Zico; Peejay	Peejay	3:37
3.	"Human"	Zico	Zico; Poptime	Zico; Poptime	3:57
4.	"Extreme"	Zico	Zico; Poptime	Zico; Poptime	2:27
5.	"One-man Show" (feat. Sik-K)	Zico; Sik-k	Zico; Poptime	Zico; Poptime	4:04
Total length:					18:18

Thinking Part.2 track listing
No.	Title	Lyrics	Music	Arrangement	Length
6.	"Another Level" (feat. Penomeco)	Zico; Penomeco	Zico; Penomeco; GooseBumps	GooseBumps; Zico	2:43
7.	"Being Left" (feat. Dvwn)	Zico	Zico; Brightenlight; Dvwn	Zico; Brightenlight	3:38
8.	"Dystopia"	Zico	Zico; Poptime	Zico; Poptime	3:57
9.	"Balloon"	Zico	Zico; Stay Tuned	Zico; Stay Tuned	3:38
10.	"The Language of Flowers" (feat. Jehwi)	Zico	Zico	So-jin Hong; Young-chan Kwon	4:12
Total length:					18:10

== Charts ==
Chart (2020)	Peak position
South Korean Albums (Gaon)	3

== Sales ==
Sales	Ref.
KOR: 12, 906	

== Release history ==
Release dates and formats for Thinking
Region	Date	Format(s)	Label	Notes	Ref.
Various	September 30, 2019	Digital download; streaming	KOZ Entertainment	Thinking Part.1	
Various	November 8, 2019	Digital download; streaming	KOZ Entertainment	Thinking Part.2	
South Korea	November 8, 2019	CD	KOZ Entertainment	Full album	

== See also ==
- Zico discography
