= Any Song =

2020 single by Zico

Single by Zico

from the EP Random Box
- Released: January 13, 2020
- Genre: Dancehall; hip hop
- Length: 3:47
- Label: KOZ; Kakao M
- Songwriter: Zico
- Producers: Zico; Poptime

Zico singles chronology
"Being Left" (2019)	"Any Song" (2020)	"Refresh" (2020)

Music video
- "Any Song" on YouTube

"Any Song" (Korean: 아무노래; RR: Amu norae; stylized in sentence case) is a song recorded by South Korean rapper Zico for his third extended play, Random Box (2020). The song was written and produced by Zico, with additional production from Poptime. It was released for digital download and streaming as a single on January 13, 2020, through KOZ Entertainment and Kakao M. Lyrically devoid of any characteristic message, the dancehall and hip hop song features an addictive chorus and sees Zico switching between rapping and singing.

"Any Song" was a commercial success in South Korea; it debuted atop the Gaon Digital Chart and remained the number one song for seven non-consecutive weeks, becoming the longest running chart topper on the chart. The song further charted at number one on the US Billboard K-pop Hot 100 and number four on the US World Digital Song Sales chart, in addition to charting within the top 10 in Malaysia and Singapore. "Any Song" was the most successful song of the first half of 2020 in South Korea and was certified platinum in the country by the Korea Music Content Association (KMCA). It received a nomination for Song of the Year at the 2020 Mnet Asian Music Awards.

An accompanying music video was uploaded to Kakao M's YouTube channel simultaneously with the single release, and features Zico hosting a house party for himself. Zico started a dance challenge on TikTok to promote the song. The challenge became viral after several South Korean celebrities responded to it. Zico first performed "Any Song" on You Hee-yeol's Sketchbook in March 2020. Although Zico did not promote the song on any South Korean weekly music program, it won first place on Inkigayo, Music Bank, and Show! Music Core.

== Background and composition ==
"Any Song" was written and produced by Zico, while additional production was handled by Poptime. In an interview with GQ Korea, Zico described "Any Song" as "a song made with a lighter heart." He elaborated on the process behind the songwriting in another interview:

"I wanted to make a song people could listen to when they're not thinking about anything. [...] and that was where the concept of ‘Any Song’ came about. If I found myself thinking or deliberating on something, I stopped and relied on instinct for this song. People are always thinking about so many different things, so I thought, at least since it's the beginning of the year, we could just enjoy this song without thinking about much. The song's message is that it has no message."

Musically, "Any Song" has been described as a hypnotic dancehall and hip hop song, featuring a bounce-style melody and "airy" lyrics. According to several media outlets, the song includes an "addictive" chorus that is backed by an "exciting" rhythm. Throughout the song, Zico switches effortlessly between singing and "trendy rapping." The song is composed in the key of A♯ minor, with a tempo of 108 beats per minute, and has a duration of 3:47. The lyrics revolve around the thoughts that cross one's mind at a party. Billboard's Tamar Herman described the song as "a witty tune that acts as if a lyrical stream of consciousness."

== Release and promotion ==
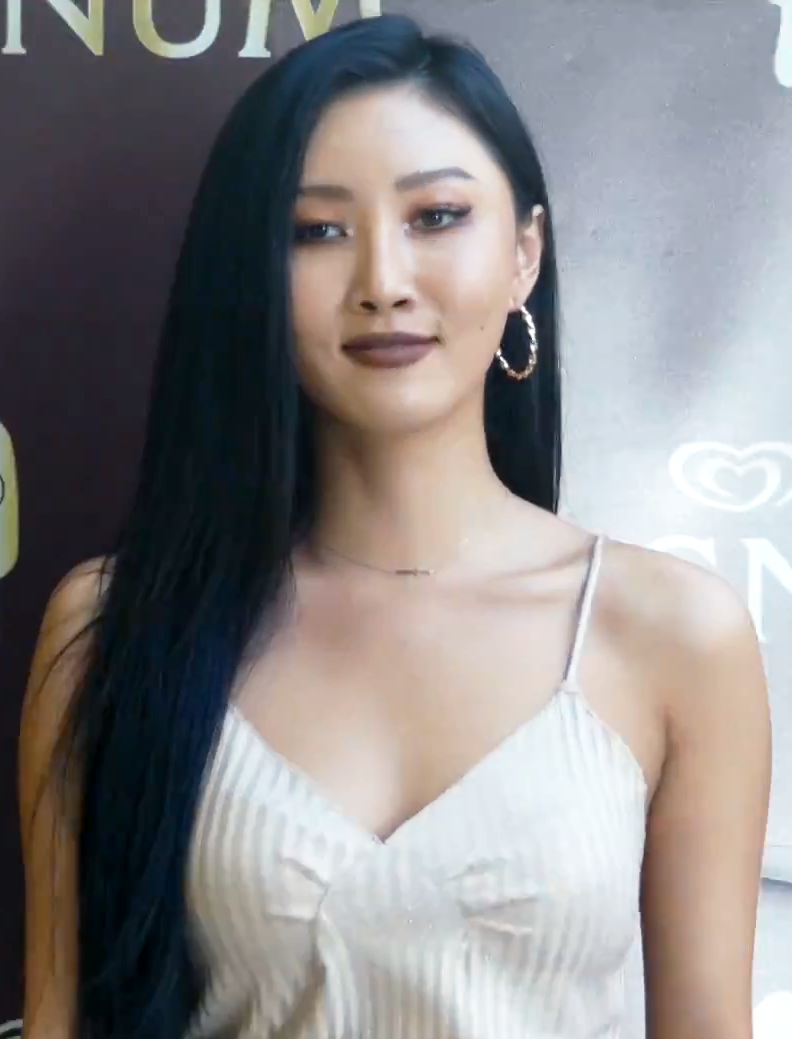
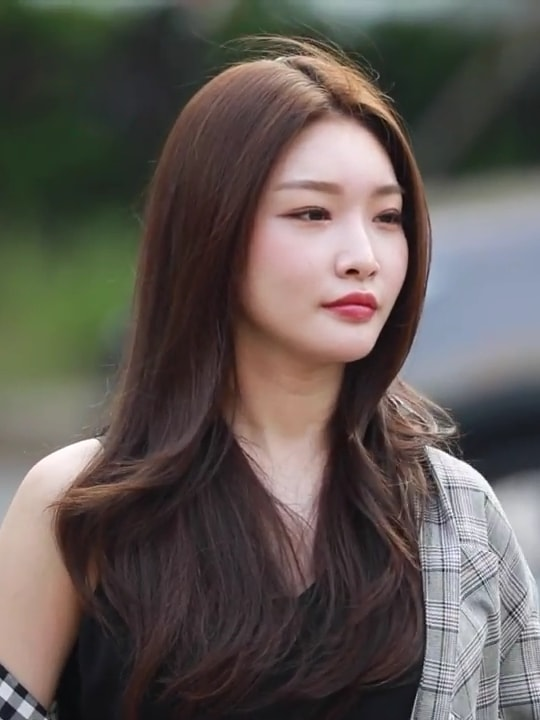
Hwasa (left) and Chungha (right) are among the celebrities who attempted Zico's "Any Song" dance challenge.

On January 7, 2020, KOZ Entertainment posted a concept teaser on its SNS account that announced the single's title of "Any Song", and its release date. The following day, Zico posted a concept photo on his Instagram account. "Any Song" was made available for digital download and streaming in various countries as a single by KOZ Entertainment and Kakao M. The song was included as the sixth track on Zico's third extended play Random Box, released on July 1, 2020.

The song quickly became viral after Zico started a dance challenge by posting videos of himself and South Korean singers Hwasa and Chungha dancing to "Any Song" on TikTok with the hashtag "Any Song Challenge". The challenge involved performing the "easy-to-follow" choreography by Zico to the track. Following the viral trend, numerous South Korean celebrities participated in the dance challenge, including Girls' Generation's Tiffany Young, Sandara Park, Lee Hyori, Crush, Park Shin-hye, Jang Sung-kyu, and Winner's Mino. The challenge started in South Korea, before becoming a trend internationally. The dance challenge videos received over 100 million cumulative views in 10 days and around 800 million in a month. On March 23, 2020, Zico performed "Any Song" live for the first time on the South Korean talk show You Hee-yeol's Sketchbook.

== Accolades ==
"Any Song" achieved the top spot on various South Korean weekly music programs, such as SBS' Inkigayo, KBS' Music Bank and MBC's Show! Music Core due to its success on digital platforms. The song won ten music show awards, including three consecutive wins that led to receiving the "triple crown" award on Inkigayo and four consecutive wins on Show! Music Core. It received a nomination for "Song of the Year" and won the "Best Hip-Hop & Urban Music" award at the 2020 Mnet Asian Music Awards.

Awards
Year	Organization	Award	Result	Ref.
2020	Mnet Asian Music Awards	Song of the Year	Nominated	
2020	Mnet Asian Music Awards	Best HipHop & Urban Music	Won	
2020	Genie Music Awards	Song of the Year - Daesang	Won	
2020	Genie Music Awards	Best Rap/Hip Hop	Won	
2020	Gaon Chart Music Awards	Song of the Year - January	Won	
2020	Golden Disc Awards	Digital Bonsang	Won	
2020	Golden Disc Awards	Trend of the Year	Won	

Music program awards
Program	Date	Ref.
Inkigayo	January 26, 2020	
Inkigayo	February 2, 2020	
Inkigayo	February 9, 2020	
Music Bank	January 31, 2020	
Music Bank	February 7, 2020	
Music Bank	February 21, 2020	
Show! Music Core	February 1, 2020	
Show! Music Core	February 8, 2020	
Show! Music Core	February 15, 2020	
Show! Music Core	February 22, 2020	

== Commercial performance ==
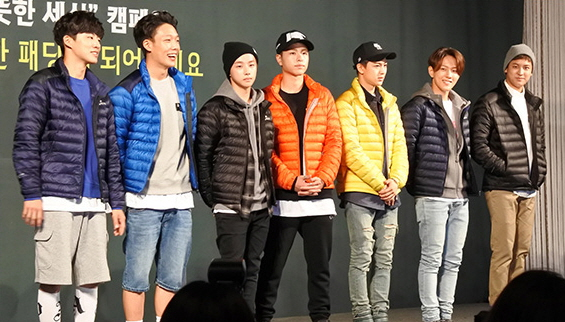
"Any Song" broke the record of iKon's "Love Scenario", to become the longest-running number one song on the Gaon Chart.

"Any Song" was a commercial success in South Korea. The song's commercial success has been attributed to its viral dance challenge. Upon its release, the song rose to the top position of every online streaming site's real-time charts including Melon, Soribada, Genie, Naver, Bugs, and Flo. It achieved an "all-kill" and became the first song of 2020 to do so. The song remained atop all real-time charts for a full week. On South Korea's largest digital music site, Melon, the track gained over 1.3 million listeners within 24 hours and remained at the top of the weekly chart for eight weeks. On January 18, 2020, "Any Song" debuted at number one on the Gaon Digital Chart and held its ranking for five consecutive weeks, tying with IU's "Good Day" (2010) and Psy's "Gangnam Style" (2012). The song fell down to number two on the week of February 22, 2020. In the first week of that year's March, "Any Song" regained its number one position and remained at the top spot for another week, tallying a total of seven non-consecutive weeks atop the chart, breaking the record for the most weeks at number one in the Gaon Chart's history, which was previously held by iKon's "Love Scenario" (2018). The song spent 17 consecutive weeks in the top 10 of the chart. The track also topped the Gaon component Streaming and Download charts for eight non-consecutive weeks and two consecutive weeks, respectively. "Any Song" was the best-performing song of the February 2020 issue of the Gaon Digital Chart and the second-best performing song in both January and March of the same year. It was the best-performing song of the first half of 2020 in South Korea, based on digital sales, streaming, and background music (instrumental track) downloads. "Any Song" was eventually certified platinum by the Korea Music Content Association (KMCA) denoting streams exceeding 100,000,000 units in the country.

"Any Song" debuted atop the US Billboard K-pop Hot 100 on January 18, 2020, and spent six consecutive weeks at the top position. Its streak was later broken by BTS' "On" (2020), which spent three weeks at number one. "Any Song" peaked at number four on the US Billboard World Digital Song Sales chart on the week of January 25, 2020, and became Zico's eighth entry and fourth song to reach the top five on the chart. The song remained on the chart for six consecutive weeks, and reached the top 10 of the charts in Malaysia and Singapore.

== Music video ==
An accompanying music video was uploaded to Kakao M's YouTube channel on January 13, 2020. The clip was preceded by two sets of video and photo teasers that were released on January 9 and January 10, 2020, respectively. The four-minute long visual opens with Zico's friends arriving at his house for a party. The video is interspersed with scenes depicting his friends having fun at the party without him. Throughout the clip, Zico is either forced to play games or is lifted into the air by his friends. As the video progresses, Zico feels dejected as he supposedly planned to have fun. When the party finishes, he puts on his headphones and begins dancing on his own. He is interrupted by his friends surprising him with a birthday cake. The music video ends with Zico leaving his friends and running outside of his house in quest for freedom and happiness.

== Track listing ==
- Digital download / streaming
1. "Any Song" – 3:47

== Credits and personnel ==
Credits and personnel are adapted from Melon.

- Zico – songwriter, vocals, producer
- Poptime – producer

== Charts ==
=== Weekly charts ===
Weekly chart performance for "Any Song"
Chart (2020)	Peak position
Malaysia (RIM)	8
New Zealand Hot Singles (RMNZ)	34
Singapore (RIAS)	7
South Korea (Gaon)	1
South Korea (K-pop Hot 100)	1
US World Digital Songs (Billboard)	4

=== Monthly chart ===
Monthly chart performance for "Any Song"
Chart (February 2020)	Peak position
South Korea (Gaon)	1

=== Year-end charts ===
Chart (2020)	Position
South Korea (Gaon)	1

== Certifications ==
Certifications and sales for "Any Song"
Region	Certification	Certified units/sales
Streaming
South Korea (KMCA)	Platinum	100,000,000^{†}
^{†} Streaming-only figures based on certification alone.

== Release history ==
Release date and formats for "Any Song"
Region	Date	Format(s)	Label(s)	Ref.
Various	January 13, 2020	Digital download; streaming	KOZ; Kakao M	

== See also ==
- List of Gaon Digital Chart number ones of 2020
- List of Inkigayo Chart winners (2020)
- List of Music Bank Chart winners (2020)
- List of Show! Music Core Chart winners (2020)
- List of K-pop Hot 100 number ones
