= Random Box =

EP by Zico
- Released: July 1, 2020
- Genre: K-pop; K-rap; dancehall; hip hop; R&B
- Language: Korean; English
- Label: KOZ; Kakao M

Zico chronology
Thinking (2019)	Random Box (2020)	Grown Ass Kid (2022)

Singles from Random Box
- 1. "Any Song" Released: January 13, 2020; 2. "Summer Hate (feat. Rain)" Released: July 1, 2020

Random Box (stylized in all caps) is the third extended play by South Korean rapper and producer, Zico. The EP was released on July 1, 2020, by KOZ Entertainment and Kakao M, in both digital and physical versions. The EP contains six tracks, including the previously released single "Any Song". On July 9, the Gaon Music Chart certified "Any Song" as platinum in streaming, and listed it as the most-streamed song in Korea for the first half of 2020. This is Zico's first EP under his production company, KOZ Entertainment; and his last EP before he enlisted in the South Korean army, as mandated.

== Track listing ==
All lyrics are written by Zico.

Random Box track listing
No.	Title	Music	Arrangement	Length
1.	"Summer Hate (feat. Rain)"	Zico; Poptime	Zico; Poptime	3:04
2.	"Cartoon" (만화영화)	Zico; Poptime	Zico; Poptime; brightenlight	3:10
3.	"Love & Hate (feat. Bibi)" (웬수)	Zico; Poptime	Zico; Poptime	3:16
4.	"No You Can't"	Zico; Poptime	Zico; Poptime	3:13
5.	"Roommate"	Zico; Noden	Noden; Zico	3:50
Total length:				16:35

Random Box CD bonus track
No.	Title	Music	Arrangement	Length
6.	"Any Song" (아무노래)	Zico; Poptime	Zico; Poptime	3:47
Total length:				20:23

== Charts ==
Chart (2020)	Peak position
South Korean Albums (Gaon)	8

== Sales ==
Region	Certification	Certified units/sales
South Korea	—	19,615

== See also ==
- Zico discography
