= Show! Music Core =

South Korean music television program

- Logo used since June 1, 2019
- Hangul: 쇼! 음악중심
- Hanja: 쇼! 音樂中心
- RR: Syo! Eumakjungsim
- MR: Syo! Ŭmakchungsim
- Genre: Music
- Presented by: Park Sung-ho (BoyNextDoor); Lee Sang-won (Alpha Drive One)
- Country of origin: South Korea
- Original language: Korean
- No. of episodes: 964

Production
- Running time: 80 minutes
- Production company: MBC Entertainment

Original release
- Network: MBC (live); MBC M (tape delay)
- Release: October 29, 2005 – present

Show! Music Core (Korean: 쇼! 음악중심; RR: Syo! Eumakjungsim), or simply Music Core is a South Korean music television program broadcast by MBC. It airs live every Saturday at 15:30 (KST). The show features some of the latest and most popular artists who perform live on stage. It is broadcast from MBC Dream Center in Goyang, Gyeonggi Province.

== History ==
Prior to the current Show! Music Core, numerous music programs with similar content were aired on MBC. Below is the list in chronological order.

| Broadcast date | Program name |
|---|---|
| October 30, 1989 – November 2, 1990 | Show Network (쇼 네트워크) |
| November 9, 1990 – April 30, 1993 | Everyone's Popular Songs (여러분의 인기가요) |
| May 7, 1993 – October 8, 1993 | Choice Best Popular Songs (결정 최고 인기가요) |
| April 21, 1995 – January 17, 1998 | Popular Songs Best 50 |
| January 24, 1998 – April 18, 1998 | Live Young Times (생방송 젊은 그대) |
| April 25, 1998 – January 23, 1999 | Music Camp (음악캠프) |
| February 30, 1999 – May 8, 1999 | Family Camp (가족캠프) |
| May 15, 1999 – July 30, 2005 | Live Music Camp |

Live Music Camp was cancelled due to a broadcast accident of revealing genitalia.

After a brief hiatus, Show! Music Core began airing on October 29, 2005, with charts similar to its predecessors. However, the charts were removed on January 7, 2006, and it continues to air without any charts or awards. Even without the weekly chart award, the show was known for its special production and stages.

From 2007 to 2008, a "Mobile Ranking" segment was used to rank the popularity of songs downloaded to mobile phones and from online music sites.

On March 11, 2013, MBC announced that they would return their chart system after seven years without the segment. The ranking system was reinstalled on April 20, 2013, with a first-place trophy given to the top song amongst the nominees for each week.

November 21, 2015, MBC announced that their chart system would be removed once again. The MBC variety department said: "Instead of the ranking system, we intend to show more diverse genres of music and continue to work hard to be a representative music program of Korea."

On February 11, 2016, MBC announced a trial phase of their simultaneous live broadcast of Show! Music Core in HD and UHD (ultra-high-definition) utilizing a dedicated 4K camera, in preparation for their launch of UHD broadcasts scheduled for 2017. The trial phase had taken place February 13 through March 12, 2016.

On April 5, 2017, MBC announced that they would, yet again, return to their chart ranking system since April 22, 2017.

In June 2023 MBC reactivated their YouTube channel MBC World. In October 2023 it was announced that the chart show is officially available for live streaming for fans worldwide.

== Hosts ==
List of hosts

Sungho

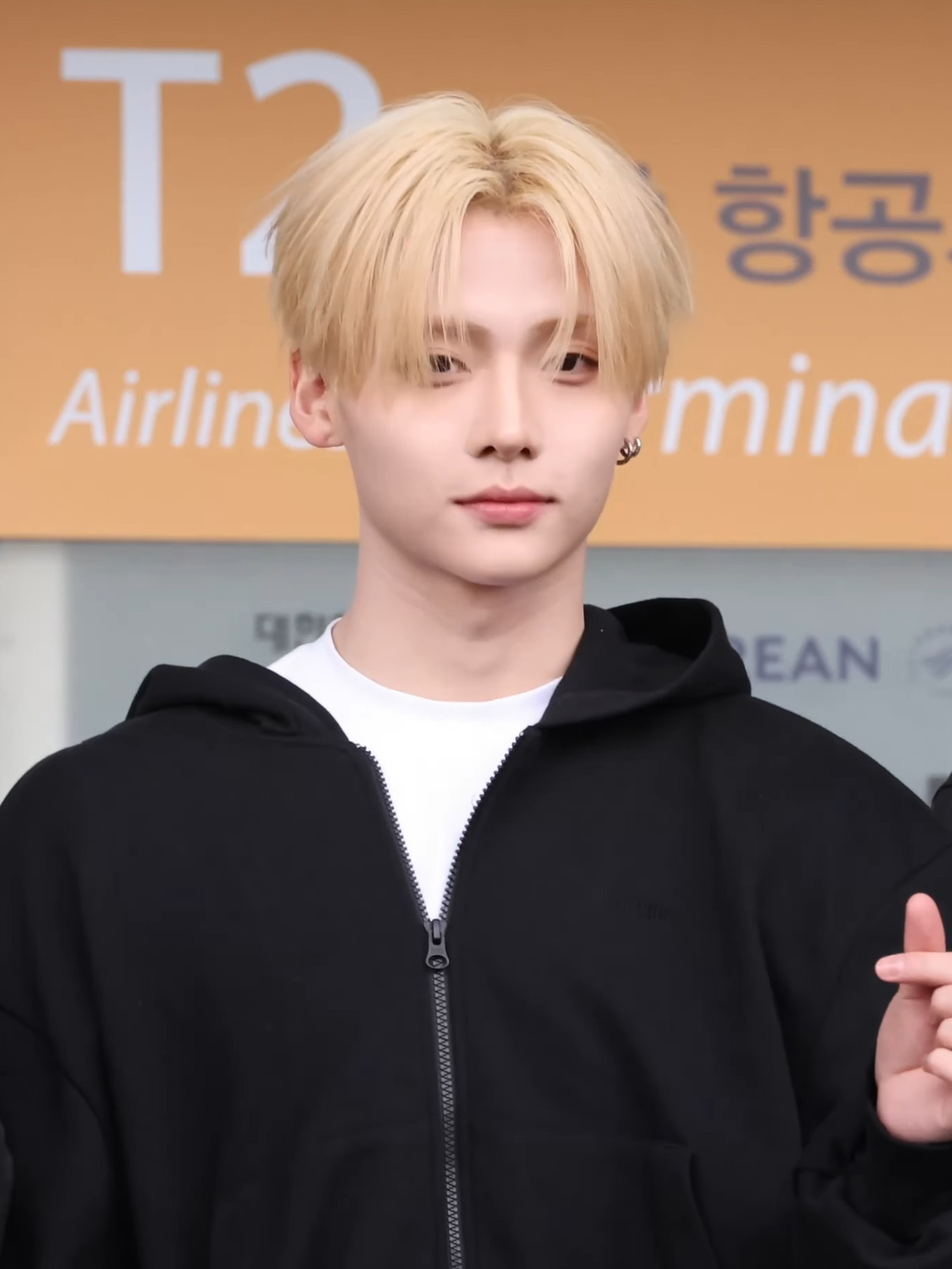
Sangwon

BoyNextDoor's Sungho (left), and Alpha Drive One's Sangwon (right) will be hosting the show from September 5, 2026

| Episodes | Date | Host(s) | Guest Host(s) |
|---|---|---|---|
| 1 - 25 | October 29, 2005 – April 29, 2006 | Shin Dong-wook, Hong Soo-ah | - |
| 26 - 49 | May 6 – November 4, 2006 | Brian (Note: Brian was absent for episode 27, (May 13, 2006), episode 29, (May 27, 2006), episode 48, (October 21, 2006), and episode 49 (November 4, 2006)), Jang Mi-inae | (Note: Lee Seung-gi (ep. 27, May 13, 2006); Park Myung-soo (ep. 29, May 27, 2006), Jun Jin (ep. 48, October 21, 2006); MC Mong (ep. 49, November 4, 2006)) |
| 50 - 68 | November 11, 2006 – March 31, 2007 | Brian, Kim Hyun-joong (Note: Kim Hyunjoong was absent for episode 58, dated January 13, 2007) | (Note: T.O.P & G-Dragon (ep. 58, January 13, 2007)) |
| 69 - 74 | April 7 - May 19, 2007 | Brian | (Note: Bae Seul-ki (ep. 69, April 7, 2007); Yeeun (ep. 70, April 14, 2007); Ahn So-hee (ep. 70 (April 14, 2007), ep. 73 (May 12, 2007)); Sunmi (ep.70, April 14, 2007); Hyuna (ep.70 (April 14, 2007), ep. 73 (May 12, 2007)); Sunye (ep. 70, April 14, 2007); Younha (ep. 71, April 21, 2007); Ivy (ep. 72, April 28, 2007)) |
| 75 - 80 | May 26 – June 30, 2007 | Brian, Ahn So-hee (Note: Ahn Sohee was absent for episodes 79-80, dates June 23 - 30, 2007), Hyuna | - |
| 81 - 96 | July 7 – November 3, 2007 | Brian (Note: Brian was absent for episode 85, dated August 4, 2007), Kang-in (Note: Kangin was absent for episode 82, dated July 14, 2007) | (Note: Dana (ep. 82, July 14, 2007); Sunday (ep. 82, July 14, 2007);) |
| 97 - 117 | November 10, 2007 – April 26, 2008 | T.O.P (Note: T.O.P was absent for episode 103 (January 5, 2008), episode 114 (March 29, 2008), and episode 116 (April 12, 2008)), Ahn So-hee (Note: Ahn Sohee was absent for episodes 105-106, dates January 19 - 26, 2008 and episodes 109-111 dates February 23 - March 8, 2008), Sunye (Note: Sunye was absent for episode 105 (January 19, 2008) and episodes 109-111 dates February 23 - March 8, 2008) | (Note: G-Dragon (ep. 103 (January 5, 2008), ep. 105 (January 19, 2008), ep. 109-111 (February 23 - March 8, 2008)); Taeyang (ep. 105, January 19, 2008); Daesung (ep. 105, January 19, 2008); Seungri (ep. 105, January 19, 2008); Yubin (ep. 114 (March 29, 2008), ep. 116 (April 12, 2008)); Yeeun (ep. 114 (March 29, 2008), ep. 116 (April 12, 2008)); Sunmi (ep. 114 (March 29, 2008), ep. 116 (April 12, 2008))) |
| 118 - 159 | May 10, 2008 – March 28, 2009 | Seungri (Note: Seungri was absent for episode 120 (May 24, 2008), episode 122 (June 7, 2008) episode 132 (August 16, 2008), and episode 152 (January 31, 2009)), Daesung (Note: Daesung was absent for episode 120 (May 24, 2008), episode 122 (June 7, 2008), episode 132 (August 16, 2008), episode 152 (January 31, 2009), and episode 156 (March 7, 2009)), Sol Bi | (Note: Andy (ep. 120, May 24, 2008); all members of SS501 (ep. 122, June 7, 2008); Lee Jaehoon (ep. 132, August 16, 2008); Kim Sungsoo (ep. 132, August 16, 2008); Yunho (ep. 140, November 1, 2008); Max Changmin (ep. 140, November 1, 2008); all members of Girls' Generation (ep. 152, January 31, 2009)) |
| 160 - 219 | April 4, 2009 – July 31, 2010 | Tiffany (Note: Tiffany was absent for episode 165 (May 9, 2009), 180 dated September 5, 2009 and episode 182 dated September 19, 2009 2010 episode dated June 19), Yuri (Note: Yuri was absent for episode 165 (May 9, 2009) dated March 6, 2010) | (Note: Leeteuk (ep. 165, May 9, 2009); Kangin (ep. 165, May 9, 2009); Jay Park (ep. 165, May 9, 2009); Nichkhun (ep. 165, May 9, 2009); Seohyun (ep. 180 (September 5, 2009), ep. 182 (September 19, 2009), ep. 213 (June 19, 2010)); Sooyoung (ep. 180 (September 5, 2009) ep. 182 (September 19, 2009)); Oh Sang-jin (ep. 181, September 12, 2009);Sunye (ep. 210 May 29, 2010); Yubin (ep. 210, May 29, 2010); Yonghwa (ep. 2010 (May 29, 2010), ep. 213 (June 19, 2010)); Eunhyuk (ep. 211, June 5, 2010); Siwon (ep. 211, June 5, 2010); Krystal (ep. 211, June 5, 2010); Seungyeon (ep. 212, June 12, 2010); Hara (ep. 212, June 12, 2010); Kim Hyun-joong (ep. 212, June 12, 2010);) |
| 220 - 231 | August 7 - October 23, 2010 | Various Guest Hosts | (Note: Krystal Jung (August 7, August 14); Onew (August 7, August 14); Nichkhun (August 14); Suzy (August 14); IU (August 21); Doojoon (August 21); Gikwang (August 21); Jinwoon (August 28); Hyomin (August 28); Jiyeon (August 28); Oh Sang-jin (September 4); Hyuna (September 11, 2010); Hongki (September 11, 2010); Sunhwa (September 11, 2010); Eunhyuk (September 18, 2010); Lizzy (September 18, 2010); Krystal (September 18, 2010); Shin Hyun-joon (September 25, 2010); Jung Joon-ho (September 25, 2010); Oh Sang-jin (October 2, 2010), Son Dam-bi (October 2, 2010); Sandara Park (October 9, 2010), Minzy (October 9, 2010); Key (October 16, 2010), Taemin (October 16, 2010); Min (October 16, 2010); Junho (October 23, 2010); Chansung (October 23, 2010)) |
| 232 - 266 | October 30, 2010 – July 9, 2011 | Onew, Minho, Suzy, Jiyeon | - |
| 267 - 279 | July 16 – October 8, 2011 | Suzy, Jiyeon | - |
| 280 - 292 | October 15, 2011 – January 28, 2012 | Tiffany, Yuri | - |
| 293 - 294 | February 4 - 11, 2012 | Various Guest Hosts | (Note: Hongki (ep. 293, February 4, 2012); Jaejin (ep. 293, February 4, 2012); Jonghoon (ep. 293, February 4, 2012); Chunji (ep. 294, February 11, 2012); Niel (ep. 294, February 11, 2012); L.Joe (ep. 294, February 11, 2012)) |
| 295 - 354 | February 18, 2012 - April 13, 2013 | Taeyeon, (Note: Taeyeon was absent for the 2012 episodes dated April 7, July 28, August 4, August 18, August 25, September 22, September 29, October 20, November 10, November 24, December 1, and the 2013 episodes dated January 19, February 9, February 23, March 9, March 16 and April 6) Seohyun, (Note: Seohyun was absent for the 2012 episodes dated July 28, August 4, August 18, August 25, September 22, September 29, October 20, November 10, November 24, December 1, and the 2013 episodes dated January 19, February 9, February 23, March 9, March 16 and April 6) Tiffany (Note: Tiffany was absent for the 2012 episodes dated February 18, April 7, July 28, August 4, August 18, August 25, September 22, September 29, October 20, November 10, November 24, December 1, and the 2013 episodes dated January 19, February 9, February 23, March 9, March 16 and April 6) | (Note: Hyoyeon, Yonghwa (April 7); Eunhyuk, Kyuhyun, Ji-yeon (July 28); Doo-joon, Bora (August 4, 18, 25); Dasom (August 4); Yoseob (August 18, 25); Siwan, Zinger (September 22); Kwanghee, Sunhwa (September 22, 29); Hyoseong (September 29) Hyoseong (October 20); Sunhwa (October 20); Daehyun (November 10); Min (November 10); Suzy (November 10); Sunhwa (November 24);) |
| 355 - 414 | April 20, 2013 – July 12, 2014 | Minho, (Note: Minho was absent for the 2013 episodes dated June 29, July 6, August 3, August 10, August 24, October 5, October 19, October 26, and November 30 as well as the 2014 episodes dated January 4, January 18, February 8, April 5, May 31, June 7.) Kim So-hyun, (Note: Kim Sohyun was absent for the episode dated May 31, 2014.) Noh Hong-chul (Note: Noh Hongchul was absent for the 2014 episodes dated July 5 and July 12.) | (Note: Haha (June 29); Park Hyung-sik (July 6, August 3, August 10); Yang Yo-seob (August 24);) |
| 415 - 453 | July 19, 2014 – April 25, 2015 | Minho, (Note: Minho was absent for the 2015 episodes dated March 21 and April 25.) Kim So-hyun, (Note: Sohyun was absent for the 2015 episode dated April 25) Zico (Note: Zico was absent for the 2014 episodes dated August 30 and September 13 and the 2015 episode dated April 25.) | (Note: Goo Hara (August 30); Lee Junho (September 13); SinB (March 21); Kangnam, Bomi, Kyunsung (April 25)) |
| 454 - 479 | May 2 – November 14, 2015 | Minho, N, Yeri | - |
| 480 - 523 | November 21, 2015 – September 24, 2016 | Kim Sae-ron, Kim Min-jae | - |
| 524 - 547 | October 1, 2016 – April 15, 2017 | Kim Sae-ron, Cha Eun-woo, Lee Soo-min | - |
| 548 - 577 | April 22, 2017 – February 3, 2018 | Cha Eun-woo, (Note: Cha Eun Woo was absent for the 2017 episode dated September 2 (ep. 567) and the 2018 episodes dated January 20 (ep. 575) and February 3 (ep. 577).) Xiyeon (Note: Xiyeon was absent for the 2017 episode dated December 16, 2017 (ep. 571), and the 2018 episodes dated January 20 (ep. 575) and February 3 (ep. 577)) | (Note: Wendy and Jung Yong-hwa (July 29, ep. 562); N (September 2, ep. 567); Jeong Yeon and Na Yeon (December 16, ep. 571); Seong-jong and Ji Ho a former member of Oh My Girl (January 20, ep. 575); Bobby, B.I, Yeri (February 3, ep. 577)) |
| 578 - 603 | February 24 – September 22, 2018 | Ong Seong-wu, (Note: Ong Seong-wu absent for the 2018 episodes dated May 12 (ep. 587), June 2 (ep. 590), June 23 (ep. 593), June 30 (ep. 594), July 7 (ep. 595), July 14 (ep. 596), July 21 (ep. 597), August 4 (ep. 599) and August 11 (ep. 600), August 18 (ep. 601), September 8 (ep. 602).) Mina, Mark (Note: Mark Lee was absent for the 2018 episodes dated April 28 (ep. 586), May 19 (ep. 588), June 23 (ep. 593), and August 11 (ep. 600).) | (Note: Onew and Lee Taemin (June 23, ep. 593); Choi Minho and Noh Hong-chul (August 11, ep. 600)) |
| 604 - 617 | September 29, 2018 – January 12, 2019 | Mina, (Note: Mina was absent for the 2018 episode dated December 8, 2018 (ep. 612) as well as the 2019 episodes dated October 19 (ep. 652) and November 9 (ep. 655)) Mark Lee (Note: Mark was absent for the 2018 episodes dated October 6 (ep. 605) and October 27 (ep. 608).) | (Note: Park Sung-kwang (October 6, 13, ep.605 and 606 ); Juyeon (October 6. ep. 605); Shownu, Minhyuk, Bomin, Donghyun, Hyunjin and Bang Chan from Stray Kids (all for ep. 608, October 27); Chanyeol (November 17, ep. 610); Cha Eun-woo (December 8, ep. 612, December 15, ep. 613) and Kang Seung-yoon (December 22, ep. 614).) |
| 618 - 620 | January 19 - February 2, 2019 | Mina, Cha Eun-woo | (Note: CNU (January 19, ep. 618)) |
| 621 - 681 | February 16, 2019 – May 30, 2020 | Mina, (Note: Mina was absent for the episode dated December 8, 2018 (ep. 612) as well as the 2019 episodes dated October 19 (ep. 652) and November 9 (ep. 655).) Chani, (Note: Chani was absent for the 2019 episodes dated April 20 (ep. 629), April 27 (ep. 630), May 11 (ep. 631), August 10 (ep. 644), August 17 (ep. 645), September 21 (ep. 649), November 16 (ep. 656), December 7 (ep. 658), December 21 (ep. 660), and December 28 (ep. 661) as well as the 2020 episode dated February 29 (ep. 669).) Hyunjin (Note: Hyunjin was absent for the 2019 episodes dated February 23 (ep. 622), April 27 (ep. 630), May 18 (ep. 632), August 3rd (ep. 643), September 28 (ep. 650), November 2 (ep. 654), and November 23 (ep. 657) and for the 2020 episodes dated February 1 (ep. 665), February 8 (ep. 666), February 15 (ep. 667)) | (Note: Kang Seung-yoon (April 27, ep. 630); Q from The Boyz (May 11, ep. 631); Bae Jin-young (August 10, ep. 643); I.N (September 21, ep. 649, December 28, ep. 661); Inseong (September 28, ep. 650); Yeji from Itzy (October 19, ep. 652); Ren (November 2, ep. 654); Kim Sejeong (November 9, ep. 655) Hyojin (November 16, ep. 656); Park Ji-hoon (December 7, ep. 658); and Kim Jae-hwan (December 21, ep. 660) for 2019. For 2020, this includes Hongjoong from ATEEZ (Feb 01, ep. 665); Jangjun from Golden Child (band) (Feb 08, ep. 666); Hongseok (Feb 15, ep. 667); Chuu (Feb 29, ep. 669)) |
| 682 - 713 | June 13, 2020 – February 6, 2021 | Chani, Hyunjin, Kim Min-ju | - |
| 714 - 721 | February 20 - April 24, 2021 | Chani, Kim Min-ju | (Note: Kim Hyun-soo (Feb 20, ep. 714); Yeji (Feb 27, ep. 715); Choi Minho (March 6, ep. 716); Kim Se-jeong (March 13, ep. 717); Park Ji-hoon (March 20, ep. 718); Mina (March 27, ep. 719); Joohoney (April 17, ep. 720); Cha Eun-woo (April 24, ep. 721)) |
| 722 - 733 | May 1 – July 17, 2021 | Chani, Kim Min-ju, Yeji | (Note: Mark Lee (May 29, ep. 726);) |
| 734 - 794 | August 14, 2021 - January 28, 2023 | Kim Min-ju, (Note: Kim Minju was absent for the 2022 episode dated September 17 (ep. 779) and the 2023 episode dated January 14 (ep. 793)) Jungwoo, (Note: Jungwoo was absent for the 2021 episode dated December 18 (ep. 751) and the 2022 dates of May 21 - June 4 (ep. 766-767), July 2 (ep. 770), August 13 - September 17 (ep. 775-779), October 8-22 (ep. 782-783), December 3-10 (ep. 788-789), as well as the 2023 episodes dated January 7-28 (ep. 792-794).) Lee Know (Note: Lee Know was absent for the 2022 episodes dated January 15 (ep. 754), January 22 (ep. 756), March 16-26 (ep. 759-760), April 30 (ep. 763), June 11 - July 23 (ep. 768-773), September 17 (ep. 779), November 12-19 (ep. 785-786), and December 3 (ep. 788) as well as the 2023 episode dated January 7 (ep. 792).) | (Note: Na Jae-min (ep. 751, December 18, 2021); Chani (ep. 754, January 15, 2022); Juyeon (ep. 755, January 22, 2022); Jaejun (ep. 758-759, March 12–19, 2022); Han (ep. 760, March 26, 2022; ep. 783, October 22, 2022); Cha Eun-woo (May 21, ep. 766); Jo Yu-ri (June 4, ep. 767); Kim Jaehwan (June 11, ep. 678, September 17, ep. 779); Dahyun (June 25 - July 2, ep. 769-770, September 17, ep. 779); Kang Seung-yoon (July 9, 771); Yeji (ep. 772-773, July 16-23, 2022; ep. 788, December 3, 2022); Juyeon from The Boyz (August 20, ep. 776); Seungmin from Stray Kids (October 8, ep. 782); Doyoung (November 12, ep. 785); Lia (ep. 788, December 3, 2022) Moonbin & Sanha (ep. 792, January 7, 2023), Joohoney (ep. 793, January 14, 2023); Minhyuk (ep. 793, January 14, 2023)) |
| 795 - 803 | February 4, 2023 - April 8, 2023 | Jungwoo (Note: Jungwoo was absent for the episode dated February 25 (ep. 798).) and Lee Know (Note: Lee Know was absent for the episodes dated February 4 - March 11 (ep. 795-800) and March 25 - April 8 (ep. 802-803).) | (Note: Johnny from NCT (February 4-11, ep. 795-796; April 8, ep. 803); Park Si-eun (February 18, ep. 797); Hyunjae and Q from The Boyz (February 25, ep. 798); Younghoon and Juyeon from The Boyz (February 25 - March 4, ep. 798-799); Kang Mi-na (March 11, ep. 800); Chani (March 11, ep. 800); Sullyoon (March 25, ep. 802)) |
| 804 - 831 | April 15 - November 4, 2023 | Jungwoo, (Note: Jungwoo was absent for the episodes dated May 27 (ep. 810), June 24 (ep. 814), July 22 (ep. 818), August 19 - 26 (ep. 822-823), September 9-23 (ep. 825-827), October 21-28 (ep. 829-830)) Lee Know, (Note: Lee Know was absent for the episodes dated May 13 (ep. 808), July 01 (ep. 815), July 22 (ep. 818), August 19 (ep. 822), September 2-23 (ep. 824-827), and October 21-28 (ep. 829-830).) Sullyoon (Note: Sullyoon was absent for the 2023 episodes dated May 6-13 (ep. 807-808), August 19 (ep. 822), and October 14 (ep. 828)) | (Note: Karina (May 13, ep. 808); Lee Min-hyuk (May 13, ep. 808); Changbin (June 24, ep. 814), Yunho (July 01, ep. 815) Jun Hyun-moo (July 22, ep. 818); Haewon (July 22, ep. 818); Ju Haknyeon and Sunwoo of The Boyz (August 19, ep. 822; September 16, ep. 826), and Eric of The Boyz (August 19, ep. 822); Mark Lee (September 2, ep. 824); Eunseok of Riize (September 9, ep. 825; October 28, ep. 830 ), Key (September 23, ep. 827); Seunghee (September 23, ep. 827); Seunghan formerly of Riize (October 28, ep. 830); Bae & Kyujin) |
| 832 - 888 | November 11, 2023 – February 15, 2025 | Sullyoon, (Note: Sullyoon was absent for the 2023 episode and December 9 (ep. 836).) Lee Jung-ha, Younghoon (Note: Younghoon was absent for the 2023 episode dated December 9 (ep. 836) and the 2024 episodes dated January 13 (ep. 838) and February 3 (ep. 841).) | (Note: Lee Mi-joo and Park Jin-joo (December 9, ep. 836), Eric (January 13, 2024, ep. 838), Dohoon (February 3, ep. 841)) |
| 890 - 944 | March 1, 2025 – May 2, 2026 | A-Na, Dohoon, and Kim Gyu-vin | (Note: Bang Jee-min, Minje and Leesol (March 29, ep. 893), Leesol and Sui (April 12, ep. 895), Kyungmin (April 26, ep. 897 and October 25, ep. 920), Youngjae (May 3, ep. 898 and November 1, ep. 921), Narin (May 9, ep.899), Lee Jung-ha (June 28, ep. 906), Beomgyu (August 2, ep. 810), Haruto, Park Jeong-woo and Yoon Jae-hyuk (Treasure) (September 20, ep, 916), Hearts2Hearts (October 4, ep. 918), Jihoon (October 18, ep. 919 and December 27, ep. 927), Sunwoo (November 15, ep. 922), Woochan (November 22, ep. 923), Jungwoo and Mark (November 29, ep. 924), Song Ha-young, Park Ji-won and Baek Ji-heon (Fromis 9) (December 6, ep. 925), Kangmin and Chuei Liyu (December 13, ep. 926), Park Cho-rong and Yoon Bo-mi (January 10, 2026, ep. 928), Sunoo (January 17, ep. 929), Sui (January 31, ep. 931), Yuha (March 7, ep. 937) and Kim Chaewon (April 25, ep. 943)) |
| 945 - 960 | May 9, 2026 - August 22, 2026 | Dohoon and Kim Gyu-vin | (Note: Sakuya and Wonhee (May 9, ep. 945), Wonhee (May 16, ep. 946), Sullyoon (May 23, ep. 947), Martin and Kazuha (May 30, ep. 948), Karina (June 6, ep. 949), Rora (June 13, ep. 950 and August 8, ep. 958), Sungho and Sooin (June 20, ep. 951), Seeun and Yoon (STAYC) (June 27, ep. 952), Yuha, Stella and A-na (Hearts2Hearts) (July 4, ep. 953), Asa and Rora (Babymonster) (July 11, ep. 954), Zhang Hao and Yoo Seung-eon (July 18, ep. 955), Song Ha-young, Lee Na-gyung and Baek Ji-heon (Fromis 9) (July 25, ep. 956), Jeon So-young (August 15, ep. 959) and Tomoya, So Geon and Yuki (Nexz) (August 29, ep. 961)) |
| 962 - present | September 5, 2026 - present | Sungho and Sangwon | |

== Chart system ==
Music Core brought back the show's chart on April 20, 2013. First-place winners are determined using the ranking system below. The list also shows the current and former scoring computation used. As of June 8, 2013, four nominees had decreased to three nominees. This chart is called M-chart, and tracking from Monday to Monday of the following week.

| Period covered | Chart system | | | | |
| Period covered | Broadcast | Digital sales | Physical album | Video views | Voting |
|---|---|---|---|---|---|
| April 20 – 27, 2013 | N/A | 30% | 10% | 15% | 45% (20% committee + 25% live-vote) |
| May 4, 2013 – June 1, 2013 | N/A | 50% | 10% | 10% | 30% (10% committee + 20% live-vote) |
| June 8, 2013 – June 14, 2014 | N/A | 60% | 10% | 10% | 20% (10% committee + 10% live-vote) |
| June 21, 2014 – November 14, 2015 | N/A | 50% | 10% | 10% | 30% (15% committee + 15% live-vote) |
| April 22, 2017 – August 17, 2019 | 5% (MBC radio) | 50% | 10% | 10% | 25% (10% committee + 15% live-vote) |
| August 24, 2019 – March 14, 2020 | 5% (MBC radio) | 60% (50% gaon + 10% Vibe*) | 10% | 10% | 25% (10% committee + 15% live-vote) |
| March 21, 2020 – July 18, 2020 | 5% (MBC radio) | 60% (50% gaon + 10% Vibe*) | 10% | 10% | 35% (10% committee + 10% pre-vote* + 15% live-vote) |
| July 25, 2020 – September 19, 2020 | 5% (MBC radio) | 50% | 10% | 10% | 35% (10% committee + 10% pre-vote* + 15% live-vote) |
| September 26, 2020 – February 20, 2021 | 5% (MBC radio) | 60% (50% gaon + 10% FLO*) | 10% | 10% | 35% (10% committee + 10% pre-vote* + 15% live-vote) |
| February 27, 2021 – May 8, 2021 | 10% (MBC TV + Radio) | 60% (50% gaon + 10% FLO*) | 10% | 15% | 25% (5% committee + 10% pre-vote + 10% live-vote) |
| May 8, 2021 – May 29, 2021 | 10% (MBC TV + Radio) | 50% | 10% | 15% | 25% (5% committee + 10% pre-vote + 10% live-vote) |
| June 5, 2021 – October 8, 2022 | 10% (MBC TV + Radio) | 50% | 10% | 10% | 20% (5% committee + 5% pre-vote + 10% live-vote) |
| October 22, 2022 – present | 10% (MBC TV + Radio) | 60% | 10% | 10% | 20% (5% committee + 5% pre-vote + 10% live-vote) |

Asterisk (*) indicates the criteria that are for first-place nominees only.

Based source and explanations for each criterion, in alphabetical order:

- Broadcast: MBC radio (April 22, 2017 - now) + TV (February 27, 2021 - now).
- Digital sales: Numbers of download, streaming based on Gaon digital chart. During the time that Vibe and FLO sponsor Music Core, this also include Vibe and FLO respectively as a separate criterion and that criterion is for first-place nominees only
- Live-vote: Voting during the show. Currently via text message + Mubeat app (June 5, 2021 - now). Always for 1st place nominees only.
- Physical sales: Number of copies, based on Gaon album chart
- Pre-vote: Mubeat app. Before February 27, 2021; this criterion is only for 1st place nominees only. This is held from Tuesday to Thursday (mean 4 days prior to 2 days prior; before February 27, 2021 is Tuesday to Friday, which mean 4 days prior to a day prior).
- Video views or SNS: YouTube views, only count from official MV.
- Viewer committee: A survey via official Music Core website, 2000 MBC accounts will be randomly chosen to be part of viewer committee voting. This is held from Wednesday to Thursday.

The Top 50 songs of the week are featured on the show, where the Top 30–11 songs are shown via two marquee (one is for 30-21 and another is for 20-11) in the last of two different stages and the Top 10–4 songs are featured by the hosts. The hosts then showcase the Top three songs and announce who will be the winner of the week. The Number 1 song on the chart is the winner of that week's chart and receives an award. Every songs that have been released no more than two months and not got quintuple crown (i. e: 5 wins in this show) yet are eligible on chart. However, OST, songs released through audition program and deemed unsuitable (at MBC's discretion) is not eligible. For top 50 songs of the week (full chart), it will be posted on music show's official website every Monday/Tuesday/Wednesday of the following week.

From May 20, 2017, to February 20, 2021, the rule was every song that is not released no more than three months is eligible. Before May 20, 2017; every songs, regardless of when it release or number of time get the first place, are eligible.

== List of winners ==
=== 2005 ===
List of first place winners

| Date | Artist | Song |
|---|---|---|
| October 29 | Epik High | "Fly" |
| November 5 | Epik High | "Fly" |
| November 12 | Epik High | "Fly" |
| November 19 | g.o.d. | "2 Love" |
| November 26 | g.o.d. | "2 Love" |
| December 3 | g.o.d. | "2 Love" |
| December 10 | g.o.d. | "2 Love" |
| December 17 | Tei | "Screaming I Miss You" |
| December 24 | MC the Max | "Love is Supposed to Hurt" |
| December 31 | MC the Max | "Love is Supposed to Hurt" |

=== 2013 ===
List of first place winners

| Date | Artist | Song | Points |
|---|---|---|---|
| April 20 | Infinite | "Man in Love" | 7,587 |
| April 27 | Psy | "Gentleman" | 6,847 |
| May 4 | Cho Yong-pil | "Bounce" | 7,698 |
| May 11 | Roy Kim | "Spring Spring Spring" | 8,333 |
| May 18 | B1A4 | "What's Going On?" | 8,479 |
| May 25 | Shinhwa | "This Love" | 7,634 |
| June 1 | Shinhwa | "This Love" | 8,540 |
| June 8 | Beast | "Will You Be Okay?" | 7,348 |
| June 15 | Exo | "Wolf" | 6,392 |
| June 22 | Sistar | "Give It To Me" | 7,717 |
| June 29 | Sistar | "Give It To Me" | 8,473 |
| July 6 | Roy Kim | "Love Love Love" | 8,270 |
| July 13 | Dynamic Duo | "BAAAM" | 7,885 |
| July 20 | 2NE1 | "Falling In Love" | 7,691 |
| July 27 | Infinite | "Destiny" | 9,770 |
| August 3 | Beast | "Shadow" | 8,368 |
| August 10 | Music Core Summer Special – No Chart | | |
| August 17 | Music Core 2013 Korea Music Festival in Sokcho – No Chart | | |
| August 24 | Exo | "Growl" | 8,666 |
| August 31 | Exo | "Growl" | 8,074 |
| September 7 | Exo | "Growl" | 6,925 |
| September 14 | Music Core Pre-record Show – No Chart | | |
| September 21 | Music Core K-POP Festival – No Chart | | |
| September 28 | Soyou & Mad Clown | "Stupid In Love" | 6,364 |
| October 5 | Busker Busker | "Love, at first" | 8,219 |
| October 12 | Busker Busker | "Love, at first" | 7,493 |
| October 19 | IU | "The Red Shoes" | 9,846 |
| October 26 | Shinee | "Everybody" | 9,641 |
| November 2 | K.Will | "You Don't Know Love" | 7,647 |
| November 9 | Trouble Maker | "Now" | 8,450 |
| November 16 | Music Core Pre-record Show – No Chart | | |
| November 23 | Davichi | "The Letter" | 6,614 |
| November 30 | 2NE1 | "Missing You" | 8,454 |
| December 7 | Hyolyn | "One Way Love" | 7,295 |
| December 14 | Exo | "Miracles in December" | 7,458 |
| December 21 | Exo | "Miracles in December" | 9,032 |
| December 28 | Music Core Year End Chart Special – No Chart | | |

=== 2014 ===
List of first place winners

| Date | Artist | Song | Points |
|---|---|---|---|
| January 4 | IU | "Friday" | 7,802 |
| January 11 | Girl's Day | "Something" | 6,748 |
| January 18 | TVXQ | "Something" | 7,753 |
| January 25 | B1A4 | "Lonely" | 7,311 |
| February 1 | Music Core Pre-record Show – No Chart | | |
| February 8 | B1A4 | "Lonely" | 7,162 |
| February 15 | B.A.P | "1004 (Angel)" | 8,575 |
| February 22 | Soyou & Junggigo | "Some" | 7,158 |
| March 1 | Soyou & Junggigo | "Some" | 7,259 |
| March 8 | Music Core 400th Episode Special | | |
| March 8 | TVXQ | "Spellbound" | 9,050 |
| March 15 | Girls' Generation | "Mr.Mr." | 8,303 |
| March 22 | Girls' Generation | "Mr.Mr." | 7,537 |
| March 29 | No Chart | | |
| April 5 | Park Hyo-shin | "Wild Flower" | 7,576 |
| April 12 | Apink | "Mr. Chu" | 9,447 |
| April 19 | AKMU | "200%" | 7,446 |
| April 26 | AKMU | "200%" | 7,965 |
| May 3 | AKMU | "200%" | 8,490 |
| May 10 | AKMU | "200%" | 8,754 |
| May 17 | Exo-K | "Overdose" | 9,257 |
| May 24 | Exo-K | "Overdose" | 7,633 |
| May 31 | Fly to the Sky | "You You You" | 6,784 |
| June 7 | Gary & Jungin | "Your Scent" | 6,201 |
| June 14 | Taeyang | "Eyes, Nose, Lips" | 7,518 |
| June 21 | Beast | "No More" | 8,330 |
| June 28 | Beast | "Good Luck" | 10,000 |
| July 5 | Beast | "Good Luck" | 7,777 |
| July 12 | Beast | "Good Luck" | 7,274 |
| July 19 | f(x) | "Red Light" | 9,074 |
| July 26 | Girl's Day | "Darling" | 7,344 |
| August 2 | Infinite | "Back" | 7,154 |
| August 9 | Sistar | "Touch My Body" | 9,151 |
| August 16 | Sistar | "Touch My Body" | 8,360 |
| August 23 | Block B | "H.E.R" | 8,239 |
| August 30 | Taemin | "Danger" | 7,368 |
| September 6 | Sistar | "I Swear" | 6,532 |
| September 13 | Super Junior | "Mamacita" | 6,993 |
| September 20 | Super Junior | "Mamacita" | 6,035 |
| September 27 | No Chart | | |
| October 4 | No Chart | | |
| October 11 | Girls' Generation-TTS | "Holler" | 8,220 |
| October 18 | Roy Kim | "Home" | 8,527 |
| October 25 | No Chart | | |
| November 1 | Beast | "12:30" | 9,197 |
| November 8 | Beast | "12:30" | 8,555 |
| November 15 | MC Mong | "Miss Me Or Diss Me" | 7,353 |
| November 22 | Kyuhyun | "At Gwanghwamun" | 7,455 |
| November 29 | Toy | "Three of Us" | 6,832 |
| December 6 | Apink | "Luv" | 9,237 |
| December 13 | Apink | "Luv" | 7,822 |
| December 20 | Apink | "Luv" | 7,185 |
| December 27 | No Chart | | |

=== 2015 – present ===
- 2015
- 2016
- 2017
- 2018
- 2019
- 2020
- 2021
- 2022
- 2023
- 2024
- 2025
- 2026

== Achievements by artists ==
List of most No. 1 winners

| Rank | Artist | Count |
|---|---|---|
| 1st | BTS | 43 |
| 2nd | IU | 24 |
| 3rd | Exo | 22 |
| 4th | Wanna One | 12 |
| 4th | (G)I-dle | 12 |
| 4th | Red Velvet | 12 |
| 4th | Ive | 12 |
| 8th | Twice | 11 |
| 8th | Beast/Highlight | 11 |
| 8th | Blackpink | 11 |
| 11th | Apink | 10 |
| 11th | Taeyeon | 10 |
| 13th | Lim Young-woong | 9 |
| 13th | NewJeans | 9 |
| 15th | BigBang | 8 |
| 15th | NCT 127 | 8 |

List of longest consecutive No. 1 songs

| Rank | Artist | Song | Count | Year |
|---|---|---|---|---|
| 1st | BTS | "Dynamite" | 10 times | 2020 |
| 2nd | BTS | "Boy With Luv" | 9 times | 2019 |
| 3rd | BTS | "Life Goes On" | 6 times | 2020 – 2021 |
| 4th | Apink | "Luv" | 5 times | 2014 – 2015 |
| 4th | BTS | "On" | 5 times | 2020 |
| 4th | BTS | "Butter" | 5 times | 2021 |
| 4th | IU | "Strawberry Moon" | 5 times | 2021 |
| 4th | (G)I-dle | "Queencard" | 5 times | 2023 |
| 9th | g.o.d | "2 Love" | 4 times | 2005 |
| 9th | AKMU | "200%" | 4 times | 2014 |
| 9th | Exo | "Call Me Baby" | 4 times | 2015 |
| 9th | Wanna One | "Beautiful" | 4 times | 2017 |
| 9th | Blackpink | "Ddu-Du Ddu-Du" | 4 times | 2018 |
| 9th | Zico | "Any Song" | 4 times | 2020 |
| 9th | Ive | "Eleven" | 4 times | 2021 – 2022 |
| 9th | Taeyeon | "INVU" | 4 times | 2022 |
| 9th | Ive | "After Like" | 4 times | 2022 |
| 9th | NewJeans | "Ditto" | 4 times | 2023 |
| 9th | Jungkook | "Seven" | 4 times | 2023 |
| 20th | Epik High | "Fly" | 3 times | 2005 |
| 20th | Exo | "Growl" | 3 times | 2013 |
| 20th | Beast | "Good Luck" | 3 times | 2014 |
| 20th | Exo | "Love Me Right" | 3 times | 2015 |
| 20th | CNCO | "Reggaetón Lento (Bailemos)" | 3 times | 2016 |
| 20th | Elenco de Soy Luna (Karol Sevilla, Ruggero Pasquarelli, Michael Ronda, Valentina Zenere, Carolina Kopelioff, Agustín Bernasconi, Gastón Vietto, Katja Martínez, Malena Ratner, Jorge López, Ana Jara, Lionel Ferro & Chiara Parravicini) | "Alas (Radio Disney Vivo)" | 3 times | 2016 |
| 20th | Wanna One | "Energetic" | 3 times | 2017 |
| 20th | iKon | "Love Scenario" | 3 times | 2018 |
| 20th | BTS | "Fake Love" | 3 times | 2018 |
| 20th | Twice | "Dance the Night Away" | 3 times | 2018 |
| 20th | IU | "Bbibbi" | 3 times | 2018 |
| 20th | Itzy | "Icy" | 3 times | 2019 |
| 20th | Red Velvet | "Psycho" | 3 times | 2020 |
| 20th | Blackpink | "How You Like That" | 3 times | 2020 |
| 20th | Red Velvet | "Queendom" | 3 times | 2021 |
| 20th | BigBang | "Still Life" | 3 times | 2022 |
| 20th | Le Sserafim | "Antifragile" | 3 times | 2022 |
| 20th | (G)I-dle | "Queencard" | 3 times | 2023 |
| 20th | Taeyeon | "To. X" | 3 times | 2024 |
| 20th | IU | "Love Wins All" | 3 times | 2024 |
| 20th | Illit | "Magnetic" | 3 times | 2024 |
| 20th | NewJeans | "How Sweet" | 3 times | 2024 |
| 20th | Lee Young-ji | "Small Girl" | 3 times | 2024 |
| 20th | Day6 | "Melt Down" | 3 times | 2024 |
| 20th | Rosé and Bruno Mars | "APT." | 3 times | 2024 |
| 20th | G-Dragon | "Home Sweet Home" | 3 times | 2024-2025 |
| 20th | Ive | "Rebel Heart" | 3 times | 2025 |
| 20th | G-Dragon | "Too Bad" | 3 times | 2025 |
| 20th | Blackpink | "Jump" | 3 times | 2025 |
| 20th | Aespa | "Rich Man" | 3 times | 2025 |
| 20th | Nmixx | "Blue Valentine" | 3 times | 2025 |
| 20th | BTS | "Swim" | 3 times | 2026 |

Top 10 Highest Scores (1st – 3rd system)

| Rank | Artist | Song | Score | Date |
|---|---|---|---|---|
| 1st | IU | "The Red Shoes" | 9,846 | October 19, 2013 |
| 2nd | Infinite | "Destiny" | 9,770 | July 23, 2013 |
| 3rd | Shinee | "Everybody" | 9,641 | October 26, 2013 |
| 4th | Apink | "Mr. Chu" | 9,447 | April 12, 2014 |
| 5th | Exo-K | "Overdose" | 9,257 | May 17, 2014 |
| 6th | Exo | "Miracles in December" | 9,032 | December 21, 2013 |
| 7th | Exo | "Growl" | 8,666 | August 24, 2013 |
| 8th | Shinhwa | "This Love" | 8,540 | June 1, 2013 |
| 9th | B1A4 | "What's Going On?" | 8,479 | May 18, 2013 |
| 10th | Sistar | "Give It To Me" | 8,473 | June 29, 2013 |

Top 10 Highest Scores (4th system)

| Rank | Artist | Song | Score | Date |
|---|---|---|---|---|
| 1st | Beast | "Good Luck" | 10,000 | June 28, 2014 |
| 2nd | Girls' Generation | "Lion Heart" | 9,699 | September 19, 2015 |
| 3rd | Exo | "Love Me Right" | 9,666 | June 13, 2015 |
| 4th | Girls' Generation | "Party" | 9,660 | July 18, 2015 |
| 5th | Exo | "Love Me Right" | 9,562 | June 20, 2015 |
| 6th | BigBang | "Let's Not Fall in Love" | 9,472 | August 22, 2015 |
| 7th | Shinee | "View" | 9,251 | June 6, 2015 |
| 8th | Apink | "Luv" | 9,237 | December 6, 2014 |
| 9th | Beast | "12:30" | 9,197 | November 1, 2014 |
| 10th | VIXX | "Love Equation" | 9,094 | March 7, 2015 |

Top 10 Highest Scores (5th system)

| Rank | Artist | Song | Score | Date |
|---|---|---|---|---|
| 1st | BTS | "Fake Love" | 10,000 | June 2, 2018 |
| 1st | BTS | "Boy with Luv" | 10,000 | April 27, 2019 |
| 2nd | Twice | "Heart Shaker" | 9,929 | December 23, 2017 |
| 3rd | Twice | "Dance the Night Away" | 9,792 | July 21, 2018 |
| 4th | Wanna One | "Energetic" | 9,703 | August 19, 2017 |
| 5th | Red Velvet | "Red Flavor" | 9,427 | July 22, 2017 |
| 6th | Red Velvet | "Power Up" | 9,387 | August 18, 2018 |
| 7th | Exo | "Ko Ko Bop" | 9,316 | August 5, 2017 |
| 8th | Wanna One | "Boomerang" | 9,289 | March 31, 2018 |
| 9th | Exo | "Ko Ko Bop" | 9,266 | August 12, 2017 |
| 10th | Winner | "Everyday" | 9,112 | April 14, 2018 |

Top 10 Highest Scores (6th system)

| Rank | Artist | Song | Score | Date |
|---|---|---|---|---|
| 1st | Red Velvet | "Psycho" | 10,895 | January 4, 2020 |
| 2nd | BTS | "On" | 10,518 | March 7, 2020 |
| 3rd | Taeyeon | "Spark" | 9,740 | November 9, 2019 |
| 4th | Red Velvet | "Psycho" | 9,398 | January 11, 2020 |
| 5th | IU | "Love Poem" | 8,830 | November 16, 2019 |
| 6th | AKMU | "How Can I Love the Heartbreak, You're the One I Love" | 8,390 | October 26, 2019 |
| 7th | BTS | "On" | 8,288 | February 29, 2020 |
| 8th | Zico | "Any Song" | 8,267 | February 1, 2020 |
| 9th | Exo | "Obsession" | 8,194 | December 7, 2019 |
| 10th | Red Velvet | "Psycho" | 8,047 | January 18, 2020 |

Top 10 Highest Scores (7th – 9th system)

| Rank | Artist | Song | Score | Date |
|---|---|---|---|---|
| 1st | BTS | "Life Goes On" | 11,881 | December 5, 2020 |
| 2nd | BTS | "Life Goes On" | 10,981 | December 12, 2020 |
| 3rd | Twice | "More & More" | 10,871 | June 13, 2020 |
| 4th | Apink | "Dumhdurum" | 10,780 | April 25, 2020 |
| 5th | BTS | "Life Goes On" | 10,656 | November 28, 2020 |
| 6th | BTS | "Dynamite" | 10,602 | September 26, 2020 |
| 7th | Blackpink | "How You Like That" | 10,464 | July 11, 2020 |
| 8th | BTS | "Dynamite" | 10,319 | October 10, 2020 |
| 9th | IU | "Celebrity" | 10,204 | February 6, 2021 |
| 10th | Apink | "Dumhdurum" | 10,147 | May 2, 2020 |

Top 10 Highest Scores (10th – 11th system)

| Rank | Artist | Song | Score | Date |
|---|---|---|---|---|
| 1st | Kang Daniel | "Antidote" | 10,702 | April 24, 2021 |
| 2nd | Kang Daniel | "Paranoia" | 10,323 | February 27, 2021 |
| 3rd | NCT Dream | "Hot Sauce" | 10,000 | May 22, 2021 |
| 4th | Shinee | "Don't Call Me" | 9,546 | March 6, 2021 |
| 5th | NU'EST | "Inside Out" | 8,800 | May 1, 2021 |
| 6th | Rosé | "On the Ground" | 8,394 | March 27, 2021 |
| 7th | BTS | "Butter" | 8,344 | May 29, 2021 |
| 8th | Lim Young-woong | "My Starry Love" | 8,292 | March 20, 2021 |
| 9th | Highlight | "Not The End" | 7,504 | May 15, 2021 |
| 10th | IU | "Lilac" | 6,949 | May 8, 2021 |

Top 10 Highest Scores (12th system)

| Rank | Artist | Song | Score | Date |
|---|---|---|---|---|
| 1st | NCT Dream | "Beatbox" | 9,800 | June 11, 2022 |
| 2nd | Ive | "I Am" | 9,668 | April 22, 2023 |
| 3rd | Plave | "Dash" | 9,571 | February 15, 2025 |
| 4th | NCT Dream | "ISTJ" | 9,420 | July 29, 2023 |
| 5th | The Boyz | "Roar" | 9,401 | March 4, 2023 |
| 6th | NCT Dream | "Glitch Mode" | 9,300 | April 9, 2022 |
| 7th | Seventeen | "Maestro" | 9,278 | May 11, 2024 |
| 8th | Shinee | "Hard" | 9,196 | July 8, 2023 |
| 9th | Ive | "After Like" | 9,191 | September 3, 2022 |
| 10th | Aespa | "Savage" | 9,099 | October 16, 2021 |

Top 10 Highest Scores (all time)

| Rank | Artist | Song | Score | Date |
|---|---|---|---|---|
| 1st | BTS | "Life Goes On" | 11,881 | December 5, 2020 |
| 2nd | BTS | "Life Goes On" | 10,981 | December 12, 2020 |
| 3rd | Red Velvet | "Psycho" | 10,895 | January 4, 2020 |
| 4th | Twice | "More & More" | 10,871 | June 13, 2020 |
| 5th | Apink | "Dumhdurum" | 10,780 | April 25, 2020 |
| 6th | Kang Daniel | "Antidote" | 10,702 | April 24, 2021 |
| 7th | BTS | "Life Goes On" | 10,656 | November 28, 2020 |
| 8th | BTS | "Dynamite" | 10,602 | September 26, 2020 |
| 9th | BTS | "On" | 10,518 | March 7, 2020 |
| 10th | Blackpink | "How You Like That" | 10,464 | July 11, 2020 |

== Quintuple Crown ==
Starting from February 27, 2021, Show! Music Core implemented the Quintuple Crown, which is a song that has received first place five times. After that, the song is removed from the chart and ineligible to win again.

List of Quintuple Crowns

| Artist | Song | Wins |
|---|---|---|
2021
| BTS | "Butter" | May 29, June 5, June 12, June 19, June 26 |
| IU | "Strawberry Moon" | October 30, November 20, November 27, December 4, December 11 |
2023
| (G)I-dle | "Queencard" | May 27, June 3, June 10, June 24, July 1 |

== Triple Crown ==
Starting from April 13, 2024, Show! Music Core implemented the Triple Crown, which is a song that has received first place three times. After that, the song is removed from the chart and ineligible to win again.

List of Triple Crowns

| Artist | Song | Wins | Ref. |
|---|---|---|---|
2024
| Illit | "Magnetic" | April 13, April 20, April 27 | |
| NewJeans | "How Sweet" | June 8, June 15, June 22 | |
| Lee Young-ji | "Small Girl" | July 6, July 13, July 20 | |
| Day6 | "Melt Down" | September 14, September 21, September 28 | |
| Rosé & Bruno Mars | "Apt." | November 2, November 9, November 16 | |
2025
| G-Dragon | "Home Sweet Home" | December 21, January 11, January 18 | |
| Ive | "Rebel Heart" | January 25, February 8, February 22 | |
| G-Dragon | "Too Bad" | March 8, March 15, March 29 | |
| Blackpink | "Jump" | August 2, August 16, August 23 | |
| Aespa | "Rich Man" | September 20, September 27, October 4 | |
| Nmixx | "Blue Valentine" | October 25, November 15, November 22 | |
2026
| BTS | "Swim" | April 4, April 11, April 18 | |
| Cortis | "RedRed" | May 16, May 23, May 30 | |
| I.O.I | "Suddenly" | June 13, June 27, July 4 | |

== Controversy ==
On 20 April 2013, MBC introduced a brand new ranking system for Show! Music Core, and as such had nominated INFINITE, K.Will, Davichi, and Lee Hi for the first place award. Singer K.Will was mistakenly announced as the winner. He looked confused, and was about to say thanks when the Show! Music Core staff quickly informed everyone on stage that there had been a mistake and that INFINITE was the actual winner. K.Will laughed it off and said: "It's okay, I'm okay." He shouted, "I love INFINITE!" The INFINITE members looked unsure about accepting the trophy.

Afterwards, the staff of the show was highly criticized by viewers. The staff made a statement on their official board and said,

This is the 'Show! Music Core' staff. There was a mistake in announcing the 1st-place winner on the 20 April broadcast. This was a mistake because the text votes were mixed up for the two 1st place nominees. The two team's scores are 100% fair results. The text votes accumulation company has promised to work harder to keep this from happening again. Please excuse us for not running a smooth live broadcast. Thank you.

== Similar programs ==
- SBS Inkigayo
- KBS Music Bank
- Mnet M Countdown
- Arirang TV Simply K-Pop (formerly called The M-Wave and Wave K)
- Arirang TV Show K-Pop
- JTBC Music Universe K-909
- MBC M Show Champion
- SBS M The Show

== See also ==
- Music programs of South Korea
- MBC Gayo Daejejeon
