= Zico (rapper) =

South Korean rapper (born 1992)

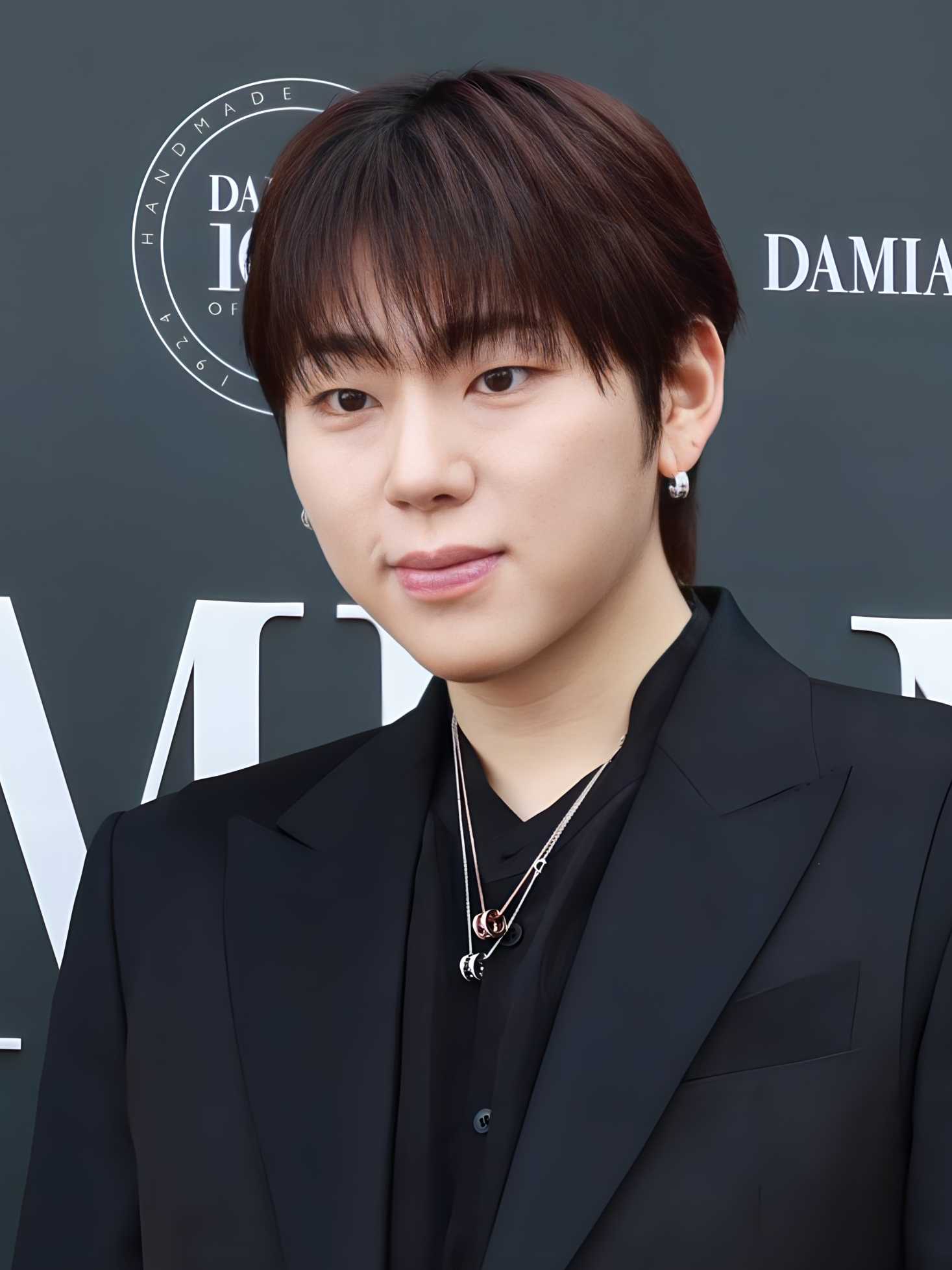
- Zico in May 2024

Background information
- Born: Woo Ji-ho; September 14, 1992 (age 34); Seoul, South Korea
- Genres: K-pop; hip hop
- Occupations: Rapper; record producer; singer-songwriter
- Years active: 2011–present
- Labels: Stardom; Seven Seasons; KOZ
- Member of: Block B; Fanxy Child
- Website: kozofficial.com

Korean name
- Hangul: 우지호
- Hanja: 禹智皓
- RR: U Jiho
- MR: U Chiho

Woo Ji-ho (Korean: 우지호; born September 14, 1992), known professionally as Zico (지코), is a South Korean rapper, record producer, and singer-songwriter. He debuted as the leader of the boy band Block B in 2011 and made his first solo release in 2014.

Zico is notable for his crossover skills within the Korean hip hop scene, maintaining an underground reputation along with mainstream appeal as a Korean idol. He is a record producer of both K-pop and Korean hip hop music. He is also part of the crew Fanxy Child, which he formed in 2016. In 2019, he released his first full-length solo album, Thinking. Zico's 2020 single "Any Song" spent seven weeks atop the Circle Digital Chart, becoming the longest-running number-one song in history at the time. In 2024, he achieved his first number-one hit on the US Billboard World Digital Song Sales chart and his first top-ten entry on the Billboard Global Excl. U.S. chart with the single "Spot!" featuring Jennie.

== Early life and career beginnings ==
Zico was born in Dohwa, Seoul on September 14, 1992. He was a Vocal Performance major at Seoul Music High School. In the lyrics of his song "Release", he mentions that he spent a year studying abroad in both Canada and China, as well as three years in Japan. Meanwhile, he had referred to his time in Japan within his song "Osaka" with fellow Korean musician ELO.

He began his musical career as an underground rapper, going by the name "Nacseo" (낙서), meaning 'doodle' or 'scribble' in Korean. He promoted as Nacseo in the Japanese underground hip hop scene alongside the crews "Dope Squad" and "Undisputed". He auditioned for SM Entertainment as a teenager.

In 2009, he officially debuted in a duo with Park Kyung named 'Harmonics' in Korea with the digital single "The Letter". He joined Stardom Entertainment in 2009. He featured in IU's song "Marshmallow" as well as Cho PD's "Expectations for K-Hip Hop" and Jung Seul-gi's "Outsiders".

In 2010, he released his first mixtape called, Zico on the Block. The mixtape was well received by the Korean hip hop scene.

== Career ==
=== 2011–2012: Block B and solo appearances ===
Zico debuted as the leader of Block B on April 15, 2011, with their first promotional single "Freeze". Zico had produced their debut mini-album Welcome to the Block. The Korean Ministry of Gender Equality and Family and public broadcast channel KBS banned the songs "LOL" and "Did You or Did You Not" from minors. When asked about the banning, he said:

"It's not that we don't consider the regulations when we're producing the songs, but I did often think that our freedom of expression was being interrupted. Still, I do acknowledge that as a producer that creates songs meant for the public, it was a shortcoming of mine to not have paid more attention to the regulations."

— Zico, Welcome to the Block Showcase Q&A

That year he featured in Hyuna's debut mini-album Bubble Pop! on the track "Just Follow". He promoted with her on Korean music shows from July to August. He attended the 2011 MTV EMAs in Belfast, Northern Ireland as part of Block B and on November 27 began hosting the SBS-MTV interactive radio show "Studio C!" with rap duo Mighty Mouth. Zico made an appearance at Swings' It's My Year II concert, performing "I'm Still Fly" and "Cocks".

In 2012, he appeared on stage featuring in girl group Wink's song "Stay in Shanghai" on Inkigayo on February 19. He also performed at the All Force One hip hop festival on July 21, alongside Dok2 and Beenzino. On October 24, he began co-hosting SBS-MTV's The Show with Block B member P.O. At the 2012 Mnet Asian Music Awards he participated in a hip hop collaboration called "Beats Rocks The World" with artists including Loco, Double K, Davichi, and Dynamic Duo. In October, he produced and released a second mixtape, Zico on the Block 1.5. In December, he co-produced D-Unit's third mini-album. That year, he also entered Dong-ah Institute of Media and Arts as a Drama major.

=== 2013–2014: Solo debut and producing career ===
Zico performed at Phantom's concert on May 17 and at the ONE Hiphop Festival on September 7. In August, Zico was dissed in Deepflow's response to Swings' "King Swings", a diss track over the instrumental from "Control". In it, Deepflow accused Zico and Jay Park of only being in hip hop for the money. Later, rapper Aphelia created a diss track called "Zicontrol", specifically speaking of his frustration with Zico's guaranteed popularity as an idol compared to the difficulty of being a hip hop artist alone. Dead'P, in the track "Rap Game Control", also expressed frustration over idols portraying themselves as "hip hop" and the integration of mainstream K-pop culture into the underground hiphop scene. On October 18, Zico and fellow Block B member P.O walked during Seoul Fashion Week for the brand Dominic's Way by designer Song Hye-myung (송혜명). In November, Zico was featured in IZE magazine, and publicly tweeted about how the intrusion of sasaeng fans into his life forced him to constantly change his phone number to avoid their communications. He performed at the SBS Gayo Daejeon 2013 as part of a collaborative hip-hop stage featuring MFBTY, B.A.P.'s Bang Yongguk, and Eun Jiwon.

In late May 2014, following the Sewol Ferry Disaster, Zico attended the funeral of a fan who had died in the incident and dedicated a rap to her at Block B's 2014 Blockbuster Concert. In June, T-ara's Hyomin released the Brave Brothers-produced mini-album Make Up, which allegedly plagiarized lyrics from Zico's various mixtapes and previous releases. She denied the allegations, saying that the lyrics in question were in homage and that she had permission from Zico to use them. However, she did not credit him as a songwriter on the release. In July, Zico appeared as a host on the music program Show! Music Core. He also appeared in the second season of the television show Fashion King Korea, along with fellow Block B member P.O. He was a headliner at the 2014 Freestyle Day concert held on August 2 at Uniqlo Ax. He also participated on a special stage with Dynamic Duo for the M! Countdown 10th Anniversary Special, performing the song "Friday Night". On September 9, he produced the music for Go Tae Yong's S/S15 show at New York Fashion Week and further collaborated with him for Seoul Fashion Week. Zico headlined The Hiphop Festa with Dok2, The Quiett, and Simon D on October 4. He also performed at the Hiphopplaya Show Weekend, a Korean hip hop festival at the Itaewon Blue Square on October 31. Zico presented the 2014 Asia Song Festival along with Super Junior's Leeteuk and Girl's Day's Minah. He also performed a collaborative stage at that festival with Beast's Hyunseung.

On November 7, Zico released his official solo debut single entitled "Tough Cookie" featuring the rapper Don Mills. He was criticized for wearing a jacket emblazoned with an American Confederate flag in the single's accompanying music video and the use of the homophobic slur "faggot" in the song's lyrics. Zico's label officially addressed the issue saying the homophobic implication of the term had been unintended and that Zico held no prejudice towards sexual minorities. He performed a collaborative stage with Seo Taiji for the 2014 Mnet Asian Music Awards, performing the Seo Taiji and Boys' song "Come Back Home".

=== 2015–2016: Gallery and various singles ===
On February 13, 2015, Zico released "Well Done", his second single, featuring Ja Mezz. In March, he provided the soundtrack for Beyond Closet's 2015 S/S runway at New York Fashion Week. He also graduated from the Dong-Ah Institute of Media and Arts with a bachelor's degree. February 2015 also saw Zico join the cast of the female rap competition show Unpretty Rapstar for the second episode, as a producer. He produced the song "Up All Night" for contestant Yuk Ji-dam; the song's chorus then became a part of the "Say It! Yes or No" skit on the Korean sketch-comedy show Gag Concert. In May 2015, it was announced that Zico would be appear for the entire season of Show Me the Money 4 as a producer with Paloalto of Hi-Lite Records. After a car Zico was riding in crashed July 8 because the manager driving it was drunk, Show Me the Money said it was considering removing him as producer. Zico was cleared of responsibility for the crash by police, however, and the show kept him on. He produced the song "Turtle Ship" for the show, and it was followed by "Moneyflow", which was released on August 7, and "Fear", which was released on August 21.

In October, Zico released his own version of "Up All Night" titled "Say Yes or No", featuring the rappers Penomeco and The Quiett. He also featured on "Traveler", the seventh track of f(x)'s fourth album 4 Walls. His single "Boys and Girls" was released on November 3, and was the number one song on the Gaon Digital Chart for all of November. In November, he released his first solo EP, Gallery, with title track "Eureka". On January 25, 2016, Zico released two songs, "It Was Love", featuring Luna from f(x), and "I Am You, You Are Me". In mid-November 2016, Jellyfish Entertainment announced that Gugudan's Kim Se-jeong would release a song produced by Zico. The song, "Flower Road", was created by Zico during an episode of the variety show Talents for Sale. The song topped numerous Korean real-time digital charts when it was released on November 23, 2016, and it was nominated for a 2017 Melon Music Awards Hot Trend Award. Later that month, it was announced that Zico, Crush, and Dean would collaborate on a single called "Bermuda Triangle", released November 28. The song also hit number one on various Korean real-time digital charts upon its release. In addition, Zico, Crush, and Dean performed at the 2016 Mnet Asian Music Awards on December 2, where Zico won Best Male Artist.

=== 2017–2018: Television and departure from Seven Seasons ===
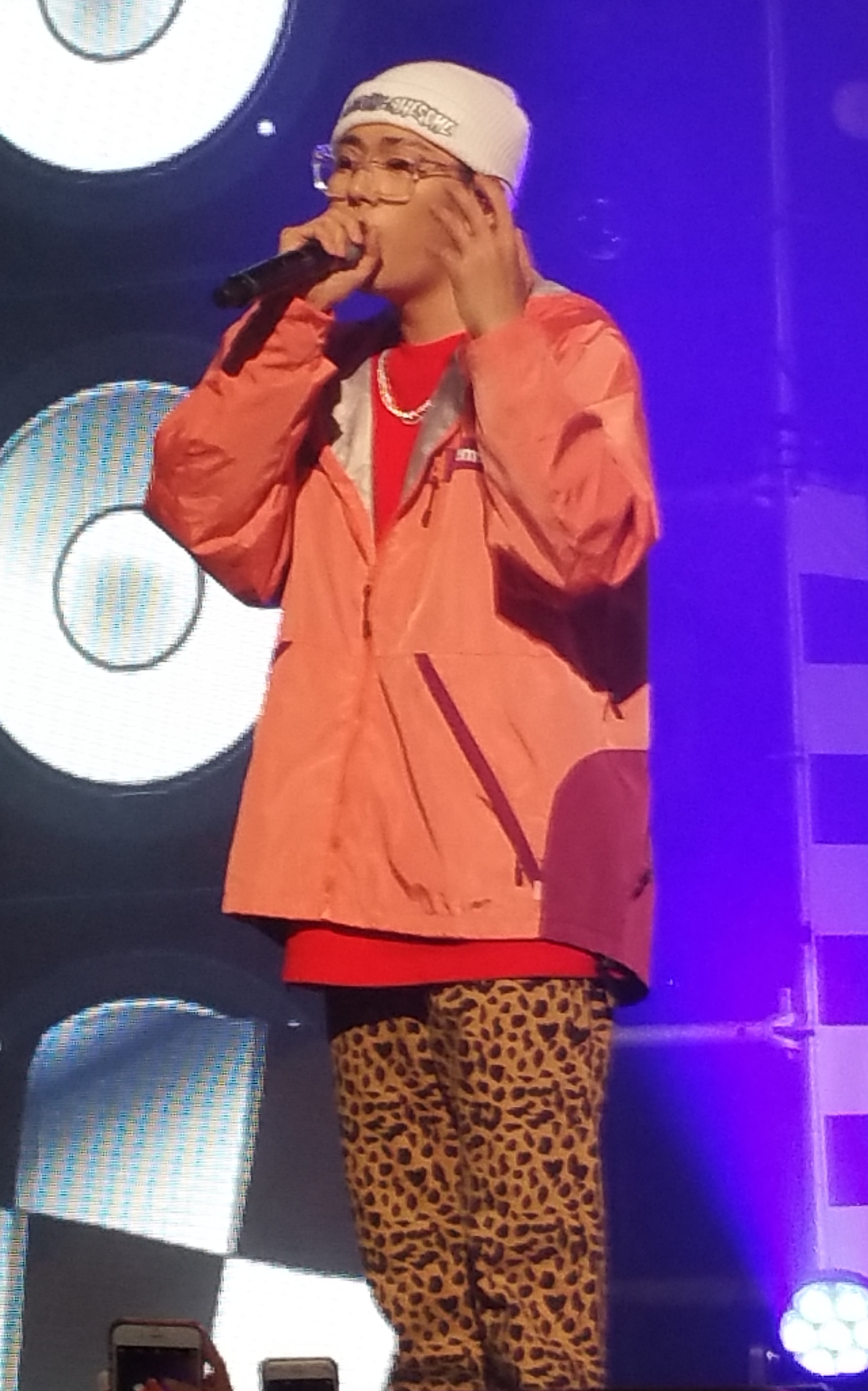
Zico in 2017

In January 2017, Zico performed in London as part of a collaboration with the fashion label MISBHV for London's Fashion Week. Zico released the digital single "She's a Baby" on April 13; the song topped seven of Korea's real-time music charts on the day of its release. On May 10, Psy released one of two title tracks, "I Luv It", which Zico co-wrote, from his album 4X2=8. Zico released an album of his own, Television, on July 12, 2017. The album contains two title tracks, "Artist" and "Anti"; "Artist" topped several of the real-time charts on its release. On April 4, it was announced that Zico would join Dean as one of the producing teams for the sixth season of Show Me the Money. The show began airing on June 30; songs produced by Zico and Dean include "Yozm Gang", "Where U At", and "Red Sun". The team's final contestant, Hangzoo from Rhythm Power, won the season, narrowly edging out the rapper Nucksal. Zico's participation in a song on Taeyang's solo album, White Night, was announced August 14. In the spring of 2018, Zico served as a music producer for the MNET show Wanna One Go Season 3: X-CON, creating the song "Kangaroo" for the Wanna One subunit Triple Position.

It was announced on July 3, 2018, that Zico would be releasing a single album at the end of the month that would contain a song featuring the singer IU. Two days later Zico's first solo concert was announced, with two shows, August 11 and 12, at the SK Olympic Handball Gymnasium in Seoul, and an international tour planned for September and October. The Seoul shows sold out almost immediately after tickets went on sale to the public July 16. Two days later, two shows in Tokyo, Japan, were announced for September 1 and 2, 2018. On August 13, concert promoter My Music Taste announced that Zico would be touring Europe from September 26 to October 2, visiting Madrid, London, Berlin, Warsaw, Amsterdam, and Moscow. On August 28 it was announced that Zico would also tour Los Angeles, San Francisco, Chicago, and New York City in the United States in late October. In September 2018, it was announced that Zico would attend the September 2018 inter-Korean summit in Pyongyang, North Korea, as a cultural representative of South Korea. On November 23, 2018, Seven Seasons announced that Zico had not renewed his contract with the label, while the other six members of Block B had. In a statement, Seven Seasons said that it was discussing future group activities with all seven Block B members.

=== 2019–present: KOZ Entertainment, "Any Song" and conscription ===
In January 2019, it was announced that Zico had established his own label, KOZ Entertainment, which he planned to use to develop other artists as well as his own career. On March 2, 2019, it was announced that the mayor of Seoul, Park Won-soon, would appoint Zico as a goodwill representative for the city. In August, the hip-hop crew Fanxy Child, consisting of Zico, Dean, Crush, Penomeco, Millic and Staytuned, held two sold-out concerts in Seoul, coinciding with the release of the crew's single, "Y."

On September 30, 2019, the digital EP Thinking Part.1 was released as the first half of the two-part studio album, titled Thinking. The second half of the studio album Thinking Part.2 was released on November 8, 2019. On January 13, 2020, Zico released his hit single "Any Song". The song initially gained popularity on the video sharing app TikTok with the hashtag "Any Song Challenge"; the challenge has been credited with restoring TikTok's popularity in Korea. "Any Song" was a commercial success in South Korea, debuting at number one on the Gaon Digital Chart, where it spent a total of seven non-consecutive weeks, breaking the record for the most weeks at number one in the Gaon Chart's history. It was certified platinum by the Korea Music Content Association (KMCA) and listed as the most-streamed song in South Korea for the first half of 2020 by the Gaon Chart.

On July 1, Zico released his third EP Random Box, with its title track "Summer Hate" featuring Rain. It was announced on July 21 that Zico would begin the conscription required of South Korean men on July 30, serving as a public service worker. On November 18, 2020, it was announced that HYBE Corporation, formerly Big Hit Entertainment, would acquire Zico's production company KOZ Entertainment, which launched in January 2019. Since April 2021, after the rebranding of KOZ's parent company, HYBE Corporation, the company became part of HYBE Labels, Hybe's entertainment and music production division. KOZ Entertainment, as well as its sister companies, work independently from HYBE while receiving creative support.

In May 2022, a few weeks after completing his public service, Zico announced his return to the SUMMER SONIC 2022 festival in Japan, six years after he last performed there.

In July 2022, it was announced that Zico would be attending the Hip-Hop Playa Festival 2022 taking place September 17–18. On July 27, 2022, Zico released his fourth EP Grown Ass Kid, with its title track "Freak". In November 2022, Zico was named one of GQ Korea's Men of the Year.

On May 30, 2023, the boy group Boy Next Door debuted as KOZ Entertainment’s first idol group, under KOZ Entertainment, a subsidiary of HYBE Labels.

On April 26, 2024, Zico released the single "Spot!" featuring South Korean singer Jennie, which topped the Circle Digital Chart in South Korea. It became his first entry on the Billboard Global 200 at number 24 and on the Global Excl. U.S. at number 8, also becoming his first top ten hit on the latter. In the United States, it debuted at number one on the World Digital Song Sales chart, marking Zico's first-ever number one on any U.S. sales chart. The duo performed their single together live at his Zico Live: Join The Parade concert at Olympic Hall, Seoul on November 24. "Spot!" received accolades including Best Collaboration and Best Rap & Hip Hop Performance at the 2024 MAMA Awards.

In 2025, Zico, Eill, and Verbal featured on Japanese hip-hop group M-Flo's "Eko Eko", and collaborated with Japanese singer-songwriter Lilas Ikuta on "Duet".

== Personal life ==
Zico is a devout Roman Catholic with his baptismal name "John the Apostle" tattooed on his chest, along with a portrait of his mother and below it the phrase "God save Paulus". He also has an older brother, Woo Tae-woon, who was a former member of idol group Speed. Zico studied at the Dong-Ah Institute of Media and Arts University (a technical college specializing in media design, production, and communications) between 2013 – February 13, 2015.

=== Military service ===
Zico began his mandatory military service as a social worker on July 30, 2020. He was discharged on April 29, 2022.

== Discography ==
- Thinking (2019)

=== Other songs and albums ===
- M-Flo's "Superliminal" (song: "Eko Eko") (2026)

== Filmography ==
=== Television shows ===
Year	Title	Role	Notes
2012	The Show	Host	with P.O
2014	Fashion King Korea	Contestant	with P.O
2015	Show Me the Money 4	Judge/Producer	with Paloalto
2016	Celebrity Bromance	Cast Member	with Choi Tae-joon
2017	Show Me the Money 6	Judge/Producer	with Dean
2018	Wanna One Go Season 3: X-CON	Producer	
2019	Produce X 101	Producer	
2020	I-Land	Producer	
2022	Chain Reaction	Host	
2023	No Math School Trip	Cast Member	
2024	The Seasons: Zico's Artist	Host	
2026	Show Me the Money 12	Judge/Producer	with Crush

=== Web shows ===
Year	Title	Role	Notes	Ref.
2022	Saturday Night Live Korea	Host	Season 3 – Episode 4	

=== Radio show ===
Year	Title	Notes
2019	Thinking Bout	Host
