= List of awards and nominations received by IU =

IU awards and nominations
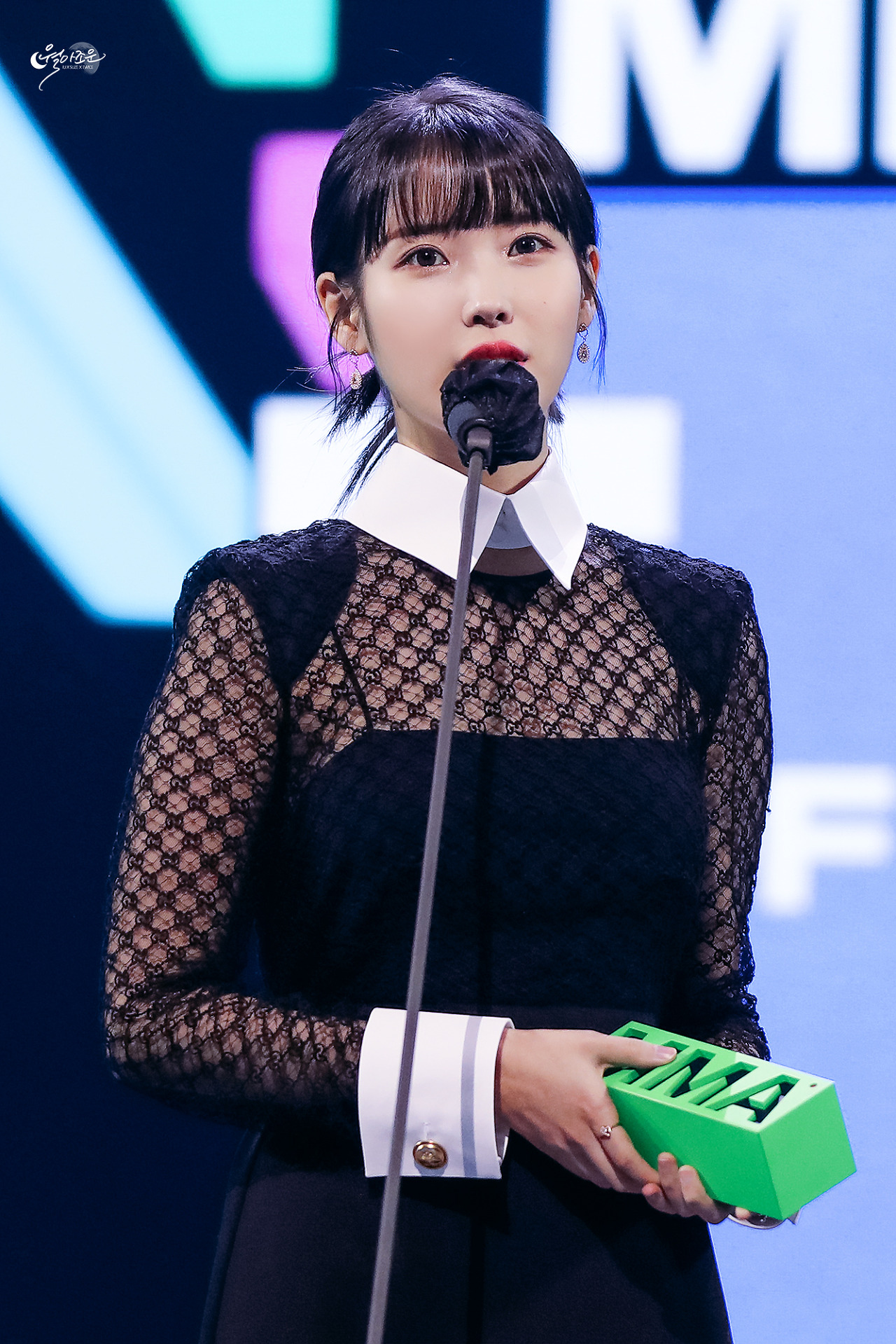
- IU at the 2021 Melon Music Awards
Awards and nominations
Award	Wins	Nominations
APAN Music Awards	1	2
APAN Star Awards	2	5
Asia Artist Awards	11	16
Asia Model Awards	1	1
Asian Film Awards	0	1
Asian Pop Music Awards	8	17
Baeksang Arts Awards	2	6
Blue Dragon Film Awards	1	2
Blue Dragon Series Awards	2	2
Brand Customer Loyalty Awards	2	2
Brand of the Year Awards	9	9
Bugs Music Awards	2	2
Buil Film Awards	1	2
Chunsa Film Art Awards	1	1
Cyworld Digital Music Awards	6	6
Fundex Awards	1	1
Gaon Chart Music Awards	16	26
Genie Music Awards	0	8
Golden Cinematography Awards	1	1
Golden Disc Awards	9	31
Grand Bell Awards	0	1
Hanteo Music Awards	1	1
Japan Gold Disc Awards	1	1
Joox Hong Kong Top Music Awards	1	1
Joox Indonesia Music Awards	0	1
K-World Dream Awards	1	1
KBS Drama Awards	2	8
KBS World Awards	1	1
Korea Advertising Association Awards	2	2
Korea Drama Awards	2	3
Korea First Brand Awards	4	4
Korea PD Awards	1	1
Korea Visual Arts Festival	1	1
Korean Association of Film Critics Awards	1	1
Korean Entertainment Awards in Japan	1	1
Korean Music Awards	6	16
Melon Music Awards	26	65
Ministry of Culture, Sports and Tourism Award	2	2
Mnet 20's Choice Awards	1	1
Mnet Asian Music Awards	15	62
MTV Millennial Awards	0	1
Newsis K-Expo Cultural Awards	1	1
Nickelodeon Korea Kids' Choice Awards	2	2
Philippine K-pop Awards	1	1
Republic of Korea Entertainment Arts Awards Ceremony	1	1
SBS Drama Awards	2	3
SBS Entertainment Awards	2	3
SBS MTV Best of the Best	2	5
Seoul International Drama Awards	1	2
Seoul International Youth Film Festival	0	1
Seoul Music Awards	7	34
Singapore Entertainment Awards	0	1
Sona Awards	1	1
Soompi Awards	3	5
Soribada Best K-Music Awards	0	1
Style Icon Awards	1	2
TVCF Awards	1	1
Visionary Awards	1	1
Weibo Music Awards	0	2
World Music Awards	0	3

Totals (Note: Certain award groups do not simply award one winner. They acknowledge several different recipients, have runners-up, and have third place. Since this is a specific recognition and is different from losing an award, runner-up mentions are considered wins in this award tally. For simplification and to avoid errors, each award in this list has been presumed to have had a prior nomination.)
- Wins: 172
- Nominations: 386

This is a list of awards and nominations received by South Korean singer-songwriter and actress Lee Ji-eun, best known by her stage name IU.

IU won Song of the Year at both the 3rd Melon Music Awards and the 9th Korean Music Awards for her single "Good Day". That same year, she won Record of the Year (Digital) at the 20th Seoul Music Awards and Best Solo Vocal Performance at the 13th Mnet Asian Music Awards. The single gathered a total of seven trophies on three music programs including Music Bank, Inkigayo and M Countdown. Her second Korean album Last Fantasy yielded one single, "You and I". Upon its release, Last Fantasy was a commercial success, selling almost seven million copies of digital tracks in its first week of release. The total number of its digital sales surpassed the 10 million mark the following week. The album sold over 117,000 copies, making it the 15th best-selling Korean album in 2011. The following year, she won Record of the Year (Album) and Best Female Artist at the 14th Mnet Asian Music Awards. She additionally earned ten trophies on music programs for her lead single "You & I".

In 2017, IU was one of the most nominated and awarded acts at the 9th Melon Music Awards, winning three out of six nominations, including Album of the Year, Top 10 Artists, and the Best Songwriter Award. At the 7th Gaon Chart Music Awards, she was nominated in seven categories winning five, including Lyricist of the Year and Producer of the Year for her third Korean album Palette. The singer also won Best Pop Album for Palette respectively at the 15th Korean Music Awards. At the 2018 Golden Disc Awards, she won two categories including Song of the Year for "Through the Night". On January 9, 2021, IU won Song of the Year at the 35th Golden Disc Awards for "Blueming", becoming the first female soloist to win two grand prizes in the award show's history.

She has been honored the Prime Minister's Commendation in 2015 by the Ministry of Culture, Sports and Tourism for her work as a musician and was recognized as a style icon by the Style Icon Awards in 2008 and 2011, respectively. In 2012, IU was identified as one of the most influential people in South Korea by the Forbes Korea Power Celebrity list, and has since been mentioned six times. IU has also won several awards for her work as an actress, earning the title of "Best New Actress" at the 2014 KBS Drama Awards for her performance in You're the Best!. In 2025 she won the award for "Best Actress" at the 4th Blue Dragon Series Awards, and "Artist of the Year (Actor)" at the 10th Asia Artist Awards, for her performance in the netflix television series When Life Gives You Tangerines.

== Awards and nominations ==
Name of the award ceremony, year presented, type of award, category of the award, nominee of the award, and the result of the nomination
Award ceremony	Year	Category	Nominee(s) / Work(s)	Result	Ref.
APAN Music Awards	2020	Idol Champ Fan's Pick – Solo	IU	Won	
APAN Music Awards	2020	Idol Champ Global Pick – Solo	IU	Nominated	
APAN Star Awards	2015	Excellence Award, Actress in a Miniseries	The Producers	Nominated	
APAN Star Awards	2018	Top Excellence Award, Actress in a Miniseries	My Mister	Won	
APAN Star Awards	2018	K-Star Award	My Mister	Nominated	
APAN Star Awards	2025	Grand Prize (Daesang)	When Life Gives You Tangerines	Won	
APAN Star Awards	2025	Top Excellence Award, Actress in a Miniseries	When Life Gives You Tangerines	Nominated	
Asia Artist Awards	2018	Artist of the Year – Television / Film	IU	Won	
Asia Artist Awards	2018	Asia Hot Artist – Television / Film	IU	Won	
Asia Artist Awards	2018	Best Actor Award	IU	Won	
Asia Artist Awards	2018	Popularity Award, Actress	IU	Won	
Asia Artist Awards	2018	Popularity Award, Singer	IU	Nominated	
Asia Artist Awards	2021	U+Idol Live Popularity Award – Singer	IU	Won	
Asia Artist Awards	2021	Female Solo Singer Popularity Award	IU	Nominated	
Asia Artist Awards	2023	Popularity Award – Singer (Female)	IU	Nominated	
Asia Artist Awards	2025	Artist of the Year – Actor (Daesang)	When Life Gives You Tangerines	Won	
Asia Artist Awards	2025	Best Artist – Actor	IU	Won	
Asia Artist Awards	2025	Hot Trend	IU	Won	
Asia Artist Awards	2025	Fabulous Award	IU	Won	
Asia Artist Awards	2025	Best Couple	IU (with Park Bo-gum) for When Life Gives You Tangerines	Won	
Asia Artist Awards	2025	AAA 10 Legendary Female Solo	IU	Won	
Asia Artist Awards	2026	Popularity Award – Solo (Female)	IU	Pending	
Asia Artist Awards	2026	Popularity Award, Actress	IU	Pending	
Asian Film Awards	2022	Best Newcomer	Broker	Nominated	
Asia Model Awards	2012	Popular Artist Award	IU	Won	
Asian Pop Music Awards	2020	Best Lyricist (Overseas)	Love Poem	Won	
Asian Pop Music Awards	2020	Outstanding Song of the Year	"Eight" (with Suga)	Won	
Asian Pop Music Awards	2020	Best Female Singer (Overseas)	Love Poem	Nominated	
Asian Pop Music Awards	2020	Best Producer (Overseas)	Love Poem	Nominated	
Asian Pop Music Awards	2021	Top 20 Albums of the Year (Overseas)	Lilac	Won	
Asian Pop Music Awards	2021	Top 20 Songs of the Year (Overseas)	"Lilac"	Won	
Asian Pop Music Awards	2022	Top 20 Albums of the Year (Overseas)	Pieces	Won	
Asian Pop Music Awards	2022	People's Choice Awards (Overseas)	IU	Won	
Asian Pop Music Awards	2022	Song of the Year (Overseas)	"Drama"	Nominated	
Asian Pop Music Awards	2022	Best Lyricist (Overseas)	"Winter Sleep"	Nominated	
Asian Pop Music Awards	2023	Best Collaboration (Overseas)	"People Pt. 2"	Nominated	
Asian Pop Music Awards	2024	Best Female Artist (Overseas)	IU	Nominated	
Asian Pop Music Awards	2024	Best Lyricist (Overseas)	"Love Wins All"	Nominated	
Asian Pop Music Awards	2024	Best Music Video (Overseas)	"Love Wins All"	Nominated	
Asian Pop Music Awards	2024	Top 20 Songs of the Year (Overseas)	"Love Wins All"	Won	
Asian Pop Music Awards	2025	Best OST	"Midnight Walk"	Won	
Asian Pop Music Awards	2025	People's Choice Awards	IU	Nominated	
Baeksang Arts Awards	2019	Most Popular Actress (TV)	My Mister	Won	
Baeksang Arts Awards	2019	Best Actress – Television	My Mister	Nominated	
Baeksang Arts Awards	2020	Best Actress – Television	Hotel del Luna	Nominated	
Baeksang Arts Awards	2023	Best New Actress – Film	Broker	Nominated	
Baeksang Arts Awards	2023	Most Popular Actress	Broker	Won	
Baeksang Arts Awards	2025	Best Actress – Television	When Life Gives You Tangerines	Nominated	
Blue Dragon Film Awards	2022	Best New Actress	Broker	Nominated	
Blue Dragon Film Awards	2022	Popular Star Award	Broker	Won	
Blue Dragon Series Awards	2025	Best Actress	When Life Gives You Tangerines	Won	
Blue Dragon Series Awards	2025	Popular Star Award	When Life Gives You Tangerines	Won	
Brand Customer Loyalty Awards	2021	Best Female Vocalist	IU	Won	
Brand Customer Loyalty Awards	2022	Best Singer-songwriter	IU	Won	
Brand of the Year Awards	2021	Female CF Model	IU	Won	
Brand of the Year Awards	2021	Female Solo Artist	IU	Won	
Brand of the Year Awards	2023	Best Actress (Movie)	IU	Won	
Brand of the Year Awards	2024	Female Solo Artist	IU	Won	
Brand of the Year Awards	2025	Best OTT Actress	IU	Won	
Brand of the Year Awards	2025	Female Vocalist (Indonesia)	IU	Won	
Brand of the Year Awards	2025	Best Actress (Vietnam)	IU	Won	
Brand of the Year Awards	2026	Female Vocalist (Indonesia)	IU	Won	
Brand of the Year Awards	2026	Best Actress – Drama (Vietnam)	IU	Won	
Bugs Music Awards	2020	20th Anniversary – Most Loved Music	"Through the Night"	Won	
Bugs Music Awards	2020	20th Anniversary – Most Loved Artists	IU	Won	
Buil Film Awards	2022	Best New Actress	Broker	Nominated	
Buil Film Awards	2022	Popular Star Award	Broker	Won	
Chunsa Film Art Awards	2022	Best New Actress	Broker	Won	
Cyworld Digital Music Awards	2010	Song of the Month – June	"Nagging" (feat. Lim Seul-ong)	Won	
Cyworld Digital Music Awards	2010	Song of the Month – December	"Good Day"	Won	
Cyworld Digital Music Awards	2011	Artist of the Year (Daesang)	IU	Won	
Cyworld Digital Music Awards	2011	Best Top Seller Artist	IU	Won	
Cyworld Digital Music Awards	2011	Song of the Month – December	"You & I"	Won	
Cyworld Digital Music Awards	2012	Song of the Month – May	"Peach"	Won	
Fundex Awards	2025	Best Actress of OTT Original Drama	When Life Gives You Tangerines	Won	
Gaon Chart Music Awards	2012	Song of the Year – February	"Only I Didn't Know"	Won	
Gaon Chart Music Awards	2012	Song of the Year – December	"You & I"	Won	
Gaon Chart Music Awards	2014	Song of the Year – October	"The Red Shoes"	Won	
Gaon Chart Music Awards	2015	Song of the Year – April	"Not Spring, Love, or Cherry Blossoms" (High4 feat. IU)	Nominated	
Gaon Chart Music Awards	2015	Song of the Year – May	"My Old Story"	Nominated	
Gaon Chart Music Awards	2016	Song of the Year – June	"Heart"	Nominated	
Gaon Chart Music Awards	2016	Song of the Year – October	"Twenty-three"	Nominated	
Gaon Chart Music Awards	2018	Lyricist and Producer of the Year	IU	Won	
Gaon Chart Music Awards	2018	Music Steady Seller of the Year	"Through the Night"	Won	
Gaon Chart Music Awards	2018	Song of the Year – March	"Through the Night"	Won	
Gaon Chart Music Awards	2018	Song of the Year – April	"Palette" (feat. G-Dragon)	Won	
Gaon Chart Music Awards	2018	Song of the Year – April	"Can't Love You Anymore" (with Oh Hyuk)	Nominated	
Gaon Chart Music Awards	2018	Song of the Year – September	"Autumn Morning"	Nominated	
Gaon Chart Music Awards	2019	Song of the Year – October	"Bbibbi"	Won	
Gaon Chart Music Awards	2020	Song of the Year – November	"Love Poem"	Won	
Gaon Chart Music Awards	2020	Song of the Year – November	"Blueming"	Nominated	
Gaon Chart Music Awards	2021	Song of the Year – May	"Eight" Prod. & Feat.Suga	Won	
Gaon Chart Music Awards	2021	Music Steady Seller of the Year	"Blueming"	Won	
Gaon Chart Music Awards	2021	Lyricist of the Year	IU	Won	
Gaon Chart Music Awards	2022	Song of the Year – January	"Celebrity"	Won	
Gaon Chart Music Awards	2022	Song of the Year – March	"Lilac"	Won	
Gaon Chart Music Awards	2022	Song of the Year – October	"Strawberry Moon"	Won	
Gaon Chart Music Awards	2022	Lyricist of the year	IU	Won	
Gaon Chart Music Awards	2022	Song of the Year – March	"Coin"	Nominated	
Gaon Chart Music Awards	2022	Song of the Year – March	"Hi Spring Bye"	Nominated	
Gaon Chart Music Awards	2022	Mubeat Global Choice – Female	IU	Nominated	
Genie Music Awards	2019	The Female Solo Artist	IU	Nominated	
Genie Music Awards	2019	Genie Music Popularity Award	IU	Nominated	
Genie Music Awards	2019	Global Popularity Award	IU	Nominated	
Genie Music Awards	2019	The Top Artist	IU	Nominated	
Genie Music Awards	2022	Best Female Artist	IU	Nominated	
Genie Music Awards	2022	Singer of the Year	IU	Nominated	
Genie Music Awards	2022	Song of the Year	"Strawberry Moon"	Nominated	
Genie Music Awards	2022	Popularity Award	IU	Nominated	
Golden Cinematography Awards	2022	Best New Actress	Broker	Won	
Golden Disc Awards	2010	Digital Bonsang	"Nagging" (feat. Lim Seul-ong)	Won	
Golden Disc Awards	2010	Digital Daesang	"Nagging" (feat. Lim Seul-ong)	Nominated	
Golden Disc Awards	2010	Popularity Award	IU	Nominated	
Golden Disc Awards	2012	Digital Daesang	"Only I Didn't Know"	Nominated	
Golden Disc Awards	2012	Popularity Award	IU	Nominated	
Golden Disc Awards	2013	Digital Daesang	"Every End of the Day"	Nominated	
Golden Disc Awards	2013	Popularity Award	IU	Nominated	
Golden Disc Awards	2014	Digital Daesang	"The Red Shoes"	Nominated	
Golden Disc Awards	2014	Disc Daesang	Modern Times	Nominated	
Golden Disc Awards	2014	Popularity Award	IU	Nominated	
Golden Disc Awards	2015	Digital Daesang	"Not Spring, Love, or Cherry Blossoms" (High4 feat. IU)	Nominated	
Golden Disc Awards	2015	Digital Daesang	"My Old Story"	Nominated	
Golden Disc Awards	2015	Popularity Award	IU	Nominated	
Golden Disc Awards	2018	Digital Bonsang	"Through the Night"	Won	
Golden Disc Awards	2018	Digital Daesang	"Through the Night"	Won	
Golden Disc Awards	2018	Disc Daesang	Palette	Nominated	
Golden Disc Awards	2018	Global Popularity Award	IU	Nominated	
Golden Disc Awards	2019	Digital Daesang	"Bbibbi"	Nominated	
Golden Disc Awards	2019	NetEase Most Popular K-pop Star	IU	Nominated	
Golden Disc Awards	2019	Popularity Award	IU	Nominated	
Golden Disc Awards	2021	Digital Bonsang	"Blueming"	Won	
Golden Disc Awards	2021	Digital Daesang	"Blueming"	Won	
Golden Disc Awards	2021	Curaprox Popularity Award	IU	Nominated	
Golden Disc Awards	2021	QQ Music Popularity Award	IU	Nominated	
Golden Disc Awards	2022	Album Bonsang	Lilac	Won	
Golden Disc Awards	2022	Digital Bonsang	"Celebrity"	Won	
Golden Disc Awards	2022	Digital Daesang	"Celebrity"	Won	
Golden Disc Awards	2022	Seezn Most Popular Artist Award	IU	Nominated	
Golden Disc Awards	2023	Digital Song Bonsang	"Drama"	Nominated	
Golden Disc Awards	2025	Digital Song Bonsang	"Love Wins All"	Won	
Golden Disc Awards	2025	Digital Song Daesang	"Love Wins All"	Nominated	
Grand Bell Awards	2022	Best New Actress	Broker	Nominated	
iMBC Awards	2026	Best Korean Actress	IU	Won	
Hanteo Music Awards	2024	Artist of the Year (bonsang)	IU	Won	
Japan Gold Disc Award	2013	Best 3 New Artists (Asia)	IU	Won	
Joox Indonesia Music Awards	2021	Korean Artist of the Year	IU	Nominated	
Joox Hong Kong Top Music Awards	2020	Top 20 K-Pop Songs	"Eight" (feat. Suga)	Won	
KBS Drama Awards	2011	Best Couple Award	IU (with Jang Wooyoung); Dream High	Nominated	
KBS Drama Awards	2011	Best New Actress	Dream High	Nominated	
KBS Drama Awards	2013	Best Couple Award	IU (with Jo Jung-suk); You Are the Best!	Won	
KBS Drama Awards	2013	Best New Actress	You Are the Best!, Bel Ami	Won	
KBS Drama Awards	2013	Best Couple Award	IU (with Jang Keun-suk); Bel Ami	Nominated	
KBS Drama Awards	2013	Excellence Award, Actress in a Serial Drama	You Are the Best!, Bel Ami	Nominated	
KBS Drama Awards	2015	Best Couple Award	IU (with Kim Soo-hyun); The Producers	Nominated	
KBS Drama Awards	2015	Popularity Award, Actress	The Producers	Nominated	
KBS World Awards	2018	Best Solo	IU	Won	
Korea Advertising Association Awards	2011	Good Model Award	IU	Won	
Korea Advertising Association Awards	2021	Advertisers' Choice-Great Model Award	IU	Won	
Korea Drama Awards	2015	Excellence Award, Actress	The Producers	Nominated	
Korea Drama Awards	2026	Hot Star (Female)	IU	Won	
Korea Drama Awards	2026	Best Couple Award	IU (with Byeon Woo-seok); Perfect Crown	Won	
Korea First Brand Awards	2019	Best Actress	IU	Won	
Korea First Brand Awards	2020	Female CF Model of the Year	IU	Won	
Korea First Brand Awards	2024	Best Singer-Songwriter (Vietnam)	IU	Won	
Korea First Brand Awards	2026	Female Advertising Model	IU	Won	
Korea PD Awards	2012	Singer Award	IU	Won	
Korea Visual Arts Festival	2010	Photogenic Award	IU	Won	
Korean Association of Film Critics Awards	2022	Best New Actress	Broker	Won	
Korean Entertainment Awards in Japan	2013	Best Female Solo Singer	IU	Won	
Korean Music Awards	2012	Female Musician of the Year Netizen Vote	IU	Won	
Korean Music Awards	2012	Best Korean Pop Song	"Good Day"	Won	
Korean Music Awards	2012	Song of the Year (Daesang)	"Good Day"	Won	
Korean Music Awards	2016	Netizens' Choice: Female Artist	IU	Won	
Korean Music Awards	2016	Best Pop Album	Chat-Shire	Nominated	
Korean Music Awards	2016	Best Pop Song	"Twenty-Three"	Nominated	
Korean Music Awards	2018	Best Pop Album	Palette	Won	
Korean Music Awards	2018	Album of the Year (Daesang)	Palette	Nominated	
Korean Music Awards	2018	Best Pop Song	"Through the Night"	Nominated	
Korean Music Awards	2018	Musician of the Year (Daesang)	IU	Nominated	
Korean Music Awards	2018	Song of the Year (Daesang)	"Through the Night"	Nominated	
Korean Music Awards	2022	Best Pop Album	Lilac	Won	
Korean Music Awards	2022	Album of the Year (Daesang)	Lilac	Nominated	
Korean Music Awards	2022	Musician of the Year (Daesang)	IU	Nominated	
Korean Music Awards	2022	Best Pop Song	"Lilac"	Nominated	
Korean Music Awards	2025	Best Pop Song	"Love Wins All"	Nominated	
K-World Dream Awards	2025	Best Digital Music	IU	Won	
Melon Music Awards	2010	Top 10 Artist	IU	Won	
Melon Music Awards	2010	Artist of the Year (Daesang)	IU	Nominated	
Melon Music Awards	2010	Song of the Year (Daesang)	"Nagging" (feat. Lim Seul-ong)	Nominated	
Melon Music Awards	2011	Song of the Year (Daesang)	"Good Day"	Won	
Melon Music Awards	2011	Top 10 Artist	IU	Won	
Melon Music Awards	2011	Album of the Year (Daesang)	Real	Nominated	
Melon Music Awards	2011	Artist of the Year (Daesang)	IU	Nominated	
Melon Music Awards	2012	Top 10 Artist	IU	Won	
Melon Music Awards	2012	Album of the Year (Daesang)	Last Fantasy	Nominated	
Melon Music Awards	2012	Artist of the Year (Daesang)	IU	Nominated	
Melon Music Awards	2012	Netizen Popularity Award	IU	Nominated	
Melon Music Awards	2012	Song of the Year (Daesang)	"You & I"	Nominated	
Melon Music Awards	2013	Top 10 Artist	IU	Won	
Melon Music Awards	2013	Album of the Year (Daesang)	Modern Times	Nominated	
Melon Music Awards	2013	Artist of the Year (Daesang)	IU	Nominated	
Melon Music Awards	2013	Song of the Year (Daesang)	"The Red Shoes"	Nominated	
Melon Music Awards	2014	Artist of the Year (Daesang)	IU	Won	
Melon Music Awards	2014	Top 10 Artist	IU	Won	
Melon Music Awards	2014	Album of the Year (Daesang)	A Flower Bookmark	Nominated	
Melon Music Awards	2014	Best Ballad Award	"Friday" (feat. Jang Yi-jeong)	Nominated	
Melon Music Awards	2014	Best Ballad Award	"Not Spring, Love, or Cherry Blossoms" (High4 feat. IU)	Nominated	
Melon Music Awards	2014	Hot Trend Award	"Not Spring, Love, or Cherry Blossoms" (High4 feat. IU)	Nominated	
Melon Music Awards	2014	Song of the Year (Daesang)	"Friday" (feat. Jang Yi-jeong)	Nominated	
Melon Music Awards	2014	Song of the Year (Daesang)	"Not Spring, Love, or Cherry Blossoms" (High4 feat. IU)	Nominated	
Melon Music Awards	2015	Song of the Year (Daesang)	"Heart"	Nominated	
Melon Music Awards	2017	Album of the Year (Daesang)	Palette	Won	
Melon Music Awards	2017	Best Songwriter	IU	Won	
Melon Music Awards	2017	Top 10 Artist	IU	Won	
Melon Music Awards	2017	Artist of the Year (Daesang)	IU	Nominated	
Melon Music Awards	2017	Kakao Hot Star Award	IU	Nominated	
Melon Music Awards	2017	Song of the Year (Daesang)	"Through the Night"	Nominated	
Melon Music Awards	2018	Best R&B/Soul Award	"Bbibbi"	Won	
Melon Music Awards	2020	Best Rock Song	"Eight" (with Suga)	Won	
Melon Music Awards	2020	Top 10 Artist	IU	Won	
Melon Music Awards	2020	Artist of the Year (Daesang)	IU	Nominated	
Melon Music Awards	2020	Best Ballad	"First Winter"	Nominated	
Melon Music Awards	2020	Best OST	"Give You My Heart"	Nominated	
Melon Music Awards	2020	Netizen Popularity Award	IU	Nominated	
Melon Music Awards	2020	Song of the Year (Daesang)	"Eight" (with Suga)	Nominated	
Melon Music Awards	2021	Best Female Artist	IU	Won	
Melon Music Awards	2021	Top 10 Artist	IU	Won	
Melon Music Awards	2021	Best Songwriter Award	IU	Won	
Melon Music Awards	2021	Artist of the Year (Daesang)	IU	Won	
Melon Music Awards	2021	Album of the Year (Daesang)	Lilac	Won	
Melon Music Awards	2021	Netizen Popularity Award	IU	Nominated	
Melon Music Awards	2021	Song of the Year (Daesang)	"Celebrity"	Nominated	
Melon Music Awards	2022	Stage of the Year	The Golden Hour: Under the Orange Sun	Won	
Melon Music Awards	2022	Best Female Solo Artist	IU	Won	
Melon Music Awards	2022	Top 10 Artist	IU	Won	
Melon Music Awards	2022	Artist of the Year (Daesang)	IU	Nominated	
Melon Music Awards	2022	Album of the Year (Daesang)	Pieces	Nominated	
Melon Music Awards	2022	Song of the Year (Daesang)	"Ganadara" with Jay Park	Nominated	
Melon Music Awards	2024	Top 10 Artist	IU	Won	
Melon Music Awards	2024	Artist of the Year (Daesang)	IU	Nominated	
Melon Music Awards	2024	Album of the Year (Daesang)	The Winning	Nominated	
Melon Music Awards	2024	Song of the Year (Daesang)	"Love Wins All"	Nominated	
Melon Music Awards	2024	Millions Top 10	The Winning	Won	
Melon Music Awards	2024	Best Solo – Female	IU	Won	
Melon Music Awards	2024	Stage of the Year	HEREH World Tour	Won	
Melon Music Awards	2025	Millions Top 10	A Flower Bookmark 3	Won	
Melon Music Awards	2025	Album of the Year (Daesang)	A Flower Bookmark 3	Nominated	
Melon Music Awards	2025	Top 10 Artist	IU	Nominated	
Melon Music Awards	2025	Best Solo – Female	IU	Nominated	
Melon Music Awards	2025	Berriz Global Fans' Choice	IU	Nominated	
Melon Music Awards	2026	Best Solo – Female	IU	Pending	
Ministry of Culture, Sports and Tourism Award	2008	Excellent Rookie Record of the November	Lost and Found	Won	
Ministry of Culture, Sports and Tourism Award	2008	Best Newcomer Album of the Month	Lost and Found	Won	
Mnet 20's Choice Awards	2011	Hot CF Star	IU	Won	
Mnet Asian Music Awards	2010	Best Collaboration	"Nagging" (feat. Lim Seul-ong)	Nominated	
Mnet Asian Music Awards	2010	Best Collaboration	"It's You" (Sung Si-kyung feat. IU)	Nominated	
Mnet Asian Music Awards	2011	Artist of the Year (Daesang)	IU	Nominated	
Mnet Asian Music Awards	2011	Best Female Artist	IU	Nominated	
Mnet Asian Music Awards	2011	Best Vocal Performance – Solo	"Good Day"	Won	
Mnet Asian Music Awards	2011	Song of the Year (Daesang)	"Good Day"	Nominated	
Mnet Asian Music Awards	2011	Best OST	"Someday" (Dream High OST)	Nominated	
Mnet Asian Music Awards	2011	Best Female Artist	IU	Won	
Mnet Asian Music Awards	2012	Artist of the Year (Daesang)	IU	Nominated	
Mnet Asian Music Awards	2012	Song of the Year (Daesang)	"You & I"	Nominated	
Mnet Asian Music Awards	2012	Best Vocal Performance – Solo	"You & I"	Nominated	
Mnet Asian Music Awards	2013	Artist of the Year (Daesang)	IU	Nominated	
Mnet Asian Music Awards	2013	Best Female Artist	IU	Nominated	
Mnet Asian Music Awards	2013	Song of the Year (Daesang)	"The Red Shoes"	Nominated	
Mnet Asian Music Awards	2013	Best Vocal Performance – Female	"The Red Shoes"	Nominated	
Mnet Asian Music Awards	2014	Artist of the Year (Daesang)	IU	Nominated	
Mnet Asian Music Awards	2014	Best Female Artist	IU	Won	
Mnet Asian Music Awards	2014	Most Popular Vocalist	IU	Won	
Mnet Asian Music Awards	2014	Song of the Year (Daesang)	"Friday" (feat. Jang Yi-jeong)	Nominated	
Mnet Asian Music Awards	2014	Best Vocal Performance – Female	"Friday" (feat. Jang Yi-jeong)	Nominated	
Mnet Asian Music Awards	2015	Artist of the Year (Daesang)	IU	Nominated	
Mnet Asian Music Awards	2015	Best Female Artist	IU	Nominated	
Mnet Asian Music Awards	2017	Best Female Artist	IU	Won	
Mnet Asian Music Awards	2017	Artist of the Year (Daesang)	IU	Nominated	
Mnet Asian Music Awards	2017	Best Vocal Performance – Female	"Through the Night"	Nominated	
Mnet Asian Music Awards	2017	Song of the Year (Daesang)	"Through the Night"	Nominated	
Mnet Asian Music Awards	2017	Song of the Year (Daesang)	"Can't Love You Anymore" (with Oh Hyuk)	Nominated	
Mnet Asian Music Awards	2017	Best Collaboration	"Can't Love You Anymore" (with Oh Hyuk)	Nominated	
Mnet Asian Music Awards	2018	Artist of the Year (Daesang)	IU	Nominated	
Mnet Asian Music Awards	2018	Best Female Artist	IU	Nominated	
Mnet Asian Music Awards	2020	Best Female Artist	IU	Won	
Mnet Asian Music Awards	2020	Artist of the Year (Daesang)	IU	Nominated	
Mnet Asian Music Awards	2020	Worldwide Fans' Choice Top 10	IU	Nominated	
Mnet Asian Music Awards	2020	Best Vocal Performance – Solo	"Blueming"	Won	
Mnet Asian Music Awards	2020	Song of the Year (Daesang)	"Blueming"	Nominated	
Mnet Asian Music Awards	2020	Song of the Year (Daesang)	"Eight" (with Suga)	Nominated	
Mnet Asian Music Awards	2020	Best Collaboration	"Eight" (with Suga)	Won	
Mnet Asian Music Awards	2020	Best Collaboration	"First Winter" (with Sung Si Kyung)	Nominated	
Mnet Asian Music Awards	2020	Song of the Year (Daesang)	"First Winter" (with Sung Si Kyung)	Nominated	
Mnet Asian Music Awards	2021	Best Female Artist	IU	Won	
Mnet Asian Music Awards	2021	Artist of the Year (Daesang)	IU	Nominated	
Mnet Asian Music Awards	2021	Worldwide Fans' Choice Top 10	IU	Nominated	
Mnet Asian Music Awards	2021	Song of the Year (Daesang)	"Celebrity"	Nominated	
Mnet Asian Music Awards	2021	Best Vocal Performance – Solo	"Celebrity"	Won	
Mnet Asian Music Awards	2021	Best Collaboration	"Nakka" (with AKMU)	Won	
Mnet Asian Music Awards	2022	Best Female Artist	IU	Nominated	
Mnet Asian Music Awards	2022	Artist of the Year (Daesang)	IU	Nominated	
Mnet Asian Music Awards	2022	Worldwide Fans' Choice Top 10	IU	Nominated	
Mnet Asian Music Awards	2022	Best Vocal Performance – Solo	"Drama"	Nominated	
Mnet Asian Music Awards	2022	Song of the Year (Daesang)	"Drama"	Nominated	
Mnet Asian Music Awards	2022	Song of the Year (Daesang)	"Ganadara" (with Jay Park)	Nominated	
Mnet Asian Music Awards	2022	Best Hip Hop & Urban Music	"Ganadara" (with Jay Park)	Won	
Mnet Asian Music Awards	2024	Artist of the Year (Daesang)	IU	Nominated	
Mnet Asian Music Awards	2024	Song of the Year (Daesang)	"Love Wins All"	Nominated	
Mnet Asian Music Awards	2024	Fans' Choice of the Year	IU	Nominated	
Mnet Asian Music Awards	2024	Best Female Artist	IU	Won	
Mnet Asian Music Awards	2024	Best Vocal Performance – Solo	"Love Wins All"	Nominated	
Mnet Asian Music Awards	2024	Best Music Video	"Love Wins All"	Nominated	
Mnet Asian Music Awards	2024	Worldwide Fans' Choice Top 10	IU	Won	
Mnet Asian Music Awards	2025	Worldwide Fans' Choice Top 10	IU	Won	
Mnet Asian Music Awards	2025	Fans' Choice of the Year	IU	Nominated	
Mnet Asian Music Awards	2026	Best Vocal Performance – Solo	"Unknown Planet"	Pending	
MTV Millennial Awards	2021	K-Pop Dominion	IU	Nominated	
Newsis K-Expo Cultural Awards	2025	Minister of Culture, Sports and Tourism Award	IU	Won	
Nickelodeon Korea Kids' Choice Awards	2011	Favorite Female Singer	IU	Won	
Nickelodeon Korea Kids' Choice Awards	2012	Favorite Female Singer	IU	Won	
Philippine K-pop Awards	2017	Best Female Solo Artist	IU	Won	
Republic of Korea Entertainment Arts Awards	2010	New Generation Singer Award	IU	Won	
SBS Drama Awards	2016	Best Couple Award	IU with Lee Joon-gi; Moon Lovers: Scarlet Heart Ryeo	Won	
SBS Drama Awards	2016	Idol Academy Award, Heart-wrenching Award	IU	Won	
SBS Drama Awards	2016	Hallyu Star Award	Moon Lovers: Scarlet Heart Ryeo	Nominated	
SBS Entertainment Awards	2010	New Star Award	Heroes	Won	
SBS Entertainment Awards	2010	Best Teamwork Award	Heroes	Won	
SBS Entertainment Awards	2011	Netizen Popularity Award	Heroes and Kim Yuna's Kiss & Cry	Nominated	
SBS MTV Best of the Best	2013	Album of the Year	Modern Times	Nominated	
SBS MTV Best of the Best	2013	Artist of the Year	IU	Nominated	
SBS MTV Best of the Best	2013	Best Solo (Female)	IU	Won	
SBS MTV Best of the Best	2014	Artist of the Year	IU	Nominated	
SBS MTV Best of the Best	2014	Best Solo (Female)	IU	Won	
Seoul International Drama Awards	2014	Outstanding Korean Actress	IU	Nominated	
Seoul International Drama Awards	2025	Outstanding Korean Actress	IU	Won	
Seoul International Youth Film Festival	2014	Best Young Actress	IU	Nominated	
Seoul Music Awards	2011	Record of the Year in Digital Release	"Good Day"	Won	
Seoul Music Awards	2011	Daesang Award	IU	Nominated	
Seoul Music Awards	2011	Bonsang Award	IU	Won	
Seoul Music Awards	2011	Popularity Award	IU	Nominated	
Seoul Music Awards	2012	Best Album Award	Last Fantasy	Won	
Seoul Music Awards	2012	Bonsang Award	IU	Won	
Seoul Music Awards	2012	Daesang Award	IU	Nominated	
Seoul Music Awards	2012	Popularity Award	IU	Nominated	
Seoul Music Awards	2013	Bonsang Award	IU	Nominated	
Seoul Music Awards	2013	Popularity Award	IU	Nominated	
Seoul Music Awards	2016	Bonsang Award	IU	Nominated	
Seoul Music Awards	2016	Popularity Award	IU	Nominated	
Seoul Music Awards	2016	Hallyu Special Award	IU	Nominated	
Seoul Music Awards	2018	Best Album Award	Palette	Won	
Seoul Music Awards	2018	Bonsang Award	IU	Nominated	
Seoul Music Awards	2018	Popularity Award	IU	Nominated	
Seoul Music Awards	2018	Hallyu Special Award	IU	Nominated	
Seoul Music Awards	2019	Bonsang Award	IU	Nominated	
Seoul Music Awards	2019	Popularity Award	IU	Nominated	
Seoul Music Awards	2019	Hallyu Special Award	IU	Nominated	
Seoul Music Awards	2021	Bonsang Award	IU	Nominated	
Seoul Music Awards	2021	Hallyu Special Award	IU	Nominated	
Seoul Music Awards	2021	Popularity Award	IU	Nominated	
Seoul Music Awards	2021	QQ Music Most Popular K-Pop Artist Award	IU	Nominated	
Seoul Music Awards	2022	Best Song Award	"Lilac"	Won	
Seoul Music Awards	2022	Bonsang Award	IU	Won	
Seoul Music Awards	2022	K-wave Popularity Award	IU	Nominated	
Seoul Music Awards	2022	Popularity Award	IU	Nominated	
Seoul Music Awards	2022	U+Idol Live Best Artist Award	IU	Nominated	
Seoul Music Awards	2026	The Best Award	IU	Nominated	
Seoul Music Awards	2026	Popularity Award	IU	Nominated	
Seoul Music Awards	2026	K-pop World Choice – Solo	IU	Nominated	
Seoul Music Awards	2026	New Icon Award	IU	Nominated	
Singapore Entertainment Awards	2014	Most Popular Korean Singer	IU	Nominated	
Sona Awards	2013	Best Artist (Female)	IU	Won	
Soompi Awards	2014	Best Female Solo	IU	Nominated	
Soompi Awards	2015	Best Female Solo	IU	Won	
Soompi Awards	2017	Best Female Solo	IU	Nominated	
Soompi Awards	2018	Best Female Solo	IU	Won	
Soompi Awards	2019	Best Female Solo	IU	Won	
Soribada Best K-Music Awards	2018	Bonsang Award	IU	Nominated	
Style Icon Awards	2011	Top 10 Style Icons	IU	Won	
Style Icon Awards	2014	Top 10 Style Icons	IU	Nominated	
TVCF Awards	2011	Model of the Year	IU	Won	
Visionary Awards (Note: Visionary Awards, which started in 2020, selects and awards people who lead roles in the Korean entertainment industry. It highlights the meaning and achievements of a person whose chosen trend keywords penetrated the entertainment industry, including broadcasting, movies, music, and performances, and presents the next vision of the cultural sector with outstanding achievements and influence.)	2023	2023 Visionary	IU	Won	
Weibo Music Awards	2025	Recommended Song of the Year	"Never Ending Story"	Nominated	
Weibo Music Awards	2025	Recommended Person of the Year (Overseas Singer)	IU	Nominated	
World Music Awards	2014	World's Best Female Artist	IU	Nominated	
World Music Awards	2014	World's Best Live Act	IU	Nominated	
World Music Awards	2014	World's Best Entertainer of the Year	IU	Nominated	

== Other accolades ==
=== Honors ===
Name of country or organization, year given, and name of honor or award
Country or organization	Year	Honor / Award	Ref.
Financial Services Commission	2023	Presidential Citation	
Journalists Association of Korea	2018	Donation Angel Award	
Korean Popular Culture and Arts Awards (Note: Honors from South Korean Government given at the Korean Popular Culture and Arts Awards, organized by the Korea Creative Content Agency and hosted by the Ministry of Culture, Sports and Tourism.)	2015	Prime Minister's Commendation	
K-Star Awards	2023	A Proud Korean Who Makes Korea Honorable	
National Tax Service	2020	Presidential Commendation	
Newsis K-Expo Cultural Awards (Note: Co-sponsored by Korea's Ministry of Culture, Sports and Tourism, Ministry of Trade, Industry, and Energy, Korea Communications Commission, and Korea Creative Content Agency, it awards cultural icons and businesses that promote the sustainability of the Korean Wave and boost the industry's competitiveness.)	2025	Minister of Culture, Sports and Tourism Award	

=== Listicles ===
Key
‡	Indicates category selected by respondents in age group: 13–39
†	Indicates category selected by respondents in age group: 40 and above

Name of publisher, year listed, name of listicle, and placement
Publisher	Year	Listicle	Placement	Ref.
APEC Summit	2025	Asia-Pacific Leaders Under 35 in 2025	Included	
Forbes Korea	2012	Korea Power Celebrity	3rd	
Forbes Korea	2013	Korea Power Celebrity	8th	
Forbes Korea	2014	Korea Power Celebrity	10th	
Forbes Korea	2015	Korea Power Celebrity	14th	
Forbes Korea	2016	Korea Power Celebrity	9th	
Forbes Korea	2018	Korea Power Celebrity	5th	
Forbes Korea	2019	Korea Power Celebrity	14th	
Forbes Korea	2019	Asia's Annual Heroes of Philanthropy	Included	
Forbes Korea	2020	Korea Power Celebrity	19th	
Forbes Korea	2021	Korea Power Celebrity	13th	
Forbes Korea	2021	30 Under 30 – Asia	Included	
Forbes Korea	2022	Korea Power Celebrity	11th	
Forbes Korea	2023	Korea Power Celebrity	18th	
Forbes Korea	2024	Korea Power Celebrity	30th	
Forbes Korea	2025	Korea Power Celebrity	1st	
Forbes Korea	2025	K-Idol of the Year 30	19th	
Gallup Korea	2014	Korea's Favorite Singer	4th	
Gallup Korea	2019	Korea's Favorite Singer	4th	
Gallup Korea	2024	Korea's Favorite Singer	2nd	
Gallup Korea	2019	Television Actor of the Year	7th	
Gallup Korea	2025	Television Actor of the Year	2nd	
Gallup Korea	2011	Singer of the Year	5th	
Gallup Korea	2012	Singer of the Year	4th	
Gallup Korea	2013	Singer of the Year	6th	
Gallup Korea	2014	Singer of the Year	1st	
Gallup Korea	2015	Singer of the Year	2nd	
Gallup Korea	2017	Singer of the Year	1st	
Gallup Korea	2018	Singer of the Year	3rd	
Gallup Korea	2019	Singer of the Year	4th	
Gallup Korea	2020	‡ Singer of the Year	2nd	
Gallup Korea	2021	‡ Singer of the Year	2nd	
Gallup Korea	2022	‡ Singer of the Year	2nd	
Gallup Korea	2023	‡ Singer of the Year	4th	
Gallup Korea	2024	‡ Singer of the Year	2nd	
Gallup Korea	2025	‡ Singer of the Year	1st	
Gallup Korea	2024	† Singer of the Year	7th	
Gallup Korea	2025	† Singer of the Year	6th	
Golden Disc Awards	2025	Golden Disc Powerhouse 40	Included	
IZM	2025	The 25 Greatest Musicians of the first 25 Years of the 21st Century	Included	
Korea Broadcast Advertising Corporation	2015	Advertising Model of the Year	10th	
Korea Broadcast Advertising Corporation	2018	Advertising Model of the Year	7th	
Korea Broadcast Advertising Corporation	2019	Advertising Model of the Year	10th	
Korea Broadcast Advertising Corporation	2020	Advertising Model of the Year	1st	
Korea Broadcast Advertising Corporation	2022	Advertising Model of the Year	1st	
Korea Broadcast Advertising Corporation	2023	Advertising Model of the Year	1st	
Korea Broadcast Advertising Corporation	2025	Advertising Model of the Year	1st	
Korea Newspaper Journalists Association	2026	K-Culture 100 Great Koreans Awards	Included	
Rolling Stone	2023	The 200 Greatest Singers of All Time	135th	
Sisa Journal (Note: The Sisa Journal is one of the major weekly news magazines in Korea. Established in 1989, its annually conducted 'Who Moves Korea' survey determines the most influential figures in the country and highlights next-generation leaders of Korea. The survey is conducted on a total of 1000 experts across 10 fields, including professors, journalists, politicians, businessmen, and cultural artists.)	2021	Most Influential People in Broadcasting and Entertainment	9th	
