= A Flower Bookmark 3 =

EP by IU
- Released: May 27, 2025
- Length: 21:56
- Language: Korean
- Label: Edam

IU chronology
The Winning (2024)	A Flower Bookmark 3 (2025)

Singles from A Flower Bookmark 3
- 1. "Never Ending Story" Released: May 27, 2025

Professional ratings
Review scores
Source	Rating
IZM	1.5/5 stars

A Flower Bookmark 3 (Korean: 꽃갈피 셋; RR: Kkotgalpi set) is the third cover extended play and tenth overall by South Korean singer-songwriter IU, following her previous A Flower Bookmark (2014) and A Flower Bookmark 2 (2017). It was released on May 27, 2025, by Edam Entertainment, and contains six tracks including the lead single "Never Ending Story". Like her previous cover EP, A Flower Bookmark 3 features cover versions of nostalgic K-pop songs popularized from the late 1980s to the early 2000s.

== Background ==
In 2014, IU released her first cover EP, titled A Flower Bookmark which featured K-pop songs popularized from the 1980s to 1990s. In 2017, she released a follow up EP of the same title, A Flower Bookmark 2 which featured songs from the 1960s to 2000s.

On May 17, 2025, she released multiple concept photos, mirroring the album artwork of the tracks she planned to include on the EP. The teaser featured a recreation of the individual album artworks of W.H.I.T.E's Dream Come True (1996), Seo Taiji's 7th Issue (2004), Roller Coaster's Absolute (2002), Park Hye-kyung's Feel Me (2002), and Shin Joong-hyun's Golden (1988).

On the 19th, pre-orders were opened for the EP, and she released additional concept photos and teaser for the song, "Red Sneakers".

Two music videos were released for "Never Ending Story" and "A Beautiful Person", with South Korean actor Heo Nam-jun and singer and actor Cha Eun-woo making special appearances. The music video for "Never Ending Story" was directed by Lee Rae-kyung, who previously directed the music videos for IU's "Palette" and "Through the Night", and pays homage to the 1998 film Christmas in August.

== Track listing ==
A Flower Bookmark 3 track listing
No.	Title	Lyrics	Music	Arrangement	Length
1.	"Red Sneakers" (빨간 운동화; Ppalgan undonghwa)	Park Hye-kyung; Lee Jae-hak	Park Hye-kyung	Lee Jin-na	3:26
2.	"Never Ending Story"	Kim Tae-won	Kim Tae-won	Seo Dong-hwan	3:44
3.	"October 4th" (10월 4일; Si-wol sa-il)	Seo Taiji	Seo Taiji	Gu-reum	3:52
4.	"Last Scene" (featuring Wonstein)	Joe Won-sun	Joe Won-sun	Sumin; Slom; Koo Young-jun	4:03
5.	"A Beautiful Person" (미인; Miin; featuring Balming Tiger)	Shin Joong-hyun; Sogumm	Shin Joong-hyun; sogumm	Balming Tiger (Unsinkable, Leesuho, bj wnjn, San Yawn)	3:30
6.	"Square's Dream" (네모의 꿈; Nemoui kkum)	Yoo Young-seok	Yoo Young-seok	Jehwi; flexindoor	3:21
Total length:					21:56

== Charts ==
=== Weekly charts ===
Weekly chart performance for A Flower Bookmark 3
Chart (2025)	Peak position
Japanese Albums (Oricon)	50
Japanese Digital Albums (Oricon)	20
South Korean Albums (Circle)	8

=== Monthly charts ===
Monthly chart performance for A Flower Bookmark 3
Chart (2025)	Position
South Korean Albums (Circle)	21

=== Year-end charts ===
Year-end chart performance for A Flower Bookmark 3
Chart (2025)	Position
South Korean Albums (Circle)	96
