= Eight (song) =

2020 single by IU featuring Suga

Single by IU featuring Suga
- Released: May 6, 2020
- Recorded: 2020
- Genre: K-pop; pop rock
- Length: 2:47
- Label: EDAM
- Songwriters: Lee Ji-eun; Min Yoon-gi; El Capitxn
- Producer: Suga

IU singles chronology
"Give You My Heart" (2020)	"Eight" (2020)	"Small Room" (2020)

Suga singles chronology
"Suga's Interlude" (2019)	"Eight" (2020)	"Blueberry Eyes" (2020)

Music video
- "Eight" on YouTube

"Eight" (Korean: 에잇; stylized in all lowercase) is a song recorded by South Korean singer-songwriter IU featuring South Korean rapper Suga of BTS. It was released as a digital single on May 6, 2020 by EDAM Entertainment. It is IU's first single following the release of her fifth EP Love Poem (2019). The song was written by IU, Suga, and El Capitxn and produced by Suga. Musically, "Eight" has been described as a "nostalgic" pop rock song with lyrics that find IU confessing as a twenty-eight year old, using a virtual figure and various analogies.

The song received generally positive reviews from music critics, who not only praised its lyrics and production, but also compared the song to the works of musicians such as Avicii, Zedd and Alessia Cara. Commercially, the single debuted at number one on the South Korean Gaon Digital Chart. It also entered the Billboard World Digital Song Sales chart at number one. The accompanying music video for "Eight" was directed by Kim Woogie (GDW) and features IU revisiting various phases of her youth through her memories.

== Background and release ==
On April 27, 2020, EDAM Entertainment announced that IU would release a new digital single on May 6, 2020, which would be a collaboration with Suga from BTS. The agency also reported that IU was involved in several aspects of the song, such as its composition and concept. It is IU's first single to be released after six months, following her fifth EP Love Poem in 2019. On April 28, the first teaser photo was revealed via the singer's official Twitter along with the song's name, "Eight". The teaser contains a close-up image with one hand and a white dress adorned with colorful accessories. A second teaser photo was released on IU's official SNS accounts on April 30. The photo shows the singer in a faded Medieval dress, staring outside the window anxiously with blank eyes. The style of the second teaser image is in contrast to the lighting, costumes and nail tips depicted in the first teaser. On May 2, a 17-second moving teaser of the song was released through IU's SNS account. It shows a round reel tape playing constantly and a snippet of the song's lyrics "So are you happy now" was heard towards the end of the teaser. On May 5, a 40-second music video teaser of the song was released through the YouTube channel, 1theK Originals. Set in a "futuristic" backdrop, it shows IU dressed in white, entering a laboratory and then laying down on an examination table. The song was released for streaming and digital download on May 6.

== Composition and production ==
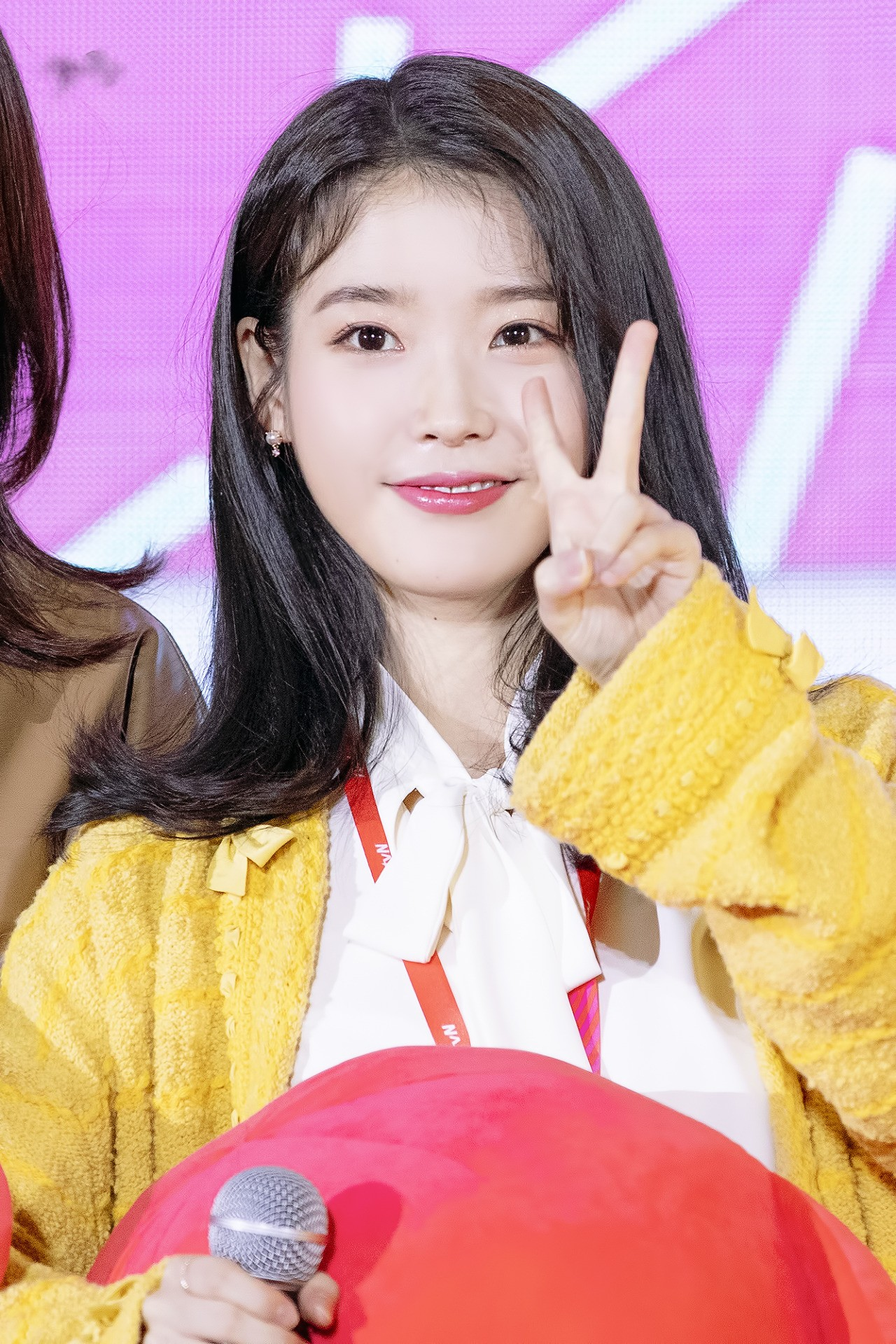
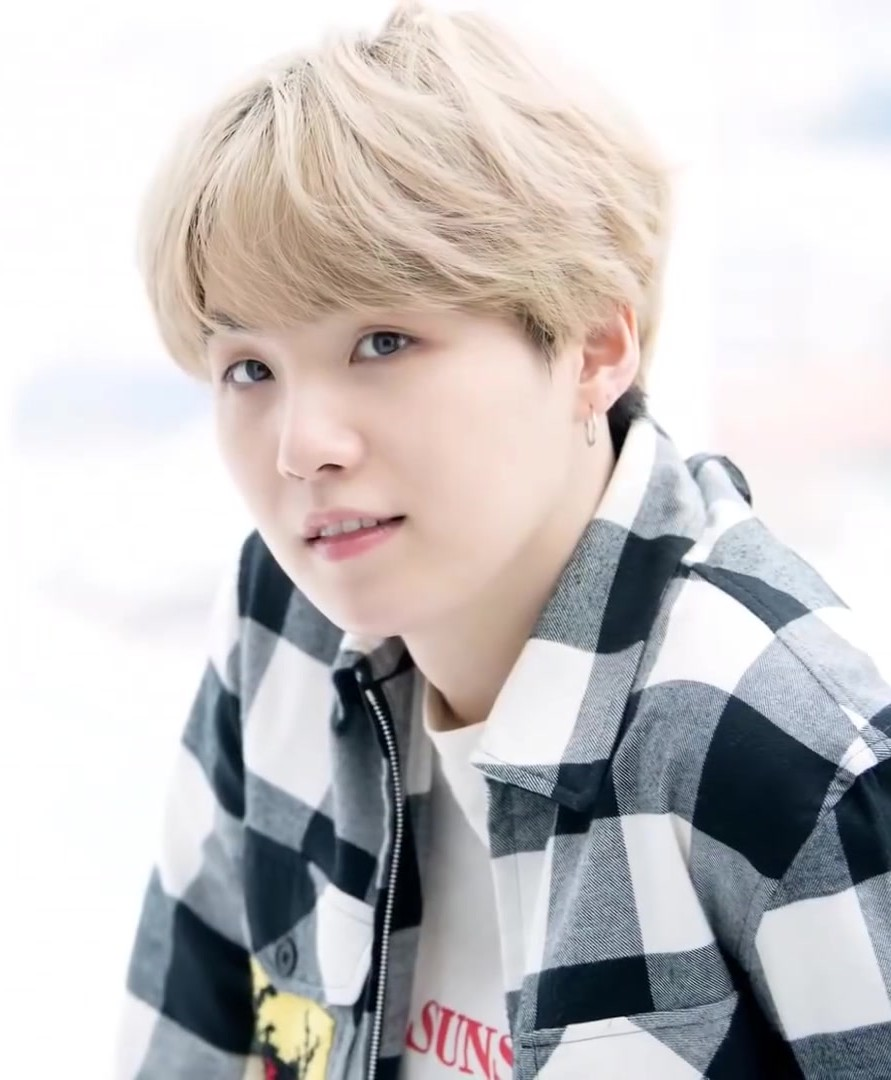
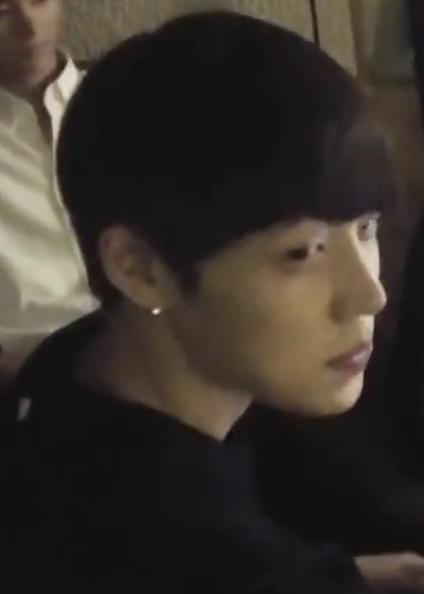
IU (top) wrote the song together with rapper Suga (middle) and producer El Capitxn (bottom). Suga also produced and featured on the track.

"Eight" was written and composed by IU and its producer Suga who also featured on the track. In an interview, IU said that she decided to work with Suga to deliver music that feels different from the music style that was previously presented to fans. Talking about the production process behind the song in a V Live broadcast, Suga stated that it was very smooth. He recalled, "There wasn’t a lot of back-and-forth. Shortly after I sent the (song’s) beats to her, she sent it back with the melody."

While I'm not sure whether it’s from my personal emotion or from the overall social atmosphere coming from the disaster, my 28 would be remembered by the recurring feeling of lethargy and longing for the 'orange island' where we felt freedom rather than sadness.

— IU talking about "Eight"

"Eight" follows IU's previous singles "Twenty-three" (2015) and "Palette" (2017) which together comprise her "coming-of-age" series. The song's title derives from the last digit of the Korean age "twenty-eight" of both singers. Musically, "Eight" has been described as pop rock song that fuses acoustic EDM and trendy rock sounds with "delicate and emotional" vocals and "soothing rapping". The song is composed in the key of C♯ major with a tempo of 120 beats per minute. It runs for two minutes and forty-seven seconds. It derives from piano and guitar instrumentation and incorporates Suga's characteristic "airy" synths in its production for which the song invokes "feel-good" and "nostalgic" vibes. According to IU, the lyrics are a confession of a twenty-eight year old "using a virtual figure and various metaphors". It has a theme of "self-reflection." Teen Vogue's Sara Delgado described "Eight" as "a narration between two characters in soliloquy form" that "dwells on memories and past encounters" and felt that the various analogies in the song are used "to transmit a sense of longing, all through the lens of youth and loss."

== Critical reception ==
Reviewing for IZM, Hwang Sun-up gave the song a positive review, praising the lyrics and production and likened its musical direction to Avicii's "Wake Me Up" and Zedd and Alessia Cara's "Stay".

== Commercial performance ==
"Eight" debuted at number one on the week 19 issue of South Korea's Gaon Digital Chart for the period dated May 3–9, 2020. The song also took first place on the component Download chart for the same period, and entered the Streaming chart at number two, peaking at number one the following week on the chart issue for the period dated May 10–16. It topped the monthly digital charts for both May and June. In the United States, with only two days of activity counted—the song was released on a Wednesday, just before the end of the weekly tracking period—"Eight" debuted atop the Billboard World Digital Song Sales chart issue dated May 16, becoming both IU and Suga's (as a solo artist) first number one on the ranking. The song sold 6,965 copies and entered the US Digital Songs chart at number 13, making it one of the highest-charting Korean-language songs in the chart's history. In the United Kingdom, the song entered the OCC's Singles Downloads component chart at number 42.

Six months after its release, "Eight" was certified Platinum by the Korea Music Content Association (KMCA) on November 12, 2020, for surpassing 100 million domestic streams. It ended 2020 as the sixth most-downloaded and streamed song in South Korea, and was the sixth best-performing digital single overall.

== Music video ==
The song's accompanying music video premiered simultaneously with the release of the single. Directed by Kim Woogie (GDW), its synopsis follows IU as the protagonist, "growing out of her youth". The video opens with IU walking into a futuristic sci-fi room. She activates a mysterious machine and lies on a stretcher. She then goes back to various phases of her life through her memories. The video alternates between 3D and 2D animated scenes and live-action clips of her travelling to different worlds. There are scenes where she strolls through a house, and in others she treasures a gecko in different forms of herself. The video ends with her waking up from her trance.

== Accolades ==
Awards and nominations for "Eight"
Year	Organization	Award	Result	Ref.
2020	JOOX Hong Kong Top Music Awards	Top 20 Kpop songs	Won	
2020	Melon Music Awards	Best Rock Track	Won	
2020	Melon Music Awards	Song of the Year	Nominated	
2020	Mnet Asian Music Awards	Best Collaboration	Won	
2020	Mnet Asian Music Awards	Song of the Year	Nominated	
2021	Gaon Chart Music Awards	Song of the Year – May	Won	
2021	Korean Music Awards	Best Pop Song	Nominated	

Music program awards
Program	Date	Ref.
Inkigayo	May 17, 2020	
Inkigayo	May 24, 2020	
Inkigayo	May 31, 2020	

== Credits and personnel ==
Credits adapted from Melon.

- IU – lead vocals, songwriting, arrangement, chorus
- Suga – featured vocals, production, songwriting, arrangement, piano, synthesizer
- El Capitxn – songwriting, arrangement, piano, synthesizer
- Jukjae – guitar
- Vendors (Zenur) – guitar
- Choi In-sung – bass
- Song Myung-gab – recording
- Kang Sun-young – engineering
- Gu Jong-pil – mixing
- Kwon Nam-woo – mastering

== Charts ==
=== Weekly charts ===
Weekly chart performance
Chart (2020)	Peak position
Canadian Digital Song Sales (Billboard)	27
Hungary (Single Top 40)	12
Japan Hot 100 (Billboard)	25
Malaysia (RIM)	1
New Zealand Hot Singles (RMNZ)	14
Scottish Singles Sales (Official Charts)	44
Singapore (RIAS)	1
South Korea (Gaon)	1
South Korea (K-pop Hot 100)	1
US Digital Song Sales (Billboard)	13
US World Digital Song Sales (Billboard)	1

=== Monthly charts ===
Monthly chart performance
Chart (May–June 2020)	Position
South Korea (Gaon)	1

=== Year-end charts ===
Year-end chart performance
Chart (2020)	Position
South Korea (Gaon)	6
Chart (2021)	Position
South Korea (Gaon)	22
Chart (2022)	Position
South Korea (Circle)	142

== Certifications ==
Certifications
Region	Certification	Certified units/sales
Streaming
Japan (RIAJ)	Gold	50,000,000^{†}
South Korea (KMCA)	2× Platinum	200,000,000^{†}
^{†} Streaming-only figures based on certification alone.

== Release history ==
Release formats for "Eight"
Region	Date	Format	Label	Ref.
Various	May 6, 2020	Digital download; streaming	EDAM	

== See also ==
- List of Gaon Digital Chart number ones of 2020
- List of K-pop Hot 100 number ones
- List of number-one songs of 2020 (Malaysia)
- List of number-one songs of 2020 (Singapore)
