= 2017 Melon Music Awards =

2017 South Korean music award ceremony

- Date: December 2, 2017
- Location: Gocheok Sky Dome, Seoul, South Korea
- Most awards: BTS & Exo (4)
- Website: www.melon.com/mma/index.htm

Television/radio coverage
- Network: JTBC2; JTBC4; 1theK; KakaoTV; Daum; Melon
- Runtime: 240 minutes

The 2017 Melon Music Awards ceremony, organized by kakao M (a kakao company) through its online music store, Melon, took place on December 2, 2017, at the Gocheok Sky Dome in Seoul, South Korea. This was the ninth ceremony in the show's history.

== Performers and presenters ==
The following individuals and groups, listed in order of appearance, presented awards or performed musical numbers.

=== Performers ===
Name(s)	Performance(s)
Winner	"Love Me Love Me" + "Really Really"
Hong Jin Young, Kim Young Chul	"Ring Ring"
GFriend	"Summer Rain" + "Love Whisper"
JBJ	"Intro" + "Fantasy"
Red Velvet	"Peek-A-Boo" + "Red Flavor"
Bolbbalgan4	"Some" + "Galaxy"
MeloMance	"Gift"
Wanna One	"Nothing Without You" + "Beautiful" + "Burn It Up"
Hyuna	"Intro" + "Lip & Hip"
IU	"Through The Night" + "Dear Name"
Park Hyo Shin	"I Am A Dreamer"
Twice	"Knock Knock" + "Likey"
BTS	"Intro" + "DNA" + "You Never Walk Alone" + "Spring Day"
EXO	"Intro" + "Forever" + "The Eve" + "Ko Ko Bop"

=== Presenters ===
Name(s)	Notes
Yeo Jin-goo	Presenter for Top 10 Artists (Twice and Bolbbalgan4)
Tony An	Presenter for Best New Artist
Hong Jong-hyun and Han Eun-jung	Presenter for Top 10 Artists (BTS and Exo)
Bae Jung-nam and Sim So-young	Presenter for Best Indie and Best R&B/Soul
Kang Han-na	Presenter for Top 10 Artists (Heize and IU)
Jung Sung-ho and Hong Yun-hwa	Presenter for Best Folk/Blues and Best Trot
Kim Jun-hyun and Seol In-ah	Presenter for MBC Music Star Award and Best Rap/Hip Hop
Daniel Lindemann, Alberto Mondi and Guillaume Patry	Presenter for Kakao Hot Star Award
Baek Ji-young and Yoo Jae-hwan	Presenter for Best Songwriter Award and Hot Trend Award
Ahn Hyo-seop, Kang Seung-hyun and Na Ha-eun	Presenter for Best of Dance Performance
Kai and Park Ha-na	Presenter for Top 10 Artists (Red Velvet and Winner)
Kim Poong and Park Kyung-lim	Presenter for Best OST and Best Music Video
Kim So-hyun	Presenter for Top 10 Artists (Wanna One) and Stage of the Year
Song Jae-rim and Jang Shin-young	Presenter for 1theK Performance Award and Netizen Popularity Award
Han Hyun-min	Presenter for Global Artist
Song Seung-heon	Presenter for Album of the Year
Eugene	Presenter for Song of the Year
Jung Woo-sung	Presenter for Artist of the Year

== Judging criteria ==
Division	Online Voting	Digital Sales	Judge Score
Main Awards*	20%	60%	20%
Genre Awards**	30%	40%	30%
Popularity Awards***	60%	40%	–
Special Awards****	–	–	100%
*Artist of the Year, Song of the Year, Album of the Year, New Artist; **Ballad, Dance, Rap/Hip Hop, R&B/Soul, Indie, Rock, Trot, Folk/Blues, Pop, OST; ***Netizen Choice Award, Hot Trend Award; ****Music Video Award, Song Writer Award, MBC Music Star Award, Kakao Hot Star Award, 1TheK Performance Award, Global Artist Award

== Winners and nominees ==
Only artists who released music between November 20, 2016, and October 25, 2017, were eligible, and the nominees were selected by calculating the number of downloads, streams, and weekly Melon Popularity Award votes achieved by each artist.

Winners are listed first and highlighted in boldface. Voting for Top 10 Artists took place on the Melon Music website from October 26 through November 12, 2017. Voting for Category awards took place from November 13 through December 1, 2017.

=== Voted Awards ===
Top 10 Artists (Bonsang)	Song of the Year (Daesang)
**Zico**; **Exo**; **Red Velvet**; **Twice**; **Wanna One**; **Winner**; **BTS**; **Bolbbalgan4**; **IU**; **Heize**; List of nominated artists: Ailee; Akdong Musician; Apink; Blackpink; BtoB; Chanyeol; Crush; Ed Sheeran; G-Dragon; GFriend; Hangzoo; Highlight; Hyukoh; Hwang Chi-yeul; Jung Seung-hwan; Mad Clown; Mamamoo; Nucksal; Punch; Psy; Sechs Kies; Seventeen; Soyou; Suran; Taeyeon; 20 Years of Age; Woo Won-jae; Yoon Jong-shin; Zico; Zion.T	**BTS – "Spring Day"**; IU – "Through The Night"; Exo – "Ko Ko Bop"; Bolbbalgan4 – "Tell Me You Love Me"; Ailee – "I Will Go to You Like the First Snow"
Artist of the Year (Daesang)	Album of the Year (Daesang)
**Exo**; IU; BTS; Bolbbalgan4; Heize	**IU – Palette**; Exo – The War; BTS – You Never Walk Alone; Psy – 4X2=8; Big Bang – Made
Best New Artist	Best Dance Award (Male)
**Wanna One**; Kard; Pristin; Woo Won-jae; Chungha; Dreamcatcher	**Exo – "Ko Ko Bop"**; Winner – "Really Really"; BTS – "DNA"; Psy – "New Face"; Highlight – "Plz Don't Be Sad"
Best Dance Award (Female)	Best Folk/Blues Award
**Twice – "Knock Knock"**; Blackpink – "As If It's Your Last"; Red Velvet – "Red Flavor"; Mamamoo – "Yes I Am"; Sunmi – "Gashina"	**Jung Eun-ji – "The Spring" (featuring Harim)**; 10cm – "Phoncert"; Akdong Musician – "Last Goodbye"; Yoon Ddan Ddan – "The Night I Miss You"; Cao Lu, Kisum, and Yerin – "Spring Again"
Best R&B/Soul Award	Best Rap/Hip Hop Award
**Suran – "Wine" (featuring Changmo)**; G-Dragon – "Untitled, 2014"; Zion.T – "The Song"; Sistar – "Lonely"; Zico – "She's A Baby"	**Dynamic Duo and Chen – "Nosedive"**; Nucksal, Hanhae, Rhino, and Jo Woo-chan – "1/N" (featuring Dynamic Duo); Mad Clown – "Lost Without You" (featuring Bolbbalgan4); Woo Won-jae – "We Are" (featuring Loco and Gray); Zico – "Bermuda Triangle" (featuring Crush and Dean)
Best Indie Award	Best Rock Award
**MeloMance – "Gift"**; Cheeze – "Love You (bye)"; Vanilla Acoustic – "Only Think Of You"; Standing Egg – "You've Come To Think Of It"; Jung Joon Il – "Wish"	**Heechul and Min Kyung-hoon – "Sweet Dream"**; Buzz – "The Love"; Day6 – "You Were Beautiful"; F.T. Island – "Wind"; Hyukoh – "Tomboy"
Best Trot Award	Best OST Award
**Hong Jin-young – "Ring Ring" (Composer Ver.)**; Kim Yeon Ja, Dia and Hong Jin-young – "You Are My Flower"; Na Hoon-a – "The Man's Life Story"; Jang Yun-jeong – "Cherry Blossom Road 2017"; Choi Won Young – "I'm Coming"	**Ailee – "I Will Go To You Like The First Snow (Guardian: The Lonely and Great God)"**; Bolbbalgan4 – "You And Me From The Start" (The Emperor: Owner of the Mask); Kassy – "Good Morning" (Fight for My Way); Sung Si Kyung – "Somewhere Someday" (The Legend of the Blue Sea); V and Jin – "It's Definitely You" (Hwarang: The Poet Warrior Youth)
Best Pop Award	Best Ballad Award
**Ed Sheeran – "Shape of You"**; The Chainsmokers, Coldplay – "Something Just Like This"; Charlie Puth – "Attention"; Maroon 5 – "Don't Wanna Know" (featuring Kendrick Lamar); Zedd and Alessia Cara – "Stay"	**Yoon Jong-shin – "Like It"**; Hwang Chi-yeul – "A Daily Song"; Jungkey – "Anymore" (featuring Wheein); Jung Seung Hwan – "The Fool"; Taeyeon – "Fine"
Netizen Popularity Award	Hot Trend Award
**Exo**; Big Bang; BtoB; BTS; Highlight; Hwang Chi-yeul; Mamamoo; Twice; Wanna One; Winner	**Suran – "Wine" (featuring Changmo)**; Girls Next Door – "Deep Blue Eyes"; I.O.I – "Downpour"; Kim Sejeong – "Flower Way"; Taeil, Kim Sejeong – "I Like You, I Don't"

=== Other awards ===
Nominees	Winners
Best Music Video Award	BTS – "DNA"
Stage of the Year	Park Hyo Shin
Best Songwriter Award	IU
MBC Music Star Award	Hyuna
Global Artist Award	BTS
Kakao Hot Star	Wanna One
1theK Performance Award	GFriend

== Gallery ==
2017 Melon Music Awards gallery
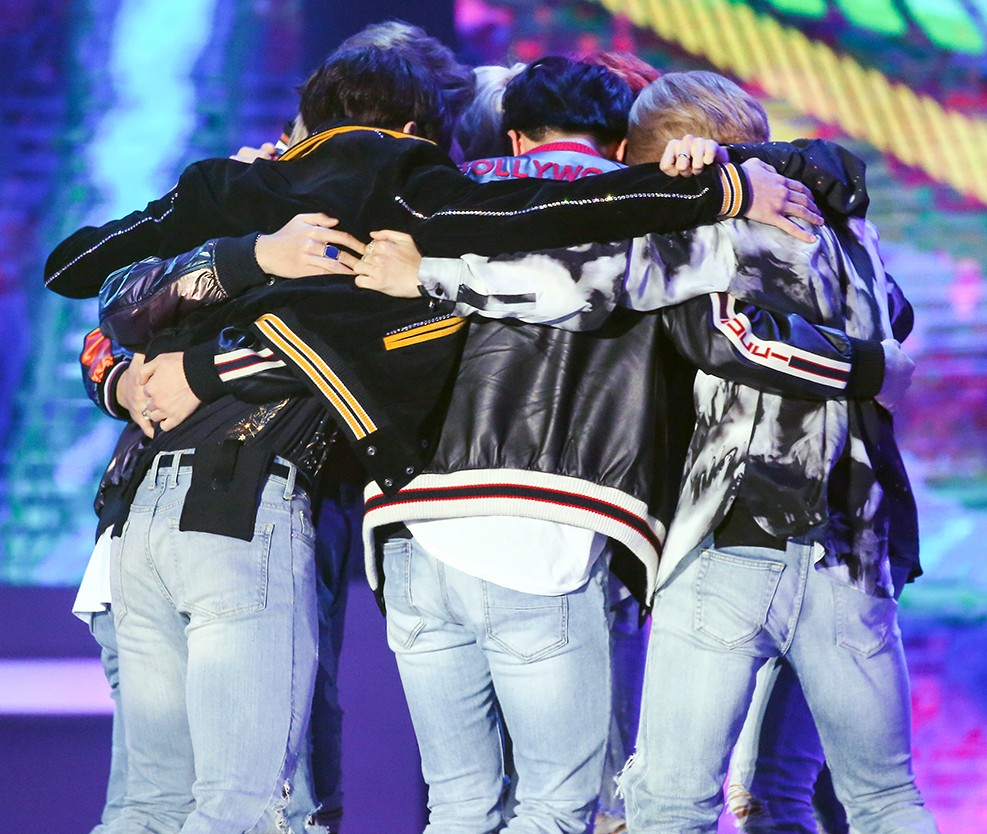
BTS after winning Song of the Year

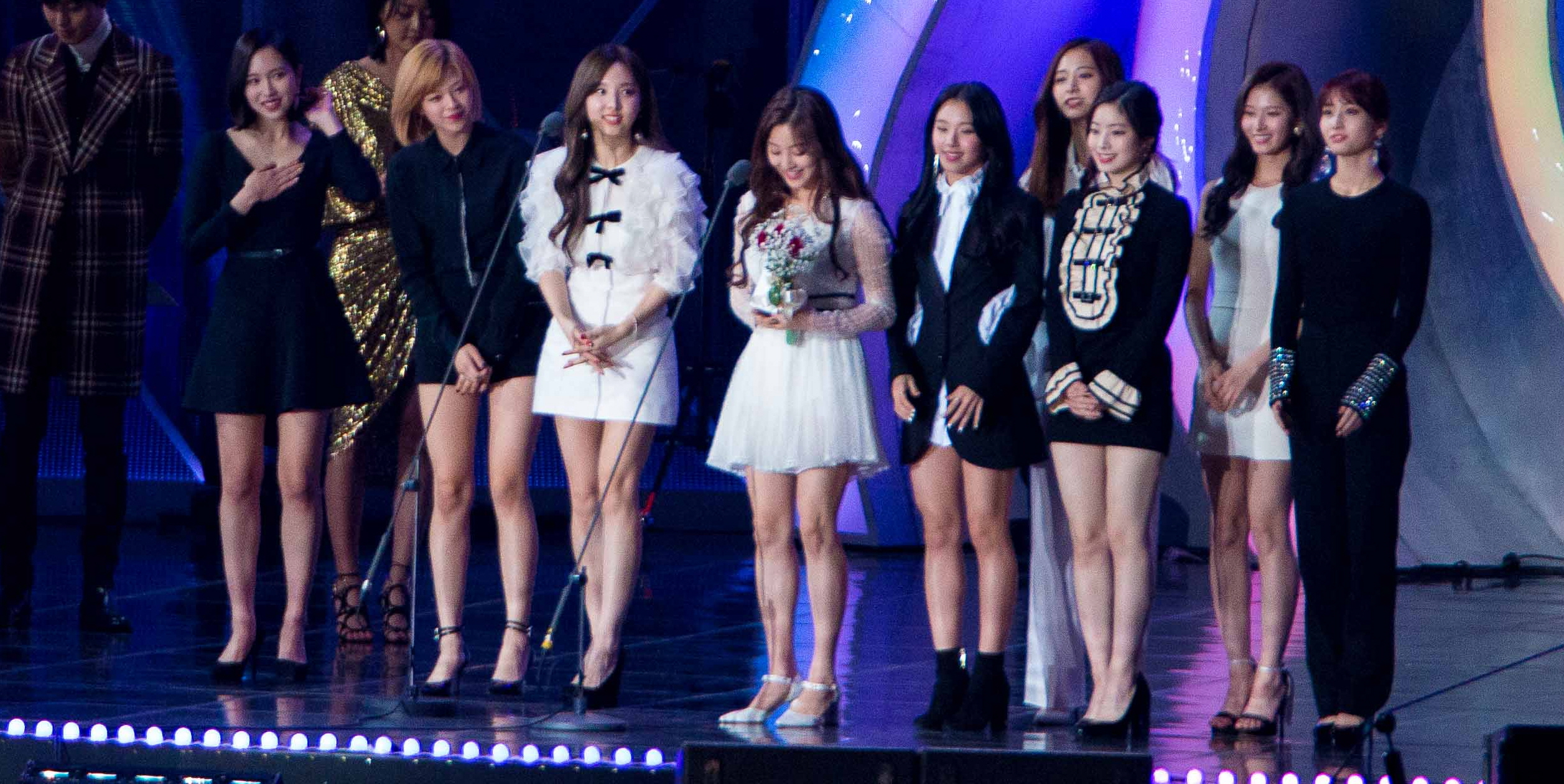
Twice after winning Best Dance Performance

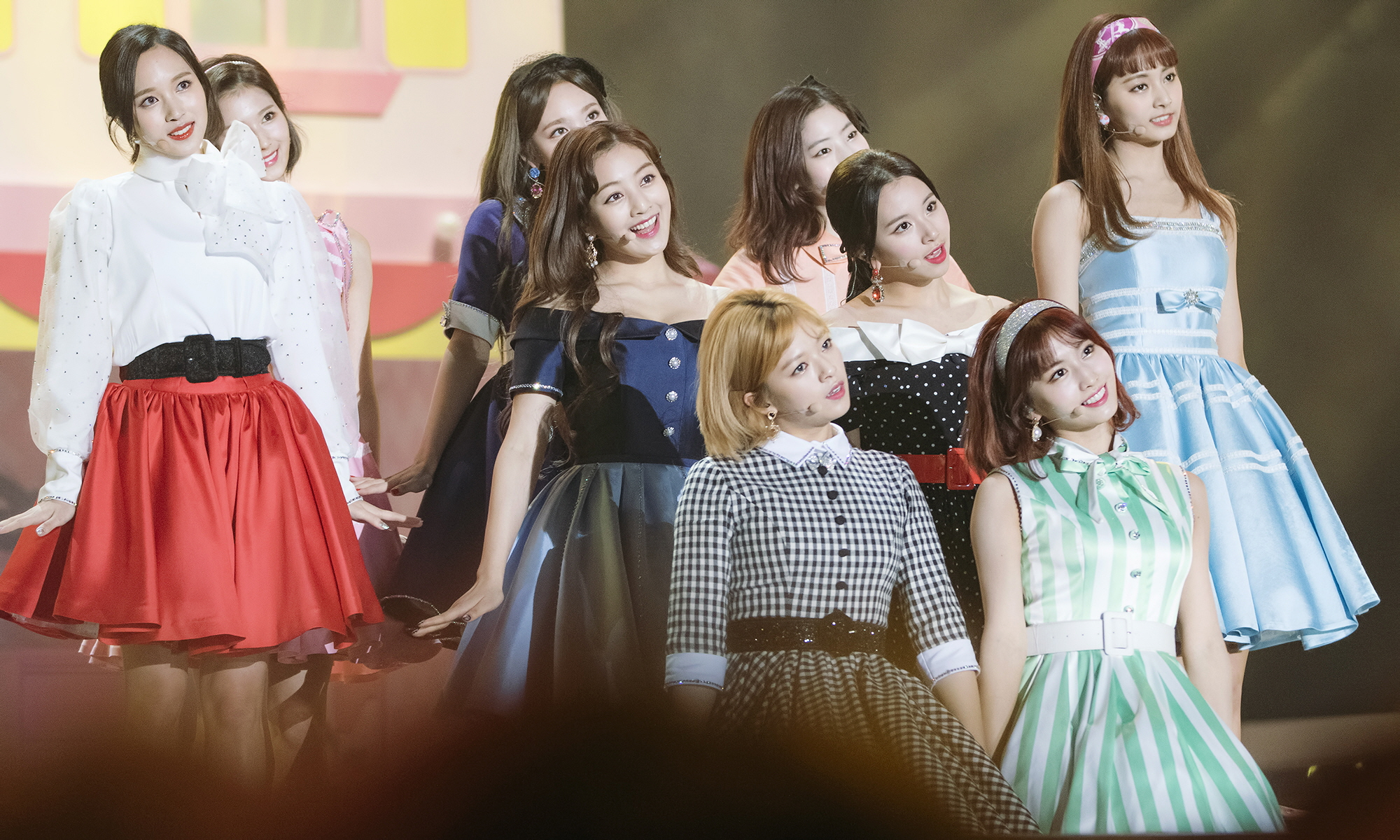
Twice performing "Knock Knock"

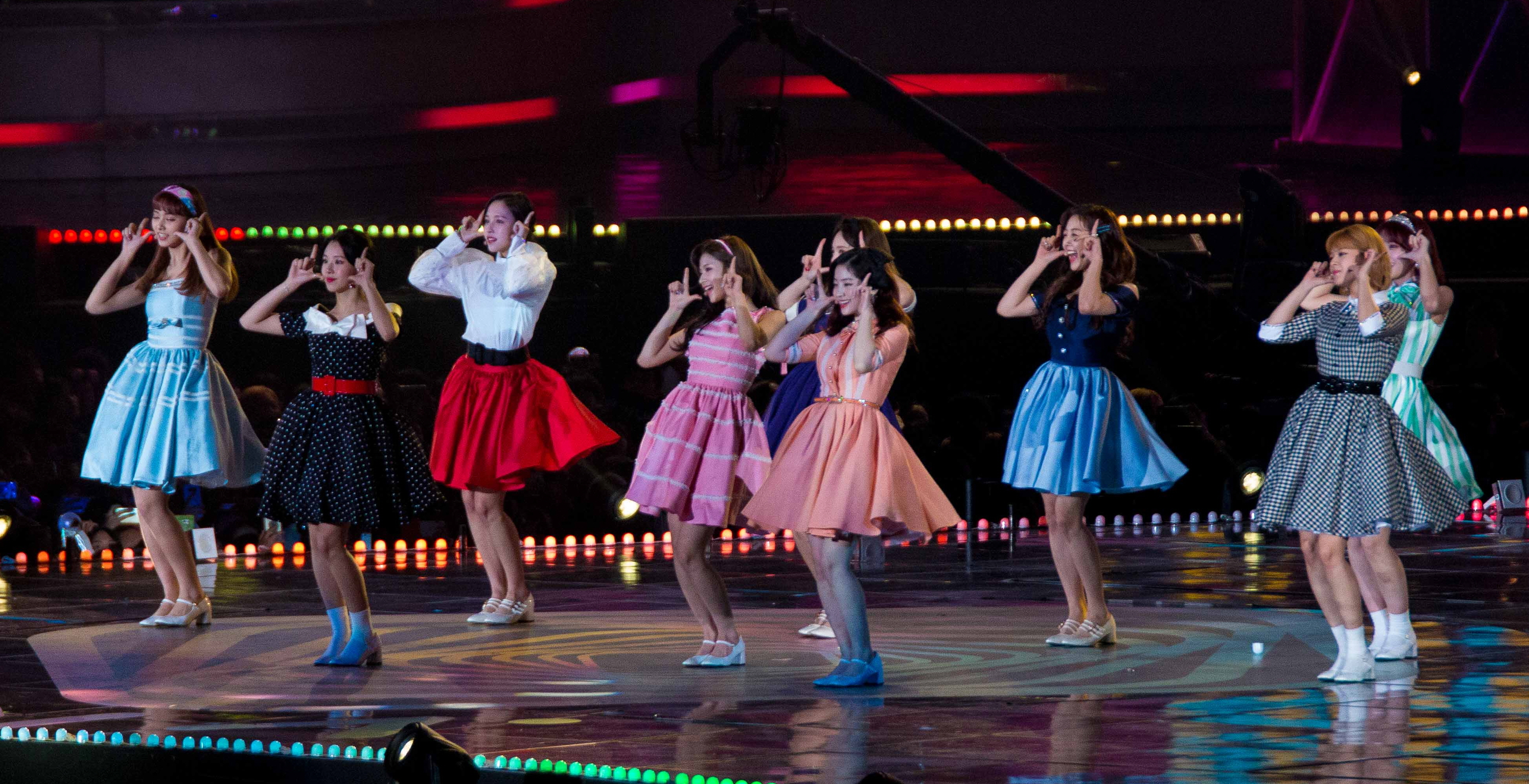
Twice performing "Likey"

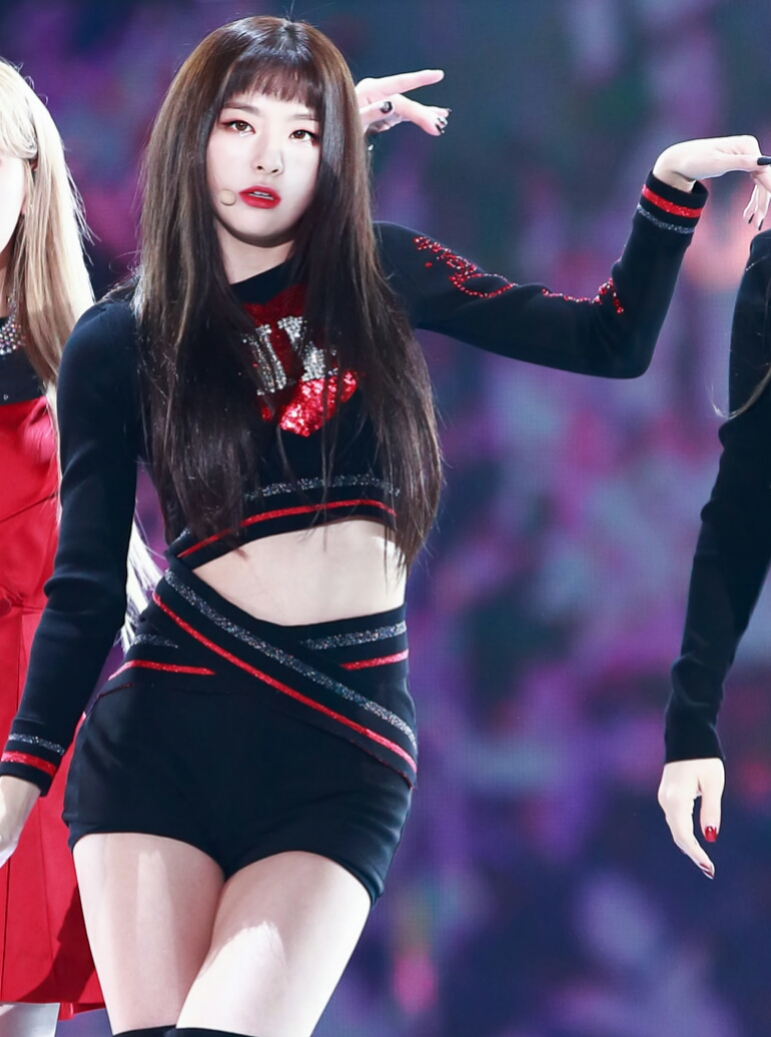
Red Velvet's Seulgi

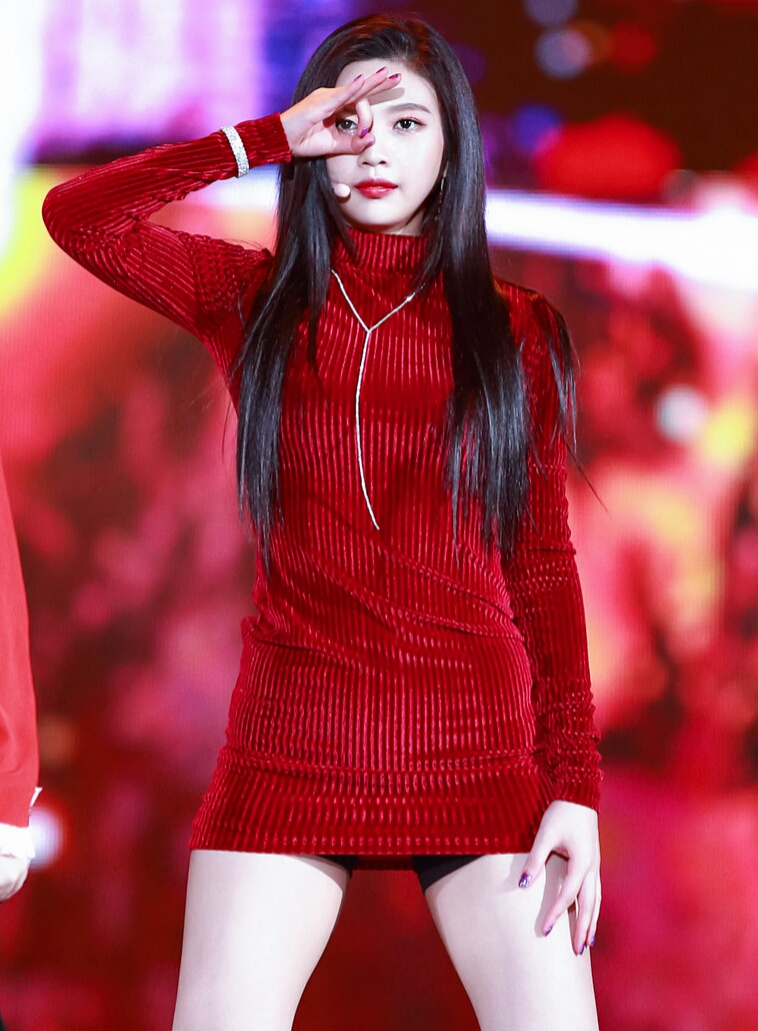
Red Velvet's Joy performing "Peek-a-Boo"

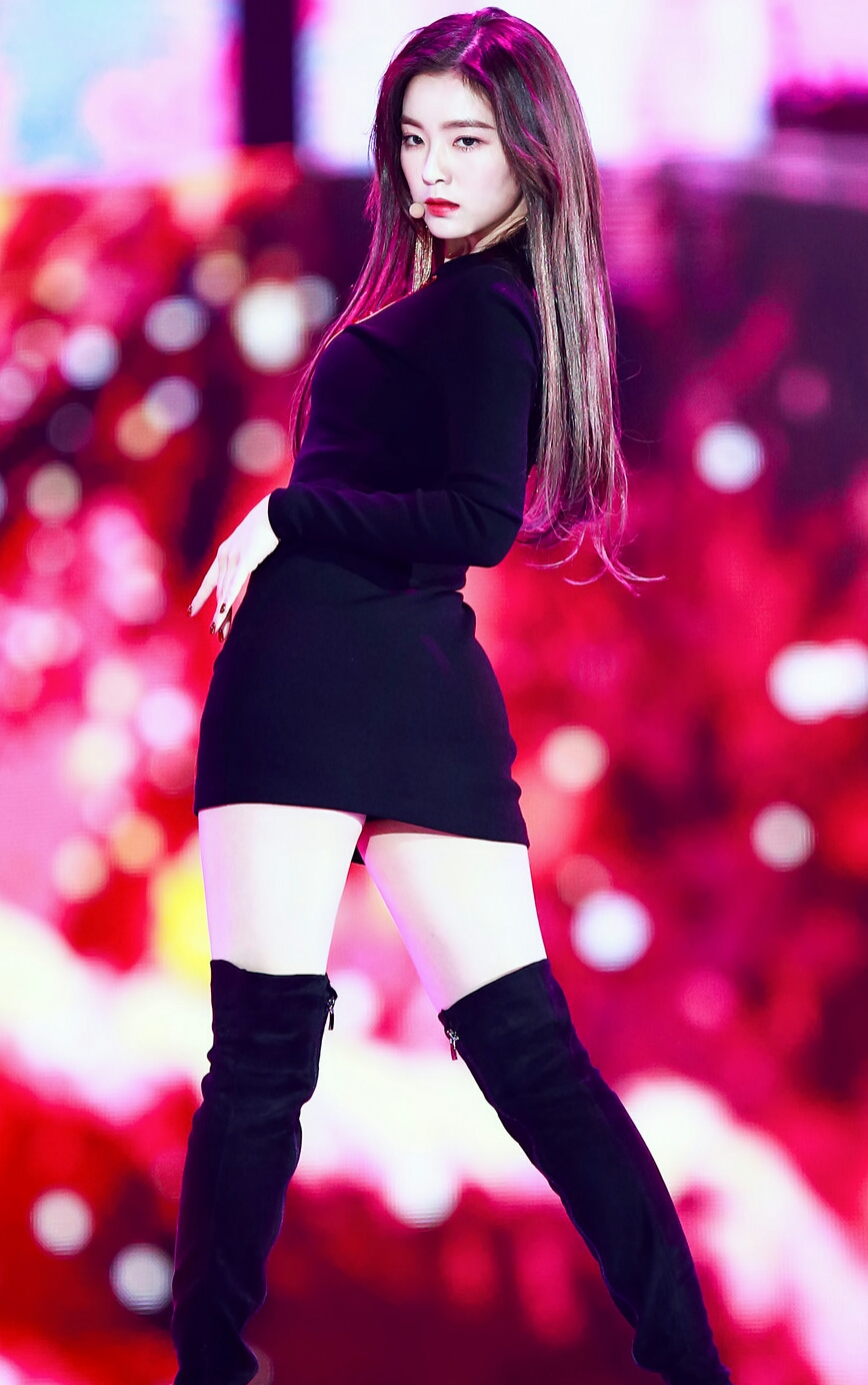
Red Velvet's Irene performing "Peek-a-Boo"

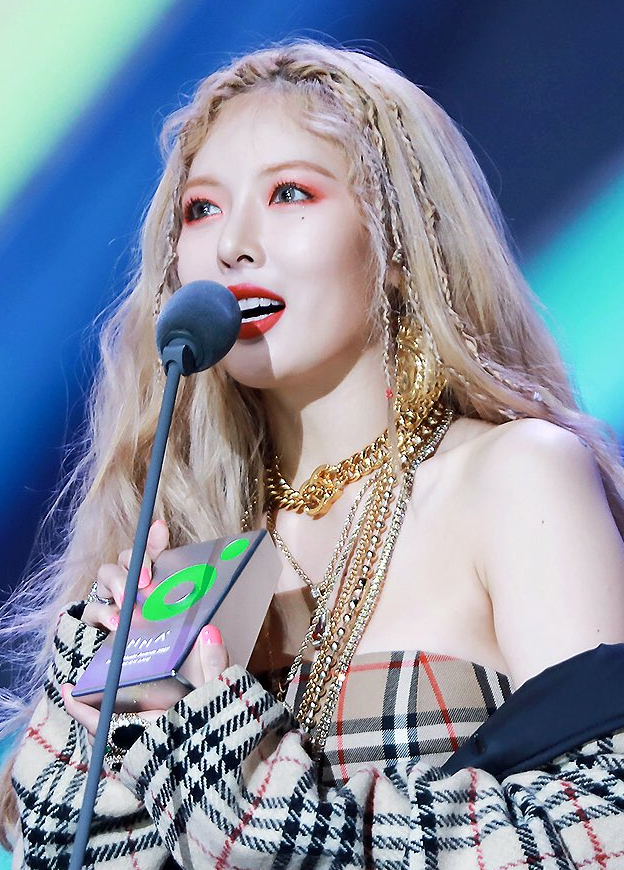
Hyuna after winning MBC Music Star Award

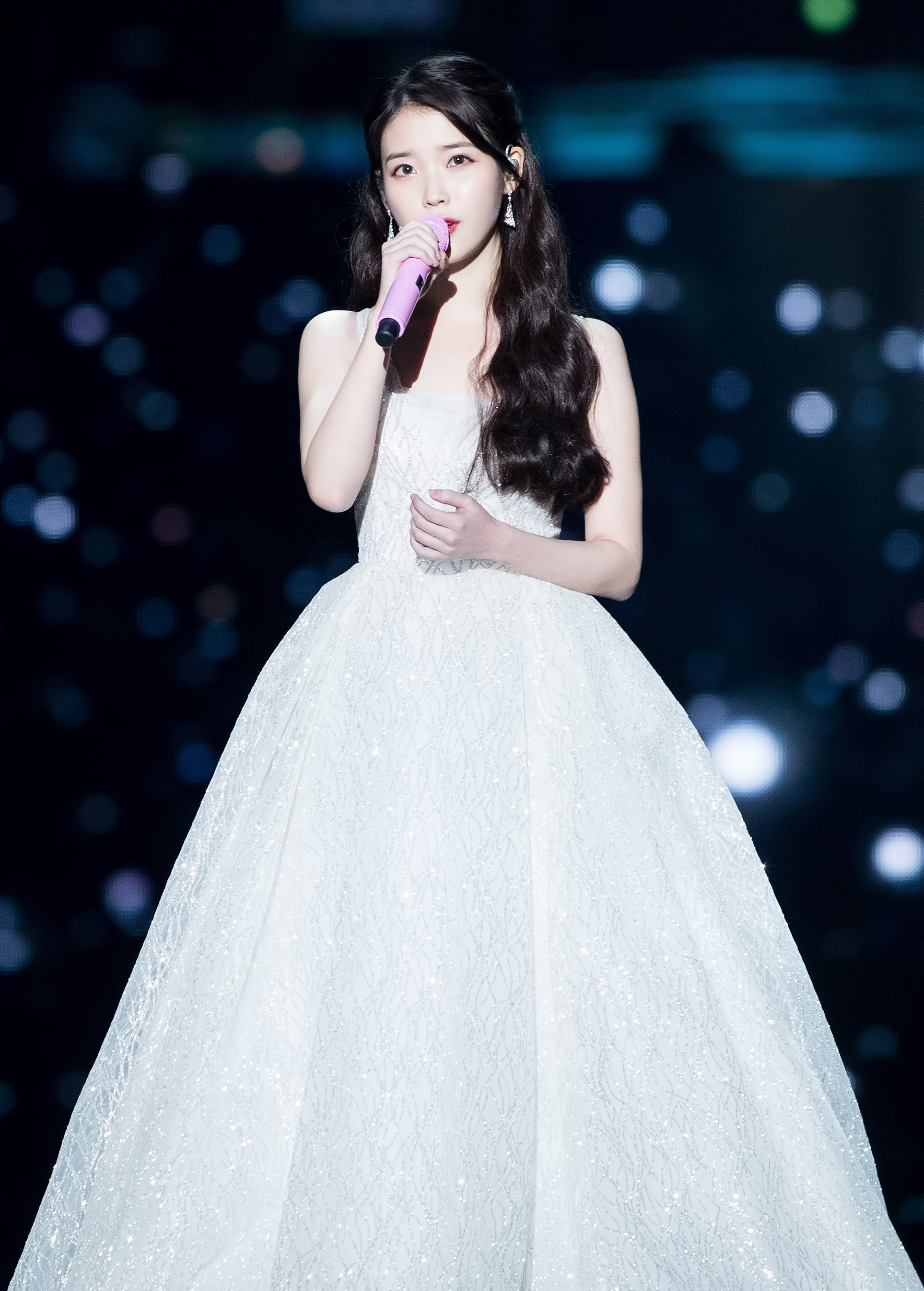
IU

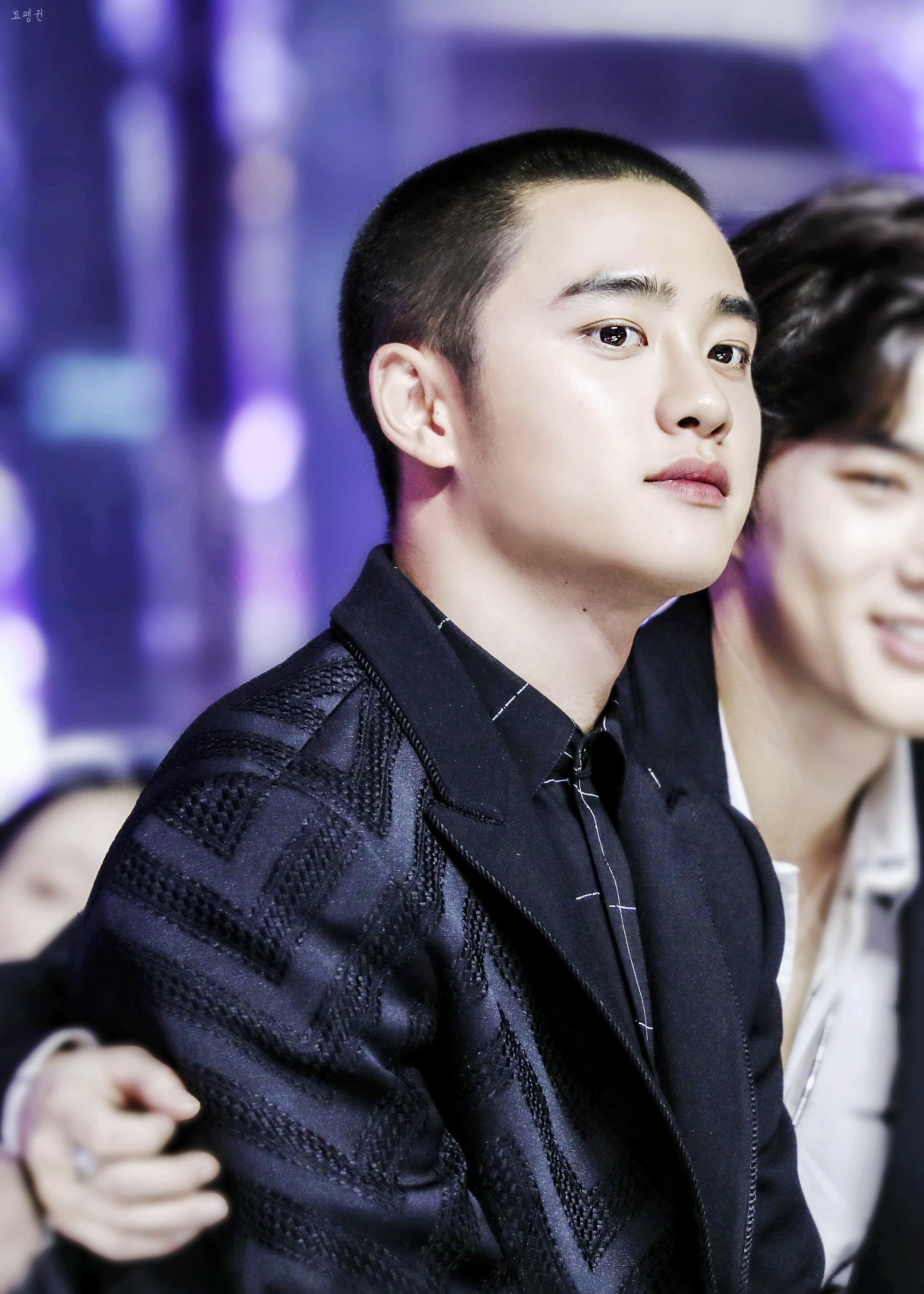
Exo's D.O.

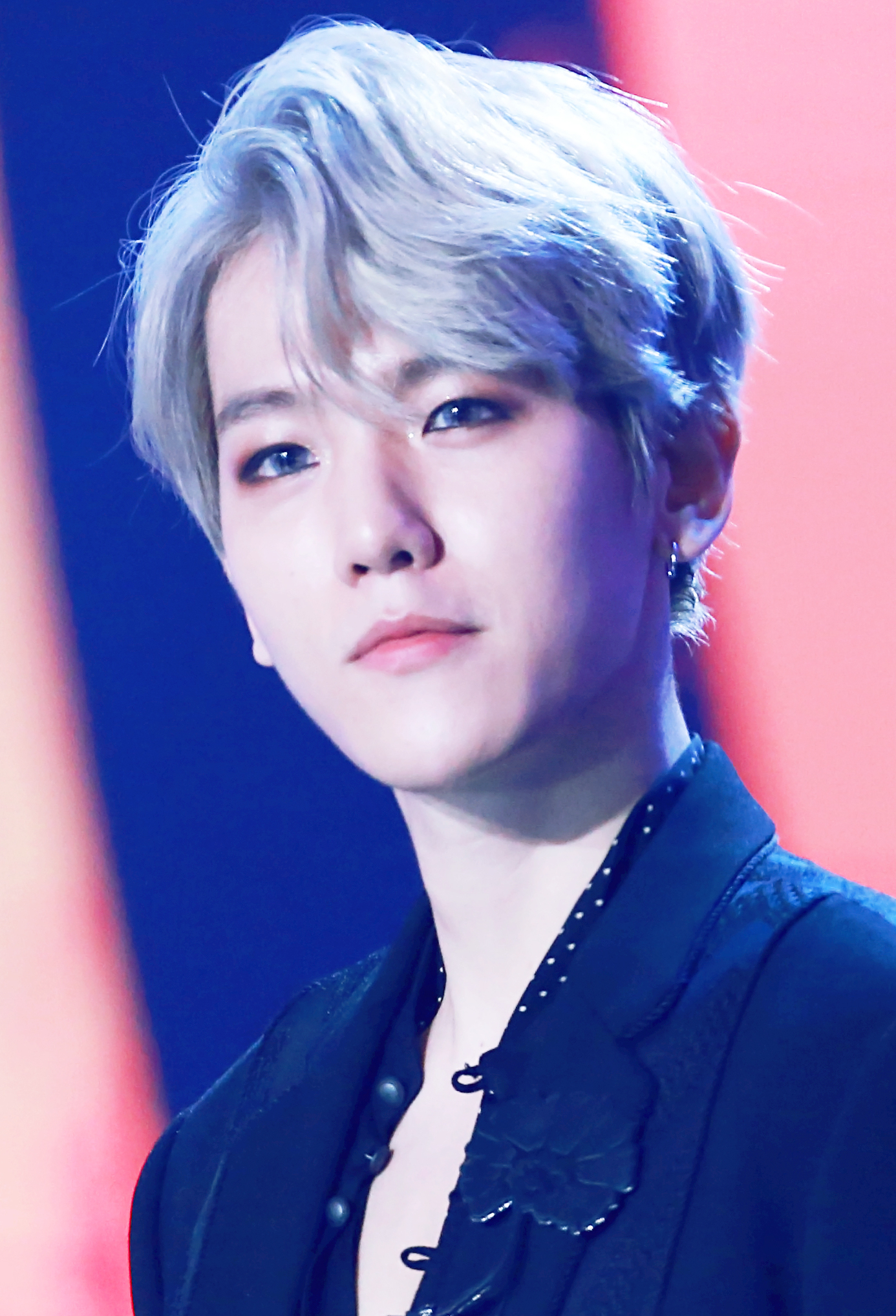
Exo's Baekhyun

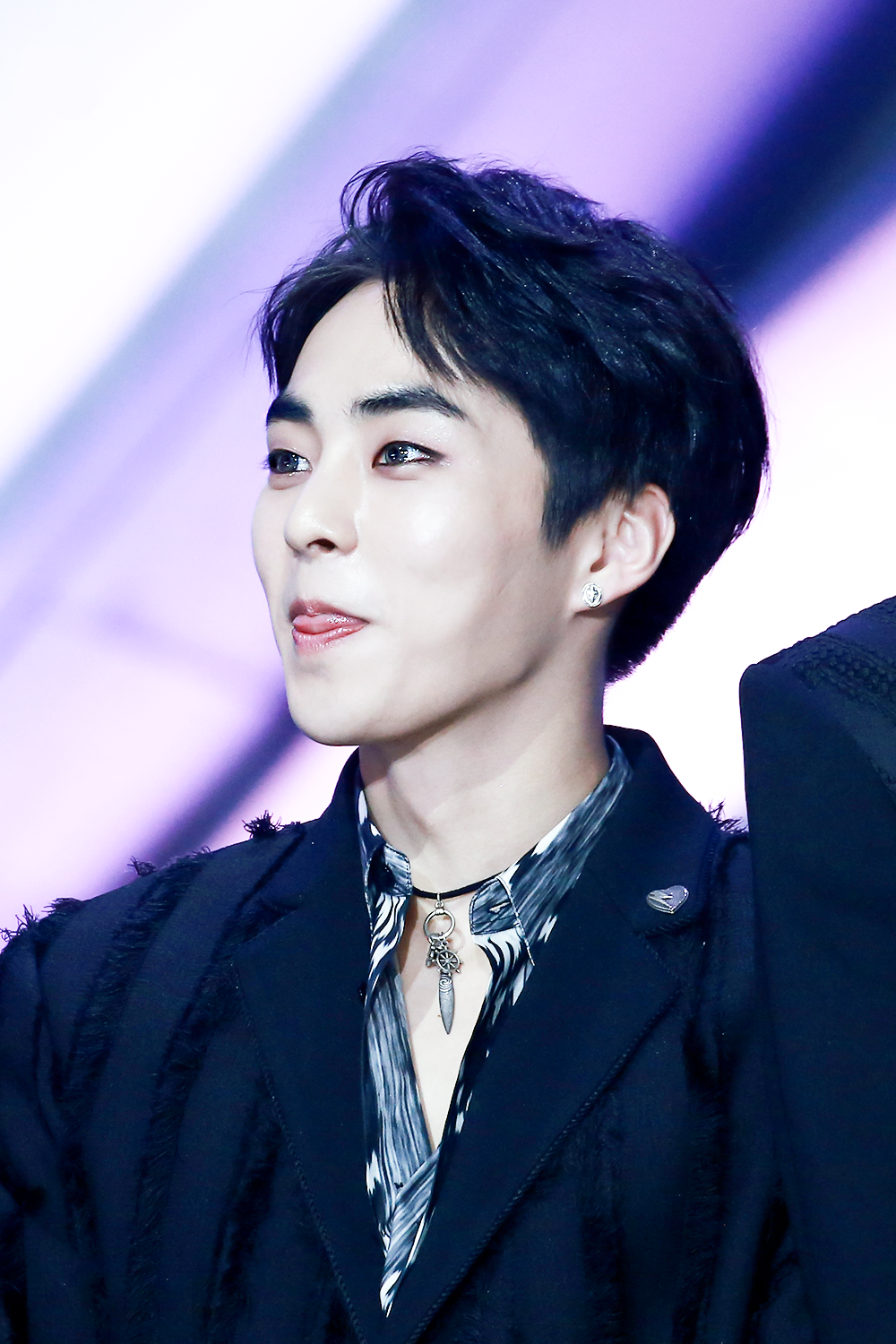
Exo's Xiumin

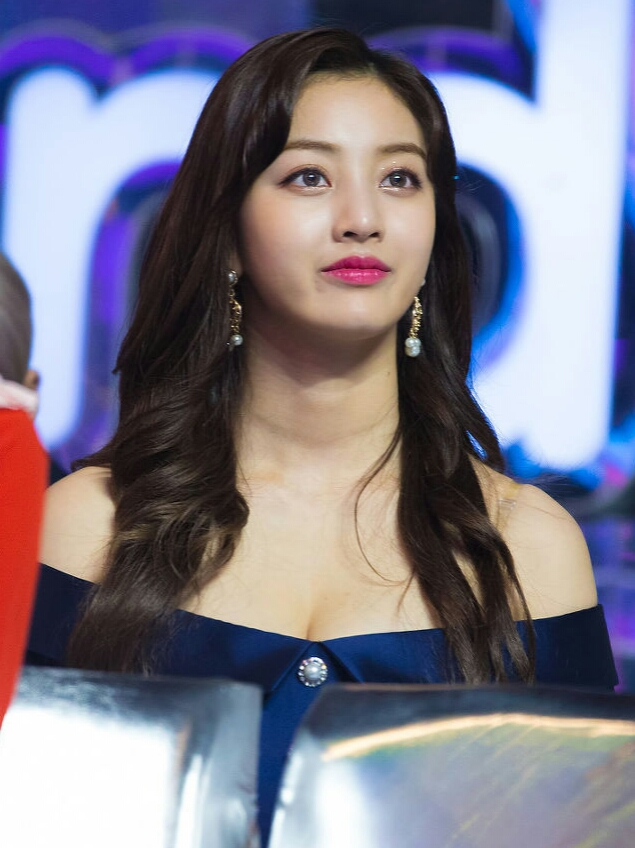
Twice's Jihyo

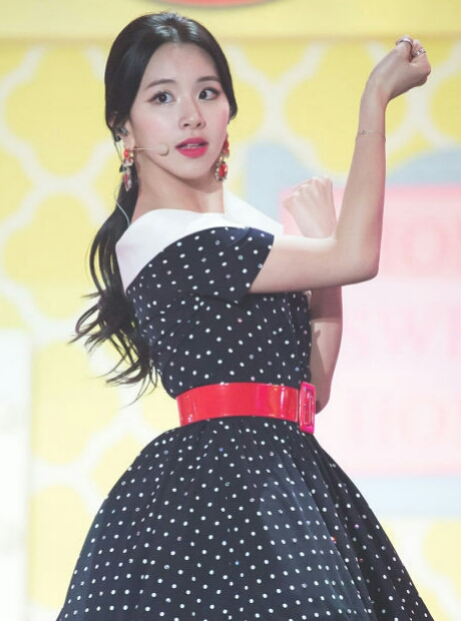
Twice's Chaeyoung

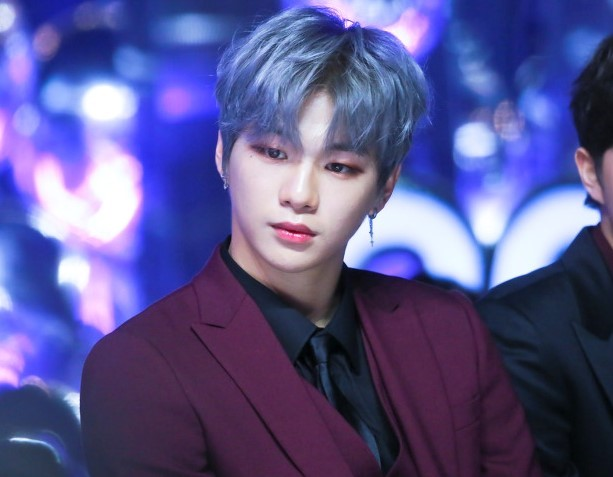
Wanna One's Kang Daniel

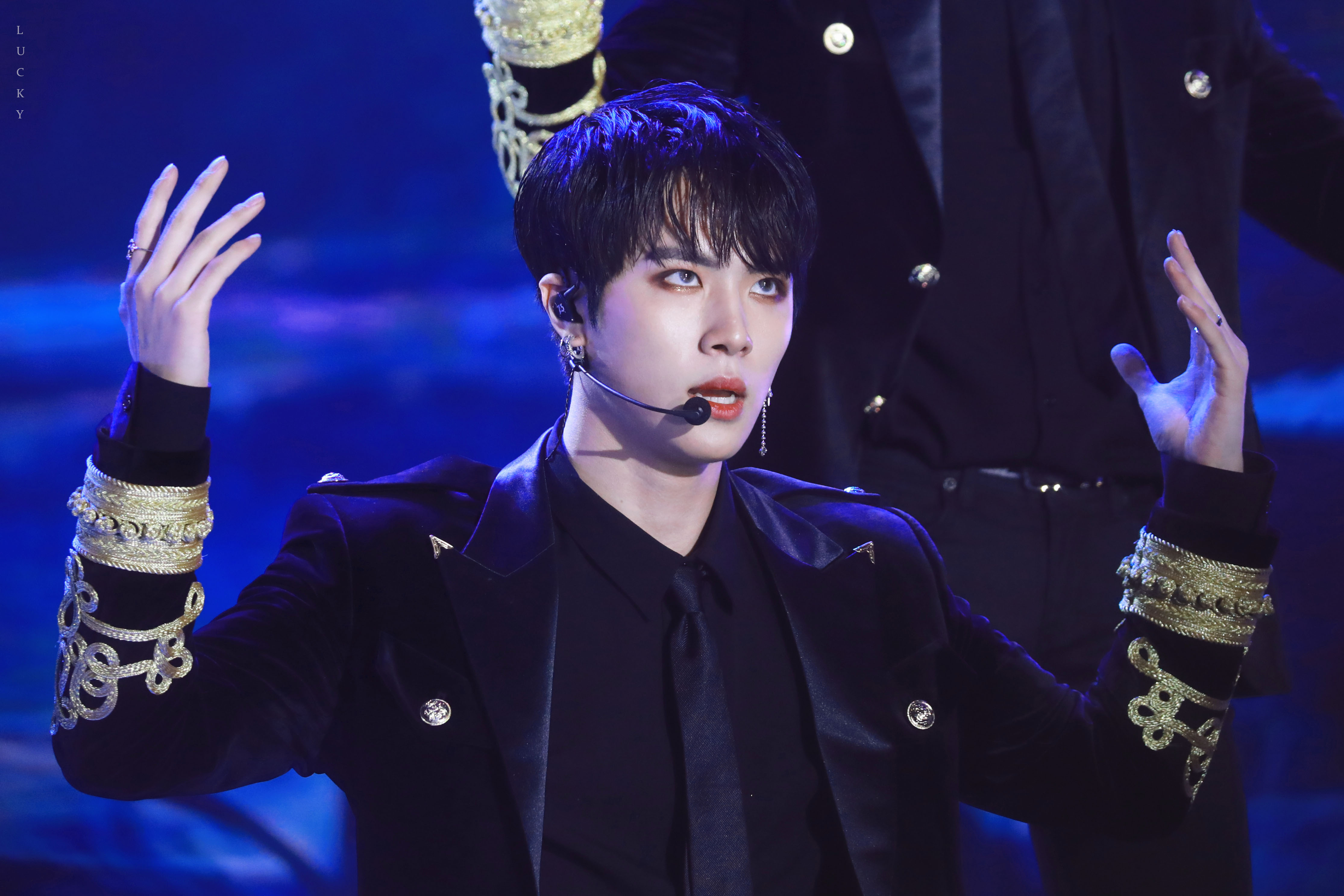
Kim Dong-han
