= Can't Love You Anymore =

Single by IU and Oh Hyuk

from the album Palette
- Released: April 7, 2017
- Genre: Pop; R&B
- Length: 3:15
- Label: Fave
- Composers: IU; Oh Hyuk; Lee Jong-hoon
- Lyricists: IU; Oh Hyuk
- Producer: Lee Jong-hoon

IU and Oh Hyuk singles chronology
"Through the Night" (2017)	"Can't Love You Anymore" (2017)	"Palette" (2017)

Oh Hyuk singles chronology
"Masitnonsoul" (2016)	"Can't Love You Anymore" (2017)	"Momom" (2018)

Live video
- "Can't Love You Anymore" on YouTube

"Can't Love You Anymore" (Korean: 사랑이 잘; RR: Sarangi jal) is a song recorded by South Korean singer IU and Hyukoh member Oh Hyuk for IU's fourth studio album Palette (2017). Written and composed by IU, Oh Hyuk, and Lee Jong-hoon, and produced by the latter, the song served as her second pre-release single, released on April 7, 2017. The R&B influenced single offered a contrast to her previous ballad styled single in a collaboration that received much critical praise.

"Can't Love You Anymore" debuted at number three on the Gaon Digital Chart, below IU's own "Through the Night" and Winner's "Really Really". It became the number one single in South Korea the following week, becoming IU’s 15th number one single in the country. This enabled her to extend her lead at the time over popular idol groups Big Bang, Sistar, and 2NE1, which each had nine. The song was nominated for the Mnet Asian Music Awards's Qoo10 Song of the Year and for Best Collaboration. While an official music video for the song was never released, two performance versions were released onto YouTube.

== Release ==
On March 25, 2017, the day after her lead single "Through the Night" was released, IU had already begun teasing "Can't Love You Anymore." Posting on her fancafe, IU stated "the second pre-release track will have a completely different feel from ‘Through the Night’. This is a new challenge for me. It’s not a dance track, but it’s a sound that I haven’t used that much before." She also revealed that the track would feature lead singer Oh Hyuk from the band Hyukoh due to the fact she admired his vocal color. On April 4, IU continued to tease her next single by posting the art cover online, featuring the two singers on a yellow background. The day before the song's release, IU uploaded her final teaser in the form of a short video clip of her and Oh Hyuk playfully displaying their friendship and encouraging people to listen to the song the following day. The song was finally released on April 7, 2017.

== Composition ==
“Can't Love You Anymore” is a smooth R&B song, which features a minimalistic production with few electronic additions to the instruments. The vocals are heavily pronounced and layered upon one another. IU’s and Oh Hyuk's vocals are described as being complementary to one another in this song about heartbreak. The track was written and composed by IU and Oh Hyuk, while it was produced by Lee Jong-hoon It runs for three minutes and fifteen seconds and is performed in the key of E minor. The tempo runs at 66 beats per minute and is set in a 4/4 time signature.

Lyrically, the song discusses a rocky relationship wherein two lovers have lost the fire in their relationship. The track describes how despite both of the narrators being aware of the issue, they both attempt to unsuccessfully ignore it. It has been described as a song that while cognizant, is nonetheless heart-wrenching.

== Commercial performance ==
The song shot to the top of the Instiz iChart upon release, and eventually achieved a Perfect All-Kill, as the single hit number one on all of the major South Korean music sites simultaneously. "Can't Love You Anymore" is IU's ninth career Perfect All-Kill, and was achieved a mere two weeks after her previous one for her song "Through the Night" (IU has since extended this number to 12 Perfect All-Kills). The song also marked Oh Hyuk's third Perfect All-Kill. Upon its week of release, the song placed third on the Gaon Digital Charts for the 14th charting week of the year – April 2 to 8 – despite being released on April 7. A week later it rose to number one on the digital charts becoming IU's 15th number one in South Korea; a number which has since risen to 18 as of December 2017. The song topped the Gaon monthly chart for April becoming IU's seventh song to top the said chart. The song continued to chart for eight months after its release.

On the week of release, the song sold 167,270 downloads according to Gaon; a number which increased to 196,659 during its second week of release. "Can't Love You Anymore" also pulled large streaming numbers, being streamed 8,107,711 times during its first full week of release. By the end of 2017, 1,536,837 downloads of the song have been sold in South Korea according to Gaon. It surpassed 100 million streams in South Korea in 2018.

== Track listing ==
Digital download / streaming

1. "Can't Love You Anymore" – 3:15

== Charts ==
Chart (2017)	Peak position
South Korea (Gaon)	1

== Sales ==
Chart	Sales
South Korea (digital)	2,500,000
