= Palette (album) =

Studio album by IU
- Released: April 21, 2017
- Recorded: 2016–2017
- Genre: K-pop
- Length: 39:56
- Language: Korean
- Labels: LOEN; Fave
- Producers: IU; Lee Jong-hoon

IU chronology
| Chat-Shire (2015) | Palette (2017) | A Flower Bookmark 2 (2017) |

Singles from Palette
- 1. "Through the Night" Released: March 24, 2017; 2. "Can't Love You Anymore" Released: April 7, 2017; 3. "Palette" Released: April 21, 2017

Palette (Korean: 팔레트; RR: Palleteu) is the fourth studio album by South Korean singer-songwriter IU. It was released on April 21, 2017, by LOEN Entertainment under its imprint FAVE Entertainment. Palette is IU's first album since Chat-Shire (2015), and her first full-length release since Modern Times (2013).

The album was successful both commercially and critically. It spawned three singles; "Through the Night" was released as the album's lead single on March 24, 2017, followed by "Can't Love You Anymore" on April 7, and the title track, "Palette", released on April 21. All three singles from Palette reached number one on South Korean Gaon Digital Chart, becoming only one of the few albums to contain three or more number-one singles.

Palette was met with critical acclaim upon its release. Billboard magazine listed the album at number one on their list of the best K-pop albums of 2017, and was named amongst the 100 best Korean albums since 2004 by EBS. The album earned IU a Melon Music Award for Album of the Year, and a nomination for Artist of the Year and won Best Album Award in the 27th Seoul Music Awards. Palette also won "Best Pop Album" award at the 15th Korean Music Awards.

== Title and artwork ==
While IU's previous album, Chat-Shire, deliberated the confusion and anxieties of a twenty-three year old, Palette offers the perspective of someone at a more mature stage in life. A body of work that tells the story of self-actualization, the album reads similarly to the final chapters of a bildungsroman where the main character embraces adulthood. In a Naver V-Live, IU stated that:

"The reason why it's titled 'Palette' is that palette caught my attention more than the art itself during art class. It contains various colors and it's beautifully packed in its own unique ways and that became the start of this album." "Palette is considered as a tool but I believe it could be an art itself. Palette is also similar to me right now. That's also why I put the most effort in the title track 'Palette'."

As such, Palette can be taken to refer to the various people in life that one comes across, and their different aspects—appreciating them in a celebratory way. It also refers to the flaws, the accomplishments and the feelings of oneself—and how despite their various "colors" on a palette, they are a work of art all in their own right. This is mentioned in her JTBC interview, where she explains that despite talking about herself, she is also talking about people in general.

The shooting for the album jacket was an extensive process, with IU stating that she had "15 sets" of clothing in one day of shooting. For some of the photos, IU decided to have her in similar poses and shots were taken to that of her previous album Last Fantasy, to highlight the differences in maturity that have developed. Mok Jungwook was the main photographer for the album jacket. He also worked on her previous albums Modern Times and Chat-Shire. Longtime stylist Noh Juhee was also involved, as well as hair stylist Seo Yun, and makeup artist Shin Ae—all of whom have worked with IU since her debut.

== Reception ==
Professional ratings
Review scores
| Source | Rating |
|---|---|
| The 405 | 8.5/10 |
| IZM | 3/5 stars |
| The Star | 9/10 |

Palette received acclaim from music critics. Billboard's Jeff Benjamin wrote, "Since her 2008 debut EP Lost and Found that was fully written and composed by hit producers, IU has been on a gradual mission to taking full artistic control of her music. Plus, Palette is proving to be not only a creative accomplishment with it almost entirely written by the young star, but a body of work that reveals what's going on in her head and has rewarded her with new levels of success."

The album topped Billboard's "20 Best K-Pop Albums 2017" list. Billboard branded the album "the year's shining example of the power in personal K-pop with a release that employed loads of different sounds and stories to share insight about the star beneath the gorgeous gowns and pristine makeup", and furthermore praises IU for "showcas[ing] the moments of self-doubt, worry and gloom, and then explain[ing] them in the music styles and genres she sees most appropriate."

Fuse also listed Palette at number 9 on their list of the "20 Best Albums of 2017", becoming the only Korean release to make the list, and praising her stunning album as making a "major case for the power of personal K-pop". In a review for The 405, Chase McMullen declared, "...the best moments here are when she unburdens the music of others, and simply allows her quest for self-actualization to shine through. This is very much an album of a young adult finding herself, former doubts cast aside for a newfound comfort."

Listicles
| Publication | List | Rank | Ref. |
|---|---|---|---|
| Billboard | The 20 Best K-Pop Albums of 2017 | 1 | |
| EBS | Top 100 Korean Albums (2004–2023) | No order | |
| Fuse | The 20 Best Albums of 2017 | 9 | |
| Paste | The 30 Greatest K-pop Albums of All Time | 4 | |

== Accolades ==
Awards and nominations for Palette
| Year | Organization | Award | Result | Ref. |
|---|---|---|---|---|
| 2017 | Melon Music Awards | Album of the Year | Won | |
| 2018 | Golden Disc Awards | Best Album (Bonsang) | Nominated | |
| 2018 | Korean Music Awards | Album of the Year | Nominated | |
| 2018 | Korean Music Awards | Best Pop Album | Won | |
| 2018 | Seoul Music Awards | Best Album Award | Won | |

== Track listing ==
| No. | Title | Lyrics | Music | Arrangement | Length |
|---|---|---|---|---|---|
| 1. | "Dlwlrma" (이 지금; I jigeum) | IU | Kim Je-hwi | Kim Je-hwi | 3:02 |
| 2. | "Palette" (팔레트; Palleteu; featuring G-Dragon) | IU, G-Dragon (Rap Making) | IU | Lee Jong-hoon | 3:37 |
| 3. | "Ending Scene" (이런 엔딩; Ireon ending) | IU | Sam Kim | Lee Jong-hoon | 4:09 |
| 4. | "Can't Love You Anymore" (사랑이 잘; Sarangi jal; with Oh Hyuk) | IU, Oh Hyuk | IU, Oh Hyuk, Lee Jong-hoon | Lee Jong-hoon | 3:15 |
| 5. | "Jam Jam" (잼잼; Jaemjaem) | Sunwoo Jungah, IU | Sunwoo Jungah | Sunwoo Jungah, Yoon Suk-chul | 3:38 |
| 6. | "Black Out" | IU | Lee Jong-hoon | Lee Jong-hoon | 3:47 |
| 7. | "Full Stop" (마침표; Machimpyo) | IU | Son Sung-je | Son Sung-je | 3:56 |
| 8. | "Through the Night" (밤편지; Bampyeonji) | IU | Kim Je-hwi, Kim Hee-won | Kim Je-hwi, Kim Hee-won | 4:13 |
| 9. | "Love Alone" (그렇게 사랑은; Geureoke sarangeun) | Lee Byung-woo | Lee Byung-woo | Lee Byung-woo | 4:41 |
| 10. | "Dear Name" (이름에게; Ireumege) | IU, Kim Eana | Lee Jong-hoon | Lee Jong-hoon, Hong So-jin | 4:49 |
| Total length: | | | | | 39:56 |

== Charts ==
=== Weekly charts ===
| Chart (2017) | Peak position |
|---|---|
| Japanese Albums (Oricon) | 96 |
| South Korean Albums (Gaon) | 1 |
| Taiwanese Albums (Five Music) | 1 |
| US World Albums (Billboard) | 1 |

== Sales ==
| Region | Sales amount |
|---|---|
| Japan | 1,303 |
| South Korea | 145,911 |

== Release history ==
| Region | Date | Format | Label | Ref. |
|---|---|---|---|---|
| South Korea | April 21, 2017 | Digital download | LOEN Entertainment | |
| Various | April 21, 2017 | Digital download | LOEN Entertainment | |
| South Korea | April 24, 2017 | CD | LOEN Entertainment | |
