= Through the Night (IU song) =

Song by IU

Single by IU

from the album Palette
- Released: March 24, 2017
- Genre: Ballad
- Length: 4:13
- Label: Fave
- Composers: Kim Je-hwi; Kim Hee-won
- Lyricist: IU
- Producers: Kim Je-hwi; Kim Hee-won

IU singles chronology
"Twenty-Three" (2015)	"Through the Night" (2017)	"Can't Love You Anymore" (2017)

Music video
- "Through the Night" on YouTube

"Through the Night" (Korean: 밤편지; RR: Bampyeonji; lit. 'Night letter') is a song by South Korean singer-songwriter IU for her fourth studio album Palette (2017). Written by IU and composed and produced by Kim Je-hwi and Kim Hee-won, the song served as the lead single of Palette, released on March 24, 2017. Marking her return to music, the stripped-down song offers a sharp departure from her previous single "Twenty-Three".

"Through the Night" was a major success in South Korea, debuting at number two on the Gaon Digital Chart before becoming IU's 14th number one single in South Korea the following week—enabling her to extend her lead over idol groups Big Bang, 2NE1 and Sistar, which each had nine. It experienced tremendous longevity; as of March 2022, it has never once fallen out of the major music charts in South Korea, being listed within the top 100 of the Gaon year-end chart every single year since. "Through the Night" is the third best-selling single in South Korea since 2010 with more than six million digital downloads.

The song won Song of the Year at the annual Golden Disc Awards in addition to Song of the Year (March) and Long-Run Song of the Year at the 7th Gaon Chart Music Awards. Its accompanying music video was directed by Lee Rae-kyung, and was the second most viewed Korean music video by a female soloist on YouTube in 2017, after IU's own song from the same album, "Palette".

== Background and composition ==
While the album itself was teased as early as February, IU began releasing teasers for the song the same week of its release. The first set of images were revealed Monday, March 20, which revealed the singer-songwriter dressed in traditional Korean clothing. Two days before the song's release, a teaser video was released featuring snippets of IU's voice. IU herself was seen in the video in a traditional Korean home wearing some of the same outfits from the teaser images. The song and accompanying music video were released the Friday of March 24, 2017, at 6:00 pm KST.

“Through the Night” is a minimalist ballad song, which most prominently emphasize the singer's vocals over the instrumentation. IU's vocals are described as being warm, and yet apprehensive in this love song which delves into the acoustic and folk genres. The track was written by IU, while it was composed and produced by Je-Hwi Kim, and Hee-Won Kim. It runs for four minutes and thirteen seconds and is performed in the key of E-flat. The tempo runs at 79 beats per minute and is set in a 4/4 time signature. Lyrically, the song discusses missing someone through the night. The track describes a narrator who is afraid their love interest will disappear, and so through the song they're secretly confessing their love and wishing them pleasant dreams.

== Critical reception ==
Professional ratings
Review scores
Source	Rating
IZM	3.5/5 stars

"Through the Night" received favorable reviews from music critics praising the song's analog emotion and highlighting IU's songwriting skills and her vocal performance in the song.

South Korean music portal IZM, included the song on their list of "10 singles that represented 2017" explaining "There was no other song this year that expressed more precisely the precious, small, and pure emotion that wells up when penning a letter for someone you love all night as this one." while praising IU's skill as a songwriter.

== Commercial performance ==
The song shot to the top of the Instiz iChart upon release, and eventually achieved a Perfect All-Kill, as the single hit Number 1 on all of the major South Korean music sites simultaneously. "Through the Night" is her eighth career Perfect All-Kill, which at the time gave her twice as many Perfect All-Kills on the chart as any other artist (IU has since extended this number to 22 Perfect All-Kills). Upon its week of release, the song placed second on the Gaon Digital Charts for the 12th charting week of the year - March 19 to 25 - despite being released the 24th of that month. A week later it rose to number one on the digital charts becoming IU's 14th number one in South Korea; a number which has since risen to 18 as of December 2017. On April 6, it was declared that the single achieved a "Triple Crown" for taking Number 1 on the Gaon Combined Digital Chart, Online Download Chart and Online Streaming Chart.

On the week of release, the song sold 183,168 downloads according to Gaon; a number which increased to 208,241 during its second week of release. "Through the Night" also pulled massive streaming numbers, being streamed 7,694,321 times during its first full week of release. On December 7 "Through the Night " surpassed 2 million downloads on Gaon (37 weeks). It is one of the fastest songs to achieve such milestone that included the 2014 song's Some (33 weeks), the 2016 song's Galaxy (40 weeks) and the 2017 song's I Will Go to You Like the First Snow (36 weeks).

By the end of 2017, 2,181,372 downloads of the song have been sold in South Korea according to Gaon - making it the second best selling song of the year after Ailee's "I Will Go to You Like the First Snow", and has accumulated 134,048,681 streams, making it one of the most popular songs of the year by this method of consumption as well. The track also debuted at number one on both Gaon's Mobile and Background Music charts, solidifying the song's omnipresence in the industry. On January 12, 2018, Gaon officially published their yearly digital, download and streaming charts for 2017, where "Through the Night" placed second on all three charts. The song accumulated over 300 million streams in South Korea by December 2021. (Note: South Korean streaming figures for 'Through the Night' as of December 2021.)

== Music video ==
The accompanying music video was directed by Rae-kyung Lee, and released alongside the song. The video begins with a scene depicting a traditional countryside home, with birds chirping audibly in the background. IU is seen flipping through the pages of a book. The music begins with the pressing of a cassette tape, giving the music video an old-timey feel. The video consists of the singer waiting alone throughout the traditional house. She is styled in traditional clothing, and occasionally is singing into an antique microphone in different shots. The lack of action reflects the lyrical message of loneliness in the song.

In an Instagram post, the director answered fan questions about the props used throughout the video. Lee revealed the book used in the video was a 1950 first edition design book by Dong-Joo Yoon entitled "The Sky, The Wind, The Stars and The Poetry". It was chosen in an effort to incorporate books with vertical writing to add to the old-fashioned theme of the music video. Furthermore, since IU admires the Mise-en-scène, the director filled the set with various items from the time period of the 1950s and 1960s. The video currently has over 100 million views making it the second most popular Korean music video by a female soloist in 2017.

== Live performances ==
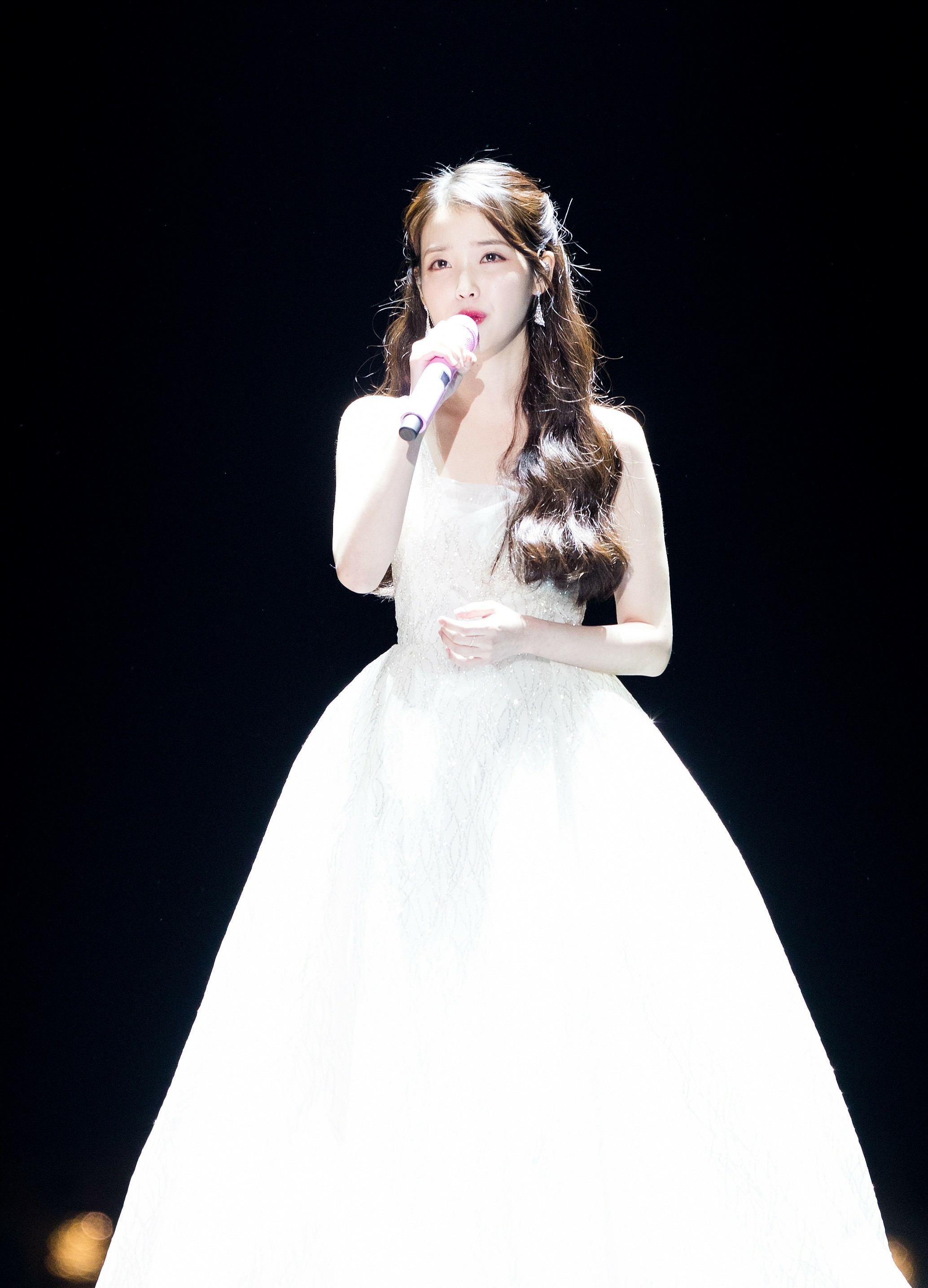
IU performing the track at the 2017 Melon Music Awards

Upon the release of her album "Palette", IU began promoting on music shows. "Through the Night"'s only performance on a music show was on April 23's episode of Inkigayo, where the song had won the previous week. IU has also performed this song during the 104th episode of Picnic Live Season 2. Yu Huiyeol's Sketchbook was another televised broadcast featuring a performance of the song. IU sang the song at an award show for the first time at the 2017 Melon Music Awards, where her performance was widely praised alongside her performance of her song "Dear Name". She also performed the song on 32nd Golden Disc Awards alongside her other hits, "Can't Love You Anymore" and "Autumn Morning".

IU has also presented the song at various concerts and musical festivals throughout the year, where the song's great popularity frequently led the audience to sing-along, which IU often encourages.

== Accolades ==
Awards and nominations for "Through the Night"
Year	Organization	Award	Result	Ref.
2017	Melon Music Awards	Song of the Year	Nominated	
2017	Mnet Asian Music Awards	Song of the Year	Nominated	
2017	Mnet Asian Music Awards	Best Vocal Performance – Female	Nominated	
2018	Gaon Chart Music Awards	Song of the Year – March	Won	
2018	Gaon Chart Music Awards	Long-Run Song of the Year	Won	
2018	Golden Disc Awards	Digital Daesang	Won	
2018	Golden Disc Awards	Digital Bonsang	Won	
2018	Korean Music Awards	Song of the Year	Nominated	
2018	Korean Music Awards	Best Pop Song	Nominated	
2020	Bugs Music Awards	20th Anniversary – Most Loved Music	Won	

Music program awards
Program	Date	Ref.
Inkigayo	April 9, 2017	
Show Champion	April 12, 2017	

== Track listing ==
Digital download / streaming

1. "Through the Night" – 4:13

== Charts ==
=== Weekly charts ===
Chart (2017)	Peak position
South Korea (Gaon)	1
South Korea (K-pop Hot 100)	18
US World Digital Song Sales (Billboard)	16

=== Monthly charts ===
Chart (2017)	Peak position
South Korea (Gaon)	3

=== Year-end charts ===
Chart	Year	Position
South Korea (Gaon)	2017	2
South Korea (Gaon)	2018	21
South Korea (Gaon)	2019	60
South Korea (Gaon)	2020	91
South Korea (Gaon)	2021	102
South Korea (Circle)	2022	118
South Korea (Circle)	2024	137
South Korea (Circle)	2025	179

== Sales ==
Country	Sales amount
South Korea (digital)	7,000,000 (Note: South Korean sales figures for "Through the Night" as of July 2022.)
