= Palette (song) =

2017 single by IU featuring G-Dragon

Single by IU featuring G-Dragon

from the album Palette
- Released: April 21, 2017
- Genre: Electropop
- Length: 3:37
- Label: Fave
- Songwriters: IU; G-Dragon
- Composer: IU
- Producer: Lee Jong Hoon

IU singles chronology
| "Can't Love You Anymore" (2017) | "Palette" (2017) | "Dear Name" (2017) |

G-Dragon singles chronology
| "Zutter" (2015) | "Palette" (2017) | "Untitled, 2014" (2017) |

Audio sample
- file; help

Music video
- "Palette" on YouTube

"Palette" (Korean: 팔레트) is a song recorded by South Korean singers IU and G-Dragon for the fourth studio album of the same title. IU herself composed the music and penned the lyrics with the collaboration of G-Dragon. The song was released on April 21, 2017, in conjunction with the release of the album as the album's third single, following "Through the Night" and "Can't Love You Anymore".

"Palette" received extremely positive feedback and was a commercial success topping all the major music sites in South Korea. The song debuted atop the Gaon Digital Chart, becoming IU's 16th number one single in South Korea. The song’s accompanying music video was directed by Lee Rae-kyung, and was the most viewed Korean music video by a female soloist on YouTube in 2017.

== Background and music ==
"Palette" is a fizzy, electro-pop track which is considered the centerpiece of IU's album and has strong R&B leanings and is described as a charming millennial coming-of-age song with clever word play. The track was written by IU and G-Dragon, while it was produced and composed by IU. It runs for three minutes and thirty seven seconds and is performed in the key of C. The tempo runs at 103 beats per minute and is set in a 4/4 time signature. Lyrically, the song feels like a declaration of who IU really is. The track describes that now, IU is confident in herself and though she still has questions about herself, she's at least moving forward with self-assurance.

== Critical reception ==
"Palette" received universal acclaim from music critics praising IU's skill as a songwriter and her clever use of word play. The song's message about self-examination and G-Dragon's rap was also praised by critics.

Billboard magazine listed "Palette" at number six on its list of "Best K-Pop Songs of 2017", explaining "The mellow-dy belies a topsy-turvy world of self-satire, idiosyncratic sound effects and throwbacks to older eras." while describing the song as catchy. The New York Times Magazine featured the song on its list of "25 Songs That Tell Us Where Music Is Going" appreciating IU’s ability as a singer-songwriter to project authenticity in K-pop.

== Commercial performance ==
The song shot to the top of the Instiz iChart upon release, and eventually achieved a Perfect All-Kill, as the single hit Number 1 on all of the major South Korean music sites simultaneously. "Palette" is her tenth career Perfect All-Kill (IU has since extended this number to 12 Perfect All-Kills). Upon its week of release, the song placed first on the Gaon Digital Charts for the 16th charting week of the year - April 16 to 22 - despite being released the 21st of that month. The song became IU's 16th number one song on the Gaon Digital Chart. The following week the song stayed at number one on the chart achieving a "Triple Crown" for taking Number 1 on the Gaon Combined Digital Chart, Online Download Chart and Online Streaming Chart.

On the week of release, the song sold 207,139 downloads according to Gaon; a number which increased to 223,228 during its second week of release. "Palette" also pulled strong streaming numbers, being streamed 2,930,672 times during its first two days of release; a number which increased to 8,859,769 the following week of release. The song stayed a total of three weeks at the top of Gaon's Online Streaming Chart. By the end of 2017, 1,817,177 downloads of the song have been sold in South Korea according to Gaon, making it the fourth best selling song of the year. It has accumulated over 100 million streams.

== Music video and promotion ==
The accompanying music video was directed by Lee Rae-kyung, and released alongside the song. It became IU's first music video to surpass 100 million views. Upon the release of her album "Palette," IU began promoting on music shows. She first performed "Palette" on April 23's episode of Inkigayo, where her pre-release track, "Through the Night" had won the previous week. IU also performed this song during the 104th episode of Picnic Live Season 2 and during the 882nd episode of Music Bank. Yu Huiyeol's Sketchbook was another televised broadcast featuring a performance of the song where she performed a different version of the song with some changes in the lyrics. She also performed the song at the 7th Gaon Chart Music Awards alongside "Through the Night".

IU has also presented the song at various concerts and musical festivals throughout the year. In most of her live performances of the song, IU is accompanied by several dancers as they perform the choreography featured in the music video.

== Accolades ==
Music program awards (10 total)
| Program | Date | Ref. |
|---|---|---|
| M Countdown | April 27, 2017 | |
| M Countdown | May 4, 2017 | |
| Show! Music Core | April 29, 2017 | |
| Show! Music Core | May 6, 2017 | |
| Inkigayo | April 30, 2017 | |
| Inkigayo | May 7, 2017 | |
| Inkigayo | May 14, 2017 | |
| Music Bank | May 5, 2017 | |
| Music Bank | May 19, 2017 | |
| Show Champion | May 17, 2017 | |

== Chart performance ==
=== Weekly charts ===
| Chart (2017) | Peak position |
|---|---|
| South Korea (Gaon) | 1 |
| US World Digital Songs (Billboard) | 4 |

=== Year-end charts ===
| Chart (2017) | Position |
|---|---|
| South Korea (Gaon) | 7 |

== Sales ==
| Country | Units |
|---|---|
| South Korea (digital) | 2,500,000 |
