= List of IU concert tours =

IU concert tours
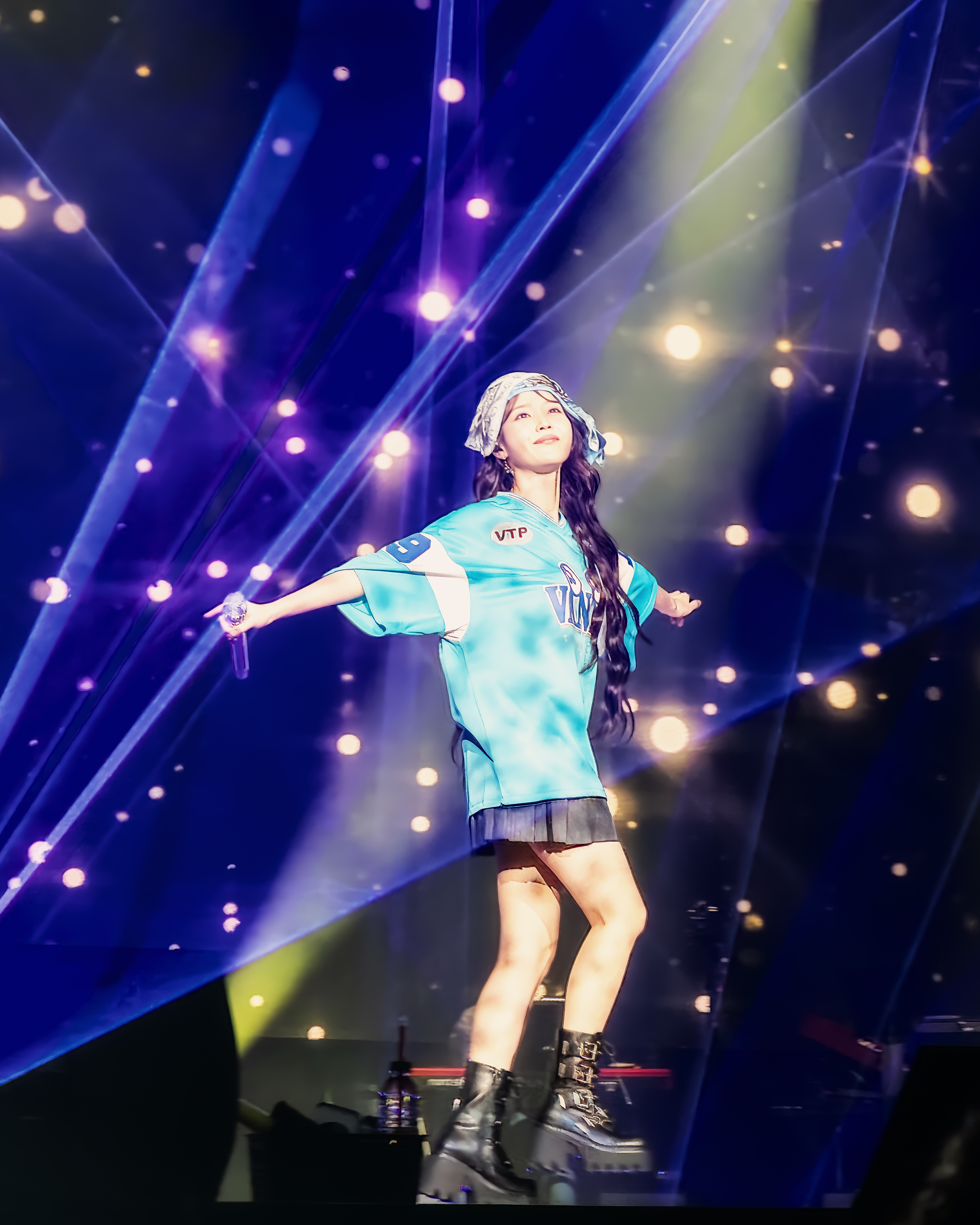
- IU HEREH concert in Oakland, 30 July 2024
- Concert tours: 9
- One-off concerts: 3

South Korean singer-songwriter, record producer and actress IU has embarked on numerous headlining concert tours, five of which toured multiple countries in Asia. In 2022, on September 17 and 18, IU held a concert, The Golden Hour: Under the Orange Sun, at the Seoul Olympic Stadium, becoming the first Korean female artist to perform there. In 2024 IU embarked on her first world tour, performing in Asia, North America and Europe with the IU HEREH World Tour. The final concert of the tour, held at Seoul World Cup Stadium in September, marked the first entry by a female musician into the venue and the 100th concert of her career.

== Real Fantasy ==
Real Fantasy
- Tour by IU
- Location: South Korea
- Associated album: Last Fantasy
- Start date: June 2, 2012
- End date: September 10, 2012
- No. of shows: 13
- Attendance: 28,000

IU concert chronology
- Real Fantasy (2012); Modern Times (2013)

Real Fantasy (Korean: 리얼 판타지) was the first concert tour by IU. She toured six cities in South Korea: Seoul, Ulsan, Jeonju, Suwon, Busan and Daegu. The tour began on June 2, 2012, with two dates in Seoul and finished on July 15 in Daegu. Two dates in Seoul were added to celebrate the end on the tour.

=== Background ===
On April 16, 2012, Loen announced IU would tour concert halls in six cities in South Korea: Seoul, Ulsan, Jeonju, Suwon, Busan and Daegu. Tickets for the first two dates in Seoul were put on sale on Interpark the next day and sold out in 30 minutes. IU released a single album, Spring of a Twenty Year Old, on May 11. The stages of the three songs included in the album were revealed for the first time at the concert. On August 27, it was announced that IU would hold two additional encore concerts on an outdoor stage in Seoul on September 22 and 23. Tickets were put on sale on Interpark on September 3. A special DVD was released digitally on December 18, while the physical version was released on December 27. It included footage of the encore concert held in Seoul on September 22, about 50 minutes of live performances, concert rehearsals and interviews, other videos, an 84-page photo book, and 30 star cards, as well as songs from Spring of a Twenty Year Old and Last Fantasy.

=== Show overview and reception ===
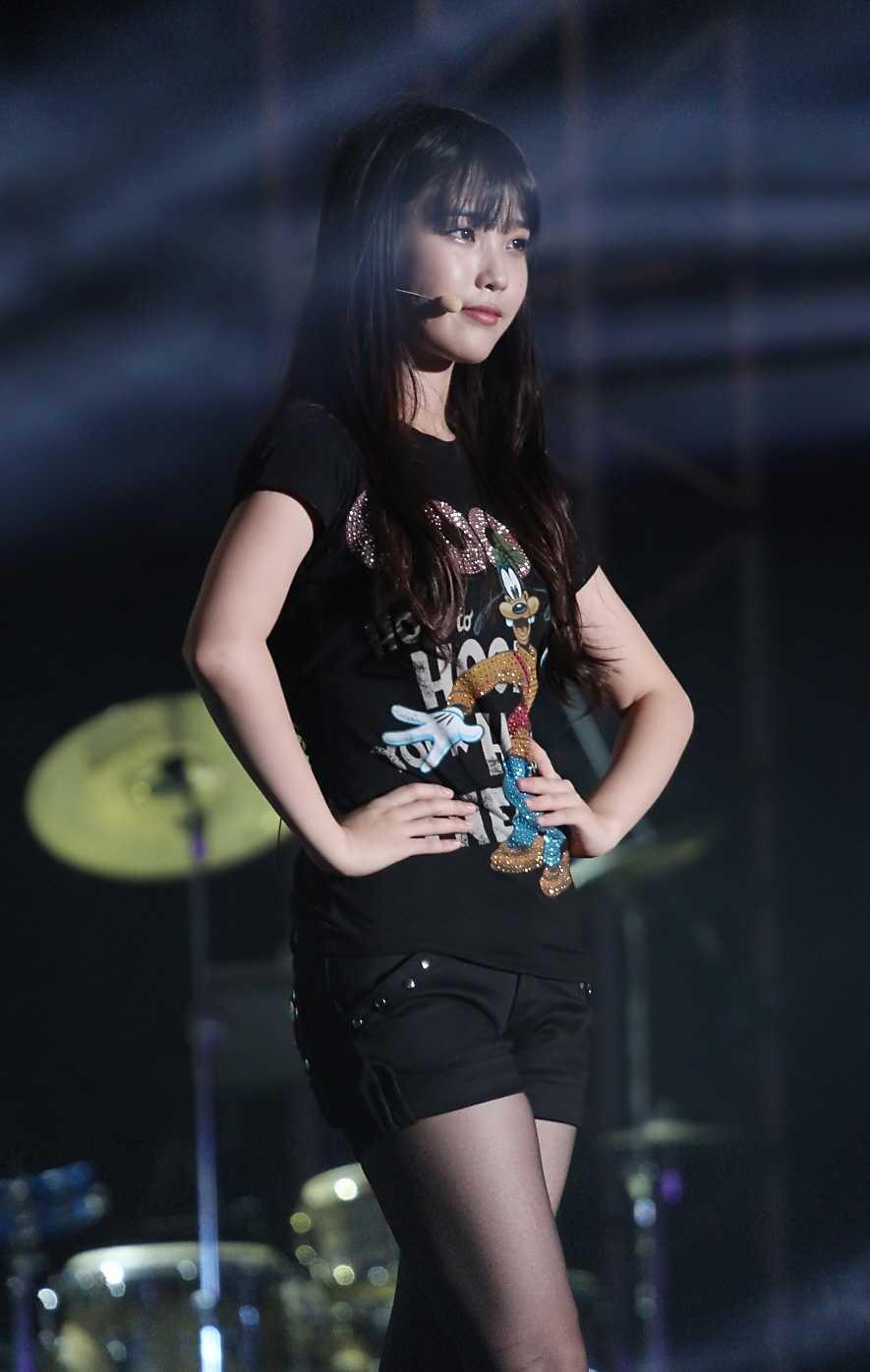
IU performing at the Real Fantasy tour on September 23, 2012.

The music director was G. Gorilla, singer-songwriter and member of the South Korean rock band Eve. For the concert, IU collaborated with the Urban Pops Orchestra. The concert opened with "the dreamlike atmosphere" of "Cruel Fairytale" and "You & I". IU performed "Peach", "Rain Drop", "Nagging", "The Night of the First Breakup", "Mia", "Every End of the Day", "Love Attack", "Marshmallow", "Uncle". During "Nagging" and "Uncle", she was joined on stage by Lim Seul-ong and Heo Kyung-hwan, respectively. She performed dance covers of a mix of songs, including "Boom Boom Pow" by Black Eyed Peas, "Rainism" by Rain and "Trouble Maker" by Trouble Maker. Several singers made guest appearances during the tour, including Lee Juck, Lee Seung-gi, 2AM, Sung Si-kyung, K.Will, Kim Tae-woo, Leessang, Sunny Hill, Jia, Ra.D, Haha, Norazo, Sweet Sorrow, Baechigi, Mighty Mouth, Huh Gak and Second Moon. Others celebrities that made an appearance include Noh Hong-cheol, Park Ji-sung, Yoo In-na and Ji Hyun-woo.

The tour recorded an average ticket sale rate of 90% in 11 dates in six cities and attracted 20,000 spectators. The additional two dates in Seoul attracted 8,000 spectators. After the first two-day concert in Seoul, it was reported that 43.8% of ticket purchasers were in their 20s, 24.2% were in their 30s and 19.6% were in their 40s, while only 12.4% were in their teens. Furthermore, 71% of the spectators were male, which was considered uncommon for a K-pop concert. The first show in Seoul was well received and IU's ability to confidently lead a three-hour concert by herself was praised alongside her vocals and dancing skills. Lee Mi-young of JoyNews24 commented that the performance was enjoyable for both young adults and families. Park Young-woong of Star News said that "it was a performance that predicted IU's future". The tour as a whole received positive reviews.

=== Tour dates ===
List of concerts showing date, city, country, venue, and attendance
| Date | City | Country | Venue | Attendance |
|---|---|---|---|---|
| June 2, 2012 | Seoul | South Korea | Kyung Hee University Peace Hall | 20,000 |
| June 3, 2012 | Seoul | South Korea | Kyung Hee University Peace Hall | 20,000 |
| June 9, 2012 | Ulsan | South Korea | Ulsan KBS Hall | 20,000 |
| June 10, 2012 | Ulsan | South Korea | Ulsan KBS Hall | 20,000 |
| June 16, 2012 | Jeonju | South Korea | Jeonbuk National University Stadium | 20,000 |
| June 30, 2012 | Suwon | South Korea | Gyeonggi Arts Center | 20,000 |
| July 1, 2012 | Suwon | South Korea | Gyeonggi Arts Center | 20,000 |
| July 7, 2012 | Busan | South Korea | Busan KBS Hall | 20,000 |
| July 8, 2012 | Busan | South Korea | Busan KBS Hall | 20,000 |
| July 14, 2012 | Daegu | South Korea | Yeungnam University Grand Hall | 20,000 |
| July 15, 2012 | Daegu | South Korea | Yeungnam University Grand Hall | 20,000 |
| September 22, 2012 | Seoul | South Korea | Korean War Memorial Peace Plaza | 8,000 |
| September 23, 2012 | Seoul | South Korea | Korean War Memorial Peace Plaza | 8,000 |
| Total | | | | 28,000 |

== Modern Times ==
Modern Times
- Tour by IU
- Location: South Korea
- Associated album: Modern Times
- Start date: November 23, 2013
- End date: December 1, 2013
- No. of shows: 4

IU concert chronology
- Real Fantasy (2012); Modern Times (2013); Chat-Shire (2015)

Modern Times (Korean: 모던타임즈) was the second concert tour by IU, launched in support of her third studio album Modern Times (2013). She visited two cities in South Korea: Seoul on November 23 and 24, 2013, and Busan on November 30 and December 1.

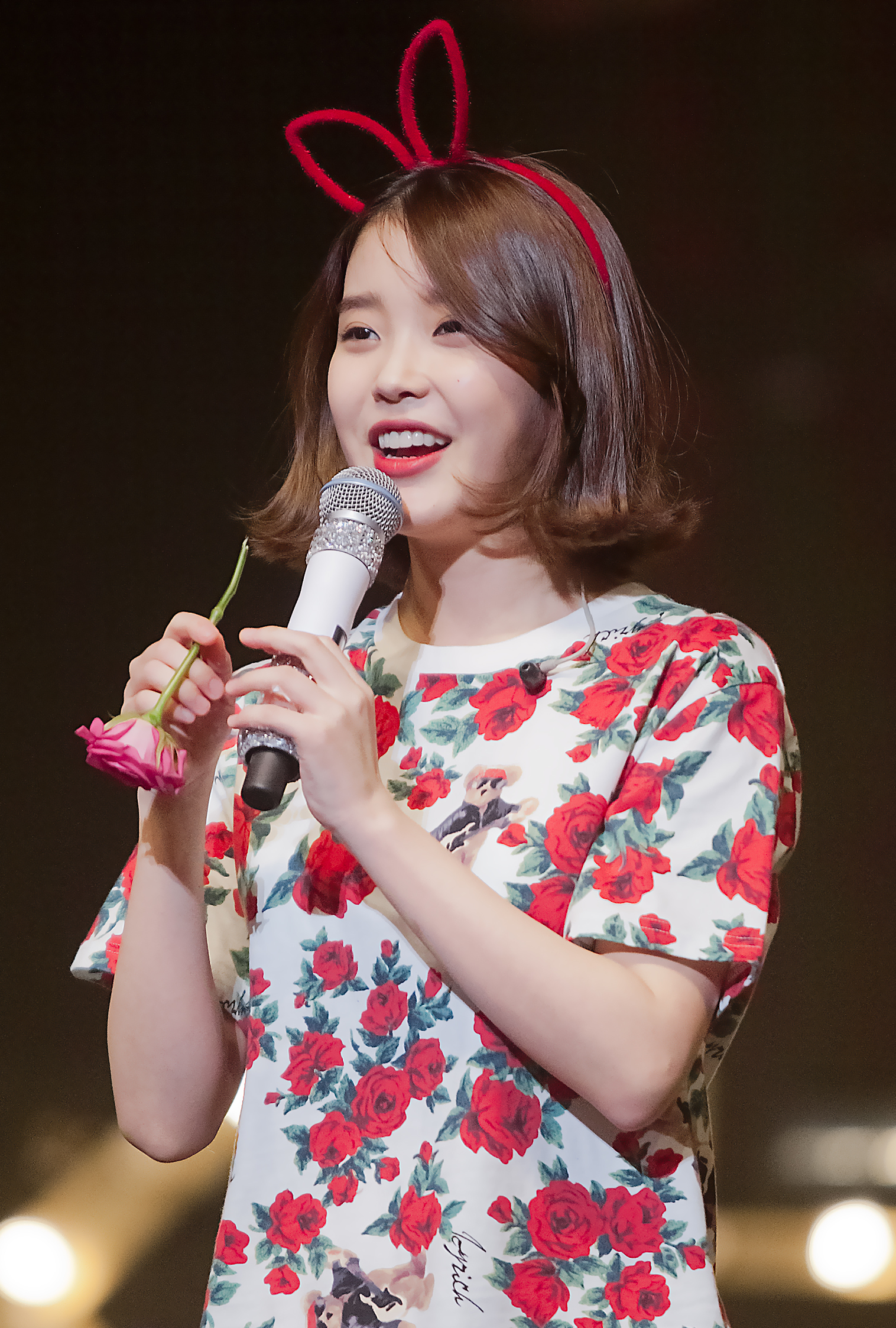
IU performing at the Modern Times tour on December 1, 2013.

=== Background ===
Following the release of her third studio album Modern Times (2013), IU started promoting the album on music shows but had to cancel the remaining activities due to her casting in the television series Bel Ami (2013–2014). On October 15, 2013, it was announced that IU would hold her second concert tour Modern Times to support the album. She performed at Kyung Hee University Peace Hall in Seoul on November 23 and 24, 2013, and at Busan KBS Hall in Busan on November 30 and December 1.

=== Show overview ===
IU presented songs from Modern Times and rearranged versions of her past hit songs. She started the concert with "The Red Shoes". She played the role of a woman seeking revenge after her lover abandoned her in "Wait" and "Obliviate"'s stages. During "Mia", "I Really Don't Like Her" and "Voice Mail", IU sat down and performed with her acoustic guitar. She also performed "Wild Flower", "You Know", "Every End of the Day", "You & I", "Good Day", "Modern Times" and "Secret". IU covered older popular Korean songs, including "The Forgotten Season" by Lee Yong, "The Letter" by Kim Kwang-jin and "Somehow I Found You" by Peregrine Falcon. She was joined on stage by Choi Baek-ho for their collaborative song "Walk with Me, Girl" and together they covered his 1995 single "About Romance".

=== Tour dates ===
List of concerts showing date, city, country, and venue
| Date | City | Country | Venue |
|---|---|---|---|
| November 23, 2013 | Seoul | South Korea | Kyung Hee University Peace Hall |
| November 24, 2013 | Seoul | South Korea | Kyung Hee University Peace Hall |
| November 30, 2013 | Busan | South Korea | Busan KBS Hall |
| December 1, 2013 | Busan | South Korea | Busan KBS Hall |

== Chat-Shire ==
Chat-Shire
- Tour by IU
- Location: South Korea
- Associated album: Chat-Shire
- Start date: November 22, 2015
- End date: December 31, 2015
- No. of shows: 7
- Attendance: 15,000+

IU concert chronology
- Modern Times (2013); Chat-Shire (2015); 24 Steps: One, Two, Three, Four (2016–2017)

Chat-Shire was the third concert tour by IU. She toured four cities in South Korea: Seoul, Busan, Daegu and Gwangju. The tour began on November 21, 2015, with two dates in Seoul and finished on December 31.

=== Background ===
On October 19, 2015, four days before the release of IU's fourth extended play, Chat-Shire, it was announced that the singer would hold her third concert tour Chat-Shire in support of the EP, and would not perform on music shows to focus on live performances and her health, which had been deteriorating due to hectic schedules. Starting in November, the tour four cities in South Korea: Seoul, Busan, Daegu and Gwangju. Tickets for the first two concerts in Seoul were put on sale on Interpark on October 26 and, according to Loen, sold out in one minute. Ticket sales for the concert in Busan started on October 29. On December 8, it was announced that IU would hold two additional encore concerts at Jamsil Students' Gymnasium in Seoul on December 30 and 31. Tickets were put on sale on Interpark on December 10. On December 31, Loen announced on Facebook that a limited edition photo book would be sold alongside ticket reservations. It would also be sold on Melon Shopping.

Despite its success, Chat-Shire became controversial when the Korean publisher of the novel My Sweet Orange Tree (1968), from which IU took inspiration for the b-side "Zezé", criticized IU's "sexual" interpretation of the five-year-old protagonist in the lyrics of the song and on the EP's cover artwork. The scandal started a heated debate in the Korean entertainment industry over freedom of interpretation. As the main producer of the EP, she was also criticized for illegally sampling Britney Spears' 2007 song "Gimme More" on a bonus track of the EP. As a result, many ticket reservations were allegedly cancelled.

=== Show overview and reception ===
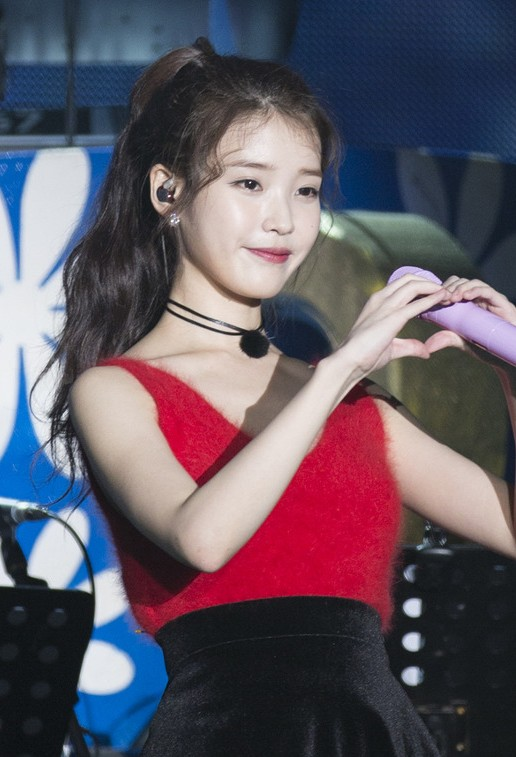
IU performing at the Chat-Shire tour on December 13, 2015.

The concert lasted circa two hours, during which IU performed 20 songs. The first half focused on dance songs, while in the second half IU presented her popular ballads. IU appeared on the stage as a "fairy tale protagonist" wearing a white dress and opened the show with "Shoes". Upon presenting "Zezé", she said "It's a song in the new album. It's a song I love unchangingly". The concert marked IU's first performance of "Twenty-Three", during which she wore a black crop top and hot pants. Commenting on the outfit, she said "I thought it was like Sailor Moon. Isn't it like the clothes of a female protagonist who transforms?". She performed a mix of "lively" and "heartfelt" songs, including "Every End of the Day", "You & I", "The Red Shoes", "The Shower", "Knees", "Bad Day", "Obliviate", "Red Queen", "Everyone Has Secrets" and "See you on Friday". She also sang "My Old Story" and "Meaning of You" from her remake album A Flower Bookmark (2014), as well as a medley of the theme songs of Sailor Moon (1992–1997), Cardcaptor Sakura (1998–2000) and Yumeiro Patissiere (2009–2010). She ended the show with her hit song "Good Day". IU came back on stage for the encore and performed "Heart", "Glasses" and her unreleased song "Drama", which would later be featured on her 2021 EP Pieces.

Among sets, IU took the time to interact with the audience and share personal stories. During the first concert in Seoul, Dynamic Duo joined IU on the stage for "Leon" and performed their songs "Jam" and "Friday Night". Several celebrities made guest appearances during the two-day concert in Seoul, including IU's boyfriend at the time Chang Kiha, Kwon Jung-yeol of 10cm, Yoo In-na, Ji Hyun-woo, Han Seung-yeon, Goo Hara, Lim Seul-ong, Baek A-yeon, Hyukoh, Epik High and GFriend.

The tour attracted 15,000 spectators for the first five performances. IU's vocals and versatility were praised. Choi Hyun-jung of The Dong-a Ilbo said it was "a concert that combines story and song". The concert held on November 21 was IU's first public appearance following the scandal. After a discussion with her music director, she decided to include "Zezé" in the set list despite the controversy. Critics commended IU for her decision, which was perceived as a bold move from the singer that showed "the affection and sincerity she had for this song". Choi Hyun-jung wrote, "IU is a singer with a much stronger mentality than we thought, and at her concert that day, she overcame her burden with her sometimes strong and witty appearance".

=== Tour dates ===
List of concerts showing date, city, country, venue, and attendance
| Date | City | Country | Venue | Attendance |
|---|---|---|---|---|
| November 21, 2015 | Seoul | South Korea | Olympic Hall | 15,000 |
| November 22, 2015 | Seoul | South Korea | Olympic Hall | 15,000 |
| November 29, 2015 | Busan | South Korea | Busan Exhibition & Convention Center | 15,000 |
| December 6, 2015 | Daegu | South Korea | Daegu Exhibition & Convention Center | 15,000 |
| December 13, 2015 | Gwangju | South Korea | Kim Daejung Convention Center | 15,000 |
| December 30, 2015 | Seoul | South Korea | Jamsil Students' Gymnasium | — |
| December 31, 2015 | Seoul | South Korea | Jamsil Students' Gymnasium | — |
| Total | | | | N/A |

== 24 Steps: One, Two, Three, Four ==
24 Steps: One, Two, Three, Four
- Tour by IU
- Location: Asia
- Start date: December 4, 2016
- End date: January 7, 2017
- No. of shows: 4

IU concert chronology
- Chat-Shire (2015); 24 Steps: One, Two, Three, Four (2016–2017); Palette (2017)

Set list in Seoul.

Part 1

1. "Twenty-Four"
2. "Red Queen" (First verse)
3. "Pierrot Smiles At Us"
4. "Shoes"
5. "Every End of the Day"
6. "You & I"

Part 2

7. "Someday"
8. "A Dreamer"
9. "I Really Don't Like Her"
10. "Mia" (Acoustic version)
11. "Meaning of You"
12. "Summer Love" (First verse)
13. "Sogyeokdong"
14. "4AM"
15. "Glasses" (First verse)
16. "Zezé"
17. "Knees

Part 3

18. "Boo" / "Marshmallow"
19. Cover medley of the theme songs of Slam Dunk, Doochi and Puku and Full Moon o Sagashite
20. "Leon"
21. "Merry Christmas Ahead"
22. "See you on Friday" / "Let It Snow"
23. "Good Day"

Encore

24. "The Shower"
25. "Heart"
26. "You Know"

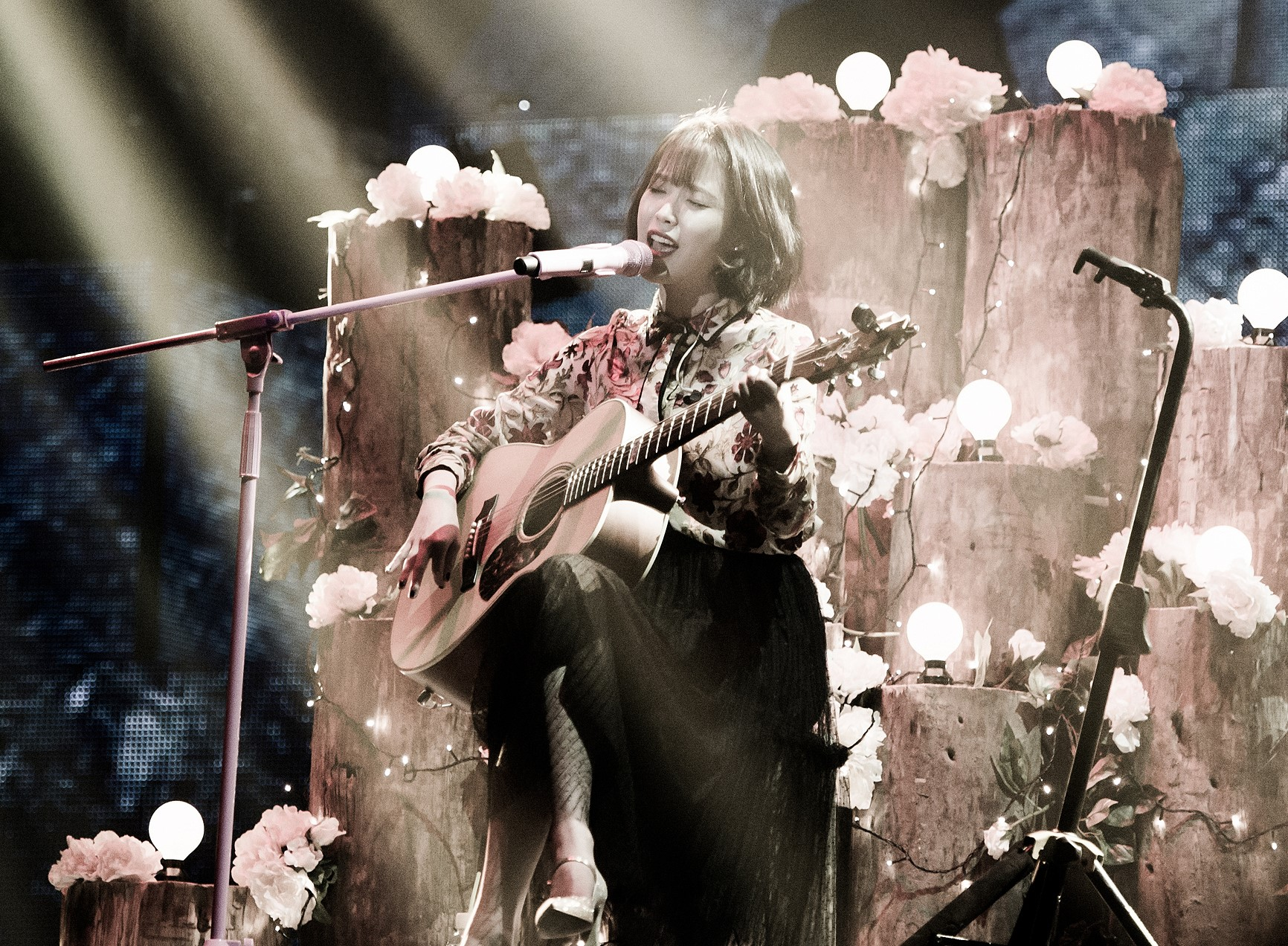
IU at "24 Steps - One, Two, Three, Four" concert, 3 December 2016 11

=== Tour dates ===
Concert dates
| Date | City | Country | Venue | Attendance |
|---|---|---|---|---|
| December 3, 2016 | Seoul | South Korea | SK Olympic Handball Gymnasium | 7,000 |
| December 4, 2016 | Seoul | South Korea | SK Olympic Handball Gymnasium | 7,000 |
| December 16, 2016 | Hong Kong | China | HKCEC–Hall 5BC | — |
| January 7, 2017 | New Taipei City | Taiwan | Xinzhuang Gymnasium | — |

== Palette ==
Palette
- Tour by IU
- Location: Asia
- Associated album: Palette
- Start date: November 3, 2017
- End date: December 10, 2017
- No. of shows: 6

IU concert chronology
- 24 Steps: One, Two, Three, Four (2016–2017); Palette (2017); Dlwlrma (2018–2019)

Set list in Hong Kong

Part 1

1. "dlwlrma"
2. "Red Queen"
3. "The Red Shoes"
4. "Jam Jam"
5. "You & I"
6. "Leon"

Part 2

7. "Every End of the Day"
8. "Secret Garden"
9. "The Shower"
10. "Bad Day"
11. "Night of the First Breakup"
12. "Knees"
13. "Sleepless Rainy Night"

Part 3

14. "Can't Love You Anymore"
15. "Black Out"
16. "Last Night Story"
17. "Twenty-Three"
18. "Hey (Rock Ver)"
19. "Zeze"
20. "Merry Christmas Ahead"
21. "Friday"
22. "Palette"
23. "Good Day"

Encore

24. "Through the Night"
25. "Dear Name"

En-encore

26. "Autumn Morning"
27. "Through the Night" (Cantonese ver.)
28. "Heart"
29. Full Stop
30. Meaning of You

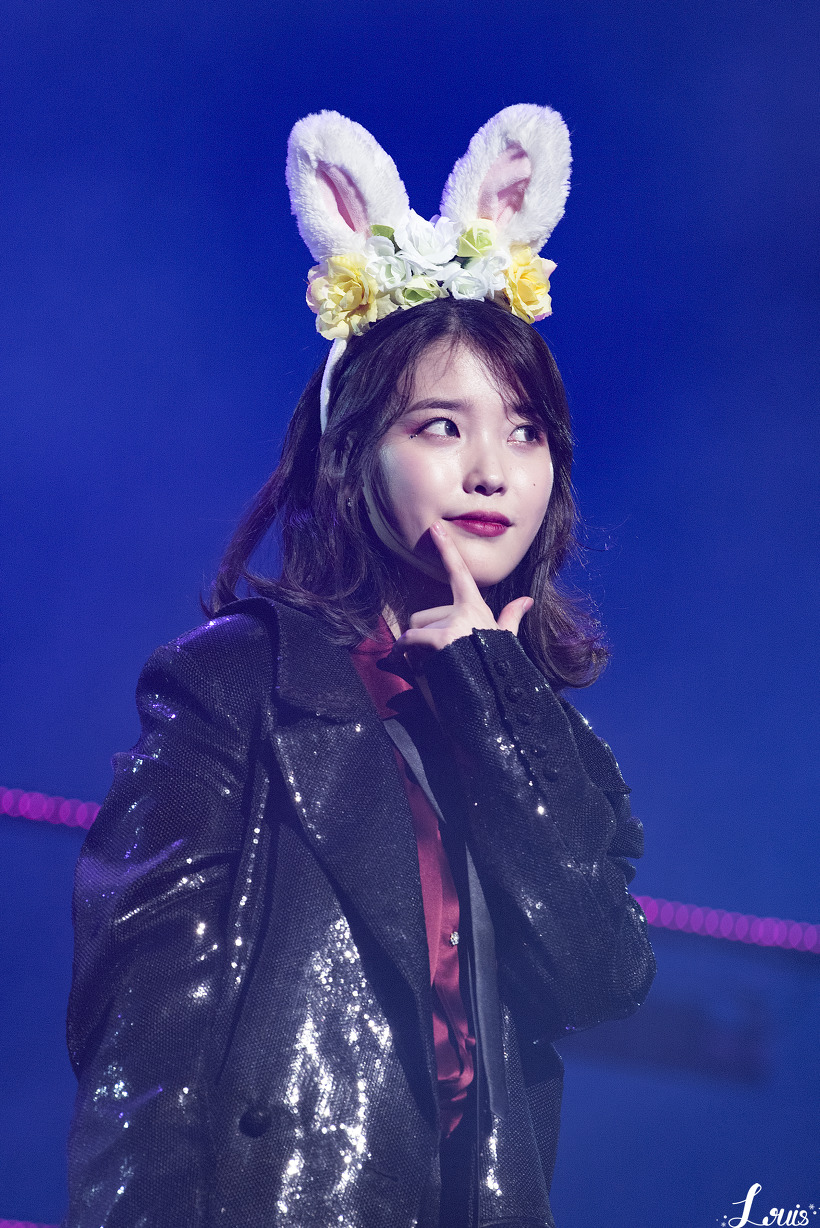
IU at her Palette Tour in Seoul 2017

=== Tour dates ===
| Date | City | Country | Venue | Attendance |
|---|---|---|---|---|
| November 3, 2017 | Busan | South Korea | Sajik Arena | — |
| November 11, 2017 | Gwangju | South Korea | Universiade Gymnasium | — |
| November 25, 2017 | Hong Kong | China | AsiaWorld–Expo Hall 10 | — |
| December 3, 2017 | Cheongju | South Korea | Seokyu Culture Gymnasium | — |
| December 9, 2017 | Seoul | South Korea | Jamsil Indoor Stadium | 12,000 |
| December 10, 2017 | Seoul | South Korea | Jamsil Indoor Stadium | 12,000 |

== Dlwlrma ==
Dlwlrma
- Tour by IU
- Location: Asia
- Start date: October 28, 2018
- End date: January 5, 2019
- No. of shows: 10

IU concert chronology
- Palette (2017); Dlwlrma (2018–2019); Love, Poem (2019)

Set list in Singapore

Part 1

1. "The Red Shoes"
2. Cruel Fairy Tale"
3. "dlwlrma"
4. "Every End of the Day"
5. "Good Day"
6. "Between the Lips (50cm)"

Part 2

7. " Friday
8. "Meaning of You"
9. "Love" (Karen Mok Cover)
10. "Gloomy Clock"
11. "The Story Only I Didn't Know"
12. "Lost Child"

Part 3

13. "Twenty-Three"
14. "Glasses"
15. "Zeze"
16. "BBIBBI"
17. "Palette"

Part 4

18. "Marshmallow"
19. "Boo"
20. "Last Night Story"
21. "Hey (Rock Ver)"
22. "Merry Christmas Ahead"
23. "You & I"

Encore

24. "Through the Night"
25. "Dear Name"
26. "Leon"

Re-Encore

27. "The Shower"
28. "Heart"

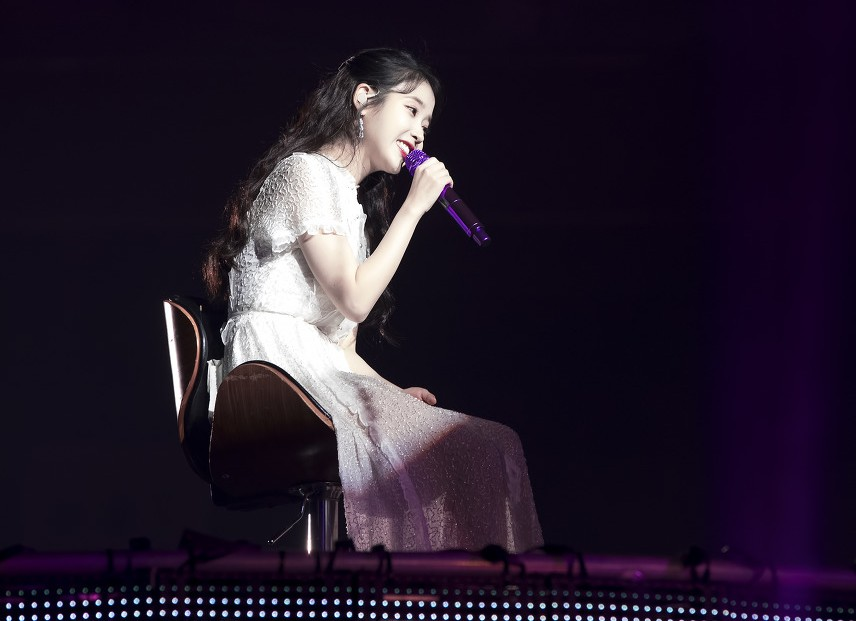
IU at her concert "dlwlrma", 18 November 2018 10

=== Tour dates ===
| Date | City | Country | Venue | Attendance |
|---|---|---|---|---|
| October 28, 2018 | Busan | South Korea | Sajik Arena | — |
| November 10, 2018 | Gwangju | South Korea | Universiade Gymnasium | — |
| November 17, 2018 | Seoul | South Korea | Olympic Gymnastics Arena | 24,000 |
| November 18, 2018 | Seoul | South Korea | Olympic Gymnastics Arena | 24,000 |
| December 8, 2018 | Hong Kong | China | AsiaWorld–Expo Hall 10 | 6,000 |
| December 15, 2018 | Singapore | | The Star Theatre | 5,000 |
| December 16, 2018 | Bangkok | Thailand | Impact Exhibition Hall 4 | — |
| December 24, 2018 | Taipei | Taiwan | Nangang Exhibition Center | 10,000 |
| December 25, 2018 | Taipei | Taiwan | Nangang Exhibition Center | 10,000 |
| January 5, 2019 | Jeju | South Korea | International Convention Center | — |

== Love, Poem ==
Love, Poem
- Tour by IU
- Location: Asia
- Associated album: Love Poem
- Start date: November 2, 2019
- End date: December 29, 2019
- No. of shows: 15

IU concert chronology
- Dlwlrma (2018–2019); Love, Poem (2019); The Golden Hour (2022)

Set list in Singapore

Part 1

1. "Unlucky"
2. "Palette"
3. "Autumn Morning"
4. "Friday"
5. "Secret Garden"
6. "The Visitor"

Part 2

7. "JAM JAM"
8. "Twenty-Three"
9. "BBIBBI"
10. "Hold My Hand"
11. "Last Night Story"
12. "Blueming"

Part 3

13. "Meaning of You"
14. "Knees"
15. "Hotel Del Luna" OST Medley
16. "Lullaby"
17. "Through the Night"

Part 4

18. "Sogyeokdong"
19. "The Red Shoes"
20. "Above the Time"
21. "You & I"

Encore

22. "Good Day"
23. "Love Poem"

En-encore

24. "Heart"
25. "Sleepless Rainy Night"
26. "The Night of the First Breakup"
27. "Someday"

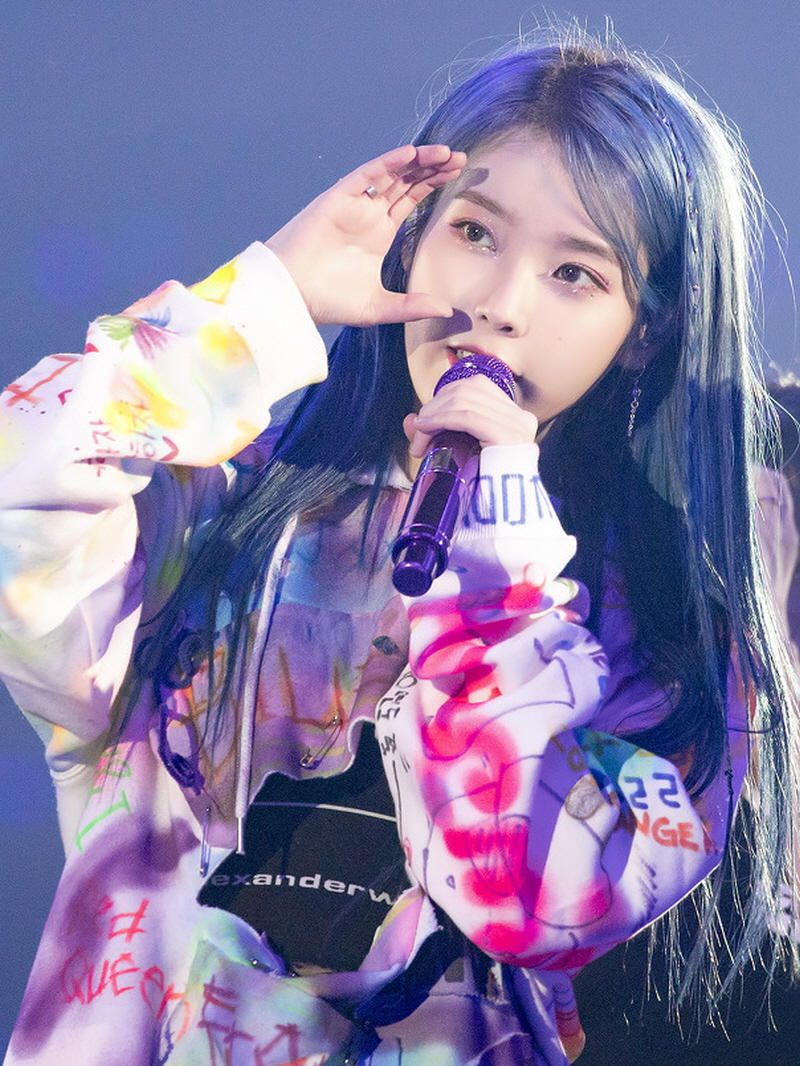
IU at 'Love Poem' concert in Seoul on November 24, 2019

=== Tour dates ===
| Date | City | Country | Venue | Attendance |
|---|---|---|---|---|
| November 2, 2019 | Gwangju | South Korea | Women's University Universiade Gymnasium | — |
| November 3, 2019 | Gwangju | South Korea | Women's University Universiade Gymnasium | — |
| November 9, 2019 | Incheon | South Korea | Namdong Gymnasium | — |
| November 16, 2019 | Busan | South Korea | Sajik Arena | — |
| November 23, 2019 | Seoul | South Korea | Olympic Gymnastics Arena | 30,000 |
| November 24, 2019 | Seoul | South Korea | Olympic Gymnastics Arena | 30,000 |
| November 30, 2019 | Taoyuan | Taiwan | NTSU Arena | 15,000 |
| December 1, 2019 | Taoyuan | Taiwan | NTSU Arena | 15,000 |
| December 6, 2019 | Singapore | | The Star Theatre | — |
| December 7, 2019 | Singapore | | The Star Theatre | — |
| December 13, 2019 | Manila | Philippines | Araneta Coliseum | — |
| December 21, 2019 | Kuala Lumpur | Malaysia | Axiata Arena | — |
| December 24, 2019 | Bangkok | Thailand | Thunder Dome | 3,500 |
| December 28, 2019 | Jakarta | Indonesia | Tennis Indoor Senayan | — |
| December 29, 2019 | Jakarta | Indonesia | Tennis Indoor Senayan | — |
| Total | | | | 90,000 |

== Other concerts ==
| Title | Duration | Associated release(s) | Region | Shows | Attendance | Ref. |
|---|---|---|---|---|---|---|
| IU Japan Premium Special Live | January 24, 2012 | —N/a | Japan | 2 | 4,000 | |
| IU Friendship Showcase — Spring 2012 | September 17, 2012 — October 15, 2012 | "Good Day" (Japanese version) "You & I" (Japanese version) | Japan | 5 | — | |
| IU Friendship Special Concert — Autumn 2012 | September 17, 2012 | "Good Day" (Japanese version) "You & I" (Japanese version) | Japan | 1 | 5,000 | |
| Modern Times Showcase In Hong Kong | March 23, 2014 | Modern Times | Hong Kong | 1 | — | |
| Just One Step... That Much More | May 22, 2014 — June 1, 2014 | A Flower Bookmark | South Korea | 8 | 3,600 | |
| I&U Fan Meeting | November 1, 2015 — January 10, 2016 | —N/a | Hong Kong, China, Taiwan | 4 | — | |
| IU Good Day China Fan Meeting Tour | July 9, 2016 – August 27, 2016 | —N/a | China | 7 | — | |
| IU 2025 IU FAN MEET-UP (Bye, Summer) | September 13, 2025 - September 14, 2025 | Bye Summer | South Korea | 2 | 23,600 | |
