= The Golden Hour: Under the Orange Sun =

2022 concert by IU

- Concert by IU
- Venue: Seoul Olympic Stadium
- Start date: September 17, 2022
- End date: September 18, 2022
- Duration: 3 hours and 30 minutes
- Supporting acts: Itzy; Jay Park
- Attendance: 88,000

IU concert chronology
- Love, Poem (2019); The Golden Hour: Under the Orange Sun (2022); IU HEREH World Tour (2024)

The Golden Hour: Under the Orange Sun (Korean: The Golden Hour : 오렌지 태양 아래) is a concert by South Korean singer IU. It was her first solo concert in three years since Love, Poem (2019). She became the first South Korean female artist to headline a concert at Seoul Olympic Stadium.

It won Stage of the Year at 2022 Melon Music Awards. The show was recorded and released on Blu-ray and DVD on August 11, 2023; it was distributed in South Korean theaters on September 13, 2023, and in 38 countries worldwide on September 28 and 30, as IU Concert: The Golden Hour.

== Background and promotion ==
On July 26, 2022, IU posted a teaser image featuring the text "The Golden Hour" and the tag "under the orange sun", lyrics from her 2020 song "Eight", on her social media accounts. In the image, she wears a sky-blue skirt, lifting one leg and seemingly soaring. In 2020, IU had announced that she would be holding a solo concert at the Jamsil Olympic Stadium in Seoul to mark the 12th anniversary of her debut; however, it was canceled due to the COVID-19 pandemic. To commemorate her 14th anniversary, IU and her fandom, dubbed "Uaena", donated 100 million won to pediatric and female cancer patients and 100 million won to young people preparing to become financially independent, for a total of 200 million won. Fans from various ages ranging from 10s to 60s came to the concert wore IU's signature color purple T-shirt, accessories and pants.

Outdoor advertising company Brand Power Station announced that it created a subway advertisement for the concert on Depot Station, a digital video advertising medium using 49-inch and 55-inch LED displays. On August 17, IU released a concert preview video titled "Strawberry Moon Concert Preview Clip", on her official YouTube channel. To commemorate the event, Woori Bank, a subsidiary of Woori Financial Group, provided a vehicle-type mobile store equipped with automatic teller machines (ATMs), etc. for financial convenience for those who visit the site during the concert. It was installed near the MD booths selling light sticks, and also held various events by operating brand booths and photo zones. On September 30, IU released a 4 minute video clip of the opening stage "Eight".

== Development ==
=== Ear problems ===
On September 18, IU had problems with her in-ear and replaced it, saying, "Unexpectedly, I felt that your shouts were definitely loud." On the same day, the singer also experienced hearing difficulties and struggled to keep her performance going as her patulous Eustachian tube worsened due to the extreme humid and hot weather. She revealed it at the end of the concert, stating her hearing started getting worse near the end of the performance of the day before, and that the rehearsal for the second day had been very problematic. She further explained, "I could barely hear during today's performance. It's not that I have a hearing problem, but it's difficult to monitor the main stadium."

=== Songs graduation ceremony ===
On the second day of the concert on September 18, IU made an announcement before performing her hit song "Palette". The singer said, "Today is the graduation day of a song that I love dearly. I wrote and composed this song when I was 25-years old, and it is a song that I have cherished and sang on stage. But after today, I plan on leaving this song with 25-year old Jieun. Without me knowing, I have now come to the age of 30, and so I hope to meet more precious songs at this age." She also announced that "Good Day" will also be graduating from her future setlist together with "Palette".

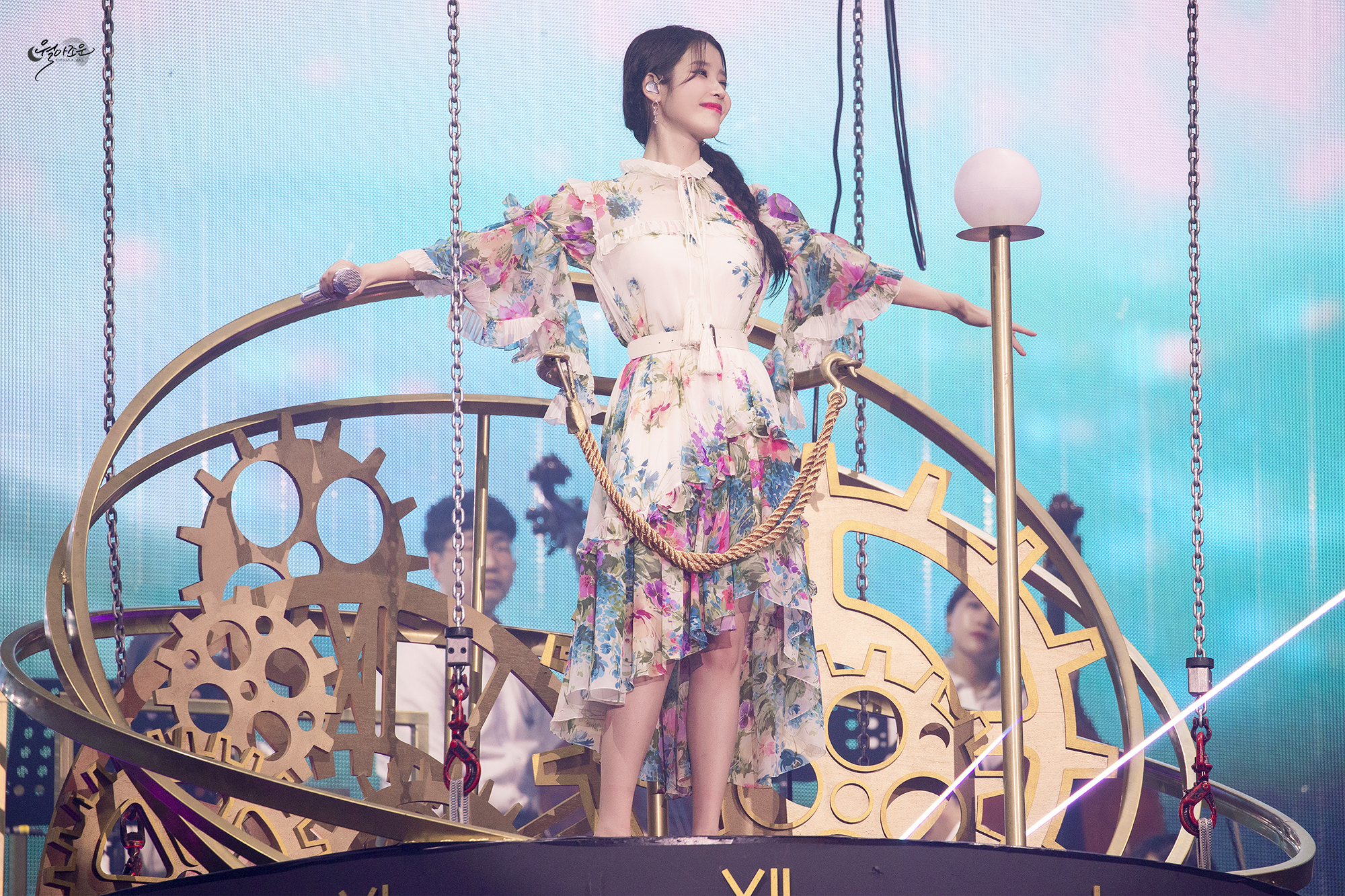
IU performing on September 18, 2022.

=== Stage setup ===
At the concert venue, IU's mother prepared a seat cushion for every seat at her own expense for showing her deep consideration for the fans who came to her daughter's concert. The cushion has the details of the concert date, location, logo, etc. The audience was able to take home cushions as souvenirs after the concert was over. She said: This cushion is a cushion that my mother placed an order for and prepared a month and a half ago. You don't have to leave it. Take it with you when you go home." The main stage was accompanied by live musicians such as guitar, keyboard, drums, percussion, and bass, and dozens of choreographers. It also featured the standard massive LED screens that filled the front of the main stadium, as well as official light sticks of IU's fan club held by over 40,000 spectators with mapping technology, the main stadium was filled with various colours such as orange, red, white, emerald, purple, and pink for each stage change and performances.

For the opening stage, IU performed "Eight" and "Celebrity" with a pink or orange sunset backdrop and colorful fireworks exploding during sunset. She addressed that she "always wanted to sing 'Eight' at sunset, so I planned it for a long time, and I feel good because it seems to have happened." IU performed in a pink hot air balloon during "Strawberry Moon" and "Hold My Hand" to ensure she could reach and interact with the audience at the 2nd and 3rd levels of the venue. During "Above The Time", hundreds of drones shown a variety of images by changing from the silhouette of IU, the logo of Uaena (the official fandom name), the watch, etc. The drone show could also be seen at Ttukseom Park, Hangang Park. At the end of the performance, there was a huge fireworks display and a drone show.

== Critical reception ==
Park Sang-hoo, a reporter from JTBC News named the 2-day concert the first and best live show and praised IU for writing "a new history in the Korean pop music world". Lee Eun-ho of Kukinews wrote about IU's performance, stating: "On this day, IU's expression changed several times. At times, her face was expressionless as if nervous, and at other times she laughed with excitement. When she fell deeply into the song, she also put on a sad expression. And after singing 'Above The Time', a satisfied smile finally appeared on her face. IU has feelings that cannot be expressed in words such as 'thank you', 'I love you' and 'I'm sorry'. You can even feel the love of the person sitting at the end of the concert hall." Kim Soo-jung of No Cut News analyzed the performance, stating: "As a solo singer, IU has to sing and decorate the stage by herself all the time – so the interval between her stage and talk was short. Instead, she explained in detail the song she just sang, the song she's going to sing, and what it meant, like a commentary. Thanks to this, both the audience who are familiar with IU's many songs and those who know only a few of her hit songs were able to naturally blend into the flow of her performance." Jeong Ga-young from Segye Daily acknowledged IU for "gradually growing into a representative Korean singer and the scale of her performances also gradually increased [from] the Olympic Hall and Gymnastics Stadium, [...] to the Olympic Main Stadium." She also added the reason why the performance was special was that "everything you see, hear, and feel, including hot air balloons, large-scale firecrackers, and drone shows, is made up of all-time highs." In addition, she praised IU for explaining the composition of the performance of each song. Herald Business Corporation's Seo Byung-ki highlighted in his article the 3 aspects of IU's performance that stood out – impressive stage interaction, boldly invested production costs that delighted the eyes and ears, and a concert that showed a lot of preparation. Similarly, Kim Won-gyeom of SpoTv News described IU "as an 'artist' with musicality is great and unique, and as an 'idol', the star quality is also great," and noted that her support from her fandom is "strong and it has high recognition and favorability among the public" which is a "unique presence in the Korean pop music world." He also called the event as a "bouquet to celebrate [...] 'The Birth of a Master' and the audience was the 'Coronation of the Master'."

== Commercial performance ==
According to Data Dragon, an analysis platform of TDI, a big data company, the number of vehicles arriving at Jamsil Sports Complex increased significantly during the 2-day show. The number of vehicles arriving at Jamsil Olympic Stadium on the 17th was 6,300, and the number of vehicles arriving on the 18th was 5,200. Compared to the number of arrivals, the average number increased by 1,300.

=== Ticket sales ===
The ticketing sale was split into two phases, a fan club pre-sale and a general sale. The fan club pre-sale began on August 8 at 8-11:59 pm (KST), while the general sale was held from 8 pm (KST) of August 11 to 11:59 pm (KST) on September 15. Online reservations could be made on Melon Ticket. Ticket prices ranged from 70,000 won to 165,000 won. On August 5, IU's label Edam released additional information regarding COVID-19 restrictions during the concert and illegal ticket transaction policy. Melon Ticket recorded over 340,000 waiting numbers during the general sales and around 30,000 seats, minus the approximately 57,000 seats that were sold to fan-club members on August 8, sold out in five minutes. Due to high demand, tickets for additional seats originally closed due to low visibility were made available for purchase, limited to one ticket per person per Melon ID.

The concert was attended by 88,000 people including Kim Soo-hyun, BTS' Jungkook and J-Hope, Tomorrow X Together's Soobin and Beomgyu, Lee Joon-gi, Kang Han-na, Woo Hee-jin, Kara's Kang Ji-young, Lee Joo-young, Kang Mi-na, Viviz's Umji, Kim Ho-young, Twice's Jihyo and Jeongyeon, T-ara's Park Ji-yeon, Yoo In-na, Kim Young-chul and Song Seung-heon.

=== Box office ===
The movie IU Concert: The Golden Hour drew over 85,000 spectators in South Korea and grossed over $1,500,000 (2 billion ₩) during its theatrical run.

== Set list ==
The following represents the set list from both shows:

1. "Eight"
2. "Celebrity"
3. "Dlwlrma"
4. "Every End Of The Day"
5. "Meaning Of You"
6. "Friday"
7. "Palette"

VCR 1

8. "Strawberry Moon"
9. "Hold My Hand"
10. "Blueming"
11. "Last Night Story"
12. "Good Day"
13. "Lilac"

Guest Performance & VCR 2

14. "Knees"
15. "Winter Sleep"
16. "The Story Only I Didn't Know"
17. "Through the Night"
18. "Last Fantasy"
19. "Above The Time"
20. "You & I"

Encore

21. "Love Poem"
22. "My Sea"

VCR 3 & En-Encore

23. "Ah Puh"
24. "Heart"
25. "Drama"
26. "Epilogue"

=== Guest performance ===
- During the first show on September 17, the guest was Itzy, who performed "Sneakers" and "Dalla Dalla".
- During the second show on September 18, the guest was Jay Park, who performed "Joah" and "Ganadara" with HolyBang & MVP.

== Shows ==
List of concerts, showing date, city, country, venue, attendance and revenue
Date	City	Country	Venue	Attendance	Revenue
September 17, 2022	Seoul	South Korea	Seoul Olympic Stadium	88,000	₩11.3 billion
September 18, 2022	Seoul	South Korea	Seoul Olympic Stadium	88,000	₩11.3 billion

== Personnel ==
Artists

- IU

Dancers

- Team Born Black

Band

- Cho Jae-bum (Percussion)
- Choi In-sung (Bass)
- Dongmin (Guitar)
- Jim Seung-ho (Drum)
- Hong So-jin (Piano)
- Kim Hyun (Keyboard)
- Lee Yu-mi (Background singer)
- Sohyun (Recorder)

Stage production

[KONGYEONTEAM]

- Co-Producer - Han Min-koo
- Producer - Kim Soo-jeong
- Producer Manager - Sim Hye-lim / Yoon Ju-min
- Assistant Manager - Kwon Hyeok-ji / Nam You-jo

[Motive Production]

- Art Director and General Director – Cho Hyun-woo
- Director - Yun Su-jin
- Assistant Director – Kang Seon-yeon / Lee Hyun-ji / Ahn Si-hyun / Park Ji-soo / James
- Technical Director - Kim Dae-hyun
- Stage Manager - Choi Jae-young
- Assistant Stage Manager - Lee Se-Wha / Ja Kyung-koo
- Stage Crew - Choe Su-hyeon / Kim Eun-ju / Kim Min-chae
- Writer - Seo Hyun-a

Concert organizers

- EDAM Entertainment

Ticketing partners

- Melon Ticket
