= I U (EP) =

EP by IU
- Released: December 14, 2011
- Recorded: 2008–2011
- Genre: K-pop, dance-pop
- Length: 24:46
- Language: Korean
- Label: East World

IU chronology
Last Fantasy (2011)	I U (2011)	Spring of a Twenty Year Old (2012)

I U (stylized as I□U) is the first Japanese extended play by South Korean singer-songwriter IU, released on December 14, 2011. It was IU's first release in the Japanese domestic market and was a selection of remastered versions from her original Korean discography of Korean-language songs released between 2008 and 2011.

== Background and development ==
IU first performed in Japan at two charity concerts for the 2011 Tōhoku earthquake and tsunami: Tokyo Densetsu 2011 (東京伝説2011) on May 15, 2011, and the Seoul-Osaka Music of Heart 2011 Fighting Japan! concert on June 8, 2011.

LOEN Entertainment signed IU with Japanese music label EMI Music Japan, now a sublabel of Universal Music Japan. Her Japanese debut was first announced on November 16, 2011, along with the announcement of the extended play. The album was a first step into the domestic Japanese market, and was marketed as a pre debut album. IU later debuted properly in Japan in March 2012, with a Japanese version of her song "Good Day" serving as her debut single.

The extended play was released 15 days after her second Korean-language studio album, Last Fantasy, was released in South Korea.

== Writing and production ==
The extended play features material mostly from 2010 and 2011, but also includes her debut song "Lost Child" from her debut extended play Lost and Found. "Nagging", a duet with Im Seulong of the South Korean boyband 2AM, is featured on the album, along with the single's B-side "Rain Drop". Neither song had been released on an IU album before. "Good Day" from Real (2010) and "The Story Only I Didn't Know" from Real+ (2011) also feature on the album. The title track from Last Fantasy (2011) was added to the album as a bonus track.

All the songs had English names except two which were given Japanese translated titles, "Nagging" which was called "Ko Go To" (コ・ゴ・ト; "Scolding") and "The Story Only I Didn't Know" which was "Watashi Dake Shiranai" (私だけ知らない; "Only I Don't Know").

The DVD of the single features a documentary entitled I with U: The Story of IU, directed by Kim Do-yeon. IU also worked with a Japanese design team on the photoshoot and the booklet.

Japanese versions of the songs "Good Day" and "Rain Drop" were released as her debut Japanese single on March 21, 2012.

== Promotion and release ==
IU held her first Japanese concert, IU Japan Premium: Special Live, on January 24, 2012, at the Tokyo Bunkamura Orchard Hall to an audience of 4,000. The concert consisted of five songs sung in Korean and English, along with "Good Day" sung in Japanese for the first time.

== Chart reception ==
The album debuted at number 15 on Oricon's albums chart, selling 7,000 copies. After charting for seven weeks in the top 300 albums, the extended play sold a total of 12,000 copies.

== Track listing ==
No.	Title	Lyrics	Music	Length
1.	"Good Day"	Kim Eana	Lee Min-soo	3:56
2.	"Nagging" (with Seulong, コ・ゴ・ト Ko・Go・To)	Kim Eana	Lee Min-soo	3:50
3.	"Rain Drop"	G. Gorilla	G. Gorilla	3:50
4.	"Lost Child"	Choi Gap Won	Lee Jong Hoon, Min Woong Sik	3:44
5.	"Only I Didn't Know" (私だけ知らない; Watashi Dake Shiranai)	Kim Eana	Yoon Sang	3:27
6.	"Last Fantasy" (Bonus track)	Kim Eana	Kim Hyeong-seok	6:10
Total length:				24:46

DVD
No.	Title	Length
1.	"I with U: The Story of IU"

== Chart rankings ==
Chart (2011)	Peak position
Japan Oricon weekly albums	15

=== Sales and certifications ===
Chart	Amount
Oricon physical sales	12,000

== Release history ==
Region	Date	Format	Distributing label	Catalogue codes
Japan	December 14, 2011	CD+DVD	EMI Music Japan	TOCT-22322
Japan	December 26, 2011	Rental CD+DVD	EMI Music Japan	TOCT-22322
