= Merry Christmas Ahead =

Song by IU featuring Thunder

from the EP Real
- Language: Korean
- Released: December 9, 2010
- Genre: Christmas
- Length: 4:28
- Label: LOEN Entertainment
- Composers: Shinsadong Tiger; Choi Kyu-sung
- Lyricist: Choi Gap-won

Audio
- "Merry Christmas Ahead" on YouTube

"Merry Christmas Ahead" (Korean: 미리 메리 크리스마스; RR: Miri Meri Kriseumaseu), also known as "Merry Christmas in Advance", is a song by South Korean singer-songwriter IU featuring Thunder. It is the sixth track on her third extended play (EP), Real, which was released on December 9, 2010. It entered the South Korean Gaon Digital Chart, peaking at number seven. In the following years, "Merry Christmas Ahead" became one of the most popular South Korean Christmas songs, re-entering charts each year in December. It was listed among the most successful songs of the 2010s by the largest Korean music streaming service, Melon. IU has performed it on television programs and has included it in the set list of several of her concert tours.

== Background and release ==
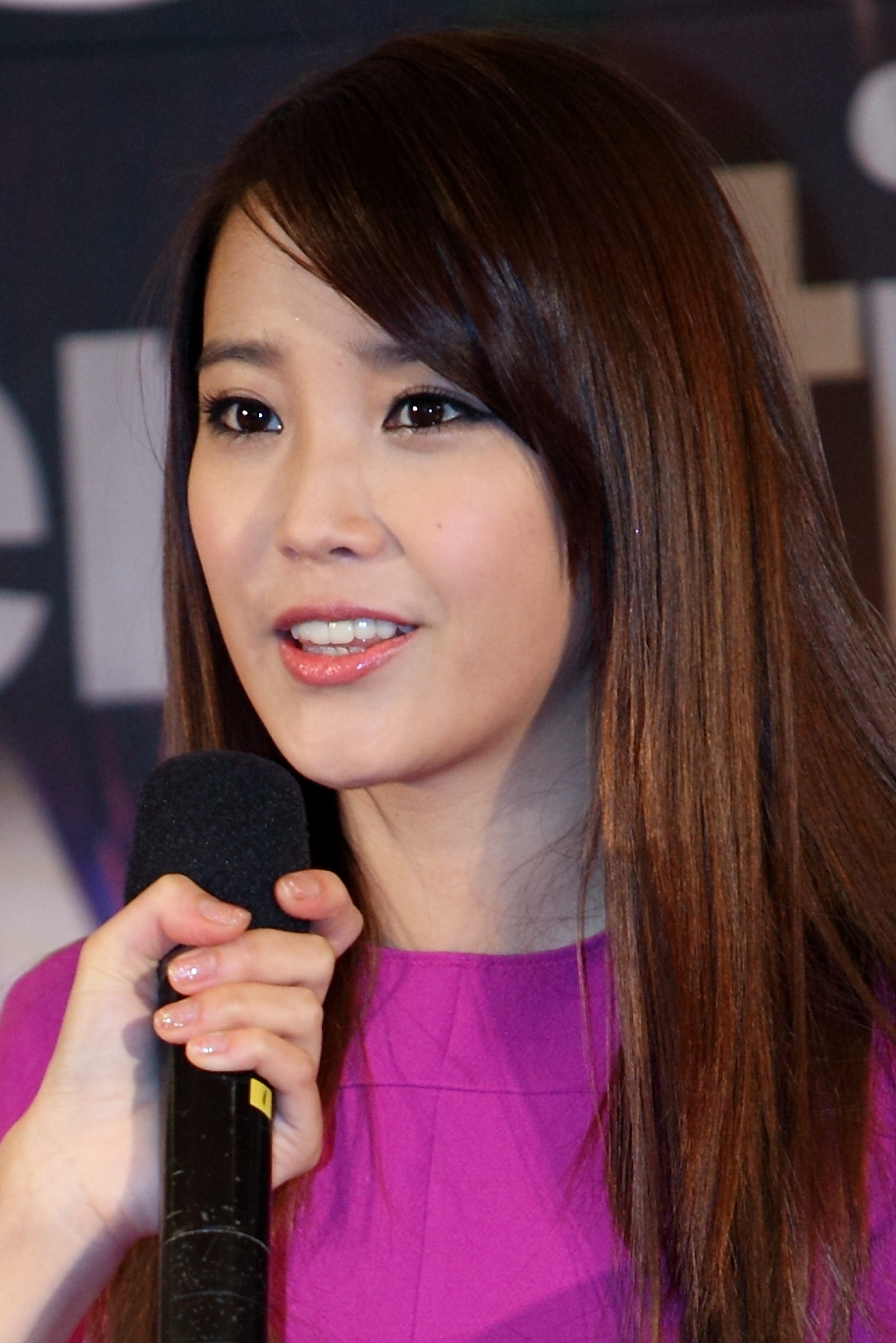
IU in 2010.

South Korean singer-songwriter IU had been gaining popularity in 2010 with the release of her collaborative hit single "Nagging" with Lim Seul-ong and her starring role in the South Korean variety show Heroes. On December 2, 2010, IU announced that she would release her third extended play (EP), Real, on December 9. The album peaked at number two on the Circle Album Chart (previously known as Gaon Album Chart) in the issue dated December 26, 2010 – January 1, 2011, and it has been retrospectively identified as the start of IU's rise to stardom, also thanks to the success of its lead single "Good Day".

On December 2, it was also announced that MBLAQ's member Thunder would feature on Real's b-side track "Merry Christmas Ahead". Written by Shinsadong Tiger, Choi Kyu-sung and Choi Gap-won, "Merry Christmas Ahead" is a Christmas love song, written as a confession from IU to her fans. IU stated that the song originally didn't suit her taste, but she came to like it. She said it is a "special" project to her since it features Thunder and Shinsadong Tiger, who had been her friends since they were trainees. IU said: "Sang-hyun oppa (Thunder), Ho-yang oppa (Shinsadong Tiger) and I were together when the three of us were nothing, but the fact that the three of us got together and did something makes me proud".

== Chart performance ==
The song debuted at number 24 on the weekly Circle Digital Chart (previously known as Gaon Digital Chart) in the issue dated December 12–18, 2010, and peaked at number 7 in the chart issue dated December 19–25, 2010. It debuted at number 10 on the monthly Circle Digital Chart in December 2010. Since its release, it has re-entered the chart every December (except for 2012 (Note: In December 2012, it charted at number 99 on the domestic monthly Circle Digital Chart.) and 2015), charting at number 61 in 2011, number 70 in 2013, number 23 in 2014, number 35 in 2016, number 55 in 2017, number 60 in 2018, number 49 in 2019, number 29 in 2020, number 32 in 2021, and number 42 in 2022, and number 44 in 2023. Twelve years after its release, it debuted at number 22 on the Billboard South Korea Songs in the chart issue dated December 31, 2022.

== Live performances ==
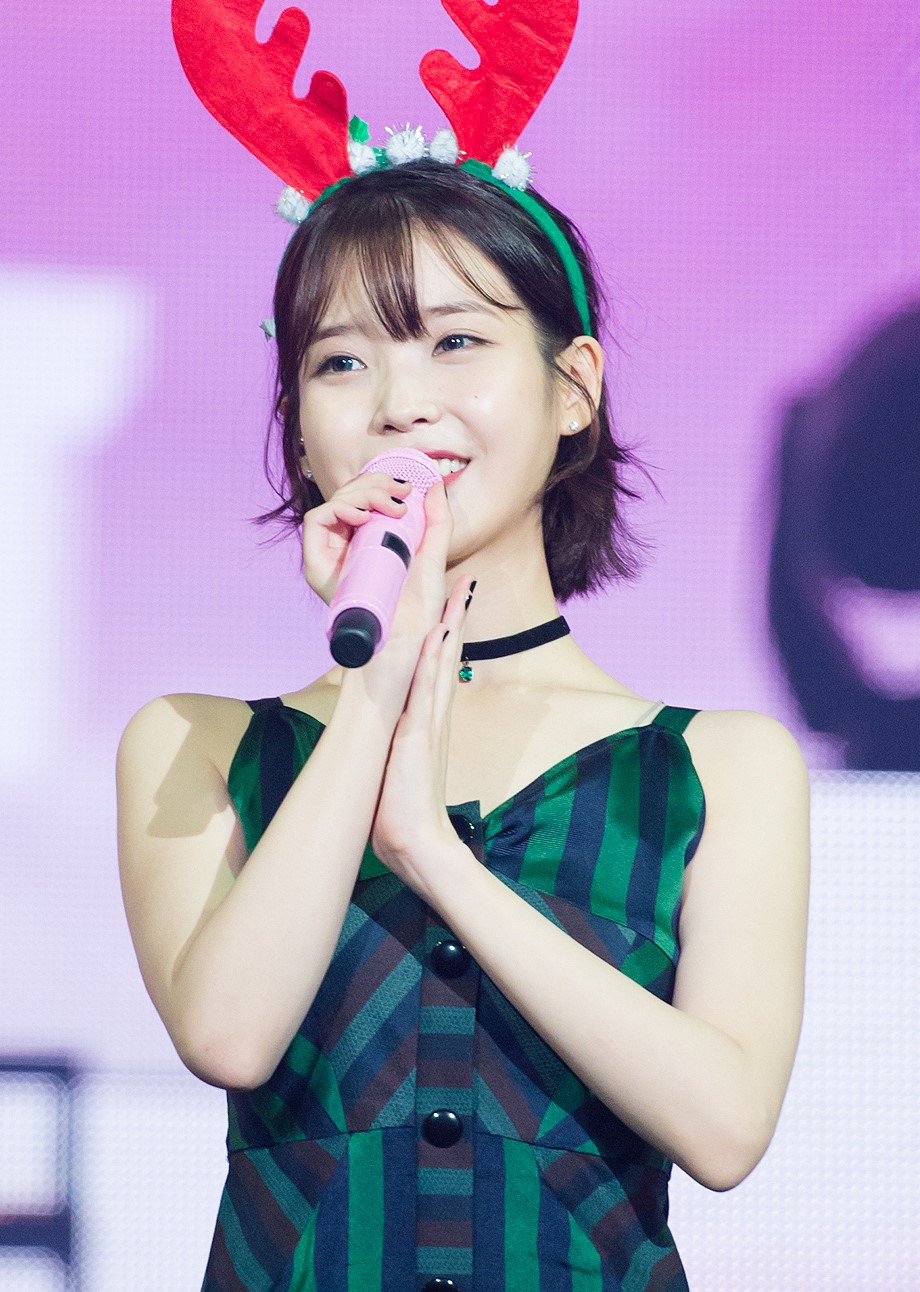
IU performing "Merry Christmas Ahead" at the 24 Steps: One, Two, Three, Four tour on December 3, 2016.

IU first sang "Merry Christmas Ahead" at MBC's Concert for Beautiful People (Korean: 아름다운 이들을 위한 콘서트), aired on December 18, 2010. After receiving several requests from fans, she performed it on the South Korean music show M Countdown on December 23, 2010. It was part of the set list of the singer's 24 Steps: One, Two, Three, Four tour (2016–2017), Palette tour (2017), and Dlwlrma tour (2018–2019).

== Legacy ==
"Merry Christmas Ahead" has become one of the most popular South Korean Christmas songs. Jung Byeong-geun of The Fact wrote that it has been "reigning as the strongest Korean carol ever" since it was released. The song has been nicknamed a "Christmas Zombie" since it manages to re-enter charts each year, despite the declining popularity of Christmas songs in South Korea. It has been compared to Busker Busker's "Cherry Blossom Ending" for its seasonal appeal and longevity on charts. Its acronym, Mimek (Korean: 미메크), has been used as an alternative way to wish a "Merry Christmas".

The song placed at number 18 on the list of the top 100 songs of the 2010s by streams and digital downloads released by the largest Korean music streaming service, Melon. It was the only Korean song to be featured on DJ Park Myung-soo's list of the top five carol songs, ranking third. Insight placed it on its list of IU's 14 most famous songs, released in occasion of her 10th debut anniversary. "Merry Christmas Ahead" has also been covered by multiple artists, including Laboum, Kim Se-jeong, Yoo Jae-seok, and Stray Kids.

== Charts ==
=== Weekly charts ===
Weekly chart performance for "Merry Christmas Ahead"
Chart (2012–2022)	Peak position
South Korea (Billboard)	22
South Korea (Circle)	7

=== Monthly charts ===
Monthly chart performance for "Merry Christmas Ahead"
Chart (December 2010)	Peak position
South Korea (Circle)	10

== Sales ==
Country	Sales
South Korea (Circle)	1,040,741 (Note: Sales figures since 2011.)
