= List of best-selling singles in South Korea =

This is a list of best-selling singles in South Korea since the Korea Music Content Industry Association (KMCA) began tracking sales figures for digital downloads in 2010. All singles listed here have sold at least three million copies.

Indie pop band Busker Busker's 2012 single "Cherry Blossom Ending" is the best-selling song in South Korea since 2010, with eight million copies sold as of 2021. Pop soloist IU has six songs on the list, the most of any artist.

== Background ==
In 2010, the Korea Music Content Industry Association (KMCA) established the Gaon Chart, a weekly record chart that tabulates both physical and digital music sales. Gaon first published digital download figures for songs in February 2011, when it released a list of the best-selling songs of 2010. On March 11, 2011, Gaon began publishing the weekly Gaon Download Chart, which included sales figures for songs. Gaon stopped releasing weekly sales figures for songs in 2018 and introduced a certification system that recognizes songs that reach at least 2.5 million downloads. The chart (renamed the Circle Chart in 2022) also periodically reports sales figures for songs released before the introduction of the certification system.

== List of best-selling singles ==
Song	Artist(s)	Released	Total sales (million)	Ref.
"Cherry Blossom Ending"	Busker Busker	2012	8.0	
"You & I"	IU	2011	7.0	
"Through the Night"	IU	2017	7.0	
"Moves like Jagger"	Maroon 5 ft. Christina Aguilera	2011	5.58	
"Friday"	IU ft. Jang Yi-jeong of History	2013	5.0	
"Wild Flower"	Park Hyo Shin	2014	5.0	
"I'm Not the Only One"	Sam Smith	2016	5.0	
"I Will Go to You Like the First Snow"	Ailee	2017	5.0	
"Gift"	MeloMance	2017	5.0	
"Spring Day"	BTS	2017	5.0	
"Shape of You"	Ed Sheeran	2017	5.0	
"You, Clouds, Rain"	Heize ft. Shin Yong-jae of 4Men	2017	5.0	
"Every Day, Every Moment"	Paul Kim	2018	5.0	
"Good Day"	IU	2010	4.8	
"Trouble Maker"	Trouble Maker	2011	4.46	
"I Miss You"	Noel	2011	4.45	
"Roly-Poly"	T-ara	2011	4.41	
"Nagging"	IU and Lim Seulong	2010	4.24	
"I Can't"	4Men ft. Mii	2010	4.21	
"Memory of the Wind"	Naul	2012	4.21	
"Party Rock Anthem"	LMFAO ft. Lauren Bennett and GoonRock	2011	4.2	
"Gangnam Style"	Psy	2012	4.04	
"Fantastic Baby"	BigBang	2012	4.04	
"Don't Say Goodbye"	Davichi	2011	4.02	
"So Cool"	Sistar	2011	4.01	
"The Western Sky"	Ulala Session	2011	3.93	
"Be My Baby"	Wonder Girls	2011	3.92	
"I Am the Best"	2NE1	2011	3.8	
"Hello"	Huh Gak	2011	3.8	
"Cry Cry"	T-ara	2011	3.78	
"Lovey-Dovey"	T-ara	2012	3.76	
"Yeosu Night Sea"	Busker Busker	2012	3.76	
"All for You"	Seo In-guk and Jung Eun-ji	2012	3.67	
"Having an Affair"	Park Myung-soo and G-Dragon ft. Park Bom	2011	3.66	
"I Turned Off the TV..."	Leessang ft. Yoon Mi-rae and Kwon Jung-yeol	2011	3.63	
"The Boys"	Girls' Generation	2011	3.62	
"Rolling in the Deep"	Adele	2011	3.61	
"Good Bye Baby"	Miss A	2011	3.6	
"Blue"	BigBang	2012	3.56	(Note: These figures include downloads from the Special Edition version of "Blue". Both versions are identical.)
"Loving U"	Sistar	2012	3.44	
"Alone"	Sistar	2012	3.42	
"Can't Let You Go Even If I Die"	2AM	2010	3.36	
"On Rainy Days"	Beast	2011	3.36	
"Dream Girl"	Busker Busker	2011	3.35	
"Bad Girl Good Girl"	Miss A	2010	3.33	
"Oh!"	Girls' Generation	2010	3.33	
"Ugly"	2NE1	2011	3.33	
"Heaven"	Ailee	2012	3.28	
"Fiction"	Beast	2011	3.26	
"Every End of the Day"	IU	2012	3.25	
"Payphone"	Maroon 5 ft. Wiz Khalifa	2012	3.15	
"If You Really Love Me"	Busker Busker	2012	3.13	
"Apgujeong Nallari"	Yoo Jae-suk and Lee Juck	2011	3.08	
"Hot Summer"	f(x)	2011	3.05	
"I Go Crazy Because of You"	T-ara	2010	3.04	
"Lonely"	2NE1	2011	3.04	
"Back in Time"	Lyn	2012	3.04	
"Starlight Moonlight"	Secret	2011	3.02	

== Best-selling singles by year ==
Below is a list of the best-selling singles by year, since 2010, based on the Circle Download Chart. As of 2018, the chart does not publish yearly sales figures, but it continues to rank songs based on downloads.

Year	Song	Artist	Yearly sales (million)	Ref.
2010	"Can't Let You Go Even If I Die"	2AM	3.35	
2011	"Roly-Poly"	T-ara	4.08	
2012	"Gangnam Style"	Psy	3.84	
2013	"Shower of Tears"	Baechigi ft. Ailee	1.88	
2014	"Some"	Soyou and Junggigo ft. Lil Boi	2.21	
2015	"Bang Bang Bang"	BigBang	1.58	
2016	"Rough"	GFriend	1.9	
2017	"I Will Go to You Like the First Snow"	Ailee	2.49	
2018	"Love Scenario"	iKon	—N/a	
2019	"2002"	Anne-Marie	—N/a	
2020	"Any Song"	Zico	—N/a	
2021	"My Starry Love"	Lim Young-woong	—N/a	
2022	"If We Ever Meet Again"	Lim Young-woong	—N/a	
2023	"Grain of Sand"	Lim Young-woong	—N/a	
2024	"Warmth"	Lim Young-woong	—N/a	
2025	"Heavenly Ever After"	Lim Young-woong	—N/a	

== Artists with highest count of best-selling singles ==
#	Artist	Count	Songs
1st	IU	6 songs	"You & I" "Through the Night" "Good Day" "Nagging" "Every End of the Day" "Friday"
2nd	Busker Busker	4 songs	"Cherry Blossom Ending" "Yeosu Night Sea" "Dream Girl" "If You Really Love Me"
2nd	T-ara	4 songs	"Roly-Poly" "Lovey-Dovey" "Cry Cry" "I Go Crazy Because of You"
3rd	Sistar	3 songs	"So Cool" "Loving U" "Alone"
3rd	2NE1	3 songs	"I Am the Best" "Ugly" "Lonely"
4th	Beast	2 songs	"On Rainy Days" "Fiction"
4th	BigBang	2 songs	"Fantastic Baby" "Blue"
4th	Maroon 5	2 songs	"Moves like Jagger" "Payphone"
4th	Miss A	2 songs	"Good Bye Baby" "Bad Girl Good Girl"
4th	Girls' Generation	2 songs	"The Boys" "Oh!"
4th	Ailee	2 songs	"Heaven" "I Will Go To You Like the First Snow"

== See also ==
- List of certified songs in South Korea
- List of best-selling albums in South Korea
- List of best-selling singles
