= List of Gaon Digital Chart number ones of 2011 =

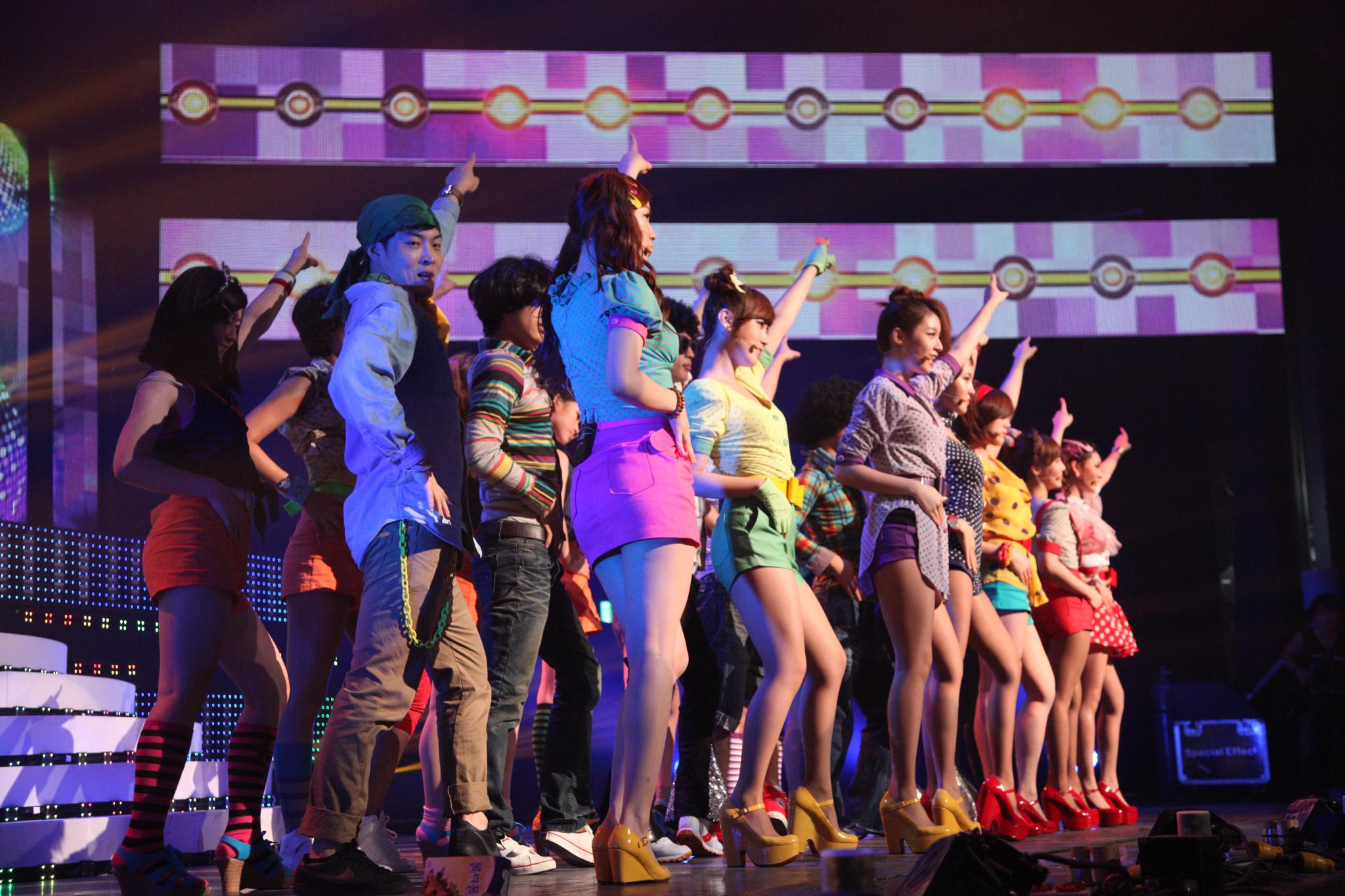
Despite not reaching number-one, T-ara's "Roly-Poly" landed atop the year-end chart for 2011, and was the best-selling song of the year.

The Gaon Digital Chart of Gaon Music Chart is a chart that ranks the best-performing songs in South Korea. The data is collected by the Korea Music Content Association (KMCA) and ranks songs according to their performance on the Gaon Download, Streaming and BGM charts. Below is a list of songs that topped the weekly and monthly charts. The actual overall best-performing song on the chart of 2011, T-ara's "Roly-Poly", did not top any weekly or monthly chart—becoming the first (and, so far, only) time this feat has happened in the chart's history.

== Weekly charts ==
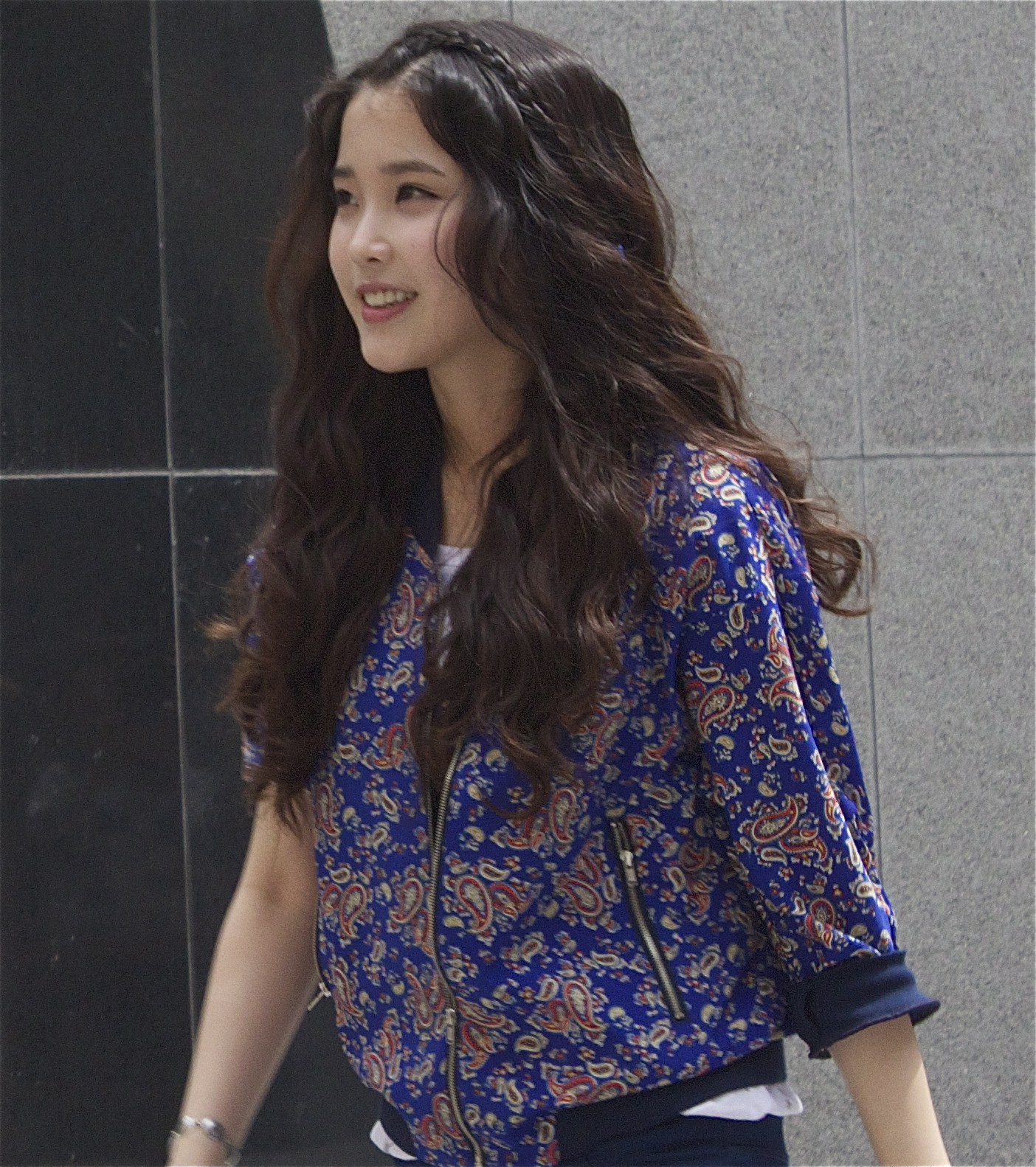
IU had 4 number-one hits in 2011, the most of any artist during the year.

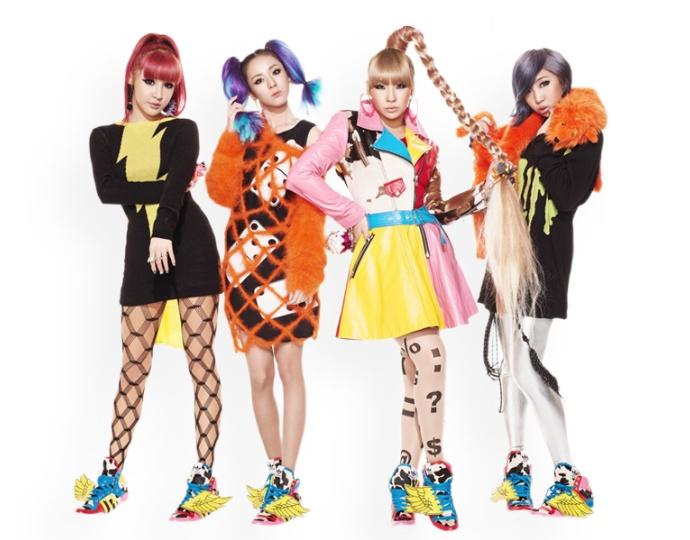
2NE1 had 3 number-one hits in 2011, with "Lonely", "I Am the Best", and "Ugly".

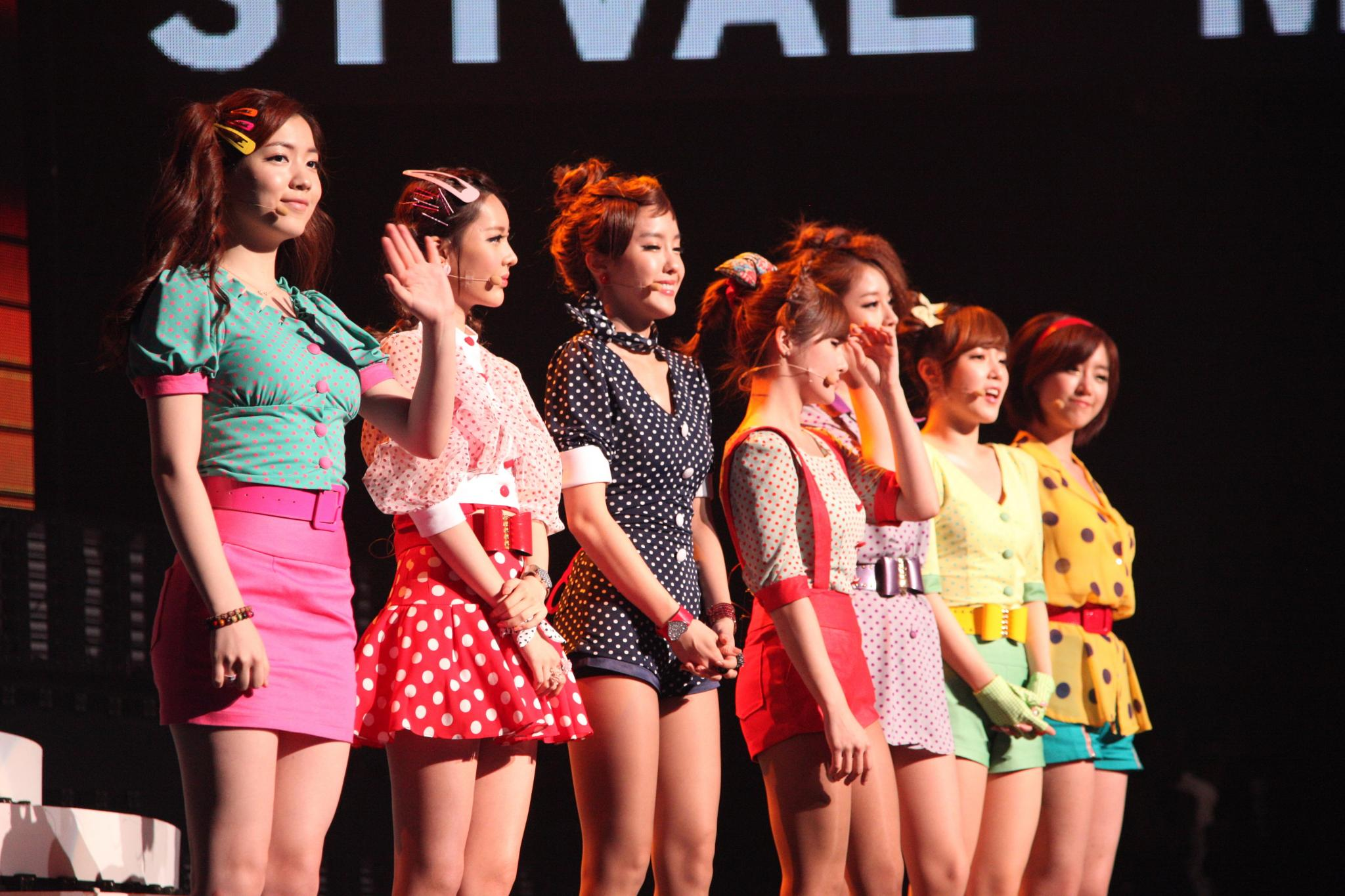
T-ara had 2 number-one hits in 2011, with "Cry Cry" and "We Were in Love", featuring Davichi.

Week ending date	Song	Artist	Ref.
January 1	"Good Day" (좋은 날)	IU	
January 8	"Good Day" (좋은 날)	IU	
January 15	"That Man" (그 남자)	Hyun Bin	
January 22	"For First Time Lovers (Banmal Song)" (처음 사랑하는 연인들을 위해 (반말송))	Jung Yong-hwa	
January 29	"For First Time Lovers (Banmal Song)" (처음 사랑하는 연인들을 위해 (반말송))	Jung Yong-hwa	
February 5	"Someday"	IU	
February 12	"Black & White"	G.NA	
February 19	"The Story Only I Didn't Know" (나만 몰랐던 이야기)	IU	
February 26	"The Story Only I Didn't Know" (나만 몰랐던 이야기)	IU	
March 5	"Tonight"	BigBang	
March 12	"Going Crazy" (미친거니)	Song Jieun featuring Bang Yong-guk	
March 19	"My Heart Beating" (가슴이 뛴다)	K.Will	
March 26	"Intuition" (직감)	CNBLUE	
April 2	"Please" (제발)	Kim Bum-soo	
April 9	"Please" (제발)	Kim Bum-soo	
April 16	"Love Song"	BigBang	
April 23	"Pinocchio (Danger)" (피노키오)	f(x)	
April 30	"Don't Cry"	Park Bom	
May 7	"Don't Cry"	Park Bom	
May 14	"I Hope It Would Be That Way Now" (이젠 그랬으면 좋겠네)	Park Jung-hyun	
May 21	"Lonely"	2NE1	
May 28	"If You Were Like Me" (나와 같다면)	Kim Yeon-woo	
June 4	"For 1000 Days" (천일동안)	Ock Joo-hyun	
June 11	"Don’t Forget Me" (나를 잊지 말아요)	Huh Gak	
June 18	"Coordination" (조율)	JK Kim Dong-wook	
June 25	"Hands Up"	2PM	
July 2	"I Am the Best" (내가 제일 잘 나가)	2NE1	
July 9	"Having an Affair" (바람났어)	GG (Park Myung-soo & G-Dragon) featuring Park Bom	
July 16	"Having an Affair" (바람났어)	GG (Park Myung-soo & G-Dragon) featuring Park Bom	
July 23	"Good-bye Baby"	Miss A	
July 30	"Good-bye Baby"	Miss A	
August 6	"Ugly"	2NE1	
August 13	"So Cool"	Sistar	
August 20	"I Turned Off the TV..." (TV를 껐네...)	Leessang featuring Yoon Mi-rae and Kwon Jung-yeol	
August 27	"I Turned Off the TV..." (TV를 껐네...)	Leessang featuring Yoon Mi-rae and Kwon Jung-yeol	
September 3	"Don't Say Goodbye" (안녕이라고 말하지마)	Davichi	
September 10	"Don't Say Goodbye" (안녕이라고 말하지마)	Davichi	
September 17	"Don't Say Goodbye" (안녕이라고 말하지마)	Davichi	
September 24	"Hello"	Huh Gak	
October 1	"Sixth Sense"	Brown Eyed Girls	
October 8	"Tokyo Girl" (동경소녀)	Busker Busker	
October 15	"Open Arms"	Ulala Session featuring Christina	
October 22	"The Boys"	Girls' Generation	
October 29	"The Boys"	Girls' Generation	
November 5	"The Western Sky" (서쪽 하늘)	Ulala Session	
November 12	"Be My Baby"	Wonder Girls	
November 19	"Cry Cry"	T-ara	
November 26	"Cry Cry"	T-ara	
December 3	"You & I" (너랑 나)	IU	
December 10	"You & I" (너랑 나)	IU	
December 17	"You & I" (너랑 나)	IU	
December 24	"Trouble Maker"	Trouble Maker	
December 31	"We Were in Love" (우리 사랑했잖아)	Davichi and T-ara	

== Monthly charts ==
Source: Gaon Monthly Digital Chart
Month	Song	Artist	Aggregate points	Total downloads	Year-end position	Ref.
January	"That Man"	Hyun Bin	–	–	39	
February	"The Story Only I Didn't Know"	IU	–	–	10	
March	"My Heart Beating"	K.Will	158,316,435	1,113,984	13	
April	"Love Song"	BigBang	146,984,191	1,098,775	27	
May	"Lonely"	2NE1	190,313,245	1,477,729	4	
June	"Starlight Moonlight"	Secret	143,129,339	1,373,180	15	
July	"Having an Affair"	GG (Park Myung-soo & G-Dragon) feat. Park Bom	268,055,358	2,623,583	2	
August	"I Turned Off the TV..."	Leessang feat. Yoon Mi-rae & Kwon Jung-yeol	134,997,784	1,524,068	23	
September	"Don't Say Goodbye"	Davichi	135,249,438	1,595,977	18	
October	"Tokyo Girl"	Busker Busker	135,234,443	1,831,105	52	
November	"Be My Baby"	Wonder Girls	171,813,840	2,186,473	33	
December	"You & I" (너랑 나)	IU	161,517,725	1,854,143	36	
