= Real (IU EP) =

EP by IU
- Released: December 9, 2010
- Recorded: 2009–2010
- Studio: Various
- Length: 26:38
- Language: Korean
- Label: LOEN
- Producers: Jo Yeong-cheol; Choi Gap-won

IU chronology
IU...IM (2009)	Real (2010)	Real+ (2011)

Singles from Real
- 1. "Good Day" Released: December 9, 2010

Real is the third Korean-language extended play (EP) by South Korean singer-songwriter IU. It was released and distributed by LOEN Entertainment on December 9, 2010. The special edition of the album was sold out during pre-order, which revealed the high anticipation for the album. IU collaborated with some of the top vocalists and producers in South Korea such as Yoon Jong-shin, Kim Hyeong-seok, Lee Min-soo, Kim Eana, Shinsadong Tiger, and Choi Gap-won to work on the album.

The album's success strengthened the singer's position as the "Nation's little sister" in her native country. In November 2019, Billboard magazine compiled a list of the 100 Greatest K-Pop Songs of the 2010s, with the single "Good Day" ranking at number one.

== Background and release ==
Real consists of six songs and an instrumental of the title track, "Good Day". The album came in two different versions, normal and special edition. IU had worked with composers of hit songs such as "Abracadabra", "Nagging", and "Irreversible" to develop this album.

== Composition ==
The album reflected the natural image of IU, as described by the album title. The title track "Good Day" includes a musical combination of violin, wind instruments, guitar, and piano. It also displays her powerful vocals. The lyrics describe a story of a girl who doesn't have the courage to confess to her crush, the sweetness and tension of a first love.

IU also tried out a new music genre, electronic, in this album ("This Is Not What I Thought"). Other songs in this album includes "The Night of the First Breakup", a story about the day of a panicking girl who just broke up with her boyfriend; "Alone in the Room", expressed the emotions of an 18-year-old girl as IU co-wrote the lyrics to this song; "The Thing I Do Slowly", a ballad that describes a girl trying to forget her love after a breakup; and "Merry Christmas in Advance", a confession from IU to the fans, which was composed by Shinsadong Tiger. It features rapping from Thunder, who has been friends with IU since pre-debut, and the tune is a love song which brings everyone love during Christmas.

== Promotion and reception ==
IU made her official comeback through KBS's Music Bank on December 10, 2010. As of 2012, the album has sold more than 85,000 copies. (Note: Sales for both standard and special limited editions are combined.)

== Track listing ==
Real track listing
No.	Title	Lyrics	Music	Arrangement	Length
1.	"Not Like This" (이게 아닌데; Ige Aninde, lit. Not Like This)	Kim Eana	Kim Hyung-seok	Yoon Woo-seok	3:07
2.	"What I'm Doing Slow" (느리게 하는 일; Neurige Haneun Il, lit. What I'm Doing Slow)	Choi Gap-won	PJ, Min Woong-shik	Kim Jin-hoon	4:13
3.	"Good Day" (좋은 날; Joeun Nal)	Kim Eana	Lee Min-soo	Lee Min-soo	3:53
4.	"The Night of the First Breakup" (첫 이별 그날 밤; Cheot Ibyeol Geunal Bam)	Yoon Jong-shin	Yoon Jong-shin	Jo Jung-chi	4:26
5.	"In a Room Alone" (혼자 있는 방; Honja Itneun Bang, lit. Lonely Room)	Choi Gap-won, IU	Jeon Seung-woo	Jeon Seung-woo	3:58
6.	"Merry Christmas Ahead" (미리 메리 크리스마스; Miri Meri Keuriseumaseu, featuring Thunder)	Choi Gap-won	Shinsadong Tiger, Choi Kyu-sung	Shinsadong Tiger, Choi Kyu-sung	4:28
7.	"Good Day" (instrumental)		Lee Min-soo	Lee Min-soo	3:53
Total length:					26:38

== Credits and personnel ==
Recording and mixing

- Loen Studio – recording studio
- T Studio – recording studio
- Booming Studio – recording studio
- Musicabal Studio – recording studio, mixing studio
- K-Note Studio – recording studio
- Vitamin Studio – mixing studio
- W Studio – mixing studio

Staff

- Cho Young-cheol – producer
- Choi Gap-won – producer
- Myung-gap Son – recording engineer
- Young Seon – recording engineer
- Eun-sook Heo – recording engineer
- Young-hee Choi – recording engineer
- Il-ho Kim – recording engineer
- Ji-yeon Park – recording engineer
- Min-hee Kim – recording engineer
- Hyunjeong Ko – mixing engineer
- Junseong Jo – mixing engineer
- Seungwook Ko – mixing engineer
- Jeon Hoon at Sonic Korea – mastering
- Namgoong Chan – management director
- Jo Chun-ho – management director
- Bae Jong-han, Park Jeong-hyeon, Park Joo-won, Park Seong-woo – management assistants
- Kim Jin-myeong – A&R (repertoire)
- Kim Eana – A&R (repertoire)
- Oh Yu-kyung – A&R (repertoire)
- Hye-sun Park – marketing
- Si-won Park – marketing
- Soo-hyun Ahn – marketing
- Changsu Kim – alliance marketing
- Jeongmin Lee – administration support
- Hwang Soo-ah – visual director
- Choi Hye-ryun – stylist
- Kim Jeong-han – hair
- Goh Gyeong-gyeong – makeup

== Charts ==
=== Weekly charts ===
Chart (2010)	Peak position
South Korean Albums (Gaon)	2

=== Monthly charts ===
Chart (2010)	Peak position
South Korean Albums (Gaon)	3

=== Year-end charts ===
Chart (2011)	Position
South Korean Albums (Gaon)	33

== Release history ==
Region	Date	Format	Edition	Label
South Korea	December 9, 2010	CD, digital download	Standard Edition	LOEN Entertainment
South Korea	December 9, 2010	CD+DVD	Special Limited Edition	LOEN Entertainment
Worldwide	December 9, 2010	Digital download		LOEN Entertainment

== See also ==
- List of best-selling singles in South Korea
