= Sajik Arena =

Indoor sporting arena in Busan, South Korea

Coordinates: 35°11′32.35″N 129°3′37.91″E

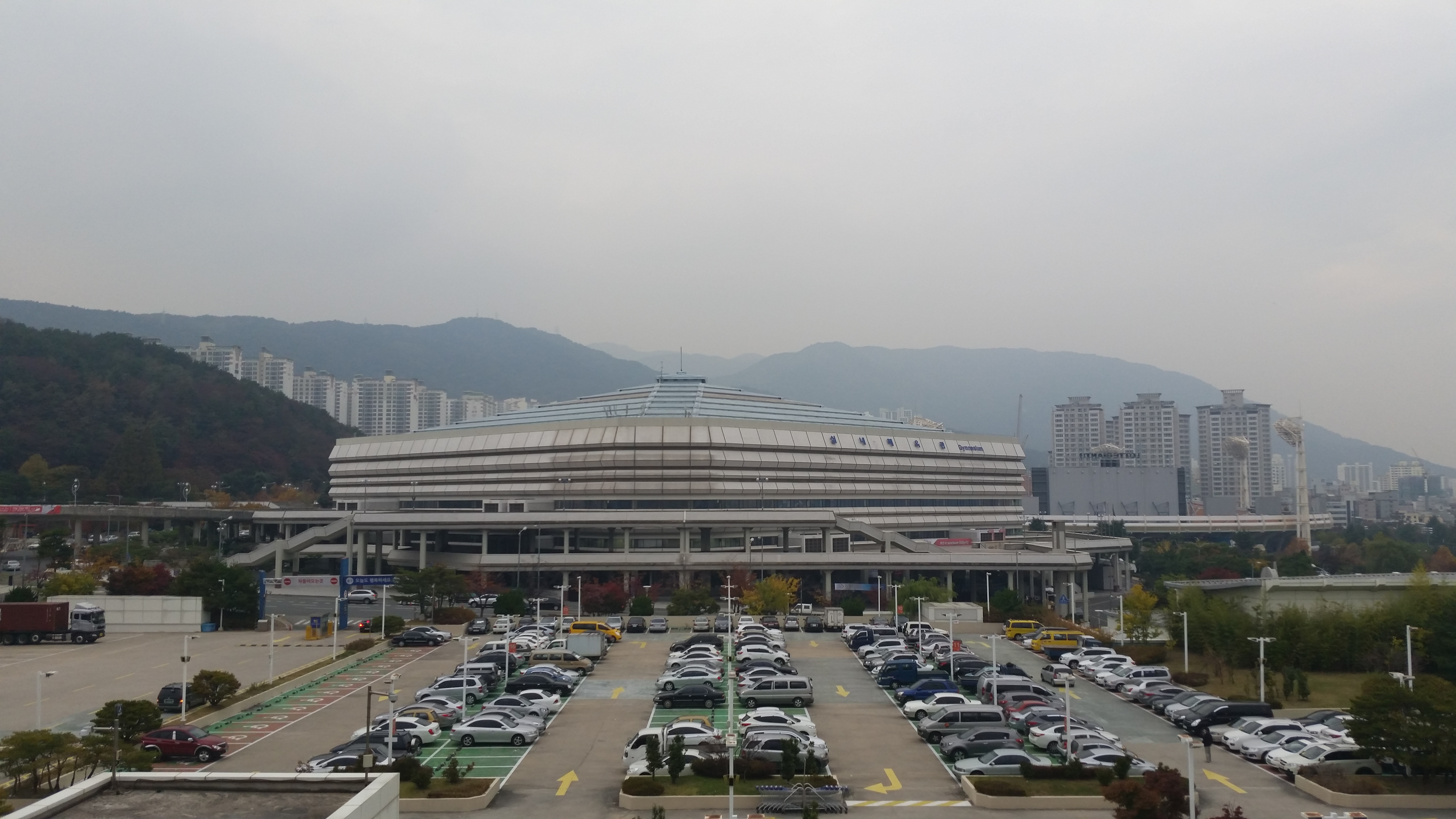
- Interactive map of Sajik Arena
- Location: Busan, South Korea
- Capacity: 14,099

Construction
- Opened: August 1985

Tenants
- Busan Kia Enterprise (1997–2001); Busan KT Sonicboom (2006–2021); Busan BNK Sum (2021–present); Busan KCC Egis (2023–present)

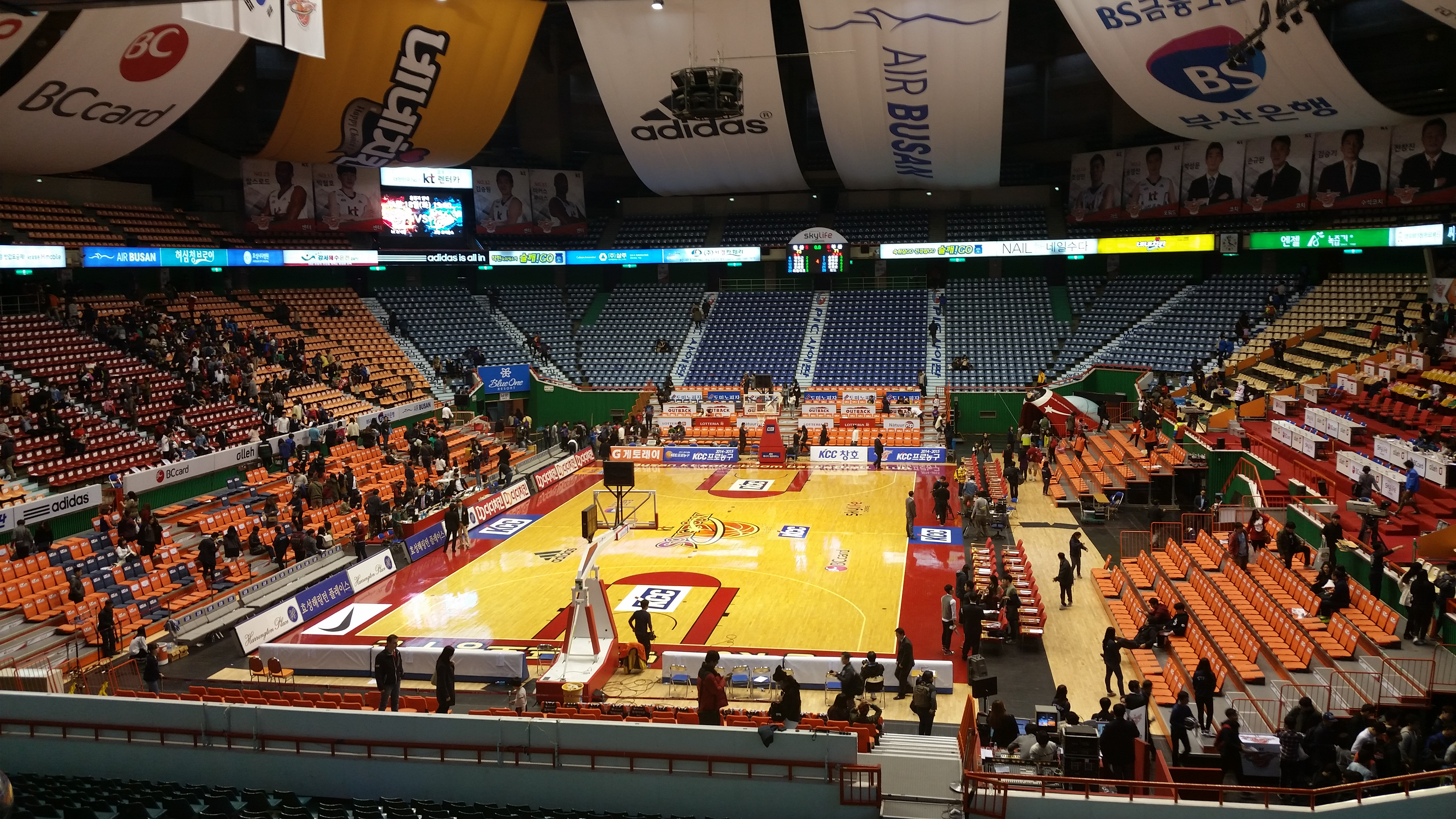
Interior

The Sajik Arena is an indoor sporting arena located in Busan, South Korea. Built in 1985, the seating capacity of the arena is 14,099. Until 2021, it was the home arena of the Busan KT Sonicboom basketball team. After Busan KT Sonicboom relocated to Suwon, the arena became the home of the Busan BNK Sum women's basketball team or Busan KCC Egis basketball team.

== Events ==
- 2012: American pop rock band Maroon 5's first concert of the third Korean tour, a part of Overexposed Tour.
- 2nd Asia Song Festival, organised by Korea Foundation for International Culture Exchange, in 2005.
- JYJ: JYJ Worldwide Concert – 11 and 12 June 2011
- IU: dlwlrma – 28 October 2018
- IU: Love, Poem – 16 November 2019
- 2023 League of Legends World Championship quarterfinals and semifinals
- 2025 LCK Road to MSI in Busan

== See also ==
- List of indoor arenas in South Korea
