= Last Fantasy =

Studio album by IU
- Released: November 29, 2011
- Recorded: 2010–2011
- Studio: LOEN Studio; T Studio; Realcollabo Studio; Music Cabal Studio; Jun Studio; Antenna Music Studio; W Sound Studio; Sonic Korea Studio
- Genre: K-pop; electronic; jazz; orchestral pop
- Length: 52:01
- Language: Korean
- Label: LOEN
- Producer: Shin Won-soo; Jo Yeong-cheol; Kim Jin-myeong

IU chronology
Real+ (2011)	Last Fantasy (2011)	I U (2011)

Singles from Last Fantasy
- 1. "You & I" Released: November 28, 2011

Professional ratings
Review scores
Source	Rating
IZM	3.5/5 stars

Last Fantasy is the second studio album by South Korean singer-songwriter IU. It was released and distributed on November 29, 2011, by LOEN Entertainment. The album features a total of thirteen tracks, including the lead single "You & I".

Upon its release, Last Fantasy was a huge commercial success, selling almost seven million copies of digital tracks in its first week of release. The total number of its digital sales surpassed the 10 million mark the following week. Meanwhile, the physical album has sold over 117,000 copies, making it the 15th best-selling Korean album of 2011. (Note: Sales for both standard and limited editions are combined.)

The album's lead single "You & I" debuted at the top of the Gaon Singles Chart, with a massive first-week digital sales of 1,129,761 units. It stayed at the summit for two more weeks. The song also hit the pole position on the Billboard Korea K-Pop Hot 100 for five consecutive weeks, becoming IU's first Korea K-Pop Hot 100 topper and the longest running number-one song on the chart. The record was held until tied with Psy's "Gangnam Style" and later broken by Lee Seung-gi's "Return", which earned six weeks at the top spot from December 2012 to January 2013.

== Background ==
Last Fantasy was meant to reflect the period in the IU's life where she bids farewell to her childhood and prepares to meet maturity. In this album, IU collaborated with singer-songwriters like Yoon Sang, Kim Kwang-jin, Lee Juck, Kim Hyeon-cheol, and Ra.D.

Some of the songs in the album were composed and written by IU herself, with help from artists like Lee Juck, Kim Hyeon-cheol, Yoon Sang, Yoon Jong-shin, G. Gorilla, and Corinne Bailey Rae. Her agency, LOEN Entertainment stated, "The album has been worked on for a long time, and the exclusive content included in the special limited edition will enable fans to better understand the album production process. It's a special gift from IU to those fans who have waited a long time."

On December 3, 2011, she started off her first week of promotions through SBS's Inkigayo. IU performed "A Child Searching for Stars" and the lead track "You & I". Both of the tracks showcased her youthful charm and sweet musicality, which gained a richer depth during her hiatus.

== Music videos ==
On November 28, 2011, the music video for "You & I" was released through LOEN Entertainment's official YouTube channel one day before the album's release in stores. The music video (starring actor Lee Hyun-woo) brings out elements of fantasy and ties it together with a well-crafted story.

On February 9, 2012, her agency uploaded a music video for the song "Last Fantasy" through its official YouTube channel. The video contains footage from IU's Japanese debut showcase "IU Japan Special Premium Live" held at the Bunkamura Orchard Hall on January 24. This is a special gift for her fans, as the video reveals not only footage from the showcase, but also includes clips of IU touring the cities of Japan and her everyday promotions and activities.

== Awards and nominations ==
Awards and nominations for Last Fantasy
Year	Award	Category	Result
2012	21st Seoul Music Awards	Best Album Award	Won
2012	9th Korean Music Awards	Best Pop Album	Nominated

== Track listing ==
Last Fantasy track listing
No.	Title	Lyrics	Music	Arrangement	Length
1.	"Secret" (비밀; Bimil)	Kim Eana	Jeong Seok-won	Jeong Seok-won	4:04
2.	"Sleeping Prince" (잠자는 숲 속의 왕자; Jamjaneun Sup Sogui Wangja, featuring Yoon Sang)	Park Chang-hak	Yoon Sang	Haihm	3:34
3.	"Holding a Star in My Heart" (별을 찾는 아이; Byeoreul Chatneun Ai, featuring Kim Kwang-jin)	Heo Seung-kyung	Kim Kwang-jin	Park Yong-jun	3:58
4.	"You & I" (너랑 나; Neorang Na)	Kim Eana	Lee Min-soo	Lee Min-soo	3:59
5.	"Wallpaper Pattern" (벽지무늬; Byeokjimunui)	Yoon Jong-shin	Yoon Jong-shin, Lee Geun-ho	Jeong Seok-won	3:40
6.	"Uncle" (삼촌; Samchon, featuring Lee Juck)	IU, Lee Juck	Lee Juck	Lee Juck, Yang Se-on	3:24
7.	"Wisdom Tooth" (사랑니; Sarangni)	G. Gorilla, IU	G. Gorilla	G. Gorilla	3:33
8.	"Everything's Alright" (featuring Kim Hyeon-cheol)	Kim Hyeon-cheol, IU	Kim Hyeon-cheol	Kwon Tae-eun	3:33
9.	"Last Fantasy"	Kim Eana	Kim Hyeong-seok	Kim Hyeong-seok, Ryu Young-min	6:07
10.	"Teacher" (featuring Ra.D)	IU, Ra.D	Ra.D	Ra.D	4:01
11.	"The Abandoned" (길 잃은 강아지; Gil Ireun Gang-aji)	IU	IU	G. Gorilla	3:14
12.	"4AM"	IU	Corinne Bailey Rae	Corinne Bailey Rae	3:02
13.	"L'Amant" (라망; Ramang)	Jung Jae-hyung	Jung Jae-hyung	Jung Jae-hyung	5:52
Total length:					52:01

Notes

- Track 2 is a cover version of the song under the same title, which was originally performed by South Korean pop duo Halo, from their first and final studio album released in 1997.
- The title of track 13 means "The Lover" in French.

== Credits and personnel ==
Recording

- LOEN Studio – recording studio
- T Studio – recording studio
- Realcollabo Studio – recording studio
- Music Cabal Studio – recording studio
- Jun Studio – recording studio
- Antenna Music Studio – recording studio
- W Sound Studio – recording studio
- Sonic Korea Studio – recording studio

Staff

- Youngcheol Jo – producer
- Jinmyeong Kim – co-producer
- Myunggap Son (Loen Studio) – house engineer
- Myeong-gap Son (Loen Studio) – recording engineer
- Lee Myeong-sook (T Studio) – recording engineer
- Heo Eun-sook (W Sound) – recording engineer
- Ra.D (Realcollabo) – recording engineer
- Yangsu Noh (T Studio) – mixing engineer
- Hangu Kim (W Sound) – mixing engineer
- Junseong Jo (W Sound) – mixing engineer
- Hyeonjeong Go (Musicabal Studio) – mixing engineer
- Eunjeong Kwak (Jun Studio) – mixing engineer
- Jeongoh Yoon (Antenna Music Studio) – mixing engineer
- Myeonggap Son (Loen Studio) – mixing engineer
- Ra.D (Realcollabo) – mixing engineer
- Jeon Hoon (Sonic Korea) – mastering
- Namgoong Chan – management director
- Bae Jong-han – artist manager
- Jo Choon-ho – artist manager
- Lee Chang-hee, Park Jeong-hyun, Park Seong-woo, Jeong Woo-kyung, Jo Gye-won – assistant managers
- Jinmyeong Kim – A&R
- Kim Eana – A&R
- Oh Yoo-kyung – marketing director
- Si-won Park, Soo-hyun Ahn, Hyo-shin Kim, Hee-yeon Jeong, Yong-hoon Seo – marketing
- Seongwook Jeong – performance director
- Hwang Soo-ah – visual director
- Barley – photography
- Choi Hye-ryeon – stylist
- Noh Joo-hee – assistant stylist
- Gwiae Kim, Kowon – hair
- Hyuna Lee, Kowon – makeup
- Hwang Soo-ah – music video director
- Kim Young-seok – executive supervisor
- Lim Yong-su – executive supervisor
- Wonsu Shin (LOEN Entertainment) – executive producer

== Charts ==
=== Weekly charts ===
Weekly chart performance for Last Fantasy
Chart (2011)	Peak position
South Korean Albums (Gaon)	1

=== Monthly charts ===
Monthly chart performance for Last Fantasy
Chart (2011)	Peak position
South Korean Albums (Gaon)	3

=== Year-end charts ===
Year-end chart performance for Last Fantasy
Chart (2011)	Position
South Korean Albums (Gaon)	15

== Release history ==
Release history for Last Fantasy
Region	Date	Format	Edition	Label
South Korea	November 29, 2011	Digital download	Standard	LOEN Entertainment
South Korea	November 30, 2011	CD	Standard	LOEN Entertainment
South Korea	December 1, 2011	CD	Limited	LOEN Entertainment
Various	November 29, 2011	Digital download		LOEN Entertainment
Japan	November 30, 2011	Digital download		EMI Music Japan

== See also ==
- List of best-selling singles in South Korea
- List of Korea K-Pop Hot 100 number-one singles
- List of number-one albums of 2011 (South Korea)
- List of number-one hits of 2011 (South Korea)
