= Real+ =

Single album by IU
- Released: February 17, 2011
- Recorded: 2010–2011
- Studios: LOEN Studio, Seoul, South Korea; T Studio, Seoul; Booming Studio, Seoul; Sonic Edge Studio, Seoul; W Sound Studio, Seoul; Sonic Korea Studio, Seoul
- Genres: K-pop; electronic
- Length: 10:29
- Label: LOEN Entertainment
- Producer: Jo Yeong-cheol

IU chronology
Real (2010)	Real+ (2011)	Last Fantasy (2011)

Music video
- "Only I Didn't Know" on YouTube "Only I Didn't Know (IU ver.)" on YouTube

Real+ is a single album by South Korean singer-songwriter IU. It was released on February 17, 2011, distributed by LOEN Entertainment. The single, a follow-up to Real (2010), consists of three tracks in total. One song on the release, "Only I Didn't Know", appears twice – the second time as a collaboration piece with pianist Kim Gwang-min.

== Background and release ==
The music video for the lead track, "Only I Didn't Know" (Korean: 나만 몰랐던 이야기; RR: Naman Mollatdeon Iyagi), features actress Park Bo-young as she is caught in a dramatic break-up story. Her ex-lover is played by singer-songwriter Yoon Sang, who also composed this piece as a gift for IU. The music video was released on the same day as the album.

The song itself is a departure from the pop-like sounds of her previously promoted song, "Good Day" (Korean: 좋은 날; RR: Joeun Nal). It features a mature combination of IU's striking high notes, vocals and orchestral instrumentation.

IU made her promotional comeback with "Only I Didn't Know" in the television show Music Bank (KBS) on February 18, 2011, two days after the album's release.

As of 2011, the album sold over 23,500 copies in South Korea.

== Track listing ==
CD/Digital download
No.	Title	Lyrics	Music	Arrangement	Length
1.	"Only I Didn't Know" (나만 몰랐던 이야기; Naman Mollatdeon Iyagi)	Kim Eana	Yoon Sang	Hwang Hyun	3:25
2.	"Cruel Fairytale" (잔혹동화; Janhokdonghwa)	Kim Eana	Saint Binary	Saint Binary	3:45
3.	"Only I Didn't Know" (with Kim Kwang-min)	Kim Eana	Yoon Sang	Kim Kwang-min	3:19
Total length:					10:29

Notes

- The titles of both tracks 1 and 3 literally mean "Only I Didn't Know".
- Track 3 is a piano version of "Only I Didn't Know".

== Charts ==
=== Weekly charts ===
Chart (2011)	Peak position
South Korean Albums (Gaon)	2

=== Monthly charts ===
Chart (2011)	Peak position
South Korean Albums (Gaon)	4

=== Year-end charts ===
Chart (2011)	Peak position
South Korean Albums (Gaon)	69

== Awards and nominations ==
=== Annual music awards ===
Year	Award	Category	Recipient	Result
2011	1st Gaon Chart K-Pop Awards	Song of the Year – February	"Only I Didn't Know"	Won

== Cover versions ==
- South Korean singer Lee Eun-mi covered "Only I Didn't Know" on the singing competition program I Am a Singer.
- South Korean singer K.Will covered "Only I Didn't Know" on Mnet's singing competition show Singer Game.

== Release history ==
Region	Date	Format	Label
South Korea	February 17, 2011	CD single, digital download	LOEN Entertainment
Worldwide	February 17, 2011	Digital download	LOEN Entertainment

== See also ==
- List of number-one hits of 2011 (South Korea)
