= Spring of a Twenty Year Old =

Single album by IU
- Released: May 11, 2012
- Genres: K-pop, Korean ballad
- Length: 11:34
- Label: LOEN Entertainment
- Producer: Jo Yeong-cheol

IU chronology
I□U (2011)	Spring of a Twenty Year Old (2012)	Can You Hear Me? (2013)

Music video
- "Every End of the Day" on YouTube

Professional ratings
Review scores
Source	Rating
IZM	2.5/5 stars

Spring of a Twenty Year Old (Korean: 스무 살의 봄; RR: Seumu sarui bom) is a single album by South Korean singer-songwriter IU. It was released as a CD single. The single has a double A-side hit singles, "Peach" (복숭아; Boksunga) and "Every End of the Day" (하루 끝; Haru kkeut) which was also released digitally, consists of three tracks in total, one of which was composed by IU. It is the singer's first Korean-language release since the full-length album, Last Fantasy, that was released six months prior.. The latter topped the Billboard K-pop Hot 100 for four consecutive weeks, making it IU's second number-one hit on the chart after "You and I". The single has sold over 34,400 copies in South Korea as of 2013.

== Release and promotion ==
The full CD was released on May 11, 2012. It contained the already-released "Peach", "Every End of the Day", and "I Really Don't Like Her" (그 애 참 싫다; Geu ae cham silta). The album was immediately successful; all three songs achieved the top 10 spots on the South Korean music websites Mnet, MelOn, and Olleh Music. "Every End of the Day" managed to achieve the number one spot on these websites.

The same day, the music video for the track, "Every End of the Day", was released. This 26-minute-long short film is done in a documentary style and features interviews with IU as well as footage from her previously mentioned trip to Venice. The song itself is a lively up-tempo song, that sounds similar to older pop music. The arrangement features string instruments. The lyrics and music video tell the tale of a girl who is deeply in love with a man that she hopes will make the first move.

One week after the album's release, the single, "Every End of the Day", managed to make it to the first place spot on the Billboard Korea K-Pop Hot 100 and topped the chart for three weeks in a row.

The final song on the album, "I Really Don't Like Her", is about a girl who resents a lost love for not giving her the attention she wanted. The song features an acoustic guitar and is done in an R&B ballad style.

To prepare for her first solo concert, "Real Fantasy", IU did not perform any broadcast promotions for Spring of a Twenty Year Old.

== Track listing ==
Spring of a Twenty Year Old track listing
No.	Title	Lyrics	Music	Arrangement	Length
1.	"Peach" (복숭아; Boksunga)	IU	IU	G. Gorilla, IU	3:13
2.	"Every End of the Day" (하루 끝; Haru kkeut)	Kim Eana	Park Geun-tae, Kim Do-hoon	Kim Do-hoon	4:04
3.	"I Really Don't Like Her" (그 애 참 싫다; Geu ae cham silta)	Kim Eun-soo	Shim Eun-ji	Shim Eun-ji	4:17
Total length:					11:34

== Charts ==
=== Weekly charts ===
Chart (2012)	Peak position
South Korean Albums (Gaon Albums Chart) (with Peach)	3
South Korean Digital (Gaon Digital Chart)	1
South Korean Digital (K-pop Hot 100)	1

=== Monthly charts ===
Chart (2012)	Peak position
South Korean Albums (Gaon) (with Peach)	5

=== Year-end charts ===
Chart (2012)	Peak position
South Korean Albums (Gaon) (with Peach)	48

Songs weekly chart performance
Song	Peak positions	
Song	KOR	Hot 100
"Peach" (복숭아)	2	3
"Every End of the Day" (하루 끝)	1	1
"I Really Don't Like Her" (그 애 참 싫다)	15	12

Songs year-end chart performance
Song	Chart (2012)	Peak position
"Every End of the Day" (하루 끝)	South Korea (Gaon)	13

== Release history ==
Region	Date	Format	Edition	Label
South Korea	May 10, 2012	Digital download		LOEN Entertainment
South Korea	May 10, 2012	CD single	Standard Edition	LOEN Entertainment
Worldwide	May 10, 2012	Digital download		LOEN Entertainment

== See also ==
- List of K-pop Hot 100 number ones
- List of Gaon Digital Chart number ones of 2012
