= You & I (IU song) =

2011 single by IU

- Japanese regular edition cover

Single by IU

from the album Last Fantasy and You & I
- Released: November 29, 2011; July 18, 2012 (Japan)
- Recorded: October 10, 2011; April 6, 2012 (Japan)
- Genre: K-pop, orchestral pop
- Length: 3:59
- Label: Kakao M; EMI Music Japan
- Songwriter: Kim Eana
- Producer: Lee Min-soo

IU singles chronology
"Ice Flower" (2011)	"You & I" (2011)	"Peach" (2011)

Audio sample
- file; help

Music video
- "You & I" on YouTube "You & I" (Performance ver.) on YouTube

"You & I" (Korean: 너랑 나; RR: Neorang na) is a song recorded in Korean and Japanese by South Korean singer IU from her second Korean-language studio album Last Fantasy (2011). The Korean version was released on November 29, 2011 through LOEN Entertainment, and was written and produced by Kim Eana and Lee Min-soo, respectively. The song was a huge domestic success, achieving the top spot on the Gaon Digital Chart and went on to sell more 7,000,000 digital units by 2021. According to Gaon, "You & I" is the second best-selling single in South Korea since 2010, ranking only behind Busker Busker's "Cherry Blossom Ending" (2012).

In Japan, "You & I" was released as a standalone single through EMI Music Japan on July 18, 2012, serving as her second single in the country. It was physically distributed in three formats: a standard CD and two CD + DVD limited edition bundles. Commercially, "You & I" performed rather moderately in Japan compared to its performance in the singer's native country, where it peaked at number five on the Oricon Singles Chart and number eleven on the Billboard Japan Hot 100, selling 18,000 copies.

== Background and composition ==
The Korean version of "You and I" was released on November 29, 2011 as the lead single off of IU's second studio-album Last Fantasy through LOEN Entertainment. A Japanese version of the single was released in Japan on July 18, 2012. It was physically distributed in three versions: a CD-only regular edition and limited editions CD+DVD A and CD+DVD B.

The song was composed by Lee Min-Soo and written by Kim Eana. The song possesses a mystic and peculiar concept, with IU playing the role of a teenage girl traveling through time in order to reach the future to meet her boyfriend. Switching to and from the minor and major keys, the arrangement is noteworthy for its diverse and fantasy-like atmosphere, incorporating instrumentals that are rarely used in K-pop, such as the harp and horn.

== Reception ==
The song was a commercial success in South Korea, debuting atop the Gaon Digital Chart with first-week digital sales totaling 1,129,761 units. It stayed at the summit for two more weeks. The song also achieved the number one position on the Billboard K-pop Hot 100 for five consecutive weeks, becoming IU's first number one song on the K-pop Hot 100 and became the longest running number-one song on the chart. In the United States, the song marked IU's first entry onto the US Billboard World Digital Song Sales chart, peaking at number 3 in the week of December 16, 2011, and charted for six weeks.

== Music video and promotion ==
On November 28, 2011, the music video for "You and I" was uploaded to LOEN Entertainment's official YouTube channel, one day prior to the release of Last Fantasy. The music video stars actor Lee Hyun-woo and tells the story of a girl (played by IU) traveling into the future in order to meet her boyfriend. The 19 year-old IU is shown to live with Hyunwoo—a boy who has fallen into deep sleep—in a workshop inside a clock tower inherited by her grandfather. IU does not leave his side and while waiting for him to wake up, decides to make a time machine in order to meet him. Both afraid yet excited, the long-awaited moment arrives as she leaves for her time machine as the two miss each other. Hyunwoo wakes up the moment he reaches age 20.

IU promoted the song on several South Korean music programs throughout December and early January, including Music Bank, Inkigayo, and Music on Top. She received 10 music show wins during the course "You & I" promotions, including a "triple crown", or three total wins, on Inkigayo.

== Accolades ==
Awards and nominations for "You & I"
Year	Organization	Award	Result	Ref.
2011	Gaon Chart Music Awards	Song of the Month (December)	Won	
2011	Cyworld Digital Music Awards	Song of the Month (December)	Won	
2012	Melon Music Awards	Song of the Year	Nominated	
2012	Melon Music Awards	Netizen Popularity Award	Nominated	
2012	Mnet Asian Music Awards	Best Vocal Performance – Solo	Nominated	
2012	Mnet Asian Music Awards	Song of the Year	Nominated	

Music program wins (10 total)
Program	Date	Ref.
Music Bank	December 9, 2011	
Music Bank	December 16, 2011	
Music Bank	December 23, 2011	
Music Bank	December 30, 2011	
Music Bank	January 6, 2012	
Music Bank	January 13, 2012	
Inkigayo	December 18, 2011	
Inkigayo	December 25, 2011	
Inkigayo	January 1, 2012	
Music on Top	January 12, 2012	

== Track listing ==
Korean version
No.	Title	Lyrics	Music	Length
1.	"You & I" (너랑 나; Neorang Na)	Kim Eana	Lee Min-soo	3:59
Total length:				3:59

Japanese single (CD)
No.	Title	Length
1.	"You & I" (Japanese version)	4:01
2.	"Shounen Jidai" (少年時代; Boyhood)	3:50
3.	"You & I" (Instrumental)	4:01
Total length:		12:52

Japanese single (CD+DVD A)
No.	Title	Length
1.	"You & I" (Japanese version)	4:01
2.	"Shounen Jidai" (少年時代; Boyhood)	3:50
3.	"You & I" (FPM Technorchestra Mix)	5:41
4.	"2012年4月～5月全国5大都市にて開催された｢IU Friendship Showcase～Spring2012～｣の模様を追ったドキュメンタリー"
5.	"You & I –Making of Music Video-"

Japanese single (CD+DVD B)
No.	Title	Length
1.	"You & I" (Japanese version)	4:01
2.	"Shounen Jidai" (少年時代; Boyhood)	3:50
3.	"You & I" (Japanese Music Video)
4.	"Every End Of The Day" (Music Video)

== Chart performance ==
=== Weekly charts ===
Chart (2011)	Peak position
Japan (Japan Hot 100)	11
Japan (Oricon)	5
South Korea (Gaon)	1
South Korea (K-pop Hot 100)	1
US World Digital Song Sales (Billboard)	3

=== Year-end charts ===
Chart (2011)	Position
South Korea (Gaon)	36

Chart (2012)	Position
South Korea (Gaon)	57

== Sales ==
Country	Sales amount
South Korea	7,000,000
Japan (physical single)	18,068

== Release history ==
Release dates and formats
Region	Date	Format	Label	Ref.
Various	November 29, 2011	Digital download; streaming	LOEN Entertainment	
Japan	July 18, 2012	CD single	EMI Music Japan	
Japan	July 18, 2012	CD + DVD	EMI Music Japan	
