= Peach (IU song) =

Single by IU

from the album Spring of a Twenty Year Old
- A-side: "Every End of the Day"
- Released: May 4, 2012
- Genre: Acoustic, Korean ballad
- Length: 3:10
- Label: LOEN Entertainment
- Songwriter: IU
- Producer: Jo Young-chul

IU singles chronology
"You and I" (2011)	"Peach" / "Every End of the Day" (2012)	"Sea of Moonlight" (2012)

Music video
- "Every End of the Day" on YouTube

"Peach" (Korean: 복숭아; RR: Boksunga) is a song by South Korean singer-songwriter IU. It was released as a double A-side single titled Spring of a Twenty Year Old (스무 살의 봄; Seumusal-ui Bom), coupled with "Every End of the Day". Prior to its physical release, it was pre-released as digital single on May 4, 2012. The song was a success in Korean music charts.

== Background ==
On May 1, 2012, IU posted a hand-drawn picture of a peach to her official Twitter account, which she described as "racy". Not known to fans at that time, this was actually the first information regarding IU's upcoming Spring of a Twenty Year Old album. A video teaser for the song "Peach" (복숭아; Boksung-a) was revealed the following day. The teaser ended with another hand-drawn image of a peach. Later, on the May 22 episode of SBS's Strong Heart, IU revealed that her label had requested for her to draw an image for the "Peach" teaser. She decided to draw a peach which also resembled a heart; however, her initial attempt, the "racy" peach, was rejected as it was "too risque".

The teaser video also shows footage of IU singing and playing guitar as she writes the song. The text description of the teaser, uploaded on LOEN Entertainment's official YouTube channel, revealed the first details about the song. "Peach" is the third composition of IU, featuring an acoustic focus. The song title was named after IU's favorite word and fruit. The song's arrangement contains both the recorder and triangle, which IU played herself. In an interview with Cyworld, she revealed that she used these instruments as she felt that they represented childhood, which allowed her to create a playful atmosphere in the song. She also mentioned that the lyrics were written to convey the emotion one feels when looking at their lover and that she had put in special attention into portraying one verse of the lyrics from the perspective of a male thinking about a pretty girl, using f(x)'s Sulli as reference.

On May 4, 2012, the full digital single, "Peach", was released, preceding the release of the full CD single by seven days. The single was highly successful and achieved the number one spot on many South Korean music websites.

Following the release of "Peach", several video teasers were released onto LOEN Entertainment's official YouTube channel to promote the upcoming album and its associated music video. The teasers were themed to display IU's travels from Incheon, South Korea to Venice, Italy. One teaser in particular showed IU playing the recorder melody from "Peach".

The song re-entered music charts following Sulli's death.

== Awards and nominations ==
=== Annual music awards ===
Year	Award	Category	Recipient	Result
2012	7th Cyworld Digital Music Awards	Song of the Month – May	"Peach"	Won

== Charts ==
=== Weekly charts ===
Chart (2012)	Peak position
South Korean Albums (Gaon Albums Chart) (with Every End of the Day)	3
South Korean Digital (Gaon Digital Chart)	2
South Korean Digital (Korea K-Pop Hot 100)	3
US World Digital Songs (Billboard)	24
