= Good Day (IU song) =

2010 single by IU

- Regular and digital edition Japanese single cover

Single by IU

from the album Real and Good Day
- Language: Korean; Japanese
- Released: December 9, 2010
- Length: 3:53
- Label: Kakao M; EMI Music Japan
- Composer: Lee Min-soo
- Lyricists: Kim Eana (Korean); Emi Minakata (Japanese)
- Producer: Lee Min-soo

IU singles chronology
"Nagging" (2010)	"Good Day" (2010)	"Only I Didn't Know" (2011)

IU Japanese singles chronology
"Good Day" (2012)	"You and I" (2012)

Music video
- "Good Day" on YouTube

"Good Day" (Korean: 좋은 날; RR: joheun nal) is a song recorded in two languages (Korean and Japanese) by South Korean singer IU. The Korean version was released on December 9, 2010, as the lead single for IU's third extended play (EP) Real. It was written by Kim Eana, while production was handled by Lee Min-soo. The Japanese version was originally included on IU's first Japanese extended play I□U, released on December 14, 2011, before being released on March 21, 2012, as IU's first single album Good Day.

"Good Day" received generally positive reviews by music critics, with Billboard crowned it as the best K-pop song released in the 2010s. Commercially, the song debuted atop the Gaon Digital Chart, topping the chart for five weeks and becoming the sixth best-selling single in South Korea, selling more than 4.4 million digital units. The Japanese version reached the top five on the Oricon Singles Chart, and sold more than 30,000 physical copies in the country.

== Background and release ==
"Good Day" was released on December 9, 2010, simultaneously with the singer's third extended play (EP) Real. On November 15, 2011, Loen announced, that IU was signed to EMI Music Japan and was set to release an extended play with her greatest hits recorded in Japanese, on December 14, 2011, titled I□U.

== Music and lyrics ==
The Korean version of "Good Day" was written by Kim Eana, while production was handled by Lee Min-soo. In terms of musical notation, the song is composed in the key of A♭ major, with a tempo of 128 beats per minute, and runs for 3 minutes and 53 seconds.

== Reception ==
Writing for New Straits Times, Bibi Nurshuhada Ramli described "Good Day" as IU's breakout song. South China Morning Post's Sylvia Issa described the songs as a "unique musical phenomenon". In November 2019, Billboard magazine compiled a list of the 100 Greatest K-Pop Songs of the 2010s, with the single "Good Day" ranking at number one.

Commercially, "Good Day" debuted at number one of the South Korean singles chart on the 51st issued week of 2010. It topped the chart for five consecutive weeks, falling to no. four on the fourth issued week in 2011. The song held the record for the most weeks at number one until 2018, when it was beaten by iKon "Love Scenario". Furthermore, the single topped the monthly singles chart in December 2010. It was selected as Gallup Korea's Song of the Year in 2011.

"Good Day" on critic lists
Publication	List	Rank	Ref.
Billboard	100 Greatest K-pop Songs of the 2010s: Staff List	1	
Gallup Korea	10 Most Beloved K-pop Songs of the 21st Century	4	
Melon	Top 100 K-pop Songs of All Time	15	
Rolling Stone	100 Greatest Songs in the History of Korean Pop Music	3	
Star News	10 Best Digital Hit Songs in the Past 10 Years	No order	

== Accolades ==
Awards and nominations
Year	Organization	Award	Result	Ref.
2011	Cyworld Digital Music Awards	Song of the Month – December	Won	
2011	Melon Music Awards	Netizen Popular Song	Nominated	
2011	Melon Music Awards	Song of the Year	Won	
2011	Mnet Asian Music Awards	Best Vocal Performance – Solo	Won	
2011	Mnet Asian Music Awards	Song of the Year	Nominated	
2011	Seoul Music Awards	Best Song Award	Won	
2012	Korean Music Awards	Song of the Year	Won	
2012	Korean Music Awards	Best Korean Pop Song	Won	

Music program awards
Program	Date	Ref.
Inkigayo	December 19, 2010	
Inkigayo	December 26, 2010	
Inkigayo	January 2, 2011	
M Countdown	December 23, 2010	
Music Bank	December 24, 2010	
Music Bank	December 31, 2010	
Music Bank	January 7, 2011	

== Track listing ==
Digital download / streaming – Korean version
No.	Title	Lyrics	Music	Length
1.	"Good Day" (Korean: 좋은 날; RR: Joheun Nal)	Kim Eana	Lee Min-soo	3:53
Total length:				3:53

Digital download / Regular CD Edition – Japanese version
No.	Title	Lyrics	Music	Length
1.	"Good Day"	Kim Eana; Lee Min-soo; Emi Minakata	Cho Young-Chul; Hidenobu Okita	3:55
2.	"Rain Drop"	Natsumi Kobayashi; G. Gorilla	Cho Young-Chul; Hidenobu Okita	3:50
3.	"Good Day" (Instrumental)		Cho Young-Chul; Hidenobu Okita	3:55
4.	"Rain Drop" (Instrumental)		Cho Young-Chul; Hidenobu Okita	3:50
Total length:				15:30

Limited Edition A (CD + DVD + Booklet) – Japanese version
No.	Title	Lyrics	Music	Length
1.	"Good Day"	Kim Eana; Lee Min-soo; Emi Minakata	Cho Young-Chul; Hidenobu Okita	3:55
2.	"Rain Drop"	Natsumi Kobayashi; G. Gorilla	Cho Young-Chul; Hidenobu Okita	3:50
3.	"Lost Child" (Live version)			3:42
4.	"Rain Drop" (Live version)			3:50
5.	"Good Day" (Live version)			3:50
6.	"Last Fantasy" (Live version)			6:07
7.	"Aishiteru" (Live version)			3:34
8.	"Lovin' You" (Live version)			3:09

== Credits and personnel ==
Credits adapted from the EP's liner notes.

Studio

- Loen Studio – recording
- W Sound – recording, engineering assistant, mixing
- Booming Studio – recording
- Sonic Korea – mastering

Personnel

- IU – vocals
- Kim Eana – Korean lyrics
- Emi Minakata – Japanese lyrics
- Lee Min-soo – producer, composition, arrangement
- Kota (SunnyHill) – background vocals
- Sam Lee – guitar
- Yung – strings
- TST – brass
- Nile Lee – strings arrangement
- Kim Dong-ha – brass arrangement
- Son Myung-gap – recording
- Heo Eun-sook – recording, engineering assistant
- Kim Min-hee – recording
- Jo Joon-sung – mixing
- Jeon Hoon – mastering

== Chart performance ==
=== Weekly charts ===
Chart (2010–12)	Peak position
Japan (Japan Hot 100)	5
Japan (Oricon)	6
South Korea (Gaon Digital Chart)	1

=== Year-end charts ===
Chart (2011)	Position
South Korea (Gaon)	17

== Sales ==
Country	Sales amount
South Korea (digital)	4,450,508
Japan (physical)	30,634

== Release history ==
Region	Date	Version	Format	Label	Ref.
Various	December 9, 2010	Korean	Digital download	Kakao M	
Japan	March 21, 2012	Japanese	CD, Digital download	EMI Music Japan	
