= Nagging (song) =

Single by IU and Lim Seul-ong

from the album I□U
- B-side: "Rain Drop"
- Released: June 3, 2010
- Recorded: 2010
- Genre: K-pop; pop; ballad
- Length: 3:33
- Label: LOEN
- Songwriters: Kim Eana; Lee Min-soo

IU singles chronology
"Marshmallow" (2009)	"Nagging" (2010)	"Good Day" (2010)

Lim Seul-ong singles chronology
"Nagging" (2010)	"How We Feel" (2011)

"Nagging" (Korean: 잔소리; RR: Jansori) is a song recorded by South Korean singers IU and Lim Seulong. Written by Kim Eana and composed by Lee Min-soo, the pop ballad duet was used as one of the theme songs for the second season of the variety show, We Got Married, along with "I Happen to Love You" by Jo Kwon and Gain.

The song was released in South Korea on June 3, 2010, and was re-released under the title "Ko Go To" (コ・ゴ・ト) on December 14, 2011, as part of IU's first Japanese extended play I□U (2011).

== Release and reception ==
"Nagging" is a pop ballad. The song was a commercial success in South Korea. The single debuted at twelve on the Gaon Digital Chart and shot up to number-one position the following week, where it remained for three weeks.

== Awards and nominations ==
Awards and nominations
Year	Organization	Award	Result	Ref.
2010	Cyworld Digital Music Awards	Song of the Month – June	Won	
2010	25th Golden Disc Awards	Digital Music Bonsang	Won	
2010	2010 Mnet Asian Music Awards	Best Collaboration	Nominated	

Music program awards
Program	Date	Ref.
Inkigayo	June 27, 2010	
Music Bank	July 2, 2010	

== Track listing ==
Digital download / streaming
No.	Title	Lyrics	Music	Length
1.	"Nagging" (잔소리)	Kim Eana	Lee Min-soo	3:33
2.	"Rain Drop"	G. Gorilla	G. Gorilla	3:47
Total length:				7:20

== Charts ==
=== Weekly charts ===
Chart (2010)	Peak position
South Korea (Gaon)	1

=== Monthly charts ===
Chart (2010)	Peak position
South Korea (Gaon)	1

=== Yearly charts ===
Chart (2010)	Position
South Korea (Gaon)	2

== Sales ==
Country	Sales amount
South Korea (digital)	3,043,000
South Korea (ringtone)	490,000

== See also ==
- List of Gaon Digital Chart number ones of 2010
