= List of songs written by IU =

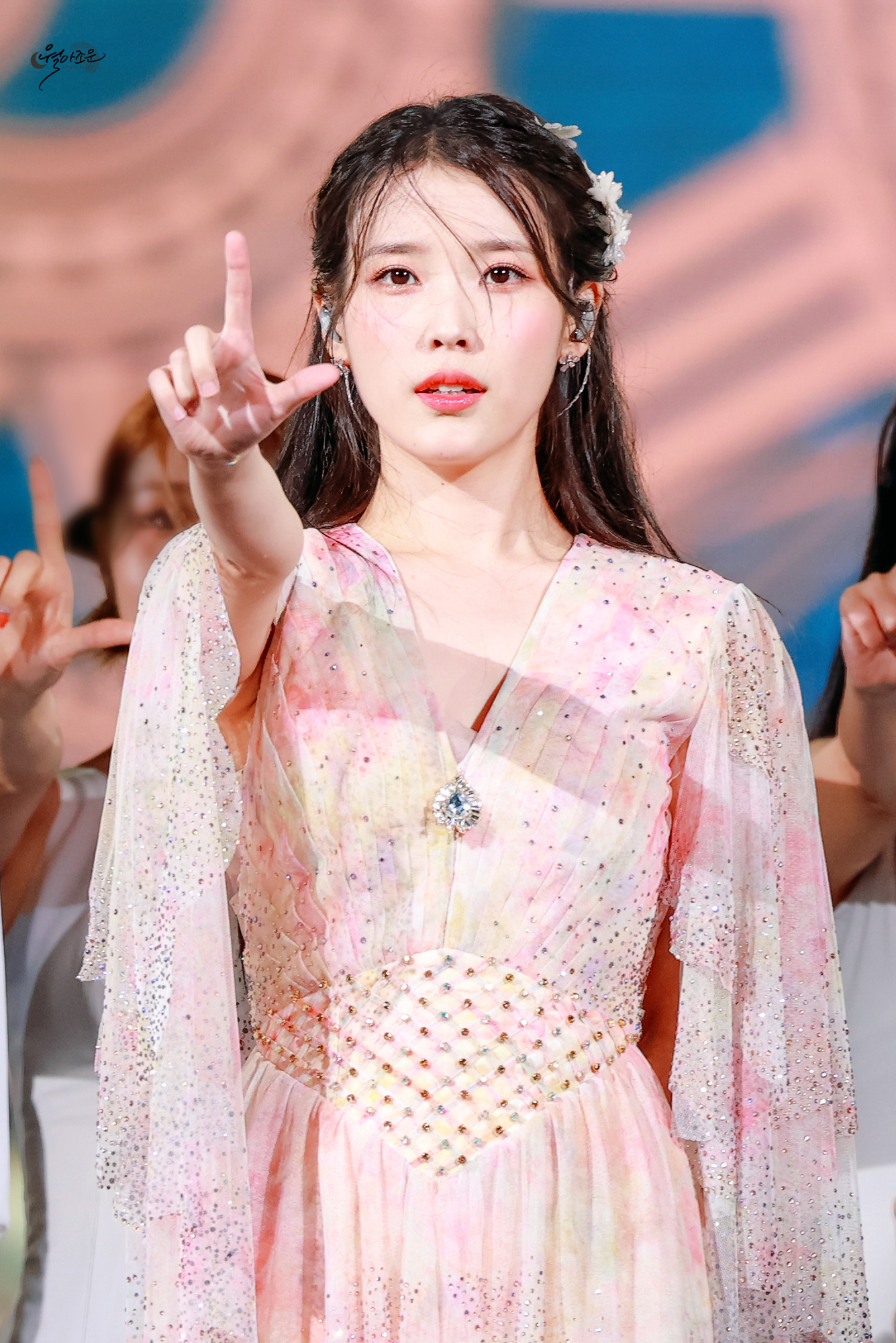
IU performing at The Golden Hour: Under the Orange Sun concert on September 17, 2022

South Korean singer-songwriter IU (Lee Ji-eun) has written over seventy songs, mostly for her own musical career, but also for other performers and for several soundtrack albums. She debuted in September 2008 with the single "Lost Child" and subsequently released the extended play (EP) Lost and Found. The EP was completely written by Choi Gap-won.

The first song credited to IU was "Alone in the Room", a song from her third extended play, Real, released in 2010. With the release of her second studio album, Last Fantasy (2011), she started to take more creative control over the music, writing six of the thirteen total tracks. The following studio album, Modern Times (2013), and its rerelease, Modern Times – Epilogue (2013), were also mostly written by IU and South Korean lyricist Kim Eana, who previously wrote multiple tracks on Last Fantasy. In her subsequent release, Chat-Shire (2015) IU asserted greater creative control on the album, writing the lyrics for all seven tracks (as well as the physical album's two bonus tracks) and composing the music for five tracks either individually or collaboratively. She was also credited as the album's executive producer. For the release of Palette (2017), IU served as the primary lyricist and executive producer on almost all tracks, except 'Love Alone' which was written and composed by Lee Byung-woo. Her fifth extended play, Love Poem, was entirely written by her, with two tracks— "The Visitor" and "Blueming", being produced by her. IU wrote lyrics to all the tracks on her fifth studio album, Lilac. Additionally, she helped compose two of the album's singles, "Coin" and "Celebrity". In 2021, she also released the album Pieces consisting of five acoustic and orchestral songs, entirely in Korean, written, composed, arranged and produced by IU over the years. The lyrics on her sixth EP The Winning were entirely self written, and she received composition credits on the track "Holssi". IU wrote and performed multiple songs for various South Korean films and television series, including The Greatest Love, Bel Ami, The Producers, My Mister, and Hotel Del Luna.

IU has received several accolades for her songwriting, including the Lyricist of the Year award at the Gaon Chart Music Awards in 2018, 2021, and 2022 and "Best Songwriter" award at the Melon Music Awards in 2017 and 2021. Nineteen of the tracks written by the singer have been released as singles, with fifteen of those reaching the top of the Gaon Digital Chart, including "Through the Night", the third best-selling single in South Korea with seven million sales.

== Songs ==
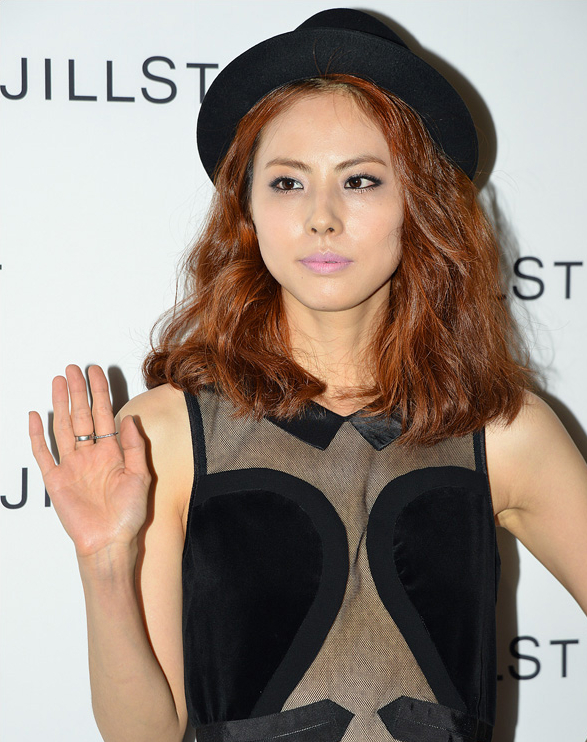
IU and eleven more are credited as writers on "Christmas Wishes", a collaboration between Park Ji-yoon (pictured), Lim Kim, Jang Jane and Puer Kim.

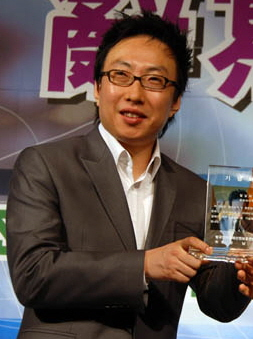
IU wrote "Leon", a song performed by her and Park Myeong-su (pictured) as EU God-G Isn't EU for MBC's Infinite Challenge.

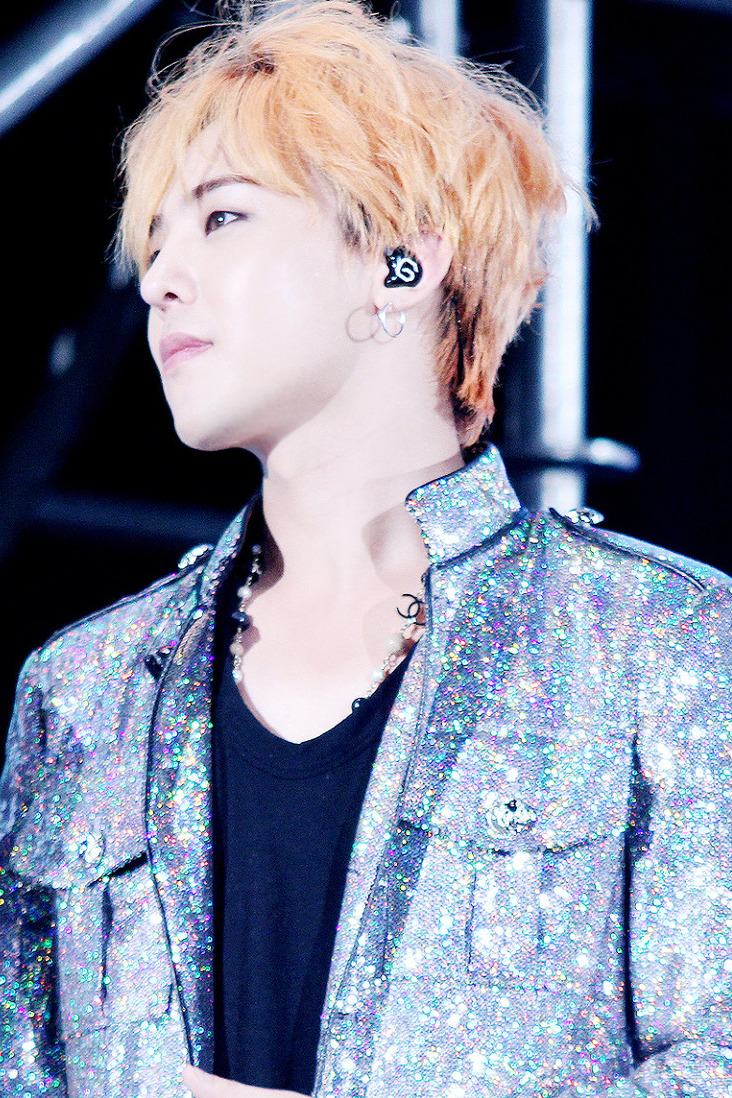
For her fourth studio album Palette (2017), IU collaborated with G-Dragon (pictured) on "Palette". He is credited as a writer and the song topped the Gaon Digital Chart.

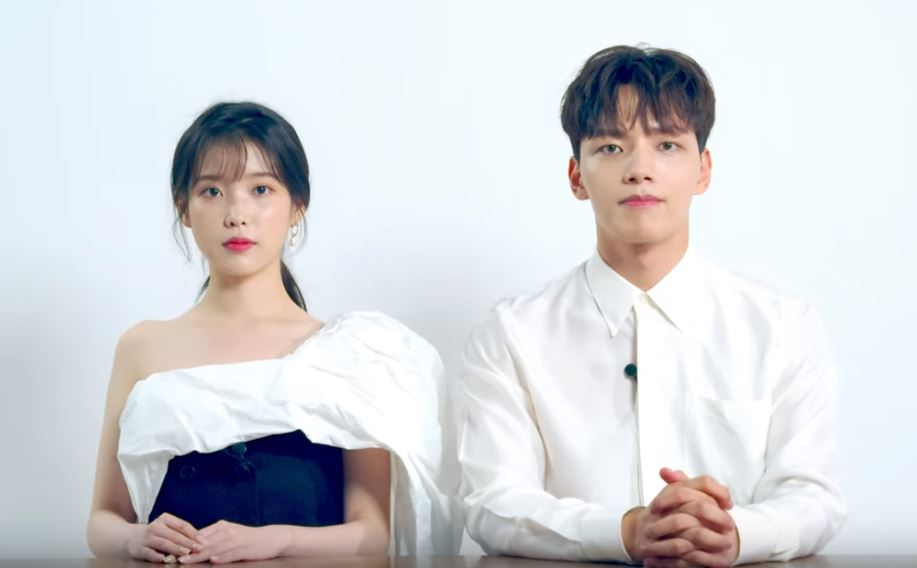
IU and actor Yeo Jin-goo (pictured) starred in the South Korean television series Hotel del Luna. For the series, IU wrote and recorded the song "Happy Ending".

Key
†	Indicates single
‡	Indicates songs written solely by IU

Song title, original artist, album of release, and year of release
Song	Artist(s)	Writer(s)	Album	Year	Ref.
"4AM"	IU	Lee Ji-eun; Corinne Bailey Rae	Last Fantasy	2011	
"Above the Time" (시간의 바깥; Siganui bakkat)	IU	Lee Ji-eun; Lee Min-soo	Love Poem	2019	
"Ah Puh" (어푸; Eopu)	IU	Lee Ji-eun; Lee Chan-hyuk; Peejay	Lilac	2021	
"In a Room Alone" (혼자 있는 방; Honja inneun bang)	IU	Lee Ji-eun; Choi Gap-won; Jeon Seung-woo	Real	2010	
"The Abandoned" (길 잃은 강아지; Gil ireun gangaji)	IU	Lee Ji-eun	Last Fantasy	2011	
"Bad Day" (싫은 날; Sireun nal)	IU	Lee Ji-eun	Modern Times	2013	
"Bbibbi" † (삐삐; Ppippi)	IU	Lee Ji-eun; Lee Jong-hoon	Non-album release	2018	
"Black Out"	IU	Lee Ji-eun; Lee Jong-hoon	Palette	2017	
"Blueming" †	IU	Lee Ji-eun; Lee Chae-kyu; Lee Jong-hoon	Love Poem	2019	
"Bye, Summer" † (바이, 썸머; Bai, sseommeo)	IU	Lee Ji-eun; Seo Dong-hwan	Non-album release	2025	
"Can't Love You Anymore" † (사랑이 잘; Sarangi jal)	IU featuring Oh Hyuk	Lee Ji-eun; Lee Jong-hoon; Oh Hyuk	Palette	2017	
"Celebrity" †	IU	Lee Ji-eun; Jeppe London Bilsby; Lauritz Emil Christiansen; Ryan S. Jhun; Chloe Anne Latimer; Celine Svanback	Lilac	2021	
"Christmas Wishes" † (크리스마스 소원; Keuriseumaseu sowon)	Park Ji-yoon, Lim Kim, Jang Jane and Puer Kim	Lee Ji-eun; Hareem; Jang Jane; Brian Joo; Jung Jichan; Lim Kim; Na Yoon-kwon; Park Ji-yoon; Puer Kim; Yoon Jong-shin; Younha	Mystic Holiday 2013	2013	
"Coin" †	IU	Lee Ji-eun; Poptime; Kako	Lilac	2021	
"Dear Moon"	Jehwi	Lee Ji-eun; Kim Je-hwi	My Mister OST	2018	
"Dear Name" (이름에게; Ireumege)	IU	Lee Ji-eun; Kim Eana; Lee Jong-hoon	Palette	2017	
"Dlwlrma" (이 지금; I jigeum)	IU	Lee Ji-eun; Kim Je-hwi	Palette	2017	
"Drama" (드라마)	IU	Lee Ji-eun	Pieces	2021	
"Eight" † (에잇)	IU featuring Suga	Lee Ji-eun; El Capitxn; Min Yoon-gi	Non-album release	2020	
"Empty Cup" (빈 컵; Bin keop)	IU	Lee Ji-eun; Penomeco; Woogie	Lilac	2021	
"Ending Scene" (이런 엔딩; Ireon ending)	IU	Lee Ji-eun; Sam Kim	Palette	2017	
"Epilogue" (에필로그)	IU	Lee Ji-eun; Im Geum-bi; Kim Soo-young; Shim Eun-ji; Sumin	Lilac	2021	
"Everything's Alright"	IU featuring Kim Hyeon-cheol	Lee Ji-eun; Kim Hyeon-cheol	Last Fantasy	2011	
"Flu"	IU	Lee Ji-eun; Madilyn Bailey; Jacob Chatelain; Martin Coogan; London Jackson; Ryan S. Jhun; Zachariah Palmer	Lilac	2021	
"Friday" ‡ † (금요일에 만나요; Geumyoire mannayo)	IU featuring Jang Yi-jeong of History	Lee Ji-eun	Modern Times – Epilogue	2013	
"Full Stop" (마침표; Machimpyo)	IU	Lee Ji-eun; Son Sung-je	Palette	2017	
"Glasses" (안경; Angyeong)	IU	Lee Ji-eun	Chat-Shire	2015	
"Greedyy"†	JeA featuring Moonbyul of Mamamoo	Lee Ji-eun; Moon Byul-yi	Non-album single	2020	
"Happy Ending"	IU	Lee Ji-eun; Kim Je-hwi	Non-album single	2019	
"Heart" † (마음; Maeum)	IU	Lee Ji-eun; Kim Je-hwi	Chat-Shire (CD only) and The Producers OST	2015	
"Her" † (그의 그대; Geuui geudae)	Cherry B	Lee Ji-eun; Cherry B Lee Jong-hoon	Non-album single	2017	
"Hi Spring Bye" (봄 안녕 봄; Bom annyeong bom)	IU	Lee Ji-eun; Naul	Lilac	2021	
"Hold My Hand" (내 손을 잡아; Nae soneul jaba)	IU	Lee Ji-eun	The Greatest Love OST	2011	
"Holssi" † (홀씨; Holssi)	IU	Lee Ji-eun; Lee Jong-hoon; Lee Chae-gyu	The Winning	2024	
"I Believe in Love" † (사랑을 믿어요; Sarangeul mideoyo)	Yoo Seung Ho featuring IU	Lee Ji-eun; Yoo Seung Ho; G. Gorilla	Road for Hope	2010	
"I Stan U" (관객이 될게; Gwangaegi doelge)	IU	Lee Ji-eun; Kim Je-hwi; Kim Hee-won	The Winning	2024	
"Jam Jam" (잼잼; Jaemjaem)	IU	Lee Ji-eun; Sunwoo Jung-a	Palette	2017	
"Knees" (무릎; Mureup)	IU	Lee Ji-eun	Chat-Shire	2015	
"Leon" † (레옹)	EU God-G Isn't EU con. Park Myeong-su & IU	Lee Ji-eun; Lee Jong-hoon	Infinite Challenge; Yeongdong Expressway Music Festival	2015	
"Lilac" † (라일락)	IU	Lee Ji-eun; Im Soo-ho; Dr.Jo; Ung Kim; N!ko	Lilac	2021	
"Love Letter" (러브레터)	IU	Lee Ji-eun	Pieces	2021	
"Love of B" (을의 연애; Eurui yeonae)	IU featuring Park Ju-won	Lee Ji-eun; Park Ju-won	Modern Times	2013	
"Love Poem" †	IU	Lee Ji-eun; Lee Jong-hoon	Love Poem	2019	
"Love Wins All" †	IU	Lee Ji-eun; Seo Dong-hwan	The Winning	2024	
"Lullaby" (자장가; Jajangga)	IU	Lee Ji-eun; Kim Hee-won	Love Poem	2019	
"My Christmas Wish" † (십이월 이십오일의 고백; Sibiwol isiboirui gobaek)	Jung Seung-hwan	Lee Ji-eun; Kim Je-hwi	Non-album single	2019	
"My Sea" (아이와 나의 바다; Aiwa naui bada)	IU	Lee Ji-eun; Kim Hee-won; Kim Je-hwi	Lilac	2021	
"Next Stop" (정거장; Jeonggeojang)	IU	Lee Ji-eun	Pieces	2021	
"Not Spring, Love, or Cherry Blossoms" † (봄 사랑 벚꽃 말고; Bom sarang beotkkot malgo)	High4 featuring IU	Lee Ji-eun; Oh Seung-taek; Lee Jong-hoon; Lee Chae-gyu	Hi High	2014	
"Palette" † (팔레트)	IU featuring G-Dragon	Lee Ji-eun; Kwon Ji-yong	Palette	2017	
"Pastel Crayon" (크레파스)	IU	Lee Ji-eun; KZ; Junjaman	Modern Times – Epilogue and Bel Ami OST	2013	
"Peach" ‡ † (복숭아; Boksunga)	IU	Lee Ji-eun	Spring of a Twenty Year Old	2012	
"Red Queen"	IU featuring Zion.T	Lee Ji-eun; Lee Chae-kyu; Lee Jong-hoon	Chat-Shire	2015	
"Remembrance Candy" (기억사탕; Gieoksatang)	Billlie	Lee Ji-eun (credited as IU)	Appendix: Of All We Have Lost	2024	
"Shh.."	IU featuring Hyein, Jo Won Sun & (Narr. Patti Kim)	Lee Ji-eun; Lee Jong-hoon; Lee Chae-gyu	The Winning	2024	
"Shoes" (새 신발; Sae sinbal)	IU	Lee Ji-eun; Lee Jong-hoon	Chat-Shire	2015	
"Shopper" †	IU	Lee Ji-eun; Lee Jong-hoon; Lee Chae-gyu	The Winning	2024	
"Strawberry Moon" †	IU	Lee Ji-eun; Lee Jong-hoon	Non-single album	2021	
"Take Care Of My Dad" (아빠를 부탁해; Appareul butakhae)	IU	Lee Ji-eun	Take Care of My Dad OST	2015	
"Teacher"	IU featuring Ra.D	Lee Ji-eun; Lee Doo-hyun	Last Fantasy	2011	
"Troll" (돌림노래; Dollimnorae)	IU featuring Dean	Lee Ji-eun; Kwon Hyuk; Park Woo-sang; Junny	Lilac	2021	
"The Shower" (푸르던; Pureudeon)	IU	Lee Ji-eun	Chat-Shire	2015	
"The Snowman" † (눈사람; Nunsaram)	Jung Seung-hwan	Lee Ji-eun; Kim Je-hwi	Spring Again	2018	
"The Visitor" (그 사람; Geu saram)	IU	Lee Ji-eun	Love Poem	2019	
"Through the Night" † (밤편지; Bampyeonji)	IU	Lee Ji-eun; Kim Hee-won; Kim Je-hwi	Palette	2017	
"Twenty-Three" (스물셋; Seumulset)	IU	Lee Ji-eun; Lee Chae-kyu; Lee Jong-hoon	Chat-Shire	2015	
"Twenty-Three" (Bonus track)	IU	Lee Ji-eun; Lee Jong-hoon; PJ	Chat-Shire and The Producers OST	2015	
"Uncle" (삼촌; Samchon)	IU featuring Lee Juck	Lee Ji-eun; Lee Juck	Last Fantasy	2011	
"Unlucky"	IU	Lee Ji-eun; Kim Je-hwi	Love Poem	2019	
"Voice-mail" (Japanese version)	IU	Lee Ji-eun; Yadako	Can You Hear Me?	2011	
"Voice-mail" (Korean version)	IU	Lee Ji-eun	Modern Times	2013	
"Wait" (기다려; Gidaryeo)	IU	Lee Ji-eun; Texu	Modern Times	2013	
"When You Fall" †	Sam Kim featuring Chai	Lee Ji-eun; Chai; Sam Kim	Non-album single	2018	
"Winter Sleep" ‡ † (겨울잠; Gyeouljam)	IU	Lee Ji-eun	Pieces	2021	
"Wisdom Tooth" (사랑니; Sarangni)	IU	Lee Ji-eun; G. Gorilla	Last Fantasy	2011	
"You" (너; Neo)	IU	Lee Ji-eun	Pieces	2021	
"Zezé"	IU	Lee Ji-eun; Lee Chae-kyu; Lee Jong-hoon	Chat-Shire	2015	
