= IU discography =

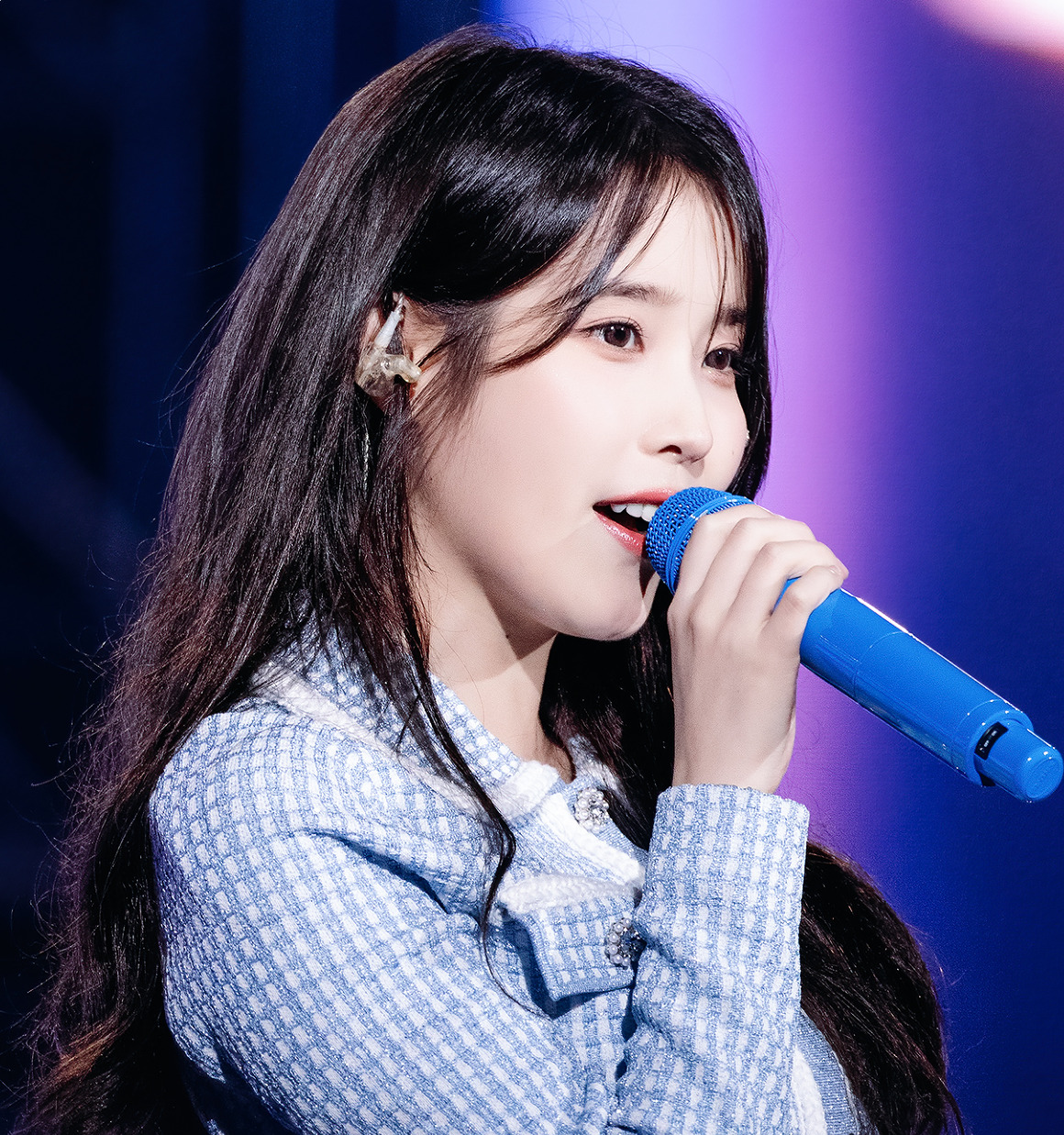
- IU in September 2023
- Studio albums: 6
- Extended plays: 12
- Compilation albums: 2
- Singles: 63
- Single albums: 5

South Korean singer-songwriter IU has released six studio albums, twelve extended plays (EPs), sixty-three singles (including twenty-five as featured artist), five single albums, three remake albums and two compilation albums. In addition, the singer has collaborations and soundtracks for television series, films, and online games.

The singer debuted with "Lost Child" in September 2008, which was released as the lead single for her debut EP Lost and Found (2008). The single and the EP failed to enter the charts until 2012 and were considered a failure by the singer herself. The singers first studio album Growing Up was released in April 2009 and supported through three singles—"Boo", "You Know" and "Marshmallow". Between late-2008 and January 2010, there were no official South Korean charts. With the foundation of the Gaon Music Chart in February 2010, the album debuted on no. 85 on its first issued week and later peaked at no. 6 in January 2012. In 2010, the singer released two singles; "Nagging" alongside Lim Seul-ong and "Good Day", which both peaked atop the Gaon Digital Chart and became two of the best-selling singles in South Korea, accumulating more than 4 million total sales.

Her second studio album Last Fantasy was released in November 2011 and was supported through the single "You & I". The album and the single debuted atop the South Korean charts with the album selling around 125,000 units and the single more than 6 million paid digital downloads, making it the second best-selling song in South Korea. IU's debut Japanese extended play I□U was released in December, debuting at no. 15 of the Oricon Albums Chart, selling about 12,000 copies. IU's fourth studio album Palette was released in April 2017 and supported through three singles; "Through the Night", "Can't Love You Anymore" and "Palette". The album debuted atop the Gaon Album Chart, selling a total of 97,000 copies. It became her first album to top the Billboard World Albums and peaked at no. 25 of the Top Heatseekers. Her ninth extended play Love Poem was released in November 2019. It debuted atop the Gaon Album Chart and became her best-selling album within two weeks, moving more than 160,000 physical copies. Love Poem was supported by two singles: "Love Poem" and "Blueming", both combined topping the charts for five weeks.

Over the course of her career, IU has sold over one million albums and more than 120 million paid digital downloads (with the sales of collaborative singles, soundtracks, album tracks, and other appearances included), making her the best selling female and solo artist of South Korea. IU has scored the most number one songs in Korea with a record-breaking 31 number-one songs on the Gaon Digital Chart and 18 on the Billboard K-pop Hot 100.

== Albums ==
=== Studio albums ===
List of studio albums, with selected details, chart positions, and sales
Title	Album details	Peak chart positions				Sales	Certifications (Note: In April 2018, the Korea Music Content Association introduced music recording certifications for albums and singles; pre-2018 releases therefore are ineligible for certifications.)
Title	Album details	KOR (Note: Prior to the establishment of the Gaon Music Chart in 2010, South Korea's music charts were supplied by the Music Industry Association of Korea (MIAK), which stopped compiling data in 2008.)	JPN	US World	US Heat	Sales	Certifications
Growing Up	Released: April 23, 2009; Label: LOEN; Formats: CD, digital download, streaming	6	—	—	—	KOR: 26,171	—N/a
Last Fantasy	Released: November 29, 2011; Label: LOEN; Formats: CD, digital download, streaming	1	—	—	—	KOR: 139,869	—N/a
Modern Times	Released: October 8, 2013; Label: LOEN Tree; Formats: CD, digital download, streaming	1	69	4	—	KOR: 73,351; JPN: 3,323	—N/a
Modern Times – Epilogue	Released: December 20, 2013; Label: LOEN Tree; Formats: CD, DVD, digital download, streaming	4	69	4	—	KOR: 10,000	—N/a
Palette	Released: April 21, 2017; Label: Fave; Formats: CD, digital download, streaming	1	96	1	25	KOR: 145,911; JPN: 1,303; US: 1,000	—N/a
Lilac	Released: March 25, 2021; Label: EDAM; Formats: CD, digital download, streaming	1	23	9	18	KOR: 431,571; JPN: 2,344	KMCA: Platinum
"—" denotes releases that did not chart or were not released in that region.

=== Compilation albums ===
List of compilation albums, with selected details
Title	Album details
Smash Hits	Released: January 8, 2016; Label: Warner Music Taiwan; Formats: CD, DVD
Smash Hits 2 – The Stories Between U & I	Released: September 18, 2018; Label: Warner Music Taiwan; Formats: CD, DVD

== Extended plays ==
List of extended plays, with selected chart positions and sales
Title	Details	Peak chart positions				Sales	Certifications
Title	Details	KOR	JPN	US Heat	US World	Sales	Certifications
Korean
Lost and Found	Released: September 23, 2008; Label: LOEN; Formats: CD, digital download	22	—	—	—	KOR: 10,796	—N/a
IU...IM	Released: November 12, 2009; Label: LOEN; Formats: CD, digital download	7	—	—	—	KOR: 18,385	—N/a
Real	Released: December 9, 2010; Label: LOEN; Formats: CD, digital download	2	—	—	—	KOR: 92,743	—N/a
A Flower Bookmark	Released: May 16, 2014; Label: LOEN Tree; Formats: CD, digital download, LP	2	144	—	14	KOR: 91,935; JPN: 896	—N/a
Chat-Shire	Released: October 23, 2015; Label: LOEN Tree; Formats: CD, digital download	2	—	19	4	KOR: 96,587; JPN: 944	—N/a
A Flower Bookmark 2	Released: September 22, 2017; Label: Fave; Formats: CD, digital download	3	—	—	5	KOR: 79,532; JPN: 479	—N/a
Love Poem	Released: November 18, 2019; Label: Kakao M; Formats: CD, digital download	1	—	9	10	KOR: 276,561	KMCA: Platinum
Pieces	Released: December 29, 2021; Label: EDAM; Formats: Digital download	—	—	—	—	—N/a	—N/a
The Winning	Released: February 20, 2024; Label: EDAM; Formats: CD, digital download	3	28	—	—	KOR: 378,428; JPN: 2,446	KMCA: Platinum
A Flower Bookmark 3	Released: May 27, 2025; Label: EDAM; Formats: CD, digital download, streaming	8	50	—	—	KOR: 198,456; JPN: 526	
Japanese
I□U	Released: December 14, 2011; Label: EMI Music Japan; Formats: CD, DVD	—	15	—	—	JPN: 12,000	—N/a
Can You Hear Me?	Released: March 15, 2013; Label: EMI Music Japan; Format: CD, DVD	—	23	—	—	JPN: 8,500	—N/a

== Single albums ==
List of single albums, with selected details and chart positions
Title	Album details	Peak		Sales
Title	Album details	KOR	JPN	Sales
Korean
Real+	Released: February 18, 2011; Label: LOEN; Formats: CD, digital download	2	—	KOR: 28,262
Spring of a Twenty Year Old	Released: May 11, 2012; Label: LOEN; Formats: CD, digital download	3	—	KOR: 50,249
Japanese
Good Day	Released: March 21, 2012; Label: EMI Music Japan; Formats: CD, DVD	—	6	JPN: 30,634
You & I	Released: July 18, 2012; Label: EMI Music Japan; Formats: CD, DVD	—	5	JPN: 18,068
Monday Afternoon	Released: September 11, 2013; Label: EMI Records Japan; Formats: CD, DVD	—	15	JPN: 7,044

== Singles ==
=== As lead artist ===
==== 2000s ====
List of 2000s singles, with selected chart positions, year, and album
Title	Year	Peak chart positions	Sales (Note: Korean sales are paid digital downloads, previously weekly, monthly and annually provided by the Gaon Music Chart. In 2018, Gaon replaced detailed downloads and streaming numbers with the Gaon Digital Index. Sales are now monthly reported on the 'Observation Board' if a song reaches a specific milestone. Japanese sales are physical single sales, provided by Oricon.)	Album
Title	Year	KOR (Note: The Gaon Music Chart began releasing data in 2010 after the Music Industry Association of Korea stopped compiling data in 2008. Online sources for charts prior to January 2010 are currently unavailable.)	Sales	Album
"Lost Child" (미아)	2008	— (Note: "Lost Child" did not enter the Gaon Digital Chart, but peaked at number 153 on the Gaon Download Chart.)	KOR: 50,000 (Note: South Korean sales figures for "Lost Child" as of March 2012.)	Lost and Found
"Boo"	2009	—	—N/a	Growing Up
"You Know" (있잖아; Rock version) (Note: alternatively titled "Well... (Rock Ver.)" and "Hey (Rock Ver.)")	2009	—	—N/a	Growing Up
"Marshmallow" (마쉬멜로우) (featuring Zico) (Note: The song was recorded two years before Zico debuted as the leader of Block B.)	2009	39	—N/a	IU...IM

==== 2010s ====
List of 2010s singles, with selected chart positions, year, and album
Title	Year	Peak chart positions							Sales	Certifications	Album
Title	Year	KOR	KOR Billb. (Note: The Billboard K-pop Hot 100 chart launched in 2011 and was discontinued in 2014. On the issue dated May 29 – June 4, 2017, the chart was re-established.)	JPN	JPN Hot	NZ Hot	SGP	US World	Sales	Certifications	Album
"Nagging" (잔소리) (with Lim Seul-ong)	2010	1	—	—	—	—	—	—	KOR: 3,043,000 (Note: South Korean sales figures for "Nagging" as of February 2012.); KOR: 490,000 (rt.)	—N/a	Non-album single
"Good Day" (Note: "Good Day" was released in Korea on December 9, 2010. The Japanese version was released in Japan on March 21, 2012.) (좋은 날)	2010	1	87	6	5	—	—	—	KOR: 4,451,000 (Note: South Korean sales figures for "Good Day" as of 2014.); JPN: 30,634	—N/a	Real
"The Story Only I Didn't Know" (나만 몰랐던 이야기)	2011	1	—	—	—	—	—	—	KOR: 2,933,000 (Note: South Korean sales figures for "Only I Didn't Know" as of December 2013.)	—N/a	Real+
"Ice Flower" (얼음꽃) (featuring Yuna Kim)	2011	8	—	—	—	—	—	—	KOR: 1,733,000 (Note: Sales figures for "Ice Flower", "Hold My Hand", "Someday" and "Cruel Fairytale" as of 2011.)	—N/a	Non-album single
"You & I" (Note: "You & I" was released in South Korea as a single on November 28, 2011. In Japan, the single was released on July 18, 2012.) (너랑 나)	2011	1	1	5	11	—	—	3	KOR: 7,000,000 (Note: South Korean sales figures for 'YOU&I' as of July 2022.); JPN: 18,000	—N/a	Last Fantasy
"Peach" (복숭아)	2012	2	3	—	—	—	—	24	KOR: 1,384,000 (Note: Sales figures for "Peach", "Every End of the Day", "Like You" and "Sea of Moonlight" as of December 2012.)	—N/a	Spring of a Twenty Year Old
"Every End of the Day" (하루 끝)	2012	1	1	—	—	—	—	—	KOR: 2,528,000	—N/a	Spring of a Twenty Year Old
"Beautiful Dancer"	2013	—	—	—	66	—	—	—	—N/a	—N/a	Can You Hear Me?
"Monday Afternoon"	2013	—	—	15	27	—	—	—	JPN: 7,000	—N/a	Non-album single
"The Red Shoes" (분홍신)	2013	1	1	—	—	—	—	19	KOR: 1,359,000 (Note: Sales figures for "The Red Shoes" as of 2014.)	—N/a	Modern Times
"Friday" (금요일에 만나요) (featuring Jang Yi-jeong)	2013	1	1	—	—	—	—	—	KOR: 5,000,000	—N/a	Modern Times – Epilogue
"My Old Story" (나의 옛날 이야기) (Note: Jo Duk-bae cover)	2014	2	1	—	—	—	—	—	KOR: 2,500,000	—N/a	A Flower Bookmark
"Twenty-Three" (스물셋)	2015	1	—	—	—	—	—	4	KOR: 2,500,000 (Note: Sales figures for "Twenty-Three", "Heart" and "Can't Love You Anymore" as of February 2019.)	—N/a	Chat-Shire
"Through the Night" (밤편지)	2017	1	18	—	—	—	—	16	KOR: 7,000,000 (Note: Sales figures for "Through the Night" as of July 2022.)	—N/a	Palette
"Can't Love You Anymore" (사랑이 잘) (with Oh Hyuk)	2017	1	88	—	—	—	—	—	KOR: 2,500,000	—N/a	Palette
"Palette" (팔레트) (featuring G-Dragon)	2017	1	50	—	—	—	—	4	KOR: 2,500,000 (Note: Sales figures for "Palette" as of September 2018.); US: 2,000	—N/a	Palette
"Autumn Morning" (가을 아침) (Note: Yang Hee-eun cover)	2017	1	53	—	—	—	—	—	KOR: 2,500,000	—N/a	A Flower Bookmark 2
"Sleepless Rainy Night" (잠 못 드는 밤 비는 내리고) (Note: Kim Gun-mo cover)	2017	4	—	—	—	—	—	—	KOR: 734,000 (Note: Sales figures for "Sleepless Rainy Night" as of December 2017.)	—N/a	A Flower Bookmark 2
"Bbibbi" (삐삐)	2018	1	1	—	—	26	26	5	KOR: 2,500,000 (Note: Sales figures for "Bbibbi" as of September 2019.)	KMCA: Platinum (str.); KMCA: Platinum (dig.)	Non-album single
"Love Poem"	2019	1	1	—	—	—	—	9	—N/a	KMCA: 2× Platinum (str.)	Love Poem
"Blueming"	2019	1	1	—	—	—	14	10	KOR: 2,500,000 (Note: Sales figures for "Blueming" as of August 2022.)	KMCA: 3× Platinum (str.); KMCA: Platinum (dig.); RIAJ: Gold (str.)	Love Poem
"—" denotes releases that did not chart or were not released in that region.

==== 2020s ====
List of 2020s singles, with selected chart positions, year, and album
Title	Year	Peak chart positions										Sales	Certifications	Album
Title	Year	KOR	KOR Billb.	JPN Comb	JPN Hot	MLY	NZ Hot	SGP	TWN	US World	WW	Sales	Certifications	Album
"Eight" (에잇) (featuring Suga)	2020	1	1	25	25	1	14	1	—	1	—	US: 7,000	KMCA: 2× Platinum (str.); RIAJ: Gold (str.)	Non-album single
"Celebrity"	2021	1	1	—	—	3	13	2	—	3	78	—N/a	KMCA: 2× Platinum (str.); RIAJ: Gold (str.)	Lilac
"Lilac" (라일락)	2021	1	1	—	—	13	—	6	—	11	— (Note: "Lilac" did not enter the Billboard Global 200, but peaked at number 151 on the Billboard Global Excl. U.S. chart.)	—N/a	KMCA: Platinum (str.)	Lilac
"Coin"	2021	4	4	—	—	—	—	26	—	18	—	—N/a	—N/a	Lilac
"Strawberry Moon"	2021	1	1	—	—	—	—	22	—	10	— (Note: "Strawberry Moon" did not enter the Billboard Global 200, but peaked at no. 121 on the Billboard Global Excl. U.S. chart.)	—N/a	KMCA: Platinum (str.)	Non-album single
"Winter Sleep" (겨울잠)	2021	1	1	—	—	—	—	—	—	—	—	—N/a	—N/a	Pieces
"Love Wins All"	2024	1	1	— (Note: "Love Wins All" did not enter the Oricon Combined Singles Chart, but peaked at number 29 on the Digital Singles Chart.)	80	—	29	11	6	3	25	—N/a	KMCA: Platinum (str.)	The Winning
"Holssi" (홀씨)	2024	7	6	—	—	—	—	—	—	—	— (Note: "Holssi" did not enter the Billboard Global 200, but peaked at number 138 on the Billboard Global Excl. U.S. chart.)	—N/a	—N/a	The Winning
"Shopper"	2024	6	9	—	—	—	—	— (Note: "Shopper" did not enter the RIAS International Top Charts, but peaked at number 30 on the Regional Top Charts.)	22	—	— (Note: "Shopper" did not enter the Billboard Global 200, but peaked at number 179 on the Billboard Global Excl. U.S. chart.)	—N/a	—N/a	The Winning
"Never Ending Story"	2025	3	—	—	—	—	—	—	—	—	—	—N/a	—N/a	A Flower Bookmark 3
"Bye, Summer" (바이, 썸머)	2025	8	—	—	—	—	—	—	—	—	—	—N/a	—N/a	Non-album singles
"Unknown Planet" (이 별로부터)	2026	12	—	—	—	—	—	—	—	—	—	—N/a	—N/a	Non-album singles
"Dear My Crazy Soulmate"	2026	10	—	—	—	—	26	— (Note: "Dear My Crazy Soulmate" did not enter the Official Singapore Chart, but peaked at number 16 on the Regional Chart.)	11	—	— (Note: "Dear My Crazy Soulmate" did not enter the Billboard Global 200, but peaked at number 187 on the Billboard Global Excl. U.S. chart.)	—N/a	—N/a	Non-album singles
"—" denotes releases that did not chart or were not released in that region.

=== As featured artist ===
Title	Year	Peak chart positions			Sales	Certifications	Album
Title	Year	KOR Circle	KOR Hot	US World	Sales	Certifications	Album
"Suga Love" (Bizniz featuring IU)	2009	—	—	—	—N/a	—N/a	Suga Love
"Monday thru Sunday" (월화수목 금토일) (Suho featuring IU)	2009	—	—	—	—N/a	—N/a	DayZ
"It's First Love" (첫사랑이죠) (Na Yoon-Kwon featuring IU)	2010	3	—	—	KOR: 1,290,307 (Note: Sales figures for "It's First Love" and "I Believe in Love" as of December 2010.)	—N/a	Non-album single
"I Believe in Love" (사랑을 믿어요) (Yoo Seung-ho featuring IU)	2010	11	—	—	KOR: 1,010,437	—N/a	Road for Hope
"It's You" (그대네요) (Sung Si-kyung featuring IU)	2010	1	—	—	KOR: 1,975,728 (Note: Sales figures for "It's You" as of December 2015.)	—N/a	The First
"I Know" (Seungri featuring IU)	2011	42	—	—	—N/a	—N/a	V.V.I.P
"Like You" (Wanted featuring IU)	2012	9	14	—	KOR: 945,260	—N/a	Vintage
"Sea of Moonlight" (달빛바다) (Fiestar featuring IU)	2012	12	10	—	KOR: 1,004,426	—N/a	Loen Tree Summer Story
"Not Spring, Love, or Cherry Blossoms" (봄 사랑 벚꽃 말고) (High4 featuring IU)	2014	1	1	21	KOR: 2,763,793 (Note: Sales figures for "Not Spring, Love, or Cherry Blossoms" as of April 2017.)	—N/a	Hi High
"Summer Love" (애타는 마음) (Ulala Session featuring IU)	2014	4	—	—	KOR: 1,085,944 (Note: Sales figures for "Summer Love" as of December 2015.)	—N/a	Non-album single
"Sogyeokdong" (Seo Taiji featuring IU)	2014	4	—	21	KOR: 706,157 (Note: Sales figures for "When Love Passes By" and "Sogyeokdong" as of December 2014.)	—N/a	Quiet Night
"When Would It Be" (언제쯤이면) (Yoon Hyun-sang featuring IU)	2014	9	—	—	KOR: 815,000 (Note: Sales figures for "When Would It Be" as of March 14, 2015.)	—N/a	Pianoforte
"Leon" (레옹) (Park Myung-soo with IU as Eu God-G isn't EU)	2015	1	—	18	KOR: 1,661,825 (Note: Sales figures for "Leon" as of September 2016.)	—N/a	Infinite Challenge: Yeongdong Expressway Music Festival
"Choice" (결정) (Hyungdon and Daejun featuring IU)	2016	22	—	—	KOR: 130,098 (Note: Sales figures for "Choice" as of September 2016.)	—N/a	Non-album single
"Secret Everyone Knows" (누구나 아는 비밀) (Sister's Barbershop featuring IU)	2017	—	—	—	—N/a	—N/a	People Who Stay Alone
"Love Story" (연애소설) (Epik High featuring IU)	2017	1	1	—	KOR: 2,500,000	—N/a	We've Done Something Wonderful
"Cat"(고양이) (Sunwoo Jung-a featuring IU)	2017	64	—	—	—N/a	—N/a	Non-album single
"SoulMate" (Zico featuring IU)	2018	1	1	—	—N/a	—N/a	SoulMate
"Fairytale" (동화) (Kim Dong-ryul featuring IU)	2018	4	—	—	—N/a	—N/a	Non-album singles
"First Winter" (Sung Si-kyung featuring IU)	2019	3	11	—	—N/a	—N/a	Non-album singles
"Small Room" (Sweet Sorrow featuring IU)	2020	—	—	—	—N/a	—N/a	Non-album singles
"Nakka" (낙하) (AKMU featuring IU)	2021	1	1	—	—N/a	KMCA: Platinum (str.)	Next Episode
"Mother Nature (H₂O)" (Kang Seung-won featuring IU)	2022	130	81	—	—N/a	—	Moving House Part.3
"Ganadara" (Jay Park featuring IU)	2022	1	1	10	—N/a	—	Non-album single
"People Pt. 2" (Agust D featuring IU)	2023	14	25	1	—N/a	—	D-Day
"Seesaw" (Crush featuring IU)	2026	21	—	—	—N/a	—	Non-album single
"—" denotes releases that did not chart or were not released in that region.

=== Soundtrack appearances ===
Title	Year	Peak			Sales	Certifications	Album
Title	Year	KOR Circle	KOR Hot	US World	Sales	Certifications	Album
"You Are Always Like That" (그러는 그대는)	2009	—	—	—	—N/a	—N/a	Strike Love O.S.T
"To the Sea" (아라로)	2009	—	—	—	—N/a	—N/a	Queen Seondeok O.S.T
"Wind Flower" (바람꽃)	2009	—	—	—	—N/a	—N/a	Queen Seondeok O.S.T
"Danny Boy"	2009	—	—	—	—N/a	—N/a	Paradise O.S.T
"Fifth Finger" (다섯째 손가락)	2010	11	—	—	—N/a	—N/a	19-Nineteen O.S.T
"Because I'm a Woman" (여자라서)	2010	6	—	—	KOR: 1,478,000 (Note: Sales figures for "Because I'm a Woman" as of December 2010.)	—N/a	Road No. 1 O.S.T
"Someday"	2011	1	—	—	KOR: 2,209,924	—N/a	Dream High O.S.T
"Hold My Hand" (내 손을 잡아)	2011	2	9	—	KOR: 2,500,000	—N/a	The Greatest Love O.S.T
"Heart" (Note: The song was later included as a CD-only special track in a special edition of the soundtrack album for the series. It was also included as a CD-only bonus track in IU's EP Chat-Shire.) (마음)	2015	1	—	—	KOR: 2,500,000	—N/a	The Producers O.S.T
"Give You My Heart"	2020	1	3	11	—N/a	KMCA: Platinum (str.)	Crash Landing on You O.S.T
"Into the I-Land"	2020	3	3	24	—N/a	—N/a	I-Land Part.1 Signal Song
"Someday" (Dream High musical cast featuring IU)	2024	—	—	—	—N/a	—N/a	Show Musical Dream High OST
"Midnight Walk" (밤 산책)	2025	113	—	—	—N/a	—N/a	When Life Gives You Tangerines OST
"—" denotes releases that did not chart or were not released in that region.

=== Promotional singles ===
Title	Year	Peak	Album
Title	Year	JPN Hot	Album
"Friend" (Anzen Chitai cover)	2012	—	Non-album singles
"Aishiteru" (Kourin cover)	2012	—	Non-album singles
"The Age of the Cathedrals"	2013	—	Can You Hear Me?
"New World"	2013	76	Can You Hear Me?

== Other charted songs ==
Title	Year	Peak chart positions		Sales	Certifications	Album
Title	Year	KOR Circle	KOR Hot	Sales	Certifications	Album
"Rain Drop" (Wheesung cover)	2010	74	—	KOR: 206,934 (Note: Sales figures for "Rain Drop" as of 2015.)	—N/a	I□U
"Merry Christmas Ahead" (featuring Thunder)	2010	7	17	KOR: 1,040,741 (Note: Sales figures for "Merry Christmas in Advance" since 2011 only.)	—N/a	Real
"This Is Not What I Thought" (이게 아닌데)	2010	9	—	KOR: 652,700	—N/a	Real
"The Night of the First Breakup" (첫 이별 그날 밤)	2010	20	—	—N/a	—N/a	Real
"The Thing I Do Slowly" (느리게 하는 일)	2010	21	—	—N/a	—N/a	Real
"Alone in the Room" (혼자 있는 방)	2010	27	—	—N/a	—N/a	Real
"Good Day" (Instrumental)	2010	193	—	—N/a	—N/a	Real
"Cruel Fairytale" (잔혹동화)	2011	8	—	KOR: 1,051,000	—N/a	Real+
"Secret" (비밀)	2011	2	5	KOR: 2,046,000 (Note: Sales figures for "Secret" and "Uncle" as 2012.)	—N/a	Last Fantasy
"Sleeping Prince of the Woods" (잠자는 숲 속의 왕자) (featuring Yoon Sang; Halo cover)	2011	3	9	KOR: 1,245,000 (Note: Sales figures for "Sleeping Prince of the Woods" as of January 2012.)	—N/a	Last Fantasy
"Uncle" (삼촌) (featuring Lee Juck)	2011	4	8	KOR: 1,755,709	—N/a	Last Fantasy
"A Child Searching for Stars" (별을 찾는 아이) (featuring Kim Kwang-jin)	2011	6	12	KOR: 1,078,444 (Note: Sales figures for "A Child Searching for Stars" as of January 2012.)	—N/a	Last Fantasy
"Wallpaper Patterns" (벽지무늬)	2011	7	15	KOR: 953,344 (Note: Sales figures for "Wallpaper Patterns", "Wisdom Tooth", "Teacher" and "Everything's Alright" as of January 2012.)	—N/a	Last Fantasy
"Wisdom Tooth" (사랑니)	2011	8	19	KOR: 952,827	—N/a	Last Fantasy
"Teacher" (featuring Ra.D)	2011	9	25	KOR: 844,936	—N/a	Last Fantasy
"Everything's Alright" (featuring Kim Hyeon-cheol)	2011	11	24	KOR: 847,469	—N/a	Last Fantasy
"Last Fantasy"	2011	12	27	KOR: 805,567 (Note: Sales figures for "Last Fantasy" as of January 2012.)	—N/a	Last Fantasy
"4AM"	2011	13	32	KOR: 776,856 (Note: Sales figures for "4AM", "A Stray Puppy" and "L'amant" as of January 2012.)	—N/a	Last Fantasy
"A Stray Puppy" (길 잃은 강아지)	2011	17	40	KOR: 665,559	—N/a	Last Fantasy
"L'amant" (라망)	2011	19	49	KOR: 576,293	—N/a	Last Fantasy
"I Really Don't Like Her" (그 애 참 싫다)	2012	15	12	KOR: 699,322 (Note: Sales figures for "I Really Don't Like Her" as of 2012.)	—N/a	Spring of a Twenty Year Old
"Everybody Has Secrets" (누구나 비밀은 있다) (featuring Gain of Brown Eyed Girls)	2013	2	3	KOR: 573,315 (Note: Sales figures for "Everybody Has Secrets" as of 2013.)	—N/a	Modern Times
"Love of B" (을의 연애)	2013	3	7	KOR: 428,808 (Note: Sales figures and references for "Love of B", "Between the Lips (50cm)", "A Gloomy Clock", "Modern Times" & "Bad Day".)	—N/a	Modern Times
"Between the Lips (50cm)" (입술 사이)	2013	4	5	KOR: 436,249	—N/a	Modern Times
"A Gloomy Clock" (우울시계) (featuring Jonghyun of Shinee)	2013	6	11	KOR: 405,520	—N/a	Modern Times
"Modern Times"	2013	7	10	KOR: 424,678	—N/a	Modern Times
"Bad Day" (싫은 날)	2013	8	14	KOR: 342,058	—N/a	Modern Times
"Obliviate"	2013	11	23	KOR: 277,739 (Note: Sales figures for "Obliviate" and "Daydream".)	—N/a	Modern Times
"Daydream" (한낮의 꿈) (featuring Yang Hee-eun)	2013	12	15	KOR: 267,560	—N/a	Modern Times
"Havana"	2013	13	29	KOR: 220,376 (Note: Sales figures for "Havana", "Walk with Me, Girl", "Wait" and "Voice Mail" as of October 2013.)	—N/a	Modern Times
"Walk with Me, Girl" (아이야, 나랑 걷자) (featuring Choi Baek-ho)	2013	14	26	KOR: 211,360	—N/a	Modern Times
"Wait" (기다려)	2013	17	41	KOR: 188,745	—N/a	Modern Times
"Voice Mail (Korean version)"	2013	18	28	KOR: 188,063	—N/a	Modern Times
"Pastel Crayon" (크레파스) (from Bel Ami)	2013	39	27	KOR: 98,476 (Note: Sales figures for "Pastel Crayon" as of January 2014.)	—N/a	Modern Times – Epilogue
"The Meaning of You" (너의 의미) (featuring Kim Chang-wan; Sanulrim cover)	2014	3	2	KOR: 2,500,000	—N/a	A Flower Bookmark
"When Love Passes By" (사랑이 지나가면) (Lee Moon-se cover)	2014	4	3	KOR: 781,730	—N/a	A Flower Bookmark
"Pierrot Smiles at Us" (삐에로는 우릴 보고 웃지) (Kim Wan-sun cover)	2014	8	10	KOR: 499,054 (Note: Sales figures for "Pierrot Smiles at Us" and "Dreams in Summer Night" as of end of 2014.)	—N/a	A Flower Bookmark
"Dreams in Summer Night" (여름밤의 꿈) (Kim Hyun-sik cover)	2014	12	12	KOR: 465,318	—N/a	A Flower Bookmark
"Flower" (꽃) (Kim Kwang-seok cover)	2014	14	13	KOR: 353,253 (Note: Sales figures for "Flower", "Boom Ladi Dadi" and "Sing for Me" as of June 2014.)	—N/a	A Flower Bookmark
"Boom Ladi Dadi" (꿍따리 샤바라) (featuring Clon; Clon cover)	2014	16	14	KOR: 303,359	—N/a	A Flower Bookmark
"Sing for Me" (노래 불러줘요) (g.o.d feat. IU)	2014	9	—	KOR: 339,899	—N/a	Chapter 8
"The Shower" (푸르던)	2015	2	—	KOR: 1,014,210 (Note: Sales figures for "The Shower" as of September 2016.)	—N/a	Chat-Shire
"Shoes" (새 신발)	2015	5	—	KOR: 578,505 (Note: Sales figures for "Shoes" as of July 2016.)	—N/a	Chat-Shire
"Knees" (무릎)	2015	5	—	KOR: 730,323 (Note: Sales figures for "Knees" as of September 2016.)	—N/a	Chat-Shire
"Zezé"	2015	8	—	KOR: 796,704 (Note: Sales figures for "Zezé" as of July 2016.)	—N/a	Chat-Shire
"Red Queen" (featuring Zion.T)	2015	10	—	KOR: 427,439 (Note: Sales figures for "Red Queen" and "Glasses" as of 2015.)	—N/a	Chat-Shire
"Glasses" (안경)	2015	13	—	KOR: 362,363	—N/a	Chat-Shire
"Ending Scene" (이런 엔딩)	2017	3	—	KOR: 2,500,000 (Note: Sales figures for "Ending Scene" and "Dlwlrma" as of December 2017.)	—N/a	Palette
"Dlwlrma" (이 지금)	2017	5	—	KOR: 2,500,000	—N/a	Palette
"Jam Jam" (잼잼)	2017	7	—	KOR: 461,247 (Note: Sales figures for "Jam Jam" as of July 2017.)	—N/a	Palette
"Dear Name" (이름에게)	2017	9	—	KOR: 2,500,000 (Note: Sales figures for "Dear Name" as of December 2017.)	—N/a	Palette
"Black Out"	2017	14	—	KOR: 283,532 (Note: Sales figures for "Black Out" and "Full-Stop" as of May 2017.)	—N/a	Palette
"Full-Stop" (마침표)	2017	16	—	KOR: 246,926	—N/a	Palette
"Love Alone" (그렇게 사랑은)	2017	19	—	KOR: 201,511 (Note: Sales figures for "Love Alone" as of May 2017.)	—N/a	Palette
"Secret Garden" (비밀의 화원) (Lee Tzsche cover)	2017	10	—	KOR: 466,059 (Note: Sales figures for "Secret Garden" as of September 2017.)	—N/a	A Flower Bookmark 2
"Every Day with You" (매일 그대와) (Deulgukhwa cover)	2017	12	—	KOR: 325,396 (Note: Sales figures for "Every Day with You" and "Last Night Story" as of October 2017.)	—N/a	A Flower Bookmark 2
"Last Night Story" (어젯밤 이야기) (Sobangcha cover)	2017	15	—	KOR: 301,981	—N/a	A Flower Bookmark 2
"By the Stream" (개여울) (Jeong Mi-jo cover)	2017	19	—	KOR: 178,956 (Note: Sales figures for "By the Stream" as of October 2017.)	—N/a	A Flower Bookmark 2
"Road" (g.o.d song by IU, Henry Lau, Jo Hyun-ah, and Yang Da-il)	2019	14	—	—N/a	—N/a	Then & Now
"Above the Time" (시간의 바깥)	2019	5	6	—N/a	—N/a	Love Poem
"Unlucky"	2019	8	9	—N/a	—N/a	Love Poem
"The Visitor" (그 사람)	2019	10	15	—N/a	—N/a	Love Poem
"Lullaby" (자장가)	2019	14	17	—N/a	—N/a	Love Poem
"Flu"	2021	7	6	—N/a	—N/a	Lilac
"Hi Spring Bye" (봄 안녕 봄)	2021	8	5	—N/a	—N/a	Lilac
"Troll" (돌림노래) (featuring Dean)	2021	10	9	—N/a	—N/a	Lilac
"Empty Cup" (빈 컵)	2021	19	13	—N/a	—N/a	Lilac
"My Sea" (아이와 나의 바다)	2021	11	9	—N/a	—N/a	Lilac
"Ah Puh" (어푸)	2021	13	11	—N/a	—N/a	Lilac
"Epilogue" (에필로그)	2021	17	12	—N/a	—N/a	Lilac
"Drama" (드라마)	2021	8	7	—N/a	KMCA: Platinum (Note: Certification for streaming)	Pieces
"Next Stop" (정거장)	2021	18	23	—N/a	—N/a	Pieces
"You" (너)	2021	26	32	—N/a	—N/a	Pieces
"Love Letter" (러브레터)	2021	23	31	—N/a	—N/a	Pieces
"Shh.." (featuring Hyein, Wonsun Joe and Patti Kim)	2024	20	—	—N/a	—N/a	The Winning
"I Stan U" (관객이 될게)	2024	23	—	—N/a	—N/a	The Winning
"Red Sneakers" (빨간 운동화)	2025	26	—	—N/a	—N/a	A Flower Bookmark 3
"October 4th" (10월 4일)	2025	38	—	—N/a	—N/a	A Flower Bookmark 3
"Last Scene" (featuring Wonstein)	2025	39	—	—N/a	—N/a	A Flower Bookmark 3
"Beautiful Person" (미인) (featuring Balming Tiger)	2025	51	—	—N/a	—N/a	A Flower Bookmark 3
"Square's Dream" (네모의 꿈)	2025	9	—	—N/a	—N/a	A Flower Bookmark 3
"—" denotes releases that did not chart or were not released in that region.

== Other appearances ==
Song	Year	Other artists	Album
"All You Need Is Love" (The Beatles cover)	2009	Zitten and Ran	MBC Music Travel LaLaLa Live Vol. 5
"I Don't Know About Love Yet" (Lee Ji-yeon cover)	2009		MBC Music Travel LaLaLa Live Vol. 5
"I Hope"	2009	Mighty Mouth	Love Class
"247"	2009	The Three Views	The Three Views: Part 3
"You Are Stunning"	2009	Run	Face-Off
"My Dream Is to Be a Patissiere"	2010		Yumeiro Patissiere
"Why"	2010	Supreme Team, Young-jun	Ames Room
"Gift"	2010	various artists	Road for Hope
"Let's Go"	2010	various artists	Non-album song
"Alicia"	2011		Non-album song
"Dreaming"	2011		Dream High
"Suga Luv" (Valentine Mix)	2011	Bizniz	The Brand New
"I Hoppin U" (Note: This is an altered version of the singer's 2010 song "Merry Christmas in Advance" with different lyrics.)	2011		Non-album song
"Let's Catch the Bus"	2011		Non-album song
"Melody of the Wind"	2011		Leafie, A Hen into the Wild
"Memories of the Sea"	2011		Non-album song
"Stranded" (Korean version)	2012		A Turtle's Tale 2: Sammy's Escape from Paradise
"Atreia"	2012		Non-album song
"Beautiful Song"	2013	Jo Jung-suk	You Are the Best!
"You Are A Miracle"	2013	various artists	SBS Gayo Daejun 'Friendship Project'
"Take Care of My Dad"	2015		Non-album song
"My Dear Friend"	2016		Moon Lovers: Scarlet Heart Ryeo
"She's Different from Me"	2017	Lee Hyo-ri	Hyori's Homestay
"With the Heart to Forget You" (Note: "With the Heart to Forget You" by late Kim Kwang-seok was originally going to be included in A Flower Bookmark 2, but, due to the revelations surrounding the death of Kim's daughter, Fave Entertainment decided to remove the track.)	2018		Non-album song
"Happy Ending"	2019		Hotel del Luna
"One Step"	2023	Miral School	Non-album song
