= IU HEREH World Tour =

2024 concert tour by IU

- Tour by IU
- Location: Asia; Europe; North America
- Associated album: The Winning
- Start date: March 2, 2024
- End date: September 22, 2024
- No. of shows: 31

IU concert chronology
- The Golden Hour: Under the Orange Sun (2022); HEREH World Tour (2024); IU World Tour Concert (2027)

The HEREH World Tour (originally titled H.E.R.) was the first world tour and ninth concert tour overall by South Korean singer IU in support of her sixth extended play The Winning (2024). The tour began on March 2, 2024, in Seoul, South Korea and concluded on September 22, 2024, in Seoul, South Korea. The tour consisted of concerts in 18 cities across Asia, North America and Europe.

== Background and development ==
IU announced that she would be holding her first worldwide concert tour on January 16, 2024. Originally titled H.E.R. World Tour, the concert name was changed to HEREH World Tour as of April 15, 2024. The tour was her first tour since the Love, Poem Tour in 2019.

The European leg at the end of June 2024 marked her first solo concert tour in the English-speaking world outside of Asia.

== Critical reception ==
Professional ratings
Review scores
Source	Rating
NME	5/5 stars

NME's Rhian Daly praised IU's performance at Seoul's KSPO Dome, for its creativity and immersive experience. He highlighted how placing her stage in the center of the venue broke down barriers between IU and her audience, enhancing the connection between her and her fans. The production design transformed the stage into various settings, enriching the storytelling. Divided into emotive sections, the setlist showcased IU's vocal talent and included special guest appearances.

=== Accolades ===
The concert tour received the Stage of the Year award at the 2024 Melon Music Awards.

== Commercial performance ==
In Billboard's Top 10 Highest-Grossing K-pop Tours of 2024 list, the IU HEREH World Tour ranked at number six, with 92,600 tickets sold from eight shows and $16.6 million in revenue.

== Setlist ==
The following set list is from the concert in Seoul, South Korea, and is not intended to represent all shows throughout the tour.

Part 1 – Hypnotic

1. "Holssi" (rock version)
2. "Jam Jam"
3. "Ah Puh"
4. "Bbibbi"
5. "Obliviate"

Part 2 – Energetic

6. "Celebrity"
7. "Blueming"
8. "Coin"
9. "Eight"
10. "Hold My Hand"
11. "I Stan U"

Part 3 – Romantic

12. "Havana"
13. "Meaning of You"
14. "Friday"
15. "Strawberry Moon"
16. "Through the Night"

Part 4 – Ecstatic

17. "Shopper"
18. "Above the Time"
19. "You & I"
20. "Love Wins All"

Encore – Heroic

21. "Shh.."
22. "Twenty-Three"
23. "Holssi" (reprise)

En-encore

24. "Ice Flower"
25. "Red Queen"
26. "Love of B"
27. "Ending Scene"
28. "Winter Sleep"
29. "Someday"
30. "The Red Shoes"
31. "Last Night Story"
32. "You Know"
33. "Shopper"
34. "Epilogue"

=== Covers ===
IU performed covers of songs by local artists in several cities, including "The One and Only" by Accusefive in Taipei, "Solitude" by Terence Lam in Hong Kong, "Pasilyo" by SunKissed Lola in Santa Maria, "Like a Star" by Corinne Bailey Rae in London, and "First Love" by Nont Tanont in Bangkok.

== Tour dates ==
List of tour dates
Date (2024)	City	Country	Venue	Guests	Attendance
March 2	Seoul	South Korea	KSPO Dome	NewJeans	52,320
March 3	Seoul	South Korea	KSPO Dome	Riize	52,320
March 9	Seoul	South Korea	KSPO Dome	Le Sserafim	52,320
March 10	Seoul	South Korea	KSPO Dome	Park Bo-gum	52,320
March 23	Yokohama	Japan	Yokohama Arena	—	—
March 24	Yokohama	Japan	Yokohama Arena	—	—
April 6	Taipei	Taiwan	Taipei Arena	—	24,000
April 7	Taipei	Taiwan	Taipei Arena	—	24,000
April 20	Singapore		Singapore Indoor Stadium	—	17,400
April 21	Singapore		Singapore Indoor Stadium	—	17,400
April 27	Tangerang (Note: Promoted as Jakarta)	Indonesia	ICE BSD Hall 5-6	—	—
April 28	Tangerang	Indonesia	ICE BSD Hall 5-6	—	—
May 25	Hong Kong		AsiaWorld–Arena	—	—
May 26	Hong Kong		AsiaWorld–Arena	—	—
June 1	Santa Maria (Note: Promoted as Manila)	Philippines	Philippine Arena	—	37,000
June 8	Kuala Lumpur	Malaysia	Axiata Arena	—	—
June 9	Kuala Lumpur	Malaysia	Axiata Arena	—	—
June 21	London	England	OVO Arena Wembley	—	10,000 (Note: All 8 shows in Europe and North America reached a total audience of 92,600, of which approximately 10,000 attendees were at the London show and 10,000 attendees at the Inglewood show, leaving 72,600 attendees at the remaining shows.)
June 23	Berlin	Germany	Uber Arena	—	
June 29	Pak Kret (Note: Promoted as Bangkok)	Thailand	Impact Challenger Hall 1	—	—
June 30	Pak Kret	Thailand	Impact Challenger Hall 1	—	—
July 6	Osaka	Japan	Asue Arena Osaka	—	—
July 7	Osaka	Japan	Asue Arena Osaka	—	—
July 15	Newark	United States	Prudential Center	—	72,600
July 19	Atlanta	United States	State Farm Arena	—	72,600
July 22	Washington, D.C.	United States	Capital One Arena	—	72,600
July 25	Rosemont	United States	Allstate Arena	—	72,600
July 30	Oakland	United States	Oakland Arena	—	72,600
August 2	Inglewood (Note: Promoted as Los Angeles)	United States	Kia Forum	—	10,000
September 21	Seoul	South Korea	Seoul World Cup Stadium	—	—
September 22	Seoul	South Korea	Seoul World Cup Stadium	—	—

== Personnel ==
Artist

- IU

Band

- Hong Sojin - Bandmaster and 1st Keyboard
- Kim Hyun - 2nd Keyboard
- Kim Dongmin - Guitar
- Choi Insung - Bass
- Kim Seungho - Drum
- Cho Jaebum - Percussion
