= List of Gaon Digital Chart number ones of 2019 =

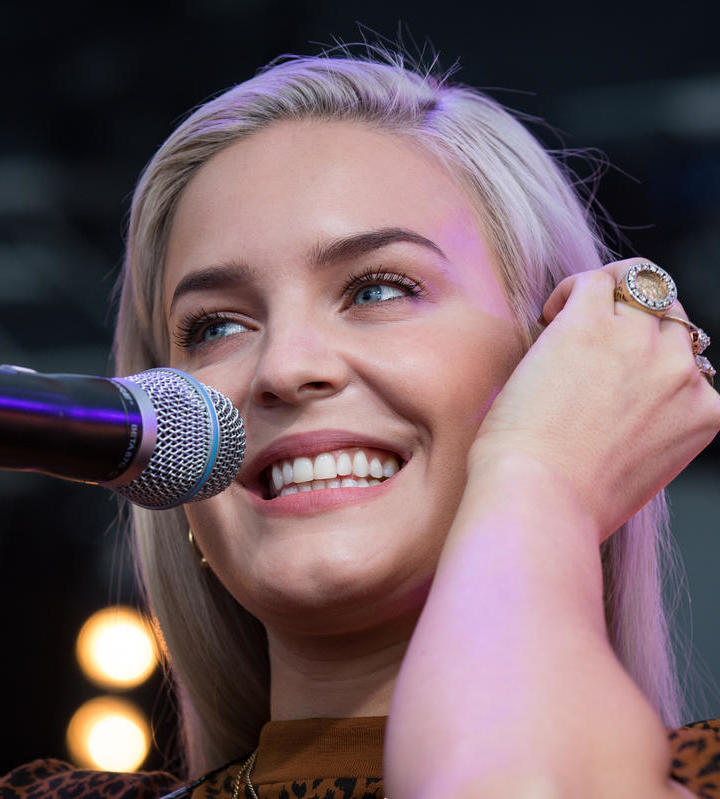
English singer-songwriter Anne-Marie's "2002" was the best-performing song of 2019, making it the first foreign song to top the yearly chart.

The Gaon Digital Chart is a chart that ranks the best-performing singles in South Korea. Managed by the domestic Ministry of Culture, Sports and Tourism (MCST), its data is compiled by the Korea Music Content Industry Association and published by the Gaon Music Chart. The ranking is based collectively on each single's download sales, stream count, and background music use. In mid-2008, the Recording Industry Association of Korea ceased publishing music sales data. The MCST established a process to collect music sales in 2009, and began publishing its data with the introduction of the Gaon Music Chart the following February. With the creation of the Gaon Digital Chart, digital data for individual songs was provided in the country for the first time. Gaon provides weekly (listed from Sunday to Saturday), monthly and yearly charts. Below is a list of singles that topped the weekly and monthly charts.

== Weekly charts ==
Week ending date	Song	Artist(s)	Ref.
January 5	"180 Degrees" (180도)	Ben	
January 12	"After You've Gone" (넘쳐흘러)	MC the Max	
January 19	"After You've Gone" (넘쳐흘러)	MC the Max	
January 26	"After You've Gone" (넘쳐흘러)	MC the Max	
February 2	"Fire Up" (이 노래가 클럽에서 나온다면 (Note: Literally translates to "If this song comes on in the club"))	Woody	
February 9	"Fire Up" (이 노래가 클럽에서 나온다면)	Woody	
February 16	"Fire Up" (이 노래가 클럽에서 나온다면)	Woody	
February 23	"Twit" (멍청이)	Hwasa	
March 2	"Rooftop" (옥탑방)	N.Flying	
March 9	"Rooftop" (옥탑방)	N.Flying	
March 16	"Lovedrunk" (술이 달다)	Epik High featuring Crush	
March 23	"Maybe It's Not Our Fault" (그건 아마 우리의 잘못은 아닐 거야)	Baek Ye-rin	
March 30	"Four Seasons" (사계)	Taeyeon	
April 6	"Four Seasons" (사계)	Taeyeon	
April 13	"Bom" (나만, 봄)	Bolbbalgan4	
April 20	"Boy with Luv" (작은 것들을 위한 시)	BTS featuring Halsey	
April 27	"Boy with Luv" (작은 것들을 위한 시)	BTS featuring Halsey	
May 4	"Boy with Luv" (작은 것들을 위한 시)	BTS featuring Halsey	
May 11	"Goodbye"	Park Hyo-shin	
May 18	"For Lovers Who Hesitate" (주저하는 연인들을 위해)	Jannabi	
May 25	"If There Was Practice in Love" (사랑에 연습이 있었다면)	Lim Jae-hyun	
June 1	"If There Was Practice in Love" (사랑에 연습이 있었다면)	Lim Jae-hyun	
June 8	"If There Was Practice in Love" (사랑에 연습이 있었다면)	Lim Jae-hyun	
June 15	"To Be Honest" (솔직하게 말해서 나 김나영)	Kim Na-young	
June 22	"To Be Honest" (솔직하게 말해서 나 김나영)	Kim Na-young	
June 29	"Drunk on Love" (술이 문제야)	Jang Hye-jin and Yoon Min-soo	
July 6	"Drunk on Love" (술이 문제야)	Jang Hye-jin and Yoon Min-soo	
July 13	"Thank You for Goodbye" (헤어져줘서 고마워)	Ben	
July 20	"Thank You for Goodbye" (헤어져줘서 고마워)	Ben	
July 27	"All About You" (그대라는 시)	Taeyeon	
August 3	"All About You" (그대라는 시)	Taeyeon	
August 10	"Remember Me" (기억해줘요 내 모든 날과 그때를)	Gummy	
August 17	"So Long" (안녕)	Paul Kim	
August 24	"Done for Me"	Punch	
August 31	"So Long" (안녕)	Paul Kim	
September 7	"So Long" (안녕)	Paul Kim	
September 14	"So Long" (안녕)	Paul Kim	
September 21	"Workaholic" (워커홀릭)	Bolbbalgan4	
September 28	"Your Shampoo Scent in the Flowers" (흔들리는 꽃들 속에서 네 샴푸향이 느껴진거야)	Jang Beom-june	
October 5	"How Can I Love the Heartbreak, You're the One I Love" (어떻게 이별까지 사랑하겠어, 널 사랑하는 거지)	AKMU	
October 12	"How Can I Love the Heartbreak, You're the One I Love" (어떻게 이별까지 사랑하겠어, 널 사랑하는 거지)	AKMU	
October 19	"How Can I Love the Heartbreak, You're the One I Love" (어떻게 이별까지 사랑하겠어, 널 사랑하는 거지)	AKMU	
October 26	"How Can I Love the Heartbreak, You're the One I Love" (어떻게 이별까지 사랑하겠어, 널 사랑하는 거지)	AKMU	
November 2	"Fame"	MC Mong featuring Song Ga-in and Chancellor	
November 9	"Love Poem"	IU	
November 16	"Late Night" (늦은 밤 너의 집 앞 골목길에서)	Noel	
November 23	"Blueming"	IU	
November 30	"Blueming"	IU	
December 7	"Blueming"	IU	
December 14	"Blueming"	IU	
December 21	"Square (2017)"	Baek Ye-rin	
December 28	"Meteor"	Changmo	

== Monthly charts ==
Key
†	Indicates best-performing single of 2019

Month	Song	Artist(s)	Ref.
January	"After You've Gone" (넘쳐흘러)	MC the Max	
February	"Fire Up" (이 노래가 클럽에서 나온다면)	Woody	
March	"Rooftop" (옥탑방)	N.Flying	
April	"Bom" (나만, 봄)	Bolbbalgan4	
May	"For Lovers Who Hesitate" (주저하는 연인들을 위해)	Jannabi	
June	"2002" †	Anne-Marie	
July	"Drunk on Love" (술이 문제야)	Jang Hye-jin and Yoon Min-soo	
August	"Remember Me" (기억해줘요 내 모든 날과 그때를)	Gummy	
September	"So Long" (안녕)	Paul Kim	
October	"How Can I Love the Heartbreak, You're the One I Love" (어떻게 이별까지 사랑하겠어, 널 사랑하는 거지)	AKMU	
November	"Love Poem"	IU	
December	"Blueming"	IU	
