= 2002 (song) =

2018 single by Anne-Marie

Single by Anne-Marie

from the album Speak Your Mind
- Released: 20 April 2018
- Genre: Pop; bubblegum pop
- Length: 3:07
- Label: Asylum; Major Tom’s; Warner Bros.
- Songwriters: Benjamin Levin; Julia Cavazos; Steve McCutcheon; Edward Christopher Sheeran; Anne-Marie Nicholson; Andreas Carlsson; George Clinton; El DeBarge; Randy DeBarge; Jay E; Ice-T; Etterlene Jordan; Kristian Lundin; Max Martin; Cornell Haynes; Alphonso Henderson; Jake Schulze; City Spud
- Producer: Steve Mac

Anne-Marie singles chronology
"Friends" (2018)	"2002" (2018)	"Let Me Live" (2018)

Music video
- "2002" on YouTube

"2002" is a song by English singer and songwriter Anne-Marie from her debut studio album Speak Your Mind (2018). It was released on 20 April 2018, as the sixth single from the album, 7 days before the album's release. She co-wrote the song with fellow English singer Ed Sheeran, alongside Julia Michaels, Benny Blanco, and its sole producer, Steve Mac. Other people officially credited as co-writers are Andreas Carlsson, George Clinton of Parliament-Funkadelic, El and Randy DeBarge, Jay E, Ice-T, Etterlene Jordan, Kristian Lundin, Max Martin, Nelly, Alphonso Henderson, Jake Schulze, and City Spud, due to co-writing or being sampled on one of the songs referenced in the chorus.

"2002" received generally positive reviews from music critics and was a commercial success, becoming one of Anne-Marie's most successful singles worldwide. It peaked at number three on the UK singles chart, becoming Anne-Marie's fourth top-ten single at the time. The song has also reached the top-ten in nine other countries, including Australia, where it reached number four, Scotland where it peaked at number 3 and Ireland where it peaked at number 2. It was a massive success in South Korea, topping the country's year-end chart in 2019. It was the first non-Korean track on the chart to achieve this result, as well as being the only foreign song, and second overall, to surpass 2.2 billion digital index points on Gaon. "2002" is also the fourth longest charting song in Melon history, leaving the chart after 145 weeks and the only non-Korean song to be streamed over 350 million times on the platform.

== Background ==
"2002" is a love ballad about a childhood romance of Anne-Marie's that took place in the titular year. She wrote the song with Ed Sheeran, Benny Blanco, Julia Michaels and Steve Mac. She was not initially planning to release "2002" as a single, but finally caved in after constant pestering from Sheeran on Instagram to bring it out.

The beginning of the song's chorus, "Oops, I got 99 problems singing 'bye, bye, bye' / Hold up, if you wanna go and take a ride with me / Better hit me, baby, one more time", references six songs released between 1998 and 2004: "...Baby One More Time", "Oops!... I Did It Again", "99 Problems", "Bye Bye Bye", "The Next Episode" and "Ride wit Me". In an interview with Polish music magazine luvPOP, Anne-Marie explained the song: "It is all about that year, when I was that age just listening to that music that I loved at that time. You know, Christina Aguilera, Missy Elliott. All of these songs...Yeah, it just takes me back to that time." In a March 2017 interview, she mentioned Alanis Morissette as a big influence on her while growing up.

== Composition ==
"2002" is originally in the key of E major with a tempo of 96 beats per minute and a time signature of 4/4. The chord progression E–B–C♯m–G♯m–A–B–E is used in the verses; the progression C♯m–A–E–B–A–B in the pre-choruses and bridge, A–E–B–C♯m in the choruses, and E–B–C♯m–A (the I–V–vi–IV progression) after the last chorus.

== Music video ==
The official music video was directed by Hannah Lux Davis, who also directed the video for Anne-Marie's previous single "Friends". It was filmed in London and uploaded to YouTube on 8 May 2018. It features Anne-Marie recreating the videos of the songs referenced in the chorus; as well as Cerys Hill as young Anne-Marie.

As of September 2026, the video has gained over 1 billion views and 5.8 million likes.

== Commercial performance ==
"2002" reached the top-ten in 10 countries, and has been certified platinum or multi-platinum in most territories where it charted. By April 2026, the song had been used in over 14.3 million TikTok videos, ranking 72nd among the most-used songs on the platform worldwide. As of September 2026, the song has accumulated over 1.91 billion streams on Spotify.

=== United Kingdom ===
On 27 April 2018, "2002" debuted at number 8 on the UK Singles Chart. In its sixth charting week, it rose to number 3, where it remained for 5 consecutive weeks. The song spent a total of 47 non-consecutive weeks on the chart and was certified 4× platinum by the British Phonographic Industry (BPI) for sales of 2,400,000 units. According to the Official Charts Company, "2002" was the twelfth biggest song of 2018 in the United Kingdom, and the seventh most streamed video track of the year. It also placed at number 88 on the 2019 year-end chart. As of 2023, "2002" is Anne-Marie's most streamed song in the UK, with over 274 million streams. It also placed at number 52 on the list of the most-streamed songs of all time in the UK.

=== South Korea ===
"2002" was a sleeper hit in South Korea, gaining widespread popularity a year after its original release. It first appeared on the Circle Weekly Digital Chart on 13 January 2019 at number 166. In the weeks that followed, the song steadily climbed the chart and eventually peaked at number 2 on 9 June 2019. The song topped the Circle Digital year-end Chart in 2019, earning 1,053,371,198 aggregate points. "2002" also ranked number one on both the Circle Streaming Yearly Chart and Circle Download Yearly Chart, making Anne-Marie the first and only foreign artist to achieve this feat. (Note: As of July 2025, Anne-Marie remains the only non-Korean artist to have a song reach number one on any of the Circle weekly or year-end charts (Digital, Streaming or Download). "2002" topped all three.) Additionally, "2002" is the only foreign-language song, and the second overall, to surpass 2.3 billion digital index points on the Circle Chart. The song maintained a strong chart presence in subsequent years, placing at number 14 on the Circle Digital Yearly Chart in 2020, number 40 in 2021, number 117 in 2022, number 145 in 2023, and number 168 in 2024.

In 2019, "2002" was also the most-streamed song on the South Korean music streaming service Melon. As of March 2023, "2002" is the fourth-longest-charting song in Melon history (145 weeks), and the only non-Korean song to surpass 350 million streams on the platform. It's the eighth most liked song on the platform, with 416,715 likes. As of 25 July 2025, it has spent 1,010 consecutive days on the Melon Daily Chart, which ranks the most listened-to songs on the platform.

== Charts ==
=== Weekly charts ===
Weekly chart performance for "2002"
Chart (2018–2021)	Peak position
Australia (ARIA)	4
Austria (Ö3 Austria Top 40)	9
Belgium (Ultratop 50 Flanders)	23
Canada Hot 100 (Billboard)	49
Croatia (HRT)	12
Czech Republic Airplay (ČNS IFPI)	2
Czech Republic Singles Digital (ČNS IFPI)	25
Denmark (Tracklisten)	31
Germany (GfK)	18
Global Excl. US (Billboard)	152
Greece International (IFPI Greece)	30
Hungary (Stream Top 40)	20
Ireland (IRMA)	2
Japan Hot 100 (Billboard)	74
Japan Hot Overseas (Billboard)	11
Lebanon (Lebanese Top 20)	18
Malaysia (RIM)	9
Netherlands (Single Top 100)	41
New Zealand (Recorded Music NZ)	12
Norway (VG-lista)	24
Poland Airplay (ZPAV)	44
Portugal (AFP)	57
Scottish Singles Sales (Official Charts)	3
Singapore (RIAS)	5
Slovakia Singles Digital (ČNS IFPI)	24
Slovenia (SloTop50)	18
South Korea (Gaon)	2
Sweden (Sverigetopplistan)	30
Switzerland (Schweizer Hitparade)	18
UK Singles (Official Charts)	3
US Bubbling Under Hot 100 (Billboard)	4
US Adult Pop Airplay (Billboard)	21
US Pop Airplay (Billboard)	30

=== Monthly charts ===
Monthly chart performance for "2002"
Chart (2019)	Peak position
South Korea (Gaon)	1

=== Year-end charts ===
2018 year-end chart performance for "2002"
Chart (2018)	Position
Australia (ARIA)	28
Austria (Ö3 Austria Top 40)	26
Belgium (Ultratop Flanders)	49
Denmark (Tracklisten)	76
Germany (Official German Charts)	94
Iceland (Plötutíóindi)	33
Ireland (IRMA)	6
New Zealand (Recorded Music NZ)	42
Portugal (AFP)	186
Sweden (Sverigetopplistan)	93
Switzerland (Schweizer Hitparade)	63
UK Singles (Official Charts Company)	12

2019 year-end chart performance for "2002"
Chart (2019)	Position
Australia (ARIA)	93
Iceland (Tónlistinn)	68
Portugal (AFP)	187
South Korea (Gaon)	1
UK Singles (Official Charts Company)	88

2020 year-end chart performance for "2002"
Chart (2020)	Position
South Korea (Gaon)	14

2021 year-end chart performance for "2002"
Chart (2021)	Position
South Korea (Gaon)	40

2022 year-end chart performance for "2002"
Chart (2022)	Position
South Korea (Circle)	117

2023 year-end chart performance for "2002"
Chart (2023)	Position
South Korea (Circle)	145

2024 year-end chart performance for "2002"
Chart (2024)	Position
South Korea (Circle)	168

== Certifications ==
Certifications and sales for "2002"
Region	Certification	Certified units/sales
Australia (ARIA)	8× Platinum	560,000^{‡}
Austria (IFPI Austria)	2× Platinum	60,000^{‡}
Belgium (BRMA)	Platinum	40,000^{‡}
Canada (Music Canada)	5× Platinum	400,000^{‡}
Denmark (IFPI Danmark)	2× Platinum	180,000^{‡}
France (SNEP)	Gold	100,000^{‡}
Germany (BVMI)	Platinum	400,000^{‡}
Italy (FIMI)	Gold	25,000^{‡}
New Zealand (RMNZ)	6× Platinum	180,000^{‡}
Norway (IFPI Norway)	2× Platinum	120,000^{‡}
Poland (ZPAV)	2× Platinum	100,000^{‡}
Portugal (AFP)	Platinum	10,000^{‡}
South Korea (KMCA)	Platinum	2,500,000^{*}
Spain (Promusicae)	Platinum	60,000^{‡}
Switzerland (IFPI Switzerland)	Platinum	20,000^{‡}
United Kingdom (BPI)	4× Platinum	2,400,000^{‡}
United States (RIAA)	2× Platinum	2,000,000^{‡}
Streaming
Japan (RIAJ)	2× Platinum	200,000,000^{†}
South Korea (KMCA)	3× Platinum	300,000,000^{†}
^{*} Sales figures based on certification alone.^{‡} Sales+streaming figures based on certification alone.^{†} Streaming-only figures based on certification alone.

== Release history ==
Region	Date	Format	Version	Label	Ref.
Various	20 April 2018	Digital download	Original	Asylum; Warner Bros.	
United Kingdom	8 June 2018	Digital download	Acoustic	Asylum; Warner Bros.	
United Kingdom	8 June 2018	Digital download	Remix EP	Asylum; Warner Bros.	
United States	6 August 2018	Hot adult contemporary	Original	Warner Bros.	
United States	7 August 2018	Contemporary hit radio	Original	Warner Bros.	
