= Pieces (EP) =

2021 special EP by IU

EP by IU
- Released: December 29, 2021
- Studios: Kakao Entertainment, 918 Studio, Seoul Studio, Prelude Studio
- Genres: Korean ballad; acoustic
- Length: 17:55
- Language: Korean
- Label: Edam
- Producer: IU

IU chronology
| Lilac (2021) | Pieces (2021) | The Winning (2024) |

Singles from Pieces
- 1. "Winter Sleep" Released: December 29, 2021

Pieces (Korean: 조각집; RR: Jogakjip) is the eighth extended play by South Korean singer-songwriter IU. It was released on December 29, 2021, through Edam Entertainment.

Initially released for digital download and streaming only, the physical CD was included in the DVD/Blu-ray box set of the documentary Pieces: 29th Winter, which was published on March 23, 2022. It was nominated for Album of the Year at the 2022 Melon Music Awards.

== Background and release ==
On December 22, 2021, Edam Entertainment released a teaser image for the EP through its social media account. The monochrome image contained books titled like IU's previously released singles, interspersed with colored sheets indicating the period of composition of the songs of the new release. On December 28, a live clip of the song "Next Stop" was released on the company's YouTube channel.

The disc collects five acoustic and orchestral songs, entirely in Korean, written, composed, arranged and produced by IU over the years, performed at concerts and events with fans, but never released, and which represent "pieces" of her twenties.

== Composition ==
"Drama" was written when IU was 20 for a friend who was feeling down after experiencing a break up with her boyfriend. IU started making "Next Stop" when she was 25 and completed it at 26, writing the second verse taking inspiration from the character Lee Ji-an, who she played in My Mister. The song talks about waiting for someone without any promise of meeting, and the meaning is that there is a train stop between Lee Ji-eun and Lee Ji-an.

"Winter Sleep" commemorates the deaths of loved ones with metaphors that connect to the four seasons, telling the story of the first year without them and concluding with a farewell. IU started making it at 27 and finished it at 29 after having lived through important separations, thinking about what remained in the world once a person died. "You" was written at 24 during a few days' stay in the mountains to shoot Moon Lovers: Scarlet Heart Ryeo, and talks about missing her upstairs resident friend, actress Yoo In-na. The song is placed between Chat-Shire (2015) and Palette (2017), in the year in which the singer took a break after 14 years of activity, and that acted as a stepping stone for her to mature.

The disc is closed by "Love Letter", written between 26 and 28, and was listed on Jung Sung-hwan's extended play Five Words Left Unsaid. The lyrics were written as a love letter left by an elderly person to their partner before dying, and the last verse, "More than anywhere else, I'll stay inside you" (Korean: 어디보다 그대 안에 나 머물러 있다오), was the starting point for "Epilogue", the final song in IU's fifth album, Lilac.

About Pieces, the singer declared: "These songs are individually precious to me and a part of my memories, but rather than a complete picture on their own, I think it is more appropriate to describe them as pieces that make up an image. Thus, these five songs put together form a complete picture."

== Commercial performance ==
Upon release, all the tracks from Pieces charted in the Gaon Weekly Digital Chart Top 30, with "Winter Sleep" topping the chart on the following week.

== Critical reception ==
For South Korean culture magazine Ize, "All the simple sounds it contains dig into the heart with sincerity and subtlety. [...] Pieces is an album that is more confession than healing," concluding "All the songs convey the sincerity of a letter." Newsen spoke of the album as "a bundle of more sincere stories from the human Lee Ji-eun."

Reviewing for Newsis, Lee Jae-hoon felt that the sincerity of the lyrics and the production, which managed to "organically weave together tracks that were pieces in their own right," had "painted the scenery of a song that was lost in time. In this way, the puzzle of the 20-year-old IU, who will turn 30 next year according to the Korean age, was put together naturally." He concluded his review by writing, "The reason this collection deserves to be valued higher is for IU's ability to sublimate her seniors' magnetism, whom she has been influenced by, into her own personality. The wit of the first track 'Drama' reminds us of Yoo Young-seok's songs 'Blue Sky' and 'W.H.I.T.E.', and the last track 'Love Letter' reminds of 'The Letter' by Kim Kwang-jin. Not everyone can imprint their seal without forgetting their roots in Korean pop music."

== Track listing ==
All tracks are written by IU

| No. | Title | Arrangement | Length |
|---|---|---|---|
| 1. | "Drama" (드라마) | IU | 2:09 |
| 2. | "Next Stop" (정거장; Jeonggeojang) | IU | 3:57 |
| 3. | "Winter Sleep" (겨울잠; Gyeouljam) | Seo Dong-hwan | 4:23 |
| 4. | "You" (너; Neo) | IU | 3:27 |
| 5. | "Love Letter" (러브레터) | Hong So-jin | 3:59 |
| Total length: | | | 17:55 |

== Personnel ==
Credits taken from Mania Database.

- Choi In-sung – bass (tracks 3, 5)
- Choi Ja-yeon – mixing assistance (track 3)
- Eastbeam – recording (tracks 1–2)
- Hong So-jin – arrangements (track 5), piano (tracks 1, 4–5), chorus (track 5)
- IU – lyrics, composing, arrangements (tracks 1–2, 4), recorder (track 1), chorus (tracks 1–2, 4), whistle (track 2)
- Jo Jae-beom – percussions (track 1)
- Jo Joon-sung – mixing (track 3)
- Jukjae – guitar (tracks 1–2)
- Jung Gi-hong – recording (tracks 2–3)
- Jung Seok-hoon – guitar (track 4)
- Kim Dong-min – guitar (track 5)
- Kim Ji-ah – guitar (track 3)
- Kim Seung-ho – drums (tracks 3, 5)
- Kwon Nam-woo – mastering (tracks 1–4)
- Lee Chang-sun – recording (tracks 3–4)
- Lee Chan-mi – recording (tracks 2–3)
- Park Hyuk – mixing (track 5)
- Seo Dong-hwan – strings arrangements (tracks 2–3), arrangements (track 3), piano (track 3)
- Son Myung-gap – recording (tracks 1–4), mixing (tracks 1–2, 4)
- Yoong String – strings (tracks 2–3)

== Charts ==
=== Weekly charts ===
Weekly chart performance for Pieces
| Chart (2021) | Peak position |
|---|---|
| Japan Hot Albums (Billboard Japan) | 56 |
| Japan Top Download Albums Chart (Billboard Japan) | 18 |

== Accolades ==
Name of the award ceremony, year presented, category, nominee of the award, and the result of the nomination
| Award ceremony | Year | Category | Nominee(s) / Work(s) | Result | Ref. |
|---|---|---|---|---|---|
| Asian Pop Music Awards | 2022 | Top 20 Albums of the Year (Overseas) | Pieces | Won | |
| Asian Pop Music Awards | 2022 | Song of the Year (Overseas) | "Drama" | Nominated | |
| Asian Pop Music Awards | 2022 | Best Lyricist (Overseas) | "Winter Sleep" | Nominated | |
| Golden Disc Awards | 2023 | Digital Song Bonsang | "Drama" | Nominated | |
| Melon Music Awards | 2022 | Album of the Year | Pieces | Nominated | |
| Mnet Asian Music Awards | 2022 | Best Vocal Performance – Solo | "Drama" | Nominated | |
| Mnet Asian Music Awards | 2022 | Song of the Year | "Drama" | Longlisted | |
