= Love Poem (song) =

2019 single by IU

Single by IU

from the EP Love Poem
- Language: Korean
- Released: November 1, 2019
- Genre: Korean Ballad
- Length: 4:18
- Label: Kakao M
- Songwriters: IU; Lee Jong-hoon

IU singles chronology
"Bbibbi" (2018)	"Love Poem" (2019)	"Blueming" (2019)

"Love Poem" is a song by South Korean singer-songwriter IU, released by Kakao M as the lead single from her seventh Korean-language EP Love Poem on November 1, 2019. It debuted at number 11 on the Gaon Digital Chart before topping the chart the following week, becoming IU's 21st number-one single in South Korea, and extending her record for the most number ones on the chart.

== Background and composition ==
IU wrote the ballad to support loved ones who are going through hard times, saying: "It is difficult to see the person you love is becoming isolated. It is painful not doing anything for that situation and just watching over it."

"Love Poem" was written by IU and Lee Jong-hoon. Tamar Herman of Billboard described it as "a poignant, inspiring ballad full of warmth and comfort".

== Critical reception ==
Writing for The Straits Times, Jan Lee commented that the song "feels particularly poignant given that IU lost one of her close friends, K-pop star Sulli, to a suspected suicide last month".

== Accolades ==
Music program awards
Program	Date	Ref.
Show! Music Core	November 16, 2019	
Show! Music Core	November 23, 2019	
Inkigayo	November 17, 2019	
Music Bank	November 29, 2019	

Melon Popularity Award
Award	Date	Ref.
Weekly Popularity Award	November 11, 2019	
Weekly Popularity Award	November 18, 2019	

== Charts ==
=== Weekly charts ===
Chart (2019)	Peak position
South Korea (Hot 100)	1
South Korea (Gaon)	1
US World Digital Song Sales (Billboard)	9

=== Year-end charts ===
Chart (2019)	Position
South Korea (Gaon)	76

Chart (2020)	Position
South Korea (Gaon)	22

Chart (2021)	Position
South Korea (Gaon)	66

Chart (2022)	Position
South Korea (Circle)	166

== Certifications ==
Certifications and sales for "Love Poem"
Region	Certification	Certified units/sales
Streaming
South Korea (KMCA)	2× Platinum	200,000,000^{†}
^{†} Streaming-only figures based on certification alone.

== Release history ==
Region	Date	Format	Label	Ref.
Various	November 1, 2019	Digital download, streaming	Kakao M	

== See also ==
- List of Gaon Digital Chart number ones of 2019
- List of Kpop Hot 100 number ones
