= Blueming (song) =

2019 single by IU

Single by IU

from the EP Love Poem
- Language: Korean
- Released: November 18, 2019
- Genre: Pop rock; electro
- Length: 3:37
- Label: Kakao M
- Songwriters: IU; Lee Jong-hoon; Lee Chae-kyu
- Producers: Lee Jong-hoon; Lee Chae-kyu

IU singles chronology
"Love Poem" (2019)	"Blueming" (2019)	"First Winter" (2019)

Music video
- "Blueming" on YouTube

"Blueming" is a song by South Korean singer-songwriter IU, serving as the second single from her seventh Korean-language extended play (EP) Love Poem. It was released on November 18, 2019, through Kakao M, and was co-written by IU, Lee Jong-hoon and Lee Chae-kyu, with production handled by the latter two. Lyrically, the song expresses the sentiments of what it means to live and love in modern-day society.

Commercially, the song was a success in South Korea, topping the Gaon Digital Chart and became her 15th number-one single and 22nd number-one song overall. Additionally, "Blueming" achieved the number one position on the Billboard K-pop Hot 100 and ranked number five on the year-end Gaon Digital Chart for 2020. It won the Digital Daesang award at the 35th Golden Disc Awards in January 2021.

== Background ==
"Blueming" was released for digital download and streaming as the second single off of IU's seventh Korean-language extended play, titled Love Poem, on November 18, 2019. It was released through various music portals, including iTunes, in conjunction with the release of the EP. The song was written and composed by IU along with Lee Jong-hoon and Lee Chae-kyu, who had both worked on the composition for IU's 2015 song "Twenty-Three".

"Blueming" – IU
A 22-second sample of the pop-rock and electro song "Blueming".

== Music and lyrics ==
Musically, "Blueming" is composed in the key of C major with a tempo of 106 beats per minute, and has a runtime of 3:37. A vivacious pop-rock number, it continues her color-oriented lyrics featured in her previous albums Chat-Shire (2015) and Palette (2017). Lyrically, the songwriting explores the themes of everyday anxieties of modern-day romance in an increasingly online and technological world, and how she has come "into bloom" with an unattainable relationship and her personal life. Tamar Herman of Billboard analyzed the song's lyrical message by writing, "IU sings calmly in an upbeat manner about the blue-ming emotions of sending small flower-like texts to the object of her affection, [...] creating a song that is a perfect representation of what it means to live and love at the end of a decade that has seen lives turned upside-down due to the impact of social media and technology."

== Commercial performance ==
The song debuted at number one on the Gaon Digital Chart, becoming IU's 15th number one single and 22nd number-one song overall in South Korea, further extending her record for the most number one songs out of any South Korean artist. In addition, "Blueming" achieved the number-one spot on the Billboard K-pop Hot 100, becoming her eleventh number-one single on the Korean Billboard chart. More than a year later, the song maintained its position as one of the best performing singles in the country, ranking at number five on the year-end Gaon Digital Chart for 2020. In the United States, the song peaked at number 10 on the US World Digital Song Sales chart in the week of November 29, 2019.

== Promotion ==
The official music video for "Blueming" was uploaded to the YouTube channel of 1theK, a brand under Kakao M, simultaneously with the release of the single on November 18, 2019. As of December 2022, the music video has garnered over 153 million views on YouTube. To promote the song, IU performed "Blueming" on her 2019 IU Tour Concert "Love, Poem", which spanned 15 shows across East and Southeast Asia throughout November and December 2019.

== Accolades ==
Awards for "Blueming"
Year	Organization	Award	Result	Ref.
2020	Mnet Asian Music Awards	Best Vocal Performance Solo	Won	
2020	Mnet Asian Music Awards	Song of the Year	Nominated	
2021	Golden Disc Awards	Digital Daesang	Won	
2021	Golden Disc Awards	Digital Bonsang	Won	
2021	Gaon Chart Music Awards	Music Steady Seller of the Year	Won	

Music program awards
Program	Date	Ref.
Inkigayo	December 1, 2019	
Inkigayo	December 8, 2019	
Inkigayo	December 15, 2019	
Music Bank	December 20, 2019	
Music Bank	December 27, 2019	
Show! Music Core	December 21, 2019	

== Chart performance ==
=== Weekly charts ===
Chart (2019–2022)	Peak position
Singapore (RIAS)	14
South Korea (Gaon)	1
South Korea (K-pop Hot 100)	1
South Korea Songs (Billboard)	25
US World Digital Song Sales (Billboard)	10

=== Year-end charts ===
Chart (2019)	Position
South Korea (Gaon)	96

Chart (2020)	Position
South Korea (Gaon)	5

Chart (2021)	Position
South Korea (Gaon)	20

Chart (2022)	Position
South Korea (Circle)	73

Chart (2023)	Position
South Korea (Circle)	173

Chart (2024)	Position
South Korea (Circle)	170

== Certifications ==
Streaming certification for "Blueming"
Region	Certification	Certified units/sales
Streaming
Japan (RIAJ)	Gold	50,000,000^{†}
South Korea (KMCA)	2× Platinum	200,000,000^{†}
^{†} Streaming-only figures based on certification alone.

== Release history ==
Release dates and formats
Region	Date	Format	Label	Ref.
Various	November 18, 2019	Digital download; streaming	Kakao M	
