= Love Poem (EP) =

- Digital cover

EP by IU
- Released: November 18, 2019
- Recorded: 2019
- Genre: K-pop
- Length: 24:58
- Language: Korean
- Label: Kakao M
- Producers: IU; Lee Jong-hoon

IU chronology
| A Flower Bookmark 2 (2017) | Love Poem (2019) | Lilac (2021) |

Singles from Love Poem
- 1. "Love Poem" Released: November 1, 2019; 2. "Blueming" Released: November 18, 2019

Love Poem is the fifth Korean-language extended play (seventh overall) by South Korean singer-songwriter IU. The EP was released on November 18, 2019, through Kakao M. It includes the lead single and title track, "Love Poem", as well as the tracks "Above the Time" and "Blueming", which both received music videos. The EP debuted atop the Gaon Album Chart, selling over 168,000 copies in South Korea in November 2019 and had been certified platinum by the Korean Music Content Association for selling over 250,000 copies.

== Background and release ==
Following the release of A Flower Bookmark 2 in September 2017, IU focused on acting. In October 2018, she released "Bbibbi", to commemorate ten years since her debut. On March 3, 2019, IU announced that she was working on a new album that would release soon. Love Poem was announced on October 11. The EP was originally supposed to be released on November 1, 2019, but was postponed by the singer on October 21, following the suicide of South Korean singer and close friend Sulli in mid-October. The title-track "Love Poem" was released on November 1.

The album also consists of the songs "Blueming" and "Above the Time," which is a sequel to the 2011 hit song, "You & I". The Above the Time music video also served as a reunion between IU and actor Lee Hyun-woo who also starred in the music video of "You & I".

Love Poem was released digitally in various countries by Kakao M on November 18, 2019. A physical version was released two days later in the form of a photo book alongside a CD.

== Critical reception ==
Tamar Herman of Billboard wrote that the "EP as a whole is almost like a Love Poem of sorts to IU's career, with each of the singles representing a different part of her discography", comparing the title track to the "poignant tunes" from IU's own A Flower Bookmark series of EPs; the "vivacious pop-rock tune" "Blueming" to IU's 2015 track "Twenty-Three", and calling the "melodious, theatrical" "Above the Time" "a sonic and visual sequel" to IU's 2011 song "You and I", in terms of both its music and the storyline of its video.

== Commercial performance ==
Love Poem debuted atop the Gaon Album Chart on the 47th issued week (November 17–23). The album was the third best-selling of November, moving nearly 170,000 physical copies. The album had been certified platinum by the Korean Music Content Association for selling over 250,000 copies.

== Track listing ==
All lyrics are written by IU.

| No. | Title | Music | Arrangement | Length |
|---|---|---|---|---|
| 1. | "Unlucky" | Kim Je-hwi | Kim Je-hwi | 3:51 |
| 2. | "The Visitor" (그 사람; Geu saram; lit. That Person) | IU | Jukjae | 3:51 |
| 3. | "Blueming" | IU; Lee Jong-hoon; Lee Chae-kyu | Lee Jong-hoon; Lee Chae-kyu | 3:37 |
| 4. | "Above the Time" (시간의 바깥; Sigan-ui bakkat; lit. Outside of Time) | Lee Min-soo | Lee Min-soo | 5:00 |
| 5. | "Lullaby" (자장가; Jajang-ga) | Kim Hee-won | Hong So-jin | 4:21 |
| 6. | "Love Poem" | Lee Jong-hoon | Hong So-jin; Jukjae | 4:18 |
| Total length: | | | | 25:04 |

== Charts ==
Weekly chart performance for Love Poem
| Chart (2019) | Peak position |
|---|---|
| South Korean Albums (Gaon) | 1 |
| US World Albums (Billboard) | 10 |

Monthly chart performance for Love Poem
| Chart (2019) | Peak position |
|---|---|
| South Korean Albums (Gaon) | 3 |

Year-end chart performance for Love Poem
| Chart (2019) | Peak position |
|---|---|
| South Korean Albums (Gaon) | 28 |

== Sales ==
Sales figures for Love Poem
| Region | Sales |
|---|---|
| South Korea (Gaon) | 250,000 |
