= Modern Times (IU album) =

Studio album by IU
- Released: October 8, 2013
- Recorded: 2013
- Genres: K-pop; bossa nova; electronic; folk; jazz; Latin pop; swing
- Length: 46:44; 53:34 (Repackaged album)
- Language: Korean
- Labels: LOEN Entertainment; LOEN Tree Label

IU chronology
Can You Hear Me? (2013)	Modern Times (2013)	A Flower Bookmark (2014)

Singles from Modern Times
- 1. "The Red Shoes" Released: October 8, 2013

Repackaged album cover

Singles from Modern Times - Epilogue
- 1. "Friday" Released: December 20, 2013

Modern Times is the third studio album by South Korean singer-songwriter IU. It was released on October 8, 2013, via LOEN Entertainment under its imprint LOEN Tree. Under the theme of "French Black", the album departs from the singer's girlish image which established her as the "Nation's Sweetheart", by attempting various styles of music such as swing, jazz, and bossa nova. Her first full-length record since Last Fantasy (2011), the album contains guest features and collaborations from several artists.

Modern Times contains thirteen tracks, including IU's number-one hit "The Red Shoes" and her self-composed song "Bad Day". It also features the Korean version of "Voice Mail" from IU's Japanese EP Can You Hear Me? (2013) as a bonus track. The album was re-released as Modern Times - Epilogue on December 20, 2013, and contained the single "Friday" as well as the track "Pastel Crayon" from KBS's television series Bel Ami where IU starred as a lead role. The repackaged album contained two DVDs and was limited to 10,000 copies.

Modern Times was met with acclaim from music critics, who praised its musical styles and composition and was ranked the second greatest K-pop album of the 2010s by Billboard. It experienced commercial success in South Korea, with its tracks garnering over three million digital downloads in its opening week. The album has sold more than 70,000 physical copies and ten million digital singles, with "Friday" being one of the best-selling singles in the country.

== Composition ==
Musically, the pop and jazz album incorporates a wide range of genres including bossa nova, folk and Latin pop.

== Release ==
The album's title and artwork were revealed on September 17. According to LOEN Entertainment, IU's agency, the singer's third full-length album would be titled Modern Times. It was also announced that her agency would provide an illustrated guide for Modern Times which gives audiences clues about the tracks of the album. From September 23 to October 4, seven video teasers were released for the album through LOEN Entertainment's YouTube channel. The series of teasers introduced some of the tracks from her new album.

Modern Times was released digitally at 12:00 am KST on October 8, 2013. Upon its release, the lead single "The Red Shoes" topped a number of real-time charts in South Korea, achieving an all-kill status, while the rest of the tracks also entered the charts. The album topped the Gaon Albums Chart on the third week of October 2013. The physical album sold 40,360 copies in 2013, making it the 41st best-selling Korean album of that year. As of 2014, Modern Times has sold 58,145 copies in South Korea, with the sales of its repackaged album combined.

== Singles ==
=== "The Red Shoes" ===
"The Red Shoes" (Korean: 분홍신) the album's lead track, is a song with big band sounds, dramatic developments, and elaborate choruses. The song was inspired from the 1845 fairy tale under the same title written by Danish author Hans Christian Andersen, and the movie plot for its music video was adapted from the 1948 British film of the same title. Comparing to red shoes, it tells about a woman who begins her journey for the once-brilliant and summer-like days she had with her lost love, counting on her fate.

The single was released on October 8, 2013, along with the whole album, and its music video was officially unveiled at 11:00 am KST on the same day (although it premiered a day earlier on SBS MTV). The video, directed by Hwang Soo-ah, features cameo appearances from Yoo Hee-yeol (also known as the sole member of one-man project band Toy), electronic duo Peppertones, and models Fhi Fan and Jang Ki-yong. A performance-centered music video for "The Red Shoes" was also released via LOEN's official YouTube channel on October 21.

"The Red Shoes" reached number one on both the Gaon Digital Chart and Download Charts in the third week of October 2013. It also topped the K-pop Hot 100 for two consecutive weeks, becoming the singer's third number-one hit on the chart. "The Red Shoes" received six music program awards throughout October and was the 42nd biggest selling digital song of 2013 in South Korea. It sold 1,359,107 downloads by the end of 2014.

=== "Friday" ===
"Friday" (Korean: 금요일에 만나요; RR: Geumyoil-e Mannayo), is the lead single for the repackaged album Modern Times - Epilogue. The self-composed song is a bossa nova tune with a catchy medium-tempo melody, and sings about delirious excitement of a couple who just had a crush on each other. The singer's labelmate Jang Yi-jeong, a member of boy group History participated as a featured artist (He also starred on its music video, as a guy who has a one-sided love for IU). The single was released on December 20, 2013, and its music video was officially uploaded at 12:00 pm KST on the same day. The one shot music video also reunites IU and model Jang Ki-yong, who she previously starred with for the video "The Red Shoes".

Just like the previous single, "Friday" peaked at number one on both the Gaon Singles and Download Charts. The song also topped the K-pop Hot 100 for two consecutive weeks, becoming the singer's fourth number-one single there. (Note: IU currently has a total of six chart-toppers, with "Not Spring, Love, or Cherry Blossoms" and "My Old Story" (2014) added hereafter (see IU discography).) Without any televised promotions, "Friday" received four music show wins. Although released in 2013, "Friday" was the sixth biggest selling digital song of 2014 in South Korea. As of 2020, it has sold more than 5,000,000 digital downloads in the country, making it one of the best-selling singles in South Korea.

== Promotion ==
On October 7, 2013, prior to the album's release, IU presented her first-ever comeback showcase at K-Art Hall in Olympic Park, Seoul, performing her brand-new songs including "Modern Times", "Between the Lips (50cm)", and "The Red Shoes". She also held a preview of the official music video for the title track. IU began promoting her comeback album on various music programs, starting on the October 10, 2013, broadcast of M! Countdown. Along with the lead single, she promoted "Modern Times", "Between the Lips (50cm)", and "Love of B" on M! Countdown, Music Bank, Show! Music Core, and Inkigayo, and Show Champion.

On KBS's You Hee-yeol's Sketchbook, the singer performed "The Red Shoes", "Bad Day", and "Walk with Me, Girl", alongside a cover of "About Romance" originally sung by Choi Baek-ho (who was featured in "Walk with Me, Girl"). IU performed the lead single also at the 50th annual Grand Bell Awards, in celebration of the event. It was announced that IU would hold her second solo concert entitled "Modern Times" from November 23. Starting at Kyung Hee University's Peace Palace Hall in Seoul, she also performed in Busan at KBS Hall on December 1, to promote the album.

== Reception ==
Professional ratings
Review scores
Source	Rating
IZM	3.5/5 stars

Modern Times received positive reviews from critics. The Korea Herald complimented the album writing: "... vintage sounds and modern effects are put together artfully, forming a fresh but familiar compilation of songs. Modern Times has a distinct carefree feel that is reminiscent of jazz during the Roaring Twenties." Seoul Beats also gave a positive review, explaining "With its jazzy, big band sound, IU provided a breath of fresh air to the K-pop scene... The album’s real strength is how seamlessly the tracks flow together." Billboard gave the album a positive review while praising IU for proving to have "musical sensibilities well beyond a typical 20-year-old". Commercially, the album has sold more than 61,900 copies in South Korea as of October 2015 (Note: Sales for both Modern Times and Modern Times - Epilogue are combined.) and 3,300 copies in Japan.

Modern Times on critic lists
Publication	Year	List	Rank	Ref.
Billboard	2019	The 25 Greatest K-Pop Albums of the 2010s	2	

== Accolades ==
Awards and nominations
Year	Award	Category	Recipient	Result	Ref.
2013	Gaon Chart K-Pop Awards	Song of the Year – October	"The Red Shoes"	Won	
2013	Mnet Asian Music Awards	Best Vocal Performance – Female	"The Red Shoes"	Nominated	
2014	Golden Disc Awards	Grand Prize in Album Releasing	Modern Times	Nominated	
2014	Melon Music Awards	Song of the Year	"Friday"	Nominated	
2014	Melon Music Awards	Best Ballad Award	"Friday"	Nominated	
2014	Mnet Asian Music Awards	Song of the Year	"Friday"	Nominated	
2014	Mnet Asian Music Awards	Best Vocal Performance – Female	"Friday"	Nominated	

Music program awards
Song	Program	Date	Ref.
"The Red Shoes"	Show Champion	October 16, 2013	
"The Red Shoes"	M Countdown	October 17, 2013	
"The Red Shoes"	M Countdown	October 24, 2013	
"The Red Shoes"	Music Bank	October 18, 2013	
"The Red Shoes"	Show! Music Core	October 19, 2013	
"The Red Shoes"	Inkigayo	October 20, 2013	
"Friday"	Inkigayo	December 29, 2013	
"Friday"	Inkigayo	January 5, 2014	
"Friday"	Music Bank	January 3, 2014	
"Friday"	Show! Music Core	January 4, 2014	

== Track listing ==
Modern Times – Standard and limited edition
No.	Title	Lyrics	Music	Arrangement	Length
1.	"Love of B" (을의 연애; Eurui Yeonae, with Park Ju-won)	IU	Park Ju-won	Park Ju-won	3:11
2.	"Everybody Has Secrets" (누구나 비밀은 있다; Nuguna Bimireun Itda, featuring Gain of Brown Eyed Girls)	Kim Eana	Yoon Sang, East4A	Yoon Sang, East4A	3:49
3.	"Between the Lips (50cm)" (입술 사이; Ipsul Sai)	G. Gorilla	G. Gorilla	G. Gorilla	2:50
4.	"The Red Shoes" (분홍신; Bunhongsin)	Kim Eana	Lee Min-soo	Lee Min-soo, Toyama Kazuhiko	4:14
5.	"Modern Times"	Kim Eana	Jeong Seok-won	Jeong Seok-won	3:25
6.	"Bad Day" (싫은 날; Sireun Nal)	IU	IU	G. Gorilla	3:52
7.	"Obliviate"	G. Gorilla, Kim Eana	G. Gorilla	G. Gorilla	3:10
8.	"Walk with Me, Girl" (아이야, 나랑 걷자; Aiya, Narang Geotja, featuring Choi Baek-ho)	Kim Eana	Park Ju-won	Park Ju-won	5:00
9.	"Havana"	Kim Eana	Jeon Jung-hoon	Jeon Jung-hoon	4:09
10.	"A Gloomy Clock" (우울시계; Uulsigye, featuring Jonghyun of Shinee)	Kim Jong-hyun	Kim Jong-hyun	Oh Jun-hyuk	2:48
11.	"Daydream" (한낮의 꿈; Hannajui Kkum, featuring Yang Hee-eun)	PJ, Choi Gap-won	PJ, Choi Gap-won	PJ, Shin Seung-ik	3:40
12.	"Wait" (기다려; Gidaryeo)	IU	TEXU	TEXU	2:30
13.	"Voice Mail (Korean version)" (Bonus track)	IU	IU	G. Gorilla	4:06
Total length:					46:44

Modern Times: Epilogue – Repackage
No.	Title	Lyrics	Music	Arrangement	Length
1.	"Friday" (금요일에 만나요; Geumyoil-e Mannayo, featuring Jang Yi-jeong of History)	IU	IU	Lee Jong-min	3:37
2.	"Pastel Crayon" (크레파스; Keurepaseu, from Bel Ami)	IU	KZ, Junjaman	KZ, Junjaman	3:13
3.	"Love of B" (을의 연애; Eurui Yeonae, with Park Ju-won)	IU	Park Ju-won	Park Ju-won	3:11
4.	"Everybody Has Secrets" (누구나 비밀은 있다; Nuguna Bimireun Itda, featuring Gain of Brown Eyed Girls)	Kim Eana	Yoon Sang, East4A	Yoon Sang, East4A	3:49
5.	"Between the Lips (50cm)" (입술 사이; Ipsul Sai)	G. Gorilla	G. Gorilla	G. Gorilla	2:50
6.	"The Red Shoes" (분홍신; Bunhongsin)	Kim Eana	Lee Min-soo	Lee Min-soo, Toyama Kazuhiko	4:14
7.	"Modern Times"	Kim Eana	Jeong Seok-won	Jeong Seok-won	3:25
8.	"Bad Day" (싫은 날; Sireun Nal)	IU	IU	G. Gorilla	3:52
9.	"Obliviate"	G. Gorilla, Kim Eana	G. Gorilla	G. Gorilla	3:10
10.	"Walk with Me, Girl" (아이야, 나랑 걷자; Aiya, Narang Geotja, featuring Choi Baek-ho)	Kim Eana	Park Ju-won	Park Ju-won	5:00
11.	"Havana"	Kim Eana	Jeon Jung-hoon	Jeon Jung-hoon	4:09
12.	"A Gloomy Clock" (우울시계; Uulsigye, featuring Jonghyun of Shinee)	Kim Jong-hyun	Kim Jong-hyun	Oh Jun-hyuk	2:48
13.	"Daydream" (한낮의 꿈; Hannajui Kkum, featuring Yang Hee-eun)	PJ, Choi Gap-won	PJ, Choi Gap-won	PJ, Shin Seung-ik	3:40
14.	"Wait" (기다려; Gidaryeo)	IU	TEXU	TEXU	2:30
15.	"Voice Mail (Korean version)" (Bonus track)	IU	IU	G. Gorilla	4:06
Total length:					53:34

== Chart performance ==
=== Weekly charts ===
Chart (2013)	Peak position
South Korean Albums (Gaon)	1
Japanese Albums (Oricon)	69
US World Albums (Billboard)	4

=== Monthly charts ===
Chart (2013)	Peak position
South Korean Albums (Gaon)	3

=== Year-end charts ===
Chart (2013)	Position
South Korean Albums (Gaon)	45

== Sales ==
Sales for Modern Times
Region	Sales amount
Japan	3,323
South Korea	73,351
South Korea (repackage)	10,000

== Release history ==
Release history and formats for Modern Times
Region	Date	Format	Edition	Label	Ref.
Various	October 8, 2013	Digital download		LOEN Tree	
South Korea	October 8, 2013	CD	Standard edition	LOEN Tree	
Hong Kong	October 9, 2013	CD	Standard edition	Present Media	
Japan	October 9, 2013	CD, CD+DVD	Standard edition, limited edition	LOEN Tree	
South Korea	October 10, 2013	CD+DVD	Limited edition	LOEN Tree	
Hong Kong	October 11, 2013	CD+DVD	Limited edition	Present Media	
Various	December 20, 2013 (Repackage)	Digital download	Limited edition	LOEN Tree	
South Korea	December 20, 2013 (Repackage)	CD+DVD	Limited edition	LOEN Tree	

== See also ==
- List of K-pop on the Billboard charts
- List of K-pop Hot 100 number ones
- List of number-one albums of 2013 (South Korea)
- List of number-one hits of 2013 (South Korea)
