= Can You Hear Me? (EP) =

EP by IU
- Released: March 20, 2013
- Recorded: 2012–13
- Studios: DCH Studio, Tokyo; LOEN Studio, Seoul; Flyte Tyme Studios, Santa Monica; Middle Chorus Studio, Beijing; Jackson's Lyric Studio, Birmingham, AL
- Genres: R&B; pop; show tune
- Length: 19:36
- Languages: Japanese, English
- Label: East World
- Producers: Hidenobu Okira; Jo Yeong-Cheol; Jeong Seong-Kean

IU chronology
| Spring of a Twenty Year Old (2012) | Can You Hear Me? (2013) | Modern Times (2013) |

Singles from Can You Hear Me?
- 1. "Beautiful Dancer" Released: March 20, 2013

Can You Hear Me? is the second Japanese extended play by South Korean singer-songwriter IU. It was released on March 20, 2013.

== Background and development ==
IU made her Japanese debut under EMI Music Japan in March 2012, with the single "Good Day." Since then, she had been active in both South Korea and Japan. In South Korea, she released the extended play Spring of a Twenty Year Old and collaborated with Korean girl group Fiestar for the song "Sea of Moonlight." In July, she released a Japanese version of her 2011 single "You & I," and held her first Japanese concert, IU Friendship Special Concert: Autumn2012, on September 17, 2012. In October 2012, IU released two cover songs digitally, "Friend" by Japanese rock band Anzen Chitai and "Aishiteru" (愛してる; "I Love You") by Callin', one of the ending theme songs for the anime Natsume's Book of Friends. Both of these were recorded at her first Japanese concert.

In support of the French musical, Notre-Dame de Paris performed at the Tokyu Theatre Orb in Shibuya in February and March, IU covered a song from the English version of the musical, "The Age of the Cathedrals." This was released as a cellphone download on February 6, 2013, and later as a PC download on February 13. This rendition was added to Can You Hear Me? as a bonus track.

The album was officially announced on January 25, 2013.

== Writing and production ==
The album was mostly recorded at DCH Studio, Tokyo, and Loen Studio in Seoul. Additional instrumental recording was recorded at Flyte Tyme Studios in Santa Monica, California and Jackson's Lyric Studio in Birmingham, Alabama. An orchestral sequence in the song "Beautiful Dancer" was performed by the China National Symphony Orchestra, which was recorded at Middle Chorus Studio in Beijing.

The extended play features IU's first original Japanese songs. American R&B production team Jimmy Jam and Terry Lewis were enlisted to write two songs for the project, "Beautiful Dancer" and "Truth." "Beautiful Dancer" was the first time for IU to sing an R&B song. Hiro of the Japanese hip-hop unit LGYankees also served as a vocal producer for the album, and wrote lyrics to three songs on the album.

The song "Voice-mail" was written and composed by IU, then translated into Japanese. This is the fourth self-penned song by IU, after "Take My Hand" from The Greatest Love soundtrack (2011), "A Stray Puppy" from Last Fantasy (2011) and "Peach" (2012). IU composed the song on her acoustic guitar, and completed it in two to three hours.

The Korean version of the song was later put onto IU's third Korean-language studio album Modern Times as a bonus track.

== Promotion and release ==
"Beautiful Dancer" was chosen as the leading promoted track from the extended play and released to radio. It was used as the March ending theme song for the Nippon TV music show Happy Music. The music video was released on March 8, 2013, and was shot over two days in Thailand. A week after the album on March 27, 2013, IU held her first fan meeting event, IU: The First Fan Meeting in Japan at the Tokyo International Forum. IU was featured in magazines to promote the album, was as Haruhana, CanCam, Soup, Rolling Stone Japan and Mini.

"The Age of the Cathedrals" and "New World" were released as promotional singles as album previews in Japan digital outlet, which were released digitally on February 6, 2013 and February 20, 2013.

== Chart reception ==
The album debuted at number 23 on Oricon's albums chart, selling 6,000 copies. After charting for three weeks in the top 300 albums, the extended play sold a total of 8,000 copies. This was less than her previous Japanese extended play, I□U, a compilation album of Korean songs released before her debut in 2011, and significantly less than her two Japanese singles, "Good Day" and "You & I," which were both top 10 releases.

"New World" reached a peak of 76 on the Billboard Japan Hot 100, and the lead single "Beautiful Dancer" reached number 66.

== Track listing ==
| No. | Title | Lyrics | Music | Length |
|---|---|---|---|---|
| 1. | "Beautiful Dancer" | Hiro | James Harris III, Terry Lewis, John Jackson | 4:29 |
| 2. | "Truth" | Hiro | James Harris III, Terry Lewis, John Jackson | 3:37 |
| 3. | "Fairytale" | Hiro | Andy Love, Niclas Kings | 3:38 |
| 4. | "Voice-mail" | IU, Yadako (Japanese translation) | IU | 4:06 |
| 5. | "New World" | Yadako | Ali Thomson, Christoffer Wikberg, Alina Devecerski | 3:49 |
| Total length: | | | | 19:36 |

CD+DVD edition bonus track
| No. | Title | Lyrics | Music | Length |
|---|---|---|---|---|
| 6. | "The Age of the Cathedrals" | Luc Plamondon, Will Jennings (English translation) | Riccardo Cocciante | 3:06 |
| Total length: | | | | 22:47 |

DVD
| No. | Title | Length |
|---|---|---|
| 1. | "A Documentary Film of IU 2012～2013" | 29:52 |

== Chart rankings ==
| Charts (2013) | Peak position |
|---|---|
| Japan Oricon daily albums | 9 |
| Japan Oricon weekly albums | 23 |
| Taiwan G-Music J-pop/K-pop chart | 10 |

=== Sales and certifications ===
| Chart | Amount |
|---|---|
| Oricon physical sales | 8,000 |

== Personnel ==
Personnel details were sourced from Can You Hear Me?'s liner notes booklet.

Managerial

- Soo-Hyun An – marketing for Loen
- Jong-Han Bae – artist management for Loen
- Chan Nam-Kung – management director for Loen
- Young-Chul Cho – production
- Seung-Min Choi – assistant management for Loen
- Tom Coyne – mastering
- Sung-Wook Chung – performance director for Loen
- Yuki Funakoshi – contractor, sound coordination (Digz, Inc.), production direction (#3, #5)
- Hyun-Jin Jang – marketing director for Loen
- Han-Teo Jeong – assistant management for Loen
- Hee-Yeon Jeong – marketing for Loen
- Seong-Kwan Jeong – co-production, planning director for Loen
- Choon-Ho Jo – artist management for Loen
- Gae-Won Jo – assistant management for Loen
- Woo-Kyung Jung – assistant management for Loen
- Shuzo Kamide – marketing for EMI
- Chang-Soo Kim – A&R
- Hyo-Shin Kim – planning for Loen
- Jin-Myoung Kim – A&R director
- Jung-Min Kim – A&R
- Sung-Kyung Kim – marketing for Loen
- Young-Seok Kim – executive supervisor for Loen
- Kazuhiko Koike – executive producer for EMI
- Yoshiaki Kudo – contractor, sound coordination (Digz, Inc.)
- Dong-Jin Kwon – performance arrangement for Loen
- Chang-Hee Lee – assistant management for Loen
- Jung-Min Lee – administration support for Loen
- Sung-Woo Lee – A&R
- Young-Soo Lim – executive supervisor for Loen
- Michael T. Martin – contractor, sound coordination (UnderCover Inc.)
- Shinya Nagai – management for EMI
- Hidenobu Okira – A&R director, production
- Junh-Hyun Park – assistant management for Loen
- Si-Won Park – marketing for Loen
- Yo-Han Park – performance arrangement for Loen
- Yonh-Hoon Seo – A&R
- Ryoichi Shimizu – sales promotion for EMI
- Won-Soo Shin – executive producer for Loen
- Yasuhiro Takeuchi – sales promotion for EMI
- Naoshi Yamaguchi – management for EMI
- Yoshifumi Yamaminami – sales promotion for EMI
- Kwonsang Yang – management for EMI, Port One
- Sang-Jae Yoo – marketing for Loen
- Dong-Hwan Youn – performance arrangement for Loen
- Won-Kyu Yun – A&R

Performance credits

- China National Symphony Orchestra – orchestra (#1)
- IU – vocals
- John Jackson – all instruments (#2)
- Jimmy Jam – all instruments (#1)
- Jong-Min Lee – guitar (#4)
- Soon-Yong Lee – bass (#4)
- Mitsu.J – all instruments (#6)
- Ali Thomson – all instruments (#5)
- Christoffer Wikberg – all instruments (#5)

Visuals and imagery

- Hiroshi Kitta – design
- Misato Kowaki – stylist, visuals producer
- Shin-Ae Lee – make-up
- Joo-Hee No – stylist assistant
- Tomoya Takano – photography
- Shinnosuke Yamada – hair and make-up supervisor
- Yoon-Seo – hair

Technical and production

- Richard Brown – assisting (#1)
- G-Gorilla – arrangement (#4)
- Gregory Germain – mixing (#6), vocal recording (#1—3, #5)
- IU – arrangement (#4)
- Masashi Hashimono – orchestra recording (#1)
- Hiro for Digz, inc. – vocal production (#1—3)
- Huang Li Jie – concert master (#1)
- Seuah Hwang – "Beautiful Dancer" music video director
- Tomoo Ichimura – DVD producer
- John Jackson – co-production (#1), production (#2), recording (#2)
- Jimmy Jam and Terry Lewis – production (#1—2), recording (#1)
- Matt Marrin – mixing (#1—2)
- Atsushi Matsui – DVD recording, mixing
- Mitsu.J – arrangement (#6)
- Masaru Nishiyama – conductor, orchestra arrangement (#1)
- Brian Paturalski – mixing (#3)
- Q-TEC – DVD authoring
- Andros Rodriguez – mixing (#5)
- Myung-Kab Son – mixing (#4), recording (#4, #6)
- Tak – DVD director
- Atsushi Takahata – DVD producer
- Ali Thomson – production (#5)
- Christoffer Wikberg – production (#5)
- Yadako – vocal production (#5)

== Release history ==
| Region | Date | Format | Distributing Label | Catalogue codes |
|---|---|---|---|---|
| Japan | March 20, 2013 | CD, CD+DVD, digital download | EMI Music Japan | TOCT-29128, TOCT-29129 |
| Taiwan | March 22, 2013 | CD+DVD | Golden Typhoon | I5309 |
| Japan | April 6, 2013 | Rental CD+DVD | EMI Music Japan | TOCT-29128 |
