= Shopper (song) =

Single by IU

from the album The Winning
- Language: Korean
- Released: February 20, 2024
- Genre: Electropop; synth-pop
- Length: 3:35
- Label: Edam
- Composers: Lee Jong-hoon; Lee Chae-gyu
- Lyricist: IU
- Producers: Lee Jong-hoon; Lee Chae-gyu

IU singles chronology
"Holssi" (2024)	"Shopper" (2024)	"Never Ending Story" (2025)

Music video
- "Shopper" on YouTube

"Shopper" is a song by South Korean singer-songwriter IU, released as the third single from her extended play (EP), The Winning, on February 20, 2024. It was written by IU, Lee Jong-hoon and Lee Chae-gyu and produced Lee Jong-hoon and Lee Chae-gyu.

== Background ==
"Shopper" was released alongside IU's extended play (EP), The Winning, on February 20, 2024. Written by IU, Lee Jong-hoon and Lee Chae-gyu and produced by Lee Jong-hoon and Lee Chae-gyu, it serves as one of the three singles released in support of the record.

== Composition and lyrics ==
GMA Network noted that the lyrical content of "Shopper" consists of "reaching dreams and desires while living life to the fullest." Rhian Daly of NME characterized the song as a "crisp piece of aspirational synth-pop", with lyrics revolving around the notion of pursuing desires "no matter how impossible they seem."

== Music video ==
A teaser for the music video of "Shopper" was released on February 13, 2024. It features appearances from Korean-Australian musician DPR Ian, who also directed the video. The visual opens with narration from DPR Ian, who explains the presence of an "extraordinary" shop that sells items that contain magic powers.

== Charts ==
=== Weekly charts ===
Weekly chart performance for "Shopper"
Chart (2024)	Peak position
China Korean Songs (TME)	37
Global Excl. U.S (Billboard)	179
Singapore Regional (RIAS)	30
South Korea (Circle)	6
Taiwan (Billboard)	22

=== Monthly charts ===
Monthly chart performance for "Shopper"
Chart (2024)	Position
South Korea (Circle)	22

=== Year-end charts ===
Year-end chart performance for "Shopper"
Chart (2024)	Position
South Korea (Circle)	124

== Release history ==
Release history for "Shopper"
Region	Date	Format	Label	Ref.
Various	February 20, 2024	Digital download; streaming	Edam	
