= The Winning =

- Digital cover

EP by IU
- Released: February 20, 2024
- Length: 18:14
- Language: Korean
- Label: Edam
- Producer: IU

IU chronology
Pieces (2021)	The Winning (2024)	A Flower Bookmark 3 (2025)

Singles from The Winning
- 1. "Love Wins All" Released: January 24, 2024; 2. "Holssi" Released: February 16, 2024; 3. "Shopper" Released: February 20, 2024

The Winning is the ninth extended play by South Korean singer-songwriter IU, released on February 20, 2024, through Edam Entertainment. It is her first release since the EP Pieces in December 2021. The EP was preceded by the single "Love Wins All" on January 24, 2024. The follow-up "Holssi" was released on February 16, while "Shopper" was released alongside the EP on February 20, 2024.

== Background ==
After the release of Lilac, IU began working on her next album. In February 2023, she said that the album would be about the feeling of wandering, but later in September she stated that the direction of the project had significantly changed and that the album's main theme would be desire.

IU appeared on BTS member Suga's talk show Suchwita in December 2023, where she hinted that her then-upcoming EP would contain songs about her age.

== Promotion ==
The lead single "Love Wins All" was issued on January 24, 2024, along with its music video. IU officially announced the EP on January 29, 2024, posting a 21-second teaser clip containing close-ups of the singer "accompanied by sombre music", showing her with bleached blonde hair and wearing a red outfit. She is also shown spraying a red-colored spray at the camera before appearing in front of a green background. The track listing of The Winning was revealed on February 5, confirming "Shopper" and "Holssi" as the EP's second and third singles, and guest appearances from NewJeans' Hyein, Wonsun Joe, and an undisclosed narrator on the third track "Shh..".

== Reception ==
The Winning ratings
Review scores
Source	Rating
NME	4/5 stars

NME's Rhian Daily wrote that, "Minor stylistic faults aside – and with a gigantic year ahead for one of Korea's foremost talents – on her first document of a new decade, IU soars high and free and stays winning.

=== Accolades ===
Name of publisher, year listed, name of listicle, and placement
Publisher	Year	Listicle	Placement	Ref.
Billboard	2024	The 20 Best K-Pop Albums of 2024 (So Far): Staff Picks	2nd	

== Track listing ==
All lyrics are written by IU.

The Winning track listing
No.	Title	Music	Arrangement	Length
1.	"Shopper"	Lee Jong-hoon; Lee Chae-gyu	Lee J.; Lee C.	3:35
2.	"Holssi" (홀씨)	Lee J.; Lee C.; IU	Lee J.; Lee C.	3:10
3.	"Shh.." (featuring Hyein and Wonsun Joe; narration by Patti Kim)	Lee J.; Lee C.	Lee J.; Lee C.; Hong So-jin	3:46
4.	"Love Wins All"	Seo Dong-hwan	Seo	4:31
5.	"I Stan U" (관객이 될게)	Jehwi; Kim Hee-won	Jehwi	3:12
Total length:				18:14

== Charts ==
=== Weekly charts ===
Weekly chart performance for The Winning
Chart (2024)	Peak position
Japanese Albums (Oricon)	28
Japanese Combined Albums (Oricon)	40
Japanese Hot Albums (Billboard Japan)	29
Nigerian Albums (TurnTable)	57
South Korean Albums (Circle)	3

=== Monthly charts ===
Monthly chart performance for The Winning
Chart (2024)	Position
South Korean Albums (Circle)	4

=== Year-end charts ===
Year-end chart performance for The Winning
Chart (2024)	Position
South Korean Albums (Circle)	63

== Certifications ==
Certifications for The Winning
Region	Certification	Certified units/sales
South Korea (KMCA)	Platinum	250,000^{^}
^{^} Shipments figures based on certification alone.
