= Love Wins All =

Single by IU

from the EP The Winning
- Language: Korean
- Released: January 24, 2024
- Genre: K-pop
- Length: 4:31
- Label: Edam
- Composer: Seo Dong-hwan
- Lyricist: IU

IU singles chronology
"People Pt. 2" (2023)	"Love Wins All" (2024)	"Holssi" (2024)

Music video
- "Love Wins All" on YouTube

"Love Wins All" is a song by South Korean singer-songwriter IU, released on January 24, 2024, through Edam Entertainment as the lead single from her sixth Korean EP The Winning. It was written by IU and composed by Seo Dong-hwan, and is her first single as a lead artist since "Winter Sleep", released in December 2021. The music video, starring IU alongside BTS member V, was released on the same date. The song achieved a perfect all-kill on the South Korean charts and debuted atop the Circle Digital Chart.

== Background ==
The song's title was initially announced as "Love Wins" on January 15, 2024, before being changed by IU's label Edam to "Love Wins All" before release due to criticism that the title was already in use as a slogan to commemorate the United States legalizing same-sex marriage in 2015.

== Music video ==
The music video was released in conjunction with the song on January 24, 2024, and was directed by Um Tae-hwa. It stars IU and BTS member V as a married couple in a post-apocalyptic world, trying to survive as they recall memories from happier times. IU explained that she first sent V the music, which he enjoyed, and as she had been in contact with him and was also looking for somebody to cast opposite her, asked him to star in the video after realizing he might suit the role.

The video was criticized online for its depiction of disabilities, as IU is shown as having a hearing impairment and V as having a visual impairment. The pair find a camcorder through which they are able to view the other without their respective disabilities, which was considered to be "discriminatory" as it implies disabled people "admire and fantasize" about not having their disabilities.

== Critical reception ==
NME's Rhian Daly scored "Love Wins All" four out of five stars, praising it as a "masterclass of a ballad" that is "delivered over a whisper of a piano melody and soft, unobtrusive strings". The track was included in the publication's mid-year and year-end lists of the best K-pop songs in 2024, ranking at number 17 on the latter list. Paste ranked the song at number seven on its list of the 20 best K-pop songs of 2024, favorably commenting on IU's "emotive vocals".

== Commercial performance ==
In addition to achieving a perfect all-kill on the South Korean charts, it debuted atop the Circle Digital Chart. The song reached number 25 on the Billboard Global 200, number three on the US World Digital Song Sales chart, and number 80 on the Japan Hot 100.

== Accolades ==
On South Korean music programs, "Love Wins All" won eight first place awards and achieved a triple crown on Inkigayo.

Music program awards
Program	Date	Ref.
Inkigayo	February 4, 2024	
Inkigayo	February 18, 2024	
Inkigayo	February 25, 2024	
M Countdown	February 1, 2024	
Music Bank	February 9, 2024	
Show! Music Core	February 3, 2024	
Show! Music Core	February 17, 2024	
Show! Music Core	February 24, 2024	

== Charts ==
=== Weekly charts ===
Weekly chart performance
Chart (2024)	Peak position
Global 200 (Billboard)	25
Hong Kong (Billboard)	10
Indonesia (Billboard)	23
Japan Hot 100 (Billboard)	80
Japan Digital Singles (Oricon)	29
Malaysia (Billboard)	6
New Zealand Hot Singles (RMNZ)	29
Singapore (RIAS)	11
South Korea (Circle)	1
Taiwan (Billboard)	6
UK Album Downloads (Official Charts)	93
US World Digital Song Sales (Billboard)	3

=== Monthly charts ===
Monthly chart performance
Chart (2024)	Position
South Korea (Circle)	1

=== Year-end charts ===
Year-end chart performance
Chart	Year	Position
South Korea (Circle)	2024	5
South Korea (Circle)	2025	41

== Certifications ==
Streaming certifications for "Love Wins All"
Region	Certification	Certified units/sales
South Korea (KMCA)	Platinum	100,000,000^{†}
^{†} Streaming-only figures based on certification alone.
