= Chat-Shire =

EP by IU
- Released: October 23, 2015
- Genre: K-pop
- Length: 25:40 (digital); 31:56 (CD)
- Language: Korean
- Labels: LOEN Entertainment; LOEN Tree Label
- Producer: IU

IU chronology
A Flower Bookmark (2014)	Chat-Shire (2015)	Palette (2017)

Singles from Chat-Shire
- 1. "Twenty-Three" Released: October 23, 2015

Music video
- "Twenty-Three" on YouTube

Chat-Shire (stylized as CHAT-SHIRE) is the fifth Korean-language extended play by South Korean singer-songwriter IU. The self-composed EP was released digitally on October 23, 2015, and physically four days later by LOEN Entertainment under its imprint LOEN Tree. It was her first original material release since Modern Times (2013).

Chat-Shire contains seven tracks in total including the lead single "Twenty-Three". It also features two CD-only bonus tracks ("Heart" and "Twenty Three") from KBS's television series The Producers, in which IU starred as Cindy.

== Composition ==
According to Scott Interrante of PopMatters, Chat-Shire uses lush orchestrations and complex arrangements that recreates a 90's chamber pop sound similar to The Cardigans. The song "Red Queen" was inspired by a drawing created by Sulli.

== Reception ==
=== Commercial reception ===
The lead single, "Twenty-Three" (Korean: 스물셋), topped the national music charts upon release with several of the album's tracks also ranking in the top ten. The track eventually achieved a Perfect All-Kill, as the single hit Number 1 on all of the major South Korean music sites simultaneously. The album reached a peak position of number two on Gaon Album Chart and also reached number four on Billboard's World Albums chart.

=== Critical reception ===
Professional ratings
Review scores
Source	Rating
IZM	3.5/5 stars

Billboard listed the album at number six on its list of "Top 10 Best K-Pop Albums of 2015" and described the album as a "must-hear" release, containing "some of [IU's] most personal music yet", and named "The Shower" (Korean: 푸르던) as its stand-out track. Seoul Beats also highlighted the "personal quality" showcased in many of the album's tracks and praised IU's "growing maturity as an artist" and her willingness to experiment musically.

== Controversy ==
Following its release, the album was criticized for sampling Britney Spears' 2007 song "Gimme More" without permission in the bonus track "23". Although IU did not compose the music for the song, she issued an apology for not checking the samples' sources as the album's producer.

The lyrics for "Zezé" and its illustration on the album cover were criticized by the Korean publisher of the novel My Sweet Orange Tree for its reinterpretation of its five-year-old protagonist, Zezé. Amidst growing debate in the music community, the book's publisher later apologized for its failure to acknowledge the "diversity of interpretation". The controversy surrounding "Zezé" attracted international attention with AbeBooks reporting My Sweet Orange Tree as the most searched for book on its site on November 5–6, despite the book being out of print in English for years. Meanwhile, South Korea's largest book store chain, Kyobo Book Centre, reported that sales of the book has increased 5.7 times over the period of November 5–8 when compared to sales over the November 1–4 period.

== Track listing ==
All lyrics are written by IU.

Chat-Shire – digital download
No.	Title	Music	Arrangement	Length
1.	"Shoes" (새 신발; Sae Sinbal)	Lee Jong-hoon	Lee Jong-hoon	3:35
2.	"Zezé"	Lee Jong-hoon, Lee Chae-kyu	Lee Jong-hoon, Lee Chae-kyu	3:11
3.	"Twenty-Three" (스물셋; Seumulset)	Lee Jong-hoon, Lee Chae-kyu, IU	Lee Jong-hoon, Lee Chae-kyu	3:14
4.	"The Shower" (푸르던; Pureudeon)	IU	Kim Je-hwi	4:07
5.	"Red Queen" (featuring Zion.T)	Lee Jong-hoon, Lee Chae-kyu	Lee Jong-hoon, Lee Chae-kyu	3:33
6.	"Knees" (무릎; Mureup)	IU	Lee Jong-hoon	4:43
7.	"Glasses" (안경; An-gyeong)	IU	Kim Je-hwi	3:17
Total length:				25:40

Chat-Shire – physical edition (bonus tracks)
No.	Title	Music	Arrangement	Length
8.	"Heart" (마음; Maeum, from The Producers)	IU, Kim Je-hwi	IU, Kim Je-hwi	2:47
9.	"Twenty Three" (from The Producers)	PJ, Lee Jong-hoon	PJ, Lee Jong-hoon	3:29
Total length:				31:56

Notes

- The title of track 1 literally means "New Shoes".
- The title of track 4 literally means "Once Blue".
- The title of track 7 literally means "Eyeglasses".

== Charts ==
Chart (2015)	Peak position	Sales
South Korean Gaon Weekly Albums Chart	2	KOR: 96,587
South Korean Gaon Monthly Albums Chart	9	KOR: 96,587
South Korean Gaon Year-End Albums Chart	56	KOR: 96,587
US Billboard Heatseekers Albums Chart	19	KOR: 96,587
US Billboard World Albums Chart	4	KOR: 96,587

== Release history ==
Region	Date	Format	Label
South Korea	October 23, 2015	Digital download	LOEN Tree
Various	October 23, 2015	Digital download	LOEN Tree
South Korea	October 27, 2015	CD	LOEN Tree
