= Twenty-Three (song) =

Song by IU

Single by IU

from the album Chat-Shire
- Released: October 23, 2015
- Genre: Dance
- Length: 3:14
- Label: Loen Entertainment
- Songwriter: IU

IU singles chronology
"Leon" (2015)	"Twenty-Three" (2015)	"Choice" (2016)

Music video
- "Twenty-Three" on YouTube

"Twenty-Three" (Korean: 스물셋; RR: Seumulset) is a song recorded by South Korean singer-songwriter IU for the fifth extended play Chat-Shire. IU herself penned the lyrics of the song and co-composed it with its producers Lee Jong-hoon and Lee Chae-kyu. The song was released on October 23, 2015, in conjunction with the release of the album as the album's lead single. A dance track, the lyrics document IU's inner thoughts as she walks into her twenties.

"Twenty-Three" received positive reviews from music critics. It was a commercial success topping the Gaon Digital Chart upon release and has since sold over 2.5 million downloads in South Korea. An accompanying music video was released simultaneously with the single release on YouTube.

== Composition ==
"Twenty-Three" is a disco-inspired dance track which marks a departure from folk towards a more electropop sound. The song features a funky bassline and percussive vocals, with the singer's signature vocal flourishes. The track was written and composed by IU, while production was handled by Lee Jong-hoon and Lee Chae-kyu. The song has a length of three minutes and fourteen seconds and is performed in the key of F minor. The tempo runs at 123 beats per minute and is set in a 4/4 time signature.

A satirical coming-of-age track, "Twenty-Three" alludes to the Korean age 23 of the singer. Lyrically, the song feels like a personal declaration of the singer, in which she discusses the contradictions and pressures of becoming an adult woman who is struggling to choose between childhood and adulthood. The lyrics also throws light on the singer's personality by reflecting her inner thoughts and emotions. During the chorus, she talks about her animal-like personas, as indicated in the line, "a fox that pretends to be a bear that pretends to be a fox."

== Critical reception ==
Professional ratings
Review scores
Source	Rating
IZM	2.5/5 stars

"Twenty-Three" received generally positive reviews from music critics praising IU's vocal performance and her skill as a songwriter. The song's personal direction was also praised by critics. Idolator listed "Twenty-Three" at number 12 on its list of "Best K-Pop Songs of 2015". On behalf of the publication, Jacques Peterson explained: "The talented star once again proved that she could seamlessly blend her singer/songwriter leanings with catchy hooks and melodies, cementing herself as this generation’s greatest K-pop princess." Scott Interrante of PopMatters dubbed "Twenty-Three" as " one of the most entertaining songs of 2015," praising the singer's "powerful" and "expressive" vocals and felt that the track brought "her music into a more personal direction than they have before." Jeff Benjamin of Billboard acclaimed the track, hailing it as the singer's most "personal music yet." In another review for the same publication, Benjamin ranked it as one of the stand-out tracks of Chat-Shire.

== Chart performance ==
The song topped the domestic music charts, and eventually achieved a Perfect All-Kill, as the single reached number one on all of the major South Korean music sites simultaneously. Upon its week of release, the song claimed the top spot on the Gaon Digital Chart for the 44th charting week of the year - October 18 to October 24 - despite being released the 23rd of that month. The song performed identically on the component Download chart. The song held its number one position on the Digital chart the following week while climbing to the top of the Streaming chart also. It was the fourth best-performing song on the Gaon Monthly Chart for October 2015, selling 492,954 downloads.

As of February 2019, the song has sold over 2,500,000 copies in South Korea.

== Music video ==
An accompanying music video directed by Lumpens was released alongside the song. The video portrays IU trying out an array of colorful outfits and settings.

== Charts ==
Chart (2015)	Peak position
South Korea (Gaon)	1
US World Digital Song Sales (Billboard)	4

Chart (2015)	Position
South Korea (Gaon)	60

== Sales ==
Chart	Downloads	Streaming
South Korean	2,500,000+ (Note: South Korean sales figures for 'Twenty-Three' as of February 2019.)	100,000,000 (Note: South Korean streaming figures for 'Twenty-Three' as of December 2021.)

== Music program awards ==
Program	Date	Ref.
Inkigayo	November 1, 2015	
Inkigayo	November 8, 2015	
Show! Music Core	November 14, 2015	
