= IU (entertainer) =

South Korean singer-songwriter and actress (born 1993)

- IU in 2026
- Born: Lee Ji-eun; May 16, 1993 (age 33); Seoul, South Korea
- Occupations: Singer-songwriter; actress
- Years active: 2008–present
- Musical career
- Genres: K-pop; R&B; soul
- Instrument: Vocals
- Labels: EDAM (Kakao); Universal Japan; Warner Taiwan

Korean name
- Hangul: 이지은
- RR: I Jieun
- MR: I Chiŭn

Stage name
- Hangul: 아이유
- RR: Aiyu
- MR: Aiyu
- Website: edam-ent.com

Lee Ji-eun (Korean: 이지은; born May 16, 1993), also known by her stage name IU (아이유), is a South Korean singer-songwriter and actress. She signed with LOEN Entertainment (now Kakao Entertainment) in 2007 as a trainee and debuted as a singer at the age of fifteen with the EP Lost and Found (2008). Although her follow-up albums brought mainstream success, it was only after the release of "Good Day", the lead single from her 2010 EP Real, that she achieved national stardom. "Good Day" went on to spend five consecutive weeks at the top of South Korea's Gaon Digital Chart, and in 2019, it was ranked number one on Billboard's "100 Greatest K-Pop Songs of the 2010s" list.

With the success of her 2011 albums, Real+ and Last Fantasy, IU established herself as a formidable force on the music charts of her native country and further cemented her girl next door image as Korea's "little sister". Her musical style matured and evolved with subsequent releases, deviating from mainstream K-pop styles, exploring and mixing various music genres, with IU exerting more creative control over her music, both as lyricist and producer, at the same time consistently retaining her dominance on South Korean music charts. Her 2020 single "Eight" (prod. by Suga) became her first to reach number one on Billboard's World Digital Song Sales chart.

Aside from her music career, IU has ventured into acting and hosting radio and television shows, starting with a supporting role in the hit teen series Dream High (2011). IU's roles in My Mister (2018) and When Life Gives You Tangerines (2025) received critical acclaim, and she earned her first Best Actress in Television nomination at the 55th Baeksang Arts Awards for the former.

IU has released a total of five studio albums and twelve EPs, five of which have reached number one on the Gaon Album Chart, and thirty-one number-one singles, making her the artist with the most number-one songs in South Korea. One of the best-selling solo acts in the group-dominated K-pop industry, IU became the first solo female K-pop act to perform at the Olympic Gymnastics Arena during the Seoul leg of her 2018 dlwlrma concert tour for her 10th anniversary and also the first Korean female artist to hold a solo concert, The Golden Hour, at Seoul Olympic Stadium in Seoul on September 17 and 18, 2022.

Rolling Stone named her the 135th greatest singer of all time in a 2023 ranking. She has been included six times in the top ten of Forbes magazine's annual Korea Power Celebrity list since 2012 and attained a peak ranking of number one in 2025. In 2014, Billboard recognized IU as the all-time leader of its K-pop Hot 100 with the most number-one songs and the artist with the most weeks at the number-one position on the chart. She was named Gallup Korea's Singer of the Year in 2014, 2017 and 2025. In 2024, media outlets such as NME and Billboard referred to IU as the "Queen of K-pop", highlighting her widespread influence and consistent success in the industry. In 2025, Forbes Korea referred to IU as the "Queen of K-pop and K-drama", noting her influence and success in both the music and acting industries.

== Early life ==
IU was born Lee Ji-eun on May 16, 1993, in Songjeong-dong, Seoul, South Korea. According to IU, she was born into the Jeonju Yi clan, the same clan as the former Korean monarchy. At an early age, IU showed interest in pursuing a career in the entertainment industry and began attending acting classes. Following her elementary school years, her family's financial situation deteriorated, and they eventually moved to the nearby Uijeongbu, in Gyeonggi Province. She and her younger brother lived apart from their parents in a studio room with their grandmother and cousin for over one year in conditions of great poverty. IU had little contact with her parents over this period of time, but felt reassured under her grandmother's care.

She attended 20 auditions but failed to succeed in any of them, and was also scammed by fake entertainment companies. She later trained at Good Entertainment with Uee, Yubin, Heo Ga-yoon, and Jun Hyo-seong. After signing with LOEN Entertainment in 2007, she moved to Bangbae, Seoul. Due to her poor living conditions at the time, IU stated that she "loved being at the studio", where she could eat as much as she wanted and had a place to sleep.

Her burgeoning career led to her decreased attendance at school and declining grades, with the exception of Korean literature. After graduating from Dongduk Girls' High School in 2012, IU decided not to pursue post-secondary education in tandem with her singing career.

== Career ==
=== 2008–2009: Career beginnings ===
After training for ten months, IU made her debut in 2008 under her stage name, conceived by LOEN to mean "I and You become one through music". She performed her debut single, "Lost Child" (Korean: 미아), live for the first time on the music program M Countdown on September 18, 2008, making it her debut performance as a professional singer. IU recalled the crowd had hurled insults at her during the performance and initially felt discouraged by it, although she now considers it a beneficial experience. "Lost Child" is the lead single from her debut extended play (EP) Lost and Found, which was released on September 24, 2008. For the album, IU was awarded the "Rookie of the Month" by South Korea's Ministry of Culture, Sports and Tourism in November that same year. However, the album did not do well commercially. During an interview in 2011, IU said, "My first album failed, but I'm grateful for that. If I had become successful as soon as, I made my debut, I wouldn't appreciate my staff members and the popularity that I'm enjoying now".

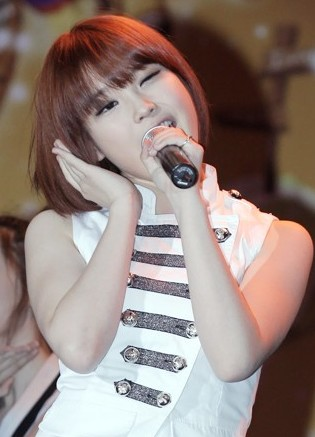
IU performing "Boo" on October 29, 2009

On April 23, 2009, IU launched her first studio album, Growing Up, with the lead promotional single, "Boo". She began her album promotion the next day, performing "Boo" on KBS2's Music Bank. The song was noted for its stark contrast in musical style to "Lost Child", which was described as a "heavy" and "dark" ballad compared to the 1980s "retro sound" of "Boo". Deemed as a "strategic" transformation, the dance choreography, stage costume and hairstyle shown in live performances were used to emphasize her youthfulness and project a "cute" image. Although it drew a favorable response from the public, IU, who was fifteen years old at the time, admitted that the image made her feel awkward. Several songs from Lost and Found were featured on her debut studio album Growing Up, including "You Know" (있잖아); a new rock-style arrangement of the song was released as the follow-up single to "Boo". Towards the end of 2009, IU released her second EP, IU...IM. She began promoting its lead single, "Marshmallow" (마쉬멜로우), on music programs from November 13, 2009. Recalling the performances, IU stated on a 2013 episode of Happy Together that she disliked having to wear the girlish costumes and hairstyle fashioned for the song promotions. The performances were well-received and were once again labelled "cute", reminiscent of reviews for "Boo".

As her popularity began to rise, IU made more frequent appearances on variety shows, performing on Star Golden Bell, Kim Jung-eun's Chocolate, and You Hee-yeol's Sketchbook. Her acoustic covers of other artists' songs such as Girls' Generation's "Gee", Super Junior's "Sorry, Sorry", and BigBang's "Lies" featured in these live performances gained tremendous interest online. In late 2009, she became a television presenter for the first time, hosting a weekly music chart show on Gom TV, while appearing as a fixed guest on multiple radio programs such as Kiss the Radio, Volume Up, MBC Standard FM's Starry Night and MBC FM4U's Best Friend Radio.

=== 2010–2011: Rising popularity and acting debut ===
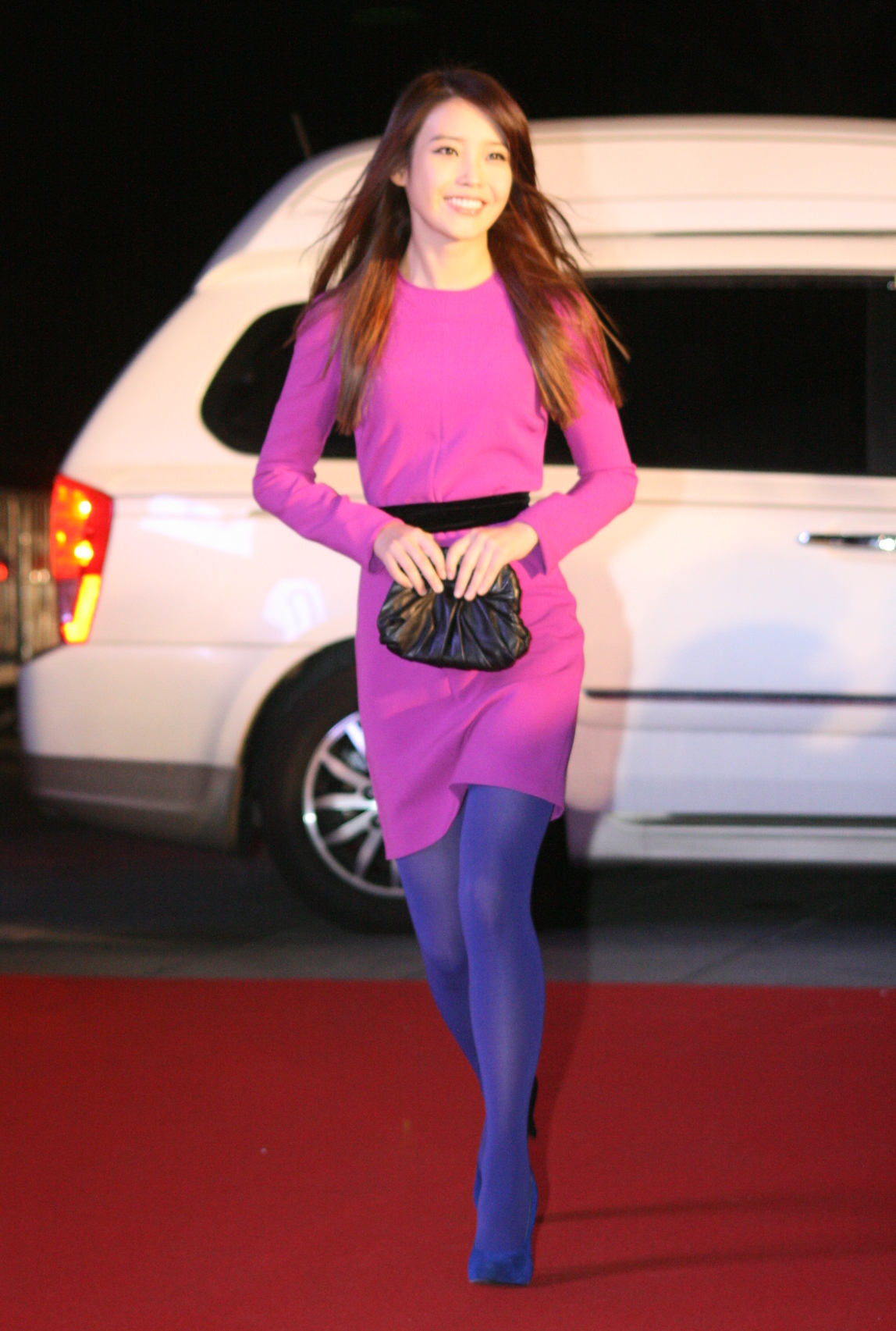
IU at the 2010 Melon Music Awards

On June 3, 2010, IU released "Nagging", a duet with 2AM's Lim Seul-ong. The single debuted at twelve on the Gaon Digital Chart and shot up to the number-one position the following week, where it remained for three weeks. Written by Kim Eana and composed by Lee Min-soo, the pop ballad duet was used as one of the theme songs for the second season of the variety show We Got Married. Soon after, IU released "Because I'm a Woman" (여자라서), one of the theme songs of MBC's historical drama, Road No. 1. The song peaked at number six on the Gaon Digital Chart. IU's collaboration with Sung Si-kyung on "It's You" (그대네요) for his album, The First, debuted at number one on the Gaon Digital Chart. On October 6, 2010, she released the theme song "My Dream Patissiere" for the Korean dub of Yumeiro Patissiere.

"Good Day"
A 21-second sample of "Good Day", the lead single from Real. IU was noted for the "wide range" of her voice, while the song's popularity was ascribed to its lyrics and high-pitched climax.

IU's third EP, Real, was released on December 9, 2010. Produced by Jo, Yeong-cheol and, Choi Gap-won, Real debuted at number four on the Gaon Album Chart. The lead single, "Good Day", reunited IU with lyricist Kim Eana and composer Lee Min-soo after "Nagging", whom she would work with again on the lead singles of her next two studio albums. The uptempo song, as explained by Kim Eana, is about "a shy girl who is nervous about expressing her feelings to the boy she likes". During the album's promotional period, IU also topped the charts on the music programs M Countdown, Music Bank, and Inkigayo. Both Kim Eana and Lee Min-soo considered the main factors of the song's success to be the use of the word oppa (오빠) in the chorus, as well as the three high-pitched notes that IU sings in semitone increments during the climax of the song. In addition to receiving praise for her vocal abilities, IU's fan base also expanded to a more varied demographic as compared to other K-pop groups. Billboard magazine ranked "Good Day" at number one on their list "100 Greatest K-pop Songs of the 2010s".

To maintain public visibility, IU joined the cast of the variety show Heroes, which aired from July 18, 2010, to May 1, 2011. Shortly after, IU was cast in teen drama Dream High. Filming ran from, December 2010 to February 2011, during which time she remained committed to Heroes and her existing promotions for "Good Day". In her first acting role, IU played Kim Pil-sook, a shy and overweight school girl who dreams of becoming a professional singer. Admitting that, she was doubtful about her readiness to take on acting, IU remarked that she gained confidence in learning that the part would require singing and would later describe the experience as a tremendously enjoyable one. For the series' soundtrack, she released the single, "Someday", which achieved number-one position on the Gaon Digital Chart on the week of January 30 – February 5, 2011. By the end of 2011, the single had sold 2,209,924 digital copies and is one of IU's best-selling singles for a soundtrack.

A follow-up extended play to Real, Real+, was released on February 16, 2011, containing three songs. The lead single, "Only I Didn't Know" (나만 몰랐던 이야기), was composed by singer-songwriter Yoon Sang with lyrics written by Kim Eana. Yoon Sang wrote the song for IU after spotting her momentary sad expression on a television broadcast. The ballad's tone was a departure from her more recent releases, with IU describing it as dark, sad and sentimental, which is closer to her music preference. The song performed well commercially, debuting at number one on the Gaon Digital Chart.

IU took on various side-projects after the end of Dream High. On March 10, 2011, IU performed as the opening act for British singer-songwriter Corinne Bailey Rae's first solo concert in Seoul with two songs, before joining Bailey Rae during her performance of "Put Your Records On". In the same month, IU was appointed as one of the new hosts of the music program, Inkigayo, a position which she held until July 2013. In May 2011, IU recorded her first self-composed song, "Hold My Hand" (내 손을 잡아), for the romantic-comedy television series, The Greatest Love. The song peaked at number two on the Gaon Digital Chart and sold 2,031,787 digital copies in 2011. Between May and July 2011, IU took part in the reality ice-skating competition series, Kim Yuna's Kiss & Cry, as a celebrity contestant until she was eliminated in the eighth episode. During this time, she also participated in Immortal Songs: Singing the Legend but eventually withdrew after recording one episode due to her overwhelming schedule.

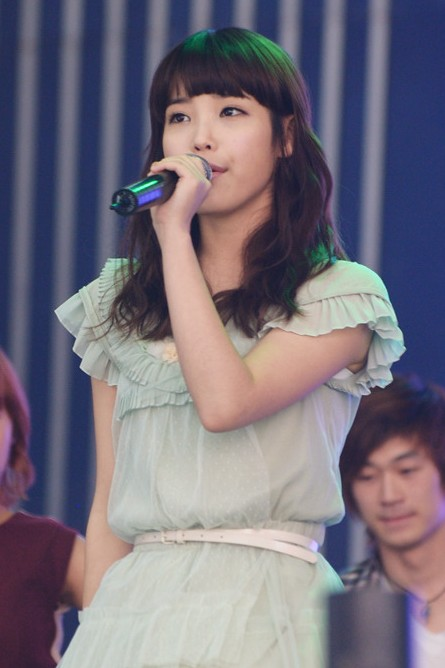
IU performing in 2011

IU's second studio album, Last Fantasy, was released on November 29, 2011. The Korea JoongAng Daily described the album as one that would "suit all kinds of musical tastes and fans", while Billboard noted the "cinematic feel" of the album as set by the opening track, "Secret". Produced by Jo Yeong-cheol, whom IU worked with on Real, the album contains collaborative works with singer-songwriters such as Yoon Sang, Lee Juck and Ra.D. The total number of download sales made from the album's tracks exceeded 10 million within the first two weeks. Eight out of the album's thirteen songs debuted in the top ten on the Gaon Digital Chart, while the album debuted at number one on the Gaon Album Chart. The main single, "You & I", became IU's most commercially successful single with almost 5.5 million digital copies sold by the end of 2012. It topped the Gaon Chart as well as the newly established Billboard K-pop Hot 100 chart at the time of release.

Shortly before the release of Last Fantasy, IU signed with EMI Music Japan (now part of Universal Music Japan) as a precursor to her entry into the Japanese market. A selection of her previously released songs was compiled into an extended play called I□U that was released in Japan on December 14, 2011.

=== 2012: Japanese debut and first solo concert tour ===
As promotions for Last Fantasy and its main single "You & I" continued into 2012 in South Korea, IU began preparations for her debut in Japan by playing two shows at the Bunkamura Orchard Hall in Shibuya, Tokyo to an audience of about 4,000 people on January 24, 2012. Subsequent to the concert, both "Good Day" and "You & I" were released as new singles in Japan with translated lyrics to moderate success. According to, Japan's Oricon Singles Chart, the single album of Good Day sold 21,000 physical copies on the first week of release with the single debuting on the chart at number six. On the Billboard Japan Hot 100, "Good Day" peaked at number 5. "You & I" peaked at number four on the Oricon Singles Chart and number eleven on the Billboard Japan Hot 100. In support of her Japanese single releases, IU toured five cities—Tokyo, Sapporo, Nagoya, Osaka and Fukuoka—in a mini-concert series called IU Friendship Showcase - Spring 2012.

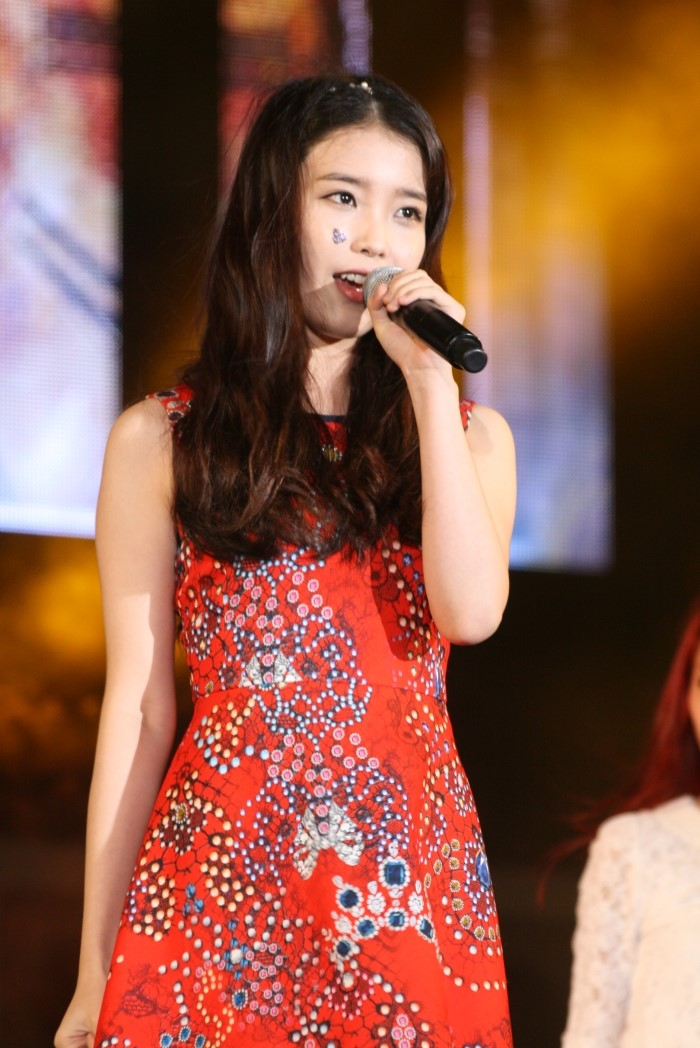
IU performing at Expo Pop Festival on July 3, 2012

IU embarked on her first concert tour, Real Fantasy, in June 2012. She played shows in six different cities across South Korea, starting with two shows in Seoul. The opening shows on June 2–3 were sold out within 30 minutes of the tickets going on sale on April 17. It was reported that 43.8% of ticket purchasers were between the ages of 20 and 29, while 71% were male, which was considered uncommon for a K-pop concert. The tour continued to Ulsan, Jeonju, Suwon, Busan and Daegu, before returning to Seoul with two encore concerts that ended on September 23, 2012. Guest performers included Ra.D, Lim Seul-ong and Lee Seung-gi.

Due to her commitments towards preparing for her first solo tour, IU was unable to make broadcast promotions for her second Korean single album, Spring of a Twenty Year Old, which was released on May 11, 2012. The album, named to celebrate IU turning the Korean age of 20, contains three songs with the lead single being "Peach". Self-composed by IU, "Peach" peaked at number two on the Gaon Digital Chart and number three on the Billboard K-pop Hot 100. The second single released from the album was "Every End of the Day" (하루 끝), which topped the Gaon Digital Chart for two weeks and the Billboard K-pop Hot 100 for four weeks. In place of the usual 4–5 minute music video that usually accompanies a single release, a 26-minute-long documentary-style music film was shot in Venice and Burano and released alongside the album, featuring both "Peach" and "Every End of the Day".

IU returned to Japan on September 17, 2012, to perform one show, titled IU Friendship Special Concert — Autumn 2012, at the Tokyo International Forum to a crowd of over 5,000 people. With Sunny Hill as a guest act, IU performed a mixture of her own songs and covers of Korean and Japanese songs such as "Juliette" by Shinee, "Friend" by Anzen Chitai and "Aishiteru" from the Natsume's Book of Friends anime series. Live recordings of "Friend" and "Aishiteru" from the event were later released as promotional digital singles. Nearing the end of her, Real Fantasy tour and promotions in Japan, IU resumed her hosting duties on Inkigayo after taking a three-month leave due to concert commitments. She also became the host of MBC's short-lived television quiz show, Quiz Show Q, alongside Park Myeong-su and Sun Bom Soo. On December 29, IU hosted the 2012 SBS Gayo Daejeon alongside Bae Suzy and actor Jung Gyu-woon. She was selected by the program's producer for her MC skills that she demonstrated on Inkigayo.

For her accomplishments over the past year, IU won two awards at the 2012 Seoul Music Awards; Last Fantasy was named Record of the Year, while she was among the ten musical acts who were awarded the Main Prize. At the Korean Music Awards, "Good Day" was named Song of the Year and Best Pop Song, while she was named Female Musician of the Year (Netizen Vote). Billboard magazine named IU as one of the hottest musicians under 21 years old in 2012 for her "unique charm and undeniable hits [that] have made her into a bona fide superstar".

=== 2013: First starring roles and Modern Times ===
IU took her first leading role in a television series in 2013, playing the title role in You Are the Best!. Her character was described as a "loser" who is seemingly average in every way except for her daring and bright personality, which helps her to overcome hardships. Despite the worries of casting someone who is better known as a singer in the role, director Yoon Sung-sik decided to cast IU after seeing her performance in Dream High and thought that she suited the image he had envisioned for the character. Her co-stars Go Doo-shim and Lee Ji-hoon, as well as the production crew, praised her performance, especially during emotional scenes. As the series progressed, IU's performance garnered positive critical reviews despite early reservations shown about her casting, with the viewership ratings reaching a peak of 30.8%. She was nominated for the Excellence in Acting Award (Best Actress in a Serial Drama) at the 2013 KBS Drama Awards. For the drama, she released a recording with her co-star Jo Jung-suk of her self-composed duet, "Beautiful Song" (예쁘다송), which was not included on the official soundtrack.

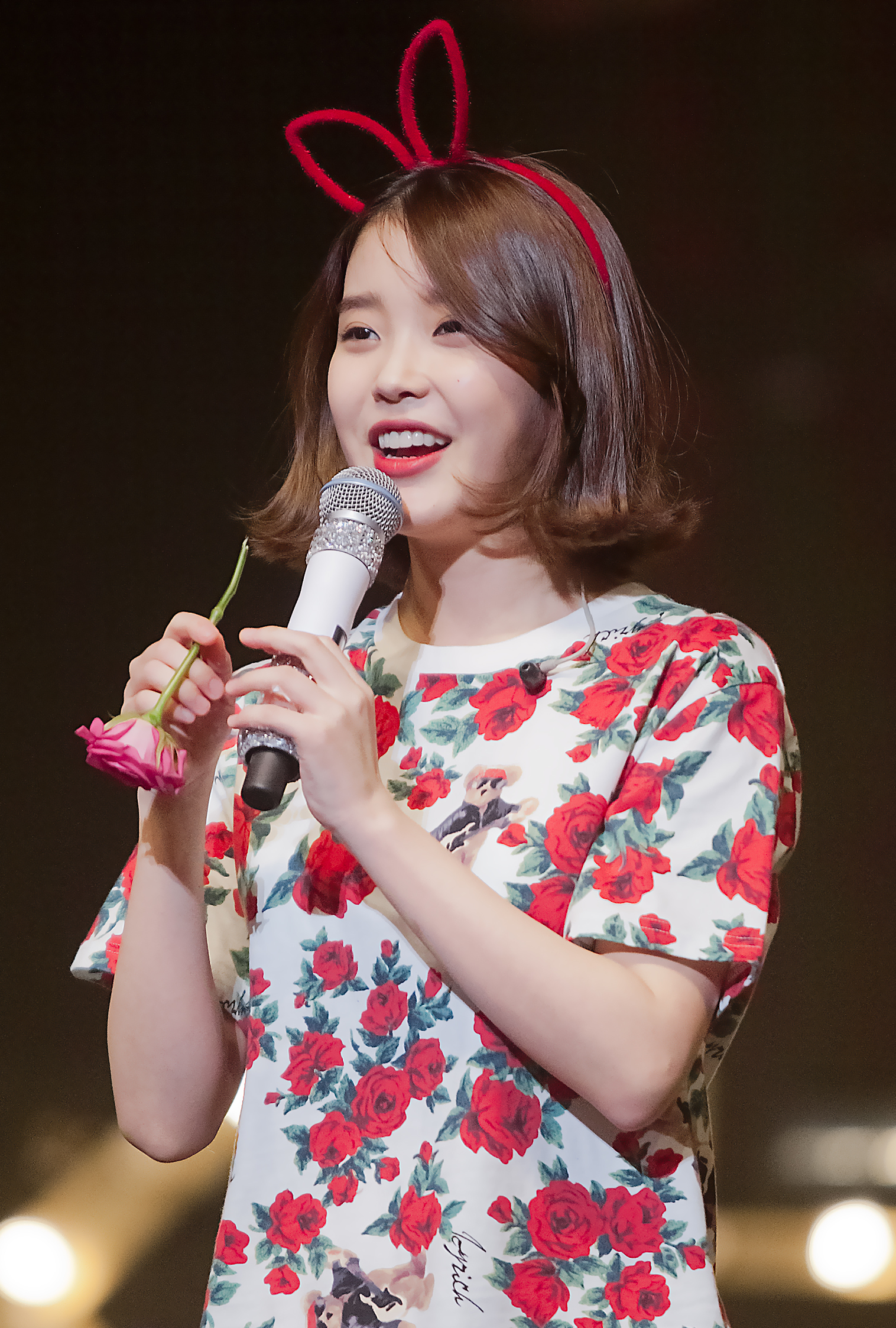
IU at a Modern Times concert in Busan, South Korea, on December 1, 2013

In the same period, IU released her second Japanese extended-play album, Can You Hear Me?, featuring her first original Japanese songs. Two tracks from the album were released as singles; "Beautiful Dancer" and "New World" peaked at number 66 and 76 respectively on the Billboard Japan Hot 100. Rolling Stone Japan gave the album a positive review, highlighting "Beautiful Dancer" and "Truth" as stand-out tracks. In an interview with Oricon, IU recalled how shocked and touched she was to receive "Beautiful Dancer" and "Truth" from R&B producers Jimmy Jam and Terry Lewis. Her next Japanese single, "Monday Afternoon", was released on September 11, 2013, debuting at number 27 on Billboard Japan Hot 100 chart and number 9 on Japan's Oricon Daily Chart.

Almost two years after Last Fantasy, IU released her third studio album, Modern Times, on October 8, 2013. It was described to be "a big shift from the young singer's K-pop roots" that showcased a "more mature and sophisticated sound and image" than her previous work. IU composed and wrote two out of the album's 13 tracks, which ranged from swing to jazz, bossa nova, Latin pop and folk genres. The diversity of jazz styles and the mix of collaborative tracks were highlighted in reviews by Billboard and The Korea Herald. Modern Times debuted at number one on the Gaon Album Chart, while seven of its tracks achieved top ten positions on the Gaon Digital Chart with the lead single, "The Red Shoes" (분홍신), placing in the number one position. Similarly, the album debuted number four on Billboard's World Albums Chart, with twelve tracks in the K-pop Hot 100 chart. The album was ranked number two on Billboard's "25 Greatest K-Pop Albums of the 2010s" list.

On the second week of her promotional activities for Modern Times, IU decided to join the romantic-comedy series Bel Ami. She played the "quirky" and "playful" role of Kim Bo-tong, a carefree girl in her twenties who has had an unrequited crush on the male protagonist since high school. For her performance, IU was nominated in the Outstanding Korean Actress category at the 2014 Seoul International Drama Awards. In support of Modern Times, IU held her second concert tour with three shows which took place on November 23–24, 2013, at Kyung Hee University's Peace Hall in Seoul and ended on December 1, 2013, at KBS Hall in Busan. Promotions for Modern Times progressed into 2014 with IU performing in Hong Kong for the first time in a solo concert. A repackaged version of Modern Times, titled Modern Times — Epilogue, was released on December 20, 2013, with two additional tracks: "Friday" (금요일에 만나요) and "Pastel Crayon" (크레파스). Her self-composed track, "Friday", was originally intended to be included in Modern Times but was later released as the lead single of Modern Times — Epilogue. Described as a "mid-tempo, bossa nova number", "Friday" held the number one position on the Billboard Korea K-pop Hot 100 chart for two weeks after release. The lead single was successful on the Gaon Digital Chart, peaking at number one, and became the tenth best-selling digital single of 2014.

=== 2014: A Flower Bookmark ===
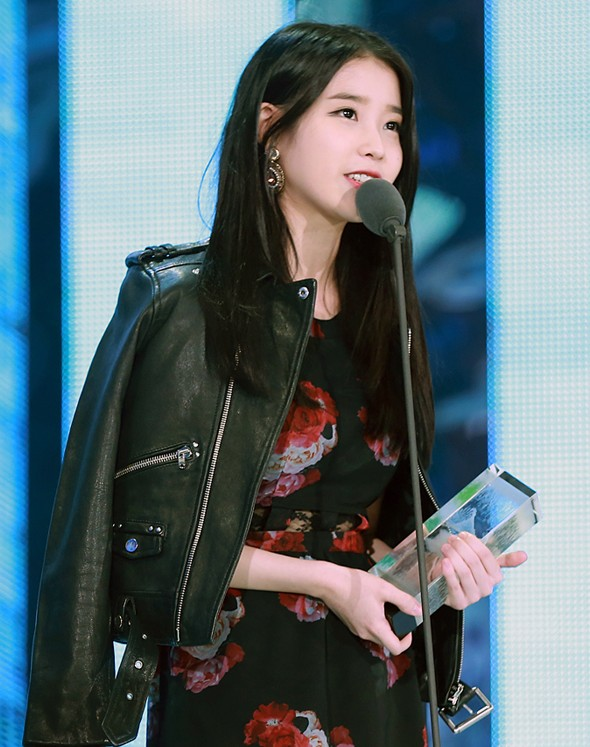
IU at the 2014 Melon Music Awards

IU released her fourth Korean extended-play and first cover album, A Flower Bookmark, on May 16, 2014. The album contains seven renditions of tracks that hailed from the 1980s and 1990s with a mixture of genres that included ballad, dance, folk and rock. The album came about at the request of fans and due to the positive feedback she had previously received for her cover songs. Three tracks debuted in the top ten of the Gaon Digital Chart on the week of release, with the main single, "My Old Story" (나의 옛날 이야기), ultimately peaking at number 2. However, it was her collaboration with Kim Chang-wan on the remake of his 1984 song, "The Meaning of You" (너의 의미), that became the best-selling track from the album and also her best-selling single of 2014. It was also well received critically.

IU's wish to conduct a more intimate and smaller scale concert was fulfilled in her third solo Korean concert series, "Just One Step... That Much More". The concert series took place over eight nights from May 22 to June 1 at Sogang University's Mary Hall, which had a capacity of 450 people. Tickets to all eight shows were sold out within 10 minutes of release on May 7, 2014. Profits made from the concerts were donated to the victims of the Sewol Ferry Disaster.

Two months after her solo concerts ended, IU made her debut performance in the United States at the KCON music festival held in Los Angeles on August 9–10. In their review, Los Angeles Times opined that IU had a "sprightly stage presence, and as a solo female singer, she's breaking the molds for K-pop stardom".

Throughout 2014, IU's collaborations with other artists spawned top-ten hits: "Not Spring, Love, or Cherry Blossoms" (봄, 사랑, 벚꽃 말고), the debut single of High4, which featured IU as lyricist and vocalist, reached number one on both the Gaon Digital Chart and Billboard Korea K-pop Hot 100; "Anxious Heart" (애타는 마음), recorded by Ulala Session and IU in 2012 but released more than a year later out of respect for the death of Ulala Session's lead vocalist, peaked at number four on the Gaon Digital Chart; "Sing for Me" (노래 불러줘요), which was released as part of g.o.d's eighth studio album, peaked at number nine on the Gaon Digital Chart; "Sogyeokdong" (소격동), written by Seo Taiji for his Quiet Night album and sung by IU in the October 2 release version, debuted at number four on the Gaon Digital Chart; and "When Would It Be" (언제쯤이면), a duet with her labelmate Yoon Hyun-sang for his debut album, Pianoforte, also peaked at number nine on the Gaon Digital Chart. After "Not Spring, Love, or Cherry Blossoms" topped Billboard Korea K-pop Hot 100 chart, IU became its "all-time chart leader" with five number-one songs and the artist who has spent the most weeks at number one since the chart's creation in September 2011.

=== 2015–2016: Continued acting success and further EP releases ===
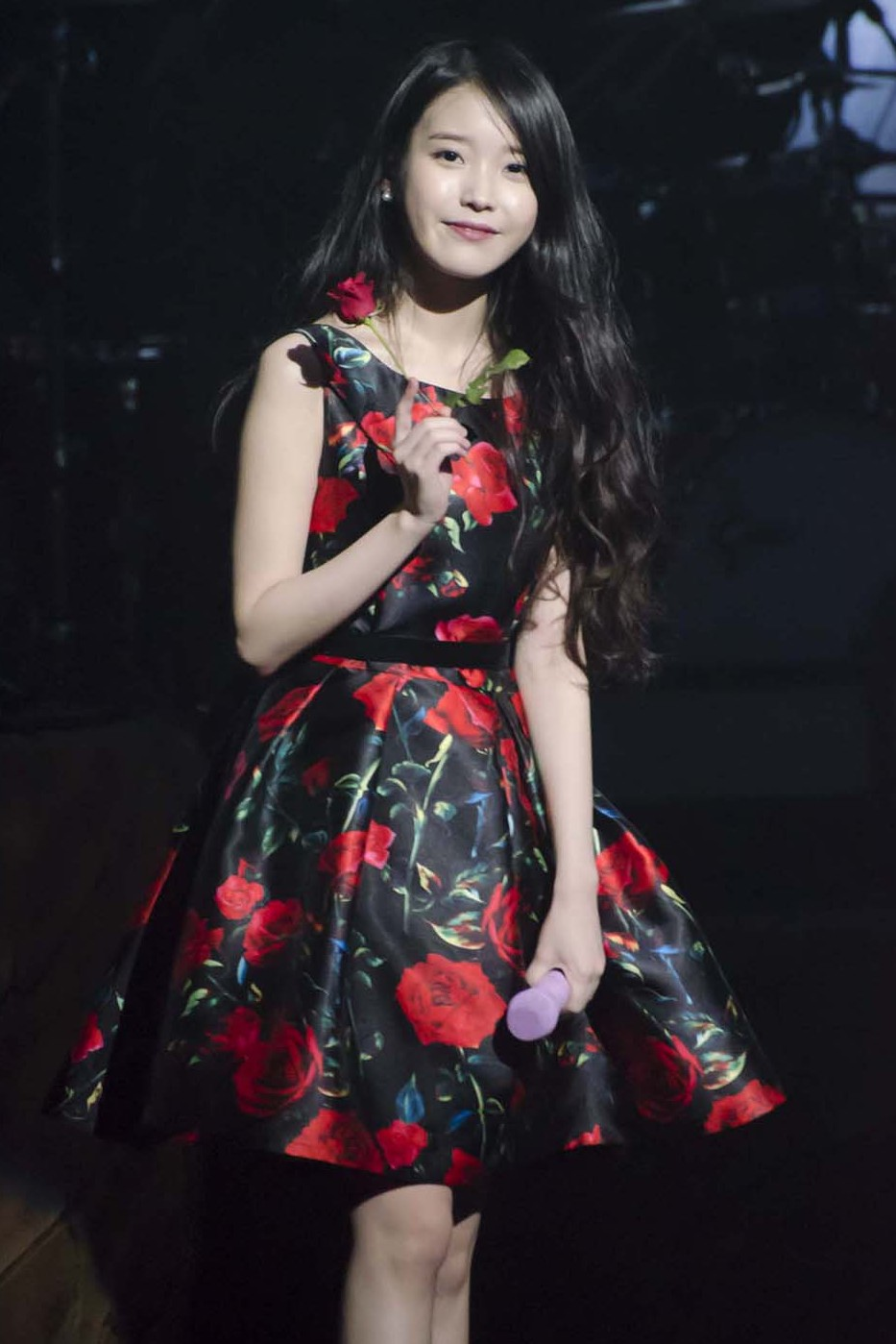
IU during her Chat-Shire tour on November 29, 2015

In 2015, two years after her last acting role, IU starred alongside Kim Soo-hyun, Cha Tae-hyun, and Gong Hyo-jin in The Producers, which was named as one of the most anticipated TV series of the year in South Korea. She played Cindy, a diva-like singer who decides to participate in a variety show to improve her public image. Analysing her character's perceived icy demeanor, IU commented that she could relate to her character's "biting attitude" and how similar her character was to herself. The series and IU's portrayal of Cindy were met with lukewarm reviews at the premier but both the viewership and critical response improved over the course of the series, peaking at 17.7% viewership for the last episode. She performed two songs in character, "Twenty Three" and "Heart" (마음), both of which were later included as bonus tracks on her 2015 album, Chat-Shire. While she wrote the lyrics for both songs, she also composed the music for "Heart", which was released as a digital single on May 18. "Heart" topped the charts upon its release and went on to become the tenth best-selling digital single of 2015 in South Korea. "Heart" was among a slew of K-pop songs used by South Korea's Defense Ministry in its propaganda broadcasts to North Korea during the two countries' tense standoff in August 2015, with the aim of advertising the "South Korean youth culture". Through The Producers, IU's popularity in China soared—reportedly receiving offers for several projects from Chinese companies.

After the completion of The Producers, IU participated in the biennial music festival event hosted by the variety show, Infinite Challenge, in which each participating singer-songwriter is partnered with one of the six hosts to create a song for the festival. The preparation process and festival event were aired over the course of seven episodes. She was partnered with Park Myeong-su, with whom she recorded and performed the song, "Leon" (as inspired by the film Léon: The Professional). The live performance event on August 13, 2015, attracted an estimated crowd of 40,000 at Alpensia Ski Jumping Stadium. Subsequent to the final episode's broadcast, "Leon" was released along with the other songs from the festival as a digital track and on the official festival album. "Leon" reached number one on all of South Korea's music charts upon release.

IU's fifth Korean extended play, Chat-Shire, was released digitally on October 23, 2015, prior to its physical release on October 27. IU asserted greater creative control on the album, writing the lyrics for all seven tracks (as well as the physical album's two bonus tracks) and composing the music for five tracks either individually or collaboratively. She was also credited as the album's executive producer. The lead single, "Twenty-Three", topped the national music charts upon release with several of the album's tracks also ranking in the top ten. The album reached a peak position of number four on Billboard's World Albums chart. Billboard described the album as a "must-hear" release, containing "some of [IU's] most personal music yet", and named "The Shower" (푸르던) as its stand-out track.

Despite positive critical reviews and success in the music charts, the album became controversial due to the lyrics of "Zezé" and the audio samples used in the bonus track "Twenty Three" (not to be confused with the similarly titled lead single). On November 4, the Korean publisher of the novel My Sweet Orange Tree, from which IU drew inspiration for the song "Zezé", stirred debate in the entertainment industry on freedom of interpretation when it leveled criticisms at IU for her interpretation of the five-year-old protagonist as a "sexual object". Two days later, IU issued a public statement: "I did not mean to turn Zeze into a sexual object... but I realize that my lyrics have offended many, and for this I apologize". On November 10, the publisher released an apology for its failure to acknowledge "diversity of interpretation". For the bonus track "Twenty Three", voice samples from Britney Spears' "Gimme More" were allegedly used without permission. Billboard ranked Chat-Shire the sixth best K-pop album of 2015, explaining that "IU knows how to take the sounds of yesterday and update them to stunning results".

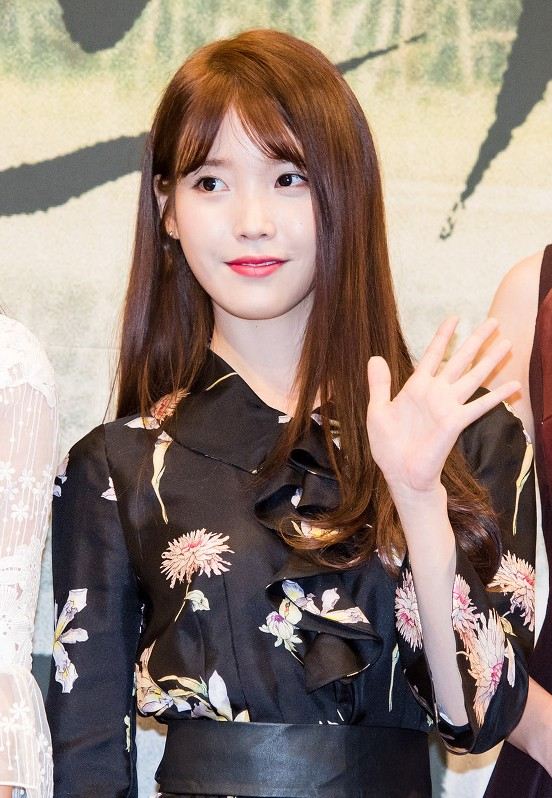
IU at the Moon Lovers: Scarlet Heart Ryeo press conference, August 2016

Prior to the release of Chat-Shire, LOEN announced that IU would not be partaking in broadcast promotions for the album and would instead be holding a national tour from November to December 2015. The Chat-Shire tour began in Seoul on November 21 and continued to Busan, Daegu and Gwangju, before returning to Seoul, where it ended on December 31. In the midst of her concert tour for Chat-Shire in South Korea, IU also increased promotional activities in Hong Kong, China and Taiwan, hosting fan-meetings and concerts in various cities as well as releasing a compilation album, Smash Hits, to the Taiwanese market on December 11, 2015. Containing 16 previously released songs, Smash Hits was published by Warner Music Taiwan and topped the K-pop album chart of Taiwan's leading online music store, KKBOX, on its first week of release. Tickets to her concert of January 10, 2016, in Taiwan also sold out within two minutes of going on sale. Towards the end of 2015, IU hosted SBS's annual end-of-year music program, Gayo Daejeon, with Shin Dong-yup. The program's producers said of their host selection, "IU has been deeply acknowledged for her musical talents, moving beyond the image of 'Korea's cute younger sister'". For her accomplishments in 2015, Ize listed IU as one of the "Persons of the Year", while GQ Korea named her as the "Woman of the Year". In September 2016, IU starred as the lead role, Hae Soo, in Moon Lovers: Scarlet Heart Ryeo, a Korean adaptation of the Chinese novel Bu Bu Jing Xin.

=== 2017–2018: Palette, A Flower Bookmark 2 and My Mister ===
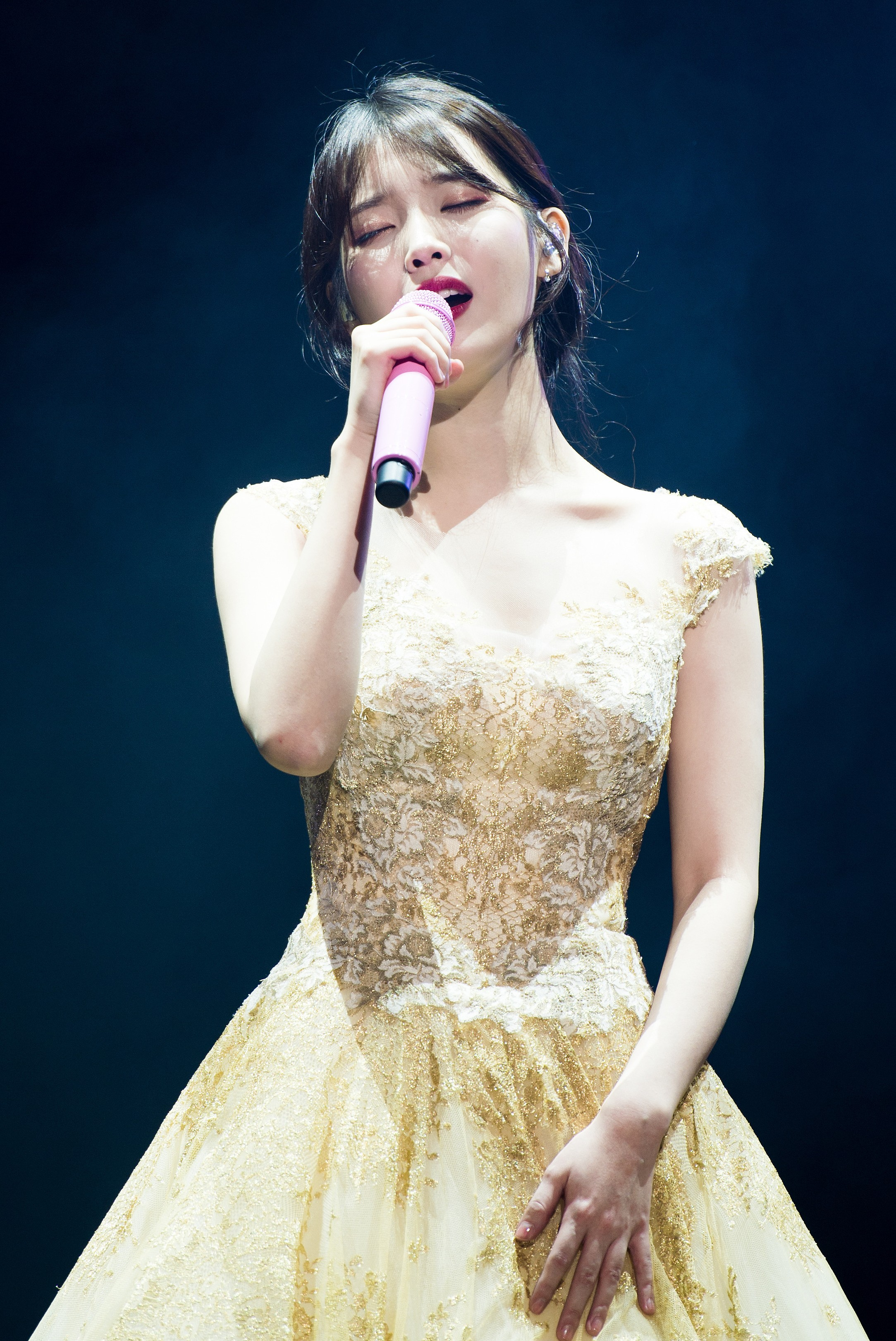
IU at her Palette concert in Seoul, South Korea, on December 10, 2017

IU released her fourth studio album, Palette, on April 21, 2017, of which she served as the primary lyricist and executive producer. Three singles were promoted prior to the release of the album; the lead single of the same name featuring G-Dragon from BigBang; as well as two pre-release tracks "Through the Night" and "Can't Love You Anymore". Palette (팔레트) debuted atop Billboard World Albums chart, a first in her career, and topped local charts in both album sales and downloads. Palette was a commercial success, with all three singles from the album peaking at the top of the Gaon Digital Chart, with the lead single, "Palette" spending a total of two weeks at number 1. However, it was her first pre-release track, "Through the Night" that became the best-selling track from the album and also her best-selling single of 2017.

Palette was also critically acclaimed and received multiple accolades, including "Best Pop Album" at the 15th Korean Music Awards, "Album of the Year" at the Melon Music Awards, and "Record of the Year (Album)" award at the 27th Seoul Music Awards; IU herself was awarded the Best Female Artist at the Mnet Asian Music Awards. The album also earned IU a "Best Songwriter" award at the Melon Music Awards, a "Lyricist of the Year" award at the seventh Gaon Chart Music Awards and a "Producer of the Year" award for herself and her production team. IU also received the "Song of the Year" award at the 32nd Golden Disc Awards for her hit song "Through the Night". Billboard magazine listed "Palette" at number six on its list of "Best K-Pop Songs of 2017". The New York Times Magazine also featured "Palette" on its list of "25 Songs That Tell Us Where Music Is Going", making IU the only Asian artist to make the list while appreciating IU's ability as a singer-songwriter to project authenticity in K-pop. Furthermore, Billboard ranked Palette the best K-pop album of 2017, explaining that "An album as impressive and sonically diverse as Palette proves why injecting an artist's personal experiences into their music can lead to their greatest work yet".

IU released her sixth Korean extended-play and second cover album, A Flower Bookmark 2 on September 22, 2017. Prior to the album's release, a single titled "Autumn Morning" was released without prior notice on September 18 to mark the singer's ninth anniversary. She later went on a tour in various cities around Korea as well as Hong Kong from November to December 2017 to promote the album. IU was also featured in the title song, "Love Story", of Epik High's ninth album, We've Done Something Wonderful, which was released on October 23, 2017. Gallup Korea ranked her the most popular K-pop artist of 2017 (she previously topped the ranking in 2014) and also the most popular K-pop idol of the year.

In March 2018, IU starred in tvN's My Mister, playing the character Lee Ji-an. The series was commercially and critically successful with peak audience ratings of 7.3% making it one of the highest rated Korean dramas in cable television history, and positive reviews for IU's performance. IU then contributed her vocals to Zico's "Soulmate", which was released on July 23, 2018. Upon release, the single topped the daily and real time charts of all six major Korean music sites and claimed the number-one position on the Gaon Digital Chart.

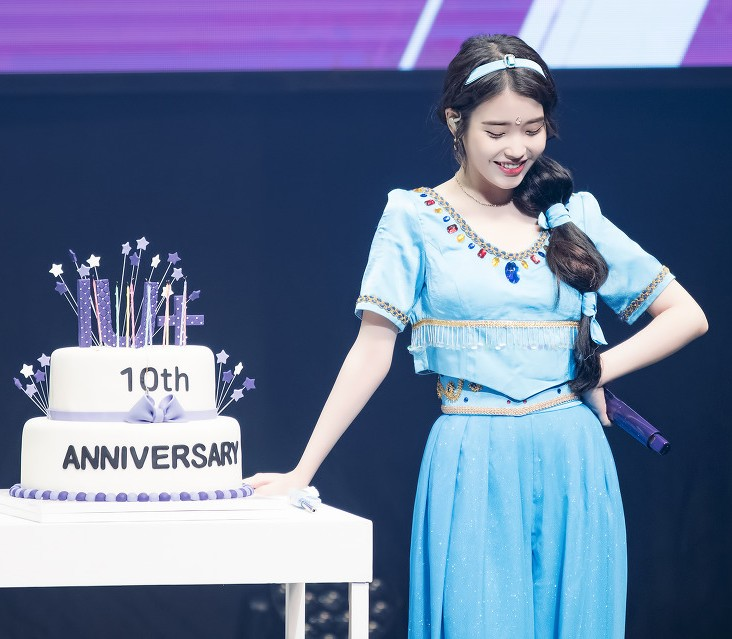
IU at her 10th anniversary fanmeeting 'IU+' in September 2018

To commemorate her tenth debut anniversary, IU released a single titled "Bbibbi" on October 10, 2018. The song surpassed one million unique listeners on Korea's largest music site, Melon, only 16 hours after its release, and by 23 hours in, it broke the previous 24-hour unique listener record set by her duet "Leon" with Park Myung-su in 2015. "Bbibbi" went on to record a total of 1,462,625 unique listeners in the first 24 hours of its release. The single peaked at number one on the Gaon Digital Chart, and at number five on the Billboard's World Digital Songs Chart. Billboard magazine listed "Bbibbi" at number 87 on its list of "Best Songs of 2018", explaining "The single not only comments on IU's experiences in the public life, but it doubles as a universal empowerment anthem, knowing and acknowledging one's worth and personal rights". The single was also listed at number 4 on Billboard's list of "The 20 Best K-pop Songs of 2018". IU began her first Asian tour, titled IU 10th Anniversary Tour Concert, on October 28, 2018. Two months later, IU featured on Kim Dong-ryul's "Fairytale", which peaked at number four on the Gaon Digital Chart.

=== 2019–2021: Hotel del Luna, Love Poem and Lilac ===
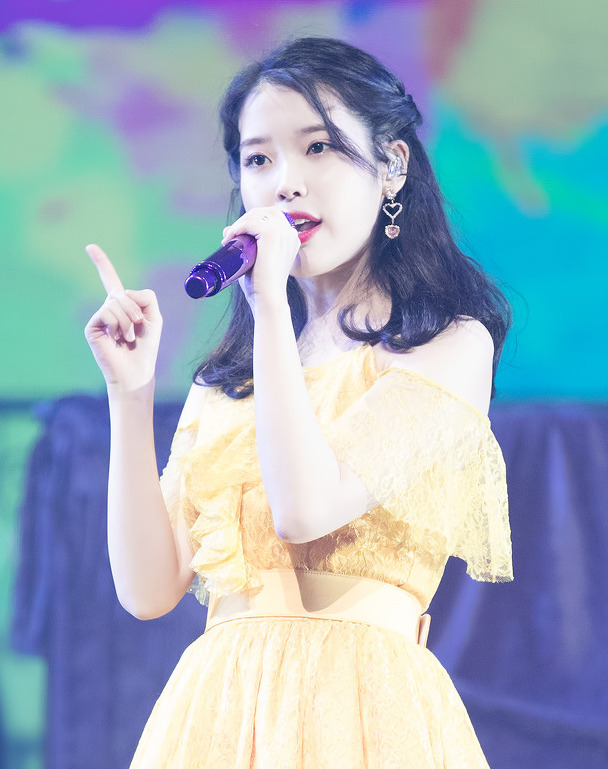
IU at a concert in Jeju during the Dlwlrma tour on January 5, 2019

On April 11, 2019, IU made her film debut in the Netflix anthology series Persona. She portrayed different characters in each of the four short films which were written and directed by the critically acclaimed directors Lee Kyoung-mi, Yim Pil-sung, Jeon Go-woon and Kim Jong-kwan. It was the sixth most popular program on Netflix in Korea in 2019. During the summer, IU starred in the fantasy mystery drama Hotel del Luna, written by the Hong Sisters. She also sang one of the songs on the soundtrack, "Happy Ending". The drama was a commercial success, recording the highest ratings in its timeslot throughout its run.

IU was set to release her seventh Korean extended play, Love Poem, on November 1, 2019; however, she decided to postpone the EP's release to November 18 following her close friend Sulli's death. Her single "Peach" (2012), inspired by Sulli, re-entered charts as a tribute to the late singer. The EP's eponymous lead single was released as planned, subsequently peaking at number one on the Gaon Digital Chart, and at number nine on Billboard's World Digital Songs Chart. On November 2, 2019, IU began her second Asian tour, titled Love Poem, in Gwangju. Nearly 90,000 fans attended her two-month tour during which she visited 10 cities.

For the first time in nine years, IU participated in a soundtrack album with the song "Give You My Heart" for the hit romantic comedy Crash Landing on You. Released on February 15, 2020, it debuted at number 71 on South Korea's Gaon Digital Chart, 2020, rising and reaching number one the following week. On May 6, 2020, IU released the single "Eight" featuring and produced by BTS's Suga. As the song's title derives from the last digit of the Korean age "twenty-eight" of both artists, it follows IU's previous singles "Twenty-Three" (2015) and "Palette" (2017) which together comprise her "coming-of-age" series. On June 19, 2020, IU released the song "Into the I-LAND" as the signal song for the survival reality show I-Land. In December 2020, Melon revealed its chart of the top 100 songs of the 2010s (the 10 years from 2010 to 2019). IU was the artist who landed the most songs on the chart by far, with 11 of her songs making it into the top 100.

On January 9, 2021, IU won Song of the Year at the 35th Golden Disc Awards for "Blueming", becoming the first female soloist to win two grand prizes in the award show's history. While onstage accepting her award, she hinted that she would be soon returning with a new single titled "Celebrity" and that the new song would have a refreshing and cheerful pop sound. Two days later, Edam Entertainment confirmed her return with the pre-release single "Celebrity" on January 27, 2021. On March 3, she announced her fifth studio album, Lilac, which was released on March 25 to immediate commercial success. The album debuted atop the Gaon Album Chart, and all tracks had simultaneously charted in the top 30 of the Gaon Digital Chart. In October, IU announced that her digital single "Strawberry Moon" would be released on October 19. IU later teased her eighth Korean extended play Pieces, which was released on December 29.

=== 2022–2024: Broker, The Winning and first world tour ===
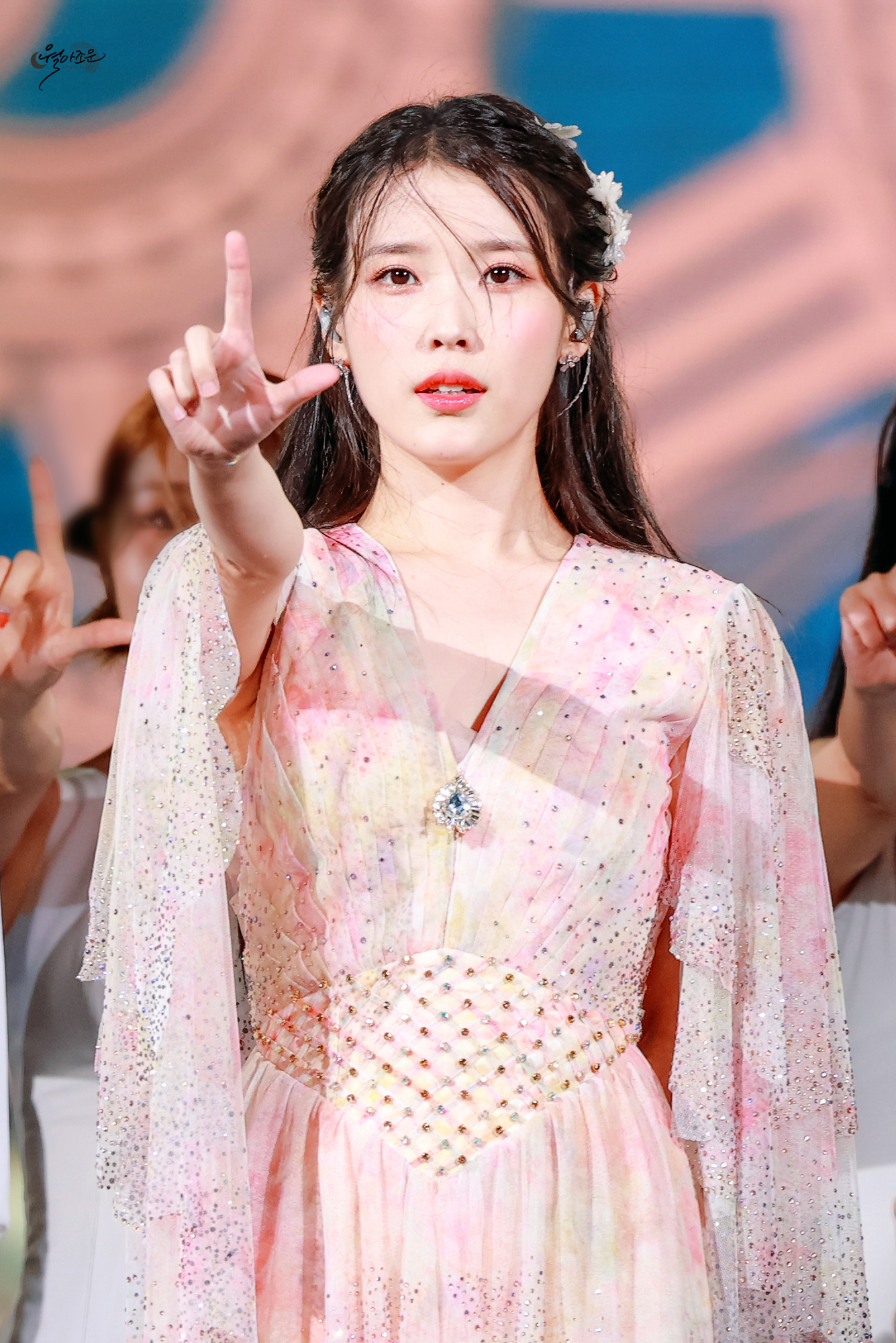
IU performing at The Golden Hour: Under the Orange Sun concert on September 17, 2022

IU's first project of 2022 was the collaborative single "Ganadara" with Jay Park, which peaked at number one on both the Gaon Digital Chart and the Billboard K-pop Hot 100. Her first documentary, Pieces: 29th Winter, was scheduled to release on March 16 but was later postponed to March 23.

The following month, IU starred in the film Broker, playing single mother So-young, who initially decides to leave her newborn at a baby box but later changes her mind and tries to retrieve her child. Director Hirokazu Kore-eda choose to cast IU after seeing her moving performance in My Mister (2018), as he felt that she was the only actress who could embody So-young's character. Film critic Ben Rolph praised IU's performance, writing that "it is K-pop singer-turned actor Lee Ji-eun who leads the ensemble down its path of brilliance as she performs her heart out, she is the soul of the film". The performance earned her a nomination for Best New Actress at the 27th Chunsa International Film Festival.

On September 17 and 18, IU held a concert, The Golden Hour: Under the Orange Sun, at the Seoul Olympic Stadium, becoming the first Korean female artist to perform there.

On April 4, 2023, Big Hit Music announced the second collaboration between IU and BTS member Suga, under his moniker Agust D, for the song titled "People Pt. 2". The song was released on April 7 as a pre-release track for Suga's first solo album D-Day. In the same month, Lee Byeong-heon's Dream was released in theaters, marking IU's first feature film role. Later on, she held the media art exhibition "Moment" from July 21 to August 20, 2023, at Galleria Forêt The Seoul Lightium in Seongdong District, Seoul, to commemorate the 15th anniversary of her debut.

IU released the pre-release single "Love Wins All" on January 24, 2024, with the song debuting atop the Circle Digital Chart. The single would be part of her ninth Korean extended play The Winning, which was released on February 20. She then toured Asia, North America and Europe with the IU HEREH World Tour. The final concert of the tour, held at Seoul World Cup Stadium in September, marked the first entry by a female musician into the venue and the 100th concert of her career. In December 2024, IU was cast as the main lead of romance drama Perfect Crown opposite actor Byeon Woo-seok.

=== 2025–present: When Life Gives You Tangerines, A Flower Bookmark 3 and Perfect Crown ===
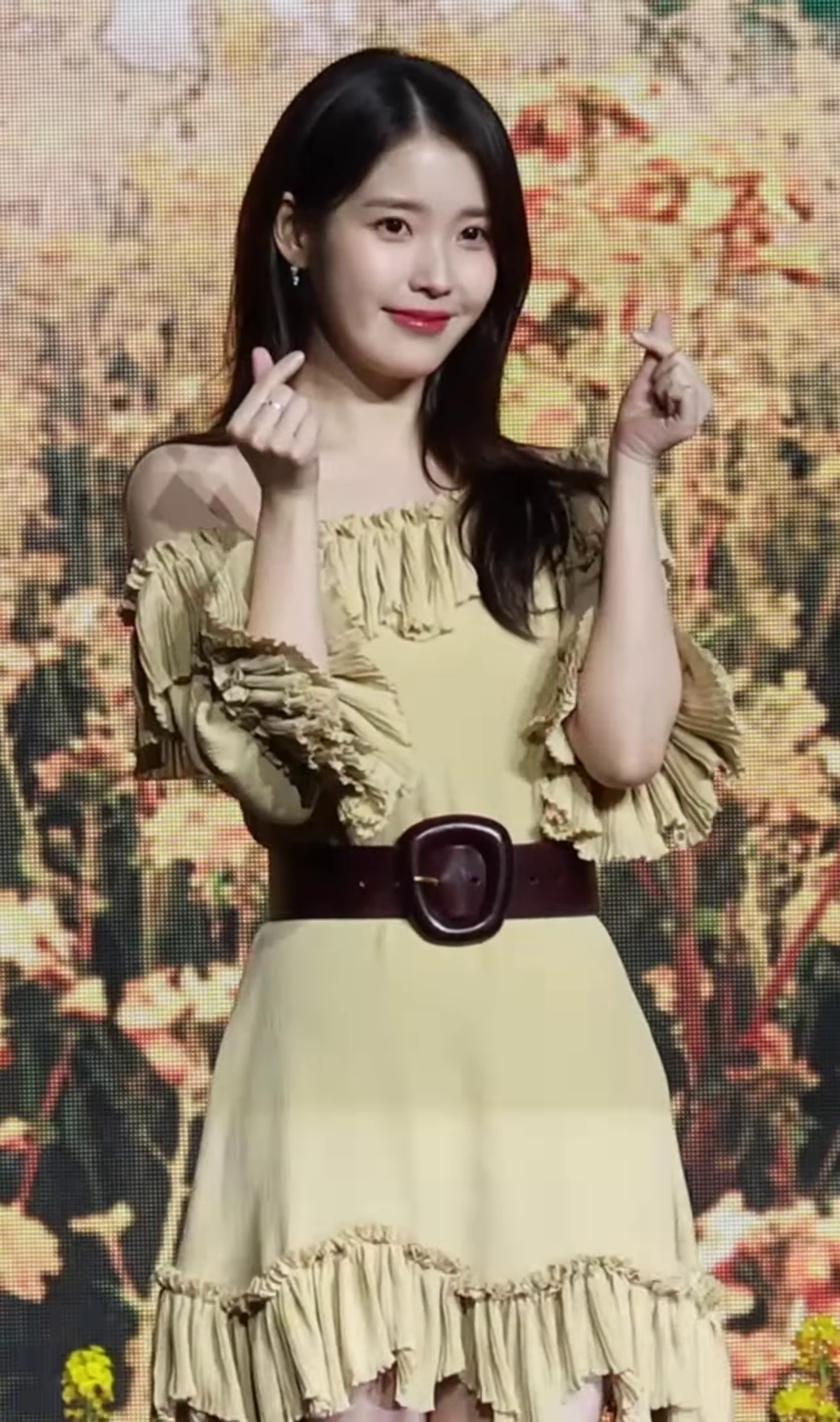
IU at a press conference for When Life Gives You Tangerines on March 5, 2025

In March 2025, IU starred in screenwriter Lim Sang-choon's television series When Life Gives You Tangerines opposite Park Bo-gum. A domestic and international hit, IU and Park's performances received widespread audience and critical acclaim, and they were both nominated at the 61st Baeksang Arts Awards, and IU received the "Best Actress" award at the 4th Blue Dragon Series Awards. On April 21, NetEase Cloud Music named IU as the most streamed Korean artist in the platform's 12-year history with more than 3.9 billion streams. On May 27, IU returned as a singer, releasing her tenth Korean extended play and third cover album A Flower Bookmark 3, with actor Heo Nam-jun and singer-actor Cha Eun-woo making special appearances in the music videos for the album tracks "Never Ending Story" and "A Beautiful Person" respectively.

IU released the digital single "Bye, Summer" on September 10. She then held a fan meet-up titled 2025 IU Fan Meet-Up (Bye, Summer) on September 13 and 14 at the KSPO Dome to celebrate her 17th debut anniversary, becoming the first K-pop soloist and actress to hold a fan meeting at the venue. In December, IU attended the 10th Asia Artist Awards winning the grand prize for "Artist of the Year (Actor)", for her performance in When Life Gives You Tangerines. Gallup Korea ranked IU as the Gallup Korea's Singer of the Year for 2025 (she previously topped the ranking in 2014 and 2017), she was also ranked 2nd in Gallup Korea's Television Actor of the Year for 2025, becoming the first artist to rank within the top two of both categories in the same year. In 2026, IU was named one of the Golden Disc Awards' 40 Powerhouse Artists, honoring influential musicians for the show's 40th anniversary.

In April 2026, IU starred opposite actor Byeon Woo-seok in the television series Perfect Crown, a romantic comedy set in a fictional 21st-century constitutional monarchy South Korea. IU released the digital single "Unknown Planet" on September 10, featuring double lead tracks "Unknown Planet" and "Dear My Crazy Soulmate" — both written by herself. She then was featured in Crush's single "seesaw" released on October 21st.

== Artistry ==
=== Songwriting ===
IU has been credited for writing over seventy-six songs over the course of her career, including music for her career as a solo artist, songs for other performers and various songs for film or drama. The first two songs for which she received songwriting credit were Yoo Seung-ho's "Believe in Love", which she featured on, for the compilation album Road for Hope, and "Alone in the Room" from her third extended play (EP) Real. Her first self-composition was "Hold My Hand" for The Greatest Love in 2011. Considering the fact that she wrote the song not for herself but at the behest of the drama's producers, IU found the experience difficult as she had to match the drama's cheerful tone. On her second studio album Last Fantasy, IU began to take more creative control over her music, writing six of the thirteen total tracks. Her following studio album Modern Times saw her writing the lyrics for two of the songs, while collaborating with South Korean lyricist Kim Eana, who had previously written multiple tracks on Last Fantasy. IU wrote the lyrics to each track on her subsequent releases, Chat-Shire and Palette, with the exception of one song on the latter, and served as executive producer of both. The lyrics on her fifth EP Love Poem were entirely self-written, and she received composition credits on two tracks, "The Visitor" and "Blueming". IU wrote lyrics to all the tracks on her fifth studio album, Lilac; additionally, she helped compose two of the album's singles, "Coin" and "Celebrity". In 2021, she also released the album Pieces consisting of five acoustic and orchestral songs, entirely in Korean, written, composed, arranged and produced by IU over the years. The lyrics on her sixth EP The Winning were entirely self written, and she received composition credits on the track "Holssi".

IU has also written and performed multiple songs for various South Korean films and dramas, including The Producers, My Mister, Bel Ami and Hotel Del Luna. Nineteen of the tracks written by IU have been released as singles, with fifteen of those reaching the top of the Gaon Digital Chart, including "Through the Night" and "Friday", the third and fifth best-selling singles in South Korea, with more than seven million and five million sales, respectively.

According to The Korea Herald, consolation is one of the core themes explored in IU's music, most notably in "Through the Night" and "Dear Name", both songs from Palette.

=== Voice ===
IU possesses a soprano vocal range, with acoustician and professor Myung-jin Bae expressing her range also has mezzo-soprano qualities when writing an article comparing her voice to Hyun Bin. Her vocal ability is often met with positive reception. Monique Danao of South China Morning Post noted that IU could quickly transition from a "sweet" voice to "hit powerful notes". On his 2011 academic paper co-written by Doo-heon Kyon at Soongsil University, Bae used "Good Day" as the basis for his vocal analysis, stating that when IU reached the highest note (F♯_{5}) in the three-note increment, her stability in frequency showed a lengthy duration with abundant lung capacity, and commenting that she "expresses well beyond the highest range required by the soprano [voice type]".

== Awards and achievements ==
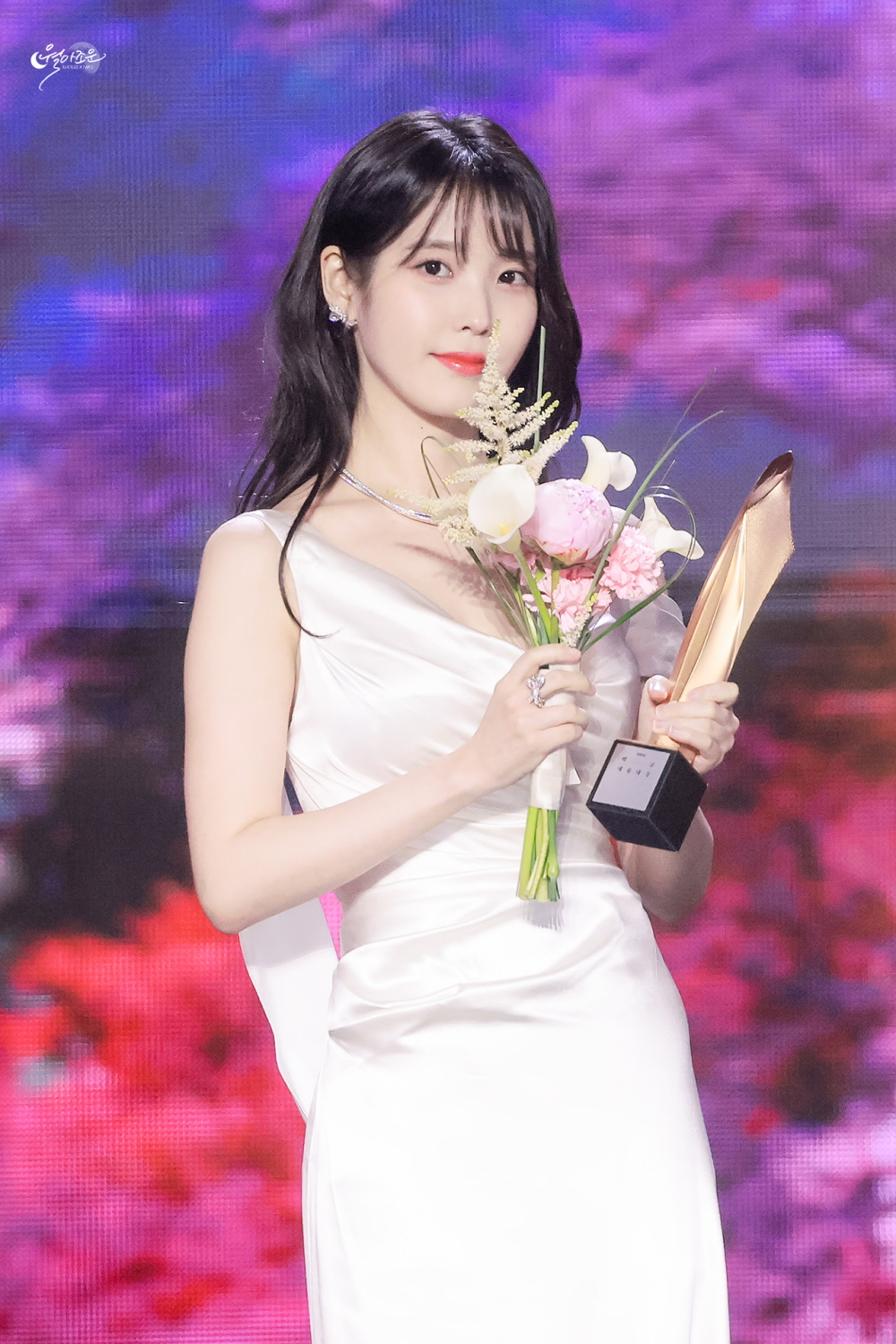
IU at the 2023 Baeksang Arts Awards

Since her debut in 2008, IU has received over 200 award nominations, winning over 100 of them. She has won twenty-six Melon Music Awards, sixteen Gaon Chart Music Awards, five Korean Music Awards, fifteen Mnet Asian Music Awards, seven Seoul Music Awards, and nine Golden Disc Awards. IU has also won several awards for her work as an actress, earning the title "Best New Actress" at the 2014 KBS Drama Awards for her performance in You're the Best, Lee Soon-shin. In 2025 she won the award for "Best Actress" at the 4th Blue Dragon Series Awards, and the Daesang at the 2025 APAN Star Awards for her performance in the netflix television series When Life Gives You Tangerines.

IU has received twelve Daesang (Note: A daesang (Korean: 대상), which translates to "grand prize", is the highest honour given out at South Korean music (and television) award ceremonies in recognition of the artist(s) with the greatest physical and digital achievements for the year.) awards from various award shows, including five from the Melon Music Awards and three from the Golden Disc Awards. In 2012, she was named to the Forbes Korea Power Celebrity list as one of the most influential people in South Korea, and has since been mentioned six times. Additionally, IU was honored at the 2015 Korean Popular Culture and Arts Awards, held by the Korean Ministry of Culture, Sports and Tourism, for her influence and success in the music industry. In 2022, she was recipient of the Visionary Award, instituted by CJ ENM, which recognizes talents from the Korean film and television industry for their contributions to "leading trends and spearheading innovations".

== Other ventures ==
=== Activism ===
In December 2024, IU provided prepaid meals and snacks to people participating in protests, calling for the impeachment of South Korean president Yoon Suk Yeol, following his declaration of martial law. Yoon supporters have subsequently left malicious comment on her social media accounts, accusing her of being a "leftist" and calling for boycotts of her endorsed products.

=== Philanthropy ===
In 2010, two years after her debut, IU donated all the proceeds from her duet songs with actor Yoo Seung-ho and Na Yoon-kwon, while in 2011, she donated the proceeds from her fan meeting. In 2012, she donated all proceeds from her duet with Kim Yuna to the national figure skating team. That same year, she was chosen as an ambassador for South Korea's National Police Agency in their anti-bullying campaigns in schools; she was made an honorary member of the police force in 2013 before being promoted to an honorary senior police officer in 2014 for a two-year term. In late 2012, she donated ₩10 million to her high school alma-mater as a development fund to buy new books, which became an annual occurrence. She also established a scholarship there in 2016.

In 2015, IU volunteered and donated to the Green Umbrella Children's Foundation. She has been a regular donor since 2018, helping to support tuition for prospective college students among low-income families, single parents, disabled children, and grandparents raising their grandchildren. She makes regular donations on her birthday, debut anniversary and special occasions to foundations helping not only children, but marginalized groups in society such as unwed mothers, elderly people, cancer patients and the homeless, both under her name and her fandom's. She has been supporting vulnerable social groups in Yangpyeong County since 2020, reaching a total of ₩145 million at the end of 2024.

In 2014, 2018 and 2023, she participated in the Ice Bucket Challenge, an Internet challenge designed to promote Amyotrophic lateral sclerosis (ALS) awareness, and donated ₩60 million. In 2019, after having to learn sign language for My Mister the year before, IU donated ₩50 million to the Deaf Senior Citizens Support Center. Her philanthropy efforts throughout the year earned her a mention in Forbes' "Asia's 2019 Heroes of Philanthropy: Catalysts For Change", being the youngest to have made the list.

During COVID-19 pandemic in 2020, she donated 3,000 pieces of medical protective clothing and about 4,600 cooling vests for nurses. In January 2023, she featured in charity song "One Step" to promote disability awareness, and in April 2023 she held a pizza party for students and teachers at Milal School, a special school for the developmentally disabled, offering rice cakes prepared by her mother.

IU has also supported natural disaster relief efforts, and in November 2026, she received a commendation from the Commissioner of the National Fire Agency: throughout the years, she donated ₩100 million to help the victims of floods in August 2020, ₩100 million each for residents affected by the 2022 Uljin and Samcheok wildfires and the South Korean floods, and ₩200 million to wildfire relief efforts in North and South Gyeongsang in March 2025.

As of June 2025, IU has donated more than ₩7 billion since her debut, and over ₩1.5 billion in 2022 alone.

=== Endorsements ===
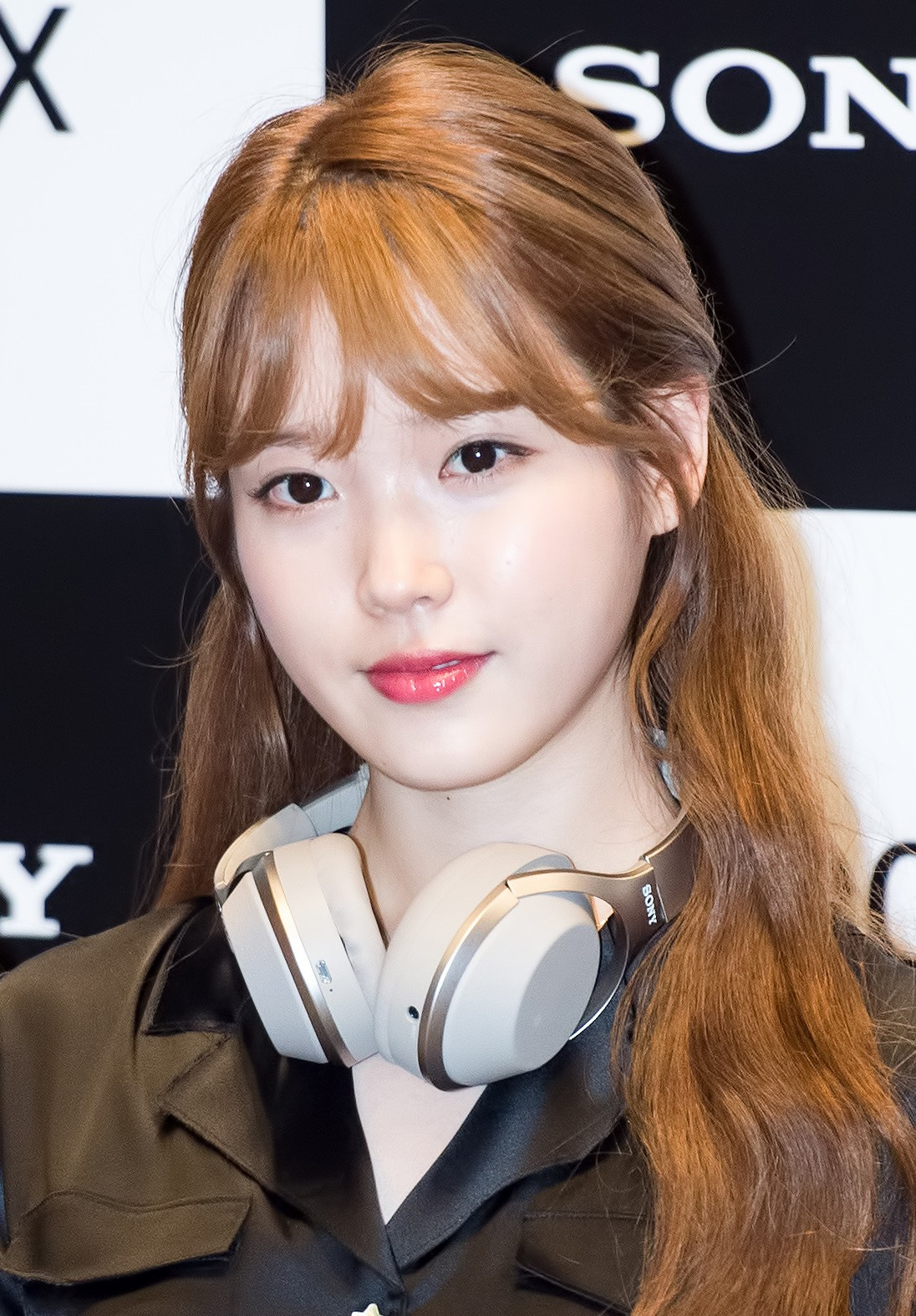
IU at a Sony product launching event on September 20, 2017

IU is one of the highest-earning celebrities in South Korea, with endorsements attributing to a proportion of her income. Over the course of her career, she has endorsed various products that ranged from electronics to clothing and cosmetics. Her breakthrough in 2010 earned her the first three endorsement deals she had with Crown Confectionery's MyChew candy, Crown Bakery and clothing brand Y'sb. Among her first endorsements that year were also video games. When developer Ntreev Soft had chosen IU to endorse MMORPG Alicia: The Story of My Horse and I, they cited her "simple and innocent" image had complemented with the game's vibe, and featured her in the soundtrack. IU announced the player introductions for the Global StarCraft II League — she later performed at the finals of the league in 2011.

IU has continuously been featured by Samsung for its advertisements for products such as Anycall, Galaxy S II, Wave 3, (Note: In 2012, alongside Yim Si-wan and Hwang Kwanghee, IU starred in "20, Start of a Wave", a three-part drama advertising the product.) and Samsung Card in 2018–19. Samsung also added a feature to have her voice for the Celeb Alarm in late-December 2019. Additionally, IU was the ambassador for Expo 2012 held in Yeosu. Following the release of A Flower Bookmark, she participated in Sony Korea's promotional campaign for its MDR-series headphones with You Hee-yeol and continued to be a representative for the brand's audio products through 2015. IU has modeled for clothing brands Unionbay and Le Coq Sportif from 2011, the SK Planet online store 11st, G by GUESS with Yoo Seung-ho, Elite with Infinite, SBENU with Song Jae-rim, Black Yak, and J.Estina jewelry. Gucci appointed IU as its brand ambassador for South Korea in February 2020, and later as global brand ambassador in March 2022: the singer has posed with its clothing in numerous pictorials. Later in July 2021, New Balance also announced IU as its global brand ambassador and started partnering for its "We Got Now" campaign. As for cosmetic brands, IU has endorsed the SAEM, Qdsuh in China, ISOI, and CNP Cosmetics. (Note: She was chosen to endorse the company by LG Household & Health Care in 2017.) After IU returned to endorse Unionbay in 2015 with Lee Hyun-woo and ISOI selected her as a model for two years, the two entities sponsored The Producers, in which IU had a leading role, through product placement.

In April 2022, IU was selected as an advertising model by Woori Financial Group, owner of one of the four largest banks in South Korea, for her influence across various generations. That same month, the MAU (monthly active users) using its services increased by 100,000, reaching 5.8 million users. The next month, it exceeded 6 million users, an increase of about 500,000. A spokesperson of Woori said that they believed it was an effect of IU's endorsement. Other endorsements include S-Oil, Homeplus, Nongshim's products, (Note: Shin Ramyun and Hoo Roo Rook (the latter with Park Bo-gum)) fast-food chain Mexicana Chicken, and Jeju Samdasoo and Binggrae Banana Flavored Milk both in mid-2020. In November 2014, HiteJinro announced that IU had become the spokesperson for Chamisul soju. They renewed a contract with her in December 2015. In April 2024, Estée Lauder announced IU as its first Korean global brand ambassador. IU has also worked with governmental and cultural institutions to promote Korean culture and tourism. In July 2025, she was appointed ambassador by the customs division of the Incheon International Airport.

She was the female model with the most advertising appearances on television in 2024, starring in commercials for 13 different brands. In July 2025, Colgate and IU partnered for its Optic White Purple toothpaste. In November 2025, Ricola appointed IU as its brand ambassador across Asia. In July 2026, watch maison Jaeger-LeCoultre announced IU as its global brand ambassador.

== Personal life ==
IU is best friends with fellow actress and You Are the Best! co-star Yoo In-na, whom she has known since they met on the television show Heroes in 2010. She has written three songs about Yoo or inspired by her: "You", "Drama", and "Dear My Crazy Soulmate".

IU was in a relationship with indie rock singer Chang Kiha from 2013 to 2017. In 2021, South China Morning Post estimated IU's net worth to be around US$31–45 million, making her the wealthiest female Korean idol singer. From December 2022 to July 2026, IU was in a relationship with actor Lee Jong-suk.

In March 2022, she revealed she had been diagnosed with a chronic Patulous Eustachian tube dysfunction. She experienced hearing difficulties in September 2022 during her concert at Seoul Olympic Stadium, and the release of her sixth full album and domestic tour, originally scheduled for September 2026, were postponed for a few months due to worsening symptoms.

== Discography ==
- Growing Up (2009)
- Last Fantasy (2011)
- Modern Times (2013)
- Palette (2017)
- Lilac (2021)

== Filmography ==
Selected filmography

- Dream High (2011)
- You Are the Best! (2013)
- Bel Ami (2013)
- The Producers (2015)
- Moon Lovers: Scarlet Heart Ryeo (2016)
- My Mister (2018)
- Hotel del Luna (2019)
- Broker (2022)
- Dream (2023)
- When Life Gives You Tangerines (2025)
- Perfect Crown (2026)

== Tours ==
- Real Fantasy (2012)
- Modern Times (2013)
- Chat-Shire (2015)
- 24 Steps: One, Two, Three, Four (2016–2017)
- Palette (2017)
- Dlwlrma (2018)
- Love, Poem (2019)
- The Golden Hour: Under the Orange Sun (2022)
- IU HEREH World Tour (2024)
