= IU...IM =

EP by IU
- Released: November 12, 2009
- Recorded: 2009
- Studios: LOEN Studio; T Studio; Vitamin Studio; Orange Shock Studio; Music Cube Studio; Sonic Korea Studio
- Genre: K-pop
- Length: 24:51
- Language: Korean
- Label: LOEN
- Producer: Choi Gap-won

IU chronology
Growing Up (2009)	IU...IM (2009)	Real (2010)

Singles from IU...IM
- 1. "Marshmallow" Released: November 12, 2009

IU...IM is the second Korean-language extended play (EP) by South Korean singer-songwriter IU. It was released by LOEN Entertainment on November 12, 2009. The extended play was recorded at various studios throughout Seoul, South Korea. It spawned the single "Marshmallow", featuring uncredited rap verses from Zico.

== Track listing ==
Track listing
No.	Title	Lyrics	Music	Arrangement	Length
1.	"Love Attack"	Han Sang-won, Choi Gap-won	Han Sang-won	Yoon Young-min	3:10
2.	"Taking a Train" (기차를 타고; Gichareul Tago)	Choi Gap-won	Lee Hyun-seung	Lee Hyun-seung	3:43
3.	"Marshmallow" (마쉬멜로우; Mashimello^{[a]})	Choi Gap-won	Kim Do-hoon, PJ	Kim Do-hoon, PJ	3:14
4.	"Morning Tears" (아침 눈물; Achim Nunmul)	Choi Gap-won	PJ, Lee Jong-hoon	Lee Jong-hoon	3:50
5.	"Heartbeating Date" (두근두근 데이트; Dugeundugeun Deiteu)	Choi Gap-won	Lee Jong-hoon, Min Woong-shik	Lee Jong-hoon, Min Woong-shik	3:21
6.	"Taking a Train" (instrumental)		Lee Hyun-seung	Lee Hyun-seung	3:43
7.	"Morning Tears" (instrumental)		PJ, Lee Jong-hoon	Lee Jong-hoon	3:50
Total length:					26:38

Notes

- ^{^[a]} The song contains uncredited rapping by Zico of Block B, who was then a trainee.

== Charts ==
Chart performance for IU...IM
Chart (2012)	Peak position
South Korean Albums (Gaon)	7

=== Singles ===
Chart performance for "Marshmallow"
Chart (2010)	Peak position
South Korea (Gaon)	39
