= Lost and Found (IU EP) =

EP by IU
- Released: September 23, 2008
- Recorded: 2008 in Seoul, South Korea (Booming Studio, Vitamin Studio and Sonic Studio)
- Genre: K-pop
- Length: 21:45
- Language: Korean
- Label: LOEN Entertainment
- Producers: Choi Gap-won, Lee Jong-hoon

IU chronology
Lost and Found (2008)	Growing Up (2009)

Singles from Lost and Found
- 1. "Lost Child" Released: September 18, 2008

Lost and Found is the debut extended play (EP) by South Korean singer-songwriter IU. It was released by LOEN Entertainment on September 23, 2008. IU collaborated with lyricist and producer Choi Gap-won, who had previously produced songs including "Amnesia" by Gummy, "Incurable Disease" by Wheesung, and "Toc Toc Toc" by Lee Hyori. Lee Jong-hoon of Soul-Shop and the singer Mario additionally worked on the title song, "Lost Child".

== Background ==
The music video for "Lost Child" (Korean: 미아; RR: Mia), featuring Thunder, was uploaded through LOEN Entertainment's official YouTube channel on July 19, 2011, after the singer rose to stardom with the success of "Good Day".

== Track listing ==
Track listing
No.	Title	Lyrics	Music	Arrangement	Length
1.	"Ugly Duckling" (미운 오리; Miun ori)	Choi Gap-won	PJ	PJ, Kim Young-hwan	3:28
2.	"Lost Child" (미아; Mia)	Choi Gap-won	Min Woong-shik, Lee Jong-hoon	Lee Jong-hoon	3:42
3.	"You Know" (있잖아; Itjana, featuring Mario)	Choi Gap-won, Seo Jung-jin	Kim Se-jin, Seo Jung-jin	Seo Jung-jin, Kim Se-jin	3:21
4.	"Feel So Good"	Choi Gap-won	Kim Young-hwan, PJ	PJ	4:03
5.	"Every Sweet Day"	Lee Seung-min	Choi Gap-won	Han Sang-won	3:29
6.	"Lost Child" (instrumental)		Min Woong-shik, Lee Jong-hoon	Lee Jong-hoon	3:42
Total length:					21:45

== Charts ==
Chart (2012)	Peak position
South Korean Albums (Gaon)	22

== Awards and nominations ==
Year	Award	Category	Recipient	Result
2008	Ministry of Culture, Sports and Tourism Award	Power Rookie Award	IU	Won
