= A Flower Bookmark 2 =

2017 extended play by IU

EP by IU
- Released: September 22, 2017
- Recorded: 2017
- Genres: Folk; nu-disco
- Length: 25:08
- Language: Korean
- Labels: LOEN; Fave

IU chronology
Palette (2017)	A Flower Bookmark 2 (2017)	Love Poem (2019)

Singles from A Flower Bookmark 2
- 1. "Autumn Morning" Released: September 18, 2017; 2. "Sleepless Rainy Night" Released: September 22, 2017

A Flower Bookmark 2 (Korean: 꽃갈피둘; RR: Kkotgalpi dul) is the second cover extended play by South Korean singer-songwriter IU. It is also her sixth Korean-language extended play. The EP was released on September 22, 2017, by LOEN Entertainment under its imprint Fave Entertainment. Like her previous cover album, A Flower Bookmark features cover versions of nostalgic K-pop songs popularized from the 1960s to the 2000s.

== Background and release ==
A Flower Bookmark 2 consists of cover versions of nostalgic K-pop songs popularized from the 1960s to the 2000s, including "Autumn Morning" (Yang Hee-eun, 1991), "Last Night Story" (Sobangcha, 1988), "Sleepless Rainy Night" (Kim Gun-mo, 1990), "Secret Garden" (Lee Tzsche, 2003), "By the Stream" (Jeong Mi-jo, 1972) and "Everyday with You" (Deulgukhwa, 1980s). It was reported that IU personally approached the artists directly to ask for permission to remake their songs.

On September 18, 2017, "Autumn Morning" was released to coincide with the singer's ninth anniversary. The rest of the tracks were digitally released four days later, along with a music video of "Last Night Story" and a special performance clip of "Sleepless Rainy Night". The physical release of the album was scheduled to be September 25, but was postponed to October 12 because the remake album was originally going to include "With the Heart to Forget You" by the late singer Kim Kwang-seok. However, due to the recent revelations surrounding his daughter's death, FAVE decided to remove the track from IU's album. On January 6, 2018, IU unveiled a music video for the song, describing it as a tribute to the late singer Kim Kwang-seok. She shared, "As a loving fan of his music, I'd like to express my respect and memory to Kim Kwang-seok with this beautiful song sung with all my sincerity."

== Reception ==
=== Commercial reception ===
"Autumn Morning" achieved a perfect all-kill status two days after its release. The song also peaked at number one on the Gaon Digital Chart.

=== Critical reception ===
Professional ratings
Review scores
Source	Rating
IZM	2.5/5 stars

The Korea Herald said that the album lacked raw emotions, and IU's voice failed to bear the weight and complicated emotions of the originals. Billboard's review of the album was positive, explaining that "IU's latest features six cover songs that takes the vocalist’s sound into bygone decades, delving into genres like folk and nu-disco to prove her worth as one of South Korea’s most formidable songstresses." The 405 says that "isn't content to just mimic her childhood favorites, these are classic Korean songs completely re-imagined and recreated to into something undeniably 'IU'."

== Track listing ==
A Flower Bookmark 2 track listing
No.	Title	Lyrics	Music	Arrangement	Length
1.	"Autumn Morning" (가을 아침; Ga-eul achim)	Lee Byung-woo	Lee Byung-woo	Jung Sungha	3:38
2.	"Secret Garden" (비밀의 화원; Bimirui hwawon)	Lee Sang-eun	Lee Sang-eun	Kang Echae	3:45
3.	"Sleepless Rainy Night" (잠 못 드는 밤 비는 내리고; Jam mot deuneun bam bineun naerigo)	Kim Chang-wan; Park Kwang-hyun	Kim Chang-wan; Park Kwang-hyun	Hong So-jin; Jukjae	4:27
4.	"Last Night Story" (어젯밤 이야기; Eojetbam iyagi)	Park Gun-ho	Lee Ho-jun	Lim Hyun-jae; Kim Sung-mo	3:54
5.	"By the Stream" (개여울; Gaeyeo-ul)	Kim So-wol	Lee Hee-mok	Jung Jae-il	5:38
6.	"Everyday with You" (매일 그대와; Mae-il geudaewa)	Choi Sung-won	Choi Sung-won	Go Tae-young	3:45
Total length:					25:08

== Charts ==
=== Weekly charts ===
Chart (2017)	Peak position
South Korean Albums (Gaon)	3
US World Albums (Billboard)	5

=== Year-end charts ===
Chart (2017)	Position
South Korea (Gaon)	68

== Single charts ==
=== Weekly charts ===
"Autumn Morning"
Chart (2017)	Peak position
South Korea (Gaon)	1

"Sleepless Rainy Night"
Chart (2017)	Peak position
South Korea (Gaon)	4

=== Year-end charts ===
"Autumn Morning"
Chart (2017)	Position
South Korea (Gaon)	47

== Sales ==
Region	Sales
South Korea (Gaon)	79,532
