= Autumn Morning =

"Autumn Morning (가을 아침)"

Single by IU

from the album A Flower Bookmark 2
- Released: September 18, 2017
- Genre: Folk
- Length: 3:38
- Label: Fave Entertainment
- Songwriter: Lee Byung-woo
- Producer: Jung Sung-ha

IU singles chronology
"Dear Name" (2017)	"Autumn Morning (가을 아침)" (2017)	"Sleepless Rainy Night" (2017)

"Autumn Morning" (Korean: 가을 아침; RR: Gaeul Achim) is a Korean-language song recorded by South Korean singer IU for her ninth EP A Flower Bookmark 2 (2017). The track is a remake of Korean folk singer Yang Hee-eun's hit track released in 1991. The song was released on September 18, 2017, as a pre-release track from her second remake album.

"Autumn Morning" was a commercial success in South Korea, topping all the major music sites. The song debuted at number one on the Gaon Digital Chart, becoming IU's 17th number one single in the country.

The song was released four days before IU's upcoming A Flower Bookmark 2 album, to coincide with the singer's ninth anniversary in the industry.

== Release ==
On September 17 episode of Hyori's Homestay, a short clip of "Autumn Morning" was played as the background music. At midnight of September 18, IU uploaded the cover of the song into her Instagram account informing the fans to wait for a present at 7 in the morning. The song was released on Monday, September 18, 2017 at 7am KST.

== Composition ==
"Autumn Morning" is a minimalistic folksy song that starts a capella style, remaining this way for a full minute before a guitar comes in, steady and straightforward. The track features IU's soft vocals predominantly unaccompanied. The track is a cover of the original song by Korean folk singer Yang Hee-eun and guitarist Lee Byung-woo released in 1991. The singer also collaborated with guitarist Jung Sung-ha and folk musician Hareem to add soothing guitar and tin whistle elements to the middle third of her update of the track.

Lyrically, the song is about a person reminiscing a casual and trivial autumn morning.

== Chart performance ==
The song shot to the top of the Instiz iChart upon release, and eventually achieved a Perfect All-Kill two days after its release, as the single hit Number 1 on all of the major South Korean music sites simultaneously. "Autumn Morning" is her eleventh career Perfect All-Kill (IU has since extended this number to 12 Perfect All-Kills). Upon its week of release, the song debuted at number one on the Gaon Digital Chart for the 38th charting week of the year - September 17 to September 23, becoming IU's 17th number one in the chart; a number which has since risen to 18 as of December, 2017. On September 28, it was declared that the single achieved a "Triple Crown" for taking Number 1 on the Gaon Combined Digital Chart, Online Download Chart and Online Streaming Chart.

On the week of release, the song sold 379,326 downloads according to Gaon breaking the record for "the most number of downloads in a single week" in 2017 which was previously held by Knock Knock. The song also topped September's monthly Download Chart with 524,389 downloads sold. "Autumn Morning" also pulled massive streaming numbers, being streamed 9,082,798 times during its first week of release, topping the streaming chart. The song stayed at the top of the streaming chart for a second week, being streamed 7,751,411 times during this week.

The track also debuted at number one on both Gaon's Mobile and Background Music charts, solidifying the song's omnipresence in the industry.

== Live performances ==
IU sang the song at an award show for the first time at 32nd Golden Disc Awards in 2018, alongside her performance of her hit songs "Through the Night" and "Can't Love You Anymore".

IU has also presented the song at her 2017 concert tour "Palette" alongside other songs from her A Flower Bookmark 2 album.

== Charts ==
Chart (2017)	Peak position
South Korea (Gaon)	1

=== Year-end charts ===
Chart (2017)	Position
South Korea (Gaon)	47

== Sales ==
Country	Downloads	Streaming
South Korean	2,500,000+ (Note: South Korean sales figures for 'Autumn Morning' as of June 2019.)	100,000,000 (Note: South Korean streaming figures for 'Autumn Morning' as of December 2021.)
