= Growing Up (IU album) =

Studio album by IU
- Released: April 23, 2009
- Recorded: 2008–2009
- Studio: LOEN Studio (Seoul); Booming Studio (Seoul); Vitamin Studio (Seoul); Knuckles Korea Studio (Seoul)
- Genre: K-pop
- Length: 56:21
- Label: LOEN
- Producer: Choi Gap-won

IU chronology
Lost and Found (2008)	Growing Up (2009)	IU...IM (2009)

Singles from Growing Up
- 1. "Boo" Released: April 23, 2009; 2. "You Know (Rock ver.)" Released: June 30, 2009

Growing Up is the debut studio album by South Korean singer-songwriter IU. It was released on April 23, 2009, as a follow-up to her 2008 debut mini-album Lost and Found. Two of the album's 16 tracks, "Boo" and "You Know (있잖아) (Rock Ver.)", were released as singles.

== Background ==
Growing Up consists of 16 tracks. The album's title track "Boo" is composed by Han Sang-won, who is best known for his melodies in songs "On days when I miss you" by Park Ji-hun of V.O.S., and "Don't go, don't go, don't go" by Wanted. "Boo" is about a "charming friend of the opposite gender"; the lyrics tell the story of a haughty girl who does not care for the men around her. She falls in love with a boy to whom she had never given much thought. The follow-up song from the album, "You Know (Rock Ver.)", is the rock version of IU's song "You Know", which was more popular than the original version. The song portrays a young girl as she candidly expresses her feelings to the person with whom she is infatuated.

== Music videos ==
On May 16, 2011, the music videos for "Boo" and "You Know (있잖아) (Rock ver.)" were released through Loen Entertainment's official YouTube channel.

== Promotion ==
On April 23, 2009, IU began her first week of promotions through KBS's Music Bank. IU chose "Hey (있잖아) (Rock version)" as her follow-up single and performed it on various music programs after promotions for "Boo" had finished.

== Track listing ==
Growing Up track listing
No.	Title	Lyrics	Music	Arrangement	Length
1.	"Looking at You" (바라보기; Barabogi)	Choi Gap-won	PJ	PJ	3:23
2.	"Boo"	Han Sang-won, Choi Gap-won	Han Sang-won	Han Sang-won, Yoon Young-min	3:23
3.	"Pitiful" (가여워; Gayeowo)	Choi Gap-won	PJ, Choi Gap-won	PJ	3:20
4.	"A Dreamer (Note: Features uncredited rapping by Korean rapper Bizniz)"	Choi Gap-won	Kim Jin-hoon	Kim Jin-hoon	4:15
5.	"Every Sweet Day"	Lee Seung-min, Choi Gap-won	Han Sang-won	Han Sang-won	3:29
6.	"Lost Child" (미아; Mia)	Choi Gap-won	Min Woong-shik, Lee Jong-hoon	Lee Jong-hoon	3:42
7.	"Four Without Me" (나 말고 넷; Na Malgo Net)	Choi Gap-won	PJ, Kim Young-hwan	PJ	3:10
8.	"You Know (Note: Alternatively titled "Well..." and "Hey")" (featuring Mario) (있잖 아; Itjana)	Choi Gap-won, Seo Jung-jin	Seo Jung-jin, Kim Se-jin	Choi Gap-won	3:21
9.	"Graduation Day" (졸업하는 날; Joreophaneun Nal)	Choi Gap-won	Lee Jong-hoon	Lee Jong-hoon	3:44
10.	"Feel So Good"	Choi Gap-won	PJ	PJ	4:03
11.	"Ugly Duckling" (미운 오리; Miun Ori)	Choi Gap-won	PJ	PJ, Kim Young-hwan	3:28
12.	"Face to Face (After Looking at You)" (마주보기 (바라보기 그 후); Majubogi (Barabogi Geu Hu))	Choi Gap-won	PJ	PJ	3:23
13.	"Lost Child" (acoustic version) (미아 Mia)	Choi Gap-won	Min Woong-shik, Lee Jong-hoon	Min Woong-shik, Lee Jong-hoon	3:47
14.	"You Know (Note: Alternatively titled "Well... (Rock Ver.)" and "Hey (Rock Ver.)")" (rock version) (있잖 아 Itjana)	Choi Gap-won, Seo Jung-jin	Seo Jung-jin, Kim Se-jin	Seo Jung-jin, Kim Se-jin	3:10
15.	"Boo" (instrumental)		Han Sang-won	Han Sang-won, Yoon Young-min	3:23
16.	"Pitiful" (instrumental) (가여워; Gayeowo)		PJ, Choi Gap-won	PJ	3:20
Total length:					56:21

== Charts ==
Chart performance for Growing Up
Chart (2012)	Peak position
South Korean Albums (Gaon)	6
