= Gallup Korea's Singer of the Year =

Gallup Korea's Singer of the Year (Korean: 한국갤럽 올해를 빛낸 가수 1위) is selected annually through multiple public surveys conducted across South Korea by Gallup Korea. From 2020, survey is conducted in two categories on the basis of respondents' age group: 13–39, and 40 and above.

== List of recipients ==
=== 2007 ===
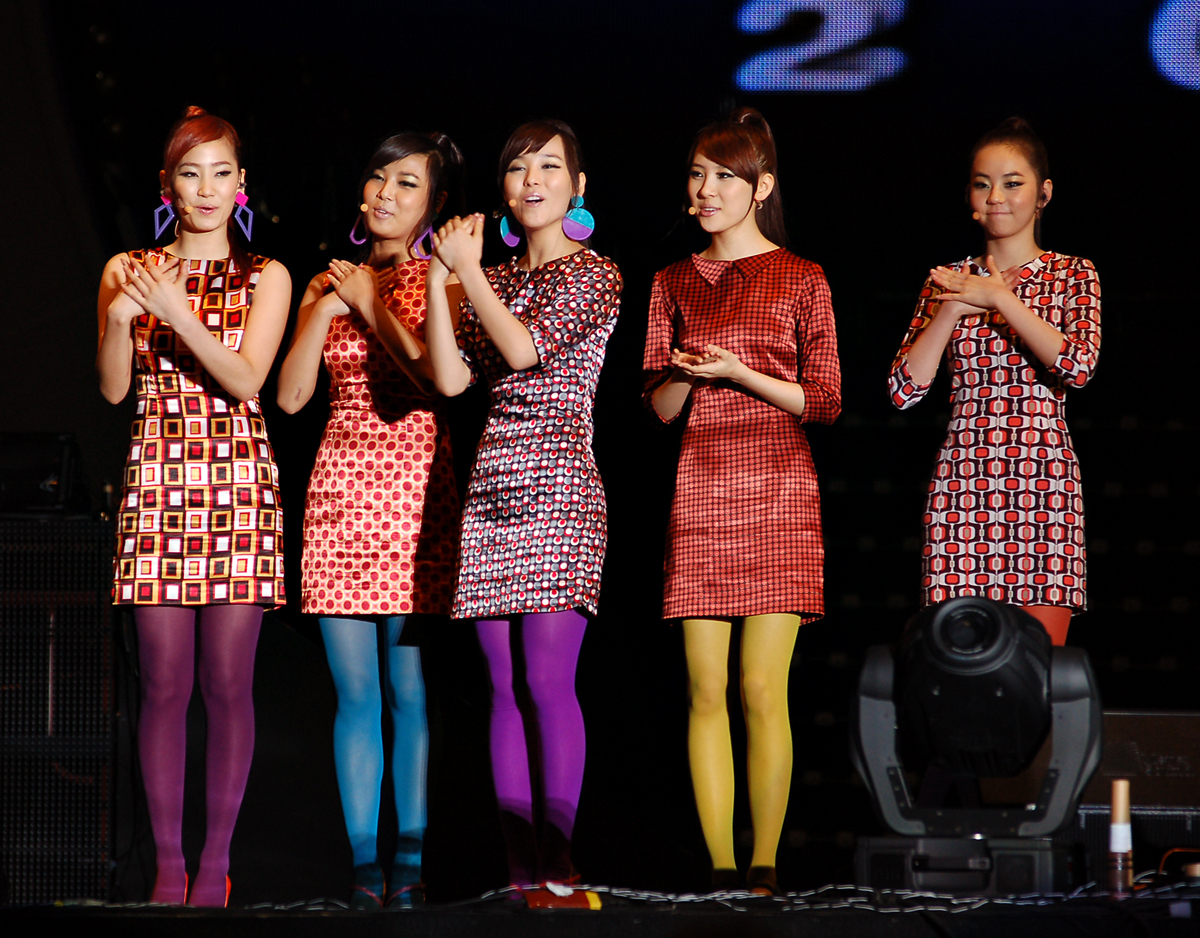
Wonder Girls (2007–08)

Survey period: December 5–16, 2007

Rank	Name	%
1st	Wonder Girls	28.2
2nd	BigBang	16.8
3rd	Jang Yoon-jeong	11.0
4th	Girls' Generation	9.9
5th	SG Wannabe	9.8

=== 2008 ===
Survey period: December 5–16, 2007

Rank	Name	%
1st	Wonder Girls	22.2
2nd	BigBang	21.2
3rd	Jang Yoon-jeong	9.9
4th	Girls' Generation	7.8
5th	Lee Hyori	6.5

=== 2009 ===
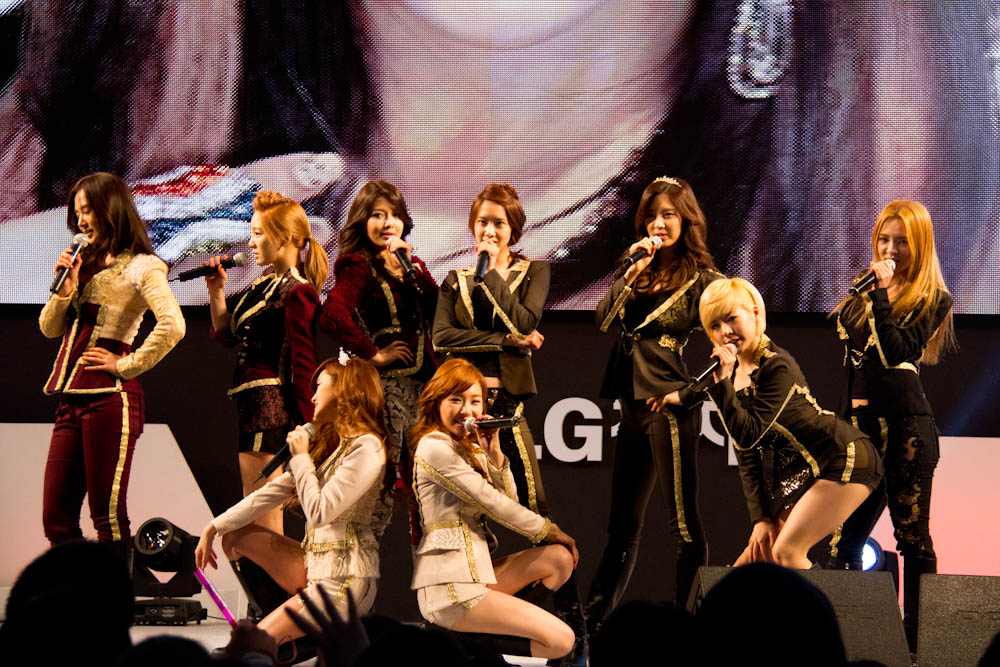
Girls' Generation performing "The Boys" at the 2012 LG Cinema 3D World Festival

Survey period: 2009

Rank	Name	%
1	Girls' Generation	29.8
2	BigBang	21.1
3	2PM	12.5
4	Wonder Girls	10.4
5	Jang Yoon-jeong	9.6

=== 2010 ===
Survey period: 2010

Rank	Name	%
1	Girls' Generation	31.5
2	2PM	12.5
3	Jang Yoon-jeong	11.6
4	Tae Jin-ah	8.4
5	Kara	7.7

=== 2011 ===
Survey period: 2011

2011
Rank	Name	%
1	Girls' Generation	26.1
2	BigBang	12.5
3	Jang Yoon-jeong	6.9
4	Kim Bum-soo	6.3
5	IU	6.0

=== 2012 ===
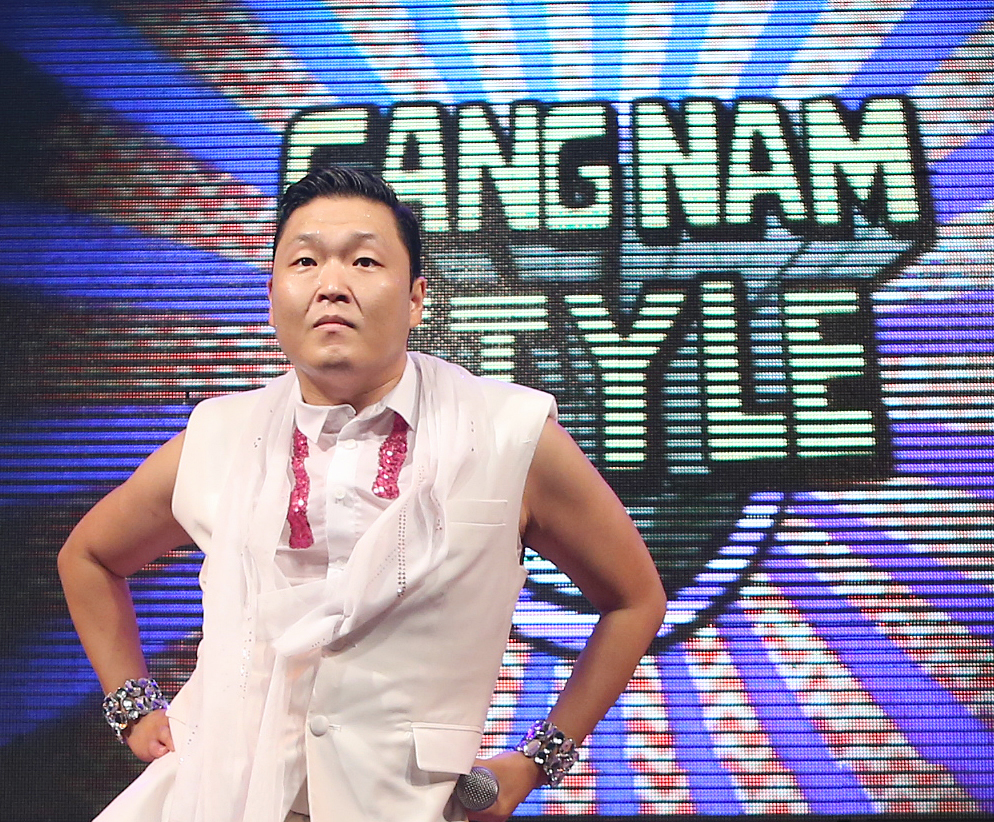
Psy with the Gangnam Style logo

Survey Period: 2012

2012
Rank	Name	%
1	Psy	24.4
2	Girls' Generation	19.8
3	BigBang	9.5
4	IU	6.9
5	Jang Yoon-jeong	6.6

=== 2013 ===
Survey period: 2013

2013
Rank	Name	%
1	Cho Yong-pil	17.6%
2	Psy	12.5
3	Jang Yoon-jeong	8.8
4	EXO	8.4
5	Girls' Generation	8.3

=== 2014 ===
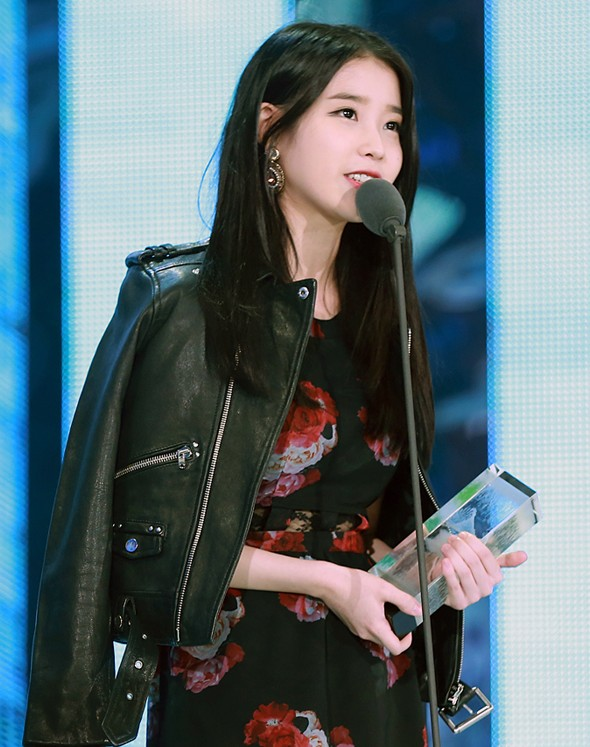
IU at the 2014 Melon Music Awards

Survey period: 2014

2014
Rank	Name	%
1	IU	12.9
2	Girls' Generation	12.4
3	Sistar	10.8
4	Exo	9.4
5	Lee Sun-hee	8.4

=== 2015 ===
Survey period: 2015

2015
Rank	Name	%
1	BigBang	15.5
2	IU	15.4
3	Girls' Generation	11.9
4	Jang Yoon-jeong	8.9
5	Sistar	6.9

=== 2016 ===
Survey period: 2016

2016
Rank	Name	%
1	Im Chang-jung	11.8
2	Twice	9.9
3	Jang Yoon-jeong	8.9
4	Exo	7.7
5	Girls' Generation	6.9

=== 2017 ===
Survey period: 2017

2017
Rank	Name	%
1	IU	15.2
2	Twice	9.1
3	Jang Yoon-jeong	8.9
4	BTS	8.5
5	Yoon Jong-shin	7.3

=== 2018 ===
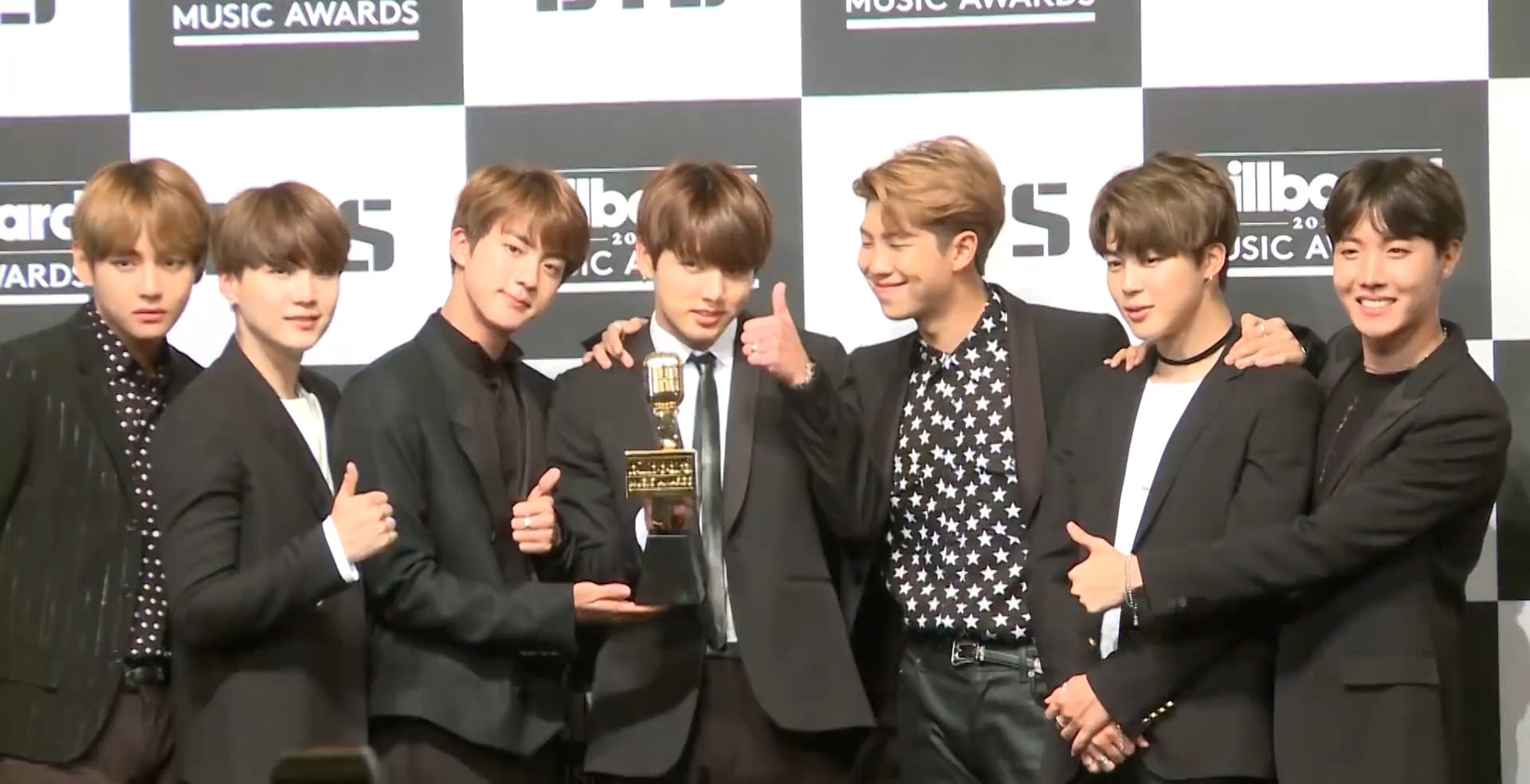
BTS at their press conference in Seoul, South Korea after winning Top Social Artist at the 24th Billboard Music Awards on May 29, 2017

Survey period: 2018

2018
Rank	Name	%
1	BTS	24.4
2	Twice	11.0
3	IU	10.2
2	Hong Jin-young	8.8
3	Wanna One	8.2

=== 2019 ===
Survey period: 2019

2019
Rank	Name	%
1	BTS	26.3
2	Song Ga-in	18.5
3	Jang Yoon-jeong	11.6
4	IU	11.5
2	Hong Jin-young	8.4

=== 2020 ===
Survey period: 2020

2020
Rank	Under 30s		40s and above	
Rank	Name	%	Name	%
1	BTS	39.2	Lim Young-woong	36.9
2	IU	21.1	Young Tak	27.3
3	Blackpink	13.6	Na Hoon-a	17.2
4	Lim Young-woong	10.8	Jang Yoon-jeong	12.8
5	Twice	7.8	Jinseong	12.1

=== 2021 ===
Survey period: 2021

2021
Rank	Under 30s		40s and above	
Rank	Name	%	Name	%
1	BTS	45.6	Lim Young-woong	36.3
2	IU	32.1	Young Tak	18.9
3	Blackpink	10.4	Na Hoon-a	13.5
4	Lee Moo-jin	9.2	Jang Yoon-jeong	11.7
5	Lim Young-woong	7.0	BTS	10.2

=== 2022 ===
Survey period: 2022

2022
Rank	Under 30s		40s and above	
Rank	Name	%	Name	%
1	BTS	29.4	Lim Young-woong	33.0
2	IU	26.6	Jang Yoon-jeong	17.2
3	Blackpink	16.6	Young Tak	12.4
4	Ive	13.0	Song Ga-in	10.4
4	Ive	13.0	Lee Chan-won	10.4
5	Lim Young-woong	6.5		
5	New Jeans	6.5		

=== 2023 ===
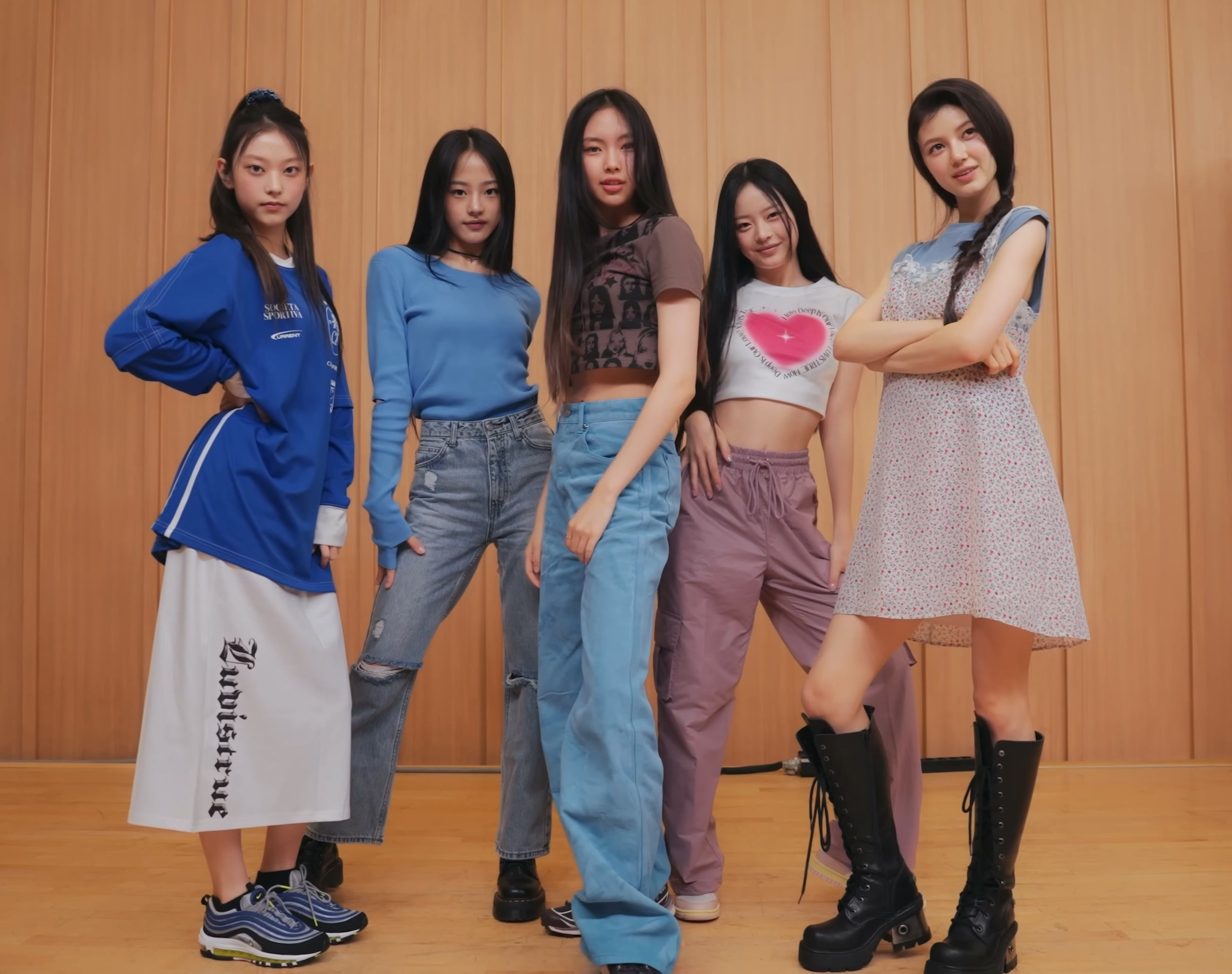
NewJeans in August 2022

Survey period: 2023

2023
Rank	Under 30s		40s and above	
Rank	Name	%	Name	%
1	New Jeans	25.7	Lim Young-woong	37.8
2	BTS	18.3	Jang Yoon-jeong	12.7
3	Ive	17.0	Young Tak	11.8
4	IU	16.1	Lee Chan-won	11.3
4	Blackpink	16.1	Lee Chan-won	11.3
5	Lim Young-woong	12.7	Na Hoon-a	9.5

=== 2024 ===
Survey period: 2024

2024
Rank	Under 30s		40s and above	
Rank	Name	%	Name	%
1	New Jeans	25.5	Lim Young-woong	33.9
2	IU	18.3	Lee Chan-won	12.7
3	Aespa	17.0	Jang Yoon-jeong	11.8
4	BTS	16.1	Young Tak	11.3
5	Ive	12.7	Na Hoon-a	9.5

=== 2025 ===
Survey period: 2025

2025
Rank	Under 30s		40s and above	
Rank	Name	%	Name	%
1	IU	20.1	Lim Young-woong	29.1
2	Blackpink	18.1	Jang Yoon-jeong	12.3
3	Aespa	14.0	Lee Chan-won	12.0
4	Ive	12.2	Young Tak	9.1
5	New Jeans	12.0	Song Ga-in	7.9

== See also ==
- Gallup Korea's Actor of the Year
- Gallup Korea's Song of the Year
