= List of awards and nominations received by Rosé =

Rosé awards and nominations
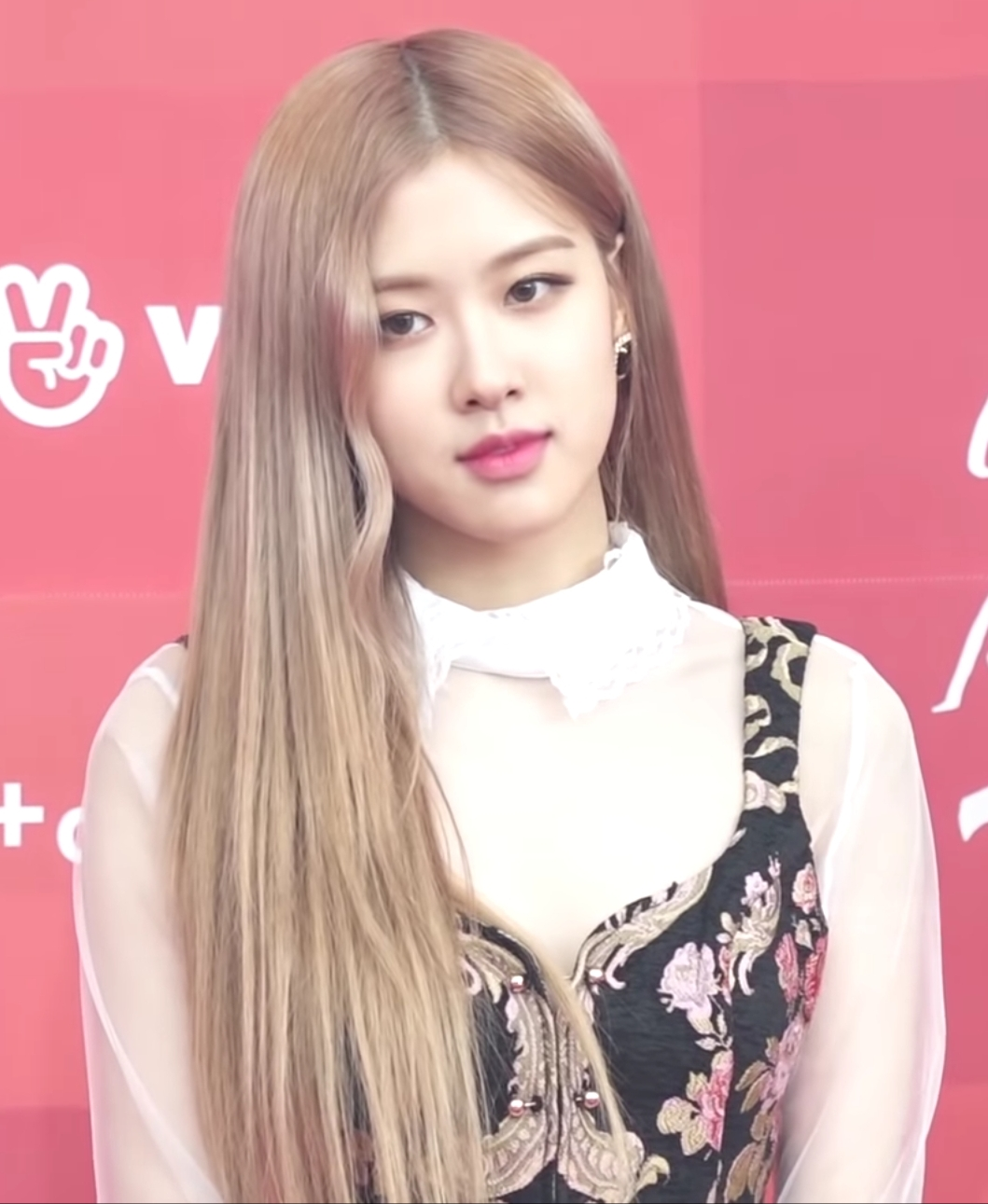
- Rosé at the 33rd Golden Disc Awards in January 2019
Awards and nominations
Award	Wins	Nominations
All Africa Music Awards	0	1
American Music Awards	0	2
APRA Music Awards	0	3
ASCAP Pop Music Awards	1	1
Asia Artist Awards	1	5
Asia Star Entertainer Awards	0	2
Asian Pop Music Awards	9	17
Billboard Latin Music Awards	0	1
Brand of the Year Awards	1	2
BreakTudo Awards	1	2
Brit Awards	1	1
D Awards	0	2
The Fact Music Awards	0	1
Gaon Chart Music Awards	0	3
Golden Disc Awards	1	5
Grammy Awards	0	3
Hanteo Music Awards	2	17
Hito Music Awards	1	1
iHeartRadio Music Awards	2	6
Japan Gold Disc Awards	1	1
Joox Thailand Music Awards	0	1
K-World Dream Awards	1	1
KM Chart Awards	0	1
Korea First Brand Awards	2	4
Korea Grand Music Awards	0	2
Korean Music Awards	0	3
Los 40 Music Awards	0	1
MAMA Awards	6	13
Melon Music Awards	3	12
MTV Europe Music Awards	0	1
MTV MIAW Awards	0	1
MTV Video Music Awards	1	8
MTV Video Music Awards Japan	1	2
Music Awards Japan	1	3
NetEase Cloud Music Awards	1	1
Nickelodeon Kids' Choice Awards	1	3
Nickelodeon Mexico Kids' Choice Awards	0	1
NRJ Music Awards	1	1
Philippine K-pop Awards	1	1
Premios Odeón	1	1
Rockbjörnen	0	1
RTHK International Pop Poll Awards	2	3
SEC Awards	1	5
Seoul Music Awards	2	12
Swiss Music Awards	1	1
Variety Hitmakers Awards	1	1
Webby Awards	1	1
Weibo Starlight Awards	1	1

Totals (Note: Certain award groups do not simply award one winner. They acknowledge several different recipients, have runners-up, and have third place. Since this is a specific recognition and is different from losing an award, runner-up mentions are considered wins in this award tally. For simplification and to avoid errors, each award in this list has been presumed to have had a prior nomination.)
- Wins: 50
- Nominations: 159

Rosé is a New Zealand and South Korean singer and songwriter and a member of the South Korean girl group Blackpink. She released her debut solo single "On the Ground" in March 2021, which broke two Guinness World Records as the most viewed YouTube music video in 24 hours by a solo K-pop artist and for making her the first artist to reach number one on a Billboard Global chart as a soloist and as part of a group. The song was awarded Best Dance Performance Solo at the 2021 Mnet Asian Music Awards and received nominations for Song of the Year at that ceremony and the 2021 Melon Music Awards and the Best Digital Song bonsang (Note: A bonsang (Korean: 본상), which translates to "main prize", is a major award given at a South Korean award ceremony to multiple artists.) at the 36th Golden Disc Awards. Rosé was listed on Variety's Power of Young Hollywood Impact Report in 2022 and Rolling Stone Australia / New Zealand's 50 Living Icons from Australia and Aotearoa in 2023.

"APT.", a collaboration with Bruno Mars and the lead single from Rosé's debut studio album Rosie (2024), earned the Brit Award for International Song of the Year, making her the first K-pop artist in history to win at the award ceremony. It also garnered the singer an MTV Video Music Award for Song of the Year and a daesang (Note: A daesang (Korean: 대상), which translates to "grand prize", is the highest honour given out at South Korean music award ceremonies in recognition of the artist(s) with the greatest physical and digital achievements for the year.) for the same category at the 9th Asia Artist Awards and 2025 MAMA Awards. It received three nominations at the 68th Annual Grammy Awards including Record of the Year and Song of the Year, for which Rosé won two Guinness World Records as the first K-pop act to be nominated in those categories. "APT." also earned Rosé three further Guinness World Records as the first K-pop artist to reach No. 1 on Apple Music's Global chart, the first female K-pop artist to enter the Billboard Radio Songs top 10, and for achieving the fastest K-pop track to reach 1 billion streams on Spotify. With the album Rosie, she earned another Guinness World Record for the highest-charting female K-pop artist on the US albums chart, peaking at number three on the Billboard 200. The album won Millions Top 10 at the 2025 Melon Music Awards, where Rosé was also awarded Best Female Solo and Top 10 Artists. She was ranked among Time's 100 most influential people in the world and Forbes's Korea Power Celebrity 40 in 2025-2026. She received a Presidential Commendation award at the 2025 Korean Popular Culture and Arts Awards and was inducted into the Asian Hall of Fame in 2026.

== Awards and nominations ==
Name of the award ceremony, year presented, category, nominee(s) of the award, and the result of the nomination
Award ceremony	Year	Category	Nominee(s)/work(s)	Result	Ref.
All Africa Music Awards	2026	Best Global Act	Rosé	Nominated	
American Music Awards	2025	Collaboration of the Year	"APT." (with Bruno Mars)	Nominated	
American Music Awards	2025	Favorite K-Pop Artist	Rosé	Nominated	
APRA Music Awards	2026	Most Performed Australian Work	"Stay a Little Longer"	Nominated	
APRA Music Awards	2026	Most Performed Pop Work	"Stay a Little Longer"	Nominated	
APRA Music Awards	2026	Most Performed International Work	"APT." (with Bruno Mars)	Nominated	
ASCAP Pop Music Awards	2026	Most-Performed Songs of 2025	"APT." (with Bruno Mars)	Won	
Asia Artist Awards	2023	Popularity Award – Singer (Female)	Rosé	Nominated	
Asia Artist Awards	2024	Song of the Year	"APT." (with Bruno Mars)	Won	
Asia Artist Awards	2024	Popularity Award – Singer (Female)	Rosé	Nominated	
Asia Artist Awards	2025	Popularity Award – Solo (Female)	Rosé	Nominated	
Asia Artist Awards	2026	Popularity Award – Solo (Female)	Rosé	Pending	
Asia Star Entertainer Awards	2025	The Best Solo (Female)	Rosé	Nominated	
Asia Star Entertainer Awards	2026	The Best Solo (Female)	Rosé	Nominated	
Asian Pop Music Awards	2021	Best Music Video (Overseas)	"On the Ground"	Won	
Asian Pop Music Awards	2021	Top 20 Songs of the Year (Overseas)	"On the Ground"	Won	
Asian Pop Music Awards	2021	Top 20 Albums of the Year (Overseas)	R	Won	
Asian Pop Music Awards	2021	People's Choice Award (Overseas)	R	2nd place	
Asian Pop Music Awards	2021	Best Female Artist (Overseas)	Rosé	Nominated	
Asian Pop Music Awards	2021	Record of the Year (Overseas)	"On the Ground"	Nominated	
Asian Pop Music Awards	2024	Best Collaboration (Overseas)	"APT." (with Bruno Mars)	Won	
Asian Pop Music Awards	2024	Top 20 Songs of the Year (Overseas)	"APT." (with Bruno Mars)	Won	
Asian Pop Music Awards	2024	Song of the Year (Overseas)	"APT." (with Bruno Mars)	Nominated	
Asian Pop Music Awards	2025	Top 20 Songs of the Year	"Number One Girl"	Won	
Asian Pop Music Awards	2025	Top 20 Albums of the Year	Rosie	Won	
Asian Pop Music Awards	2025	People's Choice Award	Rosie	7th place	
Asian Pop Music Awards	2025	Best Album of the Year	Rosie	Nominated	
Asian Pop Music Awards	2025	Best Composer	"Number One Girl"	Nominated	
Asian Pop Music Awards	2025	Best Female Artist	Rosé	Nominated	
Asian Pop Music Awards	2025	Best Lyricist	"Toxic Till the End"	Nominated	
Asian Pop Music Awards	2025	Song of the Year	"Number One Girl"	Nominated	
Billboard Latin Music Awards	2025	Crossover Artist of the Year	Rosé	Nominated	
Brand of the Year Awards (Note: Established in 2003, the Brand of the Year Awards is an awards ceremony based on nationwide surveys hosted by the Korea Consumer Brand Committee and organised by the Korea Consumer Forum.)	2021	Female Solo Singer of the Year	Rosé	Nominated	
Brand of the Year Awards	2025	Female Solo Singer of the Year	Rosé	Won	
BreakTudo Awards	2021	International Revelation	Rosé	Won	
BreakTudo Awards	2025	International Hit of the Year	"APT." (with Bruno Mars)	Nominated	
Brit Awards	2026	International Song of the Year	"APT." (with Bruno Mars)	Won	
D Awards	2025	Best Girl Solo Popularity Award	Rosé	Nominated	
D Awards	2026	Upick Global Choice (Girl)	Rosé	Nominated	
The Fact Music Awards	2021	Fan N Star Choice Individual	Rosé	Nominated	
Gaon Chart Music Awards	2022	Artist of the Year – Digital Music (March)	"On the Ground"	Nominated	
Gaon Chart Music Awards	2022	Artist of the Year – Physical Album (2nd Quarter)	R	Nominated	
Gaon Chart Music Awards	2022	Mubeat Global Choice Award – Female	Rosé	Nominated	
Golden Disc Awards	2022	Best Digital Song (Bonsang)	"On the Ground"	Nominated	
Golden Disc Awards	2022	Most Popular Artist	Rosé	Nominated	
Golden Disc Awards	2026	Best Digital Song (Bonsang)	"Toxic Till the End"	Won	
Golden Disc Awards	2026	Song of the Year (Daesang)	"Toxic Till the End"	Nominated	
Golden Disc Awards	2026	Most Popular Artist (Female)	Rosé	Nominated	
Grammy Awards	2026	Best Pop Duo/Group Performance	"APT." (with Bruno Mars)	Nominated	
Grammy Awards	2026	Record of the Year	"APT." (with Bruno Mars)	Nominated	
Grammy Awards	2026	Song of the Year	"APT." (with Bruno Mars)	Nominated	
Hanteo Music Awards	2021	Artist Award – Female Solo	Rosé	Won	
Hanteo Music Awards	2025	Global Artist – South America	Rosé	Won	
Hanteo Music Awards	2025	Artist of the Year (Bonsang)	Rosé	Nominated	
Hanteo Music Awards	2025	Global Artist – Africa	Rosé	Nominated	
Hanteo Music Awards	2025	Global Artist – Asia	Rosé	Nominated	
Hanteo Music Awards	2025	Global Artist – Europe	Rosé	Nominated	
Hanteo Music Awards	2025	Global Artist – North America	Rosé	Nominated	
Hanteo Music Awards	2025	Global Artist – Oceania	Rosé	Nominated	
Hanteo Music Awards	2026	Best Popular Artist	Rosé	Nominated	
Hanteo Music Awards	2026	Global Popular Artist – Africa	Rosé	Nominated	
Hanteo Music Awards	2026	Global Popular Artist – Asia	Rosé	Nominated	
Hanteo Music Awards	2026	Global Popular Artist – Europe	Rosé	Nominated	
Hanteo Music Awards	2026	Global Popular Artist – North America	Rosé	Nominated	
Hanteo Music Awards	2026	Global Popular Artist – South America	Rosé	Nominated	
Hanteo Music Awards	2026	Global Popular Artist – Oceania	Rosé	Nominated	
Hanteo Music Awards	2026	Hanteo Top 10	Rosé	Nominated	
Hanteo Music Awards	2026	Special Award (OST)	"Messy"	Nominated	
Hito Music Awards	2025	Western Songs of the Year	"APT." (with Bruno Mars)	Won	
iHeartRadio Music Awards	2025	Best Music Video	"APT." (with Bruno Mars)	Nominated	
iHeartRadio Music Awards	2026	Best Collaboration	"APT." (with Bruno Mars)	Won	
iHeartRadio Music Awards	2026	K-pop Artist of the Year	Rosé	Won	
iHeartRadio Music Awards	2026	Best Music Video	"Toxic Till the End"	Nominated	
iHeartRadio Music Awards	2026	Favorite K-pop Collab	"On My Mind" (with Alex Warren)	Nominated	
iHeartRadio Music Awards	2026	K-pop Song of the Year	"APT." (with Bruno Mars)	Nominated	
Japan Gold Disc Awards	2025	Song of the Year by Streaming (Western)	"APT." (with Bruno Mars)	Won	
Joox Thailand Music Awards	2022	Korean Song of the Year	"On the Ground"	Nominated	
K-World Dream Awards	2025	Best Music Award	Rosé	Won	
KM Chart Awards (Note: Hosted by KM Chart and KM Chart World and organized by the KMA Organizing Committee and Upick, the KM Chart Awards is an awards ceremony to honor K-pop artists for their contributions to the global music scene over the previous year.)	2026	Best Popular Solo Female Award	Rosé	Nominated	
Korea First Brand Awards (Note: Hosted by the Korea Consumer Brand Committee and the Korea Consumer Forum, the Korea First Brand Awards bases its winners on a nationwide South Korean survey.)	2022	Best Female Solo Singer	Rosé	Nominated	
Korea First Brand Awards	2024	Best Female Solo Singer (Vietnam)	Rosé	Won	
Korea First Brand Awards	2025	Best Female Solo Singer (Vietnam)	Rosé	Won	
Korea First Brand Awards	2026	Best Female Solo Singer (Vietnam)	Rosé	Nominated	
Korea Grand Music Awards	2025	Fan Favorite Artist (Female)	Rosé	Nominated	
Korea Grand Music Awards	2025	Trend of the Year – K-pop Solo	Rosé	Nominated	
Korean Music Awards	2025	Best K-pop Song	"APT." (with Bruno Mars)	Nominated	
Korean Music Awards	2025	Musician of the Year	Rosé	Nominated	
Korean Music Awards	2025	Song of the Year	"APT." (with Bruno Mars)	Nominated	
Los 40 Music Awards	2025	Best International New Artist or Group	Rosé	Nominated	
MAMA Awards	2021	Best Dance Performance Solo	"On the Ground"	Won	
MAMA Awards	2021	Artist of the Year	Rosé	Nominated	
MAMA Awards	2021	Best Female Artist	Rosé	Nominated	
MAMA Awards	2021	Song of the Year	"On the Ground"	Nominated	
MAMA Awards	2021	TikTok Favorite Moment	Rosé	Nominated	
MAMA Awards	2021	Worldwide Fans' Choice Top 10	Rosé	Nominated	
MAMA Awards	2024	Global Sensation	Rosé and Bruno Mars	Won	
MAMA Awards	2025	Song of the Year	"APT." (with Bruno Mars)	Won	
MAMA Awards	2025	Best Collaboration	"APT." (with Bruno Mars)	Won	
MAMA Awards	2025	Best Female Artist	Rosé	Won	
MAMA Awards	2025	Best Vocal Performance Solo	"Toxic Till the End"	Won	
MAMA Awards	2025	Artist of the Year	Rosé	Nominated	
MAMA Awards	2025	Song of the Year	"Toxic Till the End"	Nominated	
Melon Music Awards	2021	Best Female Solo	Rosé	Nominated	
Melon Music Awards	2021	Netizen Popularity Award	Rosé	Nominated	
Melon Music Awards	2021	Song of the Year	"On the Ground"	Nominated	
Melon Music Awards	2021	Top 10 Artist	Rosé	Nominated	
Melon Music Awards	2025	Best Female Solo	Rosé	Won	
Melon Music Awards	2025	Millions Top 10	Rosie	Won	
Melon Music Awards	2025	Top 10 Artist	Rosé	Won	
Melon Music Awards	2025	Album of the Year	Rosie	Nominated	
Melon Music Awards	2025	Artist of the Year	Rosé	Nominated	
Melon Music Awards	2025	Berriz Global Fans' Choice	Rosé	Nominated	
Melon Music Awards	2025	Song of the Year	"Toxic Till the End"	Nominated	
Melon Music Awards	2026	Global Top 10	Rosé	Nominated	
MTV Europe Music Awards	2021	Best K-Pop	Rosé	Nominated	
MTV MIAW Awards	2021	K-Pop Dominion	Rosé	Nominated	
MTV Video Music Awards	2025	Song of the Year	"APT." (with Bruno Mars)	Won	
MTV Video Music Awards	2025	Best Art Direction	"APT." (with Bruno Mars)	Nominated	
MTV Video Music Awards	2025	Best Collaboration	"APT." (with Bruno Mars)	Nominated	
MTV Video Music Awards	2025	Best Direction	"APT." (with Bruno Mars)	Nominated	
MTV Video Music Awards	2025	Best K-Pop	"Toxic Till the End"	Nominated	
MTV Video Music Awards	2025	Best Pop	"APT." (with Bruno Mars)	Nominated	
MTV Video Music Awards	2025	Best Visual Effects	"APT." (with Bruno Mars)	Nominated	
MTV Video Music Awards	2025	Video of the Year	"APT." (with Bruno Mars)	Nominated	
MTV Video Music Awards Japan	2025	Best Collaboration Video (International)	"APT." (with Bruno Mars)	Won	
MTV Video Music Awards Japan	2025	Video of the Year	"APT." (with Bruno Mars)	Nominated	
Music Awards Japan	2025	Best International Pop Song in Japan	"APT." (with Bruno Mars)	Won	
Music Awards Japan	2025	Best of Listeners' Choice: International Song	"APT." (with Bruno Mars)	Nominated	
Music Awards Japan	2025	Song of the Year	"APT." (with Bruno Mars)	Nominated	
NetEase Cloud Music Awards	2024	Hot Collaborative Single of the Year	"APT." (with Bruno Mars)	Won	
Nickelodeon Kids' Choice Awards	2025	Favorite Female Breakout Artist	Rosé	Nominated	
Nickelodeon Kids' Choice Awards	2025	Favorite Music Collaboration	"APT." (with Bruno Mars)	Nominated	
Nickelodeon Kids' Choice Awards	2026	Favorite Female Artist	Rosé	Won	
Nickelodeon Mexico Kids' Choice Awards	2021	K-Pop Bomb	Rosé	Nominated	
NRJ Music Awards	2025	International Collab/Duo	"APT." (with Bruno Mars)	Won	
Philippine K-pop Awards	2024	Best Collaboration of the Year	"APT." (with Bruno Mars)	Won	
Premios Odeón	2026	Best International Song	"APT." (with Bruno Mars)	Won	
Rockbjörnen	2025	Foreign Song of the Year	"APT." (with Bruno Mars)	Nominated	
RTHK International Pop Poll Awards	2022	Top Ten International Gold Songs	"On the Ground"	Won	
RTHK International Pop Poll Awards	2022	Top Female Singers	Rosé	Nominated	
RTHK International Pop Poll Awards	2025	Top Ten International Gold Songs	"APT." (with Bruno Mars)	Won	
SEC Awards (Note: The SEC Awards, formerly known as the Séries em Cena Awards, is a Brazilian award show that honors achievements in music, film, television, and internet culture in Brazil and globally.)	2025	International Female Artist of the Year	Rosé	Won	
SEC Awards	2025	Asian Artist of the Year	Rosé	Nominated	
SEC Awards	2025	International Album/EP of the Year	Rosie	Nominated	
SEC Awards	2025	International Feat of the Year	"APT." (with Bruno Mars)	Nominated	
SEC Awards	2025	International Song of the Year	"APT." (with Bruno Mars)	Nominated	
Seoul Music Awards	2022	Main Award (Bonsang)	R	Nominated	
Seoul Music Awards	2022	Korean Wave Award	Rosé	Nominated	
Seoul Music Awards	2022	Popularity Award	Rosé	Nominated	
Seoul Music Awards	2025	Main Prize (Bonsang)	Rosé	Won	
Seoul Music Awards	2025	World Best Artist	Rosé	Won	
Seoul Music Awards	2025	Grand Prize (Daesang)	Rosé	Nominated	
Seoul Music Awards	2025	Ballad Award	"Number One Girl"	Nominated	
Seoul Music Awards	2025	K-pop World Choice – Solo	Rosé	Nominated	
Seoul Music Awards	2025	K-Wave Special Award	Rosé	Nominated	
Seoul Music Awards	2025	Popularity Award	Rosé	Nominated	
Seoul Music Awards	2026	K-pop World Choice – Solo	Rosé	Nominated	
Seoul Music Awards	2026	Korea Wave Award	Rosé	Nominated	
Swiss Music Awards	2026	Best Group International	Rosé and Bruno Mars	Won	
Variety Hitmakers Awards	2025	Global Hitmaker of the Year	Rosé	Won	
Webby Awards	2025	Arts & Entertainment, Social Video Short Form (Social)	APT. YouTube Shorts Challenge (with Bruno Mars)	Won	
Weibo Starlight Awards	2021	Starlight Hall of Fame (Korea)	Rosé	Won	

== Other accolades ==
=== State and cultural honours ===
Name of country, year given, and name of honour
Country	Year	Honour	Ref.
South Korea (Note: Awarded at the Korean Popular Culture and Arts Awards, organised by the Korea Creative Content Agency and hosted by the South Korean Ministry of Culture, Sports and Tourism. Honors are given to individuals or groups for their contribution to popular culture in South Korea and abroad.)	2025	Presidential Commendation	
South Korea	2026	Okgwan Order of Cultural Merit (4th Class)	
United Kingdom	2023	Member of the Most Excellent Order of the British Empire (MBE)	

=== Listicles ===
Name of publisher, year listed, name of listicle, and placement
Publisher	Year	Listicle	Placement	Ref.
Asian Hall of Fame	2026	Asian Hall of Fame: Class of 2026 (Note: Honored as a "K-Pop Icon".)	Inducted	
Billboard Korea	2024	K-Pop Artist 100	65th	
Billboard Korea	2025	K-Pop Artist 100	14th	
Complex	2026	The 25 Best Dressed K-Pop Stars of All Time, Ranked	11th	
Complex	2026	The Best Dressed Female K-Pop Stars of All Time, Ranked	5th	
Complex	2026	The 30 Best K-Pop Solo Artists Right Now, Ranked	6th	
Forbes Korea	2025	Power Celebrity 40	24th	
Forbes Korea	2025	K-Idol of the Year 30	2nd	
Forbes Korea	2026	Power Celebrity 40	23rd	
Gold House (Note: The A100 List honours the most impactful Asians and Asian American & Pacific Islanders (AAPIs) in culture every May for AAPI Heritage Month. Gold House "champions trailblazing members of the AAPI community and their transformative contributions to entertainment, fashion, lifestyle, technology, business, social activism and politics from the past year".)	2025	A100 Most Impactful Asians List	Placed	
Madame Tussauds	2025	Hot 100	Placed	
Rolling Stone Australia / New Zealand	2023	50 Living Icons: Australia and Aotearoa	Placed	
Rolling Stone Korea	2024	Star of the Year: Domestic	Placed	
Rolling Stone Korea	2025	Musician of the Year	Placed	
TC Candler	2025	The 100 Most Beautiful Faces	1st	
Time	2025	Time 100	Placed	
Variety	2022	Power of Young Hollywood Impact Report	Placed	

=== World records ===
Key
†	Indicates a formerly held world record (Note: Note that this does not indicate that Rosé lost the record, only that the listed record holder (i.e. a music video) was eventually surpassed.)

Name of record body, year the record was awarded, name of the record, and the name of the record holder
Publication	Year	World record	Record holder	Ref.
Guinness World Records	2021	First artist to reach number one on a Billboard Global chart as a soloist and as part of a group	"On the Ground"	
Guinness World Records	2021	† Most viewed YouTube music video in 24 hours by a solo K-pop artist (Note: With 41.6 million views on the first day of release, "On the Ground" broke the record held by Psy's "Gentleman" (2013) for the most viewed YouTube video in 24 hours by a solo K-pop artist on 12 March 2021.)	"On the Ground"	
Guinness World Records	2024	First K-pop artist to reach No.1 on Apple Music's Top 100: Global chart	"APT."	
Guinness World Records	2024	Highest-charting female K-pop artist on the US albums chart (Note: Rosie debuted at number three on the US Billboard 200 on 21 December 2024, surpassing the number seven peaks of Nayeon's Im Nayeon (2022) and Na (2024).)	Rosie	
Guinness World Records	2025	First female K-pop artist to enter the Billboard Radio Songs Top 10	"APT."	
Guinness World Records	2025	Fastest K-pop track to reach 1 billion streams on Spotify (Note: "APT." reached 1 billion streams on Spotify 100 days after its release on 26 January 2025.)	"APT."	
Guinness World Records	2025	First K-pop act to be Grammy-nominated for Record of the Year	"APT."	
Guinness World Records	2025	First K-pop act to be Grammy-nominated for Song of the Year	"APT."	

=== Streaming milestones ===
Name of the achievement, year presented, category, and work(s)
Achievement	Year	Category	Work(s)	Ref.
Spotify Billions Club	2025	Billions Club Plaque	"APT."	

== See also ==
- List of awards and nominations received by Blackpink
