= Rosé (singer) =

New Zealand and South Korean singer (born 1997)

Rosé MBE
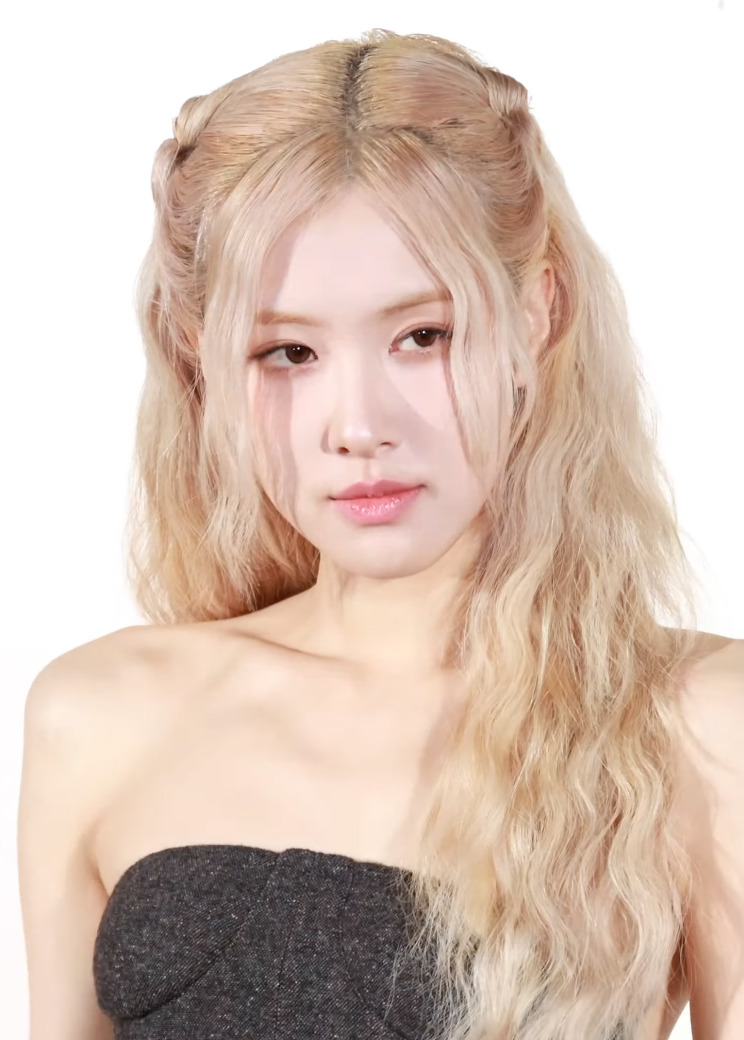
- Rosé in 2024
- Born: Roseanne Park; 11 February 1997 (age 29); Auckland, New Zealand
- Other name: Park Chae-young
- Citizenship: South Korea; New Zealand
- Occupation: Singer
- Years active: 2012; 2016–present
- Works: Discography (Note: For her work with Blackpink, see Blackpink discography, songs recorded, and videography.)
- Awards: Full list (Note: For her awards received as a member of Blackpink, see List of awards and nominations received by Blackpink.)
- Honours: Okgwan Order of Cultural Merit (2026)
- Musical career
- Origin: Seoul, South Korea
- Genres: Pop; pop-punk; K-pop
- Instrument: Vocals
- Labels: YG; Interscope; The Black Label; Atlantic
- Member of: Blackpink
- Website: rosesarerosie.com

Korean name
- Hangul: 박채영
- RR: Bak Chaeyeong
- MR: Pak Ch'aeyŏng

Stage name
- Hangul: 로제
- RR: Roje
- MR: Roje

Roseanne Park (born 11 February 1997), known mononymously as Rosé (Korean: 로제), is a New Zealand and South Korean singer. Born in New Zealand and raised in Australia, Rosé moved to South Korea and signed with label YG Entertainment following a successful audition in 2012. She rose to prominence as a member of the South Korean girl group Blackpink, which debuted in August 2016 and became one of the best-selling girl groups of all time.

In March 2021, Rosé released her debut single album R, which sold 448,089 copies in its first week, the highest figure by a Korean female soloist. Its lead single "On the Ground" topped the Billboard Global 200, making her the first artist to achieve this both as a soloist and as part of a group. It became the first song by a Korean female soloist to enter the UK Singles Chart and the most-viewed music video in the first 24 hours by a Korean solo artist on YouTube. In 2024, she signed with The Black Label and Atlantic Records and released "APT." with Bruno Mars as the lead single from her debut studio album Rosie (2024). The best-selling global single of 2025, "APT." topped charts in numerous countries including South Korea and Australia, where she became the first Korean female soloist to reach the summit. In the US and UK, Rosé earned the first song by a Korean female soloist to enter the top three with "APT." and the highest-charting album by a Korean female soloist with Rosie.

Rosé's accolades include a Brit Award, eight Guinness World Records, six MAMA Awards, three Melon Music Awards, a Golden Disc Award, and an MTV Video Music Award; she became the first Korean artist to win a Brit Award and the first to win Song of the Year at the MTV Video Music Awards. She received three Grammy Award nominations including Record of the Year and Song of the Year, becoming the first Korean artist to be nominated for one of the Big Four categories as a lead artist. Rosé has appeared on Time's list of the 100 most influential people in the world (2025) and on the Forbes Korea Power Celebrity 40 (2025–2026). She received a South Korean Presidential Commendation in 2025 for her contribution to popular culture in South Korea and abroad, and was inducted into the Asian Hall of Fame in 2026. In addition, to being the second-most followed Korean on Instagram, Rosé has been acknowledged for her influence in fashion as a global ambassador for Yves Saint Laurent and Tiffany & Co.

== Life and career ==
=== 1997–2012: Early life ===
Roseanne Park, Korean name Park Chae-young (박채영), was born on 11 February 1997 in Auckland, New Zealand, to South Korean immigrant parents, and has an older sister. In 2004, at the age of seven, Rosé and her family moved to Melbourne, Victoria, Australia, where she spent her childhood. She began singing and learned to play guitar and piano as a child and performed in church choirs. She attended Kew East Primary School in Kew East and Canterbury Girls' Secondary College in Canterbury, Victoria, a Melbourne suburb, but dropped out before year 11, after signing with South Korean record label YG Entertainment.

=== 2012–2015: Pre-debut ===
In 2012, Rosé attended an audition in Sydney for YG Entertainment, a South Korean company whose music she already liked. She went at her father's suggestion and came in first among the 700 participants. She had initially presumed her father's idea was a joke due to the distance and difficulty of becoming a singer overseas saying that "she didn't think that there was much of a chance to become a K-pop star [herself]". Two months later, she had signed with the label as a trainee, and moved to Seoul, South Korea.

In the same year, Rosé was featured on labelmate G-Dragon's song "Without You" from his extended play (EP) One of a Kind (2012). Her name was not publicised at the time of release; her credit was revealed only following her announcement as a member of Blackpink. The song peaked at number ten on South Korea's Gaon Music Chart and at number 15 on the Billboard Korea K-pop Hot 100.

=== 2016–2022: Debut with Blackpink and R ===
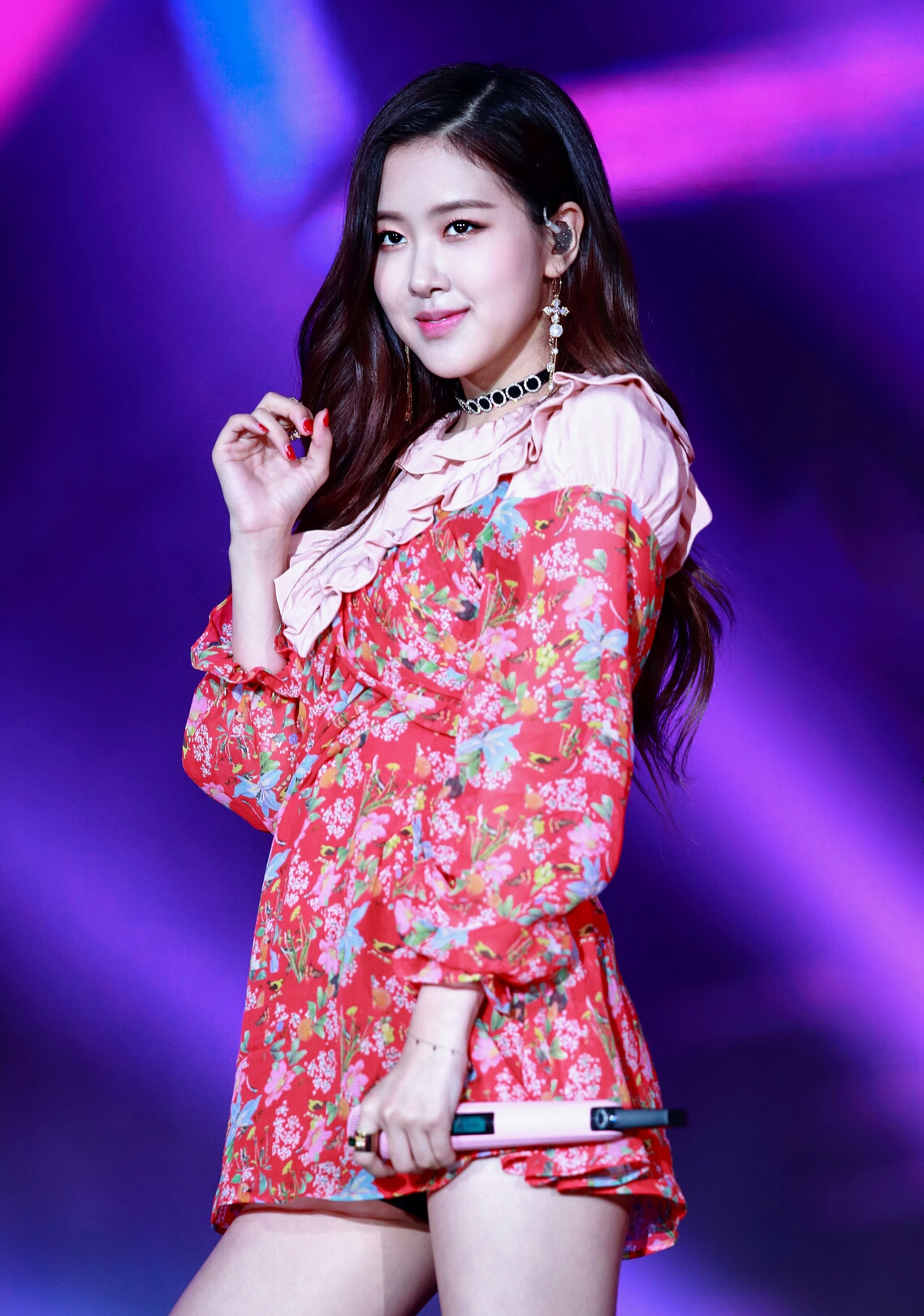
Rosé performing at the Korea Music Festival in October 2017

Rosé trained at YG Entertainment for four years before she was revealed as the final member of the girl group Blackpink on 22 June 2016. The group debuted on 8 August 2016 with the single album Square One, which featured the chart-topping single "Whistle" as well as the single "Boombayah". In 2018, Blackpink signed with Interscope Records in a global partnership with YG Entertainment.

Rosé appeared on various broadcast programs including King of Masked Singer. Her vocal performance on the show was met with a warm reception by the audience, to which Rosé commented that she "didn't know if the audience would like [her] singing" and that she felt "happy and relieved" at the positive result. She later appeared as a performer on the second season of Fantastic Duo. The show's production staff stated that her appearance was intended to "reveal Rosé's vocal appeal, which is different from Blackpink". On 1 June 2020, it was announced that Rosé would debut as a solo artist following the release of Blackpink's first Korean language full-length album. On 30 December 2020, in an interview with South Korean media outlet Osen, her label revealed that filming for her debut music video would begin in mid-January 2021. On 26 January 2021, a promotional teaser of Rosé's solo debut was released, revealing that a preview of her solo debut would be revealed through Blackpink Livestream Concert: The Show on 31 January 2021.

Rosé's debut single album, titled R, was released on 12 March 2021. The album set the record for the highest first-week sales by a Korean female soloist, with 448,089 copies sold. With 41.6 million views in 24 hours of the music video for the lead single "On the Ground", she broke the almost eight-year record held by former labelmate Psy's "Gentleman" for the most viewed music video by a Korean soloist in 24 hours. "On the Ground" also debuted and peaked at number one on both the Billboard Global 200 and Global Excl. U.S. charts, the first song by a Korean solo artist to top either chart in history. These accomplishments led Rosé to be awarded two Guinness World Records, for achieving the most-viewed YouTube music video in 24 hours by a solo K-pop artist as well as being the first artist to reach number one on a Billboard Global chart as a soloist and as part of a group.

"On the Ground" was a commercial success in South Korea, peaking at number four on the Gaon Digital Chart and number three on the Billboard K-pop Hot 100. It also peaked at number 70 on the Billboard Hot 100, becoming the highest-charting song by a female K-pop soloist and the second-highest by a K-pop soloist in the United States. In the United Kingdom, "On the Ground" became the first song by a female K-pop solo artist to enter the UK Singles Chart, with a debut at number 43. It debuted at number 35 on the Billboard Canadian Hot 100 and became the highest-charting hit by a Korean female soloist in Canada. On 24 March, Rosé received her first-ever music show win as a soloist for "On the Ground" on South Korean cable music program Show Champion, and went on to win five more for the single. On 5 April, the music video for the second single from R, "Gone", was released. The song also performed well in South Korea, peaking at number six on the Gaon Digital Chart and number five on the Billboard K-pop Hot 100. Globally, it peaked at number 29 on the Billboard Global 200 and number 17 on the Billboard Global Excl. U.S.

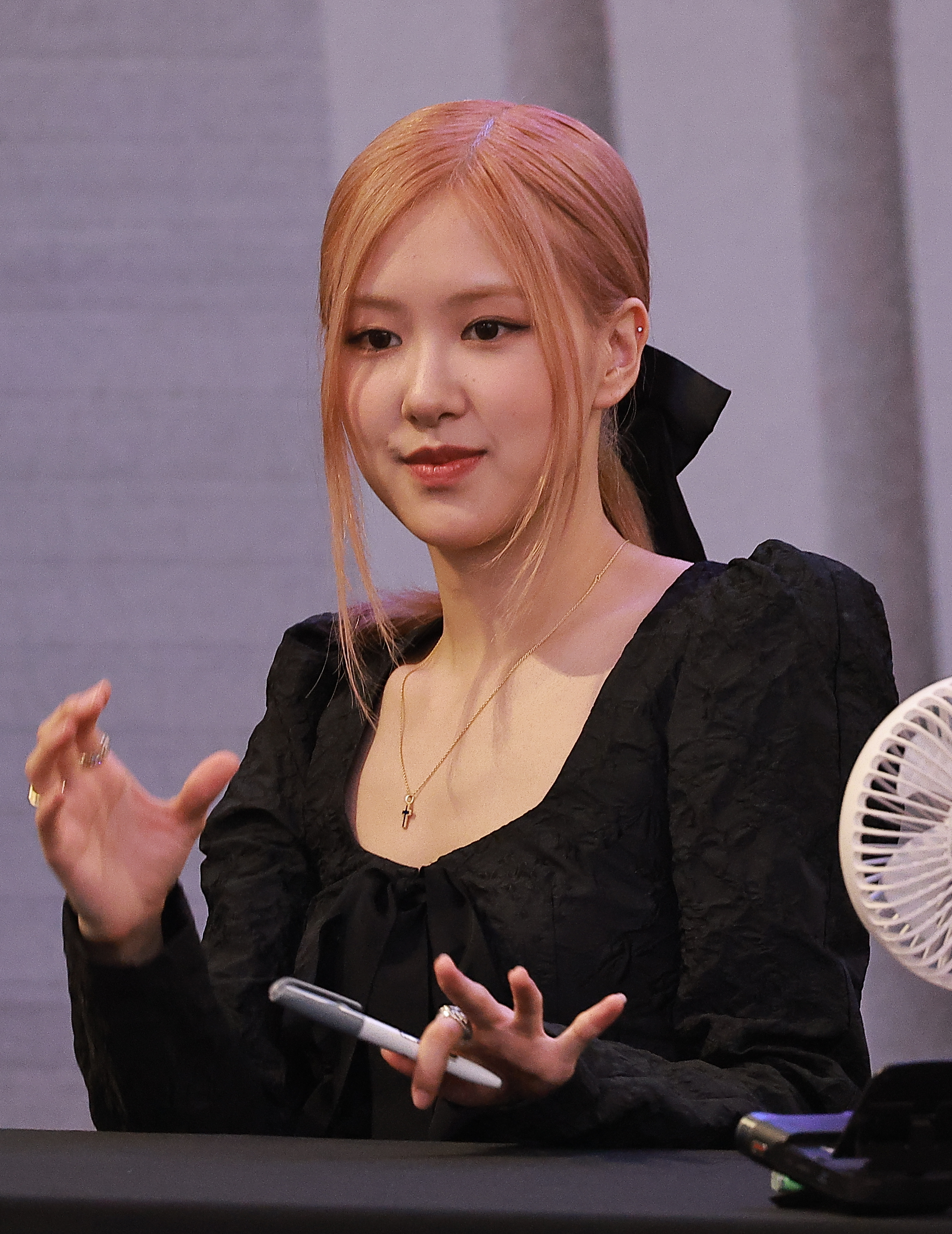
Rosé at a fan sign event, September 2022

"Hard to Love", a pop-disco solo sung by Rosé, is featured as the fifth track of Blackpink's second studio album Born Pink, which was released on 16 September 2022. Additionally, Rosé contributed songwriting credits to "Yeah Yeah Yeah", the fourth track of Born Pink.

=== 2023–present: Solo activities and Rosie ===
On 5 December 2023, YG Entertainment announced that Rosé along with the other members of Blackpink had renewed their contracts for group activities and that the members' individual contracts were still under discussion. YG Entertainment subsequently confirmed on 29 December 2023 that Rosé and the other Blackpink members agreed not to proceed with a contract with the label for individual activities. On 4 April, she released the song "Final Love Song" as the theme song for the survival reality show I-Land 2: N/a.

The Black Label, an associate company of YG Entertainment founded by Blackpink's main producer Teddy, disclosed on 17 June that they were in discussions with Rosé regarding an exclusive contract; it was confirmed the following day that she signed a management contract with the label. It was later revealed on 26 September that she had signed a solo deal with Atlantic Records. She recorded a cover of Coldplay's 2008 song "Viva la Vida" for the trailer and finale of the Apple TV+ series Pachinko's second season in 2024.

On 18 October, Rosé released the collaboration "APT." with American singer-songwriter Bruno Mars as the lead single of her debut studio album Rosie. The song was a commercial success worldwide and became Rosé's second number-one single on the Billboard Global 200 and Global Excl. U.S. charts. It topped the charts in several countries including New Zealand and Australia, where it became the first song by a solo female K-pop artist to reach number one on the ARIA Singles Chart. The song peaked at number two on the UK Singles Chart, marking the first time a female K-pop soloist reached the top ten. In the United States, it debuted at eight and peaked at number three on the US Billboard Hot 100, making Rosé the first female K-pop artist to enter the chart's top ten in history. It also became the first song by a female K-pop artist to enter the top 10 of Billboard Radio Songs, for which Rosé won a Guinness World Record. By November 2024, the song's popularity resulted in Rosé garnering more than 50 million monthly listeners on Spotify, breaking the record for the highest number of monthly listeners by a K-pop act on the platform. The song surpassed 1 billion streams on Spotify in 100 days after release, breaking the Guinness World Record for the fastest K-pop track to reach the milestone. "APT." was named the number-one best-selling global single of 2025 by the International Federation of the Phonographic Industry (IFPI), which marked the first time the IFPI Global Single Chart was topped by an artist outside of North America or Europe, and the first time a winning single featured non-English lyrics.

On 22 November, Rosé pre-released her album's second single "Number One Girl". It was announced on 25 November that she signed a global publishing administration deal with Warner Chappell Music. Rosé's debut studio album Rosie was released on 6 December 2024, alongside its third single "Toxic Till the End". Rosie debuted at number three on the Billboard 200, for which she earned a Guinness World Record as the highest-charting female K-pop artist on the chart. It also debuted at number four on the UK Albums Chart, making Rosé the first female K-pop soloist with a top-five album in the United Kingdom. In Australia, Rosie debuted at number two on the ARIA Albums Chart and became the highest charting album by a female K-pop soloist on the chart. Meanwhile, "Toxic Till the End" debuted at number 15 on the Billboard Global 200 and number six on the Global Excl. US, earning Rosé her third top-ten hit on the latter chart.

In 2025, Rosé withdrew from the Korea Music Copyright Association, which marked the first departure by a major K-pop artist from the association in 22 years. Her contract with the organisation was subsequently terminated on 31 January 2025. On 1 May, Rosé was announced as part of the lineup of artists featured on F1 the Album, the soundtrack album to the 2025 sports action drama film F1. Her song "Messy" was released as the album's second single on 8 May. On 27 June, Rosé and Alex Warren released "On My Mind" as the third single of the latter's debut album You'll Be Alright, Kid.

At the 2025 MTV Video Music Awards on 7 September, Rosé became the first K-pop act in history to win the VMA for Song of the Year with "APT." The song received three nominations at the 68th Annual Grammy Awards for Best Pop Duo/Group Performance, Record of the Year, and Song of the Year, becoming the most-nominated song by any Korean or K-pop artist in Grammy history and making Rosé the first K-pop artist to receive a nomination for one of the Big Four Grammy awards as a lead artist. She received two Guinness World Records as the first K-pop act to be Grammy-nominated for Record of the Year and Song of the Year. In September, Rosé signed with the talent agency WME for worldwide representation in her solo music career. At the Brit Awards on 28 February 2026, Rosé won International Song of the Year for "APT", becoming the first K-pop artist in history to win at the award ceremony.

In collaboration with Apple, Rosé released her standalone single "New Trick" on 17 September 2026, with its accompanying music video shot entirely using an iPhone 18 Pro.

== Artistry ==
Vogue talks about Rosé's voice type as being an "electric" soprano. Since her debut with Blackpink, Rosé's voice has received acknowledgement in the K-pop industry for its distinct vocal timbre and is nicknamed "the golden voice" amongst fans. Following Rosé's performance on Fantastic Duo 2, South Korean singer Gummy, whom Rosé cited as being a musical role model, complimented Rosé's voice for being "so unique" and describing it as "the [type of] voice young people love". After her solo debut with R, critic Kim Yoon-ha praises her memorable, husky tone that effectively conveys sorrow, aligning well with YG Entertainment's themes. She said that Rosé's delicate yet powerful vocal style transforms superficial lyrics into something profound, enhancing her dynamic presence in Blackpink and her solo work.

Rosé has named Beyoncé, Taylor Swift, Olivia Rodrigo, Gracie Abrams, and Avril Lavigne as some of her major musical influences. In a radio interview, Rosé cited labelmate Taeyang of Big Bang as a role model in her musical career. Rosé has also named American singer Tori Kelly as an inspiration towards her musical style.

== Fashion and endorsements ==
Throughout her career, Rosé's fashion image has been widely covered by fashion journalists and international media, with her personal style being notably defined by her signature blonde hair. She has been named the global ambassador and endorser of several fashion brands, including Yves Saint Laurent, Tiffany & Co., Rimowa, Puma, and Levi's, among others. Internationally, she has been selected to be the face of numerous fashion campaigns and collections, in addition to her features on fashion magazine covers and articles.

=== Yves Saint Laurent ===
In July 2020, Rosé was named the global ambassador for Yves Saint Laurent (YSL) by creative director Anthony Vaccarello, serving as its first global ambassador in 59 years. She was the global face of Saint Laurent's Fall/Winter 2020 campaign. Since then, Rosé has co-starred in the brand's Fall campaigns from 2022–2026, in addition to a 2021 Spring and a 2023 Autumn/Pre-Autumn campaign. In September 2021, Rosé made her debut appearance at the Met Gala, a fundraising event held annually at the Metropolitan Museum of Art Costume Institute in New York City, as Vaccarello's guest. As a result, she, alongside rapper CL, became one of the first female K-pop idols to attend the event. Involved in YSL's luxury cosmetics line, Rosé also became the muse for Yves Saint Laurent Beauty in January 2021, before ultimately becoming its global ambassador in January 2025 and headlining its Love Collection campaign.

Continuing her work with the brand, Rosé made her Cannes Film Festival debut dressed in YSL in May 2023. She was chosen by Vaccarello to serve as a guest juror at the 2024 ANDAM Fashion Awards. That same year, complementing the release of the Saint Laurents Editions book Love Letters, YSL produced a 500-copy limited edition vinyl featuring Rosé reading two love letters selected from the work. In 2025, Rosé returned to the Met Gala dressed in a custom Saint Laurent tuxedo, with which she was selected to be featured on the year's edition of Instagram's annual Met Gala class photo. She later appeared on the cover and editorial feature of Elle Korea's September 2026 special issue as YSL Beauty's global ambassador.

=== Tiffany & Co. ===
In April 2021, Rosé became Tiffany & Co's global ambassador and starred in its 2021 and 2022 Tiffany HardWear campaigns, with the latter photographed by Mario Sorrenti. In 2023, she headlined the global launch of the Tiffany Lock collection. Paying homage to her name, the Tiffany Lock Rosé Edition capsule selection later debuted with a feature of 18-karat rose gold and rare pink sapphires that same year.

=== Rimowa ===
Announced as a global ambassador for Rimowa in September 2023, Rosé has since starred in multiple installments of the brand's "Never Still" campaigns. She was featured in an April 2024 editorial for Dazed Korea to launch Rimowa's Essential collection, consisting of travel accessories in colours "Papaya" and "Mint". In April 2026, Rosé headlined the cover and editorial spread for Marie Claire Korea's special edition Rimowa issue.

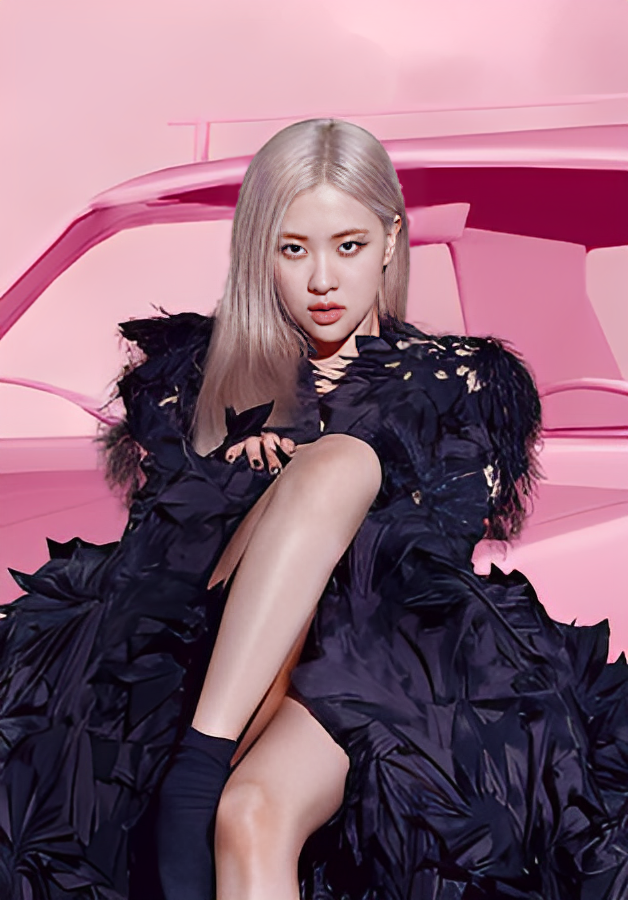
Rosé in an ad for PUBG Mobile, September 2020

=== Puma ===
In June 2024, Rosé was announced to be a global ambassador for Puma, supporting its "Redesign the Classics" program. In November, she and Dua Lipa headlined the brand's Puma Speedcat campaign. Collaborating with Puma, Rosé released a Rosie-themed capsule in August 2025; the collection featured a range of 10 pieces inspired by her personal wardrobe staples, including a sporty mesh top, a black miniskirt, and two new Speedcat Premium and Speedcat Ballet sneaker variants. The following year, she fronted the brand's H-Street sneaker and Speedcat Etoile campaigns. In October 2026, Rosé and Puma launched another collaboration featuring the Speedcat VTG available in the colours deep burgundy and espresso brown.

=== Levi's ===
In February 2026, Rosé was announced as a global ambassador for Levi's, appearing in its "Behind Every Original" ad campaign at the 2026 Super Bowl. She later co-starred in the brand's "Keep It Loose" campaign in August. The following month, she collaborated with Levi's to release a customisable limited edition collection centered on the brand's Trucker Jacket and Loose Boot Jeans.

=== Other endorsements ===
In 2018, Rosé and fellow Blackpink member Jisoo were selected as endorsement models for the Korean cosmetics brand Kiss Me. In October 2019, Rosé was announced as a promotional model for the Perfect World Entertainment's MMORPG Perfect World Mobile. In August 2021, she became a model for Korean unisex casual brand 5252 BY OIOI and contemporary brand OIOICOLLECTION. In December 2021, she announced her collaboration with the meditation and sleep app Calm, featuring her own bedtime story titled "Grounded With Rosé". In February 2022, alongside actor Yeo Jin-goo, Rosé was selected as one of the models for Korean retail store Homeplus for the brand's 25th anniversary promotions. In August 2022, Rosé became the global ambassador for skincare brand Sulwhasoo and starred in its #SulwhasooRebloom campaign. In January 2025, Rosé starred in the 2025 Valentine's Day campaign of American shapewear brand Skims.

Rosé was revealed as an international brand partner to Scotch whisky brand Johnnie Walker in October 2026. To celebrate the partnership, the Twist of Something Highball, one of the collaboration's signature cocktails, is set to be showcased and sold in various major bars across Seoul.

== Other ventures ==
=== Philanthropy ===
During the 2019–20 Australian bushfire season, Rosé posted on Instagram urging fans to support relief efforts, providing links to organisations that accepted donations and explaining, "We can make a difference if we all join in. Please help to save my home country". For the 2023 Asia-Pacific Economic Cooperation (APEC) summit, Rosé spoke at a mental health awareness event in Cupertino hosted by United States First Lady Jill Biden. In her speech, the singer opened up about her emotional struggles and the challenges that come with fame, and advocated for the prioritisation of mental health just as much as maintaining one's physical well-being. In 2024, Rosé donated a portion of the proceeds from her Season's Greetings: From Hank and Rosé to You merchandise to unspecified animal shelters.

Rosé was appointed a Member of the Order of the British Empire (MBE) in the 2024 New Year Honours for services to the United Kingdom COP 26 Presidency and advocacy for the 2021 United Nations Climate Change Conference of the Parties (being dated on 7 November 2023). On 22 November 2023, she was invested into this Order by King Charles III, alongside the other group members of Blackpink during a special investiture at Buckingham Palace, which was also attended by South Korean president Yoon Suk Yeol. The Order that her bandmates received is only honorary, but that of Rosé is substantive as she has dual citizenship in New Zealand and is, therefore, also a citizen from a Commonwealth realm.

== Impact ==
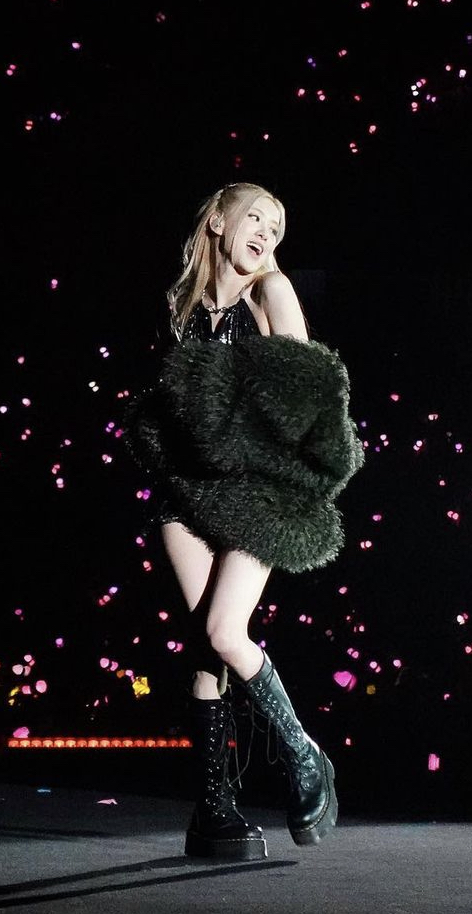
Rosé performing during the Born Pink World Tour, November 2022

Rosé is the third most-followed K-pop idol on Instagram behind bandmates Lisa and Jennie with over 84.3 million followers on the platform as of July 2025. Since 2018, she has appeared on the Korean Business Research Institute's female celebrity brand reputation list, a chart which tracks Korean celebrities with the most online searches and engagements, and previously reached the top 10. Rosé ranked first among celebrity YouTubers in 2025 according to Forbes Korea, earning an annual income of ₩11 billion (US$8.2 million) from a combined 3.6 billion views on her channel, which has 18.1 million subscribers.

In December 2023, Rolling Stone Australia / New Zealand named Rosé in their "Icons Issue" as one of 50 living icons from Australia and Aotearoa who have broken boundaries and opened doors for others, factoring in talent, charisma, enduring influence, and an "unmistakable Antipodean spirit". In particular, they recognised Rosé's impact on the music scene, describing her as "an artist who represents the success of K-pop's crossover into Western mainstream music". Writing for Weverse Magazine, music critic Seo Seongdeok named Rosé one of the "pop queens of today", "without whom the pop landscape of 2024 would've looked completely different". Alongside the record-breaking success of her single "APT." and album Rosie, he pointed to her exploration of universal themes in her music without the branding of K-pop or any specific genre, which allowed Rosé to successfully position herself "as an increasingly resonant global pop star from Korea". In April 2025, she was featured in the Time 100, recognised as one of the most influential people of 2025. She received a Presidential Commendation award at the 2025 Korean Popular Culture and Arts Awards from South Korea's Ministry of Culture, Sports and Tourism, which was given in recognition of her contribution to popular culture in South Korea and abroad. Outside of music, Rosé has been recognised for her advocacy efforts; the First Lady of the United States Jill Biden praised Rosé as "a global superstar who is using her platform as a force for good in the world". Biden added, "She's also an outspoken advocate for mental health and has greatly shared her story in the hopes of helping others". In 2026, Rosé was named one of the inductees into the Asian Hall of Fame.

=== Fashion ===
Rosé's influence on fashion has also extended to significant impact on the media value of her endorsements. In a 2021 article on the Korean Wave, The Times described her as the "queen" among the most influential acts, noting that she "started as part of the girl group Blackpink and is now a fashion influencer in her own right, possessing universal appeal that spans every continent". Rosé was credited as the reason for Yves Saint Laurent's Women's Summer 21 collection showcase earning 27.3 million views on YouTube, 11 million views on Instagram and Facebook, and 30.6 million views on Weibo in one day. The video of Saint Laurent's 2021 Spring/Summer collection reached 100 million views after she was featured in the video. Rosé generated an estimated media value (EMV) of $6.6 million with a post of her wearing a black Saint Laurent dress, the highest media value of any endorser. As the global ambassador for Tiffany and Co., Rosé was credited with helping the brand generate $36.4 million in revenue at its Vision and Virtuosity exhibition and contributing 13% of its total EMV in 2022. In 2023, Rosé's feature at the Tiffany Lock campaign generated a media impact value of $1.3 million in just two days, with the brand earning an extra $585,000 from posting about the partnership. As of January 2024, Rosé has overall generated $550 million in EMV across her endorsements with YSL, Tiffany, Rimowa, and Sulwhasoo, placing her as the second-most impactful celebrity that year, behind Kim Kardashian, as well as the first artist and Asian to record that milestone.

== Accolades and achievements ==
Rosé's accolades include six MAMA Awards, three Melon Music Awards, two Seoul Music Awards, a Brit Award, an MTV Video Music Award, a Golden Disc Award, and an Asia Artist Award. She became the first K-pop artist in history to win a Brit Award, and the first to win Song of the Year at the MTV Video Music Awards. She was also awarded the daesang (grand prize) for Song of the Year at the Asia Artist Awards and MAMA Awards. She has received three Grammy nominations, becoming the first K-pop act to be nominated in any Big Four category with acknowledgments in the Song of the Year and Record of the Year categories.

Rosé has been named in lists such as the Time 100 and the Forbes Korea Power Celebrity 40 in 2025, Billboard's K-Pop Artist 100 in 2024, Rolling Stone AU/NZ's 50 Living Icons from Australia and Aotearoa in 2023, and Variety's Power of Young Hollywood Impact Report in 2022. She was granted state and cultural honours, which include an appointment as a Member of the Most Excellent Order of the British Empire (MBE) for services to the United Kingdom COP 26 Presidency and advocacy for the 2021 United Nations Climate Change Conference of the Parties, as well as a South Korean Presidential Commendation at the 2025 Korean Popular Culture and Arts Awards for her contributions to popular culture in South Korea and abroad. Rosé and her bandmates in Blackpink received the fourth-class Okgwan Order of Cultural Merit at the 2026 Korean Popular Culture and Arts Awards.

== Discography ==
- Rosie (2024)

== Filmography ==
=== Television ===
Year	Title	Role	Notes	Ref.
2017	King of Mask Singer	Contestant (Circus Girl)	Episodes 103–104	
2017	Fantastic Duo 2	Contestant (Australia 400:1)	Episodes 19–20	
2021	Sea of Hope	Cast member	Episodes 1, 3–6	

=== Music video appearances ===
Year	Title	Artist(s)	Director(s)	Length	Ref.
2025	"Fat Juicy & Wet"	Sexyy Red and Bruno Mars	Bruno Mars and Daniel Ramos	2:25	

== Live performances ==
=== Music festivals ===
Event	Date	City	Country	Venue	Performed song(s)	Ref.
GMO Sonic	26 January 2025	Saitama	Japan	Saitama Super Arena	"Toxic Till the End"; "3am"; "Vampirehollie"; "Two Years"; "Drinks or Coffee"; "APT."	
Global Citizen Festival	27 September 2025	New York City	United States	Central Park	"APT."; "Two Years"; "Linger"; "Toxic Till the End"; "Wonderwall"	

=== Award shows ===
Event	Date	City	Country	Performed song(s)	Ref.
2024 MAMA Awards	22 November 2024	Osaka	Japan	"APT." (with Bruno Mars)	
68th Annual Grammy Awards	1 February 2026	Los Angeles	United States	"APT." (with Bruno Mars)	

=== Television shows and specials ===
Event	Date	City	Country	Performed song(s)	Ref.
Inkigayo	14 March 2021	Seoul	South Korea	"On the Ground"; "Gone"	
The Tonight Show Starring Jimmy Fallon	16 March 2021	New York City	United States	"On the Ground"	
M Countdown	18 March 2021	Seoul	South Korea	"On the Ground"; "Gone"	
Show! Music Core	20 March 2021	Seoul	South Korea	"On the Ground"; "Gone"	
Inkigayo	21 March 2021	Seoul	South Korea	"On the Ground"	
Show! Music Core	27 March 2021	Seoul	South Korea	"On the Ground"	
Inkigayo	28 March 2021	Seoul	South Korea	"On the Ground"	
Sukkiri	30 March 2021	Tokyo	Japan	"On the Ground"	
The Seasons: Lee Young-ji's Rainbow	29 November 2024	Seoul	South Korea	"APT."; "Number One Girl"; "Too Good to Say Goodbye"; "Because I Love You"	
The Tonight Show Starring Jimmy Fallon	11 December 2024	New York City	United States	"APT."; "Toxic Till the End"	
Le Gala des Pièces Jaunes	23 January 2025	Paris	France	"Stay a Little Longer"; "Toxic Till the End"; "APT."	

=== Radio shows and specials ===
Event	Date	City	Country	Performed song(s)	Ref.
BBC Radio 1 Live Lounge	3 December 2024	London	United Kingdom	"APT."; "Last Christmas"	
The Howard Stern Show	22 September 2025	New York City	United States	"APT."; "Toxic Till the End"; "Wonderwall"; "Call It the End"; "Norman Fucking Rockwell"; "50 Ways to Leave Your Lover"	

=== Other live performances ===
Event	Date	City	Country	Performed song(s)	Ref.
Music of the Spheres World Tour	22 April 2025	Seoul	South Korea	"APT." (with Coldplay)	
Music of the Spheres World Tour	25 April 2025	Seoul	South Korea	"APT." (with Coldplay)	
Summer Swag 2025	28 June 2025	Incheon	South Korea	"APT." (with Psy); "Toxic Till the End"; "Dance All Night"	
The Grammy Museum	4 December 2025	Los Angeles	United States	"Toxic Till the End"; "No Surprises"; "Call It the End"; "Number One Girl"; "Norman Fucking Rockwell"; "50 Ways to Leave Your Lover"; "APT."	
LACMA Art + Film Gala 2026	7 November 2026	Los Angeles	United States	"New Trick"; "Number One Girl"; "Read My Mind"; "APT."	

== See also ==
- List of artists who reached number one on the Australian singles chart
- List of artists who reached number one on the Canadian Hot 100
- List of artists who reached number one on the Japan Hot 100
- List of artists who reached number one on the UK Singles Downloads Chart
- List of artists who reached number one on the U.S. Pop Airplay chart
