= Aisha Ibrahim =

Aisha Ibrahim may refer to:

- Aisha Ibrahim (chef), Filipino-American chef
- Aisha Ibrahim (writer) (born 1969), Libyan novelist
