= New Trick =

- Apple Music edition cover. The Apple logo is omitted on all other streaming platforms.

Single by Rosé
- Written: May 2026
- Released: 17 September 2026
- Genre: Garage punk; pop punk; synth-punk; pop rock; alternative pop
- Length: 3:02
- Label: The Black Label; Atlantic
- Songwriters: Rosé; Andrew Wells; Amy Allen
- Producer: Andrew Wells

Rosé singles chronology
"On My Mind" (2025)	"New Trick" (2026)

Music video
- "New Trick" on YouTube

Alternative cover
- Version used on all other streaming and digital platforms

"New Trick" is a song by New Zealand and South Korean singer Rosé. It was released through The Black Label and Atlantic Records as a standalone single on 17 September 2026. The song was written by Rosé, Amy Allen, and Andrew Wells, who also produced the track.

== Background and release ==
On 9 September 2026, Rosé and Apple announced the song "New Trick" would be released on 17 September as part of the company's "Shot on iPhone" campaign, to coincide with the release of the iPhone 18 Pro. The announcement was accompanied by a 15-second teaser on Instagram, which featured a brief snippet of the track and showed Rosé holding a purple lollipop with the words "new trick" on the wrapper.

Following the song's release, Rosé appeared on Apple Music's radio show New Music Daily Radio with Zane Lowe to discuss the collaboration.

== Composition and lyrics ==
"New Trick" has been described as a garage punk, pop punk, synth-punk, and pop rock track. It has been also been characterised as a dreamy, uptempo alt-pop anthem that channels the "iconic energy of 90s romcoms" and the "punk rock edge of the early aughts". Stylistically likened to Olivia Rodrigo, the song incorporates a "grungy, high-energy production" accompanied by a scream-along chorus and vocally "syrupy sweet" verses.

The song was written in May 2026 "during a hectic week", two days after Rosé attended the Met Gala. Written by the singer with frequent collaborator Amy Allen and producer Andrew Wells, "New Trick" marked a departure from the sadder songs Rosé had written for her debut studio album Rosie. Lyrically, it addresses heartbreak with an attitude towards recovery rather than loss, and showcases Rosé charmingly replacing vulnerability with "humour, self-possession, and forward momentum". Rosé has further described the track as the "cutest thing we’ve ever made together", saying she enjoyed "channeling that energy" while recording it.

== Critical reception ==
In a review for Stereogum, Tom Breihan positively lauds "New Trick" for its multiple hooks, calling the song an "explosively catchy piece of bubblegum synth-punk".

== Music video ==
An accompanying music video for "New Trick" was directed by Dave Meyers and was filmed entirely on Apple's iPhone 18 Pro. The video opens with a “nostalgic” coming-of age aesthetic, depicting Rosé energetically singing alongside a live band inside a gymnasium. The perspective then shifts back and forth to Rosé exploring the sunlit suburban outdoors, where she dresses in school uniform-inspired styling accessorised with a branded purple lollipop to kick a vintage red sedan, chill alongside her skateboarding friends by an empty swimming pool, and "get up to good, clean fun".

== Charts ==
=== Weekly charts ===
Weekly whart performance
Chart (2026)	Peak position
Australia New Music Singles (ARIA)	20
Canada CHR/Top 40 (Billboard)	23
Chile Anglo Airplay (Monitor Latino)	8
China (TME Korean)	16
Dominican Republic Anglo Airplay (Monitor Latino)	11
Estonia Airplay (TopHit)	105
Global 200 (Billboard)	179
Hong Kong (Billboard)	9
Japan Digital Singles (Oricon)	94
Japan Hot 100 (Billboard)	41
Lithuania Airplay (TopHit)	76
Malaysia International (RIM)	14
New Zealand Aotearoa Singles (RMNZ)	11
New Zealand Hot Singles (RMNZ)	8
New Zealand Airplay (RCS)	35
Poland Airplay (OLiS)	73
Singapore (RIAS)	10
South Korea (Circle)	82
Taiwan (Billboard)	3
UK Singles Sales (Official Charts)	21
UK Video Streaming (Official Charts)	69
US Bubbling Under Hot 100 (Billboard)	10
US Hot Rock & Alternative Songs (Billboard)	26
US Pop Airplay (Billboard)	18
Venezuela Airplay (Record Report)	42
Vietnam Hot 100 (Billboard)	65

=== Monthly charts ===
Monthly whart performance
Chart (2026)	Peak position
South Korea (Circle)	189

== Release history ==
Release dates and formats
Region	Date	Format	Label	Ref.
Various	17 September 2026	Digital download; streaming	The Black Label; Atlantic	
Italy	18 September 2026	Radio airplay	Warner	
