= Jiaoying Summers =

Chinese-American actress and comedian (born 1990)

- 梁娇颖
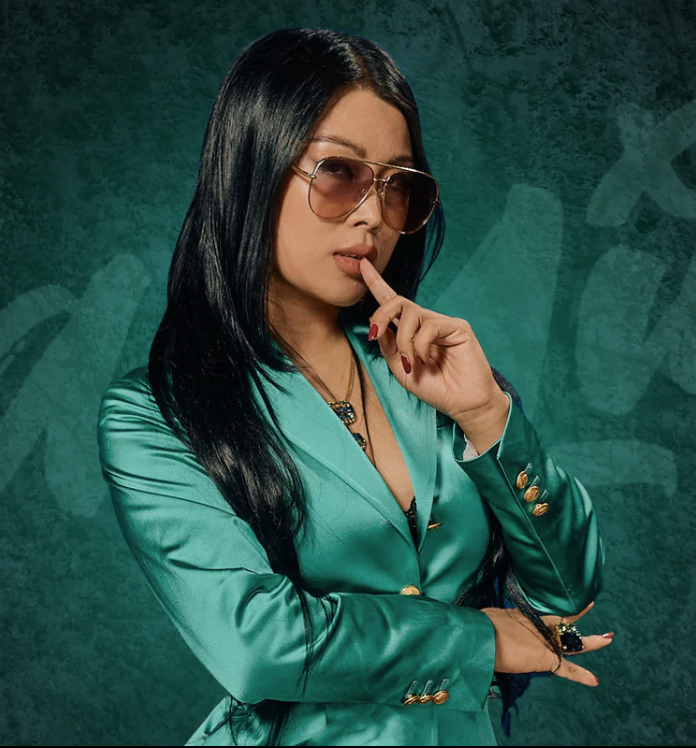
- Summers in 2022
- Born: Liang Jiaoying; January 21, 1990 (age 36); Henan Province, China
- Education: University of Kentucky
- Occupations: Actress; comedian; producer
- Years active: 2013–present
- Children: 2
- Website: jiaoyingsummers.com

Liang Jiaoying (Chinese: 梁娇颖), professionally known as Jiaoying Summers (born January 18, 1990), is a Chinese-American stand-up comedian, actress, and producer. She is best known for her TikTok videos focused on AAPI representation and female empowerment. Her stand-up comedy often references her upbringing and East Asian culture.

== Early life and education ==
Summers was born and raised in Henan during China's one-child policy, and her parents delivered her at home instead of a hospital "to avoid the shame of having a girl" as their only child. Summers initially aspired to become an actress, inspired by watching films from a video rental shop her mother operated with her cousin. She has described her father as a "non-functioning alcoholic."

Summers came to the United States at the age of 18 and studied at the University of Kentucky, where she earned a Bachelor's degree in economics with a minor in theater. After graduating, she relocated to Los Angeles and studied acting for four years with acting instructor Howard Fine.

== Career ==
In 2013, Summers served as the president for new business development for her family's construction company. She also interned for the IMAX Corporation in Los Angeles. In 2014, Summers won the title of Miss China in the international beauty pageant "Queen of the Universe". She began acting in 2016.

Summers is the founding partner and CEO of Summers Media, an international production company.

=== Comedy ===
During an audition for the police drama show Rebel, executive producer John Singleton heard Summers making jokes and suggested that she try performing stand-up comedy. Following his advice, she performed at her first open mic night in 2019. She began posting on TikTok in 2020, and has since gained more than 1.2 million followers and has accumulated over 1 billion views.

Summers incorporates personal material into her comedy routines, including her "decision to talk about China's one-child policy as a survivor". Her video went viral, leading to being banned on TikTok, which is owned by Chinese company ByteDance. TikTok cited violation of community guidelines, and restored her account three months later. Summers has spoken about continued deflated viewership, leading her to suspect she had also been shadow banned.

Summers performs regularly at The Laugh Factory, The Comedy Store, and Carolines NYC, was a headliner at the New York Comedy Festival in 2022 and headlined the Apollo theater in November 9, 2023. She also starred in the Netflix Is A Joke festival's Women in Comedy show. In 2022, Summers released a comedy special as part of the Comedy InvAsian series, on NBC Peacock.

Summers was the owner of two comedy clubs, both located in the Los Angeles area. The Hollywood Comedy is $5 for 5 minutes pay-to-play. and has had controversy. The Pasadena Comedy is permanently closed.

== Personal life ==
"People ask me how I got the name Summers. My ex-husband's last name is Xia 夏，it means Summers."

Summers is the Asia ambassador for Operation USA, a non profit humanitarian organization supporting health, education and relief programs. She is also the international ambassador for the Linzhou Charity Federation.

In 2022, Summers was inducted into the Asian Hall of Fame.

Summers is the mother of two children. She has spoken openly about her struggles with bipolar disorder.

== Filmography ==
=== As actress ===
Year	Title	Role	Notes
2016	Major Crimes	Tai Chi Student	as Jiaoying Liang
2016	The Scarlet Thorn	Lin Wu	as Jiaoying Liang
2016	Alex and Lotus	Lotus Wang	as Jiaoying Liang
2016	Hollywood Diversity	Michelle	as Jiaoying Liang
2017	The Missing 6	Carrie Ling	as Jiaoying Liang
2019	American Bistro	Yu Yang	uncredited
2020	The Madams	Steph	as Gia Summers

=== As producer ===
Year	Title	Notes
2016	The Scarlet Thorn	as Jiaoying Liang
2016	The Like Challenge	as Jiaoying Liang
2019	An Unforgettable Winter	as Jiaoying Liang
2020	Wo men zhe xie nian	
