= Puma Speedcat =

Line of shoes by Puma

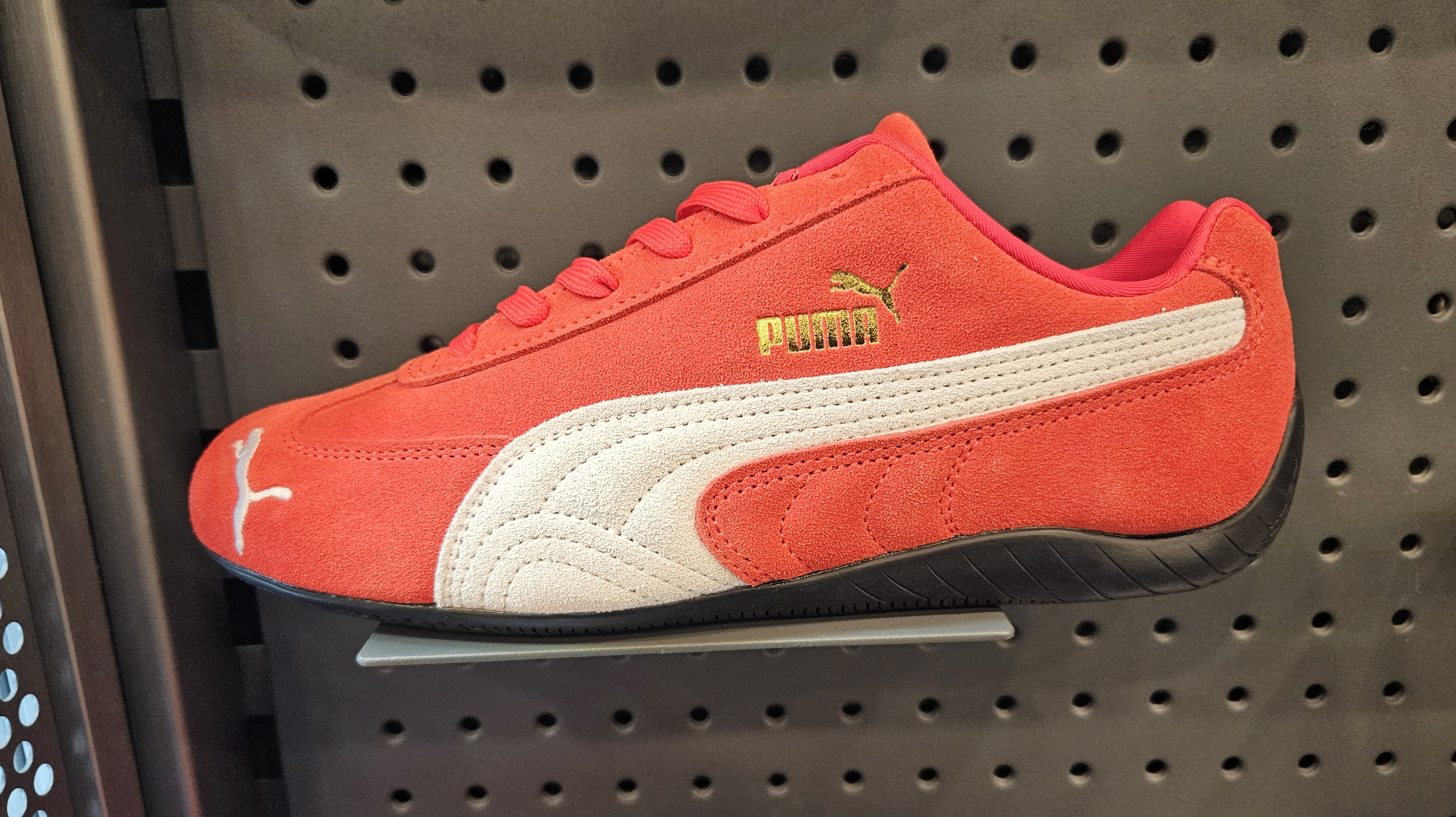
- Type: Sneakers
- Inventor: Puma
- Inception: 1999; 27 years ago
- Manufacturer: Puma
- Available: Yes

Puma Speedcat is a racing shoe released by Puma. The popularity of the shoe led to it becoming a lifestyle shoe and popularizing the low profile sneaker.

== Overview ==
Puma had a history of designing racing shoes specifically for Formula 1 drivers. Each shoe was made to be tailored for each driver. In 1999, Puma board member Martin Gänsler partnered with designer Rudi Hieblinger and agency Création & Focus Design to create a new racing shoe based on the one created for Dominique Zhang. Specifically, his 1984/85 model. The new shoe was called the Puma Speedcat and was released in 1999. The original version made for racing came in both premium calfskin or kangaroo leather and also included fireproof lining on the shoe. The following year in 2000, Puma decided to launch a lifestyle version of the shoe in both mid-top and low top variants. The release also included a collaboration with Sparco. The lifestyle release replaced the stronger leather with normal leather and suede and also removed the fireproof lining. The shoe became popular in the early 2000s in Europe where motorsport fans and fashion oriented people loved the shoe for its unique design.

== Popularity ==
The shoe had some collaborations over the years since its launched but never received another general release. In July 2024, Puma decided to re-release the shoe and partnered with NAKED Copenhagen on the release. The shoe quickly became popular thanks to its sleek design and very thin sole. The Speedcat is one of main shoes that helped popularize the trend of low profile sneakers with very thin soles that started that same year. While there had been slimmer shoes that have become popular, what set the Speedcat and similar shoes like the Onitsuka Tiger Mexico 66 apart were the very thin soles that were similar to flats but for sneakers.

== Models ==
=== Speedcat OG ===
The original version of the shoe with the suede upper and very thin sole.

=== Speadcat Leather ===
The same design of the Speedcat but with a full leather upper instead of suede. It was released in August 2024.

=== Speedcat Ballet ===
A version of the Speedcat that is meant to be closer to a ballet flat. Released in March 2025, the shoe features cutouts on the upper back of the shoe and top to replicate the look of ballet flats.

=== Speedcat Go ===
The Speedcat Go was released in March 2025 and features a breathable mesh upper with an opening in the middle of the top. Instead of normal laces, it has a bungee lacing system for easier use.
