= Toxic Till the End =

- Promotional graphic

Single by Rosé

from the album Rosie
- Released: 6 December 2024
- Studio: Glenwood Place Recording (Burbank)
- Genre: Emo pop; power pop; synth-pop
- Length: 2:37
- Label: The Black Label; Atlantic
- Songwriters: Rosé; Michael Pollack; Emily Warren; Evan Blair
- Producer: Evan Blair

Rosé singles chronology
"Number One Girl" (2024)	"Toxic Till the End" (2024)	"Messy" (2025)

Music video
- "Toxic Till the End" on YouTube

"Toxic Till the End" is a song by New Zealand and South Korean singer Rosé. It was released on 6 December 2024 through The Black Label and Atlantic Records as the third single from her debut studio album, Rosie (2024). It was written by Rosé, Michael Pollack, Emily Warren, and Evan Blair, the latter of whom also produced the track. It has been described as an emo pop, power pop, and synth-pop single blending guitars and synths with emotionally raw lyrics. Inspired by Rosé's past experiences, the song revolves around a toxic on-again, off-again relationship.

Critics positively reviewed "Toxic Till the End" for its emotional depth and energetic production. The song achieved success and peaked at number four on the Circle Digital Chart, becoming the second top-ten hit from Rosie in South Korea. It peaked at number 15 on the Billboard Global 200 and number six on the Global Excl. US, marking her third top-ten hit on the latter chart. Elsewhere, it reached the top ten in Hong Kong, Singapore, Taiwan, and Malaysia and charted in Australia, Canada, Japan, the United Kingdom, and the United States, among other countries. The song has since been certified platinum by the Korea Music Content Association (KMCA) and the Australian Recording Industry Association (ARIA) and gold by Music Canada and the Recording Industry Association of Japan (RIAJ).

An accompanying music video was directed by Ramez Silyan and released on Rosé's YouTube channel simultaneously with the single's release. The video features Rosé and actor Evan Mock in a toxic love story filmed at Old Westbury Gardens, New York. Rosé promoted "Toxic Till the End" with performances at The Tonight Show Starring Jimmy Fallon, Le Gala des Pièces Jaunes, GMO Sonic, The Howard Stern Show, the Global Citizen Festival, and Blackpink's Deadline World Tour. The song was awarded Best Vocal Performance at the 2025 MAMA Awards and Best Digital Song at the 40th Golden Disc Awards, and received a nomination for Best K-Pop at the 2025 MTV Video Music Awards.

== Background and promotion ==
In December 2023, YG Entertainment revealed that although all members of Blackpink renewed their contract for group activities, they did not sign with the agency for their individual activities. The following year, Rosé signed a management contract with The Black Label and a recording deal with Atlantic Records to launch her solo career. On 1 October 2024, she announced the release of her debut studio album, Rosie.

On 18 October, Rosé released "APT.", a collaboration with American singer Bruno Mars, as the lead single from her upcoming debut album. The song was a commercial success and peaked atop the Billboard Global 200 and various charts worldwide, while entering the top ten on the US Billboard Hot 100 and the UK Singles Chart. She followed with the album's second single "Number One Girl" on 22 November. On 4 December, Rosé announced "Toxic Till the End" as the third single to be released alongside the album on 6 December. An accompanying teaser poster for the single was released depicting a man running after the singer in a garden, followed by a second teaser photo of the two sitting by a fireplace and affectionately looking at one another.

== Composition and lyrics ==
"Toxic Till the End" has been described as an emo pop, power pop, and synth-pop track infused with guitars and "bubbling synths". Stylistically, the song has been musically likened to Avril Lavigne and Taylor Swift, especially in comparison to the latter's melodic structures and songwriting narratives.

Thematically, the song reflects the turbulence of a toxic on-again, off-again relationship, drawing from Rosé's personal experiences. It has been noted to depict Rosé as both the victim and a willing participant in the "cycle of frustration". Originally titled "The Ex", the song was inspired by a former lover who had become such a frequent topic of discussion for Rosé that they became known as "the ex" among her friends. Rosé shared in an interview with Apple Music's The Zane Lowe Show that the track was the result of her need to gain closure about the experience, stating: "We've talked about the ex a bit too much, it's about time that we write a song called 'the ex'." Ultimately, however, the song's title was later changed to "Toxic Till the End" since it was considered to be the "better punchline". During an episode of Vanity Fair's Lie Detector Test interview series, Rosé commented on rumours that the song was inspired by Jaden Smith, clarifying that the song was not in fact about him and that the two had never dated, although they were good friends.

== Critical reception ==
Writing for Clash, Robin Murray positively labeled "Toxic Till the End" as a song of escape that "bursts with energy". Jeff Benjamin of Billboard ranked it at number one in his track-by-track album review, praising its emotional depth, power-pop production, and mainstream appeal. He highlighted its "buoyancy" despite its "destructive details," calling it a moment in Rosé's solo journey where she steps out of her place in Blackpink to fully embrace her individuality. Similarly, Renowned for Sound's Eleanor Carr highlighted the track as "a memorable listen", complimenting it for its "tongue-in-cheek lyrics" and sarcastic take on a toxic relationship.

== Accolades ==
"Toxic Till the End" won two weekly Melon Popularity Awards on 30 December 2024 and 6 January 2025.

Awards and nominations for "Toxic Till the End"
Year	Organisation	Award	Result	Ref.
2025	Asian Pop Music Awards	Best Lyricist (Note: Lyricists: Rosé, Evan Blair, Michael Pollack, Emily Warren)	Nominated	
2025	MAMA Awards	Best Vocal Performance Solo	Won	
2025	MAMA Awards	Song of the Year	Nominated	
2025	Melon Music Awards	Song of the Year	Nominated	
2025	MTV Video Music Awards	Best K-Pop	Nominated	
2026	Golden Disc Awards	Best Digital Song (Bonsang)	Won	
2026	Golden Disc Awards	Song of the Year (Daesang)	Nominated	
2026	iHeartRadio Music Awards	Best Music Video	Nominated	

== Commercial performance ==
"Toxic Till the End" debuted at number six on the Billboard Global Excl. US with 50.4 million streams and 4,000 sold outside the US. With this, Rosé achieved two concurrent songs in the top ten, as her previous single "APT." simultaneously charted at number one. It marked her third total solo top-ten hit on the chart, ahead of bandmate Jisoo's one and behind Jennie and Lisa's four each. In South Korea, "Toxic Till the End" debuted at number 59 with less than two days of tracking. The following week, it rose to its peak at number four on the chart, becoming the second top-ten hit from Rosie after "APT.". In the United States, "Toxic Till the End" debuted at number 90 on the Billboard Hot 100, her third entry on the chart following "On the Ground" and "APT.". On 25 January 2025, it became her first solo song to enter the Billboard Pop Airplay chart at number 40, with a rise of 50% in plays since the previous week.

== Music video ==
Directed by Ramez Silyan, the music video for the single was released on 6 December 2024. It was filmed at Old Westbury Gardens in Long Island, New York, featuring Rosé alongside American actor Evan Mock. Drawing inspiration from Gilmore Girls, the cinematic video tells a toxic love story between the two characters, culminating in a bitter and dramatic conclusion. At the start, pink-haired Mock flags down Rosé's car on a country road after his bicycle tire blows out. She is intrigued and gives him a ride, which leads into a rom-com montage of the couple's happy early days, including scenes of them chasing each other through the gardens of a large estate, sharing a tender fireside snuggle, and her signing his cast after he wipes out on his skateboard. However, problems grow in the relationship, with Rosé noticing when Mock covers his phone to conceal a text from her. Angered, she attempts to leave but burns out in her car. The couple's back-and-forth dynamic continues to alternate between adoring embraces and annoyed shoving, becoming dangerous as Rosé knocks him into a statue. Although the messy couple appear to make up again, Rosé reveals their chance encounter at the start was, in fact, premeditated.

== Live performances ==
On 11 December 2024, Rosé performed a live band medley of the song and "APT." on The Tonight Show Starring Jimmy Fallon. On 23 January 2025, Rosé presented a three-song set, performing "Stay a Little Longer", "Toxic Till the End", and "APT.", at the Gala des Pièces Jaunes 2025 held at the Paris La Défense Arena. She later performed a six-song set, which included "Toxic Till the End", at the Japanese music festival GMO Sonic 2025 held at the Saitama Super Arena as a special guest on 26 January. On 28 June, she performed "APT.", "Toxic Till the End", and "Dance All Night" as a special guest at Psy's Summer Swag 2025 concert. "Toxic Till the End" was later included in Blackpink's Deadline World Tour setlist as a part of Rosé's solo set. She also performed it on The Howard Stern Show on 22 September, and at the Global Citizen Festival on 27 September.

== Credits and personnel ==
Credits adapted from the liner notes of Rosie.

Recording

- Recorded at Glenwood Place Recording (Burbank, California)
- Mixed at MixStar Studios (Virginia Beach, Virginia)
- Mastered at Sterling Sound (New York City)

Personnel

- Rosé – vocals, songwriter
- Emily Warren – songwriter
- Michael Pollack – songwriter
- Evan Blair – songwriter, producer
- Serban Ghenea – mix engineer
- Bryce Bordone – assistant mix engineer
- Chris Gehringer – mastering engineer
- Will Quinnell – mastering engineer

== Charts ==
=== Weekly charts ===
Weekly chart performance for "Toxic Till the End"
Chart (2024–2025)	Peak position
Australia (ARIA)	31
Bolivia Anglo Airplay (Monitor Latino)	3
Canada Hot 100 (Billboard)	54
China (TME Korean)	8
CIS Airplay (TopHit)	99
Costa Rica Anglo (Monitor Latino)	11
Czech Republic Singles Digital (ČNS IFPI)	48
Global 200 (Billboard)	15
Greece International (IFPI)	95
Hong Kong (Billboard)	2
Indonesia (ASIRI)	17
Japan Hot 100 (Billboard)	32
Japan Streaming (Oricon)	43
Lebanon Airplay (Lebanese Top 20)	6
Lithuania Airplay (TopHit)	41
Malaysia International (RIM)	3
MENA (IFPI)	17
New Zealand Aotearoa Singles (RMNZ)	3
New Zealand Hot Singles (RMNZ)	1
Philippines (Philippines Hot 100)	11
Poland (Polish Airplay Top 100)	15
Russia Airplay (TopHit)	147
San Marino Airplay (SMRTV Top 50)	19
Saudi Arabia (IFPI)	19
Singapore (RIAS)	2
Slovakia Airplay (ČNS IFPI)	47
South Korea (Circle)	4
Taiwan (Billboard)	2
United Arab Emirates (IFPI)	19
UK Singles (Official Charts)	72
US Billboard Hot 100	90
US Adult Pop Airplay (Billboard)	38
US Pop Airplay (Billboard)	23
Vietnam (IFPI)	18

=== Monthly charts ===
Monthly chart performance for "Toxic Till the End"
Chart (2024–2025)	Position
Lithuania Airplay (TopHit)	39
South Korea (Circle)	5

=== Year-end charts ===
Year-end chart performance for "Toxic Till the End"
Chart (2025)	Position
Lithuania Airplay (TopHit)	163
Global 200 (Billboard)	176
New Zealand Aotearoa Singles (RMNZ)	15
South Korea (Circle)	12

== Certifications ==
Certifications for "Toxic Till the End"
Region	Certification	Certified units/sales
Australia (ARIA)	Platinum	70,000^{‡}
Canada (Music Canada)	Gold	40,000^{‡}
New Zealand (RMNZ)	Gold	15,000^{‡}
Streaming
Japan (RIAJ)	Gold	50,000,000^{†}
South Korea (KMCA)	Platinum	100,000,000^{†}
^{‡} Sales+streaming figures based on certification alone.^{†} Streaming-only figures based on certification alone.

== Release history ==
Release dates and formats for "Toxic Till the End"
Region	Date	Format	Label	Ref.
Various	6 December 2024	Digital download; streaming	The Black Label; Atlantic	
United States	28 January 2025	Contemporary hit radio	Atlantic	
Italy	14 March 2025	Radio airplay	Warner Italy	

== See also ==
- List of certified songs in South Korea
- List of K-pop songs on the Billboard charts
