= Number One Girl =

2024 song by Rosé

- Digital cover

Single by Rosé

from the album Rosie
- B-side: "APT."
- Released: 22 November 2024
- Studio: Glenwood Place Recording (Burbank)
- Genre: Pop-punk; soft rock
- Length: 3:36
- Label: The Black Label; Atlantic
- Songwriters: Rosé; Amy Allen; Bruno Mars; Dernst Emile II; Carter Lang; Dylan Wiggins; Omer Fedi
- Producers: Bruno Mars; D'Mile; Omer Fedi; Carter Lang; Dylan Wiggins

Rosé singles chronology
"APT." (2024)	"Number One Girl" (2024)	"Toxic Till the End" (2024)

Music video
- "Number One Girl" on YouTube

"Number One Girl" is a song by New Zealand and South Korean singer Rosé. It was released on 22 November 2024 through The Black Label and Atlantic Records as the second single from her debut studio album, Rosie (2024). The track was written by Rosé, along with Amy Allen and the song's producers Bruno Mars, D'Mile, Carter Lang, Dylan Wiggins, and Omer Fedi. It has been described as a sentimental pop-punk piano ballad, blending elements of soft rock. The lyrics explore themes of heartbreak, unrequited love, longing, insecurity, and vulnerability. Rosé wrote the song after being deeply affected by hateful comments online.

The single was accompanied by a self-directed music video, featuring a retro camcorder style. The video showcases Rosé wandering through various nighttime locations in Seoul, including the Jamsu Bridge, and a lookout, as she sings to an unnamed lover. Rosé debuted the song live on KBS2's The Seasons: Lee Young-ji's Rainbow on 29 November 2024. The song ultimately achieved moderate success, peaking at number 29 on the Billboard Global 200 and securing top-five positions in Hong Kong, Malaysia, Singapore and Taiwan. It also charted in countries such as Australia, Canada, South Korea, and the United Kingdom.

== Background and promotion ==
On 18 October 2024, Rosé released "APT.", a collaboration with American singer Bruno Mars, as the lead single from her upcoming debut studio album. The song went on to become a commercial success, reaching number one in 19 countries, including Australia and New Zealand, as well as the top 10 in the United Kingdom and the US Billboard Hot 100. On 19 November, the singer announced "Number One Girl" as the second single from Rosie through her Instagram. In an accompanying caption, she clarified that the title stands for her fans whom she refers to as her "number ones". The post also includes the artwork depicting the singer gazing away from the camera in a white shirt printed with the song's title.

== Composition and lyrics ==
['Number One Girl'] was written after a terrible night of scrolling through the internet till like 6 a.m., and I barely got any sleep. I walked up to the studio the next day very cranky, and they asked me, 'How have you been?' And I was like: 'Very bad. I'm so exhausted. I'm exhausted trying to please everyone.' I'm always just trying my best to be [the best version of myself], but I felt a little lost and like I was never good enough. I was a bit cranky against the world. And I wanted to write a song that's just so, like, disgustingly open and honest.

— Rosé on the song's origins.

"Number One Girl" was written by Rosé, Amy Allen, Bruno Mars, Dernst Emile II, Carter Lang, Dylan Wiggins, and Omer Fedi; it was produced by the latter five. It is a sentimental pop-punk song, featuring a piano ballad that lyrically delves into themes of heartbreak, unrequited love, longing, insecurity and vulnerability over a soft rock instrumental. It was written the day after attending an event, after which Rosé found herself looking through hate comments on social media. She was unable to sleep due to being "obsessed with what these people were gonna say about [her]", as opposed to what she wanted them to say about her. She also admitted to feeling "disgusted" about herself and being in denial as a result.

== Critical reception ==
Writing for Clash, Shahzaib Hussain dubbed the single as a "bruised torch song", lauding it as Rosé's "most candid and expressive release to date". Gabriel Saulog of Billboard Philippines labelled it as a "devastating opening track" to her album, opining that the powerful ballad highlighted Rosé's "golden voice" and heart-wrenching lyrics with its "embrace [of] piano-laden melodies and crashing drums". The Wall Street Journal's Mark Richardson described the song to be a "theatrical, swooning ballad", which he remarked was both a "statement of purpose" and a "bold choice to open a pop album". Similarly, in her review of the album for NME, Crystal Bell described the song as "a striking introduction to an album that largely trades K-pop’s grandeur for intimate songwriting and emotional candour".

In his review of the album, Jeff Benjamin of Billboard ranked the song at number five, praising Rosé's emotionally charged vocals and comparing its impact to Olivia Rodrigo’s "Drivers License". In Ludovic Hunter-Tilney of Financial Times review, he described songs like “Number One Girl” as "classier but unmemorable" compared to "APT." and referred to them as "Olivia Rodrigo-style ballads".

== Accolades ==
Awards and nominations for "Number One Girl"
Year	Organisation	Award	Result	Ref.
2025	Asian Pop Music Awards	Top 20 Songs of the Year	Won	
2025	Asian Pop Music Awards	Best Composer (Note: Composers: Rosé, Amy Allen, Dernst Emile II, Omer Fedi, Carter Lang, Bruno Mars, Dylan Wiggins)	Nominated	
2025	Asian Pop Music Awards	Song of the Year	Nominated	
2025	Seoul Music Awards	Ballad Award	Nominated	

== Music video ==
A self-directed music video was released together with the single on 22 November 2024. Recorded in the style of a retro camcorder, it depicts Rosé wandering at night around the streets of Seoul, a skate park, the top of a lookout, and the Jamsu Bridge, while she sings to an unnamed lover. On 13 February 2025, a performance video of the song was released. Filmed in Noisy-le-Grand, the video featured scenes of Rosé wandering through the Les Espaces d'Abraxas and performing delicate choreography with a male dancer.

== Live performance ==
Rosé performed the song live for the first time on KBS2's late-night music program The Seasons: Lee Young-ji's Rainbow for the episode aired on 29 November 2024. The live performance version from The Seasons was released as a track on a limited digital version of Rosie on 10 December 2024.

== Track listing ==
- Digital download and streaming
1. "Number One Girl" – 3:36
- 7-inch vinyl
1. "Number One Girl" – 3:36
2. "APT." – 2:49

== Credits and personnel ==
Credits adapted from the liner notes of Rosie.

Recording

- Recorded at Glenwood Place Recording (Burbank, California)
- Mixed at MixStar Studios (Virginia Beach, Virginia)
- Mastered at Sterling Sound (New York City)

Personnel

- Rosé – vocals, songwriter
- Bruno Mars – songwriter, producer
- Carter Lang – songwriter, producer
- D'Mile – songwriter, producer
- Dylan Wiggins – songwriter, producer
- Omer Fedi – songwriter, producer
- Amy Allen – songwriter
- Serban Ghenea – mix engineer
- Bryce Bordone – assistant mix engineer
- Chris Gehringer – mastering engineer
- Will Quinnell – mastering engineer

== Charts ==
=== Weekly charts ===
Weekly chart performance
Chart (2024–2025)	Peak position
Australia (ARIA)	61
Canada Hot 100 (Billboard)	63
China (TME Korean)	4
Global 200 (Billboard)	29
Hong Kong (Billboard)	3
Indonesia (ASIRI)	26
Japan Hot Shot Songs (Billboard Japan)	15
Malaysia International (RIM)	3
New Zealand Aotearoa Singles (RMNZ)	3
New Zealand Hot Singles (RMNZ)	7
Philippines (Philippines Hot 100)	20
Portugal Airplay (AFP)	5
Singapore (RIAS)	4
South Korea (Circle)	12
Taiwan (Billboard)	2
UK Singles (Official Charts)	84
US Bubbling Under Hot 100 (Billboard)	1

=== Monthly charts ===
Monthly chart performance
Chart (2024)	Position
South Korea (Circle)	16

=== Year-end charts ===
Year-end chart performance
Chart (2025)	Position
South Korea (Circle)	93

== Certifications ==
Certifications
Region	Certification	Certified units/sales
Australia (ARIA)	Gold	35,000^{‡}
^{‡} Sales+streaming figures based on certification alone.

== Release history ==
Release dates and formats
Region	Date	Format	Label	Ref.
Various	22 November 2024	Digital download; streaming	The Black Label; Atlantic	
United States	11 November 2025	7-inch vinyl	Atlantic	

== See also ==
- List of K-pop songs on the Billboard charts
