= Asian Hall of Fame =

American honorary organization

Asian Hall of Fame is a United States-based organization that honors Asian and Pacific Islander and Native individuals and communities for their contributions to arts, sciences, sports, public service, and global impact. It was established in 2004 by the Robert Chinn Foundation (RFC) in Seattle, Washington. It remained affiliated with the RFC until 2020 when it separated and became its own independent non-profit. Maki Hsieh is the president and CEO of the organization.

== Inductees ==
Year	Name	Description	Award	References
2004	Gary Faye Locke	American politician and diplomat; 21st Governor of Washington (1997–2005), U.S. Secretary of Commerce (2009–2011), U.S. Ambassador to China (2011–2014) and first Chinese American to serve in that role	Inductee	
2004	Rick Noji	American high jumper; world champion and former U.S. national champion	Inductee	
2004	Yuji Okumoto	American actor, producer and martial artist known for roles in martial arts films	Inductee	
2004	George Tsutakawa	American sculptor and painter noted for public art installations in the Pacific Northwest	Inductee, in memoriam	
2004	Z.Z. Wei	Chinese American painter and fine artist active in mid‑20th century American art communities	Inductee	
2007	Apolo Anton Ohno	American retired short‑track speed skater; eight‑time Winter Olympic medalist (two gold, two silver, four bronze); most decorated U.S. Winter Olympian; inducted into U.S. Olympic Hall of Fame in 2019	Inductee	
2013	Loida Nicolas Lewis	Filipino‑born American lawyer and business leader; first Filipina licensed to practice law in New York without U.S. law school, former chair and CEO of TLC Beatrice	Inductee	
2013	Richard Cho	Vice President of Basketball Strategy for the Memphis Grizzlies in the NBA	Inductee	
2013	Teddy Zee	American media, technology and entertainment executive and producer	Inductee	
2014	Grace Park	Canadian-American actress and advocate known for television roles and Asian American representation in media	Inductee	
2014	Manu'ula Tuiasosopo	Former NFL player; contributed to Seattle Seahawks and San Francisco 49ers Super Bowl teams	Inductee	
2014	Nathan Adrian	American competitive swimmer; five‑time Olympic gold medalist representing the U.S. between 2008 and 2016	Inductee	
2014	Norman Yoshio Mineta	American politician; U.S. Transportation Secretary under President George W. Bush, former Cabinet member under President Clinton, co‑founder of Asian Pacific American Heritage Month, and recipient of Presidential Medal of Freedom	Inductee	
2015	Benson Henderson	American former professional mixed martial artist; UFC Lightweight Champion and WEC Lightweight Champion; multiple title defenses and considered among the top lightweight fighters in MMA	Inductee	
2015	Betty Nguyen	Vietnamese American television journalist; one of the first Vietnamese American anchors at CNN and NBC News	Inductee	
2015	Carrie Ann Inaba	American television personality, dancer, choreographer and talk show host; long‑time judge on ABC's Dancing with the Stars and former co‑host of CBS's The Talk	Inductee	
2015	Jeanette Lee	American professional pool player nicknamed "the Black Widow"; world‑ranked champion, WPBA and BCA Hall of Fame inductee, advocate for scoliosis awareness	Inductee	
2016	Bruce Lee	Chinese American martial artist, actor and filmmaker; global influence on martial arts cinema and pop culture	Inductee, in memoriam	
2016	Kristi Yamaguchi	American former competitive figure skater; Olympic gold medalist and U.S. Olympic Hall of Fame inductee; New York Times best‑selling author	Inductee	
2016	Major General Antonio Taguba	Filipino American U.S. Army officer; led the Taguba Report on Abu Ghraib detainee abuse and advocate for social justice reforms	Inductee	
2016	Connie Chung	American broadcast journalist; first Asian American co‑anchor on U.S. weekday national network news broadcasts	Inductee & Lifetime Achievement	
2017	Daniel Dae Kim	Korean American actor and producer; prominent AAPI advocate	Inductee	
2017	Duy‑Loan Le	Vietnamese American engineer; first female Senior Fellow at Texas Instruments and inductee to the Women in Technology Hall of Fame	Inductee	
2017	Sonita Lontoh	Indonesian American technology executive and advocate; inductee to the Women in Manufacturing Hall of Fame	Inductee	
2018	Kevin Kwan	Singapore born novelist; author of Crazy Rich Asians and bestselling fiction exploring Asian identity and representation	Inductee	
2018	Kourtney Kang	Korean‑Irish American television producer and writer; contributed to ABC's Fresh Off the Boat and led diverse storytelling initiatives in entertainment	Inductee	
2018	Melissa Lee	Chinese American television journalist; first Chinese American host on CNBC and longtime anchor and correspondent	Inductee	
2018	Roy Yamaguchi	Japanese American chef and restaurateur; founder of Roy's Restaurants and promoter of Hawaiian‑fusion cuisine	Inductee	
2019	J. R. Celski	American retired short‑track speed skater; three‑time Winter Olympian and three‑time Olympic medalist; held multiple world and junior world records and credited with helping popularize U.S. short‑track speed skating	Inductee	
2019	Jon M. Chu	American film director, producer and screenwriter; directed Crazy Rich Asians (2018) and In the Heights (2021), among other major works helping elevate Asian American representation in Hollywood	Inductee	
2019	Luly Yang	Taiwanese‑born American fashion and costume designer; founder of Luly Yang Couture in Seattle and recognized internationally for bridal and evening wear	Inductee	
2019	Marc Anthony Nicolas	Filipino American television producer and two‑time Emmy Award winner; supervising producer on The Talk and host/executive producer of Make Your Marc on GMA Pinoy TV	Inductee	
2020	James Hong	American actor, producer and director; career spanning over seven decades and more than 400 film and television credits; co‑founder of East West Players to advance Asian American theatrical representation	Lifetime Achievement Award	
2020	Congressmember Judy Chu	American politician and psychologist; first Chinese American woman elected to the U.S. Congress, representing California since 2009	Inductee	
2020	Masaharu Morimoto	Japanese chef; gained international fame as an Iron Chef on Iron Chef (Japan) and Iron Chef America; founder of restaurants across the U.S. and Asia	Inductee	
2020	Noel Lee	American engineer, inventor and entrepreneur; founder and CEO of Monster Inc., recognized for innovations in high-performance audio accessories	Inductee	
2020	Cheryl Burke	American professional dancer and television personality; first female professional to win Dancing with the Stars and first to win back‑to‑back seasons; two‑time Emmy nominee	Inductee	
2020	Masi Oka	Japanese American actor, producer and digital effects artist; known for his role as Hiro Nakamura on Heroes; worked in visual effects in major films	Inductee	
2020	Wally Yonamine	Japanese American multi‑sport athlete; first Japanese American to play in the NFL and one of the first Americans to play professional baseball in Japan	Inductee	
2021	Nancy Kwan	Chinese American actress whose Hollywood breakthrough in The World of Suzie Wong (1960) helped expand representation of Asian actors in 1960s cinema; winner of a Golden Globe New Star award in 1961	Lifetime Achievement Award	
2021	Brandon Lee	American actor and martial artist; son of actor Bruce Lee; known for The Crow (1994)	Inductee, In Memoriam	
2021	Dr. Linda M. Liau	Taiwanese‑born American neurosurgeon and researcher; Chair of Neurosurgery at UCLA and pioneer in brain cancer immunotherapy	Inductee	
2021	Hon. Tani Gorre Cantil‑Sakauye	Filipina American jurist; served as Chief Justice of California (2011–2022), first person of color and second woman in that role; head of the Judicial Council of California	Inductee	
2021	Indra Nooyi	Indian American business executive; CEO (2006–2018) and Chair (2007–2019) of PepsiCo; one of the first women of color to head a Fortune 50 company	Inductee	
2021	Ken Jeong	American actor, comedian, writer and former licensed physician; best known for roles in The Hangover series and Community; also creator of TV sitcom Dr. Ken	Inductee	
2021	Phil Chen	Jamaican supportive bassist of Chinese descent; played with Eric Clapton, Ray Manzarek and members of the Doors; awarded Jamaican Order of Distinction in 2014	Inductee	
2021	Ren Hanámi	Japanese American actor, author, director and producer; Chair of SAG‑AFTRA Asian Pacific American Media Committee and advocate for AAPI representation	Inductee	
2021	Steve Aoki	American DJ, record producer and entrepreneur; founder of Dim Mak Records; global EDM artist and son of Benihana founder Rocky Aoki; advocate for inclusivity in music industry	Inductee	
2021	Sumi Jo	South Korean operatic coloratura soprano; Grammy Award winner and one of the first Asian sopranos to perform leading roles in major Western opera houses	Inductee	
2022	Andrew Cherng & Peggy Cherng	Taiwanese‑born Chinese American restaurateurs; co‑founders and co‑CEOs of Panda Restaurant Group (Panda Express), one of the largest Asian‑themed restaurant chains in the U.S.	Inductees	
2022	Chloe Kim	American professional snowboarder; two‑time Olympic gold medalist in women's halfpipe (2018, 2022), youngest woman to win back‑to‑back halfpipe golds; multi‑medalist at X‑Games and Youth Olympics	Inductee	
2022	Daniel Ho	American musician, composer and producer specializing in Hawaiian music; six‑time Grammy Award winner and recognized for contributions to ukulele and slack‑key guitar genres	Inductee	
2022	Daniel Pak	American music educator, performer, and frontman of Seattle reggae band Kore Ionz; advocate for music education in under‑served communities	Inductee	
2022	Deepika Padukone	Indian actor and philanthropist; leading figure in Bollywood and international cinema, recipient of multiple Filmfare Awards and a TIME 100 list honoree in 2018; founder of Live Love Laugh Foundation focused on mental health awareness	Inductee	
2022	Elizabeth An, Helene An & Catherine An & Diana An	Vietnamese‑American sisters and restaurateurs; founders of Crustacean restaurant group credited with popularizing Vietnamese cuisine in the U.S.	Inductees	
2022	Hiro Yamamoto	American bassist, co‑founding member of Soundgarden and credited as first Asian American bassist in a Grammy Award-winning rock band	Inductee	
2022	Hiroshima	American fusion jazz band honored by the Smithsonian; recognized for integrating Asian influences into mainstream music	Inductees	
2022	Jiaoying Summers	Chinese American comedian and social media influencer; international touring performer and founder of comedy venues	Inductee	
2022	Joseph Bae & Janice Lee	Korean American husband‑and‑wife duo; Bae is co‑CEO of KKR, and Lee is a New York Times bestselling author; prominent leaders in business and philanthropy	Inductees	
2022	Karen Wong	Founder Emeritus of the Asian Hall of Fame and Robert Chinn Foundation	Inductee	
2022	Margaret Cho	Korean American comedian, actress and writer; Grammy and Emmy nominee for her work exploring social issues and Asian American identity	Inductee	
2022	Momo Wang	Chinese American animation and creative director at Illumination Entertainment; creator of globally recognized character Tuzki	Inductee	
2022	Omar Lee & Christine Lee	American real estate investors and property development entrepreneurs based in the Pacific Northwest	Inductees	
2022	Pat Chun	American collegiate athletic director; credited as first Asian American athletic director at a Power Five university	Inductee	
2022	Robert Chinn & Ruth Chinn	Chinese American bankers; founders of first Asian‑owned bank in the U.S.; inducted posthumously	Inductees, In Memoriam	
2022	Senator Tammy Duckworth	American politician and combat veteran; first Thai American U.S. Senator, recipient of Purple Heart and advocate for AAPI representation in public service	Inductee	
2022	Tia Carrere	American actor and singer; Grammy Award-winning artist and cultural icon with breakout roles in Wayne's World and True Lies	Inductee	
2022	Toni Ko	American entrepreneur; founder of NYX Cosmetics and Bespoke Beauty Brands; commercial real estate investor and philanthropist	Inductee	
2022	Virginia Cross	Muckleshoot Indian Tribal Council Chair and elder; one of longest‑serving female tribal council chairs in the United States	Inductee	
2023	Adele Lim	Malaysian screenwriter and film director; co‑written Crazy Rich Asians and directed Joy Ride; known for mentoring writers and promoting representation in Hollywood	Inductee	
2023	Annie Young‑Scrivner	American business executive; CEO of Wella Company and advocate for diversity in corporate leadership	Inductee	
2023	Ben Fong‑Torres	Chinese American music journalist and author; longtime writer for Rolling Stone magazine	Inductee	
2023	Charlie Zhang & Ling Zhang	Chinese American philanthropists recognized for leadership in community service and cultural initiatives	Inductees	
2023	Doug Baldwin Jr.	American former NFL wide receiver; Super Bowl champion with the Seattle Seahawks; CEO and founder of community-focused ventures in sports and youth development	Inductee	
2023	Dr. Lisa T. Su	Taiwanese American technology executive; Chair and CEO of AMD and recognized global leader in semiconductor innovation	Inductee	
2023	Dr. Peter P. Lee	American leader in immuno‑oncology; chair of research at City of Hope and expert in cancer research	Inductee	
2023	Dr. Shang‑Li & Betty Huang	American philanthropists; leadership in health and cultural organizations supporting the AAPI community	Inductees	
2023	Far East Movement	American music group; Billboard‑topping hitmakers (Like a G6) and acknowledged for mainstreaming Asian‑American hip‑hop culture	Inductees	
2023	Jennifer Lee	(TOKiMONSTA) Korean American electronic music producer; Grammy-nominated artist known for festival performances and media collaborations	Inductee	
2023	Lalisa Manoban	Thai singer and member of Blackpink; global K‑pop cultural icon and influential figure in music and fashion	Inductee	
2023	Pin Ni	Chinese American urban planner and entrepreneur; founder and president of Wanxiang America, contributing to sustainable development	Inductee	
2023	Rep. Marilyn Strickland	American politician; U.S. Representative for Washington's 10th Congressional District; advocate for AAPI representation in government	Inductee	
2023	Sam Cho	Korean American civic leader; Port of Seattle Commissioner and former executive focused on inclusive governance	Inductee	
2023	Freddie Mercury	British singer-songwriter with South Asian (Parsi) heritage; lead vocalist of Queen and global music icon; inducted posthumously	Inductee, In Memoriam	
2023	Rocky Aoki	Japanese American restaurateur and entrepreneur; founder of Benihana; inducted posthumously	Inductee, In Memoriam	
2023	Ryuichi Sakamoto	Japanese composer and electronic music pioneer; Oscar‑winning artist; inducted posthumously	Inductee, In Memoriam	
2023	Kiet Nguyen	Vietnamese American U.S. Navy veteran; awarded the U.S. Navy Cross for extraordinary heroism during the Vietnam War, notably in the rescue of downed U.S. airmen in 1972; later resided in Seattle and worked at Boeing before retiring around 2005	Inductee	
2023	Kim Thayil	American guitarist and founding member of the grunge band Soundgarden; named by Rolling Stone as one of the 100 greatest guitarists of all time; two‑time Grammy Award winner, and influential for defining the “Seattle Sound” in alternative rock	Inductee	
2023	Santos Manuel	Native American tribal elder of the San Manuel Band of Mission Indians; recognized posthumously for leadership and service	Inductee, In Memoriam	
2023	Nintendo	Japanese multinational video game company; corporate inductee recognized for global influence in entertainment and technology	Inductee	
2024	Seo Eunji	Consul General of the Republic of Korea in Seattle since 2023; recognized for leadership in public diplomacy and strengthening U.S.–Korea cultural ties in the Pacific Northwest	Inductee	
2024	Anne Akiko Meyers	American concert violinist known for her solo and orchestral performances; recipient of an Avery Fisher Career Grant and frequent collaborator with major orchestras	Inductee	
2024	Bing Xie	Chinese American business executive and philanthropist; co‑CEO of Silergy Corporation specializing in semiconductor technologies	Inductee	
2024	Crystal Kung Minkoff	American television personality and entrepreneur; co‑founder of Real Coco beverage company and first Chinese‑American cast member of Real Housewives of Beverly Hills	Inductee	
2024	Eva Chow	American Chinese cultural executive and influencer; recognized for contributions in hospitality, beverage and urban cultural programming in Los Angeles area	Inductee	
2024	Joe Wong	Chinese American comedian and author; first Asian performer on The Late Show with David Letterman and White House stand‑up performer	Inductee	
2024	Julia S. Gouw	American philanthropist and former banking executive; recognized for leadership in community investment and philanthropy networks	Inductee	
2024	Ke Huy Quan	Vietnamese‑born American actor; Oscar‑winning performance in Everything Everywhere All at Once (2022), previously known for Indiana Jones and the Temple of Doom and The Goonies; first Vietnam‑born actor to win an Academy Award	Inductee	
2024	Kwek Leng Beng	Singaporean Chinese entrepreneur; Chairman of Hong Leong Group, significant figure in global business and philanthropy	Inductee	
2024	Larry Li	Chinese American venture investor; founder and managing partner of Silicon Valley's Amino Capital, supporting Asian American entrepreneurs	Inductee	
2024	Leena Nair	British Indian business executive; Global CEO of Chanel and advocate for diversity in corporate leadership	Inductee	
2024	Maia Shibutani & Alex Shibutani	American ice dancers; Olympic bronze medalists and multiple-time U.S. national champions known as the "Shib‑Sibs"	Inductees	
2024	Millennium & Copthorne	Singapore‑based hospitality corporation recognized as a corporate inductee for global influence in hospitality and Asian heritage preservation	Inductee	
2024	Marta & Raj Bhathal; Lisa Bhathal Merage; Alex Bhathal	Indian American philanthropy family; recognized for leadership in sports management, community engagement and cultural investment	Inductees	
2024	Richard Lui & Kristen Lui	American journalists and media leaders; known for broadcast journalism and founding initiatives to elevate Asian American visibility in media	Inductees	
2024	Aisha Ibrahim	Saudi‑born celebrity chef and restaurateur based in Seattle; notable presence in Pacific Northwest culinary scene	Inductees	
2024	Bruce Harrell	American politician; served as Mayor of Seattle and a civic leader in Pacific Northwest; inducted as regional honoree	Inductee	
2024	Daniel Nguyen & Katherine Lam	Chinese American civic leaders and co-founders of Bambuza Hospitality Group in Seattle; recognized for contributions to community and hospitality	Inductees	
2024	Lydia Lee	Korean American marketing and art professional; recognized as "Arts Educator of the Year" for her leadership in media, art, and education programming.	Inductee	
2024	David Yang Wasielewski	American restaurateur; managing partner at Din Tai Fung Seattle and Pacific Northwest community supporter	Inductee	
2024	Jacqueline Yang	American entrepreneur; owner of Seattle SuperHawks basketball team and philanthropist in Pacific Northwest sports and civic engagement	Inductee	
2024	Jonathan Sposato	American technology executive and philanthropist; investor and supporter of Asian American leadership in business and community	Inductee	
2024	Preston Singletary	Tlingit Native American glass artist and cultural educator; recognized for bridging Indigenous and Asian Pacific artistic traditions	Inductee	
2024	N. Scott Momaday	Kiowa novelist and Native American writer; Pulitzer Prize‑winning author inducted posthumously as part of Indigenous inclusion class	Inductee, In Memoriam	
2024	Anna May Wong	American film actress and silent‑era Hollywood star; first Chinese American film actor recognized internationally; inducted posthumously	Inductee, In Memoriam	
2024	Seiji Ozawa	Japanese conductor and music director; led Boston Symphony Orchestra; inducted posthumously in honor of musical legacy	Inductee, In Memoriam	
2024	William Saito	Japanese American cybersecurity expert and entrepreneur; inducted posthumously for business and technology contributions	Inductee, In Memoriam	
2025	Yoshiki	Japan's biggest rock star; recognized for his international achievements in music, film, and fashion, as well as for his continued influence on global art and culture.	Inductee	
2025	Soyeon Yi	First Korean astronaut	Inductee	
2025	Michelle Kwan	Olympian and former U.S. Ambassador to Belize	Inductee	
2025	Il Yeon Kwon	Founder of H Mart	Inductee	

== See also ==
- Asian Americans
- Asian American arts
- Asian American and Pacific Islander Heritage Month
