= Aisha Ibrahim (chef) =

American chef

Zsahleya Aisha Ibrahim (born in Iligan City, Philippines) was the executive chef at the Seattle restaurant Canlis. Her partner Samantha Beaird also worked at Canlis. Ibrahim was the first female executive chef in the restaurant's more than seventy-year history. They left April 8, 2025.

== Early life ==
Ibrahim is the oldest of three children. The family emigrated from the Philippines to Evans, West Virginia when she was six years old. She was an athlete at Elon University, attending on a basketball scholarship. until an injury sidelined her. After that, she applied to Le Cordon Bleu in San Francisco.

== Career ==
After culinary school, Ibrahim began working at restaurants around the world, working her way up to becoming sous chef at Manresa in California. She moved to the Basque region of Spain to work for Eneko Atxa at Azurmendi before moving on to its sister restaurant Aziamendi in Thailand as chef de cuisine. She spent two years planning to open her own restaurant in Bangkok, but Covid forced her to scuttle her plans.
