= Rosie (Rosé album) =

- Digital and standard cover

Studio album by Rosé
- Released: 6 December 2024
- Recorded: 2023–2024
- Studio: Glenwood Place Recording (Burbank)
- Genres: Pop; pop-punk; alternative pop; synth-pop; R&B
- Length: 36:28
- Labels: The Black Label; Atlantic
- Producers: Omer Fedi; Ojivolta; Rob Bisel; Cirkut; Carter Lang; Bruno Mars; Dylan Wiggins; Evan Blair; Rogét Chahayed; Griff Clawson; D'Mile; Greg Kurstin; The Monsters & Strangerz; Michael Pollack; Blake Slatkin; Isaiah Tejada; Jacob Weinberg; Andrew Wells; Freddy Wexler

Rosé chronology
R (2021)	Rosie (2024)

Singles from Rosie
- 1. "APT." Released: 18 October 2024; 2. "Number One Girl" Released: 22 November 2024; 3. "Toxic Till the End" Released: 6 December 2024

Rosie is the debut solo studio album by New Zealand and South Korean singer Rosé. Released on 6 December 2024 by The Black Label and Atlantic Records, the album marks Rosé's first solo release after departing from YG Entertainment and Interscope Records in 2023. Rosé wrote and co-produced Rosie with a range of collaborators, including Bruno Mars, Carter Lang, and Omer Fedi. It was conceived as a 12-track pop album exploring pop-punk and alternative pop styles, whilst blending elements of 1990s R&B, synthpop, and ballads. The subject matter explores fame and heartbreak in Rosé's early twenties.

Rosie received generally favourable reviews from critics, with most critics praising the album for its perceived emotional depth, strong songwriting, and versatile pop sound. Upon release, it debuted at number three on the Billboard 200, selling over 100,000 units in its first week, and earned a Guinness World Record as the highest-ranked album by a K-pop female soloist on the chart. It also entered the top ten in countries such as Australia, Canada, Germany, Japan, New Zealand, South Korea, and the United Kingdom. The album has since been certified double platinum by the Korea Music Content Association (KMCA) for selling 500,000 copies as well as platinum by Recorded Music NZ (RMNZ), gold by Music Canada and SNEP, and silver by the British Phonographic Industry (BPI). According to the International Federation of the Phonographic Industry (IFPI), Rosie was the 19th best-selling album worldwide across all formats in 2025, and the 15th best-selling album in streaming.

Three singles supported the album. "APT.", a collaboration between Rosé and Mars, was released as the album's lead single to commercial success. It reached number one on the Billboard Global 200 and topped the charts in various territories, including South Korea, Australia, Canada, Japan, and New Zealand, while entering the top three in the United States and the United Kingdom. It was followed by the singles "Number One Girl" and "Toxic Till the End", the latter of which peaked at number four in South Korea and at number six on the Billboard Global Excl. US. The album received several accolades, including Millions Top 10 at the 2025 Melon Music Awards.

== Background ==
In December 2023, YG Entertainment revealed that although Rosé, alongside the other members of Blackpink, renewed their contracts for group activities, they did not sign with the agency for their individual activities. On 17 June 2024, Blackpink's main producer Teddy disclosed that The Black Label, an associate company of YG Entertainment, was in discussions with Rosé for an exclusive contract; the following day, it was confirmed that she had signed a management contract with the label. On 26 September, Rosé revealed that she had also signed a solo deal with Atlantic Records and that new music was upcoming in the next few months.

== Themes and lyrics ==
I think I'm grateful enough to have gone through a few relationships, you know, like a normal girl in her 20s. I do want people to understand that I'm not much different from your average girlfriend, or 23-year-old girl. I'm probably very relatable if you listen to my songs, and if anyone's been in that kind of a relationship. It doesn't even have to be about a boyfriend, just any type of toxic relationship.

— Rosé on the album's themes.

Comprising 12 tracks, Rosie has been described to represent "a burst of honesty" from the singer, showcasing Rosé as a co-writer of the entire record. Explaining the album title, Rosé revealed that she had chosen Rosie, a nickname derived from her first name, Roseanne, which she allows "friends and family to call [her]", to express her desire for listeners to feel closer to her. Rosé revealed that prior to confirming Rosie as the album's title, she had used Number One Girl as a working album title. She further shared that Rosie was conceived as a personal "little journal" after she found herself in a recording session in Los Angeles following the conclusion of Blackpink's Born Pink World Tour (2022–2023).

A reflection of her personal experiences of a failed relationship, Rosie has been primarily characterised to be a "breakup album" that explores Rosé's feelings of heartache, loss, anger, and desire. Additionally, the album provides insight into her navigation of life as a "20-something woman" under heavy public scrutiny, showcasing a perspective into the complexities of youthful emotion. In an interview with Paper, Rosé revealed that Rosie is thematically about her "terrible 20s" and her hopes of making people understand her as a person, stating: "I'm ready to be a bit more vulnerable and open and honest in order for people to not misunderstand, and take me for what I am."

== Production and music ==
Rosé started creating the album shortly after the conclusion of Blackpink's Born Pink World Tour in September 2023. She booked several songwriting sessions in Los Angeles, which resulted in the production of potential tracks that could be used for an album. Encouraged by positive feedback from her friends, Rosie was then developed across several weeks and months-long trips to the city, leading to a year of writing songs and meeting new producers while still feeling "confused and lost".

Musically, Rosie has been described as a collection of polished pop tracks that explore pop-punk and alternative pop styles, blending various elements such as stuttering 90s-style R&B to shiny synthpop and raw ballads. Given its showcase of Rosé's vocal artistry, the album has also been likened to be a take on Lilith Fair-era pop, in the way that it commits to "galvanic feeling" over filigree. The record begins with "the stripped-back" piano ballad "Number One Girl," setting a "contemplative tone" that introduces Rosé's raw and "emotional" vocal performance. This reflective mood shifts in the second track, "3am," which blends acoustic elements with subtle 808s and trap beats, exploring lyrical themes of love and imperfection. "Two Years" introduces '80s-inspired synths, marking a "bittersweet synth-pop song" with layered vocal effects. "Toxic Till the End" follows with an intense "whirlpool of guitars and synths," capturing an "emotional frankness" through its power-pop and synth-pop production. "Drinks or Coffee" lightens the mood with "snappy beats" and the "sparkly elegance of progressive turn-of-the-millennium R&B" while exploring the complexities of relationships.

"APT."
Inspired by the apateu rhythmic chant of a South Korean drinking game, the chorus of "APT." received praise for its catchiness and energetic sound.

This is followed by "APT.", a pop-punk and pop rock track that features indie rock and electropop elements. It opens with a rap verse, transitions to a "melodious" pre-chorus, and builds to an energetic chorus influenced by the Apartment game chant. Inspired by a popular South Korean drinking game called Apartment, the track uses the game's rhythmic chant of "apateu" (아파트) to create a playful and addictive chorus.

"Gameboy" employs an acoustic guitar loop reminiscent of "early 00s pop&B", as well as a catchy rhythmic production and "playful wordplay". It is followed by "Stay a Little Longer," a song co-written by Australian songwriter Sarah Aarons which incorporates a classic soulful rock production that highlights Rosé's vocals. "Not the Same", infused with slight touches of Americana, brings raw energy, with light guitar-plucking production contrasted by the singer's vocal delivery. "Call It the End" combines emotional lyrics, "lush" piano production, and a heartfelt vocal performance. "Too Bad for Us" uses a "stripped-down" arrangement to emphasise intimate storytelling, while "Dance All Night" closes the album with a "chilled-out vibe," meditating on moving forward despite heartache.

== Promotion and release ==
=== Marketing ===
On 11 February 2024, in celebration of her 27th birthday, Rosé teased the release of her new solo music, previewing a snippet of her upcoming song "Vampirehollie" on her then newly opened Instagram broadcast channel. On 27 September, after announcing her signed deal with Atlantic Records, she introduced a new Instagram account (@vampirehollie), naming it after the unreleased track. Shortly thereafter, on 1 October, Rosé announced that her first studio album would be named Rosie. The announcement was accompanied by a post of the album cover, which depicts a close up of the singer lying down with blonde curls. The album tracklist was revealed on 25 November 2024. Rosie was released on 6 December 2024; it was made available in more than 15 physical variants across CD and vinyl formats, each containing collectibles with some being randomised. Limited vinyl editions of Rosie containing the exclusive bonus track "Vampirehollie" were also released, as well as limited digital editions containing "Vampirehollie" and the live performance version of "Number One Girl" from KBS's The Seasons.

Throughout the months leading up to and after Rosie's release, Rosé promoted her album in the United States by guesting in various interviews, online talk shows, and podcasts, including appearances in Vogue's Now Serving and Life in Looks, BuzzFeed's Puppy Interview, Vanity Fair's Lie Detector Test, Hot Ones, and Therapuss with Jake Shane. Additionally, she conducted radio interviews with SiriusXM, iHeartRadio, Elvis Duran and the Morning Show, and On Air with Ryan Seacrest alongside its adjunct program American Top 40, which she guest-hosted. She also discussed the album's conception alongside her experiences as a solo artist in interviews with The New York Times and Apple Music 1's The Zane Lowe Show, as well as on a magazine feature in Paper. Internationally, she was featured in magazine cover stories with i-D, which was released under a limited edition print zine, GQ Korea, The Cut, Vanity Fair Italia, W China, and Dazed. Following the album's release, Rosé appeared on The Tonight Show Starring Jimmy Fallon and The Kelly Clarkson Show.

In November, Rosé personally hosted album listening parties for her fans in Seoul and Tokyo. Official listening parties around the globe were also later organised and held on 4 December. In early December, Rosé guested on Japanese news broadcasts such as TV Asahi's Udo Times and Nippon TV's News Zero. Continuing promotions in South Korea, she appeared on JTBC's Newsroom, You Quiz on the Block, Vogue Korea's What's in My Bag, and Daesung's web show Zip Daesung. She also made an appearance on the Australian radio show Jase & Lauren during the day of the album's release. Shortly after, Rosé commenced promotions in the United Kingdom, providing interviews with BBC Radio 1, Hits Radio, LADbible's Snack Wars, and Capital Breakfast's Very British Day Out.

Rosie merchandise in a Seoul pop-up store.

On 6 December, Melon presented a celebration of Rosé's first full-length record through its new album spotlight service, Melon Spotlight, which offered a comment event to win signed CDs, as well as a variety of exclusive content including interview videos, images, magazines, and handwritten notes. On 9 December, TikTok launched the #rosie campaign to celebrate the album release, offering in-app experiences, a limited-time profile frame mission, and exclusive videos.

South Korean photo studio chain Photoism then released a special Rosie artist frame, with the design made available in all its locations, excluding pop-ups, from 21 January to 31 March 2025. In August, Rosé collaborated with Puma to release a Rosie-themed sports apparel collection, which features a range of 10 pieces inspired by her personal wardrobe staples, including a sporty mesh top, a black miniskirt, and two new Speedcat Premium and Speedcat Ballet sneaker variants.

==== Pop up stores ====
In December 2024, pop-up stores selling the album and limited edition merchandise were open in select locations, including Hyundai's Iconic Pop-up Zone in Yeongdeungpo, Seoul; 54 West Street in Sheung Wan, Hong Kong; and the Barnes & Noble on Fifth Avenue, New York. Throughout the next year, several Rosie pop ups have opened around the globe, including locations in Malaysia, Indonesia, Singapore, China, and France, among others.

=== Singles ===
On 17 October, Rosé revealed the album's lead single "APT.", a collaboration with American singer Bruno Mars, on her social media a day before its official release. The single was released on 18 October to great commercial success, debuting atop both the Billboard Global 200 and the Global Excl. US. This marked Rosé's and Mars' second number-one single on either chart after "On the Ground" and "Die with a Smile", respectively. The song also peaked at number one on South Korea's Circle Digital Chart, the Billboard Japan Hot 100, the New Zealand Singles Chart, and Australia's ARIA Singles Chart, among others. In the United States, "APT." debuted at number eight and later peaked at number three on the Billboard Hot 100, making Rosé the first K-pop female act in history to have a top-ten and top-five entry on the chart.

On 22 November, Rosé released "Number One Girl" as Rosie's second single. The song peaked at number 12 on the Circle Digital Chart and number 29 on the Billboard Global 200. "Toxic Till the End" was released as the third single alongside the album on 6 December. It debuted at number 15 on the Billboard Global 200 and number six on the Global Excl. US, earning Rosé her third top-ten overall on the latter chart. In South Korea, it peaked at number four on the Circle Digital Chart, marking the second top-ten hit from the album.

=== Live performances ===
On 22 November 2024, Rosé presented the first live performance of "APT." with Bruno Mars at the 2024 MAMA Awards in Osaka. She later performed "APT." with Lee Young-ji and "Number One Girl" on The Seasons: Lee Young-ji's Rainbow for the episode aired on 29 November 2024. On 3 December 2024, she appeared on BBC Radio 1's Christmas Live Lounge 2024, performing "APT." and a cover of "Last Christmas" by Wham!. During the episode broadcast on 11 December 2024, Rosé performed a live band medley of her songs "APT." and "Toxic Till the End" on The Tonight Show with Jimmy Fallon.

On 23 January 2025, Rosé performed a three-song set comprising "Stay a Little Longer", "Toxic Till the End", and "APT." at the Gala des Pièces Jaunes 2025 held at the Paris La Défense Arena. A live band performance of "3am", which was filmed at the Channel Street Skatepark in Los Angeles, was posted on YouTube on the same day. Rosé later performed a six-song set, which included the tracks "Toxic Till the End", "3am", "Vampirehollie", "Two Years", "Drinks or Coffee", and "APT.", as a special guest at the Japanese music festival GMO Sonic 2025 held at the Saitama Super Arena on 26 January. On 22 and 25 April, Rosé performed "APT." together with Coldplay as a guest for the band's Music of the Spheres World Tour concerts at Goyang Stadium. On 28 June, she performed the song alongside "Toxic Till the End" and "Dance All Night" as a special guest at Psy's Summer Swag 2025 concert.

Throughout Blackpink's Deadline World Tour, Rosé performed a three-song solo set comprising "APT.", "Toxic Till the End", and a third song of choice from Rosie. On 22 September, Rosé performed "APT." on The Howard Stern Show.

== Critical reception ==
Professional ratings
Aggregate scores
Source	Rating
Metacritic	70/100
Review scores
Source	Rating
AllMusic	3.5/5 stars
Clash	8/10
Financial Times	3/5 stars
IZM	2.5/5 stars
The New York Times	3.5/5 stars
NME	4/5 stars
Pitchfork	5.5/10
Riff Magazine	8/10
Rolling Stone	3.5/5 stars

Rosie generally received positive reviews from critics. At Metacritic, which assigns a normalised rating out of 100 to reviews from mainstream critics, the album has an average score of 70 based on six reviews, indicating "generally favourable reviews". Writing for Clash, Robin Murray favourably labelled Rosie as a "solo triumph" and remarked that the record is full of "towering pop peaks" which cement Rosé's position as a global pop persona. Eleanor Carr of Renowned for Sound likewise wrote that the album tracks are "good enough to stand toe to toe with the best pop coming out this year". Meanwhile, Rolling Stone's Maura Johnston praised the album for its showcase of Rosé's solid songwriting, pop-savvy versatility, and her ability to package her disarming honesty into charming songs that allow for an "inviting listen". NME's Crystal Bell similarly lauded the album's commitment to Rosé's authentic declaration of self, opining the stripped-back approach to be a bold move that trades "K-pop's grandeur for intimate songwriting and emotional candour"; Bell also highlighted Rosé's versatile vocal performance throughout the record.

Thematically, Jason Liphsutz of Billboard commented the album to be a "thoughtfully considered portrait of relationship complications and personal complexities", remarking that the collection "impressively [split] the difference between intimacy and arena-ready pop". Jeff Benjamin of Billboard also defined Rosie as "a mosaic of the messy, beautiful chaos that defines one's twenties," offering a deeper, more open look into Rosé's thoughts than her K-pop releases; he praised the album for letting fans into "Rosé's venting sessions and musical therapy appointments". According to P. Claire Dodson, Sara Delgado, Donya Momenian, and Aiyana Ishmael from Teen Vogue, Rosie is a "cathartic album" that dives into Rosé's insecurities without fear. Stephanee Wang of Paper summarised the record as a "capital-P pop album with shades of intimate Swiftian storytelling and cathartic, soaring hooks [where Rosé] paints a narrative of a love gone wrong".

In a mixed review, Christina Jaleru of the Associated Press wrote the album to be "an emotional rollercoaster easy to empathise with", describing it as "heartfelt, but slightly sleepy". She also observed Rosé's solo material to be sonically different from that of her band, dubbing Rosie's tracks to be "that of a coffee-house dweller with a sideline in romantic drama", in contrast to Blackpink's high energy electro-pop output. South Korean music critic Kim Do-heon noted that while the album follows the popular "formula of recent female singer-songwriters such as Taylor Swift, Olivia Rodrigo, and Sabrina Carpenter," it lacks Rosé's unique identity. Mark Richardson of The Wall Street Journal similarly noted Rosé's vocal versatility in the album as it "settles into an accomplished survey of prominent pop styles", citing the musical influences of Rihanna, Taylor Swift, Billie Eilish, and SZA; however, he further commented that although there was no fault in the musical production, there was difficulty in perceiving Rosé's identity through the album. Alex Ramos of Pitchfork reiterated criticisms of the album's lack of identity and commented on its "dated pop references". In agreement, Financial Times' Ludovic Hunter-Tilney conclusively stated: "These are decent songs, but their generic design detracts from the idea of presenting us with the real Rosé."

== Accolades ==
Awards and nominations for Rosie
Year	Organisation	Award	Result	Ref.
2025	Asian Pop Music Awards	Top 20 Albums of the Year	Won	
2025	Asian Pop Music Awards	People's Choice Award	7th place	
2025	Asian Pop Music Awards	Best Album of the Year	Nominated	
2025	Melon Music Awards	Millions Top 10	Won	
2025	Melon Music Awards	Album of the Year	Nominated	

World records for Rosie
Year	Organisation	Award	Ref.
2024	Guinness World Records	Highest-charting female K-pop artist on the US albums chart	

== Commercial performance ==
Rosie debuted at number two on the Circle Album Chart in South Korea, recording 253,086 units sold in its first week of release. In New Zealand, the album debuted at number three on the New Zealand Albums Chart, while debuting at number one on the New Zealand Aotearoa Albums Chart, which ranks the top twenty best performing albums in New Zealand by New Zealand artists. It became the singer's first top-three entry with a solo album in the country. Overall, Rosé placed seven tracks from Rosie across the Official Aotearoa Music Charts simultaneously, a feat last achieved by L.A.B. in March 2024. In Australia, the album debuted at number two on the ARIA Albums Chart, whilst the album's lead track "APT." remained at number one on the singles chart for a sixth non-consecutive week. It became the highest-charting album by a female K-pop soloist on the chart, until bandmate Jennie tied the achievement three months later with Ruby (2025). The placement was Rosé's third top-two album in Australia after Blackpink's The Album (2020) and Born Pink (2022).

Rosie debuted at number four on the UK Albums Chart, making Rosé the first ever female K-pop soloist to earn a top-five album in the United Kingdom, her third overall, after Blackpink's two top-five albums in the country. In the United States, Rosie debuted at number three on the Billboard 200 with 102,000 album-equivalent units, comprising 70,000 pure album sales, 31,000 streaming equivalent sales, and 1,000 track-equivalent sales. The placement marked it as the highest-ranked album on the chart by a K-pop female soloist. It became Rosé's third top-ten album in the country after Blackpink's previous two albums. According to the International Federation of the Phonographic Industry (IFPI), Rosie was the 19th best-selling album worldwide across all formats and the 15th best-selling album worldwide in streaming in 2025.

== Track listing ==
Rosie standard edition
No.	Title	Writer(s)	Producer(s)	Length
1.	"Number One Girl"	Chae Young Park; Amy Allen; Bruno Mars; Dernst Emile II; Omer Fedi; Carter Lang; Dylan Wiggins	Mars; D'Mile; Fedi; Lang; Wiggins	3:36
2.	"3am"	Park; Allen; Jacob Weinberg; Mark Williams; Raul Cubina	Weinberg; Ojivolta^{[a]}	2:34
3.	"Two Years"	Park; Michael Pollack; Gregory Hein; Jordan K. Johnson; Stefan Johnson; Isaiah Tejada	The Monsters & Strangerz; Tejada^{[a]}	2:48
4.	"Toxic Till the End"	Park; Pollack; Emily Warren; Evan Blair	Blair	2:37
5.	"Drinks or Coffee"	Park; Allen; Fedi; Blake Slatkin; Lang; Wiggins	Fedi; Slatkin; Lang; Wiggins	2:13
6.	"APT." (with Bruno Mars)	Park; Mars; Allen; Philip Lawrence; Christopher "Brody" Brown; Theron Thomas; Henry Walter; Fedi; Rogét Chahayed; Michael Chapman; Nicholas Chinn	Mars; Cirkut; Fedi; Chahayed	2:50
7.	"Gameboy"	Park; Allen; Hein; Williams; Cubina; Rob Bisel	Ojivolta; Bisel	2:47
8.	"Stay a Little Longer"	Park; Sarah Aarons; Andrew Wells	Wells	4:07
9.	"Not the Same"	Park; Allen; Williams; Cubina; Bisel	Ojivolta; Bisel	3:04
10.	"Call It the End"	Park; Warren; Elof Loelv; Pollack; Griff Clawson	Pollack; Clawson	2:21
11.	"Too Bad for Us"	Park; Jason Evigan; Wayne Hector; Gian Stone; Freddy Wexler; Ben Fielding; Dean Ussher	Wexler	3:56
12.	"Dance All Night"	Park; Maureen MacDonald; Greg Kurstin	Kurstin	3:35
Total length:				36:28

Rosie limited LP and digital edition bonus track
No.	Title	Writer(s)	Producer(s)	Length
13.	"Vampirehollie"	Park; Allen; Walter; Fedi	Cirkut; Fedi	2:52
Total length:				39:20

Notes

- ^{^[a]} signifies a co-producer
- "APT." contains an interpolation of "Mickey", written by Michael Chapman and Nicholas Chinn, and performed by Toni Basil.
- "Too Bad for Us" contains an interpolation of "Anchor", written by Ben Fielding and Dean Ussher, and performed by Hillsong Worship.
- Limited Japanese CD editions include an instrumental version of "APT.".
- A limited digital exclusive edition entitled Number One Girl includes "Number One Girl", performed live at KBS The Seasons.
- All tracks except "APT." are stylised in all lowercase.

== Personnel ==
- Rosé – vocals (all tracks), executive producer
- Teddy Park – co-executive producer
- Omer Fedi – guitar, synthesiser (track 6)
- Bruno Mars – vocals (track 6)
- Greg Kurstin – bass, drums, electric guitar, percussion, piano, engineering (track 12)
- Will Quennell – mastering (tracks 1–2, 4, 7, 9, 11)
- Chris Gehringer – mastering (tracks 3, 5–6, 8, 10, 12)
- Serban Ghenea – mixing
- Bryce Bordone – mixing assistance
- Jelli Dorman – vocal engineering (track 1)
- Kuk Harrell – vocal engineering, vocal production (track 1)
- Ben Hogarth – additional engineering (track 1), vocal engineering (tracks 3, 10)
- Bart Schoudel – vocal engineering (tracks 3–4, 8)
- Ojivolta – vocal engineering (tracks 3–4), vocal production (track 8)
- Charles Moinz – engineering (track 6)
- Julian Vasquez – engineering (track 6)
- Julian Burg – engineering (track 12)
- Matt Tuggle – engineering (track 12)
- Alex Resoagli – engineering assistance (track 6)
- Robert Palma – engineering assistance (track 6)

== Charts ==
=== Weekly charts ===
Weekly chart performance for Rosie
Chart (2024–2025)	Peak position
Argentine Albums (CAPIF)	7
Australian Albums (ARIA)	2
Austrian Albums (Ö3 Austria)	8
Belgian Albums (Ultratop Flanders)	15
Belgian Albums (Ultratop Wallonia)	18
Canadian Albums (Billboard)	4
Croatian International Albums (HDU)	9
Dutch Albums (Album Top 100)	14
Finnish Albums (Suomen virallinen lista)	23
French Albums (SNEP)	16
German Albums (Offizielle Top 100)	8
Greek Albums (IFPI)	39
Hungarian Physical Albums (MAHASZ)	13
Irish Albums (Official Charts)	26
Italian Albums (FIMI)	17
Japanese Albums (Oricon)	10
Japanese Combined Albums (Oricon)	3
Japanese Hot Albums (Billboard Japan)	3
Lithuanian Albums (AGATA)	10
New Zealand Albums (RMNZ)	3
Norwegian Albums (VG-lista)	14
Polish Albums (ZPAV)	12
Portuguese Albums (AFP)	11
Scottish Albums (Official Charts)	10
South Korean Albums (Circle)	2
Spanish Albums (PROMUSICAE)	14
Swedish Albums (Sverigetopplistan)	17
Swiss Albums (Schweizer Hitparade)	8
UK Albums (Official Charts)	4
US Billboard 200	3

=== Monthly charts ===
Monthly chart performance for Rosie
Chart (2024)	Peak position
Japanese Albums (Oricon)	22
South Korean Albums (Circle)	3

=== Year-end charts ===
2024 year-end chart performance for Rosie
Chart (2024)	Position
South Korean Albums (Circle)	50

2025 year-end chart performance for Rosie
Chart (2025)	Position
Australian Albums (ARIA)	69
Canadian Albums (Billboard)	46
French Albums (SNEP)	58
German Albums (Offizielle Top 100)	93
Global Albums (IFPI)	19
Japanese Hot Albums (Billboard Japan)	13
New Zealand Aotearoa Albums (RMNZ)	5
US Billboard 200	112

== Certifications and sales ==
Certifications and sales for Rosie
Region	Certification	Certified units/sales
Canada (Music Canada)	Gold	40,000^{‡}
France (SNEP)	Gold	50,000^{‡}
Japan	—	25,278
New Zealand (RMNZ)	Platinum	15,000^{‡}
South Korea (KMCA)	2× Platinum	647,975
United Kingdom (BPI)	Silver	60,000^{‡}
United States	—	82,000
^{‡} Sales+streaming figures based on certification alone.

== Release history ==
Release dates and formats for Rosie
Region	Date	Format	Label	Ref.
Various	6 December 2024	CD; vinyl LP; cassette; digital download; streaming	The Black Label; Atlantic	

== See also ==
- List of certified albums in South Korea
- List of K-pop albums on the Billboard charts
- List of UK top-ten albums in 2024
