= BB Girls discography =

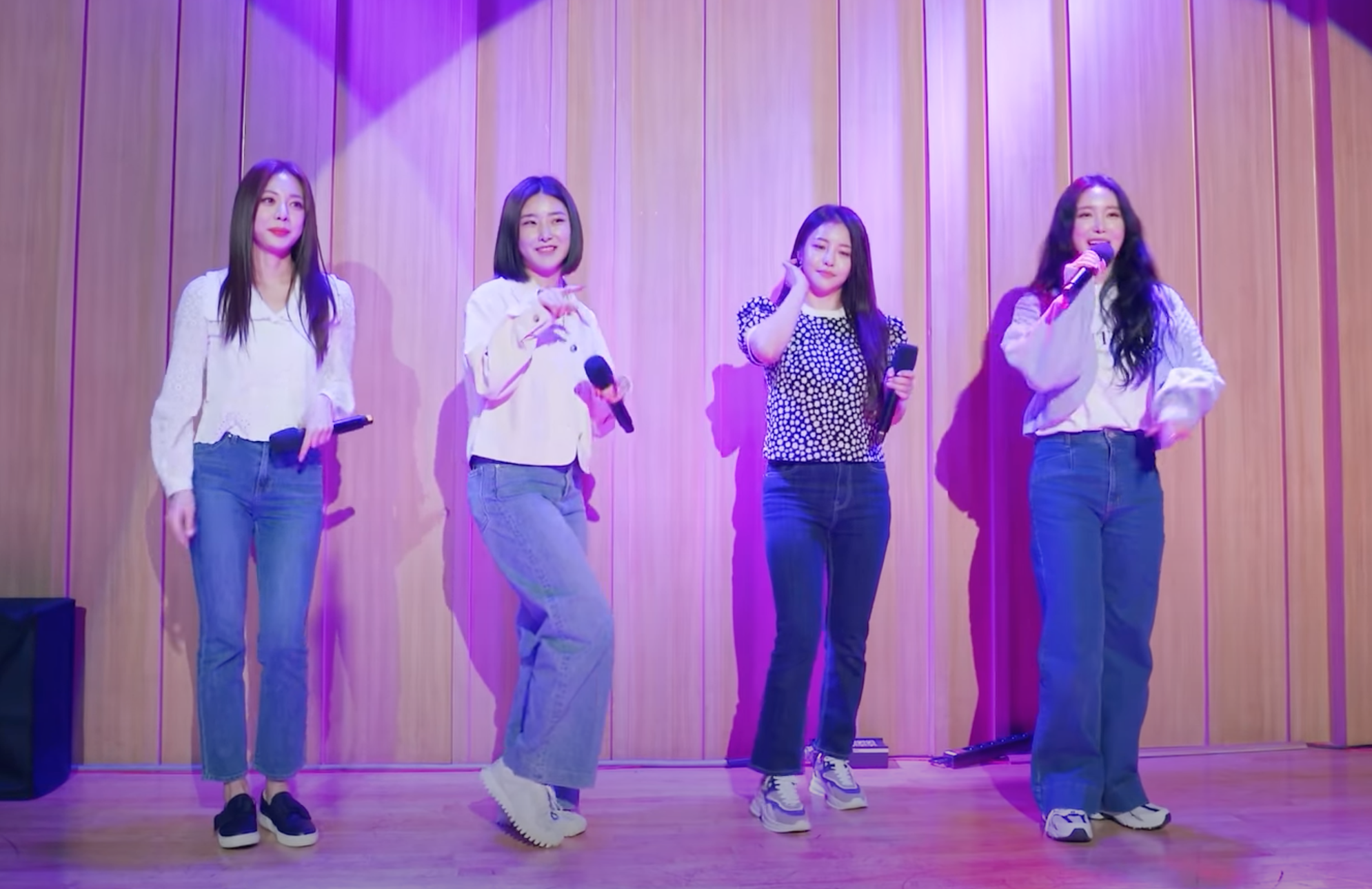
- BB Girls in March 2021
- EPs: 6
- Compilation albums: 1
- Singles: 17
- Music videos: 20
- Reissues: 1
- Single albums: 3

The discography of South Korean girl group BB Girls consists of one compilation album, six extended plays, one reissue, three single albums, and seventeen singles (including two as featured artists).

== Compilation albums ==
Title	Album details
Brave Girls
Brave Girls Best Album	Released: August 20, 2023; Label: Brave Entertainment; Formats: CD, digital download, streaming; Track list: 1. Do You Know (아나요) (New Ver.); 2. Easily (툭하면) (New Ver.) (feat. Skull); 3. High Heels (하이힐) (New Ver.); 4. Nowadays You (요즘 너) (New Ver.); 5. Yoo Hoo (유후 (우린 아직 여름)) (New Ver.); 6. Rollin' (롤린) (New Ver.); 7. We Ride (운전만해) (New Ver.); 8. Chi Mat Ba Ram (치맛바람) (New Ver.)

== Extended plays ==
Title	EP details	Peak chart positions	Sales
Title	EP details	KOR	Sales
Brave Girls
Back to da Future	Released: July 29, 2011; Label: Brave Entertainment; Formats: CD, digital download, streaming; Track list: 1. Back to da Future; 2. Easily (툭하면) (feat. Skull); 3. When It Rains (비가 내리면); 4. It Hurts So Much (너무 아파) (feat. Maboos of Electroboyz) (Eunyoung solo); 5. Do You Know (아나요) (Acoustic Remix Ver.); 6. Easily (툭하면) (Inst.)	14	KOR: 3,484
Re-Issue	Released: February 22, 2012; Label: Brave Entertainment; Formats: CD, digital download, streaming; Track list: 1. B'Girls Are Back; 2. Nowadays, You (요즘 너); 3. Without a Word (말 없이); 4. Nowadays, You (요즘 너) (Remix ver.); 5. Nowadays, You (요즘 너) (Inst.)	14	KOR: 2,865
High Heels	Released: June 27, 2016; Label: Brave Entertainment; Formats: CD, digital download, streaming	22	KOR: 1,048
Rollin'	Released: March 7, 2017; Label: Brave Entertainment; Formats: CD, digital download, streaming	30	KOR: 1,091
Summer Queen	Released: June 17, 2021; Label: Brave Entertainment; Formats: CD, digital download, streaming	3	KOR: 75,663
Thank You	Released: March 14, 2022; Label: Brave Entertainment; Formats: CD, digital download, streaming	11	KOR: 28,591

== Reissues ==
Title	Album details	Peak chart positions	Sales
Title	Album details	KOR	Sales
Brave Girls
After 'We Ride'	Released: August 23, 2021; Label: Brave Entertainment; Formats: CD, digital download, streaming	14	KOR: 15,404

== Single albums ==
Title	Album details	Peak chart positions	Sales
Title	Album details	KOR	Sales
Brave Girls
The Difference	Released: April 7, 2011; Label: Brave Entertainment; Formats: CD, digital download, streaming; Track list: 1. Intro (Ain't Nobody Like Brave Girls); 2. So Sexy; 3. Do You Know (아나요); 4. So Sexy (Inst.)	2	KOR: 11,676
BB Girls
One More Time	Released: August 3, 2023; Label: Warner Music Korea; Formats: PLVE, digital download, streaming	22	KOR: 11,662
Love 2	Released: January 15, 2025; Label: GLG, NHN Bugs; Formats: Poca, digital download, streaming	16	KOR: 7,448
Body Wave	Released: July 16, 2026; Label: GLG, Kakao Entertainment; Formats: Poca, digital download, streaming	38	KOR: 3,717

== Singles ==
=== As lead artist ===
Title	Year	Peak chart positions				Sales (DL)	Album
Title	Year	KOR	KOR Hot (Note: Includes the Billboard K-pop Hot 100 (defunct as of 2022), and South Korea Songs, part of Billboard's Hits of the World (2022 onwards).)	US World	WW Excl. US	Sales (DL)	Album
Brave Girls
"Do You Know" (아나요)	2011	19	—	—	—	KOR: 428,789	The Difference
"Easily" (툭하면) (feat. Skull)	2011	38	67	—	—	KOR: 698,375	Back to da Future
"Nowadays, You" (요즘 너)	2012	21	18	—	—	KOR: 660,397	Re-Issue
"For You" (Note: "For You" is sung by Yujin and Hyeran, following Eunyoung, Seoa and Yejin's departures from the group.) (포유)	2013	50	61	—	—	KOR: 50,585	Non-album single
"Deepened" (변했어)	2016	131	—	14	—	KOR: 10,942	High Heels
"High Heels" (하이힐)	2016	133	—	—	—	KOR: 12,034	High Heels
"Yoo-hoo" (유후 (우린 아직 여름))	2016	—	—	—	—	KOR: 3,591	Non-album single
"Rollin'" (롤린)	2017	1	1	13	189	—N/a	Rollin'
"We Ride" (운전만해)	2020	4	4	—	—	—N/a	Non-album single
"Chi Mat Ba Ram" (치맛바람)	2021	3	2	—	—	—N/a	Summer Queen
"After We Ride" (술버릇 (운전만해그후))	2021	51	62	—	—	—N/a	After 'We Ride'
"Thank You"	2022	39	—	—	—	—N/a	Thank You
"Goodbye"	2023	— (Note: "Goodbye" did not enter the Circle Digital Chart, but appeared at number 25 on the component Circle Download Chart.)	—	—	—	—N/a	Non-album single
BB Girls
"One More Time"	2023	— (Note: "One More Time" did not enter the Circle Digital Chart, but appeared at number 31 on the component Circle Download Chart.)	—	—	—	—N/a	One More Time
"Love 2"	2025	— (Note: "Love 2" did not enter the Circle Digital Chart, but appeared at number 21 on the component Circle Download Chart.)	—	—	—	—N/a	Love 2
"Body Wave"	2026	— (Note: "Body Wave" did not enter the Circle Digital Chart, but appeared at number 33 on the component Circle Download Chart.)	—	—	—	—N/a	Body Wave
"—" denotes releases that did not chart or were not released in that region.

=== As featured artist ===
Title	Year	Peak chart positions		Sales (DL)	Album
Title	Year	KOR	KOR Hot	Sales (DL)	Album
"Passing of the Year" (올해가 가고) (Electroboyz, Brave Girls, Big Star & Park Soo Jin)	2013	105	90	KOR: 18,239	Passing of the Year (Prod. Brave Brothers)
"Summer Taste" (with Rain, Monsta X and Ateez) (Note: Credited as Brave Girls but only features members Yujeong and Yuna.)	2021	— (Note: "Summer Taste" did not enter the Gaon Digital Chart, but appeared at number 54 on the component Download Chart.)	—	—N/a	Taste of Korea
"—" denotes releases that did not chart or were not released in that region.

=== Promotional singles ===
Title	Year	Peak chart positions	Album
Title	Year	KOR	Album
"Summer by Myself (Piano Ver.)" (나 혼자 여름)	2021	— (Note: "Summer by Myself (Piano Ver.)" did not enter the Gaon Digital Chart top 200, but peaked at number 81 on the component Gaon Download Chart.)	After 'We Ride'
"Red Sun" (with Lotte Department Store)	2021	— (Note: "Red Sun" did not enter the Gaon Digital Chart top 200, but debuted and peaked at number 42 on the component Gaon Download Chart.)	Song For You Project Vol.2
"How Come" (어쩌다 2) (Note: Remake of Brown Eyed Girls song.)	2022	— (Note: "How Come" did not enter the Gaon Digital Chart top 200, but peaked at number 27 on the component Gaon Download Chart.)	Non-album single
"Shiny World" (샤이니 월드)	2023	— (Note: "Shiny World" did not enter the Circle Digital Chart top 200, but peaked at number 147 on the component Circle Download Chart.)	Bastions OST Part.3
"—" denotes releases that did not chart or were not released in that region.

=== Compilation appearances ===
Title	Year	Peak chart positions		Album
Title	Year	KOR	US World	Album
"Mapo Terminal" (마포종점)	2016	—	—	Immortal Songs: Singing the Legend (Park Chun-Seok 1st)
"It's a Fireball" (불놀이야)	2021	—	—	Immortal Songs: Singing the Legend (Seo-beom Hong - Gab-kyung Jo Kang Jin - Hyo-sun Kim Part 2)
"Chi Mat Ba Ram+Rollin' - Remix" (치맛바람+롤린 (Remix))	2022	—	—	<Queendom 2> Part.1-2
"MVSK - Remix"	2022	— (Note: "MVSK - Remix" did not enter the Gaon Digital Chart top 200, but peaked at number 78 on the component Gaon Download Chart.)	—	<Queendom 2> Part.2-1
"Tell Me Now" (탐이 나) (with Loona as "Queen is Me") (Note: Credited as Brave Girls but only features member Eunji.)	2022	— (Note: "Tell Me Now" did not enter the Gaon Digital Chart top 200, but peaked at number 85 on the component Gaon Download Chart.)	11	<Queendom 2> Position Unit Battle Part.1-2
"Red Sun - Remix"	2022	— (Note: "Red Sun - Remix" did not enter the Gaon Digital Chart top 200, but peaked at number 87 on the component Gaon Download Chart.)	—	<Queendom 2> FANtastic Queendom 1-2
"Whistle"	2022	— (Note: "Whistle" did not enter the Gaon Digital Chart top 200, but peaked at number 91 on the component Gaon Download Chart.)	—	<Queendom 2> Final
"Epilogue" (지나온) (with Hyolyn, Seola of WJSN, Eunha of Viviz, HeeJin of Loona, and Yeseo of Kep1er) (Note: Credited as Brave Girls but only features member Yuna.)	2022	—	—	<Queendom 2> JINAON (Epilogue)
"—" denotes releases that did not chart or were not released in that region.

== Other charted songs ==
Title	Year	Peak chart positions		Album
Title	Year	KOR	KOR Hot	Album
"Help Me"	2016	— (Note: "Help Me" did not enter the Gaon Digital Chart top 200, but appeared at number 116 on the component Gaon Download Chart.)	—	High Heels
"Rollin (New Version)" (롤린 (New Version))	2018	163	—	Non-album singles
"Pool Party" (feat. E-Chan)	2021	112	39	Summer Queen
"Summer by Myself" (나 혼자 여름)	2021	123	99	Summer Queen
"Fever" (토요일 밤의 열기)	2021	134	—	Summer Queen
"Chi Mat Ba Ram" (English version)	2021	— (Note: "Chi Mat Ba Ram" (English version) did not enter the Gaon Digital Chart top 200, but appeared at number 33 on the component Gaon Download Chart.)	—	Summer Queen
"Chi Mat Ba Ram (Acoustic Ver.)" (치맛바람)	2021	— (Note: "Chi Mat Ba Ram (Acoustic Ver.)" did not enter the Gaon Digital Chart top 200, but peaked at number 69 on the component Gaon Download Chart.)	—	After 'We Ride'
"Fever (Remix)" (토요일 밤의 열기)	2021	— (Note: "Fever (Remix)" did not enter the Gaon Digital Chart top 200, but peaked at number 70 on the component Gaon Download Chart.)	—	After 'We Ride'
"You and I" (우리끼리)	2022	— (Note: "You and I" did not enter the Gaon Digital Chart top 200, but peaked at number 37 on the component Gaon Download Chart.)	—	Thank You
"Love Is Gone" (물거품)	2022	— (Note: "Love Is Gone" did not enter the Gaon Digital Chart top 200, but peaked at number 36 on the component Gaon Download Chart.)	—	Thank You
"Can I Love You"	2022	— (Note: "Can I Love You" did not enter the Gaon Digital Chart top 200, but peaked at number 41 on the component Gaon Download Chart.)	—	Thank You
"Thank You (Remix)"	2022	— (Note: "Thank You (Remix)" did not enter the Gaon Digital Chart top 200, but peaked at number 70 on the component Gaon Download Chart.)	—	Thank You
"Lemonade"	2023	— (Note: "Lemonade" did not enter the Circle Digital Chart, but peaked at number 92 on the component Circle Download Chart.)	—	One More Time
"—" denotes releases that did not chart or were not released in that region.

== Videography ==
=== Music videos ===
Title	Year	Director(s)	Ref.
"Do You Know"	2011	Unknown	
"So Sexy"	2011	Unknown	
"Easily"	2011	Kim Kwang-eun	
"Nowadays, You"	2012	Joe Brown	
"Deepened"	2016	Joo Hee-sun	
"High Heels"	2016	Jo Soo-hyun	
"Yoo Hoo"	2016	Joe Brown	
"Rollin'"	2017	Lim Jae-kyung	
"Rollin' (New Version)"	2018	BRICK	
"We Ride"	2020	Kang Mingi (aarch.film)	
"High Heels 2021 ver"	2021	Elcanto	
"Red Sun"	2021	Lotte world	
"Chi Mat Ba Ram"	2021	Yoo Sung-kyun (SUNNYVISUAL)	
"Pool Party"	2021	Yoo Sung-kyun (SUNNYVISUAL)	
"Summer Taste"	2021	Unknown	
"After We Ride"	2021	Yoo Sung-kyun (SUNNYVISUAL)	
"Thank You"	2022	Yoo Sung-kyun (SUNNYVISUAL)	
"Shiny World"	2023	Unknown	
"One More Time"	2023	Junyoung Yu (STUDIO SACCHARIN)	
"Love 2"	2025	Jo Seong-min	
"Body Wave"	2026	Bok (815 Video)	
