= Don't Cry (Candy Shop song) =

Single by Candy Shop

from the EP Girls Don't Cry
- Language: Korean
- Released: June 7, 2024
- Genre: K-pop
- Length: 2:44
- Label: Brave; Kakao
- Composers: Brave Brothers; Red Cookie; Youha
- Lyricists: Brave Brothers; Youha

Candy Shop singles chronology
"Good Girl" (2024)	"Don't Cry" (2024)	"Tumbler (Hot & Cold)" (2024)

Music video
- "Don't Cry" on YouTube

"Don't Cry" is a song recorded by South Korean girl group Candy Shop for their second extended play Girls Don't Cry. It was released as the EP's lead single by Brave Entertainment on June 7, 2024.

== Background and release ==
On June 3, 2024, Brave Entertainment announced that Candy Shop would be releasing their second extended play, Girls Don't Cry, on June 12. Three days later, the track listing was released through the highlight medley teaser video with "Don't Cry" and "Tumbler (Hot & Cold)" announced as the singles. On June 7, the music video was released. The extended play was released alongside the song on June 12.

== Composition ==
"Don't Cry" was written and composed by Brave Brothers and Youha with Red Cookie participating in the composition and arrangement. It was described as a song with lyrics "that conveys comfort to those in difficult situations". "Don't Cry" was composed in the key of F minor, with a tempo of 115 beats per minute.

== Commercial performance ==
"Don't Cry" debuted at number 108 on South Korea's Circle Download Chart in the chart issue dated June 9–15, 2024.

== Promotion ==
Following the release of "Don't Cry", Candy Shop performed on three music programs in the first week of promotion: Mnet's M Countdown on June 13, KBS's Music Bank on June 14, and MBC's Show! Music Core on June 15. In the second week, they performed on three music programs: Music Bank on June 21, Show! Music Core on June 22, and SBS's Inkigayo on June 23.

== Charts ==
Chart performance for "Don't Cry"
Chart (2024)	Peak position
South Korea Downloads (Circle)	108

== Release history ==
Release history for "Don't Cry"
Region	Date	Format	Label
Various	June 7, 2024	Digital download; streaming	Brave; Kakao
