= Girls Don't Cry (EP) =

- Digital cover

EP by Candy Shop
- Released: June 12, 2024
- Length: 11:06
- Language: Korean
- Label: Brave; Kakao

Candy Shop chronology
#Hashtag (2024)	Girls Don't Cry (2024)

Singles from Girls Don't Cry
- 1. "Don't Cry" Released: June 12, 2024; 2. "Tumbler (Hot & Cold)" Released: June 12, 2024

Girls Don't Cry is the second extended play by South Korean girl group Candy Shop. It was released by Brave Entertainment on June 12, 2024, and contains four tracks including two singles: "Don't Cry" and "Tumbler (Hot & Cold)".

== Background and release ==
On June 3, 2024, Brave Entertainment announced that Candy Shop would be releasing their second extended play titled Girls Don't Cry on June 12. Three days later, the track listing was released through the highlight medley teaser video with "Don't Cry" and "Tumbler (Hot & Cold)" announced as the singles. On June 7, the music video for "Don't Cry" was released. The extended play was released alongside the music video for "Tumbler (Hot & Cold)" on June 12.

== Commercial performance ==
Girls Don't Cry debuted at number 37 on South Korea's Circle Album Chart in the chart issue dated June 9–15, 2024.

== Track listing ==
Track listing for Girls Don't Cry
No.	Title	Lyrics	Music	Arrangement	Length
1.	"Don't Cry"	Brave Brothers; Youha	Brave Brothers; Red Cookie; Youha	Red Cookie	2:44
2.	"Tumbler (Hot & Cold)"	Brave Brothers; Maboos	Brave Brothers; Maboos; JS	JS	2:56
3.	"Welcome To My World"	Babylon	JS; Babylon	JS	2:47
4.	"Good Girl" (Remix)	Brave Brothers	Brave Brothers; Red Cookie	Red Cookie	2:39
Total length:					11:06

== Charts ==
Weekly chart performance for Girls Don't Cry
Chart (2024)	Peak position
South Korean Albums (Circle)	37

== Sales ==
Overall sales for Girls Don't Cry
Region	Sales
South Korea	4,282

== Release history ==
Release history for Girls Don't Cry
Region	Date	Format	Label
South Korea	June 12, 2024	CD	Brave; Kakao
Various	June 12, 2024	Digital download; streaming	Brave; Kakao
