= Summer Queen =

- Digital cover

EP by Brave Girls
- Released: June 17, 2021
- Recorded: 2021
- Length: 16:47
- Languages: Korean, English
- Label: Brave

Brave Girls chronology
Rollin' (2017)	Summer Queen (2021)	Thank You (2022)

Singles from Summer Queen
- 1. "Chi Mat Ba Ram" Released: June 17, 2021

Repackaged album cover

Singles from After 'We Ride'
- 1. "Summer by Myself (Piano Version)" Released: July 9, 2021; 2. "After We Ride" Released: August 23, 2021

Summer Queen is the fifth extended play (EP) by South Korean girl group Brave Girls. It was released by Brave Entertainment on June 17, 2021. The album marks the group's first album release since their 2017 extended play Rollin'. The lead single "Chi Mat Ba Ram" was released in conjunction with the EP.

== Background and release ==
Following the sudden success of the group's 2017 single "Rollin'" in early 2021, Brave Entertainment stated that the group would release new material during the summer. On June 7, 2021, Brave Entertainment unveiled that the group's fifth extended play, titled Summer Queen would be released on June 17, marking their first new material since "We Ride" in August 2020, and first EP release single Rollin' in March 2017.

On June 29, 2021, The Brave Entertainment CEO purposely 'leaked' a snippet of the Chi Mat Ba Ram (Acoustic Version). This would end up being featured on the repackaged album as its second track. On July 9, 2021, Brave Girls released the Piano Version of Summer By Myself as a standalone single. This was later added to the repackaged album as the fourth and final track. On August 4, 2021, Brave Entertainment confirmed that Brave Girls would be releasing a repackaged album, but could not give more details at the time. On August 8, 2021, Brave Girls officially announced the plans to release a repackage of the album on their official Twitter. The Repackage, titled After 'We Ride', was released on August 23, 2021, with the lead single of the same name, as well as an accompanying music video.

== Track listing ==
Summer Queen track listing
No.	Title	Lyrics	Music	Arrangement	Length
1.	"Chi Mat Ba Ram" (치맛바람; lit. Swish of a Skirt)	Brave Brothers; Chakun	Brave Brothers; Chakun; Red Cookie	Red Cookie	3:37
2.	"Pool Party" (featuring E-Chan of DKB)	Brave Brothers; Maboos	Brave Brothers; JS; Maboos	JS	3:12
3.	"Summer by Myself" (나 혼자 여름)	Brave Brothers; Chakun	Brave Brothers; Red Cookie	Red Cookie	2:54
4.	"Fever" (토요일 밤의 열기; lit.: Saturday Night Fever)	Maboos	JS; Maboos	JS	3:25
5.	"Chi Mat Ba Ram" (English version)	Brave Brothers; Chakun	Brave Brothers; Chakun; Red Cookie	Red Cookie	3:37
Total length:					16:47

After 'We Ride' track listing
No.	Title	Lyrics	Music	Arrangement	Length
1.	"After We Ride" (술버릇 (운전만해 그후); lit. Drinking Habits (After We Ride))	Brave Brothers; Maboos	Brave Brothers; Maboos; JS	JS	3:32
2.	"Chi Mat Ba Ram" (acoustic version)	Brave Brothers; Chakun	Brave Brothers; Chakun; Red Cookie	Red Cookie	3:45
3.	"Fever" (remix)	Maboos	JS; Maboos	JS	3:31
4.	"Summer by Myself" (piano version)	Brave Brothers; Chakun	Brave Brothers; Red Cookie	Red Cookie	3:09
Total length:					13:57

== Awards and nominations ==
Award and nominations for Summer Queen
Year	Organization	Award	Result	Ref.
2021	Melon Music Awards	Album of the Year	Nominated	
2021	Mnet Asian Music Awards	Album of the Year	Longlisted	
2022	Seoul Music Awards	Bonsang Award	Won	

== Charts ==
=== Weekly charts ===
Chart (2021)	Peak position
South Korean Albums (Gaon)	3

=== Monthly charts ===
Chart (2021)	Peak position
South Korean Albums (Gaon)	14

== Certification and sales ==
Region	Certification	Certified units/sales
South Korea	—	75,663

== Release history ==
Country	Date	Label	Format	Ref.
Various	June 17, 2021	Brave Entertainment	CD; Digital download; streaming	
