= Thank You (Brave Girls song) =

Single by Brave Girls

from the EP Thank You
- Language: Korean
- Released: March 14, 2022
- Genre: Dance pop; disco funk
- Length: 3:15
- Label: Brave; Kakao
- Composers: Brave Brothers; Maboos; JS
- Lyricists: Brave Brothers; Maboos

Brave Girls singles chronology
"After We Ride" (2021)	"Thank You" (2022)	"Goodbye" (2023)

Music video
- "Thank You" on YouTube

"Thank You" is a song recorded by South Korean girl group Brave Girls for their sixth extended play of the same name. It was released as the extended play's lead single by Brave Entertainment on March 14, 2022.

== Background and release ==
On March 1, 2022, Brave Entertainment announced Brave Girls would be making their comeback on March 14. Two days later, it was announced that Brave Girls would be releasing their sixth extended play titled Thank You. The promotional schedule was also released in the same announcement. On March 4, the track listing was released with "Thank You" announced as the lead single. Five days later, the highlight medley teaser video was released. The music video teaser was released on March 10 and 11.

== Composition ==
"Thank You" was described as a retro dance pop and disco funk song that "contains exciting rhythm and addictive melodies." "Thank You" was composed in the key of A-flat minor, with a tempo of 122 beats per minute.

== Commercial performance ==
"Thank You" debuted at number 39 on South Korea's Gaon Digital Chart in the chart issue dated March 13–19, 2022; on its component charts, the song debuted at number four on the Gaon Download Chart, number 99 on the Gaon Streaming Chart, and number 27 on the Gaon BGM Chart.

== Promotion ==
On March 12, 2022, Brave Entertainment announced that the extended play's showcase event, originally scheduled for March 14, was postponed after Minyoung, Yujeong, and Eunji were diagnosed with COVID-19, the event was held on March 23 where the group introduce the extended play and its song including "Thank You". The group subsequently performed on four music programs: Mnet's M Countdown on March 24, KBS's Music Bank on March 25, MBC's Show! Music Core on March 26, and SBS's Inkigayo on March 27.

== Charts ==
=== Weekly charts ===
Weekly chart performance for "Thank You"
Chart (2022)	Peak position
South Korea (Gaon)	39

=== Monthly charts ===
Monthly chart performance for "Thank You"
Chart (2022)	Position
South Korea (Gaon)	126

== Release history ==
Release history for "Thank You"
Region	Date	Format	Label
Various	March 14, 2022	Digital download; streaming	Brave; Kakao
