= Hashtag (EP) =

Hashtag#
- Digital cover

EP by Candy Shop
- Released: March 27, 2024
- Length: 9:13
- Language: Korean
- Label: Brave

Singles from Hashtag#
- 1. "Good Girl" Released: March 27, 2024

Hashtag# is the debut extended play by South Korean girl group Candy Shop. It was released by Brave Entertainment on March 27, 2024, and contains four tracks including the lead single "Good Girl".

== Background and release ==
On January 12, 2024, Brave Entertainment announced that it would be debuting a new girl group called Candy Shop, the first since Brave Girls in 2011. On February 18, a dance performance video for "Hashtag#" was released. On March 11, Brave Entertainment confirmed that Candy Shop would debut with the extended play Hashtag# on March 27. Three days later, it was announced that the lead single would be titled "Good Girl". On March 18, the track listing was released. The first music teaser video for "Good Girl" was released on March 21, followed by the album track's audio teasers a day later. On March 26, the second music teaser video for "Good Girl" was released. The extended play was released alongside the music video for "Good Girl" on March 27.

== Promotion ==
Prior to the release of Hashtag#, on March 27, 2024, Candy Shop held a live showcase aimed at introducing the extended play and its songs.

== Track listing ==
Track listing for Hashtag#
No.	Title	Lyrics	Music	Arrangement	Length
1.	"Hashtag#"	Maboos	Maboos; JS	JS	1:29
2.	"Good Girl"	Brave Brothers	Brave Brothers; Red Cookie	Red Cookie	2:39
3.	"No Fake"	Maboos	Maboos; JS	JS	2:42
4.	"Candy#"	Brave Brothers; Chakun; Maboos	Brave Brothers; JS; Chakun	JS	2:23
Total length:					9:13

== Release history ==
Release history for Hashtag#
Region	Date	Format	Label
South Korea	March 27, 2024	CD	Brave
Various	March 27, 2024	Digital download; streaming	Brave
