= Candy Shop (group) =

South Korean girl group

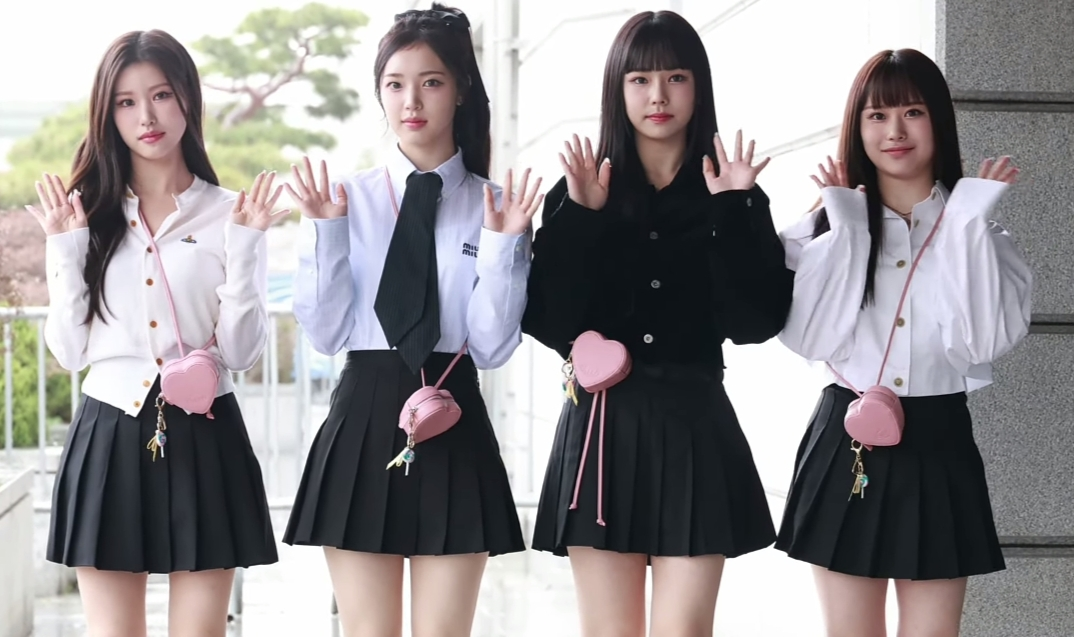
- Candy Shop in March 2024; L–R: Soram, Sui, Sarang, Yuina

Background information
- Origin: Seoul, South Korea
- Genres: K-pop
- Years active: 2024–present
- Label: Brave
- Members: Soram; Yuina; Sui; Sarang; Julia
- Website: brave-candyshop.com

Candy Shop (Korean: 캔디샵) is a South Korean girl group formed by Brave Entertainment. The group is composed of five members: Soram, Yuina, Sui, Sarang, and Julia. The group debuted on March 27, 2024, with the extended play Hashtag#.

== Name ==
The name of the group, Candy Shop, combines the words "candy" symbolizing the concept of "let's catch and draw youth" and "shop" signifiying "the space connecting the members to their listeners".

== History ==
=== 2024–present: Introduction, debut with ''Hashtag#'', and member changes ===
On January 12, 2024, Brave Entertainment announced that it would be debuting a new girl group called Candy Shop, the first since Brave Girls in 2011. The members were revealed from February 14 to 17 (in order: Sui, Sarang, Soram, and Yuina). On February 18, a dance performance video for unreleased song "Hashtag#" was released. On March 27, the group made their debut with the released of extended play Hashtag# and the single "Good Girl".

On May 9, Brave Entertainment announced that Yuina would temporarily halt her activities due to health-related issues. In addition, Julia was added to the group on May 13 to "maintain a four-member lineup" prior to releasing new record in June. On June 12, the group released their second extended play Girls Don't Cry and the singles "Don't Cry" and "Tumbler (Hot & Cold)".

== Members ==
- Soram (소람) – leader, vocalist
- Sui (수이) – dancer
- Sarang (사랑) – rapper
- Julia (줄리아) – vocalist

=== Inactive ===
- Yuina (유이나) – vocalist, dancer

== Discography ==
=== Extended plays ===
List of extended plays, showing selected details, selected chart positions, and sales figures
Title	Details	Peak chart positions	Sales
Title	Details	KOR	Sales
Hashtag#	Released: March 27, 2024; Label: Brave Entertainment; Formats: CD, digital download, streaming	58	KOR: 1,290
Girls Don't Cry	Released: June 12, 2024; Label: Brave Entertainment; Formats: CD, digital download, streaming	37	KOR: 6,316

=== Singles ===
List of singles, showing year released, selected chart positions, and name of the album
Title	Year	Peak chart positions	Album
Title	Year	KOR Down.	Album
"Good Girl"	2024	156	Hashtag#
"Don't Cry"	2024	108	Girls Don't Cry
"Tumbler (Hot & Cold)"	2024	184	Girls Don't Cry
"Tip-Toe"	2025	—	Non-album singles

== Videography ==
=== Music videos ===
Song title	Year	Director(s)	Ref.
"Good Girl"	2024	Brick (Line Production)	
"Don't Cry"	2024	Unknown	
