= List of Inkigayo Chart winners (2021) =

Inkigayo Chart winners (2021)

Highlights
- Artist(s) with most wins: IU (9)
- Song with highest score: "Savage" by Aespa (10,699)

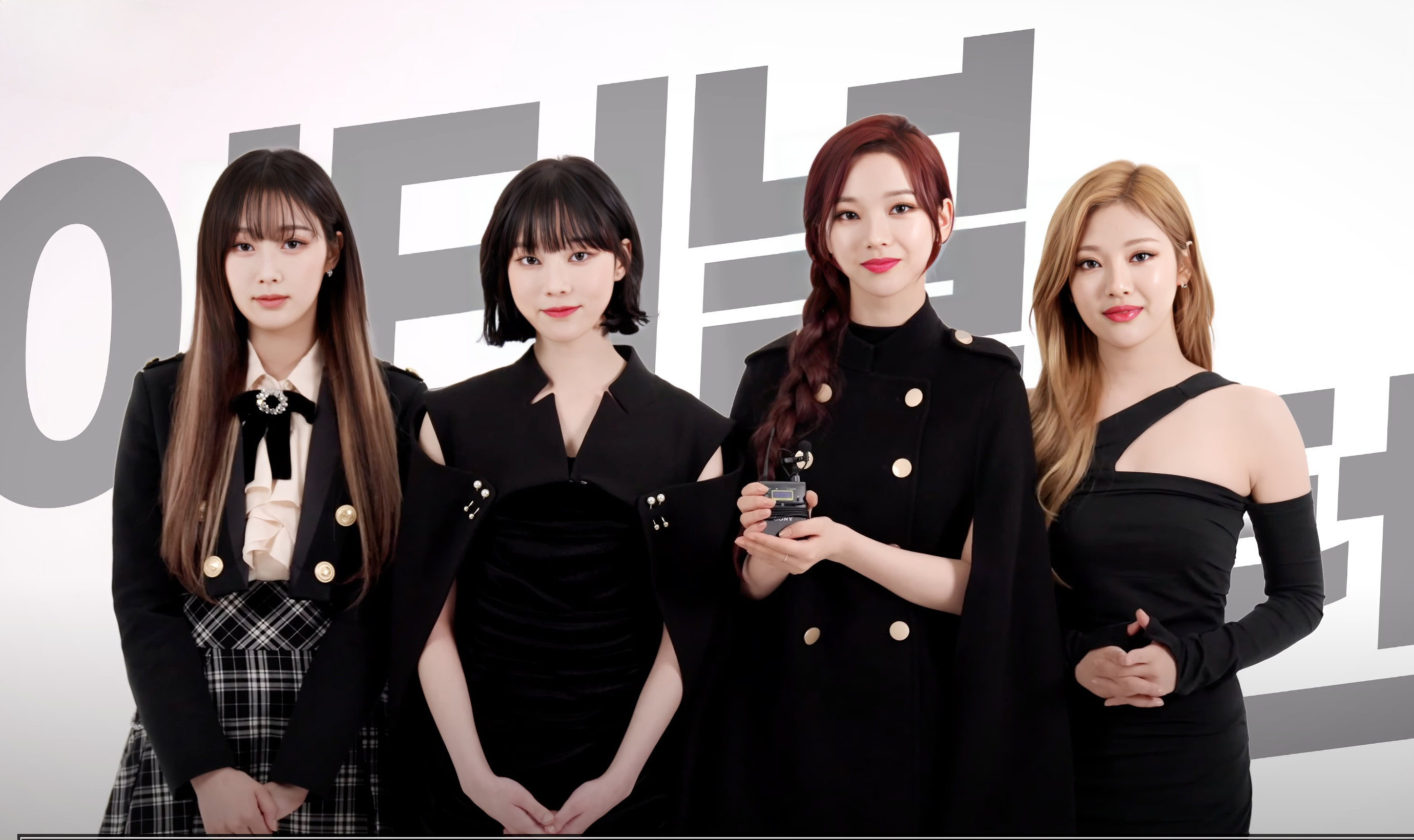
Aespa received their first ever music show win with their Inkigayo trophy for "Black Mamba". Their succeeding single "Savage" earned the highest score of 2021, with 10,699 points on the October 17 broadcast, and achieved the group's first Triple Crown.

The Inkigayo Chart is a music program record chart on Seoul Broadcasting System (SBS) that gives an award to the best-performing single of the week in South Korea. In 2021, the chart measured digital performance in domestic online music services (5,500 points), social media via YouTube views (3,000 points), album sales (1,000 points), network on-air time (1,000 points), and advanced viewer votes (500 points) in its ranking methodology, for a total of 11,000 points. Beginning on January 24, Inkigayo implemented real-time voting via the Starpass mobile app accounting for an additional 500 points. Songs that spend three weeks at number one are awarded a Triple Crown and are removed from the chart and ineligible to win again. Since October 20, 2019, Monsta X member Minhyuk, NCT member Jaehyun, and April member Lee Na-eun had been hosting the show and continued to do so till February 28, 2021. Treasure's Jihoon, Riize's Sungchan, and Iz*One's An Yu-jin were announced as new hosts of the show the following week.

In 2021, 27 singles ranked number one on the chart and 18 acts received an award trophy for this feat. Nine songs collected trophies for three weeks and earned a Triple Crown: Twice's "I Can't Stop Me", IU's "Celebrity", "Lilac" and "Strawberry Moon", Brave Girls' "Rollin'", BTS' "Butter" and "Permission to Dance", Lee Mu-jin's "Traffic Light", and Aespa's "Savage". The first number one of the year was "I Can't Stop Me" by Twice marking its third week at number one and achieving a triple crown. Eight artists had their first number one song on the chart in 2021. Girl group Aespa had their first number one on the chart in January with their debut single "Black Mamba". Their single "Savage" also ranked number one on the chart in October. The latter single spent three non-consecutive weeks at number one and achieved a triple crown. On the October 17 broadcast, it achieved 10,699 points, making it the single with the highest points of the year. Brave Girls won their first Inkigayo award for "Rollin'" over four years after its release after a YouTube video featuring performances of the song went viral, making it rise on South Korean music charts. The single spent three non-consecutive weeks at number one and achieved a triple crown. In July they had another number-one single with "Chi Mat Ba Ram".

Four boy groups achieved their first ever Inkigayo award in 2021. NCT's subunits NCT Dream and NCT 127 both ranked number one for the first time in May with "Hot Sauce" and "Sticker" in October, respectively. The former group went on to rank another single at number one with "Hello Future" in July. Other first-time number-one artists included Stray Kids with their single "Thunderous" from their second studio album. The last boy group to get their first Inkigayo trophy in 2021 was The Boyz with "Maverick". Three soloists also achieved their first ever number one on the chart in 2021: KyoungSeo with her debut single "Shiny Star (2020)", Rosé of Blackpink with her debut single "On the Ground", and Lee Mu-jin with his debut single "Traffic Light". In addition to Aespa, Brave Girls and NCT Dream, four other artists had more than one number one single on the chart in 2021. BTS had two chart toppers throughout the year; "Butter" and "Permission to Dance". Both singles also achieved a triple crown. Itzy also had two number-one singles achieved with "In the Morning" and "Loco". IU's "Celebrity", "Lilac" and "Strawberry Moon" achieved three number ones each helping the singles achieve triple crowns. All three singles spent a total of nine weeks at number one making IU the artist with the most number ones of the year. The only other act to achieve three number ones was Twice with "I Can't Stop Me", "Alcohol-Free" and "Scientist".

== Chart history ==
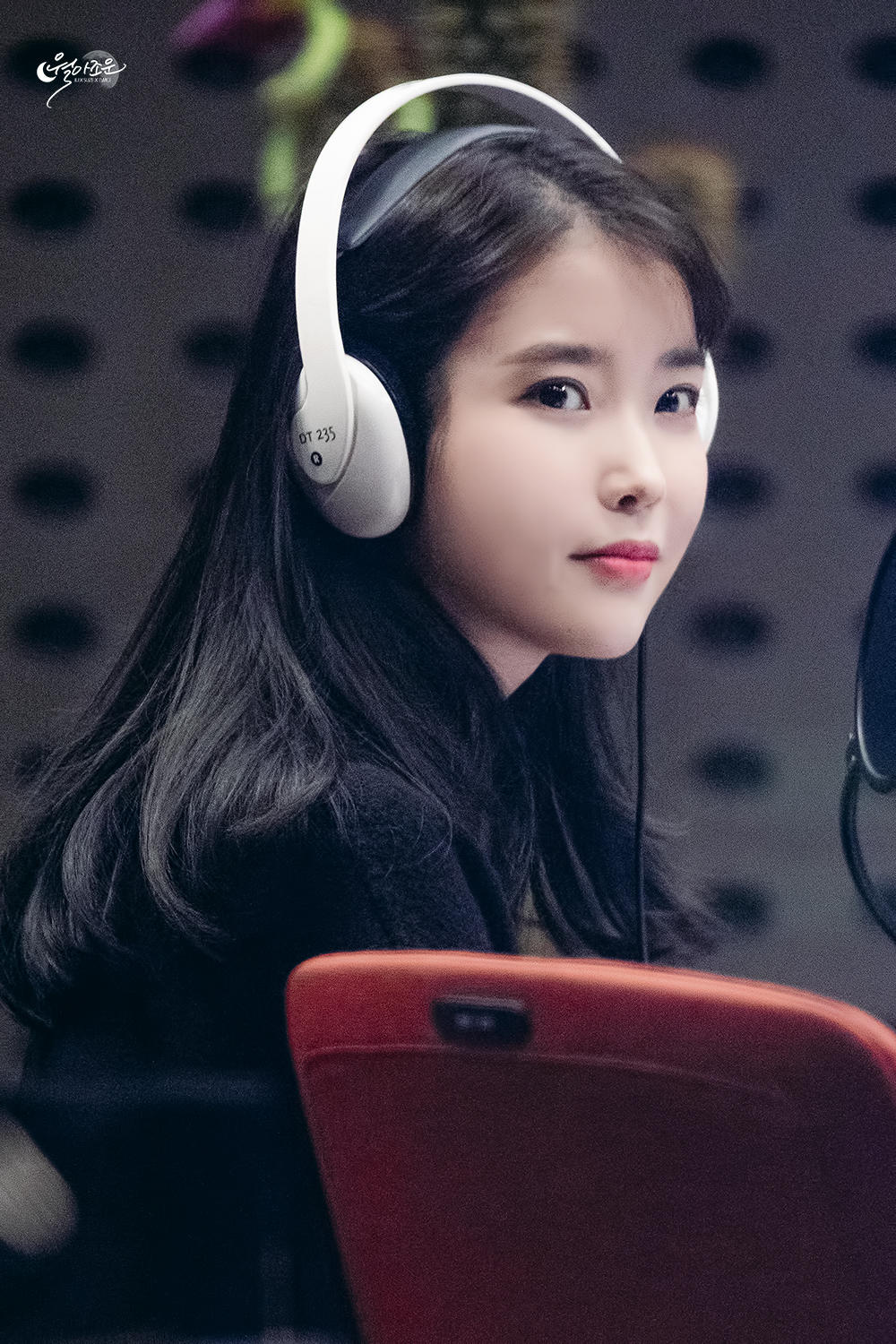
IU earned three Inkigayo Triple Crowns in 2021 for her singles "Celebrity", "Lilac", and "Strawberry Moon".

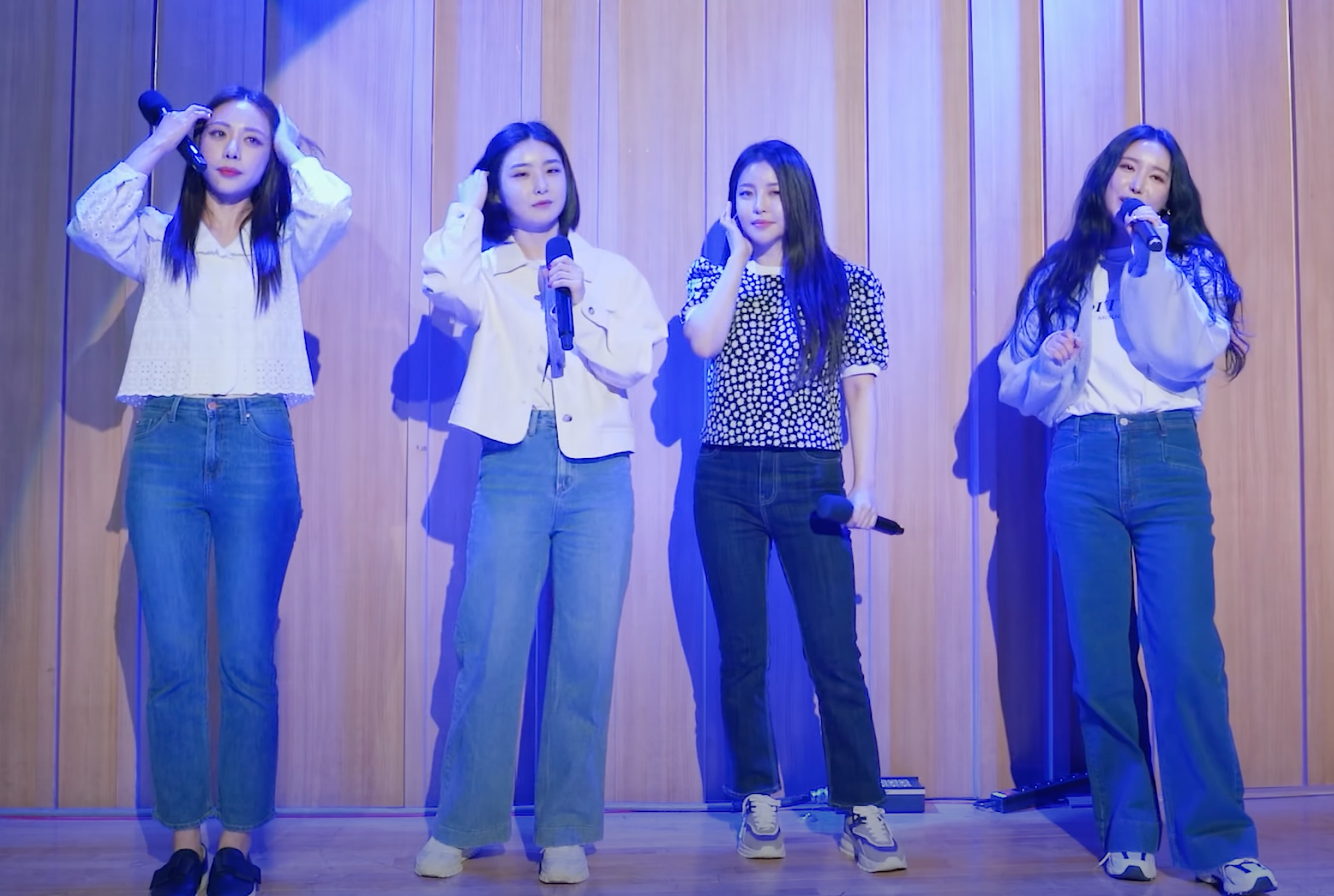
Brave Girls received their first music show win with their trophy for "Rollin'" on Inkigayo. The song also achieved a Triple Crown.

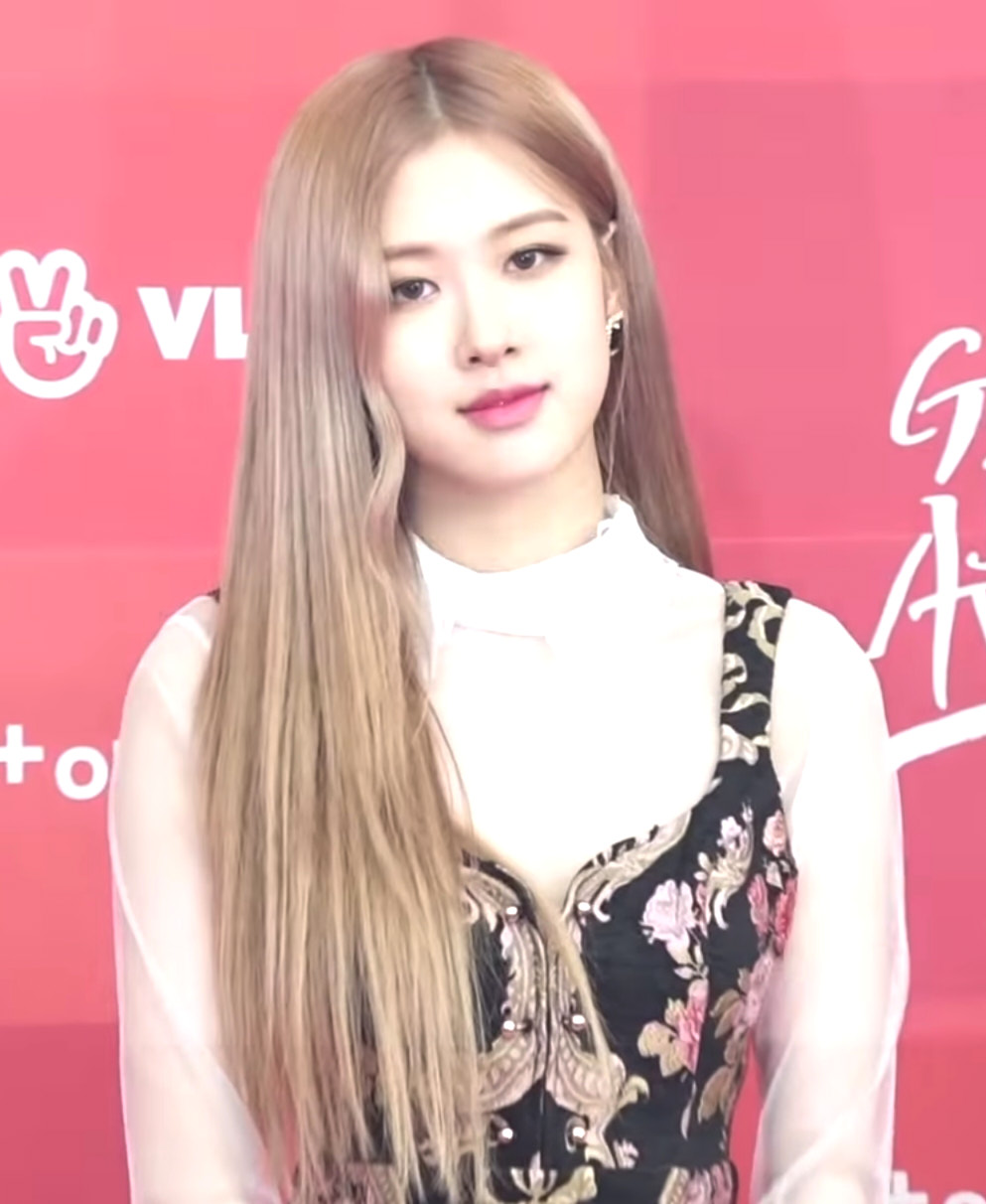
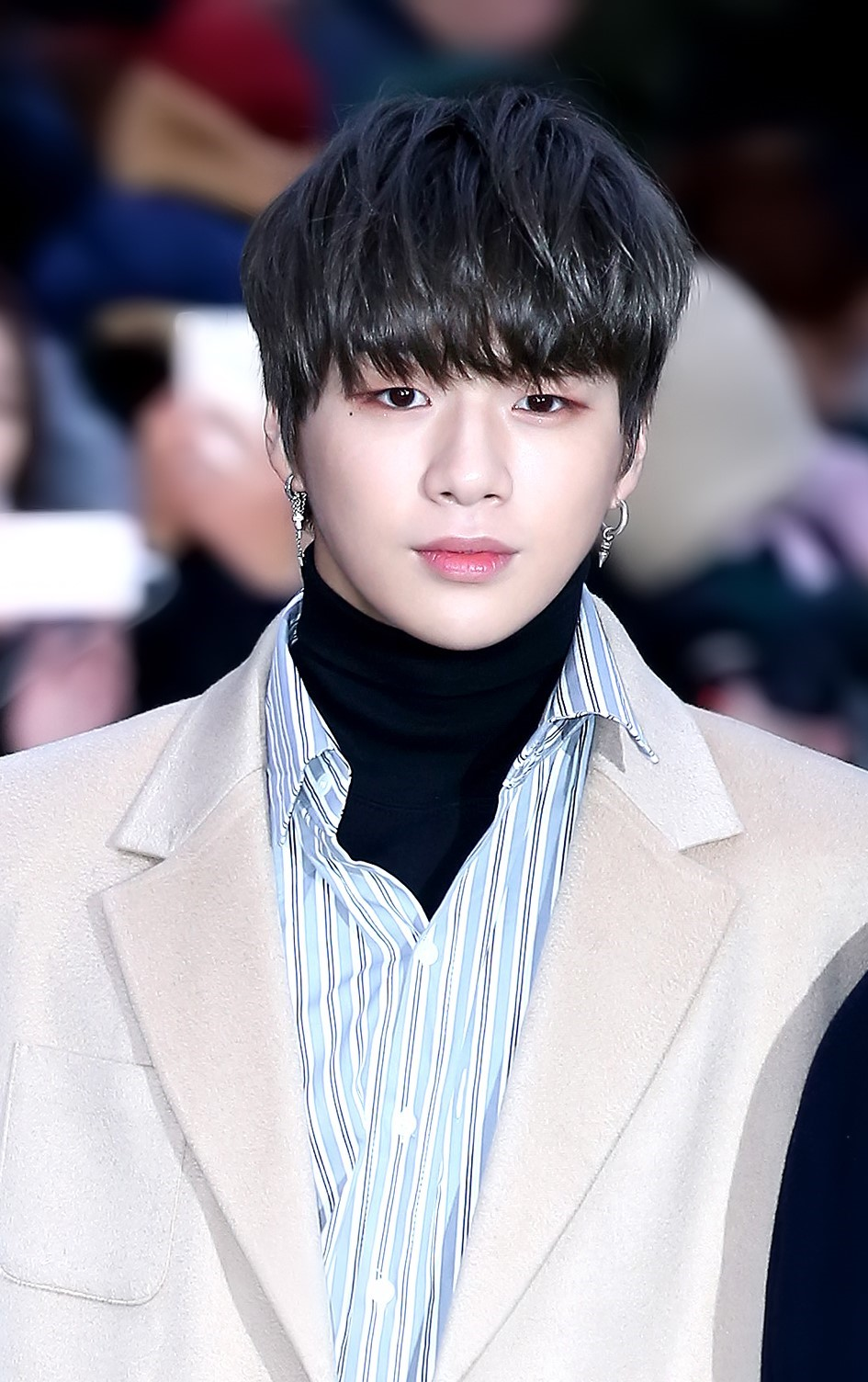
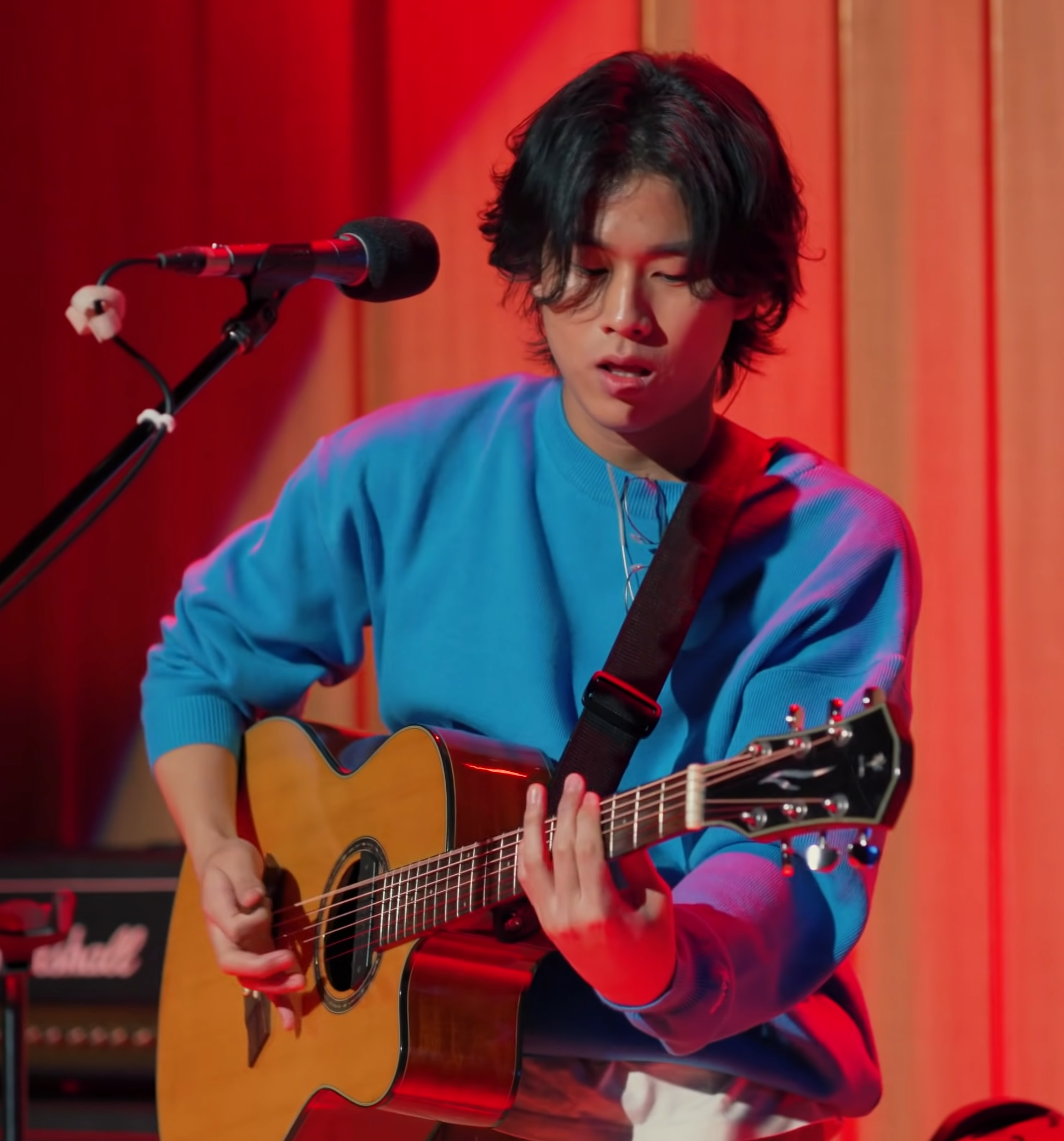
Soloists Rosé of Blackpink (left), Kang Daniel (middle), and Lee Mu-jin (right) received their first Inkigayo trophies for "On the Ground", "Antidote", and "Traffic Light" respectively.
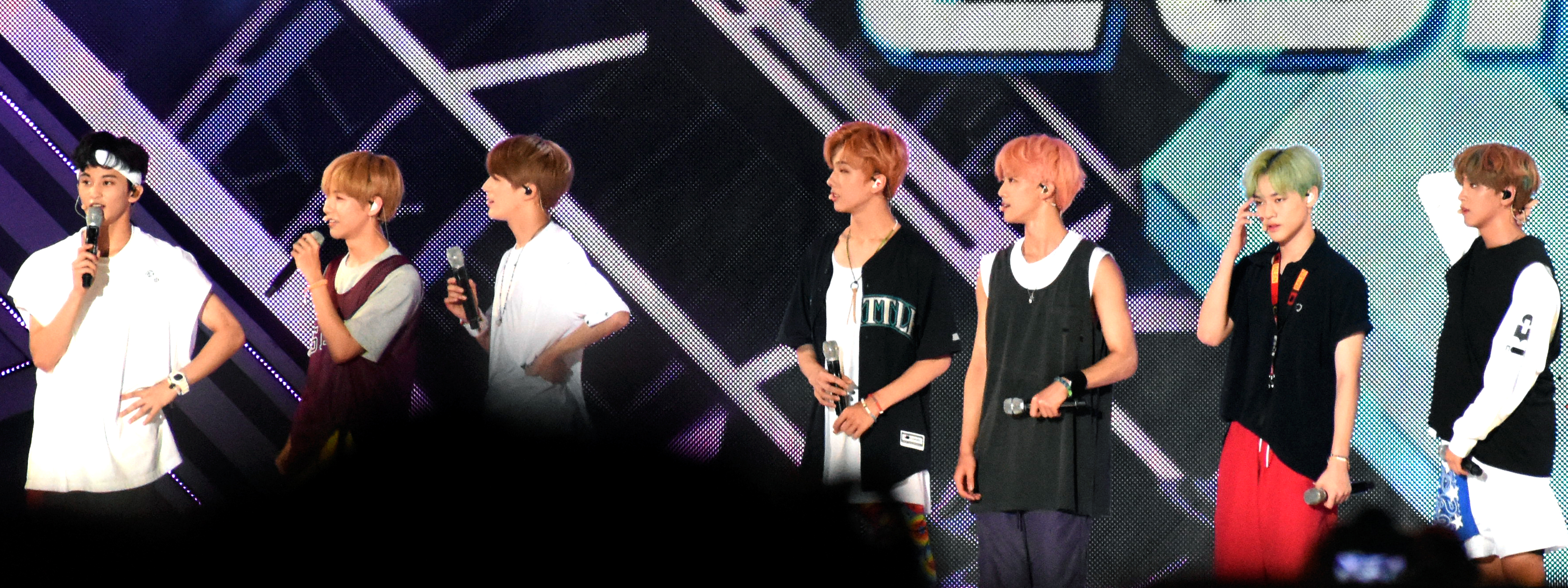
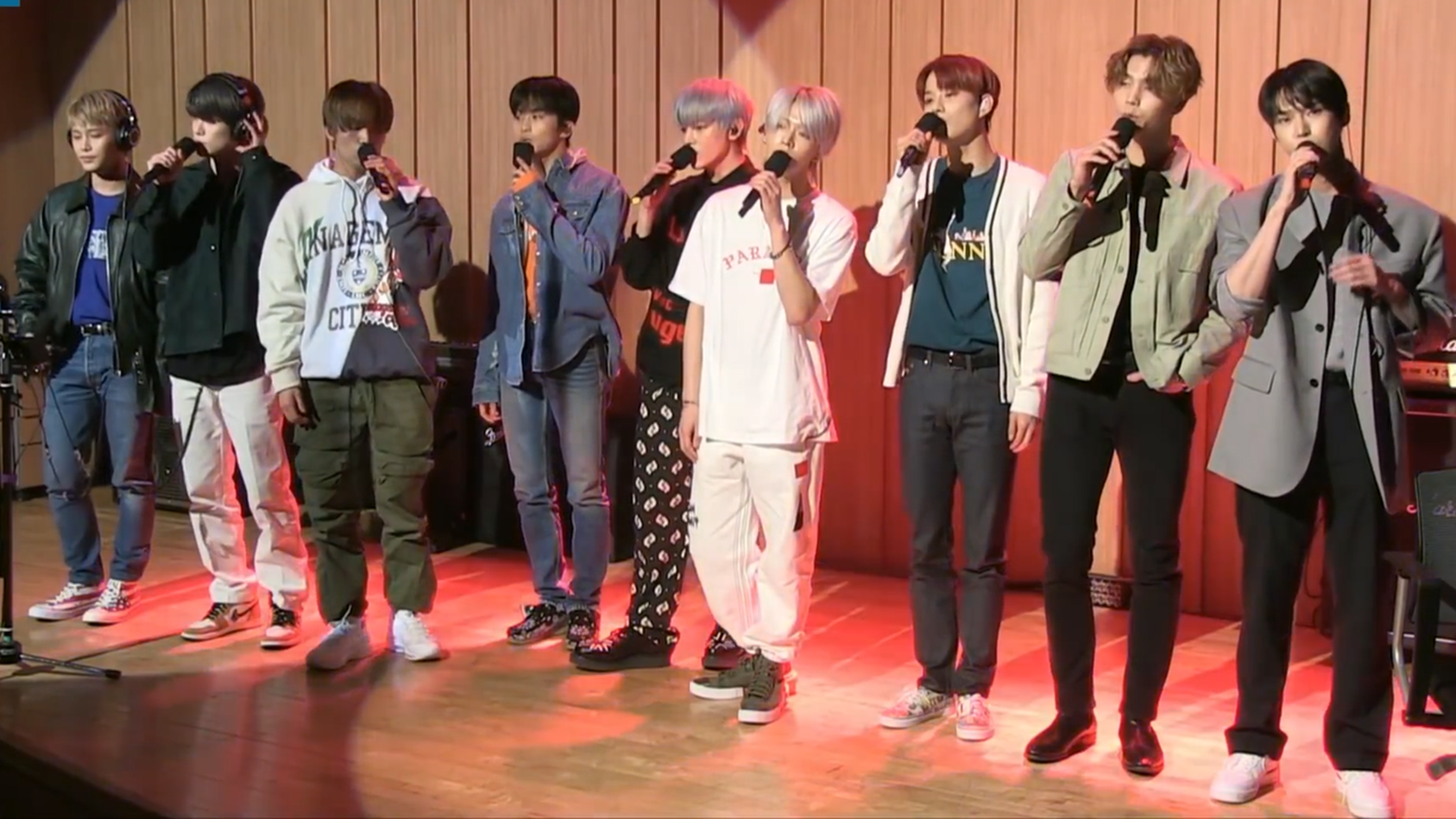
NCT Dream (top) received their first Inkigayo award with their win for "Hot Sauce", marking the first NCT group to win first place on the program. NCT 127 (bottom) won Inkigayo for the first time with "Sticker".

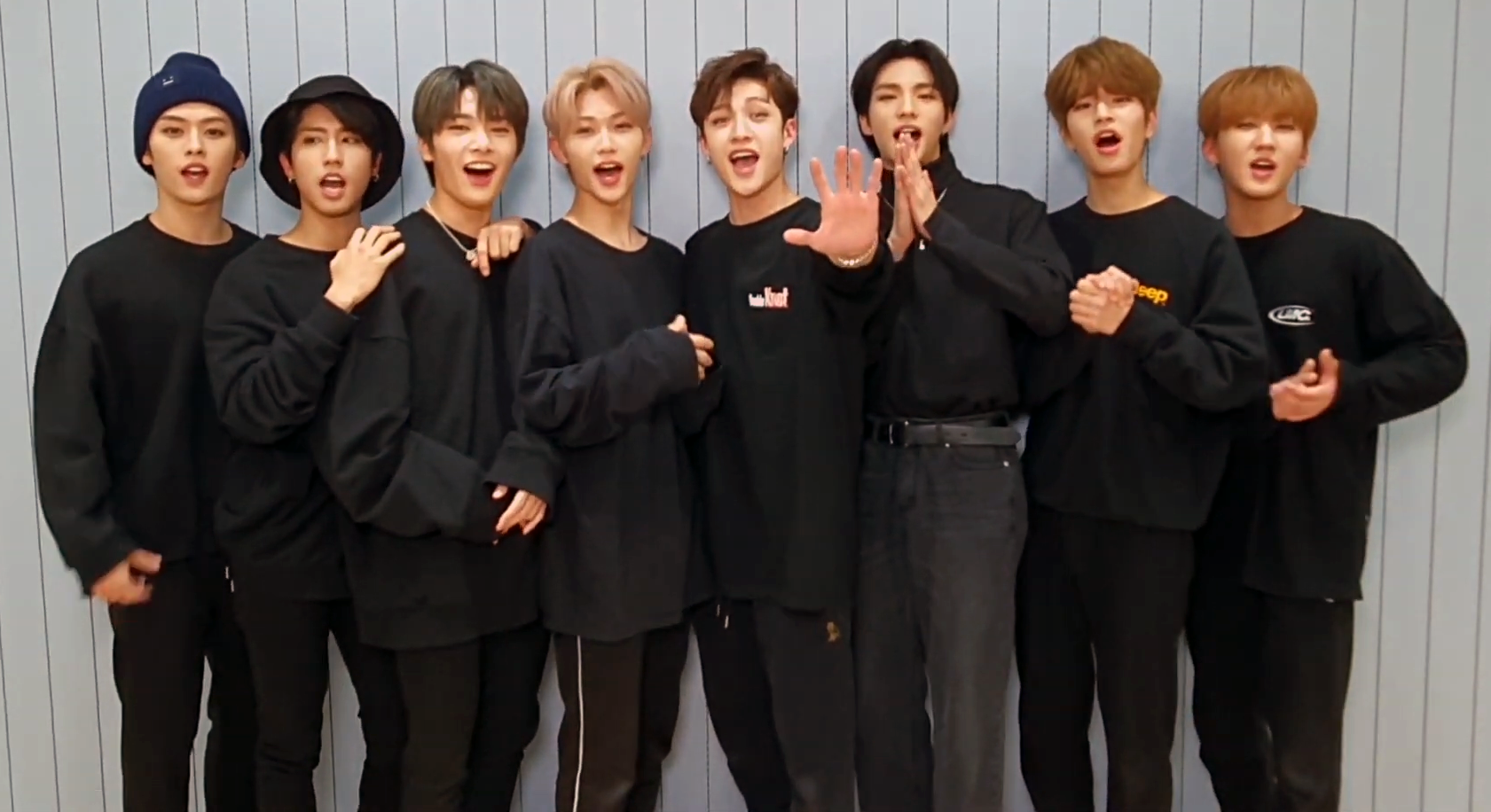
Stray Kids won their first Inkigayo trophy for "Thunderous".

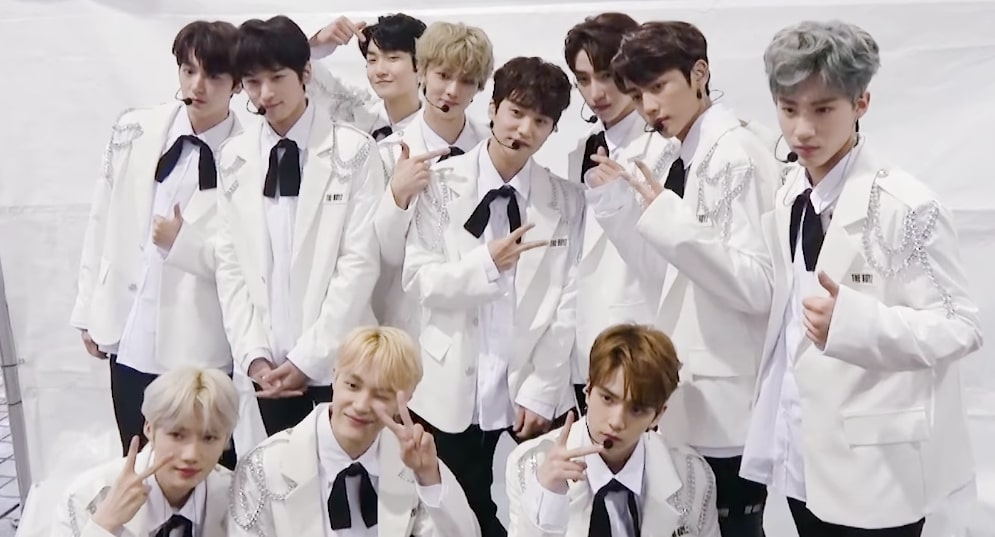
The Boyz received their first Inkigayo award for "Maverick".

Key
†	Indicates the song achieved a Triple Crown
‡	Indicates the highest score of the year
—	No show was held

Chart history
Episode	Date	Artist	Song	Points	Ref.
—	January 3	Twice	"I Can't Stop Me" † (Note: "I Can't Stop Me" ranked number one for two weeks in 2020.)	5,158	
1,076	January 10	KyoungSeo	"Shiny Star (2020)"	4,863	
1,077	January 17	Aespa	"Black Mamba"	4,097	
1,078	January 24	(G)I-dle	"Hwaa"	9,653	
1,079	January 31	(G)I-dle	"Hwaa"	6,412	
1,080	February 7	IU	"Celebrity" †	9,073	
—	February 14	No show, winner not announced			
1,081	February 21	IU	"Celebrity" †	8,101	
1,082	February 28	IU	"Celebrity" †	6,546	
1,083	March 7	Shinee	"Don't Call Me"	9,115	
1,084	March 14	Brave Girls	"Rollin'" †	6,270	
1,085	March 21	Brave Girls	"Rollin'" †	6,569	
1,086	March 28	Rosé	"On the Ground"	8,351	
1,087	April 4	IU	"Lilac" †	7,521	
1,088	April 11	IU	"Lilac" †	7,706	
1,089	April 18	IU	"Lilac" †	6,760	
1,090	April 25	Kang Daniel	"Antidote"	6,539	
1,091	May 2	NU'EST	"Inside Out"	6,047	
1,092	May 9	Brave Girls	"Rollin'" †	6,411	
1,093	May 16	Itzy	"In the Morning"	7,391	
1,094	May 23	NCT Dream	"Hot Sauce"	9,405	
1,095	May 30	BTS	"Butter" †	7,161	
1,096	June 6	BTS	"Butter" †	10,262	
1,097	June 13	BTS	"Butter" †	9,744	
1,098	June 20	Twice	"Alcohol-Free"	7,002	
1,099	June 27	Twice	"Alcohol-Free"	8,440	
1,100	July 4	Brave Girls	"Chi Mat Ba Ram"	8,001	
1,101	July 11	NCT Dream	"Hello Future"	7,323	
1,102	July 18	BTS	"Permission to Dance" †	6,933	
—	July 25	No show, winner not announced			
—	August 1	No show, winner not announced			
1,103	August 8	BTS	"Permission to Dance" †	8,651	
1,104	August 15	BTS	"Permission to Dance" †	7,090	
1,105	August 22	Lee Mu-jin	"Traffic Light" †	6,081	
1,106	August 29	Red Velvet	"Queendom"	8,378	
1,107	September 5	Stray Kids	"Thunderous"	6,116	
1,108	September 12	Red Velvet	"Queendom"	5,781	
1,109	September 19	Lee Mu-jin	"Traffic Light" †	5,636	
1,110	September 26	Lee Mu-jin	"Traffic Light" †	5,523	
1,111	October 3	NCT 127	"Sticker"	5,849	
1,112	October 10	Itzy	"Loco"	6,379	
1,113	October 17	Aespa	"Savage" †	10,699 ‡	
1,114	October 24	Aespa	"Savage" †	9,388	
1,115	October 31	IU	"Strawberry Moon" †	7,994	
—	November 7	No show, winner not announced			
1,116	November 14	The Boyz	"Maverick"	5,902	
1,117	November 21	IU	"Strawberry Moon" †	6,191	
1,118	November 28	Twice	"Scientist"	5,988	
1,119	December 5	Aespa	"Savage" †	6,330	
1,120	December 12	IU	"Strawberry Moon" †	5,533	
—	December 19	No show, winner not announced			
—	December 26	No show, winner not announced			
