= Good Girl (Candy Shop song) =

Single by Candy Shop

from the EP Hashtag#
- Language: Korean
- Released: March 27, 2024
- Genre: Baltimore club; dance
- Length: 2:39
- Label: Brave
- Composers: Brave Brothers; Red Cookie
- Lyricist: Brave Brothers

Music video
- "Good Girl" on YouTube

"Good Girl" is a song recorded by South Korean girl group Candy Shop for their debut extended play Hashtag#. It was released as the EP's lead single by Brave Entertainment on March 27, 2024.

== Background and release ==
On January 12, 2024, Brave Entertainment announced that it would be debuting a new girl group called Candy Shop, the first since Brave Girls in 2011. On March 11, Brave Entertainment confirmed that Candy Shop would debut with the extended play Hashtag# on March 27. Three days later, it was announced that the lead single would be titled "Good Girl". The first music teaser video was released on March 21, followed by the audio teaser a day later. On March 26, the second music teaser video was released. The song was released alongside its music video and the extended play on March 27.

== Composition ==
"Good Girl" was written and composed by Brave Brothers, with Red Cookie participating in the composition and arrangement. Described as a baltimore club dance song with lyrics telling "the lively story of the MZ generation". "Good Girl" was composed in the key of E minor, with a tempo of 150 beats per minute.

== Commercial performance ==
"Good Day" debuted at number 156 on South Korea's Circle Download Chart in the chart issue dated March 24–30, 2024.

== Promotion ==
Prior to the release of Hashtag#, on March 27, 2024, Candy Shop held a live showcase aimed at introducing the extended play and its songs, including "Good Girl". They subsequently performed on four music programs in the first week of promotion: Mnet's M Countdown on March 28, KBS's Music Bank on March 29, MBC's Show! Music Core on March 30, and SBS's Inkigayo on March 31. On the second week of promotion, they performed on three music programs: SBS M's The Show on April 2, MBC M's Show Champion on April 3, and Inkigayo on April 7. On the third week of promotion: they performed on three music programs: The Show on April 9, Music Bank on April 12, and Show! Music Core on April 13, On the fourth and final week of promotion, they performed on two music programs: The Show on April 16, and Inkigayo on April 21.

== Charts ==
Chart performance for "Good Girl"
Chart (2024)	Peak position
South Korea Downloads (Circle)	156

== Release history ==
Release history for "Good Day"
Region	Date	Format	Label
Various	March 27, 2024	Digital download; streaming	Brave
