= Chi Mat Ba Ram =

2021 single by Brave Girls

Single by Brave Girls

from the album Summer Queen
- Released: June 17, 2021
- Recorded: 2021
- Genre: Tropical house
- Length: 3:37
- Label: Brave
- Songwriters: Brave Brothers; Chakun

Brave Girls singles chronology
"We Ride" (2020)	"Chi Mat Ba Ram" (2021)	"Summer by Myself (Piano Version)" (2021)

Music video
- "Chi Mat Ba Ram" on YouTube

"Chi Mat Ba Ram" (Korean: 치맛바람; lit. 'Swish of a Skirt') is a song recorded by South Korean girl group Brave Girls for their fifth extended play Summer Queen (2021). It was released on June 17, 2021, by Brave Entertainment as the album's lead single. An English version of the song was also included in the extended play.

Upon release, the song peaked at number three on South Korea's Gaon Digital Chart and number two on the Billboard K-pop Hot 100, becoming the group's third top-five hit on both charts. The music video for the track was released on June 17, and shows the group having fun in a beach-side resort. To promote the song, Brave Girls performed "Chi Mat Ba Ram" on several South Korean music programs, including Music Bank, Show! Music Core and Inkigayo.

== Background and composition ==
In March 2021, Brave Girls rose to prominence with the sleeper hit "Rollin'", which became the group's first number one hit in South Korea. Three months later, the group announced the release of a new EP Summer Queen, their first album in four years. "Chi Mat Ba Ram" was revealed as the album's lead single. Written by Brave Brothers, the song is a tropical house and dance number with an upbeat sound. The song's title "Chi Mat Ba Ram" literally translates to "the swish of a skirt" in Korean and has been derived from the words "chima" and "baram". Although the term is often used negatively, the song is lyrically about the "fierceness in women". "Chi Mat Ba Ram" was released for digital download and streaming by Brave Entertainment on June 17, 2021, the same day as the album's release.

== Commercial performance ==
Upon release, the song debuted at number 14 on South Korea's Gaon Digital Chart for the chart issue dated June 19, 2021, with only two days of tracking. Additionally, it debuted on the component Download and Streaming charts at number 2 and number 28 respectively. The following week, it peaked at number three on the Digital, Download, and Streaming charts, becoming the group's third top-five hit after "Rollin'" (2017) and "We Ride" (2020).

"Chi Mat Ba Ram" peaked at number two on the Billboard K-pop Hot 100 on the issue dated July 3, 2021, becoming their third song to reach the top five and their highest-charting song since "Rollin'".

== Promotion ==
The music video of "Chi Mat Ba Ram" was released to YouTube on June 17 alongside the song. It was preceded by two teasers released on June 15 and 16. The video has a beach setting and shows the group enjoying themselves at a beach-side resort. The clip is interspersed with scenes in which the members are seen playing volleyball, enjoying drinks, going shopping, and performing choreography in front of the sunset. Within 10 days, the video surpassed 30 million views. To promote the song and the album, Brave Girls performed "Chi Mat Ba Ram" and the track "Pool Party" on several South Korean music programs, including KBS's Music Bank, MBC's Show! Music Core, and SBS' Inkigayo.

== Accolades ==
Award and nominations for "Chi Mat Ba Ram"
Year	Organization	Award	Result	Ref.
2021	Gaon Chart Music Awards	Song of the Year – June	Won	
2021	Golden Disc Awards	Best Digital Song (Bonsang)	Nominated	

Music program awards
Program	Network	Date	Ref.
The Show	SBS MTV	June 22, 2021	
Show! Music Core	MBC	July 3, 2021	
Inkigayo	SBS	July 4, 2021	

Melon Popularity Award
Award	Date	Ref.
Weekly Popularity Award	July 5	
Weekly Popularity Award	July 12	

== Charts ==
=== Weekly charts ===
Chart (2021)	Peak position
South Korea (Gaon)	3
South Korea (K-pop Hot 100)	2

=== Monthly charts ===
Monthly chart performance for "Chi Mat Ba Ram"
Chart (2021)	Peak position
South Korea (Gaon)	8

=== Year-end charts ===
Chart (2021)	Position
South Korea (Gaon)	62

== Release history ==
Release formats for "Chi Mat Ba Ram"
Region	Date	Format	Version	Label	Ref.
Various	June 17, 2021	Digital download, streaming	Original (Korean)	Brave	
Various	June 17, 2021	Digital download, streaming	English	Brave	

== See also ==
- List of The Show Chart winners (2021)
- List of Show! Music Core Chart winners (2021)
- List of Inkigayo Chart winners (2021)
