= High Heels (Brave Girls EP) =

EP by Brave Girls
- Released: June 27, 2016
- Recorded: 2016
- Genre: Dance-pop; R&B
- Length: 17:09
- Language: Korean
- Label: Brave Entertainment; CJ E&M
- Producer: Brave Brothers; Two Champ; Chakun; Maboos; JS

Brave Girls chronology
Re-Issue (2012)	High Heels (2016)	Rollin' (2017)

Singles from High Heels
- 1. "Deepened" Released: February 16, 2016; 2. "High Heels" Released: June 27, 2016

High Heels is the third extended play by South Korean girl group, Brave Girls. It was released on June 27, 2016 by Brave Entertainment and distributed by CJ E&M.

The EP was a moderate success, peaking at number 22 on the Gaon Album Chart.

== Background and release ==
On February 2, 2016, it was revealed that Brave Girls will be returned as 7-member group after two years hiatus. On February 16, "Deepened" was released as a digital single and marked their return to the music scene.

On June 19, 2016, Brave Entertainment announced that Brave Girls will be releasing a mini-album titled High Heels, revealing a comeback schedule, setting the release of the EP for June 27. A day later, it was revealed that the album will consists of five songs, including the song "Deepened", previously released, and also revealing the album cover. On June 21, were released the first two teaser images including members Yujeong and Eunji. On June 22, were released two more teaser images including members Hyeran and Yuna. On June 23, were released three teaser images including members Minyoung, Hayoon and Yoojin. From June 21 to June 26, a total of four music video teasers were released. On June 25, it was released a highlight medley of the EP and on June 26, the music video for the title track, "High Heels", was posted online.

The mini album was released on June 27 digitally in South Korea.

== Singles ==
"Deepened" was released as the first single from High Heels, it was released for digital purchase by Brave Entertainment under license of CJ E&M on February 16, 2016. A music video was released in conjunction with the release of the single. "Deepened" debuted and peaked at number 100 on MelOn and did not enter any major chart in South Korea, being the first single in their career to not achieve success.

"High Heels" is the main single and it was released on June 27, 2016, along with the mini album.

== Commercial performance ==
High Heels entered at number 22 on the Gaon Album Chart on the chart issue dated June 26 – July 2, 2016. The EP re-entered at number 92 on the chart issue dated July 17–23, 2016 and again at number 91 on the chart issue dated August 28 – September 3, 2016.

The album entered at number 87 on the Gaon Album Chart for the month of June with 626 copies sold.

== Track listing ==
No.	Title	Lyrics	Music	Arrangement	Length
1.	"High Heels" (하이힐; "haihil")	Brave Brothers, Chakun	Brave Brothers, JS, Chakun	JS, Brave Brothers	3:00
2.	"Help Me"	Chakun	Chakun, Two Champ	Two Champ	3:20
3.	"Whatever"	Maboos, Chakun	Maboos, JS	JS	3:32
4.	"Don't Meet" (만나지 말걸; "mannaji malgil")	Maboos	Maboos, JS, Miss Lee	JS	4:04
5.	"Deepened" (변했어; "byeonhaess-eo")	Brave Brothers, Maboos, JS	Brave Brothers, Maboos	JS	3:13
Total length:					17:09

== Charts ==
Chart (2016)	Peak position
South Korea Weekly (Gaon Album Chart)	22
South Korea Monthly (Gaon Album Chart)	87

== Release history ==
Region	Date	Format	Label
Worldwide	June 27, 2016	Digital download	Brave Entertainment
South Korea	June 27, 2016	CD, music download	Brave Entertainment
