= Thank You (Brave Girls EP) =

- Digital cover

EP by Brave Girls
- Released: March 14, 2022
- Length: 16:06
- Language: Korean
- Label: Brave; Kakao

Brave Girls chronology
Summer Queen (2021)	Thank You (2022)	One More Time (2023)

Singles from Thank You
- 1. "Thank You" Released: March 14, 2022

Professional ratings
Review scores
Source	Rating
IZM	3.5/5 stars

Thank You is the sixth extended play by South Korean girl group Brave Girls. It was released by Brave Entertainment on March 14, 2022, and contains five tracks, including the lead single of the same name. It is the last record released under the name "Brave Girls" and under Brave Entertainment.

== Background and release ==
On March 1, 2022, Brave Entertainment announced Brave Girls would be making their comeback on March 14. Two days later, it was announced that Brave Girls would be releasing their sixth extended play titled Thank You. The promotional schedule was also released in the same announcement. On March 4, the track listing was released with "Thank You" announced as the lead single. Five days later, the highlight medley teaser video was released. The music video teaser for "Thank You" was released on March 10 and 11. On February 16, 2023, Brave Entertainment announced Brave Girls would disband after the group chose not to renew their contracts with the company.

== Composition ==
The lead single "Thank You" was described as a retro dance pop and disco funk song that "contains exciting rhythm and addictive melodies." The second track "You and I" was described as a house-based dance pop song. The third track "Love Is Gone" was described as a song with lyrics that "stimulate listeners' emotions." The fourth track "Can I Love You" was described as a song with "retro synth and a groovy rhythm." The last track is a remix version of the lead single that "is more trendy by harmonizing acappella and classical sounds together."

== Promotion ==
On March 12, 2022, Brave Entertainment announced that the extended play's showcase event, originally scheduled for March 14, was postponed after Minyoung, Yujeong, and Eunji were diagnosed with COVID-19, the event was held on March 23 where the group introduce the extended play.

== Track listing ==
Track listing for Thank You
No.	Title	Lyrics	Music	Arrangement	Length
1.	"Thank You"	Brave Brothers; Maboos	Brave Brothers; Maboos; JS	JS	3:15
2.	"You and I" (Korean: 우리끼리; RR: Urikkiri)	Brave Brothers	Brave Brothers; Red Cookie	Red Cookie	3:07
3.	"Love Is Gone" (Korean: 물거품; RR: Mulgeopum)	Brave Brothers	Brave Brothers; JS; Chakun	JS	3:08
4.	"Can I Love You"	Brave Brothers	Brave Brothers; Red Cookie	Red Cookie	3:24
5.	"Thank You" (remix)	Brave Brothers; Maboos	Brave Brothers; Maboos; JS	JS	3:12
Total length:					16:06

== Charts ==
=== Weekly charts ===
Chart performance for Thank You
Chart (2022)	Peak position
South Korean Albums (Gaon)	11

=== Monthly charts ===
Monthly chart performance for Thank You
Chart (2022)	Peak position
South Korean Albums (Gaon)	27

== Release history ==
Release history for Thank You
Region	Date	Format	Label
South Korea	March 14, 2022	CD	Brave; Kakao
Various	March 14, 2022	Digital download; streaming	Brave; Kakao
