= Rollin' (Brave Girls EP) =

EP by Brave Girls
- Released: March 7, 2017
- Genre: EDM; Funk; R&B
- Length: 13:21
- Label: Brave Entertainment; CJ E&M
- Producer: Brave Brothers; Two Champ; Chakun; JS; Maboos

Brave Girls chronology
High Heels (2016)	Rollin' (2017)	Summer Queen (2021)

Singles from Rollin'
- 1. "Rollin'" Released: March 7, 2017

Alternative cover
- 2021 album cover

Music video
- "Rollin'" on YouTube

Rollin' is the fourth extended play recorded by South Korean girl group, Brave Girls. It was released on March 7, 2017 by Brave Entertainment and distributed by CJ E&M Music. This marked their first release as a five-member group, since original members Yoojin and Hyeran had stopped promotions with the group in early 2017. In order to promote the album, the group performed "Rollin'" on several South Korean music programs, including M Countdown and Inkigayo. A music video for the title track of the same name, was also released on March 7.

The EP was a moderate success peaking at number 30 on the Gaon Album Chart.

== Background and release ==
The group held a crowdfunding effort to subsidize their comeback on Makestar, from September to December 2016, with the scheduled of release the album in March 2017. On January 13, 2017, it was officially announced by Brave Entertainment, that member Yoojin would be leaving the group to focus on studies, meanwhile, member Hyeran would go on an indefinite hiatus due to health issues, but featured on the songs "Reminiscence" and "Don't Hurry" of the "Rollin'" album. It was also noted that there weren't any intentions to add new members and that the group would promote as a five-member group with members Minyoung, Eunji, Yuna, Yujeong and Hayun.

On February 8, it was officially announced that Brave Girls would be making a comeback in March and the new song would be produced by Brave Brothers, also stating that the recording process was finished and the music video was yet to be filmed. The comeback schedule was revealed on February 26. The first teaser images, of each member and as a group, were released on February 28, showing a more mature image for the group. The same day, KBS announced that the title track, "Rollin'", was unfit for broadcast, stating that certain parts of the lyrics contained inappropriate language. A representative from Brave Entertainment stated that they would revise the lyrics and plan to re-evaluate them. On March 2, the album cover and track list were revealed through their official Twitter account. On the same day, it was reported that the first music video teaser was given a 19+ rating for inappropriate attire.

The EP was released on March 7, 2017, through several music sites, including Melon in South Korea and iTunes, for the global market.

On March 8, it was reported that the previous ban for "Rollin'" on the public channel, KBS, branding the song unfit for broadcast was lifted. But the song "No Rush" was ruled unfit for broadcast once more.

On March 2, 2021, the album cover of "Rollin'" was changed to display a tropical concept as opposed to the original sexy concept, following multiple requests from fans.

== Music video ==
On March 3, 2017, at midnight KST, Brave Entertainment released the first music video teaser through the Brave Entertainment website and on the Brave Girls official YouTube channel. The teaser showed the girls in a dark room sitting on chairs with a storm as the background. It was rated 19+ in South Korea. On March 3, the second and final music video teaser was released, showing the group dance for the song and scenes with members sitting on a sofa.

The music video was released on March 7, in conjunction with the EP. The video shows the girls dancing in a room with a dark background, with the moon and thunder displayed on it. The dance is accompanied by chairs through key points of the dance. The video was restricted on YouTube for under eighteen viewers.

A day after, a dance version was released with no age restriction. On March 9, a clean version was released, cutting the parts from the original music video, where the girls where laying on each other on a black background.

== Promotion ==
The group held their first comeback stage on SBS's The Show on March 7, 2017, performing their title track. They continued on MBC Music's Show Champion on March 8, Mnet's M Countdown on March 9 and SBS's Inkigayo on March 12.

On March 5, 2021, Brave Entertainment confirmed that Brave Girls would return to promoting "Rollin'" on music shows after the song gained prominence recently. Apart from music shows, the group will also be guesting on variety and radio shows

== Commercial performance ==
Rollin' entered and peaked at number 30 on the Gaon Album Chart on the chart issue dated March 5–11, 2017. In its second week, the EP charted at number 100.

The EP entered at number 62 on the Gaon Album Chart for the month of March 2017, with 1,091 physical copies sold.

In February 2021, a video compilation of the 4 members performing "Rollin'" for South Korean military soldiers went viral on Korean media and YouTube, giving the song a boost four years after its initial release. "Rollin'" topped the MelOn, Bugs, FLO, and Genie real-time chart, achieving a "real-time all-kill". The song went on to enter Gaon Digital Chart at number 2, peaking two weeks later at number 1, beating out other well-known singers such as IU and making it their highest-charting song to date.

== Track listing ==
Digital download

No.	Title	Lyrics	Music	Arrangement	Length
1.	"Rollin'" (롤린; lollin)	Brave Brothers; Chakun	Brave Brothers; Two Champ; Chakun	Two Champ	3:17
2.	"Memory" (옛생각; yes-saeng-gag ^{[a]})	Brave Brothers; JS; Maboos	Brave Brothers; JS; Maboos	JS	3:11
3.	"Don't Rush" (서두르지 마; seoduleuji ma ^{[a]})	Maboos	JS; Maboos	JS	3:19
4.	"High Heels" (Remix) (하이힐; haihil)	Brave Brothers; Chakun	Brave Brothers; JS; Chakun	JS; Brave Brothers	2:25
5.	"Outro (Rollin')"	Brave Brothers; Chakun	Brave Brothers; Two Champ; Chakun	Two Champ	1:09
Total length:					13:21

Notes

- ^[a] – Member Hyeran participated singing the rap.

== Charts ==
=== Weekly charts ===
Chart (2017)	Peak position
South Korea (Gaon Album Chart)	30

=== Monthly charts ===
Chart (2017)	Peak position
South Korea (Gaon Album Chart)	62

== Release history ==
Region	Date	Format	Label
South Korea	March 7, 2017	CD, Digital download	Brave Entertainment, CJ E&M Music
Worldwide	March 7, 2017	Digital download	Brave Entertainment, CJ E&M Music
