= One More Time (single album) =

2023 single album by BB Girls

- Digital cover

Single album by BB Girls
- Released: August 3, 2023
- Genre: K-pop
- Length: 6:08
- Language: Korean
- Label: Warner Music Korea

BB Girls chronology
Thank You (2022)	One More Time (2023)	Brave Girls Best Album (2023)

Singles from One More Time
- 1. "One More Time" Released: August 3, 2023

One More Time is the second single album by South Korean girl group BB Girls. It was released digitally by Warner Music Korea on August 3, 2023, and physically on August 10, 2023. It contains two tracks including the lead single of the same name. The single album was their first and only record released under Warner Music Korea before their departure on April 22, 2024. It was their first release after their departure from Brave Entertainment, and the first under their rebranded name of BB Girls. It is also the last release to contain member Youjoung who left the group in April following the contract expiration.

== Background and release ==
On February 16, 2023, Brave Entertainment announced Brave Girls would disband after the group chose not to renew their contracts with the company. A day later, member Minyoung stated that "the group's disbandment would be temporary, and that they would eventually reunite in the future". On April 27, the group signed with Warner Music Korea with plans to release music in Summer 2023. It was also announced that "various possibilities" were being discussed regarding the continued use of the group's name. On May 3, it was announced the group would be rebranded as BB Girls. On July 19, it was announced BB Girls would be releasing their first music under Warner Music Korea on August 3. A day later, a promotional film was released. On July 24, it was announced they would be releasing their second album titled One More Time. The track listing was also released on the same day with "One More Time" announced as the lead single. On August 2, the music video teaser for "One More Time" was released. The single album was released alongside the music video for "One More Time" on August 3.

== Commercial performance ==
One More Time debuted at number 22 on South Korea's Circle Album Chart in the chart issue dated August 6–12, 2023.

== Track listing ==
Track listing for One More Time
No.	Title	Lyrics	Music	Arrangement	Length
1.	"One More Time"	Kim Min-ji (JamFactory); Elsa Curran; Blaise Railey; Rick James	Elsa Curran; Imad Royal; Blaise Railey; Ilan Rubin; Rick James	Imad Royal; Ilan Rubin	3:08
2.	"Lemonade"	Kim Mi-ri (JamFactory)	Ryan "Rykeyz" Williamson; Michelle Buzz; Noday	Ryan "Rykeyz" Williamson	3:00
Total length:					6:08

== Credits and personnel ==
Credits adapted from album's liner notes.

Studio

- Warner Music Korea Studio – recording (all tracks)
- Glab Studios – mixing, engineered for mix (track 1)
- Studio DDeep KICK – mixing (track 2)
- 821 Sound Studios – mastering (all tracks)

Personnel

- BB Girls – vocals (all tracks)
- Kim Min-ji (JamFactory) – lyrics (track 1)
- Elsa Curran – lyrics, composition (track 1)
- Blaise Railey – lyrics, composition (track 1)
- Rick James – lyrics, composition (track 1)
- Kim Mi-ri (JamFactory) – lyrics (track 2)
- Imad Royal – composition, arrangement (track 1)
- Ilan Rubin – composition, arrangement (track 1)
- Ryan "Rykeyz" Williamson – composition, arrangement (track 2)
- Michelle Buzz – composition (track 2)
- Noday – composition (track 2)
- Lee Kyung-won – recording (all tracks)
- Shin Bong-won – mixing (track 1)
- Yun Won-kwon – mixing (track 2)
- Park Nam-joon – engineered for mix (track 1)
- Kwon Nam-woo – mastering (all tracks)

== Charts ==
Chart performance for One More Time
Chart (2023)	Peak position
South Korean Albums (Circle)	22

== Release history ==
Release history for One More Time
Region	Date	Format	Label
South Korea	August 10, 2023	CD	Warner Music Korea
Various	August 3, 2023	Digital download; streaming	Warner Music Korea
