= Big Star (South Korean band) =

South Korean boy band

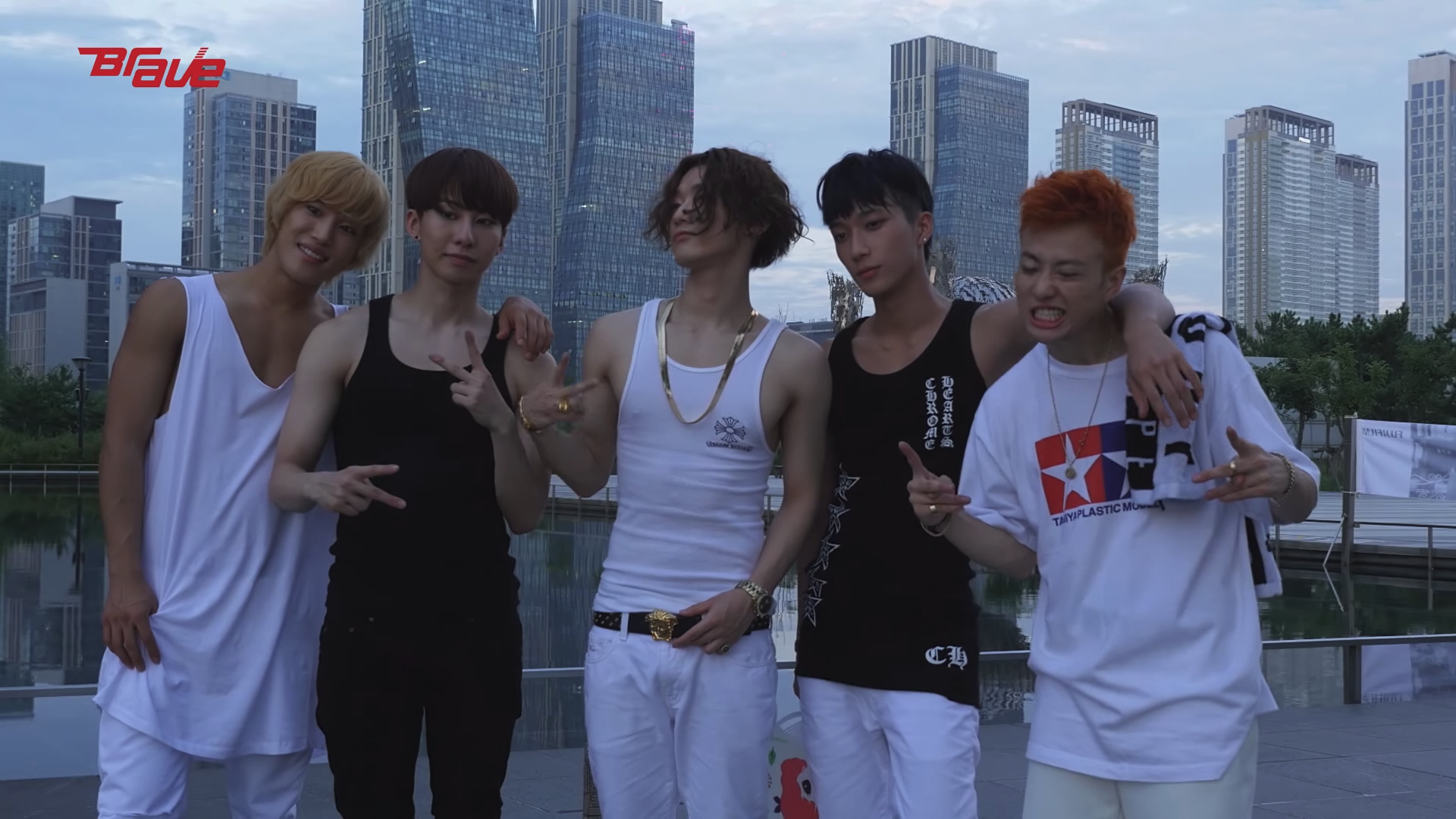
- Big Star in 2015

Background information
- Origin: Seoul, South Korea
- Genres: K-pop; dance-pop
- Years active: 2012–2019
- Label: Brave
- Past members: Baram; Raehwan; Feeldog; Sunghak; Jude

Big Star (Korean: 빅스타, often stylized as BIGSTAR) was a South Korean boy band formed in 2012. The group consisted of Feeldog, Baram, Raehwan, Sunghak and Jude. Big Star was signed to Brave Entertainment. On July 1, 2019, Brave Entertainment announced that Big Star have disbanded after the members contracts expired.

== History ==
Big Star released their first single, Bigstart, on July 12, 2012.

In 2014, Big Star became the first idol group to hold 100 concerts in Japan.

On June 27, 2017, Brave Entertainment confirmed that Sistar member Bora and Feeldog had been officially dating for about six months after meeting each other on Hit the Stage.

In October 2017, Big Star appeared in the KBS survival show, Idol Rebooting Project: The Unit. On February 10, 2018, Feeldog came in 4th place on The Unit, making him an official member and leader of the show's group, UNB.

In July 2019, the group disbanded following the expiration of members' contracts.

== Members ==
- Baram (바람)
- Raehwan (래환)
- Feeldog (필독)
- Sunghak (성학)
- Jude (주드)

== Discography ==
=== Extended plays ===
Title	Album details	Peak chart positions	Sales
Title	Album details	KOR	Sales
Blossom	Release: October 4, 2012; Label: Brave Entertainment; Format: CD, digital download; Track listing: 1. Shut Up; 2. Think (생각나); 3. Close Your Eyes (눈감아); 4. What Should I Do Tomorrow? (내일은뭐하지); 5. Someone New (새로운사람)	—	—N/a
Hang Out	Released: August 8, 2013; Label: Brave Entertainment; Format: CD, digital download; Track listing: 1. Be Brave (feat. ElectroBoyz); 2. Hooligan (날라리); 3. Run & Run (일단달려); 4. Shake It (흔들어); 5. The Same Girl (독 같은 여자)	14	KOR: 2,207+
Shine A Moon Light	Released: September 4, 2015; Label: Brave Entertainment; Format: CD, digital download; Track listing: 1. Moonlight Sonata (달빛소나타); 2. Birthday; 3. Would You or Would You Not (줄래 안줄래); 4. Come On (왜이래); 5. Outro	8	KOR: 1,457+
"—" denotes release did not chart.

=== Single albums ===
Title	Album details	Peak chart positions	Sales
Title	Album details	KOR	Sales
Bigstart	Released: July 12, 2012; Label: Brave Entertainment; Formats: CD, digital download; Track list: 1. Big Star; 2. Hot Boy; 3. Baby Girl	—	—N/a

=== Singles ===
==== As lead artist ====
Title	Year	Peak chart positions	Sales	Album
Title	Year	KOR	Sales	Album
"Hot Boy"	2012	73	—N/a	Bigstart
"Thinking Of You" (생각나)	2012	96	—N/a	Blossom
"I Got The Feeling" (느낌이 와)	2012	96	—N/a	Non-album single
"Run & Run" (일단달려)	2013	—	—N/a	Hang Out
"Standing Alone" (홀로서기)	2013	—	—N/a	Non-album singles
"Forget U" (너를 지워본다)	2014	—	—N/a	Non-album singles
"Full Moon Shine" (달빛소나타)	2015	99	KOR: 19,904+	Shine A Moon Light
"—" denotes single did not chart.

==== As featured artist ====
Title	Year	Peak chart positions		Sales (DL)	Album
Title	Year	KOR	KOR Hot	Sales (DL)	Album
"Passing of the Year" (올해가 가고) (Electroboyz, Brave Girls, Big Star & Park Soo Jin)	2013	105	90	KOR: 18,239	Passing of the Year (Prod. Brave Brothers)
"—" denotes releases that did not chart or were not released in that region.

==== Compilation appearances ====
Title	Year	Peak chart positions	Album
Title	Year	KOR	Album
"Lonely Geese" (외기러기)	2013	—	Immortal Songs: Singing the Legend (The Onions)
"—" denotes releases that did not chart or were not released in that region.
