= Deepened =

Single by Brave Girls

from the album High Heels
- Released: February 16, 2016
- Length: 3:13
- Label: Brave Entertainment; CJ E&M
- Songwriters: Brave Brothers; Maboos; JS
- Producers: Brave Brothers; Maboos

Brave Girls singles chronology
"For You" (2013)	"Deepened" (2016)	"High Heels" (2016)

"Deepened" (Korean: 변했어; RR: Byeonhaess-eo) is a song recorded by South Korean girl group Brave Girls. It was released on February 16, 2016 as a digital single and later included in the third EP from the group, High Heels (2016). The song was released by Brave Entertainment and distributed by CJ E&M. Written by Brave Brothers, Maboos and JS, and produced by the first two. It marks their first release in two and a half years from the group and also with the addition of five new member.

== Background and release ==
On February 3, 2016, Brave Entertainment announced that three of the five originals members left the group, and five new members were added, being Minyeong, Yujeong, Eunji, Yuna and Hayun, the new members and Yoojin and Hyeran, the last two original members, transforming Brave Girls into a group of 7 members. It was also revealed that the group was preparing a new song with a release date within the month.

On February 11, 2016, it was revealed that the group was releasing their first song since 2013 on February 16 at noon KST, called "Deepened", produced by Brave Brothers in collaboration with Maboos and JS. The song was described as retro-dance pop music. It was also revealed that the group will be holding a showcase the same day.

On February 16, 2016, the song was officially released through digital portals in South Korea, such as MelOn, and on iTunes for the global market. The music video was also release the same day and had more than 900,000 views on the CJ E&M YouTube channel and more than 400,000 views on their official YouTube channel, with a total of 1,300,000 views by the end of June.

== Reception ==
The song made Billboard's 20 Best K-Pop Songs of 2016 list at number 18, stating that "from the smoky opening, the ladies made heartbroken melancholy sound sexier than ever".

== Track listing ==
Digital single
No.	Title	Lyrics	Music	Arrangement	Length
1.	"Deepened" (변했어; "byeonhaess-eo")	Brave Brothers, Maboos, JS	Brave Brothers, Maboos	JS	3:13
Total length:					3:13
