= Park Soo-jin (singer, born 1995) =

South Korean singer

- Born: December 4, 1995 (age 29); South Korea
- Genres: K-pop
- Occupations: Singer; actress
- Instrument: Vocals
- Years active: 2013–present
- Labels: Brave Entertainment
- Website: bravesound.com

Korean name
- Hangul: 박수진
- RR: Bak Sujin
- MR: Pak Sujin

Park Soo-jin (Korean: 박수진; born December 4, 1995) is a South Korean singer. She joined Brave Entertainment in 2014 while she was a semi-finalist on the MBC audition program The Great Birth Season 3. She also appeared on Immortal Song: Singing the Legend in 2014 and 2015.

== Music career ==
=== 2014–present: Solo debut ===
Park Soo-jin officially debuted on March 14, 2014 with her first single "My Story". On December 11, 2014 she came back with her second single "Fallin" with a music video released the same day.

== Discography ==
=== Extended plays ===
Title	EP details
Foolish	Released: June 30, 2021; Label: Independent; Format: Digital download
28 Dream	Released: July 17, 2022; Label: Independent; Format: Digital download

=== Singles ===
Title	Year	Peak chart positions	Album
Title	Year	KOR	Album
"Feeling Nervous" (떨려요) (with Electroboyz)	2013	105	Non-album singles
"Passing of the Year" (올해가 가고) (with Electroboyz, Brave Girls & Big Star)	2013	105	Non-album singles
"My Story" (내 얘기야)	2014	65	Non-album singles
"Fallin" (빈자리)	2014	—	Non-album singles
"You Say"	2021	—	Non-album singles
"Bye Bye Bye" (헤어진 날까지)	2021	—	Non-album singles
"Foolish"	2021	—	Foolish
"Think"	2021	—	Non-album singles
"Distortion"	2021	—	Non-album singles
"Love?"	2021	—	Non-album singles
"28 Dream"	2022	—	28 Dream

=== Soundtrack appearances ===
Title	Year	Album
"I'm Fine" (난 괜찮아)	2015	Jumping Girl OST

=== Compilation appearances ===
Title	Year	Album
"Halo"	2013	Star Audition 3 TOP 4 Live Contest
"Distant Memories of You" (기억속의 먼 그대에게)	2013	Star Audition 3 TOP 3 Live Contest
"Empire State Of Mind"	2013	Star Audition 3 Grand Final TOP 2
"Wait for Me" (기다려 줘)	2014	Immortal Songs: Singing the Legend (Kim Kwang-seok)
"Said" (라구요)	2014	Immortal Songs: Singing the Legend (New Year's Eve Part 1)
"When Lilac Wilts" (라일락이 질 때)	2014	Immortal Songs: Singing the Legend (Lee Seon-hee Part 1)
"White Magnolias" (하얀 목련) (feat. Feeldog of Big Star)	2014	Immortal Songs: Singing the Legend (Yang Hee-eun)
"Young Love" (애송이의 사랑)	2014	Music Trip Yesterday Episode 9
"A Drink of Memories" (한 잔의 추억)	2015	Immortal Songs: Singing the Legend (Lee Jang-hee Part 2)
