= We Ride (Brave Girls song) =

2020 single by Brave Girls

Single by Brave Girls
- Released: August 14, 2020
- Genre: City pop
- Length: 3:09
- Label: Brave; Kakao M
- Composers: Brave Brothers; Maboos; JS; 2CHAMP
- Lyricists: Brave Brothers; Maboos

Brave Girls singles chronology
| "Rollin'" (2018) | "We Ride" (2020) | "Chi Mat Ba Ram" (2021) |

Music video
- "We Ride" on YouTube

"We Ride" (Korean: 운전만해; RR: Unjeonmanhae) is a song recorded by South Korean girl group Brave Girls. It was digitally released on August 14, 2020, by Brave Entertainment and distributed by Kakao M.

A sleeper hit, the song initially failed to chart in South Korea following its release. Seven months later in March 2021, following the sudden success of "Rollin'", "We Ride" also became a success and their second top 5 hit on both the Gaon Digital Chart and the K-pop Hot 100.

== Composition ==
The song was written by Brave Brothers and Maboos, who also composed the song alongside JS and 2CHAMP. The song was described as a retro mood city-pop genre dance song that empathizes with the silence between old lovers who faced boredom, within the lyrics.

== Background and release ==
On August 5, 2020, it was announced that the group will comeback on August 14, releasing a poster using an analog TV style with the group's name and the release date. This will be the group's first release in almost three years. A day later, Brave Entertainment revealed the title as "We Ride", releasing the cover image. It was also noted that it will be a digital single. The image shows the group's 180 degrees change in image, showing a new image for the group which boasted brilliant visuals in a retro mood.

On August 7, individual concept photo teasers were released, starting with Eunji, followed by Yujeong on August 8, Yuna on August 9 and Minyoung on August 10. On August 11, a group concept teaser was released.

"We Ride" was released on August 14, 2020, through several music portals, including MelOn and Apple Music.

== Music video ==
A music video teaser was released on August 12. In the 30-second teaser, the members started as if they were riding in a car together with an indifferent expression in the city covered with colorful lights of retro sensibility. The music video shows the girls filming commercials and winning first place at a music show, some of their dreams that never came true at that moment.

== Commercial performance ==
At the time of its release, the song failed to enter the Gaon Digital Chart. Almost seven months after its release, the song debuted at number 133 on the component Download Chart. It debuted at number 115 on the Gaon Digital Chart for the week ending March 13, 2021, placing at the number 18 on the component Download Chart as a "hot" release and at number 141 on the component Streaming Chart. In its second week, the song rose to number 44 and again in its third week to number 24. The song continued to rise in the chart, entering the Top 10 at number 10 in its fifth week. The song stayed in the Top 10 for four more weeks, rising each week, peaking at number 7 on the component Download Chart and at number 4 on the component Streaming Chart in its eighth week. It achieved a new peak at number 4 in its ninth week, as the fourth most-streamed song of the week.

The song also charted at number 55 for the month of March 2021, as the 23rd best-selling song and as the 70th most-streamed song of the month. It rose to number 5 for the month of April 2021, as the 8th best-selling song and as the 5th most-streamed song of the month. It peaked at number 4 for the month of May 2021, as the 18th best-selling song and as the 4th most-streamed song of the month. It charted at number 10 for the month of June 2021 and at number 22 for the month of July.

The song placed at number 12 for 2021 mid-year chart.

== Accolades ==
Melon Popularity Award
| Award | Date (2021) | Ref. |
|---|---|---|
| Weekly Popularity Award | April 19 | |
| Weekly Popularity Award | April 26 | |
| Weekly Popularity Award | May 3 | |
| Weekly Popularity Award | May 10 | |
| Weekly Popularity Award | May 17 | |

== Charts ==
=== Weekly charts ===
| Chart (2021) | Peak position |
|---|---|
| South Korea (Gaon) | 4 |
| South Korea (K-pop Hot 100) | 4 |

=== Monthly charts ===
| Chart (2021) | Peak Position |
|---|---|
| South Korea (Gaon) | 4 |
| South Korea (K-pop Hot 100) | 4 |

=== Year-end charts ===
| Chart (2021) | Position |
|---|---|
| South Korea (Gaon) | 16 |
