= Rollin' (Brave Girls song) =

2017 single by Brave Girls

- New version cover art

Single by Brave Girls

from the EP Rollin'
- Released: March 7, 2017; August 11, 2018 (New version)
- Genre: Dance-pop; tropical house
- Length: 3:18
- Label: Brave
- Songwriters: Brave Brothers; Two Champ; Chakun
- Producer: Two Champ

Brave Girls singles chronology
| "Yoo-hoo" (2016) | "Rollin'" (2017) | "We Ride" (2020) |

Music video
- "Rollin'" on YouTube

"Rollin'" (Korean: 롤린) is a song by South Korean girl group Brave Girls. It was released on March 7, 2017, as the lead single from the EP of the same name. Written by Brave Brothers, Two Champ, and Chakun, the song has been characterized as a dance-pop track that incorporates elements of tropical house. A rearranged version of the song titled "Rollin' (New Version)" was released on August 11, 2018, as a thank-you to the group's fans for their support of the original version.

A sleeper hit, "Rollin'" initially failed to chart in South Korea following its release. Four years later, the song experienced a sudden surge in popularity when a compilation video of Brave Girls performing it for the South Korean military went viral in the country in February 2021. It soon became a nationwide hit, and achieved number one on both the Gaon Digital Chart and the K-pop Hot 100, where it remained for five and six non-consecutive weeks respectively.

== Release and promotion ==
"Rollin'" was originally released on March 7, 2017, as the title track and lead single from Brave Girls' fourth extended play Rollin'. The group began promotional activities for the song later that day with their first domestic television music show performance on SBS MTV's The Show, followed by appearances on MBC Music's Show Champion on March 8, Mnet's M Countdown on March 9, SBS's Inkigayo on March 12, and KBS2's Music Bank on March 24. On August 11, 2018, the group released "Rollin' (New Version)", a rearranged version of the song, as a gift to fans for their passionate support of the song over the course of the previous year and a half.

In March 2021, in response to the song's surge in popularity after going viral, Brave Girls resumed promotions for the song.

== Music video ==
On March 3, 2017, the first teaser for the music video for "Rollin'" was released through Brave Entertainment's website and on Brave Girls' official YouTube channel. The teaser shows the girls in a dark room sitting in chairs with a storm as a background. It was rated 19+ in South Korea. On March 3, the second and final teaser was released, showing the group dance for the song and scenes with members sitting on a sofa.

The music video was released on March 7, 2017, in conjunction with the EP. The video shows the girls dancing in a room with a dark background, showing the Moon and thunder. Chairs were incorporated into key parts of the song's choreography. The video was restricted on YouTube for viewers under eighteen. The following day, a choreography-only version was released; it was not age-restricted. On March 9, Brave Entertainment released a clean version of the original music video, in which scenes of the girls lying on each other had been removed.

== Reception ==
Prior to the song's release, KBS deemed "Rollin'" unfit for broadcast, stating that certain parts of the lyrics contained a slang word which was too vulgar. Brave Entertainment responded that they would revise the lyrics and resubmit the song for reevaluation. On March 8, 2017, news media reported that the modified version had been reviewed and accepted by KBS.

In late February 2021, four years after the song was released, a compilation video of Brave Girls performing the song became viral on YouTube. The song subsequently received a surge in popularity and rose to the top of real-time music charts. It soon achieved a "perfect all-kill", simultaneously topping all real-time charts in South Korea, and became the first song by a group to do so in 2021. On March 22, 2021, "Rollin'" topped the charts for 198 hours, making Brave Girls the girl group with the most "perfect all-kills", a record formerly held by girl group Twice who had a total of 197 PAKs.

On June 12, 2024, Carmen Chin included "Rollin'" in NME's list of the 15 best K-pop summer songs of all time, praising the track's "straightforward, upbeat vibe".

== Commercial performance ==
At the time of its original release in 2017, "Rollin'" failed to enter South Korea's Gaon Digital Chart. Subsequent to its going viral earlier in the month of February 2021, the song entered the component Download Chart at number 60 for the week ending February 27, and peaked at number four the following week, for the period ending March 6. The song debuted on the Digital Chart for that same week at number two. It peaked atop said chart in its third week, for the period ending March 20, giving Brave Girls their first number-one in the country. The song spent a second consecutive week at the top, for the period ending March 27, before being replaced by IU's "Lilac" the week ending April 3. Collectively, it spent five non-consecutive weeks in first place, becoming the first song by a girl group in Gaon history to achieve this. "Rollin'" also entered the component Streaming Chart for the period ending March 6, at number three. It peaked at number one the following week, where it remained for three consecutive weeks until "Lilac" claimed the lead there as well. The song spent seven non-consecutive weeks at number one on the streaming ranking. It topped the monthly Digital and Streaming charts for March and May. When Gaon published its mid-year charts in July, "Rollin'" ranked second on both the Digital and Streaming charts, and sixth on the Download Chart.

In South Korea, "Rollin'" was the second most successful song of 2021, second most-streamed song of 2021, and the eighth best-selling song of 2021.

"Rollin'" entered the Billboard K-pop Hot 100 at number 23 on the issue dated March 13, 2021, marking Brave Girls' first entry on the chart. The song rose to number two in its second week, and peaked at number one in its third, on the chart issue dated March 27, becoming the first number-one of the group's career and making Brave Girls only the third k-pop girl group in history—behind Oh My Girl and Blackpink—to top the ranking. It is the second South Korean catalog song (Note: Billboard defines a catalog song as one that is more than 18 months old.) to lead the chart, and holds the record for the longest climb—four years—to number one. (Note: "Downtown Baby" by Rapper Bloo originally held the record for longest climb to number one. The song achieved number one on June 20, 2020, two and a half years after it was released.) Rollin'" spent six non-consecutive weeks at number one on the chart.

"Rollin' (New Version)" debuted at number 130 on the Gaon Download Chart for the week ending March 6, 2021, and peaked at number 50 on the issue for the week ending March 20. The song also entered the Digital Chart for that same week at number 163, its peak. It peaked at number 199 on the Streaming Chart for the week ending March 27.

== Accolades ==
Music program awards for "Rollin'"
| Program | Date | Ref. |
|---|---|---|
| Inkigayo | March 14, 2021 | |
| Inkigayo | March 21, 2021 | |
| Inkigayo | May 9, 2021 | |
| The Show | March 16, 2021 | |
| Show Champion | March 17, 2021 | |
| M Countdown | March 18, 2021 | |
| Music Bank | March 19, 2021 | |

Melon Popularity Award
| Award | Date (2021) | Ref. |
|---|---|---|
| Weekly Popularity Award | March 15 | |
| Weekly Popularity Award | March 22 | |
| Weekly Popularity Award | March 29 | |
| Weekly Popularity Award | April 5 | |
| Weekly Popularity Award | April 12 | |

== Charts ==
=== Weekly charts ===
Weekly chart performance for "Rollin'"
| Chart (2021) | Peak position |
|---|---|
| Global Excl. U.S. (Billboard) | 189 |
| South Korea (Gaon) | 1 |
| South Korea (K-pop Hot 100) | 1 |
| US World Digital Songs (Billboard) | 13 |

=== Monthly charts ===
Monthly chart performance for "Rollin'"
| Chart (2021) | Peak Position |
|---|---|
| South Korea (Gaon) | 1 |
| South Korea (K-pop Hot 100) | 1 |

=== Year-end charts ===
Year-end chart performance for "Rollin'"
| Chart (2021) | Position |
|---|---|
| South Korea (Gaon) | 2 |
| Chart (2022) | Position |
| South Korea (Circle) | 86 |

== See also ==
- List of Gaon Digital Chart number ones of 2021
- List of K-pop Hot 100 number ones
- List of Inkigayo Chart winners (2021)
- List of M Countdown Chart winners (2021)
- List of Music Bank Chart winners (2021)
- List of Show Champion Chart winners (2021)
- List of The Show Chart winners (2021)
