= BB Girls =

South Korean girl group

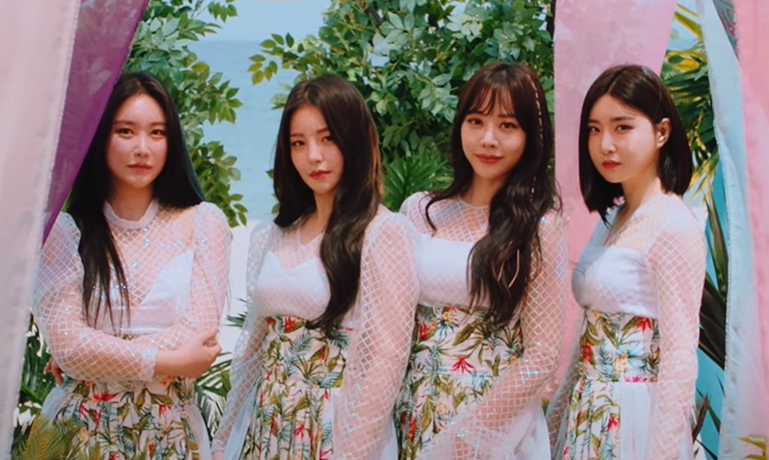
- BB Girls in 2021; From left to right: Minyoung, Youjoung (former), Eunji, and Yuna

Background information
- Origin: Seoul, South Korea
- Genres: K-pop; tropical house; Retro
- Years active: 2011–2013; 2016–present
- Labels: Brave; Warner Music Korea; BB Girls Company; GLG
- Members: Minyoung; Eunji; Yuna
- Past members: See former members
- Website: Official website

BB Girls (Korean: 브브걸; RR: Beubeugeol; formerly known as Brave Girls) is a South Korean girl group consisting of members Minyoung, Eunji, and Yuna.

BB Girls originally debuted as a quintet named Brave Girls with the single album The Difference on April 7, 2011 under the label Brave Entertainment and active with originally line-up until 2013 prior going hiatus. The group returned in 2016, with two original members (Yoojin and Hyeran) and five new members (Minyoung, Youjoung, Eunji, Yuna, and Hayun), releasing digital single "Deepened". Their two original members later stop promotions and remained five-members released EP Rollin'.

The group unexpectedly went viral in 2021, with the lineup consisting of Minyoung, Youjoung, Eunji and Yuna becoming the most well known after their song "Rollin'" (2017). As a result, they gained a huge spike in popularity and topped the Circle Digital Chart with "Rollin'", while achieving two further top-five hits with "We Ride" (2020) and "Chi Mat Ba Ram" (2021). The group won numerous accolades that year, including a Golden Disc Award, Melon Music Award, and Mnet Asian Music Award.

In February 2023, Brave Entertainment announced the group officially disbanded after the members left the agency. Two months later, the four members signed with Warner Music Korea and continued as a group with changed their name to BB Girls. Following the expiration of their contract a year later, Minyoung, Eunji, and Yuna established their own label BB Girls Company and signed with GLG Entertainment to continue group activities as a trio in 2024.

== History ==
=== Pre-debut ===
On September 21, 2010, Brave Brothers revealed he is launching a new 4-member hip-hop girl group called Brave Girls. On March 14, 2011, Eunyoung was revealed as the leader of the group. She is the niece of Shin Ha-kyun, an actor known for his roles in Welcome to Dongmakgol and Sympathy for Lady Vengeance. Hyeran was then revealed on March 17 and gained attention due to her resemblance to singer Son Dambi and old dance rehearsal videos that led to her name being featured on video sites like Mgoon. Yejin also gained attention due to the fact that she was 'Miss Seattle' at the Miss Korea 2008 competition, and because she bears a resemblance to actress Kim Sa-rang. Seo-a also gained attention for her previous career as a model for various magazines and commercials.

=== 2011–2015: Debut, Back to da Future, Re-Issue and hiatus ===
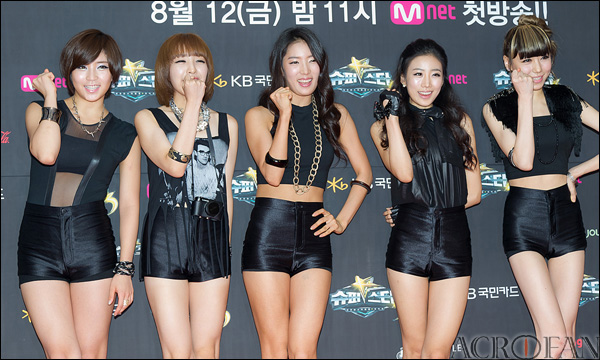
Brave Girls at Superstar K 3 premiere, 2011.

On March 31, 2011, Brave Brothers released two teaser images of the group, revealing the two concepts that the group would perform with. On April 7, they released their debut single album The Difference, along with a music video for title track "Do You Know". A music video for "So Sexy" was released on July 10.

On July 28, BB Girls released the lead single from their debut mini-album Back to da Future titled "Easily", which features Korean reggae artist Skull, and its music video. Brave Brothers stated that the song was homage to Kim Gun-mo's "Excuse". The EP was released on July 29 and peaked at number 14 on the Gaon Album Chart, selling 1,606 copies. At the 19th Korea Culture Entertainment Awards which was held on December 15, the group received the "Rookie of the Year" award.

On February 22, 2012, BB Girls released their second mini-album Re-Issue and held a promotional showcase for the album that included a guest performance from Teen Top. The EP peaked at #14 on the Gaon Album Chart. On August 31, 2013, Brave Girls released a single titled "For You".

=== 2016–2020: Lineup changes, High Heels and Rollin' ===
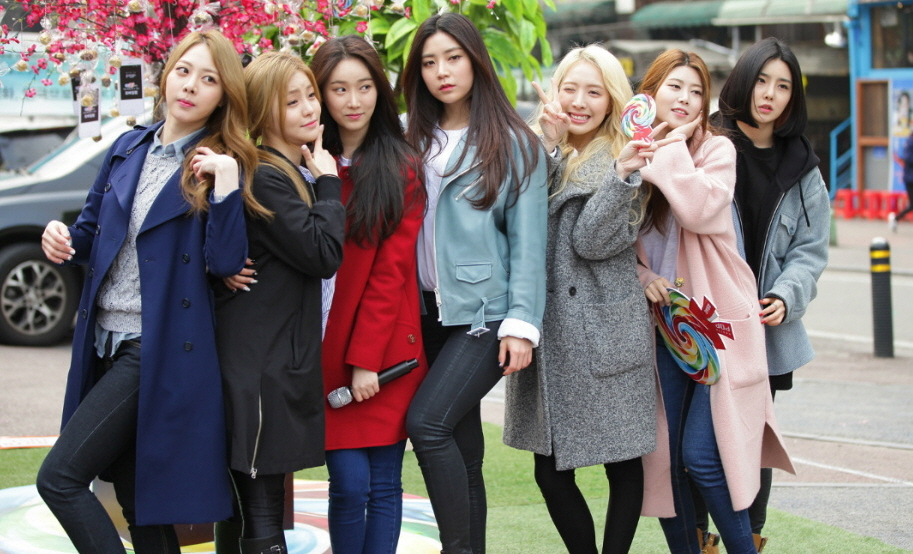
Brave Girls in March 2016.

After a 2 1/2-year hiatus, it was announced that BB Girls would be making a comeback as a seven-member group, with two original members (Yoojin and Hyeran) and five new members (Minyoung, Youjoung, Eunji, Yuna, and Hayun). The group released a digital single titled "Deepened" on February 16. On June 19, BB Girls released their third mini-album High Heels and the music video for its title track "High Heels". On September 1, the group released a digital single titled "Yoo-hoo".

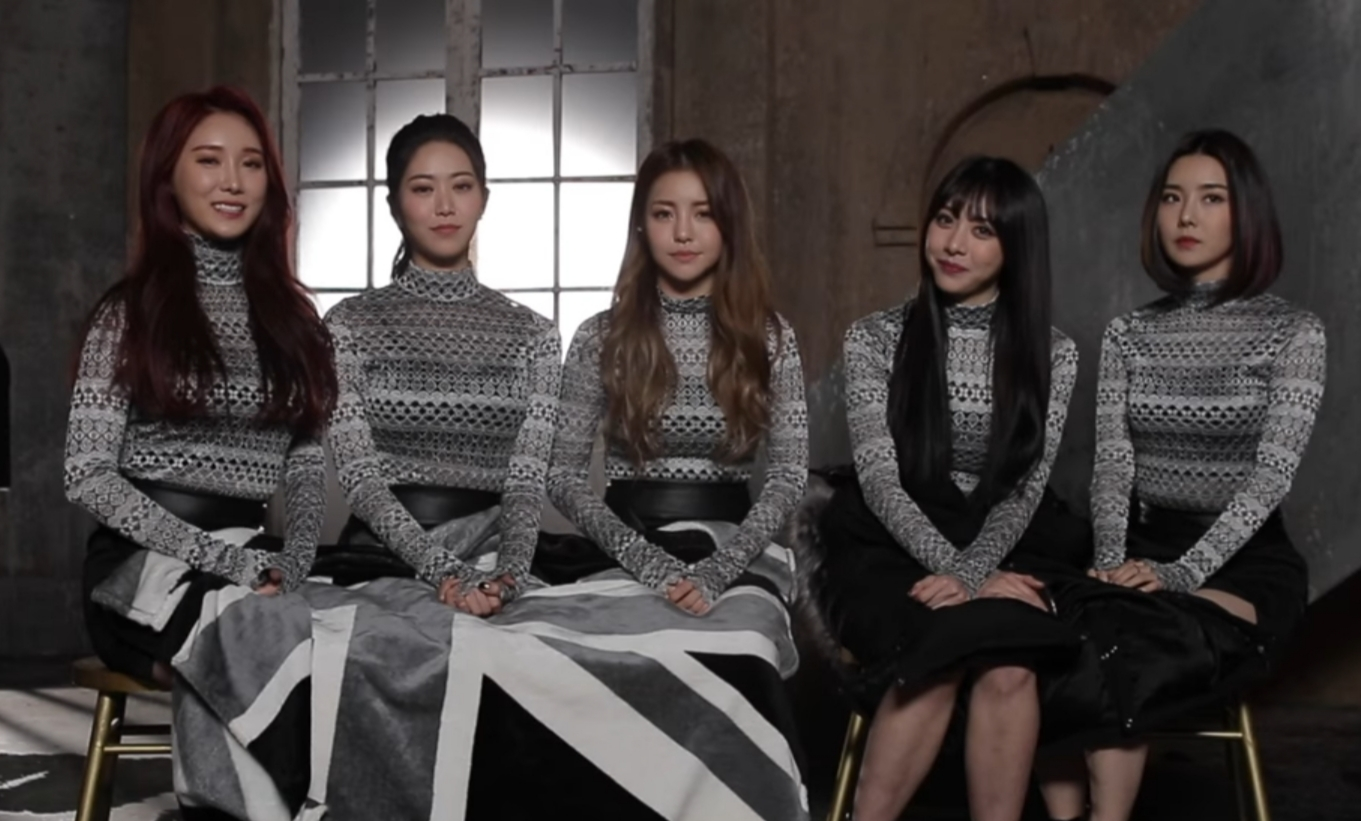
Brave Girls in the making of "Rollin" music video, 2017.

On January 13, 2017, it was announced that members Yoojin and Hyeran, the two remaining original members, would stop promotions with the group. Member Yoojin decided to quit the group after she majored her Degree in Theater from Chung-Ang University and wanted to complete her education. Meanwhile, member Hyeran would take a hiatus due to health concerns. It was noted that no new members would be added, and Brave Girls would continue promotions as a five-member group with members Minyoung, Youjoung, Eunji, Yuna and Hayun for a possible return in February or March with a new release. The group released their fourth mini album Rollin' and the lead single of the same name on March 7. In October 2017, members Youjoung, Eunji, and Yuna participated in the idol rebooting show The Unit which premiered on October 28. Youjoung and Eunji passed the audition. Eunji was eliminated in 45th place during the first elimination round while Youjoung was eliminated in 37th place during the second elimination round.

On August 11, 2018, the group released "Rollin' (New Version)", a rearranged version of the single of the same name released in 2017, as a gift to fans for their passionate support for the song in the prior year and a half. It was also announced that the group will promote as a 4-member piece for the time being, since member Hayun will take a break for health reasons.

On August 14, 2020, BB Girls returned after almost three years with a four-member lineup, including Minyoung, Youjoung, Eunji and Yuna, by releasing a digital single titled "We Ride". Later in 2020, the group was featured in a webtoon series produced by Toontori and supported by the Ministry of Culture, Sports and Tourism of South Korea. They were one of eight groups selected as part of the 2020 Hallyu Linked Support Project hosted by the Korea International Cultural Exchange Promotion Agency in association with Korea's Webtoon Industry Association.

=== 2021–2022: Mainstream breakthrough, Summer Queen, After 'We Ride', Thank You ===
In February 2021, a compilation video of BB Girls performing "Rollin'" became viral on YouTube. As a result, the song gained a surge in popularity and rose to the top of real-time music charts. In response, the group resumed promotional activities for the song. Member Youjoung revealed that prior to the song becoming viral, the group was near disbandment as she and fellow member Yuna had already moved out of their dorm.

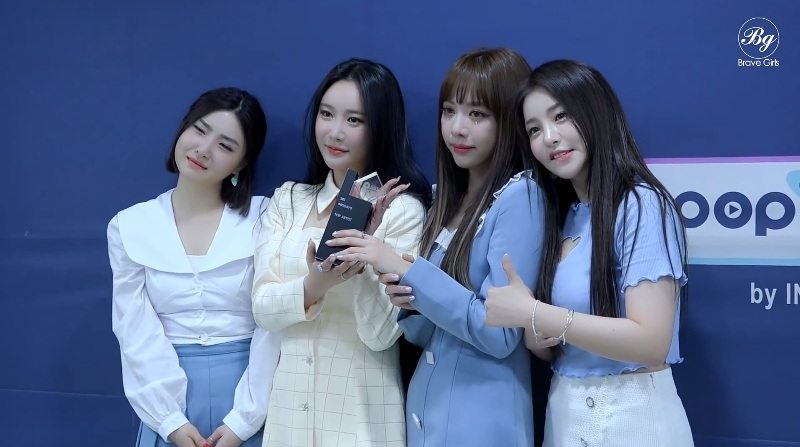
Brave Girls in March 2021

On March 14, BB Girls received their first music show win on Inkigayo with "Rollin'", 1,854 days after the group's debut date, which at the time was the longest time period between debut and first win for any girl group. BB Girls' newfound popularity also drew attention to "We Ride", which returned to the Gaon Digital Chart at number 115, eventually peaking at number four.

On April 29, BB Girls released a special version of "High Heels" in collaboration with shoe brand Elcanto. On July 16, they released a promotional single titled "Red Sun" for Lotte Department Store advertising campaign. On June 17, the group released their fifth extended play Summer Queen and its lead single "Chi Mat Ba Ram". The album peaked at number 3 on the Gaon Album Chart and the song peaked at the same position on the Gaon Digital Chart.

On August 23, BB Girls released the repackaged version of their fifth extended play After 'We Ride' with the lead single of the same name.

On January 14, 2022, it was announced that Minyoung would be suspending her activities temporarily due to poor health conditions.

On March 14, BB Girls made their comeback with their sixth extended play Thank You and its lead single of the same name.

In May, it was announced that BB Girls would hold a concert in the United States in July 2022. On May 17, Brave Entertainment announced that BB Girls would release a new single that reinterprets Brown Eyed Girls 2008 hit "How Come". It was released on music streaming platforms on May 23.

=== 2023–2024: Disbandment and rebranding as BB Girls ===
On February 15, 2023, BB Girls announced their plans to release a new single "Goodbye", which lead to speculation that the group was intending on disbanding after their contract expiration. It was subsequently confirmed by Brave Entertainment that the group would disband after all four members chose not to renew their contracts with the company. "Goodbye", intended as a farewell song, was released on the same day. The following day, Minyoung assured fans that the group's disbandment would be temporary, and that they would eventually reunite in the future.

On April 26, all 4 members signed with Warner Music Korea with plans to release new music in the summer. It was also announced that "various possibilities" were being discussed regarding the continued use of the group's name. On May 3, it was announced that the group would be continuing as BB Girls, with their first single album titled One More Time, which was released on August 3, 2023.

On August 20, Brave Entertainment released "Brave Girls Best Album", an unannounced greatest hits compilation album featuring 8 songs with reimagined compositions from the former group's catalogue ranging from Brave Girls' debut songs "Do you know", "Easily", "High Heels", "NowadaysYou", and "Yoo Hoo" to the more recent "Rollin'," "We Ride" and "Chi Mat Ba Ram." This is the only album to feature vocals from all 10 of the past members. On August 24, the album was released as a jewel case CD with a 12 paged lyric booklet describing each of the new song arrangements.

=== 2024–present: Reformation as a trio ===
On April 22, 2024, Warner Music Korea announced the contract termination with BB Girls following its expiration after a year. It was also announced that Youjoung would be leaving the group and BB Girls would continue their activities as a trio under their own indie label, BB Girls Company. However, on December 11, BB Girls signed an exclusive contract with GLG Entertainment.

On January 15, 2025, BB Girls released their second single album Love 2. On July 16, 2026, BB Girls released their third single album Body Wave.

== Members ==
=== Current ===
- Minyoung (민영)
- Eunji (은지)
- Yuna (유나)

=== Brave Girls' former line-up ===
- Eunyoung (은영)
- Seo-a (서아)
- Yejin (예진)
- Yoojin (유진)
- Hyeran (혜란)
- Hayun (하윤)

=== BB Girls' former line-up ===
- Youjoung (유정)

== Discography ==
Extended plays

- Back to da Future (2011)
- Re-Issue (2012)
- High Heels (2016)
- Rollin' (2017)
- Summer Queen (2021)
- Thank You (2022)

== Filmography ==
=== Television shows ===
Year	Title	Role	Ref.
2022	Queendom 2	Contestant	

=== Web shows ===
Year	Title	Role	Notes	Ref.
2022	Saturday Night Live Korea	Host	Season 2 (Episode 15)	

== Awards and nominations ==
Name of the award ceremony, year presented, category, nominee of the award, and the result of the nomination
Award ceremony	Year	Category	Nominee / Work	Result	Ref.
Asia Artist Awards	2021	Best Artist Award – Singer	BB Girls	Won	
Asia Artist Awards	2021	Hot Trend Award	BB Girls	Won	
Asia Artist Awards	2021	Popularity Award – Idol Group (Female)	BB Girls	Nominated	
Asia Artist Awards	2023	Popularity Award – Singer (Female)	BB Girls	Nominated	
Asia Model Awards	2021	Popular Star Award	BB Girls	Won	
Brand of the Year Awards	2021	Female Idol	BB Girls	Won	
Brand of the Year Awards	2021	Hot Icon	BB Girls	Won	
Broadcasting Advertising Festival	2021	CF Star of the Year	BB Girls	Won	
The Fact Music Awards	2021	Artist of the Year (Bonsang)	BB Girls	Won	
The Fact Music Awards	2023	Best Music – Fall	"One More Time"	Nominated	
Forbes Korea K-Pop Awards	2021	Female Popularity Award	BB Girls	Won	
Gaon Chart Music Awards	2022	Song of the Year – June	"Chi Mat Ba Ram"	Won	
Gaon Chart Music Awards	2022	Mubeat Global Choice Award – Female	BB Girls	Nominated	
Golden Disc Awards	2022	Best Group	BB Girls	Won	
Golden Disc Awards	2022	Best Digital Song (Bonsang)	"Chi Mat Ba Ram"	Nominated	
Korea Arts & Culture Awards	2021	Popular Singer	BB Girls	Won	
Korea Broadcasting Awards	2021	Best Female Artist	BB Girls	Won	
Korea Culture Entertainment Awards	2011	Rookie of the Year	BB Girls	Won	
Melon Music Awards	2021	Hot Trend Award	BB Girls	Won	
Melon Music Awards	2021	Album of the Year	Summer Queen	Nominated	
Melon Music Awards	2021	Best Female Group	BB Girls	Nominated	
Melon Music Awards	2021	Netizen Popularity Award	BB Girls	Nominated	
Melon Music Awards	2021	Top 10 Artist Award	BB Girls	Nominated	
Mnet Asian Music Awards	2011	Best New Female Artists	BB Girls	Nominated	
Mnet Asian Music Awards	2021	KTO Breakout Artist	BB Girls	Won	
Mnet Asian Music Awards	2021	Album of the Year	Summer Queen	Longlisted	
Mnet Asian Music Awards	2021	Artist of the Year	BB Girls	Longlisted	
Mnet Asian Music Awards	2021	Best Female Group	BB Girls	Nominated	
Mnet Asian Music Awards	2021	Worldwide Fans' Choice Top 10	BB Girls	Nominated	
Mnet Asian Music Awards	2022	Worldwide Fans' Choice Top 10	BB Girls	Nominated	
Seoul Music Awards	2022	Main Award (Bonsang)	BB Girls	Won	
Seoul Music Awards	2022	K-Wave Popularity Award	BB Girls	Nominated	
Seoul Music Awards	2022	Popularity Award	BB Girls	Nominated	
Seoul Music Awards	2022	U+Idol Live Best Artist Award	BB Girls	Nominated	

== Ambassadorship ==
Year	Title	Ref.
2021	Honorary Ambassador of Korea Tourism – The Myth of Reverse Running	
2021	Road Traffic Authority PR Ambassador	
