= Brave Entertainment =

South Korean entertainment company

- Type: Private
- Industry: Music; Entertainment
- Genre: K-pop; hip hop; R&B; electronic
- Founded: February 2008
- Founder: Kang Dong Chul
- Headquarters: Dangyung Building 74-3 Nov Nonhyundong, Gangnam-gu, Seoul, South Korea
- Key people: Kang Dong-chul
- Owner: Kang Dong-chul
- Website: www.bravesound.com

Brave Entertainment (Korean: 브레이브 엔터테인먼트; also known as Brave Sound Entertainment) is a South Korean entertainment company founded in 2008 by Brave Brothers.

== Company ==
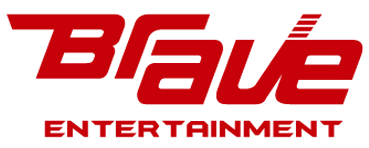
Former logo

Brave Entertainment was founded in 2008 by Kang Dong Chul, known by his stage name Brave Brothers, after he left YG Entertainment. Brave Entertainment's Brave Brothers has collaborated with Starship Entertainment when it was revealed that he produced Sistar's debut song "Push Push", and has been producing songs for them, including their hit song, "So Cool" and "Alone".

=== 2020-Present: Recent changes and new groups ===
On February 3, 2020 Brave Entertainment debuted the boy group DKB, 8 years after their last boy group Big Star. The group consist of 8 boys which are E-Chan, D1, GK, Heechan, Lune, Junseo, Yuku, and Harry-June.

On May 30, 2022 Brave Entertainment introduced their first virtual solo artist (NFT) by the name Hip-Kongz with the single "Bam".

On March 27, 2024, Brave Entertainment debuted the new girl group Candy Shop. Which consist of 4 members which are Yuina, Soram, Sui, and Sarang. On May 9, Brave Entertainment announced that Yuina would temporarily halt her activities due to health-related issues. In addition, Julia was added to the group on May 13 to fill in her spot and was added to the group.

== Artists ==
=== Recording artists ===
Groups

- DKB
- Candy Shop

Solo

- Hip-Kongz (virtual soloist)

Producers

- Brave Brothers
- Maboos (마부스)
- Chakun (차쿤)
- JS
- RedCookie (레드쿠키)

== Former artists ==
=== Former recording artists ===
- 1Punch (2015)
  - One (2015)
  - Samuel (2015–2021)
- Elephant Kingdom (20??–2016)
- Brave Girls (2011–2023)
  - Park Eunyoung (2011–2013)
  - Park SeoA (2011–2013)
  - Han Yejin (2011–2013)
  - Jung Yoo-jin (2011–2017)
  - Noh Hye-ran (2011–2019)
  - Lee Ha-yun (2015–2019)
  - Kim Min-young (2015–2023)
  - Nam Yu-jeong (2015–2023)
  - Hong Eun-ji (2015–2023)
  - Lee Yu-na (2015–2023)
- Big Star (2012–2019)
  - Feeldog (2012–2019)
  - Baram (2012–2019)
  - Raehwan (2012–2019)
  - Sunghak (2012–2019)
  - Jude (2012–2019)
- Electroboyz
- 2CHAMP
- Cherrsee (2016-2021)
- Park Soo-jin

=== Former actors/actresses ===
- Kim Sa-rang
- Jung Man-sik
- Oh Kwang-suk / Feeldog
