= List of Gaon Digital Chart number ones of 2021 =

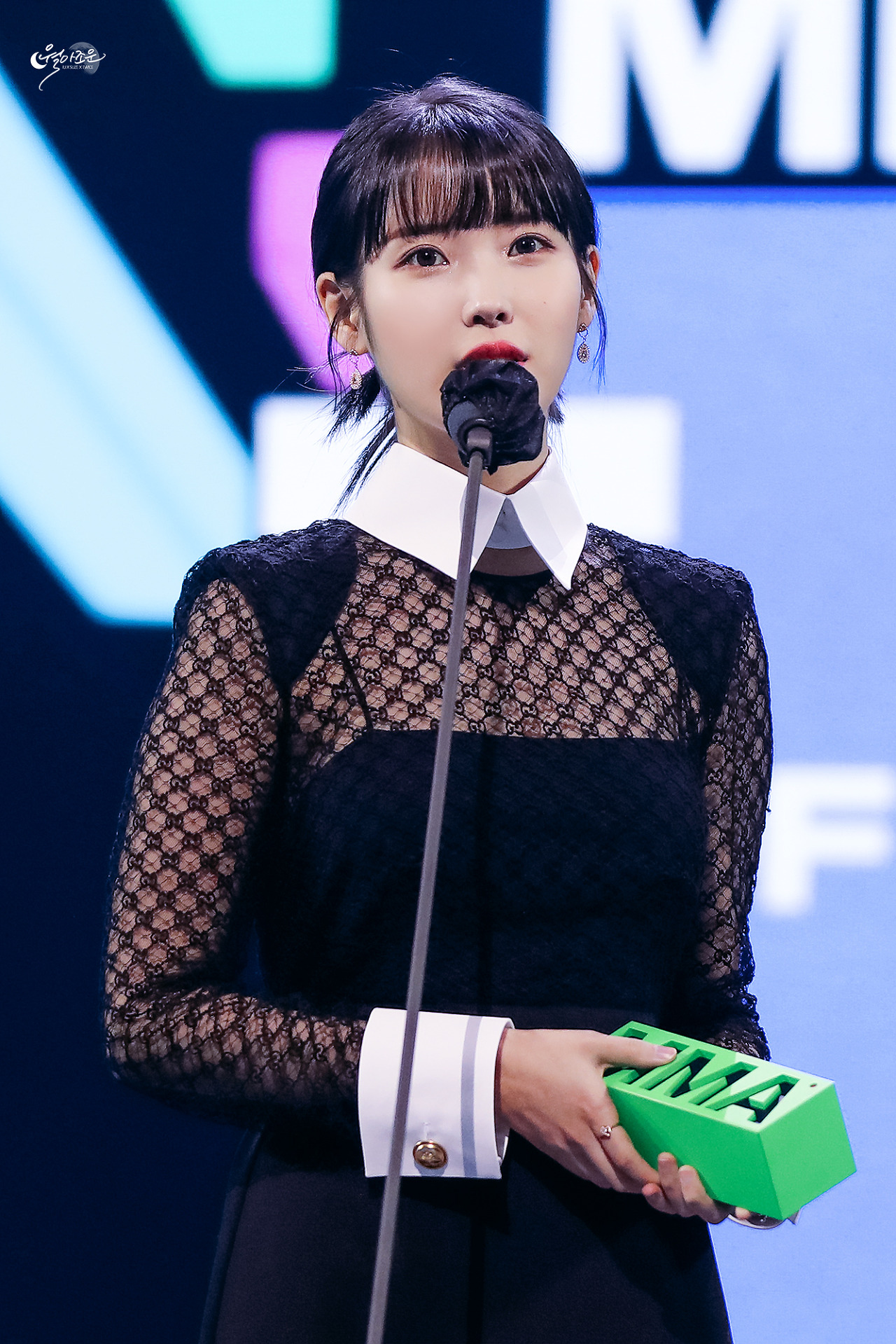
IU topped the chart for twelve weeks with four singles—"Celebrity", "Lilac", "Nakka" (with AKMU), and "Strawberry Moon". "Celebrity" was the best-performing song of the year.

The Gaon Digital Chart, now known as the Circle Digital Chart, is a chart that ranks the best-performing singles in South Korea. Managed by the domestic Ministry of Culture, Sports and Tourism (MCST), its data is compiled by the Korea Music Content Industry Association and published by the Gaon Music Chart. The ranking is based collectively on each single's download sales, stream count, and background music use. In mid-2008, the Recording Industry Association of Korea ceased publishing music sales data. The MCST established a process to collect music sales in 2009, and began publishing its data with the introduction of the Gaon Music Chart the following February. With the creation of the Gaon Digital Chart, digital data for individual songs was provided in the country for the first time. Gaon provides weekly (listed from Sunday to Saturday), monthly, and yearly charts.

Twenty singles reached number one on the Digital Chart in 2021. "VVS" was the first song to top the ranking, doing so for two consecutive weeks. IU had four number-ones on the chart during the year—"Celebrity", "Lilac", "Nakka" (with AKMU), and "Strawberry Moon". "Celebrity" spent six consecutive weeks at number one and was the best-performing song of the year per Gaon's year-end report published in January 2022. "Rollin'" by Brave Girls became a sleeper hit, going viral in February and entering the chart in March for the first time in the four years since its release. It spent five non-consecutive weeks at number one, and ranked second on the year-end chart. "Stay" by Australian singer the Kid Laroi, and Canadian singer Justin Bieber, became the first song by an all non-South Korean act to top Gaon's weekly chart since its inception in 2010. "Celebrity", "Rollin'", "Butter" by BTS, "Foolish Love" by M.O.M, and "Stay" were the only songs to spend at least five weeks atop the chart.

On the monthly charts, IU had three number-one songs during the year: "Celebrity" topped the chart for February, "Lilac" for April, and "Strawberry Moon" for November. Brave Girls is the only artist to top the monthly chart twice with the same song: "Rollin'" was number one for March and May.

== Weekly charts ==
Key
†	Indicates best-performing single of 2021

Week ending date	Song	Artist(s)	Ref.
January 2	"VVS"	Mirani, Munchman, Khundi Panda, Mushvenom featuring Justhis	
January 9	"VVS"	Mirani, Munchman, Khundi Panda, Mushvenom featuring Justhis	
January 16	"Shiny Star (2020)" (밤하늘의 별을(2020))	KyoungSeo	
January 23	"Shiny Star (2020)" (밤하늘의 별을(2020))	KyoungSeo	
January 30	"Celebrity" †	IU	
February 6	"Celebrity" †	IU	
February 13	"Celebrity" †	IU	
February 20	"Celebrity" †	IU	
February 27	"Celebrity" †	IU	
March 6	"Celebrity" †	IU	
March 13	"My Starry Love" (별빛 같은 나의 사랑아)	Lim Young-woong	
March 20	"Rollin'" (롤린)	Brave Girls	
March 27	"Rollin'" (롤린)	Brave Girls	
April 3	"Lilac" (라일락)	IU	
April 10	"Lilac" (라일락)	IU	
April 17	"Antidote"	Kang Daniel	
April 24	"Rollin'" (롤린)	Brave Girls	
May 1	"Rollin'" (롤린)	Brave Girls	
May 8	"Rollin'" (롤린)	Brave Girls	
May 15	"Hot Sauce" (맛)	NCT Dream	
May 22	"Dun Dun Dance"	Oh My Girl	
May 29	"Butter"	BTS	
June 5	"Butter"	BTS	
June 12	"Butter"	BTS	
June 19	"Butter"	BTS	
June 26	"Butter"	BTS	
July 3	"Foolish Love" (바라만 본다)	M.O.M (MSG Wannabe)	
July 10	"Foolish Love" (바라만 본다)	M.O.M (MSG Wannabe)	
July 17	"Foolish Love" (바라만 본다)	M.O.M (MSG Wannabe)	
July 24	"Foolish Love" (바라만 본다)	M.O.M (MSG Wannabe)	
July 31	"Foolish Love" (바라만 본다)	M.O.M (MSG Wannabe)	
August 7	"Nakka" (낙하)	AKMU with IU	
August 14	"Traffic Light" (신호등)	Lee Mu-jin	
August 21	"Traffic Light" (신호등)	Lee Mu-jin	
August 28	"Traffic Light" (신호등)	Lee Mu-jin	
September 4	"Stay"	The Kid Laroi and Justin Bieber	
September 11	"Stay"	The Kid Laroi and Justin Bieber	
September 18	"Stay"	The Kid Laroi and Justin Bieber	
September 25	"Stay"	The Kid Laroi and Justin Bieber	
October 2	"Stay"	The Kid Laroi and Justin Bieber	
October 9	"Stay"	The Kid Laroi and Justin Bieber	
October 16	"Love Always Runs Away" (사랑은 늘 도망가)	Lim Young-woong	
October 23	"Strawberry Moon"	IU	
October 30	"Strawberry Moon"	IU	
November 6	"Strawberry Moon"	IU	
November 13	"Breathe" (쉬어)	Anandelight, Unofficialboyy, Be'O, Geegooin and Mudd the Student featuring Mino	
November 20	"Merry-Go-Round" (회전목마)	Sokodomo featuring Zion.T and Wonstein	
November 27	"Limousine" (리무진)	Be'O featuring Mino	
December 4	"Limousine" (리무진)	Be'O featuring Mino	
December 11	"Merry-Go-Round" (회전목마)	Sokodomo featuring Zion.T and Wonstein	
December 18	"Counting Stars"	Be'O featuring Beenzino	
December 25	"Counting Stars"	Be'O featuring Beenzino	

== Monthly charts ==
Month	Song	Artist(s)	Ref.
January	"Shiny Star (2020)" (밤하늘의 별을(2020))	KyoungSeo	
February	"Celebrity"	IU	
March	"Rollin'" (롤린)	Brave Girls	
April	"Lilac" (라일락)	IU	
May	"Rollin'" (롤린)	Brave Girls	
June	"Butter"	BTS	
July	"Foolish Love" (바라만 본다)	M.O.M (MSG Wannabe)	
August	"Traffic Light" (신호등)	Lee Mu-jin	
September	"Stay"	The Kid Laroi and Justin Bieber	
October	"Love Always Runs Away" (사랑은 늘 도망가)	Lim Young-woong	
November	"Strawberry Moon"	IU	
December	"Merry-Go-Round" (회전목마)	Sokodomo featuring Zion.T and Wonstein	
