= 2021 Melon Music Awards =

South Korean music award show

- 2021 Melon Music Awards title card
- Awarded for: Excellence in music and singing
- Date: December 4, 2021
- Location: South Korea
- Presented by: Melon
- Hosted by: Lee Yong-jin, Park Seon-young

Highlights
- Most awards: IU & BTS (5)
- Most nominations: IU (7)
- Artist of the Year: IU
- Album of the Year: Lilac
- Song of the Year: "Butter"
- Record of the Year: Aespa
- Website: Melon 2021

Television/radio coverage
- Network: 1theK; Daum; Melon; YouTube; KakaoTV; Joox (Note: Selected territories only.) dTV and Music On! TV (Japan); MyMusic (Taiwan)

The 2021 Melon Music Awards, organized by Kakao M and Melon, took place on December 4, 2021. This was the thirteenth ceremony in the show's history, and the second to be held without an audience in light of the COVID-19 pandemic. Hosted by comedian Lee Yong-jin and radio announcer Park Seon-young, the ceremony was broadcast online through KakaoTV, Melon, and 1theK's official YouTube channel. Artists who released music between November 11, 2020, and November 7, 2021, were eligible for and honored at the awards.

IU, BTS, and Aespa won the Daesangs for Artist of the Year and Album of the Year, Song of the Year, and Record of the Year respectively.

== Judging criteria ==
Division	Online Voting	Digital Sales	Judge Score
Top 10 Artists	20%	80%	—
Main awards*	20%	60%	20%
Genre Awards**	—	70%	30%
Popularity Awards***	60%	40%	—
Special Awards****	—	—	100%
*Artist of the Year, Album of the Year, Song of the Year, Best New Artist, Best Male/Female Solo, Best Male/Female Group; **OST Award, Hot Trend Award, Project Music Award; ***Netizen Popularity Award, KaKao Hot Star Award; ****Record of the Year, Stage of the Year, Music Video Award, Song Writer Award, 1theK Performance Award

=== Voting ===
Voting for Melon's Top 10 Artists category opened on the Melon Music website on November 8 and continued until November 22, 2021. Only artists who released music between November 11, 2020, and November 7, 2021, are eligible. The longlist of nominees was selected based on a chart performance score (60% downloads and 40% streams) for each artist combined with weekly Melon Popularity Award votes achieved during the eligibility period. Voting by Category awards, including nine categories: Top 10 Artists, Album of the Year, Song of the Year, Best New Artist, Best Male Solo, Best Female Solo, Best Male Group, Best Female Group, and Netizen Popularity Award.

== Performances ==
List of musical performances
Artist	Song(s)	Segment	Ref(s)
STAYC	"Stereotype" "ASAP"	Beyond This Step	
Enhypen	"Drunk-Dazed" "Tamed-Dashed"	Welcome To The EN-WORLD	
Brave Girls	"Rollin'" "Chi Mat Ba Ram"	The Queen's Theater	
Lee Mu-jin	"The Assignment Song" "Traffic Light"	The Colour is Blooming	
MSG Wannabe (M.O.M)	"Foolish Love"	Back To The Millenium	
Heize	"Happen"	Contes Des Quatre Saisons	
Tomorrow X Together	"0x1=Lovesong (I Know I Love You)" "Loser=Lover"	Shall ~~W~~e?	
The Boyz	"Maverick"	—	
Lim Young-woong	"Love Always Run Away" "My Starry Love"	By Your Side	
IU	"Strawberry Moon" "Celebrity" "Lilac"	tracklist 20. OUTRO	

== Presenters ==
Name(s)	Notes
Lee Yeon-hee	Top 10 Artists (IU & Lim Young-woong)
Jung Hyuk	Hot Trend Award + Best New Artist (Male)
Lee Chung-ah	Top 10 Artists (Heize & IllboI)
Lee Tae-hwan	Best Solo (Male) & (Female)
Park Se-ri	Best Music Style & Music Video of The Year
Kim Eana	Best OST + Best Songwriter
Jung Hye-sung	Top 10 Artists (Lee Mu-jin & Ash Island)
Kim Je-deok & Choi Ye-bin	Global Rising Artist + 1thek Original Contents
Yoon Sang	Album Of The Year + Artist Of The Year

== Winners and nominees ==
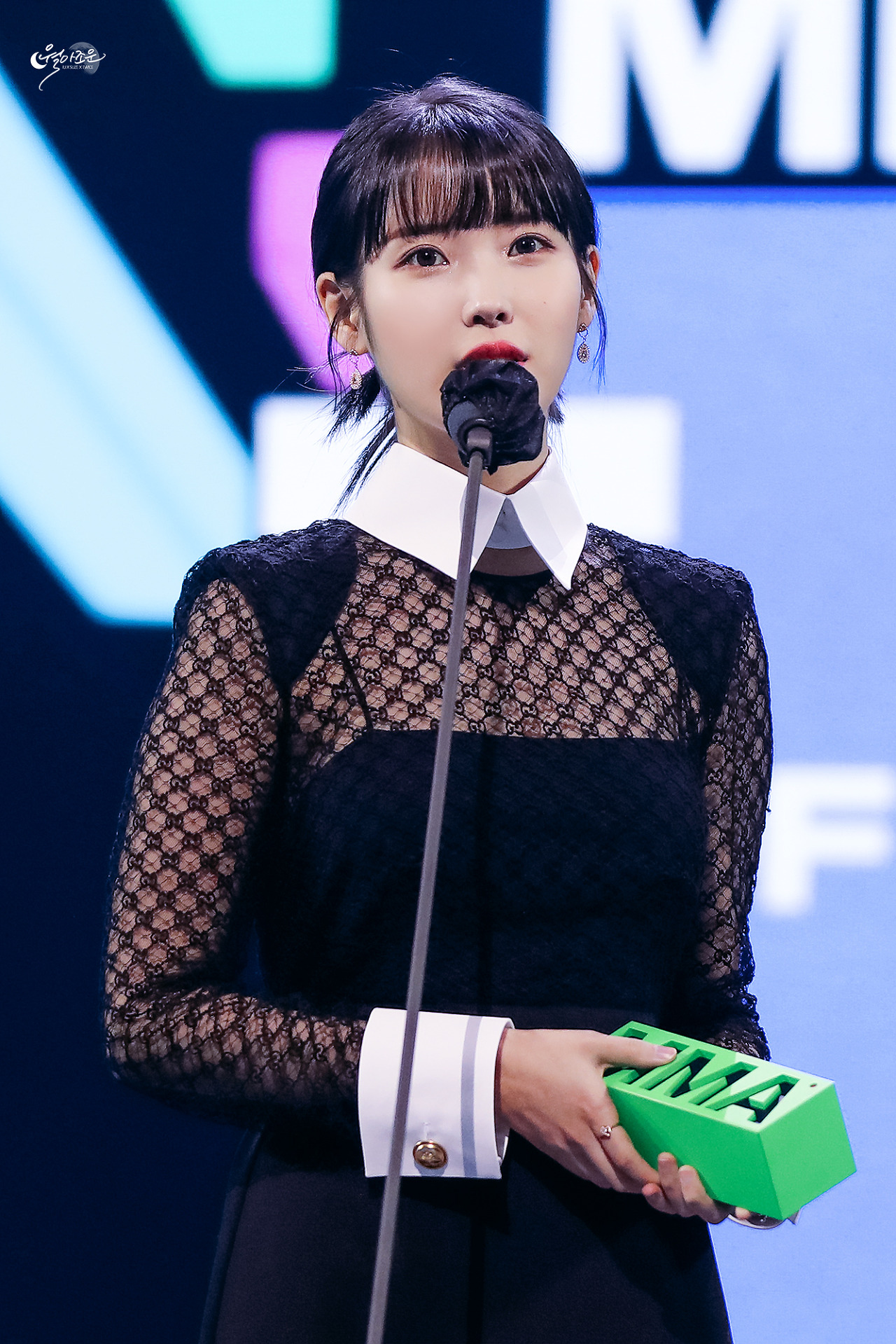
IU won five awards, including Artist of the Year (Daesang), Album of the Year (Daesang), Top 10 Artists (Bonsang), Best Female Solo, and Best Songwriter Award.

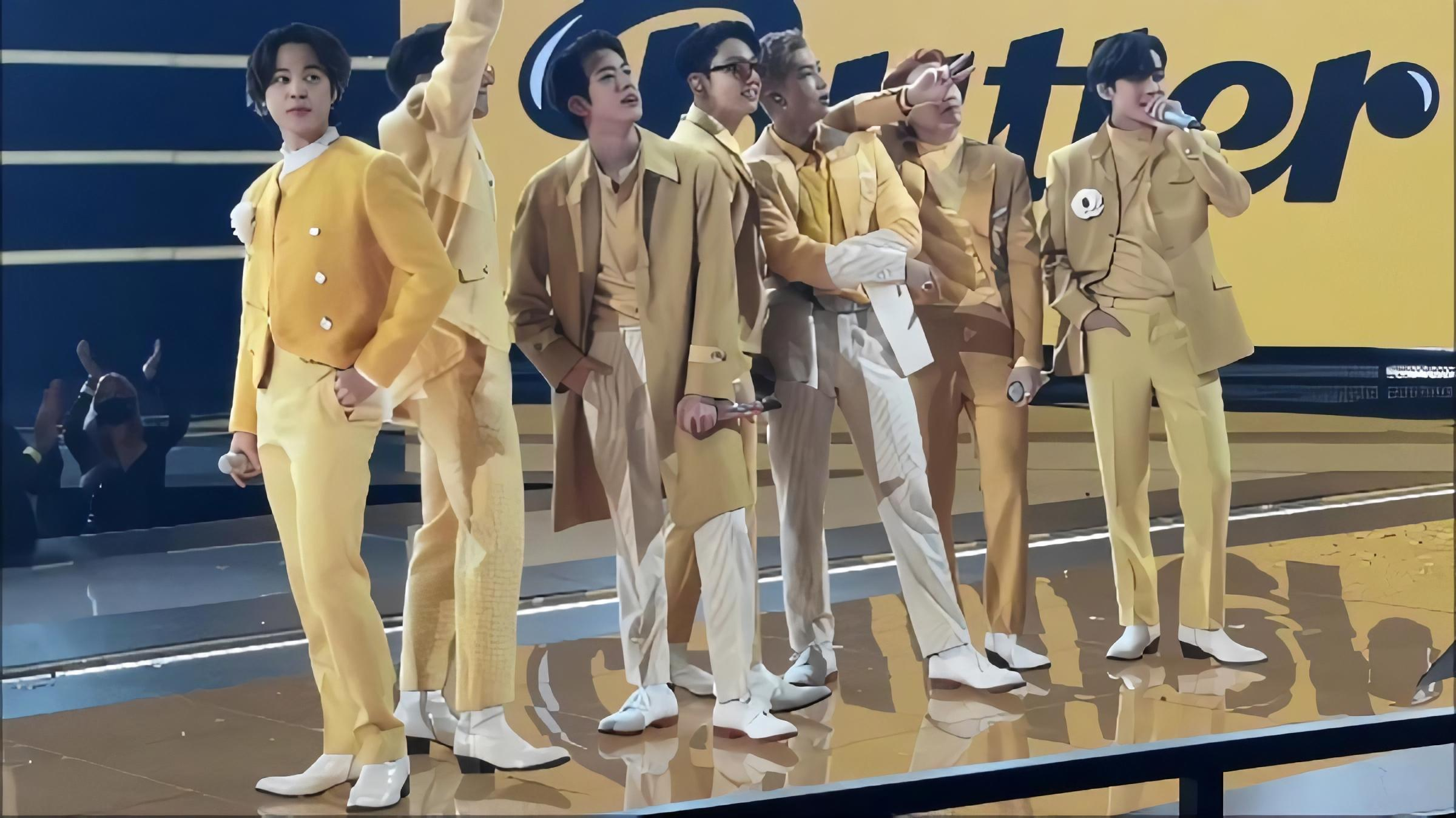
BTS also won five awards, including the Song of the Year (Daesang), Top 10 Artists (Bonsang), Best Male Group, Netizen Popularity Award, and Best Collaboration.

Winners are listed first and highlighted in bold.

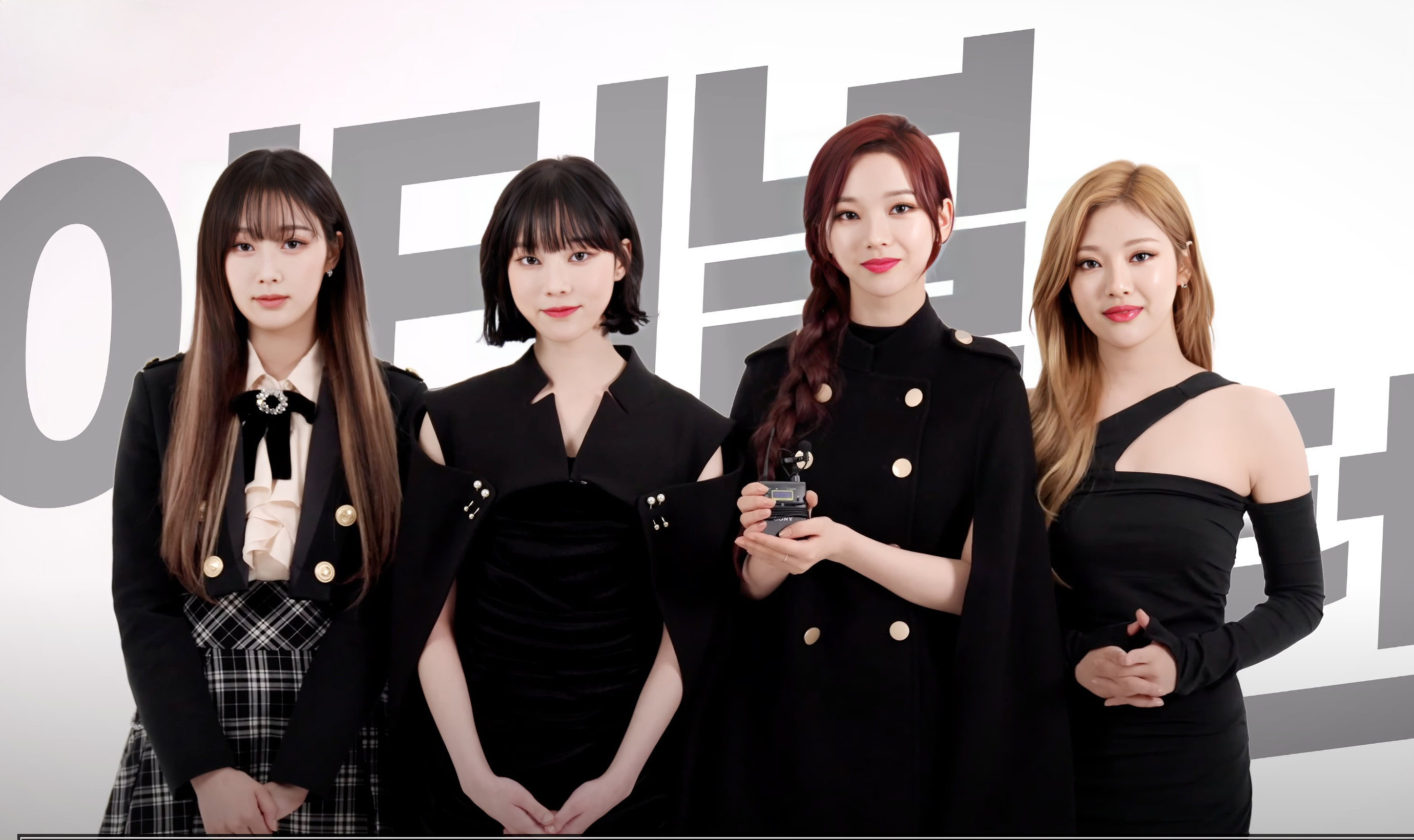
Aespa won four awards, including Record of the Year, Best Female Group, Best New Artist and Top 10 Artists.

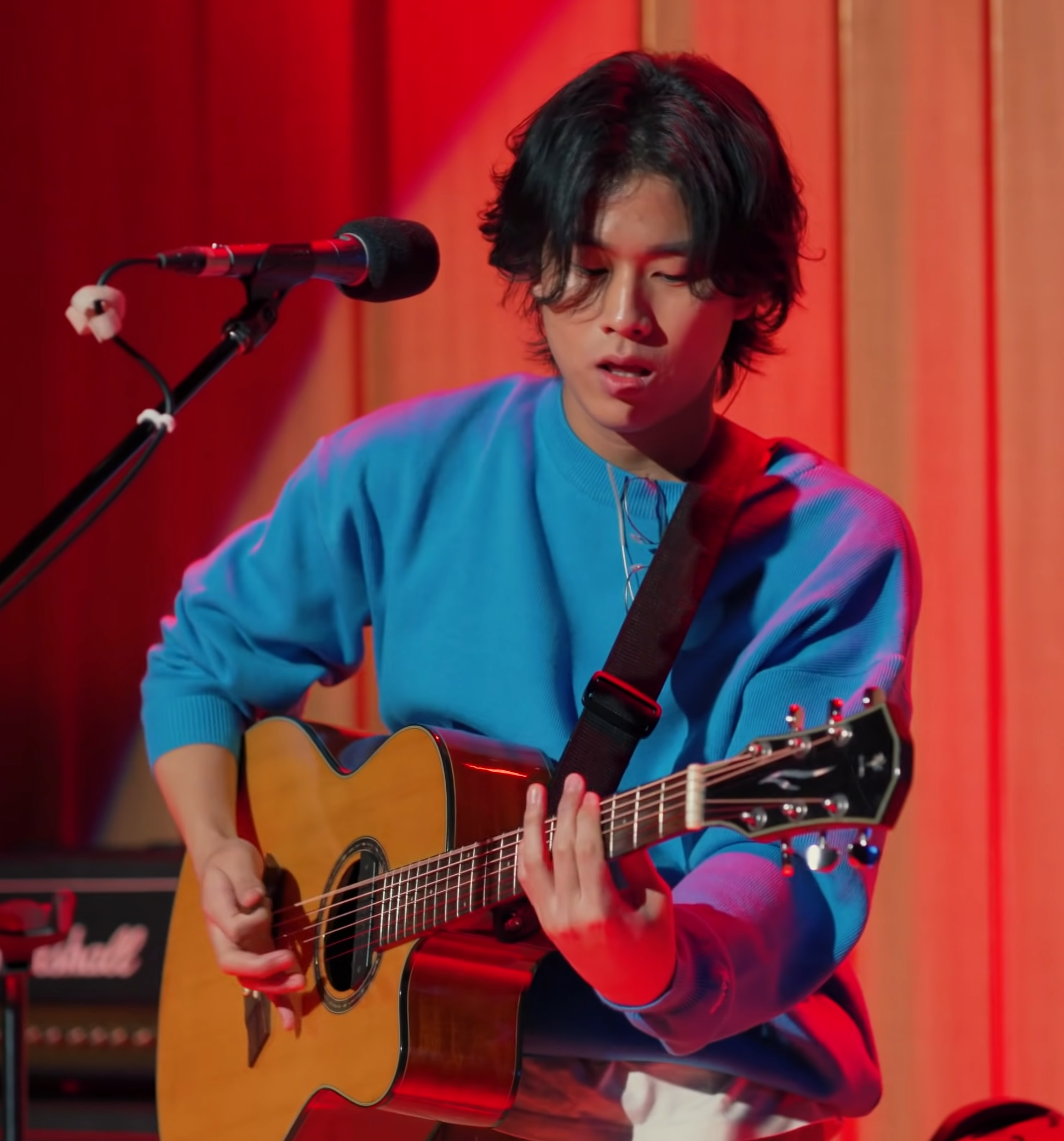
Lee Mu-jin won three awards: Best OST, Best New Artist and Top 10 Artists.

Top 10 Artists (Bonsang)	Song of the Year (Daesang)
**Aespa**; **AKMU**; **Ash Island**; **BTS**; **Heize**; **IU**; **Lee Mu-jin**; **Lil Boi**; **Lim Young-woong**; **NCT Dream**	**BTS – "Butter"**; Aespa – "Next Level"; Heize – "Happen"; IU – "Celebrity"; KyoungSeo – "Shiny Star (2020)"; Lee Mu-jin – "Traffic Light"; Miranni, Munchman, Kundi Panda, Mushvenom – "VVS"; Oh My Girl – "Dun Dun Dance"; Rosé – "On The Ground"; Song I-han – "I Will Be Your Shining Star"
Artist of the Year (Daesang)	Album of the Year (Daesang)
**IU**; Aespa; BTS; Lim Young-Woong; NCT Dream	**IU – Lilac**; AKMU – Next Episode; Baek Ye-rin – Tellusboutyourself; Brave Girls – Summer Queen; BTS – BE; Heize – Happen; Joy – Hello; NCT Dream – Hot Sauce; Oh My Girl – Dear OhMyGirl; Shinee – Don't Call Me
Record of the Year (Daesang)	Hot Trend Award
**Aespa**	**Brave Girls**
Best New Artist	Netizen Popularity Award
**Lee Mu-jin**; **Aespa**; Enhypen; Jeon Gunho; KyoungSeo; STAYC	**BTS**; Aespa; Brave Girls; (G)I-dle; IU; Oh My Girl; Red Velvet; Rosé; Taeyeon; Yang Yo-seob, Jung Eun-ji
Best Male Group	Best Female Group
**BTS**; Homies; NCT Dream; Seventeen; Shinee	**Aespa**; Brave Girls; Oh My Girl; STAYC; Twice
Best Male Solo	Best Female Solo
**Lim Young-woong**; 10cm; Ash Island; Lee Mu-jin; Lil Boi	**IU**; Heize; KyoungSeo; Rosé; Taeyeon
Best Collaboration	Best OST
**Coldplay and BTS – "My Universe"**	**Lee Mu-jin – "Rain and You"**

=== Other ===
Award	Winner(s)
Best Songwriter	IU
Best Music Style	Homies
Music Video of the Year	Tomorrow X Together
Best Project Music	MSG Wannabe (M.O.M)
Best Performance	The Boyz
Global Rising Artist	Enhypen
1theK Original Contents	STAYC
Best Performance Director	Son Sung-deuk
Best Session Instrumental	Guitar – Kim Dong-min; Bass – Go Tae-yeong; Keyboard – Gureum

=== Multiple awards ===
The following artist(s) received three or more awards:

Count	Artist(s)
5	IU
5	BTS
4	Aespa
3	Lee Mu-jin
