= 36th Golden Disc Awards =

2022 South Korean music awards ceremony

- Title card
- Date: January 8, 2022
- Venue: Gocheok Sky Dome
- Country: South Korea
- Hosted by: Lee Seung-gi; Lee Da-hee; Sung Si-kyung
- Website: goldendisc.co.kr

The 36th Golden Disc Awards (Korean: 36th 골든 디스크 시상식; RR: 36th Goldeun diseukeu sisangsik), was an award ceremony held on January 8, 2022, and broadcast through various television networks and streaming platforms in various countries. The ceremony was hosted by Lee Seung-gi, Lee Da-hee, and Sung Si-kyung.

== Criteria ==
All songs and albums that were eligible to be nominated were released between the end of November 2020 and the end of November 2021. Songs and albums that were excluded from the nominations in the 35th edition due to overlapping in the counting deadline were included in this edition.

| Category | Online voting | Panelist (Note: Panelist consisted of 50 people such as industry officials, K-pop reporters, music program producers, pop culture critics, major distribution officials, and Golden Disc Awards evaluation committee.) | Sales |
|---|---|---|---|
| Digital Daesang (Song of the Year) | —N/a | 40% | 60% |
| Disc Daesang (Album of the Year) | —N/a | 40% | 60% |
| Digital Song Bonsang | —N/a | 40% | 60% |
| Album Bonsang | —N/a | 40% | 60% |
| Rookie Artist of the Year (Note: Applies to all digital singles, extended plays/single albums with 6 or less songs, and studio albums.) | —N/a | 40% | 60% |
| Seezn Most Popular Artist Award | 100% | —N/a | |

== Winners and nominees ==
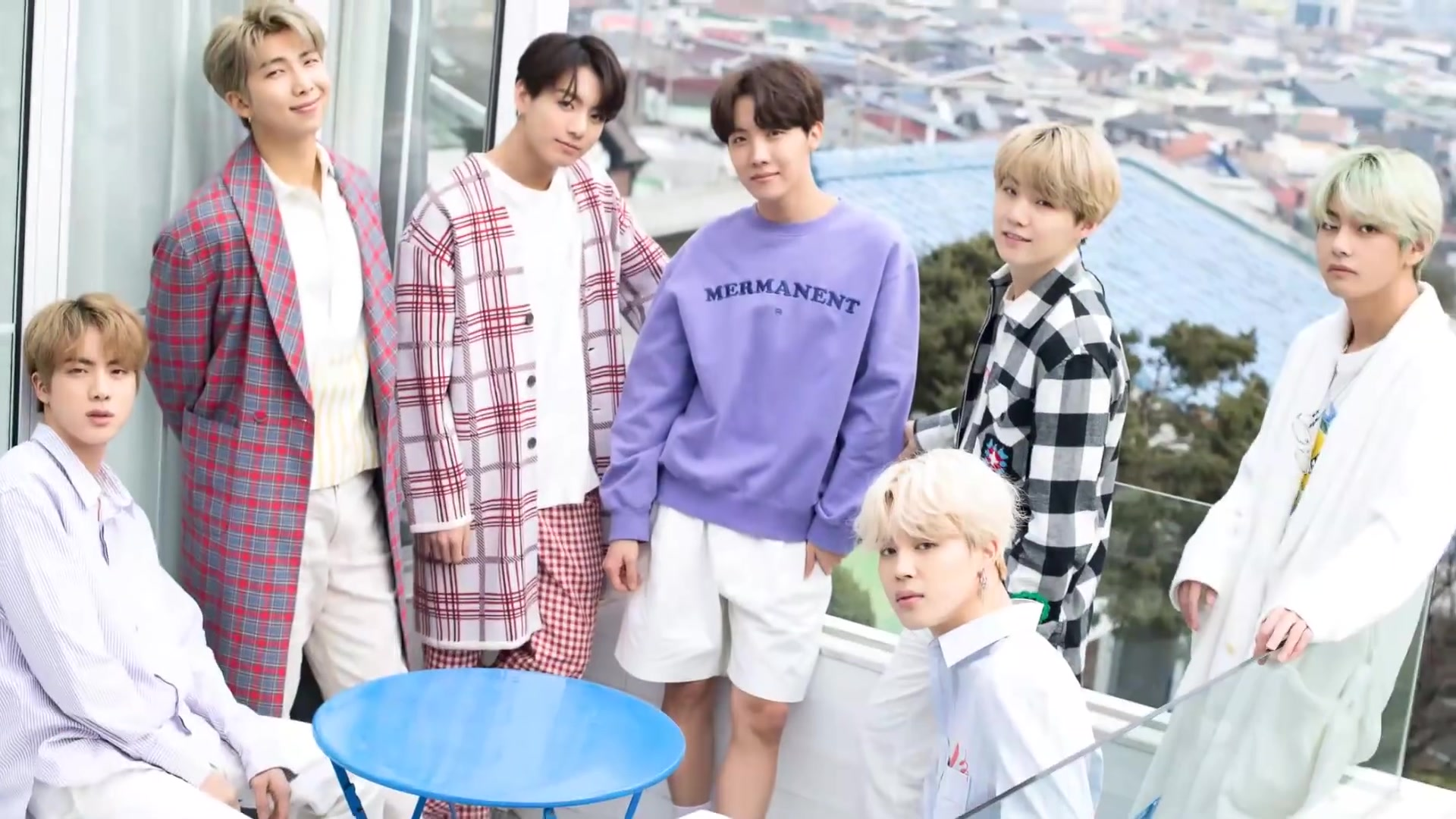
BTS won four awards, including the Disc Daesang (Album of the Year), Digital Song Bonsang, Album Bonsang, and Seezn Most Popular Artist Award.

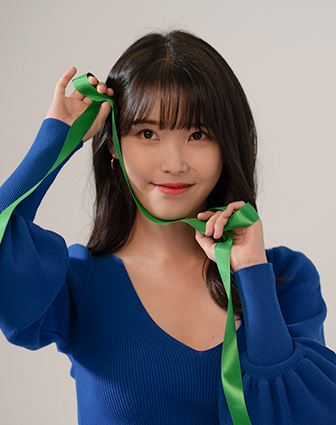
IU won three awards, including the Digital Daesang (Song of the Year), Digital Song Bonsang, and Album Bonsang.

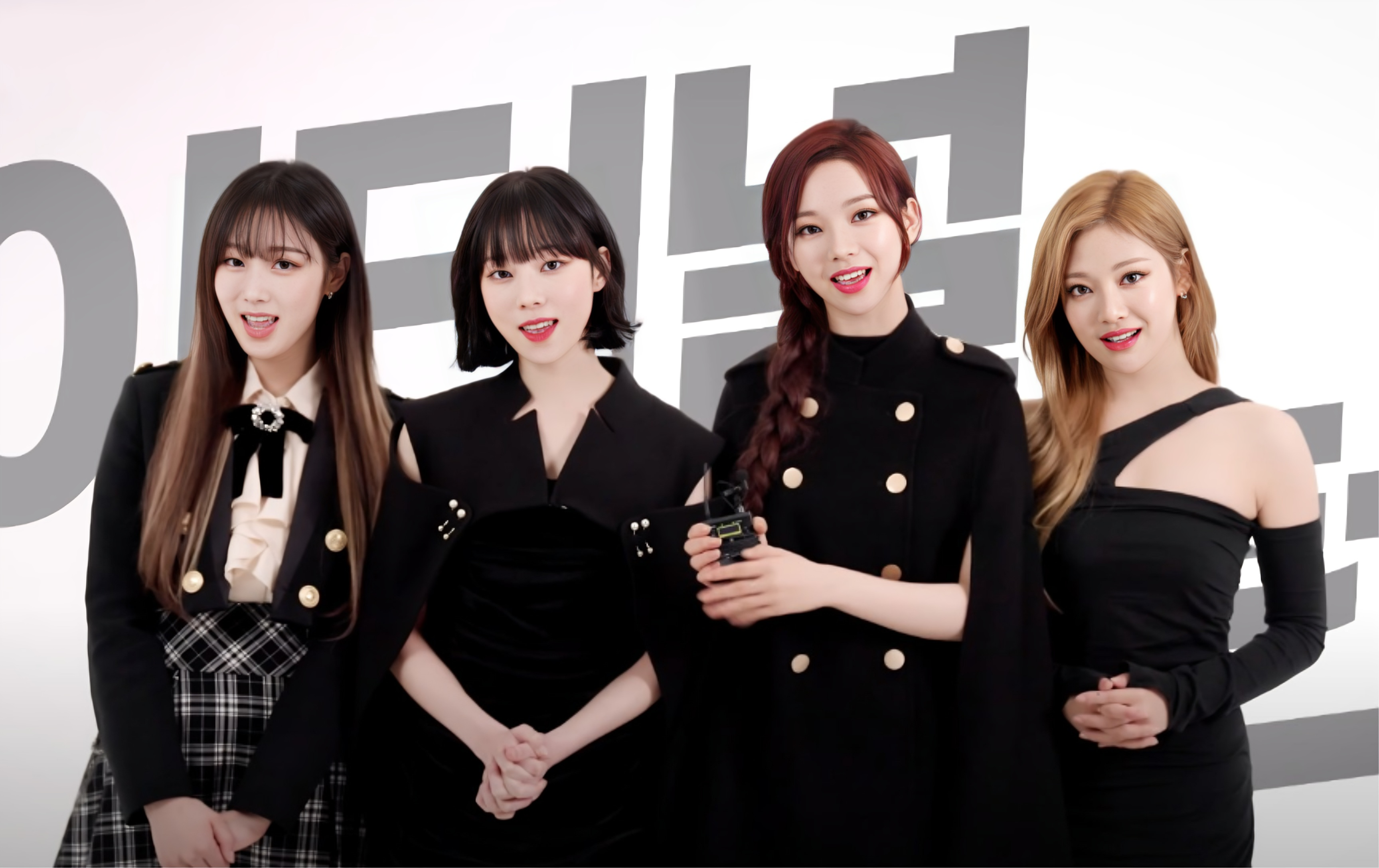
Aespa won four awards, including the Artist of the Year, Digital Song Bonsang, Rookie Artist of the Year, and Cosmopolitan Artist Award.

Winners and nominees are listed in alphabetical order. Winners are listed first and emphasized in bold.

=== Main awards ===
The list of nominees for:

- Seezn Most Popular Artist Award were announced on December 20, 2021, through Seezn website.
- remaining categories except Digital Daesang (Song of the Year) and Disc Daesang (Album of the Year) were announced on December 8, 2021, through the official website.
- Digital Daesang (Song of the Year) and Disc Daesang (Album of the Year) were chosen from the winners of Digital Song Daesang and Album Bonsang.

The voting for Seezn Most Popular Artist Award opened on Seezn website on December 20, 2021, and closed on December 31, 2021.

| Digital Daesang (Song of the Year) | Disc Daesang (Album of the Year) |
|---|---|
| **IU – "Celebrity"**; Aespa – "Next Level"; AKMU – "Nakka" (with IU); BTS – "Butter"; Heize – "Happen"; Lee Mu-jin – "Traffic Light"; Oh My Girl – "Dun Dun Dance"; STAYC – "ASAP" | **BTS – Be**; Enhypen – Dimension: Dilemma; IU – Lilac; NCT 127 – Sticker; NCT Dream – Hot Sauce; Seventeen – Attacca; Stray Kids – Noeasy; Tomorrow X Together – The Chaos Chapter: Freeze |
| Digital Song Bonsang | Album Bonsang |
| **Aespa – "Next Level"**; **AKMU – "Nakka" (with IU)**; **BTS – "Butter"**; **Heize – "Happen"**; **IU – "Celebrity"**; **Lee Mu-jin – "Traffic Light"**; **Oh My Girl – "Dun Dun Dance"**; **STAYC – "ASAP"**; (G)I-dle – "Hwaa"; Ash Island – "Melody"; Ben – "Lonely Night"; Big Mama – "One Day More"; Brave Girls – "Chi Mat Ba Ram"; Davichi – "Just hug me"; GyeongseoYeji & Jeon Keon-ho – "If you lovingly call my name"; Huh Gak – "How did we"; Hyuna – "I'm Not Cool"; Itzy – "In the Morning"; Jeon Somi – "Dumb Dumb"; Joy – "Hello"; Jung Dong-ha – "I Still Love You"; Lee Ye-joon – "On That Day"; Lim Young-woong – "My Starry Love"; Red Velvet – "Queendom"; Rosé – "On The Ground"; Shinee – "Don't Call Me"; Sojung – "If You Were Still Here"; Song I-han – "I Will Be Your Shining Star"; Taeyeon – "Weekend"; Twice – "Alcohol-Free" | **BTS – Be**; **Enhypen – Dimension: Dilemma**; **IU – Lilac**; **NCT 127 – Sticker**; **NCT Dream – Hot Sauce**; **Seventeen – Attacca**; **Stray Kids – Noeasy**; **Tomorrow X Together – The Chaos Chapter: Freeze**; (G)I-dle – I Burn; 2PM – Must; Aespa – Savage; Astro – All Yours; Ateez – Zero: Fever Part.3; Cravity – Season 3. Hideout: Be Our Voice; D.O. – Empathy; Golden Child – Game Changer; Got7 – Breath of Love: Last Piece; Kim Ho-joong – The Classic Album I – My Favorite Arias; Itzy – Crazy in Love; Loona – [&]; Monsta X – One of a Kind; NCT – NCT 2020 Resonance Pt. 2; NU'EST – Romanticize; Oneus – Blood Moon; Red Velvet – Queendom; Shinee – Don't Call Me; Super Junior – The Renaissance; The Boyz – Thrill-ing; Twice – Taste of Love; U-Know Yunho – Noir |
| Rookie Artist of the Year | Seezn Most Popular Artist Award |
| **Aespa**; **STAYC**; Epex; Jo Yu-ri; Kwon Eun-bi; Lee Chan-won; Mirae; Omega X; Purple Kiss | **BTS**; (G)I-dle; 2PM; Aespa; AKMU; Ash Island; Astro; Ateez; Ben; Big Mama; Brave Girls; Cravity; Davichi; D.O.; Epex; Enhypen; Golden Child; Got7; GyeongseoYeji & Jeon Keon-ho; Itzy; IU; Heize; Huh Gak; Hyuna; Jeon Somi; Joy; Jo Yu-ri; Jung Dong-ha; Kim Ho-joong; Kwon Eun-bi; Lee Chan-won; Lee Mu-jin; Lee Ye-joon; Lim Young-woong; Loona; Mirae; Monsta X; NCT; NCT 127; NCT Dream; NU'EST; Oh My Girl; Omega X; Oneus; Purple Kiss; Red Velvet; Rosé; Seventeen; Shinee; Sojung; Song I-han; STAYC; Stray Kids; Super Junior; Taeyeon; The Boyz; Tomorrow X Together; Twice; Yunho |

=== Other awards ===
Artist of the Year
**Aespa**
| Best Group | Best Performance |
| **Brave Girls** | **Jeon Somi**; **The Boyz** |
| Best Solo Artist | Cosmopolitan Artist Award |
| **Lim Young-woong** | **Aespa**; **Seventeen** |

=== Multiple awards ===
The following artist(s) received three or more awards:

| Awards | Artist(s) |
|---|---|
| 4 | Aespa |
| 4 | BTS |
| 3 | IU |

== Presenters ==
The list of presenters was announced on January 3, 2022.

Order of the presentation, name of the artist(s), and award(s) they presented
| Order | Artist(s) | Presented |
|---|---|---|
| 1 | Woo Do-hwan | Rookie Artist of the Year |
| 2 | Lee Si-eon | Best Group |
| 3 | Jeon Jong-seo | Digital Song Bonsang |
| 4 | Han Sun-hwa | Best Performance |
| 5 | Ahn Bo-hyun | Best Solo Artist + Cosmopolitan Artist Award |
| 6 | Shin Hyun-been | Album Bonsang |
| 7 | Ahn Hyo-seop | Digital Song Bonsang |
| 8 | Lee Do-hyun | Album Bonsang |
| 9 | Jeon So-min | Digital Song Bonsang |
| 10 | Koo Kyo-hwan | Seezn Most Popular Artist Award |
| 11 | Han Chae-young | Album Bonsang |
| 12 | Park Hee-soon | Album Bonsang |
| 13 | Oh Jung-se | Digital Song Bonsang |
| 14 | Jin So-yeon | Artist of the Year |
| 15 | Ju Ji-hoon | Disc Daesang (Album of the Year) |
| 16 | Jung Woo-sung and JTBC's President Hong Jeong-do | Digital Daesang (Song of the Year) |

== Performers ==
The first lineup was announced on December 28, 2021. The second lineup was announced on December 30, 2021.

Order of the performance, name of the artist(s), and song(s) they performed
| Order | Artist(s) | Song performed | Ref. |
|---|---|---|---|
| 1 | Kardi | Cover of "Celebrity" + "Next Level" + "Butter" + "Dun Dun Dance" + "Rock with You" + "Thunderous" | |
| 2 | STAYC | "So Bad" (Tak Remix) + "ASAP" | |
| 3 | Brave Girls | "Rollin'" + "Chi Mat Ba Ram" | |
| 4 | Lee Mu-jin | "The Assignment Song" + "Traffic Light" | |
| 5 | Jeon Somi | "XOXO" + "Dumb Dumb" (Remix version) | |
| 6 | The Boyz | "Thrill Ride" (8 bit version) + "Hypnotized" | |
| 7 | Lee Mu-jin (featuring Heize) | "When It Snows" | |
| 8 | Lim Young-woong | "Love Always Run Away" + "My Starry Love" | |
| 9 | Enhypen | "Drunk-Dazed" + "Tamed-Dashed" (Rock version) | |
| 10 | Tomorrow X Together | "No Rules" + "Anti-Romantic" + "0x1=Lovesong (I Know I Love You)" | |
| 11 | Oh My Girl | "Quest" + "Dun Dun Dance" | |
| 12 | Tomorrow X Together | "It Boy, The Rockstar" (Golden Stage) | |
| 13 | Heize | "Happen" + "On Rainy Day" (2021) | |
| 14 | Aespa | "Black Mamba" (Intro) + "Next Level" + "Savage" | |
| 15 | Stray Kids | "Thunderous" + "Top" + "Wolfgang" | |
| 16 | Big Mama | Cover of "Butter" + "Lilac" + "Dun Dun Dance" + "0x1=Lovesong (I Know I Love You)" + "Traffic Light" | |
| 16 | Big Mama | "Break Away" + "One Day More" + "Refusal" + "Never Mind" | |
| 17 | Seventeen | "Not Alone" + "Imperfect Love" + "Gam3 Bo1" + "Pang!" + "Rock with you" | |
| 18 | IU | "Celebrity" + "Lilac" | |
| 19 | BTS (Note: BTS did not attend the ceremony due to their temporary hiatus, but revealed exclusive footage from their Los Angeles concert for the first time on television.) | "Life Goes On" + "Butter" | |

== Broadcast ==
| Region | Network/Platform | Ref. |
|---|---|---|
| Brunei | Astro Go | |
| Indonesia | Vidio | |
| Japan | TBS | |
| Malaysia | Astro Go | |
| Singapore | meWatch | |
| South Korea | JTBC; JTBC2; JTBC4; Seezn | |
| Vietnam | FPT Play | |
