= List of Music Bank Chart winners (2021) =

Music Bank Chart winners (2021)

Highlights
- Song with most wins: "Dynamite" by BTS & "Celebrity" by IU (4)
- Artist(s) with most wins: BTS (8)
- Song with highest score: "Permission to Dance" by BTS (11,145)

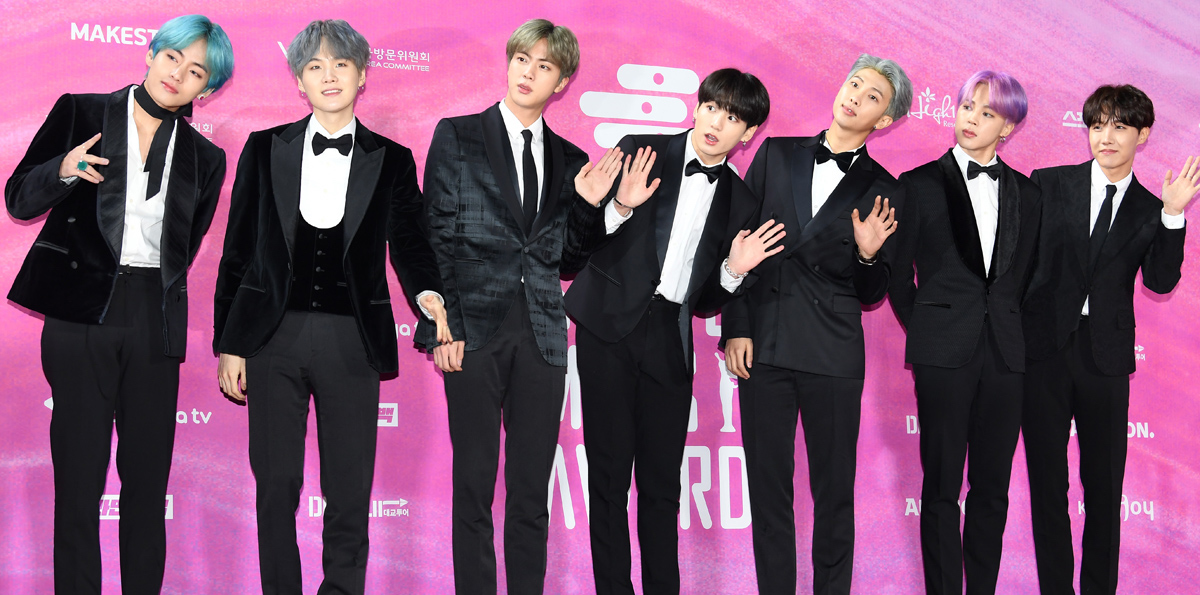
"Dynamite" by BTS (pictured) won its 32nd overall music show award on the March 5th broadcast, and became the song with the most music show wins of all time in South Korea. Their win for succeeding single "Permission to Dance" had the highest score of 2021, with 11,145 points on the July 23rd broadcast.

The Music Bank Chart is a record chart established in 1998 on the South Korean KBS television music program Music Bank. Every week during its live broadcast, the show gives an award for the best-performing single on the South Korean chart. The chart includes digital performances on domestic online music services (65%), album sales (5%), number of times the single was broadcast on KBS TV (20%), and viewers' choice from online surveys (10%), a methodology that has been used since November 2020. The score for domestic online music services is calculated using data from Melon, Bugs, Genie Music, Naver Vibe and Flo. Oh My Girl member Arin and Tomorrow X Together member Choi Soo-bin had hosted the show since July 2020 and continued to do so until October 1, 2021. Enhypen member Park Sung-hoon and Ive member Jang Won-young were announced as new hosts the following week.

In 2021, 40 singles reached number one on the chart, and 30 acts were awarded first-place trophies. The year began with "Dynamite" by BTS at number one; it had been in the top spot on the last chart of 2020. The single, along with "Celebrity" by IU, won four trophies each, making both singles the most-awarded songs of the year. "Permission to Dance" by BTS had the highest score of the year, with 11,145 points on the July 23 broadcast. BTS had three number one singles on the chart in 2021 achieved with "Dynamite", "Butter" and "Permission to Dance", the most of any act in 2021. The three songs spent a total of eight weeks atop the chart, making BTS the act with the most wins of the year. Brave Girls won their first Music Bank award for "Rollin'" over four years after its release after a YouTube video featuring performances of the song went viral, making it rise on South Korean music charts.

Blackpink member Rosé received her first number one trophy on Music Bank for her debut single "On the Ground" on the March 26 broadcast. Fellow member Lisa achieved her first ever trophy as a soloist for her debut single "Lalisa". The single broke two Guinness World Records for the most viewed YouTube music video by a solo artist in 24 hours and most viewed YouTube music video in 24 hours by a solo K-pop artist, the latter of which was previously held by Rosé. Lisa was one of a number of soloists who achieved their first career music show wins in 2021, along with Exo member D.O., whose debut single "Rose" spent one week at number one in August, and TVXQ member U-Know Yunho, who gained his first number one as a soloist when "Thank U" debuted at number one on the January 29 chart.

== Chart history ==
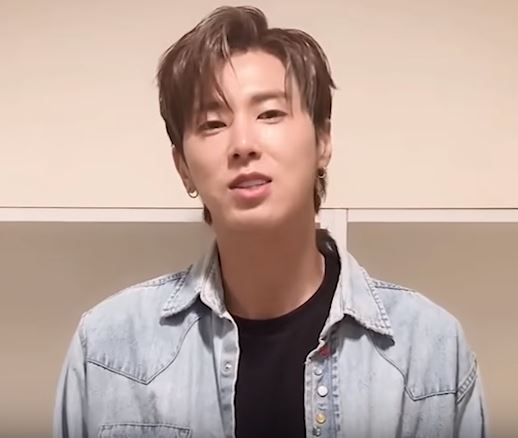
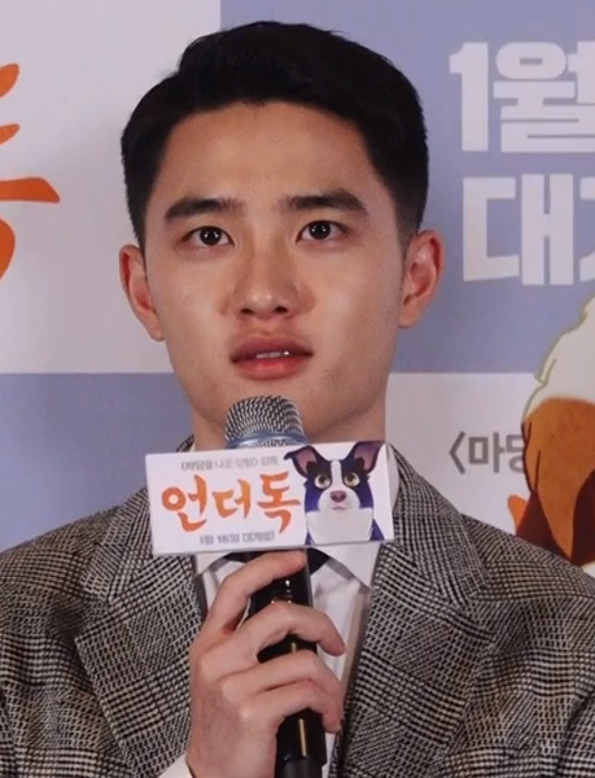
U-Know Yunho of TVXQ (left) and D.O. of Exo (right) received their first music show wins as soloists with "Thank U" and "Rose", respectively, on Music Bank.

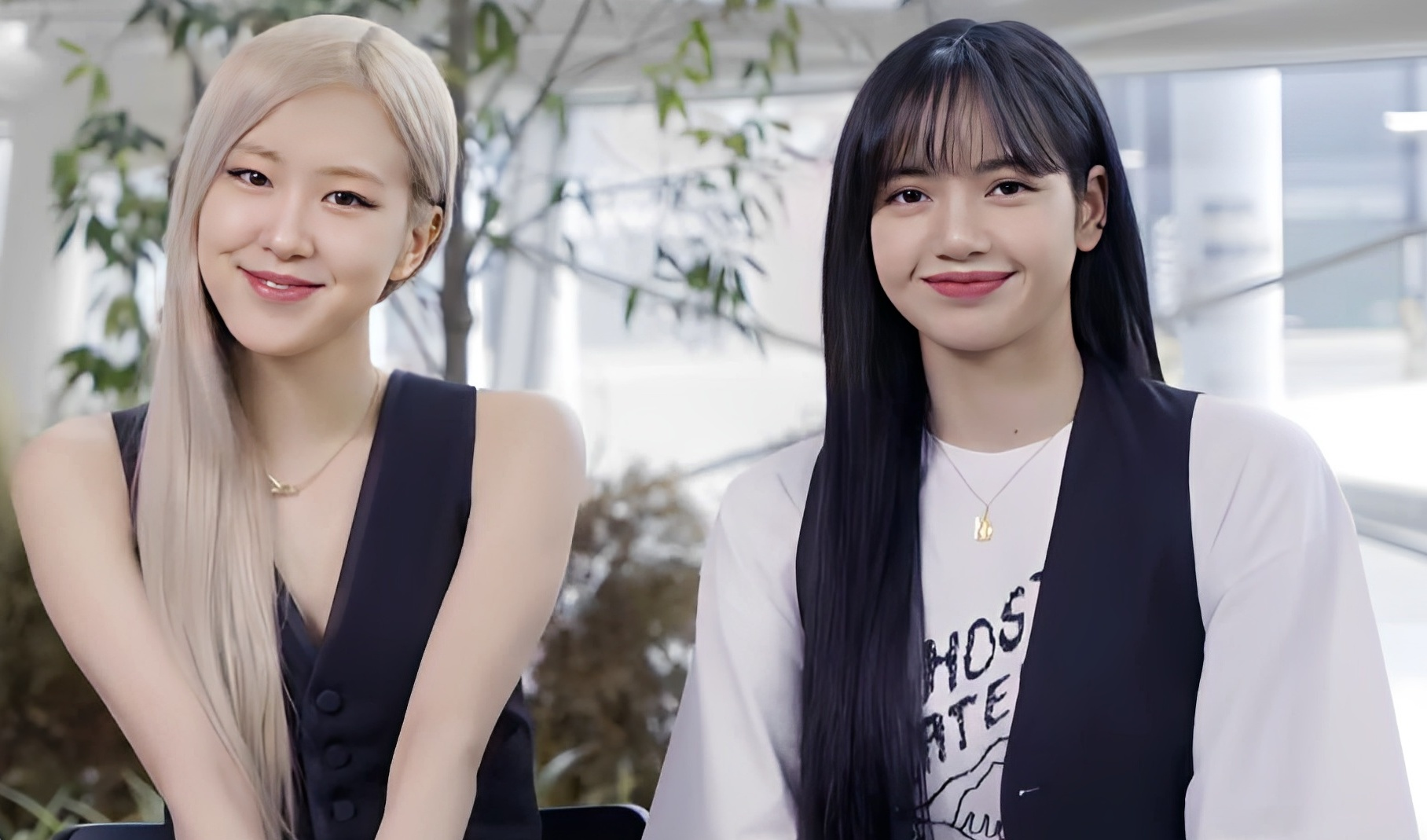
On Music Bank, Blackpink's Rosé (left) won her first broadcast music show award with "On the Ground", while fellow member Lisa (right) received her first music show win as a soloist for "Lalisa".

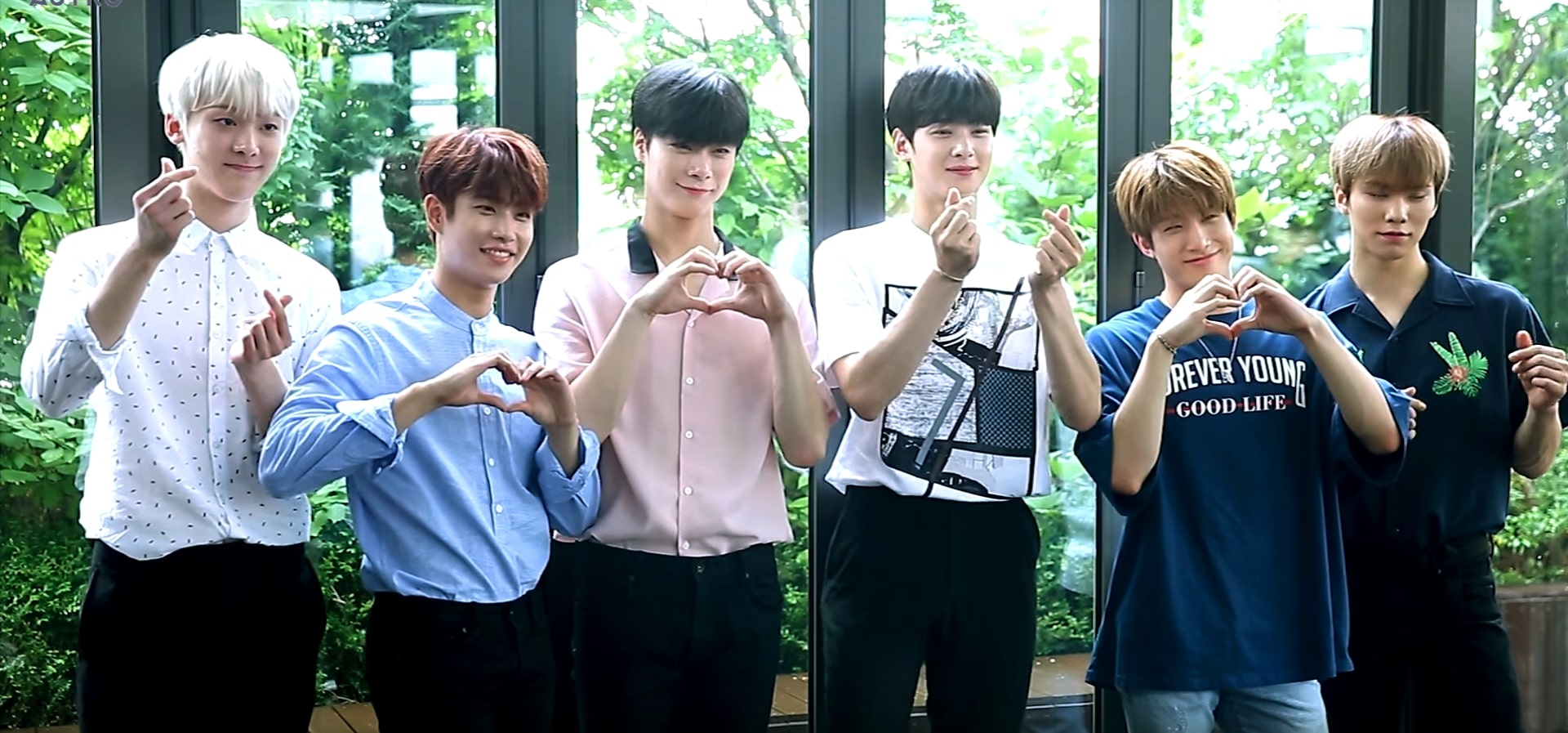
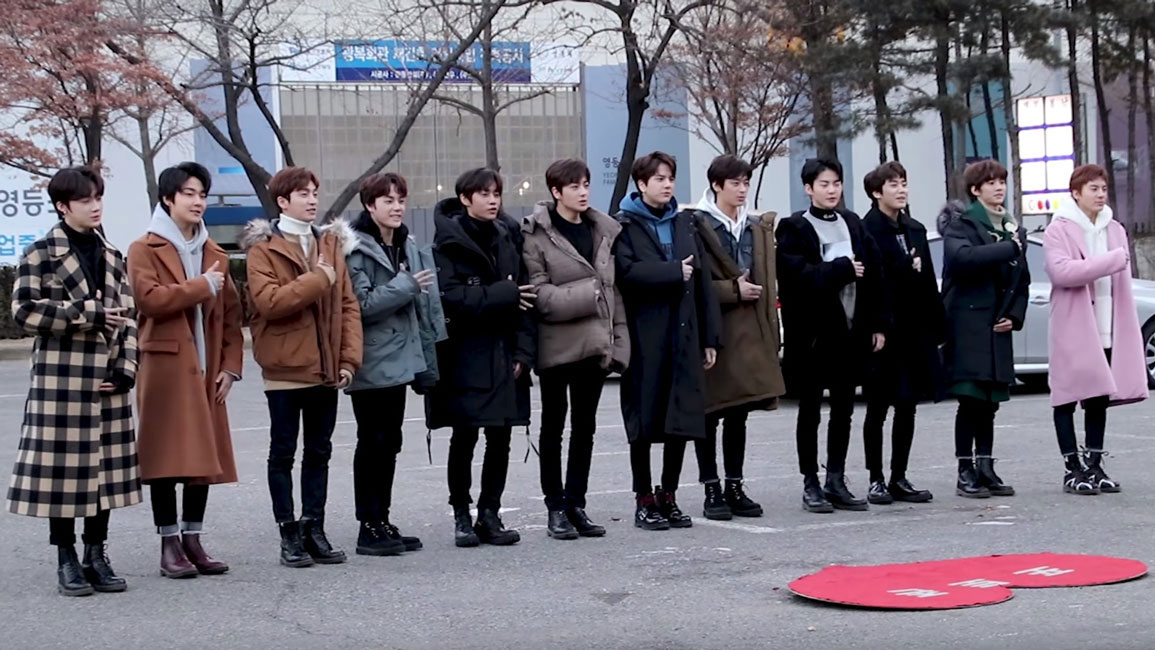
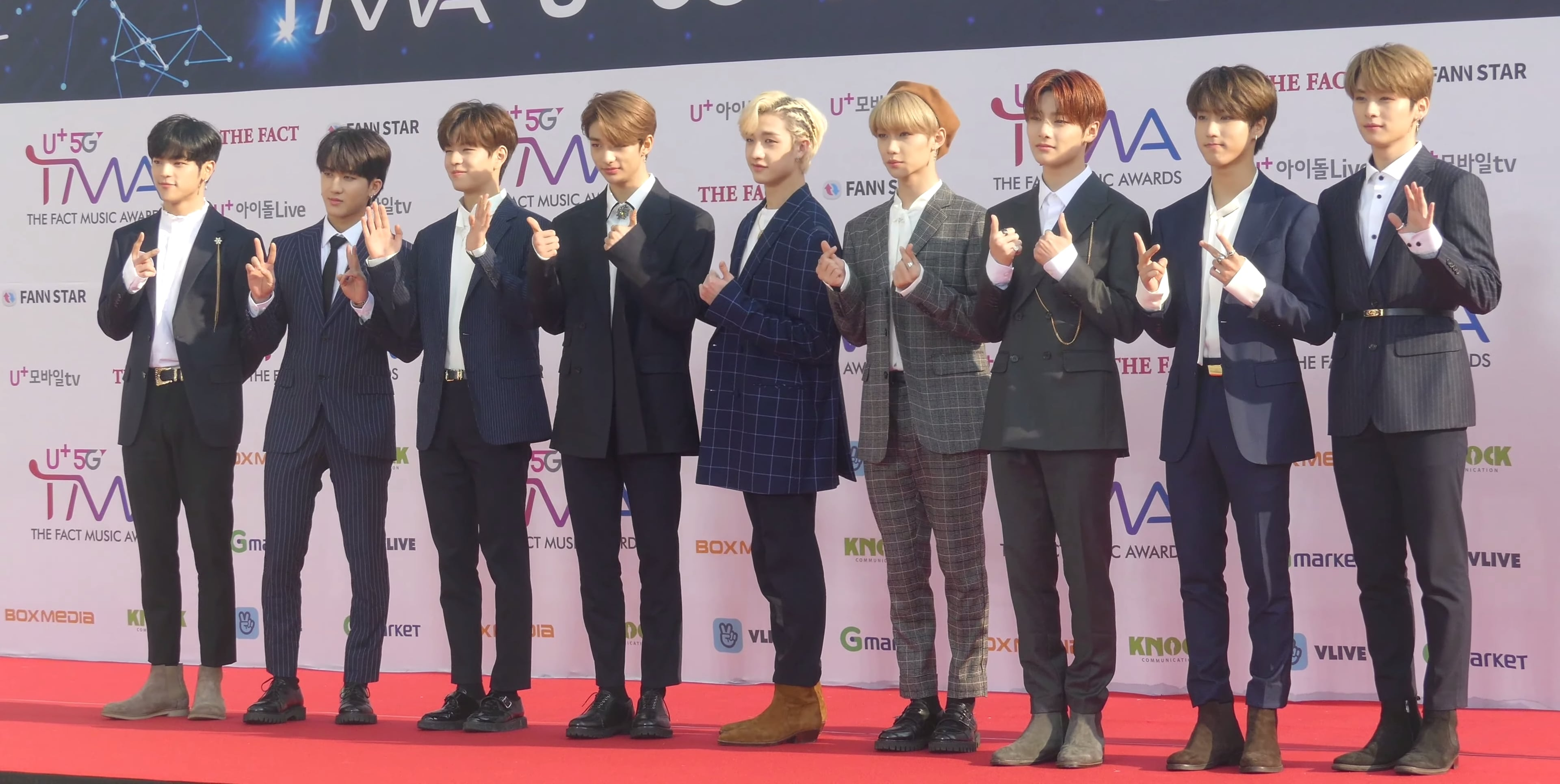
Astro (top), The Boyz (middle), and Stray Kids (bottom) won their first broadcast channel music show awards with their Music Bank wins for "After Midnight", "Thrill Ride", and "Thunderous" respectively.
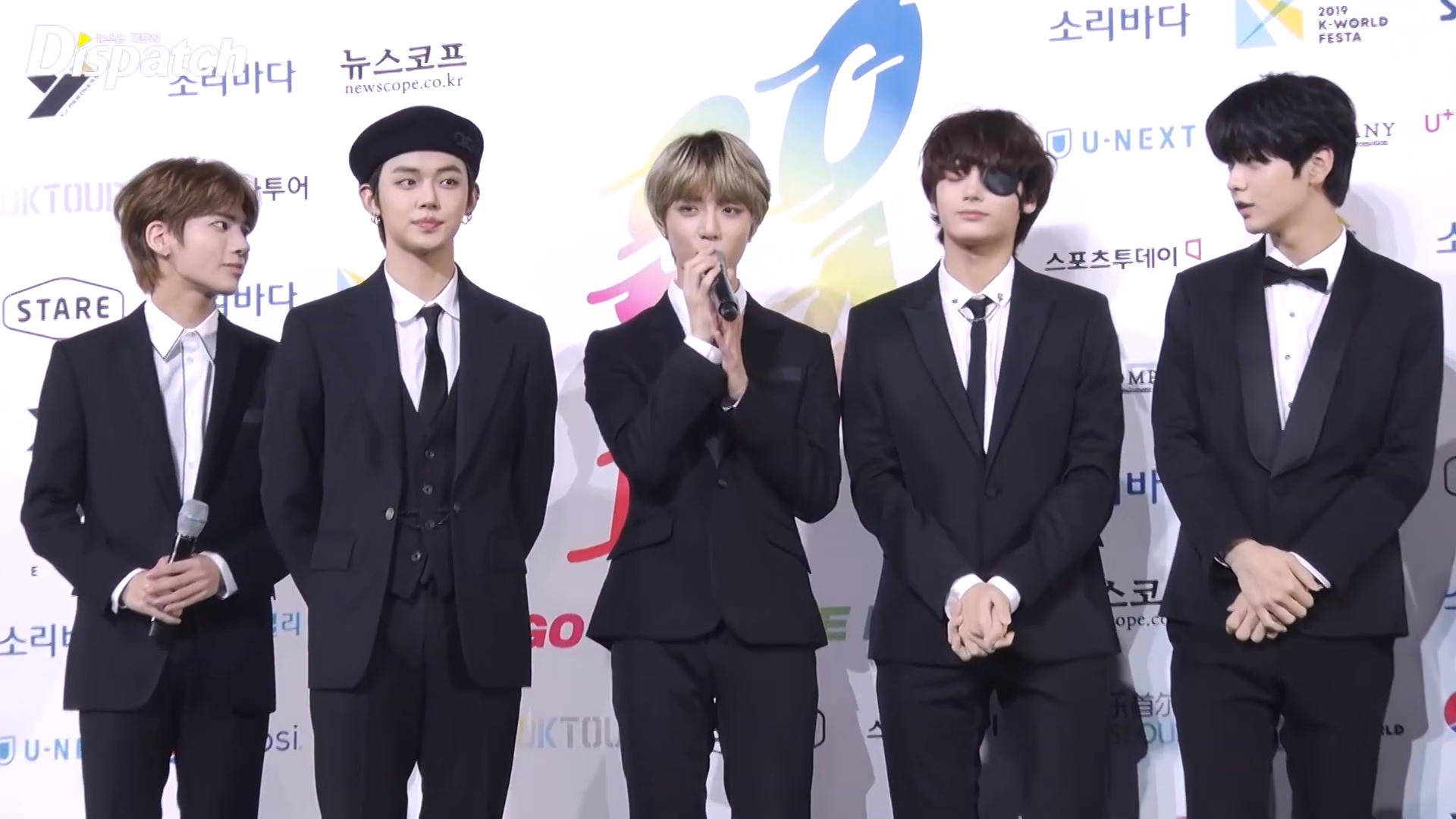
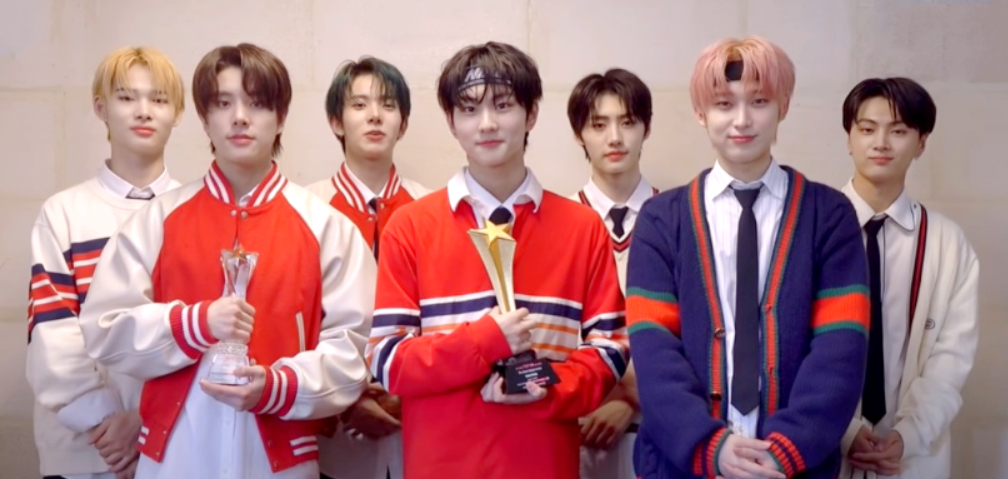
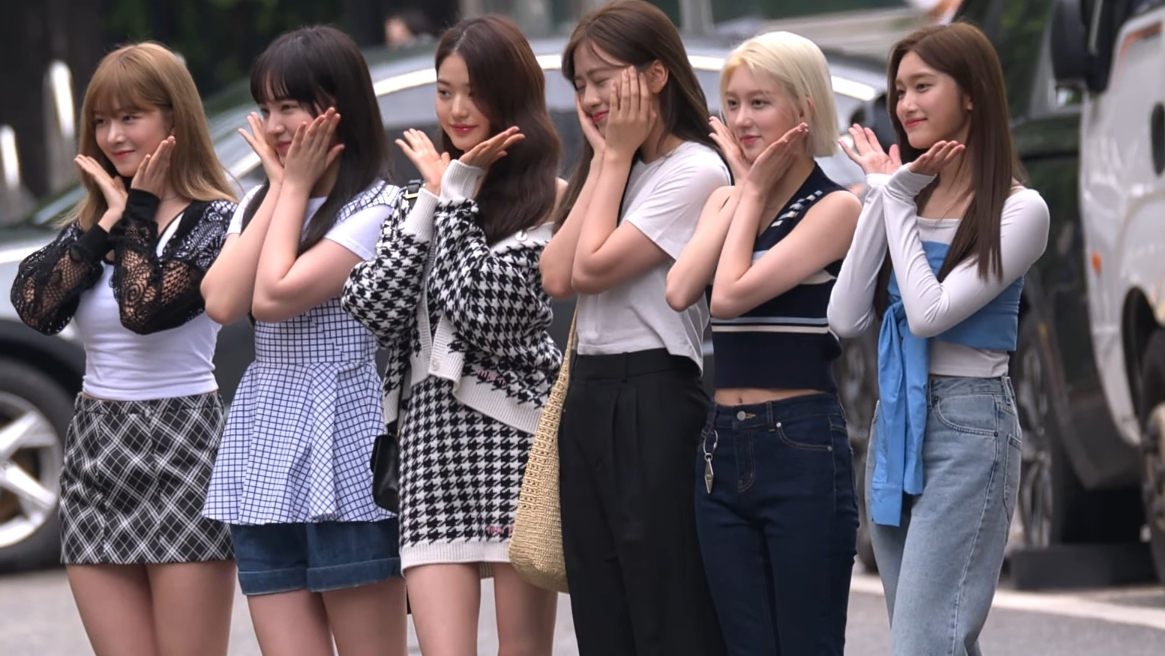
Tomorrow X Together (top), Enhypen (middle), and Ive (bottom) received their first broadcast music show wins on Music Bank for "0X1=Lovesong (I Know I Love You)", "Drunk-Dazed", and "Eleven", respectively. Tomorrow X Together member Soobin co-hosted the program until October 2021, with Enhypen member Sunghoon and Ive member Wonyoung becoming co-host later that month.

Key
‡	Highest score in 2021
—	No show was broadcast

Chart history
Episode	Date	Artist	Song	Points	Ref.
— (Note: This week's winners were announced on the station's official website.)	January 1	BTS	"Dynamite"	3,904	
1,057	January 8	BTS	"Dynamite"	4,447	
1,058	January 15	NCT U	"90's Love"	4,620	
1,059	January 22	(G)I-dle	"Hwaa"	5,846	
1,060	January 29	U-Know	"Thank U"	5,063	
1,061	February 5	IU	"Celebrity"	4,558	
—	February 12	IU	"Celebrity"	6,394	
1,062	February 19	Kim Woo-seok	"Sugar"	5,851	
1,063	February 26	BTS	"Dynamite"	9,812	
1,064	March 5	BTS	"Dynamite"	4,990	
1,065	March 12	IU	"Celebrity"	4,456	
1,066	March 19	Brave Girls	"Rollin'"	5,379	
1,067	March 26	Rosé	"On the Ground"	6,897	
1,068	April 2	IU	"Celebrity"	8,140	
1,069	April 9	Baekhyun	"Bambi"	8,009	
1,070	April 16	IU	"Lilac"	5,763	
1,071	April 23	Kang Daniel	"Antidote"	6,156	
1,072	April 30	NU'EST	"Inside Out"	5,446	
1,073	May 7	Enhypen	"Drunk-Dazed"	6,275	
1,074	May 14	Itzy	"In the Morning"	6,156	
— (Note: This week's episode was cancelled due to a staff member coming into a close contact with someone positive for COVID-19.)	May 21	NCT Dream	"Hot Sauce"	10,607	
1,075	May 28	NCT Dream	"Hot Sauce"	9,083	
1,076	June 4	BTS	"Butter"	6,326	
1,077	June 11	TXT	"0X1=Lovesong (I Know I Love You)"	6,970	
1,078	June 18	Exo	"Don't Fight the Feeling"	6,720	
1,079	June 25	Seventeen	"Ready to Love"	7,640	
1,080	July 2	Seventeen	"Ready to Love"	8,202	
1,081	July 9	NCT Dream	"Hello Future"	8,184	
1,082	July 16	BTS	"Butter"	11,051	
1,083	July 23	BTS	"Permission to Dance"	11,145 ‡	
—	July 30	BTS	"Permission to Dance"	10,437	
—	August 6	D.O.	"Rose"	6,546	
1,084	August 13	Astro	"After Midnight"	4,988	
1,085	August 20	The Boyz	"Thrill Ride"	7,810	
1,086	August 27	Red Velvet	"Queendom"	5,982	
1,087	September 3	Stray Kids	"Thunderous"	6,686	
1,088	September 10	Lee Mu-jin	"Traffic Light"	3,631	
1,089	September 17	Lisa	"Lalisa"	5,068	
1,090	September 24	NCT 127	"Sticker"	4,784	
1,091	October 1	NCT 127	"Sticker"	7,930	
1,092	October 8	Itzy	"Loco"	6,033	
1,093	October 15	Aespa	"Savage"	7,958	
1,094	October 22	Enhypen	"Tamed-Dashed"	8,967	
1,095	October 29	Seventeen	"Rock With You"	7,387	
1,096	November 5	Seventeen	"Rock With You"	9,084	
1,097	November 12	The Boyz	"Maverick"	5,302	
1,098	November 19	Twice	"Scientist"	4,133	
1,099	November 26	Monsta X	"Rush Hour"	4,057	
1,100	December 3	SF9	"Trauma"	4,971	
1,101	December 10	Stray Kids	"Christmas EveL"	4,620	
—	December 17	Ive	"Eleven"	4,445	
—	December 24	NCT U	"Universe (Let's Play Ball)"	7,584	
—	December 31	NCT U	"Universe (Let's Play Ball)"	6,611	

== See also ==
- List of Inkigayo Chart winners (2021)
- List of M Countdown Chart winners (2021)
- List of Show Champion Chart winners (2021)
- List of Show! Music Core Chart winners (2021)
- List of The Show Chart winners (2021)
