= Kloe (singer) =

Scottish singer and songwriter (born 1996)

- Born: Chloe Anne Latimer; 3 November 1996 (age 29); Glasgow, Scotland
- Occupations: Singer; songwriter
- Years active: 2013–present
- Musical career
- Genres: Alternative pop; dream pop; electropop; pop
- Instruments: Vocals; guitar
- Labels: Columbia; Iamsound; Warner Chappell

Chloe Anne Latimer (born 3 November 1996), known professionally as Kloe, is a Scottish singer and songwriter. Born in Glasgow, she made acoustic music as a teenager and later dropped out of high school to pursue a career in music. After signing record deals with Columbia Records and Iamsound, Kloe released her debut extended play Teenage Craze in 2016.

== Life and career ==
Chloe Anne Latimer was born on 3 November 1996 in Glasgow. Her parents are divorced. Aside from Glasgow, she has also lived in Clydebank, London, and Reading. In her early career, she made acoustic music and auditioned for The X Factor when she was 13, although she did not advance further. Kloe performed cover songs regularly on stage in front of her peers at school at 14. Around that time, she bought a MacBook and taught herself how to record and produce her own music using various programs. At 15, she started performing live and was a supporting act for fellow singer Nina Nesbitt in Glasgow.

Kloe dropped out of Clydebank High School to pursue a career in music at age 16. Before she decided to fully commit to music, she worked as a waitress. On 2 November 2013, she opened for English singer-songwriter Gabrielle Aplin at O2 ABC Glasgow. Despite not being old enough to attend most of King Tut's Wah Wah Hut's shows, Kloe headlined at the venue in January 2014. In the same year, she began collaborating with a producer who made electronic music. However, she ended up working with Lewis Gardiner of Prides and adopted the stage name Kloe. She told Glasgow Times that she switched from making acoustic music because she wanted to "outgrow the singer-songwriter acoustic thing" she had been doing and wanted to explore new sounds.

She released her first single, "Grip", in December 2014. "Grip" was played on Zane Lowe's BBC Radio 1 show and received rave reviews from music critics. In February 2015, she performed as Kloe for the first time at The Garage where she was a headliner. Kloe released "Feel" as her second single in April. She was spotlighted on BBC Music Introducing in May. On 23 May, she sang at BBC Radio 1's Big Weekend. At 18, Kloe signed a record deal with Columbia Records and later with Iamsound in November 2015. Her third single "Touch" also followed in November. She won the Big Apple award at the 2015 Scottish Music Awards.

On 3 February 2016, Kloe unveiled the single "Teenage Craze". Her debut extended play Teenage Craze was issued two days later by Sony Music. She was the opening act for Marina Diamandis's Neon Nature Tour at O2 Academy Glasgow on 16 February. Among others, she performed at Canadian Music Week in May 2016. Kloe released two more singles in 2016, "UDSM" and "Liability". Also in 2016, Kloe sang at music festivals Festival N°6, South by Southwest, and The Great Escape Festival.

In July 2018, Kloe signed a publishing deal with Warner Chappell Music. She declared that Warner Chappell "fe[lt] like the right place" to take her songwriting "to the next level". She co-wrote Taemin's 2020 single "Criminal", which reached number 25 on the Gaon Digital Chart. Kloe was a co-writer of IU's "Celebrity" (2021). The song topped the Gaon Digital Chart and was the best-selling song in South Korea in 2021. Scottish musician Pocket featured Kloe on the single "Evergreen" in May 2023 which was included on his extended play, Love Disc (2023).

== Artistry and personal life ==
Kloe stated that Aplin was the "first person" she admired, as Aplin influenced her in regards to performing live and learning how to play the guitar. She also named Alanis Morissette, Avril Lavigne, Joni Mitchell, Pink, Stevie Nicks, and Taylor Swift as her musical influences while growing up. Kloe's musical styles have been described by music critics as alternative pop, alternative R&B, dream pop, electropop, pop, and teen pop.

Michael Cragg of The Guardian described Kloe as "Glasgow's sassy dark-pop practitioner". Digital Spy's Lewis Corner and Amy Davidson wrote that her musical style is akin to a combination of Swift's "confessional pop" and The Weeknd's "more murky R&B". Time Out columnists James Manning, Tristan Parker, and Michael Curle compared Kloe to Lorde and commented that she is "turning out sparkling R&B tunes with majestic pop choruses". In a review of Teenage Craze, Pigeons and Planes's Adrienne Black noted that Kloe's voice shifts from "mesmerizing and tranquil" to "upbeat and energetic".

Kloe resides in London. She is a member of the LGBT community. In the 2014 Scottish independence referendum, she voted for Scotland to become an independent country. Among other musicians, Kloe signed Kate Nash's open letter towards Barack Obama in support of the Standing Rock Sioux members who protested the construction of the Dakota Access Pipeline in 2016.

== Discography ==
=== Extended plays ===
List of extended plays
| Title | EP details |
|---|---|
| Teenage Craze | Released: 5 February 2016; Label: Sony; Formats: Digital download, streaming |

=== As lead artist ===
List of singles as lead artist
| Title | Year | Album |
|---|---|---|
| "Grip" | 2014 | Teenage Craze |
| "Feel" | 2015 | Teenage Craze |
| "Touch" | 2015 | Teenage Craze |
| "Teenage Craze" | 2016 | Teenage Craze |
| "UDSM" | 2016 | Non-album singles |
| "Liability" | 2016 | Non-album singles |

=== As featured artist ===
List of singles as featured artist
| Title | Year | Album |
|---|---|---|
| "Evergreen" (Pocket featuring Kloe) | 2023 | Love Disc |

=== Songwriting credits ===
List of songs co-written for other artists
| Title | Year | Artist(s) | Album | Ref |
|---|---|---|---|---|
| "Gucci on My Body" | 2018 | Baby Ariel | Non-album single | |
| "Lead Me On" | 2019 | Louise | Heavy Love | |
| "Next to You" | 2019 | Becky G with Digital Farm Animals featuring Rvssian | Non-album single | |
| "Strawberry" | 2019 | Twice | Fancy You | |
| "Criminal" | 2020 | Taemin | Never Gonna Dance Again | |
| "Dolphin" | 2020 | Oh My Girl | Nonstop | |
| "Shadow" | 2020 | Twice | More & More | |
| "Celebrity" | 2021 | IU | Lilac | |
| "SOS" | 2021 | Twice | Taste of Love | |
| "Attention" | 2022 | Kep1er | Doublast | |
| "Crazy like You" | 2022 | Chungha featuring Bibi | Bare & Rare | |
| "Newtopia" | 2023 | Loossemble | Loossemble | |
