= KyoungSeo =

South Korean singer (born 1999)

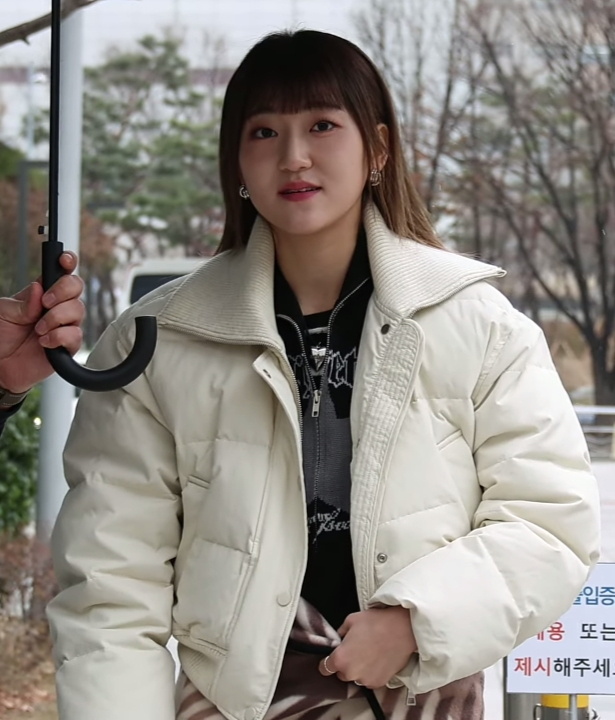
- KyoungSeo in December 2023

Background information
- Born: Lee Kyoung-seo; April 4, 1999 (age 27); South Korea
- Genres: K-pop
- Occupation: Singer
- Instruments: Vocal; guitar
- Years active: 2016–present
- Labels: R&D Company; Dream Engine

Korean name
- Hangul: 이경서
- RR: I Gyeongseo
- MR: I Kyŏngsŏ

Lee Kyoung-seo (Korean: 이경서; born April 4, 1999), known mononymously as KyoungSeo, is a South Korean singer. Her debut single "Shiny Star (2020)", which was a remake of the 2010 single of the same name by South Korean singer Yang Jung-seung, peaked at number one on South Korea's Circle Digital Chart.

== Discography ==
=== Extended plays ===
List of extended plays, showing selected details, and selected chart positions
Title	Details
Ongoing	Released: May 26, 2023; Label: Kakao Entertainment, Dream Engine; Formats: CD, digital download, streaming

=== Singles ===
List of selected singles, showing year released, selected chart positions, and name of the album
Title	Year	Peak chart positions		Certifications (Note: In April 2018, the Korea Music Content Association introduced music recording certifications for albums and singles; pre-2018 releases are ineligible for certification.)	Album
Title	Year	KOR	KOR Songs (Note: Includes the Billboard K-pop Hot 100 (defunct as of 2022), and South Korea Songs (part of Billboard's Hits of the World (2022 onwards)).)	Certifications	Album
As lead artist
"Shiny Star (2020)" (밤하늘의 별을 (2020))	2020	1	2	KMCA: 2× Platinum (Note: Certification for streaming)	Non-album singles
"My Everything" (넌 내꺼야)	2021	181	—	N/A	Non-album singles
"Maybe If" (꿈이라면)	2022	—	—	N/A	The M Pt.2
"Dear My X" (나의 X에게)	2022	7	4	KMCA: Platinum	Non-album singles
"Checklist" (고백연습)	2022	44	—	N/A	Non-album singles
"Flutter" (봄이야)	2023	120	—	N/A	Non-album singles
"120BPM" (첫 키스에 내 심장은 120BPM)	2023	50	—	N/A	Ongoing
"Anywhere" (어디든 가자) (featuring Huh)	2023	85	—	N/A	Non-album singles
"Looking for You" (내 마음이 너에게 닿기를)	2023	126	—	N/A	Non-album singles
"Christmas Time"	2023	— (Note: "Christmas Time" did not enter the Circle Digital Chart, but appeared at number 44 on the component Download Chart.)	—	N/A	Non-album singles
"Cocktail Love" (칵테일 사랑)	2024	112	—	N/A	Non-album singles
"Just Love Me" (사랑만 해두자 경서)	2025	154	—	N/A	Non-album singles
As featured artist
"Some Nights" (Heo Cha-en featuring KyoungSeo)	2020	—	—	N/A	Non-album singles
"Worries" (Lotian featuring KyoungSeo)	2020	—	—	N/A	Non-album singles
"I Say Ya! You Say Yeah!" (Yun DDanDDan featuring KyoungSeo))	2023	— (Note: "Christmas Time" did not enter the Circle Digital Chart, but appeared at number 60 on the component Download Chart.)	—	N/A	Non-album singles
"—" denotes a recording that did not chart or was not released in that territory

=== Soundtrack appearances ===
List of soundtrack appearances, showing year released, selected chart positions, and name of the album
Title	Year	Peak chart positions	Album
Title	Year	KOR DL	Album
"Wonder Why"	2023	20	The Interest of Love OST Part 7
"Dream About You" (너라는 꿈)	2023	81	Delivery Man OST Part 2
"Everyday With You"	2023	46	King the Land OST Part 9
"No Return" (거절은 거절할게)	2023	43	Trip: Playlist OST Part 1

== Filmography ==
=== Television shows ===
Year	Title	Role	Notes	Ref.
2016	Fantastic Duo Season 1	Contestant	Episode 15-16	
2019	Vocal Play Season 2	Contestant	Finished 2nd	
2021	Kick a Goal	Cast member		

== Awards and nominations ==
Name of the award ceremony, year presented, category, nominee of the award, and the result of the nomination
Award ceremony	Year	Category	Nominee(s) / Work(s)	Result	Ref.
Circle Chart Music Awards	2020	Artist of the Year – Digital Music (November)	"Shiny Star (2020)"	Nominated	
Circle Chart Music Awards	2023	Busan is Good Award	KyoungSeo	Won	
Golden Disc Awards	2023	Digital Song Bonsang	"Dear My X"	Nominated	
Golden Disc Awards	2023	TikTok Most Popular Artist Award	KyoungSeo	Nominated	
Korea Arts and Culture Awards	2024	Artist Award	KyoungSeo	Won	
Korea Culture Entertainment Awards	2022	K-pop Singer Award	KyoungSeo	Won	
Melon Music Awards	2021	Best Female Solo	KyoungSeo	Nominated	
Melon Music Awards	2021	Best New Artist	KyoungSeo	Nominated	
Melon Music Awards	2021	Song of the Year	"Shiny Star (2020)"	Nominated	
Melon Music Awards	2022	Best Female Solo	KyoungSeo	Nominated	
SBS Entertainment Awards	2022	Tiki-Taka of the Year Award	KyoungSeo	Won	
Seoul Music Awards	2023	Ballad Award	KyoungSeo	Nominated	
