= Lilac (IU album) =

- Digital cover

Studio album by IU
- Released: March 25, 2021
- Recorded: 2020–21
- Studios: Kakao Entertainment; Long Play Music; Prelude; The Village; Studio-T; Brickwall Sound
- Genres: City pop; retro-funk; indie pop; reggae
- Length: 36:32
- Language: Korean
- Label: Edam Entertainment
- Producer: IU

IU chronology
Love Poem (2019)	Lilac (2021)	Pieces (2021)

Singles from Lilac
- 1. "Celebrity" Released: January 27, 2021; 2. "Lilac" Released: March 25, 2021; 3. "Coin" Released: March 26, 2021

Lilac (Korean: 라일락, stylized in all caps) is the fifth studio album by South Korean singer-songwriter IU. It was released on March 25, 2021, through Edam Entertainment. The album was certified platinum by the Korean Music Content Association.

== Background and conception ==
On September 8, 2020, IU uploaded a video of herself as Lee Ji-dong, her Edam Entertainment employee alter-ego, on her official YouTube channel, revealing that she would be releasing a studio album by the end of the year. In an interview with GQ Korea in November 2020, she shared that the release had been scheduled for 2021. On January 11, 2021, her label Edam Entertainment announced that she would return with a pre-release single, a cheerful and energetic pop song titled "Celebrity", on January 27. On March 3, IU announced her fifth Korean-language studio album, titled Lilac, will be released on March 25.

Of the 10 tracks, IU served as the sole lyricist on eight tracks, two being co-written with Dean and Lee Chan-hyuk. Although the original plan was to include six songs written by her and six by other composers, she is only credited as co-composer on "Celebrity" and "Coin". While working on the album, IU revealed in an interview with W Korea that she did not feel the need to include a self-composed song, instead deciding to cut them as their calmer sound did not fit the tone of the rest of the record. She revealed that she wanted to make an album that was enjoyable and, at the same time, told stories, aiming to "put on a show that, above all, entertains." She compared Lilac to a blockbuster rather than an independent film, concluding, "I wanted to make my world, which has always been small and safe, bigger and wider, even if it was a little risky."

=== Concept and title ===
The concept of Lilac is "greeting/farewell" (인사; insa). According to Korean age reckoning, IU turned 29 in 2021; as a result, the album was the last of her twenties. IU explained her choice, stating, "Since I debuted at the age of 18 [sic], people have seen me from the middle of my teens, but they've seen me throughout my whole twenties. I'm making this album because I want to say goodbye to those who have been watching over my twenties, and thank you to those who watched until the very end. I want to have a glamorous goodbye. Something glamorous, without sadness. [...] I want to reach my thirties with a clean slate." In an interview with W Korea, she also shared: "In the language of flowers, 'lilac' means 'memories of youth.' I wanted to include a farewell with the message 'I'm now going onward to my next chapter' while also greeting my upcoming 30s at the same time."

The album closes IU's "twenties series", comprising the past releases Spring of a Twenty Year Old, "Twenty-Three", "Palette" and "Eight".

=== Songs ===
Lilac ranges from city pop, retro funk, and ballads, to indie pop and reggae. From "Lilac" to "Epilogue", IU expressed the end of her twenties as "a beautiful parting story."

"Lilac", which IU described as a bittersweet song reminiscent of a spring typhoon, recalls the disco sound from the 1970s and the 1980s, harmonizing the bass line with funk and pop elements. Speaking of a couple who joyfully parts at the beginning of spring after being together for ten years, IU says goodbye to her youth. In recording the song, she used the nasal sounds and vocalization techniques of "Good Day", "You & I", "The Red Shoes" and "Every End of the Day". "Lilac" also incorporates melodies and references lyrics from "Good Day", and a shortened version of its lyrics are referenced in the second verse, namely "How can the sky and the wind be more perfect than this?" (어쩜 이렇게 하늘은 더 바람은 또 완벽한 건지; Eojjeom ireoke haneureun deo barameun tto wanbyeokhan geonji).

In "Flu", IU compares the feeling of being in love to a flu, going so far as to rebel and engage in a desperate fight to get rid of the virus of love and the malaise it causes. In "Coin", based on the disco punk rhythms of the 70s and the 80s, she asks to let her play one last round of a challenging game that is harmful to her health. The song incorporates the sound effects of an electronic arcade. Along with "Ah Puh", it is one of the first times IU raps.

"Hi Spring Bye" mixes strings and electric guitar, recalling American pop ballads of the 80s, and tells of the farewell to spring. "Celebrity" was born for a friend labelled eccentric for her personality and clothes and then expanded to a message for all those who have felt a sense of alienation for not having met expectations. It is an electropop and tropical house song, and IU used synthesizers and autotune for the first time. "Troll" is based on reggae and bossa nova and tells of an on-again, off-again relationship. "Empty Cup" is lo-fi and R&B, telling of the moment in which one decides to give up the person by their side, nevertheless going on "unhappy, even resentful" because they are unable to end a relationship that has lasted so long.

"My Sea" was composed by Kim Je-hwi and Kim Hee-won, who composed the IU ballad "Through the Night". It is an orchestral piece that combines "Dear Name", "Love Poem", and "Secret". The song runs for five minutes and 16 seconds, a numerical representation of IU's birthday, May 16. The music starts calm and crescendos with the introduction of a 20-member string ensemble before reaching a dramatic climax. "My Sea" is about reconciling with her younger self and represents the culmination of the narrative, in which, according to IZM, "the echo that stretches out into the vast sea in a magnificent scale is intertwined with the voyage of the last 10 years, after which she finally falls in love with herself." IU compares her journey to the stormy sea, finding comfort in knowing her path that will always lead her back to her true self.

"Ah Puh" is a hip hop track that conveys confidence, loneliness, and exhaustion, giving a fresh vibe with the repetition of some consonants and vowels. The album is closed by "Epilogue", a song dedicated to fans, whose languid jazz arrangements and vintage sounds are reminiscent of IU's third album, Modern Times, and in which she sings with a "vague, moving and dreamy voice".

== Release and promotion ==
The release and title of Lilac was announced on March 4, 2021; a comeback timetable was shared on March 8. Previously, IU shared visual and audio snippets titled "Bylac" and "Hilac" on February 25 and March 1, respectively. IU unveiled the track list on her official SNS accounts on March 10, revealing K-R&B singer Dean as a featured artist, with AKMU's Lee Chan-hyuk, singer-songwriter Naul, and Penomeco taking part in production.

Lilac was released on March 25, 2021, through Edam Entertainment. The release marks the singer's first full-length album in nearly four years, following Palette (2017). IU appeared on South Korean music programs for the first time since promotions for Palette.

=== Singles ===
Lilac was preceded by the release of its lead single "Celebrity" and an accompanying music video on January 27, 2021. The single topped several South Korean music sites and debuted at number one on the Gaon Digital Chart. The single also entered the Billboard World Digital Song Sales chart in the United States at number three.

"Lilac" was simultaneously released alongside the album on March 25, 2021, as its second single and title track, also accompanied by a music video directed by Flipevil. The single debuted at number four on the Digital Chart with only four days of tracking. In the following week, the single peaked atop the chart. IU first performed the song, along with "Epilogue", on Music Bank, marking her first performance on a music show since "Palette". The following day, she returned to Show! Music Core and Inkigayo to perform "Lilac" and "Coin".

The third single, "Coin", was released the day after the album, on March 26, 2021. It was accompanied by a retro-inspired music video that was uploaded to 1TheK's official YouTube channel. The single debuted at number seven on the Digital Chart. The following week, the song rose to number four. IU performed the song, together with "Lilac", on Music Core and Inkigayo on March 26 and 28, respectively.

== Critical reception ==
Professional ratings
Review scores
Source	Rating
Beats Per Minute	81/100
IZM	4/5 stars
NME	4/5 stars
Rolling Stone Korea	4/5 stars

In evaluating Lilac, South Korean critics placed it in the broader perspective of IU's discography of the last decade, describing it as an album that incorporates "the many activities and various styles" she has challenged, the sounds of her twenties and the experiences of her own life, "unraveling the days that have passed so far from a variety of perspectives." Although critics Kim Hak-sun and Lee Dae-hwa regretted the lack of cohesion and freshness in the music, despite the album's high level of completeness, the choice to personally write the lyrics of all the songs served to "capture the organicity of the entire album", "eliminating the sense of imbalance". Shim Yoon-ji of the Kyunghyang Shinmun felt that the "exciting yet lonely, lyrical yet ambiguous" lyrics revealed IU's strengths, and that, by recounting her growth through music, she had developed a record "that comforts young people who live in the contemporary age," concluding that the album's greatest characteristic was that it was "so different that it cannot be summarized in a single word."

Hwang Sun-up of IZM called Lilac "a flower made of sounds" in which "the biggest change is the trendy sound transplantation based on multi-person collaboration, commonly used in idol groups." While observing that it might seem "a composition that can be a bit cluttered because it feels like it contains various things without much calculation," this is overcome "by the sense of unity and immersion that career-based storytelling gives," and concluded that "behind the seemingly glamorous work, the silhouette of Lee Ji-eun, a human being who overcame the confusion of the past and proved herself, bloomed more beautifully than anyone else."

Both Newsis and Rolling Stone Korea concluded there couldn't be a more perfect farewell.

Foreign critics focused more on the new musical direction, found by NME "bolder, louder and more fun," with which "IU steps out of her comfort zone to offer pure pop escapism," swapping "her subdued brand of sun-kissed pop for dancefloor hits." Chase McMullen of Beats Per Minute praised the choice of leaning on external collaborators, commenting that they had given a breath of fresh air and that most of Lilac's music sounded "weightless and playful," never straying too far "from what she knowingly calls 'the IU sound'," while drawing on the most disparate music and genres. He concluded that it is "an album of rumination, prideful bliss tempered by melancholy, and, above all, acceptance," in which IU "is both spectator and the spectated, the show is both pure performance and genuine, even fragile intimacy." Rolling Stone India spoke of it as a "grand celebration of all things summer and pop," in which "her artistry has only evolved and bloomed into something greater, more powerful and profound," and appreciated the choice to intervene on the album as a producer.

Instead, The Chicago Maroon praised IU's lyrical talent and found Lilac "an album about surveying the rubble of your twenties and picking at shards of memory, not just the glimmering fragments of your best past selves, but also the singed photographs of exes and old friends. It is about the queasy recollection of moments where you gambled and lost, and above all, the flat realization that you are here, now, looking back at the end of an era." While acknowledging the presence of more sunshine pop tracks such as "Troll" and "Celebrity," it felt they weren't enough to define the whole album "pure pop escapism" and "weightless and playful" as done by NME and Beats Per Minute.

Korean online magazine Idology named Lilac among the ten best albums of the year. NME included it on their list of the best Asian albums of 2021, while IZM and Rolling Stone India on their list of the best K-pop albums of the year. It was also featured among the memorable music releases of 2021 according to Allure Korea. "Lilac" was included in the lists of the best K-pop songs of 2021 compiled by Rolling Stone Korea, NME, Billboard and Teen Vogue. "Empty Cup" placed 42nd on the list of the 50 best songs of 2021 according to Beats Per Minute.

== Commercial performance ==
On its first day, according to the Hanteo chart, Lilac sold 216,319 copies, surpassing the opening day sales of its predecessor, Love Poem (2019). Lilac became the second highest-selling by a South Korean female soloist in its first week, having sold a cumulative 267,754 copies. It debuted atop the weekly Gaon Album Chart for the period dated March 21–27, 2021. On the Gaon Digital Chart, all ten tracks from the album simultaneously appeared in the top 30, with "Lilac" at number four. The song peaked at number one on the chart the following week. Additionally, several of IU's older songs re-entered the Digital Chart following the album's release. In May 2021, Lilac was certified platinum by the Korean Music Content Association (KMCA) for selling over 250,000 copies.

== Track listing ==
All lyrics are written by IU, except where noted.

Lilac track listing
No.	Title	Music	Arrangement	Length
1.	"Lilac" (라일락)	Im Soo-ho; Dr.JO; Ung Kim; N!ko	Im Soo-ho; Ung Kim; N!ko	3:34
2.	"Flu"	Ryan S. Jhun; Martin Coogan; Madilyn Bailey; Zachariah Palmer; London Jackson; Jacob Chatelain	Jacob Chatelain; London Jackson; Ryan S. Jhun	3:08
3.	"Coin"	IU; Poptime; Kako	Poptime	3:13
4.	"Hi Spring Bye" (봄 안녕 봄; Bom annyeong bom; lit. "Spring Hello Spring")	Naul	Kang Hwa-seong	5:24
5.	"Celebrity"	IU; Ryan S. Jhun; Jeppe London Bilsby; Lauritz Emil Christiansen; Chloe Latimer; Celine Svanbäck	Ryan S. Jhun; Jeppe London Bilsby; Lauritz Emil Christiansen	3:15
6.	"Troll" (돌림노래; Dollimnorae; lit. "Revolving Song"; featuring Dean; writers: IU, Dean)	Dean; Park Woo-sang; Junny	Park Woo-sang	3:09
7.	"Empty Cup" (빈 컵; Bin keop)	Woogie; Penomeco	Woogie	2:19
8.	"My Sea" (아이와 나의 바다; Aiwa naui bada; lit. "The Sea of a Kid & I")	Kim Je-hwi; Kim Hee-won	Kim Je-hwi; Kim Hee-won	5:16
9.	"Ah Puh" (어푸; Eopu; writers: IU, Lee Chan-hyuk)	Lee Chan-hyuk; Peejay	Peejay	3:20
10.	"Epilogue" (에필로그)	Shim Eun-ji; Sumin; Kim Soo-young; Im Geum-bi	Shim Eun-ji; Kim Soo-young	3:49
Total length:				36:35

== Personnel ==
Credits were adapted from the liner notes of the physical album.

- Madilyn Bailey – music (track 2)
- Jeppe London Bilsby – music (track 5), arrangement (track 5)
- Jacob Chatelain – music (track 2), arrangement (track 2)
- Lauritz Emil Christiansen – music (track 5), arrangement (track 5)
- Choi Hyung – mixing (track 4)
- Choi In-sung – bass (track 3)
- Choi Ja-yeon – assistance (track 8)
- Martin Coogan – music (track 2)
- Dean – lyrics (track 6), music (track 6), chorus (track 6)
- Dr.Jo – music (track 1)
- Jeff Gartenbaum – recording (track 4)
- Go Hyun-jung – mixing (track 9)
- Gu Jong-pil – mixing (tracks 2–3, 5)
- Hong Joon-ho – guitar (track 4)
- Hong So-jin – piano (track 3)
- Im Geum-bi – music (track 10)
- Im Soo-ho – music (track 1), arrangement (track 1), drum (track 1), guitar (track 1)
- IYP Orchestra – strings (track 4)
- IU – lyrics, music (tracks 3, 5), chorus (tracks 1–3, 5–10)
- London Jackson – music (track 2), arrangement (track 2)
- Jane – music (track 6)
- Je-hwi – music (track 8), arrangement (track 8), drum (track 8), synthetizer (track 8), chorus (track 8)
- Je-hwi's Friends – chorus (track 8)
- Ryan S. Jhun – music (tracks 2, 5), arrangement (tracks 2, 5)
- Jo Joon-sung – mixing (track 8)
- Jung Gi-woon – assistance (track 9)
- Jung Jae-pil – piano (track 8)
- Jung Suk-hoon – guitar (track 8)
- Jung Yoo-ra – assistance (tracks 2–3, 5)
- Junny – music (track 6)
- Kako – music (track 3)
- Kang Hwa-seong – arrangement (track 4), electric piano (track 4), keyboard (track 4)
- Kang Hyo-min – recording (track 8)
- Kang Sung-young – assistance (track 5)
- Kim Dong-min – guitar (track 3)
- Kim Hee-won – music (track 8), chorus (track 8)
- Kim Joon-sang – assistance (track 9)
- Kim Kap-soo – recording (track 4)
- Kim Seung-hyun – guitar (track 9)
- Kim Soo-young – music (track 10), arrangement (track 10), guitar (track 10), chorus (track 10)
- Kwon Na-moo – mastering
- Chloe Latimer – music (track 5)
- Lee Chang-sun – recording (track 4)
- Lee Chan-hyuk – lyrics (track 9), music (track 9)
- Lee Min-woo – assistance (track 9)
- Lee Na-il – strings arrangement (track 8), strings directing (track 8)
- N!ko – music (track 1), arrangement (track 1), electric piano (track 1), synthetizer (track 1)
- Naul – music (track 4), chorus (track 4)
- Oh Sung-geun – recording (track 8)
- On the String – strings (track 8)
- Zacchariah Palmer – music (track 2)
- Park In-young – strings arrangement (track 4), strings directing (track 4)
- Park Ji-yong – drum (track 3)
- Park Woo-sang – music (track 6), arrangement (track 6), keyboard (track 6), bass (track 6), synthetizer (track 6), mixing (track 6)
- Peejay – music (track 9), arrangement (track 9), drum (track 9), bass (track 9), keyboard (track 9), sound effects (track 9)
- Penomeco – music (track 7)
- Poptime – music (track 3), arrangement (track 3)
- Seo Dong-han – organ (track 8)
- Shim Eun-ji – music (track 10), arrangement (track 10), drum (track 10), bass (track 10), keyboard (track 10)
- Shin Jung-eun – drum (track 4)
- Son Myung-gap – recording, mixing (track 1)
- Stay Tuned – mixing (track 7)
- Sumin – music (track 10)
- Celin Svanbäck – music (track 5)
- Ung Kim – music (track 1), arrangement (track 1), bass (track 1), electric piano (track 1)
- Woogie – music (track 7), arrangement (track 7), drum (track 7), bass (track 7), piano (track 7), guitar (track 7), synthetizer (track 7), strings (track 7)
- Yang Kyung-ah – bass (track 8)
- Yoon Won-kwon – mixing (track 10)

== Charts ==
=== Weekly charts ===
Weekly chart performance for Lilac
Chart (2021)	Peak position
Japanese Albums (Oricon)	23
Japan Hot Albums (Billboard Japan)	63
South Korean Albums (Gaon)	1
US Heatseekers Albums (Billboard)	18
US World Albums (Billboard)	9

=== Year-end charts ===
Year-end chart performance for Lilac
Chart (2021)	Position
South Korean Albums (Gaon)	33

== Accolades ==
Awards and nominations
Award ceremony	Year	Category	Nominee	Result	Ref.
Gaon Chart Music Awards	2022	Song of the Year – March	"Coin"	Nominated	
Gaon Chart Music Awards	2022	Song of the Year – March	"Hi Spring Bye"	Nominated	
Golden Disc Awards	2022	Album Bonsang	Lilac	Won	
Korean Music Awards	2022	Album of the Year	Lilac	Nominated	
Korean Music Awards	2022	Best Pop Album	Lilac	Won	
Melon Music Awards	2021	Album of the Year	Lilac	Won	
Mnet Asian Music Awards	2021	Album of the Year	Lilac	Nominated	

== Certifications and sales ==
Certifications and sales for Lilac
Region	Certification	Certified units/sales
Japan	—	2,344
South Korea (KMCA)	Platinum	402,864

== Release history ==
Release history for Lilac
Region	Date	Format	Label	Ref.
Various	March 25, 2021	Digital download; streaming	Edam Entertainment	
