= Strawberry Moon (song) =

Single by IU
- Language: Korean
- Released: October 19, 2021
- Genre: K-pop; electropop; pop rock
- Length: 3:25
- Label: EDAM
- Songwriter: Lee Ji-eun
- Producers: Lee Ji-eun; Jonghoon Lee; Chae-gyu Lee

IU singles chronology
"Coin" (2021)	"Strawberry Moon" (2021)	"Winter Sleep" (2021)

Music video
- "Strawberry Moon" on YouTube

"Strawberry Moon" (stylized in all lowercase) is a song by South Korean singer-songwriter IU. It was released on October 19, 2021, through EDAM Entertainment via Kakao M. "Strawberry Moon" was both written and composed by IU, with additional composition credits by Jonghoon Lee and Lee Chae-gyu.

== Background and composition ==
IU's agency EDAM Entertainment unveiled the first teaser for "Strawberry Moon" on October 5, 2021, showing her in a dream-like setting sitting atop a giant ice cream scoop, with its release date set for October 19. She subsequently released a series of teasers, with a lyric teaser for its accompanying music video posted to YouTube on October 15. The song was made available for digital download and streaming at midnight local time four days later, and serves as a followup to her fifth studio-album Lilac, which was released seven months prior. The track was both written and composed by IU, with additional production credits by Jonghoon Lee and Lee Chae-gyu.

"Strawberry Moon"'s composition has been described as that reminiscent of a fairy tale, with its soft piano melody and IU's delicate voice. The lyrics of the song's chorus conveys the feelings of warm comfort in a romantic relationship, with its lyrics translating to: "Scoop of a large strawberry moon / I will entrust you to me eh-oh / The feeling of flying so cool / How is life more perfect ooh". Tamar Herman of South China Morning Post also described "Strawberry Moon" as a "breezy electropop-rock" track that talks about "a fated meeting" and equates it to a scoop of strawberry ice.

== Critical reception ==
Professional ratings
Review scores
Source	Rating
NME	4/5 stars
IZM	3.5/5 stars

Tanu I. Raj of NME said the song is a depiction of "the kind of easy, mature love that is unaffected by the whimsies of the heart or life" and praised IU's lyricism. She noted how the "lightness of being" becomes a "visual, sonic and lyrical theme" throughout the track and how the instrumental emphasizes the lyrics: while IU sings "feeling like floating up/Through the tense darkness/We won't be afraid" the piano "segues into atmospheric beats on the pre-chorus, as if with every word, she defies gravity and reaches a little higher", scene perfectly portrayed in the music video, where IU and her partner drive up in the sky. Tamar Herman of South China Morning Post said the track is "the perfect sonic representation of who she is and where she is in her career" and she included it on her list of Best K-pop releases of October 2021. Junhwan Jang of IZM said the song is "a triumph of lyrics" with "unique metaphors" and praised IU's lyricism, saying it "fully showed off in a song" since "Love Poem".

== Music video ==
The music video was posted to YouTube in conjunction with the release of the digital single. The visual was directed by Flipevil, who also worked with IU on the video for "Lilac" in March. Lee Jong-won appears as IU's opposite in the video.

== Accolades ==
"Strawberry Moon" achieved a triple crown on the music program Inkigayo, in addition to a quintuple crown on Show! Music Core.

Awards and nominations
Year	Organization	Category	Result	Ref.
2022	Genie Music Awards	Song of the Year	Nominated	
2022	11th Gaon Chart Music Awards	Song of the Year - October	Won	

Music program awards (8 total)
Program	Date	Ref.
Inkigayo	October 31, 2021	
Inkigayo	November 21, 2021	
Inkigayo	December 12, 2021	
Show! Music Core	October 30, 2021	
Show! Music Core	November 20, 2021	
Show! Music Core	November 27, 2021	
Show! Music Core	December 4, 2021	
Show! Music Core	December 11, 2021	

== Charts ==
=== Weekly charts ===
Weekly chart performance for "Strawberry Moon"
Chart (2021)	Peak position
Global Excl. U.S (Billboard)	123
Singapore (RIAS)	22
South Korea (Gaon)	1
South Korea (K-pop Hot 100)	1
US World Digital Songs (Billboard)	10

=== Monthly charts ===
Monthly chart performance for "Strawberry Moon"
Chart (2021)	Peak position
South Korea (Gaon)	1

=== Year-end charts ===
Year-end chart performance for "Strawberry Moon"
Chart (2021)	Position
South Korea (Gaon)	80
Chart (2022)	Position
South Korea (Circle)	30
Chart (2023)	Position
South Korea (Circle)	162

== Certifications ==
Certifications for "Strawberry Moon"
Region	Certification	Certified units/sales
Streaming
South Korea (KMCA)	Platinum	100,000,000^{†}
^{†} Streaming-only figures based on certification alone.

== Release history ==
Release dates and formats
Region	Date	Format	Label	Ref.
Various	October 19, 2021	Digital download; streaming	Kakao M	
