= Song I-han =

South Korean singer (born 1994)

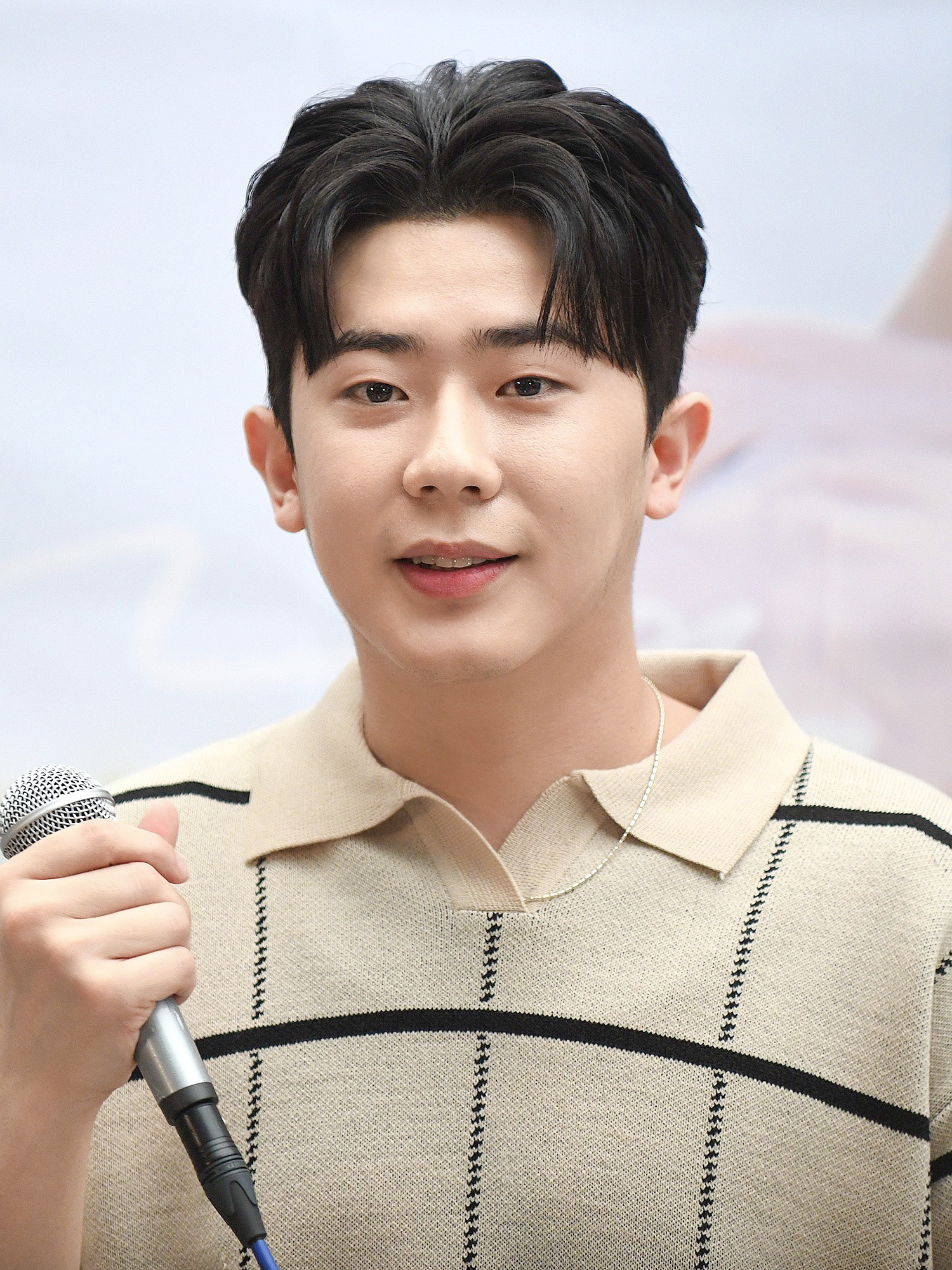
- Song busking in Hongdae, 2022

Background information
- Also known as: Hwigyeong-dong
- Born: Song Byeong-hwa; August 11, 1994 (age 31); Bucheon, South Korea
- Genres: R&B
- Occupations: Singer-songwriter
- Instruments: Vocals
- Years active: 2018–present
- Label: Music Design

Korean name
- Hangul: 송병화
- RR: Song Byeonghwa
- MR: Song Pyŏnghwa

Stage name
- Hangul: 송이한
- RR: Song Ihan
- MR: Song Ihan

Song Byeong-hwa (Korean: 송병화; born August 11, 1994), known professionally as Song I-han (송이한), is a South Korean singer-songwriter. He competed in the blind audition program Blind Musician in 2018 and won the competition, immediately releasing his debut single "Reason". At the end of 2020, he released a special single entitled "I Will Be Your Shining Star" amidst the global COVID-19 pandemic. The ballad rose in prominence and was nicknamed "wedding song icon" upon the launch of a contest in which three soon-to-be-married couples would be selected for a free performance by Song at their wedding. Song received two award nominations at the 36th Golden Disc Awards.

== Early life ==
Song I-han was born Song Byeong-hwa in Bucheon, South Korea, on August 11, 1994. In his youth, he focused on becoming an architect. He visited a noraebang to sing with his friends for the first time in high school, whom expressed surprise at his vocal abilities. Song began to study music in his first year to become a vocal trainer. He registered at an applied music hagwon's hobby class before taking the entrance exam for the professional department, which he failed. Song began his mandatory military service at age 20 and further developed his singing skills. Upon completing his duty, he worked various part-time jobs to invest in his music career. His father was ill between one and two years before dying in 2017.

== Career ==
In January 2018, entertainment company Music Design opened applications to the public for its blind audition talent competition Blind Musician. Song was tagged by his friend in the company's Facebook post about the contest, which he decided to enter. Participants entered as the name of their place of residence and were evaluated by a judge panel from the contender's voice only; Song used the name Hwigyeong-dong. From a pool 13,000 applicants, Song advanced to the final four and their final entries were uploaded on social networking services; he performed a cover of MC the Max's "Wind That Blows". A showcase was held at COEX Convention & Exhibition Center on June 3 where Song was revealed as the winner; he released his debut single "Reason" on the same day. Feeling that his birth name was old-fashioned, he adopted the moniker Song I-han for a more "refined and stylish" name. On March 25, 2019, his followup single "Means Goodbye" was released, where he contributed to the song's lyrics and composition. He also provided the track "You Don't Know" to the soundtrack of the web drama The Witch Store (2019). By the end of the year, Song signed an exclusive contract with Music Design.

Song issued his first mini-album Fade Away and its lead single "U Everyday" on March 25, 2020. In addition to penning all songs on the album, he was also involved in producing the record. He supplied the song "It's Not Okay" for the television series Brilliant Heritage two months later. On December 29, he released a special R&B single entitled "I Will Be Your Shining Star". In contrast to his previous breakup records, the track was a love song. He launched an event alongside its release in which three couples to wed amidst the ongoing COVID-19 pandemic would be selected to win a free congratulatory performance by Song. It resulted in the single's gradual rise on music charts and was dubbed a "wedding song icon". "I Will Be Your Shining Star" ultimately peaked at number nine of South Korea's weekly national Circle Digital Chart. On Circle Chart's year-end report for 2021, the single ranked at number 18 on its list of best-performing singles.

On December 12, 2021, Song released his second mini-album My Empty Space and its lead single "Memory of You". The following January, he appeared on the music competition series Immortal Songs: Singing the Legend with Lee Jung and they sang a cover of "One's Way Back" by Pak Sun-zoo. Song recorded a rendition of Ali's debut single "365 Days" from her 2009 debut EP After the Love Has Gone, which he released on February 7, 2022. On June 12, Song released the single "My Eyes on You". He contended in the singing competition program King of Mask Singer wearing a mask of street toast to conceal his identity. He competed against a female vocalist donning a twisted doughnut mask and lost 59–40.

== Musical style ==
Song identifies his "sweet" voice and high notes as his strengths. Writing for entertainment website Xportsnews, Kim Ye-na took note of his ability to bring listeners to tears through the sentiments expressed in his breakup ballads. His singing style has been compared to Yang Da-il, whose vocals he identified as an influence of his singing technique. Song cites Naul of Brown Eyed Seoul and Jung Key as his role models for singing and songwriting, respectively. He expressed his interest in learning the "emotions and depth" of Naul's singing. In terms of songwriting, Song incorporates the memories of his emotions into the lyrics, as opposed to what he feels at the time.

== Philanthropy ==
On New Year's Day in 2020, Song and ten of his fans visited the foster care facility Sunduk Home in Seoul, where they provided snacks, played with the children, and cleaned the premises.

== Discography ==
=== Albums ===
==== Extended plays ====
Title	Details
Fade Away	Released: March 25, 2020; Label: Music Design, Kakao; Format: CD, digital download
My Empty Space (나의 틈; Naui teum)	Released: December 12, 2021; Label: Music Design, Kakao; Format: CD, digital download

=== Singles ===
==== As lead artist ====
Title	Year	Peak chart positions	Certification	Album
Title	Year	KOR	Certification	Album
"Reason" (이유; Iyu)	2018	—		Blind Musician
"Means Goodbye" (안녕이라는 말; Annyeongiraneun mal)	2019	90		Non-album single
"U Everyday" (매일 너를; Maeil neoreul)	2020	—		Fade Away
"I Will Be Your Shining Star" (밝게 빛나는 별이 되어 비춰줄게; Balge binnaneun byeori doeeo bichwojulge)	2020	9	KMCA: Platinum (Note: Certification for streaming)	Non-album single
"Memory of You" (추억에 묻어둔 채 살아갈게; Chueoge mudeodun chae saragalge)	2021	—		My Empty Space
"365 Days" (365일; 365il)	2022	—		Non-album single
"My Eyes on You" (나의 두 눈은 그대를 바라보고; Naui du nuneun geudaereul barabogo)	2022	—		Non-album single
"My World to You" (내 세상을 주고 싶어; Nae sesangeul jugo sipeo)	2023	—		Non-album single
"After"	2023	—		Non-album single
"Who Am I To" (내가 뭐라고; Naega mworago)	2023	—		Non-album single
"My Heart Is Full of You" (내 마음은 너로 가득해서; Nae maeumeun neoro gadeukhaeseo)	2024	—		Non-album single

=== Guest appearances ===
Title	Year	Other performer(s)	Release
"One's Way Back" (귀로; Gwiro)	2022	J.Lee	Immortal Songs – Oh My Star Special II Part 1

=== Soundtrack appearances ===
Title	Year	Release
"You Don't Know" (그대는 모르죠; Geudaeneun moreujo)	2019	The Witch Store (Web Drama) OST – Part.2
"It's Not Okay" (괜찮지가 않아; Gwaenchanchiga ana)	2020	Brilliant Heritage OST Part.7
"Nothing" (아무 일도, 아무것도; Amu ildo, amugeotdo)	2022	Beautiful Moment OST
"All I Need Is You" (너만 있으면; Neoman isseumyeon) (with Yerin)	2023	The Witch Store Reopens OST Part 3

== Filmography ==
Online series
Year	Title	Note(s)	Ref.
2018	Blind Musician	Contestant, winner	

Television series
Year	Title	Note(s)	Ref.
2022	Immortal Songs: Singing the Legend	Contestant	
2022	King of Mask Singer	Contestant, episode 361	

== Awards and nominations ==
Year	Award	Category	Nominee(s)	Result	Ref.
2022	Golden Disc Awards	Digital Song Bonsang	"I Will Be Your Shining Star"	Nominated	
2022	Golden Disc Awards	Seezn Most Popular Artist Award	Song I-han	Nominated	
