= Celebrity (IU song) =

2021 single by IU

Single by IU

from the album Lilac
- Language: Korean
- Released: January 27, 2021
- Genre: Dance-pop; electropop; synth-pop; tropical house
- Length: 3:15
- Label: EDAM
- Composers: IU; Ryan S. Jhun; Jeppe London Bilsby; Lauritz Emil Christiansen; Chloe Latimer; Celine Svanback
- Lyricist: IU

IU singles chronology
"Small Room" (2020)	"Celebrity" (2021)	"Lilac" (2021)

Music video
- "Celebrity" on YouTube

"Celebrity" is a song by South Korean singer-songwriter IU. It was released on January 27, 2021, through EDAM Entertainment via Kakao M, and serves as the lead single from her fifth Korean-language studio album, Lilac. A dance-pop and electropop track, "Celebrity" was written by IU, with additional composition by Chloe Latimer and Celine Svanback, and Ryan S. Jhun, Jeppe London Bilsby, Lauritz Emil Christiansen, —the last three also handled arrangement.

== Background ==
IU first teased that a new single was in the works while onstage at the 35th Golden Disc Awards on January 9, 2021. As she accepted the Digital Daesang award for "Blueming", she stated that the new song would be "refreshing" and "gives people strength". On January 11, her label, Edam Entertainment, announced that she would return with a pre-release single titled "Celebrity" on January 27, 2021. The label hinted that the new song would be a cheerful pop sound with energetic music genre.

"Celebrity" was subsequently released on January 27 for digital download and streaming as the lead single off of IU's fifth Korean-language studio album, Lilac. The single marked her first offering following the release of the chart-topping single "Eight"—a collaboration with BTS' Suga—in May 2020. The track was written and composed by IU, Ryan S. Jhun, Jeppe London Bilsby, Lauritz Emil Christiansen, Chloe Latimer and Celine Svanback, with arrangement conducted by Bilsby, Christiansen and Jhun.

== Composition ==
Musically, "Celebrity" is described as a dance-pop track that incorporates a variety of genres, including pop, electronic music and tropical house, and signals a shift from much of IU's previous discography. Regarding the musicality of the single, EDAM Entertainment stated that "the song has a bright and cheerful pop sound that can energize those listening to it. It's a genre of music that IU is trying for the first time". Furthermore, the agency commented about the upcoming album's musical direction, saying "it will be her venture into more energetic and pop beat genres". Lyrically, the song explores the themes of fame, identity, insecurities, loss and the notion of living as a celebrity. The song was composed in the key of A major with a tempo of 100 beats per minute, and run for 3 minutes and 16 seconds.

== Commercial performance ==
Upon release, "Celebrity" debuted atop the Gaon Digital Chart, becoming IU's 17th number one single and 25th number-one overall when including featured appearances and OSTs. The song remained atop the chart for six consecutive weeks, becoming one of the longest songs in the chart's history to remain at number one. Internationally, "Celebrity" debuted and peaked at number 2 and number 13 in Singapore and New Zealand respectively. The song placed at number 3 in its opening week on the World Digital Song Sales chart, where it peaked. On the Billboard Global Excl. US chart, the song debuted at number 190 before entering at number 78 on the standard Billboard Global 200 the following week, marking her first appearance on the global chart.

== Music video and promotion ==
On January 25, 2021, a music video teaser for "Celebrity" was released on Kakao M's official YouTube channel. The music video, directed by Paranoid Paradigm and produced by VM Project Architecture, was subsequently uploaded on January 27, in conjunction with the release of the single.

== Accolades ==
Awards and nominations
Year	Organization	Award	Result	Ref.
2021	Melon Music Awards	Song of the Year	Nominated	
2021	Mnet Asian Music Awards	Best Vocal Performance – Solo	Won	
2021	Mnet Asian Music Awards	Song of the Year	Nominated	
2022	Gaon Chart Music Awards	Digital Song Bonsang	Won	
2022	Golden Disc Awards	Digital Song Bonsang	Won	
2022	Golden Disc Awards	Digital Daesang	Won	

Music program awards (11 total)
Program	Date	Ref.
Inkigayo	February 7, 2021	
Inkigayo	February 21, 2021	
Inkigayo	February 28, 2021	
Music Bank	February 5, 2021	
Music Bank	February 12, 2021	
Music Bank	March 12, 2021	
Music Bank	April 2, 2021	
Show Champion	February 10, 2021	
Show! Music Core	February 6, 2021	
Show! Music Core	February 20, 2021	
Show! Music Core	March 13, 2021	

== Credits and personnel ==
Credits adapted from Melon.

- IU — vocals, lyricist, composer, chorus
- Ryan S. Jhun — composer, arranger
- Jeppe London Bilsby — composer, arranger
- Lauritz Emil Christiansen — composer, arranger
- Chloe Latimer — composer
- Celine Svanback — composer
- Son Myung-gap @Kakao Entertainment — recording
- Jongpil Koo @Klang Studio — mixing
- Kang Seon-young — assisted
- Jung Yu-ra — assisted

== Charts ==
=== Weekly charts ===
"Celebrity" weekly chart performance
Chart (2021)	Peak position
Global 200 (Billboard)	78
Malaysia (RIM)	3
New Zealand Hot Singles (RMNZ)	13
Singapore (RIAS)	2
South Korea (Gaon)	1
South Korea (K-pop Hot 100)	1
US World Digital Songs (Billboard)	3

=== Monthly charts ===
"Celebrity" monthly chart performance
Chart (2021)	Position
South Korea (Gaon)	1
South Korea (K-pop Hot 100)	1

=== Yearly charts ===
"Celebrity" year-end chart performance
Chart (2021)	Position
South Korea (Gaon)	1
Chart (2022)	Position
South Korea (Circle)	52
Chart (2023)	Position
South Korea (Circle)	182

== Certifications ==
Region	Certification	Certified units/sales
Streaming
South Korea (KMCA)	2× Platinum	200,000,000^{†}
Japan (RIAJ)	Gold	50,000,000^{†}
^{†} Streaming-only figures based on certification alone.

== Release history ==
Release dates and formats
Region	Date	Format	Label	Ref.
Various	January 27, 2021	Digital download; streaming	Kakao M	

== See also ==
- List of Inkigayo Chart winners (2021)
- List of Music Bank Chart winners (2021)
- List of Show Champion Chart winners (2021)
- List of Show! Music Core Chart winners (2021)
