= Traffic Light (song) =

Single by Lee Mu-jin

from the EP Room Vol. 1
- Language: Korean
- Released: May 14, 2021
- Genre: Jazz; folk; pop
- Length: 3:52
- Label: ShowPlay, Kakao
- Songwriter: Lee Mu-jin

Lee Mu-jin singles chronology
"Traffic Light" (2021)	"The Assignment Song" (2021)

Music video
- "Traffic Light" on YouTube

"Traffic Light" (Korean: 신호등; RR: Sinhodeung) is a song by Korean singer and songwriter Lee Mu-jin. It was released on May 14, 2021, as Lee's first single after his third-place finish on Korean music audition show Sing Again in 2020.

== Background ==
In November 2020, Lee was entered into the popular South Korean music audition show Sing Again. The shows aim is to take nameless singers and open them up to public interest, which means every contestant is referred to by a number instead of their name, which left Lee anonymous throughout the show's duration. Lee progressed through each round and was one of six people to compete in the finals on February 8, 2021, where he finished in third place. His performance of "Is Anybody There?" has currently amassed over 30 million views on YouTube, showcasing his popularity. After finishing third, he began working on "Traffic Light," and released the song three months after the show's conclusion. The songs concept is a reference to a line he said during his initial performance on the show, where he stated he was "a yellow light type of singer."

== Lyrics ==
"Traffic Light"
The namesake song uses the traffic light as a metaphor for determining a state of certainty and ease. In the chorus, Lee is confused by the "yellow" light and having a hard time slowing down within its 'three short seconds' of display, signifying the light as a symbol for uncertainty and anxiety.

Lee's self-written lyrics to "Traffic Light" compare the anxiety people feel in their early-twenties to the feelings of a learning driver. In the chorus, he sings "red and green, in between are 3 short seconds," referring to the amber light often found on traffic lights. Lee compares moments of anxiety while growing up to yellow lights found on roads. He describes the amber light by saying "it makes me hollow, I don't even know if I'm going fast or slow, it's just all yellow in front of me" comparing the light to the anxiety in life that confuses his mind in between moments of relaxation and excitement.

== Music video ==
The music video for "Traffic Light" was published 14 May 2021, and shows Lee meeting his friends in a forest cabin for his birthday. The video begins with Lee using a map to search for the house, before he sees his friends driving in the distance. He hops in their car, and they make their way to a nearby lake where Lee plays his friends' music while they drink coffee by a campfire. They then make their way to the cabin, and are shown having fun in its garden with water balloons, a trampoline and water pistols. The music videos ends with Lee's birthday party, and quick flashbacks to previous points in his day.

== Credits and personnel ==
- Lee Mu-jin – vocals, composition, lyrics, arrangement
- Yoo Jong-ho – arrangement, keyboard, guitar bass, drum, recording directing
- Lee Tae-wook – guitar
- Lee Seo-yeon – piano
- B'Sound – brass
- Kim Kwang-min - recording
- MasterKey – mixing
- Kwon Nam-woo – mastering

== Charts ==
=== Weekly charts ===
Chart (2021–2022)	Peak position
South Korea (Gaon)	1
South Korea (K-pop Hot 100)	1

=== Monthly charts ===
Chart (2021)	Peak position
South Korea (Gaon)	1
South Korea (K-pop Hot 100)	1

=== Year-end charts ===
Year-end chart performance for " Traffic Light"
Chart (2021)	Position
South Korea (Gaon)	8
Chart (2022)	Position
South Korea (Circle)	13
Chart (2023)	Position
South Korea (Circle)	152

== Accolades ==
Music program awards
Program	Network	Date (4 total)	Ref.
Inkigayo	SBS	August 22, 2021	
Inkigayo	SBS	September 19, 2021	
Inkigayo	SBS	September 26, 2021	
Music Bank	KBS2	September 10, 2021	

== Certifications ==
Certifications for "Traffic Light"
Region	Certification	Certified units/sales
Streaming
South Korea (KMCA)	2× Platinum	200,000,000^{†}
^{†} Streaming-only figures based on certification alone.

== See also ==
- List of Music Bank Chart winners (2021)
