= Lilac (IU song) =

2021 single by IU

Single by IU

from the album Lilac
- Language: Korean
- Released: March 25, 2021
- Genre: Pop
- Length: 3:34
- Label: Edam Entertainment
- Songwriters: IU; Im Soo-ho; Dr.JO; Ung Kim; N!ko
- Producers: Im Soo-ho; Ung Kim; N!ko

IU singles chronology
"Celebrity" (2020)	"Lilac" (2021)	"Coin" (2021)

Music video
- "Lilac" on YouTube

"Lilac" (Korean: 라일락) is a song by South Korean singer-songwriter IU. It was released on March 25, 2021, by Edam Entertainment through Kakao M as the second single from her fifth studio album of the same name. The song is an upbeat pop song with a nostalgic sound.

== Composition and lyrics ==
"Lilac" is a pop song with a thumping drumline and driving rhythm guitar. In the song IU recognizes that life does not always imitate art, which consoles us with its neat and memorable endings, and ties up its threads in a way that life rarely does.

== Accolades ==
Awards and nominations
Year	Organization	Award	Result	Ref.
2022	Gaon Chart Music Awards	Digital Song Bonsang	Won	
2022	Korean Music Awards	Best Pop Song	Nominated	
2022	Seoul Music Awards	Best Song	Won	

Music program awards (8 total)
Program	Date	Ref.
M Countdown	April 1, 2021	
Inkigayo	April 4, 2021	
Inkigayo	April 11, 2021	
Inkigayo	April 18, 2021	
Show Champion	April 7, 2021	
Music Bank	April 16, 2021	
Show! Music Core	April 17, 2021	
Show! Music Core	May 8, 2021	

== Charts ==
=== Weekly charts ===
"Lilac" weekly chart performance
Chart (2021)	Peak position
Singapore (RIAS)	6
South Korea (Gaon)	1
South Korea (K-pop Hot 100)	1
US World Digital Songs (Billboard)	11

=== Year-end charts ===
"Lilac" year-end chart performance
Chart (2021)	Position
South Korea (Gaon)	4
Chart (2022)	Position
South Korea (Circle)	56
Chart (2023)	Position
South Korea (Circle)	190

== See also ==
- List of Music Bank Chart winners (2021)
