= Gone (Rosé song) =

2021 single by Rosé

- Promotional graphic

Single by Rosé

from the album R
- A-side: "On the Ground"
- Released: 4 April 2021
- Recorded: 2019
- Studio: The Black Label (Seoul)
- Genre: Soft rock; indie rock; alternative rock
- Length: 3:27
- Label: YG; Interscope
- Songwriters: Rosé; Brian Lee; J. Lauryn; Teddy
- Producers: 24; Brian Lee

Rosé singles chronology
"On the Ground" (2021)	"Gone" (2021)	"APT." (2024)

Music video
- "Gone" on YouTube

"Gone" is a song by New Zealand and South Korean singer Rosé from her debut single album R (2021). It was released through YG Entertainment and Interscope Records on 4 April 2021, as the second single from the album. The song was written by Rosé alongside Brian Lee, J. Lauryn and Teddy, and was produced by Lee and 24. "Gone" is a soft rock, alternative rock and indie rock romantic ballad about lamenting past love and future loneliness. The song was Rosé's final solo release under YG and Interscope Records, following her departure from the labels in December 2023.

The song was released as a single alongside the release of its music video on 4 April. Directed by Kwon Yong-soo, the video shows the singer mourning the loss of a relationship in an elaborately decorated old house. In South Korea, "Gone" peaked at number six on the Gaon Digital Chart and number five on the Billboard K-pop Hot 100. The song peaked at number one in Malaysia, and entered the top ten in Hungary and Singapore. It debuted in the top 100 of several countries, including Australia, Canada, and Hungary, and at number 29 on the Billboard Global 200. Rosé performed the single on the South Korean music programs M Countdown, Show! Music Core, and Inkigayo, as well as Blackpink's online concert The Show and their Born Pink World Tour.

== Background and release ==
On 30 December 2020, in an interview with South Korean media outlet Osen, Rosé revealed that filming for her debut music video would begin in mid-January 2021. On 25 January 2021, a 33-second teaser titled "Coming Soon" was uploaded to Blackpink's official YouTube channel and featured Rosé singing a snippet of an unknown track. Later that day, it was announced that Rosé would showcase a portion of the unknown track, later revealed to be titled "Gone", at Blackpink's first virtual concert, The Show, on 31 January 2021. On 11 March, Rosé revealed in an online press conference that "Gone" was originally recorded two years earlier. The following day, the song was officially released as the second track off the single album, R. A month later, on 5 April 2021, it was officially released as a single, alongside its music video.

== Composition and reception ==
"Gone" was written by Brian Lee, J. Lauryn, Teddy, and Rosé, and produced by 24 and Brian Lee. It is a soft rock, alternative rock and indie rock romantic ballad underlaid with an electric guitar. Pertaining to a mellow vibe, the production of the song features a "stripped-back" sound and built around strummed guitar chords. The lyrics to "Gone" describe a female protagonist who still has feelings for her former lover, who has moved on. The singer's vocals were described as "raw" and "direct". In terms of musical notation, the song is composed in the key of F♯ major, with a tempo of 80 beats per minute, and runs for three minutes and twenty-seven seconds.

This song is the most poetic, heartbreaking, and honest song that I have ever recorded and I am proud that it’s finally in your hands. I remember recording this and feeling all sorts of butterflies in my stomach because I couldn’t wait for you guys to hear it. I hope you feel all the emotions that are so vulnerably captured in this song.

— Rosé on the song's meaning.

"Gone" received positive reviews from music critics; with many noting the use of English lyrics. Writing for Beats Per Minute, JT Early described the song as a "moody, guitar-driven break-up track." Rhian Daly off NME stated that "on paper, [the song] sounds boring and uninspired but, with Rosé’s vocals on top of the real thing, it becomes a diamond in the rough." Justin Curto of Vulture described the song as a "stripped-back ballad." Following the performance at Blackpink's virtual concert, Teen Vogue wrote that "Gone" has "an indie-rock sensibility, with beachy electric guitars." Jeff Benjamin of Billboard described the track as "an emotional, acoustic-leaning cut, revealing vulnerable lyrics." A journalist for the Korean Broadcasting System, a South Korean television and radio company, felt that "Gone" perfectly reveals the theme of a departed love.

== Music video ==
=== Background ===
On 27 March 2021, the singer confirmed during an Instagram Live broadcast that the video for "Gone" would be released "very, very soon". On 31 March, Rosé announced via her social media accounts that the music video would be released in five days. On 4 April the second teaser poster was released and the official music video was released later that day. The music video for "Gone" reached 10 million views on YouTube in half a day after its release. It garnered 15 million views in its first 24 hours, marking the fourth biggest 24-hour debut for a Korean female soloist. The behind the scenes video was uploaded on 7 April. On 5 July the music video surpassed 100 million views on YouTube.

=== Synopsis ===
A scene in the "Gone" music video, where Rosé is seen sitting alone in front of a projector.

The music video shows the singer on an emotional roller coaster while looking back on a past romance. It opens with Rosé wrapped in a furry green jacket while waking up on a candlelit bathroom floor, slowly opening her eyes next to a bathtub. Next, Rosé is happily smelling roses, playing chess with her lover and twirling around with a handheld camera in an elaborately decorated old house. The scenes change from the singer acting happy and carefree to lying sadly and realising that her relationship is over. Meanwhile, vivid splashes of spilled wine and dripping candle wax foreshadow the red rose's inevitable end. Rosé then appears sitting alone at a nighttime bus stop, wearing a little black dress and a pair of white platform boots. The singer is then shown in a rainbow-colored dress while sitting on a couch. Then the music video shows Rosé in front of a projector, angrily throwing ripped pillows in a dark room, throwing out old picture frames and standing amid a blazing fire, while the house's furniture is covered in tarp. In the final scene, the singer is in a denim jacket and mutlicolored camisole dress, dining alone with a glass of red wine in the kitchen.

== Commercial performance ==
"Gone" debuted and peaked at number 29 on the Global 200 with 19.6 million streams and 25,000 sold worldwide, and at number 17 on the Global Excl. U.S. with 17.4 million streams and 19,000 sold outside the U.S. In South Korea, the song debuted at number 49 on the Gaon Digital Chart for the chart issue date 7–13 March 2021, before ascending to its peak of number six the following week. It also debuted at number five on the Billboard K-pop Hot 100. In North America, the song debuted at number 77 on the Billboard Canadian Hot 100 and number 15 on the US Billboard Digital Song Sales chart. It charted in Oceania as well, peaking at number 63 on the ARIA Singles Chart in Australia; in New Zealand, the song landed at number 18 on the Top 20 New Zealand Singles chart, which ranks the 20 best-performing songs in the country by New Zealand artists, and number six on the Hot 40 Singles chart, which ranks the 40 fastest-moving tracks in the country. "Gone" also debuted at number one in Malaysia and number two in Singapore.

== Live performances ==
On 31 January 2021 the singer performed "Gone" at Blackpink's first virtual concert, The Show. On 14 March 2021, Rosé made the debut performance of "On the Ground" and "Gone" on SBS' Inkigayo. Throughout March, the singer continued to perform the song on M Countdown, Show! Music Core, and Inkigayo. In April 2023, Rosé performed "Gone" as part of her solo stage during Blackpink's setlist as the headlining act of the Coachella Valley Music and Arts Festival. On 2 July 2023, she also performed the song during Blackpink's set as the headlining act of BST Hyde Park in London.

== Accolades ==
Awards and nominations for "Gone"
Year	Organisation	Award	Result	Ref.
2021	Asian Pop Music Awards	Best Composer (Overseas) (Note: Composers: 24 and Brian Lee)	Nominated	
2021	Asian Pop Music Awards	Best Producer (Overseas) (Note: Producers: 24 and Brian Lee)	Nominated	

== Credits and personnel ==
Credits adapted from the liner notes of R.

Recording

- Recorded at The Black Label Studio (Seoul)
- Mastered at Sterling Sound (New York City)

Personnel

- Rosé – vocals, songwriter
- Brian Lee – songwriter, producer
- J. Lauryn – songwriter
- Teddy – songwriter
- 24 – producer
- Yongin Choi – recording engineer
- Josh Gudwin – mixing engineer
- Randy Merrill – mastering engineer

== Charts ==
=== Weekly charts ===
Weekly chart performance
Chart (2021–23)	Peak position
Australia (ARIA)	63
Canada Hot 100 (Billboard)	77
Global 200 (Billboard)	29
Hungary (Single Top 40)	9
Malaysia (RIM)	1
New Zealand Aotearoa Singles (RMNZ)	18
New Zealand Hot Singles (RMNZ)	6
Portugal (AFP)	186
Singapore (RIAS)	2
South Korea (Gaon)	6
South Korea (K-pop Hot 100)	5
UK Singles Sales (OCC)	41
US Digital Song Sales (Billboard)	15
Vietnam (Vietnam Hot 100)	28

=== Monthly charts ===
Monthly chart performance
Chart (2021)	Peak position
South Korea (Gaon)	21
South Korea (K-pop Hot 100)	15

=== Year-end charts ===
Year-end chart performance
Chart (2021)	Position
South Korea (Gaon)	148

== Certifications ==
Certifications
Region	Certification	Certified units/sales
Brazil (Pro-Música Brasil)	Platinum	40,000^{‡}
^{‡} Sales+streaming figures based on certification alone.

== Release history ==
Release dates and formats
Region	Date	Format	Label	Ref.
Various	4 April 2021	Digital download; streaming	YG; Interscope	

== See also ==
- List of K-pop songs on the Billboard charts
- List of number-one songs of 2021 (Malaysia)
