= Butter (song) =

2021 single by BTS

- 7-inch, cassette, and digital single cover

Single by BTS
- B-side: "Permission to Dance"
- Released: May 21, 2021
- Studio: Dogg Bounce (Seoul); Larry and George (New York)
- Genre: Dance-pop; disco-pop; EDM
- Length: 2:44
- Label: Big Hit; Sony Music
- Songwriters: Jenna Andrews; Rob Grimaldi; Stephen Kirk; RM; Alex Bilowitz; Sebastian Garcia; Ron Perry
- Producers: Grimaldi; Kirk; Perry

BTS singles chronology
"Film Out" (2021)	"Butter" (2021)	"Permission to Dance" (2021)

Music video
- "Butter" on YouTube

Megan Thee Stallion singles chronology
"Thot Shit" (2021)	"Butter" (remix) (2021)	"SG" (2021)

Visualizer
- "Butter (feat. Megan Thee Stallion)" on YouTube

Audio sample
- file; help

"Butter" is a song recorded by South Korean boy band BTS. It was released as a digital single on May 21, 2021, through Big Hit Music and Sony Music Entertainment, as the band's second English-language single. A disco-pop, dance-pop, and EDM track, the song was written by Jenna Andrews, RM, Alex Bilowitz, Sebastian Garcia, Robert Grimaldi, Stephen Kirk, and Ron Perry, with production handled by the last three.

Upon release, "Butter" received positive reviews from music critics, with praise towards its catchiness. It was a commercial success, topping charts in Hungary, India, Japan, Malaysia, Mexico, Singapore, South Korea, the United States, and Vietnam, as well as Billboard's Global 200 chart. The song also reached the top 10 in over 30 other countries worldwide. A remix featuring American rapper-songwriter Megan Thee Stallion was also released on August 27, 2021, which peaked at number three on the Global 200.

== Recording ==
Speaking on how "Butter" came about, Variety quoted RM in an interview with Apple Music as saying that "[the band] never expected to release another single, but the virus is getting longer and longer so we thought we need another summer song. We thought we needed another summer number, and 'Butter' was perfectly fit for that. And now we're here". J-Hope described the recording process as "smooth" and the song as "focus[ed] more on showing each of the members' charms compared with 'Dynamite'".

== Composition and lyrics ==
Initial reports about "Butter" called it "a dance pop track brimming with the smooth yet charismatic charm of BTS". Rolling Stone described it as "a pure, swaggering dance-pop celebration in the retro vein of Bruno Mars, with layers of Jam and Lewis-style synths", and RM told the outlet that the song "[is] very energetic" and "very summery". Forbes called it an "infectious disco-pop track" similar to "Dynamite", with a "pulsating, bass-heavy beat and delectable chorus". Following its release, "Butter" was categorized as a 1980s and 1990s-influenced dance-pop and EDM song with elements of pop rap. The song is in 4/4 common time in the key of A-flat major with a tempo of 110 beats per minute. BTS's vocal range span from A♭_{3} to E♭_{5}.

At a press conference held on the day of the song's release, RM revealed that while the band wanted to participate in the writing of their next single, they believed "Butter" already sounded "pretty good" and "pretty complete" when they received it, so they chose it out of "many, many songs" that had been sent to them for consideration. He further explained however, that he "changed or added to about half of the song's original rap sections" because "some of the parts like the rap were not fully compatible with our style", and despite there still being "some gaps" in his fluency with English "it came together really quickly since there weren't that many rap sections in the song". Suga also tried writing for the song, as he had actively been studying English during the year prior, but the language barrier was still a problem, so his suggestions were "immediately dropped. No questions, no consideration — just immediately binned". Lyrically, like "Dynamite", "Butter" has "no heavy message"; Jimin noted that there was no profound meaning behind the track and that the goal was for it to be "easy to listen to".

A video teaser released on May 18 offered the first preview of the song's lyrics; the line "Get it! Let it roll!" was briefly heard at the end of the clip. Korean news media later reported that the lyrics to "Butter" "cutely confess a sweet, romantic love", and had "BTS' smooth-like-butter unrivalled charms melted into the song".

== Release and promotion ==
On April 5, 2021, days after the release of their Japanese single "Film Out", it was revealed that BTS would release a new song in May. However, Big Hit Music announced that "we will reveal our artists' plans after they are finalized". On April 26, the single's title and release date were announced in an hour-long YouTube live stream of an animated stick of butter melting. The video featured a countdown with kitchen sounds in the background, and the text "Butter" and "May 21, 2021" appeared at the end of the stream. The livestream amassed over 12.8 million views. Concept photos and video teasers for the song, set to be BTS's second English-language single, were shared through the band's official social media in the weeks following. They held a global press conference one hour after the single's release.

BTS appeared as the first guests on Big Hit's new exclusive Melon Station radio series, BigHit Music Record, on May 21 to introduce "Butter" and participate in a Q&A with fans. The single impacted American contemporary hit radio stations on May 25. On May 27, Big Hit announced the release of a house bass electro-dance remix of the song, "Butter (Hotter Remix)", as a thank-you to fans for their support. The announcement was accompanied by new teaser photos for the remix—seven solo shots and one group—featuring a different concept to the original teasers. The remix and its music video premiered globally on all streaming platforms at midnight on May 28. New remixes succeeded the release of the "Hotter" version in the weeks following.

The CD single of "Butter" includes "Permission to Dance", a song written by Ed Sheeran, Johnny McDaid, Steve Mac, and Jenna Andrews and produced by Mac, Stephen Kirk, and Andrews. Released on July 9, it also includes instrumental versions of both songs.

Megan Thee Stallion claimed that her label 1501 Certified Entertainment attempted to block the remix release which featured her. Stallion stated that the label's CEO Carl Crawford did not approve of the track because "it would not be good for her career." Stallion sought help from a Texas court. The remix was ultimately released as planned on August 27.

== Critical reception ==
Professional ratings
Review scores
Source	Rating
IZM	3/5 stars
NME	5/5 stars

Writing for NME, Rhian Daly praised "Butter" as "a clean and crisp piece of dance pop that's undeniably cool without sacrificing immediacy or memorable hooks" and felt it was a strong, early contender for song of the summer. Tom Breihan of Stereogum described the song as "a full-on retro-disco strutter, a song built for parties. It's a big, slick party song that targets pleasure receptors with mathematical precision" and compared it to Daft Punk's Random Access Memories and works by Bruno Mars. Zach Seemayer of Entertainment Tonight felt that the song's hook, with its "truly catchy beat" and "fun" opening lyrics, "has the hallmarks of a real hit with legitimate song-of-the-summer potential". Rolling Stone's Althea Legaspi called "Butter" a "feel-good, flirty dance track". Consequence's Mary Siroky named "Butter" the song of the summer and "a synth-drenched, swaggering track sitting comfortably on an addictive bassline". Esquire's Dave Holmes called the song "irresistible", saying that it "percolates with the joy we've deferred since last March". It was named Billboard's number one Song of the Summer. The song was the seventh most searched song of the year for 2021 on Google. For the Megan Thee Stallion remix, Natasha Mulenga, writing for Teen Vogue, described the remix as "ear-melting" and that "Megan gave so much charisma to the song".

Year-end lists for "Butter"
Publication	List	Rank	Ref.
Billboard	25 Best K-Pop Songs of 2021	6	
Complex	The 15 Best K-Pop and Rap Collaborations of All Time	8	
Consequence	Top 50 Songs of 2021	1	
The Guardian	The 20 best songs of 2021	11	
Insider	The best K-pop songs of 2021	8	
Los Angeles Times	The 100 best songs of 2021	59	
Music Y	Top 10 Songs of 2021	2	
NME	The 50 best songs of 2021	10	
Rolling Stone	The 50 Best Songs of 2021	16	
Uproxx	The Best Songs of 2021	Placed	

== Music video ==
=== Background and synopsis ===
BTS spells out the name of their fandom, "ARMY", while RM (center) raps the line "Got Army right behind us when we say so". Both the lyric and the scene were a special tribute to the band's fans.

The music video for "Butter" was preceded by a 23-second long video teaser published to Hybe Labels's official YouTube channel on May 18. The short monochromatic clip showed BTS dressed in "disco-inspired" suits "with shoulder pads, glitter, and satin galore", standing motionless in a line, while "a groovy percussion ensemble played in the background". The sound then "switched to a delightful Eighties-inspired, synth-bass fusion". The band matched the beat of the "throbbing, bass-heavy dance groove" with synchronized head tilts. The clip ended with a shot of a stack of syrup-covered pancakes with a square of butter on top. Billboard described the teaser's "funky beat" as "reminiscent of Queen's 'Another One Bites the Dust'". Rolling Stone India also noted the teaser's "strong sonic correlation" to the Queen song. The video teaser accumulated over 26 million views in its first 24 hours and surpassed 35 million views shortly afterwards.

Fifteen minutes prior to the music video's premiere, BTS appeared in a special countdown stream on the Hybe YouTube channel to discuss the song while making buttered sandwiches—it was simultaneously released with the single at midnight EST. The visual opens with a shot of vocalist Jungkook dancing into frame as he sings the introductory lines of the song. Interspersed are "striking black and white shots" of the band dressed in "slick suits" dancing together to a "strong percussion ensemble"—first heard in the May 18 teaser—and standing in a lineup while holding mugshot placards with their names on it. The video then "transitions into [a] rich and vibrant color palette" as the band perform "power-packed", "nimble dance moves" in several "dazzling locations with soft, full-color lighting...against an array of flamboyant backdrops" such as a gymnasium (while wearing "summery gymwear"), a mock press conference, an elevator, and "onstage under pulsating lights" in "black-and-yellow tuxedos". The video ends with a shot of J-Hope eating a large piece of butter.

The video's choreography "reflect[s] the upbeat, flirtatious vibe of the song", with J-hope saying that the band tried to put "a lot of those emotions" into it. Signature moves include "kissing your hands, [giving] a mischievous look, or brushing our hair back". The video also features a "TikTok-ready, technicolor elevator sequence" in which the individual members freestyle their dance moves, including "putting on imaginary cologne". At one point, the band use their bodies to form the word "ARMY" as a special homage to their fans.

=== Reception ===
"Butter"'s premiere garnered over 3.9 million peak concurrent viewers on YouTube, surpassing previous record holder "Dynamite"'s over 3 million concurrents attained in August 2020, and set a new all-time record for the biggest music video premiere on the platform. It became the fastest YouTube video to reach 10–100 million views, achieving the former in its first 13 minutes—"Dynamite" did so in 20 minutes—and the latter in 21 hours—three hours faster than "Dynamite". It also became the most viewed YouTube video in the first 24 hours, amassing 108.2 million views—another all-time high on the platform, and set four new Guinness World Records. This gave BTS the top two spots for the biggest YouTube premieres and 24-hour music debuts in the platform's history. "Butter" crossed 200 million views on May 25, surpassing all milestone records up to that point in just four days and one hour, compared to "Dynamite"'s four days and 12 hours. On June 28, it became the longest running #1 debut for a group in Hot 100 history, breaking the 23-year record held by Aerosmith's "I Don't Want to Miss a Thing" (1998).

Entertainment Tonight's Zach Seemayer wrote that the music video "takes fans on a spectacular journey in both set design, color schemes and outfits". On November 29, 2024, the visual surpassed one billion views, becoming BTS's seventh music video to do so.

=== Remix versions ===
A second version of the music video, dubbed the "Hotter Remix", was released on May 26. Dressed in one set of outfits from the original music video, the clip shows the band "at their cheeky best", "cutting loose" and "taking turns at being front and center" while making "goofy, fun faces at the camera and with each other". It ends with a dance outtake of Suga. Following this, a second and third remix version, dubbed the "Sweeter Remix" and "Cooler Remix" respectively, were released in the beginning of June.

== Commercial performance ==
=== Asia ===
"Butter" entered South Korea's Gaon Digital Chart at number four and the component Streaming chart at number 35, but debuted at number one on the component Download chart. The single album version of the song, sold nearly 2.5 million physical copies in South Korea in July, becoming one of the best-selling albums in South Korea.

In Japan, "Butter" earned its largest opening-day digital sales in the country, with 27,772 downloads, surpassing its predecessor "Film Out", which sold 23,344 copies on its first day. With only three days of availability in its tracking period dated May 17–23, the single consecutively maintained first place on the daily chart, and debuted atop the Oricon Weekly Digital Singles chart issue dated May 31, 2021 with 52,821 downloads, giving the band its second digital number-one of the year after "Film Out". It also topped the Weekly Streaming Chart for the same period with 16.607 million streams, marking the biggest weekly streaming debut in Oricon chart history and making BTS the artist with the most number-ones on the ranking (three, including "Dynamite" and "Film Out"). "Butter" became the band's third song to exceed 10 million streams in a single week, making BTS the artist with the most songs (three, including "Dynamite" and "Film Out") to achieve this in Oricon chart history. On the Billboard Japan Hot 100 chart issue for the same period, the song debuted at number two, but topped the component Streaming and Download charts. On May 28, Billboard Japan reported that "Butter" had accumulated 14.835 million streams just three days into the chart's next tracking period (May 24–30) and surpassed the record set by LiSA's "Homura" of 7.526 million streams in 2020 (October 19–21). "Homura" accrued 18.901 million streams at the end of its full tracking period (October 19–25), in what was then the largest streaming week in Billboard Japan chart history—"Butter" achieved over 75% of that in less than half the time. In July, exactly 72 days after its release, the song was certified Platinum by the Recording Industry Association of Japan (RIAJ) for surpassing 100 million streams, making it the fastest single to achieve the certification in RIAJ history. In August, the single's physical version exceeded sales of 250,000 copies and was certified Platinum by the RIAJ. On September 1, Oricon announced that "Butter" had become the fastest song in the chart's history to achieve 200 million streams, doing so in 15 weeks and breaking the record previously set by "Homura" of 19 weeks.

=== United States ===
According to Mediabase, "Butter" was added to all 180 Top 40 radio stations in the United States and received 2,217 spins its first week. It was the first song by an international artist to become the most-added track at radio in its opening week, and BTS are the first group to achieve this feat. "Dynamite" was previously the band's most-added single at radio with 171 stations putting it into rotation in its debut week. With only three days of availability, the single entered Billboard's Pop Airplay chart at number 26, making it the highest debut of the week and the second-highest of the year, behind only Ed Sheeran's "Afterglow", which entered at number 23 in January. It was the band's seventh entry on the airplay chart and a new career best.

"Butter" debuted at number one on the Billboard Hot 100 chart issue dated June 5, 2021, giving BTS its fourth number-one in under nine months. The band became the fastest act to achieve four number-ones since Justin Timberlake in 2006–2007, the first group since the Jackson 5 in 1970, and the only group to debut three songs in the lead. The song accumulated 32.2 million streams, sold 242,800 downloads, and 18.1 million radio airplay audience in its first week. This marked BTS's seventh number-one on the Digital Song Sales chart and the largest sales week since "Dynamite" sold 300,000 copies on the September 5, 2020 issue. Billboard noted that the sales for "Butter" were aided by its original and instrumental versions discounted to 69 cents in its first week. The song also debuted at number four on the Streaming Songs chart, and entered the Rolling Stone 100 at number two, marking the second-highest debut of 2021 behind only Olivia Rodrigo's "Drivers License", and the highest song sales debut of the year. "Butter" remained atop the Hot 100 and Digital Songs charts for ten non-consecutive weeks. On the chart issue dated July 24, 2021, it ranked at number seven while "Permission to Dance" debuted at number one. The following week, it returned to the top of the chart, making BTS the first act to displace itself at number one across two consecutive weeks. As of July 2021, the song has sold over one million copies in the US.

=== Europe ===
In the United Kingdom, "Butter" became the highest-charting new entry on the Official Charts Company's Singles Chart for the period May 28–June 3, 2021, debuting at number three and giving BTS its second top-five entry. The single was also the best-selling new entry on the Downloads Chart, surpassing the number two song by more than 10,000 sales. After an eleven-week chart run between June and August, the song re-entered the Singles chart on September 9 at number 32, following the release of the Megan Thee Stallion remix. The song was certified silver by the British Phonographic Industry (BIP) for moving 200,000 single-equivalent units on August 27, 2021. It also topped the Downloads chart in Ireland and debuted at number seven on the Irish Singles Chart, giving BTS its second top-10 entry in the territory. In Germany, "Butter" debuted at number seven on the Top 100 Singles chart, becoming the band's highest-charting song and second top-10 in the country—it peaked at number six in July.

=== Worldwide ===
With 11.042 million global first-day streams on Spotify, "Butter" set a new Guinness World Record for the biggest song debut in the platform's history, surpassing Ed Sheeran and Justin Bieber's "I Don't Care", which previously held the record since May 2019 with 10.977 million opening-day streams. It set an additional record for the largest single-day streams of any song ever on the platform, with over 20.9 million unfiltered global streams. "Butter" debuted at number one on the Billboard Global 200 with 289.2 million streams and 249,000 downloads worldwide during the May 21–27, 2021, tracking week, marking BTS's fourth number-one on the chart after "Dynamite", "Savage Love (BTS Remix)", and "Life Goes On". The song also topped the Global Excl. U.S chart with 257.4 million streams and 146,200 downloads in territories outside of the US. Per the International Federation of the Phonographic Industry's (IFPI) global music report for 2021, published in 2022, "Butter" was the fourth best-selling single of the year across all digital formats, with 1.76 billion streams accumulated worldwide.

== Controversy ==
"But if there is a conversation inside Billboard about what being No. 1 should represent, then it's up to them to change the rules and make streaming weigh more on the ranking. Slamming us or our fans for getting to No. 1 with physical sales and downloads, I don't know if that's right ... It just feels like we're easy targets because we're a boy band, a K-pop act, and we have this high fan loyalty."

— RM, Billboard

In an article published by Billboard in August 2021, the magazine pointed out that the band's fans have "through above-board means" taken advantage of loopholes in chart tabulations to boost the ranks of singles such as "Butter" in the US and help the song top the Hot 100 for multiple weeks. While the chart performance of singles on the Hot 100 typically depend on streaming and airplay, that of "Butter" was notably driven mostly by sales (the bulk of which came from BTS's webstore, which allows fans to buy multiple copies of a song, unlike iTunes) and by fan-led crowdfunding efforts (including using money collected from fans worldwide on services like PayPal to make purchases that count toward US sales only). However, an article in The Korea Times pushed back against claims of chart manipulation. It opined that fanbases of other artists such as Justin Bieber and Ariana Grande have employed similar promotional measures, that such measures were neither illegal or unethical, and that fans engaging in those measures were merely "intelligent consumers leading global trends".

== Live performances ==
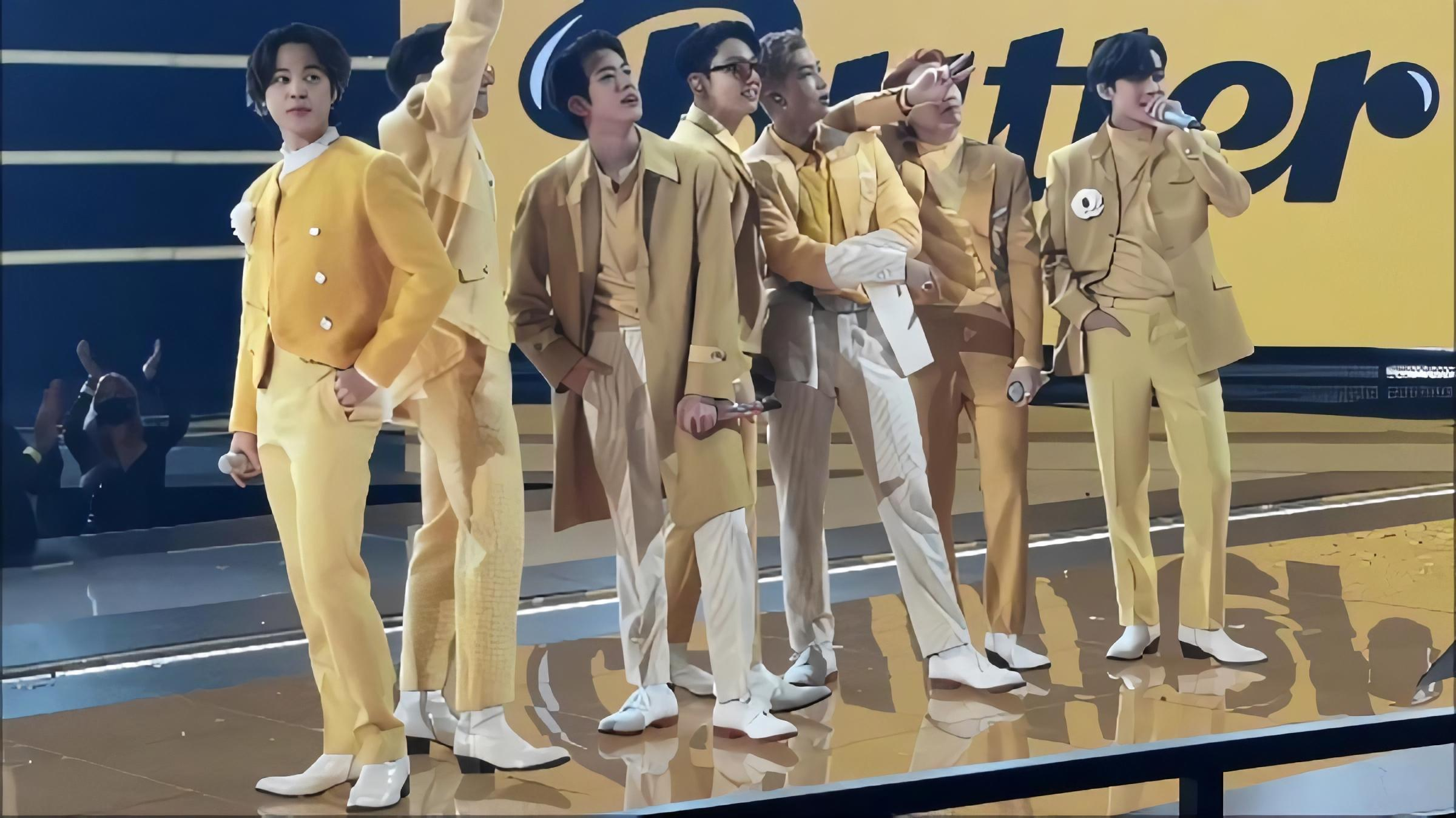
BTS performing "Butter" at the 49th American Music Awards on November 21, 2021

BTS gave the premiere performance of "Butter" live from South Korea for the 2021 Billboard Music Awards on May 23. Dressed in "slick" black tuxedos, the band sang the song while moving through various elaborate sets—a backstage dressing-room area, a soundstage, and replicas of the BBMAs red carpet and stage—accompanied by "pinpoint choreography" that featured "finely manicured" dance moves and an "explosive routine" during the song's instrumental break. The performance ended with the band "smiling and shining in front of a wall of lights". BTS performed the song later that night on The Late Show with Stephen Colbert, this time appearing in "a grand ballroom, fitted out with glorious chandeliers and art deco features, and raining with gold glitter". The band was the first musical act in the lineup for Good Morning America's 2021 Summer Concert Series, appearing on the May 29 episode, where they performed the track as part of a two-song set that also included "Dynamite". They performed both songs again on July 1, at Sirius XM Hits 1. In 2022, BTS performed the song at the 64th Grammy Awards on April 3. Rolling Stone ranked it 14th on its list of the "30 Greatest Grammy Performances of All Time".

The televised world premiere performance of the remix with Megan Thee Stallion was initially scheduled for the 2021 American Music Awards. The rapper later withdrew her appearance at the show, citing personal reasons, and BTS performed the original version of the song instead. The following week, she made a surprise appearance during the second night of the band's four-day concert series at SoFi Stadium and performed the remix together with them for the first time.

== Cover versions ==
American a cappella group Pentatonix performed a cover of the song in a mash-up released on August 17, 2021, which also included "Dynamite".

== Track listing ==
- 7-inch and cassette
1. "Butter" – 2:45
- Digital
1. "Butter" – 2:45
2. "Butter" (instrumental) – 2:42
- Digital (Hotter remix)
1. "Butter" – 2:44
2. "Butter" (Hotter remix) – 2:46
3. "Butter" (instrumental) – 2:42
- Digital EP (Hotter, Sweeter, Cooler)
1. "Butter" – 2:44
2. "Butter" (Hotter remix) – 2:46
3. "Butter" (Sweeter remix) – 2:41
4. "Butter" (Cooler remix) – 2:41
5. "Butter" (instrumental) – 2:42
- CD single and digital EP
1. "Butter" – 2:44
2. "Permission to Dance" – 3:07
3. "Butter" (instrumental) – 2:42
4. "Permission to Dance" (instrumental) – 3:07
- Digital (Megan Thee Stallion remix)
1. "Butter" (Megan Thee Stallion remix) – 2:44
- Digital (Holiday remix)
1. "Butter" (Holiday remix) – 2:41

== Credits and personnel ==
Credits adapted from Melon and Tidal.

- BTS – primary vocals
- Rob Grimaldi – production, songwriting, vocal arrangement/production
- Stephen Kirk – production, songwriting, vocal arrangement/production
- Ron Perry – production, songwriting
- Jenna Andrews – songwriting, background vocals, vocal arrangement/production
- RM – songwriting, gang vocals
- Alex Bilowitz – songwriting
- Sebastian Garcia – songwriting
- Suga – gang vocals
- J-Hope – gang vocals
- Pdogg – vocal arrangement, record engineering
- Juan "Saucy" Peña – record engineering
- Keith Parry – record engineering
- Serban Ghenea – mix engineering
- John Hanes – assistant mix engineering
- Chris Gehringer – mastering

== Charts ==
=== Weekly charts ===
Weekly chart performance for "Butter"
Chart (2021–2022)	Peak position
Argentina Hot 100 (Billboard)	7
Australia (ARIA)	6
Austria (Ö3 Austria Top 40)	7
Belgium (Ultratop 50 Flanders)	41
Belgium (Ultratop 50 Wallonia)	36
Bolivia (Monitor Latino)	6
Brazil (Pop Internacional)	3
Bulgaria (PROPHON)	8
Canada Hot 100 (Billboard)	2
Canada CHR/Top 40 (Billboard)	14
Canada Hot AC (Billboard)	38
CIS Airplay (TopHit)	98
Colombia (Promúsica)	1
Costa Rica (Monitor Latino)	5
Croatian International Albums (HDU)	7
Czech Republic Singles Digital (ČNS IFPI)	5
Denmark (Tracklisten)	22
Ecuador (Monitor Latino)	16
El Salvador (Monitor Latino)	3
Euro Digital Song Sales (Billboard)	1
Finland (Suomen virallinen lista)	15
Finnish Albums (Suomen virallinen lista)	6
France (SNEP)	7
Germany (GfK)	6
Global 200 (Billboard)	1
Greece International (IFPI)	6
Greek Albums (IFPI)	3
Guatemala Anglo (Monitor Latino)	2
Honduras (Monitor Latino)	15
Hungary (Single Top 40)	1
Hungary (Stream Top 40)	8
India International Singles (IMI)	1
Ireland (IRMA)	7
Israel (Media Forest)	8
Italy (FIMI)	27
Japan Hot 100 (Billboard)	1
Japan Combined Singles (Oricon)	2
Japanese Albums (Oricon)	1
Japanese Hot Albums (Billboard Japan)	1
Latvia (EHR)	2
Lithuania (AGATA)	20
Malaysia (RIM)	1
Mexico Top Streaming (AMPROFON)	2
Mexico Airplay (Billboard)	1
Netherlands (Dutch Top 40)	35
Netherlands (Single Top 100)	35
New Zealand (Recorded Music NZ)	6
Norway (VG-lista)	28
Panama (Monitor Latino)	5
Peru (Monitor Latino)	6
Polish Albums (ZPAV)	1
Portugal (AFP)	4
Russia Airplay (TopHit)	84
Singapore (RIAS)	1
Slovakia Airplay (ČNS IFPI)	74
Slovakia Singles Digital (ČNS IFPI)	4
South Africa (RISA)	54
South Korea (Gaon)	1
South Korea (K-pop Hot 100)	1
South Korean Albums (Gaon)	1
Spain (Promusicae)	23
Sweden (Sverigetopplistan)	33
Switzerland (Schweizer Hitparade)	7
UK Singles (Official Charts)	3
UK Indie (Official Charts)	1
US Billboard Hot 100	1
US Adult Contemporary (Billboard)	25
US Adult Pop Airplay (Billboard)	14
US Pop Airplay (Billboard)	7
US Rhythmic Airplay (Billboard)	37
US Rolling Stone Top 100	2
Venezuela (Record Report)	37
Vietnam (Vietnam Hot 100)	1

Hotter remix version
Chart (2021)	Peak position
New Zealand Hot Singles (RMNZ)	30

Megan Thee Stallion remix version
Chart (2021)	Peak position
Global 200 (Billboard)	3
New Zealand (Recorded Music NZ)	27
Panama (PRODUCE)	50
South Korea (Gaon)	200
US Streaming Songs (Billboard)	35

Cream version
Chart (2021)	Peak position
Swedish Albums (Sverigetopplistan)	28

Holiday version
Chart (2022)	Peak position
South Korea (K-pop Hot 100)	35

=== Monthly charts ===
Monthly chart performance for "Butter"
Chart (June–July 2021)	Peak Position
Japanese Albums (Oricon)	2
South Korea (Gaon)	1
South Korea (K-pop Hot 100)	1
South Korean Albums (Gaon)	1

=== Year-end charts ===
2021 year-end chart performance for "Butter"
Chart (2021)	Position
Brazil Streaming (Pro-Música Brasil)	150
Canada (Canadian Hot 100)	32
Global 200 (Billboard)	12
Hungary (Single Top 40)	2
India International Singles (IMI)	1
Japan (Japan Hot 100)	6
Japan Combined Singles (Oricon)	1
Japanese Albums (Oricon)	13
Japanese Hot Albums (Billboard Japan)	17
Mexico (AMPROFON)	4
Portugal (AFP)	128
South Korea (Gaon)	7
South Korean Albums (Gaon)	1
US Billboard Hot 100	11
US Adult Top 40 (Billboard)	40
US Mainstream Top 40 (Billboard)	36

2022 year-end chart performance for "Butter"
Chart (2022)	Position
Global 200 (Billboard)	38
Hungary (Single Top 40)	10
Japan (Japan Hot 100)	12
Japan Combined Singles (Oricon)	5
South Korea (Circle)	45
South Korean Albums (Circle)	87
Vietnam (Vietnam Hot 100)	11

2023 year-end chart performance for "Butter"
Chart (2023)	Position
South Korea (Circle)	79

2024 year-end chart performance for "Butter"
Chart (2024)	Position
South Korea (Circle)	198

=== All-time charts ===
All-time chart performance for "Butter"
Chart (2008–2022)	Position
Japan (Japan Hot 100)	12

== Accolades ==
World records for "Butter"
Year	Organization	Award	Ref.
2021	Guinness World Records	Most viewers for the premiere of a video on YouTube	
2021	Guinness World Records	Most viewers for the premiere of a music video on YouTube	
2021	Guinness World Records	Most viewed YouTube music video in 24 hours	
2021	Guinness World Records	Most viewed YouTube music video in 24 hours by a K-pop group	
2021	Guinness World Records	Most streamed track on Spotify in the first 24 hours	

Awards and nominations for "Butter"
Year	Organization	Award	Result	Ref.
2021	American Music Awards	Favorite Pop Song	Won	
2021	Asia Artist Awards	Song of the Year	Won	
2021	E! People's Choice Awards	The Music Video of 2021	Won	
2021	E! People's Choice Awards	The Song of 2021	Won	
2021	Kids' Choice Awards Mexico	Global Hit	Won	
2021	Melon Music Awards	Song of the Year	Won	
2021	Meus Prêmios Nick	Favorite International Hit	Won	
2021	Meus Prêmios Nick	Video of the Year	Won	
2021	Mnet Asian Music Awards	Best Dance Performance – Male Group	Won	
2021	Mnet Asian Music Awards	Song of the Year	Won	
2021	Mnet Asian Music Awards	Best Music Video	Won	
2021	MTV Video Music Awards	Best K-Pop	Won	
2021	MTV Video Music Awards	Song of Summer	Won	
2021	MTV Video Music Awards	Best Choreography	Nominated	
2021	MTV Video Music Awards	Best Editing	Nominated	
2021	MTV Video Music Awards	Best Pop	Nominated	
2021	MTV Video Music Awards Japan	Best Group Video – International	Won	
2021	MTV Video Music Awards Japan	Video of The Year	Nominated	
2021	Variety's Hitmakers	Record of the Year	Won	
2021	Joox Malaysia Top Music Awards	Top 5 Hits: K-Pop(Mid Year)	Won	
2022	Billboard Music Awards	Top Selling Song	Won	
2022	Billboard Music Awards	Top Global 200 (Excl. U.S.) Song	Nominated	
2022	BMI Pop Awards	Most Performed Song of the year	Won	
2022	Gaon Chart Music Awards	Album of the Year – 3rd Quarter	Won	
2022	Gaon Chart Music Awards	Retail Album of the Year	Won	
2022	Gaon Chart Music Awards	Song of the Year – May	Won	
2022	Golden Disc Awards	Digital Song Bonsang	Won	
2022	Grammy Awards	Best Pop Duo/Group Performance	Nominated	
2022	Hito Music Awards	Western song of the year	Won	
2022	iHeartRadio Music Awards	Best Music Video	Won	
2022	Japan Gold Disc Awards	Best 5 Songs by Download	Won	
2022	Japan Gold Disc Awards	Best 5 Songs by Streaming	Won	
2022	Japan Gold Disc Awards	Song of the Year by Download (Asia)	Won	
2022	Japan Gold Disc Awards	Song of the Year by Streaming (Asia)	Won	
2022	Korean Music Awards	Best K-pop Song	Nominated	
2022	Korean Music Awards	Song of the Year	Nominated	
2022	NME Awards	Best Song in the World	Nominated	
2023	Circle Chart Music Awards	Global Digital Music – December 2021 (Note: the Holiday Remix version)	Nominated	
2023	JASRAC Awards	Foreign Work Award (Note: awarded for 2022)	Won	
2023	Korea Music Copyright Awards	Song of the Year (Note: awarded to the most-streamed song of a given year)	Won	

Music program awards
Program	Date (13 total)	Ref.
Show! Music Core	May 29, 2021	
Show! Music Core	June 5, 2021	
Show! Music Core	June 12, 2021	
Show! Music Core	June 19, 2021	
Show! Music Core	June 26, 2021	
Inkigayo	May 30, 2021	
Inkigayo	June 6, 2021	
Inkigayo	June 13, 2021	
Show Champion	June 2, 2021	
Show Champion	June 16, 2021	
Show Champion	June 23, 2021	
Music Bank	June 4, 2021	
Music Bank	July 16, 2021	

Melon Popularity Award
Award	Date (2021)	Ref.
Weekly Popularity Award	May 31	
Weekly Popularity Award	June 7	
Weekly Popularity Award	June 14	
Weekly Popularity Award	June 21	
Weekly Popularity Award	June 28	

== Certifications and sales ==
Certifications and sales for "Butter"
Region	Certification	Certified units/sales
Canada (Music Canada)	3× Platinum	240,000^{‡}
France (SNEP)	Platinum	200,000^{‡}
Italy (FIMI)	Gold	35,000^{‡}
Japan (RIAJ) Physical	Platinum	250,000^{^}
Japan (RIAJ) Downloads	Platinum	250,000^{*}
New Zealand (RMNZ)	Platinum	30,000^{‡}
Portugal (AFP)	Gold	5,000^{‡}
Spain (Promusicae)	Gold	20,000^{‡}
South Korea (KMCA) Physical	3× Million	3,029,436
United Kingdom (BPI)	Gold	400,000^{‡}
United States (RIAA)	2× Platinum	2,000,000^{‡}
Streaming
Japan (RIAJ)	Diamond	500,000,000^{†}
South Korea (KMCA)	Platinum	100,000,000^{†}
^{*} Sales figures based on certification alone.^{^} Shipments figures based on certification alone.^{‡} Sales+streaming figures based on certification alone.^{†} Streaming-only figures based on certification alone.

== Release history ==
Release dates and formats for "Butter"
Region	Date	Format(s)	Version(s)	Label	Ref.
Various	May 21, 2021	Digital download; streaming	Original	Big Hit	
Italy	May 21, 2021	Radio airplay	Original	Sony	
United States	May 24, 2021	Adult contemporary radio	Original	Columbia	
United States	May 25, 2021	Contemporary hit radio	Original	Columbia	
United States	May 25, 2021	Rhythmic radio	Original	Columbia	
Various	May 28, 2021	Digital download; streaming	Hotter remix	Big Hit	
Various	June 4, 2021	Digital download; streaming	Cooler remix; Sweeter remix	Big Hit	
United States	June 18, 2021	7-inch; cassette single	Original	The Orchard	
Various	July 9, 2021	CD single	Original	Big Hit	
Japan	July 13, 2021	CD single	Original	Universal Music Japan	
Various	August 27, 2021	Digital download; streaming	Megan Thee Stallion remix	Big Hit	
Various	December 3, 2021	Digital download; streaming	Holiday remix	Big Hit	

== See also ==
- List of Billboard Argentina Hot 100 top-ten singles in 2021
- List of Billboard Digital Song Sales number ones of 2021
- List of Billboard Global 200 number ones of 2021
- List of Billboard Hot 100 number ones of 2021
- List of Billboard Hot 100 number-one singles of the 2020s
- List of Billboard Hot 100 top-ten singles in 2021
- List of Gaon Digital Chart number ones of 2021
- List of Hot 100 number-one singles of 2021 (Japan)
- List of Inkigayo Chart winners (2021)
- List of most-liked YouTube videos
- List of Music Bank Chart winners (2021)
- List of number-one songs of 2021 (Malaysia)
- List of number-one songs of 2021 (Singapore)
- List of Show Champion Chart winners (2021)
- List of Show! Music Core Chart winners (2021)
- List of top 10 singles for 2021 in Australia
- List of top 10 singles in 2021 (France)
- List of top 10 singles in 2021 (Ireland)
- List of UK Independent Singles Chart number ones of 2021
- List of UK top-ten singles in 2021
