= List of number-one songs of 2025 (Singapore) =

This is a list of the Official Singapore Chart (formerly Top Streaming Chart) number-one songs in 2025, according to the Recording Industry Association Singapore.

== Chart history ==
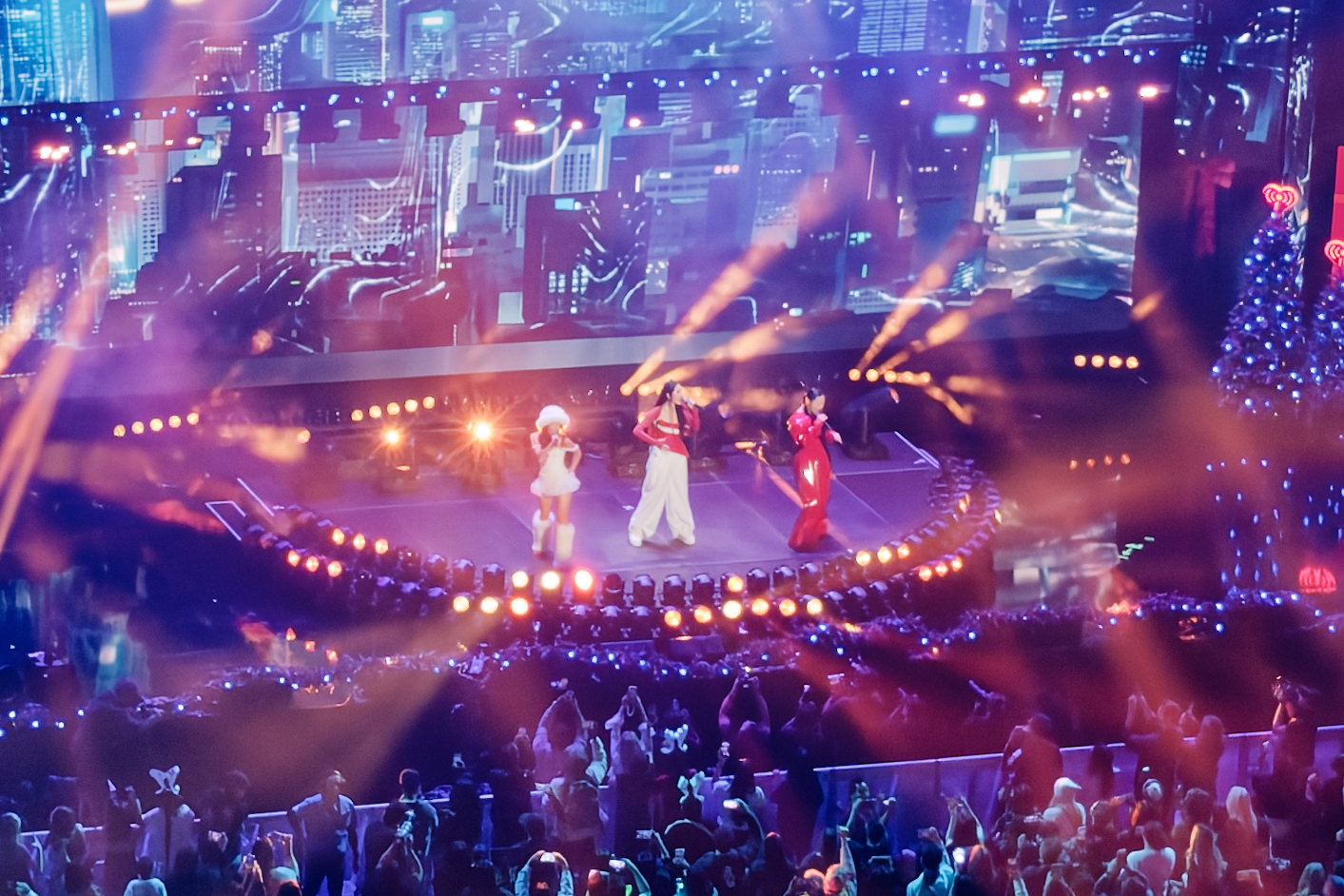
"Golden" by Huntrix (performers Rei Ami, Ejae and Audrey Nuna pictured) topped the chart for 22 weeks total, becoming the longest-running number-one song in the chart's history.

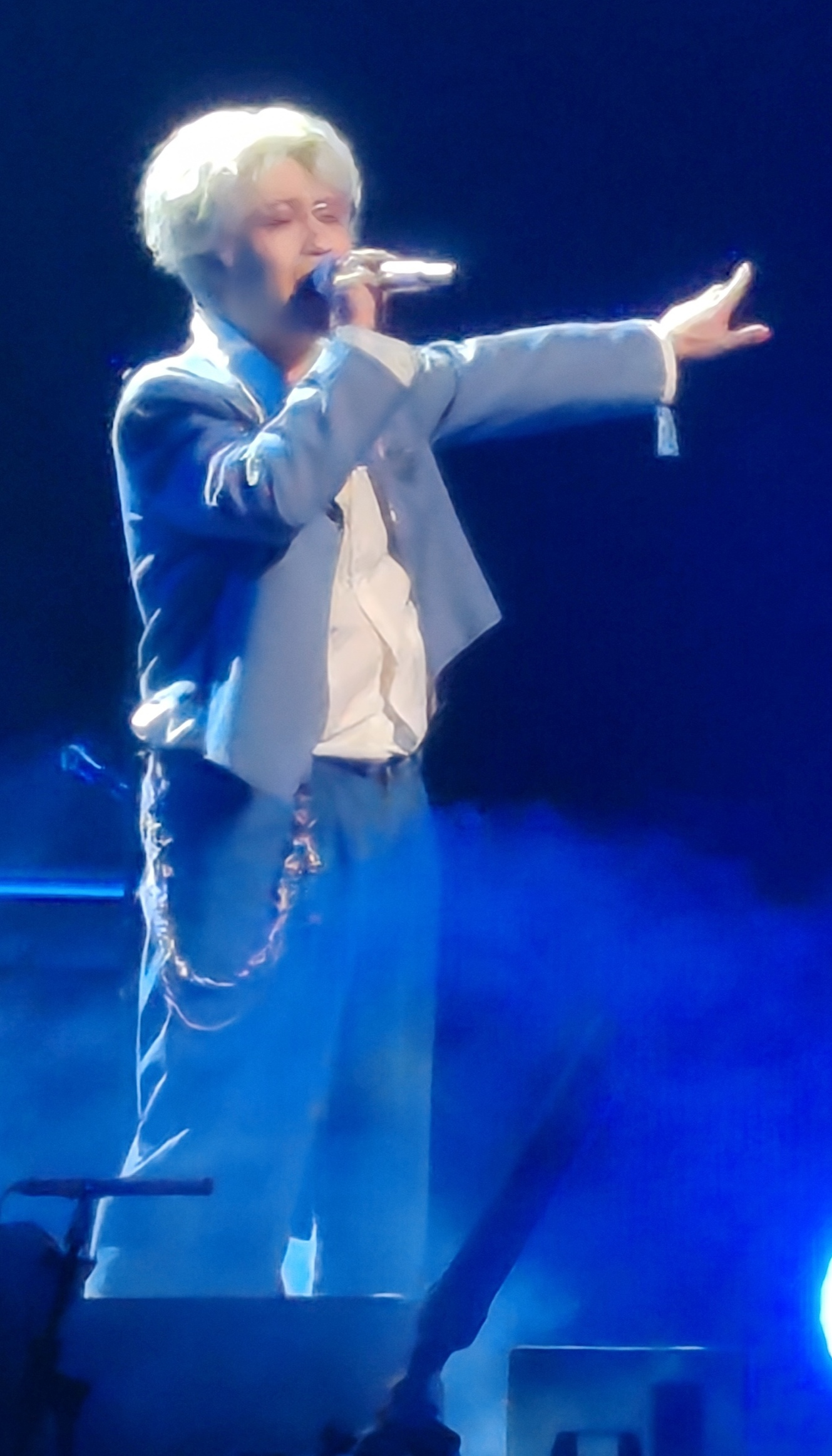
LBI topped the chart for 13 weeks with "Jumping Machine" (跳楼机).

Issue Date	Song	Artist(s)	Ref.
2 January	"APT."	Rosé and Bruno Mars	
9 January	"APT."	Rosé and Bruno Mars	
16 January	"APT."	Rosé and Bruno Mars	
23 January	"APT."	Rosé and Bruno Mars	
30 January	"APT."	Rosé and Bruno Mars	
6 February	"Die with a Smile"	Lady Gaga and Bruno Mars	
13 February	"Die with a Smile"	Lady Gaga and Bruno Mars	
20 February	"Luther"	Kendrick Lamar and SZA	
27 February	"Jumping Machine" (跳楼机)	LBI	
6 March	"Jumping Machine" (跳楼机)	LBI	
13 March	"Jumping Machine" (跳楼机)	LBI	
20 March	"Jumping Machine" (跳楼机)	LBI	
27 March	"Jumping Machine" (跳楼机)	LBI	
3 April	"Jumping Machine" (跳楼机)	LBI	
10 April	"Jumping Machine" (跳楼机)	LBI	
17 April	"Jumping Machine" (跳楼机)	LBI	
24 April	"Jumping Machine" (跳楼机)	LBI	
1 May	"Jumping Machine" (跳楼机)	LBI	
8 May	"Jumping Machine" (跳楼机)	LBI	
15 May	"Jumping Machine" (跳楼机)	LBI	
22 May	"Jumping Machine" (跳楼机)	LBI	
29 May	"Don't Say You Love Me"	Jin	
5 June	"Don't Say You Love Me"	Jin	
12 June	"Don't Say You Love Me"	Jin	
19 June	"Don't Say You Love Me"	Jin	
26 June	"Don't Say You Love Me"	Jin	
3 July	"Don't Say You Love Me"	Jin	
10 July	"Don't Say You Love Me"	Jin	
17 July	"Jump"	Blackpink	
24 July	"Golden"	Huntrix	
31 July	"Golden"	Huntrix	
7 August	"Golden"	Huntrix	
14 August	"Golden"	Huntrix	
21 August	"Golden"	Huntrix	
28 August	"Golden"	Huntrix	
4 September	"Golden"	Huntrix	
11 September	"Golden"	Huntrix	
18 September	"Golden"	Huntrix	
25 September	"Golden"	Huntrix	
2 October	"Golden"	Huntrix	
9 October	"The Fate of Ophelia"	Taylor Swift	
16 October	"The Fate of Ophelia"	Taylor Swift	
23 October	"Golden"	Huntrix	
30 October	"Golden"	Huntrix	
6 November	"Golden"	Huntrix	
13 November	"Golden"	Huntrix	
20 November	"Golden"	Huntrix	
27 November	"Golden"	Huntrix	
4 December	"Golden"	Huntrix	
11 December	"Golden"	Huntrix	
18 December	"Golden"	Huntrix	
25 December	"Golden"	Huntrix	

== Number-one artists ==
List of number-one artists by total weeks at number one
Position	Artist	Weeks at No. 1
1	Huntrix	21
2	LBI	13
3	Bruno Mars	7
3	Jin	7
5	Rosé	5
6	Lady Gaga	2
6	Taylor Swift	2
8	Kendrick Lamar	1
8	SZA	1
8	Blackpink	1
