= Drop tower (disambiguation) =

A drop tower is a type of amusement ride, based around a central structure or tower, where the gondola is lifted to the top of a large vertical structure before being released and falling towards the ground. It may also refer to:

- Drop tube, a structure used to produce a controlled period of weightlessness for an object under study
- Drop Tower: Scream Zone, the specific implementation of the drop tower ride by Cedar Fair amusement parks
- Shot tower, a type of drop tube used to make lead shot
- Jumping machine (song), an album produced by LBI
