= Permission to Dance =

2021 single by BTS

- Digital single cover

Single by BTS
- A-side: "Butter"
- Released: July 9, 2021
- Genre: Dance-pop; disco-pop
- Length: 3:07
- Label: Big Hit; Sony
- Songwriters: Ed Sheeran; Johnny McDaid; Steve Mac; Jenna Andrews
- Producers: Steve Mac; Jenna Andrews; Stephen Kirk

BTS singles chronology
"Butter" (2021)	"Permission to Dance" (2021)	"My Universe" (2021)

Music video
- "Permission to Dance" on YouTube

"Permission to Dance" is a song by South Korean boy band BTS. It was released through Big Hit Music and Sony Music on July 9, 2021, as a stand-alone single. The song was also included as part of the CD release of the group's previous single "Butter", and is the band's third English-language single. The song topped the charts in five countries and reached the top ten in ten other territories.

== Background and release ==
Ed sent us this amazingly good song, and as soon as we listened to it we just couldn't resist it. We thought it went really well with our image too, so we just went with it.

— J-hope talked about working with Ed Sheeran, Entertainment Weekly

On May 21, 2021, BTS released their second English-language single "Butter" to critical and commercial success. The song was initially released digitally, as a cassette, and as a 7-inch vinyl. On June 15, BTS announced a CD release of "Butter" alongside the announcement for a new song. On June 27, Ed Sheeran revealed in an interview with Most Requested Live that he wrote a song for BTS, stating "I've actually worked with BTS on their last record, and I've just written a song for their new record". On July 1, the group revealed the tracklist for the CD release, announcing the song's title as "Permission to Dance". The song was released on July 9, 2021, alongside its instrumental.

== Composition ==
"Permission to Dance" was written by Ed Sheeran, Johnny McDaid, Steve Mac and Jenna Andrews, with production being handled by Mac and Andrews alongside Stephen Kirk. Sheeran had previously co-written "Make It Right", from BTS's Map of the Soul: Persona (2019). The song is performed in the key of E major with a tempo of 125 beats per minute in common time with BTS vocals range spanning from C♯_{4} to B_{5}. Big Hit initially described that the song "will make your heart beat to the rhythm of BTS's positive energy". It is an upbeat dance-pop track which is accompanied by a powerful string section, bouncy piano lines, and an enticing melody.

== Commercial performance ==
"Permission to Dance" debuted at number one on the Billboard Hot 100 in the United States, on the issue dated July 24, 2021, earning 15.9 million streams, 1.1 million radio airplay impressions, and selling 140,000 copies in its first week of release. The song replaced "Butter" from the top of the chart, marking the first time an artist had self-replaced themselves since Drake's "In My Feelings" replaced his own "Nice for What" in 2018. The song also became BTS' fifth number-one hit on the chart in ten months and two weeks, making them the artist with the fastest accumulation of five number-one singles since Michael Jackson did so in 1988. Additionally, it became their fourth single to debut atop the Hot 100, extending their record as the group with the most number-one single debuts (tied with Justin Bieber and Drake, but behind Ariana Grande, who has five). On the Digital Songs chart, "Permission to Dance" became BTS' eighth number-one, extending their record as the group with the most number-one hits on the chart. The song debuted atop the Billboard Hot Trending Songs, a chart powered by Twitter which tracks the most-discussed songs on the platform.

In September, Oricon reported that the single had crossed 100 million streams in Japan, becoming BTS' fifth song to do so. This made the band the second male artist to have five songs accumulate as many streams in the country—Official Hige Dandism holds the record with seven.

== Reception ==
In her 4-star review for NME, Rhian Daly wrote that "Permission to Dance" cemented BTS status as "kings of the feel-good summer smash." She described the song a "classic, uplifting pop" which results in an "undeniable surge of infectious energy."

== Accolades ==
Unlike with past singles, BTS did not attend any domestic television music programs to promote "Permission to Dance", but still won eight first-place trophies, and achieved a Triple Crown on Inkigayo. The song also won the Melon Popularity Award for five consecutive weeks from July 19 to August 16, 2021.

Awards and nominations for "Permission to Dance"
Award ceremony	Year	Category	Result	Ref.
Billboard Music Awards	2022	Top Selling Song	Nominated	
Gaon Chart Music Awards	2022	Song of the Year – July	Won	
Japan Gold Disc Awards	2022	Best 5 Songs by Streaming	Won	
Joox Malaysia Top Music Awards	2021	Top 5 Hits: International	Won	
Meus Prêmios Nick	2021	Challenge Hits of the Year	Won	
MTV Video Music Awards	2022	Best Choreography	Nominated	

Music program awards
Program	Date	Ref.
Show! Music Core	July 17, 2021	
Inkigayo	July 18, 2021	
Inkigayo	August 8, 2021	
Inkigayo	August 15, 2021	
Show Champion	July 21, 2021	
Show Champion	July 28, 2021	
Music Bank	July 23, 2021	
Music Bank	July 30, 2021	

== Music video ==
Big Hit released a teaser video, containing a brief excerpt of the song, that showed BTS dancing and having fun outside of a laundromat in the desert, on July 5 at 12AM KST. The official music video was released on July 9 and garnered 72.3 million views on its first day, becoming the sixth-most viewed YouTube video in the first 24 hours at the time.

=== Synopsis ===
A scene in the music video where BTS can be seen doing sign language as part of the choreography.

Set in a post-pandemic world, the band members are seen dancing in multiple settings including a sunny locale, a laundromat, and a patio. The video's emphasis on service workers echoes the message of BTS's 2018 song "Anpanman," which was inspired by the Japanese picture book hero of the same name and was a promise by the members to give their all in improving the lives of fans; when they debuted their performance, they dressed in the uniforms of firefighters and construction workers, the everyday superheroes who do the same. Similar scenes can be seen in "Permission to Dance," which also features scenes of masked-up employees being welcomed back to work after a year away, a server dancing by herself in a deserted restaurant, a janitor dancing with a teacher in a deserted school hallway, and a mail carrier spotting one of those ubiquitous purple balloons while performing her job. The last 60 seconds of the music video are devoted to the team that works with BTS behind the scenes, and they include a large group of stylists, choreographers, makeup artists, and everyone else who contributes to the creation of music by dancing to the song's choreography with the members.

== Promotion ==
BTS and YouTube announced the Permission to Dance Challenge, which took place from July 23 to August 14, exclusively on YouTube Shorts. On September 10, BTS released a new version of the song's music video on the BANGTANTV YouTube Channel. Those who took part in the "Permission to Dance" YouTube Shorts Challenge appeared in the compilation video. On July 24, the group appeared on SBS evening news program, 8 News for a special interview with news anchor Kim Yong-tae. They also talked about the song on U.S. radio stations Zach Sang Show and 102.7 KIIS FM.

=== Live performances ===
BTS shared the first performance of "Permission to Dance," which premiered on the HYBE Label's official YouTube Channel on July 9 for their comeback special A Butterful Getaway with BTS. The setlist also included "Butter" and "Spring Day". The single debuted on television for the first time on the July 13 episode of on The Tonight Show Starring Jimmy Fallon. The septet performed it in the atrium of a shopping mall decorated with thousands of purple balloons as part of the band's "two-day takeover event" for the show. The band made their Radio 1 Live Lounge debut on July 27, performing three songs: "Permission to Dance", "Dynamite" and a cover of Puff Daddy and Faith Evans' 1997 hit "I'll Be Missing You". BTS also performed the song at the 76th United Nations General Assembly on Septembter 20. On September 26, the group gave a special performance of the song at the Global Citizen Live in Seoul. They performed on The Fact Music Awards on October 2. BTS performed the track on November 24, during their appearance on The Late Late Show with James Corden, accompanied by a moving backdrop that included graffiti-covered walls, purple balloons, and flashing lights, marking their first in-person performance on the show since 2020.

== Track listing ==
- CD single and digital EP
1. "Butter" – 2:44
2. "Permission to Dance" – 3:07
3. "Butter" (instrumental) – 2:42
4. "Permission to Dance" (instrumental) – 3:07
- Digital
1. "Permission to Dance" – 3:07
2. "Permission to Dance" (R&B remix) – 3:36
3. "Permission to Dance" (instrumental) – 3:07

== Credits and personnel ==
Credits adapted from Tidal.

- BTS – primary vocals
- Ed Sheeran – songwriting
- Johnny McDaid – songwriting
- Steve Mac – songwriting, production
- Jenna Andrews – songwriting, production, vocal production
- Stephen Kirk – production, vocal production
- Chris Laws – audio engineer
- Dan Pursey – audio engineer
- Juan Pena – audio engineer
- Keith Perry – audio engineer
- Rob Grimaldi – audio engineer
- Pdogg – audio engineer, vocal arrangement
- John Hanes – audio engineer
- Serban Ghenea – mixing engineer
- Chris Gehringer – mastering engineer

== Charts ==
=== Weekly charts ===
Chart performance for "Permission to Dance"
Chart (2021–2022)	Peak position
Argentina Hot 100 (Billboard)	51
Australia (ARIA)	6
Austria (Ö3 Austria Top 40)	28
Canada Hot 100 (Billboard)	10
Canada CHR/Top 40 (Billboard)	50
Colombia (Promúsica)	6
Costa Rica Anglo (Monitor Latino)	5
Czech Republic Singles Digital (ČNS IFPI)	25
El Salvador (Monitor Latino)	17
Euro Digital Song Sales (Billboard)	2
France (SNEP)	70
Germany (GfK)	23
Global 200 (Billboard)	1
Greece International (IFPI)	26
Guatemala Anglo (Monitor Latino)	3
Hungary (Single Top 40)	2
Hungary (Stream Top 40)	33
India International Singles (IMI)	1
Ireland (IRMA)	17
Italy (FIMI)	67
Japan Hot 100 (Billboard)	1
Japan Digital Singles (Oricon)	1
Lithuania (AGATA)	16
Malaysia (RIM)	1
Mexico Airplay (Billboard)	34
Netherlands (Single Top 100)	62
New Zealand (Recorded Music NZ)	8
Panama (Monitor Latino)	13
Peru Anglo (Monitor Latino)	2
Portugal (AFP)	17
Singapore (RIAS)	1
Slovakia (Singles Digitál Top 100)	25
South Korea (Gaon)	2
South Korea (K-pop Hot 100)	1
Spain (Promusicae)	83
Sweden (Sverigetopplistan)	91
Switzerland (Schweizer Hitparade)	23
UK Singles (Official Charts)	16
UK Indie (Official Charts)	3
Uruguay Anglo (Monitor Latino)	3
US Billboard Hot 100	1
US Rolling Stone Top 100	2
Vietnam (Vietnam Hot 100)	28

=== Monthly charts ===
Monthly chart performance for "Permission to Dance"
Chart (2021)	Peak position
South Korea (Gaon)	3
South Korea (K-pop Hot 100)	1

=== Year-end charts ===
2021 year-end chart performance for "Permission to Dance"
Chart (2021)	Position
Global 200 (Billboard)	71
Hungary (Single Top 40)	45
India International Singles (IMI)	19
Japan (Japan Hot 100)	15
South Korea (Gaon)	25

2022 year-end chart performance for "Permission to Dance"
Chart (2022)	Position
Global 200 (Billboard)	175
Japan (Japan Hot 100)	23
South Korea (Circle)	57

2023 year-end chart performance for "Permission to Dance"
Chart (2023)	Position
South Korea (Circle)	110

== Certifications ==
Certifications for "Permission to Dance"
Region	Certification	Certified units/sales
Japan (RIAJ)	Gold	100,000^{*}
New Zealand (RMNZ)	Gold	15,000^{‡}
United Kingdom (BPI)	Silver	200,000^{‡}
United States (RIAA)	Gold	500,000^{‡}
Streaming
Japan (RIAJ)	3× Platinum	300,000,000^{†}
South Korea (KMCA)	Platinum	100,000,000^{†}
^{*} Sales figures based on certification alone.^{‡} Sales+streaming figures based on certification alone.^{†} Streaming-only figures based on certification alone.

== Release history ==
Release dates and formats for "Permission to Dance"
Region	Date	Format(s)	Version	Label	Ref.
Various	July 9, 2021	Digital download; streaming	Original	Big Hit	
Various	July 23, 2021	Digital download; streaming	R&B remix	Big Hit	

== See also ==
- List of Billboard Hot 100 number ones of 2021
- List of Music Bank Chart winners (2021)
- List of number-one songs of 2021 (Malaysia)
- List of number-one songs of 2021 (Singapore)
