= LBI =

LBI can refer to:

- LBi, a Netherlands-based marketing agency
- LBI (singer), a Chinese singer
- Leo Baeck Institute, New York City, researches German-speaking Jewry
- Liberman Broadcasting, American media company catering to Hispanics
- Living Bibles International, translated the Bible into many languages
- Long-baseline interferometry, in radio astronomy
- Lucy Burns Institute, owns Ballotpedia, an encyclopedia of U.S. politics
- Lutheran Bible Institute, now Golden Valley Lutheran College, St. Paul, Minnesota, U.S.

== Places ==
- Little Barrier Island, New Zealand
- Little Bay Islands, Newfoundland and Labrador, Canada
- London Borough of Islington
- Long Beach Island, Ocean County, New Jersey, U.S.
