= On the Ground =

2021 single by Rosé

- Promotional graphic

Single by Rosé

from the album R
- B-side: "Gone"
- Released: 12 March 2021
- Recorded: 2019
- Studio: The Black Label (Seoul)
- Genre: Pop; electropop; pop rock
- Length: 2:48
- Label: YG; Interscope
- Songwriters: Rosé; Amy Allen; Jon Bellion; Jorgen Odegard; Raúl Cubina; Teddy
- Producers: Jorgen Odegard; Ojivolta; Teddy; Jon Bellion; 24

Rosé singles chronology
"On the Ground" (2021)	"Gone" (2021)

Music video
- "On the Ground" on YouTube

"On the Ground" is the debut solo single by New Zealand and South Korean singer Rosé from her debut single album R (2021). It was released through YG Entertainment and Interscope Records on 12 March 2021, as the lead single from the album. It was written by Rosé alongside Amy Allen, Raúl Cubina, Jon Bellion, Jorgen Odegard, Teddy, and was produced by the latter three alongside Ojivolta and 24. The song is an electropop, pop rock and pop track with synth-pop elements. Its lyrics reflect Rosé's rise to fame, from her childhood in Australia to flying to South Korea and becoming a member of Blackpink.

"On the Ground" received generally favourable reviews from music critics, who complimented its lyrics and Rosé's vocals. Commercially, it became the first song by a solo K-pop artist to reach number one on both the Billboard Global 200 and Global Excl. US charts, and earned Rosé a Guinness World Record as the first artist to top the chart as a soloist and as part of a group. The song peaked at number four on the Gaon Digital Chart and number three on the Billboard K-pop Hot 100 in South Korea, and topped the charts in Malaysia and Singapore. It also became the highest-charting song at the time by a female K-pop soloist on the US Billboard Hot 100, the Canadian Hot 100, and the UK Singles Chart. In Australia, the song peaked at number 31 on the ARIA Singles Chart, becoming Rosé's first entry as a solo artist.

An accompanying music video, directed by Han Sa-min, premiered the same day as the song's release. Upon release, the music video broke several YouTube records for a solo K-pop artist, including for the most-watched premiere and the most views within 24 hours for a music video, accumulating 41.6 million views in that time, for which she received another Guinness World Record. Rosé promoted "On the Ground" with performances on The Tonight Show Starring Jimmy Fallon and several South Korean music programs including M Countdown, Inkigayo, and Show! Music Core. The song received several accolades, including Best Dance Performance at the 2021 Mnet Asian Music Awards.

== Background and release ==
On 30 December 2020, in an interview with South Korean media outlet Osen, Rosé revealed that filming for her debut music video would begin in mid-January 2021. On 25 January 2021, a 33-second teaser titled "Coming Soon" was uploaded to Blackpink's official YouTube channel and featured Rosé singing an snippet of an unknown track. Rosé's label YG Entertainment disclosed that she had "completed all filming for her solo album title track's music video in mid-January", and the release will be "surely different from Blackpink's usual musical style". On 2 March, it was announced that Rosé would debut her solo project on 12 March, making her the first Blackpink member to release solo material since Jennie's "Solo" in November 2018. The next day, new teaser poster unveiled the name of the lead single, "On the Ground", for the first time. The first music video teaser for "On the Ground" was released on 7 March. On 8 March 2021, YG revealed the album track listing, which confirmed first-time songwriting contributions from Rosé on the title track. On 9 March, the second music video teaser for the title track was published. "On the Ground" was released for digital download and streaming as the lead single from R on 12 March 2021, by YG Entertainment.

== Composition ==
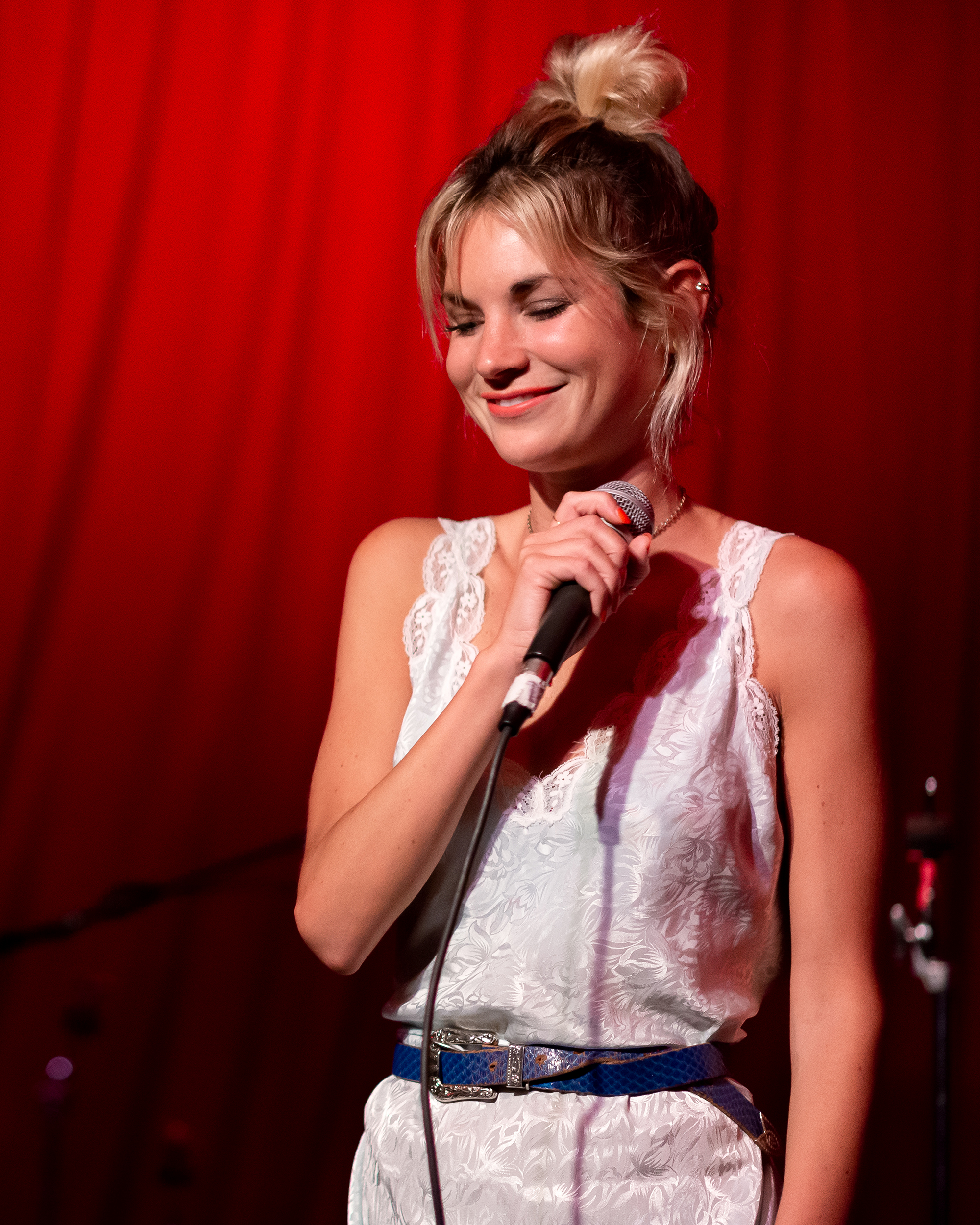
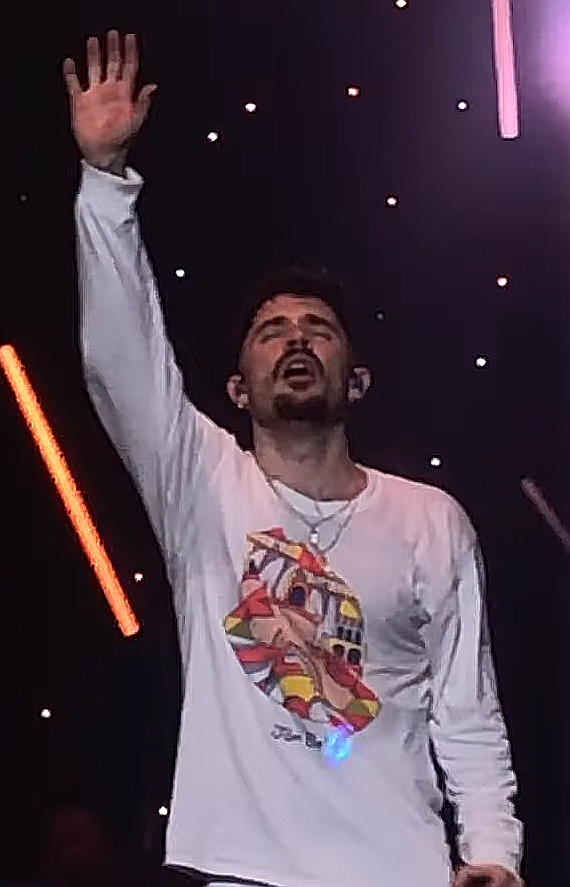
"On the Ground" features songwriting contributions from Amy Allen (left) and Jon Bellion (right).

"On the Ground" was written by Rosé, Amy Allen, Teddy, Raúl Cubina, Jon Bellion, Jorgen Odegard, and was produced by the latter alongside Ojivolta and 24. The song is an electropop, pop rock and pop song with synth-pop elements and an EDM-inspired beat, complemented by a simple guitar. The track features wispy, melodic verses accompanied by "breathy" vocals, chorus that boasts the dance-pop punch, angelic bridge, and Rosé's high note at the end. The track sees Rosé reflecting on her life as a global K-pop superstar and she realises what really matters in her life already lies within herself. She created the single's name herself and considers it to be the most successful line in all the songs that she has ever sung. It means that everything that the singer needs is here, "on earth," and there is no need to rush somewhere to find this necessary. In terms of musical notation, the song is composed in the key of C♯ major, with a tempo of 189 beats per minute, and runs for two minutes and forty-eight seconds.

Basically the song is kind of about looking for answers in life, for a purpose in life, and I feel like people, especially these days, can relate to it. Sometimes when you’re always kind of on that roll, you kind of forget to take care of what actually matters to you most, and it’s just a song that says that everything we need is already within us. There’s no need to go out and look for it.

— Rosé on the song's meaning.

== Critical reception ==
Professional ratings
Review scores
Source	Rating
IZM	3/5 stars
NME	4/5 stars

Following the release of "On the Ground", it was met with generally positive reviews from music critics. Writing for The Line of Best Fit, Otis Robinson positively commented on the track's escapist nature in the wake of the COVID-19 pandemic, dubbing it as a "sing-into-the-hairbrush, clutch-the-heart anthem" that deserves its Guinness World Record. Ashlee Mitchell from MTV noted that "On the Ground" provides "the perfect contrast, taking a more confident stance, reminding listeners of the importance of being true to yourself." Writing for Beats Per Minute, JT Early described the song as a "feel-good song about realising what’s important." Madison Murray of Young Hollywood described the song as an "empowering anthem about Rosé’s experience in the spotlight and how she learned her true inner strength." Writing for NME, Rhian Daly described the song as a "breezy, EDM-infused pop song". Jo Ji-Hyun of IZM gave the song a three-star rating, praising its "soft and strong message" and noting Rosé's vocals for "creat[ing] a higher level of completeness." Divyansha Dongre from Rolling Stone India described "On the Ground" as "an electric pop anthem with a catchy guitar riff and picturesque set designs." Alice Bailey, reviewer of the French fashion magazine Elle, called the song "a moving, beautiful, and lyrically-deep lead single." Anna Chan from Billboard described it as "an empowering and thoughtful song about finding purpose within yourself."

=== Year-end lists ===
Billboard ranked the song at number 39 in their list of 50 Best Songs of 2021 So Far, calling it an "infinitely hummable tune [that] is perfect for dancing around in your living room or belting out in the shower — alone". Tamar Herman of South China Morning Post selected "On the Ground" as one of the 10 best songs of 2021, writing: "The Blackpink vocalist’s first solo project starts off promising to be an introspective acoustic pop song, then turns into a reflective electric track that illustrates Rosé’s clean vocals."

"On the Ground" on listicles
Critic/Publication	List	Rank	Ref.
Billboard	The 50 Best Songs of 2021 So Far: Staff Picks	39	
Billboard	25 Best K-Pop Songs of 2021: Critics’ Picks	25	
Cosmopolitan	The 55 Best New Songs of 2021	34	
Marie Claire	The 20 Best New K-Pop Songs of 2021	—N/a	
NME	The 25 best K-Pop songs of 2021	23	
SCMP	Best K-pop songs of 2021 so far	—N/a	
SCMP	The 20 best K-pop songs of 2021	19	
Teen Vogue	The 54 Best K-Pop Songs of 2021	—N/a	
The Line of Best Fit	The Best Songs of 2021 Ranked	23	

== Commercial performance ==
"On the Ground" debuted at number one on both the Billboard Global 200 and the Global Excl. U.S. charts with 92.1 million global streams and 29,000 global downloads sold, the first song by a K-pop solo artist to do so in the charts' histories. The song charted on the Global 200 for seven weeks and the Global Excl. U.S. for nine weeks, becoming the longest-charting song by a K-pop soloist at the time. In South Korea, "On the Ground" debuted at number fifteen on the Gaon Digital Chart on the eleventh issued week (March 7–13), with less than two days of tracking. The following week, the song entered the top ten with "Gone" and peaked at number four, marking her first top-ten solo entries in the country. The song also managed to peak at number one in Singapore and Malaysia.

In the United States, the song debuted and peaked at number 70 on the US Billboard Hot 100, surpassing CL's "Lifted" (2016) to become the highest-charting release at the time by a female K-pop soloist. It also marked the second-highest peak for a K-pop soloist in Hot 100 history, only behind Psy's "Gangnam Style" (2012). The song collected 6.4 million streams, 0.3 million radio impressions, and 7,500 digital sales in its first week. In the United Kingdom, "On the Ground" debuted and peaked at number 43 on the UK Singles Chart, becoming the first song by a K-pop female solo artist to enter the chart in history. It earned 90,000 UK chart units as of October 2024, the fourth-most for any Blackpink member's solo single after Jennie's "One of the Girls" (2023), Lisa's "Money" (2021), and Jennie's "Solo" (2018). In Australia, the song peaked at number 31 on the ARIA Singles Chart, becoming Rosé's first entry as a solo artist. In New Zealand, the song landed at number 15 on the Top 20 New Zealand Singles chart, which ranks the 20 best-performing songs in the country by New Zealand artists, and number three on the Hot 40 Singles chart, which ranks the 40 fastest-moving tracks in the country. Similarly, the song peaked at number 49 on the Irish Singles Chart. In Canada, "On the Ground" arrived at number 35 on the Canadian Hot 100, becoming the first top-40 hit by a Korean female solo artist in the country.

== Music video ==
=== Background ===
An accompanying music video for the song was directed by Han Sa-min and uploaded to Blackpink's official YouTube channel in conjunction with the release of the single album. After twelve hours, the music video reached 23 million views, making it the fastest music video by a soloist to reach 20 million views in the history of K-pop at the time. When the video premiered at 12:00AM EST, it garnered over 1.2 million peak concurrent viewers. With 41.6 million views within 24 hours, "On the Ground" gained the title at the time of the most-viewed Korean music video by a soloist in 24 hours on YouTube, breaking the almost eight-year record held by Psy with his song "Gentleman". The music video became the fastest to hit 100 million views for a female solo artist, doing so in seven days after release. The music video surpassed 200 million views on 13 July 2021. The behind the scenes video was uploaded a day after the release of the music video on March 13, 2021. A dance practice video was uploaded on March 23. In it, the singer is accompanied by background dancers who are all dressed in the same all-black outfit. Its dance was choreographed by Kiel Tutin and Kyle Hanagami.

A scene in "On the Ground" music video, where the singer is accompanied by six clones of Rosé standing on the stone stairs with the inscription "Roses are Dead, Love is Fake."

=== Synopsis ===
The video begins with a comet falling from the sky. Then Rosé is shown sitting in a bedroom, when a chandelier falls from the ceiling. The next scene features Rosé leaving a theatre dressed in a black bodysuit with a long, feathery train, large black puffer sleeves and knee-high boots. The singer is then shown running in a feathery bodysuit and a ruffled mini skirt, while electric fuses go on in the background. Next, the singer is seen wearing a ruched lavender ballgown and cream-coloured fur jacket while sitting in the back of a car and looking dreamily out the car window. Later in the video the singer is shown all in black accompanied by six Rosé clones wearing white dresses. They stand on a stone staircase with a sign that reads "Roses are Dead, Love is Fake." Then the music video shows Rosé in her childhood home, admiring her pre-fame self Roseanne in a softy cropped cardigan, denim cut-off shorts, and a t-shirt, playing piano. As the song closes, the singer is wearing a pink ruffled dress, while floating in a field of flowers. At the end, the singer is shown posing with a burning limousine in the background.

== Live performances ==
On 14 March 2021, Rosé performed "Gone" and "On the Ground" for the first time live on SBS's Inkigayo. On 16 March Rosé performed the single on The Tonight Show Starring Jimmy Fallon, marking her first solo performance on American television. In the performance Rosé is seen in a black-and-white clip that found her singing while running through elaborate choreography with an array of back-up dancers. On 18 March, she performed "On the Ground" on Mnet's M Countdown. The singer performed the song on Show! Music Core on 20 March. The song was performed again on Inkigayo on March 21. On 27 March, Rosé performed the song on Show! Music Core. On 28 March, the singer performed "On the Ground" on Inkigayo. On 30 March, Rosé performed "On the Ground" on Japanese channel Nippon TV's morning show Sukkiri. Rosé performed "On the Ground" as part of her solo stage during Blackpink's Born Pink World Tour starting in October 2022. In April 2023, she performed the song during Blackpink's set as the headlining act of the Coachella Valley Music and Arts Festival. On 2 July 2023, she also performed the song during Blackpink's set as the headlining act of BST Hyde Park in London.

== Accolades ==
Awards and nominations for "On the Ground"
Year	Organisation	Award	Result	Ref.
2021	Asian Pop Music Awards	Best Music Video (Overseas)	Won	
2021	Asian Pop Music Awards	Top 20 Songs of the Year (Overseas)	Won	
2021	Asian Pop Music Awards	Record of the Year (Overseas)	Nominated	
2021	Melon Music Awards	Song of the Year	Nominated	
2021	Mnet Asian Music Awards	Best Dance Performance Solo	Won	
2021	Mnet Asian Music Awards	Song of the Year	Nominated	
2022	Gaon Chart Music Awards	Artist of the Year – Digital Music (March)	Nominated	
2022	Golden Disc Awards	Best Digital Song (Bonsang)	Nominated	
2022	Joox Thailand Music Awards	Korean Song of the Year	Nominated	
2022	RTHK International Pop Poll Awards	Top Ten International Gold Songs	Won	

Key
†	Indicates a formerly held world record

World records for "On the Ground"
Year	Organisation	Award	Ref.
2021	Guinness World Records	First artist to reach number one on a Billboard Global chart as a soloist and as part of a group	
2021	Guinness World Records	† Most viewed YouTube music video in 24 hours by a solo K-pop artist	

Music program awards (6 total)
Program	Date	Ref.
Show Champion	24 March 2021	
M Countdown	25 March 2021	
M Countdown	8 April 2021	
Music Bank	26 March 2021	
Show! Music Core	27 March 2021	
Inkigayo	28 March 2021	

== Cover versions ==
On 11 May 2021, Brie Larson posted her acoustic rendition of the singer's single on both her social media accounts, alongside a caption that read: "A little ROSÉ magic for you". Rosé showed her appreciation via her Instagram Stories, adding a heart emoji above the video.

== Credits and personnel ==
Credits adapted from the liner notes of R.

Recording

- Recorded at The Black Label Studio (Seoul)
- Mastered at Sterling Sound (New York City)

Personnel

- Rosé – vocals, songwriter
- Amy Allen – songwriter
- Jon Bellion – songwriter
- Jorgen Odegard – songwriter, producer
- Raúl Cubina – songwriter
- Teddy – songwriter, producer
- Ojivolta – producer
- 24 – producer
- Yongin Choi – recording engineer
- Josh Gudwin – mixing engineer
- Randy Merrill – mastering engineer

== Charts ==
=== Weekly charts ===
Weekly chart performance
Chart (2021–24)	Peak position
Australia (ARIA)	31
Belgium (Ultratip Bubbling Under Flanders)	42
Canada Hot 100 (Billboard)	35
Euro Digital Song Sales (Billboard)	14
France (SNEP)	196
Global 200 (Billboard)	1
Hungary (Single Top 40)	6
Ireland (IRMA)	49
Japan Hot 100 (Billboard)	50
Lithuania (AGATA)	46
Malaysia (RIM)	1
Mexico Airplay (Billboard)	46
New Zealand Aotearoa Singles (RMNZ)	15
New Zealand Hot Singles (RMNZ)	3
Portugal (AFP)	88
Singapore (RIAS)	1
South Korea (Gaon)	4
South Korea (K-pop 100)	3
UK Singles (Official Charts)	43
US Billboard Hot 100	70
Vietnam (Vietnam Hot 100)	43

=== Monthly charts ===
Monthly chart performance
Chart (2021)	Peak position
South Korea (Gaon)	5
South Korea (K-pop 100)	4

=== Year-end charts ===
Year-end chart performance
Chart (2021)	Position
South Korea (Gaon)	44

== Certifications ==
Certifications
Region	Certification	Certified units/sales
Brazil (Pro-Música Brasil)	Platinum	40,000^{‡}
New Zealand (RMNZ)	Gold	15,000^{‡}
^{‡} Sales+streaming figures based on certification alone.

== Release history ==
Release formats for "On the Ground"
Region	Date	Format	Label	Ref.
Various	12 March 2021	Digital download; streaming	YG; Interscope	
Australia	19 March 2021	Contemporary hit radio	Universal	

== See also ==
- List of Billboard Global 200 number ones of 2021
- List of Inkigayo Chart winners (2021)
- List of K-pop songs on the Billboard charts
- List of M Countdown Chart winners (2021)
- List of Music Bank Chart winners (2021)
- List of Show Champion Chart winners (2021)
- List of Show! Music Core Chart winners (2021)
- List of number-one songs of 2021 (Malaysia)
- List of number-one songs of 2021 (Singapore)
