= List of number-one songs of 2021 (Malaysia) =

Below is a list of songs that topped the RIM charts in 2021 according to the Recording Industry Association of Malaysia.

== Chart history ==
Issue Date	International & Domestic songs			Domestic songs		
Issue Date	Song	Artist(s)	Ref.	Song	Artist(s)	Ref.
7 January	"At My Worst"	Pink Sweat$		"Pulang"	K-Clique featuring AJ	
14 January	"Drivers License"	Olivia Rodrigo		"Mimpi"	Haqiem Rusli	
21 January	"Drivers License"	Olivia Rodrigo		"Mimpi"	Haqiem Rusli	
28 January	"Drivers License"	Olivia Rodrigo		"Mimpi"	Haqiem Rusli	
4 February	"Drivers License"	Olivia Rodrigo		"Mimpi"	Haqiem Rusli	
11 February	"Drivers License"	Olivia Rodrigo		"Mimpi"	Haqiem Rusli	
18 February	"Love Story (Taylor's Version)"	Taylor Swift		"Mimpi"	Haqiem Rusli	
25 February	"Heartbreak Anniversary"	Giveon		"Mimpi"	Haqiem Rusli	
4 March	"Heartbreak Anniversary"	Giveon		"Mimpi"	Haqiem Rusli	
11 March	"Heartbreak Anniversary"	Giveon		"Mimpi"	Haqiem Rusli	
18 March	"Gone"	Rosé		"Gila"	Kaka Azraff, Noki & Loca B	
25 March	"On the Ground"	Rosé		"Gila"	Kaka Azraff, Noki & Loca B	
1 April	"Leave the Door Open"	Silk Sonic (Bruno Mars & Anderson .Paak) (Note: Silk Sonic is a duo consisting of American singers Bruno Mars and Anderson .Paak, both of whom are also credited individually for the song on the RIM charts.)		"Gila"	Kaka Azraff, Noki & Loca B	
8 April	"Leave the Door Open"	Silk Sonic (Bruno Mars & Anderson .Paak)		"Mimpi"	Haqiem Rusli	
15 April	"Leave the Door Open"	Silk Sonic (Bruno Mars & Anderson .Paak)		"Mimpi"	Haqiem Rusli	
22 April	"Leave the Door Open"	Silk Sonic (Bruno Mars & Anderson .Paak)		"Mimpi"	Haqiem Rusli	
29 April	"Save Your Tears"	The Weeknd		"Mimpi"	Haqiem Rusli	
6 May	"Leave the Door Open"	Silk Sonic (Bruno Mars & Anderson .Paak)		"Suasana Hari Raya"	Anuar & Ellina	
13 May	"Leave the Door Open"	Silk Sonic (Bruno Mars & Anderson .Paak)		"Suasana Hari Raya"	Anuar & Ellina	
20 May	"Kiss Me More"	Doja Cat ft. SZA		"Mimpi"	Haqiem Rusli	
27 May	"Butter"	BTS		"Mimpi"	Haqiem Rusli	
3 June	"Butter"	BTS		"Mimpi"	Haqiem Rusli	
10 June	"Butter"	BTS		"Mimpi"	Haqiem Rusli	
17 June	"Butter"	BTS		"Semalam"	Aina Abdul	
24 June	"Butter"	BTS		"Mimpi"	Haqiem Rusli	
1 July	"Butter"	BTS		"Kucu Kuca"	Lia Aziz	
8 July	"Butter"	BTS		"Kucu Kuca"	Lia Aziz	
15 July	"Permission to Dance"	BTS		"Kucu Kuca"	Lia Aziz	
22 July	"Permission to Dance"	BTS		"Takbir Raya"	Rabbani	
29 July	"Permission to Dance"	BTS		"Kucu Kuca"	Lia Aziz	
5 August	"Stay"	The Kid Laroi & Justin Bieber		"Purnama"	Naim Daniel	
12 August	"Stay"	The Kid Laroi & Justin Bieber		"Kesetiaan"	Siti Sarah	
19 August	"Stay"	The Kid Laroi & Justin Bieber		"Kesetiaan"	Siti Sarah	
26 August	"Stay"	The Kid Laroi & Justin Bieber		"Kesetiaan"	Siti Sarah	
2 September	"Butter"	BTS		"Kesetiaan"	Siti Sarah	
9 September	"Stay"	The Kid Laroi & Justin Bieber		"Tak Sangka"	Yonnyboii, Zynakal & Asyraf Nasir	
16 September	"Lalisa"	Lisa		"Tak Sangka"	Yonnyboii, Zynakal & Asyraf Nasir	
23 September	"Only"	Lee Hi		"Tak Sangka"	Yonnyboii, Zynakal & Asyraf Nasir	
30 September	"My Universe"	Coldplay & BTS		"Tak Sangka"	Yonnyboii, Zynakal & Asyraf Nasir	
7 October	"Only"	Lee Hi		"Tak Sangka"	Yonnyboii, Zynakal & Asyraf Nasir	
14 October	"Money"	Lisa		"Tak Sangka"	Yonnyboii, Zynakal & Asyraf Nasir	
21 October	"Easy on Me"	Adele		"Tak Sangka"	Yonnyboii, Zynakal & Asyraf Nasir	
28 October	"Easy on Me"	Adele		"Tak Sangka"	Yonnyboii, Zynakal & Asyraf Nasir	
4 November	"Easy on Me"	Adele		"Malam Semakin Dingin"	Tajul & Afieq Shazwan	
11 November	"Easy on Me"	Adele		"Malam Semakin Dingin"	Tajul & Afieq Shazwan	
18 November	"All Too Well (Taylor's Version)"	Taylor Swift		"Malam Semakin Dingin"	Tajul & Afieq Shazwan	
25 November	"Easy on Me"	Adele		"Malam Semakin Dingin"	Tajul & Afieq Shazwan	
2 December	"Easy on Me"	Adele		"Malam Semakin Dingin"	Tajul & Afieq Shazwan	
9 December	"Easy on Me"	Adele		"Malam Semakin Dingin"	Tajul & Afieq Shazwan	
16 December	"Easy on Me"	Adele		"Janji Manis"	Masdo	
23 December	"Easy on Me"	Adele		"Janji Manis"	Masdo	
30 December	"Easy on Me"	Adele		"Janji Manis"	Masdo	
