= 2021 Nickelodeon Meus Prêmios Nick =

2021 Brazilian award show

2021 Meus Prêmios Nick
- Date: September 28, 2021
- Location: São Paulo
- Country: Brazil
- Hosted by: Bianca Andrade and Fred
- Most awards: BTS (5)
- Most nominations: BTS (5)
- Website: meuspremiosnick.com.br

Television/radio coverage
- Network: Nickelodeon

The 2021 Meus Prêmios Nick Awards took place on September 28, 2021, in São Paulo, Brazil via Nickeldoeon. As in the previous year the awards were held virtually and were hosted by the internet personalities Bianca Andrade and Fred. The ceremony, in addition to being broadcast on the channel, was broadcast live on YouTube and Facebook.

== Winners and nominees ==
On August 2, the pre-nominees were announced and voting to elect the nominees began until August 19. As of the aforementioned date, the voting to elect the winners began and will end on September 12. South Korean group BTS is the most nominated act of this edition with 5 nominations.

Indicates the winner within each category.

Female TV Artist	Male TV Artist
Tatá Werneck; Flavia Pavanelli; Ísis Valverde; Maisa	Celso Portiolli; Tiago Leifert; Igor Jansen; Rafael Portugal
Favorite Nick Show	Favorite Brazilian TV Show
Bob Esponja; Danger Force; The Loud House; Club 57	Domingo Legal; DPA; Eliana; Programa da Maisa
Favorite Cartoon	Movie of the Year
Miraculous: As Aventuras da Ladybug; Bob Esponja; My Little Pony; Irmão do Jorel	Kally's Mashup: Um aniversário muito Kally!; Luca; Cruella; Pai em Dobro
Fashion Icon	Inspiration of the Year
Manu Gavassi; Juliette; Iza; Jordanna Maia	Rayssa Leal; Maju Coutinho; Gloria Groove; Pequena Lo
Favorite Ship	Revelation Idol
Manu Gavassi e Jullio Reis; Fefe e Walker; Zé Felipe e Virgínia; Maria Clara Garcia e Lucas Abreu	Vittor Fernando; Maria Clara Garcia; Fefe; Vivi
Challenger of the Year	Coolest YouTuber
Vittor Fernando; Peixinho; Vanessa Lopes; Virgínia	uJoãozinho; Enaldinho; Planeta das Gêmeas; Luiza Parente
Brilliant Creator	Gamer MVP
Juliette; Any Gabrielly; Pietro Guedes; Luiza Parente	Babi; Malena; Nobru; Tazer Craft
InstaPets	Favorite Music Artist
Plínio – Anitta; Mia – Bruna Marquezine; Pudim – Marcos Mion; Gisele Pincher – Luísa Sonza	Manu Gavassi; Iza; Zé Felipe; Anitta
Fandom of the Year	Favorite National Hit
Army (BTS); Uniters (Now United); Cactos (Juliette); Blinks (Blackpink)	"Girl from Rio" – Anitta; "Ainda Vem Que Chegou" – Vitor Kley; "Morena" – Luan Santana; "Eu Feat. Você" – Melim
Favorite International Hit	Challenge Hits of the Year
"Butter" – BTS; "Love Shot" – Exo; "Lean On Me" – Now United; "Tan Enamorados" – CNCO	"Permission to Dance" – BTS; "Another One Bites the Dust" – Queen; "Good 4 U" – Olivia Rodrigo; "Liberdade (Quando o Grave Bate Forte)" – Alok, MC Don Juan & DJ GBR
Favorite Music Group	Video of the Year
BTS; Now United; Blackpink; CNCO	"Butter" – BTS; "Lean On Me" – Now United; "Good 4 U" – Olivia Rodrigo; "Willow" – Taylor Swift
