= List of number-one songs of 2021 (Singapore) =

This is a list of the Singapore Top 30 Digital Streaming number-one songs in 2021, according to the Recording Industry Association Singapore.

== Chart history ==
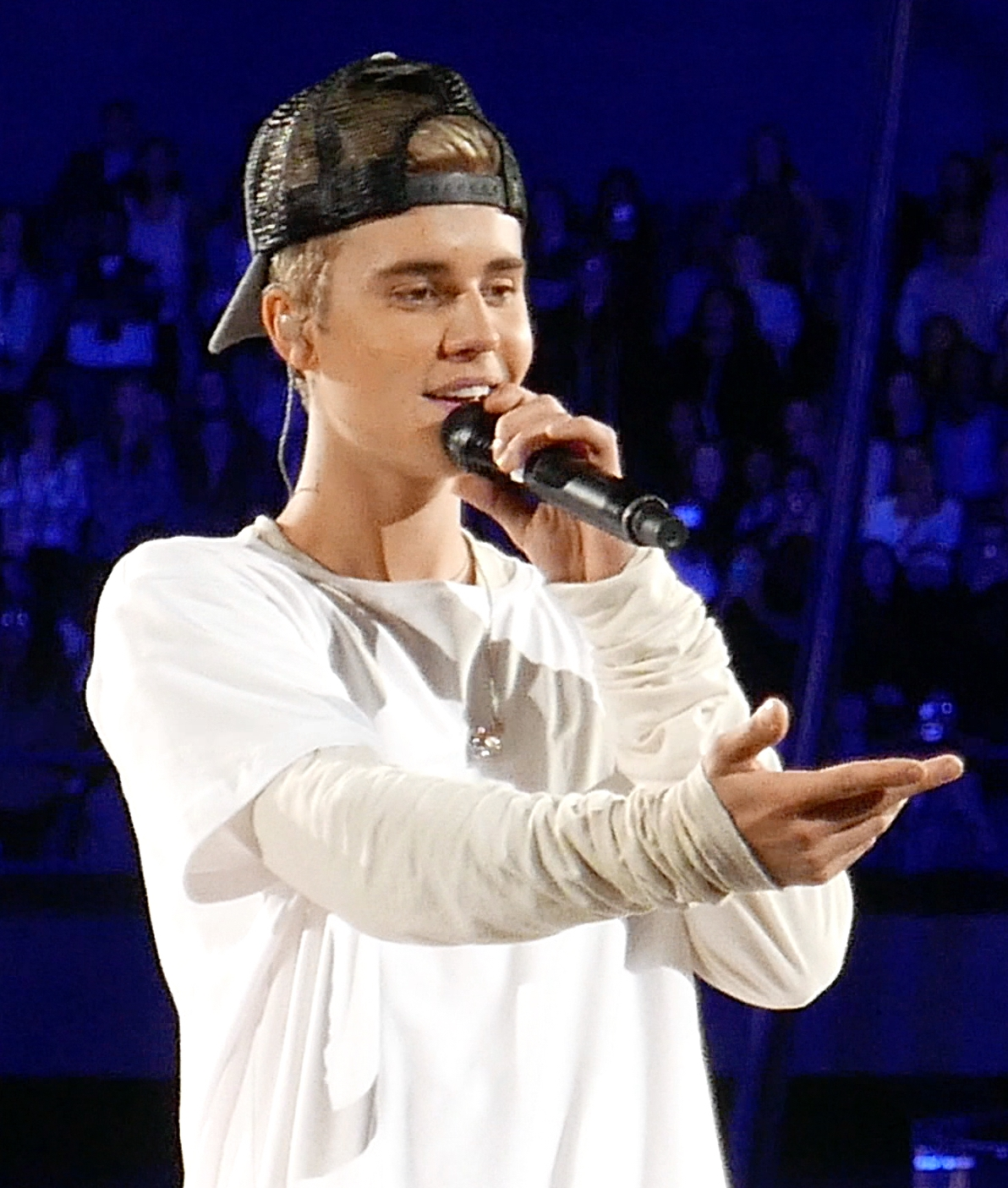
Justin Bieber earned the most weeks at number one in 2021, topping the chart for 17 weeks with "Peaches" and "Stay".

The Kid Laroi topped the chart for 13 weeks with "Stay", the longest-running number-one song of the year.

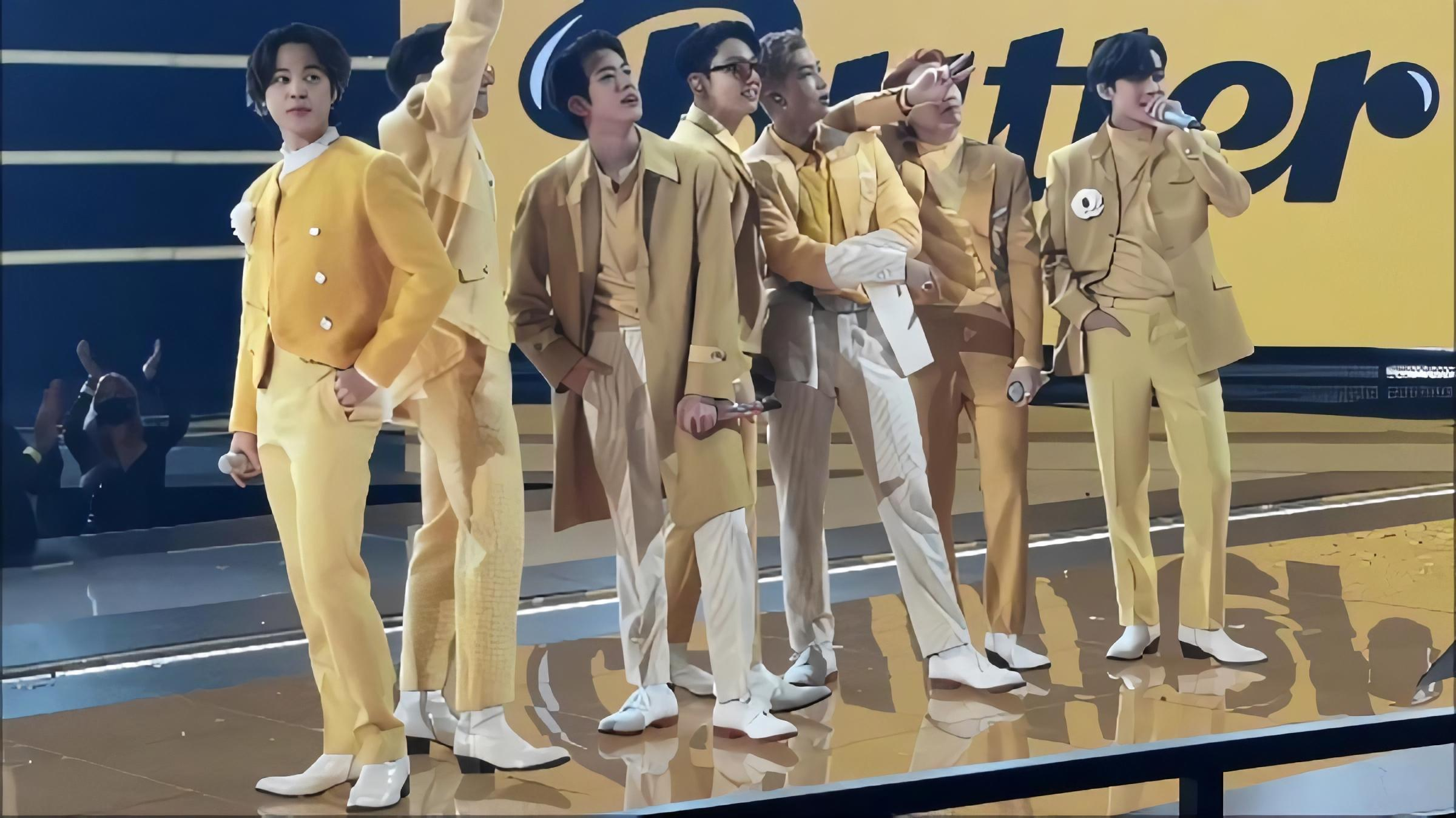
BTS earned the most number-one songs by any artist in 2021, topping the chart for 10 weeks with "Butter", "Permission to Dance", and "My Universe".

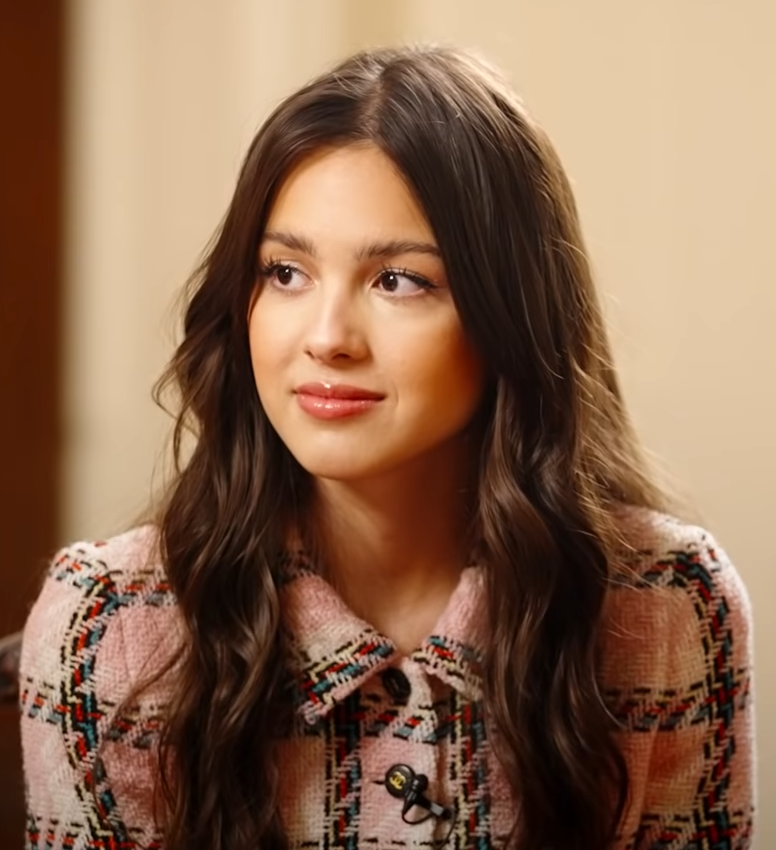
Olivia Rodrigo topped the chart for 8 weeks with "Drivers License" and "Good 4 U".

Issue Date	Song	Artist(s)	Ref.
7 January	"Your Name Engraved Herein"	Crowd Lu	
14 January	"Drivers License"	Olivia Rodrigo	
21 January	"Drivers License"	Olivia Rodrigo	
28 January	"Drivers License"	Olivia Rodrigo	
4 February	"Drivers License"	Olivia Rodrigo	
11 February	"Drivers License"	Olivia Rodrigo	
18 February	"Drivers License"	Olivia Rodrigo	
25 February	"Drivers License"	Olivia Rodrigo	
4 March	"Heartbreak Anniversary"	Giveon	
11 March	"Heartbreak Anniversary"	Giveon	
18 March	"On the Ground"	Rosé	
25 March	"On the Ground"	Rosé	
1 April	"Peaches"	Justin Bieber featuring Daniel Caesar & Giveon	
8 April	"Peaches"	Justin Bieber featuring Daniel Caesar & Giveon	
15 April	"Peaches"	Justin Bieber featuring Daniel Caesar & Giveon	
22 April	"Peaches"	Justin Bieber featuring Daniel Caesar & Giveon	
29 April	"Save Your Tears"	The Weeknd	
6 May	"Save Your Tears"	The Weeknd	
13 May	"Kiss Me More"	Doja Cat featuring SZA	
20 May	"Good 4 U"	Olivia Rodrigo	
27 May	"Butter"	BTS	
3 June	"Butter"	BTS	
10 June	"Butter"	BTS	
17 June	"Butter"	BTS	
24 June	"Butter"	BTS	
1 July	"Butter"	BTS	
8 July	"Butter"	BTS	
15 July	"Permission to Dance"	BTS	
22 July	"Permission to Dance"	BTS	
29 July	"Stay"	The Kid Laroi and Justin Bieber	
5 August	"Stay"	The Kid Laroi and Justin Bieber	
12 August	"Stay"	The Kid Laroi and Justin Bieber	
19 August	"Stay"	The Kid Laroi and Justin Bieber	
26 August	"Stay"	The Kid Laroi and Justin Bieber	
2 September	"Stay"	The Kid Laroi and Justin Bieber	
9 September	"Stay"	The Kid Laroi and Justin Bieber	
16 September	"Stay"	The Kid Laroi and Justin Bieber	
23 September	"Stay"	The Kid Laroi and Justin Bieber	
30 September	"My Universe"	Coldplay and BTS	
7 October	"Stay"	The Kid Laroi and Justin Bieber	
14 October	"Stay"	The Kid Laroi and Justin Bieber	
21 October	"Easy on Me"	Adele	
28 October	"Easy on Me"	Adele	
4 November	"Easy on Me"	Adele	
11 November	"Easy on Me"	Adele	
18 November	"All Too Well"	Taylor Swift	
25 November	"All Too Well"	Taylor Swift	
2 December	"All Too Well"	Taylor Swift	
9 December	"All Too Well"	Taylor Swift	
16 December	"All Too Well"	Taylor Swift	
23 December	"Ghost"	Justin Bieber	
30 December	"Ghost"	Justin Bieber	

== Number-one artists ==
List of number-one artists by total weeks at number one
Position	Artist	Weeks at No. 1
1	Justin Bieber	17
2	The Kid Laroi	11
3	BTS	10
4	Olivia Rodrigo	8
5	Giveon	6
6	Taylor Swift	5
7	Daniel Caesar	4
7	Adele	4
8	Rosé	2
8	The Weeknd	2
9	Crowd Lu	1
9	Doja Cat	1
9	SZA	1
9	Coldplay	1
