= R (single album) =

- Digital and standard digipak cover

Single album by Rosé
- Released: 12 March 2021
- Recorded: 2019–2020
- Studio: The Black Label (Seoul)
- Genre: Pop
- Length: 6:15
- Labels: YG; Interscope
- Producers: Teddy; 24; Jorgen Odegard; Ojivolta; Jon Bellion; Brian Lee

Rosé chronology
R (2021)	Rosie (2024)

Vinyl LP cover

Singles from R
- 1. "On the Ground" Released: 12 March 2021; 2. "Gone" Released: 4 April 2021

R is the debut single album by New Zealand and South Korean singer Rosé. It was released on 12 March 2021 through YG Entertainment and Interscope Records. The single album was produced by Teddy, 24, Jorgen Odegard, Ojivolta, Jon Bellion and Brian Lee, and was recorded from 2019 to 2020 at The Black Label, based in Seoul. R is primarily a pop record with influences of synth-pop, dance-pop, electropop, EDM, alternative rock, soft rock, indie rock and rock elements.

R debuted at number two on the Gaon Album Chart and became the best-selling album by a female soloist in the chart's history. R also set the record for the highest first-week sales by a female K-pop soloist with 448,089 copies sold, before her bandmate Lisa broke the record. It was certified double platinum by the Korea Music Content Association (KMCA) in November 2021 for selling 500,000 copies, and was later certified triple platinum in December 2023 for selling 750,000 copies. R also charted in Croatia, Japan, and the United Kingdom. The single album was met with positive reviews centring on Rosé's vocals and songwriting.

"On the Ground" was released as the lead single on the same day the album was released. The single peaked at number four on South Korea's Gaon Digital Chart and number 70 on the US Billboard Hot 100, becoming the highest-charting song by a female K-pop soloist in the United States in 2021. The song also debuted and peaked at number one on both the Global 200 and Global Excl. U.S. charts, the first song by a solo K-pop artist to do so in the charts' histories. The music video for "Gone" was released on 4 April 2021, and the single peaked at number six in South Korea, earning Rosé her second top-ten hit in the country.

== Background ==
On 1 June 2020, it was announced that Rosé would make her solo debut in 2020, following the release of Blackpink's first Korean language full-length album. On 30 December 2020, in an interview with South Korean media outlet Osen, Rosé revealed that filming for her debut music video would begin in mid-January 2021. On 25 January 2021, a 33-second teaser titled "Coming Soon" was uploaded to Blackpink's official YouTube channel and featured Rosé singing a snippet of an unknown track. Rosé's label YG Entertainment disclosed that she had "completed all filming for her solo album title track's music video in mid-January", and the release will be "surely different from Blackpink's usual musical style".

Soon thereafter, it was announced that Rosé will be showcasing the track featured in the teaser, later given the title "Gone", at Blackpink's first virtual concert, The Show, on 31 January 2021. On 2 March 2021, it was officially announced that Rosé will debut her highly anticipated solo project on 12 March, making her the second Blackpink member to release a solo work since Jennie's "Solo" in November 2018. The next day, new teaser poster unveiled the name of the lead single, "On the Ground", for the first time. The first music video teaser for "On The Ground" was released on 7 March. On 8 March, YG revealed the album track listing, which confirmed first-time songwriting contributions from Rosé on both tracks. On 9 March, the second music video teaser for the title track was published.

== Composition ==
"I'm sure that every song has a language that suits it best. I debated a lot about what language would suit the title track, and it turned out, it was English. In truth, I was worried that fans might be disappointed with English lyrics, but I also felt that it was important to present them with a completed song, the best song that I could be satisfied with."

— Rosé on the English lyrics of R, NME

Musically, R is primarily a pop record with influences of synth-pop, dance-pop, electropop, EDM, alternative rock, soft rock, indie rock and rock elements. The single album is 6 minutes and 15 seconds long and features two songs. NME observed that "Rosé takes things back to basics, decluttering the often busy layers found on her group’s songs to just what’s needed and employing a quieter, softer approach". At an online press conference, Rosé said that she had a lot of input while making her debut solo project, from the cover art to songwriting. "Since our fans have waited for it for such a long time, I wanted it to be satisfying," she said. "I attended a lot of meetings to convey my opinions for the album, from its cover design to my first songwriting experience. " She added that she reminisced on her pre-debut days and passion for music while making the record. "I reflected on myself and realised how much I love music, get comforted and have grown with it. I wrote the songs in English as I thought it was the most fitting language for them. I hope they can comfort listeners as well."

The singer also revealed that she had originally recorded "Gone" for the first time two years ago. Meanwhile, "On the Ground" was "only recorded recently". When speaking to Nylon Magazine, Rosé admitted that R was her chance to experiment vocally. She stated, "Since this is my solo debut, I wanted to try out different sounds and different vocal techniques. I tried some new things. I think you’ll get to see a new musical side of me."

=== Songs ===
The single album opens with "On the Ground", an electropop, pop rock and pop song with synth-pop elements and an EDM-inspired beat, complemented by a simple guitar. The track features wispy, melodic verses accompanied by "breathy" vocals, angelic bridge, chorus that boasts the dance-pop punch and Rosé's high note at the end. The track sees Rosé reflecting on her life as a global K-pop superstar and she realises what really matters in her life already lies within herself. In an interview with StyleCaster, the singer spoke candidly about the personal inspiration behind the track. She explained, "From when I was a trainee, I lived day to day, running towards my dreams. Once in a while, there are moments where I’d question my motives, and I think the lyrics express this really well. I think this is something to learn from as well." True to her roots, "On the Ground" is a homage to her youth. A love letter to her time as a young girl spending hours playing instruments with big dreams of sharing her art with the world. The second track, "Gone" is a soft rock and indie rock ballad underlaid with an electric guitar. Pertaining to a mellow vibe, the production of the song features a "stripped-back" sound and built around strummed guitar chords. The track is a heartfelt break-up song about someone who still has feelings for their ex who moved on. Rosé's smooth voice evokes a palpable, but relatable, sense of heartbreak.

== Conception and title ==
According to a press statement, the album's title "symbolises not only the first letter of Rosé's name, but also a new beginning for her as a solo artist". "Many people call me by many names, so 'R' comes from the first letter of my names, and it represents my start of going solo," she stated during a global press conference. "Rather than the alphabet letter 'r' defining me as a person, I hope people will be reminded of 'R' the first thing when they see me." "On the Ground" is about a long and difficult journey to success and the pursuit of a dream. In the song, Rosé tells about simple things, which are much more important in life, family, friends, health, and personal happiness, and not the criteria of success, which everyone likes to boast of. In "Gone", Rosé sings about the difficult love that finally left her and about her broken heart. According to her, when recording each of the songs, she plays one or another character. Here, as she says, she just managed to be herself.

After the performance at Inkigayo, the singer said that "On the Ground" was created for those "who are in search of the meaning of life and answers to key questions", to show that “the answer is already inside, in the soul, and none should not look for it somewhere else". Rosé created the single's name herself and considers it to be the most successful line in all the songs that she has ever sung. It means that everything that Rosé needs is here, "on earth," and there is no need to rush somewhere to find this necessary.

== Release and promotion ==
On 2 March 2021, YG Entertainment uploaded a teaser poster with the single album's name, also announcing the release date. Pre-orders for the album began on 4 March. The following day, Rosé teased the title of the album's lead single "On the Ground" on social media. On 8 March, YG posted the album's track list. R was released worldwide on 12 March through YG and Interscope in conjunction with the music video for "On the Ground". In celebration of her comeback, the singer held an online live broadcast an hour before the release to talk about the album and music video, as well as unbox the physical album. On 14 March, the singer appeared on the show My Little Old Boy as a special guest. On 20 March 2021, Rosé appeared on the South Korean TV show Knowing Bros along with Hyeri from Girl's Day. The singer gave an interview to The Kelly Clarkson Show and Apple Music's New Music Daily hosted by Zane Lowe. She also appeared on the magazine cover of Vogue Australia's April issue.

=== Singles ===
"On the Ground" was released as the lead single of R, alongside the album itself, on 12 March 2021. The song was accompanied with a music video directed by Han Sa-min. Upon release, the music video surpassed 41.6 million views in 24 hours and broke the record of former labelmate Psy's "Gentleman" for the most viewed South Korean music video of a soloist in 24 hours. In the United States, the song debuted and peaked at number 70 on the US Billboard Hot 100, becoming the highest-charting song by a Korean female soloist in the United States. It also debuted and peaked at number one on both the Global 200 and on Global Excl. U.S. charts, the first to do so in the charts' histories.

"Gone" was released as the second single on 5 April 2021, alongside the release of its music video. The music video garnered over 15 million views in its first 24 hours. In the United States, the song debuted at number 15 on the Billboard Digital Song Sales chart. The song also debuted and peaked at number 29 on the Global 200 with 19.6 million streams and 25,000 downloads worldwide, and at number 17 on the Global Excl. U.S. chart.

=== Live performances ===
On 31 January 2021 the singer performed "Gone" at Blackpink's first virtual concert, The Show. On 14 March 2021, Rosé made the debut performormance of "On the Ground" and "Gone" on SBS' Inkigayo. On 16 March 2021, Rosé performed the lead single on The Tonight Show Starring Jimmy Fallon. On 18 March 2021, she performed "On the Ground" on Mnet's M Countdown, where she also ranked second place in the voting section of the show. The singer performed the song on Show! Music Core on 20 March. The song was performed again on Inkigayo on 21 March. On 27 March, Rosé performed the song on Show! Music Core. On 28 March, the singer performed "On the Ground" on Inkigayo.

== Critical reception ==
Professional ratings
Review scores
Source	Rating
NME	4/5 stars

R received positive reviews from music critics, who praised its emotional weight and Rosé's songwriting. Rhian Daly of NME, awarded the album 4 out of 5 stars, describing the album as "a no-frills testament that proves a powerful voice and good songwriting don’t need to be big or ostentatious to shine." Writing for Beats Per Minute, JT Early gave the single album a positive review, stating that R is "a vulnerable and mature solo debut that demonstrates Rosé’s vocals and songwriting skills greatly." Seung Hoon Lee, a journalist for Osen, considered R as a successful debut and stated that Rosé's performance was more mature than on the Blackpink's debut album.

== Awards and nominations ==
Awards and nominations for R
Year	Organisation	Award	Result	Ref.
2021	Asian Pop Music Awards	Top 20 Albums of the Year (Overseas)	Won	
2021	Asian Pop Music Awards	People's Choice Award (Overseas)	2nd place	
2022	Gaon Chart Music Awards	Artist of the Year – Physical Album (2nd Quarter)	Nominated	
2022	Seoul Music Awards	Main Award (Bonsang)	Nominated	

== Commercial performance ==
Rosé's debut single album surpassed 400,000 preorders within four days, making it the best-selling single album by a Korean female solo artist. By 15 March, R had surpassed half a million stock pre-orders. Of the 500,000 preorders, 400,000 came from CDs, 48,000 came from the kit, and 52,000 coming from the vinyl sales. According to Korea's Hanteo Chart, the album sold 280,000 copies on the first day and 448,089 copies on the first week of release, setting the record for the highest first-week sales among female solo artists. On 23 April 2021, YG Entertainment announced that the single album sold 502,447 on Hanteo, making Rosé the first Korean female soloist to breach the half-million sales mark in 19 years. The physical edition debuted at number two on the Gaon Album Chart, whilst the kit debuted at number seven. The album also debuted at number three on the monthly Gaon Album Chart, selling 394,156 copies as well as 52,158 copies of the kit version in the month of March. In May 2021, R was certified platinum by the Korea Music Content Association (KMCA) for selling over 250,000 copies, and in November 2021 it was certified double platinum for selling over 500,000 copies. The album ranked at number 25 on the year-end Gaon Album Chart with 516,915 copies sold in 2021. In December 2023, it was certified triple platinum for selling over 750,000 copies.

== Track listing ==
R
No.	Title	Lyrics	Music	Producer(s)	Length
1.	"On the Ground"	Rosé; Amy Allen	Jon Bellion; Jorgen Odegard; Raúl Cubina; Teddy	Odegard; Ojivolta; Teddy; Bellion; 24	2:48
2.	"Gone"	Rosé; J. Lauryn	Rosé; Brian Lee; J. Lauryn; Teddy	24; Lee	3:27
Total length:					6:15

R – CD only (bonus tracks)
No.	Title	Music	Producer(s)	Length
3.	"On the Ground" (Instrumental)	Bellion; Odegard; Cubina; Teddy	Odegard; Ojivolta; Teddy; Bellion; 24	2:48
4.	"Gone" (Instrumental)	Rosé; Lee; Lauryn; Teddy	24; Lee	3:27
Total length:				12:30

== Personnel ==
Credits adapted from album liner notes.

=== Production ===
- Rosé – vocals, creative director, songwriter (all tracks)
- Teddy – creative director, songwriter (all tracks), producer (track 1)
- Amy Allen – songwriter (track 1)
- Jon Bellion – songwriter (track 1), producer (track 1)
- Jorgen Odegard – songwriter (track 1), producer (track 1)
- Raúl Cubina – songwriter (track 1)
- Ojivolta – producer (track 1)
- 24 – producer (all tracks)
- Brian Lee – songwriter (track 2), producer (track 2)
- J. Lauryn – songwriter (track 2)
- Yongin Choi – recording engineer (all tracks)
- Josh Gudwin – mix engineer (all tracks)
- Randy Merrill – mastering engineer (all tracks)

=== Design ===
- Rosé; Hyona Park, Jeongyoon Yoon (Franchise); Hyo Jin Jeong, Sung Min Yook, Min Kyu Lee, Hee Won Moon, Min Ji Lee – design
- Jae Hyun Choe, Jae Hoon Roh, Bin Seo – production coordinator
- Heejune Kim, Jungwook Mook, Sunjae Shin, Khan, Jaewon Choi – photograph
- Na Kyung Lee, Si Chun Kim, Yea Byul Jeon, Bo Yung Jung, Jin Kwang Yu – set design
- Min Hee Park – stylist
- Seon Yeong Lee – hair
- Myung Sun Lee (Woosun) – make up
- Eunkyung Park (Unistella) – nail
- Young Shin Kim – florist

=== Management ===
- YG Entertainment – executive producer
- Yea Deun Kim, Euna Ahn, Jiwan Seong – A&R
- Yoohee Chung, Soon Mo Hwang, Hana Kim, Sejung Ku, Gyeo Re Shin, Seogyeong Shin, Meenseo Won, Minji Yang – artist strategy
- Yoon Jeong Kim – publishing
- Heon Pyo Park – head of artist management group
- Heon Pyo Park, Byoung Young Lee, Se Ho Kim, Eun Gon Kim, Ho Sup Shin, Jong Seong Park, Sae Rom Lee, Seong In Je – artist management
- Sung Jun Choi – chief operating officer
- Seon Young Kang, Yu Jin Jung, Eun Yu Choi – music business
- Bo Kyung Hwang – executive supervisor

== Charts ==
=== Weekly charts ===
Weekly chart performance for R
Chart (2021–2023)	Peak position
Croatian International Albums (HDU)	10
Japan Combined Singles (Oricon)	40
South Korean Albums (Gaon)	2
South Korean Albums (Gaon) Kit version	7
South Korean Albums (Gaon) LP version	7
UK Physical Singles (OCC)	4

=== Monthly charts ===
Monthly chart performance for R
Chart (2021)	Peak position
South Korean Albums (Gaon)	3
South Korean Albums (Gaon) Kit version	12
South Korean Albums (Gaon) LP version	25

=== Year-end charts ===
Year-end chart performance for R
Chart (2021)	Position
South Korean Albums (Gaon)	25

== Certifications and sales ==
Certifications for R
Region	Certification	Certified units/sales
South Korea (KMCA)	3× Platinum	1,027,898

== Release history ==
Release dates and formats for R
Region	Date	Format	Label	Ref.
Various	12 March 2021	Digital download; streaming	YG; Interscope	
Various	16 March 2021	CD	YG; Interscope	
South Korea	19 April 2021	Vinyl LP	YG; Interscope	

== See also ==
- List of certified albums in South Korea
