= Recording Industry Association Singapore =

Music industry association in Singapore

- Abbreviation: RIAS
- Formation: 1976; 50 years ago
- Type: Music industry association
- Members: 24 (2020)
- Website: www.rias.org.sg
- Formerly called: Singapore Phonogram Videogram Association

Recording Industry Association Singapore (RIAS) is an organisation that represents the music industry in Singapore and national representative of the International Federation of the Phonographic Industry. The organisation was founded in 1976 as the Singapore Phonogram Videogram Association (SPVA) and renamed in 2001.

== Sales certificates ==
RIAS awards certificates for music records in Singapore based on sales. The requirements from album awards varied over the years, while the requirements for singles stayed constant. The levels are:

Albums
Thresholds	Until October 2007	Until December 2009	Since December 2009
Gold	7,500	6,000	5,000
Platinum	15,000	12,000	10,000

Singles
Thresholds	Sales units
Gold	5,000
Platinum	10,000

As of 2021, RIAS also accepts digital sales. Singles are certified on full unit basis, while albums are certified on revenue bases, with award levels of US$50,000 for Gold and US$100,000 for Platinum.

== Charts ==
As of January 2025, RIAS runs the following weekly charts:

- The Official Singapore Chart
- The Official Singapore Regional Chart

=== Number-one songs ===
The first number-one song of the RIAS Charts was "Perfect" by Ed Sheeran on January 4, 2018. No charts were released between March 28 and June 28, 2019. As of the issue for the week ending July 1, 2021, the RIAS Charts has had 52 different number-one songs.

- List of number-one songs of 2018 (Singapore)
- List of number-one songs of 2019 (Singapore)
- List of number-one songs of 2020 (Singapore)
- List of number-one songs of 2021 (Singapore)
- List of number-one songs of 2022 (Singapore)
- List of number-one songs of 2023 (Singapore)
- List of number-one songs of 2024 (Singapore)
- List of number-one songs of 2025 (Singapore)
- List of number-one songs of 2026 (Singapore)

=== Song milestones ===
==== Most weeks at number one ====
No. of weeks	Song	Artist	Release year
22	"Golden"	Huntrix	2025
18	"Seven"	Jung Kook featuring Latto	2023
15	"Apt."	Rosé and Bruno Mars	2024
15	"Hate That I Made You Love Me"	Ariana Grande	2026
14	"Cupid"	Fifty Fifty	2023
13	"Señorita"	Shawn Mendes and Camila Cabello	2019
13	"Ghost"	Justin Bieber	2021
13	"Jumping Machine" (跳楼机)	LBI	2025
11	"Stay"	The Kid Laroi and Justin Bieber	2021
11	"Die with a Smile"	Lady Gaga and Bruno Mars	2024
10	Glimpse of Us"	Joji	2022
9	Memories"	Maroon 5	2019
9	"Dance Monkey"	Tones and I	2019
9	"As It Was"	Harry Styles	2022
9	"Don't Say You Love Me"	Jin	2025
8	"Thank U, Next"	Ariana Grande	2018
8	"How You Like That"	Blackpink	2020

=== Artist milestones ===
==== Most number-one songs ====
No. of songs	Artist
10	Ariana Grande
8	Blackpink
8	BTS
7	Taylor Swift
6	Justin Bieber
4	The Weeknd
3	Coldplay
3	SZA
3	NewJeans
3	Jung Kook
3	Lady Gaga
3	Bruno Mars
3	Olivia Rodrigo

==== Most weeks at number one ====
No. of weeks	Artist
43	Ariana Grande
34	Justin Bieber
31	BTS
29	Bruno Mars
27	Taylor Swift
24	Blackpink
22	Huntrix
20	Jung Kook
18	Latto
17	Rosé
14	Fifty Fifty

== Album milestones ==
=== Most weeks at number one ===
Weeks	Album	Artist	Year(s)	Ref.
6	I Deserved	Sammi Cheng	1999	
