= LBI (singer) =

Chinese musician

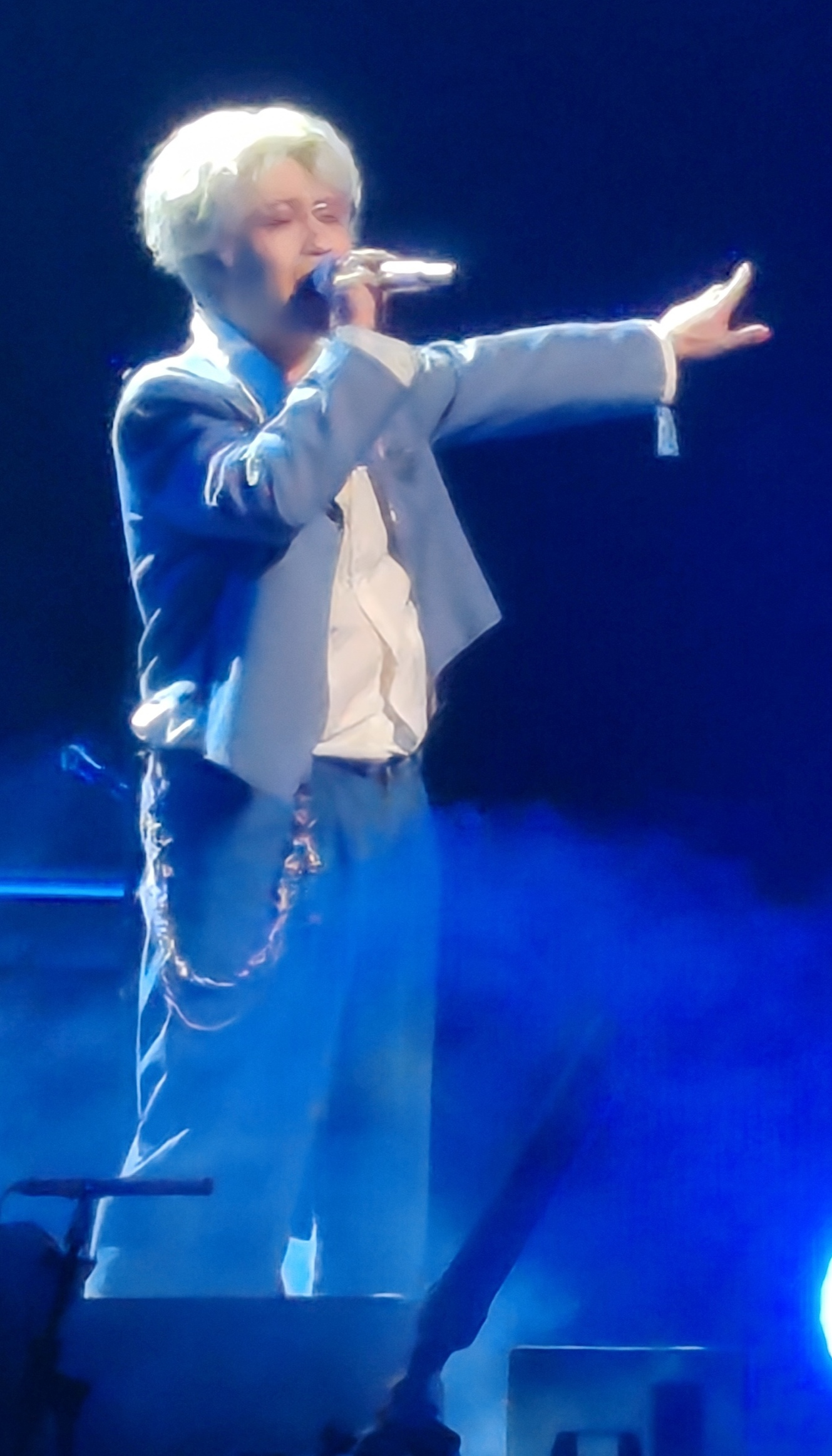
- LBI performing in The Star, Singapore

Background information
- Born: Shi Bo Chen; 19 November 1994 (age 31)
- Origin: China
- Genres: Mandopop, Pop music, Hip hop music, R&B
- Occupations: Singer-songwriter, music producer
- Years active: 2018–present (as a singer)
- Label: BeiJingGuoRanLeDong Culture Company

LBI (Chinese: 利比; pinyin: Lìbǐ; born 19 November 1994), born Shi Bo Chen (时柏尘), is a Chinese Mandopop singer-songwriter and music producer. He gained significant recognition for his songs, particularly through platforms like Douyin, after primarily working as a music producer. He is known for blending pop and hip-hop elements.

== Career ==
LBI's career began in music production.

His transition to a performing artist in mainland China saw a significant surge in popularity, largely propelled by his participation in Douyin's "See Music Project" in 2022 with the song "Maybe" (或许).

LBI officially debuted as a recording artist c. 2021 with singles like "Los Angeles" (洛杉矶). His 2022 single "Xiao Cheng Xia Tian" (小城夏天, lit. 'Summer in a Small Town') became one of the best-selling albums in China.

In 2025, he released the EP Jumping Machine (跳楼机), the title track of which he also performed live on the music variety show The Sound of Heavenly Gifts 6 (天赐的声音6). "Jumping Machine" received over 50 million plays on Spotify as of May 2025, earning approximately CN¥ 40 million since its release in November 2024. His songs are published under the music label BeiJingGuoRanLeDong Culture Company.

== Musical style ==
LBI's music is predominantly categorized as Mandopop, incorporating elements of pop, hip-hop, and R&B. His songs are often described as being tailored to a mass audience. He frequently employs storytelling in his lyrics.

== Discography ==
=== EPs ===
- Jumping Machine (跳楼机) (2025)
