= Kang Daniel discography =

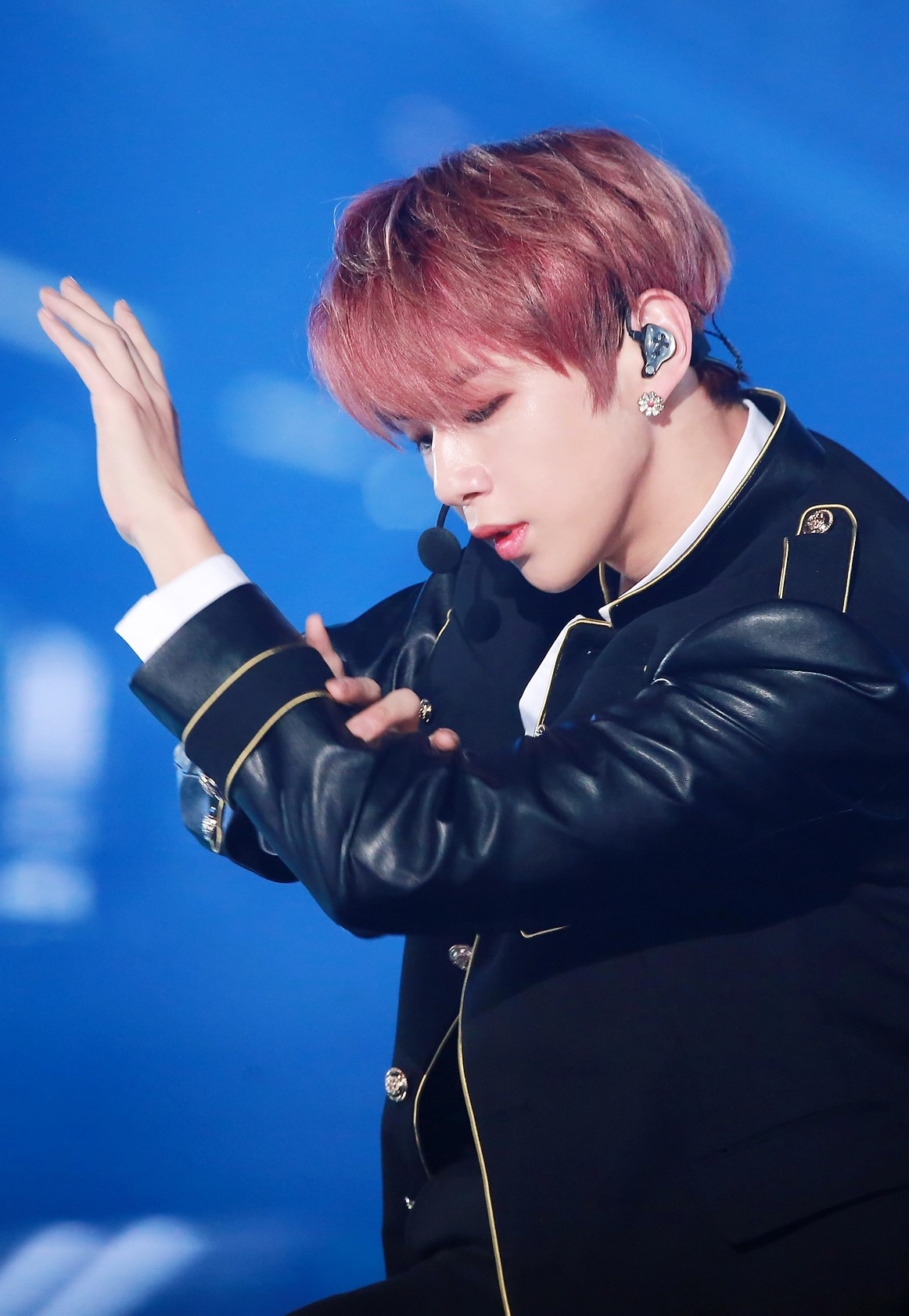
- Kang Daniel performing during the 2018 Melon Music Awards
- Studio albums: 1
- EPs: 10
- Singles: 35
- Music videos: 36
- Reissues: 1

South Korean singer and songwriter Kang Daniel has released one studio album (which was reissued under a different title), ten extended plays (EPs)—seven of which were Korean, two of which were Japanese, and one in English—and more than 30 singles (including two features, six promotional singles, and four soundtrack appearances). As of August 2023, Kang has sold 2 million albums as a solo artist and an additional 4.2 million as a part of Wanna One.

Following the end of Wanna One's activities as a group, Kang released his first solo EP, Color on Me, in July 2019 under his newly formed one-man agency Konnect Entertainment. The EP debuted at number one on South Korea's Gaon Album Chart and entered Japan's Oricon Albums Chart at number 23. It also broke two records selling over 500,000 physical copies within the first month of its release. In March 2020, Kang released his second EP, Cyan, as the first installment of his "color trilogy" project. It peaked atop South Korea's Gaon Album Chart with its lead single "2U" giving Kang his first top ten track in Korea, which peaked at number seven on the Gaon Digital Chart. His third EP, Magenta, was released in August 2020 and served as the second installment of his three-part color series. The digital single "Paranoia", released in February 2021, marked Kang's first solo appearance on Billboard's World Digital Song Sales chart with the single debuting at number five. It also gave Kang his first top five track in Korea, which peaked at number two on the Gaon Digital Chart. In April 2021, Kang released his fourth overall EP, Yellow, as the final installment of his three-part project aimed to find his true colors as a solo artist. It peaked atop South Korea's Gaon Album Chart with its lead single "Antidote" giving Kang his first number one track on South Korea's Gaon Digital Chart.

== Studio albums ==
List of studio albums, with selected chart positions, sales, and certifications
Title	Details	Peak chart positions	Sales
Title	Details	KOR	Sales
The Story	Released: May 24, 2022 (KOR); Label: Konnect Entertainment; Formats: CD, digital download, streaming	3	KOR: 323,671

=== Reissues ===
List of reissues, with selected chart positions, sales, and certifications
Title	Details	Peak chart positions	Sales
Title	Details	KOR	Sales
The Story: Retold	Released: November 24, 2022 (KOR); Label: Konnect Entertainment; Formats: CD, digital download, streaming	2	KOR: 95,651

== Extended plays ==
=== Korean ===
List of extended plays, with selected chart positions, sales, and certifications
Title	Details	Peak chart positions		Sales	Certifications
Title	Details	KOR	JPN	Sales	Certifications
Color on Me	Released: July 25, 2019 (KOR); Label: Konnect Entertainment; Formats: CD, digital download, streaming	1	23	KOR: 500,134; JPN: 2,767	KMCA: 2× Platinum
Cyan	Released: March 24, 2020 (KOR); Label: Konnect Entertainment; Formats: CD, digital download, streaming	1	—	KOR: 266,176	KMCA: Platinum
Magenta	Released: August 3, 2020 (KOR); Label: Konnect Entertainment; Formats: CD, digital download, streaming	1	94	KOR: 337,785; JPN: 384	KMCA: Platinum
Yellow	Released: April 13, 2021 (KOR); Label: Konnect Entertainment; Formats: CD, digital download, streaming	1	136	KOR: 320,114; JPN: 329	KMCA: Platinum
Realiez	Released: June 19, 2023 (KOR); Label: Konnect Entertainment; Formats: CD, digital download, streaming	5	—	KOR: 169,996	
Act	Released: September 23, 2024 (KOR); Label: ARA Inc.; Formats: CD, digital download, streaming	8	—	KOR: 120,188	
Glow to Haze	Released: June 16, 2025 (KOR); Label: ARA Inc.; Formats: CD, digital download, streaming	2	—	KOR: 104,928	
"—" denotes releases that did not chart or were not released in that region.

=== Japanese ===
List of extended plays, with selected chart positions, sales, and certifications
Title	Details	Peak chart positions	Sales
Title	Details	JPN	Sales
Joy Ride	Released: October 5, 2022 (JPN); Label: Warner Music Japan; Formats: CD, digital download, streaming	15	JPN: 2,968
Re8el	Released: November 29, 2023 (JPN); Label: Warner Music Japan; Formats: CD, digital download, streaming	10	
"—" denotes releases that did not chart or were not released in that region.

=== English ===
List of extended plays, with selected chart positions, sales, and certifications
Title	Details	Peak chart positions	Sales
Title	Details	KOR	Sales
Pulsephase	Released: December 12, 2025 (Note: A limited number of physical copies was released on December 29, 2025.); Label: ARA Inc.; Formats: CD, digital download, streaming	5	KOR: 12,500

== Singles ==
=== As lead artist ===
List of singles, with selected chart positions
Title	Year	Peak chart positions			Album
Title	Year	KOR	KOR Hot	US World	Album
"What Are You Up To" (뭐해)	2019	15	1	—	Color on Me
"Touchin'"	2019	71	—	—	Cyan
"2U"	2020	7	81	—	Cyan
"Waves" (featuring Simon Dominic and Jamie)	2020	102	92	—	Magenta
"Who U Are" (깨워)	2020	12	80	—	Magenta
"Paranoia"	2021	2	39	5	Yellow
"Antidote"	2021	1	56	21	Yellow
"Upside Down"	2022	2	—	—	The Story
"Nirvana" (featuring pH-1 and WDBZ)	2022	92	—	—	The Story: Retold
"SOS"	2023	65	—	—	Realiez
"Electric Shock"	2024	16	—	—	Act
"Episode"	2025	14	—	—	Glow to Haze
Japanese
"TPIR" (featuring Miyavi)	2022	—	—	—	Joy Ride
"Joy Ride"	2022	—	—	—	Joy Ride
"Supernova" (Japanese version)	2023	—	—	—	Re8el
"Re8el"	2023	— (Note: "Re8el" did not enter the Circle Digital Chart, but peaked at number 167 on the Download Chart.)	—	—	Re8el
"Watercolor" (水彩 수채화) (featuring Tomioka Ai)	2025	— (Note: "Watercolor" did not enter the Circle Digital Chart, but peaked at number 55 on the Download Chart.)	—	—	Non-album single
English
"Look Where We Are" (with 220 Kid and Willim)	2023	— (Note: "Look Where We Are" did not enter the Circle Digital Chart, but peaked at number 83 and 122 on the Download Chart and BGM Chart, respectively.)	—	—	Non-album single
"Wasteland"	2023	— (Note: "Wasteland" did not enter the Circle Digital Chart, but peaked at number 14 on the Download Chart.)	—	—	Realiez
"Mess"	2025	175	—	—	Non-album single
"No Day"	2025	— (Note: "No Day" did not enter the Circle Digital Chart, but peaked at number 58 on the Download Chart.)	—	—	Non-album single
"Backseat Promises"	2025	— (Note: "Backseat Promises" did not enter the Circle Digital Chart, but peaked at number 5 on the Download Chart.)	—	—	Pulsephase
"Stay"	2026	— (Note: "Stay" did not enter the Circle Digital Chart, but peaked at number 22 on the Download Chart.)	—	—	Non-album single
"—" denotes releases that did not chart or were not released in that region.

=== As featured artist ===
List of features, with selected chart positions
Title	Year	Peak chart position	Album
Title	Year	KOR	Album
"State of Wonder" (Inverness featuring Anthony Russo and Kang Daniel)	2021	— (Note: "State of Wonder" did not enter the Gaon Digital Chart, but peaked at number 137 on the Gaon Download Chart.)	Monstercat Instinct Vol. 7
Japanese
"Hush Hush" (Miyavi featuring Kang Daniel)	2021	— (Note: "Hush Hush" did not enter the Gaon Digital Chart, but peaked at number 195 on the Gaon Download Chart.)	Imaginary
"—" denotes releases that did not chart or were not released in that region.

=== Promotional ===
List of promotional singles, with selected chart positions
Title	Year	Peak chart positions		Album
Title	Year	KOR	KOR Hot	Album
"Refresh" (with Zico)	2020	113	77	For the Love of Korea
"Outerspace" (featuring Loco)	2021	80	—	Non-album single
"Fly" (with Chancellor)	2021	— (Note: "Fly" did not enter the Gaon Digital Chart, but peaked at number 25 on the Gaon Download Chart.)	—	Cyworld BGM 2021
"Ready to Ride"	2022	— (Note: "Ready to Ride" did not enter the Gaon Digital Chart, but peaked at number 27 and 54 on the Download Chart and BGM Chart, respectively.)	—	Non-album single
"Move like This" (with An Yujin featuring Yuna Kim)	2022	— (Note: "Move like This" did not enter the Gaon Digital Chart, but peaked at number 25 and 38 on the Download Chart and BGM Chart, respectively.)	—	Non-album single
"Obsession (情結)" (Note: Korean remake)	2026	— (Note: "Obsession (情結)" did not enter the Circle Digital Chart, but peaked at number 66 on the Download Chart.)	—	Non-album single
"—" denotes releases that did not chart or were not released in that region.

=== Soundtrack appearances ===
List of soundtrack appearances, with selected chart positions
Title	Year	Peak chart position	Album
Title	Year	KOR	Album
"Something"	2020	— (Note: "Something" did not enter the Gaon Digital Chart, but peaked at number 14 and 16 on the Gaon BGM Chart and the Gaon Download Chart, respectively.)	Backstreet Rookie OST Part 1
"Hush Hush (Korean Ver.)" (featuring Miyavi)	2022	— (Note: "Hush Hush (Korean Ver.)" did not enter the Gaon Digital Chart, but peaked at number 30 and 50 on the Gaon Download Chart and the Gaon BGM Chart, respectively.)	Rookie Cops OST Special
"Remember Us"	2022	— (Note: "Remember Us" did not enter the Gaon Digital Chart, but peaked at number 89 and 147 on the Gaon Download Chart and the Gaon BGM Chart, respectively.)	Street Man Fighter OST Vol.2
"Last Forever"	2022	— (Note: "Last Forever" did not enter the Gaon Digital Chart, but peaked at number 31 and 60 on the Gaon BGM Chart and the Gaon Download Chart, respectively.)	Work Later, Drink Now 2 OST Part 2
"—" denotes releases that did not chart or were not released in that region.

== Other charted songs ==
List of other charted songs, with selected chart positions
Title	Year	Peak chart positions		Album
Title	Year	KOR	KOR Hot	Album
"Color"	2019	111	3	Color on Me
"I Hope"	2019	110	2	Color on Me
"Horizon"	2019	127	—	Color on Me
"Intro (Through the Night)"	2019	139	—	Color on Me
"Runaway" (featuring Yumdda)	2020	— (Note: "Runaway" did not enter the Gaon Digital Chart, but peaked at number 25 and 62 on the Gaon Download Chart and the Gaon BGM Chart, respectively.)	94	Magenta
"Flash"	2020	— (Note: "Flash" did not enter the Gaon Digital Chart, but peaked at number 24 and 51 on the Gaon Download Chart and the Gaon BGM Chart, respectively.)	95	Magenta
"Movie" (featuring Dvwn)	2020	— (Note: "Movie" did not enter the Gaon Digital Chart, but peaked at number 29 and 63 on the Gaon Download Chart and the Gaon BGM Chart, respectively.)	96	Magenta
"Night" (밤)	2020	— (Note: "Night" (밤) did not enter the Gaon Digital Chart, but peaked at number 27 and 58 on the Gaon Download Chart and the Gaon BGM Chart, respectively.)	97	Magenta
"—" denotes releases that did not chart or were not released in that region.

== Songwriting credits ==
All credits are adapted from the Korea Music Copyright Association, unless otherwise referenced.

List of songs written or co-written, year released, artist, and album name
Title	Year	Artist	Album	Credited
"Kangaroo"	2018	Wanna One	1÷x=1 (Undivided)	Yes
"Color"	2019	Kang Daniel	Color on Me	Yes
"What Are You Up To" (뭐해)	2019	Kang Daniel	Color on Me	Yes
"Horizon"	2019	Kang Daniel	Color on Me	Yes
"I Hope"	2019	Kang Daniel	Color on Me	Yes
"Adulthood"	2019	Kang Daniel	Cyan	Yes
"Flash"	2020	Kang Daniel	Magenta	Yes
"Waves" (featuring Simon Dominic and Jamie)	2020	Kang Daniel	Magenta	Yes
"Who U Are" (깨워)	2020	Kang Daniel	Magenta	Yes
"Runaway" (featuring Yumdda)	2020	Kang Daniel	Magenta	Yes
"Movie" (featuring Dvwn)	2020	Kang Daniel	Magenta	Yes
"State of Wonder" (featuring Anthony Russo and Kang Daniel)	2021	Inverness	Monstercat Instinct Vol. 7	Yes
"Paranoia"	2021	Kang Daniel	Yellow	Yes
"Digital"	2021	Kang Daniel	Yellow	Yes
"Misunderstood" (featuring Omega Sapien)	2021	Kang Daniel	Yellow	Yes
"Antidote"	2021	Kang Daniel	Yellow	Yes
"Save U" (featuring Wonstein)	2021	Kang Daniel	Yellow	Yes
"Hush Hush" (featuring Kang Daniel)	2021	Miyavi	Imaginary	Yes
"Hush Hush (Korean Ver.)" (featuring Miyavi)	2022	Kang Daniel	Rookie Cops OST Special	Yes
"Ready to Ride"	2022	Kang Daniel	Non-album single	Yes
"The Story"	2022	Kang Daniel	The Story	Yes
"Upside Down"	2022	Kang Daniel	The Story	Yes
"Loser" (featuring Dbo)	2022	Kang Daniel	The Story	Yes
"Parade"	2022	Kang Daniel	The Story	Yes
"Don't Tell" (featuring Jessi)	2022	Kang Daniel	The Story	Yes
"Ride 4 U"	2022	Kang Daniel	The Story	Yes
"How We Live" (featuring sokodomo)	2022	Kang Daniel	The Story	Yes
"Mad" (featuring Chancellor)	2022	Kang Daniel	The Story	Yes
"1000x"	2022	Kang Daniel	The Story	Yes
"Moment"	2022	Kang Daniel	The Story	Yes
"Remember Us"	2022	Kang Daniel	Street Man Fighter OST Vol.2	Yes
"Nirvana" (featuring pH-1 and WDBZ)	2022	Kang Daniel	The Story: Retold	Yes
"Ghost"	2022	Kang Daniel	The Story: Retold	Yes
"Ride 4 U (Remix)"	2022	Kang Daniel	The Story: Retold	Yes
"Nirvana (Solo Ver.)"	2022	Kang Daniel	The Story: Retold	Yes
"Wasteland"	2023	Kang Daniel	Realiez	Yes
"SOS"	2023	Kang Daniel	Realiez	Yes
"Supernova (Japanese Version)"	2023	Kang Daniel	Re8el	Yes
"SOS (Japanese Version)"	2023	Kang Daniel	Re8el	Yes
"Losing Myself"	2024	Kang Daniel	Act	Yes
"Get Loose"	2024	Kang Daniel	Act	Yes
"Electric Shock"	2024	Kang Daniel	Act	Yes
"Come Back to Me" (featuring Chungha)	2024	Kang Daniel	Act	Yes
"9 Lives"	2024	Kang Daniel	Act	Yes
"Betcho Love"	2024	Kang Daniel	Act	Yes
"Mess"	2025	Kang Daniel	Non-album single	Yes
"Little Bit Lost"	2025	Kang Daniel	Glow to Haze	Yes
"Movie Star"	2025	Kang Daniel	Glow to Haze	Yes
"Episode"	2025	Kang Daniel	Glow to Haze	Yes
"Love Game"	2025	Kang Daniel	Glow to Haze	Yes
"No Day"	2025	Kang Daniel	Non-album single	Yes
"Sol Chegar" (featuring Kang Daniel and Biblein)	2025	Codemtc	Non-album single	Yes
"Watercolor" (水彩 수채화) (featuring Tomioka Ai)	2025	Kang Daniel	Non-album single	Yes
"Backseat Promises"	2025	Kang Daniel	Pulsephase	Yes
"Uplift"	2025	Kang Daniel	Pulsephase	Yes
"That's Enough to Go"	2025	Kang Daniel	Pulsephase	Yes
"Back to You"	2025	Kang Daniel	Pulsephase	Yes
"The Chase"	2025	Kang Daniel	Pulsephase	Yes
"Na Madrugada"	2025	Happy Been	Non-album single	Yes
"Obsession (情結)"	2026	Kang Daniel	Non-album single	Yes
"Stay"	2026	Kang Daniel	Non-album single	Yes
