= Joy Ride (EP) =

- Digital cover

EP by Kang Daniel
- Released: October 5, 2022
- Genre: J-pop
- Length: 18:49
- Language: Japanese; English
- Label: Warner Japan

Kang Daniel chronology
The Story (2022)	Joy Ride (2022)	Realiez (2023)

Kang Daniel Japanese chronology
Joy Ride (2022)	Re8el (2023)

Singles from Joy Ride
- 1. "TPIR" Released: August 17, 2022; 2. "Joy Ride" Released: October 5, 2022

Music video
- "TPIR" on YouTube "Joy Ride" on YouTube

Joy Ride is the debut Japanese-language EP (fifth overall) by South Korean singer and songwriter Kang Daniel. It was released on October 5, 2022 by Warner Music Japan. Joy Ride contains four tracks, including the lead single of the same name, "TPIR" featuring Japanese singer Miyavi, and four songs from Kang's previous Korean album The Story re-recorded in Japanese.

== Background and release ==
On July 29, 2022, Konnect Entertainment announced that Kang Daniel had partnered with Warner Music Japan, and would be making his debut in the country that October. The EP's title and track listing were announced on the same day, with a pre-release single, "TPIR" featuring Japanese singer Miyavi, released on August 17. Along with "TPIR" and the eponymous title track, the EP contains four songs previously found on Kang's The Story (2022).

Joy Ride was released on October 5, 2022 along with the title track and its accompanying music video. In support of the EP, Kang embarked on his first Japanese tour, holding concerts in Osaka and Yokohama in October 2022.

== Commercial performance ==
Joy Ride debuted at number fifteen on Japan's Oricon Albums Chart for the week ending October 9, 2022, selling 2,968 copies in its first week.

== Track listing ==
Track listing and credits adapted from the EP's liner notes.

Joy Ride track listing
No.	Title	Lyrics	Producer(s)	Length
1.	"Joy Ride"	Colin Magalong; FOFU; Jackson Morgan; Loar; MZMC	MZMC; Pink Slip; Inverness	3:03
2.	"TPIR" (featuring Miyavi)	David Wilson; Gradon Jay Lee; Miyavi; MZMC; RiRia; Wyatt Sanders	Lee; MZMC; Sanders; Dwilly	3:37
3.	"Upside Down"	Canchild; Chancellor; Knave; MZMC	KillaGraham; MZMC	3:17
4.	"Loser" (featuring Chanmina)	Brian Lee; Canchild; Chancellor; Chanmina	Tushar Apte	3:12
5.	"Ride 4 U"	FOFU; Loar; MZMC	KillaGraham; MZMC	2:28
6.	"1000x"	Anthony Pavel; Anthony Russo; Canchild; Kaelyn Behr; MZMC	Styalz Fuego	3:10
Total length:				18:49

== Charts ==
Weekly chart performance for Joy Ride
Chart (2022)	Peak position
Japanese Albums (Oricon)	15

== Release history ==
Release date and formats for Joy Ride
Region	Date	Format	Label
Various	October 5, 2022	Digital download; streaming	Warner Japan
Japan	October 5, 2022	CD	Warner Japan
