= What Are You Up To =

2019 debut single by Kang Daniel

Single by Kang Daniel

from the album Color on Me
- Released: July 25, 2019
- Recorded: 2019
- Genre: K-pop
- Length: 3:02
- Label: Konnect; Sony Music
- Songwriters: Yorkie; Thama; Kang Daniel; Devine-Channel
- Producer: Devine-Channel

Kang Daniel singles chronology
"What Are You Up To" (2019)	"Touchin'" (2019)

Music video
- "What Are You Up To" on YouTube

"What Are You Up To" (Korean: 뭐해; RR: Mwohae; stylized "What are you up to") is a song by South Korean singer Kang Daniel. It was released on July 25, 2019 by Konnect Entertainment and distributed by Sony Music Korea. The song serves as the lead single from his debut EP Color on Me with lyrics co-written by Kang and resulted in his first music show win as a soloist on KBS2's Music Bank on August 9, 2019.

== Background ==
Shortly after Kang established his one-man agency Konnect Entertainment, Konnect confirmed on June 27 Kang finished recording songs for his debut EP and would finalize the title song and complete promotional content and choreography in preparation for a solo debut in late July. "What Are You Up To" was confirmed as the title track on July 19 and is said to be a trendy song as a gift to reward fans who have been waiting.

When asked during a Billboard interview why he did not pick a high-energy K-pop debut, Kang answered that "What Are You Up To" was selected because he wanted to do something he had not done before and wanted it to be different as his first title track as a solo artist. He expressed that it is a song that represents him well and shows what he can be capable of.

== Composition ==
"What Are You Up To" has a minimalist bell theme with 808 and synth sounds. At Kang's debut showcase, he stated that the title's phrase could come across as "strong, but also heartwarming" and described the song as having a bright synth sound with a hip-hop feel. The lyrics contain what he wanted to convey to fans and lingering experiences from everyday life, including instances of waiting for a delivery and small talk from family and friends he had not talked with in a while. Kang added, "Everyone has experiences with waiting for something."

== Music video ==
The music video for "What Are You Up To" was directed by VM Project Architecture and premiered on Konnect Entertainment's YouTube channel at 18:00 (KST) on July 25, 2019. It was preceded by a teaser featuring colorful sets and outfits released on the same platform on July 24. Throughout the music video, Kang is cut off from others but attempts to reach them through different means, such as a disconnected phone, loudspeaker, and typewriter. The video concludes with imagery of a small lit doorway amidst closed doors. International choreographer Antoine worked on the title song's choreography with Kang's team in three days, highlighting groove and rhythm. The music video exceeded 10 million views on August 2 within a week of the release and later won Best Music Video at the Melon Music Awards on November 30.

== Charts ==
Chart (2019)	Peak position
South Korea (Gaon)	15
South Korea (Kpop Hot 100)	1

== Accolades ==
Year	Award	Category	Result	Ref.
2019	Melon Music Awards	Best Music Video	Won	

=== Music program awards ===
Program	Date	Ref.
Music Bank (KBS2)	August 9, 2019	

== Release history ==
Region	Date	Format	Label
Various	July 25, 2019	Digital download; streaming	Konnect Entertainment; Sony Music

== See also ==
- List of K-pop Hot 100 number ones
- List of Music Bank Chart winners (2019)
