= Yellow (EP) =

EP by Kang Daniel
- Released: April 13, 2021
- Genre: K-pop
- Length: 17:00
- Language: Korean
- Label: Konnect; Sony Music

Kang Daniel chronology
Magenta (2020)	Yellow (2021)	The Story (2022)

Singles from Yellow
- 1. "Paranoia" Released: February 16, 2021; 2. "Antidote" Released: April 13, 2021

Yellow (stylized in all caps) is the fourth extended play (EP) by South Korean singer and songwriter Kang Daniel. It was released on April 13, 2021, by Konnect Entertainment and distributed by Sony Music Korea. Yellow contains five tracks with "Antidote" as its lead single.

"Paranoia" was pre-released on February 16. This album is the final installment in Kang's trilogy project aimed to find his colors as a solo artist. Cyan had a youthful pop vibe, whereas Magenta was dance-based and powerful. Yellow represents the different stages Kang went through during a darker period in his life when he lost but eventually found hope.

== Background and composition ==
On February 2, 2021, Konnect Entertainment posted a surprise comeback teaser video for what would be Kang Daniel's digital single prerelease "Paranoia", set for February 16. Kang, who penned the lyrics himself, drew inspiration from when he went on hiatus due to mental and physical health issues and expressed the pain and anguish he had experienced. The song combines synth bells, 808 bass, and electric guitar.

On March 18, Kang confirmed a follow-up comeback scheduled for April 13 with the release of his new album Yellow, promising tracks full of meaningful messages. The album's title track "Antidote" connects to the main story in "Paranoia" and is an alternative R&B song with rock elements. Kang is credited as the main lyricist in all of the album's songs. In contrast to the bright, positive image conventionally associated with the color yellow, Kang Daniel's yellow color represents warning, danger, and imperfect signals between green and red lights. Following the album's release, Kang explained the underlying story connecting the song tracks. Yellow captures the time when Kang was at his lowest point due to deteriorating health exacerbated by cyberbullying and chronicles his journey to recovery.

"The album starts off on a high note with 'Digital,' where I felt angry and motivated. Then [it] goes into songs like 'Paranoia' and 'Misunderstood,' that are more self-reflective and questioning. 'Antidote,' I felt like was my rock bottom, where I was just searching for an answer. The album ends with 'Save U,' which is a song I wrote for myself looking back at that time."

— Kang Daniel discussing Yellow

Revealing his reason for selecting a diamond as the cover art and the album cover's symbolism, Kang said "Depending on how much pressure is put on it, it becomes a diamond or stays a lump of coal. It's about the pressures put on me and where I am right now because of those pressures."

== Promotion ==
Kang and his manager appeared on the February 13 episode of Omniscient Interfering View and showed the making-of the "Paranoia" music video. On February 16, Kang held an online press conference to commemorate the single's release. He opened up further about his hiatus and retold other stories on Radio Star. Kang also appeared on Law of the Jungle and I Can See Your Voice with Baek Ji-young. Prior to the album's release, Kang appeared on the hundredth episode of MBC's Where Is My Home as the show's founding contributor and Problem Child in House to introduce his upcoming music. On April 13, Kang kicked off Yellow promotions with a press conference prior to the release and an online fan showcase. Ten days later, he appeared on KBS2's Come Back Home TV and I Live Alone. Kang was also invited as the first guerrilla date guest on the rebooted Entertainment Weekly where he met fans, including Hyun Jung-hwa.

== Commercial performance ==
The digital single "Paranoia" received two Gaon crowns and won four music show trophies with its music video exceeding 10 million views in two days and 20 million views in four days. It also marked Kang's first solo appearance on Billboard's World Digital Song Sales chart with the single debuting at number five.

Following the release of Yellow, Kang earned his first Gaon quadruple crown by topping the digital, album, download, and BGM weekly charts. Lead single "Antidote" was a commercial success in South Korea, debuting at number one on the Gaon Digital Chart for the chart issue dated April 11–17, 2021, becoming Kang's first domestic number one single. The song won a total of five music show trophies including his first Inkigayo win since debuting as a solo artist. The music video for "Antidote" exceeded 10 million views in 12 hours, besting Kang's previous record and later becoming his first solo music video to exceed 30 million views, doing so in four days. Yellow earned a Hanteo sales certificate, making it Kang's fourth album to place in Hanteo's top 10 solo artist first-week sales as of June 2021.

== Critical reception ==
Kang has garnered the most international media attention since debuting as a solo artist with the release of Yellow for his evolving musicality. In an article collecting Genius Korea's favorite albums of 2021, Yellow was described as being "mesmerizing without being enigmatic; its somber mood allows us to focus on the messages Kang succeeds to convey, without any word being lost in translation". Writing for Rolling Stone India, Riddhi Chakraborty highlighted the fact that Kang presented a stronger side of himself as a songwriter with writing credits — all of which were drawn from personal experience — on every track of Yellow. The EP was included in a list titled "Best K-pop Albums of 2021 so far" by South China Morning Post where Tamar Herman said Kang "reached new heights" with its release.

Professional ratings
Review scores
Source	Rating
IZM	3/5 stars
NME	4/5 stars

Listicles for Yellow
Publication	List	Rank	Ref.
Genius Korea	Favorite Albums of 2021 so far	—N/a	
Genius Korea	20 Best B-Sides of 2021 by Genius Korea	13	
Omelete	The 15 Best K-pop Albums of the Year	12	
Rolling Stone India	10 Best K-pop Albums of 2021	2	
South China Morning Post	Best K-pop Albums of 2021 so far	—N/a	
South China Morning Post	25 Best K-pop Albums of 2021	16	

== Track listing ==
Digital download/CD
No.	Title	Lyrics	Music	Arrangement	Length
1.	"Digital"	Kang Daniel; JQ; Su-rin; Cha Yu-bin	Anthony Russo; Jonathan Hoskins; MZMC	Jonathan Hoskins	3:04
2.	"Paranoia"	Kang Daniel; JQ; Mola; Cha Yu-bin	Anthony Russo; Anthony Pavel; Max Levin; Kyle Scherrer; MZMC; Chancellor	inverness; max & kyle; MZMC	3:15
3.	"Misunderstood" (featuring Omega Sapien)	Kang Daniel; JQ; Kim Hye-ji; Nam Hye-ju; Han Song-yi; Omega Sapien	Jackson Morgan; Landon Sears; Kaelyn Behr; MZMC	Styalz Fuego	3:24
4.	"Antidote"	Kang Daniel; JQ; Lee Yeon-ji; J14	Anthony Pavel; Jonathan Hoskins; MZMC	Jonathan Hoskins	3:39
5.	"Save U" (featuring Wonstein)	Kang Daniel; JQ; Lee Yeon-ji; Su-rin; Lee Seon-yu; Wonstein	Anthony Russo; Anthony Pavel; Jonathan Hoskins; Jamil "Digi" Chammas; MZMC	Jonathan Hoskins; Jamil "Digi" Chammas	3:38
Total length:					17:00

== Charts ==
=== Weekly charts ===
Chart (2021)	Peak position
South Korean Albums (Gaon)	1

=== Monthly charts ===
Chart (2021)	Peak position
South Korean Albums (Gaon)	4

=== Year-end charts ===
Chart (2021)	Position
South Korean Albums (Gaon)	44

== Certifications and sales ==
Sales certifications for Yellow
Region	Certification	Certified units/sales
South Korea (KMCA)	Platinum	250,000^{^}
^{^} Shipments figures based on certification alone.

Sales figures for Yellow
Region	Sales
South Korea (Gaon)	320,114

== Accolades ==
Year	Award	Category	Result	Ref.
2021	Asian Pop Music Awards (Note: Hosted by the Hong Kong Asia Pacific International Group and Sunway Records, the Asian Pop Music Awards bases its winners on the "Asian Pop Music Chart" which opened in September 2019.)	Best Male Artist – Overseas	Nominated	
2022	Seoul Music Awards	Main Award – Bonsang	Won	

== Release history ==
Release formats for Yellow
Region	Date	Format	Label
Various	April 13, 2021	Digital download; streaming	Konnect Entertainment; Sony Music
South Korea	April 13, 2021	CD	Konnect Entertainment; Sony Music

== See also ==
- List of certified albums in South Korea
- List of Gaon Album Chart number ones of 2021
