= Upside Down (Kang Daniel song) =

2022 single by Kang Daniel

Single by Kang Daniel

from the album The Story
- Released: May 24, 2022
- Genre: K-pop
- Length: 3:16
- Label: Konnect; Sony Music Korea
- Composers: KillaGraham; Sean Kennedy; MZMC
- Lyricists: Kang Daniel; Chancellor; Knave

Kang Daniel singles chronology
"Antidote" (2021)	"Upside Down" (2022)	"Move like This" (2022)

Music video
- "Upside Down" on YouTube "Upside Down (Performance ver.) on YouTube

"Upside Down" is a song by South Korean singer Kang Daniel. It was released on May 24, 2022 by Konnect Entertainment and distributed by Sony Music Korea. The song serves as the lead single from his debut studio album The Story.

A Japanese version of the song was included on Kang's Japanese debut EP titled Joy Ride which was released on October 5, 2022 through Warner Music Japan. The original Korean track was later reissued on November 24, 2022 via an album repackage, The Story: Retold.

== Background and composition ==
"Upside Down" is a medium tempo song that allows a Rhodes piano and heavy guitar sound to coexist. Lyrically, it contains Kang's "pleasant solution and message" to situations that are not going as planned. This is conveyed when he sings "I feel like I'm living in a world that's upside down / I need to change it back / Turn everything around". He expanded on the meaning by sharing that "There are days when you can't do anything [right]. The song is about one's determination to turn everything upside down on such days".

As a teaser for the title track, Konnect Entertainment released an interactive website designed by social media platform Behance on May 15, 2022. The specific team responsible for the design and development of the website additionally stated that "Upside Down" contains the message that "Even if things don't go according to our will, we don't succumb to reality and create our own world at our own pace. Finding [your] own color by creating a world that suits [you] rather than adjusting to the world's standards."

== Music video ==
The music video for "Upside Down" was directed by Wooje Kim of ETUI and premiered on Konnect Entertainment's YouTube channel at 18:00 (KST) on May 24, 2022. It was preceded by two teasers released on the same platform on May 20 and 23.

The song's official release is accompanied by a vibrant music video that takes place in various locations, including a neon-lit barbershop, a rooftop carpark, and a laundromat. It also features KANGDANIEL and his team of talented dancers delivering an astounding choreography with hip-hop and street dance elements.

— LionhearTV describing the "Upside Down" music video

It exceeded 10 million views in 10 hours, besting Kang's previous record. It was also included in a list titled "K-Pop Videos: Best of 2022" created by Tidal.

== Commercial performance ==
"Upside Down" peaked at number two on the Gaon Digital Chart for the chart issue dated May 22 to 28 in 2022. The song also took first place on MBC's Show! Music Core on June 4.

== Critical reception ==
"Upside Down" was included in a hand-picked selection of songs and videos by the subscription-based streaming service, Tidal. The latter list was described as "the best this year brought from the magical world of K-pop visuals that only enhance your listening experience".

Listicles for "Upside Down"
Publication	List	Rank	Ref.
Tidal	K-Pop: Best of 2022 So Far	—N/a	
Tidal	K-Pop Videos: Best of 2022	—N/a	

== Charts ==
Chart (2022)	Peak position
South Korea (Gaon)	2

== Accolades ==
=== Music program awards ===
Program	Date	Ref.
Show! Music Core (MBC)	June 4, 2022	

== Release history ==
Release dates and formats for "Upside Down"
Region	Date	Format	Version	Label
Various	May 24, 2022	Digital download; streaming	Original	Konnect; Sony Music Korea
Various	October 5, 2022	Digital download; streaming	Japanese	Warner Music Japan
Various	November 24, 2022	Digital download; streaming	Original	Konnect; Sony Music Korea

== See also ==
- List of Show! Music Core Chart winners (2022)
