= Re8el =

- Digital cover

EP by Kang Daniel
- Released: November 29, 2023
- Genre: J-pop
- Length: 13:03
- Language: Japanese; English
- Label: Warner Japan

Kang Daniel chronology
Realiez (2023)	Re8el (2023)	Act (2024)

Kang Daniel Japanese chronology
Joy Ride (2022)	Re8el (2023)

Singles from Re8el
- 1. "Re8el" Released: November 29, 2023

Music video
- "Re8el" on YouTube

Re8el (stylized in all caps) is the second Japanese-language extended play (seventh overall) by South Korean singer and songwriter Kang Daniel. It was released on November 29, 2023 by Warner Music Japan. Re8el contains four tracks, including the lead single of the same name, and Japanese versions of two tracks from Kang's previous Korean-language EP, Realiez.

The EP's release was accompanied with the music video for the title track, which was described as a "Japanese rock anthem". To promote the EP, Kang held three showcase concerts across Japan in January 2024.

== Track listing ==
Track listing and credits adapted from the EP's liner notes.

Re8el track listing
No.	Title	Lyrics	Music	Arrangement	Length
1.	"Worst Day Ever"	Chancellor; D&H; Knave; Yohei	Chancellor; Dohy; Knave; Viewhorse; Yeol		3:28
2.	"Re8el"	Chancellor; Yohei	Chancellor; Dohy; Knave; Viewhorse; Yeol		2:55
3.	"Supernova" (Japanese version)	Chancellor; Knave; Kanata Okajima	Remy Gautreau; Jesse Fink; Anthony Russo; Kyle Buckley; Charles Nelsen; MZMC	Pink Slip; Inverness; MZMC	3:28
4.	"SOS" (Japanese version)	Kang Daniel; Chancellor; Okajima; Knave	Jackson Morgan; Landon Sears; David Wilson; MZMC	Dwilly; MZMC	3:11
Total length:					13:03

== Charts ==
Weekly chart performance for Re8el
Chart (2023)	Peak position
Japan (Oricon)	10

== Release history ==
Release date and formats for Re8el
Region	Date	Format	Label
Various	November 29, 2023	Digital download; streaming	Warner Japan
Japan	November 29, 2023	CD	Warner Japan
