= 2U (Kang Daniel song) =

2020 single by Kang Daniel

Single by Kang Daniel

from the album Cyan
- Released: March 24, 2020
- Recorded: 2019
- Genre: K-pop
- Length: 3:15
- Label: Konnect; Sony Music
- Songwriters: Chancellor; Jin Ho-hyun
- Producer: Chancellor

Kang Daniel singles chronology
"Touchin'" (2019)	"2U" (2020)	"Refresh" (2020)

Music video
- "2U" on YouTube

"2U" is a song by South Korean singer Kang Daniel. It was released on March 24, 2020, by Konnect Entertainment and distributed by Sony Music Korea. The song serves as the lead single from his second EP Cyan.

== Background and composition ==
The lead single's name is a play on the English meaning "going to you" and the literal Korean pronunciation sounding similar to the word "reason" (Korean: 이유; RR: iyu). "2U" contains a message to a weary or lonely person running after their dreams: There are those who stay by your side who love you because you are you.

"2U" was written and composed by Korean-American artist Chancellor with Kang in mind from the onset. Even during Chancellor's initial working stages with the song, Kang thought it matched him well. He described "2U" as a hybrid of pop and hip-hop genres with a "gentle and comfortable" sound well-suited for spring, and MTV News pointed out the single had "R&B flourishes" as well. Writing for IZM, Hwang In-ho described it as house track incorporating a synth-based rhythm, R&B beats and slow tempo. As part of Grazia Korea's May cover story, Kang was asked if there was a specific reason for choosing groovy title tracks such as "2U" despite others thinking of him as an artist with powerful, strong performances. He replied that he wanted to show what he is capable of step-by-step to heighten the sense of tension.

== Music video ==
A music video teaser emulating a movie poster composition was revealed on March 20. The full music video directed by VM Project Architecture was released alongside the song. Doug Riggs, Caspar von Winterfeldt, and Brian Scott Robinson headed the US crew. It was filmed in one day at the Los Angeles Theatre. Kang found the filming location's inspiration and vibe to be well-connected to the song's concept and himself.

== Commercial performance ==
"2U" is Kang's first top ten single on the Gaon Digital Chart, peaking at number 7. According to the Korea Music Content Association, Kang achieved a Gaon triple crown during the thirteenth week of 2020 in part due to "2U" ranking first in the download and BGM charts. Those sales were further reflected in the Gaon monthly charts for March 2020 with "2U" topping the download chart and ranking number 15 in the subsequent BGM chart. The song also took first place on five music shows: The Show, Music Bank, Show! Music Core, Show Champion, and M Countdown.

== Charts ==
Chart (2020)	Peak position
South Korea (Gaon)	7
South Korea (Kpop Hot 100)	81

== Accolades ==
=== Music program awards ===
Program	Date	Ref.
The Show	March 31, 2020	
Music Bank	April 3, 2020	
Show! Music Core	April 4, 2020	
Show Champion	April 8, 2020	
M Countdown	April 9, 2020	

== Release history ==
Region	Date	Format	Label
Various	March 24, 2020	Digital download; streaming	Konnect Entertainment; Sony Music

== See also ==
- List of M Countdown Chart winners (2020)
- List of Music Bank Chart winners (2020)
- List of Show! Music Core Chart winners (2020)
