= Act (EP) =

- Digital cover

EP by Kang Daniel
- Released: September 23, 2024
- Genre: K-pop
- Length: 14:38
- Languages: Korean; English
- Labels: ARA; Warner; ADA

Kang Daniel Korean chronology
Realiez (2023)	Act (2024)	Glow to Haze (2025)

Singles from Act
- 1. "Electric Shock" Released: September 23, 2024

Music video
- "Electric Shock" on YouTube "Electric Shock" (Performance ver.) on YouTube

Act (stylized in all caps) is the sixth Korean-language extended play (EP) (eighth overall) by South Korean singer and songwriter Kang Daniel. It was released on September 23, 2024, by ARA Inc. and distributed by Warner Music Korea. Act contains six tracks, including the EP's lead single, "Electric Shock". The EP debuted at number eight on South Korea's Circle Album Chart.

== Background and release ==
In June 2024, Kang Daniel announced the termination of his recording contract and dissolution of the company he founded, Konnect Entertainment, after Kang filed a criminal complaint against the company's largest shareholder for embezzlement, forgery, and fraud, among other things. In late July, it was announced that Kang had signed a contract with a new agency, Artistic Round Alliance (ARA).

Kang's first project under the new agency, an EP entitled Act, was announced in a teaser video on August 30, with the agency specifying a September 2024 release date. On September 11 the release date was officially confirmed to be September 23, along with announcing the lead single, "Electric Shock". The EP's release comes 1 year and 3 months after his previous Korean-language EP, Realiez. Two days later, the EP's track listing and production credits were revealed, with Kang participating in writing lyrics for all six tracks.

Kang referred to the EP as "a new story", with the title being a reference to the theatre term "act", signifying the end of one scene and the start of another. After the shutdown Konnect, Kang said he felt "stranded" and "empty", and locked himself in his house for three months. Kang said he transferred the experience into Act and wrote the tracks according to the thoughts he had.

Act was officially released on September 23, 2024, simultaneously with the lead single "Electric Shock" and its accompanying music video.

== Composition ==
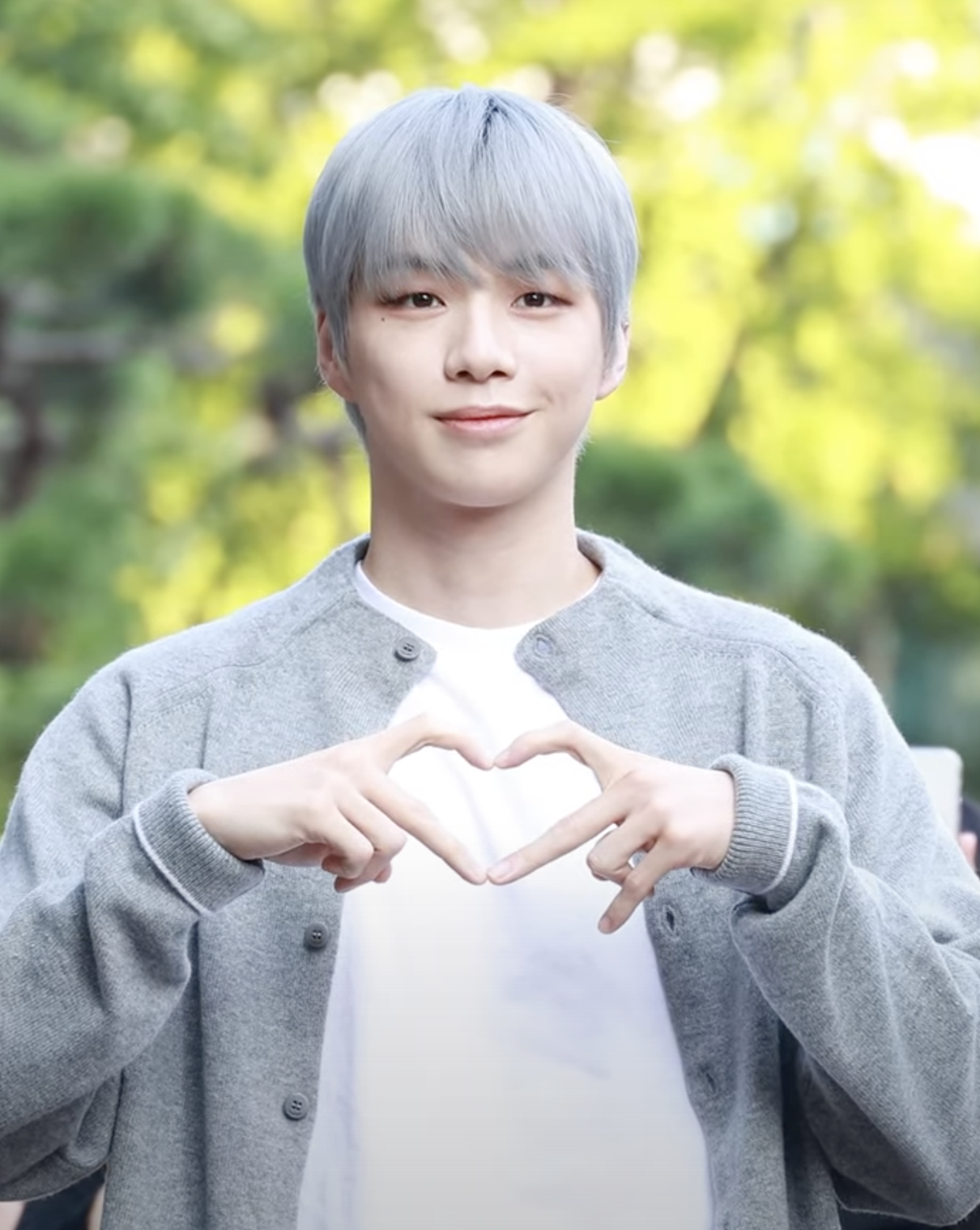
Kang arriving to Music Bank on September 26, 2024 to promote Act

Act has been described as a K-pop EP with influences of trap, house, R&B and EDM. Kang wrote lyrics for all six tracks, and worked with American producers Nøll, Chando and Michael Lanza to produce the EP. The EP's opening track, "Losing Myself", is an EDM song with heavy dubstep drums and guitar riffs. "Get Loose" is a track with an "upbeat" and "smooth" beat, and was the last song Kang recorded for the project. "Electric Shock", the EP's lead single, is a pop track with R&B influences, trap drums and synthesizer bass. The EP's fourth track, "Come Back to Me", features vocals by Chung Ha and is recorded entirely in English. Kang felt the track needed a female voice with a warm tone, "like a warm cup of coffee in the cold wind." "9 Lives" is an EDM song and was created by Kang to give the album a "hopeful, positive" feeling to close the project.

A bonus track, "Betcho Love", was released exclusively to physical editions of the EP and is not available digitally.

== Promotion ==
In support of the EP, Kang held two concerts at Jangchung Arena in October. The 21-song, 120-minute long show was Kang's first solo concert in the city in over a year. Kang later announced further concert dates, bringing the show to Japan, Thailand, Hong Kong, Australia, and Taiwan beginning in January 2025.

== Commercial performance ==
Act debuted at number eight on South Korea's Circle Album Chart for the week ending September 28. A second version of the EP also charted at number nine, for a combined total of 102,505 copies sold in the first week. On the monthly chart, the two versions of Act peaked at numbers nineteen and twenty-five, respectively, for September 2024. As of October 2024, the EP has sold 119,301 copies in South Korea.

== Track listing ==
Track listing and credits adapted from the EP's liner notes.

Act track listing
No.	Title	Lyrics	Music	Arrangement	Length
1.	"Losing Myself"	Kang Daniel; ChaMane; Purple	Alvin Chen; Michael Lanza; Chando Yun	Nøll; Chando; Lanza	2:15
2.	"Get Loose"	Kang; Noday; Riskypizza	Noday; Riskypizza	Riskypizza; Glowcean; Noday	2:52
3.	"Electric Shock"	Kang; Lee Seung-yoo (MUMW); Kim Gyul (MUMW); Y0ung (MUMW); Ahn Young-joo; Haesa (MUMW); HML	Chen; Yun; Lanza; Damnboy!	Nøll; Chando; Lanza; Purple	2:50
4.	"Come Back to Me" (featuring Chung Ha)	Kang; Chen; Yun; Lanza; Damnboy!	Chen; Lanza; Yun; Damnboy!	Nøll; Chando; Lanza; Damnboy!	3:26
5.	"9 Lives"	Kang; Knave; Sohlhee; Y0ung (MUMW)	Chen; Knave; Yun; Lanza	Nøll; Chando; Lanza	3:13
Total length:					14:38

Act physical edition bonus track
No.	Title	Lyrics	Music	Arrangement	Length
6.	"Betcho Love"	Kang; Hyang (MUMW); Y0ung (MUMW); 217 (MUMW); HML	Chen; Lanza; Yun; Damnboy!	Nøll; Chando; Lanza; Damnboy!	2:22
Total length:					17:00

== Charts ==
=== Weekly charts ===
Weekly chart performance for Act
Chart (2024)	Peak position
South Korean Albums (Circle)	8 (Note: A second version of Act charted separately at number 9.)

=== Monthly charts ===
Monthly chart performance for Act
Chart (2024)	Position
South Korean Albums (Circle)	19 (Note: A second version of Act charted separately at number 25.)

== Release history ==
Release history for Act
Region	Date	Format	Label
South Korea	September 23, 2024	CD	ARA; Warner
Various	September 23, 2024	Digital download; streaming	ARA; ADA
