= Magenta (EP) =

EP by Kang Daniel
- Released: August 3, 2020
- Recorded: 2020
- Genre: K-pop
- Length: 20:05
- Language: Korean
- Label: Konnect; Sony Music

Kang Daniel chronology
Cyan (2020)	Magenta (2020)	Yellow (2021)

Singles from Magenta
- 1. "Waves" Released: July 27, 2020; 2. "Who U Are" Released: August 3, 2020

Music video
- "Waves" on YouTube "Who U Are" on YouTube "Movie" on YouTube

Professional ratings
Review scores
Source	Rating
IZM	3/5 stars

Magenta (stylized MAGENTA) is the third extended play (EP) by South Korean singer and songwriter Kang Daniel. It was released on August 3, 2020, by Konnect Entertainment and distributed by Sony Music Korea. Magenta contains six tracks with "Who U Are" as its lead single. "Waves" featuring Simon Dominic and Jamie was pre-released on July 27.

== Background and composition ==
On July 5, 2020, Konnect Entertainment posted a comeback teaser video for Magenta, the second mini album in Kang's "Color" album trilogy series. Album pre-orders began on July 13. While Cyan showed bright and refreshing colors, Magenta is described as having strong and powerful colors that capture the beginning and end of summer. Kang wanted to show onstage what many think is the most "Kang Daniel-like" and bring energy to listeners through fun dance music. He participated in writing five songs.

Inspired by dancehall and hip-hop, "Waves" has 808 bass drums, Latin guitar, and piano staccato sounds. Lyrically, the song is about succumbing to waves of emotion. "Who U Are" combines 808 bass drums, Latin guitar, flute, synthesizer, and vocal effects and talks about awakening inner emotions unknown to even oneself.

== Artwork ==
The album cover features two glowing magenta circles merged to form a Venn diagram. In addition, as part of the Color EP trilogy, the hex code for magenta (as well as fuchsia; #FF00FF) is on the top left corner.

== Promotion ==
Kang revealed the "Waves" music video at his online fan meeting on July 25 prior to the official music site release. To commemorate the album's release, he held an album countdown V Live show on August 3 and virtual fan-sign events. Kang performed on all music shows and appeared on radio shows Kim Shin Young's Song of Hope, Volume Up, and Love Game within the two weeks of promotions. He also appeared on the August 7 episode of You Hee-yeol's Sketchbook and performed "Who U Are", "Interview", as well as a brief cover of Johan Kim's hit song "I Want to Fall in Love". In addition, Kang made several appearances as a special MC and judge on KBS2's Fun-Staurant, and performed a snippet of "Who U Are". After Kang wrapped up broadcast promotions, he released a surprise music video for the B-side track "Movie".

== Commercial performance ==
Magenta surpassed 320,000 physical album sales within a week and resulted in a Hanteo Chart official certificate. Kang earned a Gaon triple crown by topping the album, download, and BGM weekly charts. The music video for the lead single "Who U Are" surpassed 10 million views within four days of its release, setting a personal record for Kang. The song also took first place on three music shows: The Show, Music Bank, and Show! Music Core.

== Track listing ==
Digital download/CD
No.	Title	Lyrics	Music	Arrangement	Length
1.	"Flash"	JQ; Kang Daniel; Lee Ji-won; Ameli; Shin Sae-rom	Anthony Russo; Anthony Pavel; Kaelyn Behr; Rudy Sandapa; MZMC	Styalz Fuego; Rudy Sandapa	3:48
2.	"Waves" (featuring Simon Dominic and Jamie)	ae.patricia; BIYA; Simon Dominic; Jamie; Kang Daniel	Anthony Russo; Julien Maurice Moore; Kaelyn Behr; MZMC	Styalz Fuego	2:44
3.	"Who U Are" (깨워; kkaewo; lit. Wake Up)	JQ; Kang Daniel; Bae Sung-hyun; Ameli; Shin Sae-rom	Anthony Russo; Anthony Pavel; Kyle Buckley; MZMC	Pinkslip; inverness; MZMC	3:22
4.	"Runaway" (featuring Yumdda)	ae.patricia; Yumdda; Kang Daniel	Advanced; Charlotte Wilson; Jacob Aaron; The Hub 88	Advanced	3:15
5.	"Movie" (featuring Dvwn)	Dvwn; Kang Daniel	Kyle Buckley; Jeremy Jasper; Julien Maurice Moore; MZMC	Pinkslip; inverness; MZMC	2:59
6.	"Night" (밤; bam)	Noday; Jung Jin-hyung; Riskypizza	Noday; Riskypizza; Jung Jin-hyung	Noday; Riskypizza	3:57
Total length:					20:05

== Charts ==
=== Weekly charts ===
Chart (2020)	Peak position
Japanese Albums (Oricon)	94
South Korean Albums (Gaon)	1

=== Monthly charts ===
Chart (2020)	Peak position
South Korean Albums (Gaon)	1

=== Year-end charts ===
Chart (2020)	Position
South Korean Albums (Gaon)	31

=== Singles ===
Weekly chart performance for Magenta singles
Chart (2020)	Peak positions	
Chart (2020)	"Waves"	"Who U Are"
South Korea (Gaon)	102	12
South Korea (Kpop Hot 100)	92	80

== Certifications and sales ==
Sales certifications for Magenta
Region	Certification	Certified units/sales
South Korea (KMCA)	Platinum	250,000^{^}
^{^} Shipments figures based on certification alone.

Sales figures for Magenta
Region	Sales
South Korea (Gaon)	337,785

== Accolades ==
=== Music program awards ===
Song	Program	Date	Ref.
"Who U Are"	The Show (SBS MTV)	August 11, 2020	
"Who U Are"	Music Bank (KBS2)	August 14, 2020	
"Who U Are"	Show! Music Core (MBC)	August 15, 2020	

== Release history ==
Release formats for Magenta
Region	Date	Format	Label
Various	August 3, 2020	Digital download; streaming	Konnect Entertainment; Sony Music
South Korea	August 3, 2020	CD	Konnect Entertainment; Sony Music

== See also ==
- List of certified albums in South Korea
- List of Gaon Album Chart number ones of 2020
