= Color on Me =

EP by Kang Daniel
- Released: July 25, 2019
- Recorded: 2019
- Genre: K-pop
- Length: 13:05
- Language: Korean
- Label: Konnect; Sony Music
- Producer: Kei Lim (Devine-Channel)

Kang Daniel chronology
Color on Me (2019)	Cyan (2020)

Singles from Color on Me
- 1. "What Are You Up To" Released: July 25, 2019

Color on Me (stylized color on me) is the debut extended play (EP) by South Korean singer-songwriter Kang Daniel. It was released on July 25, 2019 by Konnect Entertainment and distributed by Sony Music Korea. Color on Me contains five tracks with "What Are You Up To" (뭐해) serving as its lead single.

== Background ==
On July 11, 2019 at midnight KST, Konnect Entertainment launched a newly created website with a 24-hour countdown. The following day at midnight KST, the first teaser for Kang's solo debut which included the date July 25, 2019 was revealed. It was also revealed that the CEO of Devine-Channel (Kei Lim) was the main producer of the EP. In the following days, four more teaser images were released on Konnect's official website and pre-orders for the EP started on July 16. Two days later, the tracklist was revealed showing a total of five songs with audio previews for each released the following day. Lim revealed that the album was completed in such a short time due to Kang focusing solely on producing the album. While Lim assisted with the album's technical side, Kang mostly controlled its direction and message. At the debut showcase, Kang stated the album's title was inspired from the second track "Color" since he wanted to show his diverse sides. He participated in writing four songs and received a lot of inspiration from films and fans' messages.

In retrospect, Kang expressed that Color on Me was "an album with many regrets" during his documentary film Kang Daniel: My Parade (2023). Following his legal dispute with his former agency and subsequent six-month hiatus from the entertainment industry, Kang revealed that the entire album was prepared within just two weeks.

== Packaging ==
Korean graphic designer Jiyoon Lee of Studio XXX was responsible for the album design of Color on Me. In an interview with Bandwagon Asia explaining her creative process, she revealed that both her and Konnect Entertainment were in agreement to emphasize Kang's presence as a solo artist and "wanted the album to look like a special edition from a fashion magazine".

== Promotion ==
Kang Daniel held two debut showcases on July 25 at YES24 Live Hall, 4PM KST for the press and 8PM KST for his fans. He held six domestic fan-signs between July 31 and August 3 in Gwangju, Daejeon, Busan, Daegu, Yeouido, and Sangam. Following that, Kang kicked off the international leg of his fan meeting tour with stops in Singapore, Bangkok, Taipei, Kuala Lumpur, and Manila. He ended the tour in Ilsan with a two-day fan meeting on November 23–24 and a three-day exhibition ending on the 24th at KINTEX. In between touring, Kang organized "What Are You Up To" and "I Hope" mu:fully performance video uploads in early September. His first general public event performance occurred on October 25 at Busan One Asia Festival.

== Commercial performance ==
On July 22, it was reported that stock pre-orders for Color on Me exceeded 450,000 copies over the first seven days of the pre-order period.

Upon its release in South Korea, Color on Me sold 342,218 copies on its first-day, making it the highest first-day sales for a soloist in the history of Hanteo Chart. As of July 31, the third day since the EP's physical release, Color on Me sold over 400,000 copies, also breaking the record for the highest first-week sales for a soloist in the history of Hanteo Chart. It topped South Korea's Gaon Album Chart and entered Japan's Oricon Albums Chart at number 23.

Despite not appearing on any music shows, Kang took home his first-ever solo music show win on KBS2's Music Bank with "What Are You Up To" placing first on August 9, 2019. Later that year, Sony Music Entertainment announced its biggest global sellers for its second fiscal quarter of 2019 with Kang's Color on Me placing fifth.

== Track listing ==
Digital download/CD
No.	Title	Lyrics	Music	Arrangement	Length
1.	"Intro (Through the Night)"	Flow Blow	Flow Blow	Flow Blow	1:19
2.	"Color"	Yorkie; Thama; Kang Daniel	Geoffrocause; Devine-Channel; Thama	Geoffrocause; Devine-Channel	2:56
3.	"What Are You Up To" (뭐해; mwohae; lit. What Are You Doing)	Yorkie; Thama; Kang Daniel	Devine-Channel; Thama	Devine-Channel	3:02
4.	"Horizon"	Yorkie; Thama; Kang Daniel	Devine-Channel; Thama	Devine-Channel	2:36
5.	"I Hope"	Kang Daniel; Flow Blow	Flow Blow	Flow Blow	3:07
Total length:					13:05

== Charts ==
=== Weekly charts ===
Chart (2019)	Peak position
Japanese Albums (Oricon)	23
South Korean Albums (Gaon)	1

=== Monthly charts ===
Chart (2019)	Peak position
South Korean Albums (Gaon)	2

=== Year-end charts ===
Chart (2019)	Position
South Korean Albums (Gaon)	7

== Certifications and sales ==
Sales certifications for Color on Me
Region	Certification	Certified units/sales
South Korea (KMCA)	2× Platinum	500,000^{^}
^{^} Shipments figures based on certification alone.

Sales figures for Color on Me
Region	Sales
South Korea (Gaon)	500,134
Japan (Oricon)	2,324

== Release history ==
Release formats for Color on Me
Region	Date	Format	Label
Various	July 25, 2019	Digital download; streaming	Konnect Entertainment; Sony Music
South Korea	July 29, 2019	CD	Konnect Entertainment; Sony Music

== See also ==
- List of certified albums in South Korea
- List of Gaon Album Chart number ones of 2019
