= Glow to Haze =

- Digital cover

EP by Kang Daniel
- Released: June 16, 2025
- Genre: K-pop
- Length: 14:39
- Language: Korean; English
- Label: ARA; Warner; ADA

Kang Daniel chronology
Act (2024)	Glow to Haze (2025)

Singles from Glow to Haze
- 1. "Episode" Released: June 16, 2025

Glow to Haze is the seventh Korean-language and ninth overall extended play (EP) by South Korean singer and songwriter Kang Daniel. It was released on June 16, 2025, by ARA Inc. and distributed by Warner Music Korea. Glow to Haze contains five tracks, including the EP's lead single, "Episode". The EP debuted at number two on South Korea's Circle Album Chart.

== Background and composition ==
Daniel wrote the lyrics for four of the songs, including "Episode", and was credited for the first time as a composer on "Love Game". The EP was structured like a "five-track movie", with upbeat sounds in the first half representing the "glow" and "fading emotions" in the second half representing the "haze".

== Promotion ==
The EP was announced two weeks after the conclusion of Kang's European tour in support of his previous EP Act (2024). The announcement was accompanied by an "exhibit intro" film showing a museum bearing the name of the EP.

== Commercial performance ==
Glow to Haze debuted at number two on the South Korean Circle Album Chart for the week ending June 21, 2025. A second version of the EP also charted at number seven, for a combined total of 72,198 copies sold in the first week.

== Track listing ==
Glow to Haze track listing
No.	Title	Length
1.	"Movie Star"	2:58
2.	"Episode"	2:42
3.	"Love Game"	3:03
4.	"One Call Away"	3:35
5.	"Little Bit Lost"	2:21
Total length:		14:39

== Charts ==
=== Weekly charts ===
Weekly chart performance for Glow to Haze
Chart (2025)	Peak position
South Korean Albums (Circle)	2

=== Monthly charts ===
Monthly chart performance for Glow to Haze
Chart (2025)	Position
South Korean Albums (Circle)	20

== Release history ==
Release history for Glow to Haze
Region	Date	Format	Label
South Korea	June 16, 2025	CD	ARA; Warner
Various	June 16, 2025	Digital download; streaming	ARA; ADA
