= Dvwn =

South Korean singer-songwriter

- Born: Jung Da-woon; February 24, 1994 (age 31); Pyeongtaek, Gyeonggi-do, South Korea
- Occupations: Singer; songwriter
- Musical career
- Genres: R&B; indie rock
- Instrument: Vocals
- Years active: 2018–present
- Labels: KOZ Entertainment; Studio Mos

Korean name
- Hangul: 정다운
- RR: Jeong Daun
- MR: Chŏng Taun

Jung Da-woon (born February 24, 1994), better known as Dvwn (Korean: 다운), is a South Korean singer-songwriter. He made his solo debut on November 21, 2018 with the extended play, Panorama. He has written and composed songs for various artists including Kangta, NCT Dream, Young K and Kang Daniel.

== Discography ==
=== Extended plays ===
- Panorama (2018)
- It's Not Your Fault (2021)

=== Single albums ===
- Dawn's Defibrillation Vol. 1 (2019)
- Dawn's Defibrillation Vol. 3 (2020)

=== Singles ===
List of selected singles, showing year released, selected chart positions, and name of the album
Title	Year	Peak chart positions	Album
Title	Year	KOR Down.	Album
As lead artist
"Phobia"	2018	—	Panorama
"Fairy"	2018	—	Panorama
"Last"	2019	—	Dawn's Defibrillation Vol. 1
"Burn the Memory" (feat. Giriboy)	2020	—	Non-album singles
"Concrete" (feat. Cheeze)	2020	—	Dawn's Defibrillation Vol. 3
"Free Flight"	2021	—	Non-album singles
"Yeonnam Dong" (feat. Lil Boi)	2021	—	It's Not Your Fault
"Lost"	2022		Non-album single
"29" (Prod. Pateko)	2022	—	Listen-Up Ep. 9
"Highteen"	2023	—	Non-album single
As featured artist
"Being Left" (Zico feat. Dvwn)	2019	41	Thinking
"Movie" (Kang Daniel feat. Dvwn)	2020	29	Magenta
"Microphone" (Young K feat. Dvwn)	2021	94	Eternal
"Protection" (CHE feat. Dvwn)	2022	—	Kpop
"Missing You" (Soovi feat. Dvwn)	2023	—	A Tempo
"Last Train" (Greentea feat. Dvwn)	2023	—	At the End of This Regret, There's a Greater Love

=== Soundtrack appearances ===
List of singles, showing year released, selected chart positions, and name of the album
Title	Year	Peak chart positions	Album
Title	Year	KOR Down.	Album
"No Problem"	2021	28	The Uncanny Counter OST Part. 3
"I'm in Paris"	2021	—	Yumi's Cells OST Part. 9
"What A Wonderful Day"	2022	—	Rookie Cops OST Part. 5
"I'm in Love With You"	2022	—	The Law Cafe OST Part. 4
"Still"	2023	—	Doona! OST
"Island"	2024	—	Tell Me That You Love Me OST Part. 6

== Songwriting credits ==
All song credits are adapted from the Korea Music Copyright Association's database unless stated otherwise.

List of songs, showing year released, artist name, and name of the album
Title	Year	Artist	Album	Composer	Lyricist
"Falling" (feat. Dvwn)	2017	L.NDN	Blackout	Yes	Yes
"Let's Get Lost" (feat. Dvwn, prod. Distract)	2018	Sophiya	Non-album single	Yes	Yes
"Karma"	2018	Babylon	Caelo	Yes	Yes
"Mapo Tofu"	2018	Lay Zhang	Namanana	Yes	Yes
"Phobia"	2018	Dvwn	Panorama	Yes	Yes
"Fairy"	2018	Dvwn	Panorama	Yes	Yes
"Underwater Swimming" (feat. Ron)	2018	Dvwn	Panorama	Yes	Yes
"Develop"	2018	Dvwn	Panorama	Yes	Yes
"Ordinary Christmas"	2018	Dress	Non-album single	Yes	Yes
"Escape"	2018	TraxX	Non-album single	Yes	No
"Love Yourself"	2019	Eric Nam	It's Okay to be Sensitive 2 OST Part. 1	Yes	Yes
"SSFW"	2019	Chanyeol	Non-album single	Yes	Yes
"Sick of Love"	2019	Hyngsn	Damdi	No	Yes
"Tsukame (It's Coming)"	2019	Produce 101 Japan	Non-album single	Yes	No
"Being Left" (feat. Dvwn)	2019	Zico	Thinking	Yes	No
"Adulthood"	2019	Kang Daniel	Touchin'	Yes	Yes
"Fuego" (feat. RGP)	2019	U-Kwon	Rise Up	Yes	Yes
"Insomnia" (feat. Yayyoung)	2020	Dvwn	Non-album singles	Yes	Yes
"Last"	2020	Dvwn	Non-album singles	Yes	Yes
"Dreamcatcher"	2020	GFriend	Labyrinth	Yes	Yes
"Burn the Memory" (feat. Giriboy)	2020	Dvwn	Non-album singles	Yes	Yes
"Forever"	2020	Dvwn	Non-album singles	Yes	Yes
"Concrete" (feat. Cheeze)	2020	Dvwn	Non-album singles	Yes	Yes
"Movie"	2020	Kang Daniel	Magenta	Yes	Yes
"Free Flight"	2021	Dvwn	Non-album single	Yes	Yes
"Cough Syrup"	2021	Kangta	SM Station Season 4	Yes	Yes
"Heart Attack"	2021	Shinee	Don't Call Me	Yes	Yes
"What A Wonderful Word" (feat. Young K)	2021	Park Moon-chi	Non-album single	Yes	Yes
"Yeonnam Dong" (Illboi)	2021	Dvwn	It's Not Your Fault	Yes	Yes
"Dot"	2021	Dvwn	It's Not Your Fault	Yes	Yes
"Goodnight" (feat. Kwon Jin-ah)	2021	Dvwn	It's Not Your Fault	Yes	Yes
"Humming" (feat. Che)	2021	Dvwn	It's Not Your Fault	Yes	Yes
"Mirror"	2021	Dvwn	It's Not Your Fault	Yes	Yes
"Hostel" (feat. Jane)	2021	Dvwn	It's Not Your Fault	Yes	Yes
"Badkid"	2021	Dvwn	It's Not Your Fault	Yes	Yes
"Home"	2021	Dvwn	It's Not Your Fault	Yes	Yes
"Microphone" (feat. Dvwn)	2021	Young K	Eternal	No	Yes
"Alone" (feat. Sole and Dvwn)	2021	Cosmic Boy	Can I Not?	Yes	Yes
"Goodbye"	2021	Sunny, Jungwoo and Renjun	2021 Winter SM Town: SMCU Express	Yes	No
"Protection" (feat. Dvwn)	2022	CHE	K-Pop	Yes	Yes
"Blinder"	2022	Kingdom	History of Kingdom: Part IV. Dann	Yes	No
"True Colors"	2022	Dvwn	Non-album single	Yes	Yes
"Empty"	2022	Dvwn	Non-album single	Yes	Yes
"Lost"	2022	Dvwn	Non-album single	Yes	Yes
"Poker" (feat. Dvwn)	2022	Big Naughty	Nangman	Yes	Yes
"How to Say" (feat. Dvwn)	2022	Basecamp	Underground	Yes	Yes
"Black Hole"	2022	P1Harmony	Harmony: Zero In	Yes	Yes
"29" (prod. Pateko)	2022	Dvwn	Listen-Up Ep. 9	Yes	Yes
"Moon"	2022	NCT Dream	Candy	Yes	Yes
"Missing You" (feat. Dvwn)	2022	Soovi	A Tempo	Yes	Yes
"Highteen"	2023	Dvwn	Non-album single	Yes	Yes
"Nabi"	2023	OnlyOneOf	Seoul Collection	No	Yes

== Concert and tours ==
=== Concert participation ===
- 2022 Weverse Con [New Era]
- 2023 Weverse Con Festival

== Awards and nominations ==
Name of the award ceremony, year presented, category, nominee of the award, and the result of the nomination
Award ceremony	Year	Category	Nominee(s) / Work(s)	Result	Ref.
Korean Music Awards	2022	Best R&B & Soul – Album	It's Not Your Fault	Nominated	
