= Cyan (EP) =

EP by Kang Daniel
- Released: March 24, 2020
- Recorded: 2019–2020
- Genre: K-pop
- Length: 16:16
- Language: Korean
- Labels: Konnect; Sony Music

Kang Daniel chronology
Color on Me (2019)	Cyan (2020)	Magenta (2020)

Singles from Cyan
- 1. "Touchin'" Released: November 25, 2019; 2. "2U" Released: March 24, 2020

Cyan (stylized CYAN) is the second extended play (EP) by South Korean singer and songwriter Kang Daniel. It was released on March 24, 2020 by Konnect Entertainment and distributed by Sony Music Korea. Cyan contains five tracks with "2U" serving as its lead single. "Touchin'" was pre-released in 2019 and included in the EP.

== Background ==
On March 2, 2020, Kang posted on his Instagram account for the first time since his hiatus in December, updating that he completed recording music. Following that post, Konnect officially announced a return in March. On March 9, Konnect confirmed Kang would release his first mini album Cyan on March 24. Pre-orders began on March 11.

Kang described Cyan as the "first button" in the process of finding his true colors as part of his "color trilogy" project. For Cyan he aimed to project positive energy and put his dreams, passion, and challenges with the cyan color. He took part in the process of making the album from track selection and recording to choosing the release themes, working on the choreography, and being involved with music video production. In an interview with Grazia Korea, Kang was asked about the goal of this first installment. He responded that the album was released shortly after his break, so he wanted the songs to be enjoyable to listen to. Just hearing that his songs were good meant he achieved his goals. Cyan was about new songs, and the next album in the trilogy encompasses what he is good at in addition to showcasing new things.

== Promotion ==
Kang kicked off promotions by appearing on the March 22 episode of Running Man and performed a preview of "2U". Kang's comeback show aired on Mnet and M2 channels on March 24 at 8PM KST. He performed lead single "2U" in addition to B-sides "Jealous", "Touchin'", and "Adulthood" and prepared various content, including a look into his daily life. No media showcase was held in consideration of the COVID-19 situation. He performed on all music shows and appeared on radio shows Idol Radio, Volume Up, and Choi Hwa-jung's Power Time within the two weeks of promotions.

== Commercial performance ==
Cyan reached 260,000 physical album sales within a week. According to Hanteo Chart, Cyan had the highest cumulative first-week sales in 2020 by a soloist at the time and the fourth highest first-week sales among all albums released in the first quarter of 2020. Kang also achieved a Gaon triple crown by topping the album, download, and BGM weekly charts.

== Track listing ==
Digital download/CD
No.	Title	Lyrics	Music	Arrangement	Length
1.	"Adulthood"	Dvwn; Noday; Versachoi; Kang Daniel	Noday; Dvwn; Versachoi	Versachoi; Noday	3:05
2.	"2U"	Chancellor; Jin Ho-hyun	Chancellor	Chancellor	3:15
3.	"Jealous"	JQ; Tomboy1; Tomboy2; Jung Il-kwon	Rajan Muse; Jan Baars; Jacob Aaron; Awry; The Hub 88	Rajan Muse; Jan Baars	3:30
4.	"Interview"	Noday; oiaisle; Park Moon-chi	Noday; oiaisle; Park Moon-chi	Park Moon-chi	3:21
5.	"Touchin'"	JQ; Shin Sae-rom; Kang Eun-yoo	Laurent Wilthien; Jean-Noel Wilthien; Matthieu Tosi; Nick McKerl; Logan Lee Turner; Ryan S. Jhun; Noday	Royale Avenue; Ryan S. Jhun	3:05
Total length:					16:16

== Charts ==
=== Weekly charts ===
Chart (2020)	Peak position
South Korean Albums (Gaon)	1

=== Monthly charts ===
Chart (2020)	Peak position
South Korean Albums (Gaon)	2

=== Year-end charts ===
Chart (2020)	Position
South Korean Albums (Gaon)	35

== Certifications and sales ==
Certifications for Cyan
Region	Certification	Certified units/sales
South Korea (KMCA)	Platinum	250,000^{^}
^{^} Shipments figures based on certification alone.

Sales figures for Cyan
Region	Sales
South Korea (Gaon)	266,176

== Release history ==
Release formats for Cyan
Region	Date	Format	Label
Various	March 24, 2020	Digital download; streaming	Konnect Entertainment; Sony Music
South Korea	March 24, 2020	CD	Konnect Entertainment; Sony Music

== See also ==
- List of certified albums in South Korea
- List of Gaon Album Chart number ones of 2020
