= Paranoia (Kang Daniel song) =

2021 single by Kang Daniel

Single by Kang Daniel

from the album Yellow
- Released: February 16, 2021
- Genre: K-pop
- Length: 3:15
- Label: Konnect; Sony Music
- Composers: Inverness; Max & Kyle; MZMC
- Lyricists: Kang Daniel; JQ; Mola; Cha Yu-bin

Kang Daniel singles chronology
"State of Wonder" (2021)	"Paranoia" (2021)	"Antidote" (2021)

Music video
- "Paranoia" on YouTube "Paranoia (Performance ver.)" on YouTube

"Paranoia" is a song by South Korean singer Kang Daniel. It was released digitally by Konnect Entertainment on February 16, 2021 and was later included in his fourth EP Yellow on April 13, 2021.

== Background and composition ==
During an online press conference held to commemorate the single's release, Kang expanded on the meaning of "Paranoia" by sharing that "The theme in itself is heavy and distant, but since I'm resolving feelings I've personally felt, I wanted to express them honestly. I believe this is a feeling everyone can relate to, there's only a difference in the extent and the depth." He continued by saying "The reason I put focus on such a dark aspect is because the majority of people are reluctant to bring this up. I wanted to confess my inner concerns and communicate them." The single resurrects Kang's battle with those who tormented him through cyberbullying and the inner demons that subsequently sprang to life.

"Paranoia" combines synth bells, 808 bass, and an electric guitar. In an interview with fashion-industry trade journal WWD, Kang revealed that he drew inspiration for the various tracks on Yellow from his personal experiences during a difficult period in his career and is credited as the main lyricist for the pre-released single "Paranoia".

== Music video ==
The music video for "Paranoia" was directed by Rigend Film and premiered on Konnect Entertainment's YouTube channel at 18:00 (KST) on February 16, 2021. It was preceded by two teasers released on the same platform on February 10 and 12.

The video for the alt-rock trap number sees Kang attempting to hide and escape from a mysterious and monstrous dark figure. There are various scenes that allude to social anxiety, panic attacks and the track's namesake paranoia, including a suffocating shot of Kang trapped underwater and moments where he's walking through a crowded space, increasingly fearful and wary of everyone around him. [...] The video switches between shots of the singer-songwriter hiding alone in his bedroom and scenes of him performing crisp but manic choreography with confidence. At the end, he faces the dark monster and fights it as it attempts to kill him, but is shocked by the terrifying realization that the monster is himself and therefore he can never truly escape.

— Rolling Stone India describing the "Paranoia" music video

It exceeded 10 million views in two days and 20 million views in four days. Included in a list of the "21 Best Korean Music Videos of 2021", Rolling Stone India stated that Kang delivers excellence in the visual space with the music video for "Paranoia".

== Commercial performance ==
"Paranoia" is Kang's first top five single on the Gaon Digital Chart that peaked at number two for the chart issue dated February 14–20, 2021. It also marked his first solo appearance on Billboard's World Digital Song Sales chart with the single debuting at number five. According to the Korea Music Content Association, Kang received two Gaon crowns during the eighth week of 2021 in part due to "Paranoia" ranking first in the download and BGM charts. The digital single also took first place on four music shows: The Show, Show Champion, M Countdown, and Show! Music Core.

== Critical reception ==
"Paranoia" was included in an article titled "12 Meaningful K-pop Songs That Tackle Mental Health" by Cosmopolitan Philippines and a ranking titled "88 Songs That Made Our Year" by a 24-hour radio channel launched by American multinational music company, 88rising. It was also included in Dazed Digital's list of the best K-pop tracks of 2021 where Taylor Glasby said "his clean vocal reigns triumphant amongst the warped screams and horror show bass". In an in-depth review of the "10 Best K-pop Albums of 2021", Rolling Stone India described the pre-released single as "a stunning depiction of being trapped in the prison of one's own mind".

Listicles for "Paranoia"
Publication	List	Rank	Ref.
88rising Radio	88 Songs That Made Our Year	—N/a	
Cosmopolitan Philippines	12 Meaningful K-Pop Songs That Tackle Mental Health	3	
Dazed Digital	The 40 Best K-pop Tracks of 2021	27	
Rolling Stone India	21 Best Korean Music Videos of 2021	8	

== Charts ==
Chart (2021)	Peak position
South Korea (Gaon)	2
South Korea (Kpop Hot 100)	39
US World Digital Song Sales (Billboard)	5

== Accolades ==
Year	Award	Category	Result	Ref.
2021	Gaon Chart Music Awards	Song of the Year – February	Nominated	

=== Music program awards ===
Program	Date	Ref.
The Show (SBS MTV)	February 23, 2021	
Show Champion (MBC M)	February 24, 2021	
M Countdown (Mnet)	February 25, 2021	
Show! Music Core (MBC)	February 27, 2021	

== Release history ==
Region	Date	Format	Label
Various	February 16, 2021	Digital download; streaming	Konnect Entertainment; Sony Music

== See also ==
- List of K-pop songs on the Billboard charts
- List of The Show Chart winners (2021)
- List of Show Champion Chart winners (2021)
- List of M Countdown Chart winners (2021)
- List of Show! Music Core Chart winners (2021)
