= Realiez =

- Digital cover

EP by Kang Daniel
- Released: June 19, 2023
- Genre: K-pop
- Length: 16:37
- Language: Korean; English
- Label: Konnect; Sony Music
- Producer: Gingerbread; Wyatt Sanders; MZMC; Dwilly; Pink Slip; Inverness; David Schaeman; Rudy Sandapa

Kang Daniel chronology
Joy Ride (2022)	Realiez (2023)	Re8el (2023)

Kang Daniel Korean chronology
The Story: Retold (2022)	Realiez (2023)	Act (2024)

Singles from Realiez
- 1. "Wasteland" Released: June 7, 2023; 2. "SOS" Released: June 19, 2023

Music video
- "Wasteland" on YouTube "SOS" on YouTube "SOS" (Performance ver.) on YouTube

Realiez (stylized in all caps) is the fifth Korean-language extended play (EP) (sixth overall) by South Korean singer and songwriter Kang Daniel. It was released on June 19, 2023, by Konnect Entertainment and distributed by Sony Music Korea. Realiez contains five tracks, including pre-released single "Wasteland" and the EP's lead single, "SOS". The EP debuted at number five on South Korea's Circle Album Chart.

== Background and release ==
First news of the project came on May 26, 2023 when Konnect Entertainment uploaded a teaser video onto their social media channels, entitled "Kang Daniel - Prequel". The sixty second video depicted a post-apocalyptic, dystopian-style desert car chase scene, followed by an unidentified person pointing a gun at a masked Kang. The teaser video ended with a black screen displaying Bible verse Matthew 10:28, followed by a date, "2023.06.19". The EP's title was officially announced four days later, along with the start of pre-order availability. According to Kang, the title, Realiez, is a portmanteau of three words: "real", meaning truth, "lies", a lie disguised as truth, and "realize", the process of realizing the truth and lies.

On June 2, Konnect announced that "Wasteland" would be released ahead of the EP on June 7. The song, recorded entirely in English, was said to contain the central message of the album. The EP's track listing and production credits were released on June 14, confirming the lead single's title, "SOS", followed two days later by audio samples of all songs. Realiez was officially released on June 19, 2023, along with lead single "SOS" and its accompanying music video.

The EP was Kang's final release under Konnect Entertainment, which was dissolved in mid-2024 after Kang filed a criminal complaint against the company's largest shareholder for embezzlement, forgery, and fraud, among other things. Kang's next Korean EP, Act, was released under a new agency, Artistic Round Alliance (ARA).

== Composition ==
Realiez is described as a exploring a variety of genres, such as synth-pop, modern pop, rock, and grunge. The opening song, "Wasteland", is recorded entirely in English and written by Kang. The song is described as a synthpop track with a dark ambiance. The EP's lead single, "SOS", is an electronic-rock influenced track with arpeggio synthesizers, aggressive electronic guitar riffs and powerful drums. "Supernova" is a pop-rock track with funk influence. "Liar" is a pop track with "interesting" instrumentation and "spacious" sounding reverb and synths. The final track, "Dreaming", is a softer track with choir backing.

The EP explores themes of dystopia and apocalypse, which were conveyed through the graphics and visuals leading up its to release. This continued with the music video for "SOS", which was filmed in the desert near Las Vegas and was compared to Mad Max.

== Commercial performance ==
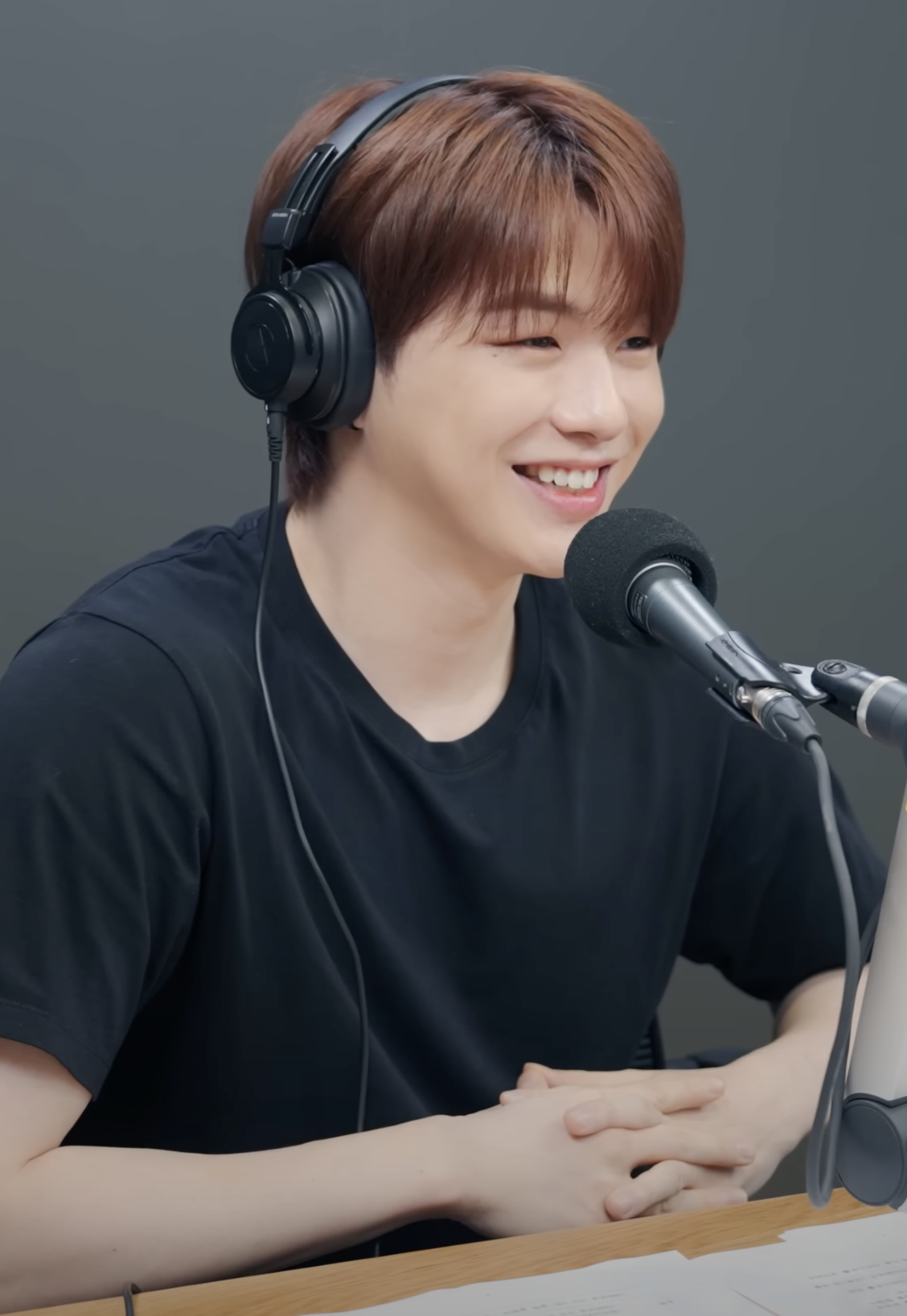
Kang promoting Realiez in an interview at SBS Power FM

Realiez debuted at number five on South Korea's Circle Album Chart for the week ending June 24. A second version of the EP also charted at number seven, for a combined total of 149,455 copies sold in the first week. On the monthly chart, the two versions of Realiez peaked at numbers seventeen and twenty-nine, respectively, for June 2023. As of August 2023, the EP has sold 169,996 copies in South Korea.

== Track listing ==
Track listing and credits adapted from the EP's liner notes.

Realiez track listing
No.	Title	Lyrics	Music	Arrangement	Length
1.	"Wasteland"	Kang Daniel; 122; HeeJ; HML	JBach; Wyatt Sanders; Barry Cohen; MZMC	Gingerbread; Sanders; MZMC	3:02
2.	"SOS"	Kang; Chancellor; Knave	Jackson Morgan; Landon Sears; David Wilson; MZMC	Dwilly; MZMC	3:11
3.	"Supernova"	Chancellor; Knave	Remy Gautreau; Jesse Fink; Anthony Russo; Kyle Buckley; Charles Nelsen; MZMC	Pink Slip; Inverness; MZMC	3:28
4.	"Liar"	Chancellor; Knave	Colin Magalong; Wilson; David Schaeman; MZMC	Dwilly; Schaeman; MZMC	3:16
5.	"Dreaming"	Chancellor; Knave	Sanders; Rudy Sandapa; MZMC	Sandapa; MZMC	3:38
Total length:					16:37

== Charts ==
=== Weekly charts ===
Weekly chart performance for Realiez
Chart (2023)	Peak position
South Korean Albums (Circle)	5 (Note: A second version of Realiez charted separately at number 9.)

=== Monthly charts ===
Monthly chart performance for Realiez
Chart (2023)	Peak position
South Korean Albums (Circle)	17 (Note: A second version of Realiez charted separately at number 29.)

== Release history ==
Release date and formats for Realiez
Region	Date	Format	Label
Various	June 19, 2023	Digital download; streaming	Konnect; Sony Music Korea
South Korea	June 19, 2023	CD	Konnect; Sony Music Korea
