= The Story (Kang Daniel album) =

- Digital cover

Studio album by Kang Daniel
- Released: May 24, 2022 (The Story); November 24, 2022 (Retold)
- Recorded: 2021–2022
- Genre: K-pop
- Length: 31:27 (The Story); 48:43 (Retold)
- Language: Korean
- Labels: Konnect; Sony Music Korea

Kang Daniel chronology
Yellow (2021)	The Story (2022)	Joy Ride (2022)

Kang Daniel Korean chronology
Yellow (2021)	The Story (2022)	Realiez (2023)

Singles from The Story
- 1. "Upside Down" Released: May 24, 2022

Reissue cover
- Digital cover

Singles from The Story: Retold
- 1. "Nirvana" Released: November 24, 2022

Music video
- "Parade" on YouTube "How We Live" on YouTube "Don't Tell" on YouTube "Nirvana" on YouTube

The Story is the debut studio album by South Korean singer and songwriter Kang Daniel. It was released on May 24, 2022, by Konnect Entertainment and distributed by Sony Music Korea. The Story contains ten tracks with "Upside Down" as its lead single. A repackage of the album, titled The Story: Retold, was released on November 24, 2022. Three new songs and two iterations were added to the track listing with "Nirvana" as its lead single.

== Background and composition ==
On May 2, 2022, Konnect Entertainment posted a surprise comeback trailer video for what would be Kang Daniel's first full-length album The Story, set for release on May 24. Two days later, pre-orders for three different versions (Arch-Plot, Anti-Plot, and Non-Plot) of the album began. Serving as the storyteller, Kang is credited as the main lyricist of all of the album's songs. Having previously revealed the purpose behind his color series as wanting to share "the different stages of self-discovery as an artist with [his] fans", Kang noted that he now feels "[his] own color has been established" through all that he has released thus far. Yellow was based on Kang's personal experiences and revolved around inner sanctity, which forced confrontation. Subsequently, The Story acts as "the balm to soothe yourself in the aftermath of laying yourself bare".

A repackage of the album, titled The Story: Retold, was released on November 24, 2022. The reissue includes five new tracks along with the original 10-song track list that is rearranged in a way that "adds completeness to the plot". Of the newly added tracks, Kang revealed during his documentary film Kang Daniel: My Parade (2023) that "Ghost" is a song dedicated to a family member (grandfather) who had died.

== Promotion ==
A press conference was held on May 24 at the Grand InterContinental Seoul Parnas for the release of Kang's first full-length album. To further commemorate the album's release, he held an album countdown V Live show on the same day as well as both offline and virtual fan-sign events. He also made an appearance on the May 27 episode of the third season of Sixth Sense with Noh Sa-yeon and the May 29 episode of MBC's Blockbuster. Following a week of promotions, Konnect announced that Kang would be taking a break after being diagnosed with spinal disc herniation due to the b-boy performance included in the music video for "Upside Down" and subsequent music show performances.

== Commercial performance ==
The Story surpassed 316,630 physical album sales within a week. Lead single "Upside Down" peaked at number two on the Gaon Digital Chart for the chart issue dated May 22 to 28 in 2022.

== Critical reception ==
Bollywood entertainment website Bollywood Hungama included the album in a list titled "20 Best B-side Korean Songs of 2022" where Nandini Lyengar said Kang "stands firm on his promise of delivering the best". In an article collecting Brazilian entertainment website Omelete's favorite albums of 2022, Kang's catalogue of music was described as having a theatrical edge that was enhanced with the release of The Story and its repackage The Story: Retold due to the composition, music video, and choreography attached to the different tracks of the album. Writing for the publication, Caio Coletti highlighted certain tracks by describing "Parade" as "a melodically mesmerizing elegy" and "Nirvana" as "evoking an intoxicating urban romance".

Professional ratings
Review scores
Source	Rating
IZM	3/5 stars

Listicle for The Story and The Story: Retold
Publication	List	Rank	Ref.
Bollywood Hungama	20 Best B-side Korean Songs of 2022	—N/a	
Omelete	Top 10 K-pop Albums of 2022	8	

== Live performances ==
Kang performed "Parade", the fourth track of the album, on the June 16 episode of The Kelly Clarkson Show as the first K-pop male solo artist to appear on the variety talk show. This marked his US television debut with host Kelly Clarkson introducing him as "one of the most successful K-pop solo acts to date".

== Track listing ==
The Story track listing
No.	Title	Lyrics	Music	Arrangement	Length
1.	"The Story"	Kang Daniel; Chancellor; Knave	Anthony Russo; Anthony Pavel; Jackson Morgan; Jonathan Hoskins; MZMC	Hoskins; MZMC	3:23
2.	"Upside Down"	Kang; Chancellor; Knave	MZMC	KillaGraham; Sean Kennedy; MZMC	3:16
3.	"Loser" (featuring Dbo)	Kang; Chancellor; B.E.D; Dbo	Brian Lee; Chancellor	Tushar Apte; Lee	3:10
4.	"Parade"	Kang; Chancellor; Knave	Wyatt Sanders; Ben Samama; MZMC	KillaGraham; MZMC	3:03
5.	"Don't Tell" (featuring Jessi)	Kang; Jessi; Han Song-yi; Roze; Ahn Yeon-joo	Russo; Pavel; Morgan; Kyle Buckley; Charles Robert Nelsen; MZMC	Pinkslip; Inverness; MZMC	3:04
6.	"Ride 4 U"	Kang; Jo Ye-ah; Young	MZMC	KillaGraham; Kennedy; MZMC	2:27
7.	"How We Live" (featuring Sokodomo)	Kang; Sokodomo; Chancellor; Knave	Morgan; Landon Sears; Barry Cohen; MZMC	Gingerbread; Morgan; MZMC	3:13
8.	"Mad" (featuring Chancellor)	Kang; Chancellor; Knave	Russo; Pavel; Kaelyn Behr; MZMC	Styalz Fuego	3:20
9.	"1000x"	Kang; Choi Ri	Russo; Pavel; Behr; MZMC	Fuego	3:10
10.	"Moment"	Kang; Chancellor; Knave; Purple	Chancellor; Purple; Knave; Jang Seong-il	Purple	3:21
Total length:					31:27

The Story: Retold track listing
No.	Title	Lyrics	Music	Arrangement	Length
1.	"Parade"	Kang; Chancellor; Knave	Sanders; Samama; MZMC	KillaGraham; MZMC	3:03
2.	"Selfish"	Chancellor	Morgan; Alex Sacco; Tony Ferrari; Kiara Elias; MZMC	Sacco; MZMC	2:50
3.	"Upside Down"	Kang; Chancellor; Knave	MZMC	KillaGraham; Kennedy; MZMC	3:16
4.	"Loser" (featuring Dbo)	Kang; Chancellor; B.E.D; Dbo	Lee; Chancellor	Apte; Lee	3:10
5.	"Don't Tell" (featuring Jessi)	Kang; Jessi; Han; Roze; Ahn	Russo; Pavel; Morgan; Buckley; Nelsen; MZMC	Pinkslip; Inverness; MZMC	3:04
6.	"Nirvana" (featuring pH-1 and WDBZ)	Kang; pH-1; Han; Kim Ban-ji; Young; Choi Ri; Ahn; Lee Ji-won; HML; Heej; 122	Russo; Pavel; Morgan; Behr; Rudy Sandapa; MZMC	Fuego; Sandapa	3:39
7.	"Ride 4 U"	Kang; Jo; Young	MZMC	KillaGraham; Kennedy; MZMC	2:27
8.	"How We Live" (featuring Sokodomo)	Kang; Sokodomo; Chancellor; Knave	Morgan; Sears; Cohen; MZMC	Gingerbread; Morgan; MZMC	3:13
9.	"Mad" (featuring Chancellor)	Kang; Chancellor; Knave	Russo; Pavel; Fuego; Behr; MZMC	Fuego	3:20
10.	"1000x"	Kang; Choi	Russo; Pavel; Behr; MZMC	Fuego	3:10
11.	"Ghost"	Kang; Roze; Young; Ahn; HML; Heej; 122	Russo; Pavel; Behr; MZMC	Russo; Fuego	3:29
12.	"Moment"	Kang; Chancellor; Knave; Purple	Chancellor; Purple; Knave; Jang	Purple	3:21
13.	"The Story"	Kang; Chancellor; Knave	Russo; Pavel; Morgan; Hoskins; MZMC	Hoskins; MZMC	3:23
14.	"Ride 4 U (Remix)"	Kang; Jo; Young; Chancellor	MZMC	KillaGraham; Kennedy; MZMC	3:39
15.	"Nirvana (Solo Ver.)"	Kang; pH-1; Han; Kim; Young; Choi; Ahn; Lee; HML; Heej; 122	Russo; Pavel; Morgan; Behr; Sandapa; MZMC	Fuego; Sandapa	3:39
Total length:					48:43

== Charts ==
=== Weekly charts ===
Weekly chart performance for The Story
Chart (2022)	Peak position
South Korean Albums (Gaon)	3

Weekly chart performance for The Story: Retold
Chart (2022)	Peak position
South Korean Albums (Circle)	2

=== Monthly charts ===
Monthly chart performance for The Story
Chart (2022)	Peak position
South Korean Albums (Gaon)	9

Monthly chart performance for The Story: Retold
Chart (2022)	Peak position
South Korean Albums (Circle)	13

=== Year-end charts ===
Year-end chart performance for The Story
Chart (2022)	Position
South Korean Albums (Circle)	93
South Korean Albums (Circle) META Album	97

== Release history ==
Release date and formats for The Story and The Story: Retold
Region	Date	Format	Version	Label
Various	May 24, 2022	Digital download; streaming	The Story	Konnect; Sony Music Korea
South Korea	May 24, 2022	CD	The Story	Konnect; Sony Music Korea
Various	November 24, 2022	Digital download; streaming	The Story: Retold	Konnect; Sony Music Korea
South Korea	November 24, 2022	CD	The Story: Retold	Konnect; Sony Music Korea
