= Kang Daniel =

South Korean singer (born 1996)

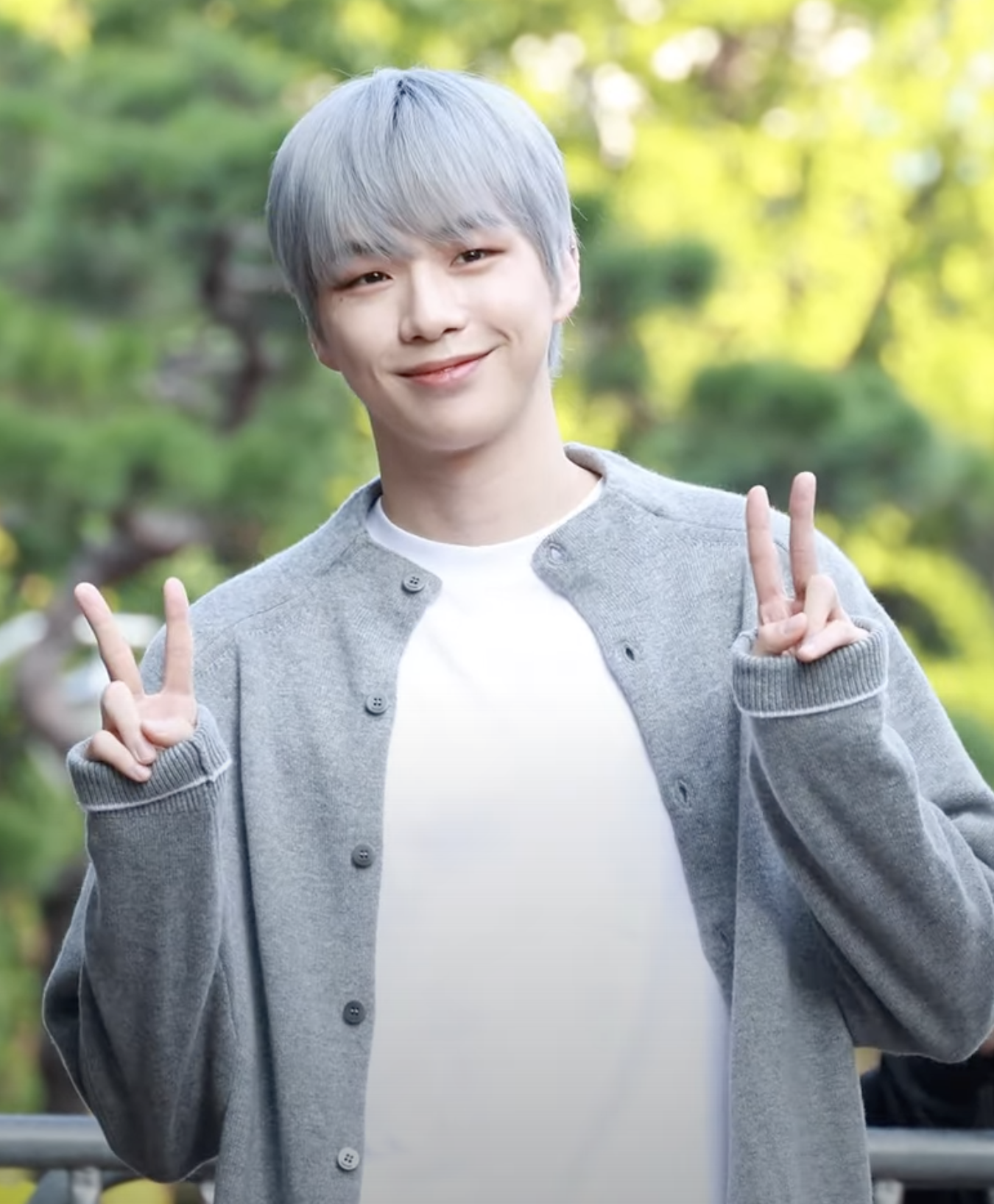
- Kang in September 2024
- Born: Kang Eui-geon; December 10, 1996 (age 29); Busan, South Korea
- Education: Kyung Hee Cyber University
- Occupations: Singer; songwriter; actor; model; television host; businessman; philanthropist
- Years active: 2017–present
- Title: Founder and CEO of Konnect Entertainment (2019–2024)
- Musical career
- Genre: K-pop
- Instrument: Vocals
- Labels: MMO; YMC (Note: As a member of Wanna One only.); Swing; LM (Note: Contract was disputed before it went into effect in February 2019, suspended, and legally terminated in September 2019.); Konnect; Warner Music Japan; ARA
- Formerly of: Wanna One
- Website: kangdaniel.bstage.in

Korean name
- Hangul: 강다니엘
- RR: Gang Daniel
- MR: Kang Taniel

Former name
- Hangul: 강의건
- RR: Gang Uigeon
- MR: Kang Ŭigŏn

Kang Daniel (Korean: 강다니엘; born Kang Eui-geon, December 10, 1996), stylized as KANGDANIEL, is a South Korean singer-songwriter, actor, television host, and businessman who rose to fame in early 2017 as the first-place winner of the second season of reality competition series Produce 101. He is a former member of the show's resulting boy group Wanna One that, at the time, was a major power player in the K-pop industry.

Following the end of Wanna One's activities as a group, Kang took a six-month hiatus from the entertainment industry and took over management of his career. In mid-2019, he released his solo debut extended play (EP), Color on Me, which was a commercial success that topped South Korea's Gaon Album Chart. His subsequent works from his color series titled Cyan (2020) and Magenta (2020) also topped the Gaon Album Chart with the former's title track earning Kang his first domestic top ten single. Further solidifying his career as a solo artist, Kang earned his first top five single in Korea as well as his first solo appearance on Billboard's World Digital Song Sales chart through the single "Paranoia". He then released the third and final chapter of his "color trilogy", Yellow (2021), which topped the Gaon Album Chart and contained his first domestic number one single titled "Antidote".

Alongside his music career, Kang appeared as the host of Mnet's Street Woman Fighter (2021), the spin-off show Street Dance Girls Fighter (2021–2022), the one-episode television special titled Be Mbitious (2022) in addition to Street Man Fighter (2022) as well as Street Woman Fighter 2 (2023). He also made his acting debut through the first-ever Korean Disney+ Star original series, Rookie Cops (2022). His other ventures include establishing an independent entertainment company named Konnect Entertainment to manage his own career, expanding to manage other artists prior to its dissolution in 2024.

Kang is the recipient of numerous accolades including four Seoul Music Awards, one Melon Music Award, one Circle Chart Music Award, and a Guinness World Record. His acting debut also earned him various accolades including two Asia Artist Awards, one Blue Dragon Series Award, and a Seoul International Drama Award. He has made the Gallup Korea list of Most Preferred Idols in 2017, 2018, and 2019, the Forbes Korea Power Celebrity 40 list in 2019 and 2022, and appeared on People's list of talented emerging artists making their mark in 2022. In the same year, Kang was the recipient of the Seoul Mayor's Award for Culture due to his great contribution to the rise of Seoul's awareness by promoting the Korean Wave in various fields.

== Early life and education ==
Kang Daniel was born as Kang Eui-geon (강의건) in Busan, South Korea as the only child of his family. After spending his childhood and most of his teen years with his birth name, he decided to legally change it to Daniel due to family and friends having difficulty pronouncing Eui-geon. On an episode of MBC's Radio Star, Kang cited a biblical figure as his source of inspiration for the name Daniel. He began dancing in eighth grade through a b-boy club he joined following a teacher's suggestion and later attended a dance academy in Busan called Nataraja Academy. Following this, Kang participated in a youth dance competition titled "Busan Kids" where he and his teammate won against competitors such as Jimin (who would later become a member of BTS) and Park Woo-jin (who would later become a fellow member of Wanna One). During a guest appearance at variety show Hello Counselor, Kang revealed that he was ostracized in elementary school because of his appearance and developed passion and built self-esteem through dancing. To further pursue this passion, he attended Peniel Arts High School where he studied modern dance for a year with a focus on ballet and won a gold medal in the dance category at the 49th High School Performing Arts Contest. Having been raised in a single parent household, Kang revealed that the "tuition [at his arts high school] was really expensive" for his mother who, at the time, was not feeling healthy. This led to him dropping out of high school shortly after enrolling and later receiving the Korean equivalent of a General Educational Development (GED) credential.

In mid-2018, Kang enrolled in the Department of Applied Music at Kyung Hee Cyber University.

== Career ==
=== Early career ===
Prior to appearing on Produce 101 Season 2, Kang had trained for two years and one month. He initially started as a trainee under B2M Entertainment until the company's acquisition and then became a trainee under MMO Entertainment. Throughout this training period, Kang did not receive dance or singing lessons due to both company's financial instability. One of the most notable moments during his time as a trainee was his appearance on Her Secret Weapon, performing "Invitation" by Uhm Jung-hwa, where he served as a backup dancer to Fiestar's Cao Lu and Spica's Sihyun.

=== 2017–2018: Produce 101 and Wanna One ===
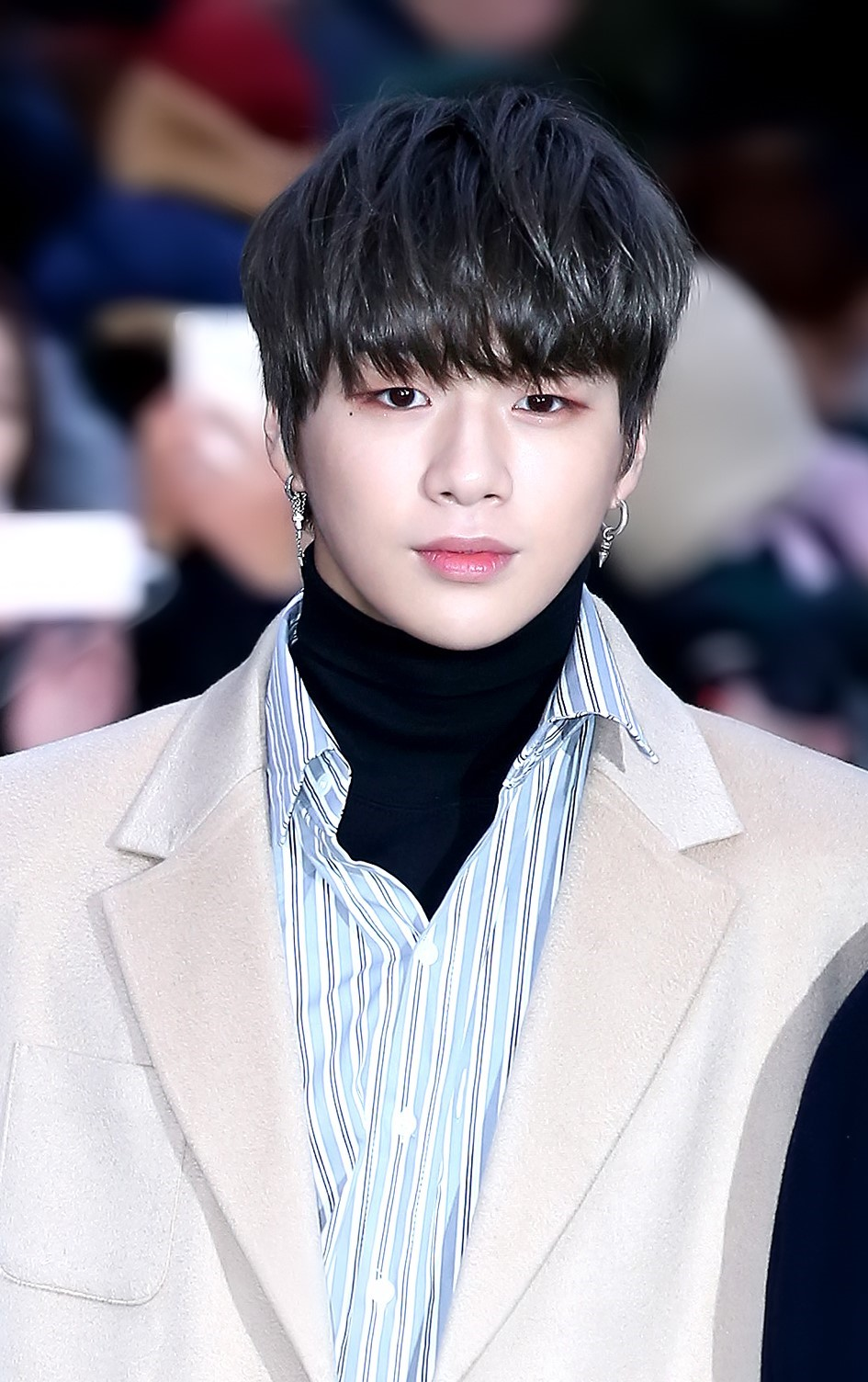
Kang Daniel in 2017

In 2017, Kang was one of the five contestants who represented MMO Entertainment on the second season of Mnet's Produce series. He is known for finishing first in the final episode of the survival show and becoming the center of the temporary boy group Wanna One that was initially managed by YMC Entertainment and later managed by Swing Entertainment. Kang's most notable moment on the show was his signature dance move that was re-enacted by many such as the cast of Running Man, the cast of Saturday Night Live Korea (SNL Korea), and other celebrities such as Rain. He officially debuted with Wanna One during Wanna One Premier Show-Con on August 7, at the Gocheok Sky Dome, with the debut extended play (EP) 1×1=1 (To Be One). During the preparation for this debut, Kang was confirmed to join the pilot season of MBC's It's Dangerous Beyond The Blankets which premiered on August 27. In the same month, he was featured on the cover of Weekly Chosun magazine, one of the major news and current events publications in South Korea, with an article focusing on his popularity among the general public. Following the conclusion of promotions for the EP, Kang was chosen as the first male celebrity to appear on the cover of InStyle Korea fashion magazine in its 14-year history for its October 2017 issue. He was also signed as a cast member for SBS's newly launched variety show Master Key, for which he was awarded the variety rookie award at the 2017 SBS Entertainment Awards.

Kang was involved in several prominent solo activities the following year, most notably as the main model for Davichi's "Days Without You" (너 없는 시간들) music video and as a continuing cast member on the second season of MBC's It's Dangerous Beyond the Blankets. He was later awarded the variety rookie award at the 2018 MBC Entertainment Awards for his work at the respective show. He also continued to promote with Wanna One, including as a part of Wanna One's unit "Triple Position" which won the Best Unit Award at the 2018 Mnet Asian Music Awards for the single "Kangaroo". Although he concluded his contract with Wanna One on December 31, he still appeared with the group until its official farewell concerts that were held at the Gocheok Sky Dome between January 24 to 27 of the following year.

=== 2019: Solo debut with Color on Me ===
On January 31, 2019, it was reported that Kang would move to LM Entertainment after the end of his activities with Wanna One. On March 21, it was further reported that Kang submitted an application to suspend his exclusive contract with LM. His legal representative revealed that LM Entertainment had signed joint business contracts that sold Kang's exclusive contract rights to third parties without his prior consent. On May 10, the Seoul Central District Court ruled in favor of Kang, allowing the suspension of his contract and his pursuit of individual activities as a celebrity without any interference from the company. The following month, Kang was reported to have established his own agency Konnect Entertainment for his future activities. LM Entertainment's first appeal regarding the contract suspension was rejected by the Seoul Central District Court on July 11.

Kang officially debuted as a solo artist on July 25 with the debut EP, Color on Me. As reflected on Hanteo Chart, the EP set records for both the highest first-day and first-week physical sales for a solo artist since the chart's inception at the time. Its lead single "What Are You Up To" gave Kang his first-ever solo music show win on KBS2's Music Bank on August 9. He kicked off promotions for the EP with six different fan-sign events held across Korea between July 31 and August 3. Following this, Kang embarked on the first fan meet tour of his solo career, touring six different cities: Singapore, Bangkok, Taipei, Kuala Lumpur, and Manila, before ending in Seoul on November 24. In the midst of touring, he also hosted his own radio show on NOW., Naver's online audio streaming service. The Kang Daniel Show aired on Chuseok holiday with a total of four episodes released each day from September 11 to 14; with Gray making a guest appearance on the third episode. In the same month, it was announced that Kang's contract with LM was officially terminated as both sides came to a mutual agreement. Serving as his first comeback, Kang released two digital singles on November 25 called "Touchin'" and "Adulthood". Unlike his solo debut, Kang was able to promote "Touchin'" by performing the song on several Korean music shows and won a trophy on SBS MTV's The Show on December 3. However, after a week of promoting, Konnect announced that Kang would take a break to focus on his health.

=== 2020–2021: Cyan, Magenta, Yellow, and MC ventures ===
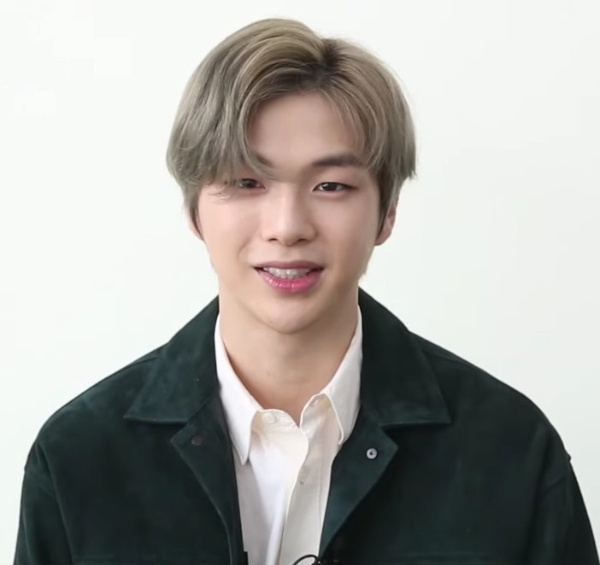
Kang Daniel in 2020

In 2020, Kang returned to scheduled activities with travel reality show Hello, Daniel which premiered on March 4. Twenty days later, he released his second EP Cyan as the first installment of his "color trilogy" project. Its lead single "2U" gave Kang his first top ten track in Korea along with several trophies on music shows: The Show, Music Bank, Show! Music Core, Show Champion, and M Countdown. Prior to the release of Cyan, it was revealed that Kang and Zico would release a song together as part of the Pepsi and Starship Entertainment collaboration project named "For the Love of Korea". Their joint single "Refresh" was co-produced by Steve Aoki and released on April 23. The following month, he participated in 88rising's Asia Rising Forever and the TikTok Stage online concert. On June 19, Kang released his first-ever drama OST titled "Something" through SBS's romantic comedy Backstreet Rookie. He also joined the lineup for KCON:TACT 2020 Summer and the Pepsi Online Showcase, for which he hosted the opening and later performed as Pepsi's global K-pop partner. To celebrate the first anniversary of his solo debut, Kang held an online fan meeting on July 25 via ten streaming platforms worldwide. This made him the first Korean celebrity to have a fan meeting broadcast live through China's local platform since the country's ban on Korean culture began in 2016.

The second installment of his "color trilogy" project and third EP Magenta was released on August 3. With this release, Kang surpassed one million cumulative albums sold within 13 months of debuting as a solo artist. The lead single "Who U Are" peaked at number 12 in Korea and won trophies on SBS MTV's The Show, KBS2's Music Bank, and MBC's Show! Music Core. Two months later, Kang performed on a special episode of MBC's I Live Alone for the 2021 Summer/Spring Seoul Fashion Week. In November, Konnect opened pre-orders for Kang's first artbook Never Standing Still - It's Time to Shine in collaboration with Paul McCartney's personal photographer, MJ Kim.

As his first American collaboration, Kang was featured on "State of Wonder" by Inverness alongside Anthony Russo. The single was released by Monstercat on January 15, 2021. He then released the digital single "Paranoia" on February 16 which gave Kang his first top five track that peaked at number two in Korea and won trophies on several music shows including: The Show, Show Champion, M Countdown, and Show! Music Core. It also marked his first solo appearance on Billboard's World Digital Song Sales chart with the single debuting at number five. Leading up to his next EP, Kang was featured on YouTube Originals seven-episode documentary series K-Pop Evolution which premiered on March 31. He then released his fourth overall EP Yellow on April 13 as the final installment of his three-part project aimed to find his true colors as a solo artist. Its lead single "Antidote" gave Kang his first number one track in Korea along with several trophies on music shows: The Show, Show Champion, Music Bank, Show! Music Core, and Inkigayo. Discussing what this project represents, Kang said "The color series is really about sharing the different stages of self-discovery as an artist with my fans". On May 13, Kang released the promotional single "Outerspace" featuring Loco through Universe Music for the mobile application, Universe.

In celebration of his second anniversary as a solo artist, Kang held a virtual reality (VR) fan meeting on July 25. In the same month, Kang was selected as the fixed MC for Mnet's first-ever female dance crew competition show Street Woman Fighter. His background in breakdancing and first-hand knowledge of street dance culture were qualifications cited by the show's producer for selecting him as the official host. In September 2021, Kang was featured on Japanese musician Miyavi's "Hush Hush" from the studio album Imaginary. He also joined the lineup for "Cyworld BGM 2021", a large-scale project to remake the top 100 BGM songs that were most popular on the Cyworld platform in the 2000s. As the 14th track of the project, Kang and his labelmate Chancellor released a remake of Epik High's "Fly" on November 16. That same month, Kang was re-selected as the fixed MC for the spin-off show Street Dance Girls Fighter. In December, he reunited with nine other members of Wanna One for a special performance at the 2021 Mnet Asian Music Awards that included a new single by the group titled "Beautiful (Part.3)".

=== 2022–present: Acting debut, The Story, and concert tour ===
Prior to the release of "Paranoia", it was revealed that Kang was offered to star in the first-ever Korean Disney+ Star original series titled Rookie Cops. His role as Wi Seung-hyun in the coming-of-age story marked his official debut as an actor, starring alongside Chae Soo-bin. Having previously turned down several offers to appear in Korean dramas, Kang revealed that the idea of working alongside people his age persuaded him to give the show's proposal a try. He released the Korean version of his Japanese collaboration single "Hush Hush" featuring Miyavi on March 9 as part of the series soundtrack. The following month, Kang performed his lead single "Antidote" on the Recording Academy's Press Play At Home as the first K-pop solo artist to appear on the series. On April 29, he released the promotional single "Ready to Ride" through Universe Music for the mobile application, Universe.

Following the end of his "color trilogy", Kang released his first full-length album The Story on May 24, 2022. Its lead single "Upside Down" peaked at number two in Korea and won a trophy on MBC's Show! Music Core on June 4. Performing the album's fourth track "Parade", Kang made his US television debut on the June 16 episode of The Kelly Clarkson Show. Following the release of The Story, it was revealed that Kang would release a song as part of the Gatorade and Starship Entertainment campaign named "Everyday Athlete" alongside Yuna Kim and Ive's An Yu-jin. Their joint single "Move like This" was released on June 20. Two months later, Kang embarked on the first concert tour of his solo career, performing in multiple different cities throughout Asia, Europe, and North America between August 2022 and April 2023 before ending off with encore concerts in Seoul on July 1 and 2. Continuing the series, he initially hosted the one-episode television special Be the SMF that preceded Street Man Fighter and was later confirmed as the fixed MC for Mnet's Street Man Fighter. He released the single "Remember Us" on August 23 as part of the show's soundtrack. He then made his Japanese debut under Warner Music Japan with the release of his Joy Ride EP on October 5 supported by the digital single "TPIR" featuring Miyavi. Following this, a repackage of his first full-length album titled The Story: Retold was released on November 24. Selected by KBS as a representative of Korea, Kang participated in the 2022 ABU TV Song Festival held in New Delhi, India. In December, he released an OST titled "Last Forever" through TVING's comedy Work Later, Drink Now 2 and also served as a judge on the second season of Mr. Trot.

As his first English-language single, Kang released "Look Where We Are" with 220 Kid and Willim on January 26, 2023. Held in Las Vegas, Kang performed at the We Bridge Music Festival and participated in the three-day exposition hosted by the Grammy Museum on April 21. He then released his fifth Korean EP Realiez on June 19 and performed at the 2023 Summer Sonic Festival on August 19 and 20. In the same month, Kang returned as the fixed MC of Street Woman Fighter 2. His documentary film titled Kang Daniel: My Parade that followed him through his first world tour with concert footage, behind-the-scenes rehearsals, and exclusive interviews was released in movie theaters around the world on August 30 and September 2.

In July 2024, after the dissolution of Konnect Entertainment, Kang announced that he had signed a new exclusive contract with ARA (Artistic Round Alliance). Kang's first project under the new agency, an EP entitled Act, was released on September 23. After a performing two concerts in Seoul in October 2024, Kang embarked on his second world tour in 2025, starting with Asia and Europe.

On June 16, 2025, Kang released EP Glow to Haze, which marked the first time he was credited in song composition and production. Kang continued the second act of his world tour with a two-day Seoul encore concert in August, followed by stops in North America and South America in September. Ahead of his enlistment, Kang released an English-language EP Pulsephase on December 12 and held a fan concert on December 13 and 14. Kang's second documentary film Kang Daniel: Hold Your Breath followed him throughout his Act tour and was released in domestic CGV movie theaters in January 2026.

== Personal life ==
=== Military service ===
Kang enlisted for his mandatory military service as an active duty soldier on February 9, 2026. After completing basic training at the Korea Army Training Center, Kang served as an assistant training instructor. On October 1–5, he performed for Ground Forces Festival (also known as Army Fest), held in Gyeryong, South Chungcheong Province.

== Impact ==
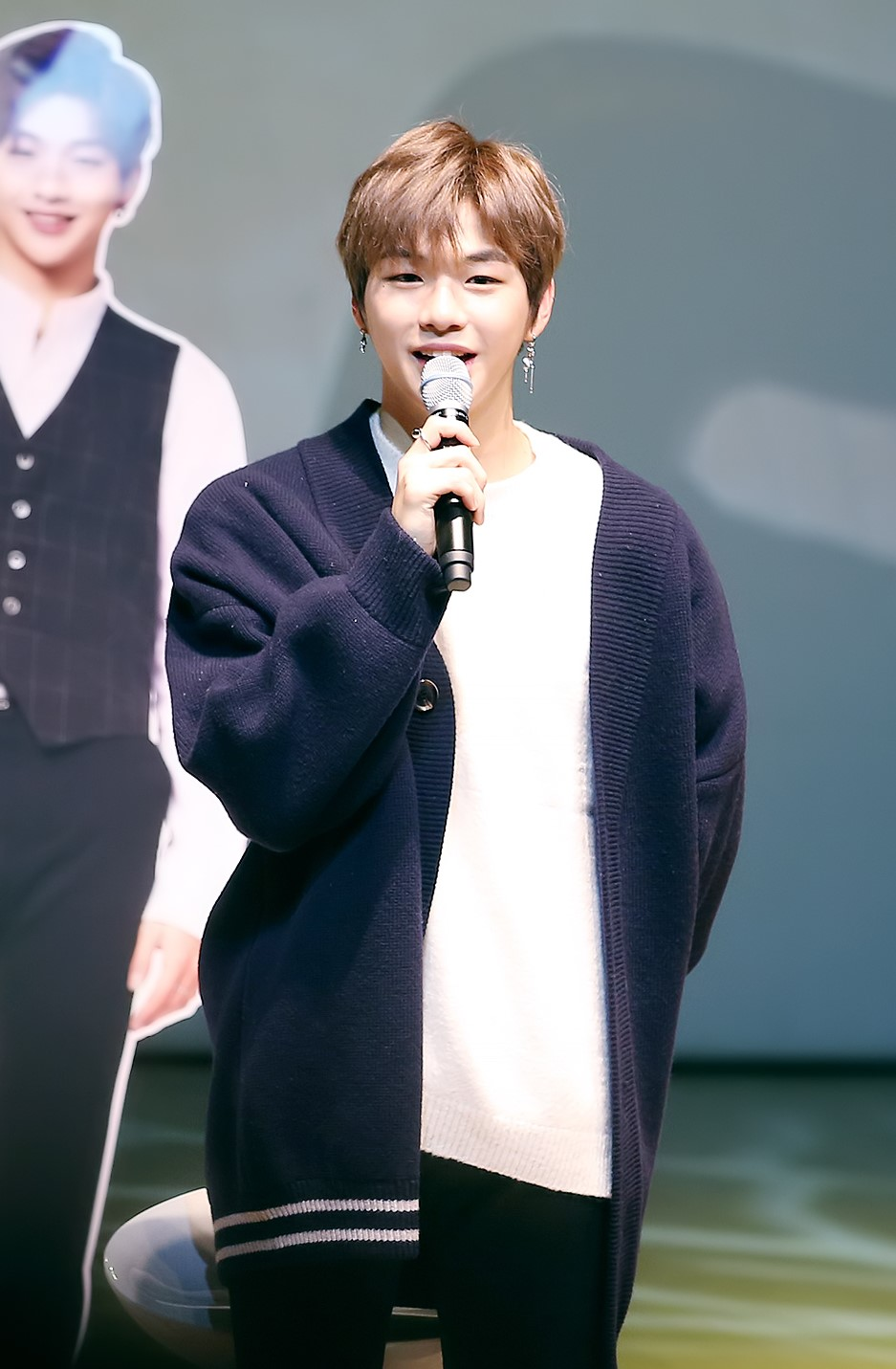
Kang Daniel at Think Nature fan meet on January 6, 2018

Kang's domestic popularity as the center of the temporary boy group Wanna One earned him the nickname "Nation's Center". Writing for Billboard, Jessica Oak noted that "Kang Daniel has elevated himself to a top-tier celebrity status that only a handful of artists can ever achieve" and further described him as "one of the highest-earning and most significant male solo acts in K-pop". In a segment dedicated to his domestic popularity, SBS's Late Night Entertainment News described him as "more than a top idol star" and additionally noted that "he created a craze" that was recreated in an episode of SNL Korea. In February 2018, Kang was appointed to be an honorary ambassador for the special Korean cultural exhibit at the 2018 Pyeongchang Olympics. The following year, he was appointed the honorary ambassador of Busan as a result of a citizen-voted poll. A formal ceremony was held on July 9, 2019, at the Sajik Baseball Stadium where he received a mandate from the mayor of the city and threw the ceremonial first pitch for the Lotte Giants' home game. In October 2020, Kang participated in the 4352nd anniversary ceremony of Korea's National Foundation Day held by the Korean government at Gyeongbokgung as the only singer invited among 30 national figures including the prime minister of South Korea.

His national influence was further seen as South Korean Olympic medalists Kim Kyeong-Ae, Lee Da-bin, and Hyun Jung-hwa declared themselves fans of the artist. An Shinae of South Korean doo-wop trio The Barberettes also divulged that Kang was the inspiration for their lead single "Shoo" . During an interview with Netflix Korea, Sweet Home actress Park Gyu-young revealed that she was inspired by Kang's pink hair color while he was on the second season of Mnet's Produce series for her character Yoon Ji-soo. Other artists who have cited him as an influence or role model include Psy, dance crew Mis Molly's Lee Seo-yeon who appeared on Mnet's Street Dance Girls Fighter, and Boys Planet contestant Mun Jung-hyun.

In January 2019, Kang set a Guinness World Record for the "fastest time to gain one million followers on Instagram" (11 hours and 36 minutes after joining). Later that month, his official Daum fancafe became the fastest in history among idols and idol groups to reach 100,000 members, doing so in under 40 hours. He then became the first male celebrity, globally, to front a campaign for Givenchy Beauty after being chosen as its brand ambassador. Kang has also been recognized for his marketing power, having topped the Korean Business Research Institute's 'Male Model Brand Power Ranking' and 'Individual Boy Group Members Brand Power Ranking'; becoming the first artist in history to spend 13 consecutive months at the top of the latter. His name has appeared in multiple other listicles such as Gallup Korea's annual list of 'Most Preferred Idols', People's list of 'Talented Emerging Artists Making Their Mark', and the annual lists titled '2030 Power Leaders' and 'Korea Power Celebrities' by Forbes Korea. He was included in Naver TV's 'Most Popular Videos of 2017', occupying six of the top ten clips based on video plays and four of the top ten clips based on likes. Two years later, Naver TV once again included him in its 'Most Popular Videos of 2019' with four of his videos making the top ten list based on video plays.

His influence is further seen through webtoons as the writer of Ideal Relationship (이상적인 관계) confirmed that Kang was the inspiration behind the character Noah's physical appearance. During an interview in May 2020, the creator of webtoon Eleceed (일렉시드) also revealed that Kang was the inspiration behind the main character Seo Jiwoo. Additionally, the author of webtoon Daddy Goes to School (급식아빠) divulged that he used Kang as a reference when developing the character Hong Jeho. JoyNews24 placed Kang at number five on its 'Power People of 2019' survey among industry professionals and, in the same year, he was selected as the third most-preferred advertising model by female consumers in their 10s in a survey conducted by the Korean Broadcast Advertising Corporation. In March 2021, he surpassed 150 consecutive weeks at the top of Idol Chart, making him the first and only artist to achieve this. The first episode of Kang's travel reality show Hello, Daniel caused a surge in sales for the travel guide If You Want to Live in Portland and led to increased success for the publishing company.

== Other ventures ==
=== Business ===
In June 2019, Kang established two companies named Konnect Entertainment and KD Corporation Ltd. as the chief executive officer (CEO) of both. His activities in the entertainment industry are managed by the former, while all other business-related activities are managed by the latter. Further business ventures through these companies include: a cafe on the first floor of Konnect Entertainment's building called Cafe de Konnect, the development and launch of mobile application "Kang Daniel" to serve as Kang's official fancafe, a collaboration with South Korean game development company Dalcomsoft to release the rhythm game Superstar Kang Daniel as the first app in the series exclusively made for a solo artist, a partnership agreement with Very Cherry to domestically manage solo artist CL, and a collaboration with production company Snowballs to release the puzzle game app Starway Kang Daniel. Expanding its lineup of artists, singer-songwriter and producer Chancellor, former GFriend member Yuju, and dance crew We Dem Boyz (WDBZ) that appeared on Street Man Fighter each signed exclusive contracts with Konnect Entertainment. Konnect Entertainment was dissolved in June 2024 amid a legal dispute between Kang and a major shareholder of the company.

In 2025, Kang joined as co-creative director of Eyetist, a contact lens brand created in partnership with Hyomin and lifestyle brand Wiggle Wiggle. Eyetist, a portmanteau of "eye" and "artist", has the concept of collaborating with various artists and intellectual property to create custom products. Artists are directly involved from product planning and co-designing the content. Eyetist's launch collaborations included himself, Hyomin, and Omniscient Reader's Viewpoint characters Kim Dokja and Yoo Joonghyuk.

=== Endorsements ===
Kang became one of the highest-valued celebrities in South Korea's advertisement industry a year after debuting, reportedly making ₩300 million (USD$250,000) per three-month contract and ₩1 billion ($860,000) per one-year contract. He has maintained numerous endorsement deals in various industries throughout his career.

In September 2017, Kang signed his first sole advertising contract as the model for Think Nature and increased the brand's online sales by 728%. Two months later, he was chosen as the model for The Spring Home and earned the company over ₩20 million ($16,645) in 10 minutes during a customized sales event. The following year, Kang worked as a brand model for fashion brand Los Angeles Project (LAP), the world's leading producer of soju (HiteJinro), electronics company Bokuk, and eyewear brand Kissing Heart. In July 2019, Kang became the model for South Korean telephone company, KT Corporation, advertising the Samsung Galaxy Note 10 Aura Red. Their collaboration generated the sale of 68,000 units and raised KT's pre-booking record by a total of 45%. In the same year, Kang became the face of restaurant chain Mexicana Chicken, brand ambassador for Givenchy Beauty, advertisement model for Subway Korea's signature wraps, and face of Calvin Klein Jeans. In October 2019, luggage brand Rimowa unveiled its new collection with Kang through photos and videos on Elle Korea and Esquire Korea.

In January 2020, Kang became the new brand ambassador for German sportswear brand Puma. Later that month, Puma and Kang's first collaboration "RS-X Cube" was released as a part of Puma's RS (Running System) collection. In February 2020, Kang collaborated with KakaoTalk's emoticon service, Kakao Friends. Designed by Kang himself, the collaboration line "Apeach Kang Daniel Edition" (inspired by his resemblance to Kakao Friends Muzi Series character Apeach and his own nickname "Baby Peach") featured goods that were officially released in Korea and globally on February 7 and 21. Kakao Friends also released a limited-edition beverage and dessert menu for three cafes, including Kang's Cafe de Konnect. Puma and Kang's second collaboration "RS 2.0" was released in August 2020 as a part of Puma's RS collection. In the same month, he also became the model for cure-cosmetic brand Icepray. In December 2020, Givenchy Beauty announced that Kang would continue to be its official model for another year and divulged its best selling item in 2020 as the Teint Couture Cushion (also known as the Kang Daniel Cushion).

In January 2021, Kang was selected as the brand ambassador for global beauty brand Mernel. Later that month, Mexicana Chicken announced that Kang would continue to be the face of its restaurant chain for another year by confirming the extension of his modeling contract. He also expanded his activities as the brand ambassador of Givenchy Beauty by modeling the brand's newly launched perfume collection. In January 2022, Kang released a collection in collaboration with Wonderwall ArtLab and was selected as the brand ambassador for skincare brand Bio Heal. As the first-ever K-pop act to collaborate with SpongeBob SquarePants, an animated character of Kang was produced along with various collaborative merchandise that was released in June 2022. Two months later, cosmetics brand The BoiBoy selected him as one of the "three top stars" to be an official model. In March 2023, Kang was chosen as a model for South Korean fashion brand SPAO, under the E-Land Group.

=== Fashion and modelling ===
Industry officials in South Korea have said "even if the fashion industry is in a slump, Kang Daniel as a model can still make others spend money", revealing that his fee was the highest among rising stars. Following his debut, he was highly sought after by luxury brands and has since collaborated with and endorsed several such as Chanel, Louis Vuitton, Calvin Klein, and Cartier.

In January 2018, two months after Kang was seen wearing a duffel coat designed by LAP to the Incheon International Airport, it was announced that he became the official model of the fashion brand. A spokesperson from the brand stated, "after Kang Daniel wore our coat, the response we received was really positive" and that "the product was sold out immediately". LAP further launched a separate streetwear line named "Kang Daniel's Pick – Edition" to better align with his personal style; the collection's popularity resulted in long lines at the Daniel's Pick LAP pop-up stores in Japan and Korea. Later that year, Kang was chosen as the newest muse for Chanel Fine Jewelry, making him the second Korean male celebrity to take on the role after BigBang's G-Dragon. In his first collaboration with the brand, he was the cover model for the July issue of Elle Korea magazine where he modeled an assortment of Chanel 'Fine Jewelry' and 'Watches'.

In March 2019, Kang returned to the cover of Elle Korea as Louis Vuitton's new style icon. He and actress Bae Doona were chosen to lead the campaign for Louis Vuitton's Twist handbag; the campaign was released through photos and videos on Elle Korea and the brand's official website one week ahead of the opening of the Louis Vuitton Twist Bag pop-up store in Seoul. Marking the end of summer and acting as an annual reset for the fashion industry, September issues have historically been considered the biggest fashion moment of the year for magazines. In September 2019, Kang was chosen to be the cover model for the prestigious September issues of fashion magazines Arena Homme+ Korea and Vogue Korea. For his two-version Arena Homme+ Korea cover, Kang modeled pieces from Cartier's Juste un Clou collection as a new member of the "Maison Cartier" ambassador group; according to the magazine, pre-order sales skyrocketed at the news of him being on the cover. Kang was also chosen as a model for Calvin Klein Jeans for its special 50th anniversary celebration. Their collaboration was seen on the October 2019 issue of High Cut fashion magazine, where Kang was the cover model on four different versions and sported Calvin Klein Jeans apparel.

Marking his runway debut in August 2023, Kang appeared as a model for the BAPE 2024 Spring/Summer Japan Runway Show as part of the brand's 30th anniversary.

=== Philanthropy ===
On June 12, 2018, Kang participated in the Ice Bucket Challenge to promote ALS awareness and also donated ₩2 million ($1,730). Two days later, the Seungil Hope Foundation reported its website crashed due to exceeded traffic and there were nearly a thousand donations since Kang participated in the challenge. In November 2018, photographer Cho Sei-hon selected Jung Woo-sung and Kang Daniel as two people he thought had positive influence in South Korea for his last Letter from Angels exhibition, a 16-year adoption awareness campaign. Two weeks after Kang was revealed as the exhibition portrait model, Cho divulged the orphan photographed with Kang was adopted. On December 10, 2018, Kang donated ₩12.1 million ($10,400) for his birthday to the Miral Welfare Foundation to be used for low-income vulnerable groups' medical bills and living expenses.

In response to the April Goseong Fire of 2019, Kang donated ₩30 million ($26,000) to Hope Bridge Disaster Relief. Hope Bridge reported in May the donations made in Kang's name amounted to ₩180 million ($155,000). It was then reported that in under three years, the money donated to various charity organizations in his name by his fan club amounted to ₩680 million ($569,907). In early December, Kang recorded ringtone services with KT for people with hearing or speech impairments for International Day of People with Disabilities (IDPWD). Ahead of Christmas, Kang donated ₩30 million in his fan club's name to The Snail of Love, a social welfare group for the deaf and hard of hearing.

On February 28, 2020, Kang made a personal donation of ₩50 million ($41,000) to Hope Bridge Disaster Relief to be used to purchase goods such as health masks and hand sanitizers to prevent the spread of COVID-19. After Konnect was contacted to confirm the news, Kang stated through his agency, "I wanted to be a little help to medical staff who are struggling." On April 17, Kang went to The Snail of Love's office to visit the first of ten children who will receive a cochlear implant under the auspices of his and his fan club's names and provided her with gifts. A ceremony was held due to their combined donations exceeding ₩99 million ($81,000).

== Discography ==
- The Story (2022)

== Concert tours ==
- First Parade (2022–2023)
- Act (2025)

== Filmography ==
- Rookie Cops (2022)
- Kang Daniel: My Parade (2023)
- Kang Daniel: Hold Your Breath (2026)
