= Konnect Entertainment =

South Korean entertainment company

- Native name: 커넥트 엔터테인먼트
- Company type: Private
- Industry: Entertainment; Retail
- Genre: K-pop
- Founded: June 5, 2019; 7 years ago
- Founder: Kang Daniel
- Defunct: June 9, 2024; 2 years ago
- Headquarters: 7 Eonju-ro 159-gil, Apgujeong-dong, Gangnam-gu, Seoul, South Korea
- Key people: Kang Daniel (CEO); Kim Tae-yeop (Vice president); Bong Sae-rom (Director)
- Services: Music production; Publishing; Artist management
- Number of employees: 16 (As of February 14, 2021) (Note: Note that this does not include Kang's A&R team or his backup dancers.)
- Parent: KD Corporation Ltd.
- Website: konnectent.com at the Wayback Machine (archived September 13, 2024)

Konnect Entertainment (Korean: 커넥트 엔터테인먼트; stylized as KONNECT Entertainment) was an independent South Korean entertainment company founded on June 5, 2019 by Kang Daniel. The company was based in the Gangnam District of Seoul in South Korea. It previously managed solo artists Kang Daniel, Chancellor, and Yuju. It was also home to dance crew We Dem Boyz (WDBZ).

== History ==
=== 2019–2020: Founding and beginnings ===
Konnect Entertainment was founded on June 5, 2019 as a one-man agency for and by Kang Daniel. The name "Konnect" is a fusion of the words "Korea" and "connect", which reveals his goal to connect Korea to the rest of the world through his future activities.

Immediately after the disbandment of temporary boy group Wanna One, it was revealed that Kang was in a legal dispute with his former agency due to the transfer of his exclusive contract rights to third parties without his prior consent. This dispute resulted in his six-month hiatus from the entertainment industry until the Seoul Central District Court ruled in his favor, allowing the suspension of his contract. This ruling meant that he could pursue individual entertainment activities without any interference from his former agency. After receiving help from multiple experts as well as his lawyers, Kang established both KD Corporation Ltd. and Konnect Entertainment. A representative from the agency revealed that:

"Kang decided to go in the direction of establishing a one-man agency after considering every possible angle in terms of what agency structure would best suit his long-term activities. His decision was also heavily influenced by the fact that he wanted to return to his fans, who had waited for a long time, as quickly as possible."

During the comeback show for his second EP that aired on Mnet and M2 channels, Kang revealed that his dance team at Konnect Entertainment partially consists of friends that he has known since before his debut. As for KD Corporation Ltd., plans to branch out into various business directions in the future were announced. In February 2020, a cafe on the first floor of Konnect Entertainment's building in the Gangnam District of Seoul called Cafe de Konnect officially opened for business. It held a fan-only event on February 19 and 20 before opening to the public on the following day. The fan event allowed 100 fans to claim a free drink after showing their membership card from Kang's official fancafe on a first-come, first-served basis. In the same month, Kakao Friends released a limited-edition beverage and dessert menu as part of its collaboration line with Kang for three cafes including Cafe de Konnect.

=== 2021–2022: Business expansion ===
In February 2021, Konnect Entertainment announced that it would launch a mobile application for Kang's official fancafe which had previously been located on the company's official website. The app was released for free for iOS on the Apple App Store and for Android on the Google Play Store on March 30, 2021. This marked the first time an artist in Korea had ever released their own app. Developed by Konnect and titled "Kang Daniel", the social networking service has an automatic translation function with 10 translatable languages including: Korean, English, Simplified Chinese, Traditional Chinese, Japanese, Indonesian, Malay, Spanish, Portuguese, and Thai. In August 2021, it was announced that singer-songwriter and producer Chancellor had signed an exclusive contract with Konnect Entertainment. The agency confirmed this and said "we will spare no effort to support him so that he can showcase his full potential as a producer and artist". Following her departure from Source Music and the disbandment of South Korean girl group GFriend, former member Yuju signed an exclusive contract with Konnect Entertainment in September 2021.

In June 2022, Cafe de Konnect launched a beverage and dessert menu to commemorate the collaboration line between Kang and SpongeBob SquarePants. In the same year, the agency won the APAN K-pop Label Award for "leading the Korean wave" as it promotes the development of K-pop and is active in various fields. Kang, Chancellor, and Yuju each held a special performance at the 2022 APAN Star Awards to commemorate this award as artists of the agency. Following their placement as runner-up on Mnet's Street Man Fighter and their long-standing relationship with the agency as Kang's dance team, dance crew We Dem Boyz (WDBZ) officially signed an exclusive contract with Konnect Entertainment in November 2022. In the same month, they were featured on Kang's lead single "Nirvana" from his repackaged album The Story: Retold.

=== 2023–2024: Shareholder dispute, artists' departures, and business closure ===
On May 20, 2024, news broke that Kang Daniel had filed a criminal complaint to the Seoul Metropolitan Police Agency against A, pseudonym for the majority shareholder of Konnect Entertainment who held approximately 70% of its shares. The charges included forgery of private documents, embezzlement, breach of trust, infringement on information and communications network, and computer fraud. The major shareholder reportedly used Kang's name and company seal without approval to sign an advance distribution contract worth over ₩10 billion (USD$7.4 million) in December 2022. Kang only discovered the contract in January 2023 and made efforts for over a year to minimize damages. Additionally, A was accused of embezzling ₩2 billion ($1.5 million) from the company's accounts, using corporate credit cards unethically, and withdrawing ₩1.7 billion ($1.3 million) from Kang's personal account without his consent.

Meanwhile, We Dem Boyz, Yuju, and Chancellor left Konnect after not renewing their contracts. We Dem Boyz’s contract ended in November 2023, while Yuju's expired mid-April 2024. Kang did not renew his artist contract when it ended in early June and resigned as CEO. Furthermore, all Konnect employees left the company and the office building was vacated.

On June 9, Kang Daniel released a statement announcing that KONNECT Entertainment had closed down after five years.

== Partnerships ==
In July 2019, Sony Music Korea confirmed that it would take charge as both the investor and distributor of Kang's solo debut extended play (EP), Color on Me. Since then, the company has continued distributing Kang's subsequent works including his three-part color series: Cyan, Magenta, and Yellow. In June 2022, he started Japanese activities in partnership with Warner Music Japan.

In April 2021, South Korean game development company Dalcomsoft revealed its next rhythm game app featuring music from Kang Daniel. Developed by Dalcomsoft Inc. and in collaboration with Konnect Entertainment, the app was released on April 29, 2021 for iOS on the Apple App Store and for Android on the Google Play Store. Superstar Kang Daniel is the first version of the app series exclusively made for a solo artist. Two months later, it was announced that CL had signed a domestic management contract with Konnect Entertainment. The agency confirmed that it would be responsible for CL's domestic activities and said "we will actively support CL so that she can carry out her music activities as a top-tier musician". The partnership agreement between Konnect Entertainment and CL's own label Very Cherry was effective for two years.

In September 2022, South Korean production company Snowballs revealed its next puzzle game app featuring Kang Daniel as the main character. Developed by Snowballs Inc. and in collaboration with Konnect Entertainment, Starway Kang Daniel was released on September 29, 2022 for iOS on the Apple App Store and for Android on the Google Play Store.

Aside from business partnerships, Konnect shared in April 2020 it partnered with LIWU Law Group's Clean Internet Center to preemptively take legal action against malicious comments and illegal postings that unfairly violate one's personal rights.

== Philanthropy ==
In December 2019, it was revealed that Konnect Entertainment donated 31,000 briquettes to 31 briquette banks nationwide to thank fans for helping those in need on Kang's birthday. In December 2020, Kang and all of his agency staff participated in the Holt Children's Services (HCS) campaign "Please Protect Me" by handcrafting and delivering 100 book covers to the humanitarian organization. Proceeds from the book cover kits bought by Konnect would be used to provide mental and medical care, housing, living, and educational support to children in need.

== Former artists ==
- Kang Daniel (2019–2024)
- CL (2021–2023) (co-managed with Very Cherry)
- We Dem Boyz (WDBZ) (2022–2023)
- Yuju (2021–2024)
- Chancellor (2021–2024)

== Discography ==
=== 2019 and 2020s ===
Released	Title	Artist	Type	Format	Language
2019
July 25	Color on Me	Kang Daniel	Extended play	CD, download, streaming	Korean
November 25	"Touchin'"	Kang Daniel	Single	Download, streaming	Korean
2020
March 24	Cyan	Kang Daniel	Extended play	CD, download, streaming	Korean
July 27	"Waves"	Kang Daniel (feat. Simon Dominic, Jamie)	Single	Download, streaming	Korean
August 3	Magenta	Kang Daniel	Extended play	CD, download, streaming	Korean
2021
February 16	"Paranoia"	Kang Daniel	Single	Download, streaming	Korean
April 13	Yellow	Kang Daniel	Extended play	CD, download, streaming	Korean
October 13	Chancellor	Chancellor	Studio album	CD, download, streaming	Korean
2022
January 18	Rec.	Yuju	Extended play	CD, download, streaming	Korean
May 24	The Story	Kang Daniel	Studio album	CD, download, streaming	Korean
July 28	"Evening"	Yuju (feat. Big Naughty)	Single	Download, streaming	Korean
October 5	Joy Ride	Kang Daniel	Extended play	CD, download, streaming	Japanese
November 14	"Slowly"	Chancellor	Single	Download, streaming	Korean
November 24	The Story: Retold	Kang Daniel	Reissue	CD, download, streaming	Korean
2023
March 7	O	Yuju	Extended play	CD, download, streaming	Korean
June 7	"Wasteland"	Kang Daniel	Single	Download, streaming	English
June 19	Realiez	Kang Daniel	Extended play	CD, download, streaming	Korean, English
September 20	"Dalala"	Yuju	Single	Download, streaming	Korean
November 29	Re8el	Kang Daniel	Extended play	CD, download, streaming	Japanese

== Accolade ==
Name of the award ceremony, year presented, category, nominee of the award, and the result of the nomination
Award	Year	Category	Nominee	Result	Ref.
APAN Star Awards	2022	K-pop Label Award	Konnect Entertainment – Kang Daniel (Founder and CEO)	Won	
