= Be Mbitious =

2022 South Korean dance reality competition program

- Promotional poster
- Hangul: 비엠비셔스
- RR: Bi embisyeoseu
- MR: Pi embisyŏsŭ
- Genre: Reality competition
- Presented by: Rain
- Opening theme: "SMF" by Changmo (Prod. Czaer)
- Country of origin: South Korea
- Original language: Korean
- No. of episodes: 3

Production
- Production companies: CJ ENM; LUYWORKS Media

Original release
- Network: Mnet
- Release: May 24 – May 31, 2022

Related
- Street Woman Fighter; Street Man Fighter

Be Mbitious (Korean: 비앰비셔스) is a 2022 South Korean dance reality competition program created by Mnet. It aired from May 24 to 31, 2022. It is the first part of the male counterpart of Street Woman Fighter, and prequel to Street Man Fighter. The purpose of the show is to create a dance crew with male solo dancers to compete on Street Man Fighter. The new crew will be named Mbitious.

== Cast ==
The program is presented by Rain. The dance judges are:

- Leejung (YGX)
- Gabee (LACHICA)
- Hyojin Choi (WANT)
- Noze (WAYB)
- Rihey (CocaNButter)
- Monika, Lip J (Prowdmon)
- Honey J (HolyBang)
- Aiki (HOOK)
- Kiel Tutin

=== Special Guests ===
==== Audition Evaluators (Episode 1) ====
- Bae Yoon-jung
- Poppin' Hyun Joon
- Lip J
- Ha Hwi-dong
- Kwak Gwi-hoon
- Ha Woo-shin

==== Dance Instructors (Episode 1) ====
- HolyBang (Jane, Hertz)
- LACHICA (Peanut, H-1, Simeez)

== Contestants ==
A total of 458 participants applied to the program. Only 40 were selected by special evaluators to compete in the program. Notable applicants who did not make the cut are Kim Samuel, B.A.P's Jong-up and Zelo, DKB's Hee-chan, and WetBoy. (Note: All audition videos were posted on YouTube on THE CHOOM channel)

List of Be Mbitious contestants
Name	Age (Note: Korean age)	Main Dance Genre	Secondary Dance Genre	Notes
5000 (오천)	33	Hip Hop	Popping	Member of Bitgoeul dancers and is known as one of the top street dancers of South Korea. Former member of XEBEC.
Ain (아인)	19	Hip Hop, Choreography	Popping, Girl's Hip Hop	
Austin (오스틴)	30			Former choreographer at 1MILLION Dance Studio
Bae Seung-yoon (배승윤)	25	Girl's Hip Hop	Hip Hop, Waacking	Honey J's student. Also known as "Holy Bae".
Baek Jin (백진)	28	Breakdancing, Choreography	Freestyle	Former Produce X 101 contestant. Former JxR member. Former member of Expression Crew.
Biggle (비글)	28	Hip Hop Choreography	Locking, Popping	
BM (비엠)	31	Relaxed Swag	Krumping, Hip Hop, House	Kard member
BROTHER BIN (브라더빈)	23	Locking	House, Hip Hop, Waacking, Breakdancing	
Byun Yong-seok (변용석)	33	Choreography	House, Hip Hop	
Cha Hyun-seung (차현승)	33	None	All genres	Backup dancer for Sunmi; Contestant on Single's Inferno.
Ciz (씨즈)	32	Choreography	Hip Hop, Popping	
Clown Maker (클라운메이커)	29	Breakdancing, Choreography	Locking, Hip Hop, Contemporary, Waacking + more	Performed with YGX in Men of Woman Mission.
Crazy Kyo (크레이지쿄)	41	choreography	popping	Known as one of the top popping dancers of South Korea.
DAN (단)	24	Choreography	Breakdancing, Contemporary	
Harry June (해리준)	19	Hip Hop Choreography	Hip Hop Tutting	DKB member.
JIN (진)	25	Popping	Locking, House, Hip Hop, Jookin	
Jinwoo (진우)	27			Former choreographer at 1Million Dance Academy.
Juki (주키)	22	Afro	Hip Hop, Locking, House	
Jung Koo-sung (정구성)	27	Choreography	Hip Hop	Former choreographer at 1MILLION Dance Studio.
Kasper (캐스퍼)	30	Choreography	Breakdancing, Krumping	Choreographer for SM Entertainment
Kim Jung-woo (김정우)	19	Choreography, Hip Hop	Krumping	
Kim Pyoung-ya (김병야)	28	Hip Hop	Krumping, Popping, Locking, Choreography, House, Breakdancing	Former member of Woo Fam.
Kino (키노)	25	Choreography	Hip Hop, Popping, Locking, House	Pentagon member.
Kuma Shin (쿠마신)	27	Choreography	Hip Hop, Popping	
Kuro (쿠로)	22	Choreography	Hip Hop	Member of L.A.M.F
Lee Ho-won (이호원)	32	Hip Hop	Choreography	Former Infinite member.
LIL'C (릴씨)	25	Popping	Hip Hop, House, Locking	Member of FUNKINTHEHEART and Freaky Nerds.
Logan (로건)	28	Choreography	House, Afro, Dancehall, Hip Hop	
Midnightblue (미드나잇블루)	28	Breakdancing	Hip Hop, Broadcast Choreography	
OHBODY (오바디)	44	Hip Hop	House	First generation hip hop dancer. Dance teacher of Hyojin Choi, Lee Ho-won, Wootae, and Trandee Rock.
Roh Tae-hyun (노태현)	30	Krumping, Choreography	All genres except Breakdancing	Former Produce 101 Season 2 contestant. Former JBJ & Hotshot m ember
Tarzan (타잔)	26	Hip Hop, Breakdancing	Choreography	Choreographer at 1MILLION Dance Studio.
Trandee Rock (트렌디락)	25			Former member of Novelty Wildy Motion. Former student of OHBODY.
Trexman (티렉스맨)	30	Popping	None	
Tutat (투탓)	32	Tutting, Popping	None	World-renowned for his tutting skills.
U (유)	24	Hip Hop	House, Urban	ONF member. Former Mix Nine contestant.
UKUN (유쿤)	25	Hip Hop	Choreography, Locking, Popping, Soul, House, Breakdancing	Choreographer at 1MILLION Dance Studio.
Wootae (우태)	32	Choreography	Breakdancing, Hip Hop, House, Krumping	Dance professor at Kookmin University.
XHIN (씬)	26	Waacking	Jazz, Choreography	
Yamakasi (야마카시)	26	Hip Hop	New School Hip Hop, Breakdancing, Choreography, Popping, Urban, Locking, Electro	Dancer from Mongolia

== Missions ==
=== Mission 1: Hey Mama Choreography Copy Mission ===
Contestants must learn and memorize two choreographies of "Hey Mama" by David Guetta created by Street Woman Fighter crews HolyBang and LACHICA. Contestants will then dance these choreographies back to back starting with HolyBang's choreography in groups of three to be evaluated by HolyBang and LACHICA. Each crew will then give each contestant either a "Respect" ranking or "Retry" ranking. A contestant must receive a "Respect" ranking from both crews to be able to pass the mission and be labeled a "RESPECT" dancer. "RESPECT" dancers may choose any non-"RESPECT" dancer as their opponent for the next round and label them as "NO RESPECT" dancers. If a contestant receives at least one "Retry" ranking, they must go back to the main area and try again. Contestants can only attempt to be evaluated twice. If a contestant receives a "Retry" Ranking on their second attempt, they are automatically labelled a "NO RESPECT" dancer. If a contestant goes to be evaluated and they have been chosen as a "NO RESPECT" dancer, they cannot be evaluated and must leave the evaluation room. This mission ends when 20 contestants pass as "RESPECT" dancers or when the time limit of 3 hours is over.

Final RESPECT/NO RESPECT List
RESPECT
Trandee Rock	Wootae	BROTHER BIN	Clown Maker	Bae Seung-yoon
Kasper	Cha Hyun-seung	Jinwoo	Kino	JIN
LIL'C	Tarzan	Jung Koo-sung	UKUN	Yamakasi
Lee Ho-won	Harry June	Tutat	U	Ciz
NO RESPECT
OHBODY	Kuro	Kim Jung-woo	XHIN	Ain
BM	Midnightblue	Byun Yong-seok	DAN	Roh Tae-hyun
Logan	Trexman	Austin	Kuma Shin	Crazy Kyo
Juki	Baek Jin	Biggle	Kim Pyoung-ya	5000

=== Mission 2: 1 on 1 Battle Evaluation ===
Each "RESPECT" dancer calls out their chosen "NO RESPECT" dancer. They will compete in a one on one battle with the winner advancing to the next round. The one on one battle consists of two parts, a choreography section and a freestyle section. For the choreography section, the "RESPECT" dancer will create a choreography to "SMF" by Changmo (Prod. Czaer) and then teach their opposing "NO RESPECT" dancer. Both dancers will then compete after some time of practice and will be evaluated by the dance judges. The dance judges will vote on who will advance to the next round, with the advancing contestants receiving an "IN". Each round will either have one or both contestants receiving an "OUT". A total of 20 contestants will be eliminated.

Color key:

- IN
- OUT

1 on 1 Battle Evaluations
RESPECT	vs.	NO RESPECT
Clown Maker	vs.	XHIN
U	vs.	Kim Pyoung-ya
Cha Hyun-seung	vs.	Midnightblue
Wootae	vs.	Kuro
BROTHER BIN (Note: Received a pass due to dance judges having to choose 3 additional contestants to pass since only 17 contestants receiving "IN" in the initial evaluation)	vs.	Kim Jung-woo
Kino	vs.	DAN
Jinwoo	vs.	Byun Yong-seok
Bae Seung-yoon	vs.	Ain
Tarzan	vs.	Trexman
Trandee Rock (Note: Initially, only 20 contestants are allowed to the next round but due to the consensus of the dance judges, an exception was made and the number of contestants advancing increased to 21)	vs.	OHBODY
UKUN	vs.	Kuma Shin
Harry June	vs.	Baek Jin
Lee Ho-won	vs.	Juki
Yamakasi	vs.	Crazy Kyo
Ciz	vs.	5000
LIL'C	vs.	Logan
Tutat	vs.	Biggle
JIN	vs.	Roh Tae-hyun
Jung Koo-sung	vs. (Note: Unaired battle. Battle was uploaded on YouTube to THE CHOOM channel.)	Austin
Kasper	vs.	BM

== Final results ==
The final crew, Mbitious, will consist of 8 members. The members will be chosen through evaluation by a crew selection committee combined with an online popular vote.

- The Crew Selection Committee can award up to 600 points.
- The voting period is from June 1, 2022, after the airing of the third episode to June 4, 2022, at 23:59 KST. (Note: Videos were posted on YouTube on THE CHOOM channel on June 1. Restricted to only Korea) Scores are calculated as Views + Likes X 100. Contestants are ranked from this score and awarded points starting at 400 points for the highest score.

Final scores are calculated as the sum of the Crew Selection Committee's Score + Global Popular Vote Score

The final results were announced on the one-episode television special Be the SMF, presented by Kang Daniel.

Final rankings
Name	Public Score	Committee Score	Total	Ranking	
Roh Tae-hyun (노태현)	**400**	482.7	882.7	1	PASS
5000 (오천)	**201.6**	**578**	779.6	2	PASS
Wootae (우태)	**164.9**	**596.3**	761.2	3	PASS
Tarzan (타잔)	136.2	**599.9**	736.1	4	PASS
Lee Ho-won (이호원)	**243.2**	492	735.2	5	PASS
Kim Pyoung-ya (김병야)	**152.7**	**574.4**	727.1	6	PASS
Kim Jung-woo (김정우)	**214.6**	494.9	709.5	7	PASS
Jinwoo (진우)	89.2	**587.2**	676.4	8	PASS
Trandee Rock (트렌디락)	140.4	**530.6**	671	9	
Kino (키노)	**145.7**	**524.5**	670.2	10	
BROTHER BIN (브라더빈)	103.7	**553.6**	657.3	11	
DAN (단)	96.5	524.3	620.8	12	
Bae Seung-yoon (배승윤)	**171.4**	442.6	614	13	
XHIN (씬)	118.7	491.1	609.8	14	
Biggle (비글)	88.1	501.3	589.4	15	
Yamakasi (야마카시)	95.6	491.9	587.5	16	
LIL'C (릴씨)	30.7	511.8	542.5	17	
Harry June (해리준)	43.1	498	541.1	18	
OHBODY (오바디)	61.1	466.3	527.4	19	
UKUN (유쿤)	40.3	457.1	497.4	20	
Cha Hyun-seung (차현승)	70.7	419.5	490.2	21	

Numbers in bold for each score category denotes the top 8 highest scores.

== Ratings ==
Average TV viewership ratings (nationwide)
Ep.	Original broadcast date	Average audience share (Nielsen Korea)
1	May 24, 2022	0.481% (69th)
2	May 25, 2022	0.469% (74th)
3	May 31, 2022	0.768% (35th)
Average		0.573%
In the table above, the blue numbers represent the lowest ratings and the red numbers represent the highest ratings.; This show aired on a cable channel/pay TV which normally has a relatively smaller audience compared to free-to-air TV/public broadcasters (KBS, SBS, MBC and EBS).

== Sequel ==
=== Be the SMF ===
Be the SMF is a one-episode television special that preceded Street Man Fighter and aired on July 5, 2022. It announced the final eight members who will jointly make up the 'Mbitious' crew on SMF. It also revealed the 8 crews participating in Street Man Fighter.

=== Street Man Fighter ===
In the final of Street Dance Girls Fighter on January 4, 2022, Mnet Drops 1st Teaser and confirmed "Street Man Fighter" where male dance crews fight for the position of Korea's best male dance crew to represent K-Dance to be released in August 2022.
