= Street Man Fighter =

2022 South Korean reality dance series

- Season 2
- Promotional poster
- Native name
- Hangul: 스트릿 맨 파이터
- RR: Seuteurit maen paiteo
- MR: Sŭt'ŭrit maen p'ait'ŏ
- Hosted by: Kang Daniel
- Judges: BoA; Eunhyuk; Wooyoung
- No. of teams: 8
- Winner: JustJerk (Note: Members: Young-J, J-Ho, S.One, Yejun, Hulk, Howl, Minseo)
- No. of episodes: 10

Release
- Original network: Mnet
- Original release: August 23 – November 8, 2022

Season chronology
- ← Previous; Street Woman Fighter Next → Street Woman Fighter 2

Street Man Fighter (Korean: 스트릿 맨 파이터), often abbreviated SMF, is the second season of the South Korean dance competition franchise Street Woman Fighter. It aired on Mnet from August 23 to November 8, 2022, every Tuesday at 22:20 (KST) time slot for 10 episodes. It revolved around eight male dance crews fighting for the position of Korea's best male dance crew to represent street dance in the country (loosely marketed under the term "K-dance").

On November 8, 2022, on their last episode, JustJerk came in first place with 92,321 votes. The runner-up was We Dem Boyz, with 44,274 votes, followed by Mbitious (32,302 votes) and Bank Two Brother (25,034 votes). The winning crew (Just Jerk) received ₩50 million, electric sedans from BMW, a sponsorship deal with KB Kookmin Bank, and the Street Man Fighter Trophy.

== Cast ==
The program is presented by Kang Daniel.

The dance judges of this season are:

- BoA
- Eunhyuk (Super Junior)
- Wooyoung (2PM)

=== Special Guests ===
==== "Class" mission (episode 2) ====
- Zico
- Gray
- Giriboy
- GroovyRoom
- Czaer

==== "Mega Crew" mission (episode 6–7) ====
- Sehun (Exo)
- Harry June (DKB)
- Kinjaz (video appearance)
- Mike Song (Kinjaz) (special judge)

==== "Rain Choreography" mission (episode 7) ====
- Rain
- Kim Kyu-sang

==== Finale (episode 10) ====
- Lee Sun-bin
- Mike Song (Kinjaz) (special judge)
- Kwon Eun-bi
- Choi Ye-na
- Yuju
- Yoo Taeyang (SF9)
- Los Bravú (Dea Gómez & Diego Omil)
- Mathías Sánchez
- Fatíma De Juan
- Katherine Bernhardt

==== Street Man Fighter: Gala Talkshow (special episodes) ====
- Haha
- Jang Do-yeon
- Kang Seung-yoon (Winner)

== Contestants ==
Color key:

- Leader
- Sub-Leader

List of Street Man Fighter contestants
Crew	Name	Birthday	Notes
BankTwoBrothers (Note: Originally Competed under the name "BIIB (B2B)", However they changed the crew name and its pronunciation in the middle of the competition due to a controversy over a boyband with the same name)	J Roc (제이락)	October 8, 1988 (age 37)	Former member of Cream082 and CrackKidz; Known as the "Original Representative of Hip-Hop"; One of the innovators of the underground street dance scene in South Korea.
BankTwoBrothers	Busybe (비치비)	October 28, 1992 (age 33)	Former member of Cream082.
BankTwoBrothers	Hyu (휴) (Note: Hyu made his first appearance during the Class Mission round. Since then, he became a regular member of the show.)	October 5, 1990 (age 35)	Former member of 2 O'CLOCK.
BankTwoBrothers	Feeldog (필독)	February 26, 1992 (age 34)	Former Big Star and UNB member Former The Unit: Idol Rebooting Project Contestant. Former member of PAYDAY and 2 O'CLOCK.
BankTwoBrothers	Deegun (디건)	February 6, 1993 (age 33)	Member of Olly Oxen Free (OOF) crew.
BankTwoBrothers	Gof (고프)	March 11, 1995 (age 31)	Former member of TreyBeatz and Repiz.
BankTwoBrothers	Gi.seok (기석)	December 1, 1995 (age 30)	Former member of AtWill.
Eo-Ddae	TED (테드)	June 22, 1994 (age 32)	Back-up dancer for Hyuna, Dawn, Psy, Yubin, Hwasa, Solar, CLC, BoA, and Chungha.
Eo-Ddae	Kinky (킹키)	May 21, 1993 (age 33)	Professional drag dancer Member of Coming Out crew Back-up dancer for Hyuna, Dawn, Psy, Yubin, Hwasa, Solar, CLC, BoA, and Chungha.
Eo-Ddae	Duck (덕)	July 31, 1995 (age 30)	Back-up dancer for Hyuna, Dawn, Psy, Yubin, Solar, CLC, BoA, and Chungha; Former member of Woo Fam and Reignover.
Eo-Ddae	Quanz (쾬즈)	June 5, 1995 (age 31)	Back-up dancer for Hyuna, Dawn, Psy, Yubin, Solar, CLC, BoA, Chungha, and Kwon Eun-bi. Member of Foreal.
Eo-Ddae	Black.Q (블랙큐)	November 10, 1995 (age 30)	ADOR performance director and choreographer for NewJeans; Back-up dancer for Taemin, Hyuna, Dawn, Psy, Yubin, Solar, CLC, BoA, and Chungha.
Eo-Ddae	E Jo (이조)	August 6, 1996 (age 29)	Back-up dancer for Taemin, Hyuna, Dawn, Psy, Yubin, Solar, CLC, BoA, and Chungha; Former member of Woo Fam and Reignover.
Mbitious (Note: Formed on Be Mbitious)	5000 (오천)	January 24, 1991 (age 35)	Member of Bitgoeul Dancers and former member of XEBEC; Known as the "Bad Boy of the Hip-Hop Dance Scene"; Known for his musicality and his frequent wins, with over 200 wins in individual battles.
Mbitious	Wootae (우태)	April 15, 1991 (age 35)	Choreographer for Ravi, Highlight, Baekhyun, Kai, Super Junior, Jay Park, and BoA.
Mbitious	Lee Ho-won (이호원)	March 28, 1991 (age 35)	Former Infinite member. Former member of 2 O'CLOCK.
Mbitious	Roh Tae-hyun (노태현)	October 15, 1993 (age 32)	Former Hotshot and JBJ member Former Produce 101 Season 2 contestant Former member of Woo Fam under the name, "Kid Monster"
Mbitious	Kim Pyoung-ya (김평야)	July 2, 1995 (age 31)	Former member of Woo Fam, Leviathan, Reignover, and $MVK.
Mbitious	Jinwoo (진우)	November 5, 1996 (age 29)	Aitty Too member. Choreographer for NCT and Stray Kids.
Mbitious	Tarzan (타잔)	September 30, 1997 (age 28)	Aitty Too member.
Mbitious	Kim Jung-woo (김정우) (Note: Kim Jung-woo decided to drop out of the program starting with the Global K-Dance Mission)	November 17, 2004 (age 21)	
YGX	Deukie (드기)	November 20, 1989 (age 36)	Twin brother of Dony, member of YGX's HiTech
YGX	Dony (도니)	November 20, 1989 (age 36)	Twin brother of Deukie, member of YGX's HiTech
YGX	Junho (준호)	December 2, 1991 (age 34)	Member of YGX's NWX
YGX	Junsun (준선)	March 12, 1994 (age 32)	Brother of Oh My Girl's YooA
YGX	Hyunse (현세)	December 14, 1995 (age 30)	Member of LoyalChumps
YGX	Dow (도우)	October 9, 1996 (age 29)	Member of YGX's HiTech
YGX	Mood Dok (무드독)	September 12, 1998 (age 27)	Member of YGX's NWX
1Million	Back Koo-young (백구영)	December 19, 1985 (age 40)	SM Entertainment's exclusive performance director Tapaha Dance Studio signboard instructor Girls Planet 999 dance master Choreographer for Exo, The Boyz, Kep1er, JO1, BoA, Taemin, and Just B
1Million	Choi Young-jun (최영준)	December 17, 1984 (age 41)	Produce 48 and Produce X 101 dance trainer Choreographer for numerous artist, including Wanna One, Seventeen, Stray Kids, Twice, Iz*One, Monsta X, Shinhwa, YooA, WJSN, and Fromis 9
1Million	Nino (니노)	January 5, 1995 (age 31)	
1Million	Alexx (알렉스)	May 28, 1998 (age 28)	Also a member of GrandBoys dance crew
1Million	Yechan (예찬)	January 20, 1999 (age 27)	Also a member of GrandBoys dance crew
1Million	Yumeki (유메키)	November 12, 1999 (age 26)	Japanese member Choreographer for The Boyz, Itzy, Shinee, Purple Kiss, Oneus, and ONF; Back-up dancer for Exo and Shinee
1Million	Root (루트)	December 29, 2003 (age 22)	Choreographer for Billlie, Purple Kiss, and Oneus. Backup dancer for Solar, Mamamoo, Baekhyun, Key, and Seventeen.
WeDemBoyz	Vata (바타)	December 12, 1994 (age 31)	Choreographer and back-up dancer for Kang Daniel; Choreographer for numerous artists, including SuperM, CL, Nmixx, Cravity, Omega X, Victon, Kard, Shinee, Seventeen
WeDemBoyz	Ingyoo (인규)	June 7, 1998 (age 28)	Choreographer and back-up dancer for Kang Daniel; Choreographer for numerous artists, including SuperM, CL, Cravity, Victon, Shinee, Seventeen
WeDemBoyz	Kyungnam (경남)	June 16, 1994 (age 32)	Back-up dancer for Kang Daniel
WeDemBoyz	Insun (인선)	October 31, 1994 (age 31)	Back-up dancer for Kang Daniel
WeDemBoyz	Haesung (해성)	May 29, 1995 (age 31)	Back-up dancer for Kang Daniel, Sunmi, NCT
WeDemBoyz	Youngbin (영빈)	September 23, 1996 (age 29)	Back-up dancer for Kang Daniel
WeDemBoyz	Dophan (도프한)	March 10, 1997 (age 29)	Back-up dancer for Kang Daniel
WeDemBoyz	Kamel (카멜)	January 12, 1998 (age 28)	Back-up dancer for Kang Daniel and Chungha. Former member of ASSA.
JustJerk (Note: Before the competition, the crew have competed in America's Got Talent (season 12) and Dancing High, the crew even performed on Hit the Stage and the 2018 Winter Olympics opening ceremony at Pyeongchang)	Young-J (영제이)	February 22, 1992 (age 34)	Founder of JustJerk; Choreographer at Just Jerk Academy. Former member of PAYDAY.
JustJerk	J-Ho (제이호)	February 9, 1992 (age 34)	Founding member of JustJerk. Choreographer at Just Jerk Academy. Former member of PAYDAY.
JustJerk	S.One (에스원)	March 21, 1989 (age 37)	Choreographer at Just Jerk Academy
JustJerk	Yejun (예준)	December 24, 1997 (age 28)	Choreographer at Just Jerk Academy
JustJerk	Hulk (헐크)	November 25, 1998 (age 27)	Back-up dancer for Chungha and Jay Park; Choreographer at Just Jerk Academy
JustJerk	Howl (하울)	November 11, 1999 (age 26)	Choreographer at Just Jerk Academy
JustJerk	Minseo (민서)	June 19, 2002 (age 24)	Choreographer at Just Jerk Academy
Prime Kingz	Trix (트릭스)	March 25, 1990 (age 36)	First and only Asian to win a Krump World Championship; Also known as Eyez X Former member of Woo Fam; Former contestant in season 2 of Dancing 9
Prime Kingz	Knucks (넉스)	March 15, 1992 (age 34)	Also known as Monster Mijo; Former member of Woo Fam; Boyfriend of Coca N'Butter leader Rihey in which they performed together in Street Woman Fighter's "Man of Woman" round
Prime Kingz	2Face (투페이스)	December 11, 1985 (age 40)	Professional body builder Former member of Woo Fam
Prime Kingz	Door (도어)	August 13, 1994 (age 31)	Member of Kings Table and Rumble Fam
Prime Kingz	Counter (카운터)	November 9, 1994 (age 31)	Also Known as Lil Rumbler; Member of Kings Table and Rumbler Fam
Prime Kingz	Kyoyung Jr. (교영주니어)	March 30, 1995 (age 31)	

== Missions ==
=== Mission 1: "Battle of the Underdog" ===
Each dancer beforehand pointed out a dancer from an opposing team that they can beat in a one-on-one dance battle. The chosen dancer is given a "No Respect" Sticker for each time they are chosen.

Rules for the dance battles
- The named dancer points out a dancer they consider to be the weakest, and engages in a one-on-one dance battle for 40 seconds each.
- The named dancer goes first while the pointed out dancer goes second.
- At the end of the battle, the Fight Judges will determine the winner.
- Fight Judges can request a rematch when no winner can be decided. A rematch will take place if two or more judges cannot decide a winner or in the case of a 1:1 tie and the third judge cannot choose a winner. In the rematch, both dancers dance at the same time for 40 seconds.
- The winning dancer gives a NO RESPECT sticker of their respective crew color to the losing team, which is stuck on their crew fist.
- The team with the most losses are labeled as the NO RESPECT Crew.

Round two consists of two-on-two battles. Round three consists of five-on-five crew battles. The rules for these rounds are the same as the one-on-one dance battles except if a rematch is called, it will only be a one-on-one battles with one member from each duo or crew.

"No Respect" stickers
Crew	Name	No. of stickers	Total
**YGX**	Deukie (드기)	8	15 stickers
**YGX**	Dony(도니)	4	15 stickers
**YGX**	Junho (준호)	4	15 stickers
**YGX**	Dow (도우)	1	15 stickers
**BankTwoBrothers**	None	0	0 sticker
**1Million**	Back Koo-young (백구영)	1	11 stickers
**1Million**	Choi Young-jun (최영준)	1	11 stickers
**1Million**	Alex (알렉스)	5	11 stickers
**1Million**	Nino (니노)	3	11 stickers
**1Million**	Yechan (예찬)	1	11 stickers
**Eo-Ddae**	Ted (테드)	1	7 stickers
**Eo-Ddae**	Black.Q (블랙큐)	1	7 stickers
**Eo-Ddae**	Quanz (쾬즈)	2	7 stickers
**Eo-Ddae**	E Jo (이조)	3	7 stickers
**MBitious**	5000 (오천)	3	12 stickers
**MBitious**	Wootae (우태)	3	12 stickers
**MBitious**	Lee Ho-won (제트썬)	2	12 stickers
**MBitious**	Roh Tae-hyun (노태현)	1	12 stickers
**MBitious**	Kim Pyeong-ya (김평야)	1	12 stickers
**MBitious**	Tarzan (타잔)	1	12 stickers
**MBitious**	Kim Jung-woo (김정우)	1	12 stickers
**Prime Kingz**	Trix (트릭스)	2	5 stickers
**Prime Kingz**	Knucks (넉스)	2	5 stickers
**Prime Kingz**	Kyoyoung Jr. (교영주니어)	1	5 stickers
**WeDemBoyz**	Vata (바타)	3	9 stickers
**WeDemBoyz**	Ingyoo (인규)	1	9 stickers
**WeDemBoyz**	Kyungnam (경남)	1	9 stickers
**WeDemBoyz**	Haesung (해성)	3	9 stickers
**WeDemBoyz**	Kamel (가멭)	1	9 stickers
**Just Jerk**	Young-J (영제이)	1	4 stickers
**Just Jerk**	J-Ho (제이호)	1	4 stickers
**Just Jerk**	S.One (에스원)	1	4 stickers
**Just Jerk**	Yejun (예준)	1	4 stickers
Total			**63 stickers**

Underdog battles from ep. 1–2
Round	Team (Note: Team colours adjusted for readability)	Contestant	Votes
1	MBitious	Roh Tae-hyun	1
1	Prime Kingz	Trix	2
2	YGX	Deukie	1
2	Prime Kingz	Knucks	2
3	BankTwoBrothers	BusyBe	2
3	Just Jerk	S.One	1
4	Eo-Ddae	Kinky	3
4	1Million	Choi Young-jun	0
5	WeDemBoyz	Ingyoo	1
5	Just Jerk	J-Ho	2
6	Prime Kingz	Knucks & Door	0
6	Just Jerk	Hulk & Yejun	3
7	1Million	Yumeki & Root	2
7	Mbitious	5000 & Jinwoo	1
8	Just Jerk	Crew (except Young J)	1
8	We Dem Boyz	Crew (except Vata)	2
9	Eo-Ddae	Crew	2
9	1Million	Crew	1
10	YGX	Crew	0
10	Prime Kingz	Crew	3
11 (Note: YGX and Mbitious had the two lowest wins in the No Respect battle. Each team sent a member for battle to determine who is the "No Respect" crew in this round.)	YGX	Hyunse	2
11	Mbitious	5000	1
12	Eo-Ddae	Kinky & Black.Q	1
12	1Million	Alexx & Yechan	2
13	Mbitious	Crew	0
13	YGX	Crew	3
14	Mbitious	5000	0
14	Prime Kingz	Trix	2
15	We Dem Boyz	Vata	0
15	Just Jerk	Young J	3

Unaired battles
Round	Team	Contestant	Votes
1	Prime Kingz	Knucks	3
1	YGX	Dony	0
2	Prime Kingz	Kyoyoung Jr.	Unrevealed
2	MBitious	Kim Pyeong-ya	Unrevealed
3	BankTwoBrothers	Feeldog and Deegun	Unrevealed
3	We Dem Boyz	Ingyoo and Kamel	Unrevealed
4	MBitious	5000	3
4	1Million	Back Koo-young	0
5	MBitious	5000	Unrevealed
5	BankTwoBrothers	J-Roc	Unrevealed
6	Eo-Ddae	Quanz	Unrevealed
6	BankTwoBrothers	GOF	Unrevealed
7	Eo-Ddae	TED	Unrevealed
7	YGX	Deukie	Unrevealed
8	Eo-Ddae	Ted	3
8	1Million	Yechan	0
9	Mbitious	Lee Ho-won	3
9	1Million	Root	0

Ranking
Rank	Crew	Wins	Losses
1	Prime Kingz	9	1
2	JustJerk	7	4
3	WeDemBoyz	5	4
4	1Million	6	5
5	BankTwoBrothers	3	5
5	Eo-Ddae	3	5
7	YGX	3	8
8	Mbitious	5	9

=== Mission 2: "Class" ===
Each crew leader chooses seven members (Note: BankTwoBrothers, Eo-Ddae, and Prime Kingz only have six members so will only send one member to Middle Class 1. Dancers Hyu, HG, and Volley filled in as the second dancer for each crew respectively.) (Note: 7 is the max number of members that can be sent. As a result, Mbitious' Roh Tae-Hyun and WeDemBoyz's Dophan did not participate in this round.) including themselves to be split into five ranks. Each rank will work together to create a dance video. Each rank will only have one main dancer which will be chosen by the judges. The rest will be back-up dancers in the video. Each dancer in a rank will create a short choreography which will be voted on by the members of their rank. The chosen choreography will be the one used to determine the main dancer.

Main dancer's benefits
- In charge of the center position, choreography, and directing the video for their rank.
- Receive 100 points for their crew.
- Can designate the two "worst dancers" in their rank to battle for the final "worst" dancer, who will get 50 points deducted from their crew.

The two worst dancers chosen by the main dancer will have a dance battle. At the end of the battle, all the dancers of the crews except for those of the battlers will vote for the worst dancer using a "Worst" token. The dancer with more "Worst" tokens is the worst dancer.

Color key:

- Main dancer(s)
- Worst dancer(s)
- **Bold** denotes chosen choreography

"Class" mission
Class	Team	Contestant	Song selection
Leader Class	BankTwoBrothers	J-Roc	"New Thing" by Zico featuring Homies
Leader Class	Eo-Ddae	Ted	"New Thing" by Zico featuring Homies
Leader Class	Mbitious	5000	"New Thing" by Zico featuring Homies
Leader Class	YGX	Deukie	"New Thing" by Zico featuring Homies
Leader Class	1Million	Back Koo-young	"New Thing" by Zico featuring Homies
Leader Class	WeDemBoyz	**Vata**	"New Thing" by Zico featuring Homies
Leader Class	JustJerk	Young J	"New Thing" by Zico featuring Homies
Leader Class	Prime Kingz	Trix	"New Thing" by Zico featuring Homies
Sub-leader Class	BankTwoBrothers	Busybe	"Law" by Bibi, Yoon Mi-rae
Sub-leader Class	Eo-Ddae	Kinky	"Law" by Bibi, Yoon Mi-rae
Sub-leader Class	Mbitious	**Wootae**	"Law" by Bibi, Yoon Mi-rae
Sub-leader Class	YGX	Dony	"Law" by Bibi, Yoon Mi-rae
Sub-leader Class	1Million	Choi Young-jun	"Law" by Bibi, Yoon Mi-rae
Sub-leader Class	WeDemBoyz	Ingyoo	"Law" by Bibi, Yoon Mi-rae
Sub-leader Class	JustJerk	J-Ho	"Law" by Bibi, Yoon Mi-rae
Sub-leader Class	Prime Kingz	Knucks	"Law" by Bibi, Yoon Mi-rae
Middle Class 1	BankTwoBrothers	Feeldog and Hyu (Note: Hyu became a regular member of the show during this round)	"Sweaty" by Gray featuring Loco, Coogie
Middle Class 1	Eo-Ddae	**Duck and HG**	"Sweaty" by Gray featuring Loco, Coogie
Middle Class 1	Mbitious	Lee Ho-won and Kim Pyeong-ya	"Sweaty" by Gray featuring Loco, Coogie
Middle Class 1	YGX	Junho and Hyunse	"Sweaty" by Gray featuring Loco, Coogie
Middle Class 1	1Million	Nino and Yumeki	"Sweaty" by Gray featuring Loco, Coogie
Middle Class 1	WeDemBoyz	Kyungnam and Youngbin	"Sweaty" by Gray featuring Loco, Coogie
Middle Class 1	JustJerk	S.One and Howl	"Sweaty" by Gray featuring Loco, Coogie
Middle Class 1	Prime Kingz	2face and Volly	"Sweaty" by Gray featuring Loco, Coogie
Middle Class 2	BankTwoBrothers	**Deegun and Giseok**	"100°C" by Giriboy featuring Yunhway
Middle Class 2	Eo-Ddae	Quanz and Black.Q	"100°C" by Giriboy featuring Yunhway
Middle Class 2	Mbitious	Jinwoo and Tarzan	"100°C" by Giriboy featuring Yunhway
Middle Class 2	YGX	Junsun and Dow	"100°C" by Giriboy featuring Yunhway
Middle Class 2	1Million	Alexx and Yechan	"100°C" by Giriboy featuring Yunhway
Middle Class 2	WeDemBoyz	Inseong and Haesung	"100°C" by Giriboy featuring Yunhway
Middle Class 2	JustJerk	Hulk and Yejun	"100°C" by Giriboy featuring Yunhway
Middle Class 2	Prime Kingz	Counter and Door (Note: Door did not participate in the judge's evaluation and music video after suffering from HiB meningitis during the choreography practice. Counter also suffered a hand injury during choreography practice but was able to perform alone in this round.)	"100°C" by Giriboy featuring Yunhway
Rookie Class	BankTwoBrothers	Gof	"Whistle" by Groovyroom featuring Sik-K, Mirani
Rookie Class	Eo-Ddae	Ejo	"Whistle" by Groovyroom featuring Sik-K, Mirani
Rookie Class	Mbitious	Kim Jung-woo	"Whistle" by Groovyroom featuring Sik-K, Mirani
Rookie Class	YGX	Mooddok	"Whistle" by Groovyroom featuring Sik-K, Mirani
Rookie Class	1Million	Root	"Whistle" by Groovyroom featuring Sik-K, Mirani
Rookie Class	WeDemBoyz	**Kamel**	"Whistle" by Groovyroom featuring Sik-K, Mirani
Rookie Class	JustJerk	Minseo	"Whistle" by Groovyroom featuring Sik-K, Mirani
Rookie Class	Prime Kingz	Kyoyung Jr.	"Whistle" by Groovyroom featuring Sik-K, Mirani

Color key:

- Winner

"Worst Dancer" battle
Round	Team	Contestant	Votes
Leader	Eo-Ddae	Ted	29
Leader	BankTwoBrothers	J-Roc	14
Sub-Leader	1Million	Choi Young-jun	34
Sub-Leader	YGX	Dony	7
Middle 1	MBITIOUS	Lee Howon, Kim Pyeongya	19
Middle 1	Prime Kingz	2face, Trix (Note: subbed in for Volly, originally not part of the crew)	22
Middle 2	1Million	Alexx, Yechan	32
Middle 2	JustJerk	Hulk, Yejun	9
Rookie	MBITIOUS	Kim Jung-woo	35
Rookie	WeDemBoyz	Kamel	3

Previous mission points
Crew	Points	Notes
WeDemBoyz	+100	MVP crew
BankTwoBrothers	+100	
YGX	+100	
Mbitious	+100, −50	
JustJerk	–	
1Million	+100, −100	
Eo-Ddae	−50	
Prime Kingz	−50	

Vata from WeDemBoyz was chosen as best director by the Fight Judges and paired up the crews for the next mission.

=== Mission 3: "Global K-Dance" ===
Two crews compete using the same song from boy groups that "impressed the world with their performances", BTS, BigBang, Exo, and Seventeen. Each crew must also complete the Choreography Copy Challenge. This round also included a bonus backup penalty part where the winner from the Choreography Copy Challenge could make the opposing crew into their backup dancers.

Choreography Copy Challenge
- There are two copy challenge sections in each song
- Of the two sections, each crew must take one section and create the choreography that the other team must "copy" and incorporate into their choreography
- If both crews want the same sections, they must discuss it among themselves
- Winning Crew chosen by the Fight Judges will also make a choreography where the opposing crew will be backup dancers.

"Choreography Copy Challenge" battle
Crew	Results	Song performed
WeDemBoyz	**Main crew**	"Growl" by Exo
1Million	Back-up crew	"Growl" by Exo
JustJerk	**Main crew**	"Idol" by BTS
Prime Kingz	Back-up crew	"Idol" by BTS
Mbitious	Back-up crew	"Adore u" by Seventeen
YGX	**Main crew**	"Adore u" by Seventeen
Eo-Ddae	**Main crew**	"Fantastic Baby" by BigBang
BankTwoBrothers	Back-up crew (Note: Due to Giseok's health issues and limited number of members available, BankTwoBrothers decided to forfeit during the Choreography Copy Challenge evaluation so automatically became the back-up crew) (Note: Deegun did not participate due to injury.)	"Fantastic Baby" by BigBang

The crew with the higher score for each battle wins and avoids elimination while the losing crew is nominated for elimination. Final scores are calculated as the sum of the Fight Judges' Score + Global Popular Vote Score + Main Dancer Score + Worst Dancer Score from the previous mission.

Scoring system
- Fight Judges' score: Total of 600 points split between both crews
- Global Popular Vote score: Voting period from July 8 to July 13, 2022, at 6:00 PM KST. (Note: Videos were posted on YouTube by Mnet on The Choom channel on July 8) Score calculated as Views + Likes X 100.

Color key:

- Winner

"Global K-Dance" mission
Crew	Song selection	Scores			
Crew	Song selection	Fight judges	Public vote	Previous mission	Total
**WeDemBoyz**	"Overdose" + "Ko Ko Bop" by Exo	320	600	+100	1020
**1Million**	"Overdose" + "Ko Ko Bop" by Exo	280	800	—	1080
**JustJerk** (Note: Yejun did not participate due to a shoulder injury)	"Blood Sweat & Tears" + "Fire" by BTS	215	700	—	915
**Prime Kingz**	"Blood Sweat & Tears" + "Fire" by BTS	385	400	−50	735
**Mbitious**	"Clap" + "Very Nice" by Seventeen	284	1000	+50	1334
**YGX**	"Clap" + "Very Nice" by Seventeen	316	900	+100	1316
**Eo-Ddae**	"Bang Bang Bang" by BigBang + "Good Boy" by GD X Taeyang	565	500	−50	1105
**BankTwoBrothers** (Note: Deegun did not participate due to injury. BankTwoBrothers member Reckless filled in for his spot and participated for this mission.)	"Bang Bang Bang" by BigBang + "Good Boy" by GD X Taeyang	35	300	+100	435

As the losing crews – YGX, WeDemBoyz, Prime Kingz, and BankTwoBrothers were chosen as candidates for elimination. BankTwoBrothers was automatically placed in the elimination battle as a result of receiving the lowest score, and YGX was excluded from selection as a result of receiving the highest score out of the 4 losing crews. Later Prime Kingz was announced as the crew to battle BankTwoBrothers in the first elimination round. WeDemBoyz was saved from elimination.

Rules of the elimination battle
- Best of 5:
  - Round 1 – Ace
  - Round 2 – 2v2
  - Round 3 – Leader
  - Round 4 – Crew
  - Round 5 – Rookie
- At the end of each round, the fight judges determine the winner
- The first crew to win three rounds is safe from elimination, while the losing crew is eliminated.

First elimination battle
Round	Contestant		Winning team
Round	BankTwoBrothers (Note: Deegun and Giseok did not participate due to injury.)	Prime Kingz (Note: 2Face did not participate in the battle due to injury, thus ending his appearance on the show.)	Winning team
1	Busybe	Door	Prime Kingz
2	Feeldog and Hyu	Door and Kyoyung Jr.	BankTwoBrothers
3 (Note: Tied at first battle; J-Roc won in second battle (2–1))	J-Roc	Trix	BankTwoBrothers
4	Crew (Note: Giseok and Deegun did not participate due to injury)	Crew	Prime Kingz
5	Gof	Kyoyung Jr.	BankTwoBrothers

=== Mission 4: "Mega Crew" ===
Crews will compete in a Mega Crew mission where each crew will create their own choreography and perform it with a minimum of 30 performers including themselves. Crews must personally recruit their mega crew performers. Each crew must choose a costume to determine their concept to perform (no duplication) and will have 3 directors. (Note: General director is the leader while the other two are from members.)

Final scores are calculated as the sum of the Fight Judges' Score + Global Popular Vote Score.

Scoring system
- Fight Judges' Score: Each judge awards up to 100 points to each three directors of each crew totaling up to 1200 points.
- Global Popular Vote Score: Voting period from September 20, 2022, at 12:30 AM KST to September 25, 2022, at 6:00 PM KST. (Note: Videos were posted on YouTube by Mnet on The Choom channel on September 20. Restricted to South Korea only.) Score calculated as Views + Likes X 100. Crews are ranked from this score and awarded points starting at 1200 points for the highest score.

"Mega Crew" mission (bold song was the original song that they used in the mission)
Crew	Crew size (Note: Including SMF participants)	Song selection	Scores		
Crew	Crew size	Song selection	Fight judges	Public vote	Total
**JustJerk**	49 (Note: Including b-boy crew Jinjo (Skim, Wing, Vero, Soma, Meadow, Kazino, Javelin, and Bekka))	"Loyal" by Odesza + **"Groove" by Jo Gwang-il**	1184	1200	2384
**Mbitious**	50 (Note: Including Monster Woo, b-boy crew Artistreet (Mario, Sknuf, Heady, Spax, Edward Elric, and Whale), and former Be Mbitious contestants (Cha Hyun-seung, Tutat, Kasper, Biggle, Yamakasi, DKB's Harry June, and Kuro))	"Lean Back" by Terror Squad featuring Fat Joe and Remy Ma + "Cereal" by IDK, J.I.D featuring Kenny Mason + **"Heyday" by Stray Kids (3Racha)** + "Tiimmy Turner" by Desiigner	1027	1150	2177
**1Million**	51 (Note: Including Exo's Sehun, and b-boy Pocket)	**"Nunu" by Loopy** + "Can't Hold Us" by Macklemore & Ryan Lewis featuring Ray Dalton	1027	1100	2127
**Eo-Ddae**	37 (Note: Including Bae Seung-yoon (former Be Mbitious contestant), Bboy Drop, Silva, KiKi, Rex, and Simbaa.)	"I Get Crazy" by Nicki Minaj + **"Blow Out" by Zior Park, Mommy Son** + "Dip" by Stefflon Don, Ms Banks + "Rave de Favela" by Major Lazer, MC Lan, Anitta featuring Beam	1029	1000	2029
**BankTwoBrothers** (Note: Deegun did not participate and eventually dropped out for the remainder of the show due to personal reasons.)	38 (Note: Including Ohbody, Stagger, Groovechan, Rivers Crew (Physicx, Jotee, Shinobi & Gawblin))	"Insane in the Brain" by Cypress Hill + "Jump" by Kris Kross + "Hip Hop Hooray" by Naughty by Nature + **"Geek" by Kid Milli, Ron**	1050	950	2000
**WeDemBoyz**	46 (Note: Including Insung, Jay Pak, and Locker 100)	"Murder" by Justin Timberlake + "Leave the Door Open" by Silk Sonic + **"Lit" by NCT (Taeyong and Mark)**	947	1050	1997
**YGX**	47 (Note: Including Baw, Boomball, Fawks, Super Dragon, Poker, Drama, Duck goo, Bravo, Begita, and Kaicho)	"Coming in Hot" by Lecrae, Andy Mineo + **"National Gymnastics" by Sokodomo** + "Ima Boss" by Meek Mill featuring Rick Ross	1019	900	1919

Rules of the second elimination battle
- Best of 5:
  - Round 1 – 3 on 3 Battle
  - Round 2 – Leader
  - Round 3 – Hidden Battle
  - Round 4 – Aces Battle
  - Round 5 – Crew Battle
- At the end of each round, the fight judges determine the winner
- The first crew to win three rounds is safe from elimination, while the losing crew is eliminated.

Second elimination battle
Round	Contestant		Winning team
Round	WeDemBoyz	YGX	Winning team
1	Vata, Insun, and Haesung	Deukie, Hyunse, and Dow	WeDemBoyz
2	Vata	Deukie	WeDemBoyz
3	Crew (except Vata)	Junsun, Dow, Hyunse, and Junho	WeDemBoyz

=== Mission 5: "Rain's New Dance Song Choreography" ===
Each crew will create new choreography for Rain's new single "Domestic". The crew whose choreography is chosen by Rain have the benefit to direct the music video and the crew whose choreography video (Note: Videos were posted on YouTube by Mnet on The Choom channel on October 12. Voting period from October 12, 2022, to October 17, 2022, at 6:00 pm (KST)) receives the most likes will receive 100 extra points each.

"Rain New Dance Song Mission"
Crew	Main Dancer	Scores			
Crew	Main Dancer	Public Vote	Rain's chosen choreography	Extra points for Most video likes	Total Score
Mbitious	Lee Ho-won	1000	–	100	1100
1Million	Back Koo-young	950	–	–	950
Just Jerk	Howl	900	–	–	900
BankTwoBrothers	Feeldog	850	–	–	850
WeDemBoyz	Vata	800	100	–	900
Eo-Ddae	E Jo	750	–	–	750

=== Mission 6: "Muse of Street Man Fighter" ===
Each crew will be joined by female dancers and must create and perform original choreography.

Final scores are calculated as the sum of the Fight Judges' Score + Global Popular Vote Score + Experts' Jury Score + Rain's New Dance Song Choreography Score.

Scoring system
- Fight Judges' Score: Each judge awards up to 100 points to each crew totaling up to 300 points.
- Global Popular Vote Score: Voting period from October 19, 2022, at 12:00 AM KST to 15:53 PM KST. (Note: Videos were posted on YouTube by Mnet on The Choom channel on October 19 but a playback error on 1Million video occurred around 3:40 pm KST so it was decided that all videos were made to private. After 5 hours of discussions of each crew leaders and SMF staffs both agreed to close the voting at 3:53 pm KST. Restricted to South Korea only.) Score calculated as Views + Likes X 100. Crews are ranked from this score and awarded points starting at 1000 points for the highest score.
- Expert Juries' Score: Calculated as the average score of real-time on-site voting scores of 100 expert juries for each genre.

"Muse of Street Man Fighter" Mission
Crew	Females dancers	Song selection	Scores					
Crew	Females dancers	Song selection	Fight judges	Public vote	Expert juries	Rain mission		Total
Crew	Females dancers	Song selection	Fight judges	Public vote	Expert juries	Public vote	Extra points	Total
**BankTwoBrothers**	PROWDMON	"Arson" by J-Hope	264	850	91.36	850	–	2,055.38
**Eo-Ddae** (Note: BlackQ did not participate in the Rain challenge due to his commitments with NewJeans comeback later that year.)	Funky Y WAACKXXXY; YOON JI	"Vogue" by Madonna + "Cuba" by Gibson Brothers	287	800	90.88	750	–	1,927.8
**MBitious**	LACHICA	"ALREADY" by Beyoncé, Shatta Wale and Major Laser + "Water" by Salatiel, Pharrell Williams and Beyoncé	244	900	84.97	1000	100	2,328.978
**1Million**	Ji soo Kim; Mi Ri Kwak; Yuna Han; Onliseo	"Iron" + "Run Boy Run" by Woodkid + "I Like It" by Cardi B, Bad Bunny, and J Balvin	288	750	92.53	950	–	2,080.53
**WeDemBoyz** (Note: On October 6, 2022, Kamel made his military enlistment. Thus, ending his stay on the show. His last appearances were at the beginning of the Muse of SMF and Rain New Song Dance Challenges but did not participate at the actual missions. He returned for the final episode of SMF as a spectator.)	HOOK	"Sexy Nukim" (섹시느낌) by Balming Tiger featuring RM of BTS	275	950	93.73	800	100	2,218.73
**JustJerk**	Soojin CHOI; Lee Yoon-hee; Shin sun mi	"Desire" (self-produced song by Just Jerk)	299	1000	96.83	900	–	2,295.83

As the lowest scoring crew, Eo-Ddae was automatically eliminated. BankTwoBrothers and 1Million will have an elimination battle for the last spot in the finals as the 4th and 5th place crews.

Rules of the third elimination battle
- Best of 5:
  - Round 1 – Hidden Battle
  - Round 2 – 1v1 (The crew whose water bottle would point at would have the benefit of picking their opponent)
  - Round 3 – 1v1 (Winner of the previous round will have a chance to choose their own opponent)
  - Round 4 – Crew Battle
  - Round 5 – Leader
- At the end of each round, the fight judges determine the winner
- The first crew to win three rounds is safe from elimination, while the losing crew is eliminated.

Semi-final elimination battle
Round	Contestant		Winning team
Round	BankTwoBrothers	1Million	Winning team
1	Crew	Crew	1Million
2	Giseok	Yumeki	BankTwoBrothers
3	Feeldog	Nino	BankTwoBrothers
4	Crew (except J-Roc)	Crew (except Back Koo-young)	1Million
5	J-Roc	Back Koo-young	BankTwoBrothers

=== Mission 7: "Cheers" ===
Each crew will create a performance that highlights their happy moments.

Scoring system
- Live Broadcast Vote Score (100%): via SMS voting (limited to South Korea only)
- The team with the most total cumulative score from both Cheers and Last dance missions will be declare the show's winner.

"Cheers" mission
Crew	Song selection
**BankTwoBrothers**	"Good Morning Seoul" by Nucksal & Cadejo
**MBitious** (Note: Despite dropping out of the show, Kim Jung-woo made his return and performed with all the members in this round.)	Intro ("SMF" By Changmo) + "Bubblin" by Anderson .Paak
**WeDemBoyz**	"Love You Different" by Justin Bieber featuring Beam
**JustJerk**	"How It's Done" by Candy Dulfer

=== Mission 8: "Last Dance" ===
Each crew will create a performance that shows the color and identity representing them.

Scoring system
- Live Broadcast Vote Score (100%): via SMS voting (limited to South Korea only)
- The team with the most total cumulative score from both Cheers and Last dance missions will be declare the show's winner.

"Last Dance" mission
Crew	Song selection
**BankTwoBrothers**	"It Won't Kill Ya" (feat. Louane) by The Chainsmokers
**MBitious**	"Vossi Bop" by Stormzy
**WeDemBoyz**	"Heaven and Hell" by Kanye West
**JustJerk**	"Cornfield Chase" + "Invasion" (prod. by Minseo of Just Jerk)

Combined Finals Results (Cheers and Last Dance Missions)
Rank	Crew	Scores
1	**JustJerk**	92,321
2	**WeDemBoyz**	44,274
3	**Mbitious**	32,302
4	**BankTwoBrothers**	25,034

Indicates winner of Street Man Fighter
Indicates the 2nd place crew
Indicates the 3rd and 4th place crews

== Final ranking ==
Crews' final rankings
Rank	Crew	Notes
1st place, gold medalist(s)	JustJerk	Winner
2	WeDemBoyz	Runners-up
3	Mbitious	3rd place
4	BankTwoBrothers	4th place
5	1Million	Eliminated in episode 9
6	Eo-Ddae	Eliminated in episode 9
7	YGX	Eliminated in episode 7
8	Prime Kingz	Eliminated in episode 5

== Original soundtrack ==
=== Part 1 ===
Released on March 4, 2022
No.	Title	Lyrics	Music	Artist	Length
1.	"SMF" (produced by Czaer)	Changmo	Czaer; MarkAlong; Bashment YC	Changmo	2:16
2.	"SMF" (performance version)		Czaer; MarkAlong; Bashment YC		1:24
Total length:					3:40

=== Part 2 ===
Released on August 23, 2022
No.	Title	Lyrics	Music	Artist	Length
1.	"Gulliver"	Lee Chan-hyuk	Czaer; Riskypizza; Dee.P	Kang Seung-yoon	3:03
2.	"Remember Us"	Kang Daniel; Y0ung	Czaer; Riskypizza; B-Right	Kang Daniel	3:57
3.	"Young Forever"	Riskypizza	Czaer; Riskypizza	TO1	3:42
4.	"Hypothetical" (featuring Doyle Untold)	Riskypizza; Louise Linnéa	Czaer; Riskypizza; Louise Linnéa	Linnéa; Doyle Untold	2:43
Total length:					13:27

=== Part 3 ===
Released on September 6, 2022
No.	Title	Lyrics	Music	Artist	Length
1.	"New Thing" (새삥; featuring Homies; produced by Zico)	Zico; CK; Louie	Zico; Poptime	Zico; Homies	2:27
2.	"Law" (produced by Czaer)	Yoon Mi-rae; Bibi	Czaer; Advanced; RYS	Yoon Mi-rae; Bibi	3:09
3.	"Sweaty" (featuring Loco, Coogie; produced by Gray)	Loco; Coogie	Gray; Loco; Coogie	Gray; Loco; Coogie	2:16
4.	"Whistle" (featuring Sik-K, Mirani; produced by GroovyRoom)	Sik-K; Mirani	GroovyRoom; Sik-K; Mirani	GroovyRoom; Sik-K; Mirani	2:44
5.	"100 °C" (featuring Yunhway; produced by Giriboy, Yeoho)	Giriboy; Yunhway	Giriboy; Yeoho; Tuna	Giriboy; Yunhway	3:12
Total length:					13:50

=== Part 4 ===
Released on September 20, 2022
No.	Title	Lyrics	Music	Artist	Length
1.	"National Gymnastics" (국민체조; produced by Czaer)	Sokodomo	Czaer; Haechi; MarkAlong; Stephen Lee; Sokodomo	Sokodomo	3:03
2.	"Blow Out" (produced by Czaer)	Zior Park; Mommy Son	Czaer; MarkAlong; Majoris	Zior Park; Mommy Son	3:21
3.	"Geek" (produced by Czaer)	Kid Milli; Ron	Czaer; Advanced; RYS; Kangho	Kid Milli; Ron	2:46
4.	"Groove" (produced by Czaer)	Jo Gwang-il	Czaer; MarkAlong; Stephen Lee; Bomi	Jo Gwang-il	3:06
5.	"Heyday" (produced by Czaer)	Bang Chan (3Racha); Changbin (3Racha); Han (3Racha)	Czaer; MarkAlong; Stephen Lee; Bashment YC; OWO; Bang Chan; Changbin; Han	Stray Kids	2:24
6.	"Lit" (produced by Czaer)	Taeyong; Mark	Czaer; Haechi; Kirin	Taeyong; Mark	3:15
7.	"Nunu" (produced by Czaer)	Loopy	Czaer; Advanced	Loopy	3:06
Total length:					21:05

== Viewership ==
Street Man Fighter : South Korea viewers per episode (thousands)

Season	Episode number										Average
Season	1	2	3	4	5	6	7	8	9	10	Average
2	311	309	366	461	355	409	388	461	406	322	379

Source: Audience measurement performed nationwide by Nielsen Korea.

Average TV viewership ratings
Ep.	Original broadcast date	Average audience share (Nielsen Korea)	
Ep.	Original broadcast date	Nationwide	Seoul
1	August 23, 2022	1.300% (7th)	1.868% (4th)
2	August 30, 2022	1.307% (7th)	1.987% (3rd)
3	September 6, 2022	1.680% (8th)	2.285% (3rd)
4	September 13, 2022	1.912% (3rd)	2.810% (2nd)
5	September 20, 2022	1.548% (4th)	2.401% (2nd)
6	October 4, 2022	1.828% (3rd)	2.998% (2nd)
7	October 11, 2022	1.669% (3rd)	2.636% (2nd)
8	October 18, 2022	1.620% (4th)	2.601% (2nd)
9	October 25, 2022	1.599% (4th)	2.355% (2nd)
10	November 8, 2022 (Note: Originally scheduled to air Episodes 10 and 11 on November 1 and 8, 2022 respectively, MNET decided to postponed the broadcast to observe the Nationwide mourning in light of the Itaewon Halloween crowd crush. On November 6, 2022, MNET announced that Episode 10 will be aired live on November 8, 2022, and will serve as the show's final episode.)	1.378% (5th)	2.072% (3rd)
Average		1.584%	2.401%
In the table above, the blue numbers represent the lowest ratings and the red numbers represent the highest ratings.; This show aired on a cable channel/pay TV which normally has a relatively smaller audience compared to free-to-air TV/public broadcasters (KBS, SBS, MBC and EBS).

== See also ==
- Be Mbitious
