= Street Woman Fighter =

2021 South Korean reality dance series

- Season 1
- Promotional poster
- Native name
- Hangul: 스트릿 우먼 파이터
- RR: Seuteurit umeon paiteo
- MR: Sŭt'ŭrit umŏn p'ait'ŏ
- Hosted by: Kang Daniel
- Judges: BoA; Taeyong; Hwang Sang-hoon
- No. of teams: 8
- Winner: HolyBang (Note: Members: Honey J, Hertz, Eevee, Taro, Jane, Mull, Lo-A, Belle)
- No. of episodes: 9

Release
- Original network: Mnet
- Original release: August 18 – October 26, 2021

Season chronology
- Next → Street Man Fighter

Street Woman Fighter (Korean: 스트릿 우먼 파이터), often abbreviated as SWF, is the debut season of a South Korean dance competition franchise of the same name. It aired on Mnet from August 24 to October 26, 2021, every Tuesday at 22:20 (KST) time slot for 9 episodes. It revolved around eight female dance crews fighting for the position of Korea's best female dance crew to represent street dance in the country (loosely marketed under the term "K-dance").

The winning crew (HolyBang) received ₩50 million, a sponsorship deal with Budweiser, and the Street Woman Fighter trophy.

The second season of the show, Street Man Fighter, aired in 2022 with the same show format but with male contestants. Subsequently, a third season, Street Woman Fighter 2, returned in 2023, with new female dance crews.

== Cast ==
The program is presented by Kang Daniel.

The judge panel in this season consists of three dancers from SM Entertainment:

- BoA
- Taeyong (NCT)
- Hwang Sang-hoon

=== Special guests ===
==== "4 Legends of K-pop" mission (episode 4) ====
- Hyuna
- CL
- Jessi

==== "Mega Crew" mission (episodes 5–6) ====
- Sooyoung (Girls' Generation)
- Choi Yoo-jung (Weki Meki)
- Yves
- Lee Young-Ji

==== "Jessi Choreography" mission (episode 7) ====
- Jessi
- Psy

==== "Men of Women" Mission (episodes 7–8) ====
- Jay Park
- Jo Kwon (2AM)

==== "Performance Sound Source" mission (episode 9) ====
- CL
- Sunmi
- Simon Dominic
- Loco
- Chungha

==== Street Woman Fighter: Gala Talkshow (special episodes) ====
- Haha
- Jang Do-yeon

== Contestants ==
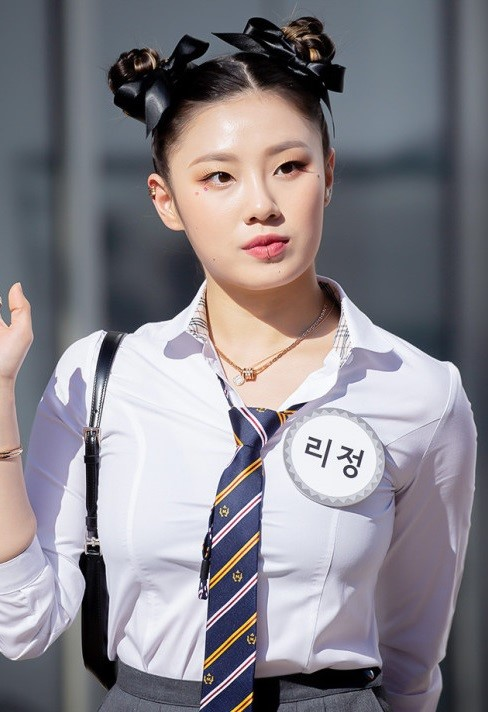
Leejung Lee in 2021 on her way to film an episode of Knowing Bros.

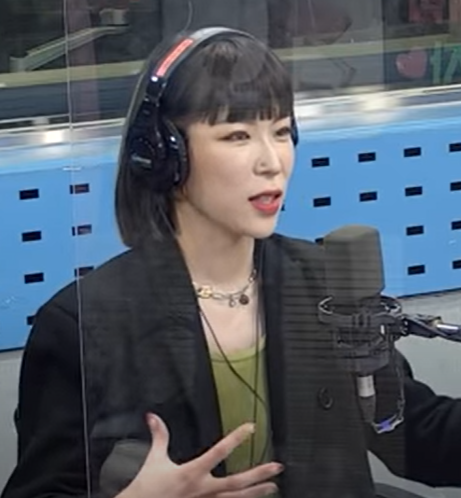
Hyojin Choi in 2021

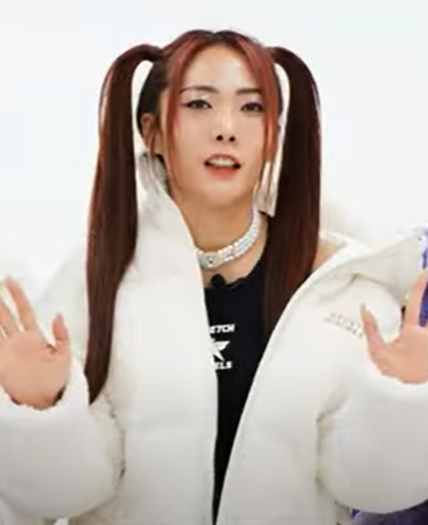
Honey J in 2021

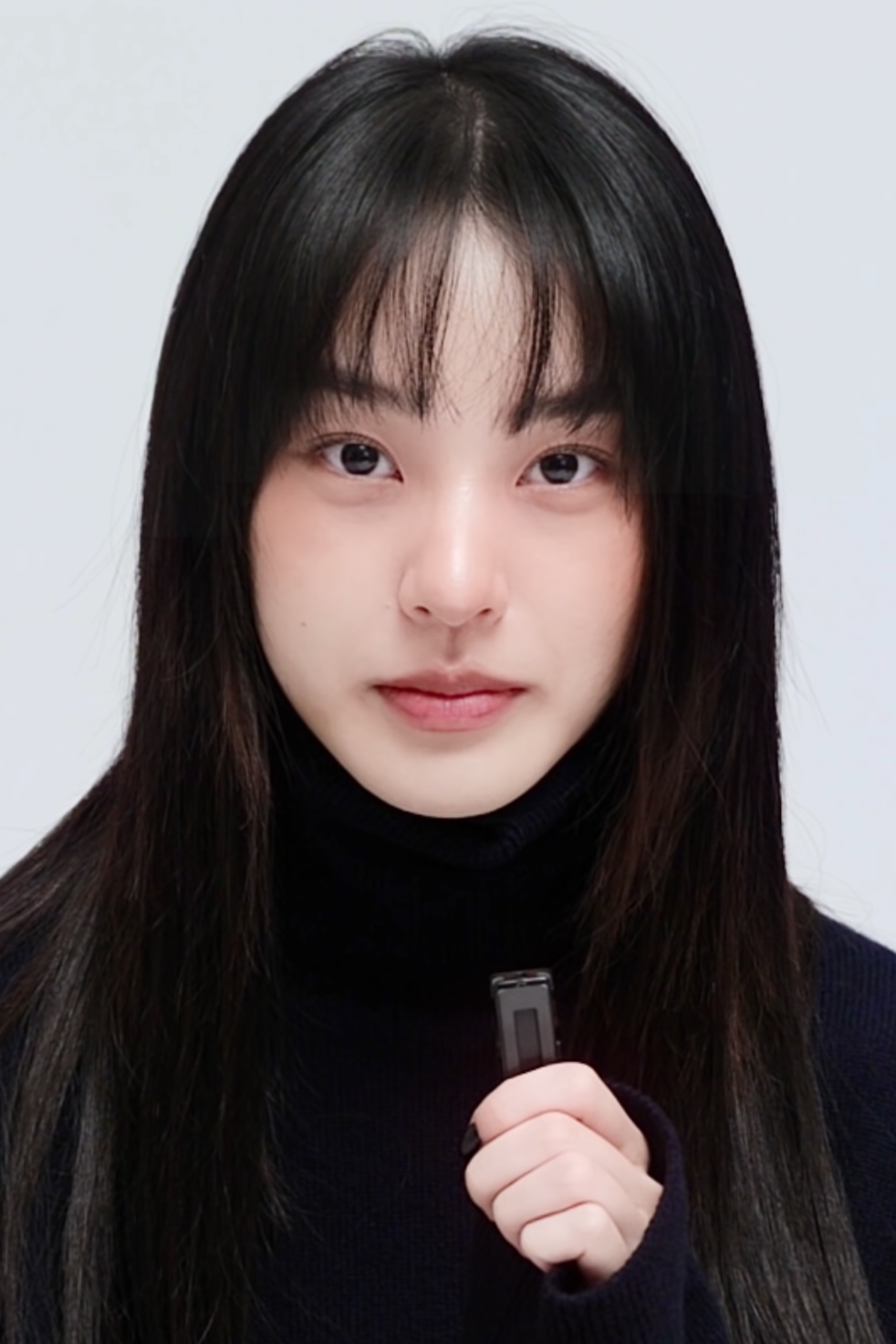
Noze in 2021

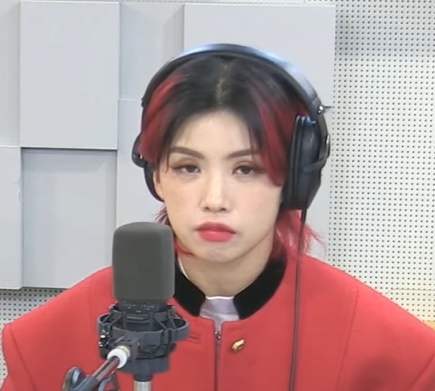
Aiki, leader of the dance crew HOOK in the show doing an interview in 2021.

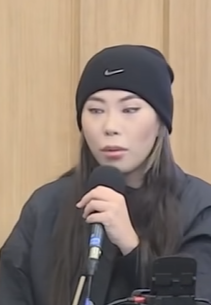
Gabee in 2021 doing an interview

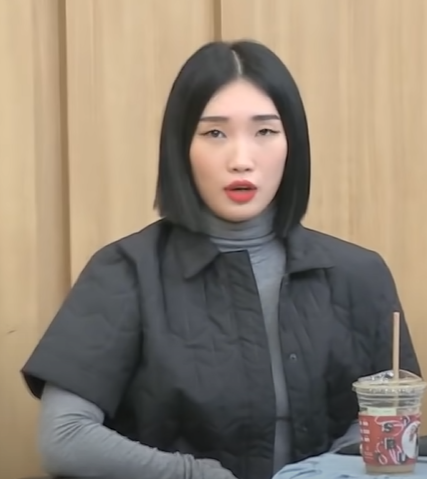
Lip J, member of the dance crew PROWDMON doing an interview in 2021

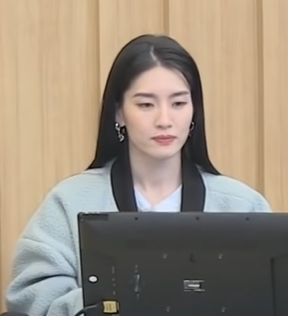
Monika, leader of the dance crew PROWDMON doing an interview in 2021

Color key:

- Leader

List of Street Woman Fighter contestants
Crew	Name	Birthday	Notes
YGX	Leejung Lee (이정)	August 9, 1998 (age 28)	Choreographer for TWICE, ITZY, Sunmi, Somi, BLACKPINK, iKON; Former member of Just Jerk Crew. Member of YGX's NWX crew.
YGX	Yeojin (여진)	October 9, 1994 (age 32)	Member of YGX's NWX crew.
YGX	Jihyo (지효)	October 22, 1996 (age 30)	Member of YGX's NWX crew.
YGX	Isak (이삭)	March 2, 1997 (age 29)	Member of YGX's Crazy dance crew
YGX	Yell (예리)	March 24, 2000 (age 26)	2018 Summer Youth Olympics B-Girl 1v1 Bronze Medallist
Lachica	Gabee (가비)	November 3, 1993 (age 33)	Choreographer (with Rian and Simeez) for BoA, Yubin, Chungha, CLC, TWICE, Natty. Formerly known as "Single Lady" during her underground dance battle days.
Lachica	Peanut (피넛)	May 7, 1990 (age 36)	Professional Waacker
Lachica	Rian (리안)	September 11, 1993 (age 33)	Choreographer for Chungha, Hyoyeon, Weki Meki, Previously participated in season 2 of Dancing9
Lachica	H_1 (에이치원)	October 29, 1994 (age 32)	Choreographer and back-up dancer for Hwasa
Lachica	Simeez (시미즈)	April 4, 1996 (age 30)	Choreographer for KARD, April, Rocket Girls 101
Want	Hyojin Choi (효진최)	January 20, 1992 (age 34)	Choreographer at 1Million Dance Studio
Want	Moana (모아나)	June 25, 1995 (age 31)	Choreographer for KARD's "Gunshot" (with Emma)
Want	Rozalin (로잘린)	September 15, 1997 (age 29)	Choreographer for aespa, Weeekly
Want	Lee Chaeyeon (이채연)	January 11, 2000 (age 26)	Former IZ*ONE member and current solo artist under WM Entertainment. Older sister of current ITZY member Chaeryeong.
Want	Emma (엠마)	April 26, 2000 (age 26)	Choreographer for KARD's "Gunshot" (with Moana) and Badvillain member.
WayB	Noze (노제)	February 12, 1996 (age 30)	Dancer for Kai's "Mmmh", Taemin's "Advice"
WayB	Dolla (돌라)	January 15, 1996 (age 30)	
WayB	Ansso (안쏘)	August 1, 1997 (age 29)	
WayB	Lee Su (리수)	July 1, 2000 (age 26)	Dancer for Kai's "Mmmh" (with Noze), and The Boyz
WayB	Gyuri An (규리안)	January 6, 2002 (age 24)	
CocaNButter	Rihey (리헤이)	April 17, 1990 (age 36)	Former member of PURPLOW Dance crew which members includes its former leader and now Holy Bang leader Honey J, and current CocaNButter members Gaga, Bicki, Zsun, and Jillin. Choreographer at Bangall Dance Academy
CocaNButter	ZSun (제트썬)	March 29, 1990 (age 36)	Former member of PURPLOW Dance crew. Choreographer for KARD. Former Dancehall singer previously signed under Luminant Entertainment.
CocaNButter	Gaga (가가)	July 4, 1993 (age 33)	Former member of PURPLOW Dance crew. Choreographer at Bangall Dance Academy
CocaNButter	Bicki (비키)	March 20, 1994 (age 32)	Former member of PURPLOW Dance crew.
CocaNButter	Jillin (질린)	August 16, 1994 (age 32)	Former member of PURPLOW Dance crew.
Prowdmon	Monika (모니카)	June 22, 1986 (age 40)	Known as the "Teacher of all Dancers" as she was the Dance Professor for most of the contestants during their college years. Choreographer for Amoeba Culture. Member of WooFam. One half of the dance duo MOLIP with fellow PRODWMON member Lip J.
Prowdmon	Lip J (립제이)	July 30, 1988 (age 38)	World-renowned Waacking dancer. Choreographer for Amoeba Culture, Yubin, and Lee Hi. Member of dance duo MOLIP (with PRODWMON member Monika), ElizaBitch, and Team W.O.W. (World Of Waackers).
Prowdmon	Ham.G (함지)	December 5, 1995 (age 30)	Choreographer at OFD Studio
Prowdmon	DIA (다이아)	October 28, 1996 (age 30)	Choreographer at OFD Studio
Prowdmon	Hyeily (헤일리)	May 5, 1999 (age 27)	Choreographer at OFD Studio
Prowdmon	Rosy (로지)	August 13, 1999 (age 27)	Choreographer at OFD Studio. Former YG Entertainment trainee.
Prowdmon	Kayday (케이데이)	November 1, 1999 (age 27)	Choreographer at OFD Studio
HolyBang	Honey J (허니제이)	August 26, 1987 (age 39)	Former leader of PURFLOW dance crew alongside current CoCaNButter members Rihey, Gaga, Jillin, ZSun, and Bicki. Long-time choreographer and tour dancer for Jay Park and AOMG.
HolyBang	Hertz (헤르츠)	November 20, 1992 (age 33)	
HolyBang	Eevee (이븨)	March 10, 1993 (age 33)	Tour dancer for Jay Park and AOMG.
HolyBang	Taro (타로)	April 1, 1994 (age 32)	
HolyBang	Jane (제인)	January 5, 1995 (age 31)	Tour dancer for Jay Park and AOMG.
HolyBang	Mull (뮬)	February 28, 1996 (age 30)	
HolyBang	Lo-A (로아)	August 3, 1996 (age 30)	
HolyBang	Belle (벨)	November 8, 1996 (age 30)	Missed the remainder of the show effective Episode 5 due to an ACL injury and underwent surgery.
Hook	Aiki (아이키)	September 7, 1989 (age 37)	World of Dance Contestant (4th place), Choreographer of Refund Sisters' "Don't Touch Me", Bibi, Queen Wassabii and Mamamoo Moonbyul "Lunatic". Mentor of MBC's My Teenage Girl
Hook	Rageon (뤠이젼)	May 22, 1999 (age 27)	Student at Aiki's Real Beat Studio.
Hook	Odd (오드)	November 3, 1999 (age 27)	Student at Aiki's Real Beat Studio.
Hook	Born (예본)	February 24, 2000 (age 26)	Student at Aiki's Real Beat Studio.
Hook	Hyowoo (효우)	October 11, 2000 (age 26)	Student at Aiki's Real Beat Studio.
Hook	Sung Jiyeon (성지연)	January 27, 2003 (age 23)	Student at Aiki's Real Beat Studio.
Hook	Seon Yoonkyung (선윤경)	October 22, 2003 (age 23)	Student at Aiki's Real Beat Studio.

== Episodes ==
=== Exclusive preview (August 18, 2021) ===
Released on the Mnet TV YouTube channel on August 18, 2021. All participating crews are introduced while they enter into their separate rooms. Each crew produces a personal ranking of all participating crews which is shown to each crew. Each crew are called to the main lobby where they are shown a video of their impressions from other participating crews and then seated at their designated area. Each dancer also selects the person that they think is the weakest dancer, and the selected person receives a "No Respect" Sticker.

The exclusive preview ends with a preview of the first episode where Kang Daniel explains the first mission; various dance battle previews can be seen along with reactions from Kang Daniel, the participants, and the judges.

=== Episode 1 (August 24, 2021) ===
The first part of the episode is the same as the exclusive preview with the introductions of the crews, personal rankings, impression videos, and "No Respect" selection.

Kang Daniel introduces the judges and explains the first mission, Battle of the Underdog, a dance battle between two participants where one calls out another they think they are better than. The episode ends with the a preview of the battle between HolyBang leader Honey J and CocaNButter leader Rihey, who used to be in the same dance crew but disbanded.

=== Episode 2 (August 31, 2021) ===
The first mission continues starting with a battle between Lachica's Rian and WayB leader Noze. YGX and CocaNButter were tied with the same number of wins in the final rankings and so YGX leader Leejung had a tiebreaker battle against CocaNButter's Bicki in which YGX was ultimately declared the winner of the first mission. They were given access to the penthouse as the prize.

The second mission, the Rank Mission, was announced: each leader select five dancers including themselves to represent their crew in each rank (Leader Rank, Second Rank, Sub Rank, (Note: Two in the Sub Rank) Assist Rank). Each rank would only have one main dancer, chosen by the judges while the rest will be backup dancers. Each member of each rank made a short choreography to be used in the main dancer evaluation which was voted on by the members of the rank. The main dancer evaluation begins with the Assist Rank in which Prowdmon's Hyeily was chosen. The episode ends with the Leader Rank evaluation with WayB's Noze being chosen.

=== Episode 3 (September 7, 2021) ===
The second mission continues starting with the main dancer evaluation for the Sub rank. Instead of one dancer from each team, there are two and both members from one team will be the main dancers. Want's Emma and Moana were selected as the main dancers. Lachica's Rian is chosen as main dancer for the Second rank. The choreography video recording is then shown for each rank followed by the choreography video itself. After the choreography video is shown, the main dancer then picks the Worst Dancer in their rank. The chosen Worst Dancers are: Prowdmon's Monika from the Leader Rank, HolyBang's Jane from the Second Rank, YGX's Jihyo and Yeojin from the Sub Rank, and HOOK's Yoonkyung Seon from the Assist Rank.

The chosen Worst Dancers can choose another dancer in their rank who they think is the Worst Dancer to battle, excluding the Main Dancer. The loser, chosen by the remaining dancers, becomes the Worst Dancer for their rank. The chosen battlers are: HolyBang's Honey J from the Leader Rank, WayB's Leesu from the Second Rank, Hook's Born and Hyowoo from the Sub Ranks, and Want's Lee Chaeyeon from the Assist Class. The final Worst Dancers are: HolyBang's Honey J, WayB's Leesu, YGX's Yeojin and Jihyo, and Want's Lee Chaeyeon.

The third mission was announced as the 4 Queens of K-Pop Mission where two crews will battle against each other using the same songs. PROWDMON was chosen by the judges as the MVP Crew and thus are allowed to create the matchup bracket for the third mission, choosing which crews battle each other with whose song. It was also announced that a crew will be eliminated after the next mission.

=== Episode 4 (September 14, 2021) ===
The third mission begins with a showdown between Prowdmon and WayB with a special video evaluation appearance from CL, whose songs the two crews are using. The performance videos are shown and the fight judges' scores are revealed with Prowdmon coming out on top. The next battle is between CocaNButter and Hook who are performing to Hyuna's songs. Hook wins this round. The next battle is between Lachica and HolyBang, performing to Jessi's song with a special video evaluation appearance of the latter and Psy. Lachica wins. The last battle is between YGX and Want performing to fight judge BoA's songs. YGX wins. After all the fight judges' scores are revealed, the final score is calculated with the Global Popular Vote Score and the Main Dancer and Worst Dancer scores from the last mission. YGX, Prowdmon, Lachica, and Hook win their matchup while Want, WayB, HolyBang, and CocaNButter are up for elimination.

It is announced that two teams will battle it out with the loser being eliminated. CocaNButter is automatically placed in the battle having the lowest overall score. The second team is chosen by YGX, who had the highest overall score. WANT cannot be chosen and is safe from elimination because they had the highest scores among those who lost. YGX chooses WAYB.

CocaNButter faces off against WAYB in a best-of-five dance battle in a similar style to the first mission. CocaNButter comes out on top and WAYB is eliminated.

=== Episode 5 (September 28, 2021) ===
Note: (Note: No new episode was shown on September 21, 2021, due to Chuseok. A highlight episode was shown instead with a special highlight on WAYB)

The episode starts with the 7 surviving crews enjoying a pool party on the penthouse. Afterwards, each crew went to their respective hideout where the fourth mission, the Mega Crew Mission, is introduced. Each crew will create and perform a choreography with a minimum of 25 performers who must be recruited personally by each crew. Weki Meki's Choi Yoo-jung, Loona's Yves, and Lee Young-ji appear as guest performers with WANT. Girls' Generation's Sooyoung appears as a guest performer with HOOK.

The performances and Judges' scores of Lachica, HolyBang, CocaNButter, Prowdmon, and Hook were shown in this episode.

=== Episode 6 (October 5, 2021) ===
The Mega Crew Mission continues with the performances and Judges' scores for YGX and Want being revealed. The Global Popular Vote Scores for all the crews are revealed and added to their Judges' scores to calculate the final scores. HolyBang wins this mission with the highest overall score. The three crews with the lowest scores are Lachica, CocaNButter, and Want, and nominated for elimination.

It is announced that two teams will battle it out with the loser being eliminated. Lachica is automatically placed in the battle having the lowest overall score. The second team is chosen by HolyBang, who had the highest overall score. HolyBang chooses Want.

Lachica faces off against Want in a best-of-seven dance battle. After an intense battle, Lachica comes out on top and Want is eliminated.

The next mission, the P Nation Choreography Mission, is revealed in which each crew will make a choreography for P Nation artist Jessi's new song "Cold Blooded". Jessi makes a guest appearance to announce the song.

=== Episode 7 (October 12, 2021) ===
The semifinal round is revealed to be 2 missions which scores will be combined. It is also revealed that only 4 crews will be in the finals, meaning that 2 crews will be eliminated for this round.

The first mission is the Jessi Choreography Mission. Each crew will make a choreography for Jessi's new single "Cold Blooded" and Jessi and Psy will pick the best choreography. Each team's choreography is shown and Jessi and Psy pick YGX's choreography as the best one. YGX will receive extra points and will have to opportunity to direct the music video. All crews participate in the music video.

The second mission is the Men of Women Mission, where each crew must recruit male dancers and create a mixed choreography. 2AM's Jo Kwon appears as a guest dancer with Lachica. Jay Park appears as a guest dancer with HolyBang.

The performances and Judges' scores of Lachica, Hook, and CocaNButter were shown in this episode.

=== Episode 8 (October 19, 2021) ===
The Men of Women Mission continues with the performances and Judges' scores for HolyBang, Prowdmon and YGX being revealed.

The Global Popular Vote Scores for all the crews are revealed and added to their Judges' scores in addition to the Jessi Choreography Mission score to calculate the final scores. Hook, HolyBang, and CocaNButter have the three highest scores and move onto the final round. YGX and LACHICA placed 4th and 5th and were nominated for elimination. PROWDMON had the lowest score and was automatically eliminated.

Lachica faces off against YGX in a best-of-five dance battle. After an intense battle, Lachica comes out on top and YGX is eliminated.

The finals is revealed to be another 2 part mission, the first being the Performance Sound Source Mission, where each crew will team up with an artist and create a new choreography to the artist's song, and the second being the Color of Crew Mission, where each crew will create and perform a choreography that shows off each crew's color.

=== Episode 9 (October 26, 2021) ===
This episode is the live finale of the program competition. The finals is composed of two missions, the Performance Song Mission and the Color of Crew Mission. The winner will be decided based on the following criteria: 70% live voting + 30% Global Popular Vote. (Note: Voting took place on the official Mnet YouTube channel from October 20, 2021, at 3:00 AM KST to October 25, 2021, at 12:00 PM KST) Audience members in attendance include the four crews eliminated in the previous episodes, YGX, PROWDMON, WANT, and WAYB.

The four finalist dance crews, HolyBang, Hook, Lachica, and CocaNButter, started the finale off with a performance to "7 Rings" by Ariana Grande.

The Performance Song Mission is the first mission to take place. In this mission, musical artists gift songs to the dance crews which will then create a performance with the song. Chungha gifted "Bad Girl" to Lachica. CL gifted "Caviar" to CocaNButter. Simon Dominic and Loco gifted "No Break" to HolyBang. Sunmi gifted "Too young to die" to HOOK.

In the Color of Crew Mission, each crew will create a performance that expresses the color of each crew. The performances order are Lachica, CocaNButter, HolyBang, and Hook.

All the leaders of the crews gave a special performance of "Hey Mama" by David Guetta from the Rank Mission.

During the winner's announcement, Lachica and CocaNButter came in third and fourth respectively. HolyBang was announced as the winner leaving HOOK as runner-up.

== Missions ==
=== Mission 1: "Battle of the Underdog" ===
Each dancer beforehand pointed out a dancer from an opposing team that they can beat in a one-on-one dance battle. The chosen dancer is given a "No Respect" Sticker for each time they are chosen.

Rules for the dance battles
- The named dancer points out a dancer they consider to be the weakest, and engages in a one-on-one dance battle for 40 seconds each.
- The named dancer goes first while the pointed out dancer goes second.
- At the end of the battle, the Fight Judges will determine the winner.
- Fight Judges can request a rematch when no winner can be decided. A rematch will take place if two or more judges cannot decide a winner or in the case of a 1:1 tie and the third judge cannot choose a winner. In the rematch, both dancers dance at the same time for 40 seconds.
- The winning dancer receives a gold chip for their team while the loser receives a black chip for their team
- The team with the most losses are labeled as the NO RESPECT Crew.

"No Respect" stickers
Crew	Name	No. of stickers	Total
**YGX**	Leejung Lee (리정)	2	7 stickers
**YGX**	Yeojin (여진)	1	7 stickers
**YGX**	Isak (이삭)	1	7 stickers
**YGX**	Jihyo (지효)	3	7 stickers
**Lachica**	Gabee (가비)	2	9 stickers
**Lachica**	Rian (리안)	2	9 stickers
**Lachica**	Simeez (시미즈)	4	9 stickers
**Lachica**	Peanut (피넛)	1	9 stickers
**Want**	Hyojin Choi (효진초이)	1	7 stickers
**Want**	Lee Chaeyeon (이채연)	6	7 stickers
**WayB**	Noze (노제)	2	4 stickers
**WayB**	Dolla (돌라)	1	4 stickers
**WayB**	Lee Su (리수)	1	4 stickers
**CocaNButter**	Rihey (리헤이)	2	6 stickers
**CocaNButter**	Gaga (가가)	1	6 stickers
**CocaNButter**	ZSun (제트썬)	2	6 stickers
**CocaNButter**	Jillin (질린)	1	6 stickers
**Prowdmon**	Monika (모니카)	1	6 stickers
**Prowdmon**	Rosy (로지)	1	6 stickers
**Prowdmon**	Lip J (립제이)	2	6 stickers
**Prowdmon**	Kayday (케이데이)	1	6 stickers
**Prowdmon**	Hyeily (헤일리)	1	6 stickers
**HolyBang**	Honey J	1	4 stickers
**HolyBang**	Belle (벨)	1	4 stickers
**HolyBang**	Jane (제인)	1	4 stickers
**HolyBang**	Taro (타로)	1	4 stickers
**Hook**	Aiki (아이키)	2	4 stickers
**Hook**	Rageon (뤠이젼)	1	4 stickers
**Hook**	Odd (오드)	1	4 stickers
Total			**47 stickers**

Color key:

- Winner (Note: Full version of unaired battles were posted on YouTube by Mnet on August 25 (Episode 1) and September 1 (Episode 2))

Underdog battles from ep. 1–2
Round	Team (Note: Team colours adjusted for readability)	Contestant	Votes
1	Lachica	Simeez	1
1	YGX	Lee Jung	2
2	YGX	Lee Jung	3
2	WANT	Lee Chaeyeon	0
3	Lachica	Gabee	2
3	Hook	Aiki	1
4	YGX	Yell	0
4	CocaNButter	ZSun	3
5	CocaNButter	ZSun	0
5	Prowdmon	Monika	3
6	Lachica	Peanut	0
6	Prowdmon	Lip J	3
7	Lachica	Rian	3
7	WayB	Noze	0
8	HolyBang	Taro	1
8	Want	Lee Chaeyeon	2
9	Want	Rozalin	2
9	Prowdmon	Lip J	1
10	CocaNButter	Rihey	2
10	HolyBang	Honey J	1
11 (Note: YGX and CocaNButter were tied in score. Each team sent a member to battle in a tiebreaker)	YGX	Lee Jung	2
11	CocaNButter	Bicki	1

Unaired battles
Round	Team	Contestant	Votes
11	Hook	Odd	1
11	CocaNButter	Gaga	2
12	Prowdmon	KayDay	1
12	Lachica	Simeez	2
13	Want	Lee Chaeyeon	Unrevealed
13	Prowdmon	Rosy	Unrevealed
14	YGX	Jihyo	Unrevealed
14	Want	Lee Chaeyeon	Unrevealed
15	WayB	Dolla	Unrevealed
15	Want	Lee Chaeyeon	Unrevealed
16	WayB	Dolla	Unrevealed
16	YGX	Isak	Unrevealed
17	Want	Hyojin Choi	Unrevealed
17	CocaNButter	Rihey	Unrevealed
18	CocaNButter	Gaga	0
18	LACHICA	Peanut	3
19	HOOK	Aiki	Unrevealed
19	WANT	Hyojin Choi	Unrevealed
20	YGX	Yeojin	Unrevealed
20	WayB	Noze	Unrevealed
21	CocaNButter	jillin	Unrevealed
21	HolyBang	Hertz	Unrevealed
22	Want	Lee Chaeyeon	Unrevealed
22	Hook	Sung Jiyeon	Unrevealed
23	Hook	Sung Jiyeon	Unrevealed
23	Want	Moana	Unrevealed
24	Prowdmon	Monika	Unrevealed
24	YGX	Jihyo	Unrevealed
25	HolyBang	Belle	Unrevealed
25	Prowdmon	Rosy	Unrevealed

Ranking
Rank	Crew	Wins	Losses
1	YGX	7	4
2	CocaNButter	6	5
3	Prowdmon	5	3
4	Want	5	7
5	Lachica	4	5
6	WayB	3	2
7	HolyBang	2	3
8	Hook	1	4

=== Mission 2: "Ranking" ===
Each crew leader chooses five members (Note: 5 is the minimum number of dancers in a crew. As such, PROWDMON's DIA and Rosy, HOOK's Sung Jiyeon, and HolyBang's Mull, Eevee and Belle did not participate) including themselves to be split into four ranks. Each rank will work together to create a dance video. Each rank will only have one main dancer which will be chosen by the judges. The rest will be back-up dancers in the video. Each dancer in a rank will create a short choreography which will be voted on by the members of their rank. The chosen choreography will be the one used to determine the main dancer.

The main dancer's benefits
- In charge of the center position, choreography, and directing the video for their rank
- Receive 50 points for their crew
- Can designate the "worst dancer" in their rank to deduct 50 points from their crew

The worst dancer chosen by the main dancer can choose another dancer except for the main dancer in their rank that they think is the worst dancer. The chosen dancer will have a dance battle with the nominated worst dancer. At the end of the battle, all the dancers of the crews except for those of the battlers will vote for the worst dancer using a "Worst" token. The dancer with more "Worst" tokens is the worst dancer.

Color key:

- Main dancer(s)
- Worst dancer
- **Bold** denotes chosen choreographer

Ranking mission
Rank	Team	Contestant	Song selection
Leader Rank	YGX	Lee Jung	"Hey Mama" by David Guetta
Leader Rank	Lachica	Gabee	"Hey Mama" by David Guetta
Leader Rank	Want	Hyojin Choi	"Hey Mama" by David Guetta
Leader Rank	WayB	**Noze**	"Hey Mama" by David Guetta
Leader Rank	CocaNButter	Rihey	"Hey Mama" by David Guetta
Leader Rank	Prowdmon	Monika	"Hey Mama" by David Guetta
Leader Rank	HolyBang	Honey J	"Hey Mama" by David Guetta
Leader Rank	Hook	Aiki	"Hey Mama" by David Guetta
Second Rank	YGX	Yell	"Booty" by C. Tangana and Becky G + "Mi Gente" by J Balvin and Willy William
Second Rank	Lachica	Rian	"Booty" by C. Tangana and Becky G + "Mi Gente" by J Balvin and Willy William
Second Rank	Want	Rozalin	"Booty" by C. Tangana and Becky G + "Mi Gente" by J Balvin and Willy William
Second Rank	WayB	Lee Su	"Booty" by C. Tangana and Becky G + "Mi Gente" by J Balvin and Willy William
Second Rank	CocaNButter	ZSun	"Booty" by C. Tangana and Becky G + "Mi Gente" by J Balvin and Willy William
Second Rank	Prowdmon	**Lip J**	"Booty" by C. Tangana and Becky G + "Mi Gente" by J Balvin and Willy William
Second Rank	HolyBang	Jane	"Booty" by C. Tangana and Becky G + "Mi Gente" by J Balvin and Willy William
Second Rank	Hook	Rageon	"Booty" by C. Tangana and Becky G + "Mi Gente" by J Balvin and Willy William
Sub Rank	YGX	**Yeojin, Jihyo**	"Run the World (Girls)" by Beyoncé
Sub Rank	Lachica	H_1, Peanut	"Run the World (Girls)" by Beyoncé
Sub Rank	Want	Moana, Emma	"Run the World (Girls)" by Beyoncé
Sub Rank	WayB	Dolla, Ansso	"Run the World (Girls)" by Beyoncé
Sub Rank	CocaNButter	Gaga, jillin	"Run the World (Girls)" by Beyoncé
Sub Rank	Prowdmon	KayDay, Ham.G	"Run the World (Girls)" by Beyoncé
Sub Rank	HolyBang	Lo-A, Taro	"Run the World (Girls)" by Beyoncé
Sub Rank	Hook	Born, Hyowoo	"Run the World (Girls)" by Beyoncé
Assist Rank	YGX	Isak	"Pretty Savage" by Blackpink
Assist Rank	Lachica	**Simeez**	"Pretty Savage" by Blackpink
Assist Rank	Want	Lee Chaeyeon	"Pretty Savage" by Blackpink
Assist Rank	WayB	GyuriAn	"Pretty Savage" by Blackpink
Assist Rank	CocaNButter	Bicki	"Pretty Savage" by Blackpink
Assist Rank	Prowdmon	Hyeily	"Pretty Savage" by Blackpink
Assist Rank	HolyBang	Hertz	"Pretty Savage" by Blackpink
Assist Rank	Hook	Seon Yoonkyung	"Pretty Savage" by Blackpink

Color key:

- Winner

"Worst dancer" battle
Round	Team	Contestant	Votes
1	Prowdmon	Monika	6
1	HolyBang	Honey J	8 (Note: Excluding 13 abstained votes)
2	HolyBang	Jane	8
2	WayB	Lee Su	20
3	YGX	Yeojin, Jihyo	17
3	Hook	Hyowoo, BORN	12
4	Hook	Seon Yoonkyung	0
4	Want	Lee Chaeyeon	21 (Note: Excluding 7 abstained votes)

Points going towards next mission
Crew	Points	Notes
Prowdmon	+50	MVP crew
Lachica	+50	
Want	+50, -50	
WayB	+50, -50	
CocaNButter	–	
Hook	–	
YGX	-50	
HolyBang	-50	

Prowdmon was chosen as the MVP crew and will create the match-ups for the next mission.

=== Mission 3: "4 Queens of K-pop" ===
Two crews compete against each other using the same song from four "queens of K-pop", leading female solo artists: BoA, CL, Jessi, and Hyuna. Each crew must also complete the Choreography Copy Challenge.

Choreography Copy Challenge
- There are two copy challenge sections in each song
- Of the two sections, each crew must take one section and create the choreography that the other team must "copy" and incorporate into their choreography
- If both crews want the same sections, they must discuss it among themselves

The crew with the higher score for each battle wins and avoids elimination while the losing crew is nominated for elimination. Final scores are calculated as the sum of the Fight Judges' Score + Global Popular Vote Score + Main Dancer Score + Worst Dancer Score from the previous mission.

Scoring system
- Fight Judges' Score: Total of 200 points split between both crews
- Global Popular Vote Score: Voting period from July 12, 2021, at 11:30 AM KST to July 15, 2021, at 11:59 PM KST. (Note: Videos were posted on YouTube by Mnet on July 12) Score calculated as Views + Likes X 100. Crews are ranked from this score and awarded points in decreasing 50 point intervals starting at 600 points for the highest score.

Color key:

- Winner

"4 Queens of K-pop" mission
Crew	Song selection	Scores					
Crew	Song selection	BoA	Taeyong	Hwang Sang-hoon	Public vote	Previous Mission	Total
**WayB**	"Doctor Pepper" + "Hello Bitches" by CL	75	80	75	300	–	530
**Prowdmon**	"Doctor Pepper" + "Hello Bitches" by CL	125	120	125	450	+50	870
**CocaNButter** (Note: jillin did not participate due to work and taping schedule conflicts.)	"Crazy" - 4Minute + "I'm Not Cool" + "Lip & Hip" by Hyuna	70	80	75	250	–	475
**Hook**	"Crazy" - 4Minute + "I'm Not Cool" + "Lip & Hip" by Hyuna	130	120	125	350	–	725
**Lachica**	"What Type of X" + "Nunu Nana" + "Gucci" by Jessi	101	110	103	400	+50	764
**HolyBang**	"What Type of X" + "Nunu Nana" + "Gucci" by Jessi	99	90	97	500	-50	736
**YGX**	"Eat You Up" + "Better" by BoA	151	120	125	550	-50	896
**Want**	"Eat You Up" + "Better" by BoA	49	80	75	600	–	804

As the losing crews, Want, WayB, HolyBang, and CocaNButter were chosen as candidates for elimination. CocaNButter was automatically placed in the elimination battle as a result of receiving the lowest score, and Want was excluded from selection as a result of receiving the highest score out of the 4 losing crews. The crew that ranked 1st, YGX, was given the power to choose their opponent out of the remaining losing crews. WayB was chosen as the second candidate for elimination.

Rules of the elimination battle
- Best of 5: The first round is a crew battle and rounds 2-5 are 1 VS 1
- In the 1 VS 1 rounds, each side dances for 40 seconds separately then 40 seconds together
- At the end of each round, the fight judges determine the winner
- The first crew to win three rounds is safe from elimination, while the losing crew is eliminated.

First elimination battle
Round	Contestant		Winning team
Round	CocaNButter	WayB	Winning team
1	Team	Team	CocaNButter
2	Gaga	Dolla	CocaNButter
3	Rihey	Noze	CocaNButter

=== Mission 4: "Mega Crew" ===
Crews will compete in a Mega Crew mission where each crew will create their own choreography and perform it with at minimum 25 performers including themselves. Crews must personally recruit their mega crew performers.

Final scores are calculated as the sum of the Fight Judges' Score + Global Popular Vote Score

Scoring system
- Fight Judges' Score: Each judge awards up to 100 points totaling up to 300 points.
- Global Popular Vote Score: Voting period from September 15, 2021, at 12:30 AM KST to September 17, 2021, at 12:00 PM KST. (Note: Videos were posted on YouTube by Mnet on September 15. Restricted to only Korea.) Score calculated as Views + Likes X 100. Crews are ranked from this score and awarded points starting at 700 points for the highest score.

"Mega Crew" mission
Crew	Crew size (Note: Including SWF)	Song selection	Scores				
Crew	Crew size	Song selection	BoA	Taeyong	Hwang Sang-hoon	Public vote	Total
Lachica	30 Dancers (Note: H_1 did not participate)	"Run the World (Girls) (Homecoming Live)" by Beyoncé	89	90	88	520	787
HolyBang	43 Dancers (Note: Belle did not participate and had to drop off the remainder of the show due to an ACL injury.)	"Energy" by Sampa the Great + "Freaks" by French Montana	93	90	98	700	981
CocaNButter	27 Dancers	"Chill TF Out" by GURF + "Deva" + "Shellz" by Ape Drums + "Go Down Deh" by Spice	91	95	95	550	831
Prowdmon	27 Dancers (Note: DIA did not participate)	"Desperado" by Dynamic Duo	92	95	98	640	925
Hook	27 Dancers (Note: Including Girls' Generation's Sooyoung)	"X Gon' Give It To Ya" by DMX + "Bring Em Out" by T.I. + "Torture" by Krump kings + "Outta Your Mind" by Lil Jon + "Dat $tick" by Rich Brian	90	93	99	670	952
YGX	25 Dancers	"Fire" by 2NE1 + "Bang Bang Bang" by Big Bang + "I Am the Best" by 2NE1	87	90	90	610	877
Want	29 Dancers (Note: Including Weki Meki's Choi Yoo-jung, Loona's Yves, and Lee Young-ji)	"Turn Up the Music" by Chris Brown	88	87	90	580	845

As the 7th place team, Lachica was automatically placed in the elimination battle. The crew that ranked 1st, HolyBang, was given the power to choose their opponent out of the remaining bottom 3 crews, WANT and CocaNButter. Want was chosen as the second candidate for elimination.

Rules of the elimination battle
- Best of 7: Round 1 is a team battle, round 4 is 2 VS 2, and rounds 2–3, 5-7 are 1 VS 1
- In the 1 VS 1 rounds, each side dances for 40 seconds separately then 40 seconds together
- At the end of each round, the fight judges determine the winner
- The first crew to win four rounds is safe from elimination, while the losing crew is eliminated.

Second elimination battle
Round	Contestant(s)		Winning team
Round	Lachica	Want	Winning team
1	Team	Team	Lachica
2	Peanut	Rozalin	Lachica
3	Gabee	Emma	Want
4	H_1, Simeez	Emma, Moana	Want
5	Rian	Moana	Lachica
6	Simeez	Hyojin Choi	Want
7	H_1	Lee Chaeyeon	Lachica

=== Mission 5: "Jessi Choreography Mission" ===
Each crew will create a new choreography for Jessi's new single "Cold Blooded". The crew whose choreography is chosen by Jessi and the crew whose choreography video (Note: Videos were posted on YouTube by Mnet on October 6. Voting period from October 6, 2021, at 1:00 PM KST to October 8, 2021, at 12:00 PM KST.) receives the most likes will receive 100 extra points.

"Jessi Choreography Mission"
Crew	Main Dancer	Scores	
Crew	Main Dancer	Jessi chosen choreography	Extra points for Most video likes
YGX	Yeojin	100	–
Hook	Aiki	–	100
CocaNButter	Z-Sun	–	–
Lachica	Gabee	–	–
HolyBang	Honey J	–	–
Prowdmon	Monika	–	–

=== Mission 6: "Men of Women" ===
Each crew will be joined by male dancers and must create and perform an original choreography.

Final scores are calculated as the sum of the Fight Judges' Score + Global Popular Vote Score + Jessi Choreography Mission Score from the previous mission.

Scoring system
- Fight Judges' Score: Each judge awards up to 100 points totaling up to 300 points.
- Global Popular Vote Score: Voting period from October 11, 2021, at 2:00 PM KST to October 14, 2021, at 12:00 AM KST. (Note: Videos were posted on YouTube by Mnet on October 11. Restricted to only Korea.) Score calculated as Views + Likes X 100. Crews are ranked from this score and awarded points starting at 700 points for the highest score.

"Men of Women" Mission
Crew	Male dancers	Song selection	Scores (Note: Some judge's scores for HolyBang, PROWDMON and YGX remain unrevealed)					
Crew	Male dancers	Song selection	BoA	Taeyong	Hwang Sang-hoon	Public vote	Jessi mission	Total
Lachica	Jo Kwon; Comingout	"Born This Way" by Lady Gaga	93	97	96	610	–	896
Hook	Da'Onez; WetBoy	"It's Raining Men" by The Weather Girls	95	95	96	670	100	1056
CocaNButter	Knucks; Door; Counter; Juice; IBan	"16 Shots" by Stefflon Don	96	98	98	640	–	932
HolyBang	Jay Park; Joony; WaSsup; Xion; Mr.Force	"Freezy" by Hucci	–	98	–	700	–	989
Prowdmon	Kyam	"Womanifesto" by Jill Scott	–	–	96	580	–	856
YGX	Kwon Twins; Jinwoo Yoon; Clown Maker; Hyunse Park	"Dance Now" by Sharaya J	–	–	94	550	100	924

As the lowest scoring crew, Prowdmon was automatically eliminated. YGX and Lachica will have an elimination battle for the last spot in the finals as the 4th and 5th place crews.

Rules of the elimination battle
- Best of 5: Round 1 is a team battle, round 4 is 2 VS 2, and rounds 2–3, 5 are 1 VS 1
- In the 1 VS 1 rounds, each side dances for 40 seconds separately then 40 seconds together
- At the end of each round, the fight judges determine the winner
- The first crew to win three rounds is safe from elimination, while the losing crew is eliminated.

Semi-final elimination battle
Round	Contestants		Winning team
Round	Lachica	YGX	Winning team
1	Team	Team	YGX
2	Rian	Yell	Lachica
3	Gabee	Leejung	YGX
4	Peanut, Simeez	Isak, Yell	Lachica
5	Peanut	Yeojin	Lachica

=== Mission 7: "Performance Sound Source" ===
Each crew will team up with an artist and create a performance to their song.

"Performance Sound Source" mission
Crew	Song selection
**Lachica**	"Bad Girl" by Chungha
**CocaNButter**	"Caviar" by CL
**HolyBang**	"No Break" by Simon Dominic, Loco
**Hook**	"Too young to die" by Sunmi

=== Mission 8: "Color of Crew" ===
Each crew will create a performance that shows the color representing them.

"Color of Crew" mission
Crew	Song selection
**Lachica**	"Bills, Bills, Bills" by Destiny's Child + "Conga" by Miami Sound Machine
**CocaNButter**	"Desperado (Inst.)" by Rihanna + "Ugly" by Bassnectar, Amp Live + "Make It Bun Dem" by Skrillex, Damian "Jr. Gong" Marley
**HolyBang**	"Venom" by Little Simz
**HOOK**	"Mother to Daughter" by Yang Hee-eun

== Final ranking ==
Final rankings
Rank	Crew	Notes
1st place, gold medalist(s)	HolyBang	Winner
2	Hook	Runner-up
3	Lachica	3rd place
4	Coca N'Butter	4th place
5	YGX	Eliminated in episode 8
6	Prowdmon	Eliminated in episode 8
7	Want	Eliminated in episode 6
8	WayB	Eliminated in episode 4

== Viewership ==
Street Woman Fighter : South Korea viewers per episode (thousands)

Season	Episode number								
Season	1	2	3	4	5	6	7	8	9
1	N/A	509	565	738	693	797	667	772	755

Source: Audience measurement performed nationwide by Nielsen Korea.

Average TV viewership ratings
Ep.	Original broadcast date	Average audience share (Nielsen Korea)	
Ep.	Original broadcast date	Nationwide	Seoul
1	August 24, 2021	1% (NR)	N/A
2	August 31, 2021	1.897% (3rd)	2.693% (2nd)
3	September 7, 2021	1.871% (3rd)	2.476% (3rd)
4	September 14, 2021	2.593% (3rd)	3.606% (3rd)
5	September 28, 2021	2.424% (3rd)	3.148% (3rd)
6	October 5, 2021	2.672% (3rd)	3.267% (3rd)
7	October 12, 2021	2.487% (3rd)	3.474% (3rd)
8	October 19, 2021	2.887% (3rd)	3.917% (2nd)
9	October 26, 2021	2.523% (3rd)	3.471% (2nd)
Average		2.544%	3.260% (Note: This average ratings is based on the published ratings, the exact average ratings is unknown due to one rating not published.)
Special 1	November 9, 2021	1.644% (5th)	1.887% (3rd)
Special 2	November 16, 2021	1.280% (6th)	1.432% (5th)
In the table above, the blue numbers represent the lowest ratings and the red numbers represent the highest ratings.; N/A denotes that the rating is not known.; NR denotes that the show did not rank in the top 10 daily programs.; This show aired on a cable channel/pay TV which normally has a relatively smaller audience compared to free-to-air TV/public broadcasters (KBS, SBS, MBC and EBS).

== Awards and nominations ==
Name of the award ceremony, year presented, category, recipient of the award and the result of the nomination
Award	Year	Category	Recipient	Result	Ref.
Baeksang Arts Awards	2022	Best Entertainment Program	Street Woman Fighter	Won	

== Spin-offs ==
=== Street Dance Girls Fighter ===
On November 2, 2021, Mnet dropped first teaser and confirmed that the spin-off titled Street Dance Girls Fighter where high school girls would compete to create a new dance crew was confirmed. It began airing on November 30, 2021, at 10.20pm KST, and concluded on January 4, 2022.

=== Be Mbitious and Be the SMF ===
On March 22, 2022, Mnet announced Be Mbitious which would consist of individual dancers who come together as one crew with the purpose of joining Street Man Fighter. The former show premiered on May 24, 2022. Be the SMF is a one-episode television special that preceded Street Man Fighter and aired on July 5, 2022. It announced the final eight members who will jointly make up the 'Mbitious' crew on SMF.

=== Anybody Can Dance ===
On March 23, 2022, Mnet confirmed the 8 team leaders of Street Woman Fighter will be returning with a brand new reality series. Where non-professionals with a passion for dance can apply to be a student on the program to be released on June 7, 2022.

=== Street Man Fighter ===
In the final episode of Street Dance Girls Fighter on January 4, 2022, Mnet released the first teaser to confirm season two of SWF, Street Man Fighter. The show is where male dance crews fight for the position of South Korea's best male dance crew to represent 'K-dance' to be released in August 2022.
