= Mnet (TV channel) =

South Korean television channel

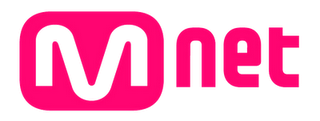
- Country: South Korea
- Headquarters: CJ ENM Center, Sangam-dong, Mapo District

Programming
- Picture format: 1080i HDTV

Ownership
- Owner: CJ ENM Entertainment Division (CJ Group)
- Sister channels: Mnet Japan; tvN (Korea); tvN DRAMA; tvN SHOW; tvN STORY; tvN SPORTS; tvN Asia; tvN Movies (Asia); OCN; OCN Movies 1; OCN Movies 2; CATCH ON 1; CATCH ON 2; Chunghwa TV; Tooniverse; Channel Wide; UXN (4K UHD)

History
- Founded: 1993; 33 years ago
- Launched: 1 March 1995; 31 years ago
- Former names: Music Network (1993–1995)

Links
- Website: Mnet Plus; TVING TV; Genie Music (affiliate)

Availability

Streaming media
- Mnet Plus: Watch Live (Selected shows only, including global simulcast of M Countdown)
- TVING: Watch Live (South Korea only)

Music Network (acronym of the Mnet) is a South Korean pay television music channel owned by CJ ENM Entertainment Division.

The CJ E&M Center Studio located in Sangam-dong, Mapo District, Seoul is the headquarters, broadcast and recording centre of many Mnet programs with a studio audience, namely the live weekly music show M Countdown. It is also the venue for live performances in survival shows such as Superstar K, Show Me The Money series, Produce 101 series, Comeback War series, Planet series and Street Dance series. Other shows are filmed in CJ E&M Studio in Ilsan and CJ E&M Contents World in Paju.

== History ==
The global website named for Mnet Global changed to MWave in April 2013. Other sites from Mnet are not affected with the change.

On 5 February 2020, it was revealed that CJ ENM had begun restructuring Mnet's "We Are K-Pop" slogan and brand after the controversy behind "Produce 101" damaged the network's image.

On 24 February 2020, Mnet unveiled their new brand logo along with its 25th anniversary., Their new logo design is based on their old logo from 1995 with the addition of their current Mnet shape and colour. M2, Mwave, and the Mnet Production logo have stuck to the former design.

On 21 May 2020, Mnet reverted its logo back to its former design with social distancing animations.

== Slogans ==
Year	Slogan	Hangul
1995–1999	South Korea music channel m.net	한국의 음악채널 m.net
2000–2001	Channel in my mind m.net	내 마음속의 채널 m.net
2001–2003	Korean music channel m.net	한국인의 음악채널 m.net
2003–2004, 2007–2008	Enjoy It! m.net	즐겨봐! m.net
January 2005 – July 2005	m.net 10th anniversary, full m.net!	m.net 10년, 완전엠넷!
July 2005 – 2007	Hello, my name is Mnet!	
2008–2010	Beyond music	
2010–2011	All about 20's	
2011–present	Music makes one (main slogan)	
April 2013 – January 2014	Jump! Mnet	juMp! 엠넷
January 2014 – December 2016	KPop makes one	
January 2017 – January 2019	Move me, move the world, moveMnet	나를 움직이다 세상을 움직이다 moveMnet!
June 2018 – January 2019 (Europe)	Mnet makes new K-pop star & trends	
January 2019 – January 2020 (North America)	We Are K-POP	
January 2020 – June 2020	Music Network, M.net!	
May 2020 – June 2020	#good_distance	#착한_거리두기
August 2020 – October 2020	#healthy_distance	#건강한_거리두기
April 2020	#Save_our_planet	
August 2020 – September 2020	Summer Break with Mnet	
May 2020 – March 2025	Global Music Network, Mnet	
March 2025 – Present	K-POP GENERATION	

== Mnet Digital Studio ==
Mnet Digital Studio launched Studio Choom (stylized in all caps) in May 2019, a YouTube channel which features notable K-pop acts performing dances in front of the studio's white background and colored lights. The sets often feature backup dancers and usually lack any background props.

== Programming ==
=== Current programming ===
==== Variety shows ====
- Mnet Prime Show ( – present)
- HIT village ( – present)
- My Arti Film (2024–present)

==== Music programming ====
- M Countdown
- Daily Music Talk
- M Evening
- M Morning
- Live on M
- MUSICEXPRESS
- MUSIC X CURATION
- MPD MUSIC TALK
- MPD Music Video Commentary
- M2 Today's Song Weekly Chart
- Mnet Present
- M Super Concert

==== Awards ceremony ====
- MAMA Awards (1999–present)

Special events

- Billboard Music Award (2018–present)
- Gaon Chart Music Awards (2017–present)
- Grammy Award (2018–present)

=== Former programming ===
==== Awards ceremony ====
- Mnet 20's Choice Awards (2007–2013)
- M2 X Genie Music Awards (2019)

Special events

- Asia Song Festival (2016–2018)
- American Music Award (2017)
- idolCON (2017, ~~2018~~)
- Style Icon Asia (2008–2014, 2016)

==== Dramas ====
- Monstar (2013)
- Mimi (2014)
- Entertain Us (2014)
- Sing Again, Hera Gu (2015)
- The Lover (2015)

==== Variety shows and specials ====
- M terview
- Be Stupid
- Dirty Talk
- Fun & Joy
- Love & Hate
- MLive
- Mnet Special
- Mnet Star
- M WIDE ENEWS
- Music Spotlight
- Spring, Summer, Fall, Winter Forest
- Boys & Girls Music Countdown (2007–2010)
- Girls' Generation Goes to School (2007)
- Hot Blooded Men (2008)
- Girls' Generation's Factory Girl (2008)
- Wonder Bakery (2008)
- Kara Bakery (2009)
- BIGBANG TV (2009)
- 2NE1 TV (2009–2011)
- Wild Bunny (2009)
- Nicole The Entertainer's Introduction to Veterinary Science (2009–2010)
- Superstar K (co-produced by Signal Entertainment Group; simulcast on tvN) (2009–2016)
- T-ara's Dream Girls (2010–2011)
- Beatles Code (2010, 2013)
- M! Pick (2011)
- Real Homme (2011)
- K-Pop Star Hunt (2011–2014)
- MyDOL (2012) (co-produced by Jellyfish Entertainment)
- Boyfriend's W Academy (2012)
- The God of music (2012, 2016)
- JJANG! (2012–2013)
- The Voice of Korea (simulcast on tvN) (2012–2013, 2020)
- M Countdown Begins (Formerly RT M Countdown) (2012–2015)
- M-GIGS (2012–2016)
- Show Me the Money (2012–2022, 2026)
- BLACK CAST (2013)
- The Voice Kids (2013)
- Signal B (2013)
- Image Fighter 2013 (2013)
- Superhit (2013)
- Enemy of Broadcasting (2013)
- WINNER TV (2013)
- YG's Win: Who Is Next (2013) (co-produced by YG Entertainment)
- Dancing 9 (2013–2014)
- Rain Effect (2013–2014)
- tune up with Mnet (2013–2014)
- Idol Battle (2014)
- Beatles Code 3D (2014)
- American Hustle Life (2014)
- Moon Hee-joon's Pure 15 (2014)
- Mix & Match (2014) (co-produced by YG Entertainment)
- Block B's Live! 5 Minutes Before Chaos (2014)
- Exo 90:2014 (2014)
- XOXO Exo (2014)
- Superstar K 6 all-star concert (2014)
- This Is Infinite (2014)
- Trot X (2014)
- Foul Interview 4 Things Show (2014–2015)
- The Singer Game (2014)
- 100 Seconds War (2014)
- Idol Make-up Recipe (2014)
- Kim Bum Soo Comeback Show (2014)
- No.Mercy (2014–2015)
- MAMA Hidden Story (2014)
- Super Idol Chart Show (2014–2015)
- Superstar K6 B-SIDE (2014–2015)
- Hologram (2015)
- Heart a Tag (2015)
- Headliner (2015)
- Monthly Live Connection (2015)
- One Night Study (2015) (co-produced by FNC Entertainment)
- Sixteen (2015) (co-produced by JYP Entertainment and Koen Media)
- Ya-man TV (2015)
- Key's Know How (co-produced by SM Entertainment) (2015)
- Superstar K BEFORE & AFTER (2015)
- Unpretty Rapstar (2015–2016)
- Produce 101 (2016–2017)
- Boys24 (2016) (co-produced by Live Works Company and N2 Studios, simulcast on tvN)
- d.o.b : Dance or Band (2016) (co-produced by FNC Entertainment)
- Finding Momo Land (co-produced by Duble Kick Entertainment and twin7 Entertainment)
- I.O.I Comeback Countdown (2016)
- Lady bees (2016) (co-produced by Zhejiang TV, For Zhejiang TV)
- LAN Cable Friends I.O.I (2016)
- MIXTAPE (2016)
- Monsta X's Right Now! (2016)
- Me&7Men (co-produced by Plan A Entertainment and CK1 Media) (2016)
- PAN STEALER (2016)
- Pentagon Maker (2016) (co-produced by Cube Entertainment)
- Really Really Really Miss You Show (2016)
- Sing Street (2016)
- Standby I.O.I (2016)
- Twice's Private Life (2016)
- We Kid (simulcast on tvN) (2016)
- Would You Like Girls: My Cosmic Diary (2016) (co-produced by Starship Entertainment and Urban Works Media)
- Hit the Stage (simulcast on tvN) (2016)
- New YANG NAM SHOW (rename form YANG and NAM SHOW) (2016–2017)
- Golden Tambourine (2016–2017)
- High School Rapper (2017–2021)
- Wiki BOYS24 (co-produced by Live Works Company and N2 Studios) (2017)
- BOYS24 SEMI FINAL (co-produced by Live Works Company and N2 Studios) (2017)
- A-IF-Ril (co-produced by DSP Media) (2017)
- Dodaeng's Diary in LA (co-produced by Fantagio) (2017)
- Woollim Pick 2017 (co-produced by Woollim Entertainment) (2017)
- Wanna One Premier Show Con (2017)
- SNOWBALL PROJECT (co-produced by S.M. Entertainment and Mystic Entertainment) (2017)
- Comeback Show – BTS DNA (co-produced by Big Hit Entertainment) (2017)
- BTS Countdown (co-produced by Big Hit Entertainment) (2017)
- Idol School (co-produced Take One Studio) (2017)
- My Love My Friend (2017)
- JustBeJoyful JBJ (co-produced by LOEN Entertainment) (2017)
- Project S : Devil's Talent Donation (2017)
- fromis_'s room (2017)
- Stray Kids (co-produced by JYP Entertainment) (2017)
- Wanna One Go (co-produced by YMC Entertainment) (2017)
- Wanna One Nothing Without You Comeback (co-produced by YMC Entertainment) (2017)
- Wanna One Go Zero Base (co-produced by YMC Entertainment) (2017)
- The Master (2017–2018)
- Wanna One Comeback "I Promise You" (co-produced by YMC Entertainment) (2018)
- Heize COMEBACK SHOW (2018)
- idolity (2018)
- COMEBACK SOLID Into the Light (2018)
- BTS Comeback Show – Highlight Reel (co-produced by Big Hit Entertainment)
- BREAKERS (2018)
- Finding Hero: Geek Tour (2018)
- SVT Club (co-produced by Pledis Entertainment) (2018)
- Wanna One Go X-CON! (co-produced by Swing Entertainment) (2018)
- The Call (2018–2019)
- SHINee's BACK (co-produced by SM Entertainment) (2018)
- Produce 48 (co-produced by AKS) (2018)
- LIVE QUIZ ON (2018)
- RunBTS (co-produced by Big Hit Entertainment) (2018)
- Code Name is ATEEZ (co-produced by KQ Entertainment) (2018)
- Got7 Comeback Show – Present: YOU (co-produced by JYP Entertainment) (2018)
- A Battle of One Voice: 300 (Rerun from tvN) (2018)
- GOT YA! GWSN (co-produced by Kiwi Media Group) (2018)
- Bultoen Honkono (불토엔 혼코노) (2018)
- IZ*ONE 'COLOR*IZ' SHOW–CON (co-produced by Off the Record Entertainment) (2018)
- Tutor (2018)
- Got7's Hard Carry 2 (co-produced by JYP Entertainment) (2018)
- The Kkondae Live (2018)
- NOW VERIVERY (co-produced by Jellyfish Entertainment) (2018)
- NU'EST Road (co-produced by Pledis Entertainment) (2018)
- Wanna One Comeback Show "Power of Destiny (co-produced by Swing Entertainment) (2018)
- Somebody (2018–2019)
- Love Catcher (2018–2019, 2021–2022)
- ATEEZ: TREASURE FILM (co-produced by KQ Entertainment) (2019)
- Premier Showcase VERIVERY (co-produced by Jellyfish Entertainment) (2019)
- TOMORROW X TOGETHER DEBUT CELEBRATION SHOW (co-produced by Big Hit Entertainment) (2019)
- SUPER INTERN (co-produced by JYP Entertainment) (2019)
- UHSN (2019)
- Produce X 101 (2019)
- ONE DREAM.TXT (co-produced by Big Hit Entertainment) (2019)
- FLEX ZONE (2019)
- X1 PREMIER SHOW-CON (co-produced by Swing Entertainment) (2019)
- X1 FLASH (2019)
- Premier Show Con Pentagon (co-produced by Cube Entertainment) (2019)
- IZ*ONE Style Vlog in LA (co-produced by Off The Record Entertainment) (2019)
- Not the Same Person You Used to Know (2019)
- OnlyOneOf: Unlocking Love (co-produced by 8D Creative) (2019)
- Got7's Hard Carry 2.5 (co-produced by JYP Entertainment) (2019)
- EVERGLOW LAND (co-produced by Yuehua Entertainment) (2019)
- naturereality (co-produced by n.CH Music Entertainment) (2019)
- World Klass (co-produced by Stone Music Entertainment) (2019)
- Queendom (2019, 2022)
- TMI Show (2019–2022)
- Paris et ITZY (co-produced by JYP Entertainment) (2020)
- COMEBACK IZ*ONE BLOOM*IZ (co-produced by Off The Record Entertainment) (2020)
- Kang Daniel Comeback Show CYAN (co-produced by Konnect Entertainment) (2020)
- TOO DEBUT SHOW TOO DAY (co-produced by Stone Music Entertainment)(2020)
- Wanna Be Singers (2020)
- Do You Know Hiphop? (2020)
- Gang Student (GANG생) (2020)
- NU'EST Come Back Show : The Nocturne (co-produced by Pledis Entertainment) (2020)
- TOMORROW X TOGETHER Comeback Show (co-produced by Big Hit Entertainment) (2020)
- Song FARM! (곡FARM!) (2020)
- Taeyeon Beauty-Log (2020)
- Studio Music Hall (스튜디오 음악당) (2020)
- Quiz Music Show (2020)
- IZ*ONE COMEBACK SHOW ONEIRIC DIARY (co-produced by Swing Entertainment) (2020)
- Road to Kingdom (2020)
- SEVENTEEN COMEBACK SHOW: [Heng:garae] (co-produced by Pledis Entertainment) (2020)
- AB6IX COMEBACK SHOW VIVID (co-produced by Brand New Music) (2020)
- TOO MYSTERY (co-produced by Stone Music Entertainment)(2020)
- Finding Stray Kids (co-produced by JYP Entertainment) (2020)
- GOOD GIRL (2020)
- I-LAND (co-produced by Belift Lab) (2020)
- BTS Special: Dynamite (co-produced by Big Hit Entertainment) (2020)
- IZ*ONE CHU ON:TACT (co-produced by Swing Entertainment) (2020)
- GHOST9 DEBUT SHOWCASE [DOOR] (co-produced by Maroo Entertainment) (2020)
- TOMORROW X TOGETHER Comeback Show: Blue Hour (co-produced by Big Hit Entertainment) (2020)
- MAMAMOO COMEBACK SHOW <MONOLOGUE> (co-produced by RBW) (2020)
- ENHYPEN DEBUT SHOW : DAY ONE (co-produced by Belift Lab) (2020)
- NCT World 2.0 (co-produced by SM Entertainment) (2020)
- IZ*ONE One-reeler Premier (co-produced by Swing Entertainment) (2020)
- GHOST9 COMEBACK SHOWCASE [W.ALL] In Busan (co-produced by Maroo Entertainment) (2020)
- VICTON COMEBACK SHOW (co-produced by IST Entertainment) (2020)
- ITZY In Korea (2020)
- BooKae Contest (2020)
- Running Girls (2020)
- CAP-TEEN (2020–2021)
- Folk Us (2020–2021)
- One More Time (2021)
- Full Sound (배부른 소리) (2021)
- Salary Lupin ATEEZ (2021)
- SUPER JUNIOR COMEBACK SHOW : House Party (co-produced by SM Entertainment) (2021)
- ENHYPEN&Hi S2 (co-produced by Belift Lab) (2021)
- ENHYPEN COMEBACK SHOW 'CARNIVAL' (co-produced by Belift Lab) (2021)
- Kingdom: Legendary War (2021)
- Welcome 2 House: TO1 X EPEX (co-produced by Stone Music Entertainment and C9 Entertainment) (2021)
- The CIX Million Dollar Kids (co-produced by C9 Entertainment) (2021)
- 2PM Comeback Show 'Must' (2021)
- 2PM WILDSIX (co-produced by JYP Entertainment) (2021)
- Kingdom Week : <NO+> (2021)
- ENHYPEN COMEBACK SHOW 'DILEMMA' (co-produced by Belift Lab) (2021)
- E'last Superhero (2021)
- Girls Planet 999 (co-produced by NCSoft) (2021)
- Street Woman Fighter (2021)
- The Playlist (2021)
- MAMA : The Original KPOP Awards (2021)
- Kep1er View (co-produced by Swing Entertainment and Wake One Entertainment) (2021)
- Kep1er Debut Show (co-produced by Swing Entertainment and Wake One Entertainment) (2022)
- Street Dance Girls Fighter (2021–2022)
- My K Star Family (co-produced by MBC and Discovery Channel Korea) (2021–2022)
- White Dream: DRIPPIN's Extraordinary Ski Camp (Co-produced by Woollim Entertainment) (2022)
- Back when Gen Z (Zㅏ때는 말이야) (2022)
- My Boyfriend Is Better (2022)
- ITZY Cozy House (co-produced by JYP Entertainment) (2022)
- Be Mbitious (2022)
- Anybody Can Dance (2022)
- WJSN COMEBACK SHOW: SEQUENCE (co-produced by Starship Entertainment) (2022)
- Be the SMF (2022)
- Great Seoul Invasion (co-produced by MPMG Music) (2022)
- LE SSERAFIM Comeback Show: ANTIFRAGILE (co-produced by Source Music) (2022)
- LA@ITZY (co-produced by JYP Entertainment) (2022)
- Finding SKZ Get edition (co-produced by JYP Entertainment) (2022)
- Street Man Fighter (2022)
- KPOP Maker (2022)
- Artistock Game (2022)
- Mad Zenius (2022)
- LE SSERAFIM Documentary :The World Is My Oyster (co-produced Source Music) (2022)
- LENIVERSE (co-produced Source Music) (2022)
- 1,2,3 IVE (co-produced Starship Entertainment) (2022)
- 2022 Music Makes One (2022)
- KEPtain Heroes (co-produced Swing Entertainment) (2022)
- Mbitious Man in The Crew (2022)
- The K-Star Next Door (2022)
- Born To Choom (2022–2023)
- Up TO1 (co-produced Wake One Entertainment) (2023)
- Boys Planet (2023)
- Pangpang STAYC (co-produce High Up Entertainment) (2023)
- Queendom Puzzle (2023)
- Street Woman Fighter 2 (2023)
- Street Dance Girls Fighter 2 (2023)
- Kep1er Unner (co-produced by Swing Entertainment and Wake One Entertainment) (2023)
- Camp Zerobaseone (co-produced by Wake One Entertainment) (2023)
- I Can See Your Voice 10 (2023)
- Girls Night Out (2023)
- Build Up: Vocal Boy Group Survival (2024)
- I-Land 2: N/a (2024)
- Road to Kingdom: Ace of Ace (2024)
- Stage Fighter (2024)
- Boys II Planet (2025)

== Controversies ==
=== Remix of Islamic call to prayer ===
On 24 August 2021, Mnet's new dance survival show Street Woman Fighter premiered. The opening music was a remix of the Adhan, the Islamic call to prayer, and many found this offensive. On 9 September, the Street Woman Fighter production team apologized and said they would re-upload the video with replacement music. They promised to be more careful and continue to listen to viewers' opinions in the future.

== Logo ==
The first logo used since its rebranding from Music Network to m.net, later briefly revived for its 25th anniversary (1 March 1995 – 20 July 2005; February–May 2020)

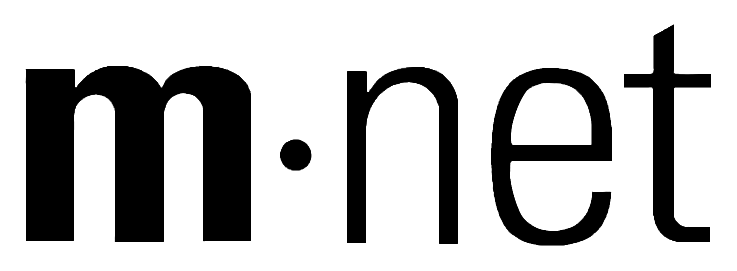
A variant of the first logo, without colour or the quaver (2000 – July 2005)

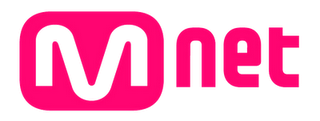
The second and current logo (21 July 2005–present)

== See also ==
- MBC M
- SBS M
