= Roh Tae-hyun =

South Korean singer (born 1993)

Roh Tae-hyun 노태현
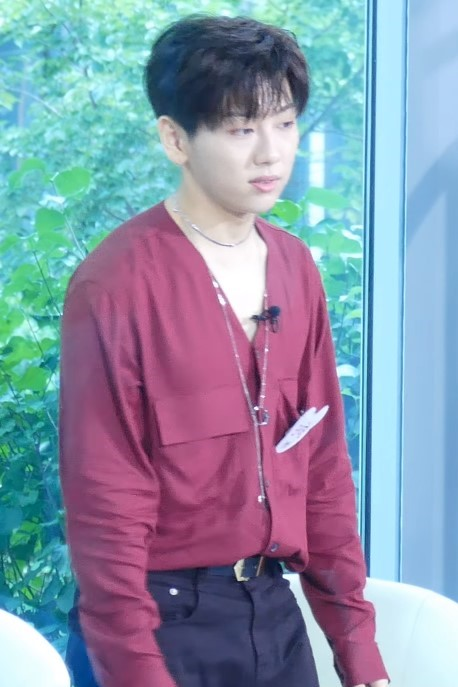
- Roh in 2017

Background information
- Also known as: Kid Monster
- Born: October 15, 1993 (age 32); Seoul, South Korea
- Genres: Dance; krump
- Occupations: singer; dancer; musical actor
- Instrument: Vocals
- Years active: 2014–present
- Labels: Star Crew; WakeOne
- Member of: Mbitious
- Formerly of: JBJ; Hotshot

Korean name
- Hangul: 노태현
- Hanja: 盧太鉉
- RR: No Taehyeon
- MR: No T'aehyŏn

Roh Tae-hyun (Korean: 노태현; born October 15, 1993), is a South Korean singer and dancer. He is a former member of Hotshot and JBJ. He released his debut solo extended play, Birthday, on January 24, 2019. He participated as a member of Mbitious in Street Man Fighter.

== Discography ==
=== Extended plays ===
Title	Album details	Peak chart positions	Sales
Title	Album details	KOR	Sales
Birthday	Released: January 24, 2019; Label: Star Crew Entertainment, Interpark; Formats: CD, digital download; Track listing: 1. biRTHday; 2. I Wanna Know; 3. Love Lock; 4. 하늘별	9	KOR: 12,252

=== Singles ===
==== As lead artist ====
Title	Year	Peak chart positions	Album
Title	Year	KOR	Album
"I Wanna Know"	2019	—	Birthday
"Dummy Dummy" (feat Takeda Kenta, Kim Sang-gyun, Kwon Hyun-bin, Kim Dong-han)	2025	—	Non-album single
"—" denotes releases that did not chart.

==== Soundtrack appearances ====
Title	Year	Peak chart positions	Album
Title	Year	KOR	Album
"Highlight"	2019	—	Catch the Ghost OST Part.3
"Blue Eyes"	2021	—	Summer Guys OST Part.1
"—" denotes releases that did not chart.

== Filmography ==
=== Television shows ===
Year	Title	Role	Ref.
2017	Produce 101 (season 2)	Contestant	
2019	All About K-POP Idols! Fact In Star	assistant MC / idol of the month	
2019	World Klass (Ep. 7)	Special Judge	
2022	I Live Alone (Ep. 433)	Special Appearance	
2022	Be Mbitious	Contestant	
2022	Street Man Fighter	Contestant	
2023	Girls Night Out	Guest with Shin Ocheon	

=== Musical theatre ===
Year	Title	Role	Ref.
2019	Mephisto	Mephisto	
2020	Iron Mask	Louis and Philippe	
2021	창업	Lee Bangwon	
2022	Klimt: in to the time of Seoul	Egon Schiele	

=== Theatre ===
Year	Title	Role	Ref.
2022	B Class	Lee Suhyeon	
