= Hotshot (band) =

South Korean boy group

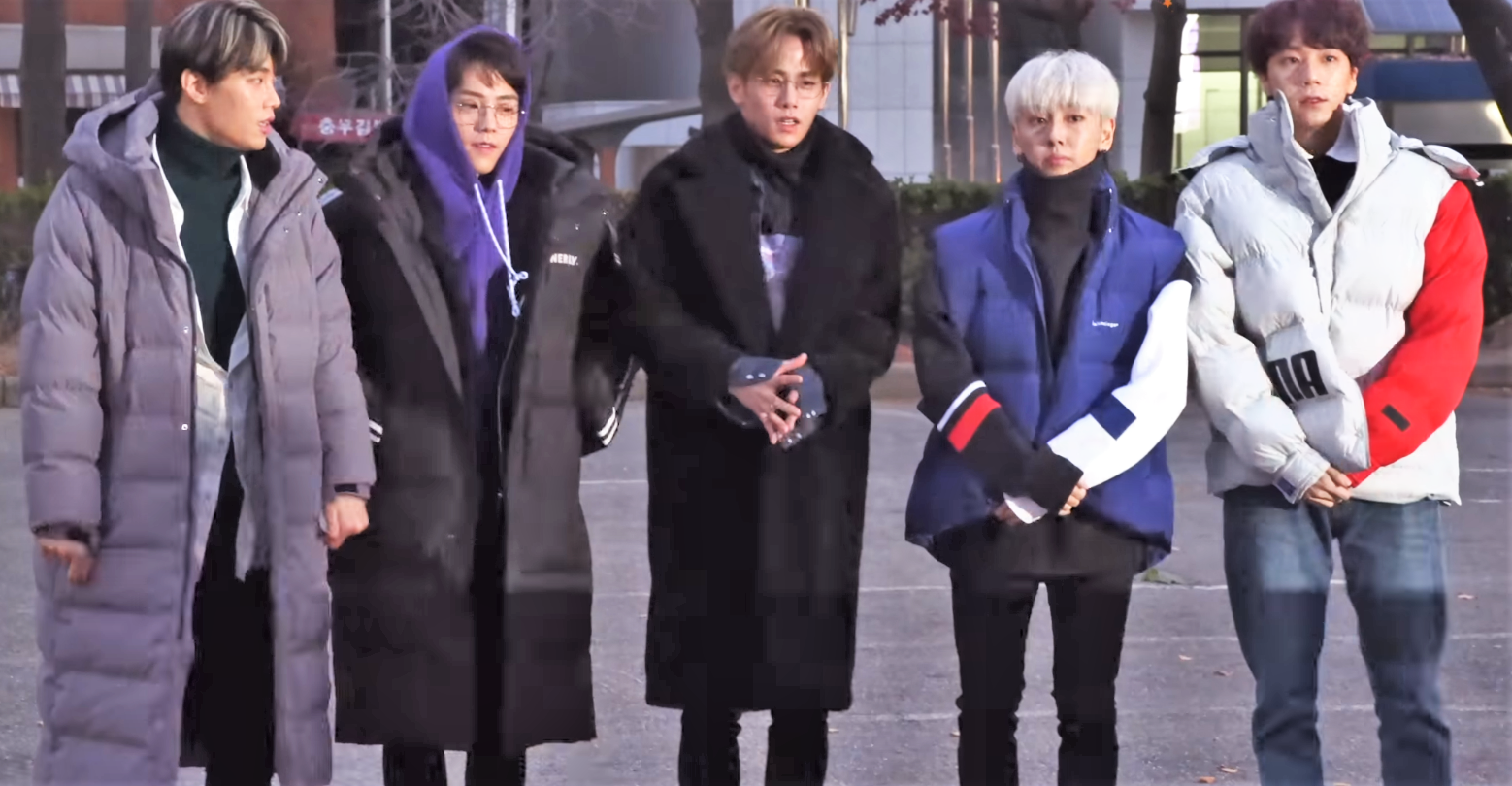
- Hotshot in November 2018

Background information
- Origin: Seoul, South Korea
- Genres: K-pop
- Years active: 2014–2021
- Labels: Star Crew
- Past members: Choi Jun-hyuk; Kim Timoteo; Roh Tae-hyun; Ha Sung-woon; Yoonsan; Ko Ho-jung

Hotshot (Korean: 핫샷; stylized as HOTSHOT) was a South Korean boy band formed in 2014 by Star Crew Entertainment (formerly K.O Sound and Ardor & Able), consisted of six-members: Choi Jun-hyuk, Kim Timoteo, Roh Tae-hyun, Ha Sung-woon, Yoonsan and Ko Ho-jung. During the group's career, they released two EPs, one re-issue EPs and three single. The group release their second EP in November 2018 and went to hiatus since then prior announced the disbandment in March 2021.

== History ==
=== Pre-debut ===
Timoteo was formerly an SM Entertainment trainee and was supposed to be a member of Exo. Taehyun was exposed to the krump dancing style as Kid Monster, active as a member of a dance group named Monster Woo Fam from 2007–2008. Yoonsan had been living in France for eight years, and was scouted while drinking coffee during his vacation in South Korea.

=== 2014–2016: Debut ===
Hotshot released their debut single, "Take a Shot", on October 29, 2014.

On December 6, it was reported that Hotshot were involved in a light car accident after MBC's Show! Music Core, resulting in minor injuries.

Hotshot released their second digital single, "Midnight Sun" on March 25, 2015, followed by their first extended play, Am I Hotshot?, released on April 24, 2015. The EP consisted of five tracks with "Watch Out", as well as their previous singles "Take a Shot" and "Midnight Sun".

On July 2, a repackaged edition of Am I Hotshot?, titled I'm A Hotshot, was released containing the original tracks from Am I Hotshot? along with two new songs, including the single "I'm A Hotshot".

On June 8, 2016, Hotshot released their debut Japanese single "Step by Step", with the lead song of the same name, "One More Try" and the instrumental version of "Step by Step".

=== 2017–2021: Project group, Early Flowering and disbandment ===
Taehyun and Sungwoon participated in the survival television series Produce 101 Season 2 during the first half of 2017. The series concluded with one of the two competing members, Sungwoon, ranking 11th and becoming a member of the temporary boy group Wanna One. Taehyun was eliminated, ranking 25th overall. Due to the nature of the contract between Wanna One members and CJ E&M, Sungwoon would promote as a member of Wanna One until December 2018, after which he will return to promote as a regular member of Hotshot again.

The remaining five members released a digital single titled "Jelly" on July 15, 2017. Star Crew Entertainment confirmed that Taehyun would be joining the Produce 101 Season 2 fan-created group JBJ and would promote for seven months under Fave Entertainment. JBJ debuted on October 18, 2017 and disbanded on April 30, 2018.

From October 2017 to February 2018, Timoteo and Hojung participated in the reality television series The Unit. When the show ended, Hojung ranked 3rd, putting him in the top nine and the line-up of project boy group UNB. Timoteo finished 10th. Hojung would promote as a member of UNB for seven months and will be extended up to twenty-five months if the group gained successful, also allowed the project group members to do activities under their respective companies while UNB was on break.

On November 15, 2018, Hotshot released their second EP Early Flowering with the lead single "I Hate You".

On March 30, 2021, Star Crew Entertainment announced that Hotshot disbanded after completing all activities as a group.

== Members ==
- Choi Jun-hyuk (최준혁)
- Kim Timoteo (김티모테오)
- Roh Tae-hyun (노태현)
- Ha Sung-woon (하성운)
- Yoonsan (윤산)
- Ko Ho-jung (고호정)

== Discography ==
=== Extended plays ===
| Title | Album details | Peak chart positions | Sales |
| Title | Album details | KOR | Sales |
|---|---|---|---|
| Am I Hotshot? | Released: April 24, 2015; Label: K.O Sound; Formats: CD, digital download; Track listing: 1. Midnight Sun; 2. Watch Out; 3. Rain On Me; 4. Take a Shot; 5. Watch Out (Inst.) | 11 | KOR: 2,547 |
| Am I Hotshot? | Re-released: July 2, 2015 (I'm a Hotshot); Label: K.O Sound; Formats: CD, digital download; Track listing: 1. Midnight Sun; 2. I'm a Hotshot; 3. Watch Out; 4. Rain On Me; 5. Take a Shot; 6. Watch Out (Inst.); 7. I'm a Hotshot (Inst.) | 13 | KOR: 1,647 |
| Early Flowering | Released: November 15, 2018; Label: Star Crew; Formats: CD, digital download; Track listing: 1. Print; 2. I Hate You (니가 미워); 3. Paradise; 4. Better; 5. Body Talks | 10 | KOR: 16,845 |
"—" denotes releases that did not chart.

=== Singles ===
| Title | Year | Peak chart positions | | Sales | Album |
| Title | Year | KOR | JPN | Sales | Album |
Korean
| "Take a Shot" | 2014 | — | — | —N/a | Am I Hotshot? |
| "Midnight Sun" | 2015 | — | — | —N/a | Am I Hotshot? |
| "Watch Out" | 2015 | — | — | —N/a | Am I Hotshot? |
| "I'm a Hotshot" | 2015 | — | — | —N/a | I'm a Hotshot |
| "Jelly" | 2017 | — | — | —N/a | Non-album single |
| "I Hate You" (니가 미워) | 2018 | — | — | —N/a | Early Flowering |
Japanese
| "Step by Step" | 2016 | — | 35 | —N/a | Step by Step |
"—" denotes releases that did not chart.
