= YGX (group) =

South Korean dance academy

- YGX logo
- Native name: 와이지엑스
- Company type: Subsidiary
- Industry: dance
- Genre: Hip hop
- Founded: May 2018; 7 years ago
- Founder: Yang Hyun-suk
- Defunct: April 30, 2024
- Fate: Ceased Operations
- Parent: YG Entertainment

YGX was a South Korean hip hop dance academy under YG Entertainment. YGX Entertainment was a sub-label that focused on production and artist management, and X ACADEMY, a dance and vocal academy.

== History ==
Yang Hyun-suk announced, in May 2018, a subsidiary company called YGX would merge with Seungri's DJ label NHR. On June 4, on his official Instagram account, he posted a picture of a business card showing Seungri as the CEO of YGX Entertainment. In 2018, the label launched a dance and vocal academy, called X ACADEMY, where students could potentially be scouted by YG Entertainment as trainees.

In 2020, the label was converted to a full-fledged dance group and academy with all of its actors, recording artists, and producers transferred to YG Entertainment.

The YGX academy announced its end of operations on 30 April 2024.

== Exclusive dance teams ==
Crazy

- RarmG
- Ryeon
- Gahee
- Silvergun
- Bini
- Sseon
- Dany
- Isak
- Maina
- Dayoung

Hitech

- JP
- YSL
- BK
- Deukie
- Dony
- Onestar
- Roki
- Dow
- Heeeeyun

NWX

- Babyzoo
- Leejung Lee
- Yeojin
- Jihyo
- Sonya Choi
- Junho Lee
- Dart
- Mood Dok
- Taryn
- Junsun Woo

GIRLISH

- Redlic
- Roshe Han

== X ACADEMY ==
=== Dance choreographers ===
- Lee Jae-wook (director & main choreographer)
- Kim Hee-jung (main choreographer)
- Leejung Lee (choreographer)

== Former artists ==
=== Former actors ===
- Kwon Hyun-bin (Viini) (Note: transferred to YG Entertainment.)
- Lee Soo-hyuk
- Joo Woo-jae
- Kwon Han-sol
- Jung Yoon-seok
- Park Tae-in
- Han Seung-yeon
- Woo Kang-min

=== Former recording artists ===
- Zayvo (2019–2020)
- Blue.D (2019–2020)
- Anda (2018–2021)
- Viini (2019–2024)

=== Former producers ===
- Choice37
- Hae
- Se.A
- 1105
- Lil G
- Sonny

=== Former vocal instructors ===
- iHwak
- Youn Young-sam
- Sung Su-jin
- Kim Yeon-seo
- Lee Kwan-je
- Youn Nam-ju
- Park Jeon-koo

== Discography ==
Year	Released	Title	Artist	Type
2019	March 6	What You Waiting For	R.Tee x Anda	Single
2019	August 19	Dimension	Viini	Extended play
2019	September 17	Collection	Zayvo	Extended play
2019	December 2	Nobody	Blue.D	Single
2020	March 4	Moon & Butterfly	Viini	Single
