= List of Show! Music Core Chart winners (2021) =

Winners of South Korean music program Show! Music Core

Show! Music Core Chart winners (2021)

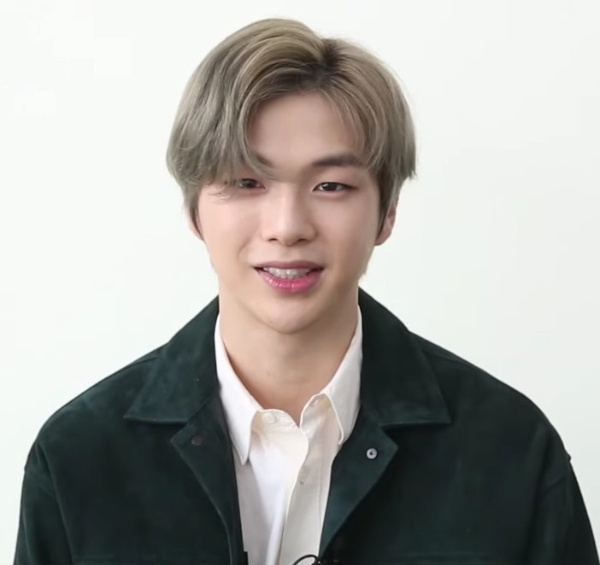
"Antidote" by Kang Daniel was the highest-scoring song on Show! Music Core for 2021.

The Show! Music Core Chart is a record chart on the South Korean MBC television music program Show! Music Core. Every week, the show awards the best-performing single on the chart in the country during its live broadcast.

In 2021, 27 singles have ranked at number one on the chart and 19 music acts received first-place trophies. No release for the year achieved a perfect score, but "Antidote" by Kang Daniel, which attained the highest point total on the April 24 broadcast with 10,702 points. "Butter" by BTS and "Strawberry Moon" by IU were number 1 for 5 consecutive weeks, both earning a Quintuple Crown. The artist with the most number of wins was also IU with 10 total wins.

== Scoring system ==
Period covered	Chart system				
Period covered	Broadcast	Digital sales	Physical album	Video views	Voting
September 26, 2020 – February 20, 2021	5% (MBC radio)	60% (50% gaon + 10% FLO*)	10%	10%	35% (10% committee + 10% pre-vote* + 15% live-vote)
February 27, 2021 – May 8, 2021	10% (MBC TV + Radio)	60% (50% gaon + 10% FLO*)	10%	15%	25% (5% committee + 10% pre-vote + 10% live-vote)
May 8, 2021 - May 29, 2021	10% (MBC TV + Radio)	50%	10%	15%	25% (5% committee + 10% pre-vote + 10% live-vote)
June 5, 2021 – present	10% (MBC TV + Radio)	50%	10%	10%	20% (5% committee + 5% pre-vote + 10% live-vote)

== Chart history ==
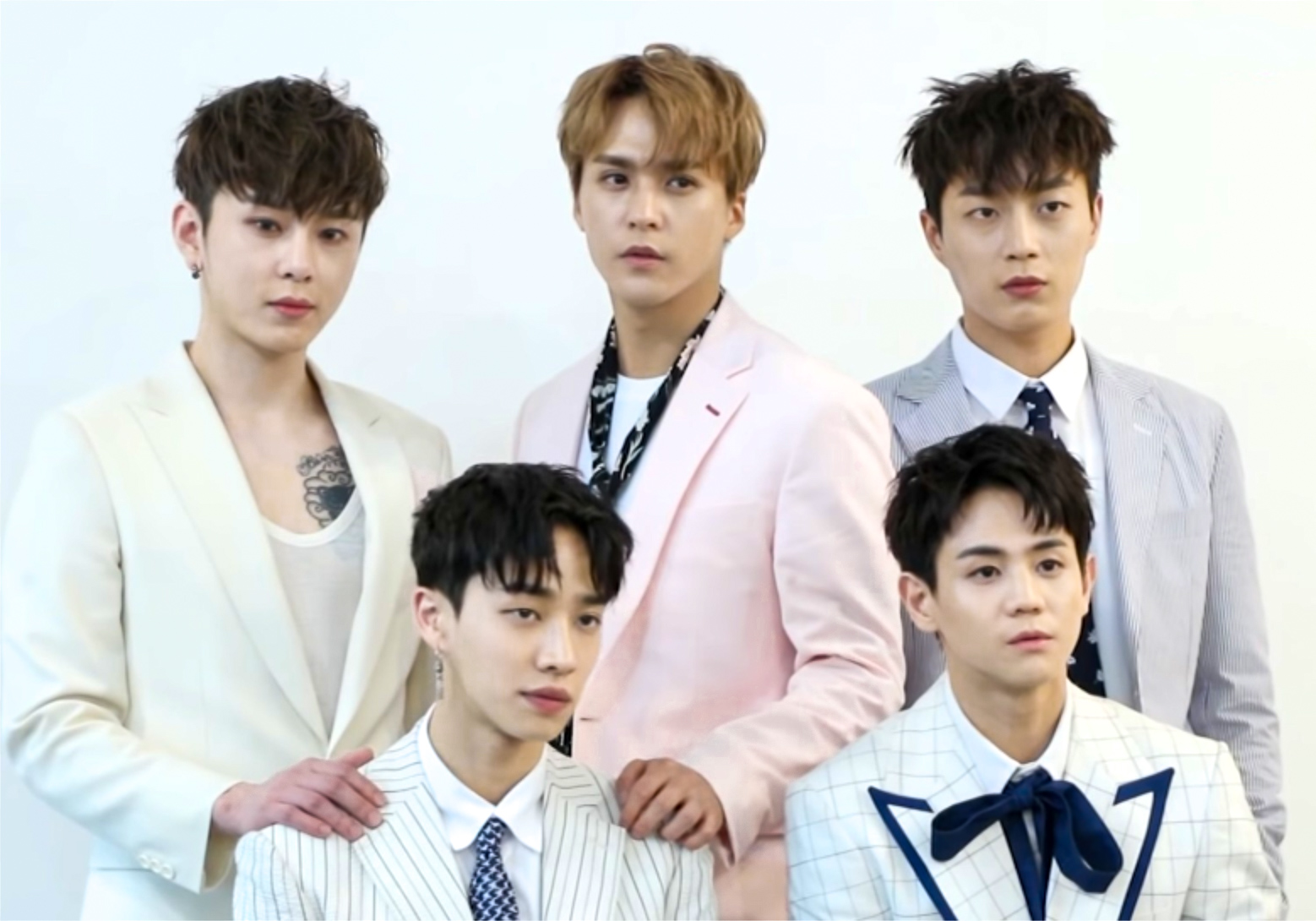
Highlight's (pictured) win for "Not the End" marked the group's first Show! Music Core trophy since 2017.

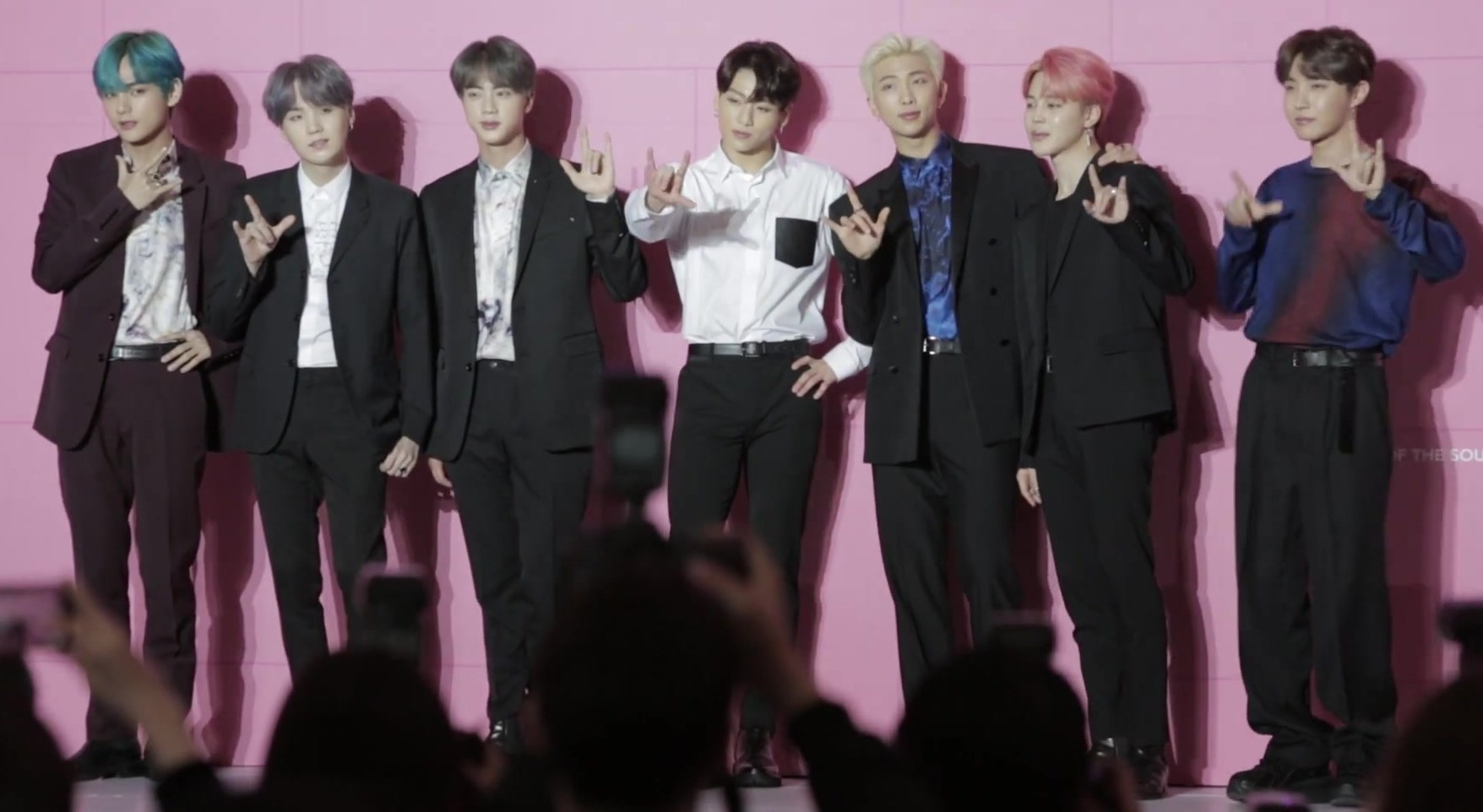
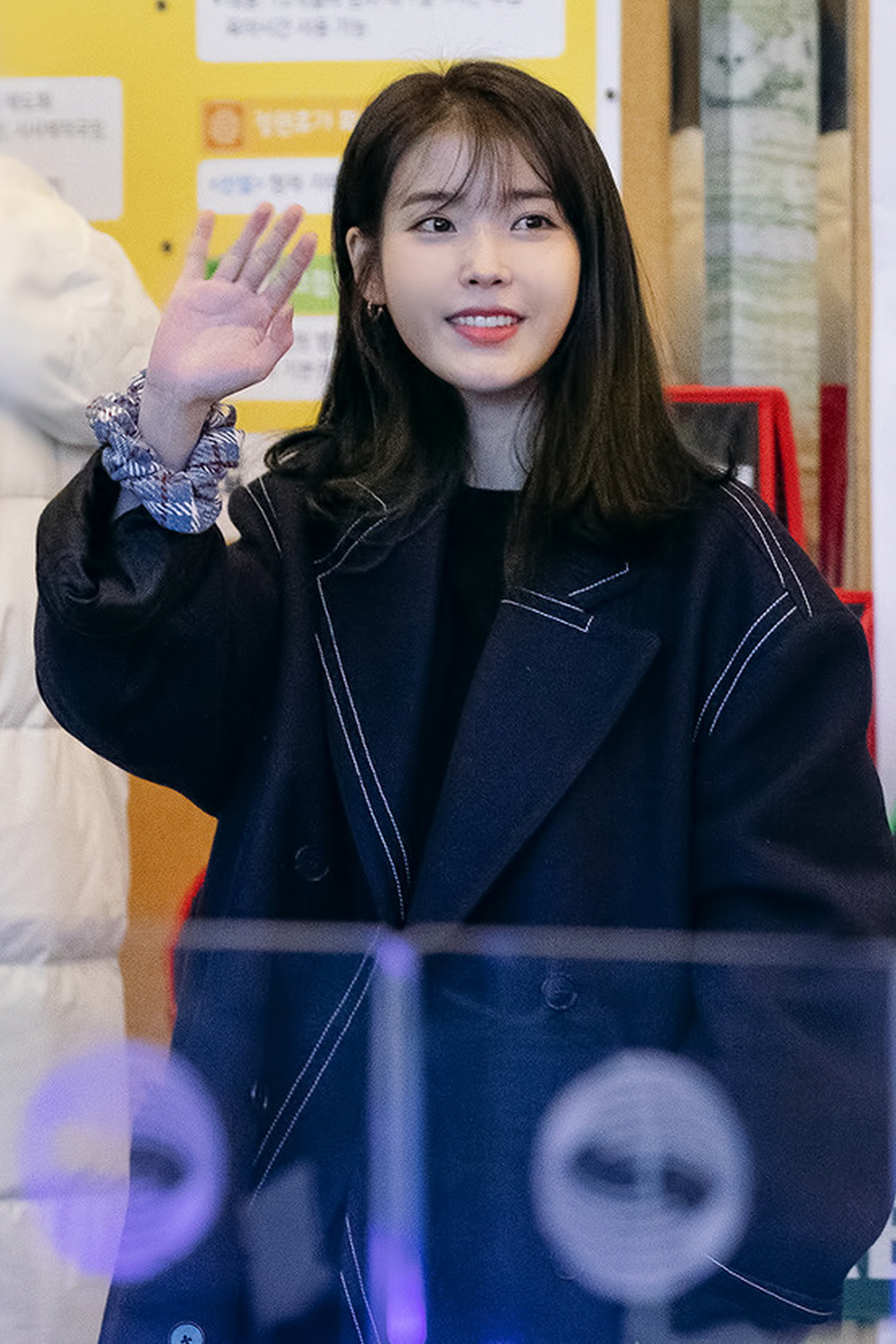
BTS (left) and IU (right) were the first two recipients of Show! Music Core's newly established Quintuple Crown; they were awarded for their songs "Butter" and "Strawberry Moon," respectively.
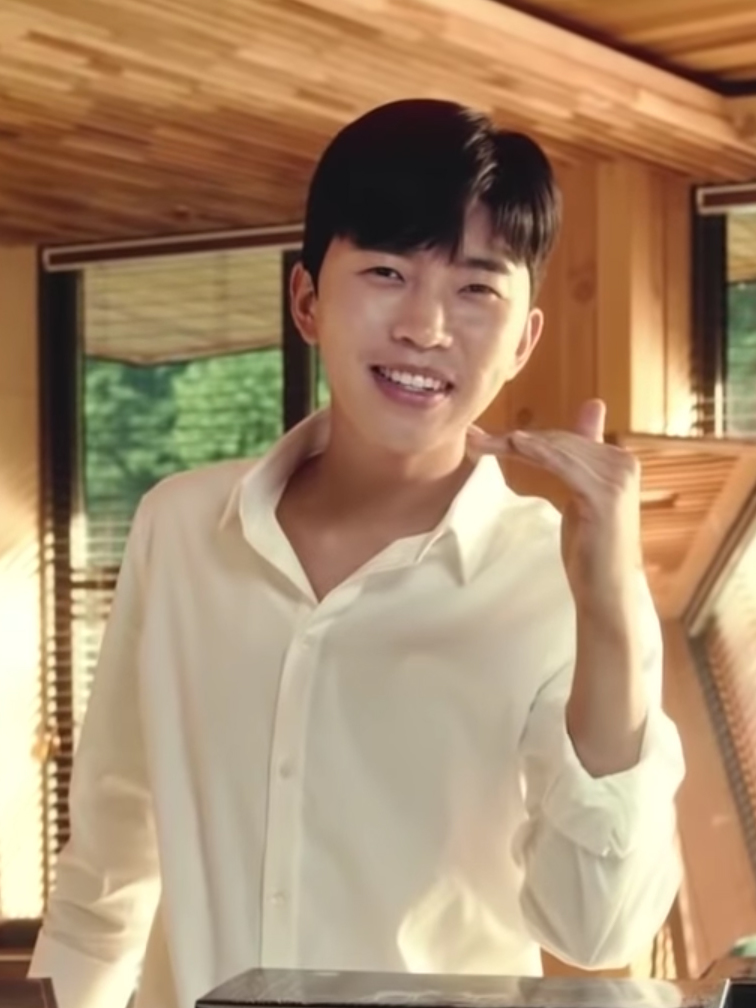
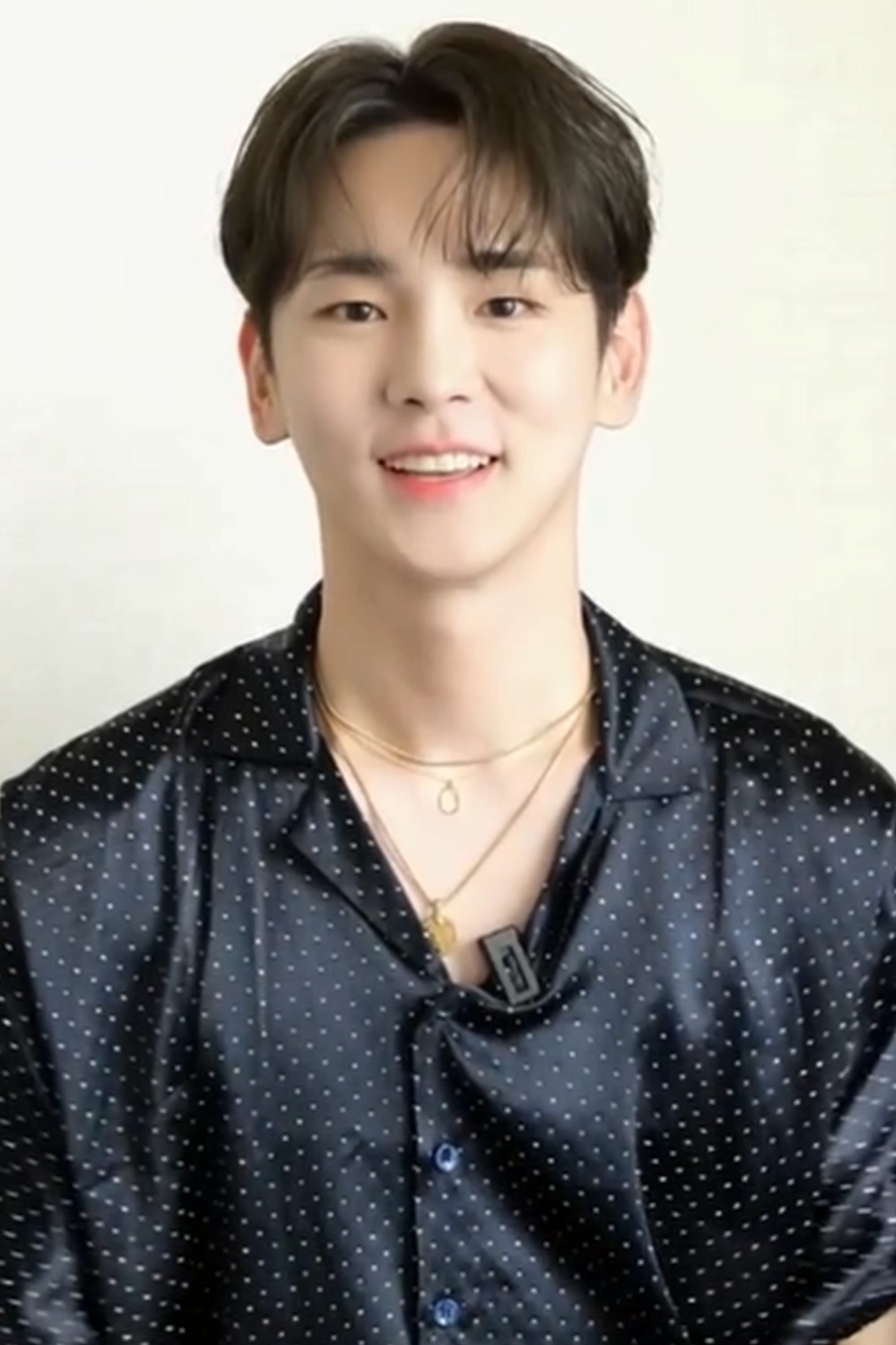
Lim Young-woong (left) and Shinee's Key (right) received their first-ever music show awards with their music show trophies for "My Starry Love" and "Bad Love," respectively. Lim became the first trot artist to win a music show in 14 years.
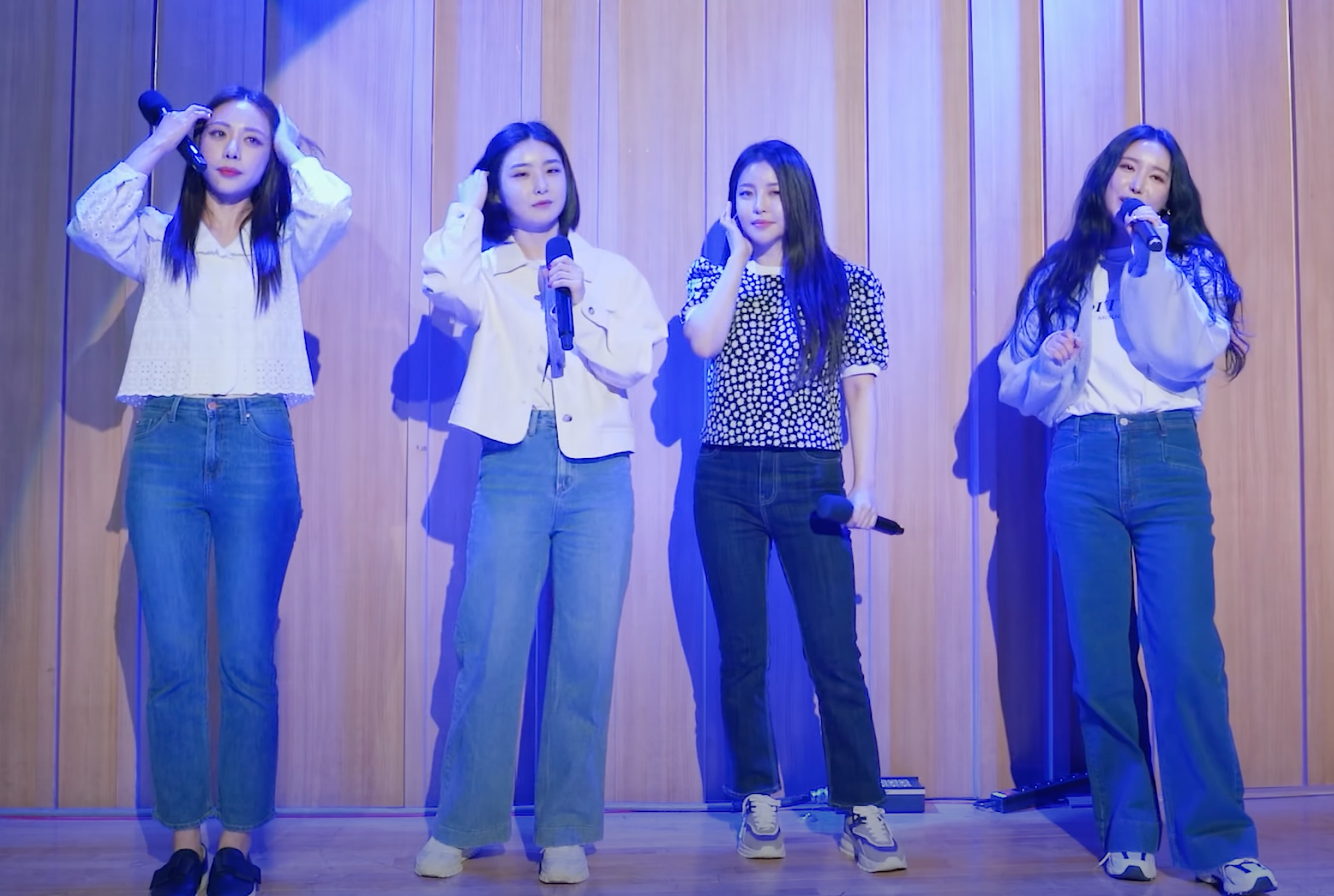
Blackpink's Rosé (left) and Brave Girls (right) won their first Show! Music Core awards for "On the Ground" and "Chi Mat Ba Ram," respectively.
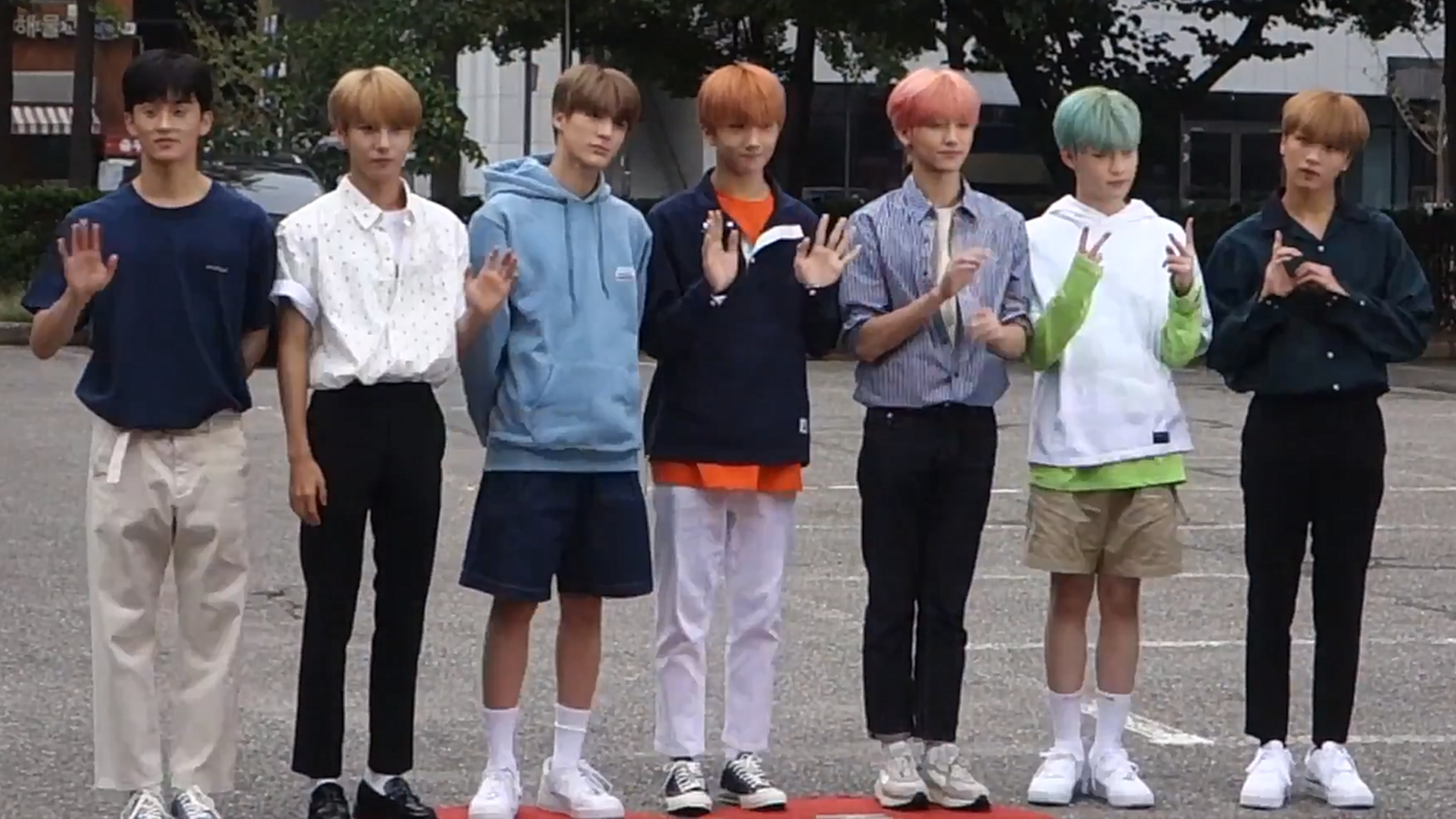
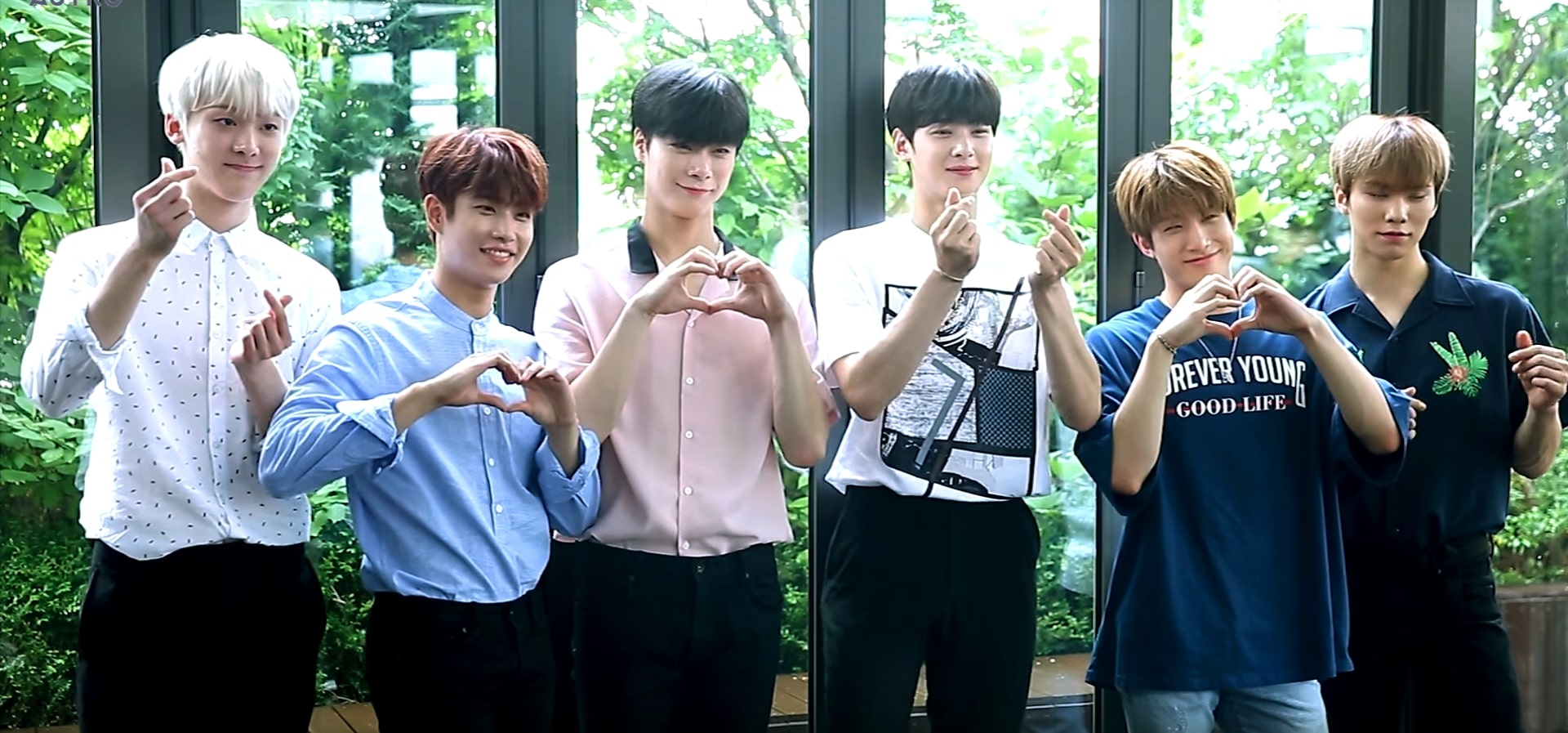
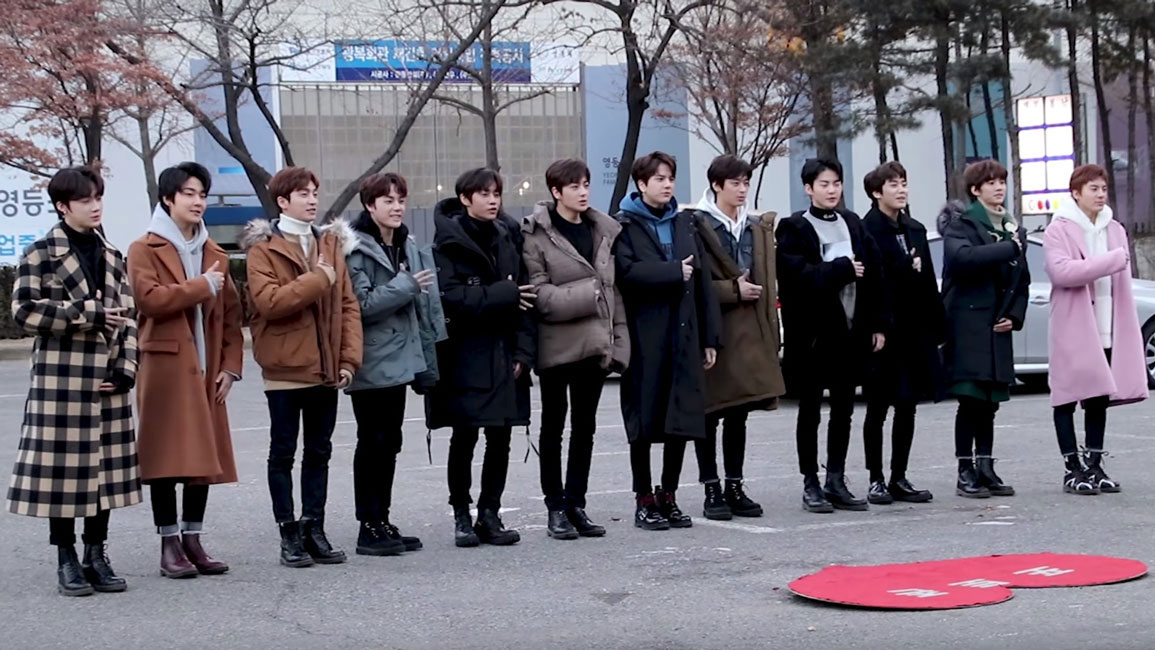
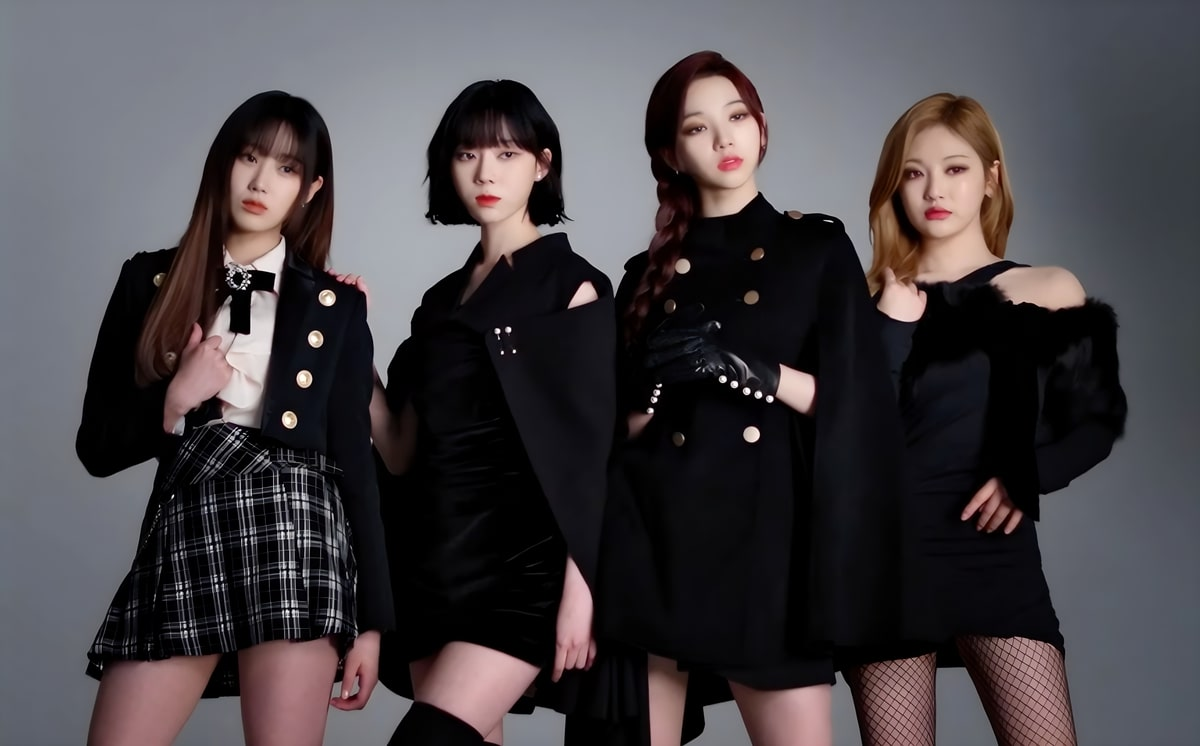
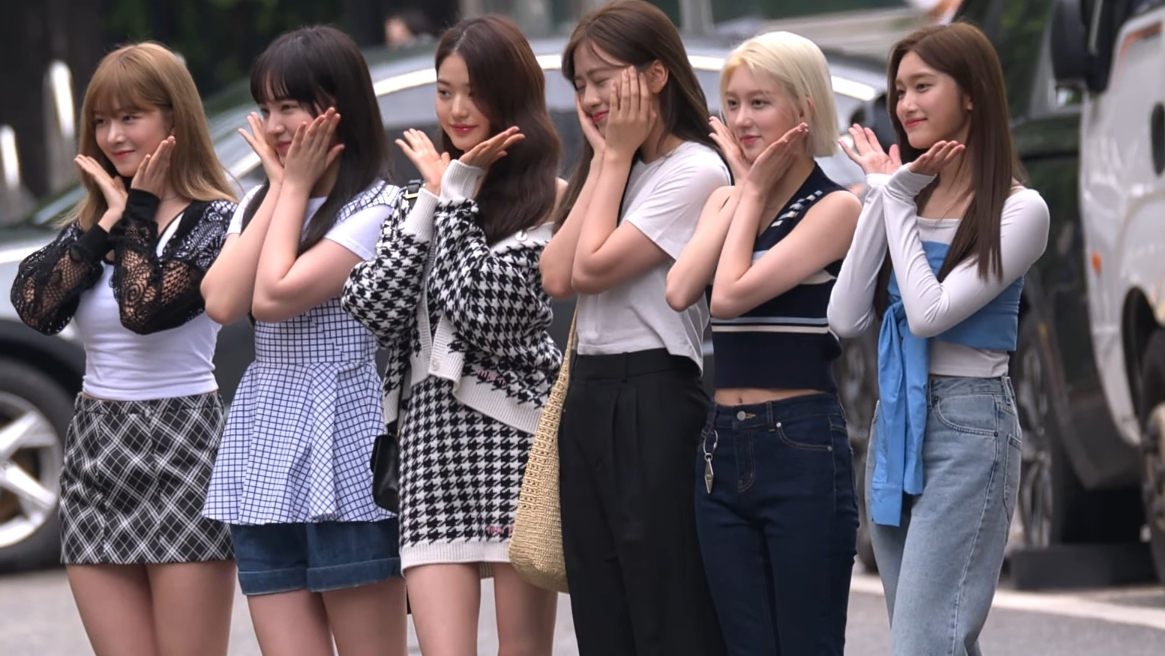
NCT Dream (top), Astro (center left), The Boyz (center right), Aespa (bottom left), IVE (bottom right) received their first Show! Music Core trophies for "Hot Sauce," "After Midnight," "Thrill Ride," "Savage," and "Eleven," respectively.

Key
	Indicates a Quintuple Crown
	Highest score in 2021
—	No show was held

Episode	Date	Artist	Song	Points	Ref.
708	January 2	BTS	"Life Goes On"	8,141	
709	January 9	BTS	"Life Goes On"	8,389	
710	January 16	BTS	"Life Goes On"	7,819	
711	January 23	(G)I-dle	"Hwaa"	9,831	
712	January 30	(G)I-dle	"Hwaa"	7,454	
713	February 6	IU	"Celebrity"	10,204	
—	February 13	No show, winner not announced			
714	February 20	IU	"Celebrity"	8,847	
715	February 27	Kang Daniel	"Paranoia"	10,323	
716	March 6	Shinee	"Don't Call Me"	9,546	
717	March 13	IU	"Celebrity"	6,935	
718	March 20	Lim Young-woong	"My Starry Love"	8,292	
719	March 27	Rosé	"On the Ground"	8,394	
—	April 3	No show, winner not announced			
—	April 10	No show, winner not announced			
720	April 17	IU	"Lilac"	6,883	
721	April 24	Kang Daniel	"Antidote"	10,702	
722	May 1	NU'EST	"Inside Out"	8,800	
723	May 8	IU	"Lilac"	6,949	
724	May 15	Highlight	"Not The End"	7,504	
725	May 22	NCT Dream	"Hot Sauce"	10,000	
726	May 29	BTS	"Butter"	8,344	
727	June 5	BTS	"Butter"	8,300	
728	June 12	BTS	"Butter"	8,200	
729	June 19	BTS	"Butter"	7,792	
730	June 26	BTS	"Butter"	7,907	
731	July 3	Brave Girls	"Chi Mat Ba Ram"	7,268	
732	July 10	NCT Dream	"Hello Future"	6,720	
733	July 17	BTS	"Permission to Dance"	7,310	
—	July 24	No show, winner not announced			
—	July 31	No show, winner not announced			
—	August 7	No show, winner not announced			
734	August 14	Astro	"After Midnight"	8,015	
735	August 21	The Boyz	"Thrill Ride"	7,401	
736	August 28	Red Velvet	"Queendom"	8,967	
737	September 4	Red Velvet	"Queendom"	6,454	
738	September 11	Red Velvet	"Queendom"	7,321	
—	September 18	No show, winner not announced			
739	September 25	NCT 127	"Sticker"	8,602	
740	October 2	NCT 127	"Sticker"	8,532	
741	October 9	Key	"Bad Love"	6,419	
742	October 16	Aespa	"Savage"	9,099	
743	October 23	Aespa	"Savage"	7,271	
744	October 30	IU	"Strawberry Moon"	6,797	
745	November 6	NCT 127	"Favorite (Vampire)"	8,456	
746	November 13	The Boyz	"Maverick"	7,435	
747	November 20	IU	"Strawberry Moon"	6,039	
748	November 27	IU	"Strawberry Moon"	5,823	
749	December 4	IU	"Strawberry Moon"	5,530	
750	December 11	IU	"Strawberry Moon"	5,570	
751	December 18	Ive	"Eleven"	7,486	
752	December 25	Special episode, winner not announced			

== See also ==
- List of Show! Music Core Chart winners (2020)
