= Antidote (Kang Daniel song) =

2021 single by Kang Daniel

Single by Kang Daniel

from the album Yellow
- Released: April 13, 2021
- Genre: K-pop
- Length: 3:38
- Label: Konnect; Sony Music
- Songwriters: Kang Daniel; JQ; Lee Yeon-ji; J14
- Producer: Jonathan Hoskins

Kang Daniel singles chronology
"Paranoia" (2021)	"Antidote" (2021)	"Upside Down" (2022)

Music video
- "Antidote" on YouTube

"Antidote" is a song by South Korean singer Kang Daniel. It was released on April 13, 2021 by Konnect Entertainment and distributed by Sony Music Korea. The song serves as the lead single from his fourth EP Yellow.

== Background and composition ==
With the single being inspired by Kang's personal experiences, he was asked what his antidote was during the difficult period he drew inspiration from. He expressed gratitude for the people around him who created "a great sense of stability" in response to this and specifically noted his manager, Konnect Entertainment's company staff as a whole, and his dance team.

"Antidote" is an alternative R&B song with rock elements that blends grunge guitar riffs with 808 beats. In an interview with fashion-industry trade journal WWD, Kang revealed that he drew inspiration for the various tracks on Yellow from his personal experiences during a difficult period in his career and is credited as the main lyricist for lead single "Antidote". When asked how it connects to the pre-released single "Paranoia" that was included in the same EP, Kang explained that "if "Paranoia" represents the period going from happy to sad, "Antidote" represents the period from sad to happy". Lyrically, MTV News pointed out that the song highlights the hardship and heartaches Kang has experienced throughout his career and his desire for a magical cure-all that would make them all disappear when he sings "I'm begging for the Antidote / Wipe my slate clean".

== Music video ==
The music video for "Antidote" was directed by Rigend Film and premiered on Konnect Entertainment's YouTube channel at 18:00 (KST) on April 13, 2021. It was preceded by two teasers released on the same platform on April 7 and 12. Konnect Entertainment noted that the storytelling in the video was connected to the previously released single "Paranoia".

In "Antidote," a silhouetted crowd aims yellow phone screens as he performs on stage. His reflection is often distorted through mirrors and water; at one point, he frantically sprints through a disorienting industrial space before emerging onto a rooftop to blue skies.

— WWD describing the "Antidote" music video

In connection with the lyrics of the song, MTV News pointed out that the visual continues that search of salvation, juxtaposing scenes of him performing in front of a crowd with him curled into a ball, hiding from the world. It exceeded 10 million views in 12 hours, besting Kang's previous record and later becoming his first solo music video to exceed 30 million views, doing so in four days.

== Commercial performance ==
"Antidote" is Kang's first domestic number one single on the Gaon Digital Chart for the chart issue dated April 11–17, 2021. According to the Korea Music Content Association, Kang achieved his first Gaon quadruple crown during the sixteenth week of 2021 in part due to "Antidote" ranking first in the digital, download, and BGM charts. The song won a total of five music show trophies including his first Inkigayo win since debuting as a solo artist.

== Critical reception ==
"Antidote" was included in a hand-picked selection of songs under the name "Bop Shop" from the team at MTV News with the single being included as the only K-pop song among eight selections. Writing for MTV News, Emlyn Travis stated that the single was "raw and honest" and highlighted Kang's "artistry and humanity". In an in-depth review of the "10 Best K-pop Albums of 2021", Rolling Stone India described the lead single as "the absolute masterpiece of Yellow". Flaunt also noted that the song had "mesmerizing choreography and lyrical references".

Listicle for "Antidote"
Publication	List	Rank	Ref.
MTV News	Bop Shop - These Tracks Will Get You Through the Weekend	—N/a	

== Live performances ==
Kang performed "Antidote" on the Recording Academy's Press Play At Home as the first K-pop solo artist and third overall K-pop act to appear on the series. Famous for its Grammy Awards, the Recording Academy noted that "K-pop singer/songwriter Kang Daniel delivers a mesmerizing performance [...] complete with colorful lights and fierce choreography."

== Charts ==
Chart (2021)	Peak position
South Korea (Gaon)	1
South Korea (Kpop Hot 100)	56
US World Digital Song Sales (Billboard)	21

== Accolades ==
Year	Award	Category	Result	Ref.
2021	Asian Pop Music Awards (Note: Hosted by the Hong Kong Asia Pacific International Group and Sunway Records, the Asian Pop Music Awards bases its winners on the "Asian Pop Music Chart" which opened in September 2019.)	Top 20 Songs of the Year – Overseas	Won	
2021	Gaon Chart Music Awards	Song of the Year – April	Won	

=== Music program awards ===
Program	Date	Ref.
The Show (SBS MTV)	April 20, 2021	
Show Champion (MBC M)	April 21, 2021	
Music Bank (KBS2)	April 23, 2021	
Show! Music Core (MBC)	April 24, 2021	
Inkigayo (SBS)	April 25, 2021	

== Release history ==
Region	Date	Format	Label
Various	April 13, 2021	Digital download; streaming	Konnect Entertainment; Sony Music

== See also ==
- List of Gaon Digital Chart number ones of 2021
- List of K-pop songs on the Billboard charts
- List of The Show Chart winners (2021)
- List of Show Champion Chart winners (2021)
- List of Music Bank Chart winners (2021)
- List of Show! Music Core Chart winners (2021)
- List of Inkigayo Chart winners (2021)
