= List of Show Champion Chart winners (2021) =

Winners of South Korean music program Show Champion

Show Champion Chart winners (2021)

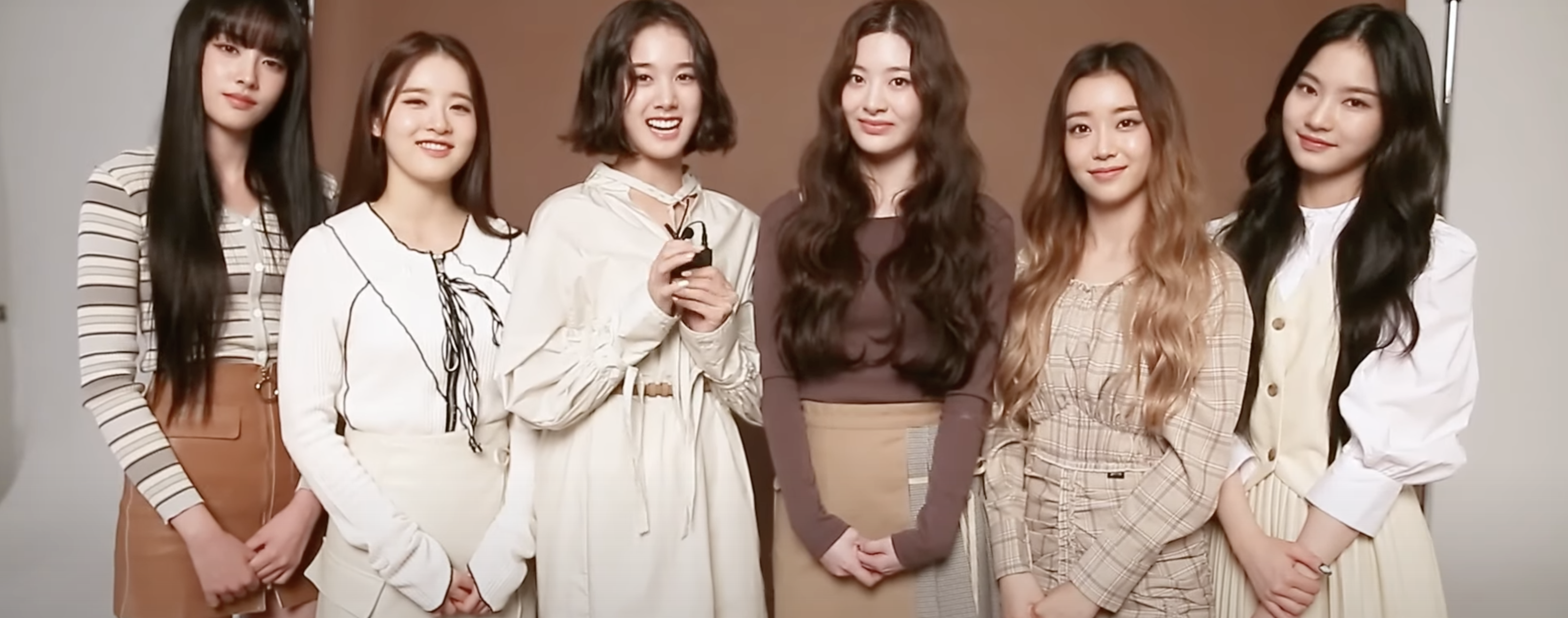
Starting in 2021, Show Champion began revealing total scores for each episode's nominees and winner, with STAYC's (pictured) "Stereotype" receiving the highest score with 8,161 points. The win also marked the group's first Show Champion trophy.

The Show Champion Chart is a record chart on the South Korean MBC M television music program Show Champion. Every week, the show awards the best-performing single on the chart in the country during its live broadcast.

In 2021, 33 singles ranked number one on the chart, and 24 music acts received an award trophy for this feat.

Starting from July 14, 2021, Show Champion began revealing scores like every other music program.

== Chart history ==
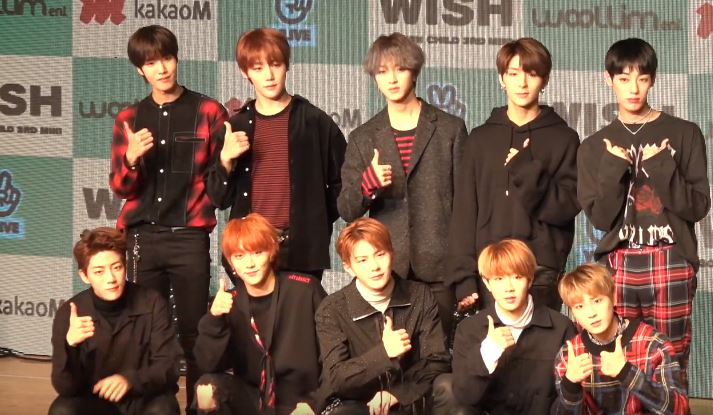
Golden Child's (pictured) win for "Burn It" served as their first Show Champion trophy.

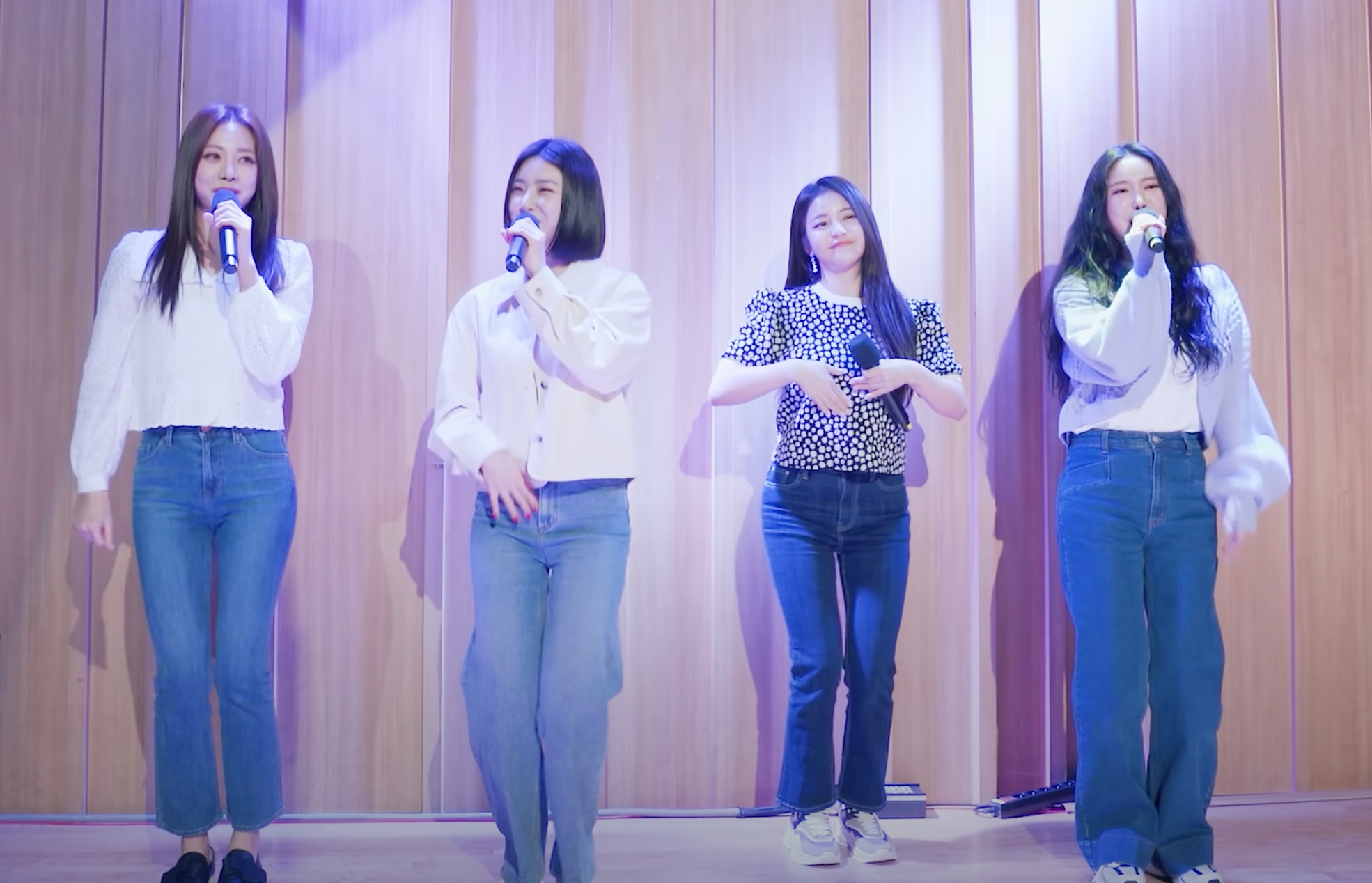
Brave Girls (pictured) won their first Show Champion award for "Rollin'."

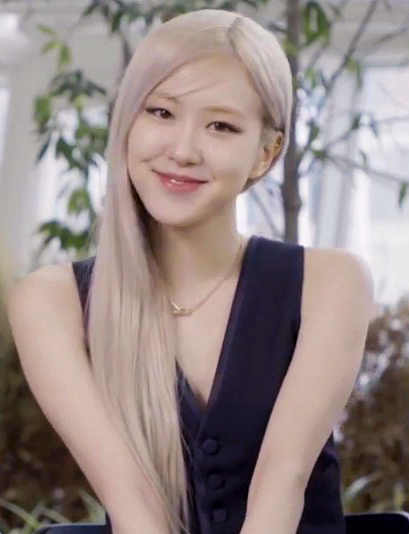
Rosé of Blackpink (pictured) received her first ever solo music show trophy with her Show Champion win for "On the Ground."

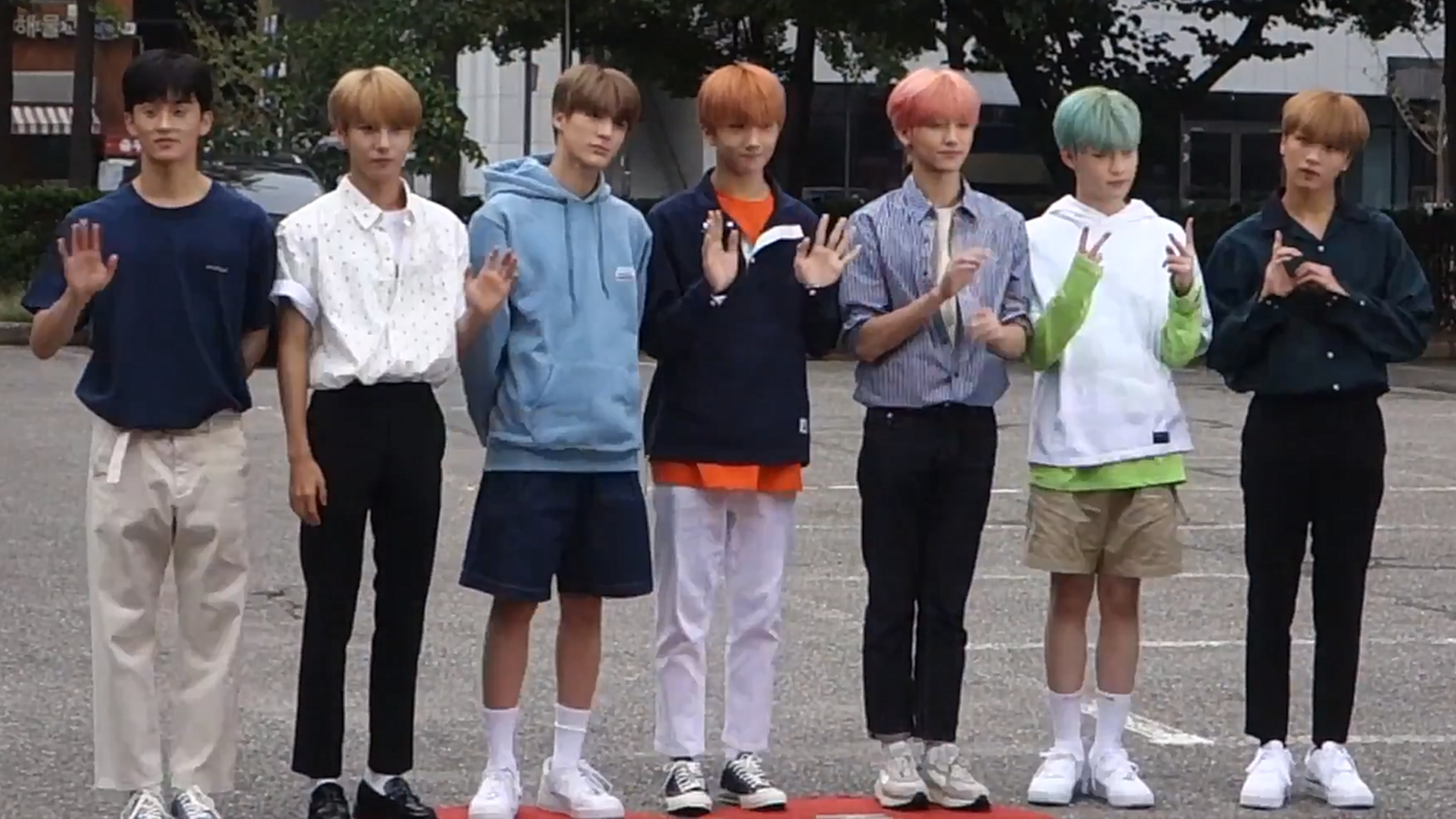
NCT Dream (pictured) won their first Show Champion award for "Hot Sauce," which marked their first music show win as a full seven-member lineup.

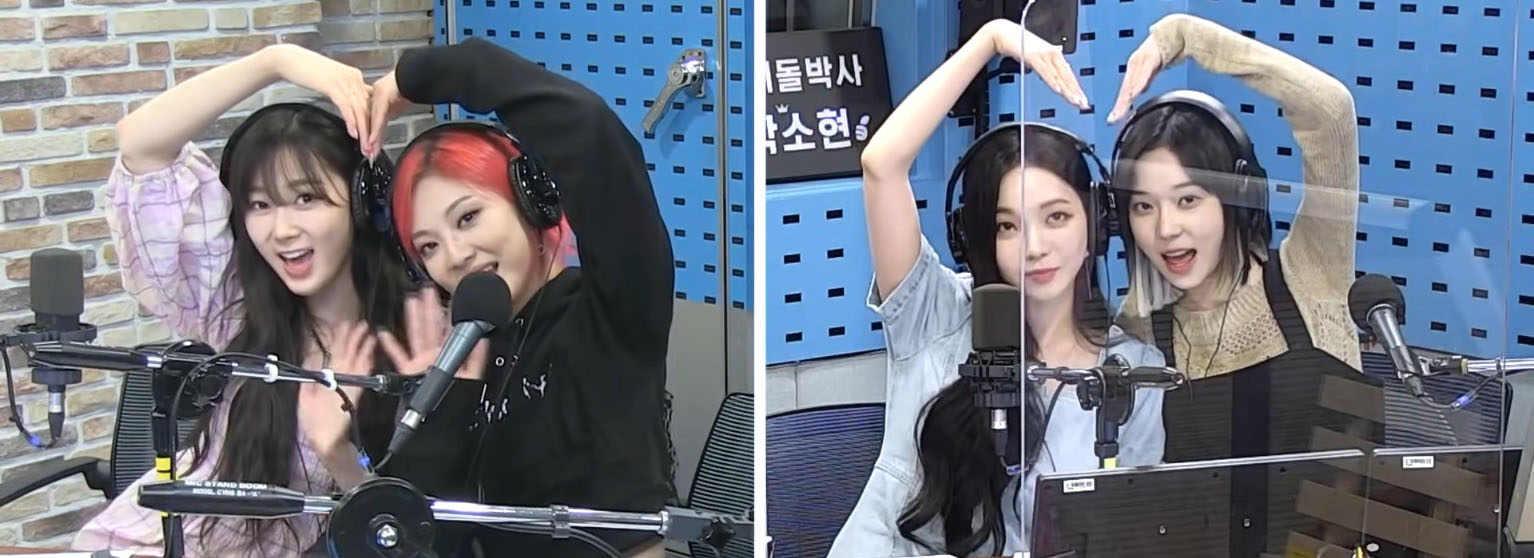
Aespa (pictured) received their first Show Champion win for "Savage."

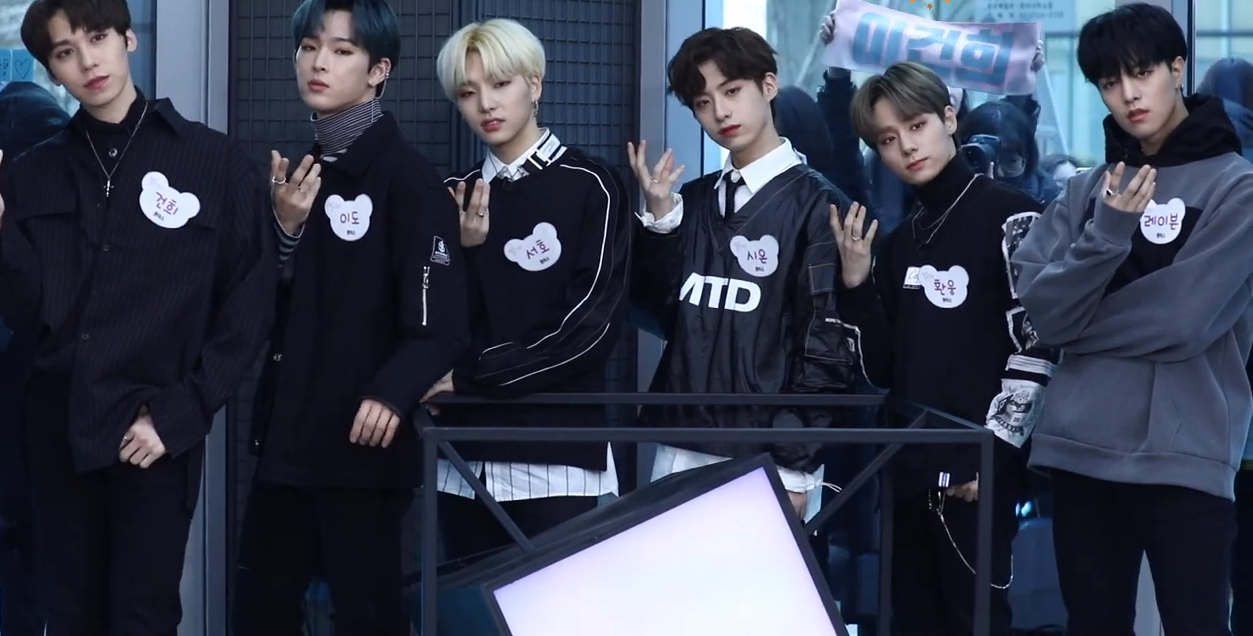
Oneus (pictured) received their first ever music show win with their Show Champion trophy for "Luna."

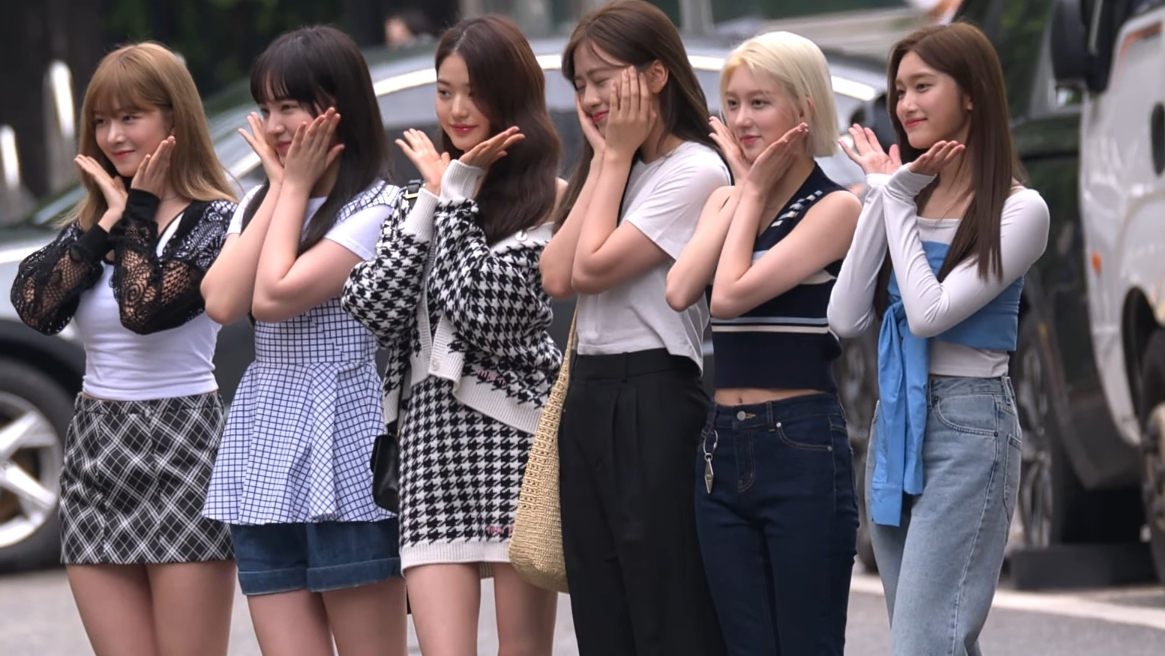
Ive (pictured) won their first ever music show with their Show Champion award for "Eleven."

Key
	Triple Crown
	Highest score of the year
—	No show was held

Episode	Date	Artist	Song	Points	Ref.
—	January 6	No Broadcast or Winner			
—	January 13	No Broadcast or Winner			
381	January 20	(G)I-dle	"Hwaa"	—N/a	
— (Note: This week's episode was cancelled due to a staff coming into a close contact with someone positive for COVID-19.)	January 27	No Broadcast or Winner			
382	February 3	Golden Child	"Burn It"	—N/a	
383	February 10	IU	"Celebrity"	—N/a	
—	February 17	No Broadcast or Winner			
384	February 24	Kang Daniel	"Paranoia"	—N/a	
385	March 3	Shinee	"Don't Call Me"	—N/a	
386	March 10	Shinee	"Don't Call Me"	—N/a	
387	March 17	Brave Girls	"Rollin'"	—N/a	
388	March 24	Rosé	"On the Ground"	—N/a	
—	March 31	No Broadcast or Winner			
389	April 7	IU	"Lilac"	—N/a	
390	April 14	Astro	"One"	—N/a	
391	April 21	Kang Daniel	"Antidote"	—N/a	
—	April 28	No Broadcast or Winner			
392	May 5	Enhypen	"Drunk-Dazed"	—N/a	
393	May 12	Itzy	"In the Morning"	—N/a	
394	May 19	NCT Dream	"Hot Sauce"	—N/a	
395	May 26	Oh My Girl	"Dun Dun Dance"	—N/a	
396	June 2	BTS	"Butter"	—N/a	
397	June 9	TXT	"0x1=Lovesong (I Know I Love You)"	—N/a	
398	June 16	BTS	"Butter"	—N/a	
399	June 23	BTS	"Butter"	—N/a	
400	June 30	Seventeen	"Ready to Love"	—N/a	
—	July 7	No Broadcast or Winner			
401	July 14	NCT Dream	"Hello Future"	6,475	
402	July 21	BTS	"Permission to Dance"	8,000	
403	July 28	BTS	"Permission to Dance"	8,000	
—	August 4	No Broadcast or Winner			
404	August 11	Astro	"After Midnight"	5,648	
405	August 18	The Boyz	"Thrill Ride"	6,888	
406	August 25	TXT	"Loser=Lover"	6,218	
407	September 1	Stray Kids	"Thunderous"	7,159	
408	September 8	Stray Kids	"Thunderous"	5,393	
409	September 15	STAYC	"Stereotype"	8,161	
410	September 22	Ateez	"Deja Vu"	5,413	
411	September 29	NCT 127	"Sticker"	7,160	
—	October 6	No Broadcast or Winner			
412	October 13	Aespa	"Savage"	6,370	
413	October 20	Enhypen	"Tamed-Dashed"	6,215	
—	October 27	No Broadcast or Winner			
414	November 3	Seventeen	"Rock with you"	5,310	
415	November 10	The Boyz	"Maverick"	6,377	
416	November 17	Oneus	"Luna"	5,638	
417	November 24	Monsta X	"Rush Hour"	5,920	
418	December 1	Monsta X	"Rush Hour"	4,836	
419	December 8	Ive	"Eleven"	8,075	
420	December 15	Ive	"Eleven"	6,243	
—	December 22	No Broadcast or Winner			
—	December 29	No Broadcast or Winner			
