= List of The Show Chart winners (2021) =

Winners of South Korean music program The Show

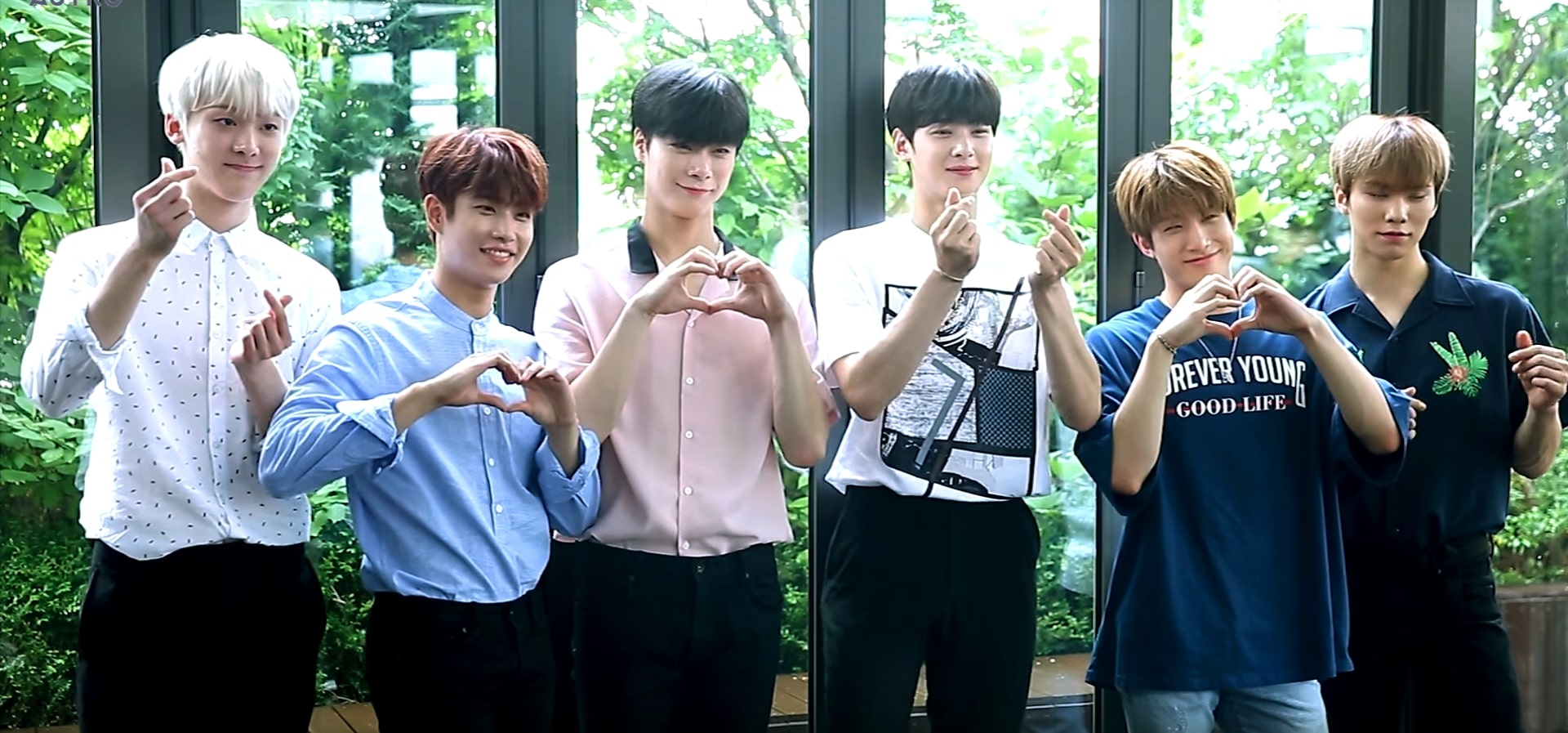
"After Midnight" by Astro (pictured) received the highest score of 2021, with 9,520 points at the August 10 broadcast.

The Show Chart is a music program record chart on SBS MTV that gives an award to the best-performing single of the week in South Korea.

In 2021, 32 singles ranked number one on the chart and 26 music acts received an award trophy for this feat. "After Midnight" by Astro achieved the highest score of the year on episode 271 with 9,520 points.

== Chart history ==
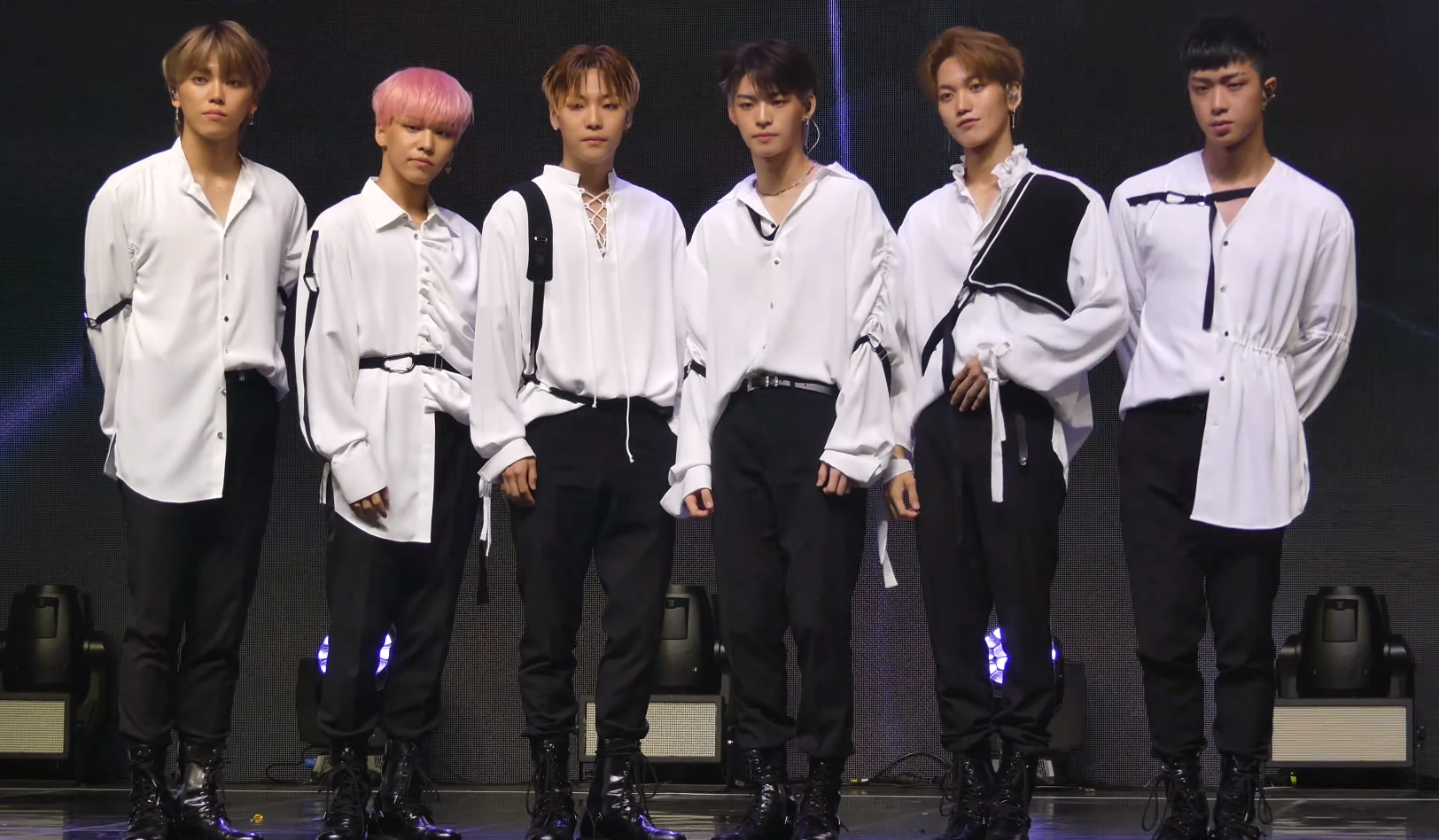
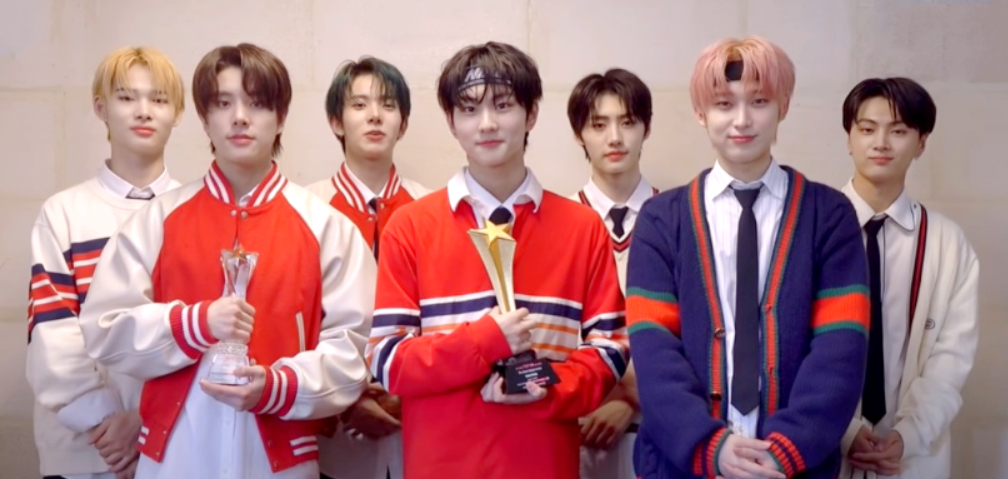
ONF (top) and Enhypen (bottom) received their first ever music show wins with "Beautiful Beautiful" and "Drunk-Dazed," respectively on The Show.

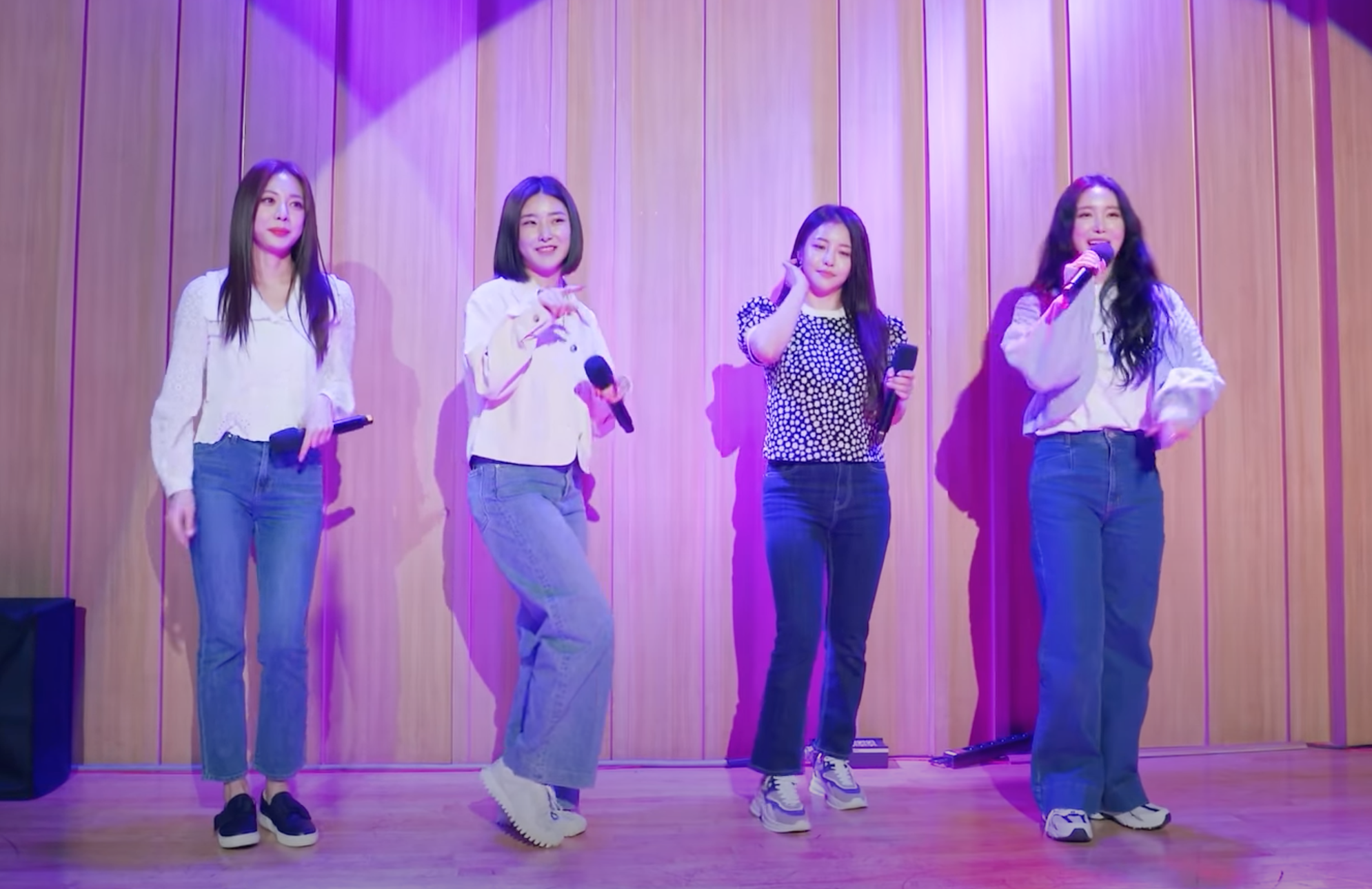
Brave Girls (pictured) won their first award on The Show with "Rollin'."

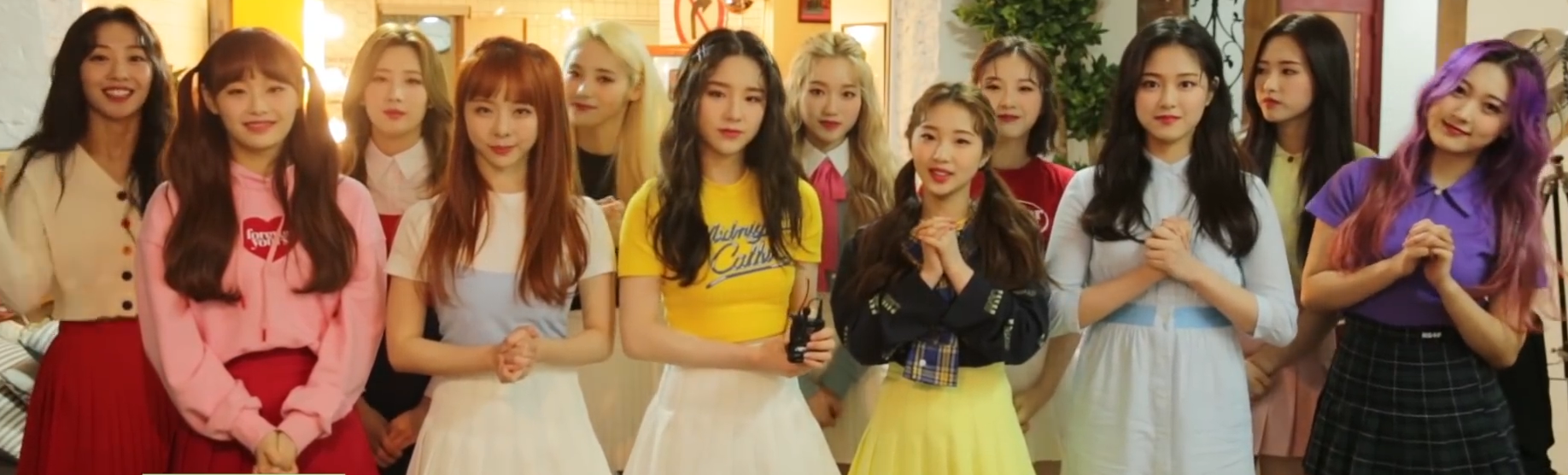
Loona (pictured) received their first The Show trophy for "PTT (Paint the Town)," which marked their first music show win as a complete group.

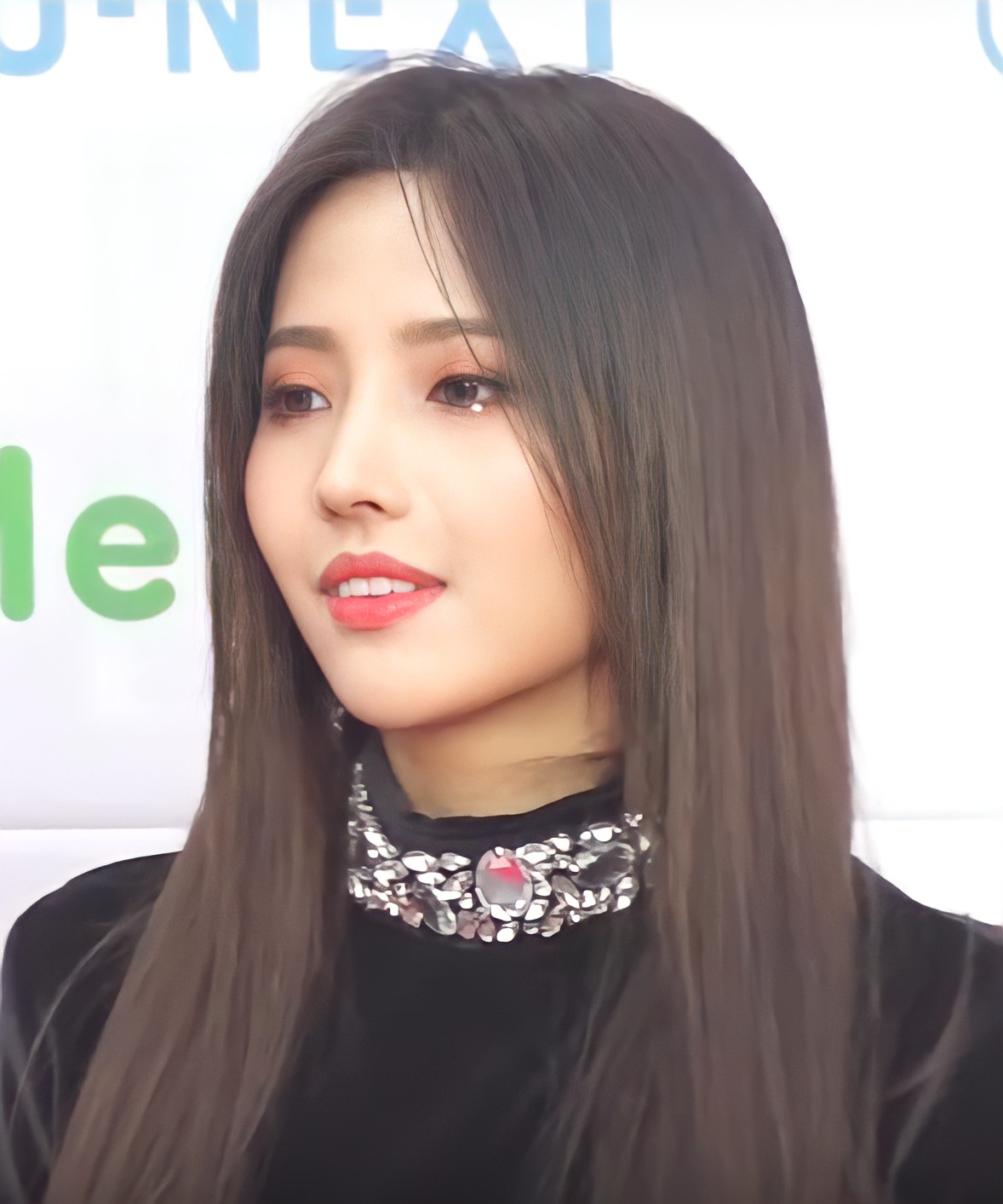
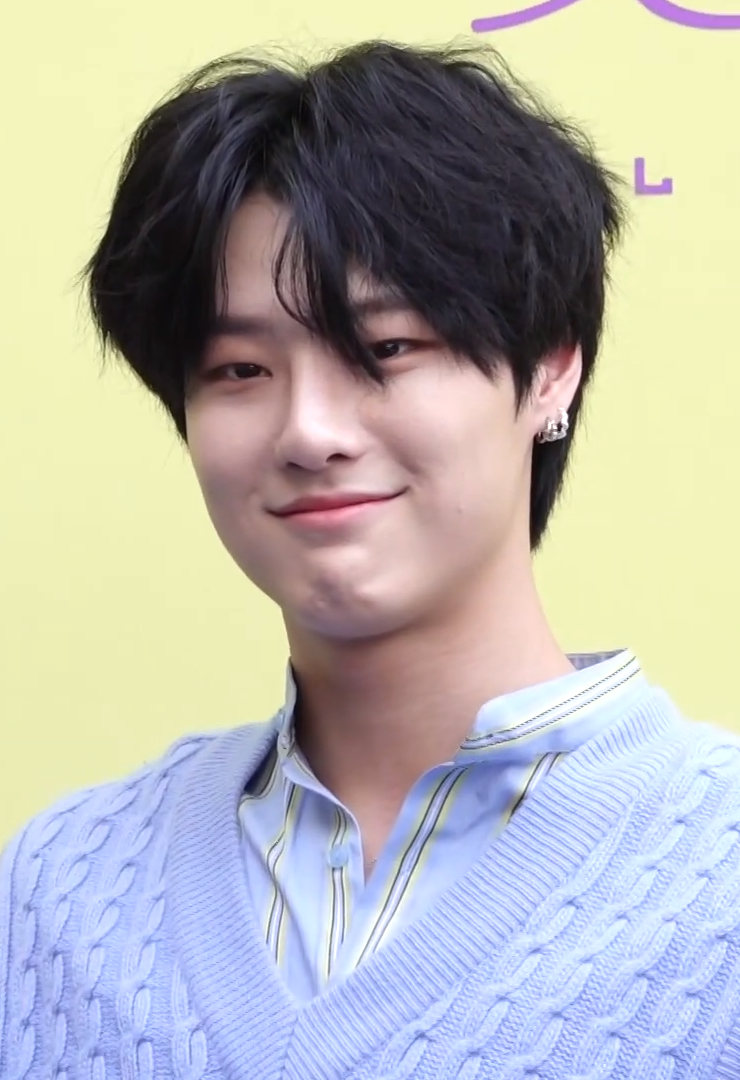
Soloists Jeon So-yeon of (G)I-DLE (left) and Woodz (right) received their first ever solo music show awards for "Beam Beam" and "Waiting," respectively, on The Show.
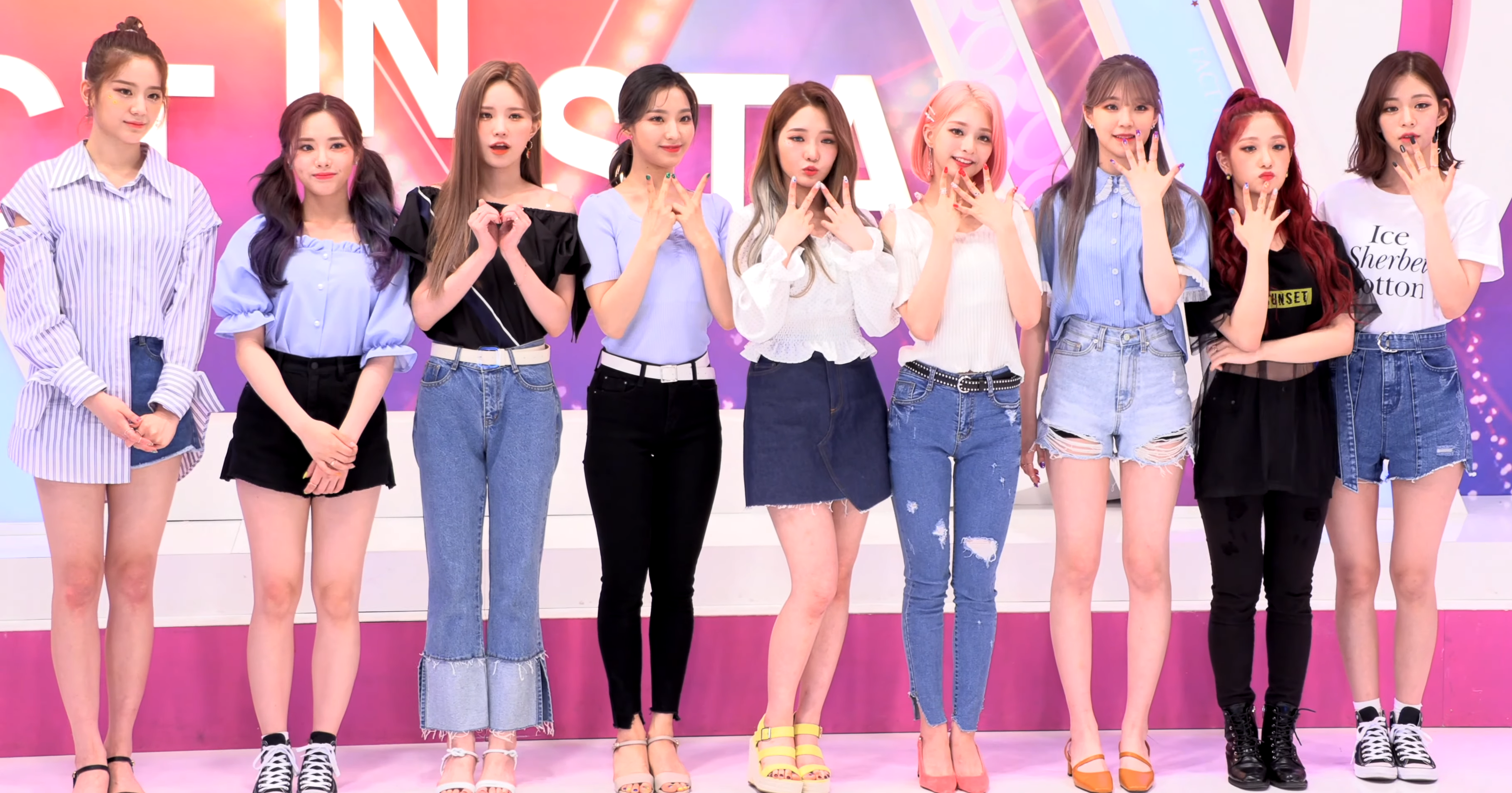
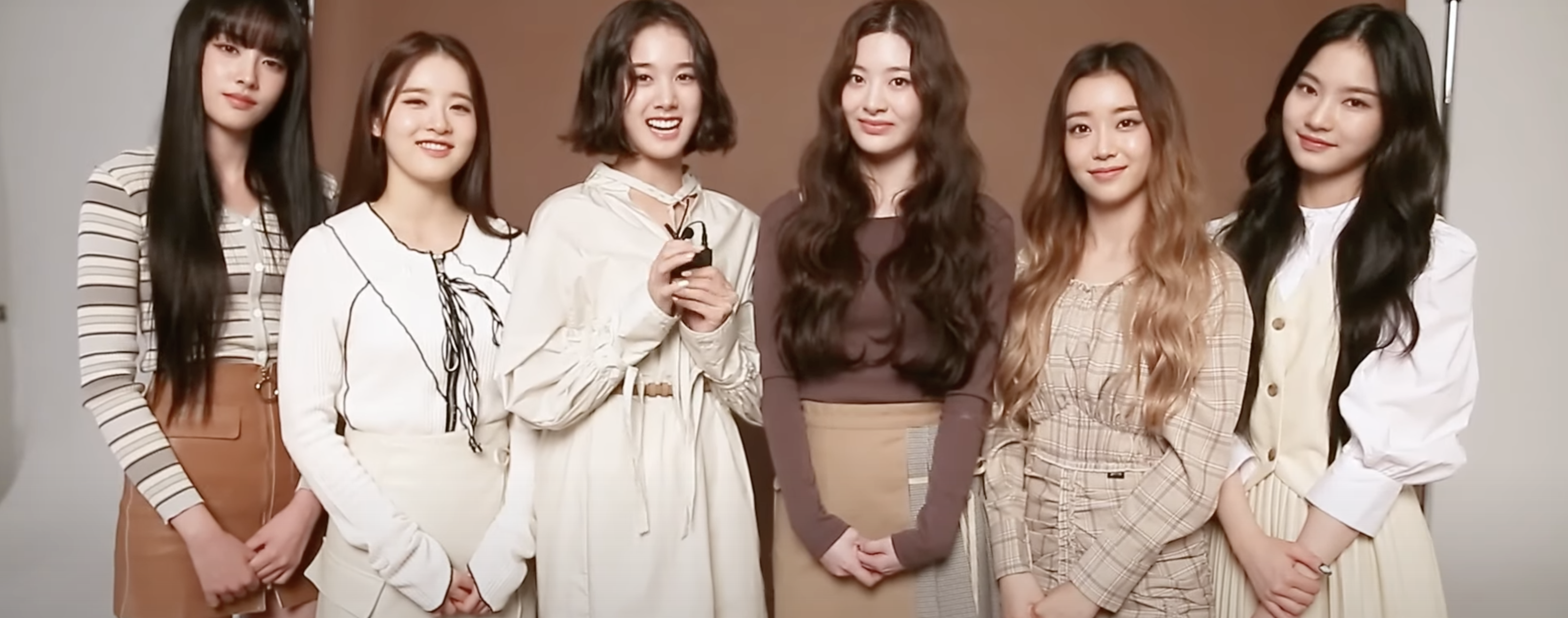
Fromis 9 (top) and STAYC (bottom) won their first ever music show trophies with "Talk & Talk" and "Stereotype," respectively, on The Show.

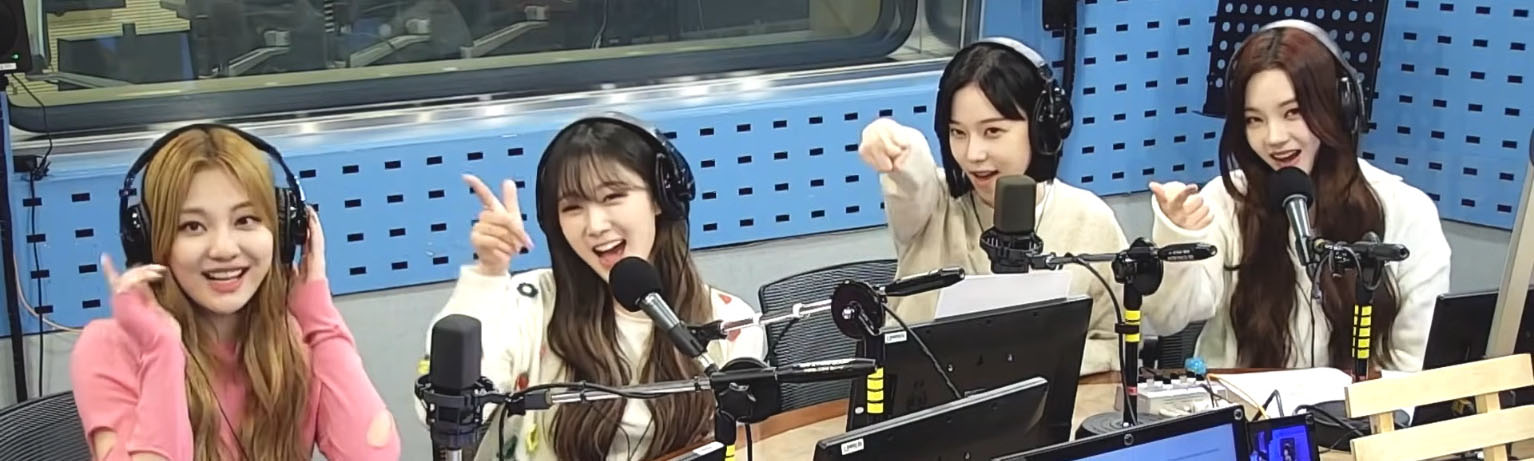
Aespa (pictured) won The Show for the first time for "Savage."

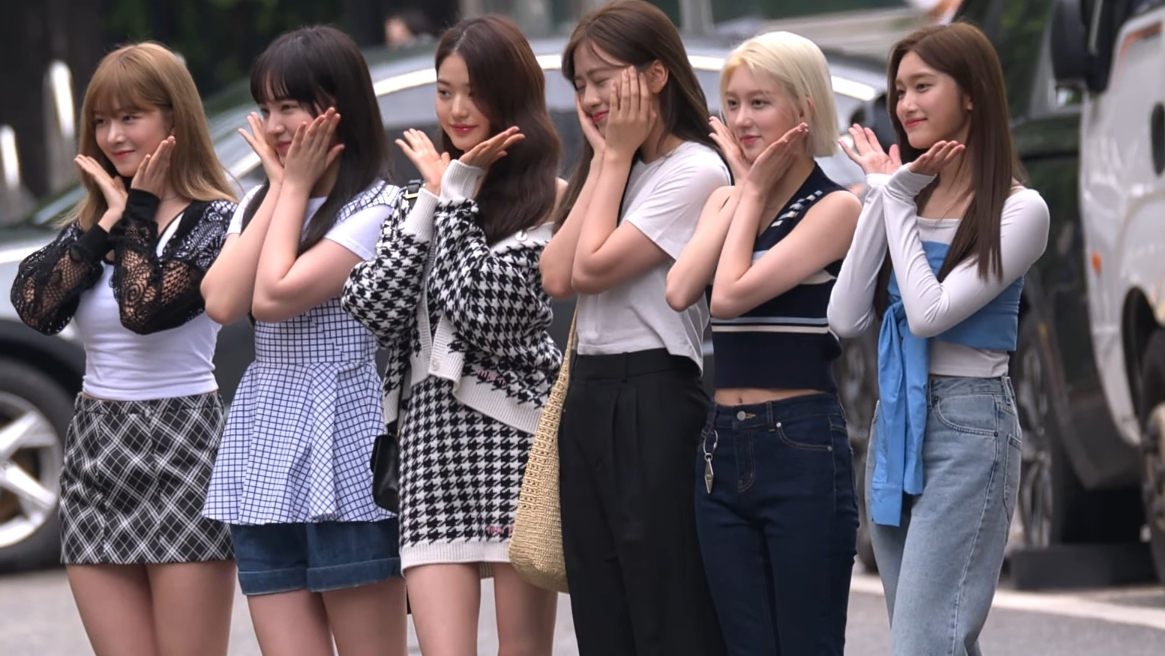
Ive (pictured) won The Show for the first time for "Eleven."

Key
	Triple Crown
	Highest score in 2021
—	No show was held

Episode	Date	Artist	Song	Points	Ref.
—	January 5	No Broadcast or Winner			
—	January 12	No Broadcast or Winner			
—	January 19	No Broadcast or Winner			
249	January 26	(G)I-dle	"Hwaa"	8,184	
250	February 2	Golden Child	"Burn It"	7,880	
—	February 9	No Broadcast or Winner			
—	February 16	No Broadcast or Winner			
251	February 23	Kang Daniel	"Paranoia"	7,985	
252	March 2	ONF	"Beautiful Beautiful"	9,040	
253	March 9	Ateez	"Fireworks (I'm The One)"	6,470	
254	March 16	Brave Girls	"Rollin'"	5,252	
255	March 23	Lim Young-woong	"My Starry Love"	6,170	
—	March 30	No Broadcast or Winner			
256	April 6	WJSN	"Unnatural"	7,810	
257	April 13	Astro	"One"	9,500	
258	April 20	Kang Daniel	"Antidote"	8,633	
259	April 27	Special episode, winner not announced			
260	May 4	Enhypen	"Drunk-Dazed"	6,790	
261	May 11	Highlight	"Not The End"	8,810	
262	May 18	Oh My Girl	"Dun Dun Dance"	7,851	
263	May 25	Oh My Girl	"Dun Dun Dance"	6,785	
264	June 1	Everglow	"First"	5,080	
265	June 8	TXT	"0x1=Lovesong (I Know I Love You)"	8,320	
266	June 15	Ha Sung-woon	"Sneakers"	6,740	
267	June 22	Brave Girls	"Chi Mat Ba Ram"	7,015	
—	June 29	No Broadcast or Winner			
268	July 6	Loona	"PTT (Paint the Town)"	5,810	
269	July 13	Jeon So-yeon	"Beam Beam"	6,742	
—	July 20	Special episode, winner not announced			
—	July 27	No Broadcast or Winner			
—	August 3	No Broadcast or Winner			
270	August 10	Astro	"After Midnight"	9,520	
271	August 17	The Boyz	"Thrill Ride"	9,400	
272	August 24	TXT	"Loser=Lover"	7,980	
273	August 31	Lee Chan-won	"Convenience Store"	5,190	
274	September 7	Fromis 9	"Talk & Talk"	8,470	
275	September 14	STAYC	"Stereotype"	8,760	
—	September 21	No Broadcast or Winner			
276	September 28	NCT 127	"Sticker"	8,054	
—	October 5	No Broadcast or Winner			
277	October 12	Woodz	"Waiting"	7,427	
278	October 19	Enhypen	"Tamed-Dashed"	7,770	
279	October 26	Aespa	"Savage"	7,048	
280	November 2	Park Ji-hoon	"Serious"	6,170	
281	November 9	The Boyz	"Maverick"	8,492	
—	November 16	No Broadcast or Winner			
282	November 23	Monsta X	"Rush Hour"	8,200	
283	November 30	Monsta X	"Rush Hour"	9,400	
—	December 7	No Broadcast or Winner			
284	December 14	Ive	"Eleven"	7,376	
—	December 21	No Broadcast or Winner			
—	December 28	No Broadcast or Winner			
