= Savage (Aespa song) =

Single by Aespa

from the EP Savage
- Language: Korean
- Released: October 5, 2021
- Genre: EDM trap; dubstep; hyperpop
- Length: 3:58
- Label: SM; Dreamus
- Composers: Kirsten Collins; Jia Lih; Yoo Young-jin; Hautboi Rich
- Lyricist: Yoo Young-jin

Aespa singles chronology
"Next Level" (2021)	"Savage" (2021)	"Dreams Come True" (2021)

Music video
- "Savage" on YouTube

"Savage" is a song recorded by South Korean girl group Aespa for their first extended play (EP) of the same name. It was released as the lead single on October 5, 2021, by SM Entertainment. Described as a "hyperpop-tinged title track", the song was written by Yoo Young-jin, who also composed along with Kirsten Collins, Jia Lih, and Hautboi Rich, and eventually handled the arrangement alongside Lih. It also continues the group's previous storyline in "Next Level", with the members and their corresponding avatars confronting their Black Mamba villain in the fictional Kwangya universe.

Upon its release, "Savage" received positive reviews from music critics for its "addictive hooks and refrains", comparing the song to the work of late Scottish musician and record producer Sophie. It also attained commercial success, becoming the group's second top five entry on the domestic Gaon Digital Chart, as well as their first top 40 entry on the Billboard Global 200.

The accompanying music video, directed by 725 (SL8 Visual Lab), premiered simultaneously with the release of the single. Sporting a dark, futuristic atmosphere, the video depicts the group getting ready to battle Black Mamba in Kwangya. Following the release of Savage, Aespa promoted the song with live performances on several South Korean music television programs and amassed eight program wins.

== Background and release ==
On September 13, 2021, SM Entertainment announced that Aespa would be releasing their first extended play titled Savage with the lead single of the same name on October 5. On October 4, the teaser for the music video was released. The song along with its music video was released on October 5. "Savage" was written by Kirsten Collins, Jia Lih, Yoo Young-jin and Hautboi Rich. It was engineered by Young-jin, who was additionally responsible for mixing which took place at SM BoomingSystem. "Savage" was released for digital download and streaming as the lead single from EP of the same name on October 5, 2021, by SM Entertainment.

== Composition ==
"Savage"
"Savage" is a song with blend of trap, dubstep, and hyperpop genres, with "drums and basses" as the main focus.

"Savage" was composed by Kirsten Collins, Jia Lih, and Hautboi Rich, along with Yoo Young-jin, who also wrote the Korean lyrics of the song. On an online press conference held to commemorate the release of Aespa's first EP, Karina revealed that Lee Soo-man directed the chorus part of the song and said that the "Zu zu zu zu" segment of the song was recorded by Yoo. Musically, the song was described as a song with "eclectic blend of genres, including trap, dubstep and intense power balladry with "drums and basses" as the main focus. The song starts with Winter scoffing, "Oh my gosh/ Don't you know I'm a savage?" Regina Kim of MTV News described it as a "hyperpop-tinged title track". Carmen Chin of NME noted the song for its hip-hop beats that are fused with the "crunchy hyperpop synths", while also mentioning the "catchy chorus" that makes full use of a sing-talk chorus. Crystal Bell of Paper mentioned the hyperpop hodgepodge of brash synths, trap beats, and earworm hooks on the song. It was composed in the key of A major, with a tempo of 147 beats per minute. Lyrically, it contains Aespa's worldview where the group and their avatar, aes, are going to Kwangya, with the help of their assistant naevis in confronting the Black Mamba. Additionally, the song conveys a message of not letting anyone or anything scare them.

== Critical reception ==
Carmen Chin from NME said "the clanging electronic instrumentation that kicks [the song] off, while reminiscent of late Sophie, steadily unleashes the musical potency that listeners have come to expect of aespa." In addition, she mentioned that the song is "brimming with addictive hooks and refrains that sit on top of masterfully layered production" which further "perfecting the edginess the quartet had already grounded themselves in." Writing for Billboard, Starr Bowenbank described the song as "assertive and daring", and further expanded that it "is worthy of a replay (or two) to catch every one of its intricate elements." Time named the song as one of the top 10 best k-pop songs of 2021, calling it "explosive" track with trap beats and discordant instrumentation. "Savage" was named the best K-pop track of 2021 in an annual settlement conducted by writers of music webzine Tonplein.

Year-end lists for "Savage"
Critic/Publication	List	Rank	Ref.
Dazed	The best K-pop tracks of 2021	26	
NME	The 25 best K-Pop songs of 2021	6	
Paper	The 40 Best K-Pop Songs of 2021	3	
PhilStar Life	21 K-pop title tracks that defined 2021	14	
Time	The Best K-Pop Songs and Albums of 2021	Placed	
Teen Vogue	21 Best K-Pop Music Videos of 2021	Placed	
Teen Vogue	The 54 Best K-Pop Songs of 2021	Placed	

== Commercial performance ==
In South Korea, the song debuted at position 4 on Gaon Digital Chart in chart issue dated October 3–9, 2021. The song then ascended to position 2 during the chart issue dated October 10–16, 2021. The song also debuted at position 37 on Billboard's K-pop Hot 100 in the chart issue dated October 16, 2021, peaking at position 2 for two consecutive weeks. In Japan, the song debuted at position 60 on Billboard Japan Hot 100 in the chart issue dated October 16, 2021. In Malaysia, the song debuted at position 45 on RIM's Top 20 Most Streamed International and Domestic Songs, and peaked at number 14. In Singapore, the song debuted at position 14 on RIAS's Top Streaming Chart in the chart issue dated October 8–14, 2021. It also debuted at position 15 on the RIAS's Top Regional Chart in the chart issue dated October 1–7, 2021, peaking at position 7 in the chart issued a week later.

In the United States, the song debuted at position 14 on the Billboard World Digital Song Sales in the chart issue dated October 16, 2021. It then ascended to position 13 in the chart issued the following week. Globally, the song debut at position 77 on the Billboard Global 200 in the chart issue dated October 16, 2021, peaking at position 39 in the chart issue dated October 23, 2021. It also debuted at position 44 on the Billboard Global Excl. US in the chart issue dated October 16, 2021, peaking at position 24 in the chart issued a week later. The song debuted at position six on the Billboard Hot Trending Songs, a chart powered by Twitter, to look at which songs are discussed most on the platform.

== Music video ==
A scene in the music video, where Aespa is seen after defeating the villainous reptilian eye sitting atop a mechanical hexagonal structure

725 (SL8 Visual Lab) directed the music video for "Savage". On October 8, it was reported that the music video has surpassed 50 millions in viewership. On October 23, the music video surpassed 100 million views on YouTube, making it their third music video to do so and Aespa's fastest music video ever to hit the 100 million mark, breaking their previous record of 32 days, 8 hours, and 30 minutes set by "Next Level" in May 2021. At a press conference for the song's release, Aespa's member Winter noted that the group "paid extra attention to [show their] powerful and strong side" for the video.

The "futuristic" music video features Aespa getting ready to battle Black Mamba in Kwangya. The video also shows the ae who have been infected by Black Mamba's negative energy. The villainous figure in the music video is a reptilian eye sitting atop a mechanical hexagonal structure. During the bridge of "Savage", the video turns into a 2D animation sequence as the group meets their leader Naevis. Divyansha Dongre of Rolling Stone India praised "sci-fi thematics with its high-budget CGI and polished labyrinthine set design" of the music video that is "creating a visually immersive experience".

== Promotion ==
Following the extended play's release, on October 5, 2021, Aespa held a live event called "Synk Dive: Aespa 'Savage' Showcase" on YouTube to introduce the extended play including "Savage" and communicate with their fans. The group performed "Savage" on two music programs: Mnet's M Countdown on October 14, and MBC's Show! Music Core on October 16. The group also performed on NBC's The Kelly Clarkson Show on October 16, making their broadcast debut on US television network. The song was also sung at the 2021 Macy's Thanksgiving Day Parade making them the first Korean girl group to perform at the event. On November 14, the group performed the song along with "Black Mamba" and "Next Level" for the 2021 World K-pop Concert held by the Ministry of Culture, Sports and Tourism and the Korea Foundation for International Cultural Exchange at the Korea International Exhibition Center (KINTEX).

== Accolades ==
"Savage" achieved the top spot on various South Korean weekly music programs, such as SBS' Inkigayo, KBS' Music Bank and MBC's Show! Music Core due to its success on digital platforms. The song won eight music show awards, including three non-consecutive wins that led to receiving the "triple crown" award on Inkigayo.

Awards and nominations for "Savage"
Ceremony	Year	Award	Result	Ref.
Asian Pop Music Awards	2021	Best Arranger (Overseas) (Note: Jia Lih and Yoo Young-jin were credited as nominees)	Won	
Asian Pop Music Awards	2021	Top 20 Songs of the Year (Overseas)	Won	
Asian Pop Music Awards	2021	Best Dance Performance (Overseas)	Nominated	
Asian Pop Music Awards	2021	Record of the Year (Overseas)	Nominated	
Asian Pop Music Awards	2021	Song of the Year (Overseas)	Nominated	
Gaon Chart Music Awards	2021	Artist of the Year (Digital Music) – October	Nominated	
Mnet Asian Music Awards	2021	Best Composer of the Year (Note: Yoo Young-jin was credited as nominee)	Won	

Music program awards for "Savage"
Program	Date	Ref.
Show Champion	October 13, 2021	
Music Bank	October 15, 2021	
Show! Music Core	October 16, 2021	
Show! Music Core	October 23, 2021	
Inkigayo	October 17, 2021	
Inkigayo	October 24, 2021	
Inkigayo	December 5, 2021	
The Show	October 26, 2021	

== Credits and personnel ==
Credits adapted from the liner notes of Savage.

Studio

- SM Booming System – recording, digital editing, engineered for mix, and mixing
- Sonic Korea – mastering

Personnel

- Aespa – vocals, background vocals
- Yoo Young-jin – lyrics, composition, arrangement, recording, vocal directing, background vocals, digital editing, engineered for mix, mixing, music and sound supervisor
- Kirsten Collins – composition, background vocals
- Jia Lih – composition, arrangement
- Hautboi Rich – composition
- Jeon Hoon – mastering
- Shin Soo-min – mastering assistant

== Charts ==
=== Weekly charts ===
Weekly chart performance for "Savage"
Chart (2021)	Peak position
Global 200 (Billboard)	39
Japan (Japan Hot 100)	60
Malaysia (RIM)	14
Singapore (RIAS)	14
South Korea (Gaon)	2
South Korea (K-pop Hot 100)	2
UK Video Streaming (OCC)	89
US World Digital Song Sales (Billboard)	13

=== Monthly charts ===
Monthly chart performance for "Savage"
Chart (2021)	Peak position
South Korea (Gaon)	3
South Korea (K-pop Hot 100)	3

=== Year-end charts ===
Chart (2021)	Peak position
South Korea (Gaon)	84
Chart (2022)	Peak position
South Korea (Circle)	58

== Certifications ==
Certifications for "Savage"
Region	Certification	Certified units/sales
Streaming
Japan (RIAJ)	Platinum	100,000,000^{†}
South Korea (KMCA)	Platinum	100,000,000^{†}
^{†} Streaming-only figures based on certification alone.

== Release history ==
Release history for "Savage"
Region	Date	Format(s)	Label(s)
Various	October 5, 2021	Digital download; streaming	SM; Dreamus

== See also ==
- List of Show Champion Chart winners (2021)
- List of Music Bank Chart winners (2021)
- List of Show! Music Core Chart winners (2021)
- List of Inkigayo Chart winners (2021)
- List of The Show Chart winners (2021)
