= Eleven (Ive song) =

- Japanese version cover

Single by Ive

from the album Eleven
- Language: Korean; Japanese; English
- Released: December 1, 2021
- Genre: Dance-pop
- Length: 2:58
- Label: Starship; Kakao; Kioon; Sony Japan
- Composers: Peter Rycroft; Lauren Aquilina; Ryan S. Jhun
- Lyricist: Seo Ji-eum

Ive singles chronology
"Eleven" (2021)	"Love Dive" (2022)

Music video
- "Eleven" on YouTube "Eleven (Japanese ver.)" on YouTube

"Eleven" is a song recorded by South Korean girl group Ive for their debut single album of the same name. It was released as the group's debut single on December 1, 2021, by Starship Entertainment in conjunction with the single album. Written and produced by Peter Rycroft, Lauren Aquilina, Ryan S. Jhun and Alawn with additional songwriting credits by Seo Ji-eum, "Eleven" is a dance-pop song that lyrically expresses the members' romantic feelings.

"Eleven" was a commercial success in South Korea, peaking at number two on both the Gaon Digital Chart and the K-pop Hot 100. The song also reached the top ten on the national charts in Japan, Malaysia, and Singapore. It has been certified platinum for streaming in South Korea and gold for physical sales in Japan. Ive promoted the song with live performances on various weekly South Korean music programs, including Inkigayo, Music Bank and Show! Music Core. As of August 2023, the accompanying music video for the song has reached over 200 million views on Starship Entertainment's YouTube channel.

== Background and release ==
On November 2, 2021, Starship Entertainment announced Ive's debut, making them the first girl group to debut under the agency in five years since WJSN in 2016. On November 11, the group's promotion schedule was released, with their debut date set for December 1. On November 22, it was announced the group would debut with single album Eleven and lead single of the same name. Six days later, the music video teaser for "Eleven" was posted to YouTube; both the song along with its official music video was released on December 1, 2021.

== Composition ==
"Eleven" was written by Seo Ji-eum, composed by Peter Rycroft, Lauren Aquilina, and Ryan S. Jhun, with production and arrangement handled by Lostboy, Jhun, and Alawn. Musically, "Eleven" is a dance-pop song that utilizes oriental instrumentations in the introduction with repeated percussion rhythms and marimba melodies, while its lyrical content expresses "the heart of a girl who is in love". Teen Vogue wrote that "the song, which features a light but snappy percussive instrumental, bucks K-pop trends by slowing its pre-chorus down, ramping up anticipation before detonating its catchy chorus." In terms of musical notation, "Eleven" is composed in the key of A major, with a tempo of 120 beats per minute.

== Critical reception ==
"Eleven" was met with generally positive reviews from music critics. Writing for webzine IZM, Jung Su-min complimented the track's production, particularly in the slow pre-chorus, and wrote that "overall, it is a debut single that exceeds expectations". All three music critics from webzine Idology gave the song a favorable review, where they highlighting its unique composition and the group's performance. "Eleven" was ranked number 15 on Paper's list of 40 Best K-pop Songs of 2021, with editor Crystal Bell writing that "There's not a song on this list that has made as much of an impact in such a short amount of time as the enchanting debut single from rookie girl group IVE." Insider named it one of the best debut songs of all time in K-pop.

"Eleven" on critic lists
Publisher	Listicle	Rank	Ref.
Idology	Top 10 Songs of 2021	Placed	
Paper	The 40 Best K-Pop Songs of 2021	15th	
SCMP	The 20 best K-pop songs of 2021	20th	
Teen Vogue	The 54 Best K-Pop Songs of 2021	Placed	

== Commercial performance ==
"Eleven" debuted at number 96 on South Korea's Gaon Digital Chart in the chart issue dated November 28 – December 4, 2021, and rose to number 3 in the chart issue dated January 16–22, 2022. On the Billboard K-pop Hot 100, it debuted at number 12 in the chart issue dated December 18, before rising to number 2 in the week of January 8, 2022.

In Japan, the song debuted at number 54 on Billboard Japan Hot 100 in the chart issue dated December 8, 2021. The following week, it rose to number 16. In Singapore, "Eleven" debuted at number 7 and number 1 on RIAS Top Streaming Chart and Top Regional Chart, respectively, in the chart issue dated December 3–9, 2021.

In the United States, the song debuted at number 12 on Billboard World Digital Songs in the chart issue dated week of December 11, 2021, before rising to number 9 the following week. Globally, the song debuted at number 68 on the Billboard Global 200 and at number 38 on the Global Excl. U.S. in the week of December 18, 2021.

== Promotion ==
Prior to the single album's release, on December 1, 2021, Ive held a debut showcase to introduce Eleven along with its title track. The group subsequently appeared on several music programs for the first time: including KBS2's Music Bank on December 3, MBC's Show! Music Core on December 4, and SBS's Inkigayo on December 5. On the December 8 broadcast of MBC M's Show Champion, Ive received their first music program award for "Eleven", doing so a week after debut. The group followed up with appearances on SBS MTV's The Show on December 14, Show Champion on December 15, and Show! Music Core on December 18, where they won first place in all appearances. In 2022, the group performed on Show! Music Core on January 8, and Inkigayo on January 9, where they won first place in both appearances.

"Eleven -Japanese ver.-" was performed on the 73rd NHK Kōhaku Uta Gassen music program on New Year's Eve, 2022.

== Credits and personnel ==
Credits adapted from the single album liner notes.

- Ive – vocals
- Seo Ji-eum – lyrics
- Peter Rycroft a.k.a. Lostboy – composition, arrangement
- Lauren Aquilina – composition
- Ryan S. Jhun – composition, arrangement
- Alawn – arrangement
- Kriz – background vocals, vocal directing

== Charts ==
=== Weekly charts ===
Weekly chart performance for "Eleven"
Chart (2021–2022)	Peak position
Global 200 (Billboard)	68
Japan (Japan Hot 100)	16
Japan Combined Singles (Oricon)	14
Malaysia (RIM)	9
New Zealand Hot Singles (RMNZ)	20
Singapore (RIAS)	7
South Korea (Gaon)	2
South Korea (K-pop Hot 100)	2
South Korea (Billboard)	8
US World Digital Songs (Billboard)	9
Vietnam (Vietnam Hot 100)	35

Weekly chart performance for "Eleven" (Japanese ver.)
Chart (2022)	Peak position
Japan (Japan Hot 100)	9
Japan (Oricon)	4
Japan Combined Singles (Oricon)	4

=== Monthly charts ===
Monthly chart performance for "Eleven"
Chart (2021–2022)	Position
Japan (Oricon) Japanese version	8
South Korea (Gaon)	2
South Korea (K-pop Hot 100)	21

=== Year-end charts ===
2022 year-end chart performance for "Eleven"
Chart (2022)	Position
Global Excl. US (Billboard)	171
Japan (Japan Hot 100)	44
South Korea (Circle)	6

2023 year-end chart performance for "Eleven"
Chart (2023)	Position
South Korea (Circle)	56

== Accolades ==
Awards and nominations for "Eleven"
Award ceremony	Year	Category	Result	Ref.
Circle Chart Music Awards	2023	Artist of the Year – Global Digital Music (December)	Won	

Music program awards
Program	Date (13 wins total)	Ref.
Inkigayo	January 9, 2022	
Inkigayo	January 16, 2022	
Inkigayo	January 23, 2022	
Music Bank	December 17, 2021	
Music Bank	February 11, 2022	
Music Bank	February 18, 2022	
Show Champion	December 8, 2021	
Show Champion	December 15, 2021	
Show! Music Core	December 18, 2021	
Show! Music Core	January 8, 2022	
Show! Music Core	January 15, 2022	
Show! Music Core	January 22, 2022	
The Show	December 14, 2021	

== Certifications ==
Certifications and sales for "Eleven"
Region	Certification	Certified units/sales
Japan (RIAJ) Japanese version	Gold	100,000^{^}
Streaming
South Korea (KMCA)	Platinum	100,000,000^{†}
^{^} Shipments figures based on certification alone.^{†} Streaming-only figures based on certification alone.

== Release history ==
Release dates and formats for "Eleven"
Region	Date	Format	Version	Label
Various	December 1, 2021	Digital download; streaming	Original (Korean)	Starship; Kakao
Various	September 19, 2022	Digital download; streaming	Japanese	Kioon; Sony Japan
Japan	October 19, 2022	CD Single	Japanese	Kioon; Sony Japan
Japan	October 19, 2022	CD + DVD	Japanese	Kioon; Sony Japan

== See also ==
- List of Inkigayo Chart winners (2022)
- List of Music Bank Chart winners (2021)
- List of Music Bank Chart winners (2022)
- List of Show Champion Chart winners (2021)
- List of Show! Music Core Chart winners (2022)
- List of The Show Chart winners (2021)
