= List of awards and nominations received by Kang Daniel =

Kang Daniel awards and nominations
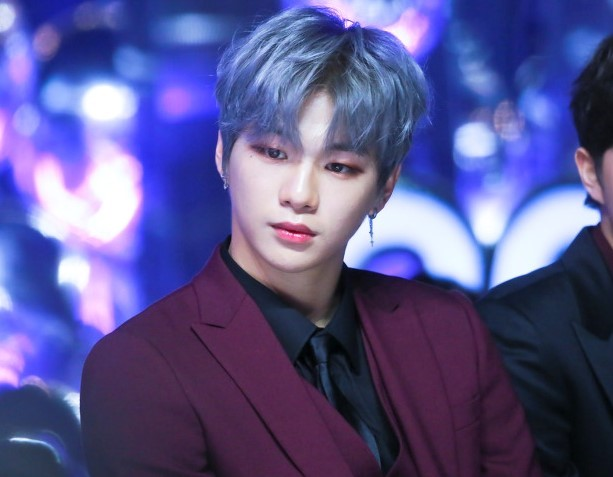
- Kang at the 2017 Melon Music Awards
Awards and nominations
Award	Wins	Nominations
APAN Music Awards	5	5
APAN Star Awards	1	2
Asia Artist Awards	8	10
Asian Pop Music Awards	1	3
Blue Dragon Series Awards	1	2
Brand Customer Loyalty Award	3	3
Brand of the Year Awards	3	3
CJ E&M America Awards	1	1
Click! Star Wars Awards	2	2
Dong-A.com's Pick	2	2
Elle Style Awards	1	1
The Fact Music Awards	8	11
Fashionista Awards	1	1
Forbes Korea K-Pop Awards	2	2
Gaon Chart Music Awards	1	3
Golden Disc Awards	0	5
Hanteo Music Awards	1	2
K-Global Heart Dream Awards	3	3
Korea Best Brand Awards	1	1
Korea First Brand Awards	4	4
MAMA Awards	0	14
MBC Entertainment Awards	1	1
Melon Music Awards	1	2
MTN Broadcast Advertising Festival	2	2
Mubeat Awards	1	1
SBS Entertainment Awards	1	1
Seoul International Drama Awards	1	1
Seoul Music Awards	4	22
Soribada Best K-Music Awards	3	4

Totals (Note: Certain award groups do not simply award one winner. They acknowledge several different recipients, have runners-up, and have third place. Since this is a specific recognition and is different from losing an award, runner-up mentions are considered wins in this award tally. For simplification and to avoid errors, each award in this list has been presumed to have had a prior nomination.)
- Wins: 63
- Nominations: 114

Kang Daniel is a South Korean singer-songwriter, actor, television host, and businessman. While promoting with South Korean boy group Wanna One, he received nine individual awards (including two variety rookie awards for his work on SBS's Master Key and MBC's It's Dangerous Beyond the Blankets). He officially debuted as a solo artist in July 2019 with the extended play (EP), Color on Me. The EPs lead single "What Are You Up To" earned him the Best Music Video award at the 2019 Melon Music Awards. For his accomplishments the following year, Kang won four bonsang (Note: A bonsang (Korean: 본상), which translates to "main prize", is a major award given at a South Korean award ceremony.) awards from the APAN Music Awards, the Soribada Best K-Music Awards, the Seoul Music Awards, and The Fact Music Awards. He also won Stage of the Year at the 2020 Soribada Best K-Music Awards which was previously a daesang (Note: A daesang (Korean: 대상), which translates to "grand prize", is the highest honor given at a South Korean award ceremony in recognition of the artist(s) with the greatest physical and digital achievements for the year.) award. After the release of his fourth EP, Kang won Song of the Year in April for its lead single "Antidote" as the only male soloist to do so at the 11th Gaon Chart Music Awards. Overall, Kang has won 63 awards from 100 nominations since the start of his career in 2017.

In other accolades, Kang has attained a Guinness World Record for gaining one million followers on Instagram in the shortest amount of time. In 2017, Naver reported that Kang was included on its list of 'Most Searched Keywords' as the only singer in the top six, placing right below the president of South Korea. According to the KBS News list of 'Most Mentioned Figures in TV and Entertainment for 2018', Kang was the only individual among groups in the top three. He was also the only individual among groups in the Forbes 2019 'Korea Power Celebrity' list to place in the top four.

Alongside his music career, Kang made his acting debut through the 2022 Disney+ Star original series, Rookie Cops. This role earned him multiple awards including Rookie of the Year in television or film at the Asia Artist Awards. In the same year, he was selected for the Seoul Mayor's Award for Culture due to his great contribution to the rise of Seoul's awareness by promoting Hallyu in various fields. Aside from the entertainment industry, Kang is also known for his involvement in philanthropic activities and received a plaque of recognition from The Snail of Love, a social welfare group for the deaf and hard of hearing.

== Awards and nominations ==
Name of the award ceremony, year presented, award category, nominee(s) of the award, and the result of the nomination
Award	Year	Category	Recipient	Result	Ref.
APAN Music Awards	2020	APAN Top 10 Bonsang	Kang Daniel	Won	
APAN Music Awards	2020	Best Performance	Kang Daniel	Won	
APAN Music Awards	2020	Best Male Solo – Korea	Kang Daniel	Won	
APAN Music Awards	2020	Best Male Solo – Global	Kang Daniel	Won	
APAN Music Awards	2020	KT Seezn Star Award	Kang Daniel	Won	
APAN Star Awards	2022	Best Original Soundtrack	"Hush Hush (Korean Ver.)" – Rookie Cops	Nominated	
APAN Star Awards	2024	Best Entertainer Award	Kang Daniel	Won	
Asia Artist Awards	2019	Potential Award – Singer	Kang Daniel	Won	
Asia Artist Awards	2019	Star15 Popularity Award	Kang Daniel	Won	
Asia Artist Awards	2019	Best Emotive Award – Singer	Kang Daniel	Won	
Asia Artist Awards	2020	Asia Celebrity Award	Kang Daniel	Won	
Asia Artist Awards	2020	Best Musician Award	Kang Daniel	Won	
Asia Artist Awards	2021	Male Solo Singer Popularity Award	Kang Daniel	Nominated	
Asia Artist Awards	2021	Best Musician Award	Kang Daniel	Won	
Asia Artist Awards	2022	Potential Award – Actor	Rookie Cops	Won	
Asia Artist Awards	2022	Rookie of the Year – Actor	Rookie Cops	Won	
Asia Artist Awards	2026	Popularity Award – Solo (Male)	Kang Daniel	Pending	
Asian Pop Music Awards (Note: Hosted by the Hong Kong Asia Pacific International Group and Sunway Records, the Asian Pop Music Awards bases its winners on the "Asian Pop Music Chart" which opened in September 2019.)	2020	Best Male Artist – Overseas	Cyan	Nominated	
Asian Pop Music Awards	2021	Best Male Artist – Overseas	Yellow	Nominated	
Asian Pop Music Awards	2021	Top 20 Songs of the Year – Overseas	"Antidote"	Won	
Blue Dragon Series Awards	2022	Best New Actor	Rookie Cops	Nominated	
Blue Dragon Series Awards	2022	Popular Star Award	Rookie Cops	Won	
Brand Customer Loyalty Award (Note: Established in 2016, the Brand Customer Loyalty Award is an awards ceremony that recognizes brands with high consumer loyalty in various fields.)	2020	Male Solo Singer	Kang Daniel	Won	
Brand Customer Loyalty Award	2021	Male Solo Singer	Kang Daniel	Won	
Brand Customer Loyalty Award	2022	Male Solo Singer	Kang Daniel	Won	
Brand of the Year Awards (Note: Established in 2003, the Brand of the Year Awards is an awards ceremony based on nationwide surveys hosted by the Korea Consumer Brand Committee and organized by the Korea Consumer Forum.)	2018	Male CF Model	Kang Daniel	Won	
Brand of the Year Awards	2020	Male Solo Singer	Kang Daniel	Won	
Brand of the Year Awards	2021	Male Solo Singer	Kang Daniel	Won	
CJ E&M America Awards	2017	Male Idol of the Year	Kang Daniel	Won	
Click! Star Wars Awards (Note: The Click! Star Wars Awards is an online awards ceremony hosted by The Fact which requires artists to win the top spot for 10 consecutive weeks to receive a trophy.)	2018	Popularity Award – Individual	Kang Daniel	Won	
Click! Star Wars Awards	2018	Hall of Fame	Kang Daniel	Won	
Dong-A.com's Pick	2019	Idol Pick Long-term Winner Award	Kang Daniel	Won	
Dong-A.com's Pick	2020	Idol Pick Soulmate Award	Kang Daniel	Won	
Elle Style Awards	2018	Best Magazine Cover Award	July 2018 Issue – Log Out	Won	
The Fact Music Awards	2018	Fan N Star Choice Award – Individual	Kang Daniel	Won	
The Fact Music Awards	2018	Fan N Star Most Votes Award – Individual	Kang Daniel	Won	
The Fact Music Awards	2018	Fan N Star Hall of Fame – Individual	Kang Daniel	Won	
The Fact Music Awards	2019	Fan N Star Choice Award – Individual	Kang Daniel	Won	
The Fact Music Awards	2019	Fan N Star Most Votes Award – Individual	Kang Daniel	Won	
The Fact Music Awards	2020	Year's Artist Bonsang	Kang Daniel	Won	
The Fact Music Awards	2020	Fan N Star Choice Award – Individual	Kang Daniel	Nominated	
The Fact Music Awards	2020	TMA Popularity Award	Kang Daniel	Nominated	
The Fact Music Awards	2021	Fan N Star Choice Award – Individual	Kang Daniel	Nominated	
The Fact Music Awards	2021	Artist of the Year – Bonsang	Kang Daniel	Won	
The Fact Music Awards	2022	Artist of the Year – Bonsang	Kang Daniel	Won	
Fashionista Awards (Note: Hosted by fashion magazine Celeb's Pick and Naver Fashion Beauty, the Fashionista Awards is an online awards ceremony that selects the best style icons based on surveys conducted through Naver.)	2017	Best Fashionista – Rising Star	Kang Daniel	Won	
Forbes Korea K-Pop Awards	2021	Best K-Pop Idols Who Shined in 2021 – Male	Kang Daniel	Won	
Forbes Korea K-Pop Awards	2022	Best K-Pop Idols Who Shined in 2022 – Male	Kang Daniel	Won	
Gaon Chart Music Awards	2020	Mubeat Global Choice Award – Male	Kang Daniel	Nominated	
Gaon Chart Music Awards	2021	Song of the Year – February	"Paranoia"	Nominated	
Gaon Chart Music Awards	2021	Song of the Year – April	"Antidote"	Won	
Golden Disc Awards	2020	Rookie of the Year	Kang Daniel	Nominated	
Golden Disc Awards	2020	Popularity Award	Kang Daniel	Nominated	
Golden Disc Awards	2021	Album Bonsang	Magenta	Nominated	
Golden Disc Awards	2021	Curaprox Popularity Award	Kang Daniel	Nominated	
Golden Disc Awards	2021	QQ Music Popularity Award	Kang Daniel	Nominated	
Hanteo Music Awards	2022	Artist of the Year – Bonsang	Kang Daniel	Won	
Hanteo Music Awards	2022	Post Generation Award	Kang Daniel	Nominated	
K-Global Heart Dream Awards	2022	Main Award	Kang Daniel	Won	
K-Global Heart Dream Awards	2022	Male Solo Popularity Award	Kang Daniel	Won	
K-Global Heart Dream Awards	2022	Fandom Donation Award	Kang Daniel	Won	
Korea Best Brand Awards (Note: Hosted by The JoongAng and Forbes Korea, the Korea Best Brand Awards bases its winners on the best brands selected by the market and consumers.)	2023	Best YouTube Content	Colorful Daniel	Won	
Korea First Brand Awards (Note: Established in 2004, the Korea First Brand Awards is an annual awards ceremony hosted by the Korea Consumer Brand Committee and organized by the Korea Consumer Forum.)	2021	Male Solo Singer	Kang Daniel	Won	
Korea First Brand Awards	2022	Male Solo Singer	Kang Daniel	Won	
Korea First Brand Awards	2023	Male Solo Artist	Kang Daniel	Won	
Korea First Brand Awards	2023	Male Idol Actor	Rookie Cops	Won	
MAMA Awards	2019	Best New Male Artist	Kang Daniel	Nominated	
MAMA Awards	2019	Worldwide Fans' Choice Top 10	Kang Daniel	Nominated	
MAMA Awards	2019	Artist of the Year	Kang Daniel	Nominated	
MAMA Awards	2020	Best Male Artist	Kang Daniel	Nominated	
MAMA Awards	2020	Worldwide Fans' Choice Top 10	Kang Daniel	Nominated	
MAMA Awards	2020	Song of the Year	"Who U Are" (깨워)	Nominated	
MAMA Awards	2020	Best Dance Performance – Solo	"Who U Are" (깨워)	Nominated	
MAMA Awards	2020	Artist of the Year	Kang Daniel	Nominated	
MAMA Awards	2021	Best Male Artist	Kang Daniel	Nominated	
MAMA Awards	2021	Worldwide Fans' Choice Top 10	Kang Daniel	Nominated	
MAMA Awards	2021	Artist of the Year	Kang Daniel	Longlisted	
MAMA Awards	2022	Best Male Artist	Kang Daniel	Nominated	
MAMA Awards	2022	Worldwide Fans' Choice Top 10	Kang Daniel	Nominated	
MAMA Awards	2022	Artist of the Year	Kang Daniel	Longlisted	
MBC Entertainment Awards	2018	Rookie Award – Variety	It's Dangerous Beyond the Blankets	Won	
Melon Music Awards	2019	Best Music Video	"What Are You Up To" (뭐해)	Won	
Melon Music Awards	2019	Hot Trend	Kang Daniel	Nominated	
MTN Broadcast Advertising Festival (Note: The MTN Broadcast Advertising Festival is an awards ceremony that showcases stars who have made contributions to the field of commercials and advertising. It is hosted by a South Korean business and economic news channel called Money Today Network.)	2018	Viewers' Grand Prize	Hite Extra Cold TVC – Ice Drum	Won	
MTN Broadcast Advertising Festival	2020	Viewers' Grand Prize	KT TVC – Galaxy Note 10 Aura Red	Won	
Mubeat Awards (Note: The Mubeat Awards is an awards ceremony in which fans from across the globe vote directly on the global K-pop platform Mubeat for select categories.)	2022	Best Performance	"Nirvana" featuring pH-1 and WDBZ	Won	
SBS Entertainment Awards	2017	Rookie Award – Variety	Master Key	Won	
Seoul International Drama Awards	2022	Outstanding K-Pop Idol	Rookie Cops	Won	
Seoul Music Awards	2020	Bonsang Award	Color on Me	Nominated	
Seoul Music Awards	2020	Dance Performance Award	"Touchin'"	Nominated	
Seoul Music Awards	2020	Popularity Award	Color on Me	Nominated	
Seoul Music Awards	2020	K-Wave Award	Color on Me	Nominated	
Seoul Music Awards	2021	Bonsang Award	Magenta	Won	
Seoul Music Awards	2021	Daesang Award	Magenta	Nominated	
Seoul Music Awards	2021	Popularity Award	Kang Daniel	Nominated	
Seoul Music Awards	2021	K-Wave Award	Kang Daniel	Nominated	
Seoul Music Awards	2021	Fan PD Artist Award	Kang Daniel	Won	
Seoul Music Awards	2022	Bonsang Award	Yellow	Won	
Seoul Music Awards	2022	Daesang Award	Yellow	Nominated	
Seoul Music Awards	2022	U+Idol Live Best Artist Award	Kang Daniel	Nominated	
Seoul Music Awards	2022	Popularity Award	Kang Daniel	Nominated	
Seoul Music Awards	2022	K-Wave Award	Kang Daniel	Nominated	
Seoul Music Awards	2023	Bonsang Award	The Story	Won	
Seoul Music Awards	2023	Daesang Award	The Story	Nominated	
Seoul Music Awards	2023	Popularity Award	Kang Daniel	Nominated	
Seoul Music Awards	2023	Hallyu Special Award	Kang Daniel	Nominated	
Seoul Music Awards	2025	Main Prize (Bonsang)	Kang Daniel	Nominated	
Seoul Music Awards	2025	Popularity Award	Kang Daniel	Nominated	
Seoul Music Awards	2025	K-Wave Special Award	Kang Daniel	Nominated	
Seoul Music Awards	2025	K-pop World Choice – Solo	Kang Daniel	Nominated	
Soribada Best K-Music Awards	2020	New K-Wave Real Fan Award	Kang Daniel	Won	
Soribada Best K-Music Awards	2020	Bonsang Award	Kang Daniel	Won	
Soribada Best K-Music Awards	2020	Stage of the Year	Kang Daniel	Won	
Soribada Best K-Music Awards	2020	Male Popularity Award	Kang Daniel	Nominated	

== Other accolades ==
=== Honors ===
Name of organization, year given, and the name of the honor
Organization	Year	Honor	Ref.
Newsis K-Expo Cultural Awards (Note: Co-sponsored by Korea's Ministry of Culture, Sports and Tourism, Ministry of Trade, Industry, and Energy, Korea Communications Commission, and Korea Creative Content Agency, it awards cultural icons and businesses who have contributed greatly to Hallyu, the Korean wave.)	2022	Seoul Mayor's Award for Culture	
The Snail of Love (Note: The Snail of Love is a social welfare organization that provides support for the deaf and hard of hearing as well as education to improve public awareness.)	2020	Soul–The Fan No.1	

=== Listicles ===
Name of publisher, year listed, name of listicle, and placement
Publisher	Year	Listicle	Placement	Ref.
Forbes	2018	2030 Power Leaders in Entertainment	Placed	
Forbes	2019	Korea Power Celebrity 40	4th	
Forbes	2022	Korea Power Celebrity 40	26th	
Forbes	2023	30 Under 30	Placed	
Gallup Korea	2017	Most Preferred Idols	2nd	
Gallup Korea	2018	Most Preferred Idols	5th	
Gallup Korea	2019	Most Preferred Idols	13th	
KBS	2018	Most Mentioned Figures in TV and Entertainment	3rd	
Korea Economic Daily	2017	Best Rising Stars	1st	
Naver	2017	Most Searched Keywords	6th	
People	2022	Talented Emerging Artists Making Their Mark	7th	
tvN	2017	Most Influential Celebrities in Korea	1st	
Zoom	2021	Top Solo Artists of K-pop	Placed	

=== World record ===
Key
†	Indicates a now former record holder (Note: Note that this does not indicate that Kang Daniel lost the record, only that the listed record holder was eventually surpassed.)

Name of publication, year the record was awarded, name of the record, and the name of the record holder
Publication	Year	World record	Record holder	Ref.
Guinness World Records	2019	Fastest time to gain one million followers on Instagram	† Kang Daniel	

== See also ==
- List of awards and nominations received by Wanna One
- Konnect Entertainment § Accolade
