= Type 910 weapon trials ship =

Class of Chinese auxiliary ship

History

PRC
- Completed: 2012
- Acquired: 2012
- Commissioned: 2012
- Home port: Dalian
- Status: Active

Class overview
- Operators: People's Liberation Army Navy
- Preceded by: Type 909A weapon trials ship
- Built: 2012 onward
- In service: 2012 onward
- In commission: 2012 onward
- Planned: 4
- Completed: 4
- Active: 4

General characteristics
- Type: Type 910 weapon trials ship
- Displacement: 6,080 long tons (6,180 t)
- Length: 129.3 m (424 ft 3 in)
- Beam: 17 m (55 ft 9 in)
- Propulsion: Marine Diesel
- Range: 5,000 nmi (9,300 km; 5,800 mi)
- Sensors & processing systems: Various
- Electronic warfare & decoys: None
- Armament: Various
- Armour: None
- Aircraft carried: None
- Aviation facilities: helipad
- Notes: 1 helicopter

Type 910 weapon trials ship (NATO reporting name: Shupang AGE) is a type of auxiliary ship built in the People’s Republic of China (PRC) for the People's Liberation Army Navy (PLAN), and it is a follow-on of earlier Type 909A weapon trials ship, which in turn, is a follow-on of Type 909 weapon trials ship built earlier.Developed from Type 909A, Type 910 is larger and has longer endurance/range, so it can take longer missions when conducting weapon and sensors trials. Specification:

- Length: 129.3 meter
- Beam: 17 meter
- Displacement: 6080 ton
- Endurance: 5000 nautical miles

As of 2022, a total of four ships have been identified:

Type	NATO designation	Pennant No.	Name (English)	Name (Han 中文)	Commissioned	Displacement	Fleet	Status
Type 910 weapon trials ship (AVM/AGM)	Dahua-II class	893	Zhan Tianyou	詹天佑	2012	6080 t	All fleets	Active
Type 910 weapon trials ship (AVM/AGM)	Dahua-II class	894	Li Siguang	李四光	2014	6080 t	All fleets	Active
Type 910 weapon trials ship (AVM/AGM)	Dahua-II class	895	Wu Yunduo	吴运铎	2018	6080 t	All fleets	Active
Type 910 weapon trials ship (AVM/AGM)	Dahua-II class	896	Huang Weilu	黄纬禄	After 2018	6080 t	All fleets	Active
