= Kang Daniel videography =

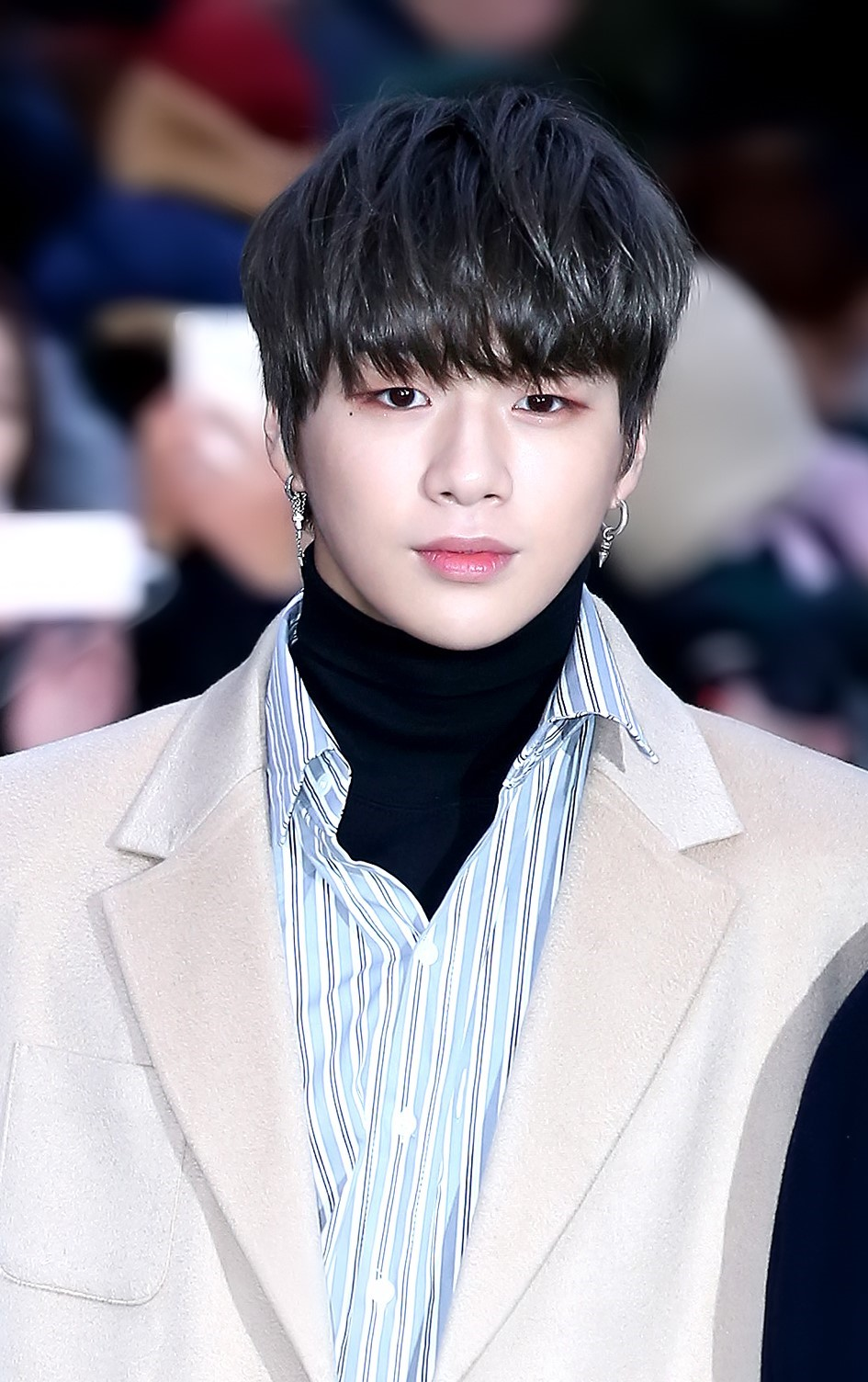
Kang in 2017

This is a videography of South Korean singer-songwriter, actor, television host, and businessman Kang Daniel. He has appeared in 36 music videos — two of which were guest appearances — and one web series titled Rookie Cops (2022) that was released on Star via Disney+. His documentary film titled Kang Daniel: My Parade (2023) follows him through the First Parade world tour with concert footage, behind-the-scenes rehearsals, and candid interviews. His second documentary film Kang Daniel: Hold Your Breath (2026) covers the Act tours.

Following his appearance as the first-place winner of Produce 101 Season 2, Kang was seen on various television shows including It's Dangerous Beyond the Blankets, Master Key, and Law of the Jungle – Pioneers. He has also been featured in several commercials such as those for HiteJinro, Subway Korea, and KT Corporation.

== Music videos ==
=== As lead artist ===
Title	Year	Other performer(s) credited	Director	Ref.
"What Are You Up To" (뭐해)	2019	None	VM Project Architecture	
"Touchin'"	2019	None	FantazyLab	
"Adulthood"	2020	None	Kinotaku	
"2U"	2020	None	VM Project Architecture	
"Refresh"	2020	Zico	Pinklabel Visual	
"Waves"	2020	Simon Dominic; Jamie	VM Project Architecture	
"Who U Are" (깨워)	2020	None	VM Project Architecture	
"Movie"	2020	Dvwn	Kinotaku	
"Paranoia"	2021	None	Rigend Film	
"Paranoia (Performance ver.)"	2021	None	Rigend Film	
"Antidote"	2021	None	Rigend Film	
"Outerspace"	2021	Loco	Segaji Video	
"Ready to Ride"	2022	None	A Hobin Film	
"Upside Down"	2022	None	Wooje Kim (ETUI)	
"Upside Down (Performance ver.)"	2022	None	Wooje Kim (ETUI)	
"Parade"	2022	None	Wasabimayo (Sauce Factory)	
"Move like This"	2022	An Yu-jin; Yuna Kim	Pinklabel Visual	
"How We Live"	2022	Sokodomo	Unknown	
"Don't Tell"	2022	Jessi	Sunny Lee	
"Joy Ride"	2022	None	Nasty Men$ah	
"Nirvana"	2022	pH-1; WDBZ	Rigend Film	
"Look Where We Are"	2023	220 Kid; Willim	Charles Gall	
"Wasteland"	2023	None	A Hobin Film	
"SOS"	2023	None	A Hobin Film	
"SOS (Performance ver.)"	2023	None	A Hobin Film	
"Re8el"	2023	None	Ambience	
"Electric Shock"	2024	None	WASABIMAYO (SAUCE FACTORY)	
"Electric Shock (Performance ver.)"	2024	None	WASABIMAYO (SAUCE FACTORY)	
"Mess"	2025	None	Unknown	
"Episode"	2025	None	Unknown	
"Episode (Performance ver.)"	2025	None	Unknown	
"Backseat Promises"	2025	None	Unknown	

=== As featured artist ===
Title	Year	Performer(s)	Director	Ref.
"State of Wonder"	2021	Inverness; Anthony Russo	Jordan Wozy	
"Hush Hush"	2022	Miyavi	Dyan Jong	

=== Guest appearances ===
Title	Year	Performer(s)	Director	Ref.
"Days Without You" (너 없는 시간들)	2018	Davichi	Kyle	
"I Believe"	2020	Bae Jin-young; Kim Yo-han	Pinklabel Visual	

== Other videos ==
Title	Year	Director	Ref.
[Special Performance] PARANOIA	2021	Sunny Lee	
[Special Performance] Antidote	2021	Sunny Lee	
'The Story' Trailer	2022	Wasabimayo (Sauce Factory)	
Upside Down Lyric Video (English ver.)	2022	Unknown	
TPIR (feat. MIYAVI) Lyric Video	2022	Unknown	
'Parade' on the Kelly Clarkson Show	2022	Wasabimayo (Sauce Factory)	
[Special Performance] Nirvana (Feat. pH-1, WDBZ)	2022	Unknown	

== Video albums ==
=== Live video album ===
Title	Album details	Ref.
Joy Ride Through Japan	Released: March 8, 2023; Label: Warner Music Japan; Formats: Blu-ray	
Kang Daniel: My Parade	Released: October 30, 2023; Label: Konnect; Formats: DVD	

=== Other video albums ===
- Hello, Daniel Travel Story in Portland & LA DVD
- Never Standing Still

== Filmography ==
=== Film ===
Year	English title	Original title	Role	Notes	Ref.
2023	Kang Daniel: My Parade	강다니엘: 마이 퍼레이드	Himself	Documentary	
2026	Kang Daniel: Hold Your Breath	강다니엘: 홀드 유어 브레스	Himself	Documentary	

=== Television ===
Year	English title	Original title	Role	Notes	Ref.
2017	Produce 101 Season 2	프로듀스 101 시즌 2	Contestant	Finished in first place	
2017	It's Dangerous Beyond the Blankets	이불 밖은 위험해	Himself	Season 1, pilot	
2017	Master Key	마스터 키	Himself	Episode 1, 4–10	
2018	It's Dangerous Beyond the Blankets	이불 밖은 위험해	Himself	Season 2	
2018	Living Together in Empty Room	발칙한 동거 – 빈방 있음	Himself	Episode 25–29	
2020	Hello, Daniel	안녕, 다니엘	Himself	Individual reality show	
2021	Law of the Jungle – Pioneers	정글의법칙 – 개척자들	Himself	Episode 438–441	
2022–23	Mr. Trot 2	미스터트롯2	Judge	Trot music competition show	

=== Web series ===
Year	English title	Original title	Role	Notes	Ref.
2022	Rookie Cops	너와 나의 경찰수업	Wi Seung-hyun	Lead role	

=== Web shows ===
Year	English title	Original title	Role	Notes	Ref.
2019	Colorful Daniel	컬러풀 다니엘	Himself	Travelogue, 7 episodes	
2020–24	DaniTV	다니티비	Himself	Konnect content, 54 episodes	
2021	Agent Blackjack K	에이전트 블랙잭 K	Secret Agent K	10 episodes	
2021	K-Pop Evolution		Himself	Docuseries, 7 episodes	
2021	Niel's Camping	녤이캠핑	Himself	7 episodes	
2021	SSAP-DANCE	SSAP-딴스	Himself	6 episodes	
2021	TODAKLISM	토닥리즘	Himself	8 episodes	
2021	DND (Do Not Disturb)	방해금지모드	Himself	8 episodes	
2022	The Birth of Agent Blackjack K	블랙잭K 에이전트의 탄생	Secret Agent K	8 episodes	
2022	Colorful Daniel 2	컬러풀 다니엘 2	Himself	4 episodes	
2022	Top Secret Investigation	극비수사 종방	Secret Agent K	10 episodes	
2022	TODAKLISM: 2nd Story	토닥리즘: 두 번째 이야기	Himself	6 episodes	

=== Radio shows ===
Year	English title	Original title	Role	Notes	Ref.
2019	Kang Daniel Show	강다니엘 Show	Host	Chuseok special	
2021	Kang Daniel Film Festival	강다니엘 영화제	Host	—N/a	
2021	Hello Danity		Host	—N/a	
2022	Daniel School Newsletter	다녤스쿨 가정통신문	Host	—N/a	
2022	Catch Up! Kang Daniel	Catch Up! 강다니엘	Host	—N/a	

=== Hosting ===
Year	English title	Original title	Role	Notes	Ref.
2017	KCON Australia	케이콘 호주	Special MC	with Lee Dae-hwi and Hwang Min-hyun	
2017	Busan One Asia Festival	부산 원아시아페스티벌	Special MC	with Lee Jai-jin	
2017	KBS Song Festival	KBS 가요대축제	Opening and Part II MC	Part II with Solar, Mingyu, and Yerin	
2018	Produce 48	프로듀스 48	Special MC	Episode 1 (with Jeon So-mi)	
2018	Busan One Asia Festival	부산 원아시아페스티벌	Special MC	—N/a	
2019	Happy Together 4	해피투게더 4	Special MC	Episode 59	
2020	Live and Learn	오래 살고 볼일	Special MC	Modeling competition reality show	
2021	Street Woman Fighter	스트릿 우먼 파이터	MC	Dance crew competition show	
2021	MAMA Awards	마마 어워즈	Special MC	MAMA vote fighter	
2021–22	Street Dance Girls Fighter	스트릿댄스 걸스 파이터	MC	Dance crew competition show	
2022	Be the SMF	비더스맨파	MC	Prequel to Street Man Fighter	
2022	Street Man Fighter	스트릿 맨 파이터	MC	Dance crew competition show	
2023	Street Woman Fighter 2	스트릿 우먼 파이터 2	MC	Dance crew competition show	
2023	Street Dance Girls Fighter 2	스트릿댄스 걸스 파이터 2	MC	Dance crew competition show	
2023	8th Asia Artist Awards	아시아 아티스트 어워즈	MC	with Jang Won-young and Sung Han-bin	
2024	Idol Star Athletics Championships	아이돌스타 육상 선수권 대회	MC	with Jun Hyun-moo, Lee Chan-won, Haewon, Jang Minho, Young Tak, and Jeong Dong-won	
2024	Stage Fighter	스테이지 파이터	MC	Dance competition show	

== Exhibition ==
Year	Title	Country	Ref.
2019	Color on Seoul	South Korea	

== Commercials ==
This list does not include commercials that Kang filmed as a part of Wanna One, only sole advertisements.

Company	Year	Promoting	Ref.
Think Nature	2017	Body Lotion	
Think Nature	2018	Natural Care Shampoo and Conditioner	
Think Nature	2018	Himalaya Pink Salt Shampoo and Treatment	
HiteJinro	2018	Hite Extra Cold	
Bokuk Electronics	2018	Airjet Circulator	
LAP Korea	2018	Spring Collection	
LAP Korea	2018	Summer Collection	
LAP Korea	2018	Winter Collection	
Rimowa	2019	Aluminum Original Collection	
Calvin Klein	2019	Calvin Klein Jeans	
Mexicana Chicken	2019	Bburigo Chicken	
Subway Korea	2019	Signature Wraps	
KT Corporation	2019	Samsung Galaxy Note 10 Aura Red	
Givenchy Beauty	2019	2019 Christmas Collection	
Puma Korea	2020	RS-X Cube	
Mexicana Chicken	2020	Buldak Chicken	
Mernel	2021	—N/a	
Mernel	2021	Calming Bell Toner	
Icepray	2021	ICE No. Series	
Mernel	2021	Hand Cream and Lip Essence	
Mexicana Chicken	2021	Sweet Latte Chicken	
Bio Heal	2022	Cica Blemish Cream	
Bio Heal	2022	Probioderm Collection	
Gatorade	2022	2022 Gatorade X Starship Campaign	
The BOIBOY	2022	Porepecial Moisture Black Mask	
SPAO	2023	Lazy Brunch Club	
SPAO	2023	—N/a	
