= Yu Xiaoguang =

Chinese canoeist, swimmer, composer and actor (born 1981)

- 于晓光
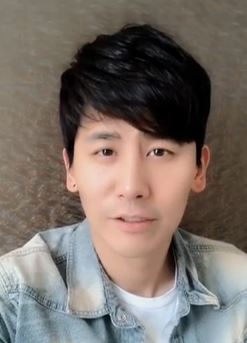
- Yu in 2018
- Born: Yu Liguang (于立桄); May 16, 1981 (age 45); Dandong, Liaoning, China
- Education: Central Academy of Drama; Lee Wei Song School of Music; Wuhan Sports University
- Occupations: Actor, composer
- Years active: 1995–present
- Agents: Beijing Fengchi Huameng Film and Television Media Co., Ltd; BH Entertainment
- Spouse: Choo Ja-hyun (m. 2017)
- Children: 1
- Musical career
- Genres: Mandopop

Chinese name
- Traditional Chinese: 于曉光
- Simplified Chinese: 于晓光
Transcriptions
Standard Mandarin
- Hanyu Pinyin: Yú Xiǎoguāng

Yu Xiaoguang (Chinese: 于晓光; born 16 May 1981), also known as Ethan Yu, is a Chinese composer and actor. Yu is a former swimmer and sprint canoer. In 2006 he made a crossover from sports to films. Yu made appearances on many television series, most notably My Kung Fu Girlfriend (2006), Fighting in Peking (2009), Mao Anying (2010), The Happy Time of the Spicy and Hot Girlfriend (2012), City and Country Life (2014), and Namchow Mechanic Heroes (2015).

== Early life and education ==
Yu was born in Dandong, Liaoning, on May 16, 1981. At the age of 7, he entered a sports school to learn to swim and later became a member of the Liaoning swimming team. In the National Youth Swimming Championships, he won the championship two years (1995 and 1996) in succession. In 1997, he started to learn to canoeing and won the championship in the National Canoeing Championships. After his early retirement, he was accepted to Central Academy of Drama, where he majored in acting. In 2002, he pursued advanced studies in Singapore, he studied music under Lee Wei Song.

== Career ==
Yu had his first experience in front of the camera in 2006, and he was chosen to act as a lead role in My Kung Fu Girlfriend, a comedy television series starring Wang Yang and Ma Su.

In 2007, Yu made his film debut in Crazy in Love, playing Brother Xi. That same year, he co-starred with Yao Chen and Zhang Jiayi in the historical television series Past Events.

In 2008, he appeared in the Game of Life and Death, I'm the Sun and Sailfish Qi yu.

In 2009, Yu portrayed Feng Mu, a writer and critic, in the war television series Fighting in Peking.

Yu portrayed Mao Anying, son of Mao Zedong, in the 2010 biographical drama Mao Anying. That same year, he had key supporting role in Mother, which starred Siqin Gaowa and Song Chunli.

In 2011, two films and one television series he headlined, Wu Yunduo, Beginning of the Great Revival and A Cheng. He played Wu Yunduo, a Chinese ordnance expert during the Second Sino-Japanese War, in the biographical drama Wu Yunduo. He portrayed Liu Shaoqi in China Film Group and DMG Entertainment's production of Huang Jianxin and Han Sanping's Beginning of the Great Revival, alongside Liu Ye, Chen Kun, Li Qin, Huang Jue, and Liao Fan.

Yu starred in the romantic comedy television series The Happy Time of the Spicy and Hot Girlfriend, playing the boyfriend of Choo Ja-hyun's character.

In 2014, Yu portrayed Deng Zhifang, son of Deng Xiaoping, in Deng Xiaoping at History's Crossroads, created by CCTV and directed by Wu Ziniu. The drama received positive reviews and high ratings. That same year, he starred as Man Cang, reuniting him with co-star Che Xiao, who played his girlfriend Jing Mei, in the romantic television series City and Country Life. The series was one of the most watched ones in mainland China in that month.

Yu starred opposite Yu Rongguang, Choo Ja-hyun and Zhu Xiaoyu in 2015 television series Namchow Mechanic Heroes.

In 2017, Yu guest-starred on Billy Chung's Eternal Wave, an action film starring Aaron Kwok, Zanilia Zhao, Zoe Zhang, Zhang Han, and Simon Yam. That same year, he was cast in Hero, playing the son of Siqin Gaowa's and Gao Ming's characters.

== Personal life ==
Yu married Korean actress Choo Ja-hyun on January 18, 2017. They first met while appearing in a Chinese drama The Happy Time of the Spicy and Hot Girlfriend in 2012.

On June 1, 2018, Yu's wife gave birth to a boy at a hospital in Seoul, South Korea.

== Filmography ==
=== Film ===
Year	English title	Chinese title	Role	Notes
2007	Crazy in Love	意乱情迷	Brother Xi	
2008	Sailfish Qi yu	旗鱼	Gao Ming	
2011	Wu Yunduo	吴运铎	Wu Yunduo	
2011	Beginning of the Great Revival	建党伟业	Liu Shaoqi	
2017	Eternal Wave	密战	Big Cat	
2026	Crossing	四渡	City Defense Commander	

=== TV series ===
Year	English title	Chinese title	Role	Notes
2006	My Kung Fu Girlfriend	我的功夫女友	Du Runnan	
2007	Past Events	百年往事	Zhang Xiaolu	
2008	Game of Life and Death	生死博弈	Xiao Ke	
2008	I'm the Sun	我是太阳	Shao Yue	
2009	Fighting in Peking	狼烟北平	Feng Mu	
2009	See A-Lang Again	又见阿郎	Zheng Guyi	
2010	Sword Without Front	利剑无锋	Shen Hao	
2010	Mao Anying	毛岸英	Mao Anying	
2010	Mother	娘	Man Cang	
2011	A Cheng	阿诚	Jiang Haisheng	
2012	The Happy Time of the Spicy and Hot Girlfriend	麻辣女友的幸福时光	Luo Yin	
2012	—N/a	鹰巢之预备警官	Jin Rui	
2012	—N/a	一门三司令	Yang Tianhong	
2014	Deng Xiaoping at History's Crossroads	历史转折中的邓小平	Deng Zhifang	
2014	City and Country Life	满仓进城	Man Cang	
2014	Moving Muzzle	移动的枪口	Lu Tianhong	
2015	Beautiful Village Girl	美丽村姑	Ding Zhun	
2015	Namchow Mechanic Heroes	南侨机工英雄传	Fang Tianhai	
2015	Storm over Ordos	鄂尔多斯风暴	Ta La	
2016	Ultimate Mission	终极使命	Gao Han	
2017	Soma Flowers	索玛花开	Mu Xia	
2017	Hero	英雄烈	Liang Tianci	
2017	Her	咱家	Guo Hu	
2017	The Dream is Getting Closer	梦想越走越近	Zhao Jiaping	
2017	The Wolf Warriors	百战天狼	Ma Gaitian	
2018	About Time	멈추고 싶은 순간: 어바웃타임	Zhang Qiang	

=== Drama ===
Year	English title	Chinese title	Role	Notes
2013	Mao Zedong and His Elder Son	毛泽东和他的长子	Mao Anying	

=== Music video appearances ===
Year	English title	Chinese title	Singer	Notes
2003	Hope	希望		
2005	When You Want to Know Who Alone	孤独时候你想谁呢	Yaya Meng	
2006	Message Board	留言信箱	Huang Yue	

=== Variety show ===
Year	English title	Original title	Television	Notes
1 December 2010	Art Life	艺术人生	CCTV-3	
6 August 2011	China Feelings	中华情	CCTV-4	
1 September 2011	Avenue of Stars	星光大道	CCTV-1	
25 February 2012	The Eight Immortals Crossing the Sea: Happy New Year	八仙过海闹新春	CCTV-8	
9 August 2012	Best Live	最佳现场	BTV	
22 November 2012	Fashionable Tourism	时尚旅游	Qinghai Television	
1 May 2013	Thank God You are Coming	谢天谢地你来啦	CCTV-1	
20 November 2013	The Most Unusual National Opera Fan	最炫国剧风	Shandong Television	
16 December 2013	I Love My Family	我爱我家	BTV	
1 September 2014	Film and Television Drama	影视风云	BTV	
14 February 2015	A Letter to Home	一封家书	Shandong Television	
12 March 2016	Family and Children	家游好儿女	Shandong Television	
26 March 2017	Super Sound Wave	超强音浪	Shandong Television	
10 July 2017	Same Bed, Different Dreams 2: You Are My Destiny	동상이몽 2 – 너는 내 운명	SBS	

== Music (as composer) ==
Year	English title	Chinese title	Singer	Notes
2006	I Find Happiness That Year	找到幸褔那年	Tarcy Su	
2006	Love is Never Wrong	爱一个人没错	Sun Ho	
2006	7-27	7-27	Maggie Teng	
2007	The Plight We Made	我们说好的	Jane Zhang	with Lee Wei Song.
2007	Secret Love	暗恋	Huang Xiaoming	
2007	Scorpio Lover	天蝎情人	Huang Xiaoming	
2008	Out of Tune	走音	Wong Jinglun	
2008	Experimenting	试验品	Stephen Fung	
2009	Blue Sky	天空蓝	Pace Wu	
2009	Ban	伴	Tiger Huang	
2011	Occasionally Ordinary	偶尔平凡	Hacken Lee	with Lee Wei Song.

== Awards and nominations ==
Year	Award	Category	Nominated work	Result	Notes
2017	SBS Entertainment Awards	Hot Star of the Year	Same Bed, Different Dreams 2: You Are My Destiny	Won	with Choo Ja-hyun
