= Type 909 weapon trials ship =

Type of naval ship

Class overview
- Builders: Zhongua Shipyard; Hudong–Zhonghua Shipbuilding
- Operators: People's Liberation Army Navy
- Built: 1997 - 2014
- Completed: 4
- Active: 4

General characteristics
- Type: Oceanographic research ships; Weapon trial ships
- Displacement: 6,096 tonnes (full)
- Length: 130 m (426 ft 6 in)
- Beam: 17.5 m (57 ft 5 in)
- Draught: 7 m (23 ft 0 in)
- Propulsion: 2 diesel engines; 2 shafts
- Speed: 20 knots (37 km/h; 23 mph)
- Complement: 80
- Aircraft carried: 1 medium helicopter (891)
- Aviation facilities: Helicopter pad (891)

The Type 909 (NATO reporting name: Dahua) is a class of Chinese auxiliary ship. Four were built for the People's Liberation Army Navy (PLAN) as weapon trial and oceanographic research ships.

== History ==
The first ship, Bi Sheng, was completed as a weapons test range ship with Russian MR-90 "Front Dome" radar and electronic countermeasures. It operated as an electronic intelligence ship near Japan in February 2000 prior to PLAN exercises. Bi Sheng was converted into a weapon trial ship at the Wuhu shipyard, and received pennant number 891 in October 2002; while at the shipyard the hull was designated "Wuhu-B" by Western intelligence. Bi Sheng was equipped with "Top Plate" air search radar and "Front Dome" fire control radar and may have test fired the CJ-10 land-attack cruise missile in August 2012.

The design of the third ship, Zhan Tianyou, may have been a modified Type 636 hydrographic survey ship. It had a raised bow breakwater and an enclosed, instead of a lattice, foremast.

According to the International Institute for Strategic Studies, by 2024 two were used as weapon trial ships and two were oceanographic research ships.

== Designation ==
In 2015, Janes listed Zhan Tianyou and Li Siguang as Type 909s. By 2024, the United States Navy considered these ships to be Type 910 weapon trials ships.

== Ships of class ==
| Pennant number | Name | Builder | Laid down | Launched | Commissioned | Fleet | Status | Notes |
|---|---|---|---|---|---|---|---|---|
| 851 | Bi Sheng | Zhongua Shipyard | | March 9, 1997 | | North Sea Fleet | Active | Launched with pennant number 909 and completed as 970. Pennant changed to 891 in October 2002. |
| 852 | Hua Luogeng | Hudong–Zhonghua Shipbuilding | | March 30, 2006 | | North Sea Fleet | Active | Former pennant number 892. |
| 893 | Zhan Tianyou | | | November 12, 2011 | | North Sea Fleet | Active | |
| 894 | Li Siguang | | 2012 | November 2013 | October 2014 | North Sea Fleet | Active | |
