= Same Bed, Different Dreams 2: You Are My Destiny =

- Poster
- Genre: Variety; Talk show
- Presented by: Kim Gura; Seo Jang-hoon; Kim Sook
- Country of origin: South Korea
- Original language: Korean
- No. of episodes: 418(15,2025)

Production
- Producers: Seo Hye-jin; Ahn Jae-chul
- Camera setup: Multiple-camera setup
- Running time: 80 minutes
- Production company: SM C&C

Original release
- Network: SBS TV
- Release: 10 July 2017 – present

Same Bed, Different Dreams 2 - You Are My Destiny (Korean: 동상이몽 2 - 너는 내 운명) is a South Korean television entertainment program, distributed and syndicated by SBS. It is the second season of the show Same Bed, Different Dreams which underwent a format change, now focusing on the life of celebrity couples.

== Main MC ==
- Kim Gura
- Seo Jang-hoon
- Kim Sook

== Special MC ==
Name	Episode(s)
Yang Se-hyung	3
Jang Yun-jeong	4
Seo Min-jung	5
Baek Ji-young	6
So Yoo-jin	7–8
Shin Da-eun	9
Hong Jin-young	10
Sunny	10
Park Na-rae	13
Jeong Jun-ha	14
Sayuri Fujita	14
Yoo Seo-jin	15–16
Sean	17
Kim Sung-kyun	18
Lee Mi-do	19
Zico	20
So Yi-hyun	21–22
Park Jin-hee	23–24
Oh Ji-ho	25–26
Song Jae-rim	27
Kim So-young	28
Park Si-eun	39
Kim Ho-young (actor)	30
Park Sun-young	31–32
Joon Park	33–34
Han Ji-hye	35–36
Kim Jong-min	37–38
Lee Soon-jae	39
Kim Joon-hyun	40
Han Go-eun	41–42
Jang Young-nam	43–44
Ji Sang-ryeol	45
Choi Eun-kyung	46
Park Jung-ah	46
Ryu Seung-soo	47
Lena Park	48–49
Jang Yoon-joo	50–51
Haha	52–53
Jo Hyun-jae	54–55
Noh Sa-yeon	56–57
Lee Jae-ryong	58–59
Park Ji-young	60–61
Kim Kwang-kyu	62–63
So Chan-whee	64
Jung Ae-youn	65
Hong Yoon-hwa	66
Yang Dong-geun	67
Choi Jung-won	68
Son Ji-chang	69
Yoon Hae-young	70-71
Jung Gyu Woon	72
Byul	73
Jang Shin-young	74-75
Ryu Soo-young	76-77
Yoo Ho-jeong	78-79
Alex	80
In Gyo-jin	81-82
Kim Eana	83
Shin Sung-woo	84
Kim Won-jun	85
Lee Soo-young	86
Kim Tae-won	87
Park Hyo-joo	97

== Couples ==
=== Current couples ===
- Lee Ji-hye & Moon Jae-wan (episode 192-225, 230, 243-present)
- Lee Hyun-yi & Hong Seong-ki (episode 211–present)
- Oh Sang-jin & Kim So-young (episode 265–present)
- Lee Jang-won & Bae Da-hae (episode 279–present)
- Park Goon & Han Ji-young (episode 280–present)
- Joo Woo-jong & Jung Da-eun (episode 306–present)
- Lady Jane & Lim Hyun-tae (episode 310-present)
- Son Beom-su & Jin Yang-hye (episode 314-present)
- Mithra Jin & Kwon Da-hyun (episode 316–present)
- Ahn Se-ha & Jeon Eun-ji (episode 320–present)
- VJ Charles & Han Go-woon (episode 322-present)
- Yoon Jin-yi & Kim Tae-geun (episode 332-present)
- Oh Jun-tae & Baek A-young (episode 334-present)
- Hwang Youn-jin & Kim Da-som (episode 340-present)
- Kim Kiri & Moon Ji-in (episode 342–present)

=== Former couples ===
- Kim Hea Kyung & Lee Jae Myung (episode 1–11)
- Kim Ji-na & Kim Soo-yong (episode 1–7)
- Lee Ji-ae & Kim Jung-geun (episode 3–12)
- Choo Ja-hyun & Yu Xiaoguang (episode 1–38,100-101,300-301)
- Myung Seo-hyun & Jong Tae-se (episode 14–44)
- Noh Sa-yeon & Lee Moo-seong (episode 39–48)
- Shin Da-eun & Im Seong-bin (episode 46–53)
- Choi Ji-yeon & Son Byong-ho (episode 54–61)
- Ryu Seung-soo & Yoon Hye-won (episode 62–77)
- Han Go-eun & Shin Young-soo (episode 56–80, 102–103)
- Choi Min-soo & June Kang (episode 81–83, 88–92)
- Jung Gyu Woon & Kim Woo Rim (episode 81–87)
- Rhymer & Ahn Hyun-mo (episode 78–89, 93–99)
- Shin Dong-mi & Heo Gyu (episode 91–101, 104–107, 110)
- So Yi-hyun & In Gyo-jin (episode 31–115)
- Yoon Sang-hyun & MayBee (episode 85–119)
- Jo Hyun-jae & Park Min-jung (episode 104–122)
- Ha Hee-ra & Choi Soo-jong (episode 30–36, 117–128)
- Lee Yoon-ji & Jeong Han-Wool (episode 123–139)
- Cho Choong-hyun & Kim Min-jung (episode 140–141)
- Kangnam & Lee Sang-hwa (episode 114–143)
- Jin Tae-hyun & Park Si-eun (episode 129–150, 254–256, 277)
- Ha Jae-sook & Lee Joon-haeng (episode 142–149, 208–209)
- Jang Shin-young & Kang Kyung-joon (episode 11–29, 48–55, 103, 160–167)
- Park Sung-kwang & Lee Sol-yi (episode 144–198, 224, 228, 266)
- Chan Sung Jung & Park Seon-young (episode 148–175)
- Song Chang-eui & Oh Ji-young (episode 155–193)
- Kim Jae-woo & Cho Yu-ri (episode 156–164)
- Jun Jin & Ryu Yi-seo (episode 165–207, 259)
- Oh Ji-ho & Eun Bo-ah (episode 169–206)
- Mihal Ashminov & Park Eun-hee (episode 186–193)
- Jung Jo-gook & Kim Sung-eun (episode 194–210, 228)
- Lee Ji-hoon & Ayane Miura (episode 204–222)
- Kim Yoon-ji & Choi Woo-sung (episode 220–238, 258, 339)
- Ahn Chang-hwan & Jang Hee-jung (episode 230–241)
- Son Dam-bi & Lee Kyou-hyuk (episode 245–256)
- Andy Lee & Lee Eun-joo (episode 250–264)
- Giant Pink & Han Dong-hoon (episode 234–242, 259-261, 297)
- Im Chang-jung & Seo Ha-yan (episode 239–276)
- Lee Ahyumi & Kwon Ki-bum (episode 269–278)
- Wang Ji-won & Park Jong-suk (episode 283–291)
- Lee Da-hae & Seven (episode 292–293)
- Kim Jung-hwa & Yoo Eun-sung (episode 286–295)
- Choi Byung-mo & Lee Gyu-in (episode 294–295, 303, 313)
- Jung Yi-rang & Kim Hyung-geun (episode 304-313)

== Guests ==
- Kim Saeng-min (episode 2)
- Han Suk-joon (episode 10)
- Kim Ho-Young (episode 30)

== Ratings ==
In the table below, the blue numbers represent the lowest ratings and the red numbers represent the highest ratings.

=== 2017 ===
List of ratings in 2017 (episodes 1 – 25)

Episode #	Broadcast Date	TNmS Ratings	AGB Ratings
1	10 July	4.8%	5.5%
1	10 July	5.6%	7.0%
2	17 July	4.8%	4.5%
2	17 July	5.8%	5.8%
3	24 July	5.9%	7.2%
3	24 July	6.3%	8.2%
4	31 July	5.6%	8.1%
4	31 July	6.0%	9.9%
5	7 August	5.9%	7.7%
5	7 August	6.2%	8.6%
6	14 August	6.2%	8.0%
6	14 August	8.0%	9.8%
7	21 August	6.9%	9.1%
7	21 August	7.4%	9.8%
8	28 August	7.1%	8.6%
8	28 August	8.1%	9.5%
9	4 September	7.2%	7.9%
9	4 September	8.0%	8.5%
10	11 September	7.5%	8.6%
10	11 September	7.8%	8.6%
11	18 September	7.8%	7.8%
11	18 September	8.2%	8.0%
12	25 September	7.0%	8.4%
12	25 September	7.7%	8.7%
13	2 October	8.0%	8.4%
13	2 October	8.8%	9.7%
14	9 October	8.8%	8.7%
14	9 October	9.3%	9.9%
15	16 October	7.9%	7.0%
15	16 October	8.4%	8.0%
16	23 October	7.5%	8.1%
16	23 October	7.8%	8.9%
17	30 October	6.3%	6.8%
17	30 October	7.7%	9.0%
18	6 November	8.2%	8.6%
18	6 November	8.8%	8.9%
19	13 November	8.2%	9.7%
19	13 November	8.7%	9.9%
20	20 November	7.3%	9.1%
20	20 November	8.3%	10.1%
21	27 November	7.7%	8.8%
21	27 November	8.2%	9.0%
22	4 December	7.9%	8.9%
22	4 December	8.6%	9.3%
23	11 December	7.5%	9.0%
23	11 December	8.3%	9.8%
24	18 December	7.5%	8.7%
24	18 December	7.0%	9.4%
25	25 December	7.9%	9.5%
25	25 December	8.0%	9.5%

=== 2018 ===
List of ratings in 2018 (episodes 26 – 126)

Episode #	Broadcast Date	TNmS Ratings	AGB Ratings
26	1 January	8.2%	10.2%
26	1 January	8.5%	10.6%
27	8 January	9.0%	9.1%
27	8 January	9.9%	10.1%
28	15 January	7.6%	7.8%
28	15 January	8.0%	8.5%
29	22 January	7.4%	8.8%
29	22 January	7.5%	9.9%
30	29 January	9.1%	11.1%
30	29 January	9.5%	11.4%
31	5 February	9.7%	11.0%
31	5 February	9.8%	11.6%
32	12 February	9.5%	11.0%
32	12 February	10.7%	12.1%
33	19 February	7.7%	9.6%
33	19 February	9.0%	9.8%
34	26 February	8.9%	9.0%
34	26 February	9.2%	9.6%
35	5 March	8.9%	9.8%
35	5 March	9.2%	9.9%
36	12 March	7.5%	7.8%
36	12 March	8.3%	8.4%
37	19 March	8.5%	7.5%
37	19 March	7.9%	7.9%
38	26 March	7.6%	9.3%
38	26 March	7.7%	10.1%
39	2 April	8.3%	9.1%
39	2 April	8.9%	10.5%
40	9 April	8.1%	8.7%
40	9 April	8.1%	9.2%
41	16 April	7.1%	7.7%
41	16 April	7.1%	8.1%
42	23 April	6.5%	7.5%
42	23 April	6.8%	8.1%
43	30 April	5.6%	6.7%
43	30 April	5.7%	6.8%
44	7 May	6.4%	6.2%
44	7 May	6.8%	6.5%
45	14 May	6.3%	6.1%
45	14 May	5.9%	5.7%
46	21 May	5.6%	6.4%
46	21 May	6.4%	7.0%
47	28 May	6.7%	6.7%
47	28 May	7.0%	7.7%
48	11 June	7.0%	7.2%
48	11 June	7.2%	7.3%
49	18 June	6.5%	7.4%
49	18 June	7.6%	8.8%
50	25 June	6.0%	6.3%
50	25 June	6.6%	6.7%

Episode #	Broadcast Date	TNmS Ratings	AGB Ratings
51	2 July	4.8%	5.3%
51	2 July	6.7%	7.7%
52	9 July	6.7%	7.3%
52	9 July	8.1%	8.6%
53	16 July	6.3%	5.9%
53	16 July	6.6%	5.6%
54	23 July	6.3%	6.6%
54	23 July	7.1%	7.3%
55	30 July	6.2%	6.5%
55	30 July	8.6%	7.3%
56	6 August	7.6%	6.9%
56	6 August	8.8%	7.8%
57	13 August	7.3%	6.1%
57	13 August	7.9%	7.1%
58	20 August	7.5%	6.9%
58	20 August	8.7%	7.6%
59	27 August	7.0%	6.8%
59	27 August	7.4%	6.9%
60	3 September	6.9%	6.4%
60	3 September	7.4%	7.0%
61	10 September	N/R	7.5%
61	10 September	N/R	7.5%
61	17 September	N/R	6.4%
61	17 September	N/R	6.2%
62	24 September	N/R	6.1%
62	24 September	N/R	6.3%
63	1 October	N/R	6.6%
63	1 October	N/R	7.4%
64	8 October	N/R	6.7%
64	8 October	N/R	7.4%
65	15 October	N/R	6.1%
65	15 October	N/R	5.8%

== Awards and nominations ==
Name of the award ceremony, year presented, award category, nominee(s) of the award, and the result of the nomination
Award ceremony	Year	Category	Nominee(s)	Result	Ref.
SBS Entertainment Awards	2017	Top Excellence Award in Show/Talk Category	Seo Jang-hoon	Won	
SBS Entertainment Awards	2017	Excellence Award in Show/Talk Category	Kim Sook	Nominated	
SBS Entertainment Awards	2017	Hot Star of the Year	Yu Xiaoguang and Choo Ja-hyun	Won	
SBS Entertainment Awards	2017	Best Couple Award	Kim Gu-ra and Seo Jang-hoon	Nominated	
SBS Entertainment Awards	2017	Scriptwriter of the Year	Noh Yoon	Won	
SBS Entertainment Awards	2018	Best MC Award	Kim Sook	Won	
SBS Entertainment Awards	2018	Excellence Award in Show/Talk Category	So Yi-hyun	Won	
SBS Entertainment Awards	2018	Best Family Award	In Gyo-jin & So Yi-hyun	Won	
SBS Entertainment Awards	2018	Best Couple Award	Kim Gu-ra and Seo Jang-hoon	Nominated	
SBS Entertainment Awards	2019	Excellence Award in Reality Category	Yoon Sang-hyun	Won	
SBS Entertainment Awards	2019	Excellence Program Award in Reality Category	Same Bed, Different Dreams 2: You Are My Destiny	Won	
SBS Entertainment Awards	2019	Scriptwriter of the Year	Kim Mi-kyung	Won	
SBS Entertainment Awards	2019	SNS Star Award	Kangnam and Lee Sang-hwa	Won	
SBS Entertainment Awards	2019	Best Family Award	Lee Yoon-ji	Won	
SBS Entertainment Awards	2020	Best Teamwork Award	Same Bed, Different Dreams 2: You Are My Destiny Team	Won	
SBS Entertainment Awards	2020	Special Award: SBS Honorary Employee Award	Seo Jang-hoon	Won	
