= BH Entertainment =

South Korean actors agency

- Native name: 비에이치엔터테인먼트
- Type: Private
- Industry: Entertainment
- Founded: June 2, 2006; 20 years ago
- Founder: Lee Byung-hun; Son Seok-woo
- Headquarters: 35 Nonhyeon-ro 142-gil, Gangnam-gu, Seoul, South Korea
- Area served: Asia
- Key people: Son Seok-woo (CEO, President)
- Services: Actors Management
- Owner: Kakao Entertainment
- Parent: Kakao Entertainment
- Website: bhent.co.kr

BH Entertainment (Korean: 비에이치엔터테인먼트) is a South Korean entertainment agency founded by actor Lee Byung-hun and his long-time manager, Son Seok-woo, in 2006. Initially established as a one-man agency for the management of Lee's activities, the company has since grown to manage many actors throughout Asia.

Since 2018, BH Entertainment has been operating as a subsidiary of Kakao Entertainment. The company is home to many prominent actors in the South Korean entertainment industry, including Lee Byung-hun, Han Hyo-joo, Han Ga-in, Han Ji-min, Park Hae-soo, Lee Ji-ah, Kim Go-eun, Ahn So-hee, Lee Jin-wook, Park Jin-young, and Park Bo-young.

== History ==
=== 2006–2007: Formation ===
Prior to the establishment of BH Entertainment, actor Lee Byung-hun was under the agency Player Entertainment. During this time, his popularity had spread throughout Asia and he frequently had activities overseas, particularly in Japan. On July 18, 2005, Player Entertainment was fully acquired by Phantom Entertainment Group, which transferred Lee's management to them. Despite being under one of the top management agencies at the time, it was reported that Lee was dissatisfied with their management of his activities both within South Korea and overseas.

In 2006, nearing the end of his exclusive contract with Phantom and desiring more liberty in decisions regarding his activities, Lee founded BH Entertainment with his long-time manager and former director of Player Entertainment, Son Seok-woo, who was appointed CEO. Son had been working as Lee's manager since late 2001 and is widely credited for helping Lee achieve Hallyu star status. The company's name derives from the initials of Lee's first name, but is also now synonymous with the company's motto "Be Happy". Lee invested ₩400–500 million in annual operating expenses for the company. In calculating the costs of starting his own agency, Lee determined that there would be no loss in his investment as he would have to give ₩500 million (or 20% of his annual income of ₩2.5 billion) regardless if he were signed to a large entertainment agency. The company started out hiring five employees for Lee's management, including accounting, marketing and PR experts, domestic and international agents, and field managers. Among them was Song Wan-mo, who was appointed vice president of BH Entertainment and Lee's international agent. Song had been in charge of Lee's activities in Japan since 2002.

By early 2007, it was widely reported that Lee would be leaving Phantom with the expiration of his exclusive contract and by March 2007, Lee's activities were being conveyed through BH Entertainment.

Soon after, BH Entertainment began their expansion to the management of other artists. In April 2007, South Korean-American actress and model Ursula Mayes signed a contract for the management of her South Korea and Asia activities with BH Entertainment as the first artist alongside Lee Byung-hun at the company. That same year, Vantage Holdings acquired shares in BH Entertainment in addition to entertainment agency, Byulnan Actors.

=== 2008–2017: Expansion ===
In 2008, BH Entertainment merged with Byulnan Actors, transferring the management of other actors to the company, including Han Chae-young, Jin Goo, and Bae Soo-bin. This expanded the company's management to approximately ten celebrities. Alongside this, the company was actively scouting for new artists to sign, such as Hyun Jyu-ni and Hong Ah-reum.

In 2009, BH Entertainment would begin to establish itself as an agency housing top stars with the success of its current artists and by signing exclusive contracts with popular actress Kim Min-hee, who was gaining traction overseas, and then-rising actress Han Hyo-joo.

In 2011, CEO Son Seok-woo discussed BH Entertainment's rapid success, emphasising a customised management system for their artists' individual needs. He cited the company's current plans to not exceed the management of ten artists in ensuring quality over quantity in their specialised management of their actors.

On November 6, 2011, Apex Law Firm announced that they had signed a legal advisory contract with BH Entertainment.

On September 24, 2012, BH Entertainment announced that they would be producing the stage play adaptation of Lee Byung-hun's recently released film Masquerade, with it set to open on February 23, 2013, at Dongsoong Art Center's Dongsoong Hall in Seoul. This marked the company's first production project. Later that year, BH Entertainment secured their highest profile artist yet, signing an exclusive contract with actress Han Ga-in, who was being highly sought out by numerous entertainment agencies with the expiration of her previous agency's contract. The company would continue to acquire many in-demand and notable celebrities, including Han Ji-min and former Wonder Girls member Ahn So-hee.

In 2014, concerns about the state of the company's future began to arise with the company seemingly being unable to retain its artists through contract renewals. This was exacerbated with comparisons to actor Bae Yong-joon's KeyEast, who was finding success in contract renewals with its top stars. Many notable actors had left BH Entertainment at the expiration of their contracts, including Han Chae-young, Go Soo, Kim Min-hee, and Ahn So-hee. Fortunately, they were able to maintain top actresses Han Hyo-joo, Han Ga-in, and Han Ji-min, alleviating looming concerns about the company's management. Artists who had previously left the company, Go Soo and Ahn So-hee, would eventually re-sign with the company.

In 2017, BH Entertainment would focus on expanding their management to artists from other Asian countries. On September 27, 2017, they announced that they had signed an exclusive contract with Yu Xiaoguang, their first Chinese artist. The following month, they signed a contract with their first Japanese artist, Erika Karata. That same year, BH Entertainment signed a content production agreement with Sony Pictures Television for the United States and Asia. From the agreement, BH Entertainment stated plans to partake in active content businesses through its collaboration with Sony Pictures Television, such as remakes of works between the two countries and producing original dramas in the overseas content market. This agreement was set to make BH Entertainment a key player in the domestic and international media industry and help them make active and aggressive global advancements as a company.

=== 2018–present: Kakao M acquisition ===
On June 27, 2018, Kakao M announced that they had acquired 30% of BH Entertainment's shares. By January 2019, Kakao M had completed its full acquisition of BH Entertainment.

On November 12, 2019, BH Entertainment announced that they would be purchasing a new office building in Nonhyeon-dong worth approximately ₩7.4 billion for their headquarters. For the purchase, they conducted a paid-in capital increase by issuing 14,815 new shares. While Kakao M injected ₩4 billion into the company for the building purchase, BH Entertainment stated that the amount would be allocated to facility funds and that they were planning to use all of the funds raised through the capital increase to purchase the new building.

In 2021, with the merger of Kakao M and KakaoPage into Kakao Entertainment, BH Entertainment became a subsidiary of Kakao M's division at Kakao Entertainment, M Company.

In 2022, BH Entertainment co-produced the Netflix series Money Heist: Korea – Joint Economic Area with Zium Content (now High-Zium Studio). In 2023, they co-produced the film Concrete Utopia with Climax Studio.

== Artists ==
=== Actors ===
- Lee Byung-hun (2007–present)
- Sean Richard Dulake (2010–present)
- Lee Hee-joon (2014–present)
- Park Hae-soo (2016–present)
- Park Sung-hoon (2016–present)
- Yu Xiaoguang (2017–present)
- Lee Jin-wook (2019–present)
- Joo Jong-hyuk (2020–present)
- Kil Eun-sung (2020–present)
- Park Jin-young (2021–present)
- Jang Dong-yoon (2024–present)
- Jo Beom-gyu (2024–present)
- Kim Min-kyu (2026–present)
- Gong Myung (2026–present)

=== Actresses ===
- Han Hyo-joo (2009–present)
- Han Ga-in (2012–present)
- Han Ji-min (2013–present)
- Ahn So-hee (2014–2015; 2018–present)
- Choo Ja-hyun (2016–present)
- Lee Ji-ah (2016–present)
- Kim Go-eun (2017–present)
- Erika Karata (2017–present)
- Park Ji-hu (2019–present)
- Park Bo-young (2020–present)
- Jung Chae-yeon (2022–present)
- Cho Hye-jung (2022–present)
- Park Yu-rim (2022–present)
- Hong Hwa-yeon (2022–present)
- Park Seo-kyung (2023–present)
- Keum Sae-rok (2024–present)
- Jeon So-young (2024–present)
- Jung Ho-yeon (2025–present)
- Kim Se-jeong (2026–present)

== Former artists ==
- Ursula Mayes (2007)
- Kim Hyung-jong (2008 (Note: Management transferred from Byulnan Actors)–2009)
- Kim Jung-heon (2008–2011)
- Kim Min-hee (2009–2012)
- Song Ha-yoon (2008–2013)
- Han Chae-young (2008–2013)
- Hong Ah-reum (2008–2014)
- Lim Hwa-young (2013–2015)
- Lee Won-keun (2012–2015)
- Ha Yeon-soo (2012–2015)
- Shim Eun-kyung (2013–2015)
- Dong Ha (as Kim Hyung-gyu) (2012–2016)
- Bae Soo-bin (2008–2017)
- Hyun Jyu-ni (2008–2017)
- Jang Young-nam (2016–2018)
- Heo Jung-do (2016–2018)
- Yang Ik-june (2018–2019)
- Byeon Woo-seok (2017–2020)
- Park Jung-woo (2018–2020)
- Gong Seung-yeon (2018–2020)
- Jin Goo (2008–2020)
- Kim Yong-ji (2017–2021)
- Yoo Ji-tae (2018–2025)
- Kim Eun-ho (2024–2026)
- Jung Woo (2019–2026)
- Kim Si-a (2024–2026)
- Jo Bok-rae (2019–2026)
- Go Soo (2011–2015; 2017–2026)

== Production ==
=== Released ===
Release date	Title	Media format	Notes	Ref.
February 23–April 21, 2013	Masquerade	Stage	Performed at Dongsoong Hall (Dongsoong Art Center), Seoul	
February 22, 2017	A Single Rider	Film	co-production with Perfect Storm Films; distributed by Warner Bros. and M-Line Distribution	
June 24–December 9, 2022	Money Heist: Korea – Joint Economic Area	Television	co-production with Zium Content; distributed by Netflix	
August 9, 2023	Concrete Utopia	Film	co-production with Climax Studios; distributed by Lotte Entertainment	
March 26, 2025	The Match	Film	co-production with Moonlight Film Company; theatrically distributed by BY4M Studio, followed by streaming on Netflix	
