= Choo Ja-hyun =

South Korean actress (born 1979)

- 추자현
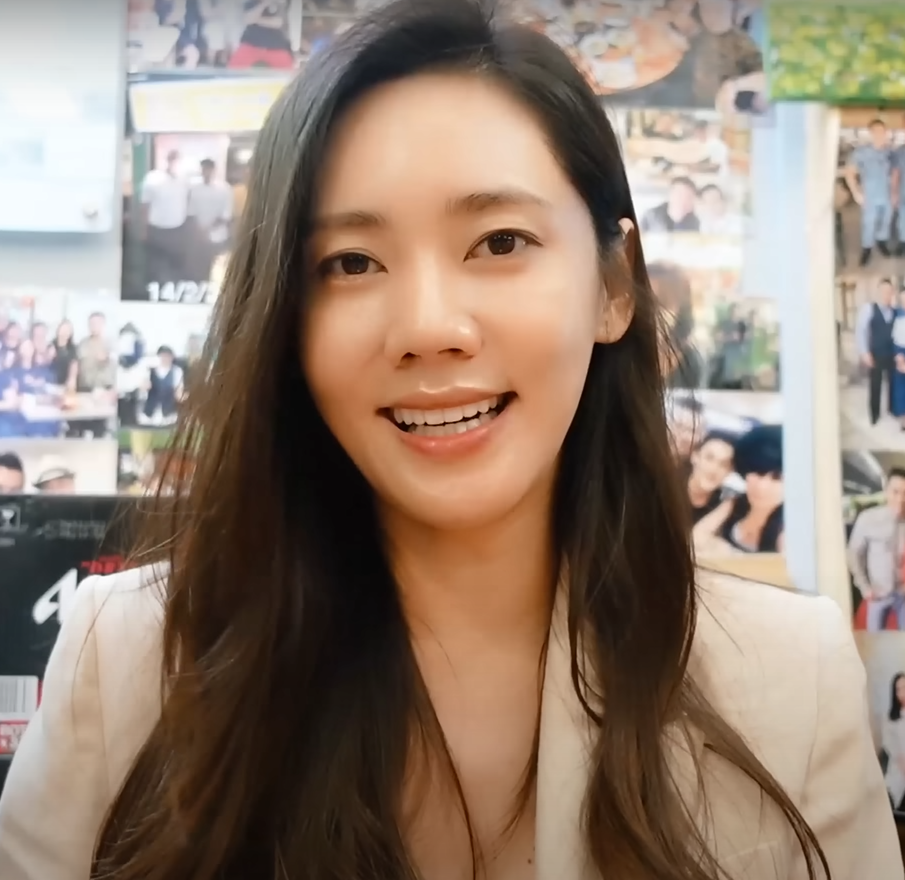
- Choo in 2022
- Born: Chu Eun-ju; January 20, 1979 (age 47); Bisan-dong, Seo District, Daegu, South Korea
- Other name: Qiu Cixuan
- Citizenship: South Korea
- Education: Dankook University
- Occupation: Actress
- Years active: 1996–present
- Agent(s): BH Entertainment (South Korea); Guangdong CHS Media (China)
- Spouse: Yu Xiaoguang (m. 2017)
- Children: 1

Korean name
- Hangul: 추은주
- RR: Chu Eunju
- MR: Ch'u Ŭnju

Stage name
- Hangul: 추자현
- RR: Chu Jahyeon
- MR: Ch'u Chahyŏn

Chu Eun-ju (Korean: 추은주; born January 20, 1979), known by her stage name Choo Ja-hyun (추자현), is a South Korean actress. Best known in Korea for the films Bloody Tie (2006) and Portrait of a Beauty (2008), Choo has also actively worked in China since 2007, notably in television drama The Temptation to Go Home (2011, remake of Temptation of Wife).

== Early life ==
Chu Eun-ju was born and raised in Daegu, the then-capital of North Gyeongsang Province. The only daughter of a cosmetologist and a white-collar worker, her parents divorced when she was 18 years old. She also revealed on a Chinese TV show that she had a little sister who died by drowning when they were younger. Choo graduated from Dankook University, with a bachelor's degree in Theater and Film.

== Career ==
=== South Korea ===
Using the stage name Choo Ja-hyun, she began her entertainment career as a model at age 17. She made her acting debut in 1996, and went on to appear in several television series, among them Successful Story of a Bright Girl (2002), Sunrise House (2002), and Apgujeong House (2003).

Then after a decade in relative obscurity, Choo drew critical acclaim in 2006 for her portrayal of a ravaged drug addict in Bloody Tie, a film noir about the meth trade in 1990s Busan. She won acting recognition from the Grand Bell Awards, the Korean Film Awards, and the Director's Cut Awards, as well as nominations from the Blue Dragon Film Awards and the Baeksang Arts Awards.

She was then cast in the erotic period drama Portrait of a Beauty, based on Lee Jung-myung's novel Painter of the Wind which reimagined Joseon artist Shin Yun-bok as a woman disguised as a man. Portrait of a Beauty became the 8th best-selling Korean film of 2008, and Choo again received supporting actress nominations for playing a gisaeng who entertains noblemen by performing dances and poetry readings.

This was followed by Missing (2009), a slasher film in which Choo's character is determined to find her younger sister, who's been abducted by a psychopath farmer who rapes and murders young women.

She starred in Loveholic in 2010, a character-driven romance drama directed by Kwon Chil-in. Choo played a self-destructive woman with a drinking problem and professional crises; she goes to stay at her friend's house until she sorts out her life, then has an affair with the latter's cuckolded husband.

Choo next appeared in The Famished, a 27-minute short film about stage actors who eat their own memories to satisfy their hunger; it was included in the omnibus Short! Short! Short! 2010: Fantastic Theater.

=== Taiwan and China ===
Choo had begun building her pan-Asian profile when she appeared in the 2003 Taiwanese drama Scent of Love, which ranked number one in the ratings when it aired in Taiwan.

Despite almost a decade of acting experience in her homeland, Choo later said she decided to launch her career in China for practical reasons, "I did not have a choice (but to debut in China). Acting is my trade, and I have to act to make a living, but in Korea the work was not steady enough for a stable income." She was cast as Du Chun's leading lady in The Legend of the Banner Hero (also known as Clan Feuds), adapted from Taiwanese novelist Gu Long's wuxia novel of the same title. It was filmed in 2005, and aired in 2007. In late 2007, Choo was part of the main cast of another Gu Long adaptation, The Legend of Chu Liuxiang.

But it was her leading role as a betrayed wife in revenge melodrama The Temptation to Go Home (also known as Temptation of Going Home or Lure of Homecoming), a 2011 remake of Korea's Temptation of Wife (the original and remake both received high ratings), that catapulted Choo into stardom in Mainland China and made her one of the most sought-after Hallyu stars there. Fluent in Chinese and English, Choo has since relocated to Beijing and concentrated on her acting career in China, with occasional forays in Korean cinema. Her name is rendered in Chinese as Qiu Cixuan.

When Choo appeared in a semi-nude hanbok photo shoot for a Chinese magazine in 2011, she was criticized by Korean netizens for "damaging the national costume's image." Because of the controversy, she closed down her Twitter account and is instead active on the Chinese microblogging platform Weibo. Choo's old nude photos were also leaked to Chinese websites that year; her Chinese agency said the photos had been taken for personal reasons and threatened legal action against those circulating them.

She continued playing lead roles in Chinese television dramas of various genres (epic, fantasy, period drama, contemporary romance), such as Wipe Out the Bandits of Wulong Mountain (2012), Turbulence of the Mu Clan (2012), Hu Xian (2013), Legend of Southwest Dance and Music (2013), Xiu Xiu's Men (2014), and Gorgeous Workers (2014).

== Personal life ==
Choo announced on November 30, 2016 that she would be marrying Chinese actor and singer Yu Xiaoguang in 2017. Her management agency said that the families of the two recently met and discussed how to prepare for the wedding. The actress first revealed their romantic relationship through Chinese social media site Weibo in September 2015. They first met while appearing in a Chinese drama in 2012. They married on January 18, 2017.

On June 1, 2018, Choo gave birth to a boy at a hospital in Seoul, South Korea.

== Filmography ==
=== Film ===
Year	English Title	Original Title	Role	Notes/Ref.
1996	The Adventures of Mrs. Park	박봉곤 가출 사건	Hye-soo	
2005	Short Time	이대로, 죽을 순 없다	Yang Jung-ae	
2005	Travel in Fog	안개 속의 여행		
2006	Bloody Tie	사생결단	Ji-young	
2008	Portrait of a Beauty	미인도	Seol-hwa	
2009	Missing	실종	Hyun-jung	
2010	Le Grand Chef 2: Kimchi Battle	식객:김치전쟁	Seong-chan's mother (cameo)	
2010	Loveholic	참을 수 없는	Ji-heun	
2011	Short! Short! Short! 2010: Fantastic Theater	환상극장	Lee Seo-yeon	segment: "The Famished" (허기)
2014	The Boundary	全城通缉		
2024	While You Were Sleeping	당신이 잠든 사이	Yoon Deok-hee	

=== Korean television ===
Year	English Title	Korean Title	Role	Notes/Ref.
1996	18, Feeling of Growing Up	성장느낌 18세		
1997	Miss & Mister	미스&미스터		
1998	The Eldest	맏이		
1999	KAIST	카이스트		
1999	The Last War	마지막 전쟁		
2000	Legends of Love	사랑의 전설		
2000	Because of You	당신때문에	Ahn Soo-eun	
2000	Cruise of Love	사랑의 유람선		
2001	Outing	외출	Jung Nan-young	
2002	Successful Story of a Bright Girl	명랑소녀 성공기	Song Bo-bae	
2002	Sunrise House	해뜨는 집	Jung Mi-hee	
2003	Apgujeong House	압구정 종갓집	Eldest daughter	
2003	Sharp 1	반올림1	Lee Ok-rim's narration	
2004	Oh Feel Young	오! 필승 봉순영	Heo Song-ja	
2005	Family Scandal	가족 연애사	Sun-ah	
2010	A Man Called God	신이라 불리운 사나이	Seo Mi-soo / Choi Kang-hee	
2018	Misty	미스티		
2019	Arthdal Chronicles	아스달 연대기	Asa Hon	Season 1
2019	Beautiful World	아름다운 세상	Kang In-ha	
2020	My Unfamiliar Family	(아는 건 별로 없지만) 가족입니다	Kim Eun-joo	
2022	Green Mothers' Club	그린 마더스 클럽	Byeon Chun-hee	
2022	Little Women	작은 아씨들	Jin Hwa-young	
2022	Narco-Saints	수리남	Park Hye-jin	Special appearance
2025	Unmasked	트리거	Cho Hae-Won	
2025	Head over Heels	견우와 선녀	Yeom Hwa	

=== Chinese television ===
Year	English Title	Chinese Title	Role
2003	Scent of Love	恋香	Jeon Ho-yeon/Yin Xiangzhi
2007	The Legend of the Banner Hero	大旗英雄传	Shui Lingguang
2007	The Legend of Chu Liuxiang	楚留香传奇	Shi Guanyin
2007	Let Love Rain Like Pearls	让爱化作珍珠雨	Bei Xinru
2011	The Temptation to Go Home	回家的诱惑	Gao Shanshan/Lin Pinru
2012	Wipe Out the Bandits of Wulong Mountain	新乌龙山剿匪记	Chen Feng Jiao
2012	Turbulence of the Mu Clan	木府风云	A Leqiu
2012		从将军到士兵	Guan Biyun
2013	Hu Xian	狐仙	Nie Xiaoqian
2013	Legend of Southwest Dance and Music	舞乐传奇	Ye Shaluo
2014		长安三怪探	Wei Ruozhao
2014	Xiu Xiu's Men	秀秀的男人	
2014	Gorgeous Workers	华丽上班族	Zhang Wei

== Awards and nominations ==
Year	Award	Category	Nominated work	Result
2004	KBS Drama Awards	Best Supporting Actress	Oh Feel Young	Nominated
2006	7th Busan Film Critics Awards	Best Supporting Actress	Bloody Tie	Won
2006	43rd Grand Bell Awards	Best New Actress	Bloody Tie	Won
2006	27th Blue Dragon Film Awards	Best New Actress	Bloody Tie	Nominated
2006	5th Korean Film Awards	Best Supporting Actress	Bloody Tie	Won
2006	5th Korean Film Awards	Best New Actress	Bloody Tie	Won
2006	9th Director's Cut Awards	Best New Actress	Bloody Tie	Won
2007	43rd Baeksang Arts Awards	Best New Actress	Bloody Tie	Nominated
2009	46th Grand Bell Awards	Best Supporting Actress	Portrait of a Beauty	Nominated
2009	30th Blue Dragon Film Awards	Best Supporting Actress	Portrait of a Beauty	Nominated
2009	17th Korean Culture and Entertainment Awards	Excellence Award, Actress in Film	Portrait of a Beauty	Won
2012	CCTV Chinese TV Star of the Year Awards	International Cooperation Award		Won
2013	2nd APAN Star Awards	Achievement Award	—N/a	Won
2013	8th Seoul International Drama Awards	Best Actress	Turbulence of the Mu Clan	Nominated
2015	10th Seoul International Drama Awards	Mango TV Popularity Award	—N/a	Won
2017	11th SBS Entertainment Awards	Hot Star of the Year	Same Bed, Different Dreams 2: You Are My Destiny	Won
2021	7th APAN Star Awards	Best Supporting Actress	My Unfamiliar Family	Nominated
