= 2017 SBS Entertainment Awards =

11th edition of award ceremony

- Date: December 30, 2017
- Site: SBS Prism Tower, Sangam-dong, Mapo-gu, Seoul
- Hosted by: Main: Jun Hyun-moo; Choo Ja-hyun; Lee Sang-min; Special: Yang Se-hyung; Park Na-rae

Television coverage
- Network: SBS
- Duration: 200 minutes
- Viewership: 13.1% (part 1); 13.8% (part 2)

The 2017 SBS Entertainment Awards presented by Seoul Broadcasting System (SBS), took place on December 30, 2017 at SBS Prism Tower in Sangam-dong, Mapo-gu, Seoul. It was hosted by Jun Hyun-moo, Choo Ja-hyun and Lee Sang-min. The nominees were chosen from SBS variety, talk and comedy shows that aired from December 2016 to November 2017.

== Nominations and winners ==
(Winners denoted in bold)

Grand Prize (Daesang)
**Lee Sun-mi**, **Ji In-sook**, **Lee Ok-jin**, **Im Yeo-soon** – **My Little Old Boy**
Program of the Year	Hot Star of the Year
**Einstein** (Culture Documentary); **My Little Old Boy** (Entertainment)	**Yu Xiaoguang** and **Choo Ja-hyun** – **Same Bed, Different Dreams 2**
Top Excellence Award in Variety Category	Top Excellence Award in Show/Talk Category
**Ji Suk-jin** – **Running Man**	**Seo Jang-hoon** – **My Little Old Boy**, **Same Bed, Different Dreams 2**
Excellence Award in Variety Category	Excellence Award in Show/Talk Category
**Kang Susie** – **Flaming Youth**; Haha – Running Man; Ji Suk-jin – Running Man; Kim Kwang-kyu – Flaming Youth	**Tony An** – **My Little Old Boy**; **Kim Jun-hyun** – **Fantastic Duo 2**; Kim Sook – Same Bed, Different Dreams 2; Seo Jang-hoon – My Little Old Boy
Rookie Award in Variety Category	Rookie Award in Show/Talk Category
**Jeon So-min** – **Running Man**; **Kang Daniel** – **Master Key**	**Jung Jae-eun** – **Single Wife**; **Lee Sang-min** – **My Little Old Boy**
PD's Award	Global Star Award
**Kim Byung-man** – **Law of the Jungle**	**Running Man team**
Achievement Award	Best MC Award
**Baek Jong-won** – **Baek Jong-won's Food Truck**	**Kim Suk-hoon** – **Curious Stories Y** (Culture Documentary); **Jun Hyun-moo** – **K-pop Star 6**, **Fantastic Duo 2**, **Master Key** (Entertainment)
Entertainment Scene Stealer Award	Best Entertainer Award
**Park Myeong-su** – **Single Wife**; **Yoon Jung-soo** – **My Little Old Boy**; Don Spike – My Little Old Boy; Kim Jong-min & Bbaek Ga – My Little Old Boy; Lee Kyung-kyu – Law of the Jungle; Shiho Yano – Choovely Family Outing	**Kim Kwang-kyu** – **Flaming Youth**; **Lee Yoo-ri** – **Single Wife**
Best Challenge Award	Best Teamwork Award
**Jo Bo-ah** – **Law of the Jungle**; **Kim Se-jeong** – **Law of the Jungle**; **Narsha** – **Jagiya**	**Flaming Youth team**
Best Couple Award	Scriptwriter of the Year
**Lee Kwang-soo** and **Jeon So-min** – **Running Man**; Choi Sung-kook and Lee Yeon-soo – Flaming Youth; Gim Gu-ra and Seo Jang-hoon – Same Bed, Different Dreams 2; Park Soo-hong and Yoon Jung-soo – My Little Old Boy	**Jang Yoon-jeong** – **Dad's War**; **Jeon Jin-sil** – **Boom Boom Power**; **Noh Yoon** – **Same Bed, Different Dreams 2**
Mobile Icon Award	Radio DJ Award
**Kim Ki-soo** – **Kim Ki-soo's "Do You Want to Be Pretty? Can You Just Take It?"**; **Park Na-rae** – **"Copy and Paste" Show**	**Kim Sook** and **Song Eun-i** – **Song Eun-i, Kim Sook's Sisters Radio**; **Kim Young-chul** – **Kim Young-chul's Power FM**

== Presenters ==
Order	Presenter	Award	Ref.
1	Yoo Jae-suk, Park Na-rae	Rookie Award	
2	Ong Seong-woo, Park So-hyun	Radio DJ Award	
3	Yang Se-hyung, Yang Se-chan	Mobile Icon Award	
4	Park Myeong-su, Cao Lu	Best Couple Award	
5	Seo Jang-hoon, Tony An	Best Teamwork Award	
6	Kim Saeng-min, Kim Sook	Best Challenge Award	
7	Kim Hwan, Irene	Best Entertainer Award	
8	Lee Kwang-soo, Jo Bo-ah	Entertainment Scene Stealer Award	
9	Kim Jong-kook, Haha	Best MC Award	
10	Ji Suk-jin, Irene	Program of the Year	
11	Kang Daniel, Song Ji-hyo	Hot Star of the Year	
12	Kim Suk-hoon, Jeon So-min	Achievement Award	
13	Kim Jun-hyun, Shiho Yano	Global Star Award	
14	Jong Tae-se, Jang Shin-young	Excellence Award	
15	Nam Seung-yong, Lee Yoo-ri	PD's Award	
16	Gim Gu-ra, Dasom	Top Excellence Award	
17	Park Jeong-hoon, Lee Seung-gi	Grand Prize (Daesang)	

== Special performances ==
Order	Artist	Song/Spectacle	Ref.
1	Fantastic Duo 2 team (Jun Hyun-moo, Kim Jun-hyun, DinDin, Kim Se-jeong)	Amor Fati (아모르 파티) (Original: Kim Yeon-ja)	
2	Kim Wan-sun, Narsha, Sunmi	Gashina (가시나)	
3	Flaming Youth team (Kim Kwang-kyu, Choi Sung-gook, Kim Joon-seon, Lee Yeon-soo)	Parkingman of Love (사랑의 파킹맨)	
4	Wanna One	It's Me (Pick Me) (나야 나)	
