= Master Key (TV program) =

South Korean variety show

- Hangul: 마스터 키
- RR: Maseuteo ki
- MR: Masŭt'ŏ k'i
- Genre: Game show; Variety show
- Directed by: Im Hyung-taek
- Starring: Lee Soo-geun; Jun Hyun-moo
- Country of origin: South Korea
- Original language: Korean
- No. of seasons: 1
- No. of episodes: 13 (list of episodes)

Production
- Producer: Im Hyung-taek
- Production location: South Korea
- Camera setup: Multi-camera setup
- Running time: 100 mins
- Production company: SBS Arts Center

Original release
- Network: SBS, SBS Plus, SBS funE
- Release: October 14, 2017 – January 6, 2018

Master Key (Korean: 마스터 키) is a South Korean variety show that aired on SBS every Saturday at 18:10 (KST) from October 14, 2017 to January 6, 2018.

== Format ==
=== Episodes 1–3 ===
The game starts with 12 players trying to find 12 keys scattered around Master Village, one for each player, before proceeding to the Room of Fate and check if their respective key is one of the two Master Keys or not. Players will then be divided into two teams of six and compete in various Investigation Mission games in order to obtain clues about the Master Key owners. The audience also acts as Watchers and can vote for one of the players before each episode to allow the player to win a special benefit of obtaining additional clues about the Master Key owners. At the end of the episode, the players each have to vote for two players that they believe are the Master Key owners. Those who correctly vote for both Master Key owners will win the prize of 12 gold keys. The two Master Key owners will have to avoid getting voted the most and must find each other in order to win the top prize. If neither criterion occurs, no winners are declared.

=== Episodes 4–9 ===
The players proceed directly to the Room of Fate, where each of them picks one among the 12 keys placed inside the room. Among the keys, one of them is the Angel Master Key and another one is the Devil Master Key, the rest being the regular keys. The players will then be divided into two teams of six and compete in various Investigation Mission games in order to obtain clues about the Master Key owners, while each trying to individually win the votes from other players by claiming himself/herself as the Angel Master Key owner. The audience also acts as Watchers and can vote for one of the players before each episode to allow the player to win a special benefit of being able to cast two votes instead of only one vote for the final voting. At the end of the episode, the players must vote for one player that they believe is the Angel Master Key owner. The prize is distributed according to one of the three possible results below:

- If the Angel Master Key owner is the most voted player, the prize is won by the owner of the Angel Master Key and all players who voted for him/her. The amount of gold keys won by each of them is the base prize number of gold keys multiplied by the number of votes received by the Angel Master Key, then are equally distributed among all winners.
- If the Devil Master Key owner is the most voted player, the prize is won by the owner of the Devil Master Key. The amount of the gold keys won is the base prize number of gold keys multiplied by the number of votes received by him/her.
- If one of the regular key owner is the most voted player, the prize is won by him/herself. The amount of the gold keys won is the base prize number of gold keys added by the number of votes received by him/her.

The format is slightly changed on episode 8. Out of the 12 players, two will be randomly assigned with the ability to cast extra votes at the final voting, one being able to cast two votes and another being able to cast three votes. The Devil Master Key owner will also gain an additional vote each time his/her team win an Investigation Mission game. The benefit for the Watchers' voting winner has also changed to a phone call with the Key Man, where the benefit winner can ask two questions and the Key Man will only answer yes or no.

A further change is implemented on episode 9, in which the number of Devil Master Key owners is increased to two and there is only a player randomly assigned with the ability to cast 3 votes. The benefit for the Watchers' voting winner changes to selecting a player and confirm whether that player is a Master Key owner or not, and is only known to the voting winner. At the end of the final voting, if one of the two Devil Master Key owners is the most voted player, the prize will be won by both Devil Master Key owners. The amount of the gold keys won is the base prize number of gold keys multiplied by the number of votes received by him/her, then is divided equally among both Devil Master Key owners.

=== Episode 10 ===
The format underwent a major change. There are only 7 players and one Master Key. In the beginning, the players have to work together as a team to find Master Cars. Each Master Car has one mission and if the contestants manage to complete it, they'll get a key and check whether it can open the box or not. If they find both keys to open the box, they get 6 keys and only one of them is the Master Key and one player doesn't get a key. The players have to find boxes and try to open them with their own key and if they can open 2 or more boxes, then their key is the Master Key and they can open the Master Box which has one golden key as a prize. The winner can be the owner of the Master Key or another player who steals the key.

=== Episode 11 ===
At the beginning of the episode and after one mission, the 7 players have to choose one of the two choices, which are different. If they win the mission they get either one or two keys. If every player has one key, everyone has to open a box and choose between the two choices individually. If all members choose '7' everyone gets a golden key but if they choose '1' only one of them can win and the Master Key belongs to the players that chose '7'.

=== Episode 12 ===
Lee Soo-geun served as the host, while others formed three teams: Jun Hyun-moo and Mingyu were part of the white team, Kim Dong-jun and Ko Sung-hee of the yellow team, and Kim Jong-min and Jeong Se-woon of the green team. They played Olympic games and the team with the most points won.

=== Episode 13 ===
The players have to escape by completing the missions and gaining the keys to open the box with the tickets for the bus to Seoul and they only have limited time. On the way to Seoul, they have to complete missions at rest stations to get hints about the location of the Master Box.

== Cast ==
The original fixed members of the show are Lee Soo-geun and Jun Hyun-moo. Kang Daniel and Ong Seong-wu were initially guests for episode 1, but later officially joined the program from episode 4 to 10.

== List of Episodes ==
Ep.	Air date	Teams		Master Key Owners		Results	Watchers' Voting Winner (Note: Prior to each episode, viewers, as Watchers, can access to the official homepage of SBS Master Key to see the star players and choose their own player. The player with the highest number of votes will be given a benefit before the games.)
1	October 14	Red Team: Lee Soo-geun, Park Sung-kwang, Jinyoung (B1A4), Baekhyun (EXO), Kang Daniel (Wanna One), Jo Bo-ah	Black Team: Jun Hyun-moo, Kim Jong-min, Henry, Ong Seong-wu (Wanna One), Cha Eun-woo (Astro), Kang Han-na	Henry, Cha Eun-woo		Lee Soo-geun, Park Sung-kwang, Jinyoung, Baekhyun, Kang Daniel, Jo Bo-ah win	Baekhyun
2	October 21	Grey Team: Lee Soo-geun, Kim Jong-min, Chansung (2PM), Lee Hong-gi (F.T. Island), Bobby (iKON), Chaeyeon (DIA)	Blue Team: Jun Hyun-moo, Eunhyuk (Super Junior), Henry, Shownu (Monsta X), Sungjong (INFINITE), Sejeong (Gugudan)	Eunhyuk, Chansung		Bobby, Chaeyeon win	Eunhyuk
3	October 28	Orange Team: Lee Soo-geun, Kim Jong-min, Chansung (2PM), Lee Hong-gi (F.T. Island), P.O (Block B), Lee Elijah	White Team: Jun Hyun-moo, Eunhyuk (Super Junior), Henry, CNU (B1A4), Mingyu (Seventeen), Hani (EXID)	Jun Hyun-moo, Eunhyuk		No winners	Mingyu
Ep.	Air date	Teams		Master Key Owners		Results	Watchers' Voting Winner
Ep.	Air date	Teams		Angel	Devil	Results	Watchers' Voting Winner
4	November 4	Black Team: Lee Soo-geun, Kang Daniel (Wanna One), Key (SHINee), Mino (WINNER), JR (NU'EST), Sana (Twice)	White Team: Jun Hyun-moo, Ong Seong-wu (Wanna One), Henry, Chanyeol (EXO), Jinyoung (GOT7), Lee Sun-bin	Lee Soo-geun	Song Mino	Chanyeol wins	Chanyeol
5	November 11	Blue Team: Lee Soo-geun, Kang Daniel (Wanna One), Key (SHINee), Song Mino (Winner), Jeong Se-woon, Yerin (GFRIEND)	Grey Team: Jun Hyun-moo, Ong Seong-wu (Wanna One), Henry, Eunkwang (BTOB), Hongbin (VIXX), Wendy (Red Velvet)	Kang Daniel	Key	Lee Soo-geun, Jun Hyun-moo, Henry, Ong Seong-wu, Kang Daniel, Jeong Se-woon win	Kang Daniel
6	November 18	Blue Team: Kang Daniel (Wanna One), Seo Jang-hoon, Kim Hee-chul (Super Junior), Jinyoung (GOT7), JR (NU'EST), Jimin (AOA)	White Team: Jun Hyun-moo, Ong Seong-wu (Wanna One), Lee Sang-min, Eunhyuk (Super Junior), Jackson (GOT7), Ko Won-hee	Lee Sang-min	Ong Seong-woo	Ong Seong-wu wins	Kang Daniel
7	November 25	Black Team: Kang Daniel (Wanna One), Lee Sang-min, Eunkwang (BTOB), Taemin (SHINee), Chorong (Apink), SinB (GFRIEND)	White Team: Ong Seong-wu (Wanna One), Seo Jang-hoon, Yoon Ji-sung (Wanna One), Key (SHINee), Sojin (Girl's Day), Nayoung (Pristin)	Sojin	Seo Jang-hoon	Lee Sang-min, Eunkwang, Yoon Ji-sung, Ong Seong-wu, Kang Daniel, Sojin, Chorong, SinB win	Kang Daniel
8	December 2	Blue Team: Lee Soo-geun, Kang Daniel (Wanna One), Key (SHINee), JR (NU'EST), Mingyu (Seventeen), Hyojung (Oh My Girl)	White Team: Jun Hyun-moo, Ong Seong-wu (Wanna One), Kim Jong-min, Minho (SHINee), Ha Sung-woon (Wanna One), Minah (Girl's Day)	Jun Hyun-moo	JR	Jun Hyun-moo, Kim Jong-min, Key, Minho, Ha Sung-woon, Ong Seong-wu, Minah win	Kang Daniel
9	December 9	Blue Team: Lee Soo-geun, Kang Daniel (Wanna One), Eric Nam, Key (SHINee), Seungkwan (Seventeen), Kim Chung-ha	White Team: Jun Hyun-moo, Ong Seong-wu (Wanna One), Kim Jong-min, Yoon Ji-sung (Wanna One), Minho (SHINee), Solbin (Laboum)	Kim Jong-min	Lee Soo-geun, Kang Daniel	Jun Hyun-moo, Kim Jong-min, Eric Nam, Yoon Ji-sung, Key, Minho, Ong Seong-wu, Seungkwan, Kim Chung-ha, Solbin win	Kang Daniel (Note: Kang Daniel chose to give away the benefit to the player who is 8th in the episode's Watchers' voting, Lee Soo-geun.)
Ep.	Air date	Players		Master Key Owner		Master Box Holder	Results
10	December 16	Lee Soo-geun, Jun Hyun-moo, Ong Seong-wu (Wanna One), Kang Daniel (Wanna One), Park Sung-kwang, Key (SHINee), Gong Seung-yeon		Gong Seung-yeon		Lee Soo-geun	Lee Soo-geun wins
Ep.	Air date	Players		Master Key Owner		Results	
11	December 23	Lee Soo-geun, Jun Hyun-moo, Kim Jong-min, Eunkwang (BTOB), Key (SHINee), JR (NU'EST), Yoon So-hee		JR		Lee Soo-geun wins	
Ep.	Air date	Players		Results			
12	December 30, 2017	Lee Soo-geun, Jun Hyun-moo, Kim Jong-min, Kim Dong-jun (ZE:A), Mingyu (Seventeen), Jeong Se-woon, Ko Sung-hee		Jun Hyun-moo, Mingyu win			
13	January 6, 2018	Lee Soo-geun, Jun Hyun-moo, Kim Dong-jun (ZE:A), JR (NU'EST), Ren (NU'EST), Mingyu (Seventeen), Ko Sung-hee		Everyone wins			

== List of Recurring cast ==
The following is a compilation of Recurring cast and the number of times they have appeared on Master Key.

Recurring cast	Episode(s)	No. of appearances
Kang Daniel (Wanna One)	1, 4, 5, 6, 7, 8, 9, 10	8
Ong Seong-wu (Wanna One)	1, 4, 5, 6, 7, 8, 9, 10	8
Key (SHINee)	4, 5, 7, 8, 9, 10, 11	7
Kim Jong-min	1, 2, 3, 8, 9, 11, 12	7
Henry	1, 2, 3, 4, 5	5
JR (NU'EST)	4, 6, 8, 11, 13	5
Mingyu (SEVENTEEN)	3, 8, 12, 13	4
Eunhyuk (Super Junior)	2, 3, 6	3
Eunkwang (BTOB)	5, 7, 11	3
Park Sung-kwang	1, 10	2
Lee Hong-gi (F.T. Island)	2, 3	2
Chansung (2PM)	2, 3	2
Mino (Winner)	4, 5	2
Jinyoung (GOT7)	4, 6	2
Jeong Se-woon	5, 12	2
Lee Sang-min	6, 7	2
Seo Jang-hoon	6, 7	2
Yoon Ji-sung (Wanna One)	7, 9	2
Minho (SHINee)	8, 9	2
Ko Sung-hee	12, 13	2
Kim Dong-jun (ZE:A)	12, 13	2
Jinyoung (B1A4)	1	1
Baekhyun (EXO)	1	1
Jo Bo-ah	1	1
Kang Han-na	1	1
Cha Eun-woo (ASTRO)	1	1
Bobby (iKON)	2	1
Chaeyeon (DIA)	2	1
Sungjong (INFINITE)	2	1
Shownu (Monsta X)	2	1
Sejeong (Gugudan)	2	1
P.O (Block B)	3	1
Lee Elijah	3	1
CNU (B1A4)	3	1
Hani (EXID)	3	1
Chanyeol (EXO)	4	1
Lee Sun-bin	4	1
Sana (Twice)	4	1
Hongbin (VIXX)	5	1
Wendy (Red Velvet)	5	1
Yerin (GFriend)	5	1
Heechul (Super Junior)	6	1
Jimin (AOA)	6	1
Jackson (GOT7)	6	1
Ko Won-hee	6	1
Taemin (SHINee)	7	1
Chorong (Apink)	7	1
SinB (GFriend)	7	1
Sojin (Girl's Day)	7	1
Nayoung (Pristin)	7	1
Minah (Girl's Day)	8	1
Hyojung (Oh My Girl)	8	1
Ha Sung-woon (Wanna One)	8	1
Eric Nam	9	1
Seungkwan (SEVENTEEN)	9	1
Kim Chung-ha	9	1
Solbin (Laboum)	9	1
Gong Seung-yeon	10	1
Yoon So-hee	11	1
Ren (NU'EST)	13	1

== Ratings ==
- In the ratings below, the highest rating for the show will be in red, and the lowest rating for the show will be in blue each year.

Ep.	Broadcast Date	TNmS Ratings		AGB Ratings	
Ep.	Broadcast Date	Part 1	Part 2	Part 1	Part 2
1	October 14, 2017	4.9%	5.7%	4.8%	5.7%
2	October 21, 2017	3.8%	4.6%	3.7%	4.5%
3	October 28, 2017	3.0%	4.3%	3.3%	3.7%
4	November 4, 2017	3.4%	4.0%	3.8%	4.8%
5	November 11, 2017	3.5%	3.2%	3.2%	4.0%
6	November 18, 2017	3.4%	3.7%	3.1%	3.3%
7	November 25, 2017	3.1%	3.0%	2.7%	2.8%
8	December 2, 2017	3.1%	2.6%	3.1%	2.6%
9	December 9, 2017	1.6%	2.2%	2.1%	2.4%
10	December 16, 2017	3.0%	3.0%	3.0%	3.1%
11	December 23, 2017	2.8%	2.8%	2.9%	2.8%
12	December 30, 2017	3.2%	3.2%	3.0%	2.6%
13	January 6, 2018	2.9%	2.9%	3.0%	3.2%

== Awards and nominations ==
Year	Award	Category	Recipient	Result	Ref.
2017	SBS Entertainment Awards	Best MC Award	Jun Hyun-moo	Won	
2017	SBS Entertainment Awards	Rookie Award – Variety	Kang Daniel	Won	
