= Wu Yunduo =

Chinese engineer

- 吴运铎
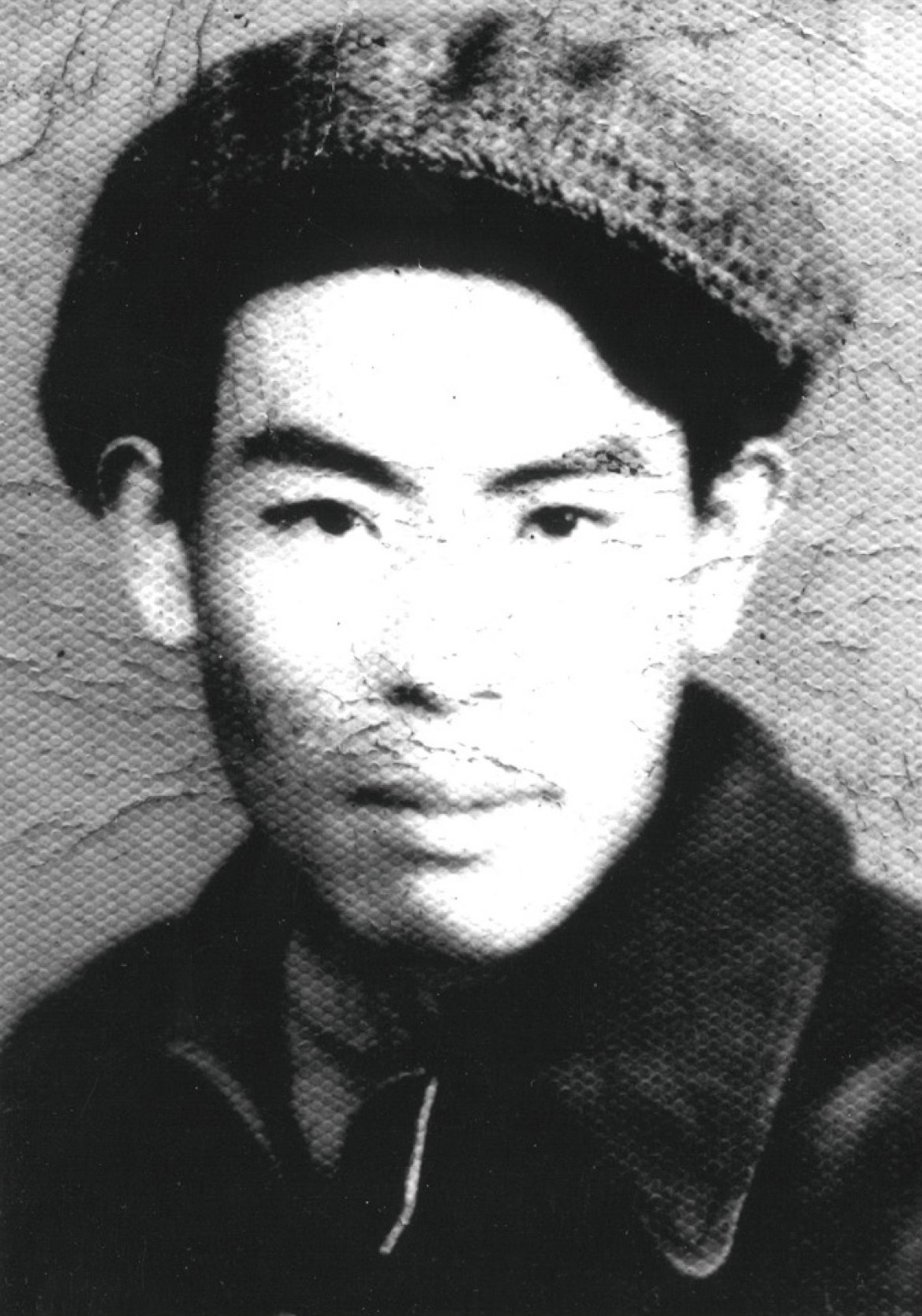
- Wu Yunduo in 1940s
- Born: 17 January 1917
- Died: 2 May 1991 (aged 74)
- Occupations: Engineer, writer

Chinese name
- Traditional Chinese: 吳運鐸
- Simplified Chinese: 吴运铎
Transcriptions
Standard Mandarin
- Hanyu Pinyin: wú yùn duó
- Wade–Giles: wu yün to

Wu Yunduo (simplified Chinese: 吴运铎; traditional Chinese: 吳運鐸, 17 January 1917 – 2 May 1991) was a Chinese revolutionary, mechanical engineer and writer. He oversaw the development of arms industry for the New Fourth Army during the Second Sino-Japanese War. He was also among the first worker-writers in the People's Republic of China, and was known as "China's Pavel Korchagin".

== Early life ==
On 17 January 1917, Wu was born in Pingxiang, Jiangxi Province. His father, Wu Shutang, was a worker at the Anyuan Coal Mine (Chinese: 安源煤矿). At the age of seven, he enrolled at a primary school run by a local coal miners union. Following the 1927 Shanghai massacre, production at the Anyuan Coal Mine fell as the Nationalist government began arresting and executing suspected communists in Pingxiang. In the ensuing financial hardship, Wu left school after completing the fourth grade, and took up manual labor to help support his family.

When the Anyuan Coal Mine closed down in 1930 due to poor operation, Wu and his family moved to their ancestral home in Caidian, Hubei Province. In the following year, they moved to Huangshi, where Wu became an apprentice in the mechanical workshop of the Fuyuan Coal Mine (Chinese: 富源煤矿).

== New Fourth Army ==
In September 1938, Wu, along with three fellow workers from Anyuan, traveled to Yunling Town in southern Anhui to join the communist-led New Fourth Army. He was tasked with managing the construction and operation of the first weapons repair workshop. In 1939, he formally joined the Chinese Communist Party, and became the leader of the repair team at the New Fourth Army Headquarter Repair Shop.

During a repair operation in 1940, a crank handle from an engine fell off and injured Wu's left foot. The injury caused infection in his left foot, and in the ensuing surgery a portion of his left ankle was removed. Following the Wannan incident in 1941, he relocated with the New Fourth Army to Huainan, where he became the director of the Third Arsenal Factory.

During a repair operation in 1941, a detonator exploded on Wu's left hand, resulting in the loss of four fingers, serious injuries on his left knee and left eye, and a coma which lasted for 15 days. After recovery, he resumed his work in arms production, and served as the deputy director of the Military Industry Department for the Second Division of the New Fourth Army. In 1944, his department manufactured a total of 36 infantry support guns for the war effort.

== Later career ==
In 1947, Wu went to Dalian to serve as the director of an artillery fuze factory. In September, while he was inspecting a dud shell in a shell explosion experiment, the dud shell exploded, causing severe injuries on his left wrist, right leg and right eye.

In December 1949, Wu traveled to Soviet Union for treatment, where the fragments from the previous accident were successfully removed from his eye. In the following year, he attended the 1950 International Workers' Day ceremony in Red Square, as well as visited the Nikolai Ostrovsky Museum. In May, he returned to China and became the director of Zhuzhou Arsenal.

In October 1951, Wu was awarded the title of National Model worker by the All-China Federation of Trade Unions. In 1953, he published his autobiography, Ba Yiqie Xian Gei Dang (Chinese: 《把一切献给党》; lit. 'Give all to the party'). In the autumn of 1955, he led a group of 108 technicians to study the manufacture of anti-aircraft guns in the Soviet Union. Upon his return to China in 1957, he became the director of the First Research Institute of the Second Ministry of Machine Building.

During the Cultural Revolution, Wu was dismissed of his duties and accused of being a "reactionary authority". The charges against him and his family were acquitted in 1978.

On 2 May 1991, Wu died of illness in Beijing.
