= Touchin' =

2019 single by Kang Daniel

Single by Kang Daniel

from the album Cyan
- B-side: "Adulthood"
- Released: November 25, 2019
- Recorded: 2019
- Genre: K-pop
- Label: Konnect; Sony Music
- Composers: Laurent Wilthien; Jean-Noel Wilthien; Matthieu Tosi; Nick McKerl; Logan Lee Turner; Ryan S. Jhun; Noday
- Lyricists: JQ; Shin Sae-rom; Kang Eun-yoo
- Producers: Royale Avenue; Ryan S. Jhun

Kang Daniel singles chronology
"What Are You Up To" (2019)	"Touchin'" (2019)	"2U" (2020)

Music video
- "Touchin'" on YouTube "Adulthood" on YouTube

"Touchin'" (stylized "TOUCHIN'") is a song by South Korean singer Kang Daniel. It was released digitally by Konnect Entertainment on November 25, 2019 and was later included in his second EP Cyan on March 24, 2020. The digital single included a second track "Adulthood" with lyrics co-written by Kang.

== Background ==
On November 13, 2019, Kang Daniel posted a surprise teaser image on social media and announced news of a digital single release on the 25th at 6pm KST, marking his first comeback after releasing Color on Me four months prior. The single is said to be his first step towards a broad musical spectrum. An image of entwined hands, which would serve as the single's cover picture, was posted on the 18th and also revealed the title track name. The first set of black-and-white noir-themed concept photos was posted on the 20th, and a second set of photos featuring Kang in a suit was uploaded on the 21st.

== Composition ==
"Touchin'" is described as having an '80s to '90s pop sound that combines characteristics of various genres, including EDM, rock, and dance, highlighting a strong bass in the chorus. The song's motif interprets the first encounter between a film's main characters.

The second track "Adulthood" expresses thoughts about becoming an adult but not wanting to grow up yet. Lyrically, there is push and pull between the ideal free-spirited adult self and the tired and lonely adult self in real life. The song has a lively melody and features a soft synthesizer.

== Music video ==
The "Touchin'" music video teaser was revealed on November 22, 2019, and the full music video produced by FantazyLab was released on November 25, 2019. The video features Kang in a casual setting approaching an old CRT television and selecting a VHS tape labeled "Touchin'" to watch. A black-and-white film runs, and one of the characters is portrayed by Kang himself.

== Promotion ==
Kang debuted "Touchin'" at his Color on Seoul fan meeting held at KINTEX on November 23–24, 2019 prior to the official music site release. He then performed "Touchin'" at awards shows Asia Artist Awards on November 26 and the 2019 Melon Music Awards. He also made radio and variety appearances, guesting on Cultwo Show and becoming a special MC for KBS2 shows Happy Together and Fun-Staurant, where he performed the choreography. He was able to promote on music shows KBS2's Music Bank, SBS's Inkigayo, and SBS MTV's The Show. His return to music shows occurred nearly a year after his last music show performance in December 2018, and he received an award in person on The Show. After Kang promoted for a week, Konnect announced he would be taking a break due to health issues, and his scheduled activities were canceled.

== Track listing ==
Digital download
No.	Title	Lyrics	Music	Arrangement	Length
1.	"Touchin'"	JQ; Shin Sae-rom; Kang Eun-yoo	Laurent Wilthien; Jean-Noel Wilthien; Matthieu Tosi; Nick McKerl; Logan Lee Turner; Ryan S. Jhun; Noday	Royale Avenue; Ryan S. Jhun	3:05
2.	"Adulthood"	Dvwn; Noday; Versachoi; Kang Daniel	Noday; Dvwn; Versachoi	Versachoi; Noday	3:05
Total length:					6:10

== Charts ==
Chart (2019)	Peak position
South Korea (Gaon)	71

== Accolades ==
Year	Award	Category	Result	Ref.
2020	29th Seoul Music Awards	Dance Performance Award	Nominated	

=== Music program awards ===
Program	Date	Ref.
The Show (SBS MTV)	December 3, 2019	

== Release history ==
Region	Date	Format	Label
Various	November 25, 2019	Digital download; streaming	Konnect Entertainment; Sony Music
