= List of Universal Music Group artists =

This is a list of Universal Music Group musical artists. Bands are listed by the first letter in their name (not including the words "a", "an", or "the"), and individuals are listed by last name.

== 0–9 ==
- 10cc
- 10 Years
- 2 Chainz
- 3 Doors Down
- 4minute (South Korea)
- 4 Strings
- 5 Seconds of Summer (Australia)
- The 1975

== A–B ==
- Anitta
- Anyma (Interscope)
- A-Mei Chang (Taiwan)
- Aaliyah
- Abandon All Ships
- AC/DC
- Gracie Abrams (Interscope)
- Ace of Base
- Bryan Adams
- Adéla (Capitol)
- Ado
- Aespa (SM/Capitol (US Only), South Korea)
- AFI
- A1J (Vietnam only)
- Afrojack
- After Midnight Project
- AGA (Hong Kong)
- Agoney
- Airbourne
- The Airborne Toxic Event
- Aitana
- AKB48 (Japan)
- Akon
- Yemi Alade
- Alesso
- Alexandros (Japan)
- All About Eve
- The All-American Rejects
- All That Remains
- All Time Low
- Gary Allan
- Alphabeat
- Alphaville
- Alpha Drive One (WakeOne/Republic (US Only), South Korea)
- Alsou
- Alter Bridge
- Amaranthe
- Amr Diab (Egypt)
- Namie Amuro
- Anastacia
- Anberlin
- Angels & Airwaves
- Anggun
- Paul Anka
- Anthrax
- Steve Aoki
- Apink (South Korea)
- Apocalyptica
- The Aquabats
- Guilherme Arantes
- Beni Arashiro
- Arcade Fire
- Jann Arden
- India Arie
- Army of Lovers (Sweden)
- Ashanti
- Ashes Divide
- Asia
- Putthipong Assaratanakul (Thailand)
- Rick Astley
- Astrid S
- Atreyu
- Ateez (KQ, South Korea)
- Audioslave
- Ariel Nan
- August Burns Red
- Johnta Austin
- Jin Au-Yeung
- Avenged Sevenfold
- Iggy Azalea
- Charles Aznavour
- BG
- Lil Baby (Capitol/Quality Control/Motown)
- Babyface
- Baby Lasagna
- Bad Meets Evil
- Erykah Badu
- Backstreet Boys
- David Banner
- David Glen Eisley
- Barenaked Ladies (Walt Disney Records)
- Base Ball Bear
- Bastille
- BamBam
- Franco Battiato
- Beast (South Korea)
- Beastie Boys
- The Beatles
- Bee Gees
- Cruz Beckham (Republic)
- Kristen Bell (Walt Disney Records)
- Pat Benatar
- Benny Benassi
- Edoardo Bennato
- Eugenio Bennato
- Dierks Bentley
- Ben Utomo (Def Jam Southeast Asia)
- Berlin
- Gael García Bernal (Walt Disney Records)
- Tiago Bettencourt (Portugal)
- Beyoncé (Walt Disney Records)
- Justin Bieber
- BamBam
- BigBang (YG, South Korea)
- Big Sean
- Jane Birkin
- David Bisbal
- Aloe Blacc
- Dan Black
- The Black Eyed Peas
- Blackpink (YG, South Korea) (2018-2023)
- Black Tide
- Black Veil Brides
- Blink-182
- Blood Raw
- Bloodhound Gang
- Bloom 06
- The Notorious B.I.G.
- Billy Blue
- Blue
- Blue October
- Jonas Blue
- Emily Blunt (Walt Disney Records)
- James Blunt
- Andrea Bocelli
- Bombay Rockers
- Bow Wow (Young Money/Cash Money/Billionaires Records)
- Black Sabbath
- Badshah (rapper)
- Bon Jovi
- Bond
- Bowkylion (Thailand)
- Bone Thugs-n-Harmony
- Boston
- Boys Republic (South Korea)
- Bow Wow
- Brand New
- Brandy
- The Bravery
- TJ Davis (Walt Disney Records)
- Tamar Braxton
- Toni Braxton
- Breaking Benjamin
- Alicia Bridges
- Carlinhos Brown
- Divine Brown
- James Brown
- Bruno & Marrone (since 2017)
- Luke Bryan
- BtoB (South Korea)
- BTS (Hybe – Big Hit/Geffen/Interscope, South Korea)
- Buckcherry
- Bullet for My Valentine
- Bun B
- BUS (Thailand)
- Emma Bunton
- Buraka Som Sistema
- David Bustamante
- Butthole Surfers

== C–D ==
- Camila Cabello (Geffen/Interscope) (Since 2022)
- Colbie Caillat
- Cortis (Hybe – Big Hit/Republic, South Korea)
- Camille
- Bruno Campos (Walt Disney Records)
- Caparezza
- Capital Cities
- Chi Xê (Vietnam)
- Lewis Capaldi
- Alessia Cara
- Irene Cara
- Mariah Carey
- Belinda Carlisle (US and Canada only)
- Kim Carnes
- Sabrina Carpenter (Island)
- The Carpenters
- Vikki Carr
- Brynn Cartelli
- Cascada
- Jace Chan (2019–2023)
- Johnny Cash
- Cash Cash
- Cassie
- Biquini Cavadão
- Nick Cave
- Cazuza
- Cepeda (singer)
- Chamillionaire
- Eason Chan
- Jordan Chan
- Greyson Chance
- Keshia Chanté
- Charlee
- Charlene
- Ray Charles
- Charles and Eddie
- Justin Chart
- Sunidhi Chauhan (India)
- The Cheetah Girls (Hollywood Records/Walt Disney Records)
- The Chemical Brothers
- Kelly Chen (Hong Kong)
- Chenoa
- Cher
- Cherish (Since 2006)
- Cheryl (United Kingdom)
- Jacky Cheung
- Tessanne Chin
- Children Collide
- Phil Collins (Virgin UK; Walt Disney Records)
- Chicane
- Children of Bodom
- China Crisis
- Chitãozinho & Xororó
- Jay Chou (Taiwan)
- Chumbawamba
- Chvrches (UK only)
- Tami Chynn
- Cimorelli
- Cinema Bizarre (band)
- City Boy
- Petula Clark
- Robert Clary
- Classics IV
- Cledus Maggard & the Citizen's Band
- Jemaine Clement (Walt Disney Records)
- Clementino (since 2013)
- Patsy Cline
- George Clinton
- Green Day
- Clouds
- Momoiro Clover
- Coal Chamber
- Joe Cocker
- Coldplay (former)
- Keyshia Cole
- Jacob Collier
- Common
- Jennifer Connelly (Eastworld)
- Bradley Cooper
- Easton Corbin
- Chris Cornell
- Corson
- Counting Crows
- Clique Girlz
- Cannibal Corpse
- Crashdïet
- Ciara
- CPM 22
- The Cranberries
- Auliʻi Cravalho (Walt Disney Records)
- Crawlers (band)
- Crazy Frog
- Crazy Town
- Creamy
- The Cross
- Taio Cruz
- Crystal Castles
- The Crystal Method
- Culture Club
- The Cure
- Curren$y
- Cut Copy
- Miley Cyrus
- D12
- DaBaby
- Da Mouth
- Daddy Yankee
- Dancemania
- Elhaida Dani
- Danzig
- Dark Tranquility
- Tiffany Darwish
- Chris Daughtry
- Craig David
- Keith David (Walt Disney Records)
- Darude
- Days Difference
- Dead by April
- Dave Matthews Band
- Deadmau5
- Death (Canada)
- Dean (South Korea)
- Olivia Dean (United Kingdom)
- Deep Purple
- December 10 (Syco/EMI/Republic (US Only), United Kingdom)
- Def Leppard
- Emmelie de Forest
- Lana Del Rey
- LUSS (XOXO Entertainment, Thailand)
- LE7EL (LIT Entertainment, Thailand)
- DeLon
- Kat DeLuna
- Mao Denda
- Depeche Mode
- Desiigner
- Device
- Diamond Platnumz
- Dido
- Die Antwoord
- Celine Dion (Walt Disney Records)
- Dire Straits
- Dirty Vegas
- Aura Dione
- Divine
- Carlos do Carmo
- DJ Snake
- DMX
- DEXX (Thailand)
- DNCE
- Doda
- Doro
- Double You
- Dolla (Malaysia)
- The-Dream
- Dreams Come True (Since 1997)
- DragonForce (Finland)
- Dragonette
- Drake (OVO/Republic, Canada)
- Dr. Dre
- The Drums
- Duck Sauce
- Duffy
- Dulce Maria
- Duke Dumont
- Josh Dun
- Zélia Duncan (1998–2012)
- Duran Duran (North America)
- Jason Dy (Philippines)
- Dzeko
- Destroy Lonely (Opium)

== E–F ==
- Frxddy young
- Kate Earl
- Sheena Easton
- Eazy-E
- Eels
- Taron Egerton
- Eiffel 65
- Billie Eilish
- Chiwetel Ejiofor (Walt Disney Records)
- Mikky Ekko
- Cássia Eller
- Yvonne Elliman
- Eloy
- Eminem
- Enhypen (Hybe – Belift Lab/Geffen, South Korea)
- Paul Engemann
- Enigma
- Enca
- Enya (Geffen)
- Emma's Imagination
- Empire of the Sun
- Enter Shikari
- Equinox (Bulgaria)
- Sully Erna
- Electric Banana Band
- Escape the Fate
- Darren Espanto (Philippines)
- Estelle
- Melissa Etheridge
- Evanescence
- Everglow
- Mark Oliver Everett
- Exodus
- Fabolous
- Faithless
- Fall Out Boy
- FanFan
- Far East Movement
- Mylène Farmer (for releases until 1997)
- Fazura (Malaysia)
- Felli Fel
- Fei Yu-ching
- Fergie
- Paula Fernandes
- Tiziano Ferro (Italy)
- Fever Ray
- Fung Ho Lam
- Fujii Kaze (Japan)
- The Fevers
- Fabri Fibra
- Shane Filan
- Finger Eleven
- Melanie Fiona
- Helene Fischer (Germany)
- Fisherman's Friends
- Five for Fighting (Walt Disney Records)
- Flaw
- The Fleetwoods
- Flipsyde
- FLO (United Kingdom)
- Florence and the Machine
- David Fonseca
- Forever the Sickest Kids
- Lita Ford
- Frankie Goes to Hollywood
- Chester French
- Fresno (2008–2010)
- Mel Fronckowiak
- Masaharu Fukuyama
- Nelly Furtado

== G–H ==
- Josh Gad (Walt Disney Records)
- Gal Gadot (Walt Disney Records)
- Lady Gaga (Streamline/Interscope)
- Serge Gainsbourg
- Green Day
- Lyca Gairanod (Philippines)
- Sakura Gakuin
- The Game
- Melody Gardot
- Gaston Bros
- Green Day
- Art Garfunkel
- Martin Garrix
- Manu Gavassi
- Crystal Gayle (United Artists/Capitol/Liberty)
- Cedric Gervais
- Ghostface Killah
- Vince Gill
- Girlicious
- Girls Aloud (United Kingdom)
- Girlset (JYP/Republic)
- Girls' Generation (SM, South Korea)
- Glass Animals
- Donald Glover (Walt Disney Records)
- Go Back to the Zoo ( Netherlands)
- Go_A (Ukrainian band)
- Sergio Godinho (Portugal)
- Godsmack
- The Go-Go's
- Golden Earring (Netherlands)
- Selena Gomez
- Anthony Gonzales (Walt Disney Records)
- Lesley Gore
- Gorillaz
- Gotye
- Ellie Goulding
- The Graces
- Josh Gracin
- Ariana Grande (Republic/Babydoll Music)
- Amy Grant
- Gravitonas (Sweden)
- Conan Gray (Republic)
- David Gray
- Loren Gray
- Great White
- Skylar Grey (since 2004)
- Christina Grimmie
- Jonathan Groff (Walt Disney Records)
- Bai Guang
- Ana Guerra (Spain)
- Juan Luis Guerra
- David Guetta (former)
- Guns N' Roses
- Cory Gunz
- GZA
- Haddaway
- Han Sara
- Halsey
- Charles Hamilton
- Jan Hammer
- Jay Hardway
- George Harrison
- Debbie Harry
- Yū Hayami
- Asuca Hayashi
- Megumi Hayashibara
- Isaac Hayes
- Joe Hisaishi
- Heart
- Hedley
- Hololive Production
- Hellogoodbye
- Heyoon Jeong (South Korea)
- Hide
- Keri Hilson
- HIM
- Hinder
- Aya Hirano
- Amy Holland
- Eddie Holland
- Buddy Holly
- Hollywood Monsters (Canada)
- Hollywood Undead
- Rupert Holmes
- Minako Honda
- Bai Hong
- Hoobastank
- Ace Hood
- Mallary Hope
- Hot Rod
- Andy Hui (Hong Kong)
- Hot Chelle Rae
- Tomoyasu Hotei
- Hozier
- Mr Hudson
- The Human League
- Hyper Crush
- Homixide Gang (Opium)

== I–J ==
- I Blame Coco
- I Mother Earth
- I Prevail
- Il Volo
- Ice Nine Kills
- Icehouse
- Ida Maria
- Idntt (Modhaus, South Korea)
- Ikke Nurjanah (Indonesia)
- Enrique Iglesias
- Ilegales
- Illit (Hybe – Belift Lab/Geffen, South Korea)
- Ilya
- Imagine Dragons
- Miki Imai
- IMx
- In Dread Response
- Inna
- Incubus
- Infected Mushroom
- Inner Circle
- Infinite (South Korea)
- Institute
- Iron Maiden
- IRONBOY (Thailand)
- Ironik
- Tajja Isen
- Itzy (JYP/Republic (US Only), South Korea)
- Iz*One (Off The Record, Swing, South Korea)
- Izna (WakeOne/Republic (US Only), South Korea)
- Iza (Walt Disney Records)
- Jackie Jackson (1968–1976)
- Jermaine Jackson (1968–1983)
- Michael Jackson (1968–1976)
- The Jackson 5 (1968–1976)
- Jacquees
- Jacky Cheung
- Jada
- Jadakiss
- Jadyn Maria
- Jay-Z
- Ja Rule
- Jean-Michel Jarre
- Wyclef Jean
- Jedward
- Jeezy
- Jelena Karleuša
- Carly Rae Jepsen
- Jeremih
- Jack Jersey
- Gloria Jessica (Indonesia)
- Jessie J
- Jessie James
- Elton John
- Dwayne Johnson (Walt Disney Records)
- Jack Johnson
- Marv Johnson
- Michael Johnson
- Jonas Brothers
- Joe Jonas
- Jovanotti
- Juanes
- Juice WRLD
- JT (Quality Control/Motown)

== K–L ==
- Kadim Al Sahir (Iraq and Morocco)
- Kuana Torres Kahele
- Israel Kamakawiwoʻole
- Karkadan
- Katrina and the Waves
- Katseye (Hybe UMG/Geffen)
- Crystal Kay
- Kelis
- Keshi (Island)
- Claude Kelly
- Tori Kelly
- DJ Khaled
- Wiz Khalifa (Rostrum Records)
- KickFlip (JYP/Republic (US Only), South Korea)
- Kid Abelha (Since 2000)
- Kid Cudi
- Kidz Bop Kids
- The Killers
- Natalia Kills
- Lil' Kim
- Kiss
- Kings of Leon
- K.I.Z
- The Knife
- Kristian Kostov
- Kaori Kozai
- KR$NA (India)
- Kodak Black
- Alison Krauss
- Eric Kwok (Hong Kong)
- George Lam (Hong Kong)
- Gin Lee (Hong Kong)
- La Roux
- Juan Karlos Labajo (Philippines)
- Lady A
- Ladyhawke
- Natalia Lafourcade (Walt Disney Records)
- Laleh
- Sandy Lam
- Kendrick Lamar
- Ken Carson (Opium (record label))
- Kensington (band) (the Netherlands)
- Kobo Kanaeru (Hololive Indonesia)
- La Materialista
- Elettra Lamborghini
- Bishop Lamont
- Yves Larock
- Latifa (Tunisia)
- Latino
- Lawson
- LUSS (XOXO Entertainment, Thailand)
- Lebo M (Walt Disney Records)
- LE7EL (LIT Entertainment, Thailand)
- Swae Lee
- Suger 'N Spice (LIT Entertainment, Thailand)
- John Lennon
- Fish Leong
- Nolwenn Leroy (France)
- Donna Lewis
- Prudence Liew
- Lifer
- Lights
- Lil Ru
- Lim Hyung Joo
- Lim Young-woong
- Limp Bizkit
- Little River Band
- Liu Huan (China)
- Cher Lloyd
- LMFAO
- Justin Lo (Hong Kong)
- Lowell Lo (Hong Kong)
- Tove Lo
- Lobão
- Lobo
- Logic
- The Lonely Island
- Jennifer Lopez
- Pablo Lopez
- T Lopez
- Lorde
- Loona (Japan)
- Pixie Lott
- Demi Lovato
- Lucenzo
- Ludo
- Ludacris
- The Lumineers
- Luna Sea
- Ross Lynch
- Lyodra Ginting (Indonesia)
- LYKN (Japan only)
- The Last Dinner Party

== M–N ==
- Mabel
- Seth MacFarlane
- Mary MacGregor
- Mack 10
- Madonna (Since 2010)
- Kaitlyn Maher
- Mahmood (singer)
- Mack Maine
- Ziva Magnolya (Indonesia)
- The Maine
- Majid Al Mohandis (Rotana Records)
- Yngwie Malmsteen
- Glasses Malone
- Post Malone
- Marilyn Manson
- Mamonas Assassinas
- Mandisa
- Mannie Fresh
- Marcelo D2
- Marcus & Martinus
- Marky
- Maria Isabel
- Bob Marley
- Maroon 5 (Interscope)
- Marracash
- Marshmello
- Jessica Mauboy
- Dean Martin
- The Marvelettes
- Richard Marx
- Massacration
- Masta Killa
- Takako Matsu
- Seiko Matsuda
- Yumi Matsutoya
- Yasuko Matsuyuki
- John Mayer
- Paul McCartney
- JD McCrary
- Reba McEntire
- Bobby McFerrin
- Maureen McGovern
- Tim McGraw
- Kevin McHale
- Don McLean
- Katharine McPhee
- Meat Loaf
- Megadeth
- John Mellencamp
- Shawn Mendes
- Roi Méndez
- Bridgit Mendler
- Idina Menzel (Walt Disney Records)
- Meovv (The Black Label/Capitol)
- Daniel Merriweather
- Metallica
- Metal Church
- Method Man
- Lena Meyer-Landrut
- MIA
- Michael Learns to Rock (Virgin Records)
- Julia Michaels (Republic)
- Chrisette Michelle
- Migos
- Miguel (Geffen Records/Walt Disney Records)
- Mihimaru GT
- Mika
- Christina Milian
- Jae Millz
- Nicki Minaj
- Lin-Manuel Miranda (Walt Disney Records)
- Miyavi
- Mishlawi (Germany)
- Miss A (JYP, Since 2012, South Korea)
- Mohamed Hamaki (Egypt)
- Karen Mok (Hong Kong)
- Zascha Moktan
- Moneybagg Yo
- Monsta X (Starship, South Korea)
- Monster Magnet
- French Montana
- Mori Calliope
- Ryoko Moriyama
- Giorgio Moroder
- James Morrison
- Lil Mosey
- Motörhead
- Mohamed Mounir
- Ana Moura (Portugal)
- George Michael
- Nana Mouskouri
- Mumford & Sons
- Anne Murray
- Muse
- Kacey Musgraves
- Mushroomhead
- Mýa
- Billie Myers
- David Nail
- Nadia Nakai (South Africa)
- Najwa Karam (Lebanon)
- The Naked and Famous
- Naked Eyes (US and Canada only)
- Ariel Nan
- Nancy Ajram (Lebanon)
- Gianna Nannini
- Nas
- Milton Nascimento
- Nasty C (South Africa)
- Nate Dogg
- Nav
- Nawal El Zoghbi (Rotana Records)
- NCT 127 (SM, South Korea)
- N-Dubz (United Kingdom)
- Ne-Yo
- Nelly
- Jesy Nelson (United Kingdom)
- N.E.R.D
- Nexz (JYP/Republic (US Only), Japan/South Korea)
- Nmixx (JYP/Republic (US Only), Japan/South Korea)
- Randy Newman
- Olivia Newton-John (US and Canada)
- Kary Ng (Hong Kong)
- Nickelback (Canada)
- Night Ranger
- Nightwish
- Nimo (Germany)
- Alice Nine
- Nine Inch Nails
- Nirvana (Geffen)
- NOFX
- Noize MC (2006–2008)
- Noizy (Albania)
- Willy Northpole
- Novelbright (Japan)
- Terri Nunn
- N.W.A.
- NX Zero (2006–2012)
- Cassper Nyovest

== O–P ==
- Colby O'Donis
- Dolores O'Riordan
- Octpath (Japan)
- Kardinal Offishall
- Ol' Dirty Bastard
- Don Omar
- Of Monsters and Men
- Oh Wonder
- Oingo Boingo
- Chiyo Okumura
- OneRepublic
- Yoko Ono
- Pantera
- Oomph!
- Orianthi
- Johnny Orlando
- Emily Osment
- The Offspring (Reissue)
- The Outfield (1990–1992)
- Outrage
- O-Town (A&M Records, Japan/Germany/France)
- Electric Banana Band
- Kenji Ozawa
- P.O.D.
- Packky Sakonnaree (Thailand)
- Will Pan (Taiwan)
- Papa Roach
- PiaLinh (Vietnam)
- Elena Paparizou (Greece)
- Eric Papilaya (Austria)
- The Parlotones
- Tina Parol (Walt Disney Records)
- Dolly Parton
- Morteza Pashaei
- Sean Paul
- Rob Paulsen (Walt Disney Records)
- Belinda Peregrín
- Katy Perry (Capitol)
- P1X3L (HK) (2021–)
- P1Harmony (FNC, South Korea)
- Pet Shop Boys (US and Canada)
- Peter Bjorn and John
- Pierce the Veil
- Perfume
- Phantogram
- Phantom Blue
- Pink Floyd
- Pixxie (LIT Entertainment, Thailand)
- The Platters
- Play
- Playaz Circle
- Poeta Callejero
- Pongsri Woranuch (Thailand)
- The Police (US only)
- Cassadee Pope
- Mike Posner
- Denez Prigent
- The Pussycat Dolls
- Push Baby
- Parachute
- The Presets
- Barbara Pravi
- Prima J
- Jamie Principle
- The Pursuit of Happiness (Canada)
- PSY (since 2012, South Korea)
- Playboi Carti (Opium (record label))

== Q–T ==
- Gong Qiuxia
- Wanting Qu
- Queen (since 2011)
- Queens of the Stone Age
- Queensrÿche
- R5
- Ra
- A. R. Rahman
- Rainbow (South Korea)
- Rainer + Grimm
- RachYO (Thailand)
- Eros Ramazzotti
- Dizzee Rascal
- Testament
- Ramones (Chrysalis Records)
- Razorlight
- Rebeldes (EMI Music Brazil/Record Entertenimento)
- Redman
- Red Hot Chili Peppers (1983–1990)
- Trippie Redd
- Troye Sivan (Australia)
- Tobii (Def Jam Thailand)
- Helen Reddy
- Rev Theory
- Lana Del Rey
- Dan Reynolds
- Busta Rhymes
- Rich Boy
- Lionel Richie
- Flo Rida
- Rihanna
- Rise Against
- Tyson Ritter
- Johnny Rivers
- Nicola Roberts
- Rocko
- Olivia Rodrigo (Geffen/Interscope)
- Kenny Rogers
- The Rolling Stones
- Amaia Romero
- Rooney
- Tono Rosario
- Diana Ross
- Rick Ross
- Asher Roth
- Royce da 5'9"
- Sakis Rouvas (Greece)
- RPM
- Rubber Soul
- Paulina Rubio (2000–2020)
- Kevin Rudolf
- The Runaways
- Brenda Russell
- Renato Russo
- Alexander Rybak
- Serena Ryder
- Baba Saad
- Sagarika
- Saber Rebai (Rotana Records)
- Kyu Sakamoto
- Mark Salling
- Sam Smith (Capitol)
- Samved (India)
- Marta Sánchez
- Jessica Sanchez
- Sandy
- Sandy & Júnior
- Ivete Sangalo
- Juelz Santana
- Lulu Santos
- Nico Santos
- Santos Bravos (Hybe Latin America/Republic (US Only), South America)
- Michael Sarver
- Joe Satriani
- Satyricon
- Tiwa Savage (Nigeria)
- Saving Grace
- Nicole Scherzinger
- Scooter
- Scorpions
- Lil Scrappy
- Jay Sean
- Seeb
- Seether
- Raul Seixas
- Serebro (Worldwide/Japan)
- Sienna Spiro (Capitol)
- Seventeen (Hybe – Pledis/Geffen, South Korea)
- Karol Sevilla (Walt Disney Records)
- Shaan
- Shaggy
- Tupac Shakur
- Shareefa
- Shatha Hassoun (Morocco and Iraq)
- Ringo Sheena
- Ashton Shepherd
- Rabbi Shergill
- Sherine (Rotana Records)
- SHINee (SM, South Korea)
- Shontelle
- Show-Ya (Eastworld, Japan)
- Sia
- Sigma
- Krista Siegfrids (Finland)
- Sigrid
- Silentó
- Sarah Silverman (Walt Disney Records)
- Ashlee Simpson
- Jessica Simpson
- Frank Sinatra
- Bob Sinclar
- Sister Soleil
- Simone & Simaria (Since 2015)
- Simple Minds
- Simple Plan (Lava Records)
- Siti Nurhaliza (Malaysia)
- Troye Sivan
- Smile.dk
- Slash
- Slayer
- Slick Rick
- Smash Mouth
- Dan Smith
- Sam Smith
- Patty Smyth
- Snoop Dogg
- Snow Patrol
- Sodagreen (Taiwan)
- Sauti Sol (Kenya)
- Stella Soleil
- Dtidrik Solli-Tangenh
- Martin Solveig
- Jeon So-mi (South Korea)
- Sonata Arctica
- Luísa Sonza (Walt Disney Records)
- Soraya
- Sornphet Sornsuphan (Thailand)
- Takashi Sorimachi
- Soulja Boy
- Spandau Ballet
- Dusty Springfield
- Sugarland
- Space Cowboy
- Spice Girls
- Spose
- Rae Sremmurd
- Vince Staples
- Chris Stapleton
- Ringo Starr
- STAYC (High Up, South Korea)
- Sting
- Stray Kids (JYP/Republic (US Only), South Korea)
- Street Drum Corps
- Steel Panther
- Gwen Stefani
- Hailee Steinfeld
- Rod Stewart
- George Strait
- Stromae
- Tinchy Stryder
- Stryper
- The Stunners
- Sum 41
- Stefanie Sun
- Chay Suede
- Donna Summer
- Super Junior (SM, South Korea)
- Super Monkey's
- Supertramp
- Surfaces
- Svoy
- Taylor Swift
- t.A.T.u.
- T-ara (South Korea)
- Junnosuke Taguchi
- Yukihiro Takahashi
- Take That
- Alan Tam
- Nami Tamaki
- Tamta (Greece)
- Eriko Tamura
- Tarja
- Tataloo
- Amir Tataloo
- Teyana Taylor
- Tears for Fears
- Ryan Tedder
- Teresa Teng (Japan only)
- Thirty Seconds to Mars
- Tiara Andini (Indonesia)
- Salma Salsabil (Indonesia)
- Tiësto
- Tihuana
- TM88
- Tokio Hotel
- Tom Tom Club
- Rie Tomosaka
- Toquinho
- T'Pau
- The Tragically Hip
- The Neighbourhood
- The Rose (South Korea)
- Malu Trevejo
- Treat
- Neon Trees
- Gloria Trevi
- TripleS (Modhaus, South Korea)
- Tri.be (South Korea)
- Ms. Triniti
- Mike Tsang (Hong Kong)
- Josh Turner
- TV on the Radio
- Shania Twain
- Twelve Girls Band
- Twice (JYP/Republic (US Only), South Korea)
- Lil Twist
- Conway Twitty
- Tuide (Hybe – ABD/Geffen, South Korea)
- Tomorrow X Together (Hybe – Big Hit/Republic, South Korea)
- TWS (Hybe – Pledis/Geffen, South Korea)
- Tyga
- TYP

== U–V ==
- Ultrabeat
- Carrie Underwood
- Unladylike
- Keith Urban
- U-God
- Vacca
- The Vamps
- Armin van Buuren
- Sepultura
- Vangelis
- Van Halen
- Violette Wautier (Thailand)
- Virginia to Vegas
- The Veer Union
- Venom
- Vitamin Z
- Vixen
- Volbeat

== W–X ==
- Wale
- Sebastian Walldén
- Joe Walsh
- Cyndi Wang
- Wang Chung
- The Wanted
- WaT
- The Weeknd (XO/Republic, Canada)
- Weezer
- Jannine Weigel (Thailand)
- Florence Welch
- Weiland
- Westlife (Ireland)
- Eric Whitacre
- Barry White
- Whitesnake (US and Canada, 1984-1989 catalog until 2017, rights returned in 2026)
- The Who
- The Wiggles (Australia)
- Wisin & Yandel
- Wolfmother
- Lee Ann Womack
- Stevie Wonder
- Holly Williams
- Robbie Williams
- Vanessa Williams
- will.i.am
- Wilson Phillips
- Amy Winehouse
- Steve Winwood
- Within Temptation
- Wonder Girls (South Korea)
- Joe Wong
- Evan Rachel Wood (Walt Disney Records)
- Wu Bai
- Fang Wu
- Vanilla Ice
- Vanness Wu
- Wu Yingyin
- Xamuel (Brazil)
- Babi Xavier
- Wilmer X
- Xikers (KQ, South Korea)
- Xonia
- U2 (Ireland)
- Motörhead

== Y–Z ==
- Yao Lee
- Lil Yachty
- Yoshiko Yamaguchi
- Yazz
- Yeah Yeah Yeahs
- Years & Years
- Yelle
- Yellow Magic Orchestra
- Yohio
- YoungBoy Never Broke Again
- Your Favorite Martian
- Saori Yuki
- Yung L.A.
- Maher Zain (Rotana Records)
- Zhou Xuan
- Zemmoa
- Zendaya
- ZAYN
- Zucchero
- Joana Zimmer
- ZZ Top
- Rob Zombie
- Zubeen Garg
- Yeat

== List of artists on UMLE ==
This is a list of artist currently signed to Universal Music Latin Entertainment.

- 3Ball MTY
- Julión Álvarez
- Anahí
- J Balvin (Universal Latin/Interscope)
- Banda Carnaval
- Banda El Recodo
- Banda Los Recoditos
- Belanova
- Tan Biónica
- David Bisbal
- Charly Black
- Buraka Som Sistema
- David Bustamante
- Café Tacuba
- Cali & El Dandee
- Jencarlos Canela
- Paty Cantú
- Manuel Carrasco
- Chino & Nacho
- Coti
- Elvis Crespo
- Daddy Yankee
- Dulce María
- El Dasa
- Emmanuel
- Alejandro Fernández
- Paula Fernandes
- Pedro Fernández
- Luis Fonsi
- Juan Gabriel
- Juan Luis Guerra
- Grupo Bryndis
- Héctor el Father
- Larry Hernández
- Intocable
- Juanes
- Karol G
- La Arrolladora Banda El Limón
- Mon Laferte
- La Santa Cecilia
- Lasso
- Los Angeles Azules
- Los Horóscopos de Durango
- Los Rakas
- Los Tigres del Norte
- Los Tres
- Lucero
- Juan Magan
- Manny Manuel
- Jesus Mendoza
- Molotov
- Joey Montana
- Don Omar
- Danna Paola
- Ivy Queen
- Eros Ramazzotti
- Jenni Rivera
- Javier Rosas
- Karlos Rosé
- Paulina Rubio
- Ivete Sangalo
- Alejandro Sanz
- Alvaro Soler
- Marco Antonio Solís
- Danay Suarez
- Roberto Tapia
- Malu Trevejo
- Gloria Trevi
- Remmy Valenzuela
- Alx Veliz
- Zoé

== List of former artists on UMLE ==
These are artists who were formerly signed on to either Universal Music Latin Entertainment or Universal Music Latino.

- Babasónicos
- Vikki Carr
- Kevin Ceballo
- Chenoa
- Cristian Castro
- Sergio Dalma
- Franco De Vita
- Oscar D'León
- Cheo Feliciano
- José Feliciano
- Jandy Feliz
- Amaury Gutiérrez
- Myriam Hernández
- Enrique Iglesias
- Il Volo
- Ana Isabelle
- J-King & Maximan
- Alih Jey
- La Factoría
- Grupo Manía
- Makano
- Manny Manuel
- Yolandita Monge
- Domingo Quiñones
- R.K.M. & Ken-Y
- Rosana
- Toño Rosario
- Alessandro Safina
- Sandy & Junior
- Jon Secada
- Selena
- Soraya
- Michael Stuart
- Tamara
- Diego Torres
- Juan Velez
- Wisin & Yandel
- Zucchero
