= Viamópolis =

District in Rio Grande do Sul, Brazil

Coordinates: 30°05.4′S 51°05.14′W

Viamópolis is a Brazilian district within the municipality of Viamão, in Rio Grande do Sul. It belongs to the group of three districts predominantly urban, with Passo do Sabão and Viamão.
