= Cavalhada =

Neighborhood in Porto Alegre, Brazil

Coordinates: 30°06′37″S 51°13′44″W

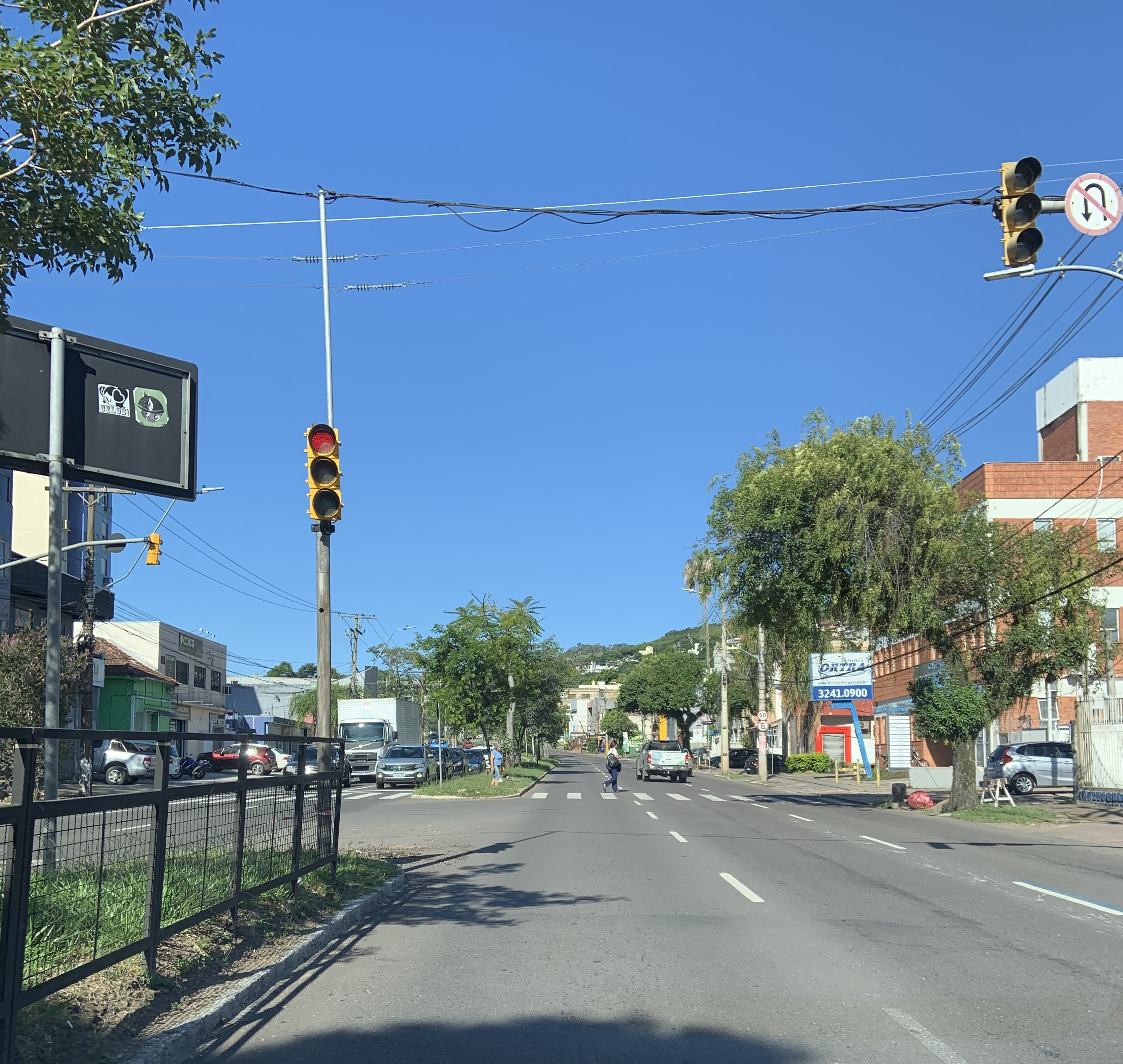
Cavalhada Avenue, Cavalhada, Porto Alegre.

Cavalhada is a neighbourhood (bairro) in the city of Porto Alegre, the state capital of Rio Grande do Sul, in Brazil. It was created by Law 2022 from December 7, 1959.

The neighbourhood name is quite old, dating from the 18th century, when the government expropriated André Bernardes Rangel's properties in order to have a field for the horse herd (cavalhada) belonging to the Royal Treasury. However, it was transferred to Viamão later, and Rangel became the landowner again.

In the 1950s, the Estrada da Cavalhada, nowadays the Carlos Barbosa, Teresópolis, Nonoai e Cavalhada avenues altogether, was finally asphalted.
