= Itapua =

Itapua may refer to several places:

- Itapúa Department, Paraguay
- Itapuã, Salvador, Bahia, Brazil
- Itapuã State Park, Rio Grande do Sul, Brazil
