= Agronomia, Rio Grande do Sul =

Neighbourhood in Porto Alegre, Brazil

Agronomia
- Neighbourhood
- Interactive map of Agronomia
- Coordinates: 30°4′35″S 51°7′51″W
- Country: Brazil
- State: Rio Grande do Sul
- City: Porto Alegre

Area
  - Total: 142.1 km^{2} (54.9 sq mi)

Population
  - Estimate (2000): 10,681

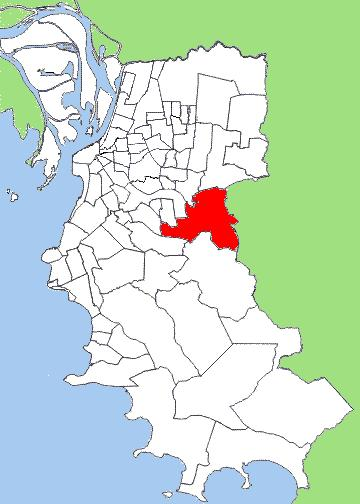
Location of Agronomia

Agronomia (meaning Agronomy in Portuguese) is a neighbourhood (bairro) in the city of Porto Alegre, the state capital of Rio Grande do Sul, Brazil. It was created by Law 4166 from September 21, 1976, but had its limits modified in 1990 and 1997.

The neighborhood borders the municipality of Viamão as well as the Porto Alegre neighborhoods of Partenon and Jardim Carvalho.

== History ==
The neighborhood's origin can be traced back to the 18th century, where there was much traffic through the area on routes that were fundamental for Porto Alegre's growth – the Caminho do Meio (now divided into Avenues Osvaldo Aranha Avenue and Protásio Alves) and the Estrada do Mato Grosso (now Avenue Bento Gonçalves).

Agronomia received this name because of the Faculty of Agronomy of the Federal University of Rio Grande do Sul, founded in 1899. Today it is located inside Campus do Vale of the university, along with other faculties and institutes.

== Present ==
The neighborhood remains sparsely populated, with an economy based in small-scale commerce along the two major routes that define Agronomia's borders. In 2000 there were about 10,681 inhabitants across 142.1 square kilometers.
