= 2023 Copa Truck season =

Truck racing competition

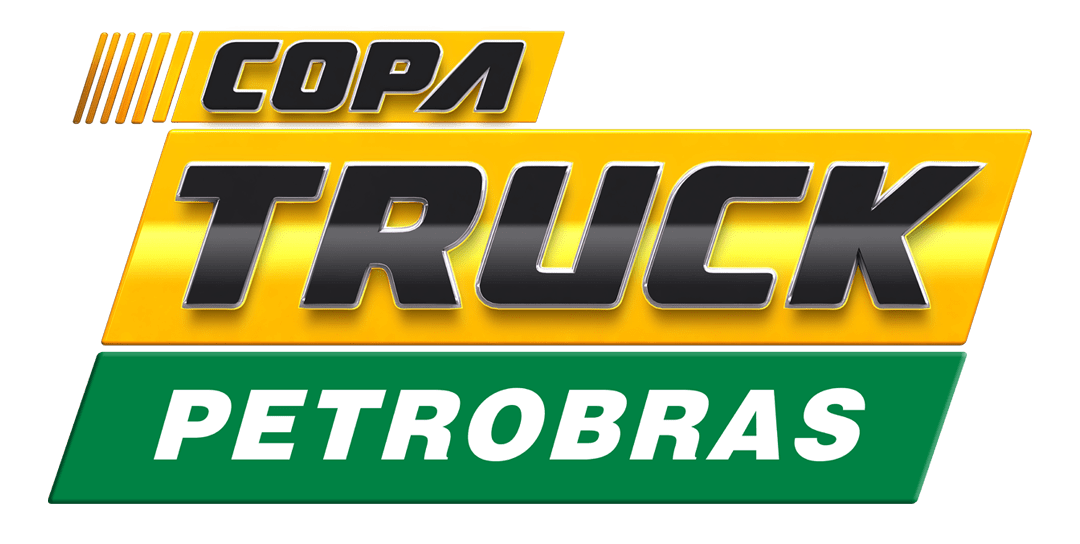
Official Logo

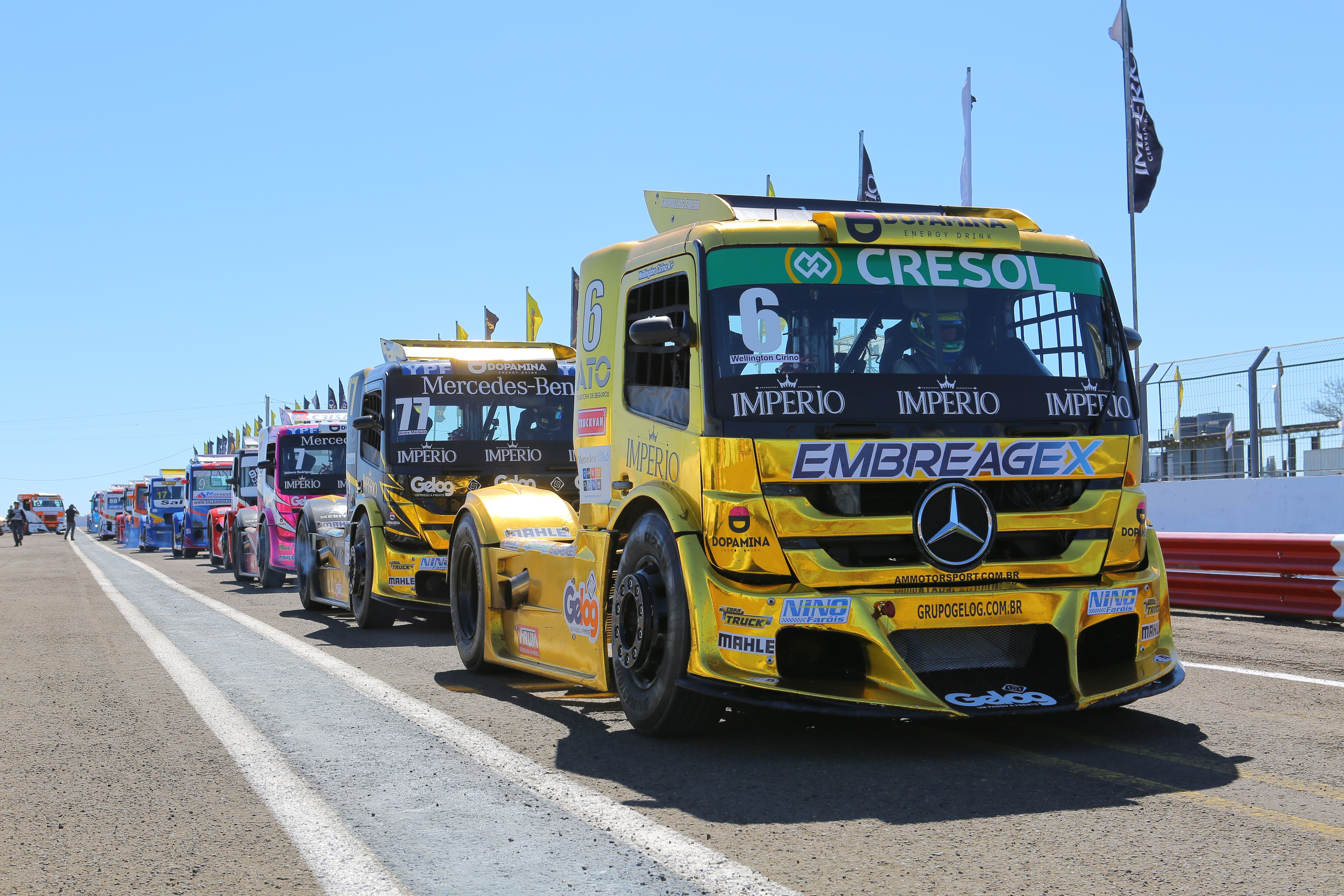
Copa Truck event

The 2023 Copa Truck was the seventh season of the Copa Truck. Felipe Giaffone on board a Volkswagen from R9 Competições became the 2023 Copa Truck Champion, claiming his second series title after 2017. Felipe Tozzo regained his Super Class Title in the Iveco from Dakar Motorsport.

The category's origins came after nine teams left Formula Truck due to disagreements with the problematic management of Neusa Navarro Félix. These teams joined in an association to create the category that replaced Formula Truck. The new category brings together teams and drivers from the old category.

In November 2017, it was approved by the Brazilian Automobile Confederation (CBA) and recognized as an official championship. Carlos Col, former head of the Stock Car Pro Series, is its promoter.

The Truck Cup was officially launched on April 27, 2017, in São Paulo. In the first season, the championship was divided into three regional cups: Midwest, Northeast, and Southeast. The first stage took place on May 28, in Goiânia, with 17 trucks on the grid.

The association is made up of the following teams: RM Competições, AJ5 Sports, DF Motorsport, RVR Motorsports, Dakar Motors, Fábio Fogaça Motorsports, Lucar Motorsports and Clay Truck Racing.

== Teams and drivers ==
Manufacturer	Team	No.	Drivers	Class	Rounds
Volkswagen	(Brazil) R9 Competições	00	(Santa Catarina (state)) Danilo Alamini	P	All
Volkswagen	(Brazil) R9 Competições	4	(São Paulo (state)) Felipe Giaffone	P	All
Volkswagen	(Brazil) R9 Competições	7	(Paraná (state)) Débora Rodrigues	P	All
Volkswagen	(Brazil) R9 Competições	17	(Rio de Janeiro (state)) Thiago Rizzo	S	All
Volkswagen	(Brazil) R9 Competições	77	(São Paulo (state)) André Marques	P	All
Volkswagen	(Brazil) R9 Competições	88	(Pernambuco) Beto Monteiro	P	All
Volkswagen	(Brazil) Odapel Racing/R9	55	(São Paulo (state)) Paulo Salustiano	P	All
Volkswagen	(Brazil) Odapel Racing/R9	81	(São Paulo (state)) José Augusto Dias	S	All
Mercedes-Benz	(Brazil) PP Motorsport	3	(São Paulo (state)) Ricardo Alvarez	S	1–8
Mercedes-Benz	(Brazil) PP Motorsport	12	(Mato Grosso) Juca Bala	S	3–4, 6–9
Mercedes-Benz	(Brazil) PP Motorsport	29	(Mato Grosso) Pedro Paulo Fernandes	S	1–6, 9
Mercedes-Benz	(Brazil) AJ5 ECO Sports	5	(São Paulo (state)) Adalberto Jadim	P	All
Mercedes-Benz	(Brazil) ASG Motorsport	15	(São Paulo (state)) Roberval Andrade	P	All
Mercedes-Benz	(Brazil) ASG Motorsport	22	(São Paulo (state)) Caio Castro	S	All
Mercedes-Benz	(Brazil) ASG Motorsport	25	(Paraná (state)) Jaidson Zini	P	All
Mercedes-Benz	(Brazil) ASG Motorsport	26	(São Paulo (state)) Raphael Abbate	P	All
Mercedes-Benz	(Brazil) ASG Motorsport	45	(São Paulo (state)) Daniel Kelemen	P	All
Mercedes-Benz	(Brazil) ASG Motorsport	99	(São Paulo (state)) Luiz Lopes	P	All
Mercedes-Benz	(Brazil) ASG Motorsport	111	(São Paulo (state)) Bia Figueiredo	S	All
Mercedes-Benz	(Brazil) Tiger Team	10	(São Paulo (state)) Felipe Lapenna	P	1, 5
Mercedes-Benz	(Brazil) Tiger Team	23	(São Paulo (state)) Victor Franzoni	P	1–5, 7–9
Mercedes-Benz	(Brazil) Tiger Team	59	(São Paulo (state)) Evandro Camargo	S	All
Mercedes-Benz	(Brazil) Tiger Team	65	(São Paulo (state)) Felipe Gama	S	2–9
Mercedes-Benz	(Brazil) FF Motorsport	27	(São Paulo (state)) Fábio Fogaça	S	1–5, 7–9
Mercedes-Benz	(Brazil) FF Motorsport	72	(São Paulo (state)) Djalma Fogaça	P	All
Mercedes-Benz	(Brazil) PJ Team	71	(São Paulo (state)) Pê Jota	S	6
Iveco	(Brazil) Usual Racing	6	(Paraná (state)) Wellington Cirino	P	All
Iveco	(Brazil) Usual Racing	21	(São Paulo (state)) Djalma Pivetta	S	All
Iveco	(Brazil) Usual Racing	26	(São Paulo (state)) Danilo Dirani	P	All
Iveco	(Brazil) Dakar Motorsport	57	(Santa Catarina (state)) Felipe Tozzo	S	All
Iveco	(Brazil) Dakar Motorsport	8	(Pernambuco) Sérgio Ramalho	S	6
Volvo	(Brazil) Vannucci Racing	33	(Paraná (state)) Rodrigo Taborda	S	All
Volvo	(Brazil) Vannucci Racing	73	(Paraná (state)) Leandro Totti	P	All
Volvo	(Brazil) Boessio Competições	39	(São Paulo (state)) Hiro Yano	S	2–4
Volvo	(Brazil) Boessio Competições	83	(Rio Grande do Sul) Régis Boessio	P	9
Scania	(Brazil) Electric Truck	2	(Argentina) Gabriel Rodrigo	S	6
Scania	(Brazil) Electric Truck	16	(São Paulo (state)) Guilherme Samaia	S	9
Scania	(Brazil) Electric Truck	70	(São Paulo (state)) Kléber Eletric	S	All

Icon	Class
P	Pro
S	Super

== Schedule ==
Round		Track	Date
1	R1	(Goiás) Autódromo Internacional Ayrton Senna, Goiânia	19 March
1	R2	(Goiás) Autódromo Internacional Ayrton Senna, Goiânia	19 March
2	R3	(São Paulo (state)) Autódromo José Carlos Pace, São Paulo	30 April
2	R4	(São Paulo (state)) Autódromo José Carlos Pace, São Paulo	30 April
3	R5	(Paraná (state)) Autódromo Internacional Ayrton Senna, Londrina	3 June
3	R6	(Paraná (state)) Autódromo Internacional Ayrton Senna, Londrina	3 June
4	R7	(Paraná (state)) Autódromo Internacional Ayrton Senna, Londrina	4 June
4	R8	(Paraná (state)) Autódromo Internacional Ayrton Senna, Londrina	4 June
5	R9	(Paraná (state)) Autódromo Internacional de Cascavel, Cascavel	2 July
5	R10	(Paraná (state)) Autódromo Internacional de Cascavel, Cascavel	2 July
6	R11	(Goiás) Autódromo Internacional Ayrton Senna, Goiânia	29 July
6	R12	(Goiás) Autódromo Internacional Ayrton Senna, Goiânia	29 July
7	R13	(Goiás) Autódromo Internacional Ayrton Senna, Goiânia	30 July
7	R14	(Goiás) Autódromo Internacional Ayrton Senna, Goiânia	30 July
8	R15	(Rio Grande do Sul) Autódromo Internacional de Tarumã, Viamão	15 October
8	R16	(Rio Grande do Sul) Autódromo Internacional de Tarumã, Viamão	15 October
9	R17	(São Paulo (state)) Autódromo José Carlos Pace, São Paulo	10 December
9	R18	(São Paulo (state)) Autódromo José Carlos Pace, São Paulo	10 December

== Championship standings ==
=== Pro Category ===
Pos	Driver	(Goiás) GNA		(São Paulo (state)) SPO		(Paraná (state)) LON		(Paraná (state)) PAR		(Paraná (state)) CAS		(Goiás) GOI		(Rio Grande do Sul) RGS		(Rio Grande do Sul) TAR		(São Paulo (state)) INT		Pts
Pos	Driver	RD1	RD2	RD1	RD2	RD1	RD2	RD1	RD2	RD1	RD2	RD1	RD2	RD1	RD2	RD1	RD2	RD1	RD2	Pts
1	(São Paulo (state)) Felipe Giaffone	1	11	2	8	2	23	3	2	4	13	8	1	1	6	1	2	1	2	263
2	(São Paulo (state)) Roberval Andrade	3	NC	29	3	5	1	4	1	1	1	1	2	4	20	3	1	8	5	256
3	(Pernambuco) Beto Monteiro	4	2	1	7	20	5	1	5	13	5	RET	7	2	4	21	4	3	1	226
4	(São Paulo (state)) Raphael Abbate	9	5	4	5	4	3	9	7	2	4	2	8	8	1	9	8	9	8	211
5	(São Paulo (state)) Paulo Salustiano	6	RET	3	28	21	9	2	6	8	2	5	5	5	3	6	24	2	6	209
6	(Paraná (state)) Jaidson Zini	5	1	6	1	7	2	6	20	5	8	7	3	C	C	C	C	RET	NL	163
7	(Paraná (state)) Wellington Cirino	DSQ	8	11	20	RET	12	13	8	6	18	6	4	6	2	4	11	7	7	157
8	(São Paulo (state)) André Marques	2	9	7	2	1	10	5	3	12	6	RET	NL	3	RET	RET	NL	24	25	156
9	(São Paulo (state)) Victor Franzoni	12	4	10	11	26	8	7	RET	RET	NL			7	5	2	5	5	3	148
10	(São Paulo (state)) Danilo Dirani	RET	NL	12	6	RET	NL	8	4	3	24	3	6	12	7	5	6	6	10	143
11	(São Paulo (state)) Luiz Lopes	10	6	13	18	10	11	NL	NL	7	3	10	10	10	9	8	7	17	16	140
12	(Santa Catarina (state)) Danilo Alamini	13	7	21	9	9	6	10	19	11	7	11	RET	9	8	RET	NC	18	9	128
13	(Paraná (state)) Leandro Totti	11	10	22	RET	3	RET	RET	23	26	11	9	RET	11	16	22	10	4	4	124
14	(Paraná (state)) Débora Rodrigues	8	3	8	4	8	4	22	9	9	9	RET	NL	Wth	Wth	Wth	Wth	10	13	120
15	(São Paulo (state)) Adalberto Jardim	7	DSQ	5	10	28	RET	24	RET	17	22	4	9	RET	21	7	3	RET	11	114
16	(São Paulo (state)) Djalma Fogaça	NC	NL	28	24	6	7	RET	NL	10	25	RET	INF	13	18	RET	9	22	12	77
17	(Santa Catarina (state)) Felipe Tozzo	RET	RET	9	14	11	16	11	12	RET	23	12	16	14	14	13	17	RET	29	71
18	(Rio de Janeiro (state)) Thiago Rizzo	15	RET	15	13	18	15	21	21	24	17	13	RET	19	11	14	13	14	15	50
19	(São Paulo (state)) Evandro Camargo	18	12	18	12	12	17	25	16	RET	NL	23	RET	17	22	12	15	11	14	40
20	(São Paulo (state)) Daniel Keleman	RET	NL	23	16	16	13	RET	NL	14	20	18	12	20	10	15	14	12	24	38
21	(São Paulo (state)) Bia Figueiredo	16	15	RET	17	RET	NL	16	13	19	12	21	14	15	15	11	16	13	20	36
22	(São Paulo (state)) Fábio Fogaça	14	14	30	15	14	19	14	11	21	RET			RET	NL	17	12	NC	INF	31
23	(São Paulo (state)) José Augusto Dias	17	13	14	RET	13	24	17	10	22	15	NC	Wth	23	INF	DSQ	RET	21	28	29
24	(São Paulo (state)) Felipe Gama			20	21	24	18	20	17	20	DSQ	15	11	16	13	10	23	15	26	28
25	(São Paulo (state)) Caio Castro	RET	NL	26	25	25	22	12	24	23	14	RET	NL	18	12	18	18	19	22	14
26	(Paraná (state)) Rodrigo Taborda	NC	17	25	26	22	RET	15	14	25	16	14	18	21	17	19	19	23	23	13
27	(Mato Grosso) Pedro Paulo Fernandes	RET	16	17	29	15	14	27	15	18	NL	17	21					RET	RET	8
28	(São Paulo (state)) Felipe Lapenna	NC	RET							16	10									6
29	(São Paulo (state)) Djalma Pivetta	RET	NL	16	19	17	21	26	RET	15	19	19	17	22	19	16	20	16	21	5
30	(Pernambuco) Sérgio Ramalho											25	13							3
31	(Argentina) Gabriel Rodrigo											16	15							1
32	(São Paulo (state)) Kléber ((not a typo|Eletric}}	20	NC	24	23	23	RET	19	25	RET	21	DNQ	NL	RET	NL	RET	22	RET	17	0
33	(São Paulo (state)) Ricardo Alvarez	19	18	19	22	19	20	18	18	RET	RET	20	NC	NL	NL	NL	NL			0
34	(Mato Grosso) Juca Bala					RET	NL	NL	Wth			24	19	24	RET	20	21	20	27	0
35	(São Paulo (state)) Pê Jota											22	20							0
36	(São Paulo (state)) Hiro Yano			27	27	27	25	23	22											0
37	(São Paulo (state)) Guilherme Samaia																	DNQ	INF	0
38	(Rio Grande do Sul) Régis Boessio																	Wth	Wth	0
Pos	Driver	(Goiás) GNA		(São Paulo (state)) SPO		(Paraná (state)) LON		(Paraná (state)) PAR		(Paraná (state)) CAS		(Goiás) GOI		(Rio Grande do Sul) RGS		(Rio Grande do Sul) TAR		(São Paulo (state)) INT		Pts

Color	Result
Gold	Winner
Silver	2nd-place finish
Bronze	3rd-place finish
Green	Top 5 finish
Light Blue	Top 10 finish
Dark Blue	Other flagged position
Purple	Did not finish
Red	Did not qualify (DNQ)
Brown	Withdrew (Wth)
Black	Disqualified (DSQ)
White	Did Not Start (DNS)
White	Race abandoned (C)
Blank	Did not participate

=== Categoría Super ===
Pos	Driver	(Goiás) GNA		(São Paulo (state)) SPO		(Paraná (state)) LON		(Paraná (state)) PAR		(Paraná (state)) CAS		(Goiás) GOI		(Rio Grande do Sul) RGS		(Rio Grande do Sul) TAR		(São Paulo (state)) INT		Pts
Pos	Driver	RD1	RD2	RD1	RD2	RD1	RD2	RD1	RD2	RD1	RD2	RD1	RD2	RD1	RD2	RD1	RD2	RD1	RD2	Pts
1	(Santa Catarina (state)) Felipe Tozzo	RET	RET	1	3	1	4	1	3	RET	9	1	6	1	5	4	6	RET	12	231
2	(São Paulo (state)) Evandro Camargo	5	1	6	1	2	5	12	7	RET	NL	12	RET	4	9	3	4	1	1	215
3	(São Paulo (state)) Bia Figueiredo	3	4	RET	6	RET	NL	5	4	4	1	10	4	2	6	2	5	3	4	215
4	(Rio de Janeiro (state)) Thiago Rizzo	2	RET	3	2	8	3	10	10	9	5	2	RET	6	2	5	2	4	2	209
5	(São Paulo (state)) Daniel Keleman	RET	NL	9	5	6	1	RET	NL	1	7	7	2	7	1	6	3	2	8	202
6	(São Paulo (state)) Felipe Gama			8	8	12	6	9	8	5	DSQ	4	1	3	4	1	12	5	9	184
7	(Paraná (state)) Rodrigo Taborda	NC	6	11	12	10	RET	4	5	10	4	3	8	8	7	10	8	10	7	179
8	(São Paulo (state)) José Augusto Dias	4	2	2	RET	3	11	6	1	7	3	NC	Wth	10	INF	DSQ	RET	9	11	175
9	(São Paulo (state)) Djalma Pivetta	RET	NL	4	7	7	9	13	RET	2	6	8	7	9	8	7	9	6	5	169
10	(São Paulo (state)) Fábio Fogaça	1	3	14	4	4	7	3	2	6	RET			RET	NL	8	1	NC	INF	157
11	(São Paulo (state)) Caio Castro	RET	NL	12	11	13	10	2	12	8	2	RET	NL	5	3	9	7	7	6	150
12	(Mato Grosso) Pedro Paulo Fernandes	RET	5	5	14	5	2	14	6	3	NL	6	11					RET	RET	114
13	(São Paulo (state)) Ricardo Alvarez	6	7	7	9	9	8	7	9	RET	RET	9	NC	NL	NL	NL	NL			108
14	(São Paulo (state)) Kléber electric	7	NC	10	10	11	RET	8	13	RET	8	DNQ	NL	RET	NL	RET	11	RET	3	88
15	(Mato Grosso) Juca Bala					RET	NL	NL	Wth			13	9	11	RET	11	10	8	10	58
16	(São Paulo (state)) Hiro Yano			13	13	14	12	11	11											34
17	(Argentina) Gabriel Rodrigo											5	5							26
18	(Pernambuco) Sérgio Ramalho											14	3							21
19	(São Paulo (state)) Pê Jota											11	10							17
20	(São Paulo (state)) Guilherme Samaia																	DNQ	INF	0
Pos	Driver	(Goiás) GNA		(São Paulo (state)) SPO		(Paraná (state)) LON		(Paraná (state)) PAR		(Paraná (state)) CAS		(Goiás) GOI		(Rio Grande do Sul) RGS		(Rio Grande do Sul) TAR		(São Paulo (state)) INT		Pts

=== Constructors' Championship standings ===
Pos	Constructor	(Goiás) GNA		(São Paulo (state)) SPO		(Paraná (state)) LON		(Paraná (state)) PAR		(Paraná (state)) CAS		(Goiás) GOI		(Rio Grande do Sul) RGS		(Rio Grande do Sul) TAR		(São Paulo (state)) INT		Pts
Pos	Constructor	RD1	RD2	RD1	RD2	RD1	RD2	RD1	RD2	RD1	RD2	RD1	RD2	RD1	RD2	RD1	RD2	RD1	RD2	Pts
1	(Germany) Volkswagen	1	2	1	2	1	4	1	2	4	2	5	1	1	3	1	2	1	1	596
1	(Germany) Volkswagen	2	3	2	4	2	5	2	3	8	5	8	5	2	4	6	4	2	2	596
2	(Germany) Mercedes-Benz	3	1	4	1	4	1	4	1	1	1	1	2	4	1	2	1	5	3	577
2	(Germany) Mercedes-Benz	5	4	5	3	5	2	6	7	2	3	2	3	7	5	3	3	8	5	577
3	(Italy) Iveco	RET	8	9	6	11	12	8	4	3	18	3	4	6	2	4	6	6	7	306
3	(Italy) Iveco	DSQ	RET	11	14	RET	16	11	8	6	19	6	6	12	7	5	11	7	10	306
4	(Sweden) Volvo	11	10	22	26	3	25	15	14	25	11	9	18	11	16	19	10	4	4	107
4	(Sweden) Volvo	23	18	25	27	22	RET	23	22	26	16	14	RET	21	17	22	19	23	23	107
5	(Sweden) Scania	22	20	24	23	23	RET	19	25	RET	21	16	15	RET	NL	RET	22	RET	17	1
5	(Sweden) Scania	DNP	DNP	DNP	DNP	DNP	DNP	DNP	DNP	DNP	DNP	DNQ	NL	DNP	DNP	DNP	DNP	DNQ	INF	1
Pos	Constructor	(Goiás) GNA		(São Paulo (state)) SPO		(Paraná (state)) LON		(Paraná (state)) PAR		(Paraná (state)) CAS		(Goiás) GOI		(Rio Grande do Sul) RGS		(Rio Grande do Sul) TAR		(São Paulo (state)) INT		Pts

=== Points standings ===
Points	1°	2°	3°	4°	5°	6°	7°	8°	9°	10°	11°	12°	13°	14°	15°
Race 1	22	20	18	16	15	14	13	12	11	10	9	8	7	6	5
Race 2	18	16	14	12	11	10	9	8	7	6	5	4	3	2	1

== See also ==
- 2023 Stock Car Pro Series
- 2023 Stock Series
- Brasileiro de Marcas
- Moto 1000 GP
- SuperBike Brasil
- Fórmula Truck
