= Flip It, Kick It! =

- Digital cover

EP by KickFlip
- Released: January 20, 2025
- Genre: K-pop
- Length: 17:11
- Language: Korean
- Label: JYP

KickFlip chronology
Flip It, Kick It! (2025)	Kick Out, Flip Now! (2025)

Singles from Flip It, Kick It!
- 1. "Umm Great" Released: January 6, 2025; 2. "Mama Said" Released: January 20, 2025

Flip It, Kick It! is the debut extended play by South Korean boy group KickFlip. It was released on January 20, 2025, by JYP Entertainment and comprises six tracks, including the single "Umm Great" and the title track "Mama Said".

== Background ==
Four members of JYP's then-unnamed new boy group—Kyehoon, Amaru, Keiju, and Donghyeon—were selected through the SBS reality competition show Loud (2021). On November 22, 2024, KickFlip was officially announced to debut on January 1, 2025, later postponed to January 6 as a response to the Jeju Air Flight 2216 crash.

On January 5, JYP announced the pre-release single "Umm Great", which will be included in KickFlip's debut EP Flip It, Kick It!, releasing on January 20. "Umm Great" was released a day later. The remaining members of the group were revealed on the same day, alongside the album's promotion schedule. Introductory films for the group and the individual members were released on January 8 and 9, followed by concept photos on January 10, 13 and 14. On January 15, the track listing was released, with "Mama Said" announced as the EP's lead single.

== Composition ==
Flip It, Kick It! contains six tracks. Several members of KickFlip assisted in the writing of the tracks: Amaru for "Mama Said", "Umm Great", along with Donghwa, and "Like a Monster", along with Kyehoon and Minje. During the group's debut showcase, member Donghwa said that they idolize their labelmate and senior group Stray Kids, and were inspired by them to be part of the creative process for their music. The third track, "Warrior", was written by labelmate and Day6 member Young K.

== Promotion ==
To commemorate their debut with the release of Flip It, Kick It!, KickFlip held a pop-up store in JYP Entertainment's office building from January 25 to February 2, which included the sale of merchandise such as tote bags, T-shirts, caps, and posters.

== Commercial performance ==
Flip It, Kick It! surpassed 300,000 copies sold in pre-orders as of January 15. In South Korea, the EP debuted on the top of the Circle Album Chart in the chart issue dating January 19–25, 2025. It also debuted at number 47 on Japan's Oricon Albums Chart in the chart issue dating January 20–26, 2025, with approximately 1,000 copies sold.

== Track listing ==
Flip It, Kick It! track listing
No.	Title	Lyrics	Music	Arrangement	Length
1.	"Mama Said" (뭐가되려고?)	Kevin_D (D_answer); Catcher (153/Joombas); Song Cherry (153/Joombas); Amaru; E.Jean (Artiffect); Four Seasons (153/Joombas); Kass; Mun Yeo-reum (Jamfactory); Kang Se-bi (153/Joombas); Zior Park; Lee Yoon-seol (Jamfactory)	Julia Bognar Finnseter (Blueprint); Henrik Heaven; Kristin Langsrud; Adam Kapit; Tommy Park; Jeremy Tay Jasper	Akap; T. Park	2:56
2.	"Umm Great" (응 그래)	Kass; Amaru; Donghwa	Kass	Kass	2:21
3.	"Warriors"	Young K	Zingo	Zingo	2:58
4.	"Knock Knock"	Jo Yoon-kyung	Kobee (Melange/Inhouse); Holy M (Melange/Inhouse); Ezit (Inhouse)	Kobee; Holy M; Ezit	2:47
5.	"Like a Monster"	Jung Ho-hyun (E.one); Lee Ang-doo (153/Joombas); Kyehoon; Amaru; Minje; Nils Rulewski Stenberg; John Concepcion; Miles Barker	Jung; Stenberg; Concepcion; Barker; Hautboi Rich	Jung	2:48
6.	"See You on Tomorrow" (내일에서 만나)	Danke	Lee Hae-sol; Albin Nordqvist	Lee H.	3:17
Total length:					17:11

== Charts ==
=== Weekly charts ===
Weekly chart performance for Flip It, Kick It!
Chart (2025)	Peak position
Japanese Albums (Oricon)	43
South Korean Albums (Circle)	1

=== Monthly charts ===
Monthly chart performance for Flip It, Kick It!
Chart (2025)	Position
South Korean Albums (Circle)	2

=== Year-end charts ===
Year-end chart performance for Flip It, Kick It!
Chart (2025)	Position
South Korean Albums (Circle)	74

== Release history ==
Release history for Flip It, Kick It!
Region	Date	Format	Label
South Korea	January 20, 2025	CD	JYP
Various	January 20, 2025	Digital download; streaming	JYP
