= My First Kick =

- Digital cover

EP by KickFlip
- Released: April 6, 2026
- Length: 19:35
- Language: Korean; English
- Label: JYP

KickFlip chronology
From KickFlip, To WeFlip (2026)	My First Kick (2026)

Singles from My First Kick
- 1. "Twenty" Released: March 9, 2026; 2. "Eye-Poppin'" Released: April 6, 2026

My First Kick is the fourth extended play (EP) by South Korean boy band KickFlip. The EP was released on April 6, 2026, by JYP Entertainment and comprises seven tracks, including the single "Twenty", and the title track "Eye-Poppin'". Physically, the EP comes in nine versions, including six digipak versions.

== Background ==
KickFlip first revealed they would have a comeback with a pre-release single and a new extended play at their fan concert '2026 KickFlip Fan-Con < From KickFlip, To WeFlip >' on February 28. On March 2, JYP Entertainment announced that Amaru who is on hiatus, will not participate in the release, as he will be prioritising his health and recovery. On March 6, KickFlip the title of their fourth EP, My First Kick, after which they released the single "Twenty" on March 9 and timetable for the aforementioned My First Kick the following day. On March 30, they released multiple teasers for the title track "Eye-Poppin'", which was slated for release on April 6 alongside the EP.

== Track listing ==
My First Kick track listing
No.	Title	Lyrics	Music	Arrangement	Length
1.	"Eye-Poppin'" (눈에 거슬리고 싶어)	Kyehoon; Gxxdkelvin; Kass	Kass; Gxxdkelvin; Tim Tan; Kyehoon	Kass	2:42
2.	"Twenty"	Jo Yoon-kyung	JayJay; Perklee; Young Chance; Junny; Donghyeon	JayJay; Perklee	3:10
3.	"Stupid"	Xydo; Saay (Soultriii); Donghwa; Donghyeon	Garden; Hitbypitch; Xydo; Saay; Donghwa	Garden; Hitbypitch	2:36
4.	"Backward" (거꾸로)	Kass; Kyehoon	Kass	Kass	2:12
5.	"Scroll"	Nox (153/Joombas); Yi Yi-jin; Kirby (Papermaker); Seo Yong-won (153/Joombas)	Alawn; Joh!; Su Hyuk; Minje	Alawn	3:03
6.	"Roar"	J14 (Full8loom); Donghwa; Kyehoon	Stian Nyhammer Olsen; Adrian McKinnon; Anne Judith Wik	Olsen	2:47
7.	"My Direction"	Kelbyul (153/Joombas); Danke; Cho Yu-ri; Yi; Ellie Suh (153/Joombas); Donghwa; Kyehoon	Rasmus Palmgren; Jop Pangemanan; Kristin Langsrud; Lua (BADX)	Raz Palm	3:05
Total length:					19:35

Notes

- "Stupid" is stylized as "Stup!d".

== Personnel ==
Musicians

- KickFlip – lead vocals
- Kass – background vocals (1,4), vocal direction (1, 4), guitar (1, 4), bass (1, 4), drums (1, 4), keyboards (1, 4), synthesizer (1, 4)
- Gxxdkelvin – background vocals (1), vocal direction (1)
- Young Chance – vocal direction (2)
- Junny – background vocals (2)
- Park Woo-jeong – guitar (2)
- Kang Dong-ha – keyboards (2)
- Xydo – background vocals (3), vocal direction (3)
- Garden – background vocals (3), vocal direction (3), drums (3)
- Hitbypitch – vocal direction (3), keyboards (3), synthesizer (3)
- Bang In-jae – guitar (3), bass (3)
- Joh! – background vocals (5)
- C'SA – vocal direction (5)
- Alawn – guitar (5), bass (5), drums (5), synthesizer (5)
- Young Chance – background vocals (6), vocal direction (6)
- Adrian McKinnon – background vocals (6)
- Stian Nyhammer Olsen – bass (6), drums (6), keyboards (6), synthesizer (6)
- Luke – background vocals (7)
- Jinli (Full8loom) – background vocals (7), vocal direction (7)
- Rasmus Palmgren – guitar (7), bass (7), drums (7), keyboards (7), synthesizer (7), piano (7)

Technical

- Lee Chang-hoon – digital editing (1, 5), recording (1, 5, 6)
- Lee Kyung-won – digital editing (2, 7)
- Goo Hye-jin – digital editing (3, 4), recording (2–4, 7)
- Ahn Changkyu – digital editing (6)
  - Ha Tae-won – digital editing assistant (6)
- Lim Chan-mi – recording (2)
- Seo Eun-il – recording (3)
- Adam Hawkins – mixing (1)
- Uncle Joe – mixing (2, 3)
  - Kang Dong-ho – mixing assistant (2, 3)
- Stay Tuned – mixing (4)
- Alawn – mixing (5)
- Gu Jong-pil – mixing (6), Dolby Atmos mixing (all)
- Kim Dong-il – mix engineered (6)
- Yoon Won-kwon – mixing (7)
- Kwon Nam-woo – mastering (all)
  - Yoo Eun-jin – mastering assistant (all)
- Odal Park – Dolby Atmos mixing (all)

Locations

- JYPE Studios – digital editing (1, 3–5), recording (all)
- ONR Studio – digital editing (6)
- Periscope Sound – mixing (1)
- JoeLab – mixing (2, 3)
- Stay Tuned Studio – mixing (4)
- Alawn Music Studios – mixing (5)
- Klang Studio – mixing (6), Dolby Atmos mixing (all)
- Madmiix – mixing (7)
- 821 Sound Mastering – mastering (all)

== Charts ==
=== Weekly charts ===
Weekly chart performance for My First Kick
Chart (2026)	Peak position
Japanese Albums (Oricon)	42
Japanese Combined Albums (Oricon)	33
South Korean Albums (Circle)	1

=== Monthly charts ===
Monthly chart performance for My First Kick
Chart (2026)	Peak position
South Korean Albums (Circle)	11

== Release history ==
Release history for My First Kick
Region	Date	Format	Label
South Korea	April 6, 2026	CD	JYP
Various	April 6, 2026	Digital download; streaming	JYP
