= Twenty (KickFlip song) =

Single by KickFlip

from the EP My First Kick
- Language: Korean
- Released: March 9, 2026
- Length: 3:10
- Label: JYP
- Composers: DongHyeon, JayJay, Perklee, Young Chance, Junny
- Lyricist: Jo Yoon-kyung

KickFlip singles chronology
"My First Love Song" (2025)	"Twenty" (2026)	"Eye-Poppin'" (2026)

Music video
- "Twenty" on YouTube

"Twenty" is a song recorded by South Korean boy group KickFlip for their fourth extended play, My First Kick. It was released by JYP Entertainment as a pre-release single on March 9, 2026.

Professional ratings
Review scores
Source	Rating
IZM	3/5 stars

== Background and release ==
KickFlip first revealed they would have a comeback with a pre-release single and a new mini album at their fan concert '2026 KickFlip Fan-Con < From KickFlip, To WeFlip >' on February 28. On March 2, JYP Entertainment announced that Amaru who is on hiatus, will not participate in the release, as he will be prioritising his health and recovery.

== Composition ==
"Twenty" was written by Jo Yoon-kyung and composed by DongHyeon, JayJay, Perklee, Young Chance and Junny. The song is characterised by a speedy sound, and the lyrics contain complex and subtle feelings of excitement and regret for a new beginning. The song is composed in the key C-sharp Major and has 145 beats per minute and a running time of 3 minutes and 10 seconds.

== Promotion ==
KickFlip first performed "Twenty" on Mnet M Countdown show on March 12. KickFlip also performed on four other music programs in the first week of promotion: Music Bank on March 13 Show! Music Core, on March 14, SBS's Inkigayo on March 15 and MBC M's Show Champion on March 18.

== Music video ==
The music video shows the members in many locations such as a record shop, aquarium, and skateboard park. From the vintage sensibility everywhere in the alleys to the dreamy atmosphere under the blue water, it expresses the story of a brilliant youth, which is cheerful and playful. It was directed by Hobin.

== Charts ==
=== Weekly chart ===
Weekly chart performance for "Twenty"
Chart (2026)	Peak positions
South Korea Download (Circle)	11

=== Monthly chart ===
Chart (March 2026)	Peak position
South Korea Download (Circle)	57

== Release history ==
Release history for "Twenty"
Region	Date	Format	Label
Various	March 9, 2026	Digital download; streaming	JYP
