= Largest cities in Rio Grande do Sul by population =

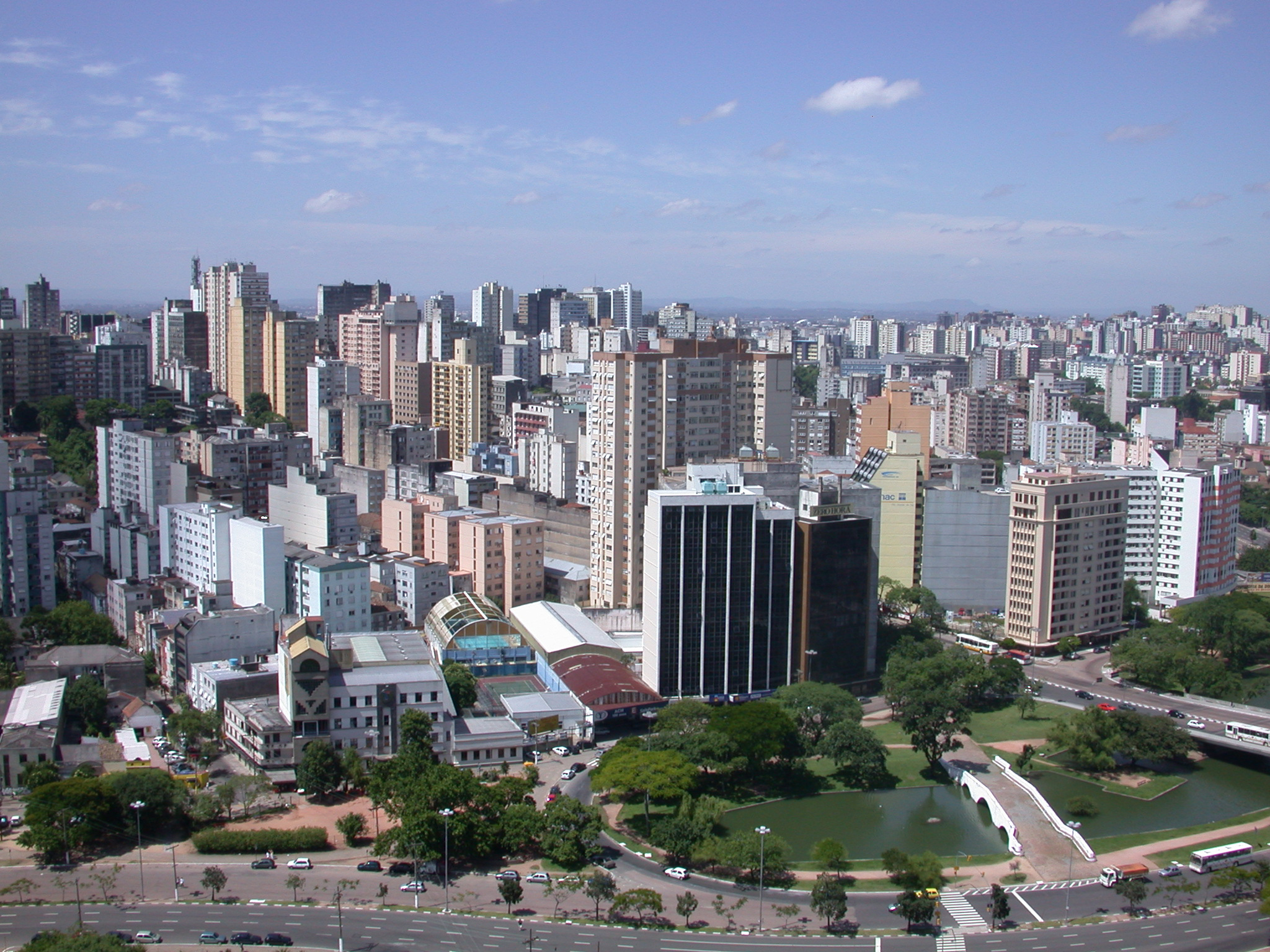
1 - Porto Alegre

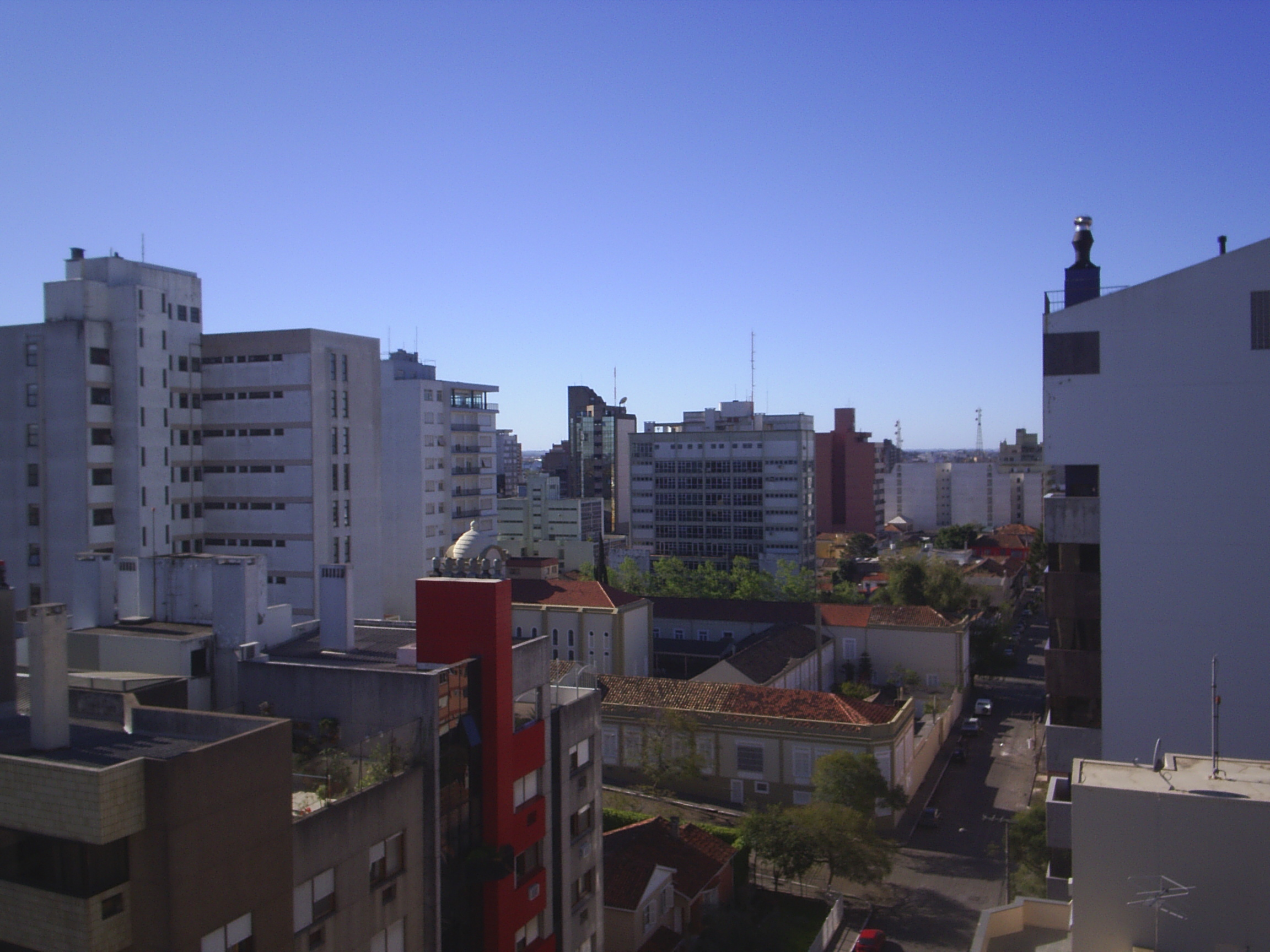
3 - Pelotas

6 - Santa Maria

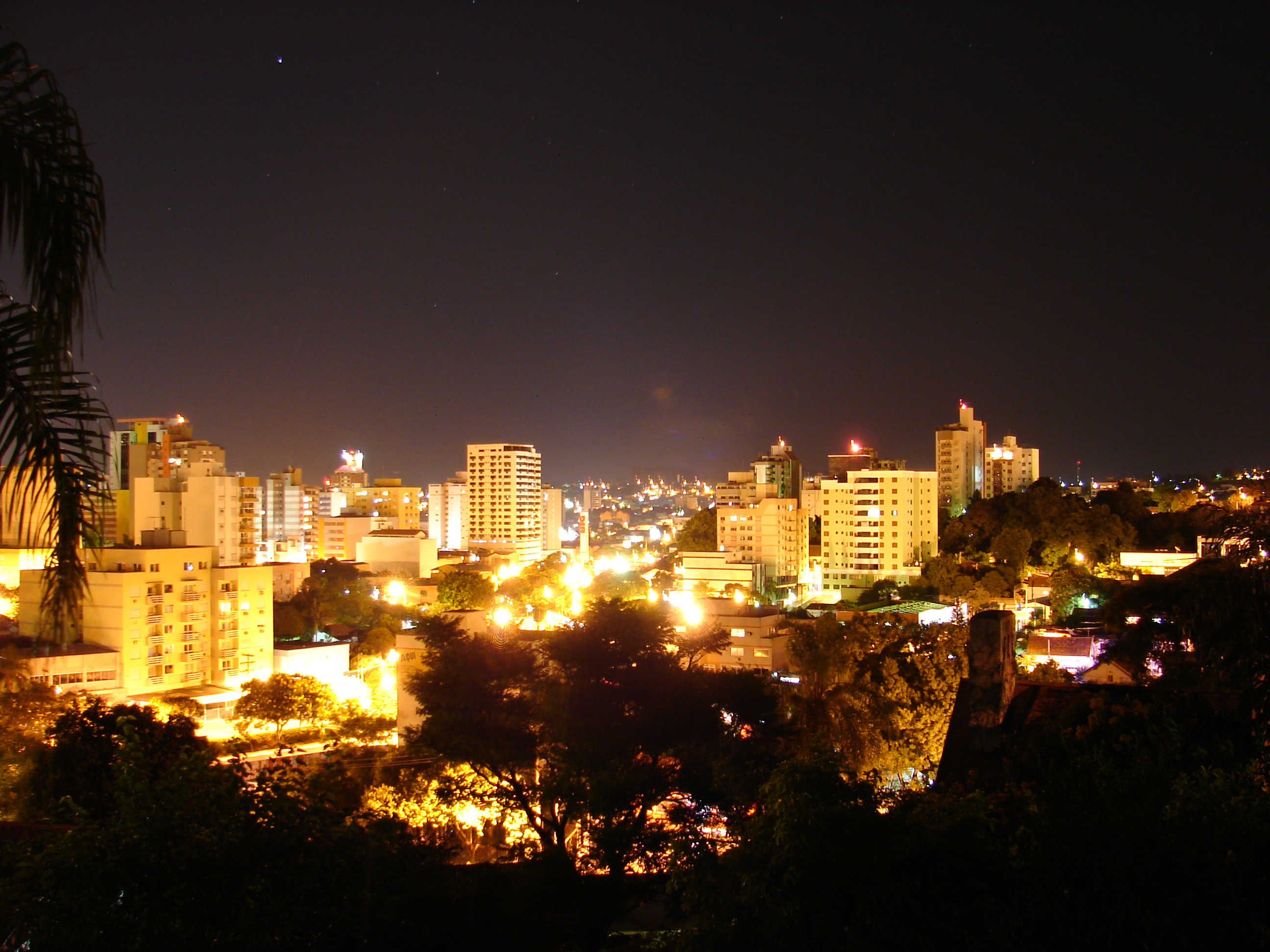
8 - Novo Hamburgo

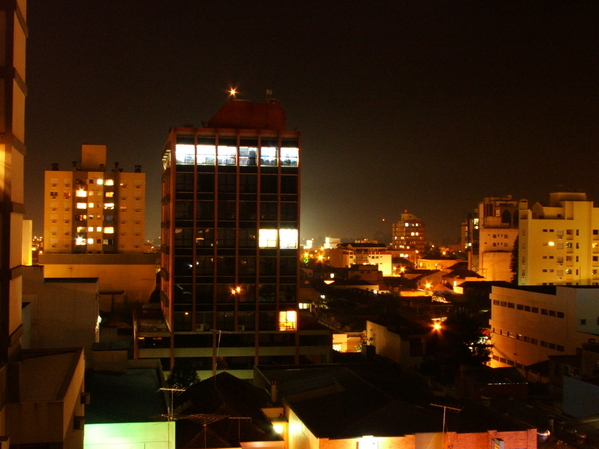
10 - São Leopoldo

Largest cities in the state of Rio Grande do Sul, Brazil by population, in descending order:

Rank	City	Population (2006 est.)	Land Area km^{2}.	Population Density per km^{2}.	Region
1	Porto Alegre	1,440,939	497	2816	Porto Alegre
2	Caxias do Sul	412,053	1644	251	Northeast
3	Pelotas	346,452	1610	215	Southeast
4	Canoas	333,322	131	2543	Porto Alegre
5	Gravataí	270,763	498	544	Porto Alegre
6	Santa Maria	270,073	1823	152	West Central
7	Viamão	261,970	1494	175	Porto Alegre
8	Novo Hamburgo	258,754	224	1155	Porto Alegre
9	Alvorada	214,953	71	3035	Porto Alegre
10	São Leopoldo	212,498	102	2077	Porto Alegre
11	Rio Grande	196,982	2814	70	Southeast
12	Passo Fundo	188,302	780	241	Northeast
13	Uruguaiana	136,364	5716	24	Southwest
14	Sapucaia do Sul	135,956	59	2318	Porto Alegre
15	Bagé	122,461	4096	30	Southwest
16	Cachoeirinha	121,880	44	2785	Porto Alegre
17	Santa Cruz do Sul	119,803	733	163	East Central
18	Guaíba	105,808	377	281	Porto Alegre
19	Bento Gonçalves	104,423	277	377	Northeast
20	Erechim	100,251	431	233	Northeast
21	Santana do Livramento	98,681	6950	14	Southwest
22	Cachoeira do Sul	89,669	3735	24	East Central
23	Alegrete	88,513	7804	11	Southwest
24	Esteio	87,070	28	3225	Porto Alegre
25	Santo Ângelo	80,117	680	118	Northwest
26	Ijuí	79,575	689	115	Northwest
27	Sapiranga	78,996	138	572	Porto Alegre
28	Santa Rosa	69,989	490	143	Northwest
29	Cruz Alta	69,067	1360	51	Northwest
30	São Borja	67,788	3616	19	Southwest
31	Lajeado	67,557	90	751	East Central
32	Venâncio Aires	67,373	773	87	East Central
33	Camaquã	64,338	1680	38	Porto Alegre
34	Farroupilha	62,966	362	174	Northeast
35	São Gabriel	62,543	5020	12	Southwest
36	Vacaria	62,261	2124	29	Northeast
37	Carazinho	61,973	665	93	Northwest
38	Montenegro	60,551	420	144	Porto Alegre
39	Taquara	60,481	457	132	Porto Alegre
40	Campo Bom	58,558	61	960	Porto Alegre
41	Parobé	54,223	109	497	Porto Alegre
42	Canguçu	52,245	3525	15	Southeast
43	Santiago	52,007	2413	22	West Central
44	São Lourenço do Sul	45,483	2036	22	Southeast
45	Itaqui	42,842	3404	13	Southwest
46	Dom Pedrito	42,151	5192	8	Southwest
47	Rosário do Sul	41,497	4370	9	Southwest
48	Osório	40,626	663	61	Porto Alegre
49	Estância Velha	40,263	52	774	Porto Alegre
50	Canela	40,147	255	157	Porto Alegre
