= Freeze (KickFlip song) =

Single by KickFlip

from the EP Kick Out, Flip Now!
- Language: Korean
- Released: May 26, 2025
- Length: 2:37
- Label: JYP
- Composers: DongHyeon, Rick Bridges, Young Chance, hitbypitch, Garden
- Lyricists: DongHwa, Kyehoon, Minje, gxxdkelvin, Kim Chae Ah, Lee Eun Hwa, Lee Aeng Du, Yoon Chae (Mumw), Goo Yeo Reum, B&NAz, Jinli, J14

KickFlip singles chronology
| "Mama Said" (2025) | "Freeze" (2025) | "Band-aid" (2025) |

Music video
- "Freeze" on YouTube

"Freeze" is a song recorded by South Korean boy group KickFlip for their second extended play Kick Out, Flip Now!. It was released by JYP Entertainment on May 26, 2025.

== Background and release ==
On May 2, 2025, JYP Entertainment first revealed that KickFlip will have their first comeback for May 26, with an EP called Kick Out Flip Now!, they released a trailer video and promotional schedule through the group's social media accounts. On May 5, it was shown through the track-list that "Freeze" would be the title track. Between May 7 to May 16, JYP Entertainment released concept photos for the comeback.

== Composition ==
"Freeze" lyrics were written by KickFlip members DongHwa, Kyehoon and Minje as well as gxxdkelvin, Kim Chae Ah, Lee Eun Hwa, Lee Aeng Du, Yoon Chae (Mumw), Goo Yeo Reum, B&NAz, Jinli and J14. It was composed by KickFlip member DongHyeon as well as Rick Bridges, Young Chance, hitbypitch and Garden.

"Freeze" is described as a hybrid dance track, marked by a guitar riff reminiscent of 1990s pop-punk songs and hyper-pop synthesizer sound with a standout chorus drop featuring Minje's ultra-low voice that hooks the listener's attention instantly. The song is composed in the key A-sharp Major and has 90 beats per minute and a running time of 2 minutes and 37 seconds.

== Promotion ==
KickFlip first performed "Freeze" on Mnet's M Countdown on May 29 followed by KBS's Music Bank on May 30 and on SBS's Inkigayo on June 1, June 8 and on June 15. They also performed on MBC M Show Champion on June 4 and MBC Show! Music Core on June 7.

== Music video ==
The music video shows the seven members of KickFlip run out of the tired school life into the dazzling sunshine. The freshness of a rookie and a refreshing sensibility are added, so you can enjoy the freedom that only teenagers can relate to. It was directed by Junyeop Lee.

== Charts ==
Weekly chart performance for "Freeze"
| Chart (2025) | Peak positions |
|---|---|
| South Korea Download (Circle) | 52 |

== Release history ==
Release history for "Freeze"
| Region | Date | Format | Label |
|---|---|---|---|
| Various | May 26, 2025 | Digital download; streaming | JYP |
