= Passo do Sabão =

Coordinates: 30°03.72′S 51°06.39′W

Passo do Sabão (English: Soap Dale or Soap Pass) is a Brazilian district within the municipality of Viamão, in Rio Grande do Sul. It belongs to the group of three districts predominantly urban, with Viamão and Viamópolis. Passo do Sabão is also a district with a large population, with about 41% of the inhabitants of the municipality.

== The origin of the district ==
In 1895, the municipality of Viamão was divided into districts by administrative act: Viamão, Estiva, Itapuã and Lombas. In the course of decades, and because of political changes, the nomenclature and number of districts have been modified. In December 1953, the district in Passo do Sabão was created, which covered the western section of the municipality.

== The district and the population ==
In the 1960s, industrial development in the municipality of Porto Alegre elevated the participation of secondary and tertiary sectors in the regional economy. This process provided a significant increase in the flow of migrant workers which left the inner cities to the capital in order to obtain better working conditions. The difficulty imposed by the city of Porto Alegre in the marketing of lots conducted this population to outlying regions and the neighboring municipalities, where the regulations were mild. Being situated on the banks of the road called the Mato Grosso, Passo do Sabão became attractive, and has received an increasing number of families.

=== Urban zone ===
The urban area of the Passo do Sabão covers most of the district. While retaining good in infrastructure and trade developed in some areas, the district also suffers the lack of basic items such as sanitation in several places.

==== Commercial development ====
The region for further development in the district is composed of the Santa Isabel and Santa Cecilia subdivisions, where commercial activity has developed by small businesses since the 1950s. In 1980, the region became the second most developed area of the municipality. The location of the district and its large population attracted major companies in the services sector.

==== The Infrastructure in peripheral settlements ====
Passo do Sabão, on the other hand, lacks infrastructure in their peripheral regions. In Augusta Marina and Augusta Fiel settlements, most households are not connected to sewage networks. The lack of sanitation programs leads to population to dump the debris of their houses in the open streets, which flow without treatment to the streams region, thus polluting soil and environment. The neglect of the population is also degrading the streams that cross these blends. In Augusta Marina, Cantegril and Santa Cecília streams receive large amounts of garbage, which together with the geography of the region, its raining cause numerous disorders such as floods.

==== The floodplains ====
With a geography low and flat areas around the Teodoro Luis de Castro street in Augusta Meneguini village suffer from waterlogging and flooding. Owned by region of a former swamp, the blending part of watershed the Feijó stream and is the meeting point of its five tributaries:

- Dornelinhos stream;
- Cantegril stream;
- Santa Cecilia stream;
- Seminario stream;
- Morro Santana stream.

=== Rural zone ===
The countryside of the Passo do Sabão covers a small area in the region northeast of district.

== The political losses ==
The district in Passo do Sabão suffered losses during the 1990s in its political geography.

=== Viamópolis ===
In 1991, the then mayor of Viamão Jorge Chiden, signed a new decree, which was intended to reshape the political administrative division in the municipality. Then came the district of Viamópolis in region which then corresponded to the southeastern portion of the Passo do Sabão.

=== Parque Índio Jari ===
In December 1995, the state government issued the decree in order to annex part of Parque Índio Jari settlement to the city of Porto Alegre. With this, the Passo do Sabão lost an area, which previously belonged to the northern end of the district.

== See also ==
- Viamão
- Alvorada
