= Eye-Poppin' =

Single by KickFlip

from the EP My First Kick
- Language: Korean
- Released: April 6, 2026
- Length: 2:42
- Label: JYP
- Composers: Kass, Tim Tan, Kyehoon, gxxdkelvin
- Lyricists: Kyehoon, Kass, gxxdkelvin

KickFlip singles chronology
"Twenty" (2026)	"Eye-Poppin'" (2026)	"Puzzle Piece" (2026)

Music video
- "Eye-Poppin'" on YouTube

"Eye-Poppin'" is a song recorded by South Korean boy group KickFlip for their fourth extended play My First Kick. It was released by JYP Entertainment on April 6, 2026.

== Background and release ==
On March 6, KickFlip revealed the title of their fourth EP called My First Kick, after which they released their pre-release single "Twenty" on March 9. JYP Entertainment released the timetable for the My First Kick the following day on KickFlip's social media pages. On March 30, they released multiple teasers for "Eye-Poppin", which was then released on April 6 alongside the EP.

== Composition ==
"Eye-Poppin'" was written by Kyehoon, Kass and gxxdkelvin and composed by Kass, Tim Tan, Kyehoon and gxxdkelvin. "Eye-Poppin'" is described as a hyper-punk dance song. The song is composed in the key C-sharp Minor and has 91 beats per minute and a running time of 2 minutes and 42 seconds.

== Promotion ==
KickFlip first performed "Eye Poppin'" on Mnet M Countdown show on April 9. KickFlip also performed on three other music programs in the first week of promotion: Music Bank on April 10 Show! Music Core, on April 11, and SBS's Inkigayo on April 12.

== Accolades ==
Music program awards for "Eye Poppin'"
Program	Date	Ref.
Show Champion	April 15, 2026	
Music Bank	April 17, 2026	

== Charts ==
=== Weekly chart ===
Weekly chart performance for "Eye-Poppin'"
Chart (2026)	Peak positions
South Korea Download (Circle)	4

=== Monthly chart ===
Chart (April 2026)	Peak position
South Korea Download (Circle)	43

== Release history ==
Release history for "Eye-Poppin'"
Region	Date	Format	Label
Various	April 6, 2026	Digital download; streaming	JYP
