= Mama Said (KickFlip song) =

Single by KickFlip

from the EP Flip It, Kick It!
- Language: Korean
- Released: January 20, 2025
- Length: 2:57
- Label: JYP
- Composers: Julia Bognar Finnseter (Blueprint), Henrik Heaven, Kristin Langsrud, Adam Kapit, Tommy Park, Jeremy Tay Jasper
- Lyricists: Kevin_D (D_answer), Catcher (153/Joombas), Song Cherry (153/Joombas), Amaru, E.Jean (Artiffect), Four Seasons (153/Joombas), Kass, Mun Yeo-reum (Jamfactory), Kang Se-bi (153/Joombas), Zior Park, Lee Yoon-seol (Jamfactory)

KickFlip singles chronology
"Umm Great" (2025)	"Mama Said" (2025)	"Freeze" (2025)

Music video
- "Mama Said" on YouTube

"Mama Said" is a song recorded by South Korean boy group KickFlip for their first extended play Flip It, Kick It!. It was released by JYP Entertainment on January 20, 2025.

== Background and release ==
On November 21, 2024, during the 2024 MAMA Awards in Los Angeles, JYP Entertainment founder Park Jin-young announced that they are in the "final stages of preparation" for their upcoming boy group, and revealed a silhouetted image of its seven members. On November 22, it was announced that the group would be called KickFlip.

They released a pre release single "Umm Great" on January 6. On January 15, JYP posted an album track list image and track spoiler video on Kickflip's official social media accounts in which "Mama Said" was revealed to be the title track. The music video teasers were released on January 15 and 16.

== Composition ==
"Mama Said" lyrics were written by KickFlip member Amaru as well as Kevin_D (D_answer), Catcher (153/Joombas), Song Cherry (153/Joombas), E.Jean (Artiffect), Four Seasons (153/Joombas), Kass, Mun Yeo-reum (Jamfactory), Kang Se-bi (153/Joombas), Zior Park and Lee Yoon-seol (Jamfactory). It was composed by Julia Bognar Finnseter (Blueprint), Henrik Heaven, Kristin Langsrud, Adam Kapit, Tommy Park and Jeremy Tay Jasper.

"Mama Said" is described as being energetic and a rebellious anthem about following one's own path despite criticism. The song is composed in the key B Major and has 144 beats per minute and a running time of 2 minutes and 57 seconds.

== Promotion ==
KickFlip held their debut stage for "Mama Said" on Mnet M Countdown on January 23. KickFlip also performed on three other music programs in the first week of promotion: Music Bank on January 24, Show! Music Core, on January 25 and SBS's Inkigayo on January 26.

== Music video ==
This music video, which contains the message 'I don't care about obvious nagging and go my way', produced an energetic performance and energetic performance of the free-wim members such as blowing hamburgers with a big swing or making birds from trees in the garden. It was directed by Junyeop Lee of Keepusweird.

== Charts ==
Weekly chart performance for "Mama Said"
Chart (2025)	Peak positions
South Korea Download (Circle)	12

=== Monthly charts ===
Chart (January 2025)	Peak position
South Korea Download (Circle)	61

== Release history ==
Release history for "Mama Said"
Region	Date	Format	Label
Various	January 20, 2025	Digital download; streaming	JYP
