= Umm Great =

Single by KickFlip

from the EP Flip It, Kick It!
- Language: Korean
- Released: January 6, 2025
- Length: 2:21
- Label: JYP
- Composer: Kass
- Lyricists: Amaru; Kass; Donghwa

KickFlip singles chronology
"Umm Great" (2025)	"Mama Said" (2025)

Music video
- "Umm Great" on YouTube

"Umm Great" is a song recorded by South Korean boy group KickFlip for their first extended play Flip It, Kick It!. It was released by JYP Entertainment on January 6, 2025, as a pre-debut single.

Professional ratings
Review scores
Source	Rating
IZM	2/5 stars

== Background and release ==
On January 5, 2025 JYP Entertainment first announced that KickFlip will release a pre release single entitled "Umm Great". It was released a day later alongside its music video, which was directed by Ximin Oh of Aedastudio.

== Composition ==
"Umm Great" lyrics were written by KickFlip members Amaru and Donghwa, as well as producer Kass who also composed and arranged the song. The song is composed in the key C Major and has 100 beats per minute and a running time of 2 minutes and 21 seconds. The lyrics is about confidently pushing back against unwanted advice and staying determined to follow one's own path.

== Promotion ==
KickFlip performed "Umm Great" and their debut single "Mama Said" on January 23 on Mnet's M Countdown and on SBS's Inkigayo on January 26.

== Charts ==
Weekly chart performance for "Umm Great"
Chart (2025)	Peak positions
South Korea Download (Circle)	27

=== Monthly charts ===
Chart (January 2025)	Peak position
South Korea Download (Circle)	88

== Publication lists ==
Publication lists for "Umm Great"
Publication	List	Rank	Ref.
Billboard	The 25 Best K-Pop Songs of 2025 (So Far): Critic's Picks	16	
Billboard	The 25 Best K-Pop Songs of 2025: Staff Picks	17	

== Release history ==
Release history for "Umm Great"
Region	Date	Format	Label
Various	January 6, 2025	Digital download; streaming	JYP
