= Ariel Nan =

Argentine musician, singer, songwriter and actor

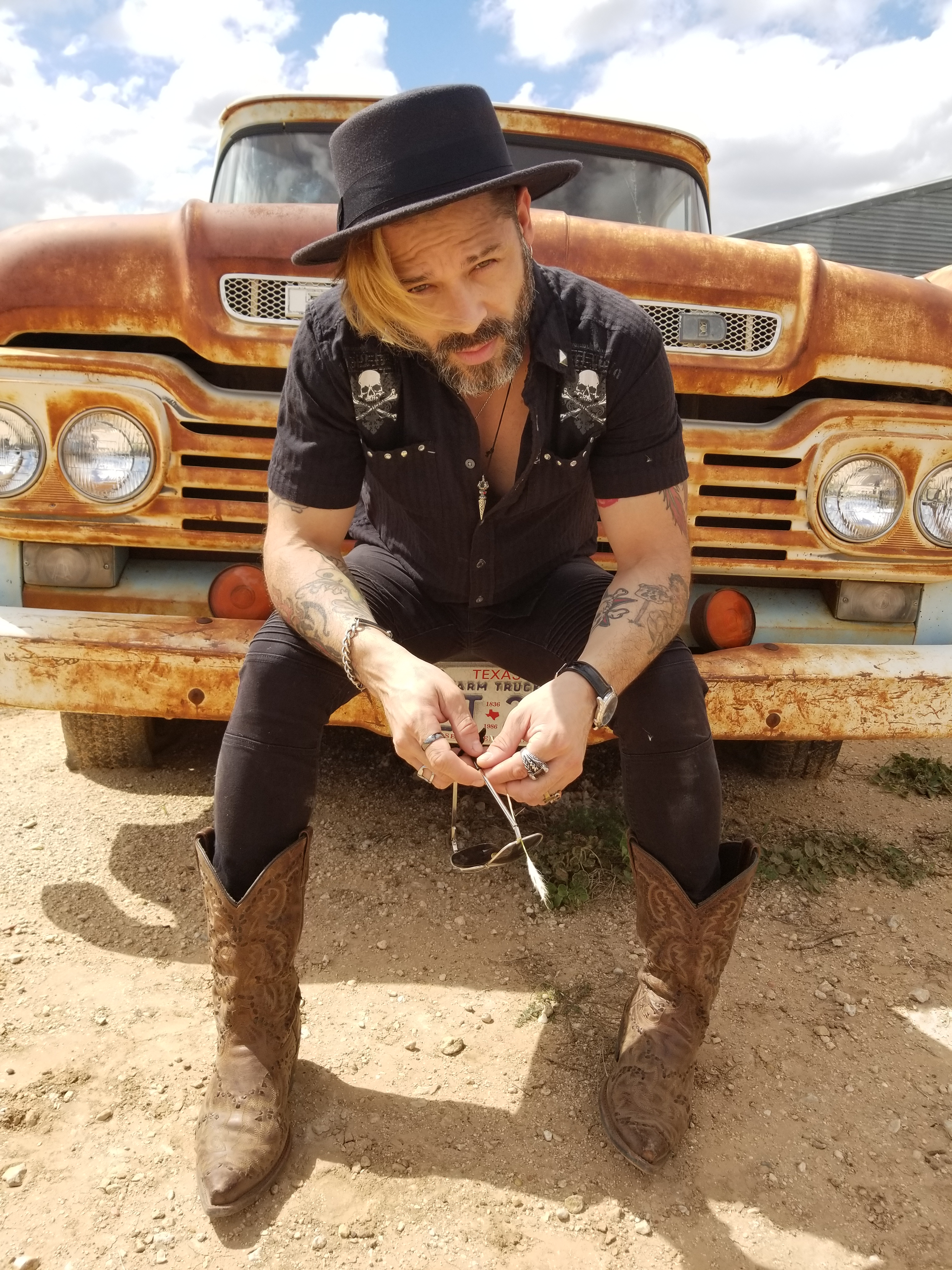
- Ariel Nan in 2020

Background information
- Also known as: Ariel Nan
- Born: Ariel Hernán Morel; December 9, 1979 (age 46); Buenos Aires, Argentina
- Genres: Rock, Latin pop, Blues, Metal
- Occupations: Singer-songwriter, actor
- Instruments: Guitar, harmonica
- Years active: 1997–present
- Website: arielnan.blogspot.com

Ariel Nan (Ariel Hernán Morel born in Monte Grande, Buenos Aires Province, December 9, 1979) is an Argentine musician, singer, songwriter and actor.

== Career ==
Nan started his career as a singer when he was a teenager because he had his first band when he was thirteen years old. The members of the band were much older than him. They discovered Nan's talent when they listened to him in the chorus of the Church. When he was eighteen, he travelled to United States after receiving an important offer which carried on the musical lifestyle.

He had his own first group of music named Hake Rock, which lasted only for four years and had a particular style because it seemed to be bands of Rock such as Guns N' Roses, Bon Jovi and Whitesnake. As a consequence of this band, he could record a solo which was "Play".

In 2010 he had his first own solo as a composer ad singer in his album called "Un Nuevo Camino". Its songs were such as "Cómo olvidar", "Tú y yo", "Hasta el fin" and "La puerta del amor" from Nino Bravo; which sounded in some radio programmes from Latin America. At the beginning of 2011 he produced his videoclip "Realidades" and it was shown in different musical channels. This song was adopted from the Chilean Association "No Más" to fight for the Bullying Women Rights in that country.

He made his acting debut in March 2011. He was the main character of Moonlighter, the film written by Michael Snyder and directed by Pablo Arriola. The film was about Kris´life, an ideal man for any woman. He was a psychopath. He acted with Karina Mohor, one of the youngest talents in Telemundo channel. This film was chosen to participate in one of the most important cinema festivals like Cannes Festival, Gold Lion Festival from Africa, Cinema Festival in Marbella 2011 or the HBO Production.

In the middle of 2011, he became part of the well known play "Joseph and the amazing technicolor dreamcoat" (José, el soñador) and he acted as Levi, one of the main characters in this Broadway music hall, written by Andrew Lloyd Webber. This play was presented in Miami Dade Auditorium.

In 2012, he performed his EP named "Esencia", which was recorded in the Ingenious Tunes Studios. This album includes great songs, such as "Realidades", "No te Irás", "Miedos", "Nocturnal", "Enloqueciendo" and some videoclips like "Realidades", "Nocturnal" y "No te irás". This one was visual directed by NIA Films, who worked in videos from Don Omar, Olga Tañon, Wisin & Yandel.

== Discography ==
- Un Nuevo Camino (2010)
- Esencia (EP) (2012)
- Juego Cruel (Single) (2014)
- Hielo en el alma (Single) (2015)
- Sexy (2015)
- Historias Sin Tiempo (2016)
- Until the en of Time (Single) (2018)
- Is not Mine (EP) (2018)
- Soy Aquel (Single) (2019)
- Amor De Mi Vida (Single) (2020)
- La Era Del Rock (Single) (2020)
- Descontrolando (Single) (2020)
- Vivo mi vida por vos (Single) (2020)
- Dimension (Album) (2020)
- Como Un Tonto (Single) (2021)
- Vivir Algo Contigo (Single) (2022)

(2025)

- Esas viejas canciones (Single) (2025)

== Filmography ==
- Moonlighter (2011)
- Pegasus (2018)
- The Roomie (2021)
- Volver A Empezar (2022)

== Theater ==
- José el Soñador (2011), Miami-Dade County Auditorium
- Cien veces no debo (2014), Teatro 8
- Solo Para Mujeres (2018)

== Awards ==
- Independent Music Award (2007) "Best Song"
- Premio Paoli (2008) "Best Male Voice in Florida"
- Gaviota de Oro (2010) "Best Foreign Artist"
- Critics Choice Awards (2010) "Excellence and Professionalism"
- Premios Juventud (2011) "Mejor Artista Rock"
- Critics Choice Awards (2011) "Influential Personality in Music"
- Fox Music Awards (2014) "Best Male voice of Rock"
- 226 Records Music Awards (2015) "Artist Of The Year"
- Premios Latinos 305 (2019) "A la Exelencia"
- Fox Music Awards (2019) "Rock Artist Of The Year"
- Premios Talento (2021) "Mejor Cancion Rock"
- BMI Songs InGrooves (2021) "Cancion Como Un Tonto"
- Premio Gaviota de Plata (2021) "Trayectoria"
- MLM Awards (2022) "Premio Extraordinario"
