= Itapuã State Park =

State park in Rio Grande do Sul, Brazil

- Parque Estadual de Itapuã
- IUCN category II (national park)
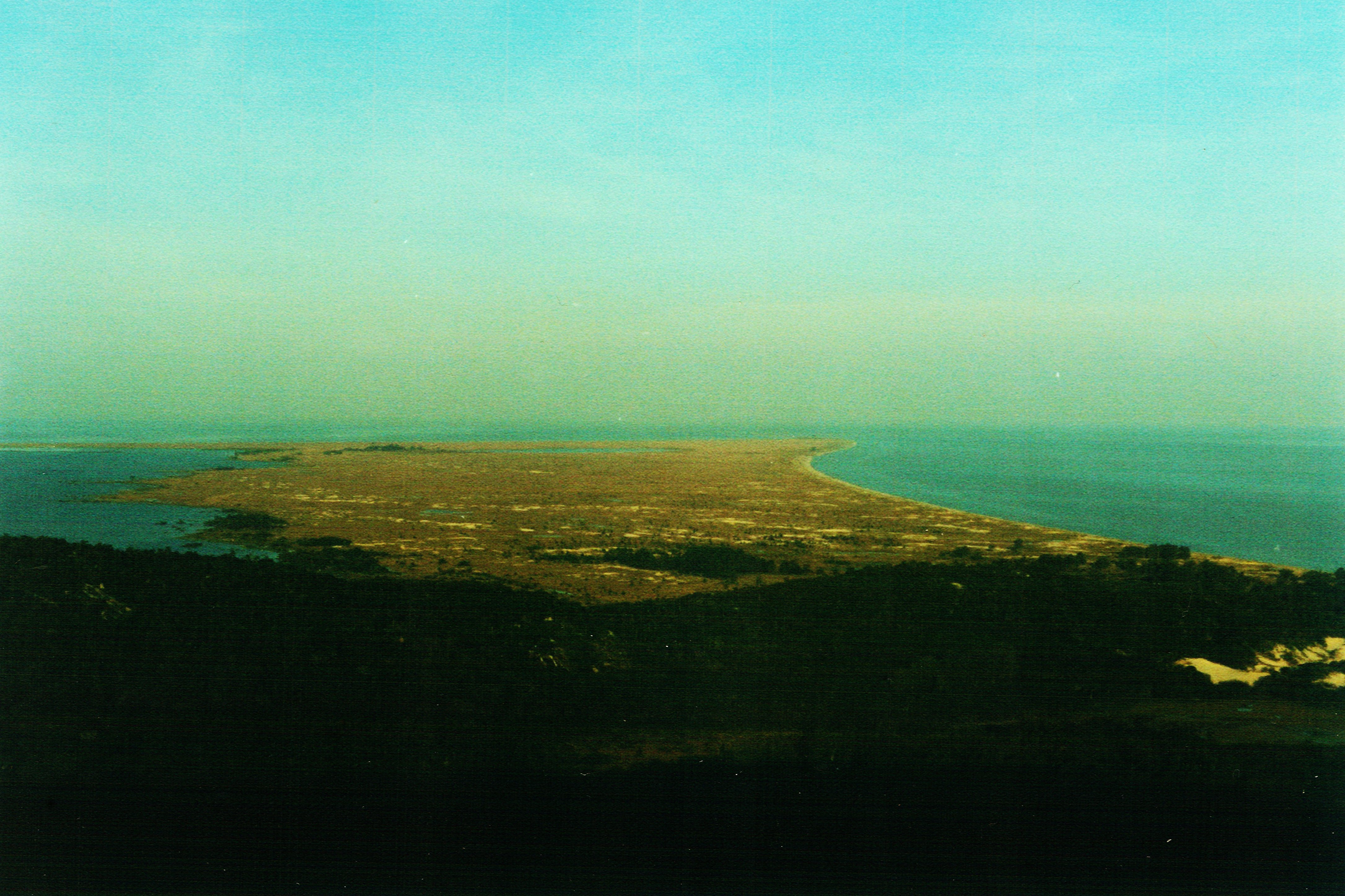
- View from the hill

- Location within Brazil
- Nearest city: Viamão, Rio Grande do Sul
- Coordinates: 30.368333°S 50.997778°W
- Area: 5,566.50 hectares (13,755.1 acres)
- Designation: State park
- Created: 11 March 1991
- Administrator: Secretaria do Ambiente e Desenvolvimento Sustentável

The Itapuã State Park (Portuguese: Parque Estadual de Itapuã) is a state park in the state of Rio Grande do Sul, Brazil. It protects a promontory to the east of the mouth of the Guaíba Lake where it enters the Patos Lagoon south of the state capital of Porto Alegre. The promontory contains samples of the original environment of the area, including a small lagoon, various historical relics, and beaches.

== Location ==
The Itapuã State Park is located in the south of the Itapuã District of the municipality of Viamão, Rio Grande do Sul. It is on a promontory bounded to the south and east by Patos Lagoon and to the west by Lake Guaíba. As of 1996 the park covered 5,566.50 hectares (13,755.1 acres). The park is 57 kilometres (35 mi) from Porto Alegre, the state capital. It has the objective of protecting natural beauty and resources, especially flora and fauna, and protecting sites of historical and archaeological value in the region.

== History ==
The word Itapuã is of Guarani origin, and means "rocky point". The area was formerly known as the Itapuã Promontory. The first European settlers arrived in 1733 and attempted farming. The land changed hands several times, at one time partly occupied by 60 families from the Azores, but was not fertile. Governor Ildo Meneghetti issued decree 8.190 of 1 October 1957 to define the southern part of the promontory, an area of 1,535 hectares (3,790 acres), as being public utility for expropriation purposes, but the decree was allowed to expire with no action taken.

The same 1,535 hectares (3,790 acres) of the southern part of the promontory were again declared of public use and expropriated by decree 22,535 of 14 July 1973. Governor Euclides Triches expropriated the land for the Itapuã Tourist Complex, which was to have resorts, handicraft centers, and to be used for recreational, cultural and leisure activities. It was administered by the state's tourism authority. The area was expanded to 3,783 hectares (9,350 acres) by decree 25.162 of 23 December 1976. The 1976 expropriation by Governor Sinval Guazzelli was to protect and preserve the landscapes of two additional areas.

However, the state government failed to protect the ecosystem and allowed quarrying, growth of unauthorized summer settlements and uncontrolled visits, which caused protests from environmentalists, scientists and others concerned about the environment. In 1984 the land was transferred to the Environment Department of the Secretariat of Health and Environment. An organization to fight for protection of the park was formed in 1985 with representatives of various civil society organizations. That year the quarries and illegal summer homes were closed down and researchers began to investigate the area.

The park was formally created by Governor Sinval Guazzelli by decree 33.886 of 11 March 1991. This decree expanded the protected area to cover 5,533 hectares (13,670 acres) including the Lagoa Negra (Black Lagoon). On 21 December 1993 the park was expanded by decree 36.016 to include the Pombas, Junco and Ponta Escura islands. The park was closed for over ten years to let its ecosystems recover and to build its administrative structure, and reopened in April 2002.

== Environment ==
The Köppen climate classification of the region is Cfa, with a humid subtropical climate, average temperature in the hottest month over 22 °C (72 °F) and temperatures in coldest month between −3 and 18 °C (27 and 64 °F). The average temperature is 17.5 °C (63.5 °F). Average annual rainfall is 1,300 millimetres (51 in). There is frequent fog.

The Itapuã State Park is in the pampas biome. It preserves one of the last remnants of the original environment of the Porto Alegre metropolitan area, between the waters of Lake Guaíba and Laguna de Patos. Environments include hills, beaches, dunes, lagoons and marshes. Fauna include the brown howler (Alouatta guariba), locally threatened with extinction, neotropical otter (Lontra longicaudis), margay (Leopardus wiedii) and migratory birds such as the buff-breasted sandpiper (Tryngites subruficollis) and tropical kingbird (Tyrannus melancholicus).

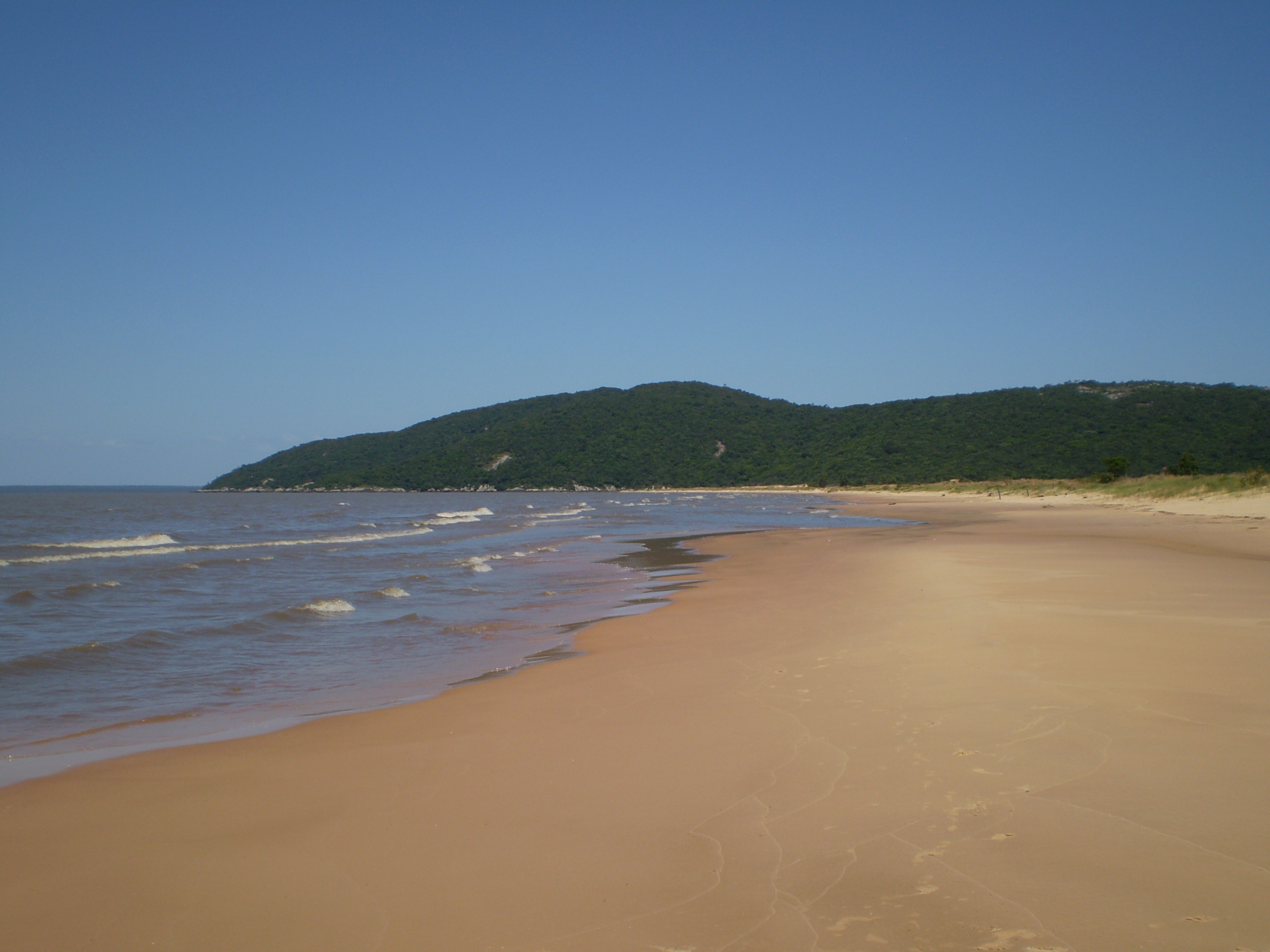
Fora beach, promontory in background

== Visiting ==
Normally the park is open from Wednesday to Sunday between 9am and 6pm, but closed on weekdays from 12am to 1:30pm. There is a limit of 350 people per day, and on Sundays many people are unable to enter. The park infrastructure includes bathrooms, changing rooms, parking and grills, but visitors must bring their own food and charcoal. Collection of firewood is prohibited. There are three beaches, but as of 2015 only one was open. Visitors may use the beaches to swim, but cannot take pets, play ball sports or ride bicycles.

The Visitor Center has a permanent photographic exhibition with images of the park. A small museum exhibits weapons and boat parts used by the combatants in the Ragamuffin War (Revolução Farroupilha) of 1835–45. There are historical relics from the war in the Morro da Fortaleza (Fortress Hill), Junco Island and the Ferraria dos Farrapos. The Itapuã Lighthouse, completed in 1860, stands where the waters of Lake Guaíba meet those of the Laguna dos Patos. Scheduled groups may receive a talk giving information about the park and its history. Guided tours of ecological trails may be arranged in advance.

== Sources ==
- Antonio, Margô Guadalupe; Castro, Rogério Guimarães Só de; Pilla, Janice Tschiedel; Silva, Carlos Porto da; Vasconcellos, Jane Maria de Oliveira (1996), Plano de Manejo Parque Estadual de Itapuã (PDF) (in Portuguese), Porto Alegre: Departamento de Recursos Naturais Renováveis
- Fritsch, Luis H. (31 October 2015), "O exuberante Parque Estadual de Itapuã", Trekking RS (in Portuguese)
- Guazzelli, Sinval (11 March 1991), Decreto n.º 33.886, de 11 de março de 1991 (PDF) (in Portuguese), Rio Grande doe Sol
- Parque Estadual de Itapuã (in Portuguese), SEMA/RS: Secretaria do Ambiente e Desenvolvimento Sustentável
