= Xamuel =

Brazilian rapper (born 2005)

- Born: Rick Samuel Mendes Duarte; December 18, 2005 (age 20); Viamão
- Genre: Rap music

Rick Samuel Mendes Duarte, known professionally as Xamuel (born December 18, 2005), is a Brazilian rapper. He first came to attention for his participation in rap battles. He was signed by Universal Music Brazil at age 17, and has since released two albums: Sangue! in 2025 and Presságios in 2026. He creates social media content: as of 2025, he had approximately 3,400,000 followers. He is also known for his androgynous fashion sense.

== Biography ==
Xamuel was born on December 18, 2005, and comes from Viamão. He was shy from a young age, and did not have many friends. At 11, however, he began participating in rap battles and becoming more outgoing. He won his first rap battle, and was awarded the opportunity to record his own song. He took the name Xamuel as his music name, due to him having difficulty pronouncing the name Samuel when he was younger and pronouncing it Xamuel instead, which he was frequently teased about. By 15, he was traveling the country and rapping. He sold garbage bags to pay for his bus trips.

Metrópoles has cited him as one of the earliest individuals to post rap battles to TikTok in Brazil, and a rap battle organizer has credited him and his videos with normalizing rap battles in Brazil. He went viral on TikTok for a partnership with a beauty brand: during the ad, he sings about avoiding beauty standards and makeup being gender-neutral. The campaign also resulted in online hate, but he did not recant it. According to Rolling Stone Brasil, a teaser for his song "Mortal para trás" also became a viral phenomenon. His first single, and the only one he released prior to being signed, was "Alguém Conseguiu Entender?" (transl. Did anyone understand?).

He was signed by Universal Music Brazil in December 2023. His first release with Universal was a single titled "Sozinho"; the music video for the release portrays his kidnapping by an obsessed fan. In 2025, he released the single "Cosmo e Wanda Freestyle", inspired by The Fairly OddParents. That same year, he won a boxing match against fellow rapper Jhony MC; Jhony MC had previously feuded with Xamuel through rap battles and insults to his style.

Later in 2025, he won the Batalha do Tanque, one of the largest rap battles in the country. Just a few days later, he released his first album, Sangue! In a press release, he stated the album was inspired by the idea of a court jester. He released his second album, Presságios, in 2026: he stated it was a "more thoughtful project" than his previous work.

He is known as "Príncipe do freestyle" (transl. The prince of freestyle). His rap frequently comes with an emphasis on social injustice, which he said was important to the genre. He further asserted that rap and hip hop is political and called for people to be careful about right-wing politicians who, he said, co-opt elements of rap for their campaigns despite, in his view, their ideas being antithetical to rap. As of 2025, he had 3,400,000 followers on TikTok. As of 2024, he also had more than 1,300,000 followers on Instagram. He was featured on Spotify's RADAR, a program for emerging artists.

He is also known for his androgynous style, featuring eyeliner, nail polish, and crop tops. He has received frequent online hate for this, but has stated that he has heard "ten times worse" during his rap battles.

== Discography ==
=== Albums ===
Title	Year	Reference
Sangue!	2025	
Presságios	2026	
