= KickFlip =

South Korean boy band

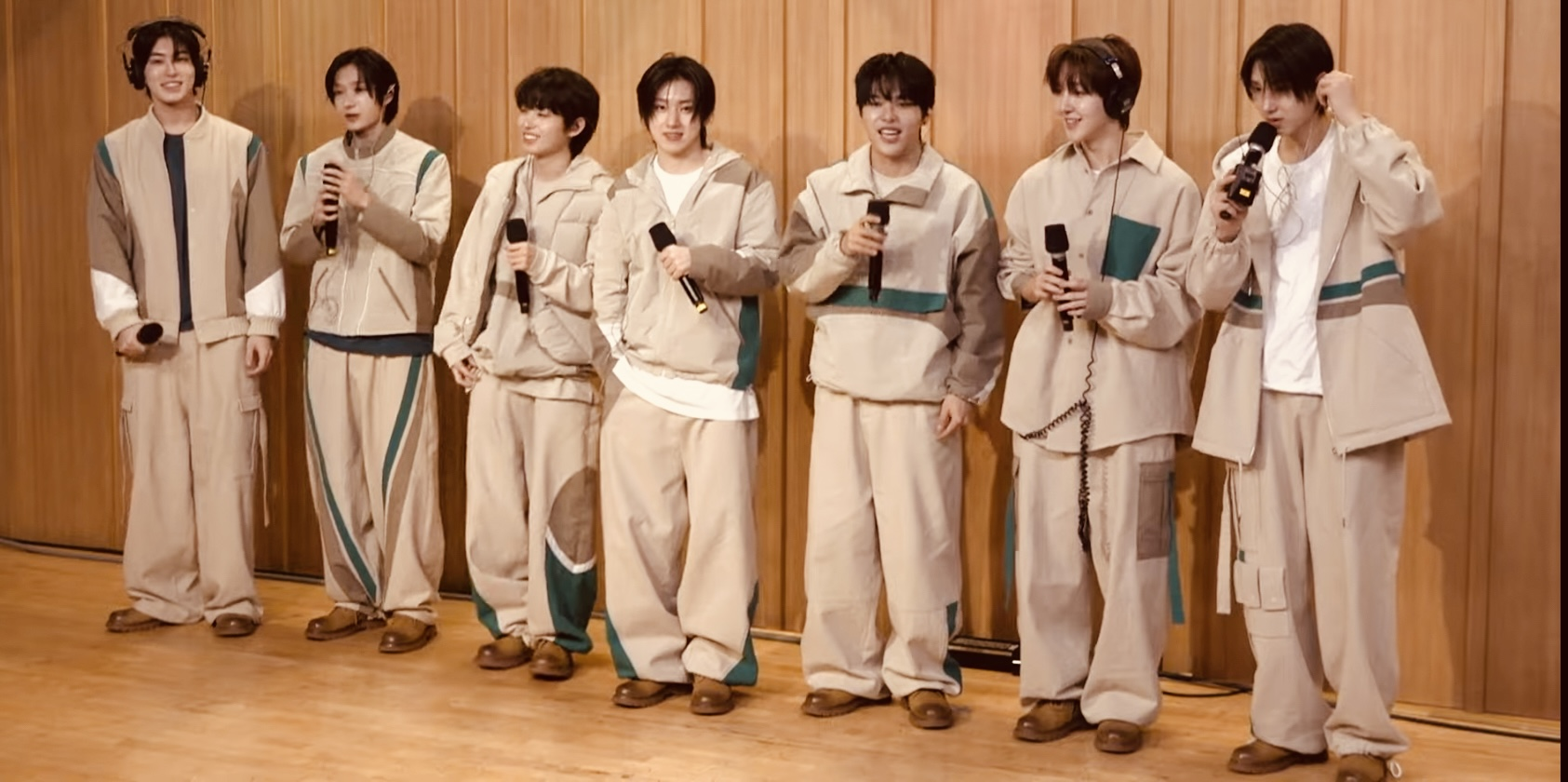
- KickFlip in February 2025

Background information
- Origin: Seoul, South Korea
- Genre: K-pop
- Years active: 2025–present
- Label: JYP
- Members: Kyehoon; Amaru; Donghwa; Juwang; Minje; Keiju; Donghyeon
- Website: kickflip.jype.com kick-flip.com

KickFlip (Korean: 킥플립) is a South Korean boy band formed through SBS's reality competition program Loud and managed by JYP Entertainment. The group consists of seven members: Kyehoon, Amaru, Donghwa, Juwang, Minje, Keiju, and Donghyeon. They debuted on January 20, 2025, with the extended play Flip It, Kick It!.

== Name ==
The group's name, KickFlip, refers to the skateboarding trick of the same name, which involves the rider making a full rotation along the board's long axis, symbolizing "the group's ambition to break conventions to deliver bold performances".

== History ==
=== Formation through Loud ===
KickFlip, alongside The New Six, were formed through the SBS K-pop reality competition program Loud, hosted by JYP Entertainment and P Nation. Loud premiered in June 2021 and ran till September, where Kyehoon, Keiju, Amaru, Lee Donghyeon and Yoon Min were selected as the members of JYP's new boy group. However, in April 2023, Yoon Min launched a personal Instagram account, seemingly confirming his departure from JYP Entertainment and its upcoming boy group. He later participated in Mnet's reality show Vocal Showdown in October 2023.

=== 2025–present: Debut with Flip It, Kick It! and Kick Out, Flip Now! ===
On November 21, 2024, during the 2024 MAMA Awards in Los Angeles, JYP Entertainment founder Park Jin-young announced that they are in the "final stages of preparation" for their upcoming boy group, and revealed a silhouetted image of its seven members. A day later, JYP announced the name of their new boy group, KickFlip, along with a debut date of January 1, 2025. Their debut was later postponed to January 6 as a response to the Jeju Air Flight 2216 crash. KickFlip released their first EP Flip It, Kick It! on January 20, alongside its lead single "Mama Said", and following the pre-release single "Umm Great" on January 6. On March 18, it was announced that KickFlip would be part of the lineup for Lollapalooza 2025 scheduled for August 2. Their second EP, Kick Out, Flip Now!, was released on May 26. On September 17, JYP Entertainment announced that Amaru will be suspending his activities for the time being due to anxiety. Their third EP, My First Flip, was released on September 22. KickFlip won their first music program award with "My First Love Song" on October 1, on Show Champion.

On December 2, JYP Entertainment announced that KickFlip will hold their first fan concert 'From KickFlip, To WeFlip' at the Blue Square SOL Travel Hall in Yongsan District, central Seoul, on January 17 and 18, 2026. A digital single of the same name was then released on January 20, to commemorate the group's first anniversary. KickFlip pre-released the single "Twenty" on March 9, their fourth EP My First Kick was released on April 6 alongside the lead single "Eye-Poppin'".

== Members ==
Adapted from KickFlip's official website.

- Kyehoon (계훈)
- Amaru (아마루)
- Donghwa (동화)
- Juwang (주왕)
- Minje (민제)
- Keiju (케이주)
- Donghyeon (동현)

== Discography ==
=== Extended plays ===
List of extended plays showing selected details, selected chart positions, sales figures and music recording certifications
Title	Details	Peak chart positions		Sales	Certifications
Title	Details	KOR	JPN	Sales	Certifications
Flip It, Kick It!	Released: January 20, 2025; Label: JYP; Formats: CD, digital download, streaming	1	43	KOR: 289,401; JPN: 1,961	KMCA: Platinum
Kick Out, Flip Now!	Released: May 26, 2025; Label: JYP; Formats: CD, digital download, streaming; Track listing: 1. "Freeze"; 2. "Skip It!"; 3. "Before the Sun Explodes"; 4. "Electricity"; 5. "Complicated!!"; 6. "Code Red"; 7. "How We KickFlip"	2	—	KOR: 314,903	KMCA: Platinum
My First Flip	Released: September 22, 2025; Label: JYP; Formats: CD, digital download, streaming; Track listing: 1. "My First Love Song"; 2. "Band-Aid"; 3. "Crush"; 4. "Tiki-taka"; 5. "Gas On It"; 6. "404:Not Found"; 7. "Secret Nightmare"	1	—	KOR: 401,209	—N/a
My First Kick	Released: April 6, 2026; Label: JYP; Formats: CD, digital download, streaming	1	42	KOR: 469,636; JPN: 743	—N/a
Kick Off the Wall Pt. 1	Released: October 6, 2026; Label: JYP; Formats: CD, digital download, streaming; Track listing: 1. "Puzzle Piece"; 2. "Kick Off the Wall" (featuring Iann Dior); 3. "0 (Young)"; 4. "Rockin'"; 5. "Hate Blueberry"; 6. "Drop In"; 7. "Waste It All with You"; 8. "Kick Off the Wall"	1	68	KOR: 523,133	—N/a
"—" denotes a recording that did not chart in that territory.

=== Singles ===
List of singles, showing year released, selected chart positions and name of the album
Title	Year	Peak chart positions	Album
Title	Year	KOR DL	Album
"Umm Great" (응 그래)	2025	27	Flip It, Kick It!
"Mama Said" (뭐가되려고?)	2025	12	Flip It, Kick It!
"Freeze"	2025	52	Kick Out, Flip Now!
"Band-Aid" (반창고)	2025	24	My First Flip
"My First Love Song" (처음 불러보는 노래)	2025	4	My First Flip
"Hyper Slide" (Note: Released as part of the special digital single "From KickFlip, To WeFlip")	2026	97	Non-album singles
"Good Night"	2026	173	Non-album singles
"Twenty"	2026	11	My First Kick
"Eye-Poppin'" (눈어 거슬리고 싶어)	2026	4	My First Kick
"Puzzle Piece"	2026	13	Kick Off the Wall Pt. 1
"Kick Off the Wall" (featuring Iann Dior)	2026	5	Kick Off the Wall Pt. 1

=== Soundtrack appearances ===
List of soundtrack appearances, showing year released, and name of the album
Title	Year	Peak chart positions	Album
Title	Year	KOR DL	Album
"Something Feels Wrong"	2026	91	To My Beloved Thief, Pt.2
"Everyday, Everynight"	2026	—	(Youth of Revelation X KickFlip) (Original Webtoon Soundtrack)- Single

=== Other charted songs ===
List of other charted songs, showing year released, selected chart positions and name of the album
Title	Year	Peak chart positions	Album
Title	Year	KOR DL	Album
"Warriors"	2025	30	Flip It, Kick It!
"Knock Knock"	2025	35	Flip It, Kick It!
"Like a Monster"	2025	37	Flip It, Kick It!
"See You on Tomorrow" (내일에서 만나)	2025	34	Flip It, Kick It!
"Skip it!"	2025	81	Kick Out, Flip Now!
"Before the Sun Explodes"	2025	80	Kick Out, Flip Now!
"Electricity"	2025	82	Kick Out, Flip Now!
"Complicated"	2025	83	Kick Out, Flip Now!
"Code Red"	2025	84	Kick Out, Flip Now!
"How We KickFlip"	2025	85	Kick Out, Flip Now!
"Crush" (특이점)	2025	32	My First Flip
"Tiki-Taka" (다시, 여기)	2025	52	My First Flip
"Gas On It"	2025	33	My First Flip
"404: Not Found"	2025	55	My First Flip
"Secret Nightmare" (악몽을 꿨던 건 비밀이지만)	2025	29	My First Flip
"Stupid"	2026	41	My First Kick
"Backward" (거꾸로)	2026	39	My First Kick
"Scroll"	2026	40	My First Kick
"Roar"	2026	43	My First Kick
"My Direction"	2026	38	My First Kick
"0 (Young)"	2026	16	Kick Off the Wall Pt. 1
"Rockin'"	2026	17	Kick Off the Wall Pt. 1
"Hate Blueberry"	2026	20	Kick Off the Wall Pt. 1
"Drop In"	2026	19	Kick Off the Wall Pt. 1
"Waste It All With You"	2026	18	Kick Off the Wall Pt. 1
"Kick Off The Wall"	2026	21	Kick Off the Wall Pt. 1

== Concert and tours ==
- 2026 KickFlip FAN-CON (From KickFlip,To WeFlip)
- 2027 KickFlip the 1st TOUR <KICK OFF THE WALL>

== Videography ==
=== Music videos ===
Song title	Year	Director(s)	Ref.
"Umm Great"	2025	Ximin OH (Aedastudio)	
"Mama Said"	2025	Junyeop Lee (KEEPUSWEIRD)	
"Knock Knock"	2025	Novv Kim	
"Freeze"	2025	Junyeop Lee (KEEPUSWEIRD)	
"Band-Aid"	2025	Soze	
"My First Love Song"	2025	Jiwon OH (Undermoodfilm)	
"Twenty"	2026	Hobin	
"Eye-Poppin’"	2026	Jiwon OH (Undermoodfilm)	
"Puzzle Piece"	2026	Jan Lee (Aediastudio)	
"Kick Off the Wall" (featuring Iann Dior)	2026	Minha Hwang (Rigend Film)	

== Filmography ==
=== Reality shows ===
Year	Title	Notes	Ref.
2021	Loud	Reality competition show determining KickFlip's members	

== Awards and nominations ==
Name of the award ceremony, year presented, award category, nominee(s) and the result of the award
Award ceremony	Year	Category	Nominee/work	Result	Ref.
Asia Artist Awards	2025	Best New Artist	KickFlip	Won	
D Awards	2025	Discovery of the Year	KickFlip	Won	
D Awards	2025	D Awards Remark	KickFlip	Won	
D Awards	2025	Best Popularity Award – Boy Group	KickFlip	Nominated	
D Awards	2026	Delights Blue Label Award (Bonsang)	KickFlip	Won	
D Awards	2026	Dreams Silver Label Award	KickFlip	Won	
Golden Disc Awards	2026	Rookie Artist of the Year	KickFlip	Nominated	
Korea Grand Music Awards	2025	IS Rising Star	KickFlip	Won	
K-World Dream Awards	2025	Super Rookie Award	KickFlip	Won	
MAMA Awards	2025	Artist of the Year	KickFlip	Nominated	
MAMA Awards	2025	Best New Artist	KickFlip	Nominated	
MAMA Awards	2025	Fans' Choice Male	KickFlip	Nominated	
Seoul Music Awards	2025	Rookie of the Year	KickFlip	Won	
