= Viamão =

Municipality of Rio Grande do Sul, Brazil

- Municipality
- Municipality of Viamão
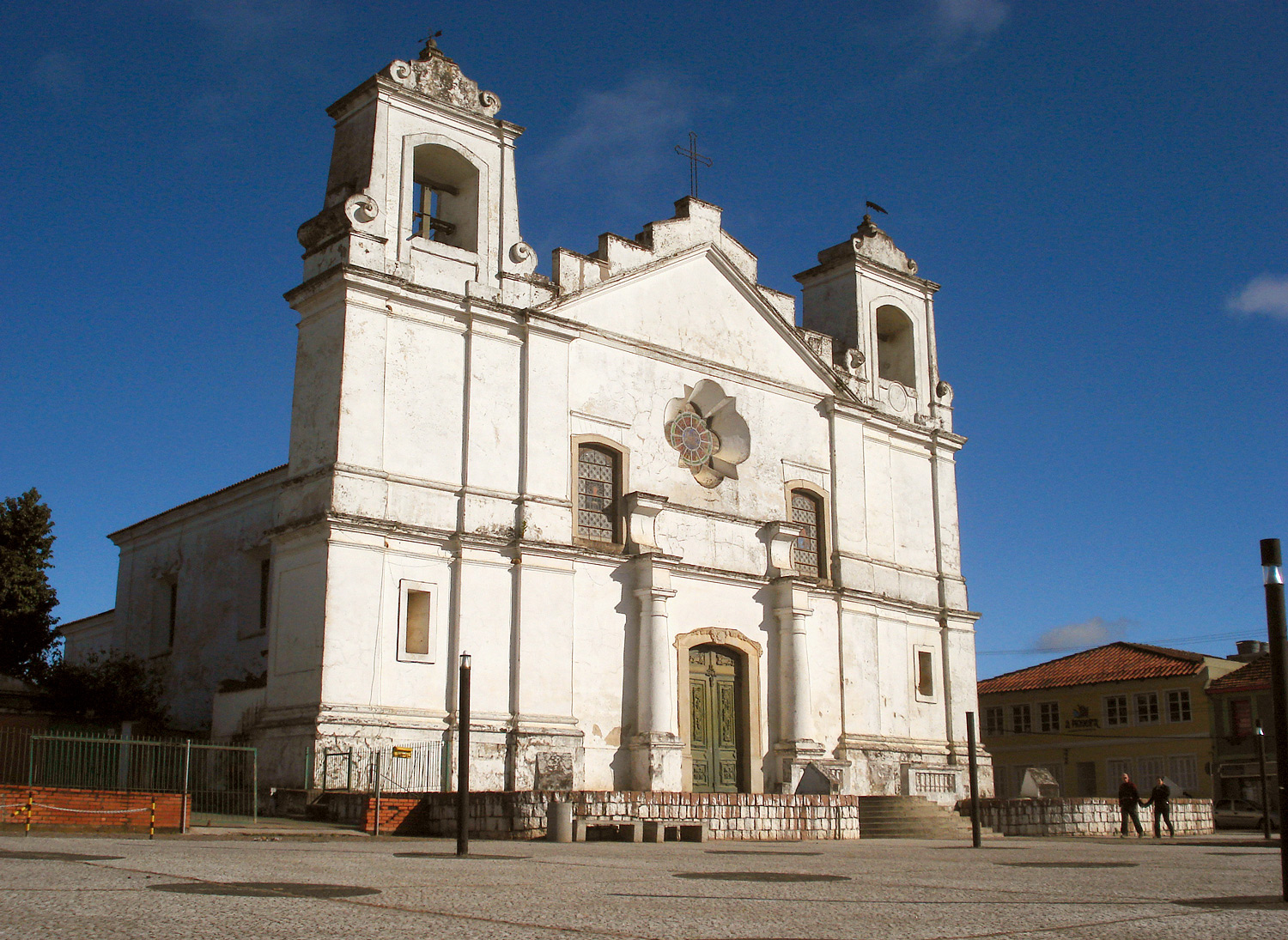
- Parish Church of Nossa Senhora da Conceição

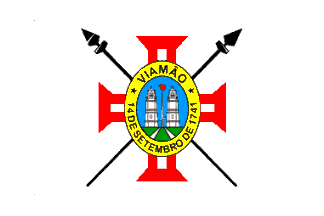
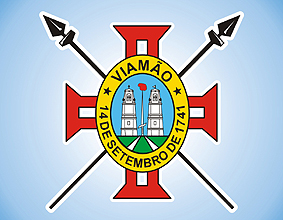
- Flag Coat of arms
- Nickname: First Capital site of Rio Grande do Sul (Primeira Capital do Rio Grande do Sul)
- Location in Rio Grande do Sul

- Location in Brazil
- Coordinates: 30°04′51″S 51°01′22″W
- Country: Brazil
- Region: South
- State: Rio Grande do Sul
- Demonym: viamonense
- Founded: 14 September 1741

Government
  - Mayor: Rafael Bortoletti (PSDB)

Area
  - Total: 1,494.263 km^{2} (576.938 sq mi)
- Elevation: 9 m (30 ft)

Population (2022 Brazilian census)
  - Total: 224,112
  - Estimate (2025): 231,996
  - Density: 149.982/km^{2} (388.451/sq mi)
- Time zone: UTC−3 (BRT)
- HDI (2010): 0.717 – high
- Website: viamao.rs.gov.br

Viamão (Portuguese: [vi.aˈmɐ̃w̃]) is a city in Rio Grande do Sul, Brazil. In size it is the largest municipality in the metropolitan region of Porto Alegre and the seventh most populous in the state.

The origin of the name Viamão is controversial. The more common explanation is that atop the hills of the region it is possible to see the Guaíba River and its five inlets: Jacuí, Caí, Gravataí, Taquari and Rio dos Sinos, which form an open hand. This is said to have lent the city its name -from the phrase "Vi a mão," meaning, "I saw the hand."

== History ==
In the 18th century the region of the modern state Rio Grande do Sul was a trade route between the cities Sorocaba and Colônia do Sacramento. Various colonists created cattle ranches and plantations here. In 1725, Cosme da Silveira, a member of Captain João de Magalhães' fleet, settled in the Viamão region. He was joined by Francisco Carvalho da Cunha in 1741, who created the Estância Grande site, where the church of Nossa Senhora da Conceição (Immaculate Conception) would be built. In 1747, the colony was declared a civil parish. With the Spanish invasion of 1766, it became necessary to install a government center for the captaincy. Viamão served as the seat of the governor until 1773. At that time, the seat was transferred to Porto dos Casais (which later became Porto Alegre). In 1880, Porto Alegre became its own separate municipality.

In 1889, with the advent of the Republic and the dissolution of the Municipal Chambers as an executive power, the city elected its first mayor, Lt.-Col. Tristão José de Fraga, who previously served as the president of the above-mentioned Municipal Chambers. The second mayor would be Col. Felisberto Luiz de Barcellos.

The economic importance of the region, for being the first cattle ranch, grew from the commerce and transport of dried meat (charque) and leather to Laguna and São Paulo. The three commercial routes at the time began where Viamão is located today. The main road, the Estrada Real ("Royal Road"), left the city and passed through Vacaria, Lages, Curitibanos, Papanduva, Rio Negro, Campo do Tenente, Lapa, Palmeira, Ponta Grossa, Castro, Piraí do Sul, Jaguariaiva, Itararé and arriving at Sorocaba. Another route was over the coastal regions until Laguna.

== Recent mayors ==
- By Brazilian Social Democracy Party, André Pacheco (2017 - incumbent);
- By Brazilian Social Democracy Party, Valdir Bonatto (2013 - 2016);
- By Workers' Party, Alex Sander Boscaini (2005 - 2012);
- By Workers' Party, Eliseu Fagundes Chaves "Ridi" (1997-2004);
- By Brazilian Democratic Movement Party, Pedro Antonio de Godoy (1993 - 1996);
- By Democratic Labour Party, Jorge Prates Chiden (1989 - 1992);
- By Democratic Labour Party, Tapir Tabajara Canto da Rocha (1983 - 1988).

== Places of interest ==
The municipality contains the 5,566 hectares (13,750 acres) Itapuã State Park, created in 1991. It also includes the Saint-Hilaire Park, which boasts natural freshwater springs and an abundant wildlife, despite its proximity to a large urban region. The park's integrity, due to an ever-encroaching population in the last few decades, has become progressively threatened. Its name comes from the famous traveler Augustin Saint-Hilaire, who passed through Rio Grande do Sul describing its natural aspects and regional customs. The following sentence is attributed to him: "In this state, there are no residents, there are only survivors." The reason why he said that is the weather, that can be extremely humid, making winters feel colder and summers hotter.

Another site frequently visited is the church of the Immaculate Conception, a National Heritage site, the second oldest church in the state, built between 1766 and 1769 in severe colonial baroque style, but with splendid rococo altars inside.

== Notable people ==
- Xamuel, rapper

== See also ==
- List of municipalities in Rio Grande do Sul
- Passo do Sabão
