= The Boyz discography =

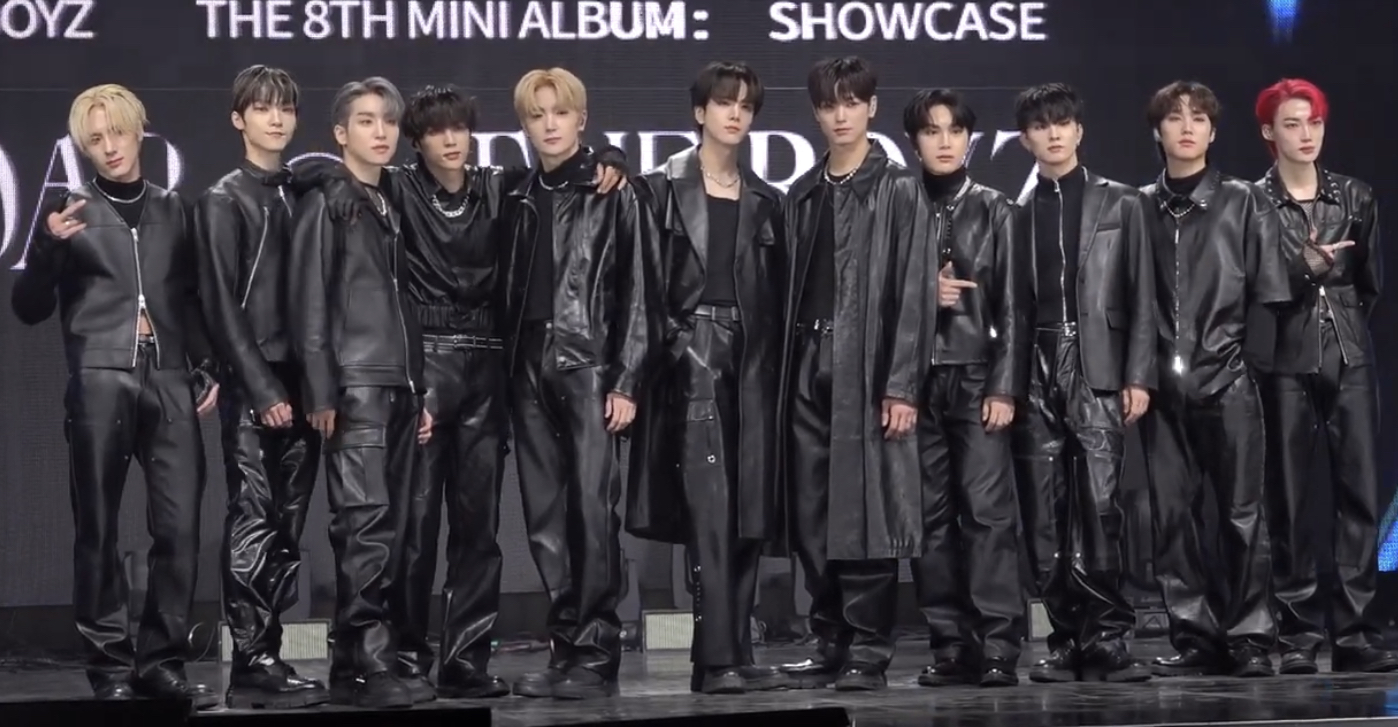
- The Boyz in February 2023
- Studio albums: 6
- EPs: 11
- Singles: 21
- Single albums: 3
- Promotional singles: 2

The discography of the South Korean boy group The Boyz consists of six studio albums, eleven extended plays, three single albums, twenty-one singles, and two promotional singles.

The Boyz was formed by then Cre.ker Entertainment, currently IST Entertainment, consisting eleven members; Sangyeon, Jacob, Younghoon, Hyunjae, Juyeon, Kevin, New, Q, Ju Haknyeon, Sunwoo, and Eric. Originally a twelve-member group, former member Hwall departed from the group in 2019. The group debuted in December 2017 by releasing their debut EP The First. In 2018, the group released two EPs, The Start and The Only, and a single album The Sphere. 2019 saw the release of their single album Bloom Bloom, Korean EP Dreamlike, and Japanese debut EP Tattoo.

In February 2020, the group released their first full studio album Reveal, as well as their fifth Korean EP Chase in September. In March 2021, their first Japanese studio album, Breaking Dawn, was released. Their sixth Korean EP Thrill-ing and their third single album Maverick were also released in August and November 2021, respectively.

2022 saw the release of their second Japanese EP, She's The Boss and their seventh Korean EP, Be Aware. In February 2023, the group released their eighth Korean EP, Be Awake. 2023 also saw the release of the group's both Japanese and Korean sophomore studio albums; their second Japanese studio album, Delicious, was released in June, while their second Korean studio album, Phantasy, is divided into three parts. Pt.1: Christmas in August was released in August, and Pt.2: Sixth Sense was released in November. Pt.3: Love Letter was later released in March of 2024. Trigger, the ninth Korean EP and final album under IST Entertainment, was released in October 2024.

The Boyz third studio album (and first release under new label One Hundred), Unexpected, was released in March of 2025, becoming their best-selling release to date.

To date, The Boyz have earned four number-one albums and two top 10 singles in South Korea.

== Studio albums ==
List of studio albums, with selected details, chart positions, and sales
Title	Details	Peak chart positions					Sales	Certifications
Title	Details	KOR	JPN	JPN Hot	US Sales	US World	Sales	Certifications
Korean
Reveal	Released: February 10, 2020; Label: Cre.ker Entertainment; Formats: CD, digital download, streaming	1	32	—	—	—	KOR: 172,482; JPN: 1,928 (Phy.)	
Phantasy	Pt. 1: Christmas in August; Released: August 7, 2023; Label: IST Entertainment; Formats: CD, digital download, streaming	2	20	—	—	—	KOR: 421,963; JPN: 4,561 (Phy.)	KMCA: Platinum
Phantasy	Pt. 2: Sixth Sense; Released: November 20, 2023; Label: IST Entertainment; Formats: CD, digital download, streaming	1	28	—	—	—	KOR: 515,253; JPN: 2,051 (Phy.)	KMCA: Platinum
Phantasy	Pt. 3: Love Letter; Released: March 18, 2024; Label: IST Entertainment; Formats: CD, digital download, streaming	1	—	—	—	—	KOR: 492,781	KMCA: Platinum
Unexpected	Released: March 17, 2025; Label: One Hundred; Formats: CD, digital download, streaming	1	28	—	13	4	KOR: 749,678; JPN: 1,987 (Phy.)	KMCA: 2× Platinum
Japanese
Breaking Dawn	Released: March 17, 2021; Label: Ariola Japan; Formats: CD, digital download, streaming	—	4	4	—	—	JPN: 20,075 (Phy.)	
Delicious	Released: June 13, 2023; Label: Universal Music IST; Formats: CD, digital download, streaming	—	2	5	—	—	JPN: 50,096 (Phy.)	
Gibberish	Released: July 19, 2024; Label: Universal Music IST; Formats: CD, digital download, streaming	—	6	8	—	—	JPN: 21,713 (Phy.)	

== Soundtrack albums ==
List of soundtrack albums, with selected details, chart positions, and sales
Title	Details	Peak chart positions	Sales
Title	Details	KOR	Sales
"Solo Leveling" Webtoon OST Echo	Released: March 18, 2022 (KOR); Label: D&C Webtoon Biz; Formats: CD, digital download, streaming	10	KOR: 24,716

== Extended plays ==
List of extended plays, with selected details, chart positions, and sales
Title	Details	Peak chart positions					Sales	Certifications (Note: In April 2018, Gaon Music Chart introduced music recording certifications for albums, downloads, and streamings that were released and licensed in Korea starting from January 2018 onward.)
Title	Details	KOR	JPN	JPN Hot	US Sales	US World	Sales	Certifications
Korean
The First	Released: December 6, 2017; Label: Cre.ker Entertainment; Formats: CD, digital download, streaming; Track listing: 1. "Intro"; 2. "Boy" (소년); 3. "Walkin' in Time" (시간이 안 지나가); 4. "Got It" (있어); 5. "I'm Your Boy"; 6. "Boy" (소년) (Inst.)	3	120	—	—	—	KOR: 91,225; JPN: 2,392	N/A
The Start	Released: April 3, 2018; Label: Cre.ker Entertainment; Formats: CD, digital download, streaming; Track listing: 1. "The Start"; 2. "Giddy Up"; 3. "Text Me Back"; 4. "Just U"; 5. "Back 2 U"; 6. "Get It"	2	56	—	—	—	KOR: 100,748; JPN: 2,586	
The Only	Released: November 29, 2018; Label: Cre.ker Entertainment; Formats: CD, digital download, streaming	3	39	—	—	—	KOR: 164,027; JPN: 4,755	
Dreamlike	Released: August 19, 2019; Label: Cre.ker Entertainment; Formats: CD, digital download, streaming	2	18	—	—	—	KOR: 145,317; JPN: 4,401	
Chase	Released: September 21, 2020; Label: Cre.ker Entertainment; Formats: CD, digital download, streaming	2	21	—	—	—	KOR: 429,910; JPN: 2,783	KMCA: Platinum
Thrill-ing	Released: August 9, 2021; Label: Cre.ker Entertainment; Formats: CD, digital download, streaming	1	8	—	—	—	KOR: 652,580; JPN: 5,412 (Phy.)	KMCA: 2× Platinum
Be Aware	Released: August 16, 2022; Label: IST Entertainment; Formats: CD, digital download, streaming	1	21	—	—	—	KOR: 585,419; JPN: 2,236 (Phy.)	KMCA: Platinum
Be Awake	Released: February 20, 2023; Label: IST Entertainment; Formats: CD, digital download, streaming; Track listing: 1. "Awake"; 2. "Roar"; 3. "Blah Blah"; 4. "Savior"; 5. "Horizon" (숨); 6. "Diamond Life"	2	18	—	11	6	KOR: 518,788; JPN: 3,500 (Phy.)	
Trigger	Released: October 28, 2024; Label: IST Entertainment; Formats: CD, digital download, streaming; Track listing: 1. "Bite Back"; 2. "Trigger" (導火線); 3. "Bad"; 4. "Slip Away" (숨바꼭질); 5. "Re-Wind"; 6. "They See Me Dream"	4	36	—	—	—	KOR: 504,601; JPN: 1,495 (Phy.)	KMCA: Platinum
A;Effect	Released: July 28, 2025; Label: One Hundred; Formats: CD, digital download, streaming; Track listing: 1. "Stylish"; 2. "Talk"; 3. "You and I"; 4. "Constellation"; 5. "Aura"	1	—	—	—	—	KOR: 473,602	KMCA: Platinum
Japanese
Tattoo	Released: November 6, 2019; Label: Ariola Japan; Formats: CD, digital download, streaming	—	2	4	—	—	JPN: 19,122	
She's the Boss	Released: May 27, 2022; Label: Universal Music IST; Formats: CD, digital download, streaming; Track listing: 1. "She's the Boss"; 2. "Toxic Love"; 3. "Why Why Why"; 4. "Don't Cry"; 5. "One Dance"; 6. "Always Together"	—	3	4	—	—	JPN: 35,088 (Phy.)	
"—" denotes items that did not chart or were not released in that area.

== Single albums ==
List of single albums, with selected details, chart positions, and sales
Title	Details	Peak chart positions	Sales
Title	Details	KOR	Sales
The Sphere	Released: September 5, 2018; Label: Cre.ker Entertainment; Formats: CD, digital download, streaming; Track listing: 1. "Right Here"; 2. "L.O.U"; 3. "Keeper" (지킬게) (Prod. Park Kyung)	4	KOR: 78,794
Bloom Bloom	Released: April 29, 2019; Label: Cre.ker Entertainment; Formats: CD, digital download, streaming	2	KOR: 163,700
Maverick	Released: November 1, 2021; Label: Cre.ker Entertainment; Formats: CD, digital download, streaming	1	KOR: 650,772

== Singles ==
Title	Year	Peak chart positions				Album
Title	Year	KOR Circle	KOR Hot	HUN	US World	Album
Korean
"Boy" (소년)	2017	—	—	—	—	The First
"Giddy Up"	2018	—	—	—	—	The Start
"Keeper" (지킬게)	2018	—	—	—	—	The Sphere
"Right Here"	2018	—	—	—	—	The Sphere
"No Air"	2018	—	86	—	—	The Only
"Bloom Bloom"	2019	—	74	—	—	Bloom Bloom
"D.D.D"	2019	—	—	—	—	Dreamlike
"White" (화이트)	2019	—	—	—	—	Non-album single
"Reveal"	2020	—	—	—	—	Reveal
"The Stealer"	2020	46	86	—	—	Chase
"Christmassy!"	2020	— (Note: "Christmassy!" did not enter the Gaon Digital Chart, but debuted and peaked at number 34 on Gaon Download Chart.)	—	—	—	Non-album single
"Thrill Ride"	2021	11	81	—	—	Thrill-ing
"Maverick"	2021	6	—	12	13	Maverick
"Candles"	2021	— (Note: "Candles" did not enter the Gaon Digital Chart, but debuted and peaked at number 60 on Gaon Download Chart.)	—	—	—	Non-album single
"Timeless"	2022	— (Note: "Timeless" did not enter the Circle Digital Chart, but debuted and peaked at number 21 on Circle Download Chart.)	—	—	—	Be Aware
"Whisper"	2022	18	—	—	—	Be Aware
"All About You"	2022	— (Note: "All About You" did not enter the Circle Digital Chart, but debuted and peaked at number 65 on Circle Download Chart.)	—	—	—	Non-album single
"Roar"	2023	6	—	—	—	Be Awake
"Lip Gloss"	2023	16	—	—	—	Phantasy Pt. 1: Christmas in August
"Watch It"	2023	14	—	—	—	Phantasy Pt. 2: Sixth Sense
"Nectar"	2024	20	—	—	—	Phantasy Pt. 3: Love Letter
"Trigger" (導火線)	2024	19	—	—	—	Trigger
"Last Kiss"	2024	— (Note: "Last Kiss" did not enter the Circle Digital Chart, but debuted and peaked at number 79 on Circle Download Chart.)	—	—	—	Non-album single
"VVV"	2025	31	—	—	—	Unexpected
"Stylish"	2025	73	—	—	—	A;Effect
"Still Love You"	2025	— (Note: "Still Love You" did not enter the Circle Digital Chart, but peaked at number 101 on Circle Download Chart.)	—	—	—	Non-album single
Japanese
"Tattoo"	2019	—	—	—	—	Tattoo
"Breaking Dawn"	2021	—	—	—	—	Breaking Dawn
"She's the Boss"	2022	—	—	—	—	She's the Boss
"Delicious"	2023	—	—	—	—	Delicious
"Gibberish"	2024	—	—	—	—	Gibberish
"—" denotes items that did not chart or were not released in that area.

== Other releases ==
Title	Year	Peak chart position	Album
Title	Year	KOR	Album
Promotional singles
"Drink It" (Note: "Drink It" was released as a promotional single in collaboration with Universe.)	2021	— (Note: "Drink It" did not enter the Gaon Digital Chart, but debuted and peaked at number 57 on Gaon Download Chart.)	Non-album singles
"Sweet" (Note: "Sweet" was released as a promotional single in collaboration with Universe.)	2022	— (Note: "Sweet" did not enter the Gaon Digital Chart, but debuted and peaked at number 97 on Gaon Download Chart.)	Non-album singles
Soundtrack appearances
"Priority" (우선순위) (Note: Credited as a song by The Boyz, but sung by Hyunjae, New, and Sunwoo.)	2021	— (Note: "Priority" did not enter the Gaon Digital Chart, but debuted and peaked at number 37 on Gaon Download Chart.)	Run On OST Part 7
"Will Be" (지금처럼) (Note: Credited as a song by The Boyz, but sung by Sangyeon, Jacob, Younghoon, Hyunjae, Kevin, New and Q.)	2021	— (Note: "Will Be" did not enter the Gaon Digital Chart, but debuted and peaked at number 121 on Gaon Download Chart.)	Racket Boys OST Part 1
"Summer Night" (여름밤) (Note: Credited as a song by The Boyz, but sung by Jacob, Hyunjae and Q.)	2022	— (Note: "Summer Night" did not enter the Circle Digital Chart, but debuted and peaked at number 189 on Circle Download Chart.)	Summer Strike OST Part 2
"Stealer" (Note: Credited as a song by The Boyz, but sung by Sangyeon, Hyunjae, Ju Haknyeon, Sunwoo and Eric.)	2023	—	Stealer: The Treasure Keeper OST Part 2
"—" denotes items that did not chart or were not released in that area.

== Other charted songs ==
Title	Year	Peak chart positions		Album
Title	Year	KOR Gaon	KOR Hot	Album
"Checkmate"	2020	134	90	Road to Kingdom Final
"Kingdom Come"	2021	37	7	Kingdom Final: Who is the King?
