= IST Entertainment discography =

This is a list of albums released under IST Entertainment.

== 2010 ==
| Release date | Title | Artist | Format | Language |
|---|---|---|---|---|
| November 4 | "Always" | Huh Gak | Digital single, digital download | Korean |
| November 16 | Huh Gak 1st Mini Album | Huh Gak | Extended play, digital download | Korean |

== 2011 ==
| Release date | Title | Artist | Format | Language |
|---|---|---|---|---|
| April 19 | Seven Springs of Apink | Apink | Extended play, digital download | Korean |
| June 23 | "It Girl" | Apink | Digital single, digital download | Korean |
| September 16 | Like 1st Mini Album "First Story" | Huh Gak | Extended play, digital download | Korean |
| November 7 | "I Told You I Wanna Die" | Huh Gak | Digital single, digital download | Korean |
| November 22 | Snow Pink | Apink | Extended play, digital download | Korean |
| December 9 | "Whenever You Play That Song" | Huh Gak (with LE) | Digital single, digital download | Korean |

== 2012 ==
| Release date | Title | Artist | Format | Language |
|---|---|---|---|---|
| February 3 | "Message" | Mario | Digital single, digital download | Korean |
| March 14 | "A Cube For Season #Green" | Jung Eun-ji, Yang Yo-seob | Digital single, digital download | Korean |
| April 3 | Lacrimoso | Huh Gak | Extended play, digital download | Korean |
| April 19 | "April 19th" | Apink | Digital single, digital download | Korean |
| May 9 | Une Annee | Apink | Studio album, digital download | Korean |
| July 6 | "Bubibu" | Apink | Digital single, digital download | Korean |
| August 1 | "Mayday" | Mario | Digital single, digital download | Korean |
| August 21 | "I Need You" | Huh Gak (with Zia) | Digital single, digital download | Korean |
| September 14 | "It Hurts" | Huh Gak | Digital single, digital download | Korean |

== 2013 ==
| Release date | Title | Artist | Format | Language |
|---|---|---|---|---|
| January 3 | "A Cube For Season #White" | Jung Eun-ji, Kim Nam-joo, Jang Hyun-seung | Digital single, digital download | Korean |
| February 5 | Little Giant | Huh Gak | Studio album, digital download | Korean |
| May 31 | "A Cube For Season #Blue" | Huh Gak, Jung Eun-ji | Digital single, digital download | Korean |
| July 5 | Secret Garden | Apink | Extended play, digital download | Korean |
| August 13 | "You Are Mine" (feat. Swings) | Huh Gak | Digital single, digital download | Korean |
| November 11 | Reminisce | Huh Gak | Extended play, digital download | Korean |

== 2014 ==
| Release date | Title | Artist | Format | Language |
|---|---|---|---|---|
| January 13 | "Good Morning Baby" | Apink | Digital single, digital download | Korean |
| February 25 | Another Parting | Melody Day | Single album, digital download | Korean |
| March 31 | Pink Blossom | Apink | Extended play, digital download | Korean |
| June 27 | "My Darling" | Apink BnN | Digital single, digital download | Korean |
| July 8 | "A Cube For Season #Sky Blue" | Huh Gak, Jung Eun-ji | Digital single, digital download | Korean |
| October 7 | "Day N Night" | Huh Gak (feat. Simon Dominic) | Digital single, digital download | Korean |
| October 22 | "NoNoNo" | Apink | CD single, digital download | Japanese |
| November 24 | Pink Luv | Apink | Extended play, digital download | Korean |
| December 12 | "Anxious" | Melody Day (feat. Mad Clown) | Digital single, digital download | Korean |
| December 17 | 2011-2014 Best of Apink (Korean Ver.) | Apink | Compilation album | Korean |

== 2015 ==
| Release date | Title | Artist | Format | Language |
|---|---|---|---|---|
| February 18 | "Mr. Chu (On Stage)" | Apink | CD single, digital download | Japanese |
| March 17 | Snow Of April | Huh Gak | Extended play, Digital download | Korean |
| April 19 | "Promise U" | Apink | Digital single, digital download | Korean |
| May 20 | LUV | Apink | CD single, digital download | Japanese |
| May 22 | "Town Bar" | Huh Gak (with Jung-in) | Digital single, digital download | Korean |
| June 2 | "A Cube For Season #Blue Season 2" | Kim Nam-joo, Yook Sung-jae | Digital single, digital download | Korean |
| June 9 | #LoveMe | Melody Day | Single album, digital download | Korean |
| July 16 | Pink Memory | Apink | Studio album, digital download | Korean |
| August 26 | Pink Season | Apink | Studio album, digital download | Japanese |
| October 7 | Speed Up | Melody Day | Single album, digital download | Korean |
| October 14 | "Up All Night" | Huh Gak | Digital single, digital download | Korean |
| November 23 | Story Of Winter | Huh Gak | Extended play, Digital download | Korean |
| December 9 | "Sunday Monday" | Apink | CD single, digital download | Japanese |
| December 29 | "When It Rains" | Melody Day (feat. Ravi of VIXX) | Digital single, digital download | Korean |

== 2016 ==
| Release date | Title | Artist | Format | Language |
|---|---|---|---|---|
| February 4 | "Already Winter" | Huh Gak (with Vromance) | Digital single, digital download | Korean |
| March 23 | "Brand New Days" | Apink | CD single, digital download | Japanese |
| April 18 | Dream | Jung Eun-ji | Extended play, digital download | Korean |
| April 19 | "The Wave" | Apink | Digital single, digital download | Korean |
| July 1 | Color | Melody Day | Extended play, digital download | Korean |
| July 21 | "Plan A First Episode" | Huh Gak, Jung Eun-ji | Digital single, digital download | Korean |
| August 3 | "Summer Time!" | Apink | CD single, digital download | Japanese |
| September 1 | "Plan A Second Episode" | Huh Gak, Victon | Digital single, digital download | Korean |
| September 26 | Pink Revolution | Apink | Studio album, digital download | Korean |
| November 9 | Voice to New World | Victon | Extended play, digital download | Korean |
| December 15 | Dear | Apink | Studio album, digital download | Korean |
| December 21 | Pink Doll | Apink | Studio album, digital download | Japanese |

== 2017 ==
| Release date | Title | Artist | Format | Language |
|---|---|---|---|---|
| January 25 | "You Seem Busy" | Melody Day (feat. Ilhoon of BtoB) | Digital single, digital download | Korean |
| January 31 | Lover Letter | Huh Gak | Extended play, digital download | Korean |
| February 15 | Kiss on the Lips | Melody Day | Extended play, digital download | Korean |
| February 16 | "Band-Aid" | Huh Gak (with MC Mong) | Digital single, digital download | Korean |
| March 2 | Ready | Victon | Extended play, digital download | Korean |
| March 29 | "Bye Bye" | Apink | CD single, digital download | Japanese |
| April 10 | The Space | Jung Eun-ji | Extended play, digital download | Korean |
| April 19 | "Always" | Apink | Digital single, digital download | Korean |
| June 26 | Pink Up | Apink | Extended play, digital download | Korean |
| July 27 | "Motto Go! Go!" | Apink | CD single, digital download | Japanese |
| August 3 | "Plan A Third Episode" | Apink, Huh Gak, Victon | Digital single, digital download | Korean |
| August 23 | Identity | Victon | Extended play, digital download | Korean |
| September 9 | "Manito" | Jung Eun-ji | Digital single, digital download | Korean |
| November 8 | "Orion" | Apink | CD single, digital download | Japanese |
| November 9 | From. Victon | Victon | Extended play, digital download | Korean |
| November 27 | "Only You" | Huh Gak | Digital single, digital download | Korean |
| December 6 | The First | The Boyz | Extended play, digital download | Korean |
| December 27 | Pink Stories | Apink | Studio album, digital download | Japanese |

== 2018 ==
| Release date | Title | Artist | Format | Language |
|---|---|---|---|---|
| February 6 | "The Last Night" | Huh Gak | Digital single, digital download | Korean |
| April 3 | The Start | The Boyz | Extended play, digital download | Korean |
| April 18 | Apink Singles Collection | Apink | Compilation album | Japanese |
| April 19 | Miracle | Apink | Single album, digital download | Korean |
| May 23 | Time of Sorrow | Victon | Single album, digital download | Korean |
| June 29 | "Restless" | Melody Day | Digital single, digital download | Korean |
| July 2 | One & Six | Apink | Extended play, digital download | Korean |
| September 5 | The Sphere | The Boyz | Single album, digital download | Korean |
| October 17 | Hyehwa | Jung Eun-ji | Extended play, digital download | Korean |
| November 28 | "Empty Words" | Huh Gak | Digital single, digital download | Korean |
| November 29 | The Only | The Boyz | Extended play, digital download | Korean |

== 2019 ==
| Release date | Title | Artist | Format | Language |
|---|---|---|---|---|
| January 7 | Percent | Apink | Extended play, digital download | Korean |
| April 19 | "Everybody Ready?" | Apink | Digital single, digital download | Korean |
| April 29 | Bloom Bloom | The Boyz | Single album, digital download | Korean |
| May 12 | Mini | Lim Ji-min | Single album, digital download | Korean |
| August 19 | Dreamlike | The Boyz | Extended play, digital download | Korean |
| August 21 | Oh! | Oh Ha-young | Extended play, digital download | Korean |
| October 31 | "Let You Go" | Huh Gak, Jung Eun-ji | Digital single, digital download | Korean |
| November 4 | Nostagia | Victon | Extended play, digital download | Korean |
| November 6 | Tattoo | The Boyz | Extended play, digital download | Japanese |
| December 6 | "White" | The Boyz | Digital single, digital download | Korean |
| December 11 | Youth | Lim Ji-min | Single album, digital download | Korean |

== 2020 ==
| Release date | Title | Artist | Format | Language |
|---|---|---|---|---|
| February 10 | Reveal | The Boyz | Studio album, digital download | Korean |
| February 13 | "I'm Still Loving You" | Kang Seung-sik | Digital single, digital download | Korean |
| March 9 | Continuous | Victon | Extended play, digital download | Korean |
| April 3 | "Square One" | Bandage | Digital single, digital download | Korean |
| April 13 | Look | Apink | Extended play, digital download | Korean |
| June 2 | Mayday | Victon | Single album, digital download | Korean |
| June 19 | 432 | Bandage | Studio album, digital download | Korean |
| June 30 | We Are | Weeekly | Extended play, digital download | Korean |
| July 15 | Simple | Jung Eun-ji | Extended play, digital download | Korean |
| August 10 | Fame | Han Seung-woo | Extended play, digital download | Korean |
| August 27 | "Without You" | Huh Gak | Digital single, digital download | Korean |
| September 7 | Bird | Kim Nam-joo | Single album, digital download | Korean |
| September 21 | Chase | The Boyz | Extended play, digital download | Korean |
| October 13 | We Can | Weeekly | Extended play, digital download | Korean |
| December 7 | "Christmassy!" | The Boyz | Digital single, digital download | Korean |
| December 28 | Hello | Huh Gak | Studio album, digital download | Korean |

== 2021 ==
| Release date | Title | Artist | Format | Language |
|---|---|---|---|---|
| January 11 | Voice: The Future Is Now | Victon | Studio album, digital download | Korean |
| March 17 | Breaking Dawn | The Boyz | Studio album, digital download | Japanese |
| March 17 | We Play | Weeekly | Extended play, digital download | Korean |
| April 19 | "Thank You" | Apink | Digital single, digital download | Korean |
| June 28 | Fade | Han Seung-woo | Extended play, digital download | Korean |
| July 11 | "Drink It" | The Boyz | Digital single, digital download | Korean |
| August 4 | Play Game: Holiday | Weeekly | Extended play, digital download | Korean |
| August 9 | Thrill-ing | The Boyz | Extended play, digital download | Korean |
| September 25 | Blaze | Do Han-se | Extended play, digital download | Korean |
| October 7 | "Youth21" | Bandage | Digital single, digital download | Korean |
| November 1 | Maverick | The Boyz | Single album, digital download | Korean |
| November 9 | "Sweet Travel" | Victon | Digital single, digital download | Korean |
| December 6 | "Candles" | The Boyz | Digital single, digital download | Korean |

== 2022 ==
| Release date | Title | Artist | Format | Language |
|---|---|---|---|---|
| January 18 | Chronograph | Victon | Single album, digital download | Korean |
| February 14 | Horn | Apink | Studio album, digital download | Korean |
| March 7 | Play Game: Awake | Weeekly | Single album, digital download | Korean |
| April 19 | "I Want You To Be Happy" | Apink | Digital single, digital download | Korean |
| May 27 | She's The Boss | The Boyz | Extended play, digital download | Japanese |
| May 31 | Chaos | Victon | Extended play, digital download | Korean |
| June 17 | "Sweet" | The Boyz | Digital single, digital download | Korean |
| June 29 | "Remember" | Bandage | Digital single, digital download | Korean |
| July 12 | Copycat | Apink Chobom | Single album, digital download | Korean |
| July 27 | The Beginning : 開花 | ATBO | Extended play, digital download | Korean |
| August 16 | Be Aware | The Boyz | Extended play, digital download | Korean |
| October 26 | The Beginning : 始作 | ATBO | Extended play, digital download | Korean |
| November 15 | Choice | Victon | Extended play, digital download | Korean |

== 2023 ==
| Release date | Title | Artist | Format | Language |
|---|---|---|---|---|
| February 20 | Be Awake | The Boyz | Extended play, digital download | Korean |
| April 5 | SELF | Apink | Extended play, digital download | Korean |
| May 18 | The Beginning : 飛上 | ATBO | Extended play, digital download | Korean |
| June 13 | Delicious | The Boyz | Studio album, digital download | Japanese |
| August 7 | Phantasy Pt. 1: Christmas in August | The Boyz | Studio album, digital download | Korean |
| September 12 | "Good Day (Special Daileee)" | Weeekly | Digital single, digital download | Korean |
| November 1 | ColoRise | Weeekly | Extended play, digital download | Korean |
| November 20 | Phantasy Pt. 2: The Sixth Sense | The Boyz | Studio album, digital download | Korean |
| November 27 | Must Have | ATBO | Single album, digital download | Korean |
| December 11 | Pink Christmas | Apink | X-mas season song, digital download | Korean |
