= List of songs with lyrics by Jo Yoon-kyung =

Jo Yoon-kyung is a South Korean lyricist and writer. Since 2002, when she made her debut with BoA's "Listen to My Heart", she has written extensively for many artists, particularly those under SM Entertainment, such as BoA, Girls' Generation, F(x), Shinee, Exo, NCT, Red Velvet, and Aespa. She has also worked with non-SM artists like SF9, Iz*One, GFriend, Verivery, Astro, The Boyz, and Kiss of Life. Her "representative songs" include Shinee's "Sherlock", Taeyeon's "U R", and Red Velvet's "Rookie". As of September 7, 2025, Jo has 409 credits listed with the Korea Music Copyright Association.

== 0–9 ==
Song title, original artist(s), album of release, and year of release
Song	Artist(s)	Other writer(s)	Album	Year	Ref.
"0 Mile"	NCT 127	Taeyong, Mark, Cho Jin-joo, Choi So-young, Park Yong-joon	Cherry Bomb	2017	
"1+1"	Pentagon	Wooseok	Love or Take	2021	
"10 Months"	Enhypen	Park Young-woong, Wu-hyun Park, Kim Su-bin, Lee Hee-joo, Yiyijin, Jun Hee-jae, Sung Ji-yoon, "Hitman" Bang, Kim Soo-jeong, Andrew Bullimore, Josh Record, Peter Rycroft, Tom Mann	Border: Day One	2020	
"2 Kids"	Taemin	Taemin	Never Gonna Dance Again: Act 1	2020	
"28 Reasons"	Seulgi	Jeon Ji-eun, January 8, Yoo Young-jin	28 Reasons	2022	
"3.6.5"	Exo	—	XOXO	2013	

== A ==
Song title, original artist(s), album of release, and year of release
Song	Artist(s)	Other writer(s)	Album	Year	Ref.
"Advice"	Taemin	—	Advice	2021	
"After Midnight"	BoA	—	Forgive Me	2022	
"Aim High"	R U Next?	Suyeong, Ele, Lee Seu-ran, Darly, Shinkung, Ciara Muscat	R U Next?	2023	
"Airplane"	Iz*One	Jang Yeo-jin, Lee Dae-hwi	Heart*Iz	2019	
"All Night"	Astro	Jinjin, Rocky	All Light	2019	
"Always Find You"	Yuri X Raiden	Raiden, Afshin Salmani, Josh Cumbee	Non-album single	2018	
"Analogue Radio"	Super Junior	—	The Road: Winter for Spring	2022	
"Angel"	Exo (Note: Sung by Baekhyun, D.O., and Suho; credited as Exo)	—	Mama	2012	
"Aphrodite"	Wheein	—	In the Mood	2023	
"Artistic Groove"	Taemin	—	Want	2019	
"Assemble"	Mave:	—	What's My Name	2023	
"Awake"	The Boyz	Znee, Deez, Saay, Jacob, Kevin, Sunwoo	Be Awake	2023	

== B ==
Song title, original artist(s), album of release, and year of release
Song	Artist(s)	Other writer(s)	Album	Year	Ref.
"Baby Don't Cry"	Exo	—	XOXO	2013	
"Back Hug"	Girls' Generation	—	Mr.Mr.	2014	
"Back in Vogue"	AleXa	—	Girls Gone Vogue	2022	
"Back to Zerobase"	Zerobaseone	Danke (Lalala Studio), Seo Ji-eum, Seulli (MUMW), Yiyijin	Youth in the Shade	2023	
"Bad"	Kim Nam-joo	Yiyijin, Bang Hye-hyun	Bad	2024	
"Bad Dracula"	Red Velvet	—	Russian Roulette	2016	
"Bad Girls R Us"	Itzy	—	Gold	2024	
"Bad Luck"	The Boyz	—	Phantasy Pt. 2: Sixth Sense	2023	
"Bamsopoong"	Illit	Lee Seu-ran, January 8, Vincenzo, Moon Ji-young (Lalala Studio), Kim Su-ji (Lalala Studio), Dyvahh, Lauren Aquilina, Iselin Solheim, Askjell Solstrand	Bomb	2025	
"Baram X 3"	Taeyeon	—	Something New	2018	
"Be Honest"	Loona	—	(&)	2021	
"Beautiful Goodbye"	f(x)	—	Pinocchio	2011	
"Beg for Me"	Red Velvet	—	The ReVe Festival 2022 – Feel My Rhythm	2022	
"Better Than Ever" (나아졌어)	Choi In-young	Joo Seung-hoon, Jo Seong-min, Lee Jong-soo, Na Byung-su	Sweden Laundry OST Part.2	2014	
"Bird of Night"	Tomorrow X Together (Note: Solo song by Taehyun, credited to Tomorrow X Together)	Slow Rabbit, Lee Seu-ran, Jeon Ji-eun, Park Woo-hyun, Kim In-hyeong (Jam Factory), Danke, Yiyijin, Ellie Suh (153/Joombas), Taehyun, Choi Bo-ra (153/Joombas), True (153/Joombas), Woo Seung-yeon (153/Joombas), Na Jung-ah (153/Joombas), Benjamin Samama, Sara Davis, Davin Kingston, Michael Gerow	The Star Chapter: Together	2025	
"Bite Back"	The Boyz	Wutan, MZMC, Cha Yu-bin (Very Goods), Jiwon (153/Joombas), Bay (153/Joombas), May Choi (153/Joombas), Jonathan Hoskins	Trigger	2024	
"Bittersweet"	Wonwoo, Mingyu (featuring Lee Hi)	Bumzu, Wonwoo, Mingyu	Non-album single	2021	
"Black Suit"	Super Junior	Lee Seu-ran, Oh Min-joo, Im Jung-hyo, ESBEE	Play	2017	
"Blah Blah"	The Boyz	Sunwoo, Eric	Be Awake	2023	
"Blue"	Ha Sung-woon	—	Bxxx	2019	
"Blue Wave"	NCT Dream	—	ISTJ	2023	
"Bonnie and Clyde"	Victon	Do Han-se	Chaos	2022	
"Boom Pow"	TO1	—	Why Not??	2022	
"Boomerang"	Exo	—	The War: The Power of Music	2017	
"Boomerang"	Loossemble	—	One of a Kind	2024	
"Brave"	Twice	Lee Seu-ran, Slow Rabbit, No Ju-hwan	Between 1&2	2022	
"Broken"	TVXQ	—	New Chapter No. 1: The Chance of Love	2018	
"Bump & Love"	The Boyz	Sunwoo, Hyunjae, New	Be Aware	2022	
"Bump It"	Girls' Generation	—	Lion Heart	2015	
"Burn the Floor"	Super Junior	—	The Renaissance	2021	
"Butterflies"	Red Velvet	—	RBB	2018	
"Butterfly"	BoA	—	Starry Night	2019	
"Butterfly"	Henry (featuring Seulgi)	—	Fantastic	2014	

== C ==
Song title, original artist(s), album of release, and year of release
Song	Artist(s)	Other writer(s)	Album	Year	Ref.
"C'est La Vie"	Cravity	—	Evershine	2024	
"California Hotel"	Rosanna	—	Non-album single	2022	
"Call Back"	Minho	—	Call Back	2024	
"Call Me Baby"	Exo	January 8, Kim Dong-hyun	Exodus	2015	
"Calling Out For You"	Kangta	Ryan S. Jhun, Steven Andre Battey, Sebastian Thott, Carlos Battey, Jason Nicholas Dmuchowski	'Home' Chapter 1	2016	
"Came and Left Me"	Minho	—	Call Back	2024	
"Camo"	BoA	—	One Shot, Two Shot	2017	
"Campfire"	Red Velvet	—	The Red	2015	
"Carat Cake"	NCT Dream	—	Dream()scape	2024	
"Chapter 2"	Yuri	—	The First Scene	2018	
"Check It Out"	Weeekly	—	Play Game: Holiday	2021	
"Checkmate"	The Boyz	Sunwoo	Road to Kingdom Final	2020	
"Chemistry"	Shinee	Minho	The Story of Light	2018	
"Chemistry"	Kiss of Life	—	Lose Yourself	2024	
"Cherry Blossom"	Cravity	—	Evershine	2024	
"Chewing Gum"	NCT Dream	Moon Seol-ri, Jung Min-ji, Mark	The First	2016	
"Chococo"	Gugudan	Kim Do-hoon, Seo Yong-bae	Act. 3 Chococo Factory	2017	
"Christmas Without You"	Taeyeon	—	This Christmas: Winter Is Coming	2017	
"Chu"	f(x)	—	Hot Summer	2009	
"Chup Chup"	Moonbin & Sanha	—	Incense	2023	
"Circus"	Taeyeon	—	Something New	2018	
"Cloud Nine"	Cherry Bullet	—	Cherry Dash	2023	
"Clue"	Shinee	—	Sherlock	2012	
"Copycat"	Apink Chobom	—	Copycat	2022	
"Cosmic"	Bada, Ryeowook	—	SM Station Season 1	2016	
"Crush"	Zerobaseone	Melange (Inhouse), Song-yu (Inhouse), Jeong Min-ji (Inhouse), Sunflower, Danke, Kass	Melting Point	2023	
"Curtain Call"	Verivery	—	Face Me	2020	

== D ==
Song title, original artist(s), album of release, and year of release
Song	Artist(s)	Other writer(s)	Album	Year	Ref.
"D.D.D"	The Boyz	Sunwoo	Dreamlike	2019	
"Dad"	D.O.	—	Empathy	2021	
"Dance with You"	Tomorrow X Together (Note: Solo song by HueningKai, credited to Tomorrow X Together)	Kim In-hyeong (Jam Factory), Danke, Kim Bo-eun (Jam Factory), Yiyijin, Ellie Suh (153/Joombas), Choi Bo-ra (153/Joombas), Na Jung-ah (153/Joombas), Kella Armitage, Ori Rose, Tommy Driscoll, Alex Nobile	The Star Chapter: Together	2025	
"Danger"	Tomorrow X Together	Slow Rabbit, Lee Seu-ran, Danke, Hwang Yu-bin (Very Goods), Kim Bo-eun (Jam Factory), Jung Hari (153/Joombas), Beomgyu, Yeonjun, Taehyun, True (153/Joombas), Woo Seung-yeon (153/Joombas), Na Jung-ah (153/Joombas), Sean Maxwell Douglas, Feli Ferraro, Jbach, Johnny Goldstein	The Star Chapter: Sanctuary	2024	
"Dangerous"	Shinee	Jonghyun	Why So Serious? – The Misconceptions of Me	2013	
"Dawns"	ARrC	Hyunmin, Choi Han	Hope	2025	
"Day After Day"	Exo	—	Obsession	2019	
"Daydream"	The Boyz	—	Dreamlike	2019	
"Daylight"	Ha Sung-woon	—	Strange World	2022	
"Deep"	Hyoyeon	—	Deep	2022	
"Deja Vu"	f(x)	—	4 Walls	2015	
"Delight"	Key	—	Gasoline	2022	
"Desperate"	R U Next?	Ele, Lee Seu-ran, January 8, Ca$hcow, Yiyijin, Jade.J, Shinkung, Sofia Quinn	R U Next?	2023	
"Diamond"	Exo	—	The War	2017	
"Don't Let Me Go"	Shinee	Minho, Key	1 of 1	2016	
"Dot Dot Dot"	AtHeart	—	Plot Twist	2025	
"Dracula"	f(x)	—	Red Light	2014	
"Drawing Our Moments"	Taeyeon	—	Purpose	2019	
"Dreamer"	Tomorrow X Together	Ghstloop, Koda, Chris Collins, Jack Newsome, "Hitman" Bang, James Keys, Jung Jin-woo, Song Jae-kyung, Big Hit Music, Yiyijin, Danke, Jeon Ji-eun, Lee Seu-ran, Yeonjun, Stella Jang, Soobin, Beomgyu, Slow Rabbit, Hueningkai	The Name Chapter: Freefall	2023	
"Drip"	Hinapia	Andreas Carlsson, Albin Halvar Olaus Nordqvist, Maria Marcus	New Start	2019	
"Drip"	SuperM	—	Super One	2020	
"Drive"	NCT Dream	—	Glitch Mode	2022	
"Drunk in the Morning"	Ryeowook	Ryeowook, Jeon Song-i	Drunk on Love	2019	
"Dry Flower"	BoA	BoA	Starry Night	2019	

== E ==
Song title, original artist(s), album of release, and year of release
Song	Artist(s)	Other writer(s)	Album	Year	Ref.
"Eau de Spring"	Rosanna	—	Non-album single	2022	
"Eenie Meenie"	Chungha (featuring Hongjoong of Ateez)	Chungha, Kim Hong-joong	Non-album single	2024	
"Electricity"	KickFlip	—	Kick Out, Flip Now!	2025	
"Escape"	The Boyz	—	Phantasy Pt. 2: Sixth Sense	2023	
"Evanesce II"	Super Junior-D&E	Jang Yeo-jin (Lalala Studio)	'Bout You	2018	
"Everybody"	Shinee	—	Everybody	2013	
"Excel"	8Turn	—	Uncharted Drift	2023	
"Exodus"	Exo	—	Exodus	2015	
"Extra"	Jeon Somi	Hwang Yu-bin (Very Goods), Jeon Somi, Vince, Teddy, Shae Jacobs, Alna Hofmeyr, Joshua Allen Mojica Hui	Non-album single	2025	
"Extra-Ordinary"	Billlie	—	The Billage of Perception: Chapter Three	2023	
"Eyes"	Iz*One	Andy Love, Andreas Öberg, David Amber, Ryan S. Jhun	Bloom*Iz	2020	
"Eyes on You"	Kangta	—	Eyes on You	2022	

== F ==
Song title, original artist(s), album of release, and year of release
Song	Artist(s)	Other writer(s)	Album	Year	Ref.
"Fairy Tale"	The Boyz	Eric	Phantasy Pt. 1: Christmas in August	2023	
"Falling"	Jin	Lee Seu-ran, Jin, Hwang Yu-bin (Very Goods), Ellie Suh (153/Joombas), Ghstloop, Pdogg, Megumi Wada, Taka, Toru	Happy	2024	
"Fifty-Fifty"	BAE173	J-Min, Doha	New Chapter: Luceat	2024	
"Fire Eyes"	The Boyz	—	Phantasy Pt. 1: Christmas in August	2023	
"First Dream"	Weki Meki	—	I Am Me.	2021	
"Flame On"	I-Land	Park Young-woong, Lee Seu-ran, Park Woo-hyun, Hwang Yoo-bin, Kim Soo-bin, Lee Hee-joo, Kim Yo-bi, Yiyijin, Mok Ji-min (Lalala Studio), Min Yeon-jae, Chris Golightly, Denzil Remedios	I-Land	2020	
"Flashover"	Enhypen	Armadillo, Ranga, Bae Seong-hyeon (MUMW), Oh Hyun-sun (Lalala Studio), Shizu, Akil King, Tyler Spry, Kareen Lomax, Joel Corry	Desire: Unleash	2025	
"Flicker"	Enhypen, I-Land	Seo Young-jun, Lee Seu-ran, "Hitman" Bang, Matt Thompson, Max Lynedoch Graham, Ryan Lawrie, James Francis Reynolds	Border: Day One, I-Land	2020	
"Focus"	Onew	Onew	Flow	2024	
"Forever Yours"	Key (featuring Soyou)	—	Face	2018	
"Frost"	Tomorrow X Together	Ashton Casey, Gina Kushka, Jacob Manson, Yeonjun, "Hitman" Bang, Kim Bo-eun, Danke, Hwang In-chan	The Chaos Chapter: Freeze	2021	

== G ==
Song title, original artist(s), album of release, and year of release
Song	Artist(s)	Other writer(s)	Album	Year	Ref.
"G.B.T.B."	Verivery	Cho Su-jin, Kim Hye-jung	Face Us	2020	
"Galaxy"	Luna	—	Free Somebody	2016	
"Galaxy Dust"	Ha Sung-woon	—	Select Shop	2021	
"Gemini"	Seventeen (Solo song by Jun)	Hwang Yu-bin (Very Goods), Jun	Happy Burstday	2025	
"Gentleman"	Kiss of Life	—	Born to Be XX	2023	
"Get It"	Pristin V	—	Like a V	2018	
"Ghost Girl"	Tomorrow X Together (Note: Solo song by Yeonjun, credited to Tomorrow X Together)	Lee Seu-ran, Danke, Kim Bo-eun (Jam Factory), Ellie Suh (153/Joombas), Yeonjun, Maiz, 4Season, Woo Seung-yeon (153/Joombas), Na Jung-ah (153/Joombas), Jake Torrey, Yungblud, Paul Meany	The Star Chapter: Together	2025	
"Girls Are Back"	Girls' Generation	Lim Jung-hyo	Holiday Night	2017	
"Good Boy Gone Bad"	Tomorrow X Together	Slow Rabbit, Supreme Boi, Cazzi Opeia, Ellen Berg, Big Hit Music, Melanie Joy Fontana, Michel "Lindgren" Schulz, "Hitman" Bang, Yeonjun, Blvsh, Chris James	Minisode 2: Thursday's Child	2022	
"Good Day for a Good Day"	Super Junior	Park Sung-hee, Eunhyuk	Play	2017	
"Good Evening"	Shinee	Minho, Key	The Story of Light	2018	
"Good Good"	Key	—	Face	2018	
"Good Night"	Zerobaseone	Yiyijin, Sunflower	Melting Point	2023	
"Good Night My Princess"	Chungha	Chungha	Bare & Rare	2022	
"Got That Boom"	Secret Number	Jinny Park	Got That Boom	2020	
"Graffiti"	ATBO	Jung Hari (153/Joombas)	The Beginning: 開花	2022	
"Grey Suit"	Suho	SH2O	Grey Suit	2022	

== H ==
Song title, original artist(s), album of release, and year of release
Song	Artist(s)	Other writer(s)	Album	Year	Ref.
"Heads Up"	Super Junior	—	Time Slip	2019	
"Heart on the Window"	Jin with Wendy	Lee Seu-ran, Ellie Suh (153/Joombas), Alex Karlsson, Pdogg, Linda Quero, Jack Antonoff	Happy	2024	
"Heaven"	Taeyeon	Lee Oh-neul, Moon Ji-young (Lalala Studio), Leslie	Non-album single	2024	
"Heaven"	Tomorrow X Together	Slow Rabbit, Lee Seu-ran, Danke, Jung Jin-woo, Yiyijin, Ellie Suh (153/Joombas), Yeonjun, Taehyun, Soobin, 4Season (153/Joombas), Sean Maxwell Douglas, Jbach, Johnny Goldstein	The Star Chapter: Sanctuary	2024	
"Heavenly"	NCT Dream	—	Dreamscape	2024	
"Helicopter"	CLC	Breadbeat, Jang Ye-eun	Non-album single	2020	
"Helium"	Enhypen	Lee Seu-ran, Armadillo, January 8, Hwang Yu-bin (Very Goods), Peridot, Kim Su-ji (Lalala Studio), Bay (153/Joombas), Na Jung-ah (153/Joombas), Jay, May Choi (153/Joombas), Charis (MUMW), Shizu, "Hitman" Bang, Frants, Jesse Thomas, Edwin Honoret, Jeremiah Daly	Desire: Unleash	2025	
"Hello"	Seohyun (featuring Eric Nam)	Seohyun	Don't Say No	2017	
"Here I Am"	Boys Planet	Wwwave (Papermaker), Wi Han-ah (Papermaker), Jin-ri (Full8loom), Boys Planet	Non-album single	2023	
"Here I Am"	Taeyeon	—	Purpose	2019	
"Hey Mama!"	Exo-CBX	—	Hey Mama!	2016	
"Hey You"	Year 7 Class 1	Ju Seung-hun, Cho Seong-min, Lee Jong-su, Na Byung-su	Sweden Laundry OST Part.3	2014	
"Higher than Heaven"	Tomorrow X Together	Danke, Hwang Yu-bin (Very Goods), Yiyijin, Taehyun, Maiz, 4Season (153/Joombas), Na Do-yeon (153/Joombas), Woo Seung-yeon (153/Joombas), Na Jung-ah (153/Joombas), Rachel West, Evan Gartner, Sam Preston	The Star Chapter: Sanctuary	2024	
"Historia"	Cravity	—	Road to Kingdom: Ace of Ace	2024	
"Hold Me Tight"	Verivery	—	Face Us	2020	
"Holiday"	Henry	—	Trap	2013	
"Honey & Diamonds"	BoA	—	Better	2020	
"Honey or Spice"	Lightsum	—	Honey or Spice	2023	
"Horizon"	The Boyz	Q, Sunwoo, Eric	Be Awake	2023	
"Hot Air Balloon"	Aespa	—	Drama	2023	
"Hot Sauce"	NCT Dream	Moon Yeo-reum	Hot Sauce	2021	
"Hush Rush"	Chaeyeon	—	Hush Rush	2022	
"Hwasa"	Hwasa	Psy	O	2024	

== I ==
Song title, original artist(s), album of release, and year of release
Song	Artist(s)	Other writer(s)	Album	Year	Ref.
"I Feel Pretty"	Irene	Lisa Scinta, Jonah Christian, Angelina Barrett, Kim Si-won, Eli Brown	2024 B-day Party – Irene [Irene in Wonderland] (Note: Unreleased song performed at the event.)	2024	
"I Know"	Key	—	Pleasure Shop	2024	
"I Need U"	TNX	Nam Hye-ju, Eun Hwi, Psy, Young, Mpaulify	Love Never Dies	2023	
"I Pray"	Sungmin	Sungmin	Orgel	2019	
"I Think I"	Super Junior	January 8, Eunhyuk	Time Slip	2019	
"I Wanna"	Ha Sung-woon	—	Blessed	2024	
"Ice Cream"	Tomorrow X Together	Jacob Attwooll, Tristan Landymore, Frederick Cox, Conrad Sewell, Danke, "Hitman" Bang, Lee Seu-ran, Stella Jang, Soobin	The Chaos Chapter: Freeze	2021	
"Ice Cream Cake"	Red Velvet	Kim Dong-hyun	Ice Cream Cake	2015	
"Iced Coffee"	Red Velvet	—	Chill Kill	2023	
"Iconic"	Aespa	—	Savage	2021	
"Identity"	Taemin	—	Never Gonna Dance Again: Act 2	2020	
"I'll Be There"	Jin	Jin, Ghstloop, Evan, Pdogg, Max, Martin Masarov	Happy	2024	
"Impurities"	Le Sserafim	Score (13), Megatone (13), Jonna Hall, Danke (Lalala Studio), "Hitman" Bang, Huh Yunjin, Daniel "Obi" Klein, Charli Taft, Kim Chae-ah, Maggie Szabo, Hayes Kramer, Blvsh, Jaro, Nikolay Mohr, Park Sang-yu, Lee Hyung Seok (PNP)	Antifragile	2022	
"In Bloom"	Zerobaseone	Seo Young-jun, Danke (Lalala Studio), Yiyijin, Seo Ji-eum, Rum (MUMW), Jeon Hye-kyung (MUMW)	Youth in the Shade	2023	
"In the Mood"	Wheein	Hong Sujie (153/Joombas), Chang Seung-min (Lalala Studio), Kim Chae-ryn (153/Joombas), Park Ji-yun (153/Joombas), Choi Bo-ra (153/Joombas), Park Min-young (153/Joombas)	In the Mood	2023	
"Infinite City"	JO1	Odal Park, Zaydro, Kushitamine, Starbuck, June	Wandering (Special Edition)	2021	
"Infinite City (Groundbreak Version)"	TO1	Odal Park, Zaydro, Starbuck, June	1st Track of CJ LiveCity	2021	
"Islands"	Super Junior	Seo Ji-eum, Lee Yoo-jin	Mamacita	2014	
"It's Love"	D.O.	—	Empathy	2021	

== J ==
Song title, original artist(s), album of release, and year of release
Song	Artist(s)	Other writer(s)	Album	Year	Ref.
"Jagiyah"	TRAX	Mark Stein	Oh! My Goddess	2010	
"January 0th (A Hope Song)"	Billlie	—	The Billlie's Odditorium' The Second Edition	2024	
"Joy"	NCT Dream	Mark, Isaac Watts	SM Station Season 2	2017	
"Juice"	Mirae	—	Marvelous	2022	

== K ==
Song title, original artist(s), album of release, and year of release
Song	Artist(s)	Other writer(s)	Album	Year	Ref.
"Killa"	Mirae	Choi Bo-ra (153/Joombas)	Killa	2021	
"Killing Me"	Chungha	Chungha	Non-album single	2021	
"Kingdom Come"	The Boyz	Hautboi Rich, Albi Albertsson, Yuka Otsuki, Fabian Strangl	Kingdom Final: Who is the King?	2021	
"Knock Knock"	KickFlip	—	Flip It, Kick It!	2025	
"Knock Knock (Who's There?)"	Red Velvet	—	Chill Kill	2023	
"Know Now"	NCT U	Mark	Universe	2021	

== L ==
Song title, original artist(s), album of release, and year of release
Song	Artist(s)	Other writer(s)	Album	Year	Ref.
"La La Pop!"	Ha Sung-woon	—	Non-album single	2022	
"Labyrinth"	GFriend	"Hitman" Bang, Noh Joo-hwan, Adora, Sophia Pae	Labyrinth	2020	
"Lady Luck"	Exo	—	Exodus	2015	
"Last Kiss"	The Boyz	Eric, Zaya (153/Joombas), Ellie Suh (153/Joombas), 4Season (153/Joombas)	Last Kiss	2024	
"Lay Back"	Verivery	Wkly	Face Me	2020	
"Let's Sing"	Ha Sung-woon	True (153/Joombas), Really6 (153/Joombas)	Select Shop	2021	
"Levitating"	The Boyz	Sunwoo	Be Aware	2022	
"Liar"	SF9	—	RPM	2019	
"Library"	Girls' Generation-TTS	—	Twinkle	2012	
"Lighthouse"	Tempest	Lee Eui-woong, Hwarang, Choi Jae-hyuk	Voyage	2024	
"Lights On"	Weeekly	—	Bliss	2024	
"Little Monster"	Illit	January 8, Danke, Vincenzo, Kim Bo-eun (Jam Factory), Yiyijin, Mia (153/Joombas), Ellie Suh (153/Joombas), Dana, 3!, Bay (153/Joombas), Maryjane (Lalala Studio), Vendors, Lee Kyung, So Do-yeon, Yoonchae, "Hitman" Bang, Dyvahh, Caroline Ailin, Jesse Shatkin	Bomb	2025	
"Live Without You"	Key	—	Good & Great	2023	
"Lock You Down"	Shinee	Brian Kim	The Story of Light	2018	
"Loco"	3YE	Zhangguyy, Mo	Non-album single	2023	
"Lotto"	Exo	JQ, Seolim, Kim Min-ji	Lotto	2016	
"Love 119"	Riize	Jeong Da-seul, Chamane, Moon Seol-ri	Riizing	2024	
"Love Bomb"	Fromis 9	—	From.9	2018	
"Love Bubble"	Iz*One	Kim Min-ju, Sakura Miyawaki	Vampire	2019	
"Love Fire"	Cravity	Allen, Serim	Sun Seeker	2023	
"Love Me Out Loud"	Chungha	Chungha	Bare & Rare	2022	
"Love Language"	Tomorrow X Together	Slow Rabbit, January 8, Hwang Yu-bin (Very Goods), Danke, Kim Bo-eun (Jam Factory), Yiyijin, Ellie Suh (153/Joombas), HueningKai, Woo Seung-yeon (153/Joombas), Na Jung-ah (153/Joombas), Linda Quero, The Elements	Non-album single	2025	
"Love on Lock"	Kep1er	—	Magic Hour	2023	
"Love Right Back"	Raiden (featuring Taeil and Lil Boi)	Lil Boi, Raiden, Benjamin Samama, Robert Adam Allouche	Love Right Back	2021	
"Love Shhh!"	Jo Yu-ri	Danke (Lalala Studio)	Op.22 Y-Waltz: in Major	2022	
"Love Shot"	Exo	Chen, Chanyeol	Love Shot	2018	
"Love Song"	Kangta (featuring Paloalto)	Paloalto, Anoop Desai, Emanuel Abrahamsson	Eyes on You	2022	
"Love Therapy"	Shownu X Hyungwon	—	The Unseen	2023	
"Love Yourself"	Eric Nam	Jung Da-eun, Choi Jin-suk, Noday	It's Okay To Be Sensitive 2 OST Part 1	2019	
"Lower"	Amber and Luna	Le'mon, Mzmc, Nicky van der Lugt Melsert, Sanne Huisman	SM Station Season 2	2018	
"Lucid Dream"	The Boyz	—	The Only	2018	
"Lucifer"	Enhypen	Chanti, Charlotte Wilson, danke, Franke Day, Hybe, Jade.J, January 8, Jeon Ji-eun, Kim Ju-hyung	Memorabilia	2024	

== M ==
Song title, original artist(s), album of release, and year of release
Song	Artist(s)	Other writer(s)	Album	Year	Ref.
"Magic"	Super Junior	—	Magic	2015	
"Magic Carpet Ride"	NCT 127	—	Sticker	2021	
"Mago"	GFriend	Eunha, Yuju, Umji, "Hitman" Bang, Frants, Jaded Jane, Ellen Berg, Noisy Citizen, Justin Reinstein, Paulina Cerrilla, Cazzi Opeia, Kyler Niko, JJean, Alice Vicious	Walpurgis Night	2020	
"Make Me Love You"	Taeyeon	—	My Voice (Note: Deluxe edition)	2017	
"Maverick"	The Boyz	Danke, Kyler Niko, Ronnie Icon	Maverick	2021	
"Mayday! Mayday!"	BoA	Tommy Lee James, Alexander Geringas, Her0ism	Only One	2012	
"Maze"	Toheart	—	1st Mini Album	2014	
"Me & U"	Super Junior	Lee Woo-jin, Song Min-joo, Eunhyuk	Replay	2018	
"ME.N.U"	Ha Dong-kyun and Junny	—	Non-album single	2021	
"Medusa"	Just B	—	÷ (Nanugi)	2023	
"Melody"	Girls' Generation-Oh!GG	—	2021 Winter SM Town: SMCU Express	2021	
"Melting Point"	Zerobaseone	Yiyijin, 12h51m, Sunflower	Melting Point	2023	
"Midas Touch"	Kiss of Life	Strbnc, Mia, Ondine, Samson	Midas Touch	2024	
"Midnight Kiss"	Ive	Liz	Ive Secret	2025	
"Milkshake"	Mave:	—	What's My Name	2023	
"Mirror"	Itzy	—	Crazy in Love	2021	
"Mirror Mirror"	Kim Nam-joo (Note: Narrated by Daniel Henney)	—	Bad	2024	
"Miss Me"	NCT Dream	Ryan Williamson, Jay Will, Kella Armitage	Go Back to the Future	2025	
"Mixed Up"	Enhypen	Shin Kung, Wonderkid, Denzil "DR" Remedios, January 8, Lee Seu-ran, Kang Eun-jung, Wyatt Sanders, Yiyijin, Cazzi Opeia, Alexander Karlsson	Border: Carnival	2021	
"Moment"	Seo Gi	—	Moment	2024	
"Mood Lamp"	Girls' Generation	—	Forever 1	2022	
"Moonwalk"	Astro	Jinjin, Rocky	All Light	2019	
"Movie"	Yook Sung-jae	—	All About Blue	2025	
"Mr.Mr."	Girls' Generation	Kim Hee-jeong	Mr.Mr.	2014	
"My Everything"	Henry	Seo Jung-hwan, AB&Co., Neil Nallas	Trap	2013	
"My Face"	Verivery	—	Face Us	2020	
"My Show"	Cha Ji-yeon and LDN Noise	Lauren Dyson, Adrian McKinnon, Greg Bonnick, Hayden Chapman	Non-album single	2016	
"My Tears"	TRAX	—	Hyena OST	2006	
"Mystery"	Hyoyeon	Lee Seu-ran, Jay Q, David Amber, Devyn Rush	SM Station Season 1	2016	
"Mystery Lover"	Taemin	—	Press It	2016	

== N ==
Song title, original artist(s), album of release, and year of release
Song	Artist(s)	Other writer(s)	Album	Year	Ref.
"Nectar"	The Boyz	Eric, Alphabet (153/Joombas)	Phantasy Pt. 3: Love Letter	2024	
"New Kidz on the Block"	Zerobaseone	—	Youth in the Shade	2023	
"Next to Me"	ATBO	Bae Hyun-jun, Oh Jun-seok	The Beginning: 飛上	2023	
"Night Away"	Taemin	—	Guilty	2023	
"Nightmares"	The Boyz	—	Thrill-ing	2021	
"No Doubt"	Enhypen	Armadillo, Danke, Ranga, Bae Seong-hyeon (MUMW), Yiyijin, Peridot, Kim Su-ji (Lalala Studio), Bay (153/Joombas), Colin (MUMW), "Hitman" Bang, Johnny Goldstein, Theron Thomas, Kasey Phillips	Romance: Untold -Daydream-	2024	
"No Rules"	Tomorrow X Together	Gavin Jones, Olof Lindskog, Ryan Lawrie, Lee Seu-ran, Yeonjun, Danke, Hueningkai, Beomgyu, "Hitman" Bang, January 8	The Chaos Chapter: Freeze	2021	
"Nobody Knows"	Kiss of Life	Choi Sang-hyuk, Julie	Born to Be XX	2023	
"Non Stop"	Exo	—	Obsession	2019	
"Not Alone"	NCT 127	—	Neo Zone	2020	
"Note"	Shinee	—	Sherlock	2012	

== O ==
Song title, original artist(s), album of release, and year of release
Song	Artist(s)	Other writer(s)	Album	Year	Ref.
"O' My!"	Iz*One	Hidden Sound (HSND), Han Kang (HSND), Shin Jae-young (HSND)	Color*Iz	2018	
"Oasis"	Exo	—	Don't Mess Up My Tempo	2018	
"Odd Sense"	VIXX	Ravi	Eau de VIXX	2018	
"Once Again"	NCT 127	—	NCT #127	2016	
"One Day"	Taeyeon	—	Something New	2018	
"One Kiss"	Riize	—	Riizing	2024	
"OoWee"	Nowadays	Siyun, Jinhyuk	Nowadays	2024	

== P ==
Song title, original artist(s), album of release, and year of release
Song	Artist(s)	Other writer(s)	Album	Year	Ref.
"Paranoia"	Cravity	Allen, Serim	Dare to Crave	2025	
"Party"	Girls' Generation	—	Lion Heart	2015	
"Party Pop"	Viviz	—	Summer Vibe	2022	
"Perfect 10"	Red Velvet	—	Perfect Velvet	2017	
"Permeate"	Yerin	—	Rewrite	2024	
"Picture Frame"	Key	Bang Hye-hyun	Hunter	2025	
"Pleasure Shop"	Key	Key, Lee Hyung-suk, Park Tae-won	Pleasure Shop	2024	
"Plot Twist"	AtHeart	Bang Hye-hyun	Plot Twist	2025	
"Popcorn"	Lightsum	—	Light a Wish	2021	
"POW! (Play On the World)"	Cherry Bullet	—	Cherry Dash	2023	
"Pride"	R U Next?	"Hitman" Bang, Lisa Desmond, Maria Marcus, Tobias, Naeslund	R U Next?	2023	
"Prom Night"	Fromis 9	Baek Ji-heon	Unlock My World	2023	
"Punk Right Now"	Hyoyeon with 3lau	Le'mon	Deep	2018	

== Q ==
Song title, original artist(s), album of release, and year of release
Song	Artist(s)	Other writer(s)	Album	Year	Ref.
"Q&A"	Hyuna	GroovyRoom, Kwaca, Bang Hye-hyun, Na Jeong-ah	Attitude	2024	
"Queendom"	Red Velvet	—	Queendom	2021	

== R ==
Song title, original artist(s), album of release, and year of release
Song	Artist(s)	Other writer(s)	Album	Year	Ref.
"Rainbow"	NCT Dream	Mark, Jeno, Jaemin, Jisung	Hot Sauce	2021	
"Reason"	Kai	—	Kai	2020	
"Red Dress"	Red Velvet	—	The Red	2015	
"Resist (Not Gonna Run Away)"	Tomorrow X Together	Slow Rabbit, Lee Seu-ran, January 8, Danke, Kim In-hyeong (Jam Factory), Beomgyu, Taehyun, Soobin, True (153/Joombas), HueningKai, Woo Seung-yeon (153/Joombas), Na Jung-ah (153/Joombas), "Hitman" Bang, Carson Thatcher, Ewan Mainwood	The Star Chapter: Sanctuary	2024	
"Retro"	Shinee	—	The Story of Light	2018	
"Ribbon"	BamBam	BamBam, Lee Ha-jin, Earattack, Luke	Ribbon	2021	
"Rise & Shine"	Kyuhyun and Tiffany	—	To the Beautiful You	2012	
"Rocket"	NCT Dream	—	Hot Sauce	2021	
"Romeo"	BoA	Young-hu Kim	2003 Summer Vacation in SMTown.com	2003	
"Rookie"	Red Velvet	—	Rookie	2017	
"Royalty"	Enhypen	Danke, Lee Hyung-suk, Ellie Suh (153/Joombas), Cha Yu-bin (Very Goods), "Hitman" Bang, Benjmn, Vaughn Oliver, Pearl Lion	Romance: Untold	2024	
"Ruby-Duby-Du"	Weeekly	—	ColoRise	2023	
"Russian Roulette"	Red Velvet	—	Russian Roulette	2016	
"Russian Roulette"	The Boyz	—	Maverick	2021	

== S ==
Song title, original artist(s), album of release, and year of release
Song	Artist(s)	Other writer(s)	Album	Year	Ref.
"Sacrifice (Eat Me Up)"	Enhypen	"Hitman" Bang, Alexander Karlsson, Andy Love, Deeno (Snnny), Hero (Snnny), Josh McClelland, Matt Thomson, Max Lynedoch Graham, Ryan Lawrie, Wonderkid, Yejune Synn (Snnny), Kim Jae-won (Jam Factory), Jeon Ji-eun	Dark Blood	2023	
"Salty"	The Boyz	—	Reveal	2020	
"Secret"	Yuri and Seohyun	Greg Bonnick, Hayden Chapman, Carolyn Jordan, Caroline Gustavsson	SM Station Season 1	2016	
"Sensitive"	Naevis	Danke, Kim In-hyeong (Jam Factory), Ryu Da-som (Jam Factory), Choi Ji-ae (Jam Factory), Yeom Wun-seon (Jam Factory), Sophia Brenan, Mathias Wang, John Christopher Donnachie, Joey Eighty	Non-album single	2025	
"Set the Tone"	Aespa	—	Armageddon	2024	
"Seven Sins"	Drippin	Corbin	Non-album single	2023	
"Shadow"	Twice	—	More & More	2020	
"Shadow"	ARrC	Black Nine	Ar^c	2024	
"Sherlock (Clue + Note)"	Shinee	—	Sherlock	2012	
"Shhh"	Wheein	Go Eun-byul	Shhh... (Note: Unreleased song performed during her tour Whee In The Mood [Beyond])	2024	
"Show Time"	Super Junior	Jay Jay, Park Woo-jeong, Park Ji-hyo, Ronnie Icon, Adile, Werdy	Non-album single	2024	
"Simply Beautiful"	Super Junior	—	Devil	2015	
"Smile"	TVXQ	—	Rise as God	2015	
"Sneakers"	Ha Sung-woon	—	Sneakers	2021	
"Snowy Stars"	Ha Sung-woon	Lee Jai-ni, Ha Sung-woon, Woo Seung-yeon	Non-album single	2023	
"So What"	Loona	—	(Hash)	2020	
"So Yeah, Love!"	Gyubin	—	Flowering	2025	
"Soul"	Girls' Generation	—	Mr.Mr.	2014	
"Spin Up!"	Super Junior	Heechul, Eunhyuk	Play	2017	
"Starry Night"	Soyou (featuring Mirani)	Mirani	Summer Recipe	2023	
"Starry Night"	Suho	SH2O	Self-Portrait	2020	
"Stay for a Night"	Minho	Kang Eun-yu, Mola, Thama, Minho	Non-album single	2024	
"Step"	f(x)	—	Pink Tape	2013	
"Stranger"	Weeekly	—	Non-album single	2024	
"Strawberry Gum"	Ha Sung-woon	Don Mills, Really6	Select Shop	2021	
"Strawberry Sunday"	NCT DoJaeJung	—	Perfume	2023	
"Stunner"	Ten	Lee Seu-ran, Park Tae-won, Mola, Jop Pangemanan, Jacob Werner, Elias Edman, Dara Ekimova	Stunner	2025	
"Sugarcoat"	Kiss of Life (Note: Solo song by Natty, credited to Kiss of Life)	—	Kiss of Life	2023	
"Sunday Driver"	Tomorrow X Together (Note: Solo song by Soobin, credited to Tomorrow X Together)	Slow Rabbit, Lee Seu-ran, Jeon Ji-eun, January 8, Park Woo-hyun, Kim In-hyeong (Jam Factory), Danke, Yiyijin, Maiz, Choi Bo-ra (153/Joombas), 4Season (153/Joombas), Woo Seung-yeon (153/Joombas), Na Jung-ah (153/Joombas), Kim Tan, William Segerdahl, Grant Yarber, Henrik Heaven, Joe Harvey, Jack Harvey, Daniel Davila, Nicky Youre, Jason Strong	The Star Chapter: Together	2025	
"Sweet Dream"	Weeekly	—	ColoRise	2023	
"Sweet Dreams"	Weki Meki	Audi Mok, Tysha Tiar	New Rules	2020	
"Sweet Misery"	Shinee	—	Hard	2023	
"Swipe"	Itzy	—	Crazy in Love	2021	

== T ==
Song title, original artist(s), album of release, and year of release
Song	Artist(s)	Other writer(s)	Album	Year	Ref.
"Tag Tag Tag"	Verivery	Wkly, Kim Hye-jung	Veri-Chill	2019	
"Take My Half"	Tomorrow X Together (Note: Solo song by Beomgyu, credited to Tomorrow X Together)	Slow Rabbit, January 8, Kim In-hyeong (Jam Factory), Hwang Yu-bin (Very Goods), Danke, Kim Bo-eun (Jam Factory), Yiyijin, Ellie Suh (153/Joombas), Beomgyu, Woo Seung-yeon (153/Joombas), Na Jung-ah (153/Joombas), Pxpillon, Iain James, Adam Argyle	The Star Chapter: Together	2025	
"Talk Talk"	Girls' Generation	—	Lion Heart	2015	
"Tarot Cards"	GFriend	Jung Ho-hyun (e.one), Kim Yeon-seo, Sophia Pae, Val Del Prete, Son Ko-eun (MonoTree), Yuju, Eunha, Umji	Song of the Sirens	2020	
"Tasty"	NCT 127	—	2 Baddies	2022	
"Teeth"	Enhypen	danke, Frants, Hybe, Jade.J, January 8, Jay Noah, Jeon Ji-eun, Shinkung, Tim Tan, Yiyijin	Memorabilia	2024	
"TFW (That Feeling When)"	Enhypen	Wonderkid, DJ Kayvon, Softserveboy, Alex Keem, Danke, Perc%nt, Jo Mi-yang, Shin Kung, January 8	Manifesto: Day 1	2022	
"That's Okay"	D.O.	D.O., Hwang Yu-bin (XYXX)	SM Station Season 3	2019	
"The Beat Goes On"	Super Junior-D&E	—	The Beat Goes On	2015	
"The Feeling"	Shinee	—	Hard	2023	
"The Killa (I Belong to You)"	Tomorrow X Together (Note: Sung by Yeonjun and Soobin, credited to Tomorrow X Together)	Tomislav Ratisec (Dystinkt), Yuval Haim Chain (UV), Ebby, Ari PenSmith, "Hitman" Bang, Na Jung-ah (Joombas/153), January 8, Kim Bo-eun, Hwang Yu-bin, Taehyun, Yeonjun, Kim In-hyung, 4 Seasons (Joombas/153), Danke, Song Jae-kyung	Minisode 3: Tomorrow	2024	
"The Lights of Seoul"	BoA	—	Atlantis Princess	2003	
"The Original"	Mimi	Mimi	The Second World: Final	2022	
"The Planet"	BTS	RM, Lee Hae-in, Pdogg, Melanie Fontana, Michel "Lindgren" Schulz, Krysta Youngs, Gabriel Brandes, Julia Allyn Ross, Matt Thomson, Max Lynedoch Graham, Hilda Stenmalm, Bård Mathias Bonsaksen	Bastions OST	2023	
"The Way We Are"	Jay B	Def., Sabon, Cha Yu-bin	Be Yourself	2022	
"They Never Know"	Exo	—	Ex'Act	2016	
"This Is Love"	Super Junior	Heechul, Kim Ji-won	Mamacita	2014	
"Thrill Ride"	The Boyz	Sunwoo, Eric	Thrill-ing	2021	
"Thunder"	Verivery	—	Face You	2020	
"Thursday's Child Has Far to Go"	Tomorrow X Together (Note: Sung by Soobin, Beomgyu, and Taehyun; credited to Tomorrow X Together)	Slow Rabbit, Beomgyu, Revin, Gabriel Brandes, Matt Thomson, Max Lynedoch Graham, Taehyun, "Hitman" Bang, Song Jae-kyung, January 8, Cazzi Opeia, Ninos Hanna, Melanie Fontana, Michel "Lindgren" Schulz, Alexander Karlsson, Nermin Harambašić, Danke, Hwang Yu-bin	Minisode 2: Thursday's Child	2022	
"Tic Tac"	8Turn	—	8Turnrise	2023	
"Time Chaser"	Victon	Do Han-se	Choice	2022	
"Time to Go!"	ATBO	Jung Hari (153/Joombas), Bae Hyun-jun, Oh Jun-seok	The Beginning: 始作	2022	
"Timeless"	Taeyeon	—	INVU	2022	
"Ting-a-ring-a-ring"	Cherry Bullet	—	Cherry Rush	2021	
"Tinnitus (Wanna Be a Rock)"	Tomorrow X Together	Ebby, Dystinkt Beats, Smash David, David Cabral, Taehyun, Jeon Ji-eun, Yeonjun, Lee Seu-ran, Stella Jang, Danke, January 8	The Name Chapter: Temptation	2023	
"Tip Tip Toes"	Yoojung	Yoojung	Sunflower	2022	
"TKO"	Ive	—	Ive Empathy	2025	
"To Me, Today"	Jin	Hwang Yu-bin (Very Goods), Danke, Jeanjinn Jane, Sokodomo, Ellie Suh (153/Joombas), Ghstloop, Chalee (153/Joombas), Pdogg, Ninos Hanna, William Segerdahl	Echo	2025	
"Tonight"	Shinee	Minos	The Story of Light	2018	
"Too Little Too Late"	Ha Sung-woon with Jamie	—	Strange World	2022	
"Touch"	NCT 127	Kim Min-ji, Shin Jin-hye	NCT 2018 Empathy	2018	
"Touch It"	Exo	Chen	The War	2017	
"Trauma"	Exo	—	Love Shot	2018	
"Trick"	Girls' Generation	—	The Boys	2011	
"Trigger"	Verivery	Seo Eun-jung (Lalala Studio), Harold Philippon	Series 'O' Round 2: Hole	2021	
"Twenty"	KickFlip	—	My First Kick	2026	

== U ==
Song title, original artist(s), album of release, and year of release
Song	Artist(s)	Other writer(s)	Album	Year	Ref.
"Underdog"	Verivery	Kang Eun-jeong, Dr. Jo, Choi Ri, Yiyijin (153/Joombas), Danke	Series 'O' Round 2: Hole	2021	
"Underwater"	Kwon Eun-bi	—	Lethality	2022	
"Universe"	Loona	—	(12:00)	2020	
"U R"	Taeyeon	—	I	2015	

== V ==
Song title, original artist(s), album of release, and year of release
Song	Artist(s)	Other writer(s)	Album	Year	Ref.
"Vanilla"	Lightsum	—	Non-album single	2021	
"Ven Para"	Weeekly	—	Play Game: Awake	2022	
"Vermilion"	Wendy	—	Wish You Hell	2024	
"Volcano"	NCT U	—	NCT 2020 Resonance Pt. 1	2020	

== W ==
Song title, original artist(s), album of release, and year of release
Song	Artist(s)	Other writer(s)	Album	Year	Ref.
"Watch It"	The Boyz	Zaya (153/Joombas), True (153/Joombas), Park Eun-bin (Jam Factory), Song Chae-ri (153/Joombas), Lee Aing-du (153/Joombas), Kim Soo-ah (Jam Factory), Kang Hye-ju (153/Joombas), Kim Sang-eun (Jam Factory), Kim Hyun-ji (Jam Factory), Lee Hye-yoom (Jam Factory)	Phantasy Pt. 2: Sixth Sense	2023	
"We Are Future"	Mirae	Park Soo-bin (Jam Factory), Znee (153/Joombas)	Killa	2021	
"What If I Had Been That Puma"	Tomorrow X Together	Ebenezer, Magnus, Yeonjun, Danke, "Hitman" Bang, Taehyun, Beomgyu, January 8, Lutra, Kim In-hyung	The Chaos Chapter: Freeze	2021	
"What's Your Problem?"	Red Velvet – Irene & Seulgi (featuring Julie of Kiss of Life)	Na Jeong-ah (153/Joombas), Shin Sa-gang (XYXX)	Tilt	2025	
"When I'm Alone"	f(x)	—	4 Walls	2015	
"Whiplash"	The Boyz	—	Chase	2020	
"Whisper"	The Boyz	Sunwoo, Jacob	Be Aware	2022	
"W.House"	Kiss of Life	Na Do-yeon (153/Joombas), Kang Se-bi (153/Joombas)	Kiss Road	2025	
"Why"	Taeyeon	—	Why	2016	
"Wildfire"	Taeyeon	—	What Do I Call You	2020	
"Wildflower"	Viviz	—	A Montage of ( )	2025	
"Wine"	Taeyeon	—	Purpose	2019	
"Winter Sleep"	The Boyz	Cha1	Last Kiss	2024	
"Wishlist"	Tomorrow X Together	Kim Bo-eun, Cazzi Opeia, Slow Rabbit, Ellen Berg, Lee Hee-joo, Hueningkai, Melanie Fontana, Michel "Lindgren" Schulz, Yoon Min-young, Sam Klempner, Lee Seu-ran, "Hitman" Bang, Taehyun, Park Woo-hyun, Yeonjun	Minisode1: Blue Hour	2020	
"Wonder"	Jay B	Def.	Seasonal Hiatus	2023	
"Wow Thing"	Seulgi, SinB, Chungha, and Soyeon	Soyeon	SM Station X 0	2018	

== X ==
Song title, original artist(s), album of release, and year of release
Song	Artist(s)	Other writer(s)	Album	Year	Ref.
"XO (Only If You Say Yes)"	Enhypen	Armadillo, Danke, "Hitman" Bang, Zachary Lawson, Jvke	Romance: Untold	2024	

== Y ==
Song title, original artist(s), album of release, and year of release
Song	Artist(s)	Other writer(s)	Album	Year	Ref.
"Yellow Tape"	Key	—	Bad Love	2021	
"You"	NCT Dream	—	Dreamscape	2024	
"You Think"	Girls' Generation	—	Lion Heart	2015	
"Young & Free"	Xiumin and Mark	Mark	SM Station Season 2	2017	
"Your Echo"	Yesung	—	Here I Am	2016	
