= List of awards and nominations received by The Boyz =

The Boyz awards and nominations
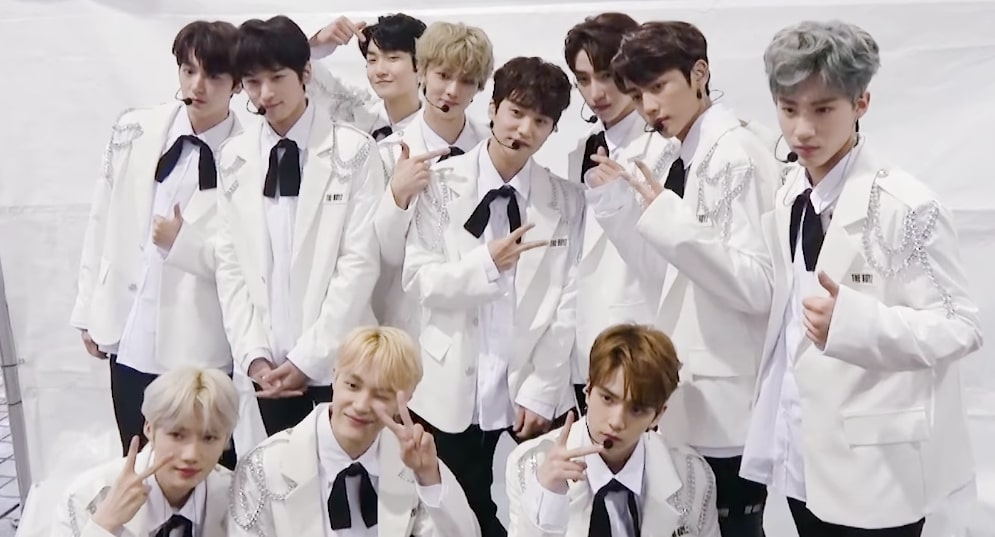
- The Boyz in 2018
Awards and nominations
Award	Wins	Nominations
APAN Music Awards	1	1
Asia Artist Awards	6	9
Brand Customer Loyalty Awards	0	1
Brand of the Year Awards	1	1
The Fact Music Awards	5	5
Gaon Chart Music Awards	2	3
Genie Music Awards	1	4
Golden Disc Awards	2	10
Japan Gold Disc Awards	1	1
K-Global Heart Dream Awards	3	3
Korea Culture and Entertainment Awards	1	1
Korea Popular Music Awards	1	1
MAMA Awards	0	3
Melon Music Awards	4	4
MTV Video Music Awards Japan	1	1
Seoul Music Awards	2	24
Soribada Best K-Music Awards	3	3
V Live Awards	1	2

Totals (Note: Certain award groups do not simply award one winner. They acknowledge several different recipients, have runners-up, and have third place. Since this is a specific recognition and is different from losing an award, runner-up mentions are considered wins in this award tally. For simplification and to avoid errors, each award in this list has been presumed to have had a prior nomination.)
- Wins: 35
- Nominations: 77

This is a list of awards and nominations received by The Boyz, a South Korean boy group formed by Cre.ker Entertainment. Their debut extended play The First, second extended play The Start and third extended play The Only, released in December 2017, April 2018 and November 2018, respectively, won the group several new artist awards between 2018 and 2019, including the 2nd Soribada Best K-Music Awards, the 3rd Asia Artist Awards and the 9th Gaon Chart Music Awards.

== Awards and nominations ==
Name of the award ceremony, year presented, category, nominee of the award, and the result of the nomination
Award ceremony	Year	Category	Nominee / Work	Result	Ref.
APAN Music Awards	2020	APAN Top 10 Bonsang	The Boyz	Won	
Asia Artist Awards	2018	Popularity Award	The Boyz	Nominated	
Asia Artist Awards	2018	Male Rookie of the Year Award	The Boyz	Won	
Asia Artist Awards	2020	Male Singer Popularity Award	The Boyz	Nominated	
Asia Artist Awards	2020	AAA Best Choice (Singer)	The Boyz	Won	
Asia Artist Awards	2021	Asia Celebrity Award - Music	The Boyz	Won	
Asia Artist Awards	2021	Best Musician Award	The Boyz	Won	
Asia Artist Awards	2021	Male Idol Group Popularity Award	The Boyz	Nominated	
Asia Artist Awards	2022	Best Artist Award - Music	The Boyz	Won	
Asia Artist Awards	2023	Best Artist Award - Music	The Boyz	Won	
Brand Customer Loyalty Awards	2021	Hot Trend Male Idol Group	The Boyz	Nominated	
Brand of the Year Awards	2018	Male Rookie Idol of the Year	The Boyz	Won	
The Fact Music Awards	2018	Next Leader Award	The Boyz	Won	
The Fact Music Awards	2019	Best Performer Award	The Boyz	Won	
The Fact Music Awards	2020	Global Hottest Award	The Boyz	Won	
The Fact Music Awards	2021	Artist of the Year (Bonsang)	The Boyz	Won	
The Fact Music Awards	2022	Artist of the Year (Bonsang)	The Boyz	Won	
Gaon Chart Music Awards	2018	New Artist of the Year (Album)	The First	Nominated	
Gaon Chart Music Awards	2019	World Rookie Award	The Boyz	Won	
Gaon Chart Music Awards	2022	Hot Performance of the Year	The Boyz	Won	
Genie Music Awards	2018	Artist of the Year	The Boyz	Nominated	
Genie Music Awards	2018	Male Rookie Award	The Boyz	Nominated	
Genie Music Awards	2018	Genie Music Popularity Award	The Boyz	Nominated	
Genie Music Awards	2022	Best Male Performance Award	The Boyz	Won	
Golden Disc Awards	2019	Best New Artist	The Boyz	Nominated	
Golden Disc Awards	2019	NetEase Most Popular K-pop Star	The Boyz	Nominated	
Golden Disc Awards	2020	Best Album	The Only	Nominated	
Golden Disc Awards	2020	Most Popular Artist	The Boyz	Nominated	
Golden Disc Awards	2021	Next Generation Award	The Boyz	Won	
Golden Disc Awards	2022	Best Performance	The Boyz	Won	
Golden Disc Awards	2022	Album Bonsang	Thrill-ing	Nominated	
Golden Disc Awards	2022	Seezn Most Popular Artist Award	The Boyz	Nominated	
Golden Disc Awards	2023	Album Bonsang	Be Aware	Nominated	
Golden Disc Awards	2023	TikTok Most Popular Artist Award	The Boyz	Nominated	
Japan Gold Disc Award	2020	Best 3 New Artist (Asia)	The Boyz	Won	
K-Global Heart Dream Awards	2022	K Global Best Performance Award	The Boyz	Won	
K-Global Heart Dream Awards	2023	K Global Bonsang (Main Prize)	The Boyz	Won	
K-Global Heart Dream Awards	2023	K Global Best Music Video Award	The Boyz	Won	
Korea Culture and Entertainment Awards	2019	K-pop Singer Award	The Boyz	Won	
Korea Popular Music Awards	2018	Rookie of the Year	The Boyz	Won	
MAMA Awards	2018	Best New Male Artist	The Boyz	Nominated	
MAMA Awards	2018	Artist of the Year	The Boyz	Nominated	
MAMA Awards	2024	Fans' Choice Top 10 – Male	The Boyz	Nominated	
Melon Music Awards	2018	Best New Male Artist Award	The Boyz	Won	
Melon Music Awards	2019	1theK Performance Award	The Boyz	Won	
Melon Music Awards	2020	1theK Original Content	The Boyz	Won	
Melon Music Awards	2021	Best Performance	The Boyz	Won	
MTV Video Music Awards Japan	2019	Rising Star Award	The Boyz	Won	
MTV Video Music Awards Japan	2023	Best Asia Group	The Boyz	Won	
Seoul Music Awards	2019	New Artist Award	The Boyz	Nominated	
Seoul Music Awards	2019	Popularity Award	The Boyz	Nominated	
Seoul Music Awards	2019	Hallyu Special Award	The Boyz	Nominated	
Seoul Music Awards	2020	QQ Music Most Popular K-Pop Artist Award	The Boyz	Nominated	
Seoul Music Awards	2020	Bonsang Award	The Boyz	Nominated	
Seoul Music Awards	2020	Popularity Award	The Boyz	Nominated	
Seoul Music Awards	2020	Hallyu Special Award	The Boyz	Nominated	
Seoul Music Awards	2021	Bonsang Award	Chase	Nominated	
Seoul Music Awards	2021	Popularity Award	The Boyz	Nominated	
Seoul Music Awards	2021	K-wave Popularity Award	The Boyz	Nominated	
Seoul Music Awards	2021	Best Performance Award	The Boyz	Won	
Seoul Music Awards	2022	Main Award (Bonsang)	The Boyz	Won	
Seoul Music Awards	2022	Popularity Award	The Boyz	Nominated	
Seoul Music Awards	2022	K-wave Popularity Award	The Boyz	Nominated	
Seoul Music Awards	2023	Main Award (Bonsang)	The Boyz	Nominated	
Seoul Music Awards	2023	Popularity Award	The Boyz	Nominated	
Seoul Music Awards	2023	Hallyu Special Award	The Boyz	Nominated	
Seoul Music Awards	2024	Main Award (Bonsang)	The Boyz	Nominated	
Seoul Music Awards	2024	Popularity Award	The Boyz	Nominated	
Seoul Music Awards	2024	Hallyu Special Award	The Boyz	Nominated	
Seoul Music Awards	2025	Main Prize (Bonsang)	The Boyz	Nominated	
Seoul Music Awards	2025	Popularity Award	The Boyz	Nominated	
Seoul Music Awards	2025	K-Wave Special Award	The Boyz	Nominated	
Seoul Music Awards	2025	K-pop World Choice – Group	The Boyz	Nominated	
Soribada Best K-Music Awards	2018	New Hallyu Rookie Award	The Boyz	Won	
Soribada Best K-Music Awards	2019	Rising Hot Star Award	The Boyz	Won	
Soribada Best K-Music Awards	2020	New Hallyu Male Performance Award	The Boyz	Won	
V Live Awards	2018	Global Rookie Top 5	The Boyz	Won	
V Live Awards	2019	Global Artist Top 10	The Boyz	Nominated	

=== State honors ===
Name of country or organization, year given, and name of honor or award
Country or organization	Year	Honor or Award	Ref.
South Korea (Note: Honors are given at the Korean Popular Culture and Arts Awards, arranged by the Korea Creative Content Agency and hosted by the Ministry of Culture, Sports and Tourism. They are awarded to those who have contributed to the arts and South Korea's pop culture.)	2023	Minister of Culture, Sports and Tourism Commendation	
