= Breaking Dawn (album) =

- Digital cover

Studio album by the Boyz
- Released: 17 March 2021
- Recorded: 2021
- Length: 26:42
- Label: Ariola Japan

The Boyz chronology
Chase (2020)	Breaking Dawn (2021)	Thrill-ing (2021)

Singles from Breaking Dawn
- 1. "Breaking Dawn" Released: March 2021

Breaking Dawn is the first Japanese studio album by South Korean boy group the Boyz. It was released on 17 March 2021, through Ariola Japan. The album debuted at number four on the Oricon Albums Chart, selling over 20,000 physical copies in its first week.

== Background ==
On January 12, The Boyz's first Japanese studio album was announced. It is the group's first Japanese comeback since their 2019 extended play Tattoo.

== Track listing ==
Breaking Dawn track listing
No.	Title	Lyrics	Music	Length
1.	"Prism"	JQ; Lee Yeon-ji; Exy	Appu Krishan; Michael Norris; Daniel Kim	3:21
2.	"Einstein"	JQ; Kim Jin; Bae Sung-hyun; Ahn Young-joo; Choi Ji-hye; Lee Yeon-ji; Sunwoo; Eric; Jacob	Daniel Kim; Stereo14	3:08
3.	"Breaking Dawn"	JQ; Moon Ye-rin; Shin Sae-rom; Jiwon; Sunwoo; Eric; lim@	Karri Mikkonen; Daniel Kim; Takey	3:17
4.	"Flag"	lilm@	Sean Alexander; SQVARE; Kiggen; Jinsol	3:55
5.	"Penalty"	lilm@	Daniel Kim; Shin Ki-Hyun; Lee Hae-Chan	3:02
6.	"Kiss Me If You Can"	JQ; Park Ji-Heui; Kim Jin; Lee Yeon-ji; Cha Yubin; Sunwoo; Eric; Jacob	Sean Michael Alexander; David Anthony Eames; SQVARE	3:29
7.	"Hush"	lilm@	David Amber; Andreas Öberg; Ninos Hanna	3:09
8.	"Closer"	Daniel Kim	Erik Lidbom; MLC	3:21
Total length:				26:42

== Charts ==
=== Weekly charts ===
Chart performance for Breaking Dawn
Chart (2021)	Peak position
Japan Hot Albums (Billboard Japan)	4
Japanese Albums (Oricon)	4

=== Yearly charts ===
Yearly chart performance for Breaking Dawn
Chart (2021)	Peak position
Top Albums Sales (Billboard Japan)	93
