= Bloom Bloom =

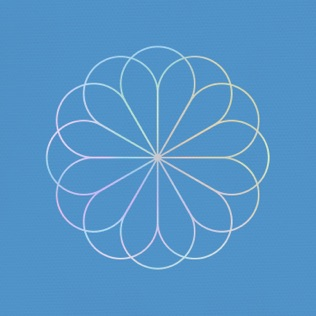
- Digital Cover

Single album by The Boyz
- Released: April 29, 2019
- Recorded: 2019
- Genre: Dance; Ballad
- Length: 10:53
- Language: Korean
- Label: Cre.ker Entertainment; Kakao M

The Boyz chronology
The Only (2018)	Bloom Bloom (2019)	Dreamlike (2019)

Singles from Bloom Bloom
- 1. "Bloom Bloom" Released: April 29

Bloom Bloom is the second single album by South Korean boy group The Boyz. It was released on April 29, 2019 through Cre.Ker Entertainment. The single album consists of three tracks.

== Background ==
The Boyz released their second single album Bloom Bloom and its lead single "Bloom Bloom" on April 29.

On May 7, The group received their first-ever music show win on SBS M's The Show by "Bloom Bloom".

== Track listing ==
Bloom Bloom track listing
No.	Title	Lyrics	Music	Arrangement	Length
1.	"Bloom Bloom"	Lee Seu-ran; Sunwoo (The Boyz); Eric (The Boyz)	Wonderkid; Shin Kung; Kyler Niko	Wonderkid; Shin Kung	3:44
2.	"Butterfly (몽중)"	Hwang Yoo-bin; Eric (The Boyz)	HYE SUNG; Charlotte Wilson; Jacob Obong; Francesa Louise Day	HYE SUNG	4:01
3.	"Clover"	The Boyz; Hwang Yoo-bin; Jung Ho-hyun (e.one)	Jung Ho-hyun (e.one)	Jung Ho-hyun (e.one)	3:07
Total length:					10:53

== Charts ==
Chart performance for Bloom Bloom
Chart (2021)	Peak position
South Korean Albums (Gaon)	2

== Accolades ==
Music program awards
Song	Program	Date	Ref.
"Bloom Bloom"	The Show	May 7, 2019	

== Release history ==
Release history and formats for Bloom Bloom
Region	Date	Format	Label
Various	April 29, 2019	Digital download; streaming	Cre.ker Entertainment; Kakao M
Various	April 29, 2019	CD	Cre.ker Entertainment; Kakao M
