= Tattoo (EP) =

- Digital Cover

EP by the Boyz
- Released: November 6, 2019
- Recorded: 2019
- Genre: Pop
- Length: 20:57
- Language: Japanese; Korean
- Label: Ariola Japan

The Boyz chronology
Dreamlike (2019)	Tattoo (2019)	Reveal (2020)

Singles from Tattoo
- 1. "Tattoo" Released: November 6

Tattoo is the first Japanese extended play by South Korean boy group the Boyz. It was released on November 6, 2019, through Ariola Japan. The EP consists of six tracks.

== Background ==
On November 6, the Boyz officially debuted in Japan with the release of their first Japanese extended play Tattoo and its lead single with the same name.

== Track listing ==
Tattoo track listing
No.	Title	Lyrics	Music	Arrangement	Length
1.	"Back All Black"	Bon Bon	Daniel Kim; Paul Najjar	Erik Lidbom; Paul Najjar	3:21
2.	"Tattoo"	Bon Bon	Daniel Kim; Dani Paz; Maria Marcus	Maria Marcus; Dani Paz	3:52
3.	"Espionage"	Bon Bon	Daniel Kim; Adam Ben Yahia	Adam Ben Yahia	3:16
4.	"Stupid Sorry"	Bon Bon	Sean Alexander; Phil Schwan; Drew Ryan Scott	Phil Schwan	3:30
5.	"Bye Bye Bye"	Bon Bon	Geek Boy Al Swettenham; Christopher Casper Golighty; Steven Lee	Geek Boy Al Swettenham	3:29
6.	"Brighter"	Bon Bon	Daniel Kim; Takey	Takey	3:27
Total length:					20:57

== Charts ==
Chart performance for Tattoo
Chart (2019)	Peak position
Japan Hot Albums (Billboard Japan)	4
Japanese Albums (Oricon)	2

== Release history ==
Release history and formats for Tattoo
Region	Date	Format	Label
Various	November 6, 2019	Digital download; streaming	Ariola Japan
Various	November 6, 2019	CD	Ariola Japan
