= Reveal (The Boyz album) =

- Digital Cover

Studio album by The Boyz
- Released: February 10, 2020
- Recorded: 2020
- Genre: K-pop
- Length: 31:22
- Language: Korean
- Label: Cre.ker Entertainment; Kakao M

The Boyz chronology
Tattoo (2019)	Reveal (2020)	Chase (2020)

Singles from Reveal
- 1. "Reveal" Released: February 10

Reveal is the debut studio album by South Korean boy group The Boyz. It was released on February 10, 2020 through Cre.Ker Entertainment. The album consists of nine tracks.

== Background ==
On February 10, the Boyz released their first studio album Reveal and its lead single "Reveal".

== Track listing ==
Reveal track listing
No.	Title	Lyrics	Music	Arrangement	Length
1.	"Ego"	Jo Eun-oh; JQ (Makeumine Works); Kim Hye-ji (Makeumine Works)	Poptime; Kriz; Ollipop	Poptime	3:01
2.	"Reveal"	Hwang Yoo-bin	Drew Ryan Scott; Justin Reinstein; Phil Schwan; Sean Michael Alexander	Justin Reinstein; Phil Schwan	3:22
3.	"Shake You Down"	Kenzie	Kenzie; Andrew Choi; Moonshine	Kenzie; Andrew Choi; Moonshine	3:12
4.	"Scar (흔적)" (sung by Juyeon, Q, Ju Haknyeon, Sunwoo, and Eric)	JQ (Makeumine Works); BOMNA (Makeumine Works); Jeong Jae-yeon (Makeumine Works); Serie (Makeumine Works); Kim Hye-ji (Makeumine Works); Sunwoo (The Boyz); Eric (The Boyz)	Evan Berard; Daniel Kim	Evan Berard	3:20
5.	"Salty"	Jo Yoon-kyung	Kaelyn Behr; Anthony Russo; Shaylen Carroll; Rudy Sandapa; MZMC	Styalz Fuego; Rudy Sandapa	3:02
6.	"Break Your Rules (환상고백)"	Hwang Yoo-bin; Sunwoo (The Boyz)	John Mars; Gabriel Brandes; Cazzi Opeia; Ellen Berg	John Mars	3:25
7.	"Wings (胡蝶夢)"	Ji Ye-won (153/Joombas)	Hyuk Shin (153/Joombas); Jeff Lewis	Hyuk Shin (153/Joombas); Mrey (153/Joombas)	3:53
8.	"Goodbye (시간의 숲)" (sung by Sangyeon, Jacob, Younghoon, Hyunjae, Kevin, and New)	Ji Ye-won (153/Joombas)	Matthew Tishler; Park In-young; Lee Ju-Hyung (MonoTree)	Matthew Tishler; Park In-young	3:59
9.	"Spring Snow"	The Boyz; Jeong Yun (153/Joombas); Moon Kim (153/Joombas)	Moon Kim (153/Joombas); KYUM LYK (153/Joombas); Sangyeon (The Boyz); Jacob (The Boyz); Kevin (The Boyz)	KYUM LYK (153/Joombas)	4:04
Total length:					31:22

== Charts ==
Chart performance for Reveal
Chart (2020)	Peak position
Japanese Albums (Oricon)	32
South Korean Albums (Gaon)	1

== Release history ==
Release history and formats for Reveal
Region	Date	Format	Label
Various	February 10, 2020	Digital download; streaming	Cre.ker Entertainment; Kakao M
Various	February 10, 2020	CD	Cre.ker Entertainment; Kakao M
