= Be Aware =

- Digital cover

EP by The Boyz
- Released: August 16, 2022
- Recorded: 2022
- Length: 19:20
- Language: Korean
- Labels: IST; Kakao

The Boyz chronology
She's the Boss (2022)	Be Aware (2022)	Be Awake (2023)

Singles from Be Aware
- 1. "Timeless" Released: August 8, 2022; 2. "Whisper" Released: August 16, 2022

Be Aware is the seventh extended play by South Korean boy group The Boyz. It was released on August 16, 2022 through IST Entertainment. The EP consists of six tracks, including the lead single "Whisper", and its physical release was made available in three versions. The EP's physical and Meta versions collectively sold over 569,000 copies in their first week of release in South Korea and debuted at numbers one and two on the Circle Album Chart.

== Background ==
On August 16, The Boyz released their seventh extended play Be Aware.

A teaser for the music video was released on August 13, with the full music video released on August 16.

== Track listing ==
Be Aware track listing
No.	Title	Lyrics	Music	Arrangement	Length
1.	"Whisper"	Jo Yoon-kyung; Sunwoo (The Boyz); Jacob (The Boyz)	Willie Weeks; Kyler Niko	Willie Weeks	3:11
2.	"Bump & Love"	Jo Yoon-kyung; Sunwoo (The Boyz); Hyunjae (The Boyz); New (The Boyz)	Barry Cohen; Ronnie Icon; Ryan S. Jhun; MZMC	Gingerbread; Wyatt Sanders; Ryan S. Jhun; MZMC	3:44
3.	"C.O.D.E"	Yoon (Artiffect); Sunwoo (The Boyz)	Avenue 52 (Artiffect); Sqvare (Artiffect); Toyo	Toyo; Avenue 52 (Artiffect)	2:52
4.	"Levitating" (무중력; Mujunglyeog)	Jo Yoon-kyung; Sunwoo (The Boyz)	KZ; Kim Tae-Young; Honeysweat; Chris Wahle; Andreas Öhrn	KZ; Kim Tae-Young; Honeysweat	3:00
5.	"Survive the Night"	Sunwoo (The Boyz)	Rio; Avenue 52 (Artiffect); Sqvare (Artiffect)	Rio	3:24
6.	"Timeless"	Sangyeon (The Boyz); Hyunjae (The Boyz); New (The Boyz); Q (The Boyz); Sunwoo (The Boyz)	William Segerdahl; Matilda Thompson; Val Del Prete (153/Joombas); Martin Tjärnberg	William Segerdahl; Martin Tjärnberg	3:09
Total length:					19:20

== Charts ==
=== Weekly charts ===
Weekly chart performance for Be Aware
Chart (2022)	Peak position
Japanese Albums (Oricon)	21
Japanese Combined Albums (Oricon)	29
South Korean Albums (Circle)	1

=== Monthly charts ===
Monthly chart performance for Be Aware
Chart (2022)	Peak position
South Korean Albums (Circle)	3

=== Year-end charts ===
Year-end chart performance for Be Aware
Chart (2022)	Position
South Korean Albums (Circle)	40
South Korean Albums (Circle) META Album	100

== Accolades ==
Music program awards
Song	Program	Date	Ref.
"Whisper"	Music Bank	August 26, 2022	
"Whisper"	Show! Music Core	August 27, 2022	

== Certifications ==
Certifications for Be Aware
Region	Certification	Certified units/sales
South Korea (KMCA)	Platinum	250,000^{^}
^{^} Shipments figures based on certification alone.

== Release history ==
Release history and formats for Be Aware
Region	Date	Format	Label
Various	August 16, 2022	Digital download; streaming	IST; Kakao
Various	August 16, 2022	CD	IST; Kakao
