= Thrill-ing =

- Digital cover

EP by The Boyz
- Released: August 9, 2021
- Recorded: 2021
- Genre: Hip hop; synth-pop; PBR&B
- Length: 19:32
- Language: Korean
- Label: Cre.ker Entertainment; Kakao

The Boyz chronology
Breaking Dawn (2021)	Thrill-ing (2021)	Maverick (2021)

Singles from Thrill-ing
- 1. "Thrill Ride" Released: August 9, 2021

Thrill-ing is the sixth extended play by South Korean boy group The Boyz. It was released on August 9, 2021 through Cre.Ker Entertainment. The EP consists of six tracks, including the lead single "Thrill Ride".

== Background ==
On June 21, Cre.ker Entertainment announced that The Boyz will be releasing their sixth extended play in August. This will be their first comeback since the conclusion of Kingdom: Legendary War and their first South Korean release in almost a year since 2020's Chase.

On July 26, it was revealed that the title of the extended play will be Thrill-ing and will be released on August 9, with "Thrill Ride" as the lead single. Along with the announcement, a schedule for the group's comeback was also released. It was hinted by members Younghoon and Hyunjae in their Singles Korea interview that the comeback will be defined by two keywords: energy and party.

On July 27, the first batch of concept photos titled "Splash" was released on the group's social media accounts. On July 28, the second batch of concept photos titled "Bang" was released, while on July 29, the third set was called "Kick" was released.

On July 31, the track list of the album was released.

== Track listing ==
Thrill-ing track listing
No.	Title	Lyrics	Music	Arrangement	Length
1.	"Thrill Ride"	Jo Yoon-kyung; Sunwoo (The Boyz); Eric (The Boyz)	Albin Nordqvist; Gabriel Brandes	Albin Nordqvist	3:16
2.	"Out of Control" (환상열차; Hwansangyeolcha)	Ji Ye-won (153/Joombas); Q (The Boyz)	jyll; Rasmus Gregersen; Daniel Michael Victor	Ralz; DMV; jyll	3:35
3.	"Dancing Till We Drop"	danke	Chris Wahle	Chris Wahle	3:35
4.	"Nightmares" (黑花; Black Flower)	Jo Yoon-kyung	dBoi! (Oceancave); Andy Love	dBoi! (Oceancave)	3:03
5.	"Merry Bad Ending"	Zaya (153/Joombas); Sunwoo (The Boyz)	Anthony Russo; Anthony Pavel; Jackson Morgan; Kaelyn Behr; Rudy Sandapa; MZMC	Styalz Fuego; Rudy Sandapa	3:23
6.	"B.O.Y (Bet On You)"	Ji Ye-won (153/Joombas); Sunwoo (The Boyz); Eric (The Boyz)	Ryan Jhun; Alexander Standal Pavelich; Coucheron; Raoul Chen; Tim North	Ryan Jhun; Coucheron; Raoul Chen	2:40
Total length:					19:32

== Charts ==
=== Weekly charts ===
Weekly chart performance for Thrill-ing
Chart (2021)	Peak position
Japanese Albums (Oricon)	8
South Korean Albums (Gaon)	1

=== Year-end charts ===
Year-end chart performance for Thrill-ing
Chart (2021)	Position
South Korean Albums (Gaon)	21

== Certifications ==
Certifications for Thrill-ing
Region	Certification	Certified units/sales
South Korea (KMCA)	2× Platinum	500,000^{^}
^{^} Shipments figures based on certification alone.

== Accolades ==
Music program awards
Song	Program	Date	Ref.
"Thrill Ride"	The Show	August 17, 2021	
"Thrill Ride"	Show Champion	August 18, 2021	
"Thrill Ride"	M Countdown	August 19, 2021	
"Thrill Ride"	Music Bank	August 20, 2021	
"Thrill Ride"	Show! Music Core	August 21, 2021	

== Release history ==
Release history and formats for Thrill-ing
Region	Date	Format	Label
Various	August 9, 2021	Digital download; streaming	Cre.ker Entertainment; Kakao Entertainment
Various	August 9, 2021	CD	Cre.ker Entertainment; Kakao Entertainment
