= Maverick (single album) =

- Digital cover

Single album by The Boyz
- Released: November 1, 2021
- Recorded: 2021
- Genre: Hip hop; R&B
- Length: 10:21
- Language: Korean
- Label: Cre.ker Entertainment; Kakao

The Boyz chronology
Thrill-ing (2021)	Maverick (2021)	She's The Boss (2022)

Singles from Maverick
- 1. "Maverick" Released: November 1, 2021

Maverick is the third single album by South Korean boy group The Boyz. It was released on November 1, 2021 through Cre.Ker Entertainment. The single album consists of three tracks, including the lead single "Maverick".

== Background ==
On November 1, The Boyz made their comeback with their third single album Maverick with the lead single of the same name.

== Track listing ==
No.	Title	Lyrics	Music	Arrangement	Length
1.	"Maverick"	Jo Yoon-kyung; danke; Kyler Niko; Ronnie Icon	Kyler Niko; Ronnie Icon; Ludwig Lindell	Ludwig Lindell	3:28
2.	"Hypnotized"	Jonghan	Jinbyjin; Ryan Ashley	Jinbyjin	3:10
3.	"Russian Roulette"	Jo Yoon-kyung	JJ Evans (153/Joombas); Flow Blow	Flow Blow	3:41
Total length:					10:21

== Charts ==
=== Weekly charts ===
Weekly chart performance for Maverick
Chart (2021)	Peak position
South Korean Albums (Gaon)	1

=== Year-end charts ===
Year-end chart performance for Maverick
Chart (2021)	Position
South Korean Albums (Gaon)	22

== Certifications ==
Certifications for Maverick
Region	Certification	Certified units/sales
South Korea (KMCA)	2× Platinum	500,000^{^}
^{^} Shipments figures based on certification alone.

== Accolades ==
Music program awards
Song	Program	Date	Ref.
"Maverick"	The Show	November 9, 2021	
"Maverick"	Show Champion	November 10, 2021	
"Maverick"	Music Bank	November 12, 2021	
"Maverick"	Show! Music Core	November 13, 2021	
"Maverick"	Inkigayo	November 14, 2021	

== Release history ==
Release history and formats for Maverick
Region	Date	Format	Label
Various	November 1, 2021	Digital download; streaming	Cre.ker Entertainment; Kakao Entertainment
Various	November 1, 2021	CD	Cre.ker Entertainment; Kakao Entertainment
