= Dreamlike (EP) =

- Digital Cover

EP by The Boyz
- Released: August 19, 2019
- Recorded: 2019
- Genre: Dance
- Length: 19:56
- Language: Korean
- Label: Cre.ker Entertainment; Kakao M

The Boyz chronology
Bloom Bloom (2019)	Dreamlike (2019)	Tattoo (2019)

Singles from Dreamlike
- 1. "D.D.D." Released: August 19

Dreamlike is the fourth extended play by South Korean boy group the Boyz. It was released on August 19, 2019, through Cre.ker Entertainment. The EP consists of six tracks. It is also served as the group's final release to feature the member Hwall before his departure from the group in October 2019.

== Background ==
The Boyz released their fourth extended play Dreamlike and its lead single "D.D.D" on August 19.

== Track listing ==
Dreamlike track listing
No.	Title	Lyrics	Music	Arrangement	Length
1.	"Water"	Misfit; Sunwoo (The Boyz); Eric (The Boyz)	LDN Noise; Gustav Karlstrom; 9ROTA; Jo Michael (Singing Beetle)	LDN Noise; Gustav Karlstrom; 9ROTA; Jo Michael (Singing Beetle)	3:19
2.	"D.D.D."	Jo Yoon-kyung; Sunwoo (The Boyz)	Wonderkid; Shin Kung; Fredrik Figge Bostrom; Moon Kim	Wonderkid; Shin Kung	3:32
3.	"Complete Me"	13 (SCORE, Megatone); J.Rise; Sunwoo (The Boyz); Eric (The Boyz)	13 (SCORE, Megatone)	13 (SCORE, Megatone)	3:14
4.	"Summer Time"	1of1; Lee Dong-woo	1of1; plusNONE; Lee Dong-woo	1of1; plusNONE	3:17
5.	"Going High (위로)"	1of1	1of1; Lee Dong-woo; NOZY; Yoo Doo-young	1of1	3:28
6.	"Daydream"	Jo Yoon-kyung	Andrew Bazzi; Jonathan Hoskins; MZMC	Jonathan Hoskins; MZMC	3:03
Total length:					19:56

== Charts ==
Chart performance for Dreamlike
Chart (2019)	Peak position
Japanese Albums (Oricon)	18
South Korean Albums (Gaon)	2

== Release history ==
Release history and formats for Dreamlike
Region	Date	Format	Label
Various	August 19, 2019	Digital download; streaming	Cre.ker Entertainment; Kakao M
Various	August 19, 2019	CD	Cre.ker Entertainment; Kakao M
