= The Only (EP) =

- Digital Cover

EP by The Boyz
- Released: November 29, 2018
- Recorded: 2018
- Genre: Dance; Ballad
- Length: 19:36
- Language: Korean
- Label: Cre.ker Entertainment; Kakao M

The Boyz chronology
The Sphere (2018)	The Only (2018)	Bloom Bloom (2019)

Singles from The Only
- 1. "No Air" Released: November 29, 2018

The Only is the third extended play by South Korean boy group The Boyz. It was released on November 29, 2018 through Cre.ker Entertainment. The EP consists of six tracks.

== Background ==
The Boyz released their third extended play The Only and its lead single "No Air" on November 29, 2018.

== Track listing ==
The Only track listing
No.	Title	Lyrics	Music	Arrangement	Length
1.	"Breath to Breath"		Wonderkid	Wonderkid	0:57
2.	"No Air"	ROYDO; Sunwoo (The Boyz)	Wonderkid; ROYDO	Wonderkid	4:04
3.	"Only One"	Shin Kung; Dal Lee; BreadBeat; Ollounder; Sunwoo (The Boyz)	Wonderkid; Shin Kung; BreadBeat; Ollounder	Wonderkid	3:25
4.	"Lucid Dream (자각몽)"	Jo Yoon-kyung	TOYO; Drew Ryan Scott; Sean Michael Alexander	TOYO	3:20
5.	"36.5° (Melting Heart)"	Hwang Yoo-bin; Sunwoo (The Boyz)	Kriz; Curtis F	Kriz; Curtis F	4:04
6.	"4Ever"	1of1	1of1; Lee Dong-woo	1of1	3:44
Total length:					19:36

== Charts ==
Chart performance for The Only
Chart (2018)	Peak position
Japanese Albums (Oricon)	39
South Korean Albums (Gaon)	3

== Release history ==
Release history and formats for The Only
Region	Date	Format	Label
Various	November 29, 2018	Digital download; streaming	Cre.ker Entertainment; Kakao M
Various	November 29, 2018	CD	Cre.ker Entertainment; Kakao M
