= The Boyz (South Korean band) =

South Korean boy group

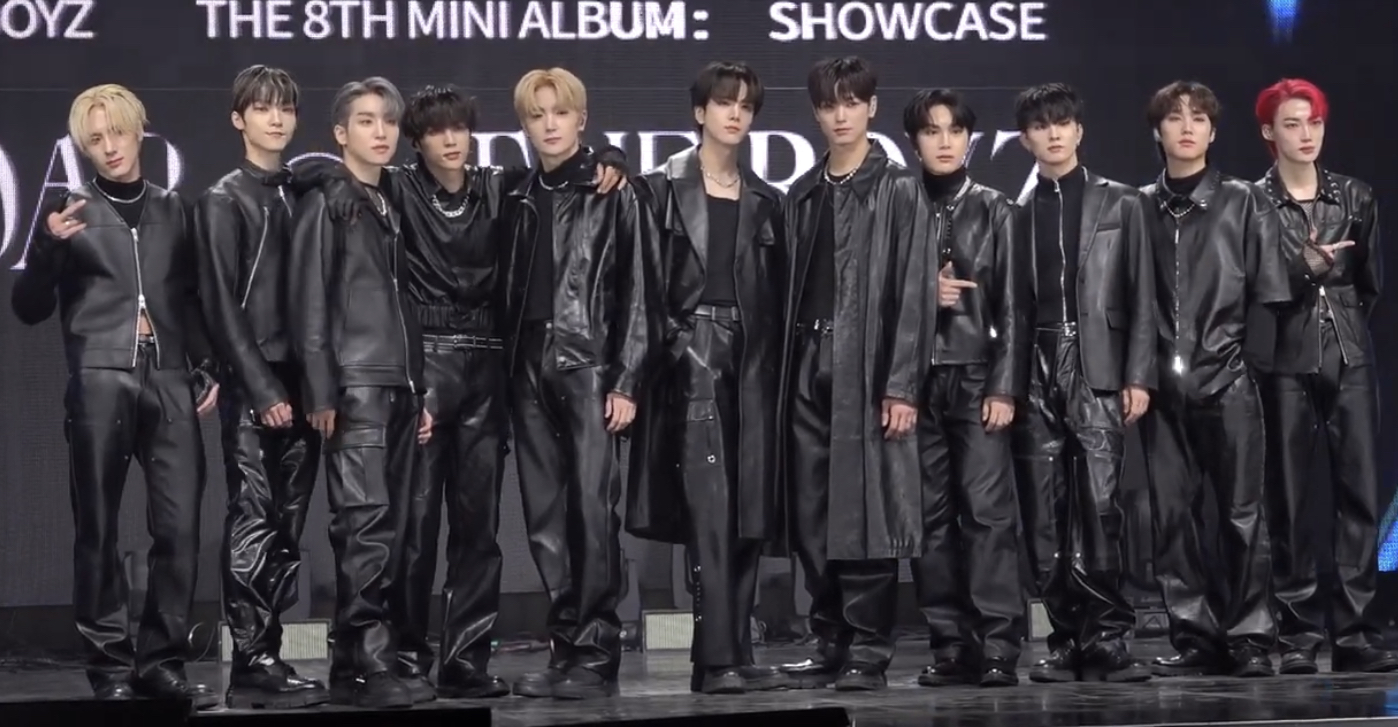
- The Boyz in February 2023; L-R: Eric, Kevin, Sangyeon, Sunwoo, Hyunjae, Younghoon, Juyeon, Haknyeon, Q, Jacob, and New

Background information
- Origin: Seoul, South Korea
- Genres: K-pop; hip hop; R&B; synthpop
- Years active: 2017–present
- Labels: IST; Ariola Japan; Universal; One Hundred
- Members: Sangyeon; Jacob; Younghoon; Hyunjae; Juyeon; Kevin; Q; Sunwoo; Eric
- Past members: Hwall; Ju Haknyeon; New
- Website: theboyz.kr theboyz.jp

The Boyz (Korean: 더보이즈) is a South Korean boy band formed by IST Entertainment (initially formed exclusively by Cre.ker Entertainment before merging with what was formerly known as Play M Entertainment) and managed by One Hundred. The group debuted on December 6, 2017, with the lead single "Boy" from the extended play (EP) The First. The group consists of nine members: Sangyeon, Jacob, Younghoon, Hyunjae, Juyeon, Kevin, Q, Sunwoo, and Eric. The Boyz was originally a twelve member group; Hwall departed in October 2019, Ju Haknyeon in June 2025 and New in August 2026.

== History ==
=== Pre-debut ===
In 2016 and early 2017, various members appeared in different artists' music videos, as cameos or lead roles. Kevin was first introduced to the public as a contestant on Kpop Star 6, where he was eliminated early in the competition. Following this, he had the chance to release an OST for the drama Saimdang, Light's Diary in April 2017. Sunwoo became a contestant on High School Rapper in January 2017, where he was also eliminated early in the competition. In March 2017, Ju Haknyeon participated in Produce 101 and reached 19th place during the final episode.

On July 4, the group was first announced as Cre.kerz, through the agency's social medias. On July 18, their official name was revealed. From August 23 to October 11, their first reality show Flower Snack aired, resulting in the release of the song "I'm Your Boy". They held their first fanmeeting "Heart to Heart" for 1,000 fans on October 28.

In November, the twelve members signed contracts as exclusive models for the school uniform brand Skoolooks, as well as the cosmetic brand Siero Cosmetic.

On December 4, Cre.ker Entertainment confirmed that the group had signed a contract with Sony Music for their Japan promotions.

=== 2017–2018: Debut and early days ===
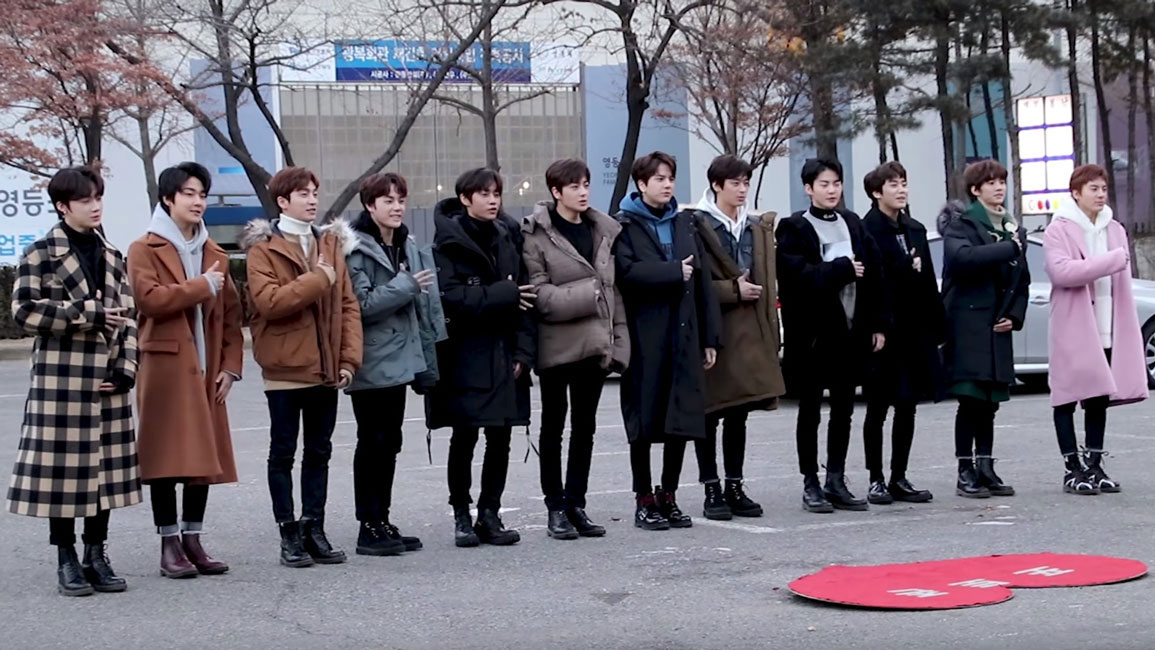
The Boyz in 2018

On December 6, The Boyz officially debuted with the release of their first extended play The First and its lead single "Boy". From February 12 to March 15, their second reality show The 100 aired on V Live. As the result of this show, they held an online mini-concert on March 23. Sangyeon had his first fixed cast appearance on the show We are the One that aired from February 26 until its cancellation on March 26. The Boyz were invited to perform at the 12th Asian Film Awards on March 17 in Macau, their first overseas performance.

The group released their second extended play The Start and its lead single "Giddy Up" on April 3, 2018. Due to health problems, Hwall couldn't promote with the group and subsequently had to halt all activities for three months. The twelve members, with Hwall back from his hiatus, released a special digital single titled "Keeper" on July 12, which was produced by Block B's Park Kyung. On July 24, they won their first "Rookie Award" during the Korea Brand Awards. On August 30, the group won another "Rookie Award" at the Soribada Best K-Music Awards. On September 5, they made their first comeback in 5 months with the single The Sphere and the song "Right Here". The group released their third extended play The Only and its lead single "No Air" on November 29, 2018. On December 1, the group won another "Best New Male Artist Award" at the 2018 Melon Music Awards.

=== 2019: Japanese debut and Hwall's departure ===
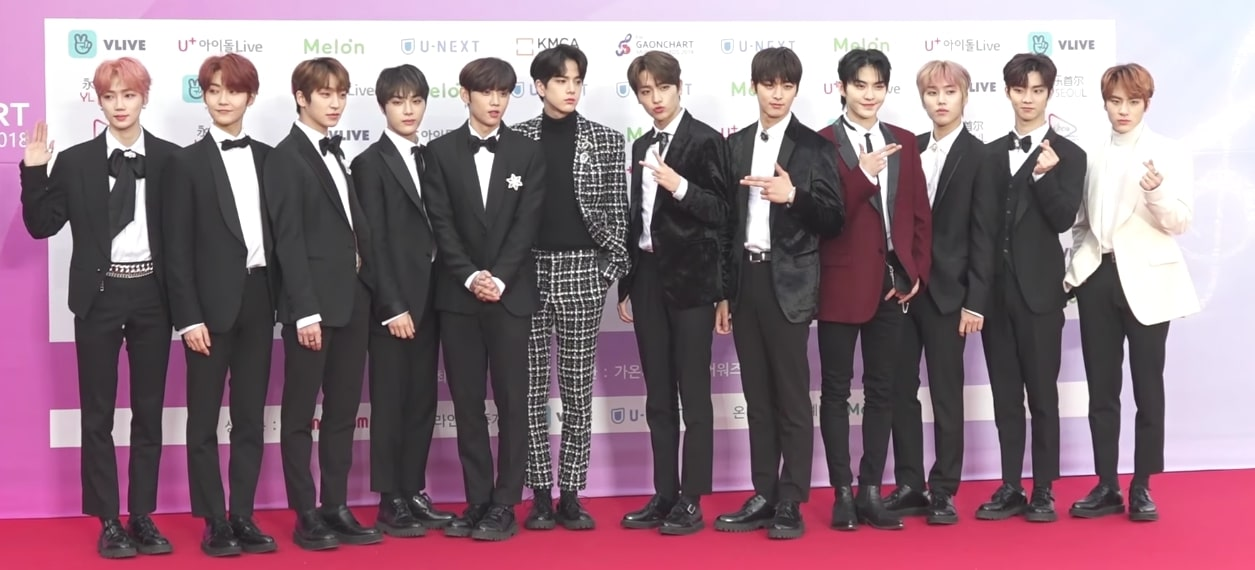
The Boyz in 2019

The group released their second single album Bloom Bloom and its lead single "Bloom Bloom" on April 29. On May 7, The Boyz received their first-ever music show win on SBS M's The Show. The group released their fourth extended play Dreamlike and its lead single "D.D.D" on August 19. On October 23, Hwall officially left the group due to health issues and pursued a solo and acting career afterwards.

On November 6, The Boyz officially debuted in Japan with the release of their first Japanese extended play Tattoo and its lead single with the same name. On December 6, the group released a special digital single titled "White (화이트)" to commemorate their second anniversary. Between December 11 and 20, the group toured in Berlin, Paris, London, and Amsterdam as part of their European tour titled Dreamlike.

=== 2020–2021: Kingdom Survival and commercial success ===
On February 10, 2020, the group released their first studio album Reveal and its lead single "Reveal". On March 20, it was announced that the group will join Mnet's reality television competition Road to Kingdom. On June 12, they released their new song "Checkmate" for the show's finale. The group eventually finished in first place, winning the show and securing a spot in upcoming Mnet program Kingdom: Legendary War. Their fifth EP Chase was released on September 21 with the lead single "The Stealer". On December 7, the group released a special digital single titled "Christmassy!", to commemorate their third anniversary with 'The Azit: 永華' promotions.

On January 12, 2021, it was announced that the group will release their first Japanese studio album Breaking Dawn on March 17. The Boyz participated in Kingdom: Legendary War, starting from April, where the group finished in second place. On July 11, The Boyz released the promotional single "Drink It" through Universe Music for the mobile application, Universe. They released their sixth extended play Thrill-ing on August 9, with the lead single "Thrill Ride" was described as a trendy hip-hop. On August 20, they won their first "public broadcasting" music show trophy on KBS's Music Bank. The EP sold 523,630 copies in the first week of its release on Hanteo Chart and making them became the eighth-highest first-week sales of any boy group in Hanteo Chart. On September 17, Kakao Entertainment announced The Boyz's company, Cre.ker Entertainment and PlayM Entertainment, will merge to launch a new integrated label. On October 2, The Boyz won "Artist of the Year" on 2021 The Fact Music Awards. On November 1, The Boyz released their third single album Maverick. The single consists of three-track including the hip-hop lead single "Maverick". On December 6, the group released a special digital single titled "Candles", to commemorate their fourth anniversary.

=== 2022–2024: Be Aware, Be Awake, Phantasy, and move to One Hundred ===
On May 27, 2022, The Boyz released their second Japanese extended play She's the Boss, the first release under their new label, Universal Music IST. On June 17, 2022, The Boyz released their second promotional single "Sweet" through Universe. On August 16, The Boyz released their seventh extended play Be Aware. On August 30, it was announced that Sunwoo would be suspending activities due to health issues.

On February 20, 2023, The Boyz released their eighth EP Be Awake. The EP consists of six-tracks with the lead single "Roar", which was described as a R&B Pop dance song. On July 25, the group announced the release of their second Korean studio album, Phantasy, which was divided into three parts, with the first part, Christmas in August, being released on August 7. On October 25, the group announced the second part of Phantasy, Sixth Sense, which was released on November 20. The third and final part of Phantasy, Love Letter was released on March 18, 2024. The lead single of this part was "Nectar", described as 'emotional-but-hopeful'.

According to label One Hundred on November 15, 2024, all members of The Boyz will sign with them after their contract with IST ends on December 5.

=== 2025–present: Sangyeon's military enlistment and Ju Haknyeon's and New's departures ===
On January 23, 2025, One Hundred announced that Sangyeon will be enlisting in the military band on March 17. On February 24, it was announced that they would come back with their third studio album Unexpected, released on March 17.

On June 18, 2025, One Hundred announced Ju Haknyeon's departure from the group, citing a personal issue. His departure came two days after the label had announced he would be going on a hiatus for personal reasons.

On August 6, 2026, it was announced that The Boyz will continue as a nine-member group under a new label, without New.

On August 27, 2026, it was reported that New had agreed to terminate his exclusive contract with One Hundred Label. The two parties agreed to end the contract on the condition that New return the signing payment. Unlike the other nine members of The Boyz, who had previously notified the agency of their intention to terminate their contracts and initiated legal proceedings, New did not participate in the proceedings. Following the termination, New is preparing for future activities independently, while his future agency and specific plans have yet to be announced.

== Members ==
Adapted from their official website.

Current

- Jacob (제이콥) – vocalist, rapper
- Younghoon (영훈) – vocalist
- Hyunjae (현재) – vocalist, dancer
- Juyeon (주연) – dancer, vocalist
- Kevin (케빈) – vocalist
- Q (큐) – dancer, vocalist
- Sunwoo (선우) – rapper
- Eric (에릭) – rapper

Current (inactive)

- Sangyeon (상연) – leader, vocalist (Inactive due to military service)

Former

- Hwall (활) – dancer, rapper
- Ju Haknyeon (주학년) – dancer, vocalist
- New (뉴) – vocalist

== Discography ==
Korean albums

- Reveal (2020)
- Phantasy (2024)
- Unexpected (2025)

Japanese albums

- Breaking Dawn (2021)
- Delicious (2023)
- Gibberish (2024)

== Filmography ==
=== Reality shows ===
| Year | Title | Notes |
|---|---|---|
| 2017 | Flower Snack | |
| 2018–2019 | Come On! The Boyz | Come On! The Boyz |
| 2018–2019 | Come On! The Boyz | Come On! The Boyz – What's Your No. |
| 2018–2019 | Come On! The Boyz | Come On! The Boyz – Summer Vacation RPG Edition |
| 2018–2019 | Come On! The Boyz | Come On! The Boyz School |
| 2018–2019 | Come On! The Boyz | Come On! The Boyz in NY |
| 2018 | THE 100 | V Live |
| 2018 | Our Happy Home | |
| 2018 | Switch | |
| 2018 | Thumping Travel | |
| 2018–2020 | Otoseyo | |
| 2020 | Are You Hungry? | |
| 2020 | Road to Kingdom | Winner |
| 2021 | Kingdom: Legendary War | 2nd Place |
| 2021 | Chemi-mate ZZG The Boyz | Universe |
| 2021 | SSAP-DANCE The Boyz | Universe |
| 2021 | The Blood: Death Match | Universe |
| 2021 | DND(Do Not Disturb) | Universe |
| 2021 | Fitness Bboyz | |
| 2021 | The Boyz : Time Out | |
| 2022 | Immersive The Boyz | Universe |
| 2022 | Outing! The Boyz | Come On! The Boyz in GOD-SAENG |
| 2022 | The Boyz's Heaven and Hell | |

== Videography ==
=== Music videos ===
List of music videos, showing year released and directors
| Title | Year | Director(s) | Ref. |
Korean
| "I'm Your Boy" | 2017 | Choi Young-ji, Kim Mi-hye (Purple Straw Film) | |
| "Boy" (소년) | 2017 | Naive Creative Production | |
| "Walkin' In Time" (시간이 안 지나가) | 2018 | Roh Sang-yoon (Haus of Team/filmbyteam) | |
| "Giddy Up" | 2018 | Naive Creative Production | |
| "Keeper" (지킬게) | 2018 | Kim Ja-kyoung (Flexible Pictures) | |
| "Right Here" | 2018 | Kim Ja-kyoung (Flexible Pictures) | |
| "No Air" | 2018 | Yoo Sung-kyun (Sunny Visual) | |
| "Bloom Bloom" | 2019 | Shin Hee-won (ST-WT) | |
| "D.D.D" | 2019 | Zanybros | |
| "White" (화이트) | 2019 | Unknown | —N/a |
| "Reveal" | 2020 | Jo Beom-jin (VM Project) | |
| "The Stealer" | 2020 | Roh Sang-yoon, Jeong Hae-one (Haus of Team/filmbyteam) | |
| "Christmassy! | 2020 | Roh Sang-yoon, Jeong Hae-one (Haus of Team/filmbyteam) | |
| "Drink It" | 2021 | Shin Hee-won (ST-WT) | |
| "Thrill Ride" | 2021 | Roh Sang-yoon, Jeong Hae-one (Haus of Team) | |
| "Maverick" | 2021 | Roh Sang-yoon, Jeong Hae-one (Haus of Team) | |
| "Echo" | 2022 | Zanybros | |
| "Sweet" | 2022 | 725 (SL8 Visual Lab) | |
| "Timeless" | 2022 | Lee Joon-mo (Haesumok) | |
| "Whisper" | 2022 | Yeom Woo-jin | |
| "Last Man Standing" | 2022 | ILLUMIN | |
| "All About You" | 2022 | Jan'Qui | |
| "Roar" | 2023 | Rigend Film | |
| "LIP GLOSS" | 2023 | Shin Hee-won (ST-WT) | |
| "Passion Fruit"(Special Unit) (Performance Video) | 2023 | Seo Dong-hyuk (FLIPEVIL) | |
| "Watch It" | 2023 | Lee Hye-in (2eehyeinfilm) | |
| "Honey"(Special Unit) | 2024 | Oh Eun-ho | |
| "Rat In The Trap"(Special Unit) | 2024 | Lee In-hoon (SEGAJI Video) | |
| "Nectar" | 2024 | Lee Hye-in (2eehyeinfilm) | |
| "Trigger(導火線) | 2024 | Samson (Highqualityfish) | |
| "VVV" | 2025 | Sunnyvisual | |
Japanese
| "Tattoo" | 2019 | WOOJE KIM (ETUI Collective) | |
| "Breaking Dawn" | 2021 | OUI KIM | |
| "She's The Boss" | 2022 | SUSHIVISUAL | |
| "Delicious" | 2023 | Lee Jaedon, Strtsphr | |
| "Gibberish" | 2024 | YUANN | |

== Concerts and tours ==
=== Headlining tours ===
==== The Boyz World Tour: The B Zone ====
| Date | City | Country | Venue |
North America
| May 29, 2022 | Los Angeles | United States | Pasadena Civic Auditorium |
| June 1, 2022 | Chicago | United States | Rosemont Theatre |
| June 3, 2022 | Newark | United States | New Jersey Performing Arts Center |
| June 5, 2022 | Atlanta | United States | Coca-Cola Roxy |
Europe
| June 20, 2022 | London | United Kingdom | OVO Arena |
| June 22, 2022 | Rotterdam | Netherlands | RTM Stage |
| June 25, 2022 | Paris | France | La Seine Musicale |
| June 28, 2022 | Berlin | Germany | Verti Music Hall |
Asia
| July 11, 2022 | Jakarta | Indonesia | Senayan Indoor Tennis Stadium |
| July 23, 2022 | Bangkok | Thailand | Thunder Dome |
| July 24, 2022 | Bangkok | Thailand | Thunder Dome |
| August 5, 2022 | Seoul | South Korea | KSPO Dome |
| August 6, 2022 | Seoul | South Korea | KSPO Dome |
| August 7, 2022 | Seoul | South Korea | KSPO Dome |
| October 15, 2022 | Kobe | Japan | Kobe World Hall |
| October 16, 2022 | Kobe | Japan | Kobe World Hall |
| October 22, 2022 | Fukuoka | Japan | Fukuoka Convention Center |
| October 23, 2022 | Fukuoka | Japan | Fukuoka Convention Center |
| November 5, 2022 | Tokyo | Japan | Musashino Forest Sport Plaza |
| November 6, 2022 | Tokyo | Japan | Musashino Forest Sport Plaza |
Total

==== The Boyz 2nd World Tour: Zeneration (2023) ====
| Date | City | Country | Venue |
Asia
| May 19, 2023 | Seoul | South Korea | KSPO Dome |
| May 20, 2023 | Seoul | South Korea | KSPO Dome |
| May 21, 2023 | Seoul | South Korea | KSPO Dome |
| May 31, 2023 | Niigata | Japan | Niigata Prefectural Civic Center |
| June 3, 2023 | Kobe | Japan | World Memorial Hall |
| June 4, 2023 | Kobe | Japan | World Memorial Hall |
| June 8, 2023 | Fukuoka | Japan | Fukuoka Sunpalace |
| June 10, 2023 | Taipei | Taiwan | Taipei Music Center |
| June 23, 2023 | Macau | China | Broadway Theatre |
| June 24, 2023 | Macau | China | Broadway Theatre |
| June 26, 2023 | Gifu | Japan | Nagaragawa Convention Center |
| June 28, 2023 | Hiroshima | Japan | Hiroshima City Cultural Exchange Hall |
| July 1, 2023 | Saitama | Japan | Saitama Super Arena |
| July 2, 2023 | Saitama | Japan | Saitama Super Arena |
| July 15, 2023 | Manila | Philippines | Smart Araneta Coliseum |
| July 20, 2023 | Singapore | | The Star Theatre |
| July 29, 2023 | Jakarta | Indonesia | Beach City International Stadium |
| August 5, 2023 | Bangkok | Thailand | Thunder Dome |
| August 6, 2023 | Bangkok | Thailand | Thunder Dome |
| December 1, 2023 | Seoul | South Korea | KSPO Dome |
| December 2, 2023 | Seoul | South Korea | KSPO Dome |
| December 3, 2023 | Seoul | South Korea | KSPO Dome |
| February 3, 2024 | Yokohama | Japan | Pia Arena MM |
| February 4, 2024 | Yokohama | Japan | Pia Arena MM |
Total

==== The Boyz 3rd Zeneration II World Tour ====
| Date | City | Country | Venue |
Asia
| July 12, 2024 | Seoul | South Korea | KSPO Dome |
| July 13, 2024 | Seoul | South Korea | KSPO Dome |
| July 14, 2024 | Seoul | South Korea | KSPO Dome |
North America
| July 19, 2024 | New York City | United States | Radio City Music Hall |
| July 21, 2024 | Atlanta | United States | Fox Theatre |
| July 23, 2024 | Dallas | United States | Music Hall at Fair Park |
| July 25, 2024 | Los Angeles | United States | Peacock Theater |
| July 28, 2024 | San Jose | United States | San Jose Civic |
Asia
| August 10, 2024 | Yokohama | Japan | Pia Arena MM |
| August 11, 2024 | Yokohama | Japan | Pia Arena MM |
| August 17, 2024 | Bangkok | Thailand | UOB Live |
| August 18, 2024 | Bangkok | Thailand | UOB Live |
| August 24, 2024 | Jakarta | Indonesia | Tennis Indoor Senayan |
| August 25, 2024 | Manila | Philippines | SM Mall of Asia Arena |
| August 31, 2024 | Macau | China | Macau Studio City Event Center |
| September 1, 2024 | Macau | China | Macau Studio City Event Center |
| September 7, 2024 | Kuala Lumpur | Malaysia | Mega Star Arena |
Europe
| September 13, 2024 | Paris | France | Dôme de Paris |
| September 15, 2024 | London | United Kingdom | OVO Arena Wembley |
Asia
| September 22, 2024 | Osaka | Japan | Osaka-jō Hall |
| September 23, 2024 | Osaka | Japan | Osaka-jō Hall |

==== The Boyz 4th The Blaze World Tour ====
| Date | City | Country | Venue |
Asia
| August 8, 2025 | Seoul | South Korea | KSPO Dome |
| August 9, 2025 | Seoul | South Korea | KSPO Dome |
| August 10, 2025 | Seoul | South Korea | KSPO Dome |
| August 16, 2025 | Nagoya | Japan | Port Messe Nagoya |
| August 17, 2025 | Nagoya | Japan | Port Messe Nagoya |
| August 23, 2025 | Yokohama | Japan | Pia Arena MM |
| August 24, 2025 | Yokohama | Japan | Pia Arena MM |
| August 30, 2025 | Kobe | Japan | World Memorial Hall |
| August 31, 2025 | Kobe | Japan | World Memorial Hall |
North America
| September 12, 2025 | New York City | United States | The Theater at Madison Square Garden |
| September 14, 2025 | Chicago | United States | Chicago Theatre |
| September 16, 2025 | Atlanta | United States | Center Stage |
| September 21, 2025 | Los Angeles | United States | Orpheum Theatre |
| September 24, 2025 | Tacoma | United States | Pantages Theater |
| Asia | | United States | |
| October 4, 2025 | Tokyo | Japan | Keio Arena Tokyo |
| October 5, 2025 | Tokyo | Japan | Keio Arena Tokyo |
| November 8, 2025 | Jakarta | Indonesia | ICE BSD Hall 1 |

List of cancelled shows
| Date | City | Country | Venue | Reason |
|---|---|---|---|---|
| September 19, 2025 | Oakland | United States | Paramount Theatre | Cancelled due to 'Unforeseen Circumstances' |
| October 11, 2025 | Macau | China | Macau Studio City Event Center | Cancelled due to 'Unforeseen Circumstances' |
| October 18, 2025 | Kuala Lumpur | Malaysia | Idea Live Arena | Cancelled due to 'Unforeseen Circumstances' |
| October 25, 2025 | Taipei | Taiwan | NTSU Arena | Cancelled due to 'Unforeseen Circumstances' |
| November 1, 2025 | Bangkok | Thailand | Idea Live | Cancelled due to 'Unforeseen Circumstances' |

=== Fan Meetings ===
==== The Boyz Fan-Con Tour The Castle ====
| Date | City | Country | Venue |
Asia
| January 26, 2019 | Seoul | South Korea | Olympic Hall |
| January 27, 2019 | Seoul | South Korea | Olympic Hall |
| June 14, 2019 | Hong Kong | China | KITEC |
| June 16, 2019 | Singapore | | Zepp Big Box |
| June 22, 2019 | Jakarta | Indonesia | Balai Sarbini |
| June 23, 2019 | Bangkok | Thailand | GMM Live House |
| June 29, 2019 | Taipei | Taiwan | Taipei International Convention Center |
| June 30, 2019 | Manila | Philippines | New Frontier Theater |

==== The Boyz Europe Tour "Dreamlike" ====
| Date | City | Country | Venue |
Europe
| December 11, 2019 | Berlin | Germany | Astra Kulturhaus |
| December 15, 2019 | Paris | France | Le Bataclan |
| December 18, 2019 | London | United Kingdom | O2 Forum Kentish Town |
| December 20, 2019 | Amsterdam | Netherlands | Melkweg Max |
Total

=== Concert Participation ===
| Event | Date | City | Country | Venue |
|---|---|---|---|---|
| KCON | April 15, 2018 | Chiba | Japan | Makuhari Messe |
| KCON | September 30, 2018 | Bangkok | Thailand | Impact Arena |
| KCON | September 28, 2019 | Bangkok | Thailand | Impact Arena |
| KCON | August 21, 2022 | Los Angeles | United States | Crypto.com Arena |
| KCON | September 30, 2022 | Riyadh | Saudi Arabia | Boulevard City |
| Music Bank World Tour | November 12, 2022 | Santiago | Chile | Estadio Monumental |
| Music Bank World Tour | April 8, 2023 | Paris | France | La Défense Arena |
| K-Verse | April 11, 2023 | Manila | Philippines | Araneta Coliseum |
| Seoul Festa | April 30, 2023 | Seoul | South Korea | Olympic Hall |
| KCON | May 12, 2023 | Chiba | Japan | Makuhari Messe |
| KCON | August 20, 2023 | Los Angeles | United States | Crypto.com Arena |
| KPOP Nation 2023 | September 23, 2023 | Warsaw | Poland | PGE Narodowy |
| WILD KPOP FEST | October 14, 2023 | Sydney | Australia | Qudos Bank Arena |
| Music Bank World Festival | December 9, 2023 | Saitama | Japan | Belluna Dome |
| Seoul Festa | May 1, 2024 | Seoul | South Korea | Seoul Plaza |
| KWAVE Music Festival | May 11, 2024 | Manila | Philippines | Rizal Park |
| KCON | September 28, 2024 | Frankfurt | Germany | Messe Frankfurt |
