= Chase (The Boyz EP) =

- Digital cover

EP by The Boyz
- Released: September 21, 2020
- Recorded: 2020
- Language: Korean
- Labels: Cre.ker Entertainment; Kakao M

The Boyz chronology
Reveal (2020)	Chase (2020)	Breaking Dawn (2021)

Singles from Chase
- 1. "The Stealer" Released: September 21, 2020

Chase is the fifth extended play (EP) by South Korean boy group The Boyz. It was released on September 21, 2020 under Cre.ker Entertainment. It is available in three versions and contains six tracks, with "The Stealer" released as the lead single.

Notable songwriters such as Andreas Öberg, Daniel "Obi" Klein, Charli Taft, and SM Entertainment songwriters and producers Kenzie, Jo Yoon-kyung, and Coach & Sendo contributed to the EP.

== Background ==
The group's first comeback since winning Road to Kingdom was confirmed on August 17.

The comeback date was announced on September 7, along with teaser posters featuring the members. A promotional video titled "Breaking News" was released on September 9. The first batch of concept photos were released on September 10. A second batch of concept photos was released on September 12. The album's track list was released on September 13. On September 14, a second promotional video titled "The Stealers' Tricks" was released. A third batch of concept photos was released on September 15. The album's highlight medley was released on September 16.

A teaser for the music video was released on September 18, with the full music video released on September 21.

== Track listing ==
Credits adapted from Naver.

Chase
No.	Title	Lyrics	Music	Arrangement	Length
1.	"Shine Shine"	Kenzie	Kenzie; Daniel "Obi" Klein; Charli Taft	Kenzie; Daniel "Obi" Klein; Charli Taft	3:35
2.	"The Stealer"	Kenzie; Sunwoo (The Boyz)	Coach & Sendo; Theo Lawrence; Yuki	Coach & Sendo	3:30
3.	"Insanity"	JQ (제이큐); Lee Yeon-ji (Makeumine Works); Yoon (Makeumine Works)	Andy Love; Cozyface (Oceancave)	Cozyface (Oceancave)	3:52
4.	"Whiplash"	Jo Yoon-kyung	Andreas Oberg; Ninos Hanna; Niklas Jarelius Persson; Martin Heneby	Niklas Jarelius Persson; Martin Heneby	3:21
5.	"Make or Break"	Sunwoo (The Boyz); Hwang Yoo-bin	BXN; Yoonseok (윤석)	BXN	3:25
6.	"Checkmate (Stage Ver.)"	Jo Yoon-kyung; Sunwoo (The Boyz)	Imazine; Nathan (네이슨); Andreas Öhrn	Imazine; Nathan (네이슨)	3:31
Total length:					21:18

== Charts ==
=== Weekly charts ===
Chart	Peak position
Japanese Albums (Oricon)	21
South Korean Albums (Gaon)	2
Singaporean Top Korean Albums (KKBox)	26
Japanese Albums Weekly (KKBox)	45

=== Sales and streaming chart performance for songs in "The Stealer" ===
"The Stealer" weekly charts
Chart (2020)	Peak position
Singaporean Top Korean Singles (KKBox)	30
South Korean Digital Chart (Gaon)	46

== Certifications ==
Certifications for Chase
Region	Certification	Certified units/sales
South Korea (KMCA)	Platinum	250,000^{^}
^{^} Shipments figures based on certification alone.

== Accolades ==
Music program awards
Song	Program	Date
"The Stealer"	Show Champion	September 30, 2020
"The Stealer"	M Countdown	October 1, 2020
"The Stealer"	M Countdown	October 8, 2020
"The Stealer"	The Show	October 6, 2020

Year-end lists
Critic/Publication	List	Work	Rank	Ref.
Dazed	The 40 Best K-pop Songs of 2020	"The Stealer"	35	
BuzzFeed	35 Songs That Helped Define K-Pop In 2020	"The Stealer"	31	

== Release history ==
Region	Date	Format	Label
Various	September 21, 2020	Digital download; streaming	Cre.ker Entertainment; Kakao M
Various	September 22, 2020	CD	Cre.ker Entertainment; Kakao M
