= 2020 in South Korean music =

The following is a list of notable events and releases that happened, or were expected to happen in 2020 in music in South Korea.

== Debuting and disbanding in 2020 ==
=== Debuting groups ===
- Aespa
- BAE173
- Blackswan
- B.O.Y
- Botopass
- BtoB 4U
- Cignature
- Cravity
- DKB
- Drippin
- E'Last
- Enhypen
- Ghost9
- H&D
- Lucy
- Lunarsolar
- MCND
- P1Harmony
- Redsquare
- Red Velvet - Irene & Seulgi
- Refund Sisters
- Secret Number
- SSAK3
- STAYC
- Super Five
- TO1
- Treasure
- UNVS
- Weeekly
- WEi
- Woo!ah!
- WJSN Chocome

=== Solo debuts ===
- Bang Ye-dam
- from20
- Han Seung-woo
- D.Ark
- Heo Chan-mi
- Kai
- Ken
- Kim Nam-joo
- Kim Woo-seok
- Lee Eun-sang
- Lee Su-hyun
- Max
- Moon Jong-up
- Natty
- Ong Seong-wu
- Ryu Su-jeong
- Seo Eun-kwang
- Serri
- Solar
- Suho
- Wonho
- YooA
- Yook Sung-jae
- Yoon Doo-joon

=== Disbandments ===
- 1the9
- 5urprise
- A Train To Autumn
- Badkiz
- Gugudan
- H&D
- Hinapia
- Masc
- NeonPunch
- Purple Rain
- Spectrum
- SSAK3
- X1

== Releases in 2020 ==
=== First quarter ===
==== January ====
Date	Album	Artist(s)	Genre(s)	Ref.
2	Countdown	TST	Dance	
6	Treasure Epilogue: Action to Answer	Ateez	EDM	
6	Unstable Mindset	Younha	Ballad, Rock	
6	U N U Part. 1	Nafla	R&B, hip hop	
7	Face Me	Verivery	Dance	
7	First Collection	SF9	Dance	
7	Phase One: You	B.O.Y	R&B	
8	Dream Wish	DreamNote	Dance, Bubblegum	
12	Red In The Apple	ENOi	Dance	
14	Ayo	Kim Jae-joong	Ballad, Rock	
14	We Tuzi	2Z	Crunk	
15	Purpose (Repackage)	Taeyeon	Ballad, R&B	
16	Woman of 9.9 Billion OST	Various artists	OST, Ballad	
18	K.I.S.S	twlv	R&B, hip hop	
19	Chocolate OST	Various artists	OST, Ballad	
21	...Ler	Kim Dong-wan	Ballad	
22	Obscured Star	Han Dong-geun	Ballad	
28	All For You	Sechs Kies	Dance, R&B	
28	Timeless	Super Junior	Hip hop, Dance	
29	Without You	Golden Child	Dance, Ballad	
29	From h	Lee Hae-ri	Ballad	
30	Through Love	Hyukoh	Indie rock	
30	Monthly Project 2019 Yoon Jong-shin	Yoon Jong-shin	Ballad, R&B	
31	The:IZ	IZ	Pop rock	

==== February ====
Date	Album	Artist(s)	Genre(s)	Ref.
3	回:Labyrinth	GFriend	Dance, Ballad	
3	Reminiscence	Everglow	Dance	
3	Youth	DKB	Dance, Hip hop	
5	[#]	Loona	Dance-pop, R&B	
6	I Decide	iKon	Dance, Hip hop	
10	Reveal	The Boyz	Dance, Ballad	
10	Red Punch	Rocket Punch	Dance, Ballad	
12	Universe: The Black Hall	Pentagon	Dance-pop, Electronic	
12	Red Moon	Kard	EDM, Hip hop	
13	5nally	AB6IX	R&B, Hip hop	
14	Dark Side of the Moon	Moonbyul	Dance, R&B	
17	Bloom*Iz	Iz*One	Dance, Ballad	
18	Dystopia: The Tree of Language	Dreamcatcher	Rock, Dance	
18	Nonadaptation	Se So Neon	Indie rock	
21	Map of the Soul: 7	BTS	Hip hop, Dance	
23	Timeless	UNVS	Dance, R&B	
23	One & Only^{1}	Astro	Dance	
24	0325	Spectrum	Dance	
24	El Dorado	Ravi	Hip hop, Pop rock	
26	Jackpot	Elris	Dance	
27	Into the Ice Age	MCND	Hip hop, Dance	

==== March ====
Date	Album	Artist(s)	Genre(s)	Ref.
2	Yook O'Clock	Yook Sung-jae	Ballad, Dance-pop, R&B	
3	Is Anybody Out There?	DPR Live	Hip hop, R&B	
4	Upgrade IV	Swings	Hip hop	
6	Neo Zone	NCT 127	Dance-pop, Hip hop	
9	It'z Me	Itzy	Dance-pop, Hip hop	
9	Continuous	Victon	Pop, R&B	
17	Plant	Kim Se-jeong	Ballad	
20	Itaewon Class OST	Various artists	OST, Rock, Ballad	
24	Cyan	Kang Daniel	R&B	
24	In Its Time	Oneus	Dance	
24	U N U Part. 2	Nafla	R&B, hip hop	
25	Layers	Ong Seong-wu	Dance, R&B	
25	Fade Away	Song I-han	R&B	
27	Once and for All	Bursters	Metalcore	
30	Self-Portrait	Suho	Alternative rock, Ballad	
30	Thunderbird Motel	Zior Park	Hip hop	
31	When I Tell You Goodbye	Hynn	Ballad	

=== Second quarter ===
==== April ====
Date	Album	Artist(s)	Genre(s)	Ref.
1	Reason For Being: Benevolence	TOO	Dance	
2	People	Code Kunst	Hip hop	
6	Chocolate	Max	Dance, R&B	
6	I Trust	(G)I-dle	Dance, Hip hop	
7	Stella I	Stella Jang	Indie folk	
8	My Personas	Shin Seung-hun	Ballad	
9	Remember	Winner	R&B, Ballad	
13	Look	Apink	Synth-pop, Ballad	
13	Founder	Deepflow	Korean hip hop	
14	Season 1. Hideout: Remember Who We Are	Cravity	Urban hip hop, Dance	
17	Beige 0.5	Kid Milli	Hip hop	
18	Day2Day	Zelo	Hip hop	
20	Dye	Got7	Hip hop, R&B	
21	Soulmate	H&D	Dance, R&B	
22	Da Capo	April	Synth-pop, Dance	
22	Heart, Two	Paul Kim	R&B	
22	Spring to Spring	Hoppipolla	Ballad	
23	1719	Ha:tfelt	R&B	
23	Spit It Out^{1}	Solar	Dance	
26	Off the Record	Ben	Ballad, R&B	
27	Up The Sky: 飛	Noir	Pop, Dance	
27	Nonstop	Oh My Girl	Dance, Ballad	
28	The Keys	GWSN	Dance	
28	L.L	Imfact	Dance, Ballad	
29	Reload	NCT Dream	Urban, Trap, R&B	

==== May ====
Date	Album	Artist(s)	Genre(s)	Ref.
4	Plus Two	Fanatics	Dance, Ballad	
4	Gateway	Astro	Pop, R&B	
7	Headache^{1}	Moon Jong-up	Dance	
7	Nineteen^{1}	Natty	Dance-pop	
8	X	PH-1	Hip hop	
11	The Nocturne	NU'EST	Pop, R&B	
11	The Book of Us: The Demon	Day6	Pop rock	
13	Puberty Book II Pum	Bolbbalgan4	Indie pop	
13	Carnival	Bvndit	Dance	
13	Reminiscence of Love	WoongSan	Jazz	
13	Paeonia	Busters	Dance	
13	Welcome OST	Various artists	OST, Ballad	
15	Exclamation	Woo!ah!	Dance	
18	The Dream Chapter: Eternity	TXT	Dance, R&B	
18	I Can't Tell You Everything	Cheeze	R&B, Indie pop	
19	Neo Zone: The Final Round	NCT 127	Dance, Hip hop	
19	Prequel	Redsquare	Dance	
19	Who Dis?	Secret Number	Dance	
20	Greeting	Ken	Korean ballad	
20	Tiger Eyes	Ryu Su-jeong	Dance, Ballad	
21	Produced By [ ] Part 1	OnlyOneOf	Pop	
22	D-2	Agust D	Rap	
25	1st Desire [Greed]	Kim Woo-seok	Pop	
25	Delight	Baekhyun	R&B	
25	Love	DKB	Dance	
25	The World of the Married OST	Various artists	OST, Ballad	
26	Fantasia X	Monsta X	Dance, Hip hop	
26	The W	Park Ji-hoon	Dance	
26	One	Onewe	Dance, Pop rock	
29	Moon: Repackage	Moonbyul	Dance, R&B	

==== June ====
Date	Album	Artist(s)	Genre(s)	Ref.
1	More & More	Twice	Pop, Dance	
2	Mayday	Victon	R&B, Pop	
4	Hospital Playlist OST	Various artists	OST, Ballad	
5	Where Your Eyes Linger OST	Various artists	OST, Ballad	
8	When We Were Us	Super Junior-K.R.Y.	Ballad	
8	Twilight Zone	Ha Sung-woon	Pop, Dance	
8	FoRest: Entrance	Seo Eun-kwang	Ballad	
9	Neverland	Cosmic Girls	Synthpop, Dance	
9	Day Dream	E'Last	Pop, Ballad	
10	Flower 4 Seasons	DIA	Ballad	
10	So, 通	N.Flying	Pop-rock	
10	Lyricist	Heize	R&B	
11	Starry Night	Momoland	Dance	
12	The King: Eternal Monarch OST	Various artist	OST, Ballad	
15	Oneiric Diary	Iz*One	Dance, Synthpop	
15	Anbu	Lee Sun-hee	Ballad	
17	Go Live	Stray Kids	Hip hop, Dance	
17	Draw You: Remember Me	D1ce	Pop, Ballad	
17	Nature World: Code M	Nature	Electropop	
18	Hide and Seek	Weki Meki	Dance	
19	432	Bandage	Rock	
22	Heng:garæ	Seventeen	Dance	
23	Take a Leap	Golden Child	Dance, R&B	
23	Op.01	Purple Rain	Rock	
26	How You Like That^{1}	Blackpink	Hip hop	
27	Headliner (Deluxe)	Sik-K	Hip hop	
29	Vivid	AB6IX	Hip hop, Dance	
29	Equal	Woodz	Pop	
29	Triangle	3YE	Hip hop, Electronic	
29	María	Hwasa	R&B, Pop	
29	Mystic Pop-up Bar OST	Various artists	OST, Ballad	
30	Splash!	Lee Jin-hyuk	Dance	
30	We Are	Weeekly	Dance	

=== Third quarter ===
==== July ====
Date	Album	Artist(s)	Genre(s)	Ref.
1	Face You	Verivery	Dance	
1	Random Box	Zico	Hip hop	
1	Dear	Shin Yong-jae	R&B	
3	Hola!	Jaurim	Rock	
4	Dinner Mate OST	Various artists	OST, Ballad	
6	Monster	Red Velvet - Irene & Seulgi	R&B, Pop	
6	9loryus	SF9	Dance	
6	Play^{1}	Chungha	Latin pop, Dance	
7	Y.O.U^{1}	Dongkiz I:Kan	New jack swing, Dance	
8	We're Not Alone Chapter 2: You & Me	GreatGuys	Dance	
9	Boy to Man	Vinxen	Hip hop	
13	回:Song of the Sirens	GFriend	Dance, Pop rock	
13	1 Billion Views	Exo-SC	Hip hop, R&B	
14	24 Part 1	Jeong Se-woon	R&B, Pop rock	
14	Shadow Play^{1}	Pink Fantasy	Moombahton, Trap	
15	Running Toogether	TOO	Dance-pop	
15	Simple	Jung Eun-ji	Pop rock, Ballad	
16	Turn Over	1the9	Dance	
17	Summer Night Story	Mind U	Indie folk	
17	Let Me Rise Again	MustB	Hip hop, Dance	
18	Beach Again^{1}	SSAK3	Dance-pop, Retro	
21	Soul Lady	Yukika	Retro, Ballad	
21	My Unfamiliar Family OST	Various artists	OST, Ballad	
24	Still a Child	Rooftop Moonlight	Indie folk, Ballad	
26	Dream	Song Ji-eun	R&B, Ballad	
27	Daybreak	Yoon Doo-joon	R&B	
28	Paradise	Ravi	Dance, Hip-hop	
29	Zero: Fever Part.1	Ateez	Dance, EDM	
29	Hello Summer	April	Dance	
30	The Other Side	Eric Nam	Pop	
30	Nuna	Jessi	Hip-hop	
31	Don't Wait^{1}	S.I.S	R&B	
31	Kingmaker: The Change of Destiny OST	Various artists	OST, Ballad	

==== August ====
Date	Album	Artist(s)	Genre(s)	Ref.
3	Magenta	Kang Daniel	Dance	
3	Dumdi Dumdi^{1}	(G)I-dle	Dance, Tropical	
3	D.B.D.B.Dib	Saturday	Dance	
4	Blue Punch	Rocket Punch	Dance, Electropop	
5	My Little Thought	Sandeul	Ballad	
5	Good Bye 1the9	1the9	Dance	
6	W.A.Y	ENOi	Dance	
7	The First Step: Chapter One	Treasure	Electropop	
8	Backstreet Rookie OST	Various artists	OST, Ballad	
9	It's Okay to Not Be Okay OST	Various artists	OST, Ballad	
10	Spin Off	ONF	Dance	
10	Fame	Han Seung-woo	R&B, Pop	
10	All My Love^{1}	Park Bo-gum	Ballad	
11	Antiformal	twlv	R&B, hip hop	
13	Panorama	Lucy	Pop-rock, R&B	
14	Good Boy	Zai.ro	R&B	
17	Dystopia: Lose Myself	Dreamcatcher	Rock, Moombahton	
17	Water	G2	Hip hop	
17	Not Shy	Itzy	Dance, Electropop	
18	Loop	Peakboy	R&B, hip hop	
18	Black Out	Woo Won-jae	Korean hip hop	
19	Lived	Oneus	Pop rock, Electronic	
19	Say My Name	Hyolyn	Dance, R&B	
19	Ego	Dongkiz	Trap	
20	Earth Age	MCND	Dance	
24	Season 2. Hideout: The New Day We Step Into	Cravity	EDM, Hip hop	
26	Way with Words	Kard	Dance, Hip hop	
26	Wanderer Fantasy	Purple Rain	Rock	
26	Flamingo^{1}	Botopass	Latin pop, Reggaeton	
27	Produced by [ ] Part 2	OnlyOneOf	Dance-pop	
27	Marigold Tapes	E Sens	Korean hip hop	
31	The Book of Us: Gluon	Even of Day	Pop rock, Synth-pop	
31	Beautiful Scar	Lee Eun-sang	R&B, Hip hop	

==== September ====
Date	Album	Artist(s)	Genre(s)	Ref.
1	Unforgettable	Lovelyz	Dance	
1	The World is Like a Handkerchief	Autumn Vacation	Korean indie	
2	HZJM: The Butterfly Phantasy	A.C.E	EDM, Hip hop	
2	Solar: flare^{1}	Lunarsolar	Dance, Moombahton	
2	Helicopter^{1}	CLC	Trap, EDM	
2	Was It Love? OST	Various artists	OST, Ballad	
2	H1ghr: Red Tape	H1ghr Music	Hip hop	
3	Bad Blood	Super Junior-D&E	Electronic, R&B	
3	Let Me Dive Into This Moment	Luli Lee	Indie rock	
4	Love Synonym Pt.1: Right for Me	Wonho	Pop, R&B	
5	We Are Family	Kim Ho-joong	Trot	
7	Never Gonna Dance Again: Act 1	Taemin	Dance, R&B	
7	Bird^{1}	Kim Nam-joo	Trap	
7	Bon Voyage	YooA	Dance, Electropop	
7	He (Don't Wanna Be Alone)	Jang Woo-hyuk	R&B, Hip hop	
14	In Life	Stray Kids	Hip hop, Dance	
14	In-Out	Moonbin & Sanha	Dance, Funk	
14	Heaven	Kim Sa-wol	Indie folk	
15	Made For Two	VAV	Dance	
15	Phase Two: We	B.O.Y	Dance, Electronic	
15	Life Train	Na Tae-joo	Trot	
16	My Little Society	Fromis 9	Dance, Synthpop	
16	H1ghr: Blue Tape	H1ghr Music	Hip hop	
17	KNK Airline	KNK	Dance	
18	The First Step: Chapter Two	Treasure	EDM	
21	Chase	The Boyz	Dance, Electropop	
21	−77.82X−78.29	Everglow	Synthpop	
22	Listen and Speak	Cignature	Electropop	
23	The Intersection: Belief	BDC	Synthpop	
23	Umbrella	H&D	R&B, Hip hop	
23	Pre Episode 1: Door	Ghost9	Dance-pop, Hip hop	
24	Light Up	UP10TION	Electronic	
24	Ddalala	XUM	New Jersey sound	
25	Super One	SuperM	Dance, Pop rap	
26	Mister T Vol.1	Mister T	Trot, EDM	
28	Candy Pianist	Lee Jin-ah	R&B	
28	Bad Liar	Super Junior-D&E	EDM, Hip hop	
28	Love-Hate	Kim Hyo-eun	Korean hip hop	
30	1Q87	Nucksal	Hip hop	
30	Kim Dong-ryul Live 2019 Song of Old	Kim Dong-ryul	Korean ballad	

=== Fourth quarter ===
==== October ====
Date	Album	Artist(s)	Genre(s)	Ref.
2	The Album	Blackpink	EDM, Trap	
4	Like a Film	Giriboy	Korean hip hop	
5	Identity: First Sight	WEi	Dance	
5	Special History Book	SF9	Future bass, Ballad	
6	0	Mad Clown	Ballad	
6	I'm	Ailee	Ballad, R&B	
7	Pump It Up	Golden Child	Synthpop, Dance	
7	Hmph!	WJSN Chocome	Disco, Moombahton	
8	New Rules	Weki Meki	Electropop	
8	Silence	Oohyo	Synth-pop, Indie pop	
9	Dawndididawn	Dawn	Hip hop	
9	Psyche	Joohoney	Hip hop	
12	NCT 2020 Resonance Pt. 1	NCT	Electronic, Pop rap	
12	We:th	Pentagon	Pop rock, Dance	
13	We Can	Weeekly	Electropop, Dance	
13	Face Us	Verivery	Dance	
15	Studio We : Recording	Onewe	Alternative rock	
16	Goodbye Rania	Black Swan	Dance	
16	Dark Adaptation	Jo Gwang-il	Korean hip hop	
18	Door	Kim Chang-wan	Folk	
19	12:00	Loona	Electropop	
19	Love Should Not Be Harsh on You	Im Chang-jung	Korean ballad	
19	Origine	B1A4	Dance	
19	; [Semicolon]	Seventeen	Dance, Funk	
19	A Bell of Blessing	Kim Hyun-joong	Pop rock	
20	With Her	Crush	Ballad, R&B	
20	Across the Universe	D-Crunch	Trap, Pop	
21	Decoherence	AleXa	EDM	
22	Bloom	Song Ji-eun	Ballad	
26	Minisode1: Blue Hour	TXT	Synthpop	
26	Eyes Wide Open	Twice	Synthpop, Dance	
26	Growth	DKB	Dance, Trap	
26	Memories of Autumn	Kassy	Ballad, R&B	
26	Record of Youth OST	Various artists	OST, Ballad	
27	Hello Chapter 3: Hello, Strange Time	CIX	Dance-pop	
27	SOS	Romantic Punch	Punk rock, Indie rock	
28	Disharmony: Stand Out	P1Harmony	Hip hop, EDM	
28	Boyager	Drippin	Dance-pop, R&B	
28	Jasmin	JBJ95	Disco, R&B	
30	Take	Mino	Hip hop, R&B	

==== November ====
Date	Album	Artist(s)	Genre(s)	Ref.
2	Fatal Love	Monsta X	Hip hop, EDM	
2	Salute	AB6IX	Hip hop, R&B	
3	Travel	Mamamoo	Dance-pop	
4	Message	Park Ji-hoon	Hip hop, R&B	
4	Filmlet	Bolbbalgan4	Disco, Indie rock	
4	Got That Boom	Secret Number	Dance-pop	
5	She	Jang Woo-hyuk	EDM	
6	All Out	K/DA	Pop	
6	The First Step: Chapter Three	Treasure	Hip hop	
6	Jannabi's Small Pieces I	Jannabi	Indie rock	
9	回: Walpurgis Night	GFriend	Disco, Pop	
9	Mirage	Ha Sung-woon	Dance-pop, Ballad	
9	Never Gonna Dance Again: Act 2	Taemin	Dance-pop, Electropop	
10	Pit a Pat	Xia	House, Ballad	
10	18 Again OST	Various artists	OST, Ballad	
11	Awake	E'Last	Pop rap	
11	Trace	Lee Juck	Folk	
12	Star to a Young Culture	STAYC	Dance	
12	Snooze	Lucy	Rock	
12	2006	Jukjae	Folk	
16	Inside	BtoB 4U	Electropop	
16	Love So Sweet	Park Jung-min	Ballad	
17	Woops!	Woodz	Dance-pop, Hip hop	
17	Re-code	CNBLUE	Pop rock	
17	Ready or Not	Momoland	Teen pop, R&B	
18	Journey	Henry Lau	R&B	
18	The Quest for Anxiety	Jang Jae-in	Alternative rock	
19	Intersection: Spark	BAE173	R&B, Dance-pop	
20	Be	BTS	R&B, Hip hop	
23	NCT 2020 Resonance Pt. 2	NCT	Hip hop, Dance	
24	Qurious	Woo!ah!	Dance-pop	
24	My Dangerous Wife OST	Various artists	OST	
25	Ordinary Days	DickPunks	Rock	
28	More Than Friends OST	Various artists	OST	
29	Waltz^{1}	Ahn Ye-eun	Korean ballad	
30	Border: Day One	Enhypen	Pop, Hip hop	
30	Breath of Love: Last Piece	Got7	Dance-pop, Electronic	
30	Kai (开)	Kai	R&B, Dance-pop	

==== December ====
Date	Album	Artist(s)	Genre(s)	Ref.
1	Better	BoA	R&B	
1	Life	Vanner	Dance-pop, Hip hop	
2	Scene#1	La Poem	Crossover, Ballad	
2	Do Do Sol Sol La La Sol OST	Various artists	OST, Ballad	
3	Tale of the Nine Tailed OST	Various artists	OST, Ballad	
4	Our Time is Blue	Katie	R&B	
7	One-reeler / Act IV	Iz*One	Dance-pop	
9	20 Minutes	Jun.K	R&B, Jazz	
9	The Spies Who Loved Me OST	Various artists	OST, Ballad	
10	Tellusboutyourself	Baek Ye-rin	R&B, House	
10	Pre Episode 2: W.all	Ghost9	Dance-pop, Hip hop	
10	The Project	Lee Seung-gi	Korean ballad, Rock	
11	Memory : Illusion	Onewe	Alternative rock	
14	Inside Me	Kim Sung-kyu	Electropop, R&B	
14	Fate Way	Seongri	Trot, Ballad	
15	What Do I Call You	Taeyeon	R&B, Trap	
17	777	Bassagong	Korean hip hop	
26	Dream	Song Ga-in	Trot	
30	Blaze	Rolling Quartz	Rock	
28	Hello	Huh Gak	Korean ballad	

== See also ==
- List of South Korean films of 2020
- List of Gaon Album Chart number ones of 2020
- List of Gaon Digital Chart number ones of 2020

== Notes ==
- ^{1}The following was released as a single but charted on the Gaon Album Chart.
