= MustB =

South Korean boy band

BE:MAX 머스트비
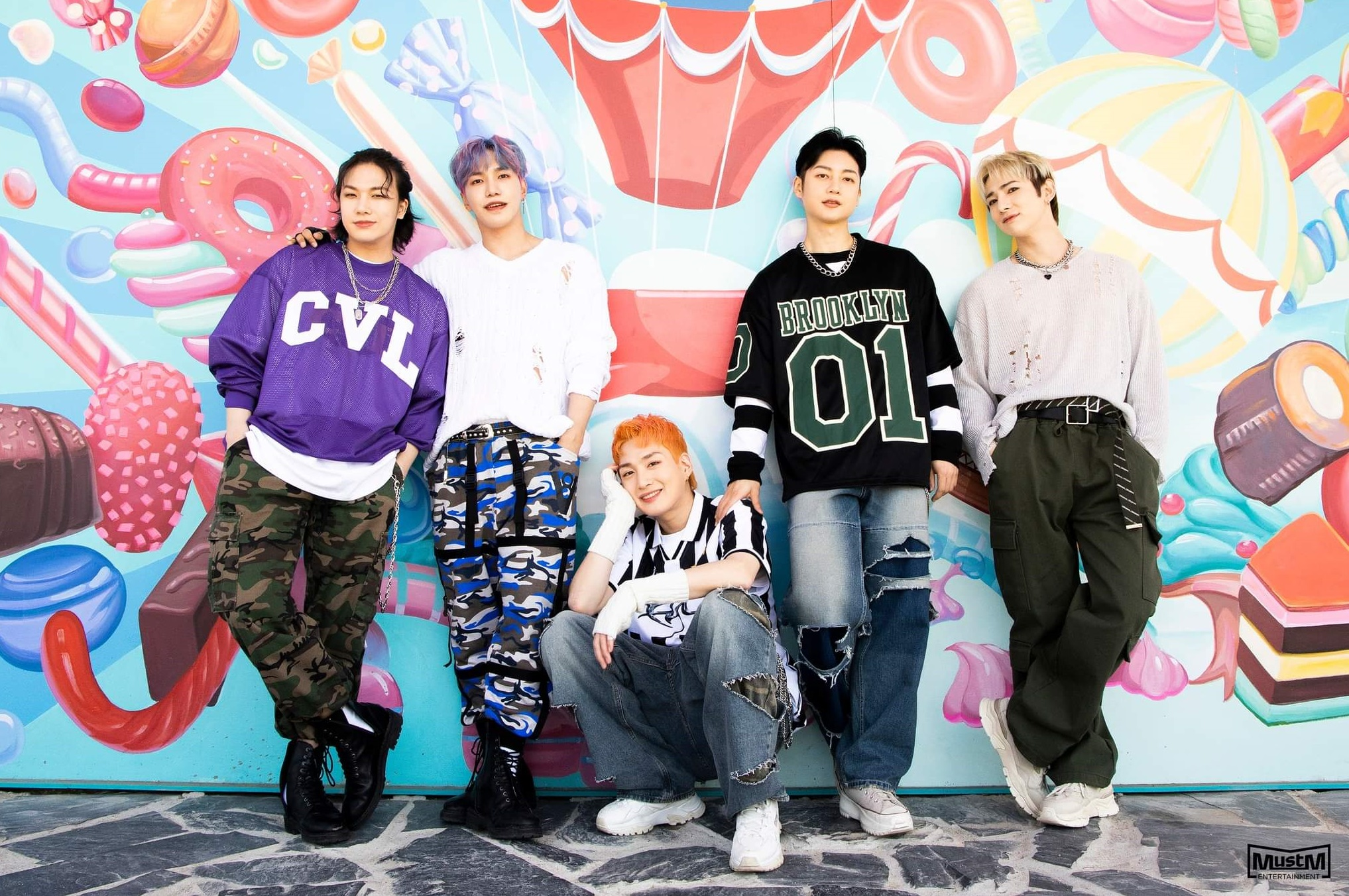

Background information
- Origin: Seoul, South Korea
- Genres: K-pop; hip hop; dance
- Years active: 2019–2023; 2024–present
- Label: MustM Entertainment
- Members: Taegeon; Wooyeon; Doha; Soohyun; Sihoo
- Past members: Hawoon; Sangwoo
- Website: mustbalight.com

Korean name
- Hangul: 머스트비
Transcriptions
- Revised Romanization: Meoseuteubi

Japanese name
- Hiragana: マストビー
Transcriptions
- Kunrei-shiki: Masutobī

Be:Max (Korean: 머스트비; stylized in all caps) is a South Korean boy band group originally formed by MustM Entertainment. The groups contract was terminated in November 2023 with MustM. In January 2024, the band announced they are coming back and restyled their name from MustB to Must.Be. The group is composed of five members: Taegeon, Wooyeon, Doha, Soohyun, and Sihoo. The group debuted on January 21, 2019, with the release of their first single "I Want U".

Must.Be released the mini album Let Me Rise Again in 2020, La Senorita in 2022, and Royalty in 2023.

== History ==
=== Pre-debut ===
Before debuting with MustB, Taegeon was a member of M.Crown from 2015 to 2016 and Challenger from 2017 to 2018. Doha was a member of Underdog from 2014 to 2016, under the name Baekjin. Sihoo is a former 1Million Studio dancer and was a backup dancer in BTS's "Idol". In 2018, MustB recorded their single "I Want U", as well as an accompanying music video with former member Chibin. A few months later, Chibin departed the company and was replaced by Soohyun.

=== 2019–2021: Debut with I Want U and Let Me Rise Again ===
MustB announced their debut showcase on January 21, 2019, held at the S-Plex Center in Sangam-dong as a seven-member group. On January 30, MustB released their first single album I Want U. On April 21, 2019, MustB was involved in a car accident. Following the incident, Hawoon and Sangwoo both left the group.

On July 17, 2020, MustB released their first EP Let Me Rise Again, with their title song "Realize".

MustB were appointed as ambassador for School Violence Prevention in April 2021.

On December 24, 2021, the song "Finding the Hidden You", a collaboration of members Taegeon and Wooyeon, along with Pink Fantasy member, SeeA, was released. This release is part of a project created by K-Stage, a concert-like event produced by music distributor and music artist management company, Naturally Music.

=== 2022–present: La Señorita, Royalty and Rush ===
On August 11, 2022, MustB was appointed as an Honorary Ambassador for the United Nations Volunteers Korea.

On September 19, 2022, MustB released their second single album, La Señorita. On September 30, 2022, MustB were joined on stage by Mexican band Grupo Control during their stop in South Padre Island, Texas and performed the Tao Tao after going viral on TikTok recreating the Tao Tao dance. Grupo Control also collaborated with MustB to create a Spanish version of "La Señorita".

On April 17, 2023, MustB released their third single album, Royalty, with their title song of the same name, and the second single from the album, "Memory". MustB was made Public Relations Ambassador for the National Committee of the King Sejong the Great on May 13, 2023.

To celebrate the 50th anniversary of diplomatic relations between South Korea and India, the Ministry of Culture, Sports and Tourism in collaboration with Korean Cultural Centre India hosted a seminar on Korean culture, including a K-Pop concert featuring MustB, along with Indian singer Neeti Mohan on August 25, 2023. MustB also performed their newest single, "Rush" which was released on August 22, and RRR's Naatu Naatu.

== Musical style ==
MustB's music heavily features light, rhythmical beats, delicate bass lines and sensuous melodies, as they continue experimenting with various genres including hip-hop, EDM, and future house. Their songs focus on the message of spreading love. MustB believe that love is what heals wounded hearts. Because people are scared and feel discomfort in different ways, MustB wants to create music that brings comfort and heals these wounds for people all around the world.

== Members ==
=== Current ===
- Taegeon (태건) – leader, rapper
- Wooyeon (우연) – vocalist
- Doha (도하) – vocalist
- Soohyun (수현) – rapper, dancer
- Sihoo (시후) – vocalist, dancer

=== Former ===
- Sangwoo (상우)
- Hawoon (하운)
- Chibin (치빈)

== Discography ==
=== Extended plays ===
Title	EP details	Peak chart positions	Sales
Title	EP details	KOR	Sales
Let Me Rise Again	Released: July 17, 2020; Label: MustM Entertainment, Quarter Music; Formats: CD, Digital download; Track Listing: 1. "Let Me Rise Again (Intro)"; 2. "Realize"; 3. "Veil"; 4. "Love Formula"; 5. "Just Say It"; 6. "Diamond"; 7. "Time's Up"; 8. " I Want U"; 9. "Shed A Light"	72	—N/a

=== Single albums ===
Title	Album details	Peak chart positions	Sales
Title	Album details	KOR	Sales
I Want U	Released: January 30, 2019; Label: MustM Entertainment, Quarter Music; Formats: CD, Digital download; Track Listing: 1. "I Want U"; 2. "Time's Up"	—	—N/a
La Señorita	Released: September 19, 2022; Label: MustM Entertainment, Quarter Music; Formats: CD, Digital download; Track Listing: 1. "La Señorita"; 2. "All Day"; 3. "La Señorita (Backing Track)"; 4. "All Day (Backing Track)"	—	—N/a
Royalty	Released: April 17, 2023; Label: MustM Entertainment, Quarter Music; Formats: CD, Digital download; Track Listing: 1. "Royalty"; 2. "Memory"; 3. "Royalty (Instrumental)"; 4. "Memory (Instrumental)"	94	KOR: 1,191

=== Singles ===
Title	Year	Album
MustB
"I Want U"	2019	I Want U
"Realize"	2020	Let Me Rise Again
"Love Formula"	2020	Let Me Rise Again
"Diamond"	2020	Let Me Rise Again
"La Señorita" (라 세뇨리타)	2022	La Señorita
"All Day"	2022	La Señorita
"Spring Again"	2022	Spring Again
"Muffin Christmas"	2022	Muffin Christmas
"Persona"	2023	Persona
"Royalty"	2023	Royalty
"Memory"	2023	Royalty
"Rush"	2023	Rush
Be:Max
"Down Down"	2025	Non-album singles

=== Collaborations ===
Title	Year	Artists	Project	Ref
"Finding the Hidden You" (숨은 그대 찾기)	2021	Taegeon, Wooyeon, SeeA (Pink Fantasy)	KStage x MustB x Pink Fantasy	
"Tonight (So Sweet 오늘밤 그대는)"	2022	Wooyeon	KStage x MustB	
"La Señorita"	2023	Grupo Control feat. MustB	Grupo Control x MustB	

=== Soundtrack appearances ===
Title	Year	Artists	Movies/Series	Ref
"Love Seeps In"	2023	Taegeon, Yoon Song-ah	Diamond Hotel	

== Concerts and tours ==
2019 - 2021
Event	Location	Date	Ref
1st Korea-Romania Industry Expo	Bucharest, Romania	September 4–5, 2019	
2019 Year End K-Pop Concert	Almaty, Kazakhstan	December 18, 2019	
2019 Year End K-Pop Concert	Nur-Sultan, Kazakhstan	December 20, 2019	
Let's Get It	Osaka, Japan	October 25, 2020	
Camping Con	Seoul, Korea	May 22, 2021	
Mokpo Literary Expo	Jeollanam-do, South Korea	October 9, 2021	
Korean Festival	Houston, TX USA	October 23, 2021	
LX Picnic Concert	South Korea	November 4, 2021	
Live in PR	Puerto Rico, USA	November 12–13, 2021	
KBC Music Award (renamed Golden Seoul Awards)	Seoul, South Korea	December 19, 2021	

2022
Event	Location	Date	Ref
Concert Series Kickoff
Light On	Seoul, South Korea	April 2, 2022	
USA Tour 2022
Lights On in Opelika	Opelika, AL	April 8, 2022	
MustB Cafe	Atlanta, GA	April 9, 2022	
Dolce Session	St. Louis, MO	April 10, 2022	
MustB Fanmeeting	Houston, TX	April 12, 2022	
Pocket Friends USA Tour	Los Angeles, CA USA	April 16–17, 2022	
Unveiled Latin America Tour 2022
Unveiled San Juan	San Juan, Puerto Rico, USA	May 6, 2022	
Unveiled Humacao	Humacao, Puerto Rico, USA	May 7, 2022	
Unveiled Panama	Panama, Panama	May 12, 2022	
Unveiled Orlando	Orlando, FL, USA	May 14, 2022	
Unveiled El Salvador	San Salvador, El Salvador	May 23, 2022	
Unveiled Merida	Merida, Yucatan	May 29, 2022	
WORLD TOUR 2022
We Are MustB	Osaka, Japan	June 15–27, 2022	
Naadam Festival	Naadamn, Mongolia	July 15, 2022	
MustB with Muffins	Bucharest, Romania	July 26, 2022	
Kpop Fiesta Night	Dubai, United Arab Emirates	July 29, 2022	
Live in SPI	South Padro Island, TX USA	September 30- October 1, 2022	
BA Celebra Corea	Buenos Aires, Argentina	November 20, 2022	
K-Wave Festa	Cape Town, South Africa	December 4, 2022	
Laos-Korea Tourism Festival	Vientiane, Laos	December 17, 2022	

2023
Event	Location	Date	Ref
Dinagsa Festival	Cadiz City, Philippines	January 28, 2022	
MustB Japan Live	Osaka, Japan	June 10–11, 2023	
Korean Spotlight @Kazakhstan 2023	Almaty, Kazakhstan	June 23, 2023	
Crazy for K-Culture	New Delhi, India	August 25, 2023	

Dance Workshop
Song	Location	Country	Date	Ref
Realize	Orlando, FL	USA	May 20, 2022	

== Awards and nominations ==
Award	Year	Category	Nominee Name	Results	Ref
1st K-Stage Awards	2021	Pocketdols Star	MustB	Won	
1st K-Stage Awards	2021	Best Friends Award	MustB x VAN EL	Won	
Korean Best Band Award	2022	Hallyu Star Award	MustB	Won	
Pocketdol Awards	2022	Pocketdol Best Artist	MustB	Won	
