= We Play =

- Digital and "Jump" version cover

EP by Weeekly
- Released: March 17, 2021
- Genre: K-pop; reggae-pop
- Length: 16:21
- Language: Korean
- Label: Play M; Kakao

Weeekly chronology
We Can (2020)	We Play (2021)	Play Game: Holiday (2021)

Singles from We Play
- 1. "After School" Released: March 17, 2021

We Play is the third extended play by South Korean girl group Weeekly. It was released on March 17, 2021, by Play M and distributed by Kakao. The physical version of the EP was made available in two versions: "Jump" and "Up". It contains five tracks, including the lead single "After School".

== Background and release ==
On February 24, Play M Entertainment released a teaser photo announcing that Weeekly would make a comeback with their third EP We Play.

On March 3–4, they released the concept photos for We Play. On March 8, they released the concept film for We Play. This concept film also revealed "After School" as the lead single. On March 10, the tracklist for We Play was released. On March 12, the highlight medley for the EP was released. On March 15, they released the music video teaser for "After School".

On March 17, We Play was released along with the music video for "After School".

== Promotion ==
On March 17, 2021, Weeekly held an online showcase from Shinhan Card Fan Square.

== Track listing ==
Credits adapted from Melon.

No.	Title	Lyrics	Music	Arrangement	Length
1.	"Yummy!"	Lee Seu-ran	Sam Klempner; Frankie Day (THE HUB); Chanti (THE HUB); Ayu (THE HUB); Charlotte Wilson (THE HUB); Brian U (THE HUB)	Sam Klempner	3:03
2.	"Lucky"	Jiyoon (Weeekly)	Jiyoon (Weeekly); BlueRhythm	BlueRhythm	3:18
3.	"After School"	Seo Ji-eum; Seo Jeong-ah	Daniel Durn; David Quinones; Denzil Remedios; Katrine Neya Klith Joergensen; Jazelle Paris; Ryan S. Jhun	Denzil Remedios; Ryan S. Jhun	3:25
4.	"Uni"	LUKA (ARTMATIC); Socio Kate; Park Ji-hyeong; DK Arnold	NOMASGOOD; Lee Hyeon-sang (ARTMATIC); XLMT	Lee Hyeon-sang (ARTMATIC); NOMASGOOD; XLMT	3:18
5.	"Butterfly" (나비 동화; nabi donghwa [lit. "Butterfly fairy tale"])	Kim Eana	JeA; AFTERSHOK	AFTERSHOK	3:17
Total length:					16:21

== Charts ==
Weekly sales chart performance for We Play
Chart (2021)	Peak position
South Korean Albums (Gaon)	10

Monthly sales chart performance for We Play
Chart (2021)	Peak position
South Korean Albums (Gaon)	21

== Release history ==
Region	Date	Format	Label
South Korea	March 17, 2021	CD; digital download; streaming	Play M, Kakao
Various	March 17, 2021	Digital download; streaming	Play M, Kakao
