= After School (song) =

2021 single by Weeekly

Single by Weeekly

from the album We Play
- Released: March 17, 2021
- Length: 3:25
- Label: Play M
- Composers: Daniel Durn; David Quinones; Denzil Remedios; Katrine Neya Klith Joergensen; Jazelle Paris; Ryan S. Jhun
- Lyricists: Seo Ji-eum; Seo Jeong-ah

Weeekly singles chronology
"Zig Zag" (2020)	"After School" (2021)	"Holiday Party" (2021)

Music video
- "After School" on YouTube

"After School" is a song recorded by South Korean girl group Weeekly. It was released on March 17, 2021, as the lead single from their third extended play We Play.

== Composition ==
"After School" was written by Seo Ji-eum and Seo Jeong-ah, composed by Daniel Durn, David Quinones, Denzil Remedios, Katrine Neya Klith Joergensen, Jazelle Paris, and Ryan S. Jhun, also arranged by Denzil Remedios and Ryan S. Jhun. Musically, the song was described as a "pop number mixed with reggae and trap beats" and an "impressive" song with "dynamic synthesizer and popping melody". Lyrically, it portrayed the "precious" time with friends after school. "After School" was composed in the key of C-sharp major, with a tempo of 164 beats per minute.

== Commercial performance ==
"After School" reached number 21 on the US Billboard World Digital Songs chart, also the group's first ever entry on the chart.

== Promotion ==
Weeekly promoted the single on several music programs starting from Mnet's M Countdown on March 18, 2021, KBS2's Music Bank on March 19, MBC's Show! Music Core on March 20, SBS's Inkigayo on March 21, SBS MTV's The Show on March 21, and Arirang TV's Simply K-Pop on March 29.

== Accolades ==
=== Awards and nominations ===
Name of the award ceremony, year presented, category, and the result of the nomination
Ceremony	Year	Category	Result	Ref.
Korean Music Awards	2022	Best K-pop Song	Nominated	

=== Listicles ===
"After School" on year-end lists
Publisher	Listicle	Rank	Ref.
CNN Philippines	Our favorite K-pop songs of 2021	Placed	
Idology	Top 10 Songs of the Year	Placed	
JoyNews24	Freshest Song	Placed	
NME	The 25 best K-Pop songs of 2021	17	
Paper	The 40 Best K-Pop Songs of 2021	4	
Rolling Stone India	21 Best Korean Music Videos of 2021	21	
South China Morning Post	The 20 best K-pop songs of 2021	8	
Teen Vogue	The 54 Best K-Pop Songs of 2021	Placed	
The Ringer	The Best K-Pop Songs of 2021	2	
Time	The Best K-pop Songs of 2021 So Far	Placed	
Time	The Best K-Pop Songs and Albums of 2021	Placed	

== Charts ==
Weekly chart performance for "After School"
Chart (2021)	Peak position
Malaysia (RIM)	16
Singapore (RIAS)	26
South Korea (Gaon)	155
US World Digital Song Sales (Billboard)	21

== Release history ==
Region	Date	Format(s)	Label(s)
Various	March 17, 2021	Digital download; streaming	Play M
