= Wannabe Ryan =

2020 South Korean television show

- Genre: Survival
- Starring: Kim Hee-chul; Shim Hyung-tak
- Country of origin: South Korea
- Original language: Korean
- No. of episodes: 16

Production
- Production company: Kakao M

Original release
- Network: KakaoTV
- Release: September 1 – November 20, 2020

Wannabe Ryan (Korean: 내 꿈은 라이언; lit. 'My Dream is Ryan') is a South Korean show. Produced by Kakao M, it aired on KakaoTV from September 1 to November 20, 2020 every Tuesday and Friday at 17:00 (KST).

== Format ==
Wannabe Ryan is a survival entertainment in which "Senior Ryan" is a role model, and dirt spoon mascots from all over the country enter the world's first mascot art general school "Mayejong" and challenge themselves to become senior graduates.

== Cast ==
=== Staff ===
- Kim Hee-chul : Head Student
- Shim Hyung-tak : Homeroom
- Choi Yoo-jung : Special student (episodes 1 - 5)
- Lee Na-eun : Special student (episodes 6 - 13)
- (G)I-dle (Miyeon, Yuqi) : Special students (episodes 14 - 16)

=== Student ===
- Dream
- Bow
- Bum, Bear
- Bucheon Handbrow
- Pamang
- Chamo
- Winnie
- Talking grandfather
- Corn parka
- Healey
- Victo

=== Special appearance ===
- Hong Jameon : Special Judge
- Holman : Special appearance (episodes 6 - 7)
- Lotty & Lori : Special Judge (episode 7)
- Krunk (YG Entertainment's Celeb bear)
- Shin Jeong-in : Special Judge
- Kim Bo-Tong : Special Judge

== OST ==
My Dream is Ryan OST

Soundtrack album
- Recorded: 2020
- Genre: Soundtrack
- Language: Korean
- Label: Kakao M

My Dream is Ryan OST 1
No.	Title	Lyrics	Music	Artist	Length
1.	"BoomChiKi"	MAVAGE; YONG; Good Choice; Shin Ji-youn	MAVAGE	Weeekly	2:00
2.	"BoomChiKi (Inst.)"		MAVAGE		2:00
