= Weeekly =

South Korean girl group

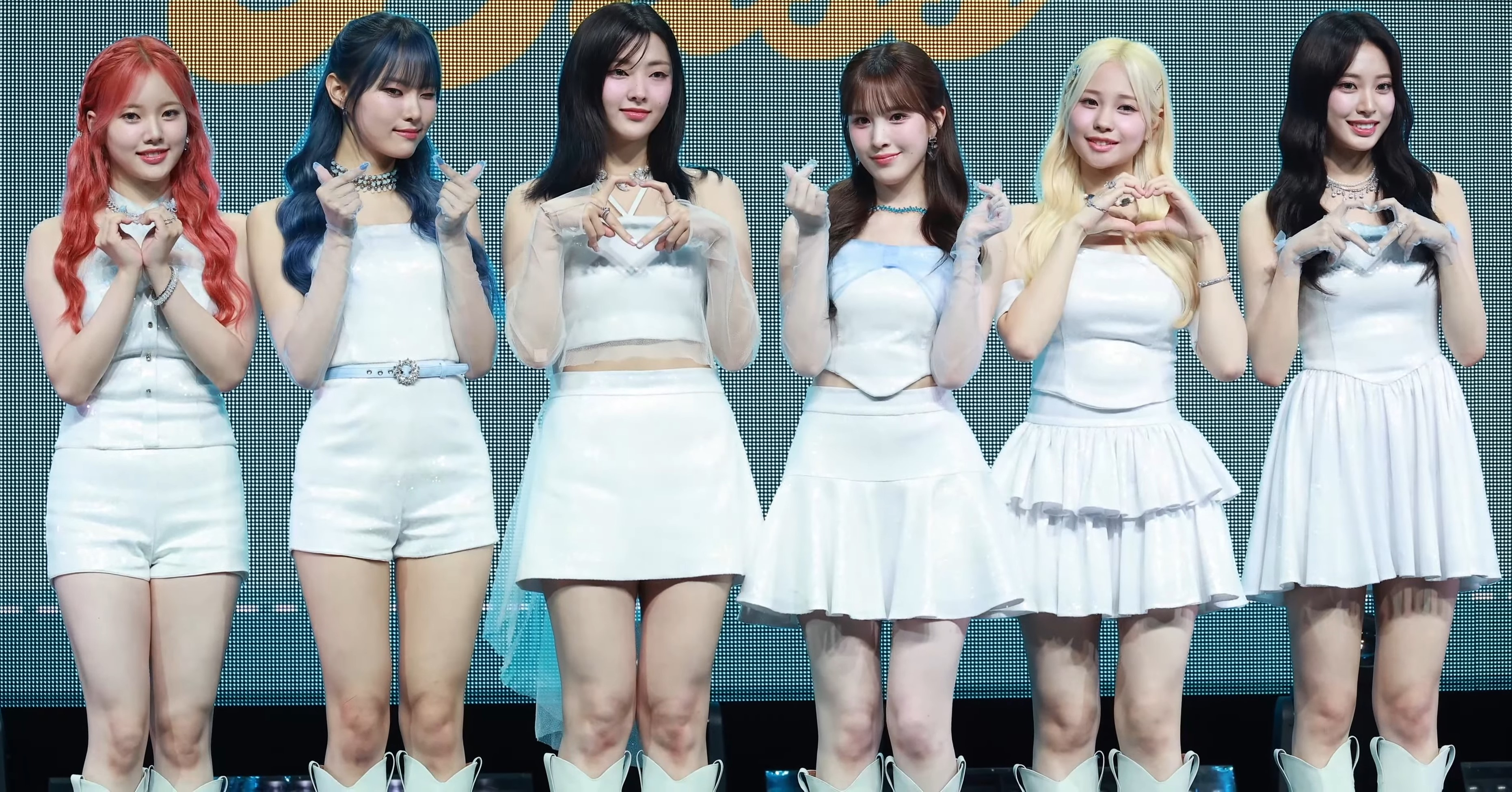
- Weeekly in July 2024 (L–R: Soojin, Monday, Soeun, Jaehee, Jihan, Zoa)

Background information
- Origin: Seoul, South Korea
- Genre: K-pop
- Years active: 2020–2025
- Label: IST
- Members: Soojin; Monday; Soeun; Jaehee; Jihan; Zoa
- Past members: Jiyoon

Weeekly (Korean: 위클리) was a South Korean girl group formed by IST Entertainment (formerly Play M Entertainment). The group was IST Entertainment's second girl group in ten years, after Apink. The group consists of six members: Soojin, Monday, Soeun, Jaehee, Jihan and Zoa. The group debuted on June 30, 2020, with their debut EP, We Are. Weeekly was originally a septet; Jiyoon left the group on June 1, 2022, citing mental health issues.

== Name ==
The group's name, Weeekly, taken from the role of the member in charge of each day of the week as the catchphrase says that "every day brings a new and special week."

== History ==
=== Pre-debut ===
Soojin, Jiyoon and Soeun were contestants of YG Entertainment and JTBC's survival show Mix Nine, with Soojin being the "prominent face" among the female contestants during the initial stages of the show's launch. However, on January 8, 2018, Soojin withdrew from the show following injury from a traffic accident and had received emergency surgery.

In October 2018, Fave Entertainment had announced its plans to debut a new girl group, temporarily named Fave Girls (페이브 걸즈, stylized as FAVE GIRLS). The lineup included Soojin, Jiyoon, Monday, Soeun and Jaehee. The group was subsequently named PlayM Girls (플레이엠 걸즈) following the merger of Plan A Entertainment and Fave Entertainment, to form Play M Entertainment, on April 1, 2019.

=== 2020: Debut with We Are and We Can ===
On May 8, 2020, Play M Entertainment announced that PlayM Girls were confirmed to make their debut in June. On May 11, the group name was revealed to be Weeekly, with all seven members of the group and their profile pictures revealed. On June 12, the group's debut extended play We Are was announced to be released on June 30, together with a release schedule.

Logo of Weeekly

On June 30, the music video for the EP's lead single "Tag Me (@Me)" was released 18 hours before the release of the EP. Subsequently, We Are was released digitally, with Jiyoon involved in writing and composing two songs of the EP. The group had a press showcase on the same day. Originally, the group would also have a live debut showcase through V Live, but a fire that broke out near the venue of the showcase resulted in its cancelation. The music video for "Tag Me (@Me)" went on to achieve 10 million views in its first 7 days, while the EP sold over 10,000 copies within its first 8 days.

The group sang KakaoTV variety show Wannabe Ryan's signal song "Boom Chi Ki" (붐 치키). The single was digitally released on September 25. On September 28, the Korean Consumer Forum awarded Weeekly the "Female Rookie of the Year Award," using data from a poll of over 550,000 Koreans.

The group released their second EP We Can on October 13, featuring the lead single "Zig Zag". On October 15, they had their debut stage for the song on M Countdown. The choreography was distinct for its integration of 10-pound cubes into the dance, which the members pushed around the stage. The song achieved 10 million views on YouTube within 4 days, beating their previous record.

=== 2021: We Play, Play Game: Holiday and Jiyoon's hiatus ===
On February 22, local news outlet Sport TV News reported that Weeekly was preparing for a comeback in March with a new album. Later that day, the reports were confirmed by Play M Entertainment. An image teaser posted on the group's social media accounts announced their third mini album, We Play, would be released on March 17. On March 17, the mini album, along with its title track "After School", were released.

On May 28, the group released a single "7Days Tension", in collaboration with South Korean eyewear brand Davich.

On July 13, Play M Entertainment confirmed Weeekly was preparing for a comeback, aiming for an early August release. On July 15, an image teaser posted across the group's social medias announced their fourth mini album, titled Play Game: Holiday, would be released on August 4. On August 1, PlayM Entertainment released a statement announcing that Jiyoon would be going on hiatus temporarily from all activities due to reoccurring stress and anxiety. Thus, the group's mini album Play Game : Holiday, will be promoted as six members. On August 4, the mini album, along with its title track "Holiday Party" was released.

On December 14, Play M Entertainment (now going under the name IST Entertainment) announced Jiyoon's return from hiatus starting from December 15 and will continue activities with the group.

=== 2022: Play Game: Awake and Jiyoon's departure ===
On February 28, it was announced that Jiyoon would be taking a hiatus temporarily due to tension and anxiety.

On February 15, it was announced that Weeekly will be releasing their first single album, Play Game: Awake on March 7, featuring "Ven Para" as the lead single. On February 28, it was announced that Jiyoon will not be participating in the album's promotions due to focusing on treatment and recovery for her anxiety.

On June 1, IST Entertainment released a statement regarding Jiyoon's departure from the group, which stated that after having discussions with Jiyoon and her family, it was decided it would be best for her to continue receiving treatment in an environment that helps improve her mental health, thus turning Weeekly into a sextet.

=== 2023: Queendom Puzzle participation, Fansong, and ColoRise ===
On April 24, it was confirmed that some members of Weeekly will be participating in the Mnet's new Queendom competition show series, Queendom Puzzle, which started from June 2023. The four participating members were announced through Mnet's M Countdown on May 18 and 25. Jihan and Soeun appeared as part of the "PICK on the top" team on the 18th, and Soojin and Zoa made their appearance as part of the "DROP The Beat" team on the 25th. Eventually, Jihan finished in 10th place, Zoa in 19th place, Soojin in 21st place and Soeun in 23rd place.

On September 12, the group released a digital single "Good Day (Special Daileee)" as a fansong for their fans, Daileee. On September 25, IST Entertainment revealed that the release of Weeekly's fifth extended play was pushed back to November 1 from the previously confirmed October date, marking one year and seven months since the release of the group's last physical album.

The group released their fifth EP, ColoRise, as well as the music video for the lead single "Vroom Vroom" on November 1 at 6 pm KST.

=== 2024: Stranger and Bliss ===
Weeekly released the digital single "Stranger" on January 25, which was a pre-release for their single album, which would release in July. On June 12, IST Entertainment announced that the group would come back with their sixth mini album on July 9. On June 19, they released a promotion scheduler for Bliss. On July 9, the group made their comeback with the release of the sixth EP Bliss, along with its lead single "Lights On".

=== 2025: Departure from IST Entertainment ===
On February 26, it was reported that all Weeekly members terminated their contract with IST Entertainment; it is unknown if the group will disband or join a new agency.

== Endorsements ==
On May 11, 2021, Weeekly was selected as the advertising model for Korean eyewear brand Davich Optical Chain's Tension 7-Day Lens contact lenses. In August, Soojin was selected as the ambassador for the 23rd Bucheon International Animation Festival (BIAF2021) that was held from October 22 to 26.

In August 2022, Weeekly collaborated with AliMoli Studio for an XR Animation Game Astrostation that is planned for release. It is a 3D VR animation game with the theme of "Space Exploration". The project revolves around the theme of collaboration between the Korean Wave Industry and Media Content Companies that allowing them to promote contents with idea and marketing support, and can expect various concepts and genre expansions. They have appeared in the CAST Park Festival at Gwanghwamun, on October 23 to introduce the product to domestic consumers.

== Members ==
- Soojin (수진) – leader, dancer, vocalist
- Monday (먼데이) – vocalist, rapper, dancer
- Soeun (소은) – dancer, vocalist
- Jaehee (재희) – vocalist, rapper
- Jihan (지한) – vocalist
- Zoa (조아) – vocalist, rapper

=== Past members ===
- Jiyoon (지윤) – vocalist, rapper

== Discography ==
=== Extended plays ===
Title	Details	Peak chart positions	Sales
Title	Details	KOR	Sales
We Are	Released: June 30, 2020; Label: Play M Entertainment; Formats: CD, digital download, streaming	16	KOR: 21,450
We Can	Released: October 13, 2020; Label: Play M Entertainment; Formats: CD, digital download, streaming	10	KOR: 26,459
We Play	Released: March 17, 2021; Label: Play M Entertainment; Formats: CD, digital download, streaming	10	KOR: 42,739
Play Game: Holiday	Released: August 4, 2021; Label: Play M Entertainment; Formats: CD, digital download, streaming	4	KOR: 46,367
ColoRise	Released: November 1, 2023; Label: IST Entertainment; Formats: CD, digital download, streaming	8	KOR: 72,250
Bliss	Released: July 9, 2024; Label: IST Entertainment; Formats: CD, digital download, streaming	14	KOR: 28,163

=== Single albums ===
Title	Details	Peak chart positions	Sales
Title	Details	KOR	Sales
Play Game: Awake	Released: March 7, 2022; Label: IST Entertainment; Formats: CD, digital download, streaming; Track listing: 1. Ven Para; 2. Solar; 3. Where Is My Love?	4	KOR: 83,189

=== Singles ===
List of singles, with selected chart positions, showing year released and album name
Title	Year	Peak chart positions				Album
Title	Year	KOR	MYS	SGP	US World	Album
"Tag Me (@Me)"	2020	—	—	—	—	We Are
"Zig Zag"	2020	—	—	—	—	We Can
"After School"	2021	155	16	26	21	We Play
"Holiday Party"	2021	— (Note: "Holiday Party" did not enter the Gaon Digital Chart, but peaked at number 54 on the component Download Chart.)	—	—	—	Play Game: Holiday
"Ven Para"	2022	— (Note: "Ven Para" did not enter the Gaon Digital Chart, but peaked at number 48 on the component Download Chart.)	—	—	—	Play Game: Awake
"Love" (러브)	2022	— (Note: "Love" did not enter the Circle Digital Chart, but peaked at number 85 on the component Download Chart.)	—	—	—	From Kim Eana Part. 2
"Airplane Mode"	2022	—	—	—	—	Listen-Up EP. 1
"Happy Christmas"	2022	—	—	—	—	YAOKI Project Part. 1
"Good Day (Special Daileee)"	2023	— (Note: "Good Day (Special Daileee)" did not enter the Circle Digital Chart, but peaked at number 92 on the component Download Chart.)	—	—	—	ColoRise
"Vroom Vroom"	2023	— (Note: "Vroom Vroom" did not enter the Circle Digital Chart, but peaked at number 84 on the component Download Chart.)	—	—	—	ColoRise
"Stranger"	2024	— (Note: "Stranger" did not enter the Circle Digital Chart, but peaked at number 98 on the component Download Chart.)	—	—	—	Bliss
"Lights On"	2024	— (Note: "Lights On" did not enter the Circle Digital Chart, but peaked at number 44 on the component Download Chart.)	—	—	—	Bliss
"—" denotes releases that did not chart or were not released in that region.

=== Collaborations ===
List of collaborations, showing year released and album name
Title	Year	Album
"Maboroshi Phone Booth" (환상공중전화) (sung by Lee Soo-jin with D-Hack)	2021	Maboroshi Phone Booth

=== Soundtrack appearances ===
List of soundtrack appearances, showing year released, selected chart positions, and name of the album
Title	Year	Peak chart positions	Album
Title	Year	KOR	Album
"Boom Chi Ki" (붐 치키)	2020	—	Wannabe Ryan OST Part 1
"Draw Into You" (너로 물든다는 것) (Sung by Monday)	2020	— (Note: "Draw Into You" did not enter the Gaon Digital Chart, but peaked at number 32 on the component BGM Chart.)	When I Was Most Beautiful OST Part 6
"Wake Up"	2021	—	Hello, Me! OST Part 1
"Like A Star" (별처럼 니가 내려와) (Sung by Monday)	2021	— (Note: "Like A Star" did not enter the Gaon Digital Chart, but peaked at numbers 92 and 3 on the Download Chart and BGM Chart, respectively.)	Police University OST Part 2
"Best Friend (We Can)"	2021	—	The World of My 17 Season 2 OST Part 1
"First Love" (니가조아) (Sung by Zoa with Bumkey)	2022	— (Note: "First Love" did not enter the Gaon Digital Chart, but peaked at number 45 on the component BGM Chart.)	3.5th Period OST Part 3
"Fall In Love" (사랑이 내 안에 들어와) (Sung by Park So-eun and Jihan)	2022	— (Note: "Fall In Love" did not enter the Gaon Digital Chart, but peaked at number 87 and 19 on the Download Chart and BGM Chart, respectively.)	Business Proposal OST Part 6
"Airplane Mode"	2022	—	Listen Up OST Part 1
"Latte Latte" (Sung by Jihan)	2023	—	Kokdu: Season Of Deity OST Part 4
"I Wanna Fly"	2023	—	Strong Girl Namsoon OST Part 6
"—" denotes releases that did not chart or were not released in that region.

=== Compilation appearances ===
List of compilation appearances, showing year released, and name of the album
Title	Year	Album
"Atlantis Princess" (Sung by Monday and Inseong)	2022	Watcha Original <Double Trouble> 1st EP 'Black Swan'
"Sonata of Temptation" (Sung by Monday and Im Seul-ong)	2022	Watcha Original <Double Trouble> 2nd EP Crown 'Sonata Of Temptation'
"Love Me or Leave Me" (Sung by Monday and Jang Hyun-seung)	2022	Watcha Original <Double Trouble> 3rd EP Conceptual – Fantasy 'Love Me or Leave Me'
"Trouble Maker" (Sung by Monday and Kim Dong-han)	2022	Watcha Original <Double Trouble> 4th EP Legend Duet – 'Trouble Maker'
"Again & Again" (Sung by Monday and Lim Seul-ong)	2022	Watcha Original <Double Trouble> 5th EP History – 'Again & Again'
"Call" (매일밤)	2022	Lee Hong-ki's Playlist [Once]
"What's Your Name?" (이름이 뭐예요?) (with Moon Chae-won)	2022	Immortal Songs: Singing the Legend (New Kids on the Masterpieces Special)
"Charismatic" (Sung by Jihan, Park Soeun, Jiwon, Jiwoo, Nana, Wooyeon)	2023	Queendom Puzzle Team Battle 1
"Charismatic" (Sung by Lee Soojin, Zoa, JooE, Seoyeon, Suyun, Yeonhee)	2023	Queendom Puzzle Team Battle 2
"Wannabe" (Sung by Jihan, Jiwon, Riina, Sangah, Wooyeon)	2023	Queendom Puzzle All-Rounder Battle 1
"Time of Our Life" (한 페이지가 될 수 있게) (Sung by Park Soeun, Chaerin, Elly, Hwiseo, Miru)	2023	Queendom Puzzle All-Rounder Battle 1
"Web" (선) (Sung by Jihan, Zoa, Bora, Jiwon, Riina, Yuki, Yeoreum)	2023	Queendom Puzzle All-Rounder Battle 2
"Overwater" (Sung by Lee Soojin, Dohwa, Fye, Jiwoo, Miru, Seoyeon)	2023	Queendom Puzzle All-Rounder Battle 2
"Glow-up" (Sung by Park Soeun, Chaerin, Elly, Hwiseo, Juri, JooE, Yeonhee)	2023	Queendom Puzzle All-Rounder Battle 2
"Puzzlin'" (Sung by Lee Soojin, Jiwon, Kei, Miru, Riina, Suyun, Wooyeon)	2023	Queendom Puzzle Semi Final
"I Do" (Sung by Jihan, Zoa, Bora, Juri, Jiwoo, Nana, Yeonhee)	2023	Queendom Puzzle Semi Final
"Billionaire" (Sung by Jihan, Kei, Nana, Suyun, Wooyeon, Yeonhee, Yuki)	2023	Queendom Puzzle Final
"Good Bye" (Sung by Jihan)	2023	Into My Playlist Part.07

=== Other releases ===
List of other releases, showing year released and album name
Title	Year	Album
Signal Song
"Come to Play" (놀러와)	2020	Non-album single
Promotional
"7Days Tension" (텐션업)	2021	Non-album single

== Filmography ==
=== Television show ===
Year	Title	Role	Note(s)	Ref.
2021	Kingdom: Legendary War	Special Evaluator	Episode 7–8	
2022	Immortal Songs: Singing the Legend	Representative Singer	Episode 559	
2022	K-Producer Battle 'Listen-Up'	Representative Singer	Episode 1	
2022	Idol Star Athletics Championships	Contestant	Episode 1–3	
2023	Weeekle Weeekle Holiday	Themselves	5 Episode	
2023	Queendom Puzzle	Contestant	Premiered in June	

=== Television series ===
Year	Title	Role	Note(s)	Ref.
2022	Today's Webtoon	Weeekly	Cameo (Episode 1)	

=== Web series ===
Year	Title	Role	Note(s)	Ref.
2020	Teenager To Do List	Students	Main Role	

=== Web show ===
Year	Title	Ref.
2020	The Weeekly Story	
2020	PlayM Hard Training Team	
2020	We Clear	
2021	My First Time In My Life	
2021	Weeekly's Pension Vacation	
2021	Weee:mergency	
2021–2022	Weeekly Time	
2022	Weeekly Daegu Tour V-log	
2023	We Can Do It	
2023	Weeekle Weeekle Holiday	
2023	VROOM VROOM in Hanoi with UnionPay	

== Videography ==
=== Music videos ===
Title	Year	Director(s)	Ref.
"Tag Me (@Me)"	2020	Kim Jak-young (Flexible Pictures)	
"Zig Zag"	2020	Kim Zi-young, Shin Dongle (FantazyLab)	
"After School"	2021	Jimmy (VIA)	
"7days Tension"	2021	Jimmy (VIA)	
"Holiday Party"	2021	Jimmy (VIA)	
"Check It Out"	2021	Lee Soo-jin, Monday, Shin Ji-yoon	
"Ven para"	2022	Seo Dong-hyeok (FLIPEVIL)	
"Top Secret (몰래몰래)"	2022	Lee Soo-jin, Monday	
"Love"	2022	Lee Yu-young, Lee Jae-hyun @ SNP Film	
"Happy Christmas"	2022	gabixong (GABI)	
"Good Day (Special Daileee)"	2023	hansunwoo	
"Vroom Vroom"	2023	Naive Creative Production	
"Backwards" (Performance Video)	2023	novv kim (NOVV)	
"A+" (Performance Video)	2023	Jeong Chan-ho (JLOS)	
"Sweet Dream" (Performance Video)	2023	Jeong Chan-ho (JLOS)	
"Stranger"	2024	Unknown	
"Stranger" English Version	2024	Unknown	
"Lights On"	2024	Kang Min-gyu (GEW) (SL8 Visual Lab)	

== Concerts ==
=== Fanmeeting ===
- WU(Weeekly University) (2024)
- WU(Weeekly University) in Japan (2024)

=== Concert ===
- 1st Grand America Tour <WU(Weeekly University)> (2024)

=== Pre-debut concerts ===
- Favegirls 1st Pre-show <We?> (2018)
- Favegirls Pre-show <We?>: Our Christmas (2018)
- Favegirls Pre-show <We?>: Our New Days! (2019)

=== Concert participation ===
- KCON:TACT 4U (2021)
- KCON:TACT HI 5 (2021)
- 2021 Asia Song Festival (2021)
- The 28th 2022 Dream Concert (2022)
- HallyuPopFest London 2022 (2022)

== Accolades ==
=== Awards and nominations ===
Name of the award ceremony, year presented, award category, nominee(s) of the award, and the result of the nomination
Award ceremony	Year	Category	Nominee(s)/work(s)	Result	Ref.
Asia Artist Awards	2020	Popularity Award – Singer (Female)	Weeekly	Longlisted	
Asia Artist Awards	2021	New Wave Singer Award	Weeekly	Won	
Asia Artist Awards	2021	U+Idol Live Popularity Award – Singer (Female)	Weeekly	Nominated	
Asia Artist Awards	2021	RET Popularity Award – Singer (Female)	Weeekly	Nominated	
Asia Artist Awards	2022	DCM Popularity Award – Singer (Female)	Weeekly	Nominated	
Asia Artist Awards	2022	Idolplus Popularity Award – Singer	Weeekly	Nominated	
Asia Artist Awards	2023	Popularity Award – Singer (Female)	Weeekly	Longlisted	
Asia Model Awards	2020	New Star Award - Female Group	Weeekly	Won	
Brand of the Year Awards	2020	Best Rookie Female Idol Award	Weeekly	Won	
Brand of the Year Awards	2021	Rising Star Female Idol	Weeekly	Won	
Brand Customer Loyalty Awards	2021	Best Female Rookie Award	Weeekly	Nominated	
Hanteo Music Awards	2023	Emerging Artist Award	Weeekly	Nominated	
Hanteo Music Awards	2024	Post Generation Award	Weeekly	Pending	
Korea Culture Entertainment Awards	2021	K-Pop Star Award	Weeekly	Won	
Korea Culture Entertainment Awards	2022	K-Pop Star Award	Weeekly	Won	
Korea First Brand Awards	2021	Rookie Female Idol Award	Weeekly	Won	
Korea First Brand Awards	2022	Female Idol Rising Star Award	Weeekly	Nominated	
Korean Music Awards	2022	Best K-pop Song	"After School"	Nominated	
Melon Music Awards	2020	New Artist of the Year - Female	Weeekly	Won	
Mnet Asian Music Awards	2020	Best New Female Artist	Weeekly	Won	
Mnet Asian Music Awards	2020	Artist of the Year	Weeekly	Nominated	
Mnet Asian Music Awards	2020	Worldwide Icon of the Year	Weeekly	Nominated	
Mnet Asian Music Awards	2021	Worldwide Fan's Choice Top 10	Weeekly	Shortlisted	
MTV Europe Music Awards	2021	Best Korean Act	Weeekly	Nominated	
Seoul Music Awards	2021	K-wave Popularity Award	Weeekly	Nominated	
Seoul Music Awards	2021	Popularity Award	Weeekly	Nominated	
Seoul Music Awards	2021	Rookie of the Year	Weeekly	Nominated	
The Fact Music Awards	2020	Next Leader Award	Weeekly	Won	
The Fact Music Awards	2020	TMA Popularity Award	Weeekly	Nominated	
The Fact Music Awards	2021	Global Hottest Award	Weeekly	Won	
The Fact Music Awards	2021	Fan N Star Choice (Artist)	Weeekly	Nominated	

=== Listicles ===
Name of publisher, year listed, name of listicle, and placement
Publisher	Year	Listicle	Placement	Ref.
Billboard Korea	2021	Best Rookie	Placed	
JoyNews24	2021	Most Anticipated Artist of Late 2021 and 2022	Placed	
Time	2021	6 Rookie K-Pop Groups to Watch in 2021	Placed	
