= Play Game: Holiday =

- Digital version cover

EP by Weeekly
- Released: August 4, 2021
- Genre: K-pop
- Length: 17:00
- Language: Korean
- Labels: Play M; Kakao

Weeekly chronology
We Play (2021)	Play Game: Holiday (2021)	Play Game: Awake (2022)

Singles from Play Game: Holiday
- 1. "Holiday Party" Released: August 4, 2021

Play Game: Holiday is the fourth extended play by South Korean girl group Weeekly. It was released on August 4, 2021 by Play M and distributed by Kakao. The physical version of the EP was made available in two versions: "E World" and "M World". It contains five tracks, including the lead single "Holiday Party".

== Promotion ==
They promoted the single "Holiday Party" at SBS's Inkigayo

== Track listing ==
Credits adapted from Melon.

No.	Title	Lyrics	Music	Arrangement	Length
1.	"Weekend"	danke; Inner Child (MonoTree)	pdly (MonoTree); Inner Child (MonoTree)	pdly (MonoTree)	3:15
2.	"Check It Out"	Jo Yoon-kyung	Secret Weapon; Christian Fast; Maria Marcus	Secret Weapon	3:26
3.	"Holiday Party"	Lee Seu-ran	Coach & Sendo; Cazzi Opeia; Ellen Berg	Coach & Sendo	3:09
4.	"La Luna"	Lee Seu-ran	BlueRhythm; Frankie Day (THE HUB)	BlueRhythm	3:37
5.	"Memories Of Summer Rain"	Lee Hyeon-sang (ARTMATIC); DK arnold; Socio Kate	Lee Hyeon-sang (ARTMATIC); Choi Ji-san (ARTMATIC); XLMT; Xelor	Lee Hyeon-sang (ARTMATIC); Choi Ji-san (ARTMATIC); XLMT	3:31
Total length:					17:00

== Charts ==
Chart (2021)	Peak position
South Korean Albums (Gaon)	4

== Release history ==
Region	Date	Format	Label
South Korea	August 4, 2021	CD; digital download; streaming	Play M, Kakao
Various	August 4, 2021	Digital download; streaming	Play M, Kakao
