= Play Game: Awake =

- Digital cover

Single album by Weeekly
- Released: March 7, 2022
- Recorded: 2022
- Genre: Hip hop; R&B
- Length: 9:41
- Language: Korean
- Label: IST; Kakao

Weeekly chronology
Play Game: Holiday (2021)	Play Game: Awake (2022)	ColoRise (2023)

Singles from Play Game: Awake
- 1. "Ven Para" Released: March 7, 2022

Play Game: Awake is the first single album by South Korean girl group Weeekly. It was released on March 7, 2022, through IST Entertainment. The single album consists of three tracks, including the lead single "Ven Para". This is the last project to feature former member Shin Ji-yoon, before departing from the group on June 1, 2022.

== Background ==
On February 28, 2022, it was announced that Shin Ji-yoon would be taking a hiatus temporarily due to tension and anxiety, therefore she will not be participating in promotions. The group released Play Game: Awake on March 7, featuring "Ven Para" as the lead single.

== Reception ==
Rhian Daly of NME gave the album three stars out of five. Rhian described the lead single, "Ven Para" as "messy and jarring" but praised one of the verses as "a nice respite from the discordance". "Solar" was said as "much more cohesive and powerful, but still struggles to really make its mark". "Where Is My Love?" was criticized for "missing that special spark" but complemented for its "soulful piece of soft pop".

== Track listing ==
Play Game: Awake track listing
No.	Title	Lyrics	Music	Arrangement	Length
1.	"Ven Para"	Jo Yoon-kyung	BlueRhythm; Charlotte Wilson (THE HUB); Ayushy (THE HUB); Awry (THE HUB); Jan Baars (THE HUB)	BlueRhythm	3:14
2.	"Solar"	Lee Seu-ran	GARDEN; Tommy Park; Charlotte Wilson (THE HUB); Frankie Day (THE HUB); Ayushy (THE HUB)	Garden	3:22
3.	"Where Is My Love?"	Lee Joo-hyung (MonoTree); Kwon Ae-jin (MonoTree)	Lee Joo-hyung (MonoTree); Kwon Ae-jin (MonoTree)	Lee Joo-hyung (MonoTree)	3:05
Total length:					9:41

== Charts ==
Chart performance for Play Game: Awake
Chart (2022)	Peak position
South Korean Albums (Gaon)	4

== Release history ==
Release history and formats for Play Game: Awake
Region	Date	Format	Label
Various	March 7, 2022	Digital download; streaming	IST Entertainment; Kakao Entertainment
Various	March 7, 2022	CD	IST Entertainment; Kakao Entertainment
