= Autumn Vacation (album) =

Studio album by Autumn Vacation
- Released: October 7, 2010
- Genre: Indie pop, folk
- Length: 43:27
- Label: Music & New

Autumn Vacation chronology
Autumn Vacation (2010)	Clarity (2013)

Autumn Vacation (Korean: 가을방학; RR: Gaeul banghak) is the debut studio album by South Korean indie pop band Autumn Vacation. The album was released on 7 October 2010.

== Background ==
Autumn Vacation is a duo formed by Bobby Chung from Onnine Ibalgwan and Julia Hart, and Gyepy from Broccoli, You Too?. They say they took the band name from the song they first worked on, which became the title track of the album. All tracks on the album were composed and written by Bobby Chung, based on which Gyepy was recorded singing.

== Critical reception ==
Professional ratings
Review scores
Source	Rating
IZM	3/5 stars

Cho Areum of IZM reviewed "Autumn Vacation, which doesn't have to listen to boringly repetitive phrases and sentences that only take up seats without knowing why, is more than courtesy and nostalgia for the past." Kim Hakseon, the editor of web magazine Boda said "As it has been, Jung Daewook (Bobby Chung's real name) made soft lyrics and melodies, and Gyepy added a faint voice to them." Music Critic Han Dongyoon described the album as Autumn Vacation is likely to be a welcome background music in autumn thanks to its innocent and clear shape.

== Track listing ==
No.	Title	Length
1.	"Between the Fresh Yellow and the Fresh Red" ("샛노랑과 새빨강 사이")	3:54
2.	"Live Together" ("동거")	3:47
3.	"Rain in Each Place" ("곳에 따라 비")	3:38
4.	"Still Dreaming Ahough I Tricked" ("속아도 꿈결")	3:37
5.	"My Hobby is Love" ("취미는 사랑")	2:57
6.	"Sometimes I Want to Hug You Like Crazy" ("가끔 미치도록 네가 안고 싶어질 때가 있어")	4:03
7.	"Eevna" ("이브나")	3:33
8.	"3x4"	4:19
9.	"The Popular Boy" ("인기 있는 남자애")	3:04
10.	"The Seat Where A Butterfly Sits" ("나비가 앉은 자리")	3:33
11.	"Autumn Vacation" ("가을방학")	3:57
12.	"Overbreathing" ("호흡과다")	3:05
