= Blue Punch =

Extended play by Rocket Punch

EP by Rocket Punch
- Released: August 4, 2020
- Recorded: 2020
- Genres: K-pop; EDM trap
- Language: Korean
- Label: Woollim

Rocket Punch chronology
Red Punch (2020)	Blue Punch (2020)	Ring Ring (2021)

Singles from Blue Punch
- 1. "Juicy" Released: August 4, 2020

Blue Punch is the third extended play by South Korean girl group Rocket Punch. The album was released digitally and physically on August 4, 2020, by Woollim Entertainment. The EP contains six tracks, including the lead single "Juicy".

== Background and release ==
On July 24, 2020, Woollim Entertainment released a teaser photo announcing that Rocket Punch would make a comeback with their third EP Blue Punch on August 4.

On July 26, they released the album tracklist for Blue Punch, confirming "Juicy" as the lead single. On July 12, the identity film teaser and the group concept photo for Blue Punch was released. On July 28, the concept teaser film and individual teaser photos for Yeonhee and Suyun was released. On July 29, the concept teaser film and individual teaser photos for Yunkyoung and Sohee was released. On July 30, the concept teaser film and individual teaser photos for Juri and Dahyun was released. On July 31, the music video teaser for Juicy and another group concept photo for Blue Punch was released. Two days later, on August 2, the highlight medley for Blue Punch was released.

On August 4, they released Blue Punch along with the music video for "Juicy".

== Promotion ==
Rocket Punch promoted the single "Juicy" for the first time on September 16, 2020, on Mnet's M Countdown.

== Track listing ==
Blue Punch track listing
No.	Title	Lyrics	Music	Arrangement	Length
1.	"Blue Punch"		Iggy; Yongbae	Iggy; Yongbae	1:04
2.	"Juicy"	Iggy; Yongbae	Iggy; Yongbae	Iggy; Yongbae	3:19
3.	"Summer Punch!"	Llano (Stupid Squad)	Puravida; Audi Mok; Tysha Tiar	Puravida	3:15
4.	"Summer Night" (여름밤)	Park Ji-yeon (MonoTree)	GDLO (MonoTree); Yoon Jong-seong (MonoTree); Lee Tae-hoon	Yoon Jong-seong (MonoTree); Lee Tae-hoon	3:17
5.	"Twinkle Star"	Puravida	Puravida; Rheat (Code 9)	Rheat (Code 9)	3:39
6.	"The The"	Nano; Hidden Sound (HSND); HanGang (HSND)	Hidden Sound (HSND); HanGang (HSND); Nano	Hidden Sound (HSND); HanGang (HSND); Nano	3:06
Total length:					17:40

== Charts ==
=== Weekly ===
Chart (2020)	Peak position
South Korean Albums (Gaon)	6

=== Monthly ===
Chart (2020)	Peak position
South Korean Albums (Gaon)	17

== Release history ==
Country	Date	Format	Label
South Korea	August 4, 2020	CD, digital download, streaming	Woollim, Kakao M
Various	August 4, 2020	CD, digital download, streaming	Woollim, Kakao M
