= Red Punch =

EP by Rocket Punch
- Released: February 10, 2020
- Recorded: 2019
- Studio: Woollim Studios
- Genre: K-pop; dance-pop; moombahton
- Language: Korean
- Label: Woollim

Rocket Punch chronology
Pink Punch (2019)	Red Punch (2020)	Blue Punch (2020)

Singles from Red Punch
- 1. "Bouncy" Released: February 10, 2020

Red Punch is the second extended play by South Korean girl group Rocket Punch. The album was released digitally and physically on February 10, 2020 by Woollim Entertainment. The EP contains seven tracks with the lead single "Bouncy".

== Release and promotion ==
On January 28, 2020, the group released a comeback schedule containing multiple dates for sequential release of content for the album. On January 29, the first set of solo Version A concept photos and moving poster teasers featuring members Sohee and Dahyun were released. On January 30, the solo concept photos and moving poster teasers of members Yeonhee and Yoonkyung were released. On January 31, the solo concept photos and moving poster teasers of members Juri and Suyun was released alongside.

On February 1, a jacket shooting video of members Juri, Suyun, and Dahyun were released. On February 2, another jacket making video of members Yeon-hee, Yoon-kyung and So-hee was released. The full album tracklist was released on February 3. A short version of the music video teaser of the lead single "Bouncy" was released on February 4. On February 5, the group released the second version of concept photos for the album. On February 6, a performance teaser for "Bounce" was released. On February 7, a highlight medley of the album was released containing a preview of the seven album tracks. The album was released on February 10 in CD and digital formats. An accompanying music video for the lead single "Bouncy" was released in conjunction with the release of the album.

Hours after the album's release, Rocket Punch held a showcase at the Blue Square iMarket Hall, Hannam-dong, Yongsan-gu, Seoul which was broadcast via Naver's V Live app. They performed songs from the album for the first time at the showcase. The group promoted the album through a series of live performances on various South Korean music shows, starting with Mnet's M Countdown on February 13, where they performed "Bouncy".

== Track listing ==
Red Punch track listing
No.	Title	Lyrics	Music	Arrangement	Length
1.	"Red Punch"		Code 9	Code 9	1:07
2.	"Bouncy"	Code 9, Puravida	Code 9, Puravida	Code 9	3:28
3.	"So Solo"	Misung	Space One, Anna Timgren	Space One	3:05
4.	"Fireworks"	Llano (Stupid Squad)	Stardust, Takey	Stardust	3:28
5.	"Paper Star" (종이별)	January 8th, Min Yeon-jae	J. Yoon	J. Yoon	3:26
6.	"Lilac" (다시, 봄)	Iggy, Yongbae	Iggy, Yongbae	Mingki	3:30
7.	"Girl Friend" (여자사람친구)	Score (13), Megatone (13), Door (13)	Score (13), Megatone (13), Door (13)	Score (13), Megatone (13)	3:07
Total length:					21:11

== Charts ==
Sales chart performance for Red Punch
Chart (2020)	Peak position
South Korean Albums (Gaon)	4
