= Pink Punch =

Extended play by Rocket Punch

EP by Rocket Punch
- Released: August 7, 2019
- Recorded: 2019
- Studio: Woollim Studios
- Genre: K-pop; dance-pop; moombahton
- Length: 18:12
- Language: Korean
- Label: Woollim

Rocket Punch chronology
Pink Punch (2019)	Red Punch (2020)

Singles from Pink Punch
- 1. "Bim Bam Bum" Released: August 7, 2019

Pink Punch is the debut extended play by South Korean girl group Rocket Punch. The album was released digitally and physically on August 7, 2019 by Woollim Entertainment. The EP contains six tracks with the lead single "Bim Bam Bum".

== Background and release ==
On July 22, 2019, Woollim Entertainment announced via SNS that Rocket Punch would debut.

Concept images featuring each of the members were released on July 31. The album contains six tracks including the lead single "Bim Bam Bum". The music video teaser was released on August 4 and the full music video on August 7.

== Promotion ==
Rocket Punch held a live showcase at the Blue Square YES24 Live Hall on August 7, 2019, where they performed "Bim Bam Bum" along with "Lucid Dream" and "Love is Over".

The group started promoting the lead single "Bim Bam Bum" on August 8. They first performed the lead single on Mnet's M Countdown, followed by performances on KBS' Music Bank, MBC's Show! Music Core and SBS' Inkigayo. After ending promotions for "Bim Bam Bum", the group then continued promoting through the performances of the album's side track "Love Is Over" on music shows.

== Track listing ==
No.	Title	Lyrics	Music	Arrangement	Length
1.	"Pink Punch"		Iggy (Oreo), Yongbae	Iggy (Oreo), Yongbae	01:00
2.	"Bim Bam Bum" (빔밤붐)	Iggy (Oreo), Yongbae	Iggy (Oreo), Yongbae	Iggy (Oreo), Yongbae	03:16
3.	"Love Is Over"	Jarry Potter (Yummy Tone)	Big Sancho (Yummy Tone), Jarry Potter (Yummy Tone)	Big Sancho (Yummy Tone)	03:28
4.	"Lucid Dream"	Code 9	Code 9	Code 9	04:03
5.	"Favorite" (특이점)	danke, Stardust	Stardust	Stardust	03:15
6.	"Do something" (선을 넘어)	Code 9	Code 9	Code 9	03:06
Total length:					18:12

== Charts ==
Chart (2019)	Peak position
South Korean Albums (Gaon)	6

== Release history ==
Region	Date	Format	Distributor
Various	August 7, 2019	Digital download	Woollim Entertainment; Kakao M
South Korea	August 7, 2019	Digital download	Woollim Entertainment; Kakao M
South Korea	August 7, 2019	CD	Woollim Entertainment; Kakao M
