= UNVS =

South Korean boy group

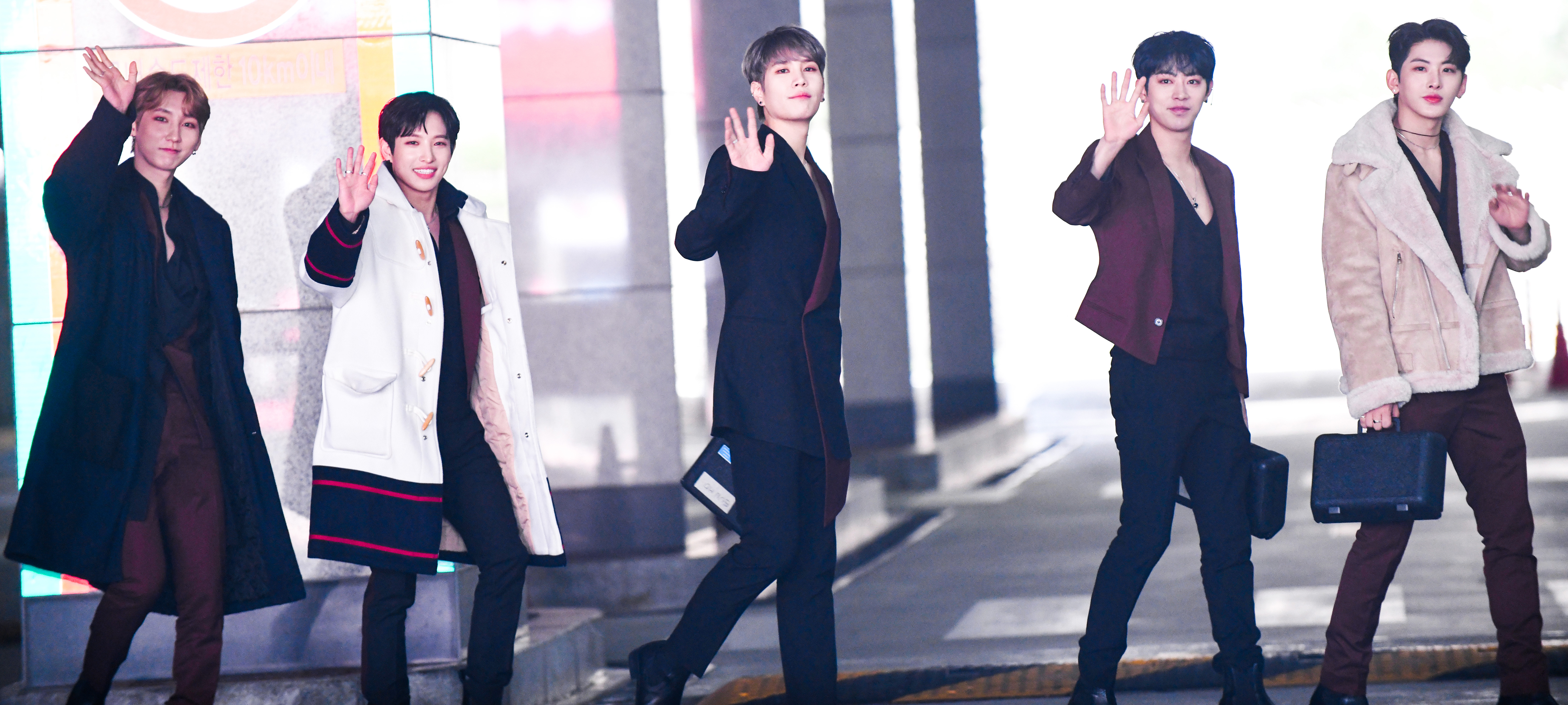
- UNVS at the MBC Dream Center, March 21 2020; from left: Jen, Changgyu, Eunho, Jun H., YY

Background information
- Also known as: Universe 世界少年
- Origin: Seoul, South Korea
- Genres: K-pop
- Years active: 2016–2022
- Label: Chitwn Music
- Members: Jun H.; YY; Eunho; Changgyu; Jen
- Past members: IL; Minho; Sihoon
- Website: chitwnmusic.com

UNVS (Korean: 유엔브이에스; Chinese: UNIVERSE 世界少年) is a boy band based in South Korea. Originally consisting of Sihoon, IL, Changgong, Yongyong, and Minho, the quintet debuted in Taiwan, where they released the digital singles "Uni-verse" and "Hacker" in 2016 and 2017, respectively. UNVS signed with Chitwn Music in its home country with founding members Changgyu (formerly Changgong) and YY (Yongyong), and new additions Jun H., Eunho, and Jen. They released their debut single album Debut Single: Timeless and its lead single "Timeless" domestically on February 23, 2020.

== History ==
Universe (UNVS), which also serves as a portmanteau of "unique" and "verse", was formed in South Korea and managed by Media Asia Music. They decided on the name in hopes of having "universal appeal" and becoming a "pop group beloved by the people". The initial lineup compromised South Korean leader and main vocalist Sihoon, vocalist Changgong, and dancer Minho, as well as Chinese rapper IL and vocalist Yongyong; the quintet trained together for one year. UNVS spent the first three months of their career in Taiwan to establish a following of Chinese speakers. Their first single "Uni-verse" was written by lyricist Francis Lee and digitally released on December 21, 2016. UNVS became the first Korean idol group to make their debut in the country. They released their second single "Hacker" on January 1, 2017. UNVS departed from Taiwan two months later and were scheduled to debut in their home country and Japan later that year.

Leader and rapper Jun H., main vocalist Eunho, and rapper Jen joined UNVS alongside YY (formerly Yongyong) and Changgyu (Changgong). The new lineup trained together for two years. They signed with Chitwn Music in South Korea and the company introduced the group by publishing a promotional poster on February 9, 2020. SBS MTV rebooted its television series Rookie King after seven years and began airing episodes on February 20. It featured the quintet in midst of their domestic debut. UNVS released their debut single album Debut Single: Timeless and its lead single "Timeless" on February 23, 2020. In response to the decision of South Korea's government to upgrade the alert level to its highest amidst the coronavirus pandemic, the record label followed the recommendation to avoid gathering people and canceled UNVS's scheduled showcase for reporters the following day; the event was live streamed without an audience instead. UNVS began performing "Timeless" on weekly music programs on February 25. From April 8, they promoted the followup track "Solar Eclipse". Rookie King aired episode 14 two days later, the final with the group in the series. UNVS released their second single album Soundtracks for the Lost & Broken : Give You Up and the pop-EDM track "Give You Up" on May 15.

== Members ==
List of members and roles.

- Jun H. (준현) – leader, rap
- YY (와이와이) – vocals
- Eunho (은호) – main vocals
- Changgyu (창규) – vocals
- Jen (젠) – rap

Former members

- IL (아이엘) – rap
- Minho (민호) – dance
- Sihoon (시훈) – leader, main vocals

== Discography ==
=== Single albums ===
Title	Album details	Peak positions	Sales
Title	Album details	KOR	Sales
Debut Single: Timeless	Released: February 23, 2020; Label: Chitwn, Genie; Formats: CD, digital download	68	KOR: 972
Soundtracks for the Lost & Broken : Give You Up	Released: May 15, 2020; Label: Chitwn, Genie; Formats: Digital download	—	

=== Singles ===
Title	Year	Album
Taiwan
"Uni-verse" (你的名字是我唯一的詩)	2016	I'll Be Here
"Hacker"	2017	Hacking the Universe
South Korea
"Timeless"	2020	Debut Single: Timeless
"Solar Eclipse" (절대 모를거야; Jeoldae Moreulgeoya) (featuring room102)	2020	Debut Single: Timeless
"Give You Up"	2020	Soundtracks for the Lost & Broken : Give You Up
"Sand Castle"	2020	Sand Castle
"The Prologue"	2020	The Prologue

== Filmography ==
Television series
Title	Network	Year	Role	Notes	Ref.
Rookie King UNVS	SBS MTV	2020	Themselves	14 episodes	
