= Autumn Vacation =

South Korean indie pop band

- Origin: Seoul, South Korea
- Genres: Indie rock; indie pop
- Years active: 2009-2021
- Labels: Your Summer
- Past members: Bobby Chung; Gyepy

Autumn Vacation (Korean: 가을방학; RR: Gaeul banghak) is a South Korean indie pop duo. The band consists of Bobby Chung and Gyepy. The band was formed in 2009, and released four studio albums: Autumn Vacation (가을방학) (2010), Clarity (선명) (2013), The Third Season (세번째 계절) (2015) and The World Is Like a Handkerchief (세상은 한 장의 손수건) (2020). Due to rumours of Bobby Chung's sexual assault in 2020, the band decided that it was no longer possible to be active, and announced their dissolution in 2021.

== Career ==
Autumn Vacation was formed in 2009, Bobby Chung is a former member of Onnine Ibalgwan and Julia Hart, and Gyepy is a former member of Broccoli, You Too?. Gyepy was a fan of Julia Hart, and a duo was formed when Bobby Chung offered her a demo recording. They released their first studio album Autumn Vacation (가을방학) in 2010. The albums sold nearly 20,000 copies. They performed on Inkigayo in March 2013.

They released their second studio album Clarity (선명) in 2013 and had a solo concert in December. They released their third studio album The Third Season (세번째 계절). Music critic Kim Jakka said the album as "The album is far from mannerism. It's a mediocre but unachievable result of doing what you're good at and what you haven't done before." The album was nominated for Best Pop Album at the 2016 Korean Music Awards.

In 2017, the band released a compilation album Heart Collection (마음집), collecting the singles they have released so far. In 2020, they released their fourth studio album The World Is Like a Handkerchief (세상은 한 장의 손수건). Music critic Seojeongmingab described the album as "a piece of sugar-coated music with such small fun."

In late 2020, member Bobby Chung was investigated by police for assaulting a woman and illegally filming sexual videos. He has denied the allegations. The band decided that it would be difficult to work in the future, and announced its disbandment in March 2021. Their label Your Summer described the breakup as a "personal reasons." Member Gyepy said about the disbandment, "I hope that Autumn VVacation can be a precious memory for you even in the distant future."

== Discography ==
=== Studio albums ===
- Autumn Vacation (가을방학) (2010)
- Clarity (선명) (2013)
- The Third Season (세번째 계절) (2015)
- The World Is Like a Handkerchief (세상은 한 장의 손수건) (2020)

=== EPs ===
- Indoor Music Outing (실내악 외출) (2012) (with Kim Jaehoon)

=== Compilation albums ===
- Heart Collection (마음집) (2017)
