= Pink Fantasy =

2018–2023 South Korean girl group

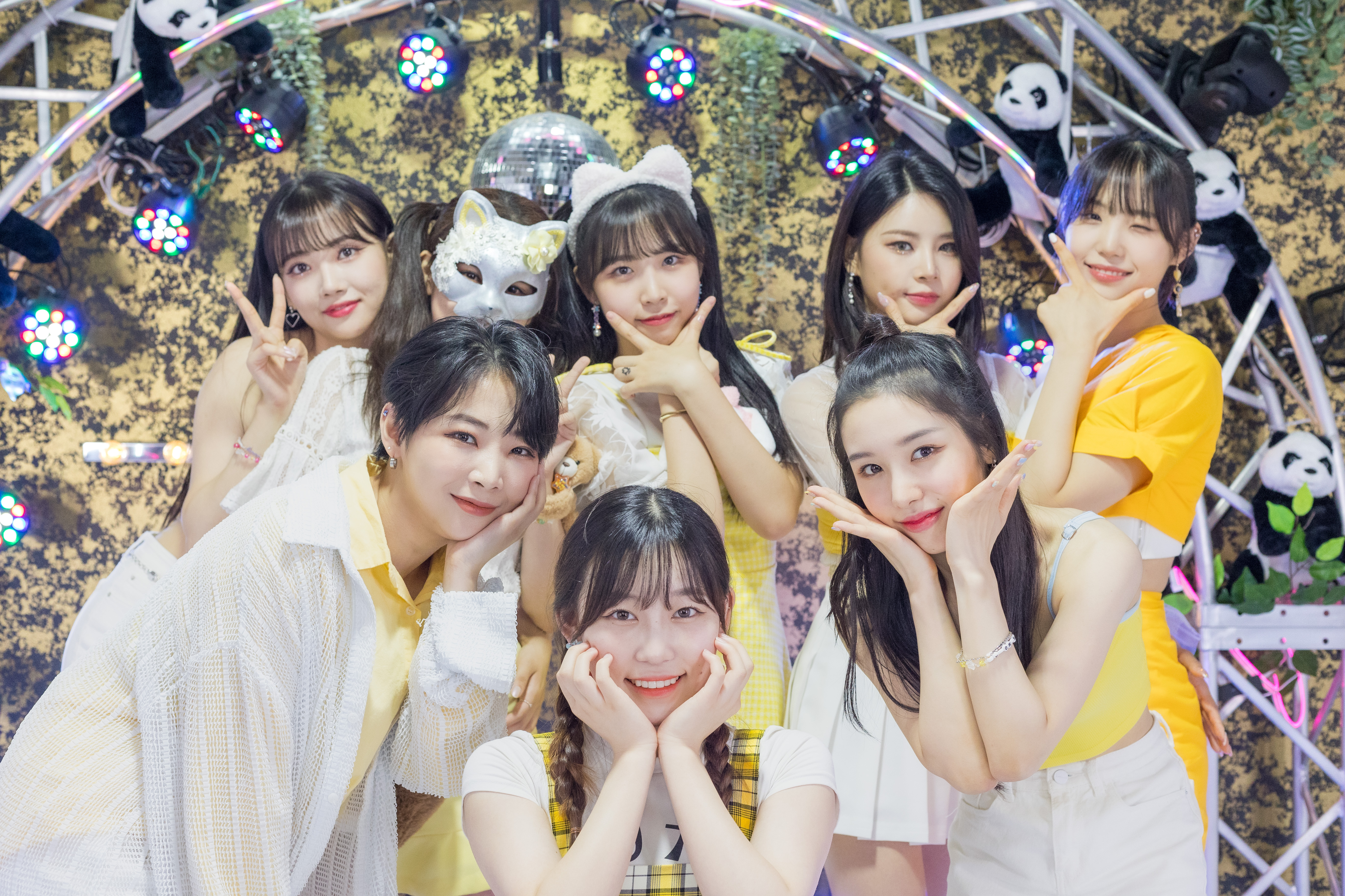
- PinkFantasy in July 2022

Background information
- Origin: Seoul, South Korea
- Genre: K-Pop
- Years active: 2018–2024
- Labels: Play Maker E&M
- Spinoffs: PinkFantasy SHY; MMD; PinkFantasy Shadow; PF Amomi
- Past members: Aini; SangA; Yubeen; Yechan; Harin; Daewang; SeeA; Heesun; Momoka; Arang; Miku; Miu

Pink Fantasy (Korean: 핑크판타지, Japanese: ピンクファンタジ, often stylized as PinkFantasy) was a South Korean group originally consisting of: Daewang, Aini, SeeA, Yechan, Harin, Arang, Heesun and Yubeen. The group had undergone several lineup changes with their final lineup consisting of Momoka, Arang, and Miku. Originally, the group had a member named Rai however she left before the group's debut, making her a pre-debut member. Throughout the years, members SangA, Momoka, Miku, and Miu joined the group. The group debuted on October 24, 2018, with the single "Iriwa", which was released along with a music video, directed by Super Junior's Shindong. The group had several sub-units. The group is unique in that member Daewang's real identity is completely hidden, with her wearing a mask to hide her face. The group disbanded on July 5, 2024.

== History ==
=== Pre-debut ===
Prior to debut, several of the group's members had experience in the music industry. Aini had previously debuted in the groups Kirots and UNIZ, SeeA was previously a member of the group Piggy Dolls, Yechan was a member of Awe5ome Baby and Rai (predebut member) was in the Japanese-Taiwanese group Weather Girls under the stage name "Sindy". Yubeen was a contestant on Idol School under her real name Cho Yubin.

Additionally, the group's first sub-unit "Sugar Powder" was formed predebut, consisting of Harin, Arang and Heesun. This unit was purely promotional and never released any songs.

=== 2018: Debut ===
The group made their official debut on October 24, 2018, with the single "Iriwa", accompanied by a music video. The music video features predebut member Rai, who left shortly before debut and was replaced by Yubeen. While Yubeen does not feature in the music video, the song was re-recorded to feature her instead of Rai.

=== 2019: Further releases, sub-units and lineup changes ===
On March 3, the group's first official sub-unit was announced called "Pink Fantasy SHY". This unit consisted of members SeeA, Yubeen and Harin. They debuted on March 26, 2019, with the single "12 o'clock".

On May 28, 2019, they made their Japanese debut with the Japanese version of their debut single "Iriwa".

In June 2019, Yubeen went on hiatus due to a panic disorder.

On July 15, 2019, the teaser schedule was released for their first comeback "Fantasy", to be released in August. On July 18 the addition of SangA was announced, making them a nine member group. Yubeen did not take part in this comeback due to her hiatus. Fantasy was released on August 5, 2019.

On October 18, 2019, MyDoll announced that Heesun had left Pink Fantasy and would halt all her activities that same day, However, she would still remain under the company.

On November 1, 2019, they released a third single titled "Playing House". The music video was released on November 9, 2019

On December 17, 2019, the group's second official subunit "MDD" was formed, consisting of Yechan and Yubeen. They debuted with the single "Not Beautiful" on December 19, 2019.

=== 2020: Further lineup changes, Pink Fantasy Shadow and guest members ===
On April 12, 2020, it was announced Aini had left the group due to symptoms of Plantar Fasciitis and decreased physical strength. However, she would remain under MyDoll Entertainment as a model.

On June 19, 2020, a teaser for the single "Shadow Play" was posted on the group's official Twitter account, indicating a release date in July. It was announced that this single would technically be a song under the new sub-unit Pink Fantasy Shadow, but would be promoted as a regular Pink Fantasy song to avoid confusing broadcasting stations and to bring awareness to the group as a whole. Shadow Play was released on July 14, 2020, the sub-unit consisting of SeeA, SangA, Harin and Arang.

Before the release of Shadow Play, it was announced on June 28 that Yubeen had left the group due to her panic disorder, however, she would remain under MyDoll Entertainment.

On October 21, 2020, MyDoll announced that SangA had left the group after requesting her contract be terminated for personal reasons.

On December 30, 2020, MyDoll announced that former member Heesun and MyDoll trainees Momoka, Miu and Miku would join the group as guest members for their 2021 comeback.

=== 2021: "Lemon Candy", new members, Alice In Wonderland, Tales of the Unusual, and Merry Fantasy ===
On January 21, 2021, they released the digital single "Lemon Candy", featuring former member Heesun as a guest member.

In May 2021, it was announced that, in addition to Heesun, two more new members would join as guest members of Pink Fantasy. On May 13, during the "Pink Pick PinkFantasy Fanmeeting" they would be revealed as Momoka and Miku.

On June 6, 2021, the June 21 release of their song "Poison" was announced through the group's social networks. The next day, two concept photos for this comeback were released, and the group's first EP album, "Alice in Wonderland" was announced, with its release set for the same day. On June 13, with a dance intro for "Alice in Darkland" a teaser of the group's first mini album was released, specifying that it would be the fourth song on the EP. On June 21, the EP "Alice In Wonderland" was released along with the music video for "Poison".

On October 28, 2021, it was announced through social media and news sites, the single "기기괴괴 (Tales Of The Unusual)" as the original soundtrack of Oh Seong-dae's NAVER webtoon under the same name, set to release October 31. Additionally, it was reported that members Daewang, SeeA and Yechan were lyricists on that song. On October 31, a teaser video was released on social media, revealing two songs that would make up the EP "기기괴괴", being "기기괴괴 (Tales Of The Unusual)", sung by the whole group, and "Rain", a solo ballad song performed by member Yechan. On the same day at 18:00 KST, it was released on various streaming services along with the respective music video on YouTube for the eponymous song.

On December 7, the cover art of their new digital single "Merry Fantasy" was uploaded to the group's official social media account, and the release was revealed to be on December 10. It's Pink Fantasy's first Christmas song, and members Harin, Heesun and Momoka participated as lyricists. Korean music streaming services, such as Melon and Genie, describe the song as "a cute carol song, made based on the Christmas memories of Pink Fantasy members".

On December 24, the song "숨은 그대 찾기", a collaboration of member SeeA, along with two MustB members (Taegeon and Wooyeon), was released. This release was part of a project created by K-Stage, a concert-like event produced by music distributor and music artist management company, Naturally Music.

On December 26, through their Daum fancafe and the group's other social network accounts it was announced that the previously invited member Momoka will become an official permanent member from now on.

=== 2022: LUV Is True, Tales of the Unusual (Feedback Version), Bizarre Story: Get Out ===
On February 8, 2022, the release of "LUV Is True", a song dedicated to LUVIT, the group's fandom, was announced, expressing gratitude to the fans through the lyrics. A pre-release as NFT was scheduled for February 14, through NFTs music production company, 3PM, at while its official release was set for March 14. The said NFT company, showing concern for the environment, said that this NFT will be produced based on a Polygon blockchain that emits carbon at less than 1% of Ethereum's existing emission.

On April 1, the music video for the feedback version of "Tales of the Unusual", a song previously released in October 2021, was released through the group's YouTube channel, in response to the comments from netizens, differing from the original version mainly by the removal of the additional voice of Hyuk Jooni, who joined in by repeating the song title in the chorus, leaving only the voices of PinkFantasy members. On April 8, this version was released through music streaming services.

On September 16, PinkFantasy staff announced that Daewang and SeeA would not participate in their new song due to SeeA's injury and Daewang focusing on producing the song.

On September 30, it was announced that PinkFantasy's comeback, Bizarre Story, will release on October 24. "Bizarre Story: Get Out" was released with two tracks and an instrumental.

=== 2023: Members graduation and group hiatus ===
Harin and Yechan graduated from the group on November 8, 2023. In late 2023, it was announced that Pink Fantasy would be going on an indefinite hiatus at the beginning of 2024. The final activities for the group was on December 27, 2023 and on January 1, 2024 the group entered an indefinite hiatus.

=== 2024: Hiatus and disbandment ===
On January 1, 2024, the group went on an indefinite hiatus, and suspended group activities. SeeA left Mydoll entertainment on May 21, 2024. Heesun, Daewang, and SeeA left the group to focus on individual activities. MyDoll entertainment changed their name to Play Maker E&M Incorporated in June 2024. Later, Heesun, Arang, and Harin were added to Play Maker E&M's new project group, I:Z. They are also part of project group ToTh6y, along with Wonsik and Seunghyuk of TMC, created by Daewang. Pink Fantasy officially disbanded on July 5, 2024, as all members wanted to do different activities. On August 29, Pink Fantasy released an unreleased song titled "Venn Diagram."

== Members ==
=== Former ===
- Aini (아이니)
- SangA (상아)
- Yubeen (유빈)
- Momoka (모모카)
- Arang (아랑)
- Miku (미쿠)
- Yechan (예찬)
- Harin (하린)
- Daewang (대왕)
- SeeA (시아)
- Heesun (희선)

=== Sub-units ===
- Sugar Powder: Harin, Arang, Heesun
- Shy: SeeA, Harin, Yubeen
- MDD: Yechan, Yubeen
- Shadow: SeeA, SangA, Harin, Arang

== Discography ==
=== Single albums ===
Title	Album details	Peak chart positions	Sales
Title	Album details	KOR	Sales
Fantasy	Released: August 5, 2019; Label: MyDoll Entertainment; Format: CD, digital download	—	
Shadow Play	Released: July 14, 2020; Label: MyDoll Entertainment; Format: CD, digital download	43	KOR: 1,836
Bizarre Story (기괴한 이야기)	Released: October 24, 2022; Label: MyDoll Entertainment; Format: CD, digital download	98	KOR: 604

=== Extended plays ===
Title	Album details	Peak chart positions	Sales
Title	Album details	KOR	Sales
Alice in Wonderland	Released: June 21, 2021; Label: MyDoll Entertainment; Format: CD, digital download	39	

=== Singles ===
Title	Year	Peak chart positions	Album
Title	Year	KOR DL	Album
"Iriwa" (이리와)	2018	—	Non-album single
"Fantasy"	2019	—	Fantasy
"Playing House" (소꿉장난)	2019	—	Non-album single
"Shadow Play" (그림자)	2020	—	Shadow Play
"Lemon Candy" (레몬사탕)	2021	—	Non-album single
"Poison" (독)	2021	193	Alice in Wonderland
"Tales of the Unusual (기기괴괴)	2021	—	Non-album singles
"Merry Fantasy"	2021	—	Non-album singles
"Luv Is True (Luv.i.t)"	2022	—	Non-album singles
"Bizarre Story: Get Out" (기괴한 이야기: Get Out)	2022	—	Bizarre Story
"Venn Diagram"	2024	—	Non-album single
"—" denotes releases that did not chart or were not released in that region.

== Videography ==
Music Videos
Year	Music Video	Directed by	Choreography	Note	Ref.
2018	이리와 (Iriwa)	Walala Crew (Shindong)	-		
2019	12 o'clock	Walala Crew (Shindong)	Peacock, Moontrue	PinkFantasy SHY	
2019	Fantasy	Walala Crew (Shindong)	Peacock, Moontrue		
2019	소꿉장난 (Playing House)	ARTBEAT (Kim Jun-seok)	Peacock, Moontrue		
2019	아름답지 않아 (Not Beautiful)	Walala Crew (Shindong)	-	PinkFantasy MDD	
2020	그림자 (Shadow Play)	Walala Crew (Shindong), ZanyBros (Lee Hae-jin)	MOTF (Park Hae-ri, Kim Beom)	PinkFantasy Shadow	
2021	Lemon Candy	PinkFantasy (Daewang), mcmkd	MOTF (Park Hae-ri, Kim Beom)		
2021	독 (Poison)	ZanyBros (Sim Ji-hyeong)	MOTF (Park Hae-ri, Kim Beom)		
2021	기기괴괴 (Tales Of The Unusual)	Walala Crew (Shindong)	MOTF (Park Hae-ri, Kim Beom)		
2022	기괴한 이야기: Get out	PinkFantasy (Daewang)	MOTF (Park Hae-ri, Kim Beom)		
2022	기괴한 이야기: The Game	PinkFantasy (Daewang)	Jung Geonyoung		

== Tours ==
=== PinkFantasy Latin Tour ===
- February 14 - Mexico
- February 16 - Colombia
- February 19 - Paraguay
- February 21 - Uruguay
- February 23 - Argentina

The tour was suspended due to the COVID-19 pandemic.
