= Fame (EP) =

EP by Han Seung-woo
- Released: August 10, 2020
- Genre: K-pop; R&B; trap
- Language: Korean; English
- Label: Play M

Han Seung-woo chronology
Fame (2020)	Fade (2021)

Singles from Fame
- 1. "Sacrifice" Released: August 10, 2020

Fame is the debut extended play by the South Korean singer Han Seung-woo. It was released on August 10, 2020, by Play M Entertainment.

== Background and release ==
Han Seung-woo was announced to be preparing a solo album in June 2020. Han is the first member of Victon to make a solo debut.

Han was the lyricist for all the songs on the album and participated in composing several of the songs.

The physical album was released in three versions.

== Critical reception ==
The lead single "Sacrifice" was described as combining "dark synth, trap and R&B with Seungwoo’s soaring vocals for a dynamic and emotional effect", as well as having "impressive vocal ad-libs and runs" with "powerful bursts of rap".

== Commercial performance ==
The album debuted at number two on the weekly Gaon Album Chart, and the title track "Sacrifice" debuted at number 97 on the weekly Gaon Digital Chart and at number one on the component Gaon Download Chart. The EP sold more than 30,000 copies domestically in its first day of sales. At the end of 2020, the album had sold 86,063 copies in South Korea.

== Track listing ==
Credits adapted from Melon.

No.	Title	Lyrics	Music	Arrangement	Length
1.	"Fever"	Han Seung-woo; JinbyJin	Han Seung-woo; JinbyJin	JinbyJin	3:18
2.	"Sacrifice"	Han Seung-woo	JinbyJin; Jakob Mihoubi; Rudi Daouk	JinbyJin	3:14
3.	"Reply" (답장해)	Han Seung-woo	Han Seung-woo; Raudi	Raudi	3:27
4.	"I Just Want Love" (원해)	Han Seung-woo	MonoTree; 153/Joombas	MonoTree	2:59
5.	"Forest"	Han Seung-woo	Han Seung-woo; Primeboi	Primeboi; Opendoor	3:32
6.	"Child" (철부지)	Han Seung-woo	KZ; Kim Hye-kwang; FEB; Taeyoung Kim	KZ; Taeyoung Kim	3:25

== Charts ==
=== Album ===
==== Weekly charts ====
Chart (2020)	Peak position
South Korean Albums (Gaon)	2

==== Monthly chart ====
Chart (2020)	Peak position
South Korean Albums (Gaon)	8

==== Year-end chart ====
Chart (2020)	Position
South Korean Albums (Gaon)	94

=== Songs ===
==== Weekly charts ====
Chart performance for "Sacrifice"
Chart (2020)	Peak position
South Korea (Gaon)	97
