= We Can (EP) =

- Digital and "Orb" version cover

EP by Weeekly
- Released: October 13, 2020
- Genre: K-pop; dance-pop
- Length: 16:07
- Language: Korean
- Label: Play M; Kakao M

Weeekly chronology
We Are (2020)	We Can (2020)	We Play (2021)

Singles from We Can
- 1. "Zig Zag" Released: October 13, 2020

We Can is the second extended play by South Korean girl group Weeekly. It was released on October 13, 2020, by Play M and distributed by Kakao M. The physical version of the EP was made available in two versions: "Orb" and "Wave". It contains five tracks, including the lead single "Zig Zag".

== Background and release ==
On September 21, 2020, Play M Entertainment released a teaser photo and announced that Weeekly would make a comeback with their second EP We Can.

On September 25, they released the first set of concept photos for We Can. On September 29, they released the second set of concept photos for We Can. Six days later, on October 5, the tracklist for We Can was released. It also revealed "Zig Zag" as the lead single. On October 7, the highlight medley for We Can was released. On October 9, the music video teaser for "Zig Zag" was released.

On October 13, We Can and the music video for "Zig Zag" was released.

== Promotion ==
At the same day as the EP release, on October 13, they had an online media showcase.

They promoted the single "Zig Zag" at Mnet's M Countdown, Arirang TV's Simply K-Pop, KBS2's Music Bank, MBC's Show! Music Core, SBS's Inkigayo and SBS MTV's The Show.

== Track listing ==
Credits adapted from Melon.

No.	Title	Lyrics	Music	Arrangement	Length
1.	"Unnie" (언니; eonni [lit. "Sister"])	Lee Seu-ran	VINCENZO; Fuxxy; Any Masingga; Anna Timgren	VINCENZO; Fuxxy	3:13
2.	"My Earth"	Jiyoon (Weeekly)	Jiyoon (Weeekly); BlueRhythm	BlueRhythm	3:19
3.	"Zig Zag"	Lee Seu-ran; danke	Moon Kim (153/Joombas); STAINBOYS; Kim Jeong-woo	STAINBOYS	3:17
4.	"Top Secret" (몰래몰래; mollaemollae [lit. "Secret secret"])	Lee Seu-ran	Peter Wallevik; Daniel Davidsen; Sam Hockings; Dawn Elektra	PhD	3:07
5.	"Weeekly" (월화수목금토일; weolhwasumokgeumtoil [lit. "MonTueWedThuFriSatSun"])	Jiyoon (Weeekly)	Kim Chang-rak (AIMING); Kim Su-bin (AIMING); Jo Se-hee (AIMING); Forever Noh	Kim Su-bin (AIMING); Jo Se-hee (AIMING); Chae Gang-hae (AIMING)	3:01
Total length:					16:21

== Accolades ==
Year-end lists
Publisher	Year	Listicle	Work	Rank	Ref.
MTV	2020	The Best K-Pop B-Sides of 2020	"Top Secret"	23	
Metro	2020	The Best K-Pop Comebacks of 2020	"Zig Zag"	16	

== Charts ==
Weekly sales chart performance for We Can
Chart (2020)	Peak position
South Korean Albums (Gaon)	10

Monthly sales chart performance for We Can
Chart (2020)	Peak position
South Korean Albums (Gaon)	24

== Release history ==
Region	Date	Format	Label
South Korea	October 13, 2020	CD; digital download; streaming	Play M, Kakao M
Various	October 13, 2020	Digital download; streaming	Play M, Kakao M
