= Rocket Punch =

South Korean girl group (2019–2024)

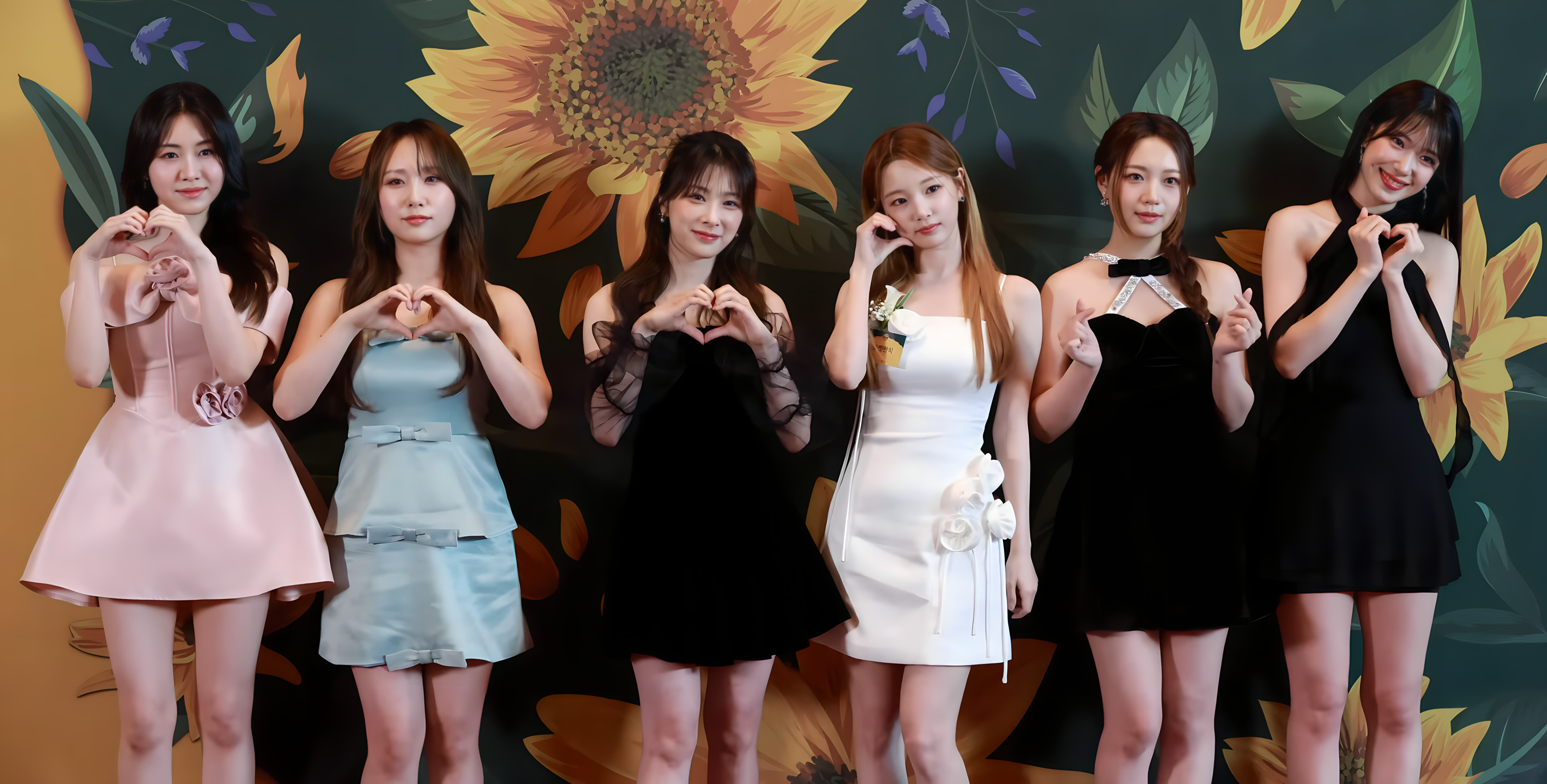
- Rocket Punch in May 2024; From left to right: Dahyun, Juri, Yunkyoung, Yeonhee, Sohee, Suyun

Background information
- Origin: Seoul, South Korea
- Genre: K-pop
- Years active: 2019–2024
- Labels: Woollim; Yoshimoto Kogyo
- Past members: Juri; Yeonhee; Suyun; Yunkyoung; Sohee; Dahyun
- Website: woolliment.com/arsits/rocket-punch

Rocket Punch (Korean: 로켓펀치; Japanese: ロケットパンチ or as RCPC) was a South Korean girl group formed and managed by Woollim Entertainment in 2019. The group consisted of six members: Juri, Yeonhee, Suyun, Yunkyoung, Sohee, and Dahyun. They debuted on August 7, 2019, with the extended play (EP) Pink Punch. Juri departed from the group on May 24, 2024, after her contract with Woollim expired. Yeonhee, Yunkyoung, Sohee, and Dahyun left on December 31, 2024, due to their contracts also expiring.

== History ==
=== Pre-debut ===
Juri was cast as an AKB48 12th-generation trainee through an audition in 2011. She was introduced to the public through AKB48 Team 4 in March 2012. Her first television appearance in Korea was in the 2018 reality competition show, Produce 48. Suyun and Sohee were introduced to the public as representative trainees of Woollim Entertainment through Produce 48 as well. In March 2019, Juri was confirmed to have signed with Woollim Entertainment to pursue her career in Korea by debuting as a member of the company's new girl group. Two months later, Juri officially graduated from AKB48.

=== 2019–2020: Introduction, debut with Pink Punch, continues with Red Punch and Blue Punch ===
On July 22, Woollim Entertainment revealed a motion clip with Rocket Punch's logo and speculated as the next girl group after Lovelyz. It was later confirmed with a concept film featuring all six members (Yeonhee, Juri, Suyun, Yunkyung, Sohee, and Dahyun) which was released on July 23.

Rocket Punch's debut EP Pink Punch was released on August 7, 2019, with "Bim Bam Bum" serving as its lead single. A debut showcase was held in Yes24 Live Hall in Seoul, South Korea, following the release of their EP. The group held their first performance in Japan at the 2019 Girls Award Autumn/Winter Show.

On February 10, 2020, The group made their comeback with their second EP Red Punch and its lead single "Bouncy". On August 4, the group released their third EP Blue Punch, and its lead single "Juicy".

=== 2021–2022: Ring Ring, Japanese debut, Yellow Punch and Flash ===
On May 17, 2021, Rocket Punch released their first single album Ring Ring, and its lead single of the same name. The acoustic version of their lead single was released on July 15. On May 24, Woollim Entertainment announced that Rocket Punch would be making their Japanese debut under Yoshimoto Kogyo. They released their first Japanese EP Bubble Up! on August 4, with its lead title track of the same name being released on July 13.

On February 28, 2022, the group released their fourth EP Yellow Punch, with the lead single "Chiquita". On March 11, Woollim Entertainment confirmed that Rocket Punch will hold both online and offline fan meetings which will be held on April 2 and 3, 2022. On June 29, the group released the Japanese single "Fiore". The group released their second single album Flash on August 29, 2022.

=== 2023–2024: Queendom Puzzle and departure from Woolim Entertainment ===
On May 26, 2023, members Juri, Yeonhee and Suyun were revealed as contestants on Mnet's new survival show Queendom Puzzle. On August 15, during the show's finale, member Yeonhee finished in 6th place, placing her in the line-up of the supergroup El7z Up. The remaining members, Juri and Suyun, finished in 12th and 8th place respectively. On September 6, the group released their third single album Boom along with the title track of the same name.

On May 24, 2024, Woollim announced Juri's departure from the group following the expiration of her exclusive contract with the company. On December 27, Woolim announced that the exclusive contract of members Yeonhee, Yunkyung, Sohee, and Dahyun would end on December 31 and the group would disband. Suyun would later leave Woollim in August 2026.

== Members ==
=== Former ===
- Juri Takahashi (高橋 朱里; 타카하시 쥬리)
- Kim Yeon-hee (김연희)
- Kim Su-yun (김수윤)
- Seo Yun-kyoung (서윤경)
- Kim So-hee (김소희)
- Jeong Da-hyun (정다현)

== Discography ==
=== Studio albums ===
List of studio albums, with selected details, chart positions and sales
Title	Details	Peak chart positions	Sales
Title	Details	JPN	Sales
Doki Doki Love	Released: October 5, 2022; Label: Yoshimoto Kogyo; Formats: CD, digital download, streaming; Track listing: 1. "Bubble up!" 2. "Doki Doki Love" (ドキドキLove); 3. "Jolly Jolly"; 4. "Pitapa" (ピタパ); 5. "Let's Dance"; 6. "Fiore"; 7. "Wonderland"; 8. "Bim Bam Bum" (Japanese ver.); 9. "Bouncy" (Japanese ver.); 10. "Ring Ring" (Japanese ver.)	25	JPN: 1,689

=== Extended plays ===
==== Korean extended plays ====
List of Korean extended plays, with selected details, chart positions and sales
Title	Details	Peak chart positions	Sales
Title	Details	KOR	Sales
Pink Punch	Released: August 7, 2019; Label: Woollim Entertainment; Formats: CD, digital download, streaming	6	KOR: 18,561
Red Punch	Released: February 10, 2020; Label: Woollim Entertainment; Formats: CD, digital download, streaming	4	KOR: 12,583
Blue Punch	Released: August 4, 2020; Label: Woollim Entertainment; Formats: CD, digital download, streaming	6	KOR: 24,184
Yellow Punch	Released: February 28, 2022; Label: Woollim Entertainment; Formats: CD, digital download, streaming; Track listing: 1. "Yellow Punch"; 2. "Chiquita"; 3. "In My World" (주인공); 4. "Red Balloon" (덤덤); 5. "Love More" (어제, 오늘 내일보다 더); 6. "Louder"	9	KOR: 20,665

==== Japanese extended plays ====
List of Japanese extended plays, with selected details, chart positions and sales
Title	Details	Peak chart positions	Sales
Title	Details	JPN	Sales
Bubble Up!	Released: August 4, 2021; Label: Yoshimoto Kogyo; Formats: CD, digital download, streaming; Track listing: 1. "Bubble Up!"; 2. "Overture"; 3. "Jolly Jolly"; 4. "Summer Days"; 5. "Let's Dance"; 6. "Bim Bam Bum" (Japanese ver.)	19	JPN: 4,927

=== Single albums ===
List of single albums, with selected details and chart positions
Title	Details	Peak chart positions	Sales
Title	Details	KOR	Sales
Ring Ring	Released: May 17, 2021; Label: Woollim Entertainment; Formats: CD, digital download, streaming; Track listing: 1. "Ring Ring"; 2. "I Want U Bad"; 3. "Ride"	14	KOR: 26,685
Flash	Released: August 29, 2022; Label: Woollim Entertainment; Formats: CD, digital download, streaming; Track listing: 1. "Flash"; 2. "Moon Prism"; 3. "Beep Beep"	10	KOR: 26,574
Boom	Released: September 6, 2023; Label: Woollim Entertainment; Formats: CD, digital download, streaming; Track listing: 1. "Boom"; 2. "Alive"; 3. "Give Me Your Heart"	12	KOR: 25,002

=== Singles ===
==== Korean singles ====
List of Korean singles, with selected details, chart positions and sales
Title	Year	Peak chart positions			Album
Title	Year	KOR DL	KOR Hot	US World	Album
"Bim Bam Bum" (빔밤붐)	2019	95	—	—	Pink Punch
"Bouncy"	2020	88	97	—	Red Punch
"Juicy"	2020	126	—	—	Blue Punch
"Ring Ring"	2021	18	—	17	Ring Ring
"Ring Ring" (acoustic ver.)	2021	119	—	—	Non-album single
"Chiquita"	2022	8	—	—	Yellow Punch
"Flash"	2022	13	*	—	Flash
"Boom"	2023	26	*	—	Boom
"—" denotes items that did not chart or were not released. "*" denotes a chart did not exist at that time.

==== Japanese singles ====
List of Japanese singles, with selected details, chart positions and sales
Title	Year	Peak chart positions	Sales	Album
Title	Year	JPN	Sales	Album
"Bubble Up!"	2021	—	—N/a	Bubble Up!
"Fiore"	2022	24	JPN: 2,616 (phy.)	Doki Doki Love
"Doki Doki Love"	2022	—	—N/a	Doki Doki Love
"—" denotes items that did not chart or were not released.

=== Soundtrack appearances ===
List of soundtrack appearances, showing year released, and name of the album
Title	Year	Album
"Paradise"	2023	Secret Playlist OST

=== Other charted songs ===
Title	Year	Peak chart positions	Album
Title	Year	KOR DL	Album
"Ride"	2021	110	Ring Ring
"I Want U Bad"	2021	116	Ring Ring
"In My World"	2022	144	Yellow Punch
"덤덤 (Red Balloon)"	2022	183	Yellow Punch
"Louder"	2022	184	Yellow Punch
"어제, 오늘 내일보다 더"	2022	185	Yellow Punch
"Moon Prism"	2022	112	Flash
"Beep Beep"	2022	118	Flash
"Give Me Your Heart"	2023	160	Boom
"Alive"	2023	171	Boom

=== Music videos ===
Year	Title	Album	Director(s)	Ref.
2019	"Bim Bam Bum"	Pink Punch	Zanybros	
2020	"Bouncy"	Red Punch	Zanybros	
2020	"Juicy"	Blue Punch	96wave	
2021	"Ring Ring"	Ring Ring	Zanybros	
2021	"Ring Ring (Acoustic Ver.)"	Non-album single	Unknown	
2021	"Bubble Up!"	Bubble Up!	Wonki Hong (Zanybros)	
2022	"Chiquita"	Yellow Punch	Shin Hee-won (ST-WT)	
2022	"Flash"	Flash	Sunny Visual	
2022	"Fiore"	Doki Doki Love	Unknown	
2022	"Doki Doki Love"	Doki Doki Love	Zanybros	
2023	"Boom"	Boom	Lee Ki-seok ( ZanyLayerZ)	

== Awards and nominations ==
Name of the award ceremony, year presented, category, nominee of the award, and the result of the nomination
Award ceremony	Year	Nominee / work	Category	Result	Ref.
Brand of the Year Awards	2021	Rocket Punch	Rising Star - Female Idol	Nominated	
Korean Culture Entertainment Awards	2020	Rocket Punch	K-Pop Singer Award	Won	
Mnet Asian Music Awards	2019	Rocket Punch	Artist of the Year	Nominated	
Mnet Asian Music Awards	2019	Rocket Punch	Best New Female Artist	Nominated	
Mnet Asian Music Awards	2019	Rocket Punch	Worldwide Fans' Choice Top 10	Nominated	
Mnet Asian Music Awards	2019	Rocket Punch	2019 Favorite Female Artist	Nominated	
Seoul Music Awards	2020	Rocket Punch	New Artist Award	Nominated	
Seoul Music Awards	2020	Rocket Punch	Popularity Award	Nominated	
Seoul Music Awards	2020	Rocket Punch	Hallyu Special Award	Nominated	
Seoul Music Awards	2020	Rocket Punch	QQ Music Most Popular K-Pop Artist Award	Nominated	
