= Juri Takahashi =

Japanese singer

- 高橋 朱里
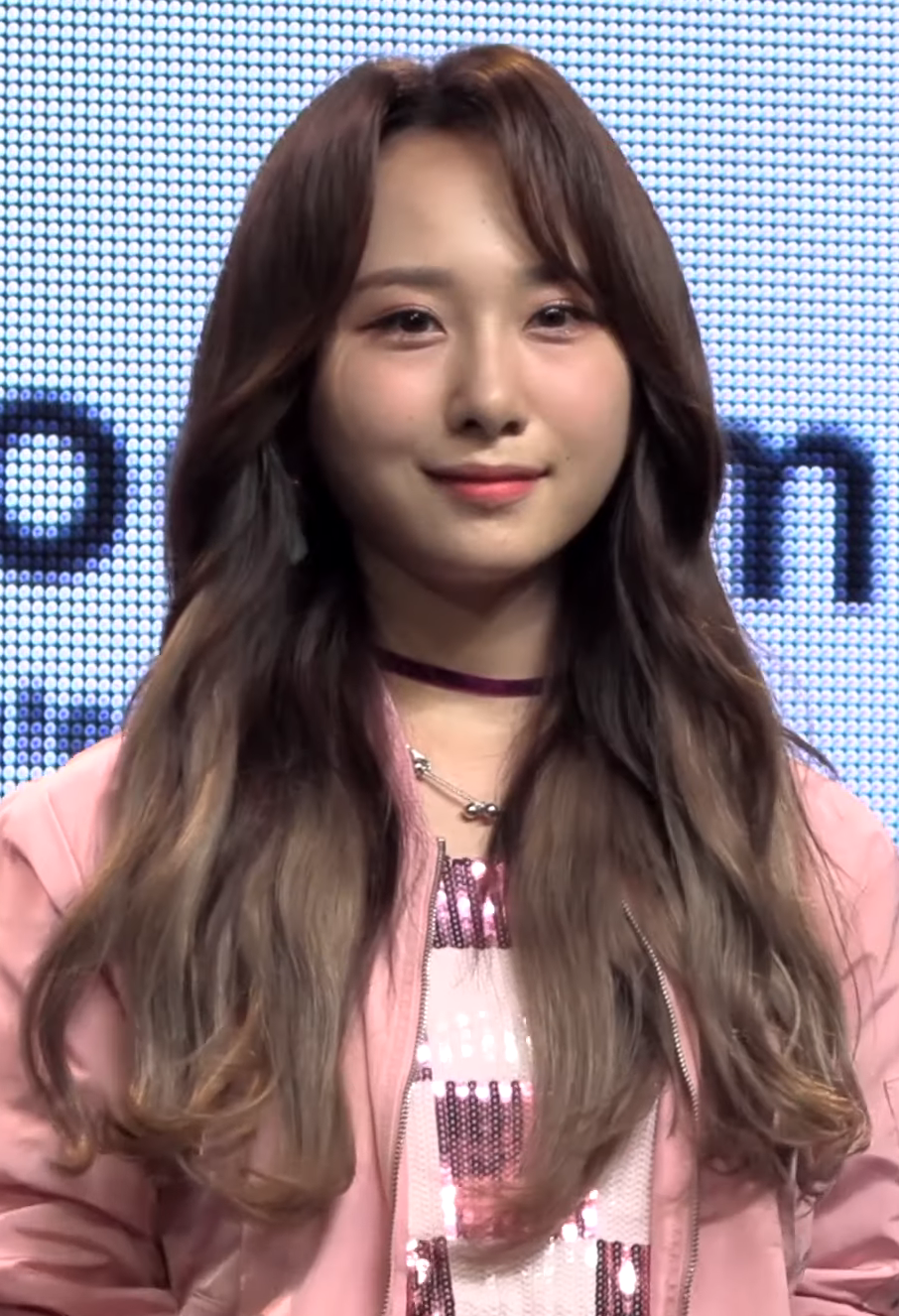
- Takahashi in August 2019
- Born: Juri Takahashi; 3 October 1997 (age 29); Kashima, Ibaraki, Japan
- Occupation: Singer
- Years active: 2011–present
- Agents: AKS; Woollim
- Musical career
- Genres: J-pop; K-pop
- Instrument: Vocals
- Formerly of: AKB48; Rocket Punch

Juri Takahashi (高橋 朱里, Takahashi Juri; born 3 October 1997 in Ibaraki Prefecture), also known mononymously as Juri (Korean: 쥬리; Japanese: ジュリ), is a Japanese singer based in South Korea. She is a former member of South Korean girl group Rocket Punch and Japanese girl group AKB48.

== Career ==
=== 2011–2018: AKB48 ===
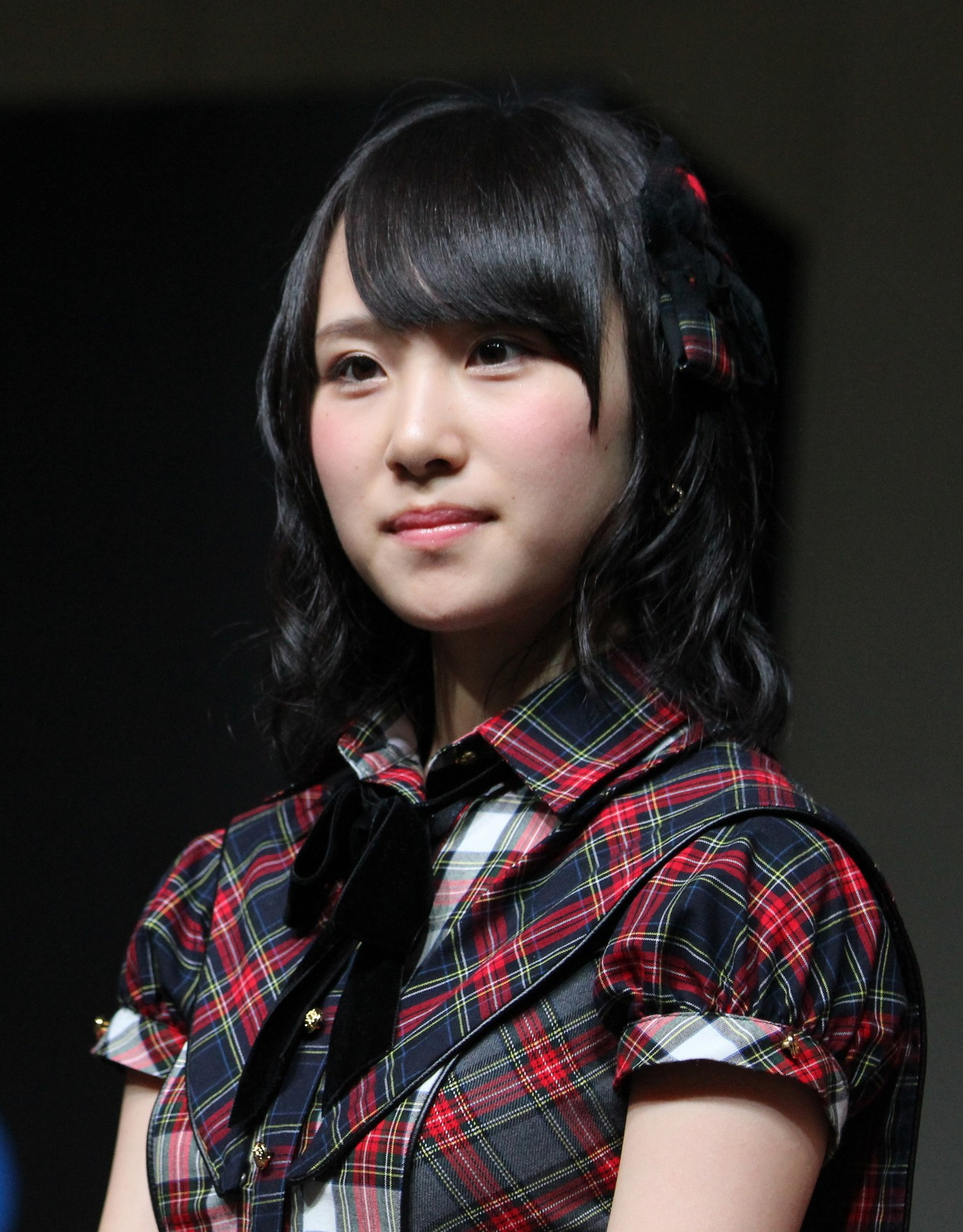
Takahashi at the Tokyo Auto Salon in Singapore on April 13, 2013

Takahashi passed AKB48's 12th generation auditions on 20 February 2011. In March 2012, she was promoted to the newly created Team 4, but was transferred to Team A in August 2012 when original Team 4 was disbanded. In February 2014, Takahashi was briefly transferred to Team B. In March 2015, Takahashi was transferred back to Team 4 (which was reformed in 2013) and appointed its captain. She would lead the team for nearly three years before being transferred to Team B as its Captain in December 2017, where she would remain until graduation in May 2019.

Takahashi would go on to participate in 16 A-side and 30 B-side songs, as well as a variety of television dramas, movies, variety shows and stage plays in her 7-year tenure.

In the group's General Elections in 2014, Takahashi ranked for the first time at 28th. In 2015, she ranked at 25th. In 2016, she ranked at 15th, making it the first time she entered the Senbatsu. In 2017, she ranked at 11th place, the highest rank she will achieve in a general election. In 2018, she ranked at 12th place. In 2018, Takahashi participated in Produce 48 and was ranked #16.

=== 2019–2024: Rocket Punch and Queendom Puzzle ===
Takahashi was originally slated to hold a birthday event on 6 February 2019, but on 3 February, she postponed the event to March due to resting from a car accident. On 4 March 2019, Takahashi announced she was graduating from AKB48 in May 2019. In the same report, she revealed she had signed an exclusive contract with the South Korean label Woollim Entertainment, after they e-mailed her.

On 23 July 2019, Takahashi was announced as a member of Rocket Punch, a new six-member girl group from Woollim. The group debuted on 7 August 2019, with their first extended play (EP) Pink Punch. In 2020, Takahashi ran a series of vlogs on Rocket Punch's YouTube channel titled Juriful Days.

In May 2023, Takahashi together with Rocket Punch members Yeonhee and Suyun were revealed as contestants of Mnet's new survival show Queendom Puzzle. Takahashi was eventually eliminated in the final episode, finishing 12th overall.

On May 24, 2024, Woollim announced Takahashi's departure from Rocket Punch following the expiration of her exclusive contract with the company.

== Discography ==
List of soundtrack appearances, showing year released and album name
Title	Year	Peak chart positions	Album
Title	Year	KOR DL	Album
"I'll Be Your Energy" (with Kwon Eun-bi)	2022	147	Epic Seven OST

== Appearances ==
=== Stage units ===
AKB48 Team 4 1st Stage "Boku no Taiyou" (僕の太陽)

1. "Idol Nante Yobanaide" (アイドルなんて呼ばないで)

Team A Waiting Stage

1. "Skirt, Hirari" (スカート、ひらり)
2. "Tenshi no Shippo" (天使のしっぽ)
3. "Zannen Shojo" (残念少女)

AKB48 Team B 3rd Stage "Pajama Drive" (パジャマドライブ) (Revival)

1. "Pajama Drive" (パジャマドライブ)

=== TV variety ===
- Ariyoshi AKB Kyowakoku (有吉AKB共和国) (2011–2016)
- Shuukan AKB (週刊AKB) (2012)
- AKB Nemousu TV (AKBネ申テレビ) (2011–2018)
- AKBingo! (2012–2018)
- AKB48 no Anta Dare? (AKB48のあんた、誰?) (2012–2016)
- Renai Sousenkyo (恋愛総選挙) (2014)
- Produce 48 (2018)
- King of Mask Singer (2020)
- Queendom Puzzle (2023)

=== Web shows ===
- Qoo10 ON AIR (2022, Host)
- Love & The City (2025, Co-host)

=== TV dramas ===
- Majisuka Gakuen 3 (マジすか学園3) (NTV, 2012) – Messi
- So Long 1st Night (NTV, 2013)
- Sailor Zombie (セーラーゾンビ) (TV Tokyo, 2014), Mutsumi Oyamada
- Majisuka Gakuen 4 (マジすか学園4) (NTV, 2015), Uonome (Team Hinabe)
- Majisuka Gakuen 5 (マジすか学園4) (NTV, Hulu, 2015), Uonome (Team Hinabe)
- AKB Horror Night: Adrenaline's Night (AKBホラーナイト アドレナリンの夜) Ep.39 – Hide and Seek (TV Asahi, 2016), Yumi
- AKB Love Night: Love Factory (AKBラブナイト 恋工場) Ep.25 – Drama Love (TV Asahi, 2016), Kanako
- Cabasuka Gakuen (キャバすか学園) (NTV, 2016), Uonome (Iwashi)

=== Movies ===
- Shiritsu Bakarea Koukou (劇場版 私立バカレア高校) (2012)
