= Road to Kingdom: Ace of Ace =

2024 South Korean reality competition show

- Promotional poster
- Hangul: 로드 투 킹덤: Ace of Ace
- RR: Rodeu tu kingdeom: Ace of Ace
- MR: Rodŭ t'u k'ingdŏm: Ace of Ace
- Genre: Reality competition
- Directed by: Jo Woo-ri
- Presented by: Taemin (Shinee)
- Starring: Oneus; Cravity; Tempest; Younite; The New Six; The CrewOne (Note: A collaboration team of ATBO and Just B.); 8Turn
- Music by: Park Seung-seon; Kim Jong-woo
- Country of origin: South Korea
- Original language: Korean
- No. of episodes: 8

Production
- Executive producers: Park Chan-wook; Choi Hyo-jin (CP)
- Production company: Jeus Works

Original release
- Network: Mnet
- Release: September 19 – November 7, 2024

Related
- Queendom (2019); Road to Kingdom (2020); Kingdom: Legendary War (2021); Queendom 2 (2022); Queendom Puzzle (2023)

Road to Kingdom: Ace of Ace (Korean: 로드 투 킹덤: Ace of Ace) is a South Korean boy group reality competition survival show created by Mnet. The show was rebranded as an independent program from its predecessor. It premiered on Mnet on September 19, 2024, and aired every Thursday at 21:30 (KST). It is also available for streaming on TVING in South Korea, Abema in Japan, and Mnet K-pop YouTube channel in other countries.

The winner of the show would receive a prize money worth ₩100 million and an opportunity to attend KCON.

== Cast ==
Host

- Taemin (Shinee)

Contestants

- 8Turn
- Cravity
- Oneus
- Tempest
- The CrewOne (ATBO and Just B) (Note: Just B member Siwoo did not take part in the entire show due to hiatus.)
- TNX
- Younite

Special appearance

- Juyeon (The Boyz)

== Production and release ==
On April 24, 2024, Mnet's Road to Kingdom 2 was scheduled to be broadcast in the second half of 2024. The next day, The Fact reported that Xikers, The New Six, and 8Turn were named as the possible participants to appear on the show.

On May 1, 2024, Sports Chosun reported that Cravity, ATBO, and Younite were named as the other possible participants to appear on the show. While Joy News 24 reported that Tempest would also join as participants.

On June 26, 2024, Mnet announced that Road to Kingdom 2 will be rebrand as a standalone program unlike its predecessor which was more like a prequel to gain a spot in the sequel, Kingdom and PD Jo Woo-ri will direct the show. The next two days, Oneus who competed in the first season of the show reportedly joined the lineup.

On July 3, 2024, Ten Asia reported that Taemin will be the host of the show and it will premiere in September 2024. On July 10, Mnet confirmed the seven groups—The New Six, The CrewOne, 8Turn, Oneus, Younite, Cravity, and Tempest—as the final lineup of the show. On July 17, Mnet officially confirmed that Taemin will be the solo host of the show and it will premiere in September 2024.

On August 1, 2024, Mnet released a teaser video revealing Road to Kingdom: Ace of Ace as the official title of the show. On August 27, Mnet announced the broadcast date and time of the show to be on September 19, 2024, and would air every Thursday at 21:30 (KST).

On September 17, 2024, according to an article published by Kstyle, the show would be simultaneously broadcast on Abema SP2 and K World channels in Japan. On September 19, Mnet announced that each episode of the show would be live stream in TVING, Abema, and Mnet K-Pop YouTube channel.

== Rules ==
- The overall results would be of a two-track ranking basis: Team Ranking and Ace Ranking. In each performance round, all boy groups would pick their Aces, which is the center of each of their performances.
- After the three (3) preliminary performances, the boy group with the overall 1st place in Team Ranking and the boy group with the overall 1st place in Ace Ranking are guaranteed to advance to the final round.
- Only five (5) boy groups would have a chance to perform in the final.

== Results ==
=== Pre-evaluation ===
Artist	Predicted Ranking	
Artist	Self-Evaluation	Public Pre-Vote
8Turn	5th	5th
Cravity	2nd	1st
Oneus	3rd	2nd
Tempest	6th	3rd
The CrewOne	1st	4th
The New Six	4th	7th
Younite	7th	6th

=== Evaluation Match (Episode 1) ===
==== Ace Battle ====
Each boy group sends out their Ace to perform a solo performance. After the seven boy groups' Aces have performed, each boy group would send five of their members to each vote for three aces except their team's ace. The team that got 1st place for the public pre-vote in the predicted ranking, Cravity, gets the right to arrange the cue sheet for the Ace battle.

The team of the first placed Ace gets the right to arrange the cue sheet for the Team Battle, while the boy group with the last placed Ace would not be able to take part in the Team Battle.

Ace Battle results
#	Artist	Ace	Performance name	Self-evaluation votes	Ranking
1	Oneus	Hwanwoong	"Put On a Happy Face" (Note: Inspired by the Joker Stairs dance from the 2019 American film Joker.)	22	1st (Tie)
2	8Turn	Myungho	"In Vino Veritas: 진실"	21	3rd
3	The CrewOne	Lim Ji-min	"Dark Times"	22	1st (Tie)
4	Tempest	Hanbin	"Who Am I?"	8	6th
5	The New Six	Junhyeok	"Drowning" (Note: "Drowning" is an original song by Woodz.)	13	4th
6	Younite	Dey	"Untitled Freestyle"	12	5th
7	Cravity	Hyeongjun	"Act I: Odyssey into Gravity"	7	7th

To break the tie for first place, a re-vote is conducted with the five remaining teams voting. After the voting, Hwanwoong got 4 votes (1st place) while Lim Ji-min got 1 vote (2nd place).

Final Ace Battle Ranking
Ranking	Artist	Ace
1st	Oneus	Hwanwoong
2nd	The CrewOne	Lim Ji-min
3rd	8Turn	Myungho
4th	The New Six	Junhyeok
5th	Younite	Dey
6th	Tempest	Hanbin
7th	Cravity	Hyeongjun

==== Team Battle ====
Each boy group performs a 100-second performance. After the six boy groups have performed, all the teams would each send five of their members to each vote for three boy groups excluding their own respective boy groups.

Out of the total score of 1,000, 30% would be based on the self-evaluation aforementioned, while 70% would be based on evaluation from a 280-strong streaming audience, with each boy group gathering 40, and each of the streaming audience also voting for three boy groups excluding their own representative boy groups. As Hwanwoong won the Ace Battle, Oneus gets the right to arrange the cue sheet for the Team Battle.

Team Battle results
#	Artist	Performance name	Self-evaluation		Streaming audience		Overall ranking
#	Artist	Performance name	Votes	Subrank	Votes	Subrank	Overall ranking
1	The New Six	"Move" (비켜) + "Fuego" (Mash Up Ver.)	24	1st	107	6th	4th
2	The CrewOne	"One Light Becomes One Time" (Note: Included sample from ATBO's song "7IBE".)	19	3rd	121	5th	6th
3	8Turn	"We" + "The Game"	20	2nd	140	2nd	1st
4	Younite	"Bad Cupid"(Remix) (Note: Inspired by the TV Series "Money Heist" & "High Rise Invasion".)	18	4th	122	4th	5th
5	Tempest	"Find Our Lighthouse" (Note: Included sample from their song "Light House".)	18	4th	130	3rd	2nd
6	Oneus	"Intro: Who Got the Joker?" (Note: Inspired by the 2019 film Joker.)	6	6th	166	1st	3rd
—N/a	Cravity (Note: As Hyeongjun placed seventh in the Ace Battle, Cravity can't participate in the Team Battle, thus they were automatically placed seventh.)	"Act II: Veni Vidi Vici" (Note: Included sample from their song "Veni Vidi Vici".)	—N/a				7th

=== Round 1: VS (Episode 2–3) ===
The seven boy groups each perform one song from the five representative boy groups that sold over one million albums in 2023, and is rearranged into a different style. The seven groups were divided into three matchups: two one-on-one matches (Stray Kids, and Enhypen songs), and one triple match (NCT, The Boyz and Tomorrow X Together songs).

The Team Ranking and Ace Ranking each has a total score of 10,000. The score system will be based on:

- Self-Evaluation – 3,000 points
- On-Site Audience Vote – 7,000 points

For the Self-Evaluation, each boy group would send five members to each vote for three aces and three teams, excluding their team's Ace and their own teams, respectively.

For the On-Site Audience Vote, 300 on-site audience must vote for their more preferred team in each VS battle, and also vote for three aces (for the Ace Ranking) and three boy groups out of all seven teams (for the Team Ranking). A benefit of 1,000 points will be given to each of the teams who won in their respective VS battles.

For each score category, the team with the most votes shall receive the maximum number of points (i.e., 3,000 for Self-Evaluation and 7,000 for Video Evaluation), while the remaining teams obtains the score in proportion from their vote count to the first-placed team's vote count.

Round 1: VS results
#	Artist	Match	Performance		Team				Ace		
#	Artist	Match	Song	Result	Team score	Benefit points	Total score (Note: Combination of Self-evaluation and Streaming audience scores.)	Rank	Ace member	Total score	Rank
1	The New Six	Stray Kids Match	"Phobia" (Note: Included sample of Requiem in D Minor by Wolfgang Amadeus Mozart.)	Win	8,879	1,000	9,879	3rd	Hwi	6,465	4th
2	Tempest	Stray Kids Match	"Maniac: Freaky Lab"	Lose	4,756	0	4,756	5th	Lew	6,025	5th
3	8Turn	Enhypen Match	"Future Perfect (Pass the Mic)"	Lose	4,423	0	4,423	7th	Yunkyu	4,517	7th
4	Younite	Enhypen Match	"Bite Me" (Note: Inspired by the 1973 film The Exorcist and 2016–2021 TV series Lucifer.)	Win	9,249	1,000	10,249	2nd	Eunsang	9,160	2nd
5	Oneus	Triple Match (NCT X The Boyz X TXT)	"Kick It" (영웅; 英雄) (Note: Original song by NCT 127.) (Note: Inspired by 2014 film Kingsman: The Secret Service.)	Lose	6,997	0	6,997	4th	Hwanwoong	9,483	1st
6	The CrewOne	Triple Match (NCT X The Boyz X TXT)	"Watch It" (Note: Original song by The Boyz.)	Lose	4,585	0	4,585	6th	Seunghwan	4,674	6th
7	Cravity	Triple Match (NCT X The Boyz X TXT)	"Sugar Rush Ride" (Note: Original song by Tomorrow X Together.) (Note: Inspired by 2022 film Talk to Me.)	Win	9,769	1,000	10,769	1st	Hyeongjun	7,498	3rd

Round 1: 'VS' Score Summary
Rank	Artist	Ace Total Score	Team Total Score	R1 Total Score
1st	Younite	9,160	10,249	19,409
2nd	Cravity	7,498	10,769	18,267
3rd	Oneus	9,483	6,997	16,480
4th	The New Six	6,465	9,879	16,344
5th	Tempest	6,025	4,756	10,781
6th	The CrewOne	4,674	4,585	9,259
7th	8Turn	4,517	4,423	8,940

==== 1-on-1 Ace Battle ====
If a team places first on both the Ace Ranking and Team Ranking, then that team automatically gets the right to arrange the cue sheet for the next round. However, if the first placed group in the Team Ranking and the group with the first-place Ace are not the same, a one-on-one Ace Battle would be done between the two teams to own the right to cue sheet arrangement. The voting shall be done via self-evaluation — with each team sending the number of members equivalent to the least number of members among the five remaining teams. Since The New Six and Tempest have the least number of members among the remaining five, having 6 members, six members will vote from each team, making a total of 30 voters for the Ace Battle.

1-on-1 Ace Battle results
#	Team	Ace	Performance Title	Votes	Result
1	Cravity	Hyeongjun	Dance with the Devil	6	Lose
2	Oneus	Hwanwoong	Sovereign Shadows	24	Win

Therefore, Oneus gets the right to arrange the cue sheet for the next round.

=== Round 2: Identity (Episode 4–5) ===
Each team must show their color and identity by performing their representative hit songs that is rearranged and different from their usual stages of the song. For this round, there would be two Aces per team. The score system for the Team Ranking and Ace Ranking will be similar as that of Round 1:

- Self-Evaluation – 3,000 points
- On-Site Audience Vote – 7,000 points

After the second round, one team would be eliminated. The candidates for elimination will be the seventh-place team in the Team Ranking and the seventh-place ace in the Ace Ranking on the cumulative scores and ranking from Rounds 1 to 2. The team to be eliminated will be determined by an Ace Battle between the two teams. If a team places seventh both in the cumulative Ace Ranking and Team Ranking, then they would be eliminated immediately without holding an Ace Battle.

Round 2: Identity results
#	Team	Performance Song	Team		Ace		
#	Team	Performance Song	Score	Rank	Members	Score	Rank
1	8Turn	"Tic Tac"	8,488	3rd	Myungho; Jaeyun	8,623	3rd
2	The New Six	"Love or Die" (Note: Included sample of Swan Lake by Pyotr Ilyich Tchaikovsky.)	4,498	7th	Junhyeok; Kyungjun	4,295	7th
3	Cravity	"Love or Die"	10,000	1st	Taeyoung; Minhee	9,045	2nd
4	Younite	"Waterfall" (Note: Inspired by 1975 Broadway Musical Chicago.)	5,605	6th	Eunsang; Woono	6,046	6th
5	The CrewOne	"Attitude" (Note: Original song by ATBO.) + "Get Away" (Note: Original song by Just B.) (Note: Inspired by the Harry Potter (film series).)	5,755	5th	Junseok; Lim Ji-min	6,990	5th
6	Tempest	"Eye of the Tempest" (폭풍의 눈) + "Can't Stop Shining" (Note: Inspired by both animated film and live-action film of Alice in Wonderland.)	6,911	4th	Hyuk; Hanbin	7,657	4th
7	Oneus	"No Diggity" (반박볼가) (Note: Inspired by the film Mad Max: Fury Road.)	9,338	2nd	Hwanwoong; Seoho	9,629	1st

Round 2: 'Identity' Score Summary
Rank	Team	Team total	Ace total	R2 Total Score
1st	Cravity	10,000	9,045	19,045
2nd	Oneus	9,338	9,629	18,967
3rd	8Turn	8,488	8,623	17,111
4th	Tempest	6,911	7,657	14,568
5th	The CrewOne	5,755	6,990	12,745
6th	Younite	5,605	6,046	11,651
7th	The New Six	4,498	4,295	8,793

The cumulative scores for the Team Ranking and Ace Ranking are as follows:

Candidate for Elimination

Team Cumulative Scores (Rounds 1–2)
Rank	Team	Round 1	Round 2	Team total
1st	Cravity	10,769	10,000	20,769
2nd	Oneus	6,997	9,338	16,335
3rd	Younite	10,249	5,605	15,854
4th	The New Six	9,879	4,498	14,377
5th	8Turn	4,423	8,488	12,911
6th	Tempest	4,756	6,911	11,667
7th	The CrewOne	4,585	5,755	10,340

Ace Cumulative Scores (Rounds 1–2)
Rank	Team	Round 1	Round 2	Ace total
1st	Oneus	9,483	9,629	19,112
2nd	Cravity	7,498	9,045	16,543
3rd	Younite	9,160	6,046	15,206
4th	Tempest	6,025	7,657	13,682
5th	8Turn	4,517	8,623	13,140
6th	The CrewOne	4,674	6,990	11,664
7th	The New Six	6,465	4,295	10,760

==== Elimination Ace Battle ====
For the first Elimination Ace Battle, two teams that are the candidates for elimination can send up to 2 people to be the Ace(s). The voting shall be done via self-evaluation — with each team sending the number of members equivalent to the least number of members among the five remaining teams. Since Oneus have the least number of members among the remaining five, having 5 members, five members will vote from each team, making a total of 25 voters for the Ace Battle.

Elimination Ace Battle results
#	Team	Ace(s)	Performance title	Votes	Result
1	The CrewOne	Junseok; Seunghwan	Like a Tiger with Wings (여호첨익; 如虎添翼)	14	Survived
2	The New Six	Hwi	Underworld	11	Eliminated

This results to The New Six being the first team to be eliminated.

==== Cumulative Scores and Ranking (Rounds 1-2) ====
The cumulative scores and ranking for the first two rounds are as follows:

Eliminated

Cumulative Scores and Ranking results (R1–R2)
Rank	Team	Team total	Ace total	Overall score
1st	Cravity	20,769	16,543	37,312
2nd	Oneus	16,335	19,112	35,447
3rd	Younite	15,854	15,206	31,060
4th	8Turn	12,911	13,140	26,051
5th	Tempest	11,667	13,682	25,349
6th	The CrewOne	10,340	11,664	22,004
7th	The New Six	14,377	10,760	25,137

=== Round 3: No Limit ===
Only five teams will advance to the Finals. One out of the six teams will be eliminated after Round 3. The overall first place in the Cumulative Team Ranking and the first place in the Cumulative Ace Ranking for Rounds 1–3 will directly advance to the Finals. Meanwhile, the team with lowest score (6th place) in the overall ranking (combined Team Score and Ace Score) will be eliminated

For the third round, No Limit will be set for the performances. However, Round 3 will be composed of 2 parts: Ace Battle and Team Battle.

==== Ace Battle ====
The Ace Battle will be composed of two performances of different concepts: Water and Fire. The teams pick an Ace from their team who suits each concept well. Then, for each performance, the Aces will join to prepare two Ace unit stages. The total score obtained by each Ace from the two stages shall be added on their team's respective Ace Score.

Round 3: Ace Battle results
Rank	Team	Water Stage				Fire Stage				Total Score
Rank	Team	Ace	Song	Score	Rank	Ace	Song	Score	Rank	Total Score
1st	Cravity	Minhee	"Paradise"	4,000	2nd (Tie)	Taeyoung	"Framework"	5,000	1st	9,000
2nd	8Turn	Jaeyun	"Paradise"	5,000	1st	Myungho	"Framework"	3,000	3rd	8,000
3rd	The CrewOne	Seunghwan	"Paradise"	1,000	5th	Junseok	"Framework"	4,000	2nd	5,000
4th	Oneus	Hwanwoong	"Paradise"	4,000	2nd (Tie)	Leedo	"Framework"	0	6th	4,000
4th	Tempest	Hyuk	"Paradise"	2,000	4th	Lew	"Framework"	2,000	4th	4,000
6th	Younite	Sion	"Paradise"	0	6th	Hyungseok	"Framework"	1,000	5th	1,000

==== Team Battle ====
The score system will be similar as that of the Team Battle for Rounds 1 and 2:

- Self-Evaluation – 3,000 points
- Video Evaluation – 7,000 points

For the self-evaluation, each boy group would send five members to each vote for three aces and three teams, excluding their team's Ace and their own teams, respectively. The video evaluation shall be based on audience vote wherein the audience shall watch each team's performance on screen and pick their top three Aces and top three teams.

For each score category, the team with the most votes shall receive the maximum number of points (i.e., 3,000 for Self-Evaluation and 7,000 for Video Evaluation), while the remaining teams obtains the score in proportion from their vote count to the first-placed team's vote count.

Round 3: Team Battle results
#	Team	Performance song	Team		Ace			Total Score	Ranking
#	Team	Performance song	Score	Rank	Members	Score	Rank	Total Score	Ranking
1	The CrewOne	"Sherlock (Clue + Note)" (Note: Original song by Shinee.)	5,993	5th	Junseok	6,815	5th	11,808	5th
2	Tempest	"Jopping" (Note: Original song by SuperM.) (Note: Inspired by the movie The Matrix & the Metaverse.)	4,720	6th	Hyuk	5,685	6th	10,405	6th
3	Younite	"Armageddon" (Note: Original song by Aespa.)	9,250	2nd	Eunsang	8,000	4th	17,250	2nd
4	8Turn	"Love Dive" (Note: Original song by Ive.) (Note: Inspired by Narcissus and King Tut.)	7,284	4th	Myungho	9,173	1st	16,457	4th
5	Oneus	"Luna" (월하미인; 月下美人) (Note: Included the "Intro: Window" by Oneus featuring Choi Ye-lim.)	8,590	3rd	Seoho	8,336	2nd	16,926	3rd
6	Cravity	"Overdose" (중독) (Note: Original song by Exo.)	9,321	1st	Serim	8,248	3rd	17,569	1st

==== Cumulative Scores & Ranking (Rounds 1-3) ====
The overall scores and ranking for Round 3 are as follows:

Round 3: No Limit overall summary
Rank	Team	Ace Battle (10,000)			Team Battle (20,000)			Round 3 Overall Score (30,000)
Rank	Team	Water Stage (5,000)	Fire Stage (5,000)	Ace Score (10,000)	Team Ranking (10,000)	Ace Ranking (10,000)	Team Score (20,000)	Round 3 Overall Score (30,000)
1st	Cravity	4,000	5,000	9,000	9,321	8,248	17,569	26,569
2nd	8Turn	5,000	3,000	8,000	7,284	9,173	16,457	24,457
3rd	Oneus	4,000	0	4,000	8,590	8,336	16,926	20,926
4th	Younite	0	1,000	1,000	9,250	8,000	17,250	18,250
5th	The CrewOne	1,000	4,000	5,000	5,993	6,815	12,808	17,808
6th	Tempest	2,000	2,000	4,000	4,720	5,685	10,405	14,405

The Cumulative Scores and Ranking for Rounds 1-3 are as follows:

Direct Advance to Finals

Team Cumulative Scores (Rounds 1–3)
Rank	Team	Score Breakdown			Team Total (30,000)
Rank	Team	Round 1 (10,000)	Round 2 (10,000)	Round 3 (10,000)	Team Total (30,000)
1st	Cravity	10,769	10,000	9,321	30,090
2nd	Younite	10,249	5,605	9,250	25,104
3rd	Oneus	6,997	9,338	8,590	24,925
4th	8Turn	4,423	8,488	7,284	20,195
5th	Tempest	4,756	6,911	4,720	16,387
6th	The CrewOne	4,585	5,755	5,993	16,333

Ace Cumulative Scores (Rounds 1–3)
Rank	Team	Score Breakdown				Ace Total (40,000)
Rank	Team	Round 1 (10,000)	Round 2 (10,000)	Round 3 (20,000)		Ace Total (40,000)
Rank	Team	Round 1 (10,000)	Round 2 (10,000)	Ace Battle (10,000)	Ace Ranking (10,000)	Ace Total (40,000)
1st	Cravity	7,498	9,045	9,000	8,248	33,791
2nd	Oneus	9,483	9,629	4,000	8,336	31,448
3rd	8Turn	4,517	8,623	8,000	9,173	30,313
4th	Younite	9,160	6,046	1,000	8,000	24,206
5th	The CrewOne	4,674	6,990	5,000	5,815	23,479
6th	Tempest	6,025	7,657	4,000	5,685	23,367

Eliminated

Cumulative Scores and Ranking results (R1–R3)
Rank	Team	Team Score (30,000)	Ace Score (40,000)	Overall Score (70,000)
1st	Cravity	30,090	33,791	63,881
2nd	Oneus	24,925	31,448	56,373
3rd	8Turn	20,195	30,313	50,508
4th	Younite	25,104	24,206	49,310
5th	The CrewOne	16,333	23,479	39,812
6th	Tempest	16,387	23,367	39,754

This results to Tempest being the second team to be eliminated from the show. The five teams that advanced to the Finals were Cravity, Oneus, 8Turn, Younite, and The CrewOne.

=== Round 4: Live Finale ===
The Score for the Finals with a total of 200,000 points shall be based on the following:

- Preliminary Score (Rounds 1-3) – 100,000 points
  - Team Ranking – 30,000 points
  - Ace Ranking – 40,000 points
  - Accumulated Video View Count – 30,000 points
- Live Broadcast Score – 100,000 points
  - Digital Points of New Release Songs (Note: For the digital points of the newly released songs, the following platforms shall be counted for the calculation: Domestic (Korea): Melon, Vibe, Genie, Flo, Bugs; Global: Apple Music, Spotify, YouTube; The view and stream counting period would be from November 1, 2024 12:00 (KST) to November 3, 2024 23:59 (KST)) – 30,000 points
  - Live Broadcast Votes – 70,000 points

The 5 remaining boy groups will each perform a newly produced song live.

Finale Live Comeback Stages (Episode 8)
Order	Artist	Ace (Note: There are no Aces during the actual final song performances, but only selected Ace from each team are presented on the start of the show.)	Song	Digital Points	Ranking (Digitals)
1	Younite	Eunsang	"Faith" (신념; 信念)	4,290	5th
2	The CrewOne	Junseok	"Hit the Floor"	4,713	4th
3	Oneus	Hwanwoong	"I Know You Know" (Note: Included a sample of "Khachaturian – Masquerade Suite".)	25,730	2nd
4	8TURN	Jaeyun	"Speed Run"	5,828	3rd
5	Cravity	Taeyoung	"Historia"	30,000	1st
Special Performance
Vocal Aces (Myungho (8TURN), Bain (The CrewOne), Seoho (Oneus), Woobin (Cravity), Eunho (Younite))			"Continue"	—	

The total score for the Preliminary Performances shall be adjusted such that the 1st place team gets 70,000 points and the remaining teams gets the number of points in proportion from their score to the 1st-placed team's score. The first-placed team for each of the remaining score categories shall receive the maximum score (e.g., 30,000 points for Full Ver. Performance Videos) while the rest of the teams shall receive the score in proportion to the first-placed team's score.

Final Score Summary
Rank	Team	Preliminary Performances (70,000)	Full Ver. Performance Videos (30,000)	Digital Points (30,000)	Live Broadcast Votes (70,000)	Total Score (200,000)
1st	Cravity	70,000	30,000	30,000	70,000	200,000
2nd	Oneus	61,773	27,507	25,730	34,378	149,388
3rd	8Turn	55,346	5,429	5,828	6,768	73,371
4th	Younite	54,033	7,411	4,290	6,630	72,364
5th	The CrewOne	43,625	14,790	4,713	7,261	70,389
