= Rise Waves =

EP by Giuk
- Released: November 15, 2023
- Recorded: 2023
- Genre: Rock
- Length: 24:59
- Language: Korean
- Label: RBW; Kakao Entertainment

Giuk chronology
| Psycho Xybernetics : Turn Over (2023) | Rise Waves (2023) |

Singles from Rise Waves
- 1. "Scratch" Released: November 15, 2023

Music videos
- "Scratch" on YouTube
- "My Blue" on YouTube

Rise Waves (Korean: 現像 : 소년의 파란; RR: Hyeonsang : Sonyeonui Paran) is the second extended play by South Korean musician and Onewe member Giuk. It was released by RBW on November 15, 2023, and distributed by Kakao Entertainment. The EP consists of eight songs, all primarily written and composed by Giuk, including the lead single "Scratch".

== Background and release ==
On November 1, 2023, RBW announced through a teaser released on Onewe's social media accounts that Giuk would be releasing his second solo EP Rise Waves on November 15, 2023, just seven months after the release of his solo debut EP Psycho Xybernetics : Turn Over.

On November 4, the full track list was revealed with a total of eight songs, all of which were primarily written and composed by Giuk, and five feature artists including Moonbyul of Mamamoo featuring in "Block123", RARE and Gray Dot, soloists and members of Giuk's independent music crew Named Late, featuring in "Happy or Not?", and singer-songwriter Yong Yong and Leedo of Oneus featuring in "Penrose Stairs".

On November 12, he held a solo concert entitled "Flight1112" where he performed some of the songs from his upcoming EP including the lead single "Scratch".

Following the release of the EP and main music video for "Scratch" on November 15, a series of different track videos for each of the eight songs on the album were sequentially released, including a special music video for the song "My Blue".

Alongside the promotion for the lead single, Giuk and Moonbyul also promoted "Block123" with a performance together on the music show NPop on Naver.

== Track listing ==
| No. | Title | Lyrics | Music | Arrangement | Length |
|---|---|---|---|---|---|
| 1. | "Intro: Foreverest" (Intro : 영원의 숲) | Giuk | Giuk, Gray Dot | Gray Dot | 1:39 |
| 2. | "Scratch" (내 영혼에 낸 Scratch) | Giuk | Giuk, Jeon Da-woon (RBW) | Jeon Da-woon (RBW), Giuk | 3:30 |
| 3. | "Block123" (feat. Moonbyul of Mamamoo) (보도블록123) | Giuk, CocoDubuPapa (RBW) | Giuk, CocoDubuPapa (RBW) | CocoDubuPapa (RBW) | 3:17 |
| 4. | "Overtake" (추월) | Giuk | Giuk, Jeon Da-woon (RBW), mediumrarecookies, 8:59 | Jeon Da-woon (RBW), mediumrarecookies, 8:59, Giuk | 3:47 |
| 5. | "Happy or Not?" (feat. RARE, Gray Dot) | Giuk, Gray Dot, RARE | Giuk, Gray Dot, RARE | Gray Dot | 2:56 |
| 6. | "Penrose Stairs" (feat. YongYong, Leedo of Oneus) | Giuk, YongYong, Leedo | Giuk, YongYong, Leedo, LIVING PUFF | LIVING PUFF | 3:11 |
| 7. | "My Blue" | Giuk | Giuk, Gray Dot | Gray Dot | 2:53 |
| 8. | "Outro : Dresden" (Outro : 한 소녀의 촛불) | Giuk, Kauhaxi | Giuk, Kauhaxi | Kauhaxi | 3:42 |
| Total length: | | | | | 24:59 |

== Charts ==
| Chart (2023) | Peak position |
|---|---|
| South Korean Albums (Gaon) | 33 |

== Release history ==
| Country | Date | Format | Label | Ref |
|---|---|---|---|---|
| South Korea | November 15, 2023 | CD, digital download, streaming | RBW; Kakao Entertainment | |
| Various | November 15, 2023 | CD, digital download, streaming | RBW; Kakao Entertainment | |
