= Psycho Xybernetics: Turn Over =

EP by Giuk
- Released: April 20, 2023
- Recorded: 2023
- Genre: Rock
- Length: 23:26
- Language: Korean
- Label: RBW; Kakao Entertainment

Giuk chronology
Psycho Xybernetics: Turn Over (2023)	Rise Waves (2023)

Singles from Psycho Xybernetics: Turn Over
- 1. "Time Machine (2100)" Released: April 20, 2023

Music videos
- "Time Machine (2100)" on YouTube
- "Love Virus♥ (2050)" on YouTube

Psycho Xybernetics: Turn Over is the solo debut extended play by South Korean musician Giuk of Onewe. It was released by RBW on April 20, 2023, and distributed by Kakao Entertainment. The EP consists of eight songs, all primarily written and composed by Giuk, including the lead single "Time Machine (2100)".

== Background and release ==
On March 9, 2023, RBW announced that Giuk would no longer be using his former stage name CyA, and will go by his legal name, Giuk, for all official activities henceforth, which included both his activities as a member of Onewe and solo activities.

On April 6, RBW announced through a teaser released on Onewe's social media accounts that Giuk would be releasing his first solo EP Psycho Xybernetics: Turn Over on April 20, 2023, at 6pm KST.

On April 8, the full track list was revealed with a total of eight songs, all of which were primarily written and composed by Giuk, and four feature artists including long-time best friend Sunwoo, member of the boygroup The Boyz and Giuk's independent music crew Named Late, as well as singer-songwriter Aden and rappers NiiHWA and KAMI.

On April 8 and 9, Giuk held his first solo concert Prologue: Turn Over, where he performed songs from his upcoming EP including the lead single "Time Machine (2100)".

On April 20, Giuk officially made his solo debut with the release of the EP and music video for the lead single "Time Machine (2100)".

On May 1, a special music video for the song "Love Virus♥ (2050)" (feat. Sunwoo) was released. The music video production was credited to Named Late, with Giuk and Sunwoo co-directing the music video themselves, and filmed with help of their friends independent of their agencies.

Following the release of the EP, Giuk held an encore concert Epilogue: Turn Over on June 6.

== Track listing ==
No.	Title	Lyrics	Music	Arrangement	Length
1.	"Intro: X" (Intro: 새 지구)	Giuk	Giuk	Giuk	1:09
2.	"Time Machine (2100)" (제0호선 시간역행)	Giuk	Giuk, Jeon Da-woon (RBW)	Jeon Da-woon (RBW), Giuk	3:17
3.	"Unblown (2020)" (feat. Aden) (꽃에 물 안 주고 피길 원하네)	Giuk, Aden	Giuk, Jeon Da-woon (RBW), Aden	Jeon Da-woon (RBW), Gray Dot	3:17
4.	"Ego (2021)" (feat. NiiHWA) (자기중심적)	Giuk, NiiHWA, Kauhaxi	Giuk, Kauhaxi, NiiHWA, Jin Min-ho (RBW)	Jin Min-ho (RBW), Kauhaxi	2:54
5.	"Love Virus♥ (2050)" (feat. Sunwoo)	Giuk, Sunwoo (The Boyz)	Giuk, Sunwoo, LIVING PUFF	LIVING PUFF	3:12
6.	"Rarity (2062)" (멸종 위기종)	Giuk	Giuk, Jeon Da-woon (RBW), Gray Dot	Jeon Da-woon (RBW), Gray Dot, Giuk	3:30
7.	"Xybernetic (2077)" (feat. KAMI)	Giuk, KAMI	Giuk, KAMI	Giuk	2:56
8.	"Apocalypse (2090)"	Giuk	Giuk, YHK, Gray Dot	YHK, Gray Dot	3:08
Total length:					23:26

== Charts ==
Chart (2023)	Peak position
South Korean Albums (Gaon)	56

== Release history ==
Country	Date	Format	Label	Ref
South Korea	April 20, 2023	CD, digital, download	RBW; Kakao Entertainment	
Various	April 20, 2023	CD, digital, download	RBW; Kakao Entertainment	
