= Binary Code (EP) =

Extended play by Oneus

EP by Oneus
- Released: May 11, 2021
- Genre: K-pop
- Length: 16:59
- Label: RBW

Oneus chronology
Devil (2021)	Binary Code (2021)	Blood Moon (2021)

Singles from Binary Code
- 1. "Black Mirror" Released: May 11, 2021

Music video
- "Black Mirror" on YouTube

Binary Code is the fifth extended play by South Korean boy group Oneus. It was released by RBW and distributed by Kakao Entertainment on May 11, 2021.

== Background and release ==
Binary Code contains the lead single "Black Mirror", a rock version of their debut song "Valkyrie", and three new tracks. Group member Ravn co-wrote the lead single "Black Mirror".

== Commercial performance ==
The EP ranked at number 2 for the weekly Gaon Album Chart and number 4 for the monthly chart. The EP sold 103,240 copies in South Korea by the end of June 2021. Nearly four years after release, it re-enter the weekly chart, now re-named the Circle Album Chart, in January 2025 at number 20 with 5,001 copies sold in the week.

== Critical reception ==
Black Mirror was listed as one of 'The Best K-Pop Tracks of 2021' by Dazed. Dazed stated "There's the slap of funk bass and washes of strings, elements that comprised the backbone of 1979's Off The Wall, but ONEUS's composers have recalibrated the analogue into a cool, impersonal sheen of digital production. It's a canny twist; a thumping, computerised nu-disco backdrop for the song's flesh and blood lament – the loss of human connection within the technological age."

Puah Ziwei, writing for NME, noted that the lead single "Black Mirror"'s music video "seem to draw inspiration from the late Michael Jackson" and the "lyrics also reference a number of the late pop icon's hits, including 'Bad' and 'Man In The Mirror'."

=== Year-end lists ===
Select year-end rankings of track Black Mirror
Critic/Publication	Accolade	Rank	Ref.
Dazed	The Best K-Pop Tracks of 2021	14	

== Track listing ==
No.	Title	Lyrics	Music	Arrangement	Length
1.	"Black Mirror"	Kim Do-hoon; Lee Sang-ho; Seo Yong-bae; Basick; Inner child; Ravn	Kim Do-hoon; Lee Sang-ho; Seo Yong-bae; Inner child	Kim Do-hoon; Lee Sang-ho; Seo Yong-bae	3:40
2.	"Connect with Us"	Lee Sang-ho; Seo Yong-bae; Lee Ho-sang; Ravn; Leedo	Lee Sang-ho; Seo Yong-bae; Lee Ho-sang	Lee Sang-ho; Seo Yong-bae; Lee Ho-sang	2:54
3.	"Polarity" (울과 기름)	Koko Tofu Dad; Ravn; Leedo	Koko Tofu Dad; Ravn	Koko Tofu Dad	3:27
4.	"Happy Birthday"	Cosmic Sound; Cosmic Girl; Ravn; Leedo	Cosmic Sound; Cosmic Girl	Cosmic Sound; Cosmic Girl	3:11
5.	"Valkyrie (Rock ver.)" (발키리)	Lee Sang-ho; Inner child; Ravn; Leedo	Lee Sang-ho; Inner child; Ming-ki	Lee Sang-ho; Lee Ho-sang; Ming-ki; Koko Tofu Dad	3:47
Total length:					16:59

== Charts ==
=== Album ===
==== Weekly charts ====
Chart performance for Binary Code
Chart (2021)	Peak position
Japanese Albums (Oricon)	36
South Korean Albums (Gaon)	2

==== Monthly charts ====
Chart performance for Binary Code
Chart (2021)	Position
South Korean Albums (Gaon)	4

=== Songs ===
==== Weekly charts ====
Chart performance for "Black Mirror"
Chart (2021)	Peak position
Japanese Singles (Oricon)	17
South Korea (Gaon)	134

== Release history ==
Release history and formats for Binary Code
Region	Date	Format	Label
South Korea	May 11, 2021	CD; digital download; streaming	RBW; Kakao Entertainment
Various	May 11, 2021	Digital download; streaming	RBW; Kakao Entertainment

== Certification and sales ==
Region	Certification	Certified units/Sales
Album
South Korea (KMCA)	—	108,241
