= Road to Kingdom =

2020 South Korean reality competition series

- Promotional poster
- Hangul: 로드 투 킹덤
- RR: Rodeu tu kingdeom
- MR: Rodŭ t'u k'ingdŏm
- Genre: Reality competition
- Directed by: Jo Wook-hyung; Lee Byung-wook; Jo Hye-mi
- Presented by: Lee Da-hee; Jang Sung-kyu
- Starring: Pentagon; ONF; Golden Child; The Boyz; Verivery; Oneus; TOO
- Country of origin: South Korea
- Original language: Korean
- No. of episodes: 8

Production
- Running time: 90–120 minutes
- Production company: Mnet

Original release
- Network: Mnet
- Release: April 30 – June 18, 2020

Related
- Queendom (2019); Kingdom: Legendary War (2021); Queendom 2 (2022); Queendom Puzzle (2023); Road to Kingdom: Ace of Ace (2024)

Road to Kingdom (Korean: 로드 투 킹덤) is a South Korean reality competition series created by Mnet. It aired on Mnet from April 30, to June 18, 2020, every Thursday at 20:00 (KST). It was known as the first part of the male counterpart of Queendom, and the prequel of Kingdom: Legendary War. A press conference was held on April 21, 2020.

Season 2 of the show, better known as Road to Kingdom: Ace of Ace, made its premiere on September 19, 2024. The Road to Kingdom series would be re-branded as a standalone program, rather than a prequel to Kingdom.

== Overview ==
Road to Kingdom was a battle for a spot in Kingdom (킹덤) between 7 boy groups with potential, but mostly unknown to many. Similar to Queendom, there would be Comeback Singles (newly produced songs) released on June 12, 2020.

During the season, special interview clips with Queendom contestants Park Bom, AOA (Chanmi), Mamamoo (Solar, Hwasa), Lovelyz (Mijoo, Kei), Oh My Girl (Hyojung, YooA) and (G)I-DLE (Soyeon, Yuqi) were shown in episode 1, as they shared their first thoughts about Road to Kingdom.

There were numbers as hints, which were given 1 week before the first recording of the show, and they were shown as follow:

- 1 boy group will advance to Kingdom, as part of winning the show; the number "1" also means the evaluation standards to be used
- 2 boy groups were eliminated throughout the show
- 4 performances (however, not all 7 boy groups will perform in all 4 performances)
- 7 boy groups
- 90 Seconds Performances (Preliminary Performances)

The Boyz, as the winner group of the show, secured a spot in the sequel program Kingdom: Legendary War.

== Rules ==
- There will be 2 boy groups to be eliminated throughout the show:
  - 1 boy group will be eliminated when they obtain the lowest cumulative points of the 1st and 2nd performances
  - 1 boy group (out of the remaining 6) will be eliminated when they obtain the lowest cumulative points after the 3rd performance
- The overall final ranking of the show (for the remaining 5 boy groups in the final performances) is based on the following criteria:
  1. 3 preliminary performances (1st Performance - 10,000 points, 2nd Performance - 10,000 points, 3rd Performance - 15,000 points)
  2. Video view points (based on the number of views of the performance videos (Full Version only) on YouTube and Naver TV; maximum of 15,000 points)
  3. Digital points of the Comeback Singles calculated from the time of release till June 16, 2020, at 23:59 (KST) (maximum of 15,000 points)
  4. Finale live comeback stages text message votes (domestic and international fans' votes; maximum of 35,000 points)
- The overall 1st placed boy group will be able to take part in Kingdom.
- The boy group which does not rank 1st overall, but ranks 1st in only the Final Live Performances, can also advance to take part in Kingdom.
- In the event of 1 boy group having both 1st overall and 1st in only the Final Live Performances, the said boy group will be the only boy group to take part in Kingdom.

=== Preliminary Performances - 90 Seconds Performances ===
The 7 boy groups each perform a 90-second performance that best expresses themselves.

There is no order decided before the performances - the order is decided on the spot. The first performing boy group is decided by the boy group that volunteers themselves first. After the first boy group has performed, they will decide on the second performing boy group, and the second boy group that has performed will then decide on the third performing boy group. The process goes on until all performances have been completed.

The round's points are entirely decided through a self-evaluation where each boy group will rank the other boy groups' performances from 1st to 6th.

- 1st place: 100 points
- 2nd place: 80 points
- 3rd place: 60 points
- 4th place: 40 points
- 5th place: 20 points
- 6th place: 5 points
Each boy group would receive self-evaluation points from the other 6 boy groups, and they will be added up to become the round's total points obtained for the boy group. This will, however, be not included in the overall points for the show.

=== 1st Performances - Song of King ===
The 7 boy groups each perform one song from their boy group seniors, and is rearranged into a different style.

Rules

- The 1st placed boy group for the 90 Seconds Performances will get a benefit of arranging the cue sheet for this round of performances.
- The round's points are entirely decided through a self-evaluation, where each boy group's members will rank the other boy groups' performances from 1st to 6th.
  - 1st place: 100 points
  - 2nd place: 80 points
  - 3rd place: 60 points
  - 4th place: 40 points
  - 5th place: 20 points
  - 6th place: 5 points
- As ONF and Oneus each have only 6 members, the remaining 5 boy groups will each send 6 of their members to vote for this round. (Total of 42 boy group members voting in this round)
- Each boy group would receive self-evaluation points from the other 6 boy groups' 36 members, and they will be added up to become the round's total points obtained for the boy group.
- The 1st placed boy group gets the full 10,000 points, and the remaining boy groups will each get points based on the proportion of their self-evaluation points to the self-evaluation points of the 1st placed boy group.

=== 2nd Performances - My Song ===
The 7 boy groups each perform one of their representative hit songs, that is rearranged and different from their usual stages of the song.

Rules

- The 1st placed boy group for the 1st Performances will get a benefit of arranging the cue sheet for this round of performances. However, the other boy groups do not find out their own spots, nor the ones of the others, in the cue sheet until the day of the performances.
- The round's points are decided through 2 categories:
  - Self-evaluation that was used for the 1st Performances voting, where each boy group would receive points from the other 6 boy groups' 36 members. (30% of the points for this round)
  - Online audience votes from 140 individuals. Each boy group will gather 20 individuals, and each individual only gets to vote for the top 3 performances in this round. (70% of the points for this round)
- The 1st placed boy group gets the full 10,000 points, and the remaining boy groups will each get points based on the proportion of their total points obtained to the total points obtained for the 1st placed boy group.

=== 3rd Performances - Part 1 (Collaboration) + Part 2 (Your Song) ===
The 6 remaining boy groups will have 2 performances for this round: the first being a collaboration performance, and the second being the performance of a song chosen by another boy group.

Rules (Collaboration)

- The 3 pairs of boy groups were matched by random picking of one boy group, followed by random picking of the next boy group to be paired with the boy group picked earlier on. The process goes on to form the remaining 2 pairs.
- There are no restrictions in the number of members each boy group would involve and their song choices.
- The round's points are decided through 2 categories:
  - Self-evaluation, where each boy group will send 6 members (total of 36 boy group members voting) and rank the 3 collaboration performances. (30% of the points for this round)
  - Online audience votes from 120 individuals. Each boy group will gather 20 individuals, and each individual ranks the 3 performances in this round. (70% of the points for this round)
  - 1st place - 10 points, 2nd place - 5 points, 3rd place - 1 point
- The 1st placed collaboration performance gets the full 5,000 points each for the boy groups involved, 3,000 each for the boy groups involved in the 2nd placed collaboration performance, and 1,000 each for the boy groups involved in the 3rd placed collaboration performance.

Rules (Your Song)

- The 6 remaining boy groups each pick a song, with no restriction, for this round.
- The songs chosen will each then be allocated to another boy group, but only within the pairings that were formed for the Collaboration round.
- The 1st placed boy group for the 2nd Performances will get a benefit of arranging the cue sheet for this round of performances. However, the other boy groups do not find out their own spots, nor the ones of the others, in the cue sheet until the day of the performances.
- The round's points are decided through 2 categories:
  - Self-evaluation, where each boy group will send 6 members (total of 36 boy group members voting). (30% of the points for this round)
  - Online audience votes from 120 individuals. Each boy group will gather 20 individuals, and each individual would only vote for the top 3 performances in this round. (70% of the points for this round)
- The 1st placed boy group gets the full 10,000 points, and the remaining boy groups will each get points based on the proportion of their total points obtained to the total points obtained for the 1st placed boy group.

=== Final Live Comeback Stages ===
The 5 remaining boy groups will each perform a newly produced song live.

- For this round, live votes will be allocated in the following distribution:
  - Domestic fans' text message votes (70% of the live votes)
  - International fans' voting through the Whosfan application (30% of the live votes)
- In addition, the following categories are also considered to decide the final winner:
  - Total points accumulated in the Performances prior to the finale (except for the 90 Seconds Performances)
  - View counts of the performance videos on YouTube and Naver TV
  - Digital points of the Comeback Singles calculated (from time of release to June 16, 2020, at 23:59 (KST))

== Cast ==
Hosts

- Lee Da-hee
- Jang Sung-kyu

Contestants

- Pentagon (Note: Member Yan An will not appear on the entire show.) (Note: Member Jinho has enlisted as an active duty soldier on May 11, 2020, hence after the 2nd Performances, the group will perform on the show without him.)
- ONF
- Golden Child
- The Boyz
- Verivery
- Oneus
- TOO (later known as TO1)

== Episodes ==
Each team will present a 90-second performance, which will then be evaluated by self-evaluation (i.e., the seven teams themselves). Each team will rank the other teams performances from 1st to 6th, wherein the following ranks shall corresponding to a number of points:

- 1st - 100
- 2nd - 80
- 3rd - 60
- 4th - 40
- 5th - 20
- 6th - 5

Then, the scores will be summed up and the ranking of the teams will be determined. The points for this round are not included in the overall points for the show.

Preliminary Performances: 90-Second Performances (Episode 1)
#	Artist	Performance Name	Self-evaluation Ranking & Points Breakdown (Note: For each vote: 1st place: 100 points; 2nd place: 80 points; 3rd place: 60 points; 4th place: 40 points; 5th place: 20 points; 6th place: 5 points)							Rank
#	Artist	Performance Name	1st	2nd	3rd	4th	5th	6th	TOTAL	Rank
1	TOO	Into the dysTOOpia (Note: Included sample from their song "Magnolia".)	0	0	1	1	1	3	135	7th
2	The Boyz	Sword of Victory	4	2	0	0	0	0	560	1st
3	Pentagon	Road to the Throne (Note: Included sample of their song "Shine".)	1	4	1	0	0	0	480	2nd
4	ONF	Lights On (Note: Included samples of their songs "We Must Love" & "Why".)	0	0	1	2	0	3	155	5th
5	Golden Child	Beginning	1	0	2	2	1	0	320	4th
6	Verivery	Face It	1	1	2	0	2	0	340	3rd
7	Oneus	Phantom of ONEUS (Note: Based on "The Phantom of the Opera". Included sample of their song "Twilight".)	0	0	0	2	3	1	145	6th

Round 1: Song of King (Episodes 2 & 3)
#	Artist	Song	Self-evaluation Ranking & Points Breakdown							R1 Score (Note: The 1st placed boy group gets the full 10,000 points, and the remaining boy groups will get points based on the proportion of their points to the points of the 1st placed boy group.)	R1 Rank
#	Artist	Song	1st	2nd	3rd	4th	5th	6th	Total	R1 Score	R1 Rank
1	Oneus	"Warrior's Descendant" (전사의 후예) (by H.O.T.)	1	1	1	4	12	17	725	2,417	7th
2	TOO	"Rising Sun" (순수) (by TVXQ)	3	5	6	5	11	6	1,510	5,033	4th
3	Verivery	"Mansae" (만세) (by Seventeen)	0	1	5	9	6	15	935	3,117	6th
4	Golden Child	"T.O.P" (by Shinhwa)	0	1	2	19	12	2	1,210	4,033	5th
5	ONF	"Everybody" (by Shinee)	12	7	12	2	1	2	2,590	8,633	3rd
6	Pentagon	"Very Good" (by Block B)	12	12	10	2	0	0	2,840	9,467	2nd
7	The Boyz	"Danger" (괴도) (by Taemin)	14	15	6	1	0	0	3,000	10,000	1st

Round 2: My Song (Episodes 3 & 4)
#	Artist	Song	Self-Evaluation (3,000)		Online Audience (7,000)		TOTAL (10,000)	
#	Artist	Song	Points	Subscore (Note: After proportioning, such that the 1st placed boy group gets the full points.)	Votes	Subscore	R2 Total Score (Note: Rounded to the nearest number)	R2 Rank
1	Pentagon (Note: Last performance to feature member Jinho.)	"Shine" (빛나리) + "Spring Snow" (봄눈)	2,670	2,881.29	43	3,858.97	6,740	5th
2	ONF	"The 사랑하게 될 거야 (The We Must Love)" ("We Must Love" (사랑하게 될 거야) + "Moscow Moscow") (Note: Performance special guest: YooA (Oh My Girl))	2,080	2,244.60	67	6,012.82	8,257	3rd
3	Golden Child	"Wannabe" (Note: Included sample of Caprice No.24 by Paganini, played by member Joochan on the violin.)	745	803.96	40	3,589.74	4,394	7th
4	Oneus	"Lit" (가자)	1,890	2,039.57	72	6,461.54	8,501	2nd
5	Verivery	"Photo"	1,645	1,775.18	65	5,833.33	7,609	4th
6	TOO	"Magnolia" (매그놀리아)	1,000	1,079.14	46	4,128.21	5,207	6th
7	The Boyz	"Reveal" (Note: Under the title "Reveal (Catching Fire)".)	2,780	3,000	78	7,000	10,000	1st

Cumulative Scores & Ranking (Rounds 1-2)
Rank	Artist	R1 Score (10,000)	R2 Score (10,000)	Total Points (20,000)
1st	The Boyz	10,000	10,000	20,000
2nd	ONF	8,633	8,257	16,890
3rd	Pentagon	9,467	6,740	16,207
4th	Oneus	2,417	8,501	10,918
5th	Verivery	3,117	7,609	10,726
6th	TOO	5,033	5,207	10,240
7th	Golden Child	4,033	4,394	8,427

Eliminated

Round 3 (Part 1): Collaboration Round (Episodes 5 & 6)
#	Artists	Song	Total Points (Note: 5,000 for 1st place, 3,000 for 2nd place, and 1,000 for 3rd place.)	Ranking
1	Verivery; TOO	"On" (by BTS)	3,000	2nd
2	Pentagon (Note: Only members Hui, Kino and Wooseok were involved.); ONF (Note: Only members Hyojin, J-Us and Wyatt were involved.)	"Kill This Love" (by Blackpink)	5,000	1st
3	The Boyz (Note: Only members Sangyeon, Juyeon, New, Q and Sunwoo were involved.); Oneus	"Heroine" (주인공) (by Sunmi)	1,000	3rd

Cumulative Scores & Ranking (R1 - R3 Pt. 1)
Rank	Artist	R1 Score (10,000)	R2 Score (10,000)	R3 Pt. 1 Score (5,000)	Total Points (25,000)
1st	ONF	8,633	8,257	5,000	21,890
2nd	Pentagon	9,467	6,740	5,000	21,207
3rd	The Boyz	10,000	10,000	1,000	21,000
4th	Verivery	3,117	7,609	3,000	13,726
5th	TOO	5,033	5,207	3,000	13,240
6th	Oneus	2,417	8,501	1,000	11,918

Round 3 (Part 2): Your Song (Episodes 6 & 7)
#	Artist	Song	Self-Evaluation (3,000)		Online Audience (7,000)		TOTAL (10,000)	
#	Artist	Song	Points (Note: Six (6) members from each team will rank the other teams' performances (excluding their own) from 1st to 5th, with each ranking corresponding to a certain number of points (unrevealed).)	Subscore	Votes	Subscore	Total Score	Rank
1	Oneus	"Be Mine" (내꺼하자) (Note: Inspired by William Shakespeare's play "Romeo and Juliet".) (by Infinite)	60	1,621.62	53	5,300	6,922	4th
2	TOO	"Hard Carry" (하드캐리) (by GOT7)	91	2,459.46	20	2,000	4,459	6th
3	ONF	"It's Raining" (Note: Included sample of their song "Complete".) (by Rain)	111	3,000	70	7,000	10,000	1st
4	Pentagon	"Follow" (by Monsta X)	109	2,945.94	27	2,700	5,646	5th
5	Verivery	"gogobebe" (고고베베) (Note: Inspired by the musical fantasy film "Aladdin".) (by Mamamoo)	63	1,702.70	61	6,100	7,803	3rd
6	The Boyz	"Shangri-La" (도원경; 桃源境) (Note: Under the title "Quasi una fantasia".) (by VIXX)	106	2,864.86	69	6,900	9,765	2nd

Round 3 - Overall Scores & Ranking
Rank	Artist	Part 1 (Collaboration) (5,000)	Part 2 ("Your Song") (10,000)	Total Score (15,000)
1st	ONF	5,000	10,000	15,000
2nd	Verivery	3,000	7,803	10,803
3rd	The Boyz	1,000	9,765	10,765
4th	Pentagon	5,000	5,646	10,646
5th	Oneus	1,000	6,922	7,922
6th	TOO	3,000	4,459	7,459

1st + 2nd + 3rd Performances Combined Results
Rank	Artist	R1 + R2 (20,000)	R3 Score (15,000)	Total Score (35,000)
1st	ONF	16,890	15,000	31,890
2nd	The Boyz	20,000	10,765	30,765
3rd	Pentagon	16,207	10,646	26,853
4th	Verivery	10,726	10,803	21,529
5th	Oneus	10,918	7,922	18,840
6th	TOO	10,240	7,459	17,699

Eliminated

Finale Live Comeback Stages (Episode 8)
#	Artist	Song	Ranking (Digitals)
1	Oneus	"Come Back Home"	4th
2	Verivery	"Beautiful-x"	5th
3	The Boyz	"Checkmate"	1st
4	Pentagon	"Basquiat" (바스키아)	3rd
5	ONF	"New World" (신세계)	2nd
Special Performance
F5 (Note: Consists of Hui (Pentagon), Hyojin (ONF), Hyunjae (The Boyz), Yeonho (Verivery) and Seoho (Oneus))		"It's Okay" (괜찮아요) (Note: Originally by BtoB)	—N/a

== Elimination table ==
Color key:

- Eliminated in First Elimination
- Eliminated in Second Elimination
- Overall runner-up
- Finale winner and highest overall score; joins Kingdom

Contestant	Performances																				
Contestant	90 Seconds Performance (Note: Not included in the overall score.)		Song Of King		My Song		First Elimination (Note: Total of 1st and 2nd Performances.)		Collaboration		Your Song		Second Elimination (Note: Total of 1st, 2nd and 3rd Performances.)		Video Views + Digitals Points		Finale Live Votes		Total (Note: Excluding the 90 Seconds Performance Score.)		Overall Ranking
The Boyz	1st	560	1st	10,000	1st	10,000	1st	20,000	3rd	1,000	2nd	9,765	2nd	30,765	1st	30,000	1st	35,000	1st	95,765	1st
ONF	5th	155	3rd	8,633	3rd	8,257	2nd	16,890	1st	5,000	1st	10,000	1st	31,890	2nd	19,162	2nd	27,359	2nd	78,411	2nd
Pentagon	2nd	480	2nd	9,467	5th	6,740	3rd	16,207	1st	5,000	5th	5,646	3rd	26,853	3rd	16,374	3rd	17,133	3rd	60,360	3rd
Oneus	6th	145	7th	2,417	2nd	8,501	4th	10,918	3rd	1,000	4th	6,922	5th	18,840	4th	10,795	4th	10,503	4th	40,138	4th
Verivery	3rd	340	6th	3,117	4th	7,609	5th	10,726	2nd	3,000	3rd	7,803	4th	21,529	5th	6,490	5th	3,852	5th	31,871	5th
TOO	7th	135	4th	5,033	6th	5,207	6th	10,240	2nd	3,000	6th	4,459	6th	17,699							6th
Golden Child	4th	320	5th	4,033	7th	4,394	7th	8,427													7th

== Discography ==
=== Song of King Part 1 ===
Released on May 8, 2020
No.	Title	Lyrics	Music	Artist	Length
1.	"Everybody"	Jo Yoon-kyung; Hwang Hyun (MonoTree)	Thomas Troelsen; Coach & Sendo; (Note: Arranged by Hwang Hyun (MonoTree))	ONF	4:00
Total length:					4:00

=== Song of King Part 2 ===
Released on May 15, 2020
No.	Title	Lyrics	Music	Artist	Length
1.	"Very Good (Pentagon ver.)"	Zico; Hui; Wooseok	Zico; Pop Time; (Note: Arranged by Minit, Chiic and Hui)	Pentagon	3:24
Total length:					3:24

=== My Song Part 1 ===
Released on May 15, 2020
No.	Title	Lyrics	Music	Artist	Length
1.	"Shine + Spring Snow" (빛나리+봄눈)	Hui; Dawn; Yuto; Wooseok; Kino	Flow Blow; Hui; Dawn; Kino; Nathan; HoHo; (Note: Arranged by Minit and Hui)	Pentagon	3:18
Total length:					3:18

=== My Song Part 2 ===
Released on May 22, 2020
No.	Title	Lyrics	Music	Artist	Length
1.	"The We Must Love" (The 사랑하게 될 거야)	Hwang Hyun (MonoTree)	Hwang Hyun (MonoTree)	ONF	4:10
2.	"Wannabe (Sampling Paganini 24 Caprices No.24 In A Minor Op.1)"	BLSSD	BLSSD (Note: Arranged by DJ Kaesama)	Golden Child	4:14
3.	"Lit" (가자)	Kim Do-hoon; Lee Sang-ho; Inner Child (MonoTree); Ravn	Kim Do-hoon; Lee Sang-ho; Inner Child (MonoTree); (Note: Arranged by Lee Hoo-sang and Mingki)	Oneus	4:16
4.	"Photo"	Wkly	Carl Ryden; Cazzi Opeia; Ellen Berg Tollbom; Gabriel Brandes; (Note: Arranged by Coke paris)	Verivery	4:08
5.	"Magnolia" (매그놀리아)	Lee Seu-ran	Tyler Shamy (Note: Arranged by Yummy Tone (Big Sancho, Park Hae-il))	TOO	3:55
6.	"Reveal (Catching Fire)"	Hwang Yoo-bin	Drew Ryan Scott; Justin Reinstein; Phil Schwan; Sean Alexander; (Note: Arranged by Ohway! (Prismfilter))	The Boyz	4:07
Total length:					24:50

=== Your Song Part 1 ===
Released on June 5, 2020
No.	Title	Lyrics	Music	Artist	Length
1.	"Be Mine" (내꺼하자)	Song Soo-yoon; Ravn	Kim Seung-soo; Han Jae-ho; (Note: Arranged by Lee Hoo-sang, Mingki and Kim Young-hyun (Coco Tubu Father))	Oneus	3:41
2.	"Hard Carry"	earattack; Yoogeum	earattack; LISH; Yoogeum; (Note: Arranged by 13 (Score, Megatone, Luke))	TOO	3:54
3.	"It's Raining"	Park Jin-young; Hwang Hyun (MonoTree); Wyatt	Park Jin-young	ONF	3:40
Total length:					11:15

=== Your Song Part 2 ===
Released on June 12, 2020
No.	Title	Lyrics	Music	Artist	Length
1.	"Follow (PENTAGON Ver.)"	Seo Ji-eum; Brother Su; Jooheon; I.M	Daniel Kim; Willie Weeks; Andreas Öberg; Skylar Mones	Pentagon	4:06
2.	"gogobebe" (고고베베)	Kim Do-hoon; Solar; Moonbyul	Kim Gun-mo; Kim Do-hoon	Verivery	4:07
3.	"Quasi una fantasia (Note: Original title "Shangri-la")" (도원경 (桃源境))	Jung Il-ri; Ravi; Sunwoo	Devine Channel	The Boyz	4:05
Total length:					12:18

=== Road to Kingdom FINAL ===
Released on June 12, 2020
No.	Title	Lyrics	Music	Artist	Length
1.	"Come Back Home"	Park Woo-sang; Ravn; Leedo	Kim Do-hoon; Park Woo-sang; Lee Sang-ho; Inner Child (MonoTree); (Note: Arranged by Lee Sang-ho, Park Woo-sang, Lee Hoo-sang and Mingki)	Oneus	3:49
2.	"Beautiful-x"	Jinli (Full8loom); Glory Face (Full8loom)	Jinli (Full8loom), Jake K (ARTiffect); (Note: Arranged by Glory Face (Full8loom) and Jake K (ARTiffect))	Verivery	3:25
3.	"Checkmate"	Jo Yoon-kyung	Imazine; Nathan; Andreas Ohm; (Note: Arranged by Imazine and Nathan)	The Boyz	3:12
4.	"Basquiat" (바스키아)	Hui; Wooseok	Hui; Nathan; Wooseok; yunji; (Note: Arranged by Nathan and yunji)	Pentagon	3:18
5.	"New World" (신세계)	Hwang Hyun (MonoTree); Wyatt	Hwang Hyun (MonoTree); MK	ONF	3:54
Total length:					17:38

== Ratings ==
In the ratings below, the highest rating for the show will be in red and the lowest rating for the show will be in blue. Some of the ratings found have already been rounded off to 1 decimal place, as they are usually of lower rankings in terms of the day's ratings.

Ep. #	Original Airdate	Nielsen Korea Ratings Nationwide
1	April 30, 2020	0.5%
2	May 7, 2020	0.4%
3	May 14, 2020	0.4%
4	May 21, 2020	0.5%
5	May 28, 2020	0.3%
6	June 4, 2020	0.6%
7	June 11, 2020	0.3%
8	June 18, 2020	0.4%

== Sequel ==
On October 29, 2020, Mnet confirmed the sequel of the show titled Kingdom: Legendary War (킹덤: 레전더리 워), and was aired on April 1, 2021.

On April 24, 2024 Mnet confirmed that season 2 of the show will be produced, and would air by the second half of the year. Road to Kingdom: Ace of Ace would air from September 19.
