= Verivery =

South Korean boy group

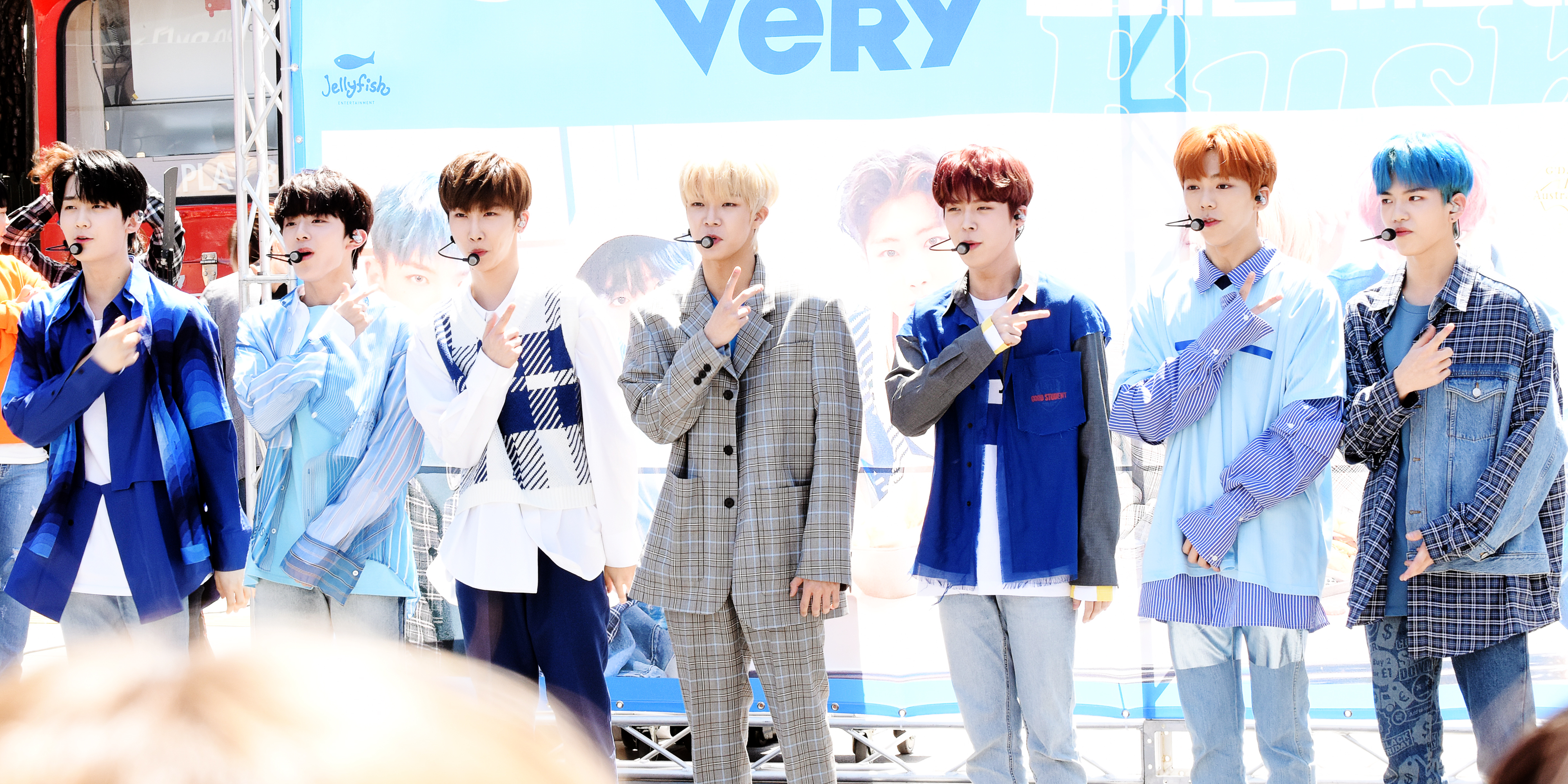
- Verivery busking in Sinchon, May 2019

Background information
- Origin: Seoul, South Korea
- Genre: K-pop
- Years active: 2018–present
- Labels: Jellyfish; Polydor Japan
- Members: Dongheon; Hoyoung; Minchan; Gyehyeon; Yeonho; Yongseung; Kangmin
- Website: Official website

Verivery (Korean: 베리베리; stylized in all caps and also abbreviated VRVR) is a South Korean boy band formed by Jellyfish Entertainment in 2018. The group consists of seven members: Dongheon, Hoyoung, Minchan, Gyehyeon, Yeonho, Yongseung, and Kangmin. They debuted on January 9, 2019, with the extended play (EP) Veri-Us.

They self-produce their albums and have created several music videos directed and edited by Minchan, along with Verivery members. The group has explained that they take inspiration from other artist's performances, while Gyehyeon describes their process as Minchan drawing from "all the member's various ideas under his leadership".

== History ==
=== 2018: Pre-debut ===
On August 23, 2018, Jellyfish confirmed that they would be debuting a seven member boy group and later confirmed their name as Verivery, Jellyfish Entertainment's first boy group in six years since VIXX. Their name comes from the Latin word 'veri' meaning 'truth' and the English word 'very', Verivery is a combination of the words ‘various', 'energetic', 'real' and 'innovation'.

Prior to their debut, Mnet revealed that the upcoming group would star in the reality show named Now Verivery: Real Road Movie. On September 21, 2018, the OST "Super Special" for their reality show, as well as its music video, was released along with the debut of the reality show.

On November 9, the group released the DIY MV of Now Verivery OST "Super Special".

=== 2019–2020: Debut with Veri series, Face It series and survival show ===
On January 9, 2019, the group officially debuted with their first extended play Veri-Us and its lead single "Ring Ring Ring". On February 24, the group released their DIY music video of Veri-Us album for the title song "Ring Ring Ring".

On April 24, Verivery released their second extended play Veri-Able and its lead single "From Now". On June 1, the group released their DIY music video of Veri-Able album for the title song "From Now". On July 7, the group made their first overseas performance, performing "From Now" at K-CON 2019 in New York.

On July 31, Verivery released their first single album Veri-Chill and its lead single "Tag Tag Tag". On September 11, the groups released the DIY music video of Veri-Chill album for the combined song "Tag Tag Tag & 반할 수밖에 (Mystery Light)". On August 17–18, Verivery performed "Tag Tag Tag" at K-CON 2019 in Los Angeles.

On January 7, 2020, Verivery released their third extended play Face Me and its lead single "Lay Back". The EP marks as the first series of the FACE it trilogy. On February 17, the group released the DIY music video for the b-side songs of Face Me album titled "Paradise & Photo".

On March 20, 2020, the group was confirmed to join Mnet's reality television competition Road to Kingdom. They released "Beautiful-X" for the show's finale, they placed fifth overall. The group has shared that the show helped them improve their performance abilities, saying they "were determined to become a more hardworking Verivery."

On July 1, 2020, Verivery released their fourth extended play Face You and its lead single "Thunder". On August 8, the group released the DIY music video for the combined title track and b-side song "Connect & Thunder" of Face You album.

On October 13, 2020, Verivery released their fifth extended play Face Us and its lead single "G.B.T.B. (Go Beyond The Barrier)". They also released a DIY music video for the song "So Gravity" from Face Us album on December 28. On October 26, it was announced that Minchan would be going on a hiatus due to poor health and anxiety issues. On October 27, the lead single "G.B.T.B." would reach #1 on Billboard's World Digital Song Sales.

On December 23, the group released their first holiday track "Love at First Sight".

=== 2021–2023: Series 'O', Japanese debut, Liminality – EP, and members hiatus ===
On March 2, the group released their second single album Series 'O' Round 1: Hall and its lead single "Get Away". They shared that this new era, stepping away from the FACE it series, would show more maturity and their "dreamy and critical sexiness that [fans have] never seen before." The group also explained that Series O' Round 1: Hall describes them "enjoying a crazy party at the invitation of someone." The lead single, "Get Away" would then go on to top Billboard's World Digital Song Sales chart for two weeks straight.

On June 1, it was announced that, after seven months of absence, Minchan would be returning to group activities.

On August 23, the group released their sixth extended play, Series 'O' Round 2: Hole and its lead single "Trigger".

Verivery announced their first U.S. tour, taking place from December 5–20, 2021. The shows in Cleveland, Harrisburg, and New York City were cancelled due to Yongseung testing positive for COVID-19.

On March 23, 2022, the group released the digital single "Series 'O' Round 0: Who" and its lead single "O".

On April 25, 2022, the group released their first full-length album Series 'O' Round 3: Whole and its lead single "Undercover".

On June 22, 2022, the group made their Japanese debut with the single "Undercover (Japanese ver.)".

On July 14, 2022, it was announced that Verivery had confirmed their first solo concert Page:0 in Seoul on August 20 and 21. Later on July 22, they announced Page:0 in US and Latin Amerika from September to October.

On November 14, 2022, the group released their third single album, Liminality – EP.Love, with the lead single "Tap Tap". Later on November 23, the group successfully took home their first ever music show win with "Tap Tap" on MBC M's Show Champion. Just two days later, on November 25, VERIVERY would then earn their second music show win for "Tap Tap" on KBS' Music Bank. Shortly thereafter, Minchan went on a second hiatus due to health-related reasons.

Verivery released their seventh mini album Liminality – EP.Dream with its lead single "Crazy Like That" on May 16, 2023.

On May 22, 2023, Verivery announced their first fan-concert DREAM SHOP to be held in Seoul, Tokyo, and Taipei from June 24 to July 22.

On August 23, 2023, Jellyfish Entertainment announced that Dongheon would be enlisting for his mandatory military service start from August 28, 2023 as an active soldier.

On October 30, 2023, Hoyoung decided to take a temporary hiatus due to health concerns.

=== 2025: Boys II Planet and contract renewal ===
In June 2025, it was announced that Dongheon, Gyehyeon and Kangmin would be participating in the Mnet survival show Boys II Planet. In the first episode, all three received the ranking "All Star" from the judges, the highest possible ranking. Dongheon and Gyehyeon were eliminated in the first survival announcement, finishing in 37th and 49th respectively. Kangmin was eliminated in the finale, finishing in 9th, a rank away from making it into the final line-up.

On October 17, it was announced that all members, excluding Hoyoung and Minchan, had renewed their contract with Jellyfish Entertainment, extending their original contract which was due to end in 2026.

== Members ==
On August 28, 2023, Dongheon became the first member of the group to participate in mandatory military enlisting in the 102nd Armored Brigade.

Adapted from their Naver profile.

- Dongheon (동헌) - leader
- Hoyoung (호영)
- Minchan (민찬)
- Gyehyeon (계현)
- Yeonho (연호)
- Yongseung (용승)
- Kangmin (강민)

== Discography ==
=== Studio albums ===
Title	Album details	Peak chart positions	Sales
Title	Album details	KOR	Sales
Series 'O' Round 3: Whole	Released: April 25, 2022; Label: Jellyfish Entertainment; Formats: CD, digital download, streaming; Track listing: 1. "Moment" (틈); 2. "Undercover"; 3. "Coming Over"; 4. "Wish U Were Here"; 5. "Candle" (모든 순간들의 널 축하해); 6. "O"; 7. "Fallin'"; 8. "Childhood"; 9. "Emotion"; 10. "Velocity"; 11. "Our Spring" (잠깐, 봄); 12. "Fine"; 13. "Thank You, Next?" (CD only)	3	KOR: 86,295

=== Extended plays ===
Title	EP details	Peak chart positions		Sales
Title	EP details	KOR	JPN	Sales
Veri-Us	Released: January 9, 2019; Label: Jellyfish Entertainment; Formats: CD, digital download, streaming; Track listing: 1. "Ring Ring Ring" (불러줘); 2. "Flower"; 3. "F.I.L"; 4. "Alright"; 5. "Super Special" (Acoustic ver.)	4	—	KOR: 24,080
Veri-Able	Released: April 24, 2019; Label: Jellyfish Entertainment; Formats: CD, digital download, streaming; Track listing: 1. "From Now" (딱 잘라서 말해); 2. "Love Line"; 3. "All I Do" (나 집에 가지 않을래); 4. "Get Ready"; 5. "Light Up" (밝혀줘); 6. "Thank You, Next?" (CD only)	6	—	KOR: 17,630
Face Me	Released: January 7, 2020; Label: Jellyfish Entertainment; Formats: CD, digital download, streaming; Track listing: 1. "Photo"; 2. "Lay Back"; 3. "Paradise"; 4. "Curtain Call"; 5. "Moment"; 6. "Thank You, Next?" (CD only)	4	—	KOR: 28,440
Face You	Released: July 1, 2020; Label: Jellyfish Entertainment; Formats: CD, digital download, streaming; Track listing: 1. "Thunder"; 2. "Connect"; 3. "Skydive"; 4. "Beautiful-x"; 5. "Privacy" (사생활); 6. "Thank You, Next?" (CD only)	8	34	KOR: 39,626
Face Us	Released: October 13, 2020; Label: Jellyfish Entertainment; Formats: CD, digital download, streaming; Track listing: 1. "G.B.T.B. (Go Beyond the Barrier)"; 2. "My Face"; 3. "Hold Me Tight"; 4. "Get Outta My Way"; 5. "Gravity" (소중력); 6. "Thank You, Next?" (CD only)	7	—	KOR: 50,704
Series 'O' Round 2: Hole	Released: August 23, 2021; Label: Jellyfish Entertainment; Formats: CD, digital download, streaming; Track listing: 1. "Trigger"; 2. "Underdog"; 3. "Prom"; 4. "Heart Attack"; 5. "Thank You, Next?" (CD only)	2	43	KOR: 81,597; JPN: 1,169
Liminality – EP.Dream	Released: May 16, 2023; Label: Jellyfish Entertainment; Formats: CD, digital download, streaming; Track listing: 1. "Crazy Like That"; 2. "Juicy Juicy"; 3. "Raincoat"; 4. "Smile with You ()"	4	—	KOR: 95,235
Confetti	Released: September 7, 2026; Label: Jellyfish Entertainment; Formats: CD, digital download, streaming	8	30	KOR: 121,533; JPN: 1,349

=== Single albums ===
Title	Album details	Peak chart positions	Sales
Title	Album details	KOR	Sales
Veri-Chill	Released: July 31, 2019; Label: Jellyfish Entertainment; Formats: CD, digital download, streaming; Track listing: 1. "Tag Tag Tag"; 2. "Mystery Light" (반할 수밖에); 3. "Thank You, Next?" (CD only)	10	KOR: 16,698
Series 'O' Round 1: Hall	Released: March 2, 2021; Label: Jellyfish Entertainment; Formats: CD, digital download, streaming; Track listing: 1. "Get Away"; 2. "Numbness"; 3. "Thank You, Next?" (CD only)	4	KOR: 67,767
Liminality – EP. Love	Released: November 14, 2022; Label: Jellyfish Entertainment; Formats: CD, digital download, streaming; Track listing: 1. "Tap Tap"; 2. "Motive"; 3. "Thank You, Next?" (CD only)	3	KOR: 139,545
Lost and Found	Released: December 1, 2025; Label: Jellyfish Entertainment; Formats: CD, digital download, streaming; Track listing: 1. "Red (Beggin')"; 2. "Empty"; 3. "Blame Us"	1	KOR: 150,249
Japanese
Tap Tap (Japanese ver.)	Released: March 22, 2023; Label: Universal J; Formats: CD, digital download, streaming; Track listing: 1. "Tap Tap" (Japanese ver.); 2. "Love Line" (Japanese ver.); 3. "So Gravity" (Japanese ver.)	11	JPN: 9,083
Undercover (Japanese ver.)	Released: June 22, 2022; Label: Universal J; Formats: CD, digital download, streaming; Track listing: 1. "Undercover" (Japanese ver.); 2. "O" (Japanese ver.); 3. "Get Away" (Japanese ver.); 4. "TRIGGER" (Japanese ver.)	12	JPN: 8,031

=== Singles ===
Title	Year	Peak chart positions				Album
Title	Year	KOR DL	JPN	US Dig.	US World	Album
Korean
"Ring Ring Ring" (불러줘)	2019	—	—	—	—	Veri-Us
"From Now" (딱 잘라서 말해)	2019	—	—	—	—	Veri-Able
"Tag Tag Tag"	2019	—	—	—	—	Veri-Chill
"Lay Back"	2020	—	—	—	—	Face Me
"Beautiful-x"	2020	—	—	—	—	Face You
"Thunder"	2020	—	—	—	—	Face You
"G.B.T.B. (Go Beyond the Barrier)"	2020	—	—	44	1	Face Us
"Get Away"	2021	153	—	44	1	Series 'O' Round 1: Hall
"Trigger"	2021	147	—	—	4	Series 'O' Round 2: Hole
"O"	2022	147	—	—	—	Series 'O' Round 3: Whole
"Undercover"	2022	67	12	—	—	Series 'O' Round 3: Whole
"Tap Tap"	2022	13	11	—	—	Liminality – EP. Love
"Crazy Like That"	2023	55	—	—	—	Liminality – EP. Dream
"Red (Beggin')"	2025	10	—	—	—	Lost and Found
"Don't Panic"	2026	—	—	—	—	Confetti
Japanese
"Undercover" (Japanese)	2022	—	11	—	—	Non-album singles
"Tap Tap" (Japanese)	2023	—	12	—	—	Non-album singles
"—" denotes releases that did not chart or were not released in that region.

=== Soundtrack appearances ===
Title	Year	Album
"My Beauty" (Note: Credited as a song by Verivery, but sung by Minchan, Gyehyeon, and Yeonho.)	2019	Extraordinary You OST Part 2
"With Us"	2020	Itaewon Class OST Part 9
"Rum Pum" (Note: Sung and credited as a song by Yeonho.)	2022	The World of My 17 Season 2 OST Part 2
"By Your Side" (Note: Sung and credited as a song by Yeonho.)	2023	My 20th Twenty OST Part 3

=== Other songs ===
Year	Title	Album	Notes
2019	"Magic Hour" (Note: Magic Hour is a song by a game character group called trinityACE, which consists of the Elsword's characters Elsword, Chung, and Add)	Magic Hour - trinityACE (Vocal. VERIVERY)	Vocal by Verivery and credited as trinityACE debut song
2020	"Photo"	Road to Kingdom - My Song (나의 노래) Part 2 and Face Me	Original song by Verivery
2020	"고고베베 (gogobebe)"	Road to Kingdom - Your Song (너의 노래) Part 2	Original song by Mamamoo
2020	"Beautiful-X"	Road to Kingdom Final and Face You	Original song by Verivery
2020	"Love at First Sight (첫 눈이 와)"	Available on YouTube and SoundCloud	Original song by Verivery
2022	"Christmas Day"	1ST D.I.Y Single Album SERENATA: Slow and Steady	Available on YouTube and SoundCloud
2022	"It's You"	1ST D.I.Y Single Album SERENATA: Slow and Steady	Available on YouTube and SoundCloud

== Filmography ==
=== Reality shows ===
- Now Verivery: Real Road Movie (지금부터베리베리해) (Mnet, 2018)

=== Music videos ===
Title	Year	Director(s)
"Super Special"	2018	GDW
"Ring Ring Ring"	2019	GDW
"딱 잘라서 말해 (From Now)"	2019	GDW
"Tag Tag Tag"	2019	Digipedi
"Lay Back"	2020	Digipedi
"Thunder"	2020	Digipedi
"G.B.T.B."	2020	Digipedi
"Get Away"	2021	Flexible Pictures
"Trigger"	2021	Flexible Pictures
"O"	2022	Flexible Pictures
"Undercover"	2022	Flexible Pictures
"Tap Tap"	2022	Flexible Pictures
"Crazy Like That"	2023	Flexible Pictures

=== DIY Music videos ===
Title	Year	Director
"Super Special"	2018	Minchan
"Ring Ring Ring"	2019	Minchan
"딱 잘라서 말해 (From Now)"	2019	Minchan
"Tag Tag Tag & 반할 수밖에"	2019	Minchan
"Paradise & Photo"	2020	Minchan
"Connect & Thunder"	2020	Minchan
"So Gravity"	2020	Minchan

== Concerts and tours ==
=== 2021 VERIVERY 1st TOUR IN U.S. ===
Date	City	Country	Venue	Ref
December 5, 2021	Los Angeles	United States	The Vermont Hollywood	
December 6, 2021	Tempe	United States	Marquee Theater	
December 9, 2021	Dallas	United States	South Side Music Hall	
December 10, 2021	Houston	United States	Warehouse Live	
December 12, 2021	St. Louis	United States	Red Flag	
December 15, 2021	Fort Wayne	United States	Piere's	

==== Cancelled shows ====
Date	City	Country	Venue	Reason	Ref
December 17, 2021	Cleveland	United States	Agora Theatre and Ballroom	Yongseung testing positive for COVID-19	
December 19, 2021	Harrisburg	United States	HMAC	Yongseung testing positive for COVID-19	
December 20, 2021	New York City	United States	Sony Hall	Yongseung testing positive for COVID-19	

=== 2022 VERIVERY CONCERT PAGE:0 ===
Date	City	Country	Venue	Ref
August 20, 2022	Seoul	South Korea	Kwangwoon University Donghae Arts Center	
August 21, 2022	Seoul	South Korea	Kwangwoon University Donghae Arts Center	
September 14, 2022	Boston	United States	The Cabot	
September 15, 2022	New Haven	United States	Toad's Place	
September 17, 2022	Bethlehem	United States	Musikfest Café	
September 18, 2022	New York City	United States	Sony Hall	
September 21, 2022	Atlanta	United States	Center Stage	
September 22, 2022	Orlando	United States	The Plaza Live	
September 24, 2022	Covington	United States	Madison Theater	
September 26, 2022	Chicago	United States	Concord Music Hall	
September 28, 2022	Minneapolis	United States	Skyway Theatre	
September 30, 2022	Lawrence	United States	Granada Theater	
October 2, 2022	Dallas	United States	House of Blues	
October 5, 2022	San Antonio	United States	Vibes Center Event	
October 7, 2022	Los Angeles	United States	The Vermont	
October 9, 2022	San Francisco	United States	The Midway	
October 14, 2022	Santiago	Chile	Teatro Coliseo	
October 16, 2022	Mexico City	Mexico	Auditorio BB	
January 27, 2023	Osaka	Japan	Zepp Namba	
January 29, 2023	Tokyo	Japan	Zepp Haneda	
February 19, 2023	Taipei	Taiwan	Clapper Studio	

=== 2023 VERIVERY FAN-CONCERT DREAM SHOP ===
Date	City	Country	Venue	Ref
June 24, 2023	Seoul	South Korea	Bluesquare Mastercard Hall	
June 25, 2023	Seoul	South Korea	Bluesquare Mastercard Hall	
July 2, 2023	Tokyo	Japan	Shinagawa Intercity Hall	
July 22, 2023	Taipei	Taiwan	Clapper Studio	

=== 2024 VERIVERY FAN-MEETING TOUR GO ON ===
Date	City	Country	Venue	Ref
May 12, 2024	Seoul	South Korea	Yonsei University Centennial Memorial Hall	
May 25, 2024	Hongkong	China	Axa Dreamland, Go Park	
June 1, 2024	Tokyo	Japan	Shinagawa Intercity Hall	
June 14, 2024	New York City	United States	Brooklyn Steel	
June 16, 2024	Chicago	United States	Copernicus Center	
June 18, 2024	Minneapolis	United States	Skyway Theater	
June 20, 2024	Atlanta	United States	Center Stage	
June 21, 2024	Fort Worth	United States	Ridglea Theatre	
June 23, 2024	Los Angeles	United States	Vermont Hollywood	
July 6, 2024	Taipei	Taiwan	Westar	

== Awards and nominations ==
Name of the award ceremony, year presented, category, nominee of the award, and the result of the nomination
Award ceremony	Year	Category	Nominee / Work	Result	Ref.
Genie Music Award	2019	Male New Artist Award	Verivery	Nominated	
Asia Artist Awards	2022	Best Icon Award	Verivery	Won	
Hanteo Music Awards	2023	Focus Star Award	Verivery	Won	
Japan Gold Disc Awards	2023	Best 3 New Artists (Asian)	Verivery	Won	
