= Malus (EP) =

- Digital cover

EP by Oneus
- Released: September 5, 2022
- Recorded: 2022
- Genre: K-pop
- Length: 22:40
- Label: RBW

Oneus chronology
Trickster (2022)	Malus (2022)	Dopamine (2022)

Singles from Malus
- 1. "Same Scent" Released: September 5, 2022

Music video
- "Same Scent" on YouTube

Malus is the eighth extended play by South Korean boy band Oneus. It was released by RBW and distributed by Kakao Entertainment on September 5, 2022. The EP contains seven tracks, including the lead single, "Same Scent". Malus debuted atop the Circle Album Chart, with over 201,000 copies sold of its physical, Poca and Meta versions. This album marks their final release with Ravn as his departure from the group was announced on October 27, 2022.

== Background and release ==
On August 16, Oneus announced that they would make a comeback on September 5 with Malus.

== Critical reception ==
NME described "Same Scent" as "new tropical house", penchant for incorporating traditional Korean instruments and culture into both their songs and videos.

On September 13, the group earned their first music show win with "Same Scent" on SBS M's The Show. On September 14, the group earned their second music show win with "Same Scent" on MBC M's Show Champion.

=== Year-end lists ===
Critic/publication	List	Track	Rank	Ref.
Dazed	The best K-pop tracks of 2022	"Same Scent"	29	
Teen Vogue	The 79 Best K-Pop Songs of 2022	"Same Scent"	Placed	

== Track listing ==
Malus track listing
No.	Title	Lyrics	Music	Arrangement	Length
1.	"Intro: Eden"	Lee Sang-ho (RBW); Seo Yong-bae (RBW); Lee Ho-sang (RBW); Marvel J; Leedo; Choi Ye-rim	Lee Sang-ho (RBW); Seo Yong-bae (RBW); Lee Ho-sang (RBW)	Seo Yong-bae (RBW); Lee Ho-Sang (RBW)	2:00
2.	"Same Scent"	Lee Sang-ho (RBW); Seo Yong-bae (RBW); Lee Ho-sang (RBW); Inner Child (MonoTree); Ravn; Leedo	Lee Sang-ho (RBW); Seo Yong-bae (RBW); Lee Ho-sang (RBW); Inner Child (MonoTree)	Lee Sang-ho (RBW); Seo Yong-bae (RBW); Lee Ho-sang (RBW)	3:19
3.	"Stupid Love"	Ravn; Lee do; Oneway	Ravn; Oneway	Oneway	3:10
4.	"Gravitation" (두 눈 빠지도록)	Lee Sang-ho (RBW); Seo Yong-bae (RBW); Lee Ho-sang (RBW); Ravn; Leedo	Lee Sang-ho (RBW); Seo Yong-bae (RBW); Lee Ho-sang (RBW)	Lee Sang-ho (RBW); Seo Yong-bae (RBW); Lee Ho-sang (RBW)	3:40
5.	"Mermaid"	Kim Do-hoon (RBW); Lee Sang-ho (RBW); Seo Yong-bae (RBW); Ravn; Leedo	Kim Do-hoon (RBW); Lee Sang-ho (RBW); Seo Yong-bae (RBW); Ravn	Kim Do-hoon (RBW); Lee Sang-ho (RBW); Seo Yong-bae (RBW)	3:45
6.	"Full Moon"	Park Hyun-kyu (Vromance); Seoho; Ravn; Leedo	Jin Min-ho (RBW); Park Hyun-kyu (Vromance); Seoho; Leedo	Jin Min-ho (RBW)	3:20
7.	"Same Scent" (English ver.)	Cosmic Sound (RBW); Cosmic Girl	Cosmic Sound (RBW); Cosmic Girl	Cosmic Sound (RBW); Cosmic Girl	3:22
Total length:					23:56

== Charts ==
=== Weekly charts ===
Weekly chart performance for Malus
Chart (2022)	Peak position
South Korean Albums (Circle)	1

=== Monthly charts ===
Monthly chart performance for Malus
Chart (2022)	Peak position
South Korean Albums (Circle)	5

=== Year-end charts ===
Year-end chart performance for Malus
Chart (2022)	Position
South Korean Albums (Circle)	71

== Release history ==
Release history and formats for Malus
Region	Date	Format	Label
South Korea	September 5, 2022	CD; digital download; streaming	RBW; Kakao Entertainment
Various	September 5, 2022	Digital download; streaming	RBW; Kakao Entertainment
