= Trickster (EP) =

- Digital cover

EP by Oneus
- Released: May 17, 2022
- Recorded: 2022
- Genre: K-pop
- Length: 22:40
- Label: RBW

Oneus chronology
Blood Moon (2021)	Trickster (2022)	Malus (2022)

Singles from Trickster
- 1. "Bring It On" Released: May 17, 2022

Music video
- "Bring It On" on YouTube

Trickster is the seventh extended play by South Korean boy band Oneus. It was released by RBW and distributed by Kakao Entertainment on May 17, 2022. The EP contains seven tracks, including the lead single, "Bring It On".

== Background and release ==
In February 2022, Oneus began their US tour, with twelve stops including major cities such as New York City and Los Angeles and smaller cities such as Wilkes-Barre and Lawrence.

In April, Oneus announced two stops to continue their Blood Moon tour, holding their third Japanese concert with a show in Chiba and in Osaka. They also announced a comeback with their seventh EP Trickster, which was released May 17 along with the lead single "Bring It On".

== Track listing ==
Trickster track listing
No.	Title	Lyrics	Music	Arrangement	Length
1.	"Intro: Who Got the Joker?"	Lee Sang-ho (RBW); Seo Yong-bae (RBW); Lee Ho-sang (RBW); Marvel J; Leedo; Choi Ye-rim	Lee Sang-ho (RBW); Seo Yong-bae (RBW); Lee Ho-sang (RBW)	Seo Yong-bae (RBW); Lee Ho-Sang (RBW)	2:00
2.	"Bring It On" (덤벼)	Lee Sang-ho (RBW); Seo Yong-bae (RBW); Lee Ho-sang (RBW); Inner Child (MonoTree); Ravn; Leedo	Lee Sang-ho (RBW); Seo Yong-bae (RBW); Lee Ho-sang (RBW); Inner Child (MonoTree)	Lee Sang-ho (RBW); Seo Yong-bae (RBW); Lee Ho-sang (RBW)	3:19
3.	"Skydivin'"	Ravn; Leedo; Oneway	Ravn; Oneway	Oneway	3:10
4.	"Firebomb" (두 눈 빠지도록)	Lee Sang-ho (RBW); Seo Yong-bae (RBW); Lee Ho-sang (RBW); Ravn; Leedo	Lee Sang-ho (RBW); Seo Yong-bae (RBW); Lee Ho-sang (RBW)	Lee Sang-ho (RBW); Seo Yong-bae (RBW); Lee Ho-sang (RBW)	3:40
5.	"Fragile" (취급주의)	Kim Do-hoon (RBW); Lee Sang-ho (RBW); Seo Yong-bae (RBW); Ravn; Leedo	Kim Do-hoon (RBW); Lee Sang-ho (RBW); Seo Yong-bae (RBW); Ravn	Kim Do-hoon (RBW); Lee Sang-ho (RBW); Seo Yong-bae (RBW)	3:45
6.	"Mr. Wolf"	Park Hyun-kyu (Vromance); Seoho; Ravn; Leedo	Jin Min-ho (RBW); Park Hyun-kyu (Vromance); Seoho; Leedo	Jin Min-ho (RBW)	3:20
7.	"Bring It On" (English ver.)	Cosmic Sound (RBW); Cosmic Girl	Cosmic Sound (RBW); Cosmic Girl	Cosmic Sound (RBW); Cosmic Girl	3:22
Total length:					23:56

== Charts ==
=== Weekly charts ===
Chart performance for Trickster
Chart (2022)	Peak position
Japanese Albums (Oricon)	5
South Korean Albums (Gaon)	2

=== Monthly charts ===
Monthly chart performance for Trickster
Chart (2022)	Peak position
Japanese Albums (Oricon)	16
South Korean Albums (Gaon)	8

=== Year-end charts ===
Year-end chart performance for Trickster
Chart (2022)	Position
South Korean Albums (Circle)	57

== Release history ==
Release history and formats for Trickster
Region	Date	Format	Label
South Korea	May 17, 2022	CD; digital download; streaming	RBW; Kakao Entertainment
Various	May 17, 2022	Digital download; streaming	RBW; Kakao Entertainment
