= Devil (Oneus album) =

Album by Oneus

Studio album by Oneus
- Released: January 19, 2021
- Genre: K-pop
- Label: RBW

Oneus chronology
Lived (2020)	Devil (2021)	Binary Code (2021)

Singles from Devil
- 1. "Bbusyeo" Released: December 1, 2020; 2. "No Diggity" Released: January 19, 2021

Devil is the first studio album by South Korean boy group Oneus. It was released by RBW and distributed by Kakao Entertainment on January 19, 2021.

== Background and release ==
Devil is Oneus's first full-length studio album, released with the lead single "No Diggity". The album also includes the previously released single "Bbusyeo", originally released December 1, 2020.

== Critical reception ==
Kat Moon included the album in "The Best K-Pop Songs and Albums of 2021" for Time. Moon said of Devil that while the album intends to continue the fantastical story elements of their previous release, Lived, the album's highlight is "the facet most grounded in reality—specifically, messages about humankind’s universal race against time", specifically naming "Youth", "Incomplete", and "Rewind" as the songs that exemplify this.

== Commercial performance ==
The album peaked at number 2, number 6, and number 86 for the weekly, monthly, and yearly Circle Album Chart respectively. In 2021, the album sold 123,380 copies in South Korea. The album re-entered the Circle Album Chart in 2025, peaking at number 13 on the weekly chart.

== Track listing ==
No.	Title	Lyrics	Music	Arrangement	Length
1.	"Intro: Devil Is in the Detail"	Lee Sang-ho; Seo Yong-bae; Lee Hoo-sang; Ravn; Leedo	Lee Sang-ho; Seo Yong-bae; Lee Hoo-sang	Lee Hoo-sang	1:33
2.	"No Diggity" (반박불가)	Lee Sang-ho; Seo Yong-bae; Lee Hoo-sang; Inner Child	Lee Sang-ho; Seo Yong-bae; Lee Hoo-sang; Inner Child	Lee Sang-ho; Seo Yong-bae; Lee Hoo-sang	3:31
3.	"Leftover" (식은 음식)	Kim Min-gi; Ravn; Seoho; Leedo	Kim Min-gi; Ravn; Seoho	Kim Min-gi	3:29
4.	"Incomplete" (완벽하지 않아도 괜찮아)	Lee Sang-ho; Seo Yong-bae; Lee Hoo-sang; Inner Child; Ravn; Leedo	Lee Sang-ho; Seo Yong-bae; Lee Hoo-sang; Inner Child; Runy	Lee Sang-ho; Seo Yong-bae; Lee Hoo-sang	3:22
5.	"Youth"	Jeon Da-Woon; B.O.; Ravn; Seoho; Leedo	Jeon Da-Woon; B.O.	Jeon Da-Woon; B.O.	3:39
6.	"Bbusyeo" (뿌셔)	Lee Sang-ho; Seo Yong-bae; Inner Child; Ravn; Leedo	Lee Sang-ho; Seo Yong-bae; Inner Child	Lee Sang-ho; Seo Yong-bae	3:14
7.	"Rewind" (우리의 시간은 거꾸로 흐른다)	Lee Sang-ho; Seo Yong-bae; Lee Hoo-sang; Kim Min-gi; Inner Child; Ravn; Leedo	Lee Sang-ho; Seo Yong-bae; Lee Hoo-sang; Kim Min-gi; Inner Child	Lee Sang-ho; Seo Yong-bae; Lee Hoo-sang; Kim Min-gi	3:13
8.	"Lion Heart"	Kim Min-gi; Inner Child; J.Door	Kim Min-gi; Inner Child; J.Door	Kim Min-gi; J.Door	3:12
9.	"What You Doing?"	Adam H Evans; Cosmic Girl (Yoo Jooyi); Ravn; Leedo	Adam H Evans; Cosmic Girl (Yoo Jooyi)	Adam H Evans; Cosmic Girl (Yoo Jooyi)	3:27
10.	"I.P.U" (눈부시게 빛이 나던 그날)	Lee Sang-ho; Seo Yong-bae; Lee Hoo-sang; Ravn; Leedo	Lee Sang-ho; Seo Yong-bae; Lee Hoo-sang	Lee Sang-ho; Seo Yong-bae; Lee Hoo-sang	3:33
11.	"Outro: Connect with Us"	Lee Sang-ho; Seo Yong-bae; Lee Hoo-sang	Lee Sang-ho; Seo Yong-bae; Lee Hoo-sang	Lee Sang-ho; Seo Yong-bae; Lee Hoo-sang	1:06
Total length:					33:19

== Charts ==
=== Album ===
==== Weekly charts ====
Chart performance for Devil
Chart (2021)	Peak position
South Korean Albums (Circle)	2

==== Monthly charts ====
Chart performance for Devil
Chart (2021)	Position
South Korean Albums (Circle)	6

==== Year-end charts ====
Chart performance for Devil
Chart (2021)	Position
South Korean Albums (Circle)	86

=== Songs ===
==== Weekly charts ====
Chart performance for "No Diggity"
Chart (2021)	Peak position
Japanese Singles (Oricon)	9
South Korea (Circle)	146
US World Digital Songs (Billboard)	18

== Release history ==
Release history and formats for Binary Code
Region	Date	Format	Label
South Korea	January 19, 2021	CD; digital download; streaming	RBW; Kakao Entertainment
Various	January 19, 2021	Digital download; streaming	RBW; Kakao Entertainment

== Certification and sales ==
Region	Certification	Certified units/Sales
Album
South Korea (KMCA)	—	132,467
