= Blood Moon (EP) =

- Digital version cover

EP by Oneus
- Released: November 9, 2021
- Recorded: 2021
- Genre: K-pop
- Length: 22:40
- Label: RBW

Oneus chronology
Binary Code (2021)	Blood Moon (2021)	Trickster (2022)

Singles from Blood Moon
- 1. "Luna" Released: November 9, 2021

Music video
- "Luna" on YouTube

Blood Moon is the sixth extended play by South Korean boy band Oneus. It was released by RBW and distributed by Kakao Entertainment on November 9, 2021. The EP contains seven tracks, including the lead single, "Luna".

== Background and release ==
Prior to the release of the EP, Oneus held an online and offline concert, "Oneus Theatre: Blood Moon", in Seoul from November 6 to 7.

On November 9, the group released their sixth EP Blood Moon, with the lead single "Luna".

== Critical reception ==
Billboard described "Luna" as "the celebration of classic and modern-day sounds" by "blending of traditional instrumentation with dreamy synthesizers", and similarly NME described "Luna" as "a homecoming of sorts", balancing between old and new with "gayageum strings warbling over trap beats touched by ’80s synthwave".

On November 17, the group earned their first music show win of their career with "Luna" on MBC M's Show Champion.

=== Year-end lists ===
Critic/publication	List	Track	Rank	Ref.
Billboard	25 Best K-Pop Songs of 2021: Critics’ Picks	"Luna"	4	
NME	25 Best K-pop songs of 2021	"Luna"	25	
Genius	The Genius Community's 50 Best Songs of 2021	"Luna"	17	

== Track listing ==
Blood Moon track listing
No.	Title	Lyrics	Music	Arrangement	Length
1.	"Intro: Window" (Intro: 창 (窓: Window); featuring Choi Ye-rim)	Lee Sang-ho (RBW); Seo Yong-bae (RBW); Lee Ho-sang (RBW); Marvel J; Leedo; Choi Ye-rim	Lee Sang-ho (RBW); Seo Yong-bae (RBW); Lee Ho-sang (RBW)	Seo Yong-bae (RBW); Lee Ho-Sang (RBW)	2:00
2.	"Luna" (월하미인 (月下美人: Luna))	Lee Sang-ho (RBW); Seo Yong-bae (RBW); Lee Ho-sang (RBW); Inner Child (MonoTree); Ravn; Leedo	Lee Sang-ho (RBW); Seo Yong-bae (RBW); Lee Ho-sang (RBW); Inner Child (MonoTree)	Lee Sang-ho (RBW); Seo Yong-bae (RBW); Lee Ho-sang (RBW)	3:19
3.	"Yes or No" (사랑의 결말은 모 아니면 도)	Ravn; Leedo; Oneway	Ravn; Oneway	Oneway	3:10
4.	"Life Is Beautiful"	Lee Sang-ho (RBW); Seo Yong-bae (RBW); Lee Ho-sang (RBW); Ravn; Leedo	Lee Sang-ho (RBW); Seo Yong-bae (RBW); Lee Ho-sang (RBW)	Lee Sang-ho (RBW); Seo Yong-bae (RBW); Lee Ho-sang (RBW)	3:40
5.	"Shut Up 받고 Crazy Hot!"	Kim Do-hoon (RBW); Lee Sang-ho (RBW); Seo Yong-bae (RBW); Ravn; Leedo	Kim Do-hoon (RBW); Lee Sang-ho (RBW); Seo Yong-bae (RBW); Ravn	Kim Do-hoon (RBW); Lee Sang-ho (RBW); Seo Yong-bae (RBW)	3:45
6.	"We're in Love" (헤엄쳐)	Park Hyun-kyu (Vromance); Seoho; Ravn; Leedo	Jin Min-ho (RBW); Park Hyun-kyu (Vromance); Seoho; Leedo	Jin Min-ho (RBW)	3:20
7.	"Who You Are"	Cosmic Sound (RBW); Cosmic Girl	Cosmic Sound (RBW); Cosmic Girl	Cosmic Sound (RBW); Cosmic Girl	3:22
Total length:					22:40

== Charts ==
=== Album ===
==== Weekly charts ====
Chart performance for Blood Moon
Chart (2021)	Peak position
Japanese Albums (Oricon)	45
South Korean Albums (Gaon)	2

==== Monthly charts ====
Chart performance for Blood Moon
Chart (2021)	Position
South Korean Albums (Gaon)	8

==== Year-end charts ====
Chart performance for Blood Moon
Chart (2021)	Position
South Korean Albums (Gaon)	64

=== Songs ===
==== Weekly charts ====
Chart performance for "Luna" (월하미인 (月下美人: Luna))
Chart (2021)	Peak position
South Korea (Gaon)	119

== Release history ==
Release history and formats for Blood Moon
Region	Date	Format	Label
South Korea	November 9, 2021	CD; digital download; streaming	RBW; Kakao Entertainment
Various	November 9, 2021	Digital download; streaming	RBW; Kakao Entertainment

== Certification and sales ==
Region	Certification	Certified units/Sales
Album
Japan	—	1,223
South Korea (KMCA)	—	177,877
