= Oneus =

South Korean boy band

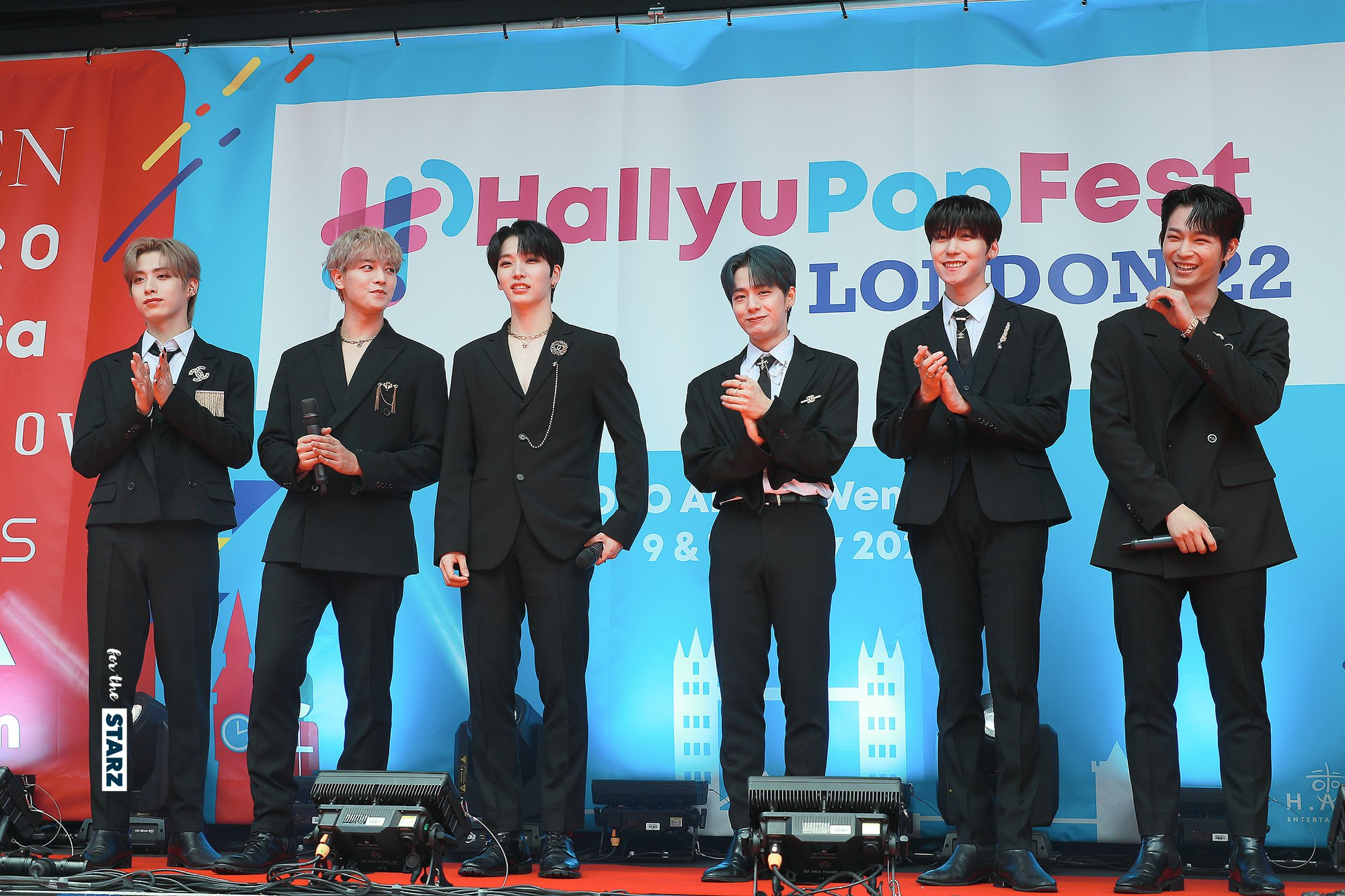
- Oneus in July 2022; L–R: Xion, Ravn (former), Seoho, Hwanwoong, Keonhee, and Leedo

Background information
- Origin: Seoul, South Korea
- Genre: K-pop
- Years active: 2019–present
- Labels: B.Wave; RBW
- Members: Seoho; Leedo; Keonhee; Hwanwoong; Xion
- Past members: Ravn
- Website: Official website

Oneus (Korean: 원어스, pronounced as "One Us") is a South Korean boy band formed by RBW. The group consists of five members: Seoho, Leedo, Keonhee, Hwanwoong and Xion. The group originally had six members, including Ravn, who left in October 2022. The group released their debut extended play Light Us on January 9, 2019.

== History ==
=== 2017–2018: Pre-debut and formation ===
Individual members of Oneus came out of various trainee programs. Seoho (then known as Gunmin), Keonhee, and Hwanwoong were trainees for RBW in the second season of Produce 101 during the first half of 2017, and Ravn and Seoho were trainees for RBW on the YG survival show Mix Nine during the second half of 2017. Leedo also participated in Mix Nine as an independent trainee, but did not pass the first audition.

RBW started a pre-debut project "RBW Trainee Real Life – We Will Debut" in late 2017 to showcase the label's promising male trainees. Produce 101 frontrunners Keonhee and Hwanwoong were the first to join the lineup. In December 2017, they participated in the second chapter 'Special Party' with their label-mates MAS. In early 2018, Keonhee and Hwanwoong, with the addition of Ravn and Seoho, were introduced as pre-debut team RBW Boyz, and Leedo and Xion were added in March 2018. They were renamed Oneus in June 2018. On September 27, Oneus and their label-mates Onewe (formerly MAS) released a pre-debut single "Last Song".

=== 2019–2020: Debut and early days ===
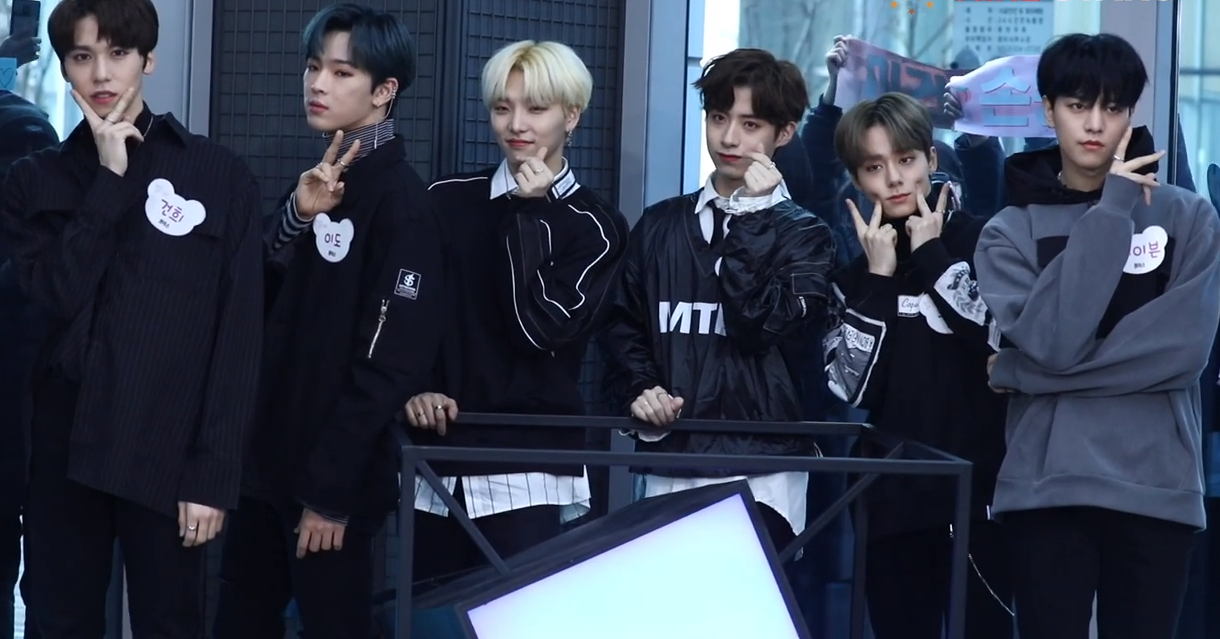
Oneus in 2019

The group's debut EP Light Us was released on January 9, with "Valkyrie" serving as its lead single. The single charted in the top ten of several countries' iTunes charts, including at number one in the U.S. and Australia, as well as at number fifteen on Billboard's World Digital Song Sales chart. Oneus released their second EP Raise Us on May 29, with the lead single titled "Twilight". Releasing a Japanese version of the single on August 27, Oneus made their official Japanese debut. The Japanese version of "Twilight" sold more than 60,000 copies by October. The group also held their first concert in Japan, 2019 Oneus Japan 1st Live: 光差, with shows at Osaka's Zepp Namba on July 28 and Tokyo's Zepp DiverCity on August 25. In August, the group won the "Next Artist Award" at the 2019 Soribada Best K-Music Awards. Oneus released their third EP Fly with Us on September 30, with the lead single titled "Lit". Following the release of the EP, they held their first tour in the U.S., also called Fly With Us, in November 2019. The tour made stops in six cities: New York, Chicago, Atlanta, Dallas, Minneapolis, and Los Angeles. On December 18, they had their first Japanese comeback with the single "808". "808" debuted at number 1 on the Oricon Daily Single Chart with 3,662 copies sold on the first day of release.

On January 10, 2020, Oneus held a fan-meeting in honor of their one-year anniversary, called Our Moment, at Yes 24 Live Hall in Seoul. In early February, Oneus had a second concert series in Japan, Fly With Us Final, performing in Osaka on February 8 and 9 and in Chiba on February 15 and 16. The concert had 2,200 in attendance in Osaka and 3,800 in attendance in Chiba. On March 20, it was announced that the group would join Mnet's reality television competition Road to Kingdom. For the show's finale on June 12, Oneus released their song "Come Back Home" and finished in fourth place overall. On March 24, the group released their first single album called In Its Time with the lead single "A Song Written Easily". The song was the group's third single to chart on Billboard's World Digital Song Sales chart, ranking the highest of the three singles at number eleven. On August 19, the group released their fourth EP Lived, with the lead single "To Be Or Not To Be". On December 1, the group released their first digital single "Bbusyeo".

=== 2021-2022: Devil, Binary Code, Blood Moon, Trickster, Malus, and Ravn's departure ===
On January 19, the group released their first studio album Devil, which consisted of eleven tracks, including the lead single "No Diggity".

On May 11, their fifth EP Binary Code was released, with the lead single "Black Mirror". The EP also contained a rock version of their debut song "Valkyrie".

It was announced that Oneus would be holding an online and offline concert "Oneus Theatre: Blood Moon" in Seoul from November 6 to 7. On November 9, the group released their sixth EP Blood Moon, with the lead single "Luna". On November 17, the group earned their first music show win of their career with "Luna" on MBC M's Show Champion.

On December 21, Oneus released a new collaboration single with Onewe titled "Stay".

In February 2022, Oneus began their U.S. tour with twelve stops, including major cities such as New York City and Los Angeles and smaller cities such as Wilkes-Barre and Lawrence. In April, Oneus announced two stops to continue their Blood Moon tour, holding their third and fourth Japanese concerts with shows in Chiba and Osaka. They also announced the release of their seventh EP Trickster on May 17, with the lead single "Bring It On". On June 1, RBW released the poster "2022 Oneus Japan 1st Fanmeeting 'Summer'" through ONEUS's official SNS; this was a Japanese fan meeting event that was held on June 25 and July 3. On August 16, they announced the upcoming release of their eighth EP, Malus on September 5. In October, Oneus announced their first world tour, scheduled to begin on October 29, on which they would travel to Japan and America. On October 17, due to reports of inappropriate behavior, RBW announced the temporary suspension of Ravn's activities until a fact check could be completed. Later on October 27, RBW announced that after consideration, Ravn had made the decision to voluntarily leave the group, making Oneus a five-member group.

=== 2023–2024: Pygmalion, La Dolce Vita, Road to Kingdom: Ace of Ace, and special album announcement ===
On April 13, 2023, RBW confirmed that Oneus planned to release their ninth EP in early May. Later on April 17, Oneus announced their ninth EP Pygmalion, scheduled to release on May 8. The EP contains five tracks, including the lead single "Erase Me," and it also marked their first release as a five-member group. On September 5, Oneus was announced to release their tenth EP La Dolce Vita on September 26. On September 12, they released teaser image to announce their upcoming second world tour with the same name of their tenth EP; this tour was planned to include travel to Japan, Europe, and America.

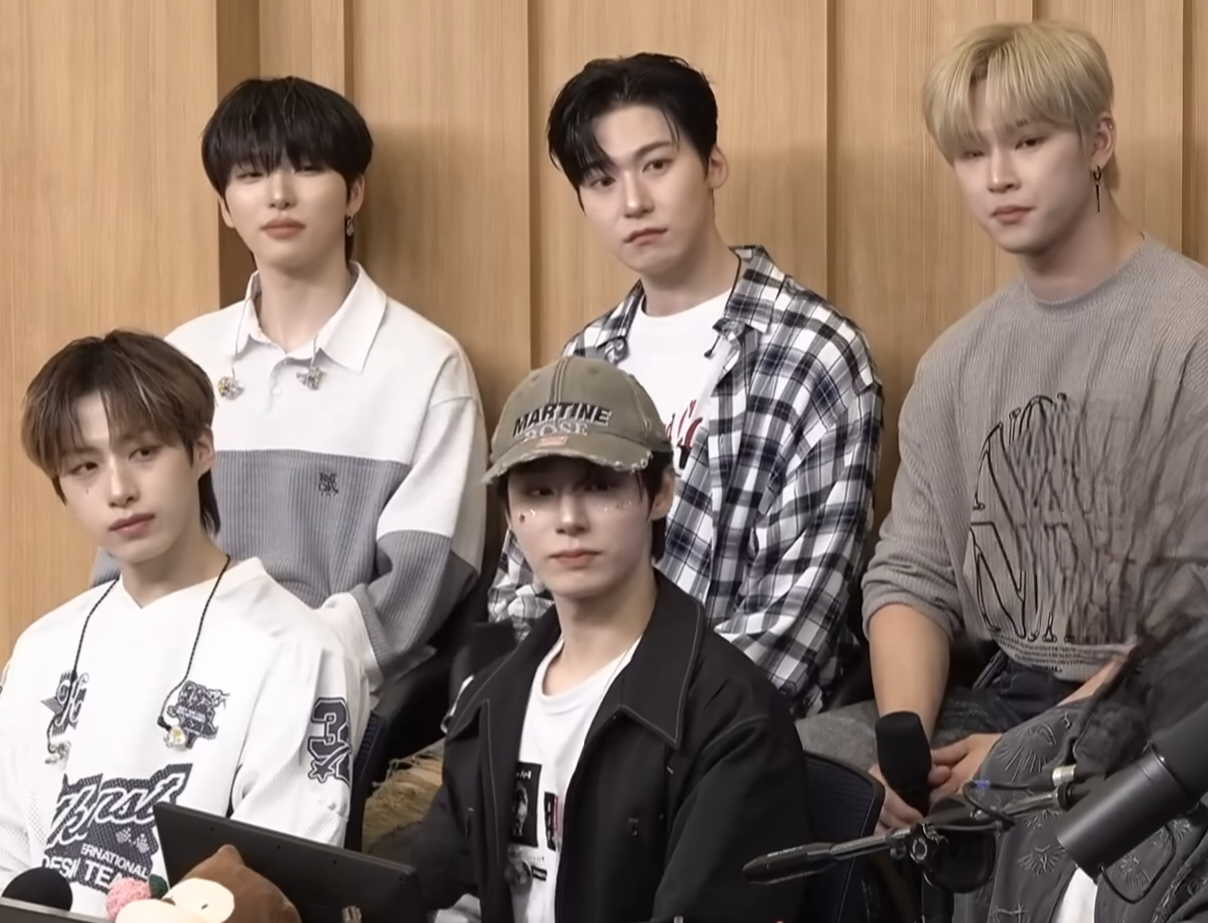
Oneus in 2024

On May 19, 2024, Oneus released the new digital single "Now", a remake song of girl group Fin.K.L's "Now" (2000).

On June 28, 2024, Oneus was reported to appear as contestants on Mnet's Road to Kingdom: Ace of Ace. For the show's finale on November 7, Oneus released their song "I Know You Know" and finished in second place overall.

On December 4, 2024, Oneus announced they would be releasing a special album in January 2025.

=== 2025–present: Dear. M, Seoho military enlistment, solo tracks, 5x, departure from RBW, and new agency. ===
On January 14, 2025, Oneus released their first special album Dear.M. The album title Dear.M means Dear Moon, which can be interpreted as To TOMOON (fandom name). The album contains 17 tracks, including the lead single "IKUK," a newly arranged version of their finale live comeback song "I Know You Know" from Road to Kingdom: Ace of Ace. On February 17, Seoho enlisted as an active-duty soldier to fulfill his mandatory military service.

Oneus members each released their own singles through RBW over the course of 2025 Releasing on the 23rd of March member Seoho dropped his first solo track "Hatchling" alongside the music video for the track. On April 8th, Oneus member Keonhee released the solo single "I Just Want Love" in addition to performing the song Keonhee also contributed many of its lyrics. On April 22nd, group member Leedo released his single "Sun Goes Down" which features artist YongYong. On May 6th, Xion of Oneus released the music video and single track "Camellia" on multiple music platforms. On May 29th, to end the solo track series for Oneus members, member Hwanwoong released his solo track "Radar". After each member released their own single, on June 30th, Oneus released their eleventh mini album 5x which features five tracks and its lead single "X"

In January 2026, RBW announced that Oneus' contract with the label will end in February but their group activities will still continue. On February 5, it was announced that Oneus had signed a contract with the newly established entertainment company B.Wave Entertainment.

On August 16, Seoho was officially discharged from military service.

== Members ==
Adapted from Naver.

Current

- Seoho (서호)
- Leedo (이도)
- Keonhee (건희)
- Hwanwoong (환웅)
- Xion (시온)

Former

- Ravn (레이븐)

== Discography ==
=== Studio albums ===
Title	Details	Peak chart positions		Sales
Title	Details	KOR	JPN	Sales
Devil	Released: January 19, 2021; Label: RBW; Formats: CD, digital download, streaming	2	—	KOR: 132,467
Dopamine	Released: November 23, 2022; Label: Kiss Entertainment; Formats: CD, digital download, streaming; Track listing: 1. "Dopamine"; 2. "Katoki" (過渡期); 3. "Don't Know Why"; 4. "Same Scent" (Japanese version); 5. "Bring It On" (Japanese version); 6. "A Song Written Easily" (Japanese version); 7. "To Be or Not to Be" (Japanese version); 8. "Leader"; 9. "Dopamine" (Instrumental)	—	8	JPN: 5,415
Dear.M	Released: January 14, 2025; Label: RBW; Formats: Digital download, streaming; Track listing: 1. "IKUK"; 2. "We Are Young"; 3. "Devilish Love"; 4. "W"; 5. "Rupert's Drop" (루퍼트의 눈물); 6. "Valkyrie" (발키리; Penta Ver.); 7. "Twilight" (태양이 떨어진다; Penta Ver.); 8. "Lit" (가자; Penta Ver.); 9. "A Song Written Easily" (쉽게 쓰여진 노래; Penta Ver.); 10. "To Be or Not to Be" (Penta Ver.); 11. "Bbusyeo" (Penta Ver.); 12. "No Diggity" (반박불가; Penta Ver.); 13. "Black Mirror" (Penta Ver.); 14. "Life Is Beautiful" (Penta Ver.); 15. "Luna" (월하미인 (月下美人 : Luna); Penta Ver.); 16. "Bring It On" (덤벼; Penta Ver.); 17. "Same Scent" (Penta Ver.)	6	—	KOR: 28,443
"—" denotes releases that did not chart or were not released in that region.

=== Extended plays ===
Title	Details	Peak chart positions			Sales
Title	Details	KOR	JPN	US World	Sales
Light Us	Released: January 9, 2019; Label: RBW; Formats: CD, digital download, streaming; Track listing: 1. "Intro: Light Us"; 2. "ZigZag" (삐뚤빼뚤); 3. "Valkyrie" (발키리); 4. "Red Thread" (붉은 실); 5. "Eye Contact"; 6. "Hero"; 7. "Crazy & Crazy" (ㅁㅊㄷㅁㅊㅇ) (Prod. CyA)	6	—	—	KOR: 40,305
Raise Us	Released: May 29, 2019; Label: RBW; Formats: CD, digital download, streaming; Track listing: 1. "Intro: Time"; 2. "Twilight" (태양이떨어진다); 3. "English Girl"; 4. "BingBing" (개와 늑대의 시간); 5. "White Night" (백야(白夜)); 6. "Now"	4	—	—	KOR: 49,469
Fly with Us	Released: September 30, 2019; Label: RBW; Formats: CD, digital download, streaming; Track listing: 1. "Intro: Fly Me to the Moon"; 2. "Plastic Flower" (윙윙윙윙); 3. "Lit" (가자); 4. "Blue Sky"; 5. "Level Up"; 6. "Stand By"	4	—	15	KOR: 50,476; JPN: 2,441
Lived	Released: August 19, 2020; Label: RBW; Formats: CD, digital download, streaming; Track listing: 1. "Intro: Lived"; 2. "To Be or Not to Be"; 3. "Dead or Alive"; 4. "Dizzy" (흔란하다 흔란해); 5. "Airplane"; 6. "Come Back Home"	5	—	—	KOR: 110,863
Binary Code	Released: May 11, 2021; Label: RBW; Formats: CD, digital download, streaming	2	36	—	KOR: 108,241
Blood Moon	Released: November 9, 2021; Label: RBW; Formats: CD, digital download, streaming	2	45	—	KOR: 177,877; JPN: 1,223
Trickster	Released: May 17, 2022; Label: RBW; Formats: CD, digital download, streaming	2	5	—	KOR: 244,543; JPN: 14,802
Malus	Released: September 5, 2022; Label: RBW; Formats: CD, digital download, streaming	1	—	—	KOR: 238,803
Pygmalion	Released: May 8, 2023; Label: RBW; Formats: CD, digital download, streaming; Track listing: 1. "Intro: Lethe"; 2. "Erase Me"; 3. "Unforgettable" (잇다있다잊었다); 4. "Echo"; 5. "Halley's Comet" (반짝임 그 찰나의 너)	4	—	—	KOR: 239,298
La Dolce Vita	Released: September 26, 2023; Label: RBW; Formats: CD, digital download, streaming; Track listing: 1. "Intro: Beggin' You"; 2. "Baila Conmigo"; 3. "Simulation"; 4. "Epilogue" (미리보기); 5. "Baila Conmigo" (Spanish version)	2	31	7	KOR: 220,021; JPN: 1,444
5x	Released: July 3, 2025; Label: RBW; Formats: CD, digital download, streaming; Track listing: 1. "X"; 2. "Love Me or Loser"; 3. "Reload"; 4. "Bad"; 5. "Time Machine" (Korean version)	11	—	—	KOR: 48,118
First Light: 井	Released: September 23, 2026; Label: B.Wave Entertainment; Formats: CD, digital download, streaming; Track listing: 1. "Runaway"; 2. "Say Yes!" (눈을 돌리지마); 3. "By Chance"; 4. "Never Ending Us"; 5. "We Run for Youth"	17	—	—	KOR: 22,773
"—" denotes releases that did not chart or were not released in that region.

=== Single albums ===
Title	Album details	Peak chart positions	Sales
Title	Album details	KOR	Sales
In Its Time	Released: March 24, 2020; Label: RBW; Formats: CD, digital download, streaming; Track listing: 1. "A Song Written Easily" (쉽게 쓰여진 노래); 2. "Hide and Seek" (꼭꼭 숨어라)	5	KOR: 48,751
原	Released: January 20, 2026; Label: RBW; Formats: CD, digital download, streaming; Track listing: 1. "Grenade"; 2. "Stop & Move"; 3. "When You're Close to Me"	11	KOR: 17,888

=== Singles ===
==== As lead artist ====
Title	Year	Peak chart positions				Sales	Album
Title	Year	KOR	JPN	JPN Hot	US World	Sales	Album
Korean
"Valkyrie" (발키리) (Note: "Valkyrie (Japanese version)" was included on CD single "Twilight" (japanese version) as a B-side track on August 7, 2019.)	2019	—	—	—	15	—N/a	Light Us
"Twilight" (태양이떨어진다) (Note: "Twilight (Japanese ver.)" was released on August 07, 2019 in Japan as CD single.)	2019	—	4	17	—	JPN: 34,549 (Phy.)	Raise Us
"Lit" (가자)	2019	—	—	—	14	—N/a	Fly with Us
"A Song Written Easily" (쉽게 쓰여진 노래)	2020	—	—	—	11	—N/a	In Its Time
"To Be or Not to Be"	2020	— (Note: "To Be or Not to Be" did not enter the Gaon Digital Chart, but peaked at number 20 on the Gaon Download Chart.)	—	—	—	—N/a	Lived
"Bbusyeo" (뿌셔)	2020	— (Note: "Bbusyeo" did not enter the Gaon Digital Chart, but it peaked at number 95 on the Gaon Download Chart.)	—	—	—	—N/a	Devil
"No Diggity" (반박불가) (Note: "No Diggity" was released on March 24, 2021 in Japan as their CD single.)	2021	146	9	—	18	—N/a	Devil
"Black Mirror" (Note: "Black Mirror" was released on August 25, 2021 in Japan as their CD single.)	2021	134	17	—	—	—N/a	Binary Code
"Shut Up 받고 Crazy Hot!"	2021	— (Note: "Shut Up 받고 Crazy Hot!" did not enter the Gaon Digital Chart, but it peaked at number 156 on the Gaon Download Chart.)	—	—	22	—N/a	Blood Moon
"Life Is Beautiful"	2021	— (Note: "Life Is Beautiful" did not enter the Gaon Digital Chart, but it peaked at number 197 on the Gaon Download Chart.)	—	—	17	—N/a	Blood Moon
"Luna" (월하미인 (月下美人: Luna))	2021	119	—	—	—	—N/a	Blood Moon
"Bring It On" (덤벼)	2022	150	—	—	—	—N/a	Trickster
"Same Scent"	2022	115	—	—	—	—N/a	Malus
"Erase Me"	2023	141	—	—	—	—N/a	Pygmalion
"Baila Conmigo"	2023	— (Note: "Baila Conmigo" did not enter the Circle Digital Chart, but peaked at number 10 on the component Download Chart.)	—	—	—	—N/a	La Dolce Vita
"Now" (Fin.K.L cover)	2024	— (Note: "Now" did not enter the Circle Digital Chart, but peaked at number 45 on the component Download Chart.)	—	—	—	—N/a	Non-album singles
"Rupert's Drop" (루퍼트의 눈물)	2024	— (Note: "Rupert's Drop" did not enter the Circle Digital Chart, but peaked at number 92 on the component Download Chart.)	—	—	—	—N/a	Non-album singles
"IKUK"	2025	— (Note: "IKUK" did not enter the Circle Digital Chart, but peaked at number 16 on the component Download Chart.)	—	—	—	—N/a	Dear.M
"X"	2025	— (Note: "X" did not enter the Circle Digital Chart, but peaked at number 38 on the component Download Chart.)	—	—	—	—N/a	5x
"Grenade"	2026	— (Note: "Grenade" did not enter the Circle Digital Chart, but peaked at number 21 on the component Download Chart.)	—	—	—	—N/a	原
"Say Yes!"	2026	—	—	—	—	—N/a	First Light: 井
Japanese
"Twilight" (태양이떨어진다) (Note: "Twilight (Japanese ver.)" was released on August 07, 2019 in Japan as CD single.) (Japanese)	2019	—	4	17	—	JPN: 34,549 (Phy.)	Non-album singles
"808" (Note: "808" was released on December 18, 2019 in Japan as their CD single.)	2019	—	3	15	—	JPN: 40,380 (Phy.)	Non-album singles
"Dopamine"	2020	—	8	—	—		Dopamine
"No Diggity" (Japanese)	2021	—	9	—	—		Non-album singles
"Black Mirror" (Japanese)	2021	—	17	—	—		Non-album singles
"Time Machine"	2025	—	—	—	—		Non-album singles
"Under"	2026	—	4	69	—	JPN: 13,793	Non-album singles
"—" denotes releases that did not chart or were not released in that region.

==== Collaborations ====
Title	Year	Peak chart positions	Album
Title	Year	KOR Down.	Album
"Last Song" (with Onewe)	2018	—	We Will Debut
"Stay" (with Onewe)	2021	133	Non-album single
"—" denotes releases that did not chart or were not released in that region.

=== Other songs ===
Title	Year	Album	Notes
"Koisii"	2019	Included in "Twilight"	Japanese CD single
"Kiseki"	2019	Included in "Twilight"	Japanese CD single
"A Thousand Stars"	2019	Included in "808"	Japanese CD single
"Lost"	2019	Included in "808"	Japanese CD single
"In My Arms"	2019	Included in "808"	Japanese CD single
"Be Mine"	2020	Included in Road to Kingdom – Your Song Part 1	Original song by Infinite
"Come Back Home"	2020	Included in Road to Kingdom Final and Lived	Original song by Oneus
"Shut Up 받고 Crazy Hot!" (English ver.)	2021	Included on digital release (Oneus Theatre Project)	Original song by Oneus
"Life Is Beautiful" (English ver.)	2021	Included on digital release (Oneus Theatre Project)	Original song by Oneus
"I Know You Know"	2024	Included in Road to Kingdom: Ace of Ace <Finale>	Original song by Oneus

== Filmography ==
=== Reality shows ===
Year	Title	Note
2020–present	Show Me The MWM	2 Seasons; 8 Episodes
2020	Stand by Oneus	15 Episodes; Japanese broadcast
2020	Road to Kingdom	8 Episodes
2018	Power Up! Beautiful snack bar is open	8 Episodes - Cast alongside Onewe
2018	RBW Trainee Real Life – I shall Debut S2	20 Episodes - Cast alongside Onewe
2017-2018	RBW Trainee Real Life – I shall Debut S1	11 Episodes - Cast alongside Onewe
2024	Road to Kingdom: Ace of Ace	8 Episodes

=== Web dramas ===
Year	Title	Note
2021	K-Campus Life	1 Episode

=== Hosting ===
Year	Title	Note
2019	韓ON! BOX!!	30 episodes; Japanese broadcast

== Concerts and tours ==
=== Headlining tours ===
- Fly With Us (2019)
- Blood Moon (2022)
- 1st World Tour 'Reach For Us' (2022–2023)
- 2nd World Tour 'La Dolce Vita' (2023–2024)
- 3rd World Tour 'Full Moon' (2026-2027)

=== Concerts ===
- 2019 Oneus Japan 1st Live : 光差！
- Oneus Special Live 'Fly With Us' (2019)
- 2020 Oneus Japan 2nd Live : Fly With Us
- Oneus Theater : Red Moon Map | Blood Moon (2021)
- 2022 Oneus Japan 3rd Live : Blood Moon

== Awards and nominations ==
Name of the award ceremony, year presented, edition, category, nominee of the award, and the result of the nomination
Award ceremony	Year	Category	Nominee(s) / Work(s)	Result	Ref.
Asia Artist Awards	2021	Male Idol Group Popularity Award	Oneus	Nominated	
FAN N STAR	2019	Rising Star Awards	Oneus	Won	
Golden Disc Awards	2021	Best Album Award - Bonsang	Blood Moon	Nominated	
Golden Disc Awards	2021	Seezn Most Popular Artist Award	Oneus	Nominated	
Seoul Music Awards	2021	U+Idol Live Best Artist Award	Oneus	Nominated	
Seoul Music Awards	2022	Bonsang Award	Malus	Nominated	
Seoul Music Awards	2022	Popularity Award	Oneus	Nominated	
Seoul Music Awards	2022	Hallyu Special Award	Oneus	Nominated	
Soribada Best K-Music Awards	2019	Next Artist Award	Oneus	Won	
Soribada Best K-Music Awards	2020	The New Icon Award	Oneus	Won	
