= 2018 KBS Song Festival =

South Korean annual music festival

- Also known as: KBS Gayo Daechukje
- Presented by: EXO's Chanyeol; Twice's Dahyun; BTS's Jin
- Starring: BTS; Wanna One; Red Velvet; Seventeen; GFriend; BtoB; Apink; Hwang Chi Yeol; Sunmi; Chungha; Norazo; Oh My Girl (G)I-DLE; EXO; Twice; AOA; VIXX; Nu'est W GOT7; Monsta X NCT 127; Highlight's Yong Jun Hyung; 10cm Roy Kim; Lovelyz; Momoland; Cosmic Girls; Kim Yeon Ja; Celeb Five; The Boyz

Production
- Production locations: KBS Hall; Seoul, South Korea
- Production company: Korean Broadcasting System

Original release
- Network: KBS 2TV; KBS World
- Release: December 28, 2018

The 2018 KBS Song Festival was the 9th edition of KBS Song Festival, held on December 28, 2018, broadcast live from KBS Hall by the Korean Broadcasting System.

This year's theme was "a huge fantastical party".

== Broadcast ==
On December 11, 2018, KBS announced that the festival would take place on December 28, 2018, at 8:30p.m. KST, also revealing the first lineup of artists as: BTS, Wanna One, Red Velvet, Seventeen, GFriend, BtoB, Apink, Hwang Chi Yeol, Sunmi, Chung Ha, Norazo, Oh My Girl, and I-dle. This year's theme is "a huge fantastical party" and expects to meet the 200% of the public's fantasies in a unique stage never seen before

On December 13, a second lineup of artists was revealed: EXO, Twice, AOA, Vixx, NU'EST W, GOT7, Monsta X, NCT, Highlight's Yong Jun Hyung, 10cm, Roy Kim, Lovelyz, and Momoland. It was also revealed that the event's MCs would be EXO's Chanyeol, Twice's Dahyun, and BTS's Jin.

On December 20, the third and final lineup was revealed: WJSN (Cosmic Girls), Kim Yeon Ja, and Celeb Five. It was revealed that JYP and SM would create special stages.

== Performers ==
Artist(s)	Song(s)
Celeb Five Cosmic Girls	"Shutter" "I Wanna Be A Celeb"
The Boyz	"No Air"
(G)I-dle	"Latata" (Remix)
Momoland	"Bboom Bboom" (Mix Ver.) "Baam"
NCT 127	"Simon Says" "Regular"
Chungha	"Do It" "Love U" "Rollercoaster"
BtoB	"Beautiful Pain"
Cosmic Girls	"Save Me, Save You"
Hwang Chi Yeol	"The Only Star"
Special Stage 1
Red Velvet's Yeri Lovelyz's Kei Gfriend's Umji Oh My Girl's Arin Twice's Dahyun (G)I-dle's Yuqi	"Kissing You" by Girls' Generation
Nu'est W	"Dejavu" "Help Me"
Special Stage 2
Red Velvet's Joy Lovelyz's Mijoo GFriend's Sowon Oh My Girl's Jiho Twice's Tzuyu Momoland's Yeonwoo	"Hush" by Miss A
Monsta X	"Shoot Out"
Sunmi Red Velvet's Seulgi Wanna One's Daehwi	"Heroine"
Sunmi	"Siren"
Norazo	"Super Curry Cider Man"
Oh My Girl	"Secret Garden" "Remember Me"
Special Stage 3
GOT7's Jinyoung Monsta X's Minhyuk NCT 127's Jaehyun Wanna One's Minhyun	"You are so Beautiful"
GFriend	"Time for the Moon Night"
Seventeen	"Thanks" "Getting Closer"
Roy Kim	"Only Then"
Roy Kim Wanna One's Kim Jaehwan	"Girl"
SM Special "SM The Greatest"
Hyoyeon Red Velvet	"Punk Right Now"
EXO's Kai NCT Dream's Jisung	"Hybrid"
NCT U	"7th Sense"
NCT Dream	"Go"
NCT U	"Boss"
Red Velvet	"Be Natural" "RBB (Really Bad Boy)"
EXO NCT U NCT Dream	"Monster"
JYP Special "JYP of All Time"
Stage 1. All Time
Twice's Jihyo Day6	"Coming Of Age Ceremony" by Park Ji-yoon
Day6	"Bad Guy" by Rain
Day6 Twice's Nayeon Stray Kids' Bang Chan	"Nobody" by Wonder Girls
Day6 Kim Woo-jin	"Again & Again" by 2PM
Day6 GOT7's Jay B Twice's Jihyo Twice's Nayeon Stray Kids' Bang Chan Kim Woo-jin	"Lies" by g.o.d
Stage 2. J(Jackpot)
Day6's Dowoon	Drum Solo
Day6's Dowoon Twice's Chaeyoung Day6's Jae Park Stray Kids' Han Day6's Young K Stray Kids' Changbin GOT7's Bambam	Rap Performance
Stage 3. Y(Youth)
Twice's Momo Hirai	Dance Solo
GOT7's Yugyeom	Dance Solo
Stage 4. P(Precision)
Twice (Jeongyeon, Sana, Mina, Dahyun, Tzuyu) Stray Kids (Lee Know, Hyunjin, Felix, Seungmin, IN)	Dance Performance
GOT7 Day6 Twice Stray Kids	"Don't Leave Me" by Park Jin-young
10cm	"Mattress"
Highlight's Yong Jun Hyung	"Go Away"
Highlight's Yong Jun Hyung 10 cm	"Sudden Shower"
Lovelyz	"That Day" "Lost N Found"
AOA	"Bingle Bangle"
VIXX	"Scentist"
Red Velvet	"Hit That Drum" "Power Up"
Wanna One	"I.P.U" "12th Star"
Apink	"I'm So Sick"
GOT7	"Miracle" "Lullaby"
Twice	"Yes Or Yes" "Dance the Night Away"
BTS Special
J-Hope	"Just Dance"
Jungkook	"Euphoria"
Jimin	"Serendipity"
RM	"Love"
V	"Singularity"
Suga	"Seesaw"
Jin	"Epiphany"
BTS	"Fake Love"
EXO Special
EXO	"Sign"
Sehun	Dance Solo
EXO	"Tempo" "Love Shot"
Kim Yeon Ja All Performers	"Amor Fati"
