= List of awards and nominations received by Sechs Kies =

This is a list of awards received by Sechs Kies, a South Korean boy band who debuted under Daesung Entertainment in 1997. They are currently signed under YG Entertainment.

== Awards ==
Year	Awards
1997	12th Korea Visual and Records Grand Prize Award (Golden Disc Awards), Bonsang; Seoul Music Awards, Bonsang; KMTV Korean Music Awards, New Artist; KBS Music Awards, Bonsang; MBC Music Festival, Best 10 Artist Award; SBS Music Awards, Best 10 Artist Award
1998	13th Korea Visual and Records Grand Prize Award (Golden Disc Awards), Bonsang; 9th Seoul Music Awards, Daesang (Shared With H.O.T.); 9th Seoul Music Awards, Bonsang; KMTV Korean Music Awards, Popularity Award; KBS Music Awards, Artist Of The Year (Teen Category); MBC Music Festival, Popularity Award (Voted By Under 30); SBS Music Awards, Best 10 Artist Award
1999	14th Korea Visual and Records Grand Prize Award (Golden Disc Awards), Bonsang; 10th Seoul Music Awards, Bonsang; KMTV Korean Music Awards, Bonsang; KBS Music Awards, Bonsang; MBC Music Festival, Best 10 Artist Award; SBS Music Awards, Best 10 Artist Award
2016	8th Melon Music Awards, Hall of Fame; 31st Golden Disc Awards, Best Male Group Performance; 26th Seoul Music Awards, Bonsang; 6th Gaon Chart Music Awards, The Kpop Contribution of The Year; Star Wars Awards, Hall of Fame
2017	2017 BOF Awards, The Legend Star; 2017 BOF Awards, Best Fandom (YellowKies); 7th Gaon Chart Music Awards, Song of the Year - September
2018	2018 KBS Entertainment Awards, Popularity Award (Ko Jiyong, Ko Seungjae)
