= Music Bank =

South Korean television program

- Logo used since 2019
- Genre: Music
- Presented by: Bang Jee-min; Kim Jae-won
- Country of origin: South Korea
- Original language: Korean
- No. of seasons: 17
- No. of episodes: 1,302

Production
- Running time: 90 minutes
- Production company: KBS Entertainment Production Department

Original release
- Network: KBS2
- Release: June 16, 1998 – present

Music Bank (Korean: 뮤직뱅크) is a South Korean music program which airs every Friday at 17:15 KST on KBS2. As of 2015, the show is also broadcast in more than a hundred countries through KBS World. Episodes are filmed at the KBS New Wing Open Hall in Yeouido-dong, Yeongdeungpo District. The show also organizes the global live concert Music Bank World Tour.

== History ==
Before Music Bank, Top 10 Songs (가요톱10) debuted in 1981 airing live at 6:30 (KST) on Fridays and airing until 1998. For the first few months of 1998, Bravo New Generation took its place, but due to low ratings, it was quickly replaced by Music Bank on June 18, 1998. The chart format that was used since Top 10 Songs was abandoned in late 2001 due to controversy and was changed into a request format.

In 2005, the show was moved to Sunday afternoons at 12:45 (KST) and became a recorded broadcast. Due to sinking ratings, in September 2007, the show returned to its original time slot of Friday evenings at 6:30 (KST) and returned to a live format. The charts were revived as category-based charts.

In January 2008, the category-based charts were combined into the K-Chart which is the familiar countdown chart and the only program to do so. In June 2008, the show extended to 70 minutes, airing from 6:30 (KST) to 7:40 (KST) making it the longest music program on air. In November 2008, as part of the Autumn format changes, the show began airing from 6:40 (KST) to 8:00 (KST) for 80 minutes. In May 2010, as part of the Spring format changes, the show began airing from 5:50 (KST) to 7:10 (KST) for 80 minutes.

On August 27, 2010, Music Bank began airing live to 54 countries around the world through KBS World, and included new interactive features for international viewers through Twitter. On November 11, 2011, as part of the autumn format changes, the show began airing for 105 minutes from 6:10 (KST) to 7:55 (KST), following KBS News 6. In August 2012, Asian American cable network Myx TV began airing the first English dubbed version of Music Bank. Since October 25, 2013, the show began airing for 80 minutes from 6:30 (KST) to 7:50 (KST), following KBS Global 24, which was transferred from KBS1 with effect from October 21, 2013.

Since February 27, 2026, it has been hosted by Bang Jee-min and Kim Jae-won. Past hosts include Song Hye-kyo, Rain, Ji Sung, Song Joong-ki, Park Seo-joon, Yoon Bora, Irene, Park Bo-gum, Choi Bo-min, Shin Ye-eun, Choi Soo-bin, Arin, Park Sung-hoon, Jang Won-young, Lee Chae-min, Hong Eun-chae, Park Min-ju and Moon Sang-min among others.

== K-Chart ==
K-Chart is the countdown chart of Music Bank. The charts are calculated by combining the Digital Music Charts (60%), Album Sales (5%), Number of times broadcast on KBS (20%), K-POP Fan Voting Charts (Mubeat App) (10%), and social media charts (5%). This chart tracks from Monday to Sunday, and the Top 50 songs of the week are featured on the show, where the Top 50–21 songs are shown via marquee and the Top 20–3 songs are featured by the hosts. The hosts showcase the Top Two songs in the beginning of the show and announce who will be the winner of the week. The Number 1 song on the chart is the winner of that week's chart and receives an award.

During the last week of June, the most popular song of the first half of the year is awarded the Music Bank First Half 1st Place award. During the last week of December, the Music Bank 1st Place award (or Music Bank MVP in 2008) is awarded to the most popular song of the entire year.

Before the combined K-Charts, category-based charts were used. From September to December 2007, every week a different category (Digital Music Charts, Karaoke Charts, Viewers Choice Charts, Album Sales Charts) was featured. Technically, each category would only be featured once a month. It was similar to K-Chart except the results each week could only be based on a specific chart, and not all the charts combined. From January 2008 to April 2009, two charts were used. Every week, the Digital Music Charts and Album Sales Charts were used, and at the end of the month were the combined charts (Album Sales Charts (20%) + Digital Music Charts (50%) + Viewers Choice Charts (30%)). In May 2009, this was abandoned for the combined charts featured every week. Note that the Music Bank ranking system is different from other previous and current televised K-Pop music shows, in that an artist can win an unlimited number of times for the same song (other shows generally remove it from the charts after three wins, for Music Core it's after five wins or two months since release). While other music chart shows have a full score of 10,000 or 11,000, Music Bank's full score is 200,000, meaning Digital Music Charts category has 120,000 score as full score, 40,000 for Broadcast, 20,000 for K-POP Fan Voting Charts (Mubeat App) 10,000 for Album Sales, and finally 10,000 from Social Media. The new criteria for Music Bank took effect in the January 6, 2023 episode, where the Digital Music Chart percentage decreased from 65% to 60%, the Album Sales are will now be acquired from Gaon instead of the previous Hanteo chart, the KBS Broadcast Plays now added its digital channel in the aggregation scoring alongside its TV and radio channels, and the Social Media Charts will be sourced from the YouTube and TikTok data gathered from the Gaon charts.

=== Winners ===
- 2008
- 2009
- 2010
- 2011
- 2012
- 2013
- 2014
- 2015
- 2016
- 2017
- 2018
- 2019
- 2020
- 2021
- 2022
- 2023
- 2024
- 2025
- 2026

== Hosts ==
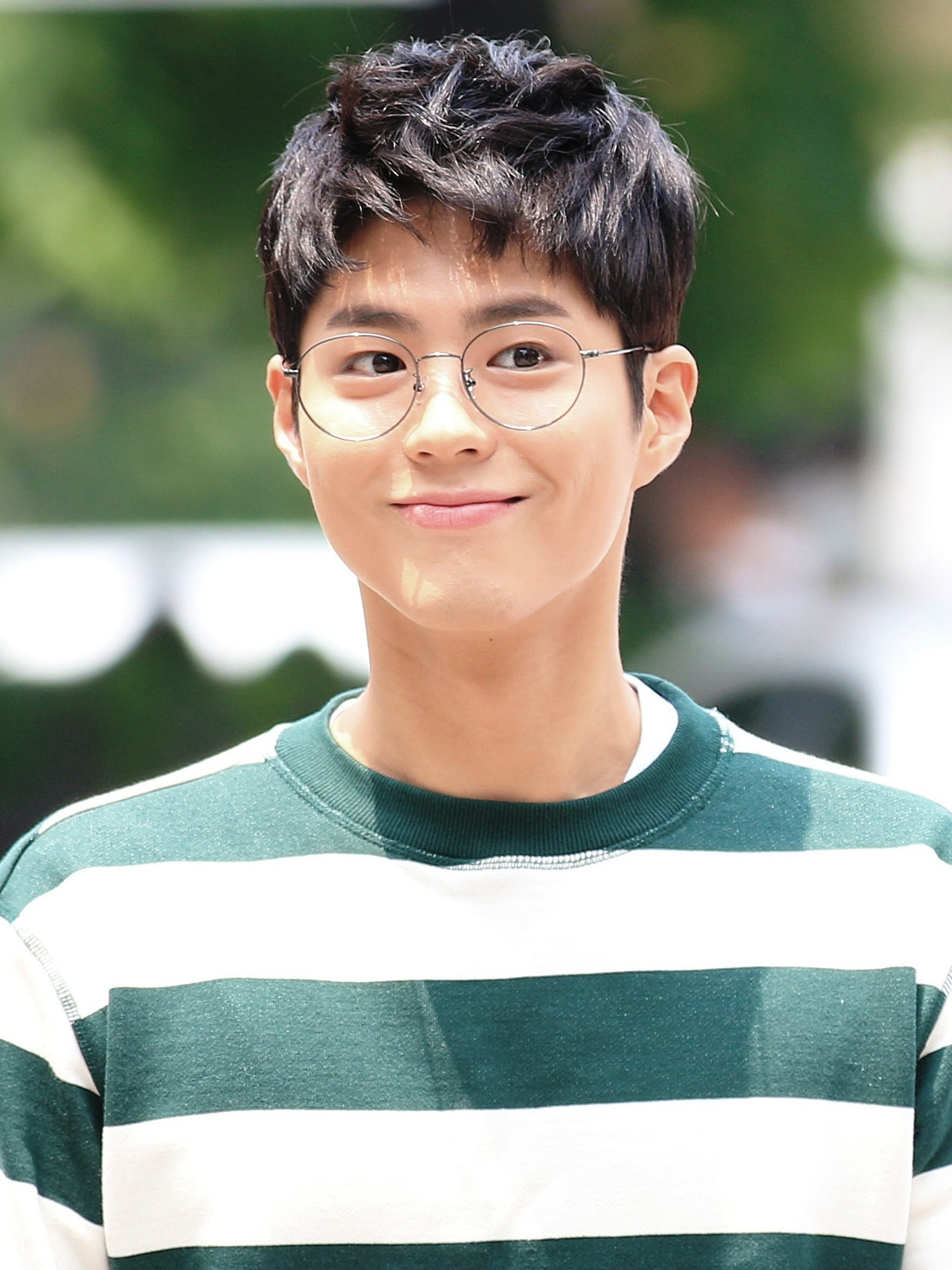
Former host Park Bo-gum on his way to film Music Bank in June 2016

Date	Hosts
1998	Ryu Si-won, Kim Ji-ho
1999	Ryu Si-won, Hwang Yu-sun
1999	Kim Seung-hyun, Hwang Yu-sun
1999	Joo Young-hoon, Hwang Yu-sun
2000	Joo Young-hoon, Kim Gyu-ri
2000	Lee Hwi-jae, Song Hye-kyo
2000	Lee Hwi-jae, Lee Na-young
2001	Lee Hwi-jae, Kim Bo-kyung
November 8, 2001 – April 18, 2002	Lee Hwi-jae, Kim Gyu-ri
April 25 – October 24, 2002	Lee Hwi-jae, Kim Min-jung
October 31, 2002 – January 30, 2003	Rain, Shoo
February 6 – June 19, 2003	Jun Jin, Shoo
June 26, 2003 – June 11, 2004	Choi Jung-won, Park Jung-ah
June 18 – November 5, 2004	Ji Sung, Park Eun-hye
November 12, 2004 – April 29, 2005	Namkoong Min, So Yi-hyun
May 8 – October 30, 2005	Ji Hyun-woo, Kim Bo-min
November 6, 2005 – March 12, 2006	Kang Kyung-joon, Park Kyung-lim
March 26 – November 19, 2006	Kang Kyung-joon, Jang Hee-jin
November 26, 2006 – April 1, 2007	Haha, Lee So-yeon
April 8, 2007 – February 1, 2008	Haha, Lee Hyun-ji
February 15 – May 16, 2008	Tablo, Kim Sung-eun
May 23 – August 8, 2008	Tablo, Min Seo-hyun
August 29, 2008 – January 9, 2009	Yoo Se-yoon, Seo In-young
January 16 – July 31, 2009	Yoo Se-yoon, Park Eun-young
August 7, 2009 – November 19, 2010	Song Joong-ki, Seo Hyo-rim
December 3, 2010 – October 21, 2011	Hyun Woo, Kim Min-ji
October 28, 2011 – November 11, 2011	Hyun Woo, Uee
November 18, 2011	Tim, Sohee, Sunye
November 25, 2011	Shindong, Sohee, Sunye
December 2, 2011	Minho, Sohee, Yubin
December 9, 2011	Minho, Sohee, Sunye
December 16, 2011	Shindong, Sohee, Yubin
December 23, 2011	Jung Yong-hwa, Choi Siwon, Yoon Doo-joon, Jun Hyun-moo
January 6, 2012 – March 29, 2013	Lee Jang-woo, Uee
April 5, 2013	Lee Jang-woo, Kang Min-kyung
April 12, 2013 – October 4, 2013	Jeong Jinwoon, Park Se-young
September 6, 2013	Jo Kwon, Park Se-young
October 11, 2013	Seulong, Park Se-young
October 18, 2013	Jo Kwon
October 25, 2013 – April 24, 2015	Park Seo-joon, Yoon Bora
May 1, 2015 – June 24, 2016	Park Bo-gum, Irene
December 4, 2015	Park Bo-gum, V, Him-chan
July 1, 2016 – November 4, 2016	Kang Min-hyuk, Solbin
July 15, 2016	Kang Min-hyuk, Solbin, Son Dong-woon
November 11, 2016 – May 11, 2018	Lee Seo-won, Solbin
May 18, 2018	Solbin, N
May 25, 2018	Solbin, Son Dong-woon
June 1, 2018	Solbin, Taemin
June 8, 2018	Solbin, Jin
June 15, 2018 – June 28, 2019	Kei, Choi Won-myeong
July 5, 2019 – July 17, 2020	Shin Ye-eun, Choi Bo-min
July 24, 2020 – October 1, 2021	Arin, Choi Soo-bin
October 8, 2021 – September 2, 2022	Jang Won-young, Park Sung-hoon
November 19, 2021	Jang Won-young, Park Sung-hoon and Huening Kai
February 4, 2022	Jang Won-young and Yang Jung-won
August 5, 2022	Park Ji-hu and Park Sung-hoon
September 16, 2022	Jang Won-young and Lee Ju-yeon
September 23, 2022	Jang Won-young and Lee Young-ji
September 30, 2022 – January 13, 2023	Jang Won-young and Lee Chae-min
October 14, 2022	Kang Seul-gi and Lee Chae-min
December 2, 2022	Shin Yu-na and Lee Chae-min
January 6, 2023	Haewon and Lee Chae-min
January 20, 2023 – January 27, 2023	Minji and Lee Chae-min
February 3, 2023	Mimi and Lee Chae-min
February 10, 2023 – May 3, 2024	Hong Eun-chae and Lee Chae-min
March 24, 2023	Dahyun and Lee Chae-min
August 25, 2023	Hanni and Lee Chae-min
September 1, 2023	Arin and Lee Chae-min
September 8, 2023	Kim Se-jeong and Lee Chae-min
October 27, 2023	Choi Soo-bin and Lee Chae-min
November 3, 2023	Umji and Lee Chae-min
January 5, 2024	Kwon Eun-bi and Lee Chae-min
January 19, 2024	Hyein and Lee Chae-min
February 2, 2024	Huh Yunjin and Lee Chae-min
April 5, 2024	Noh Yun-ah and Lee Chae-min
April 12, 2024	Park Min-ju and Lee Chae-min
May 10, 2024	Hong Eun-chae and Lee Hyun-jae
May 17, 2024	Hong Eun-chae and Kim Tae-rae
May 24, 2024	Hong Eun-chae, Zhang Hao and Jo
May 31, 2024 – September 27, 2024	Hong Eun-chae and Moon Sang-min
June 28, 2024	Hong Eun-chae, Shinyu and Choi Young-jae
September 6, 2024	Hong Eun-chae, Kim Tae-rae and Zhang Hao
October 4, 2024 – January 30, 2026	Park Min-ju and Moon Sang-min
November 22, 2024	Jaemin, Yunho and Moon Sang-min
March 7, 2025	Haewon and Moon Sang-min
April 4, 2025	Park Min-ju, Hyunjun and Junpyo
May 16, 2025	Park Min-ju and Shinyu
June 13, 2025	Park Min-ju and Shin Yu-na
July 11, 2025	Park Min-ju and Lee Won-hee
August 8, 2025	Park Min-ju, Choi Soo-bin and Huening Kai
August 22, 2025	Park Min-ju, Sui and Kya
August 28, 2025	Park Min-ju and Rei
September 5, 2025	Karina and Moon Sang-min
September 12, 2025	Kim Ji-woong and Moon Sang-min
October 24, 2025	Park Min-ju and Lee Chan-won
February 6, 2026	Leo and Kim Jun-seo
February 13, 2026	Sui and Kya
February 27, 2026 - Present	Bang Jee-min and Kim Jae-won

== Achievements by artists ==
List of most No. 1 winners

Most No. 1 winners
Rank	Artist	Count
1st	BTS	51
2nd	Girls' Generation	42
3rd	Exo	37
4th	Twice	30
5th	IU	27
6th	Big Bang	22
7th	Seventeen	21
8th	Super Junior	20
9th	Psy	18
9th	Shinee	18
9th	Beast/Highlight	18

List of longest consecutive No. 1 songs

Longest consecutive No. 1 songs
Rank	Artist	Song	Count	Year
1st	Psy	"Gangnam Style"	10	2012
2nd	Girls' Generation	"Gee"	9	2009
3rd	Girls' Generation	"The Boys"	6	2011
3rd	IU	"You & I"	6	2011–2012
3rd	BTS	"Dynamite"	6	2020
6th	G-Dragon	"Heartbreaker"	5	2009
6th	2NE1	"I Don't Care"	5	2009
6th	Girls' Generation	"Oh!"	5	2010
6th	Girls' Generation	"Hoot"	5	2010
6th	Super Junior	"Mr. Simple"	5	2011
6th	Twice	"TT"	5	2016

List of most awarded songs

Songs with most awards
Rank	Artist	Song	Count	Year
1st	Psy	"Gangnam Style"	17	2012–2013
2nd	BTS	"Dynamite"	16	2020–2021
3rd	Girls' Generation	"Gee"	11	2009
4th	Girls' Generation	"Oh!"	7	2010
4th	BTS	"Boy with Luv"	7	2019
6th	Girls' Generation	"The Boys"	6	2011
6th	IU	"You & I"	6	2011–2012
6th	Twice	"TT"	6	2016–2017
9th	Super Junior	"Sorry, Sorry"	5	2009
9th	2NE1	"I Don't Care"	5	2009
9th	G-Dragon	"Heartbreaker"	5	2009
9th	Girls' Generation	"Hoot"	5	2010
9th	Super Junior	"Mr. Simple"	5	2011
9th	Soyou & Junggigo	"Some"	5	2014
9th	Twice	"Cheer Up"	5	2016

List of top 10 highest scores (20th system)

Top 10 highest scores (20th system) February 25, 2022 – December 30, 2022

Scoring system: digital music charts (60%), number of times broadcast on KBS (20%), viewers choice charts (10%), album sales (5%) and social media charts (5%)

Rank	Artist	Song	Score	Date
1st	Seventeen	"Hot"	13,816	2022/06/04
2nd	TXT	"Good Boy Gone Bad"	12,610	2022/05/20
3rd	(G)I-dle	"Nxde"	12,541	2022/10/28
4th	Ive	"After Like"	12,174	2022/09/02
5th	Ive	"Love Dive"	12,095	2022/04/15
6th	Ive	"After Like"	11,406	2022/09/09
7th	Stray Kids	"Case 143"	11,168	2022/10/14
8th	NewJeans	"Attention"	11,150	2022/08/19
9th	The Boyz	"Whisper"	11,097	2022/08/26
10th	NCT Dream	"Beatbox"	11,069	2022/06/10

List of top 10 highest scores (current system)

Top 10 highest scores (current system) January 6, 2023 – present

Scoring system: digital music charts (60%), number of times broadcast on KBS (20%), K-pop fan vote (10%), album sales (5%) and social media charts (5%)

Rank	Artist	Song	Score	Date
1st	Seventeen	"God of Music"	16,281	2023/11/03
2nd	Enhypen	"Bad Desire (With or Without You)"	15,416	2025/06/13
3rd	Ive	"I Am"	14,690	2023/04/21
4th	NCT Wish	"Poppop"	14,627	2025/04/25
5th	Ateez	"Adrenaline"	14,413	2026/02/13
6th	Stray Kids	"Ceremony"	14,067	2025/08/29
7th	Le Sserafim	"Unforgiven"	13,498	2023/05/12
8th	Stray Kids	"S-Class"	13,481	2023/06/09
9th	TXT	"Sugar Rush Ride"	13,245	2023/02/03
10th	Zerobaseone	"Feel the Pop"	13,101	2024/05/24

List of top 10 highest scores (January 2013 - present)

Top 10 highest scores (all time) January 2013 – present

Rank	Artist	Song	Score	Date
1st	Sistar19	"Gone Not Around Any Longer"	19,651	2013/02/15
2nd	Girls' Generation	"I Got a Boy"	18,778	2013/01/18
3rd	f(x)	"Rum Pum Pum Pum"	16,888	2013/08/09
4th	Infinite	"Man In Love"	16,387	2013/04/05
5th	Sistar	"Give It To Me"	16,347	2013/06/28
6th	Cho Yong-pil	"Bounce"	16,309	2013/05/03
7th	Seventeen	"God of Music"	16,281	2023/11/03
8th	Ailee	"U&I"	16,069	2013/07/26
9th	Girl's Generation	"I Got A Boy"	15,955	2013/01/11
10th	Psy	"Gentleman"	15,768	2013/04/26

== Tours ==
Since July 2011, the Music Bank World Tour has been held in multiple cities across Asia, Europe and Latin America with an estimated global live audience of 200,000.

== Awards and nominations ==
Name of the award ceremony, year presented, category, nominee of the award, and the result of the nomination
Award ceremony	Year	Category	Nominee	Result	Ref.
KBS Entertainment Awards	2016	Best Newcomer	Park Bo-gum	Won	

== See also ==
- KBS Song Festival
- Music programs of South Korea
- Kpop
