= List of Music Bank Chart winners (2014) =

Winners of South Korean music program Music Bank

Music Bank Chart winners (2014)

Highlights
- Song with most wins: "Some" by Soyou & Junggigo (5)
- Artist(s) with most wins: Soyou & Junggigo (5)
- Song with highest score: "Some" by Soyou & Junggigo (11,011)

The Music Bank Chart is a record chart on the South Korean KBS television music program Music Bank. Every week, the show awards the best-performing single on the chart in the country during its live broadcast.

In 2014, 32 singles achieved a number one on the chart and 28 music acts were awarded first-place trophies. Of all releases for the year Soyou & Junggigo's "Some" acquired the highest point total on the February 21 broadcast with a score of 11,011.

== Chart history ==
Key
	Highest score in 2014
—	No show was held

Episode	Date	Artist	Song	Points	Ref.
728	January 3	IU	"Friday"	4,927	
729	January 10	Rain	"La Song"	4,722	
730	January 17	TVXQ	"Something"	9,749	
731	January 24	B1A4	"Lonely"	8,408	
—	January 31	B1A4	"Lonely"	5,373	
732	February 7	TVXQ	"Something"	4,839	
733	February 14	B.A.P	"1004 (Angel)"	6,748	
734	February 21	Soyou & Junggigo	"Some"	11,011	
735	February 28	Soyou & Junggigo	"Some"	9,202	
736	March 7	Soyou & Junggigo	"Some"	7,451	
737	March 14	Girls' Generation	"Mr.Mr."	9,418	
738	March 21	Soyou & Junggigo	"Some"	6,142	
739	March 28	CNBLUE	"Can't Stop"	6,119	
740	April 4	Soyou & Junggigo	"Some"	4,757	
741	April 11	Apink	"Mr. Chu"	6,332	
—	April 18	No chart and winner			
—	April 25	No chart and winner			
—	May 2	No chart and winner			
—	May 9	No chart and winner			
—	May 16	No chart and winner			
—	May 23	No chart and winner			
—	May 30	Infinite	"Last Romeo"	6,899	
—	June 6	Fly to the Sky	"You You You"	6,002	
742	June 13	Infinite	"Last Romeo"	6,286	
743	June 20	Taeyang	"Eyes, Nose, Lips"	6,674	
744	June 27	Beast	"Good Luck"	9,699	
745	July 4	Beast	"Good Luck"	7,338	
746	July 11	Beast	"Good Luck"	6,499	
747	July 18	f(x)	"Red Light"	6,542	
748	July 25	B1A4	"Solo Day"	6,883	
749	August 1	Sistar	"Touch My Body"	9,397	
750	August 8	Sistar	"Touch My Body"	8,213	
751	August 15	Sistar	"Touch My Body"	5,930	
752	August 22	Winner	"Empty"	6,224	
753	August 29	Taemin	"Danger"	6,180	
—	September 5	Sistar	"I Swear"	4,880	
754	September 12	Super Junior	"Mamacita"	6,318	
—	September 19	Super Junior	"Mamacita"	7,232	
755	September 26	Teen Top	"Missing"	6,751	
756	October 3	Girls' Generation-TTS	"Holler"	6,430	
757	October 10	Ailee	"Don't Touch Me"	6,601	
758	October 17	Kim Dong-ryul	"How I Am"	6,863	
759	October 24	VIXX	"Error"	5,939	
760	October 31	Beast	"12:30"	8,229	
761	November 7	Beast	"12:30"	7,261	
762	November 14	Beast	"12:30"	3,875	
763	November 21	Kyuhyun	"At Gwanghwamun"	5,359	
764	November 28	Toy	"Three of Us"	6,778	
765	December 5	Apink	"Luv"	8,599	
766	December 12	Apink	"Luv"	8,021	
767	December 19	Apink	"Luv"	6,006	
—	December 26	Apink	"Luv"	4,960	
