= List of Music Bank Chart winners (2009) =

Winners of South Korean music program Music Bank

Music Bank Chart winners (2009)

The Music Bank Chart is a record chart on the South Korean KBS television music program Music Bank. Every week, the show awards the best-performing single on the chart in the country during its live broadcast.

In 2009, 18 singles achieved a number one on the chart and 13 music acts were awarded first-place trophies.

== Chart history ==
Key
—	No show was held

Episode	Date	Artist	Song	Ref.
492	January 2	Baek Ji-young	"Like Being Hit by a Bullet"	
493	January 9	Baek Ji-young	"Like Being Hit by a Bullet"	
494	January 16	Girls' Generation	"Gee"	
495	January 23	Girls' Generation	"Gee"	
496	January 30	Girls' Generation	"Gee"	
497	February 6	Girls' Generation	"Gee"	
498	February 13	Girls' Generation	"Gee"	
499	February 20	Girls' Generation	"Gee"	
500	February 27	Girls' Generation	"Gee"	
501	March 6	Girls' Generation	"Gee"	
502	March 13	Girls' Generation	"Gee"	
503	March 20	Davichi	"8282"	
504	March 27	Super Junior	"Sorry, Sorry"	
505	April 3	Davichi	"8282"	
506	April 10	Son Dam-bi	"Saturday Night"	
507	April 17	Son Dam-bi	"Saturday Night"	
508	April 24	Super Junior	"Sorry, Sorry"	
509	May 1	Super Junior	"Sorry, Sorry"	
510	May 8	Super Junior	"Sorry, Sorry"	
511	May 15	Super Junior	"Sorry, Sorry"	
512	May 22	Super Junior	"It's You"	
—	May 29	Davichi (with Ji-yeon & SeeYa)	"Women's Generation"	
513	June 5	Shinee	"Juliette"	
514	June 12	2PM	"Again & Again"	
515	June 19	Shinee	"Juliette"	
516	June 26	Girls' Generation	"Gee"	
517	July 3	2PM	"I Hate You"	
518	July 10	Girls' Generation	"Genie"	
519	July 17	2NE1	"I Don't Care"	
520	July 24	2NE1	"I Don't Care"	
521	July 31	2NE1	"I Don't Care"	
522	August 7	2NE1	"I Don't Care"	
523	August 14	2NE1	"I Don't Care"	
—	August 21	Brown Eyed Girls	"Abracadabra"	
524	August 28	G-Dragon	"Heartbreaker"	
525	September 4	G-Dragon	"Heartbreaker"	
526	September 11	G-Dragon	"Heartbreaker"	
527	September 18	G-Dragon	"Heartbreaker"	
528	September 25	G-Dragon	"Heartbreaker"	
—	October 2	Kim Tae-woo	"Love Rain"	
529	October 9	Kim Tae-woo	"Love Rain"	
530	October 16	Kim Tae-woo	"Love Rain"	
—	October 23	Leessang	"Girl Unable To Break Up, Boy Unable To Leave"	
531	October 30	Shinee	"Ring Ding Dong"	
532	November 6	Shinee	"Ring Ding Dong"	
533	November 13	SS501	"Love Like This"	
534	November 20	SS501	"Love Like This"	
535	November 27	2PM	"Heartbeat"	
536	December 4	2PM	"Heartbeat"	
537	December 11	2PM	"Heartbeat"	
538	December 18	2PM	"Heartbeat"	
539	December 25	Girls' Generation	"Gee"	
