= 2020 KBS Song Festival =

South Korean annual music festival

- Also known as: 2020 KBS Gayo Daechukje
- KBS 2020 가요대축제
- Presented by: TVXQ's U-Know, Astro's Cha Eun-woo, Shin Ye-eun
- Starring: BTS; TWICE; NCT; Park Jin-young; Sunmi; Taemin; Paul Kim; Kim Yeon-ja; Sul Woon-do; Jessi; GOT7; Iz*One (G)I-dle; Oh My Girl; NU'EST; The Boyz; Mamamoo; Momoland; Monsta X Stray Kids; Enhypen; GFriend; Itzy; TXT

Production
- Production locations: KBS Hall; Seoul, South Korea
- Production company: Korean Broadcasting System

Original release
- Network: KBS 2TV; KBS World
- Release: December 18, 2020

The 2020 KBS Song Festival (Korean: KBS 2020 가요대축제) was the 10th edition of KBS Song Festival, held on December 18, 2020, broadcast by KBS at 8:30 pm KST on the 18th to 12:15 am on the 19th. A total of 20 teams have been invited to the show.

This year's theme was "Connect", referring to how artists and their fans will connect through music during this time when they can't meet in person because of the COVID-19 pandemic.

== Background ==
On November 12, KBS announced that KBS '2020 Song Festival' will be held on December 18, without audience due to the COVID-19 pandemic. The specific cast has not been announced.

On November 27, it was shared that TVXQ's Yunho, Astro's Cha Eun-woo and Shin Ye-eun will host the event.

On December 10, KBS released a video featuring idols dancing and singing a song that encourages everyone to tune in to the festival. The video features NCT's Lucas, NU'EST's JR and Minhyun, Oh My Girl's Arin, Twice's Sana and Dahyun, TXT's Soobin, Momoland's JooE, ITZY's Yeji, and GOT7's Jinyoung. Many fans have pointed out that the song they're singing sounds like a spin on Momoland's "Banana Chacha".

On December 15, it was revealed the first lineup of artists as: BTS, TWICE, Seventeen, NCT, Park Jin-young, Sunmi, Taemin, Paul Kim, Kim Yeon-ja, Sul Woon-do and Jessi. The following day, KBS released a teaser video containing the lineup of performers of the '2020 KBS Song Festival' through its official YouTube channel including GOT7, Iz*One, (G)I-dle and Oh My Girl. The third and final lineup was revealed: NU'EST, The Boyz, Mamamoo, Momoland, Monsta X, Aespa, Enhypen, GFriend, Itzy and TXT.

On December 17, a positive case of COVID-19 was confirmed by a person who visited a hair shop on the December 16. As a result, artists who visited the hair shop became concerned about the possible infection. KBS responded, "The 2020 KBS Song Festival will be held as scheduled [but] pre-recording scheduled for this day[December 17] is canceled." Two groups underwent COVID-19 testing: Seventeen because they visited the hair shop that had a confirmed case, and NCT because their makeup staff crossed paths with the confirmed hair shop case. The same day, KBS reported on My Daily, "pre-recording as usual".

On December 18, NCT members have tested negative. However, Pledis Entertainment announced that Seventeen will ultimately not attend the event. Pledis stated, "All members quickly performed the test at the same time, but the time when the results were delivered from the inspection office were all different. The members who received the negative results resumed their activities normally from today, but S.Coups' test results were notified from the prosecutor's office that it was difficult to confirm until today."

== Schedule ==
Sections	Date	Airtime
The Beginning and Photo Wall	December 18, 2020	19:00–20:30 KST
Main Event	December 18, 2020	20:30~ KST

== Presenters ==
- The Beginning
- Photo Wall - MC Ding Dong
- Back Stage - Oh My Girl's Arin and TXT's Choi Soo-bin,
- Main Event - TVXQ's U-Know, Astro's Cha Eun-woo and Shin Ye-eun

== Performers ==
The following individuals and groups, listed in order of appearance or performed musical numbers.

Artist(s)	Song(s)
Twice	"Signal"
Enhypen	"Given-Taken"
Aespa	"Black Mamba"
Itzy	"Wannabe"
TXT	"Hug" by TVXQ "Blue Hour" (Dance Break Version)
Momoland	"Ready or Not"
Special Rap Stage
NCT's Taeyong and Mark	"Dragon"
Stray Kids' Bang Chan and Changbin	"Mischief"
Monsta X's I.M and Joohoney	"No Competition"
The Boyz	"The Stealer"
Iz*One	"Fiesta" "Panorama"
Jessi X Got7's Jackson Wang	"Nunu Nana"
Sul Woon-do X The Boyz	"Love Twist"
Kim Yeon-ja X Mamamoo's Solar	"Bling Bling"
(G)I-dle	"Oh My God"
Stray Kids	"Dionysus" by BTS "God's Menu"
Special Maknaes Stage
Oh My Girl's Arin (G)I-dle's Shuhua Iz*One's Wonyoung Itzy's Yuna	"I Don't Know" by Apink
Astro – Moonbin & Sanha	"Bad Idea"
Astro	"Knock"
GFriend	"Apple"
Paul Kim	"Every Day, Every Moment"
Special Sisters Stage
Iz*One's Lee Chae-yeon	"Criminal" by Taemin
Itzy's Lee Chaeryeong	"Roller Coaster" by Chungha
Iz*One's Lee Chae-yeon Itzy's Lee Chaeryeong	"Rain on Me by Lady Gaga and Ariana Grande
Oh My Girl	"Dolphin" "Nonstop"
NU'EST	JR Performance "I'm In Trouble"
NCT U	"Class" "Misfit"
NCT 127	"Kick It"
NCT 2020	"Resonance"
Special Retro King & Queen Stage
Park Jin-young Sunmi	"Nobody" "Pporappippam" "She Was Pretty" "Honey" "When We Disco"
Monsta X	"Stand Together" "Love Killa"
Hwasa	"María"
Mamamoo	"Aya"
Got7	"Out" "Last Piece"
Special 2B2U Stage
2B2U: GFriend's SinB; Oh My Girl's YooA; Iz*One's Eunbi; Itzy's Ryujin	"Boss" by NCT U
Special 9800 Stage
9800: Astro's Moonbin; NCT Shotaro; The Boyz's Juyeon; Stray Kids' Hyunjin	"Hard Carry" by Got7
Twice	"More & More" "I Can't Stop Me"
Taemin	"Criminal" "Idea"
BTS	"I Need U" "Dynamite" "Life Goes On"
All performers	"Romance of 2020"
