= List of Music Bank Chart winners (2012) =

Winners of South Korean music program Music Bank

Music Bank Chart winners (2012)

Highlights
- Song with most wins: "Gangnam Style" by Psy
- Artist(s) with most wins: Psy (16)
- Song with highest score: "Gangnam Style" by Psy (30,454)

The Music Bank Chart is a record chart on the South Korean KBS television music program Music Bank. Every week, the show awards the best-performing single on the chart in the country during its live broadcast.

In 2012, 24 singles achieved a number one on the chart and 23 music acts were awarded first-place trophies.

== Chart history ==
Key
—	No show was held

Episode	Date	Artist	Song	Ref.
635	January 6	IU	"You & I"	
636	January 13	IU	"You & I"	
637	January 20	T-ara	"Lovey-Dovey"	
638	January 27	T-ara	"Lovey-Dovey"	
639	February 3	Teen Top	"Going Crazy"	
640	February 10	T-ara	"Lovey-Dovey"	
641	February 17	T-ara	"Lovey-Dovey"	
642	February 24	Jay Park	"Know Your Name"	
643	March 2	K.Will	"I Need You"	
644	March 9	Big Bang	"Blue"	
645	March 16	Big Bang	"Blue"	
646	March 23	2AM	"I Wonder If You Hurt Like Me"	
647	March 30	2AM	"I Wonder If You Hurt Like Me"	
—	April 6	Shinee	"Sherlock (Clue + Note)"	
648	April 13	Shinee	"Sherlock (Clue + Note)"	
649	April 20	CNBLUE	"Hey You"	
650	April 27	Sistar	"Alone"	
651	May 4	Sistar	"Alone"	
652	May 11	Girls' Generation-TTS	"Twinkle"	
653	May 18	Girls' Generation-TTS	"Twinkle"	
654	May 25	Girls' Generation-TTS	"Twinkle"	
655	June 1	Infinite	"The Chaser"	
656	June 8	G.NA	"2HOT"	
657	June 15	Wonder Girls	"Like This"	
658	June 22	f(x)	"Electric Shock"	
659	June 29	f(x)	"Electric Shock"	
—	July 6	Jo Kwon	"I'm Da One (feat. Zion.T)"	
660	July 13	Sistar	"Loving U"	
661	July 20	Super Junior	"Sexy, Free & Single"	
662	July 27	Super Junior	"Sexy, Free & Single"	
—	August 3	Sistar	"Loving U"	
663	August 10	Beast	"Beautiful Night"	
664	August 17	Psy	"Gangnam Style"	
665	August 24	Psy	"Gangnam Style"	
666	August 31	Psy	"Gangnam Style"	
667	September 7	Kara	"Pandora"	
668	September 14	Psy	"Gangnam Style"	
669	September 21	Psy	"Gangnam Style"	
670	September 28	Psy	"Gangnam Style"	
671	October 5	Psy	"Gangnam Style"	
672	October 12	Psy	"Gangnam Style"	
673	October 19	Psy	"Gangnam Style"	
674	October 26	Psy	"Gangnam Style"	
675	November 2	Psy	"Gangnam Style"	
676	November 9	Psy	"Gangnam Style"	
677	November 16	Psy	"Gangnam Style"	
678	November 23	Ailee	"I Will Show You"	
679	November 30	Psy	"Gangnam Style"	
680	December 7	Lee Seung-gi	"Return"	
—	December 14	Yang Yo-seob	"Caffeine"	
681	December 21	Psy	"Gangnam Style"	
681	December 21	Yang Yo-seob	"Caffeine"	
—	December 28	Psy	"Gangnam Style"	
