= List of Music Bank Chart winners (2013) =

Winners of South Korean music program Music Bank

Music Bank Chart winners (2013)

Highlights
- Song with most wins: "I Got A Boy" by Girls' Generation, "Gone Not Around Any Longer" by Sistar19, & "Give It To Me" by Sistar (3)
- Artist(s) with most wins: Exo (4)
- Song with highest score: "Gone Not Around Any Longer" by Sistar19 (19,651)

The Music Bank Chart is a record chart on the South Korean KBS television music program Music Bank. Every week, the show awards the best-performing single on the chart in the country during its live broadcast.

In 2013, 36 singles achieved a number one on the chart and 30 music acts were awarded first-place trophies. Of all releases for the year Sistar19's "Gone Not Around Any Longer" acquired the highest point total on the February 15 broadcast with a score of 19,651.

== Chart history ==
Key
	Highest score in 2013
—	No show was held

Episode	Date	Artist	Song	Points	Ref.
682	January 4	Psy	"Gangnam Style"	15,078	
683	January 11	Girls' Generation	"I Got a Boy"	15,955	
684	January 18	Girls' Generation	"I Got a Boy"	18,778	
685	January 25	Girls' Generation	"I Got a Boy"	11,684	
686	February 1	CNBLUE	"I'm Sorry"	12,933	
687	February 8	CNBLUE	"I'm Sorry"	14,521	
688	February 15	Sistar19	"Gone Not Around Any Longer"	19,651	
689	February 22	Sistar19	"Gone Not Around Any Longer"	14,205	
690	March 1	Sistar19	"Gone Not Around Any Longer"	12,981	
691	March 8	Shinee	"Dream Girl"	12,323	
692	March 15	Shinee	"Dream Girl"	13,421	
693	March 22	2AM	"One Spring Day"	13,869	
694	March 29	G.NA	"Oops!"	7,020	
695	April 5	Infinite	"Man In Love"	16,387	
696	April 12	Infinite	"Man In Love"	10,846	
697	April 19	K.Will	"Love Blossom"	13,217	
698	April 26	Psy	"Gentleman"	15,768	
699	May 3	Cho Yong-pil	"Bounce"	16,309	
—	May 10	Cho Yong-pil	"Bounce"	12,778	
700	May 17	700th Episode Special, no chart and winner			
701	May 24	2PM	"Comeback When You Hear This Song"	13,037	
702	May 31	Shinhwa	"This Love"	9,482	
703	June 7	Lee Hyori	"Bad Girls"	10,085	
704	June 14	Exo	"Wolf"	14,419	
—	June 21	Sistar	"Give It To Me"	14,040	
705	June 28	Sistar	"Give It To Me"	16,347	
706	July 5	Sistar	"Give It To Me"	15,542	
707	July 12	Dynamic Duo	"BAAAM"	14,499	
708	July 19	Apink	"No No No"	10,342	
709	July 26	Ailee	"U&I"	16,069	
710	August 2	Ailee	"U&I"	13,835	
711	August 9	f(x)	"Rum Pum Pum Pum"	16,888	
712	August 16	Exo	"Growl"	12,225	
713	August 23	Exo	"Growl"	8,129	
714	August 30	Crayon Pop	"Bar Bar Bar"	5,770	
715	September 6	Teen Top	"Rocking"	6,824	
—	September 13	Kara	"Damaged Lady"	6,350	
—	September 20	G-Dragon	"Who You?"	6,441	
716	September 27	G-Dragon	"Crooked"	6,493	
717	October 4	Busker Busker	"Love, at first"	8,077	
718	October 11	Busker Busker	"Love, at first"	7,098	
719	October 18	IU	"The Red Shoes"	7,565	
720	October 25	Shinee	"Everybody"	7,649	
—	November 1	K.Will	"You Don't Know Love"	6,324	
721	November 8	Trouble Maker	"Now"	6,273	
722	November 15	Trouble Maker	"Now"	4,768	
723	November 22	Miss A	"Hush"	5,722	
724	November 29	Lee Juck	"Lie Lie Lie"	4,544	
725	December 6	VIXX	"Voodoo Doll"	5,084	
726	December 13	Hyolyn	"One Way Love"	5,399	
727	December 20	Exo	"Miracles in December"	11,148	
—	December 27	No chart and winner			
