= List of Music Bank Chart winners (2017) =

Music Bank Chart winners (2017)

Highlights
- Songs with most wins: "Plz Don't Be Sad" by Highlight, "Signal" by Twice & "DNA" by BTS (3)
- Artist(s) with most wins: Twice (9)
- Song with highest score: "Spring Day" by BTS (13,250)

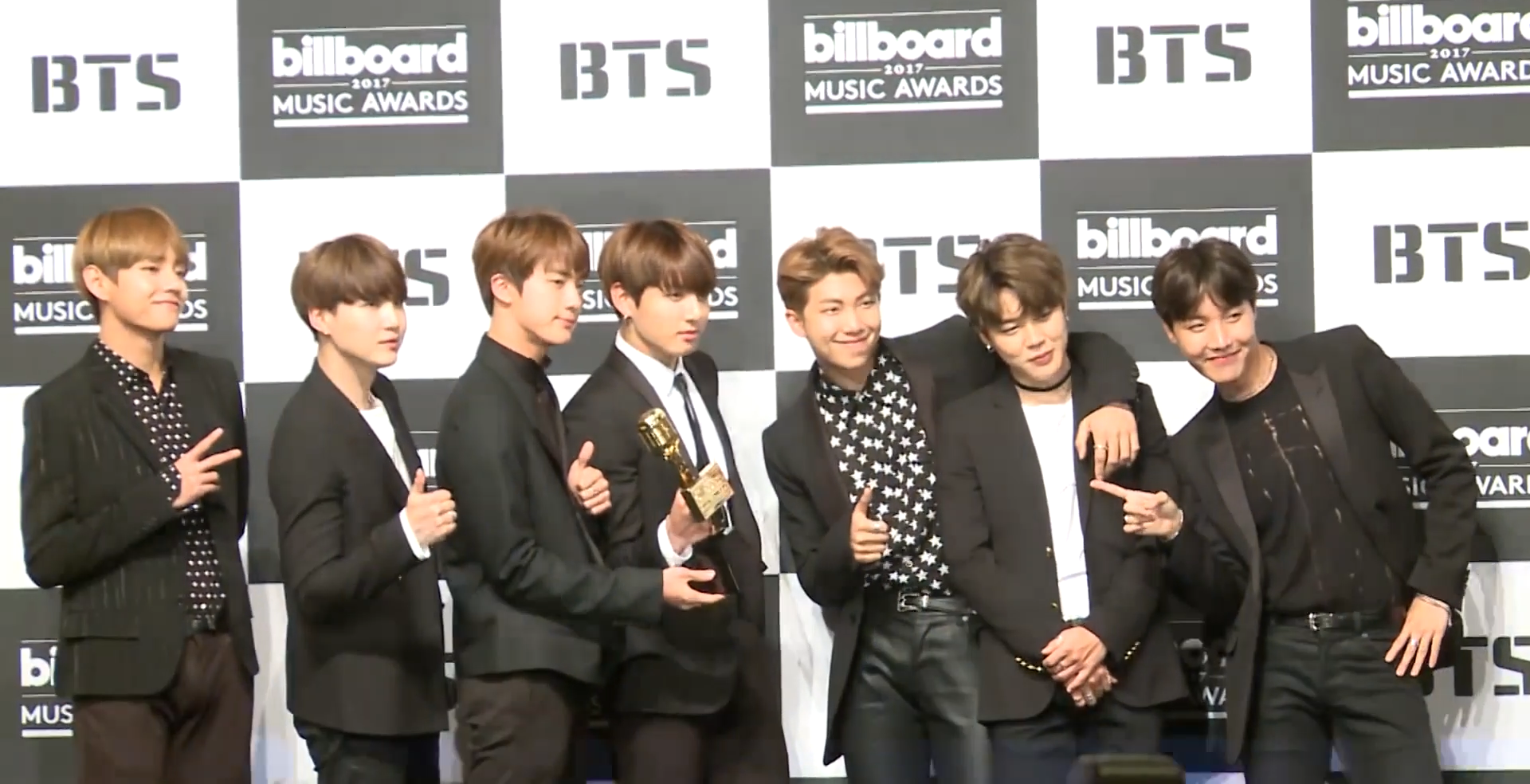
BTS's (pictured) "Spring Day" achieved the highest score in 2017, earning 13,250 points on the February 24 broadcast.

The Music Bank Chart is a record chart established in 1998 on the South Korean KBS television music program Music Bank. Every week during its live broadcast, the show gives an award for the best-performing single on the South Korean chart. The chart includes digital performance on domestic online music services (65%), album sales (5%), number of times the single was broadcast on KBS TV (20%), and viewers' choice (10%) in its ranking methodology. The score for domestic online music services is calculated using data from Melon, Bugs, Genie Music and Soribada. Laboum member Ahn Sol-bin and actor Lee Seo-won hosted the show in 2017. Ahn Sol-bin began hosting the show in July 2016 while Lee Seo-won began hosting in November 2016.

In 2017, 35 singles reached number one on the chart, and 26 acts were awarded first-place trophies. Out of all releases within the year, BTS's "Spring Day" acquired the highest point total with a score of 13,250, after the single debuted at number one on the February 24 broadcast. "Plz Don't Be Sad" earned boy group Highlight (formerly Beast) their first Music Bank award since leaving Cube Entertainment and re-debuting with Around Us Entertainment. Their single, along with "DNA" by BTS and "Signal" by girl group Twice, spent three weeks at number one on the chart, making those three the most-awarded songs of the year. Twice had five number one singles on the chart, the most of any act in 2017, including "TT", "Knock Knock", "Likey" and "Heart Shaker", along with "Signal". The five songs spent a total of nine weeks atop the chart, making Twice the act with the most wins of the year.

Nine acts gained their first number ones on the chart in 2017. Miss A member Suzy achieved her first solo music show award with her debut single "Pretend" in January. In April, girl group Laboum achieved their first music show award with "Hwi Hwi" from their second mini album. Two weeks later, Sechs Kies made their debut at number one with "Be Well". Hwang Chi-yeul achieved his first music show award with "A Daily Song" on the June 23 broadcast, over 10 years after his debut. Boy group Wanna One achieved their first number one on Music Bank with their debut single "Energetic", which was immediately followed into the top spot by another first time chart-topper, Yoon Jong-shin with his song "Like It". Yoon achieved his first number one over 27 years after his debut. NU'EST W, a subgroup of boy group NU'EST, achieved their first number one with their debut single "Where You At". The final artist to reach number one for the first time in 2017 was the hip hop trio Epik High who topped the chart for the first time in November with "Love Story".

== Chart history ==
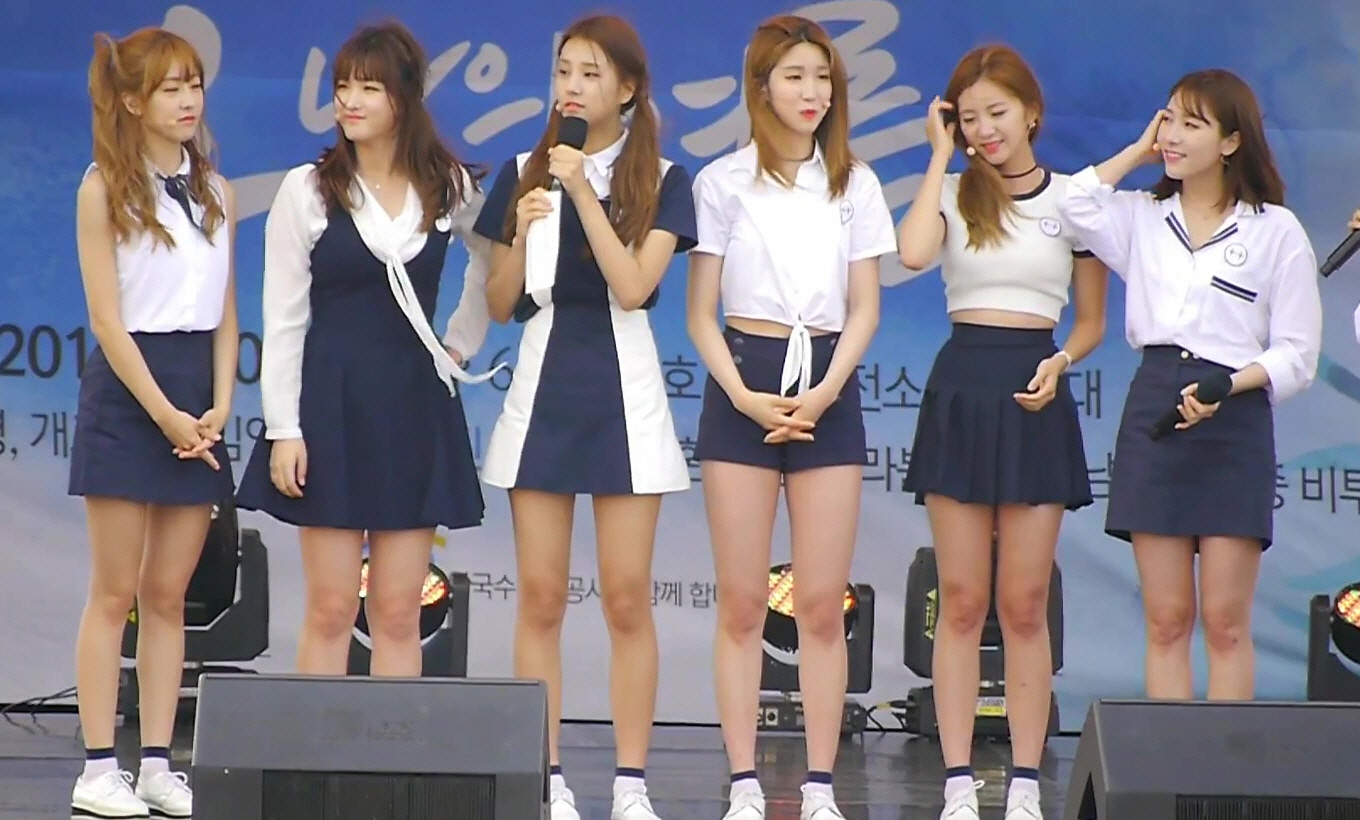
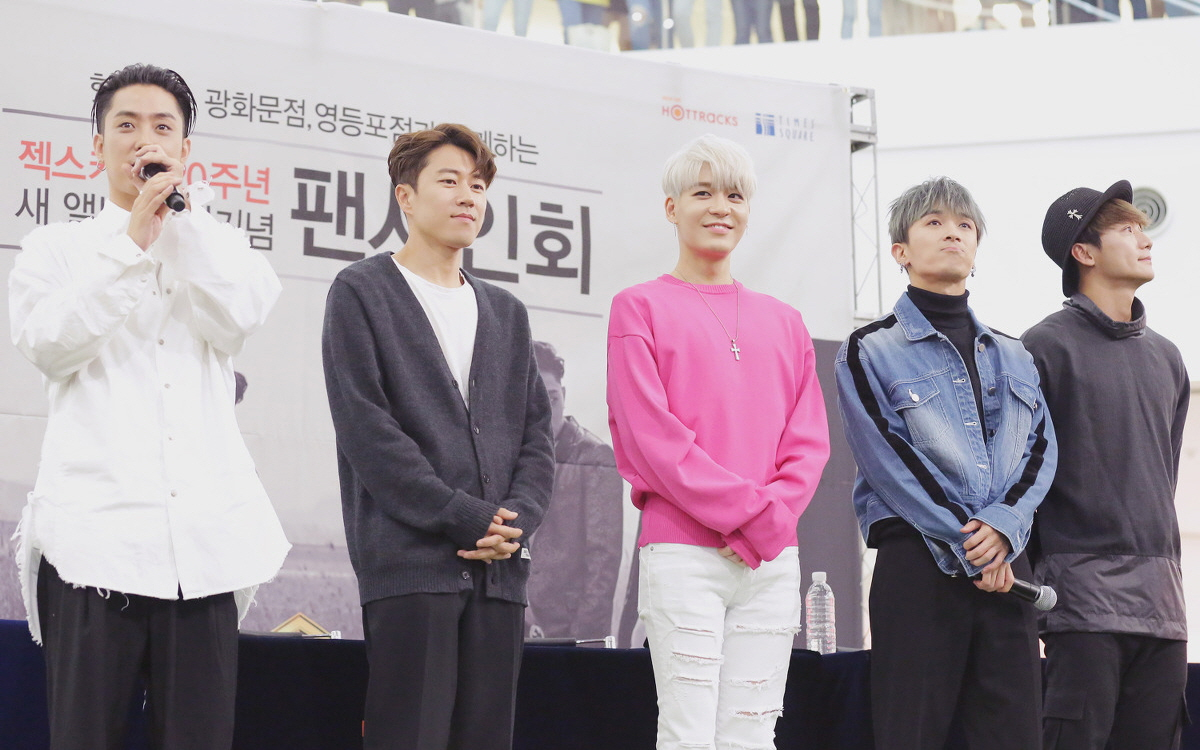
Laboum (top) and Sechs Kies (bottom) received their first ever music show wins with their Music Bank trophies for "Hwi Hwi" and "Be Well", respectively. Laboum member Ahn Sol-bin co-hosted the show in 2017.
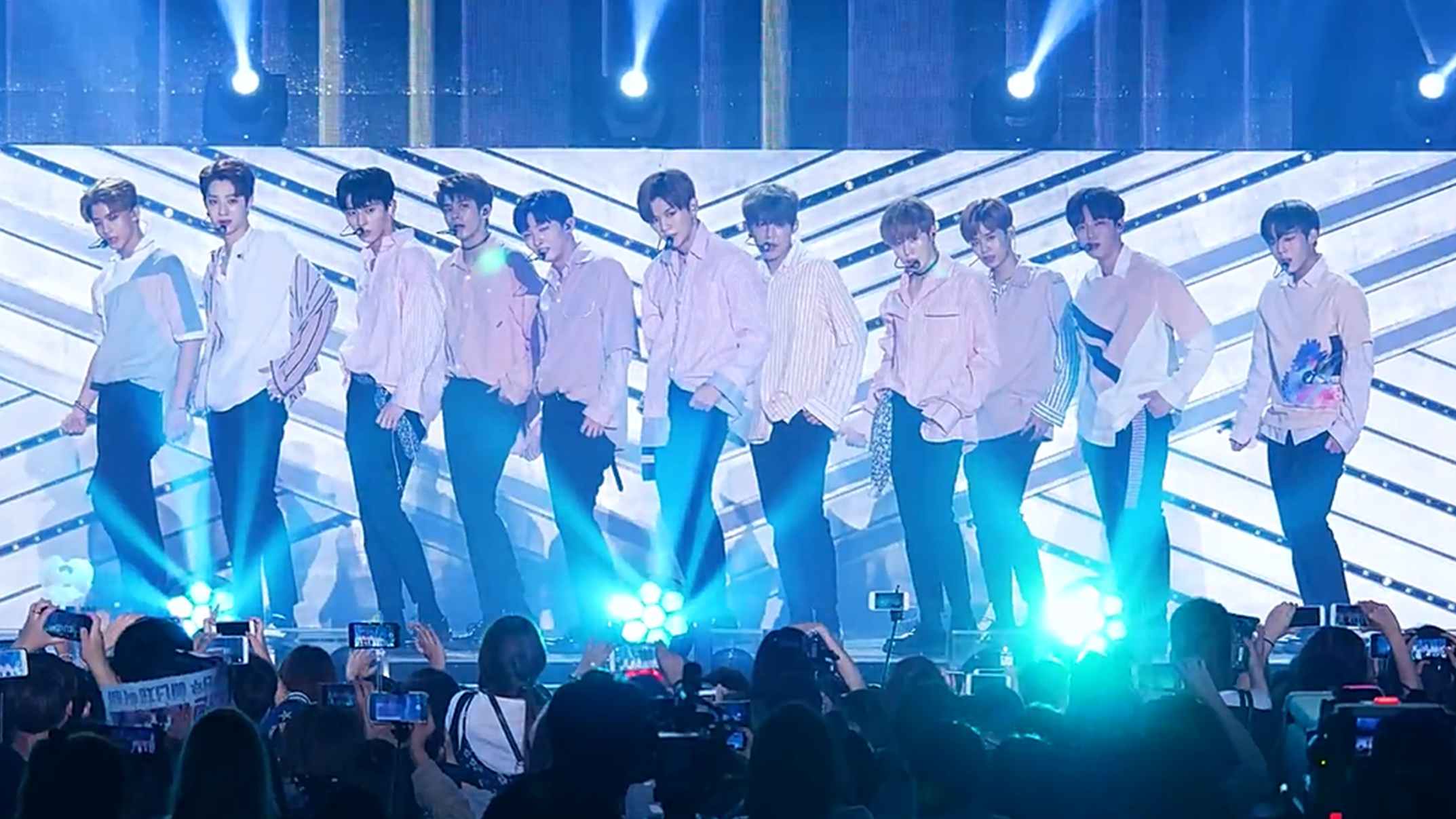
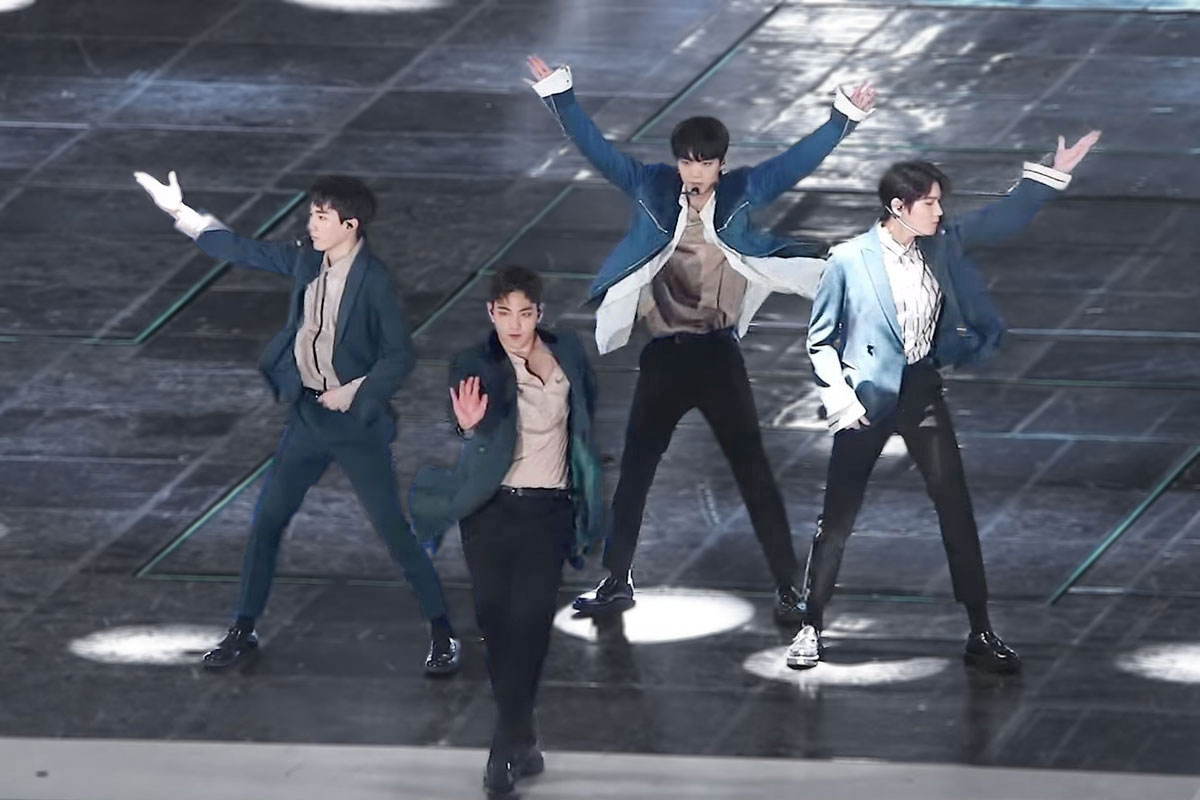
Wanna One (top) and NU'EST W (bottom) achieved their first broadcast music show awards on Music Bank with their debut singles "Energetic" and "Where You At", respectively.
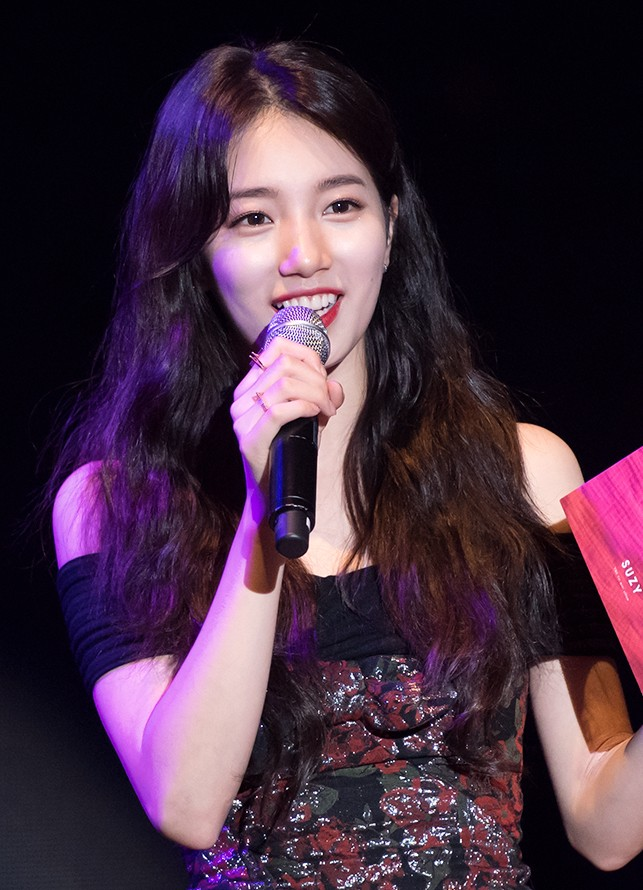
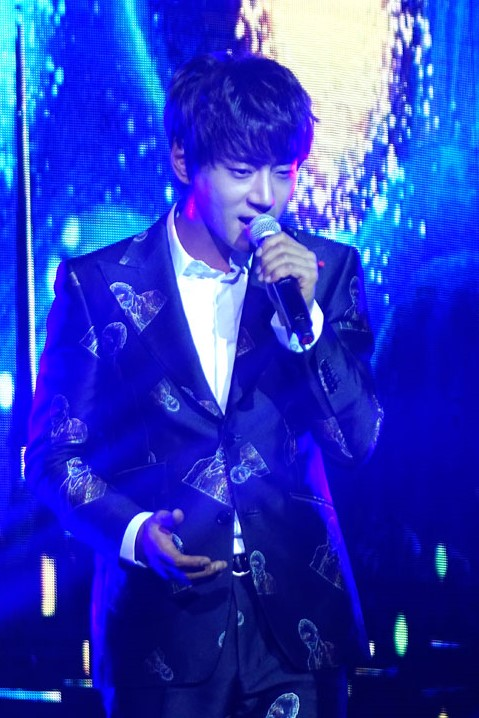
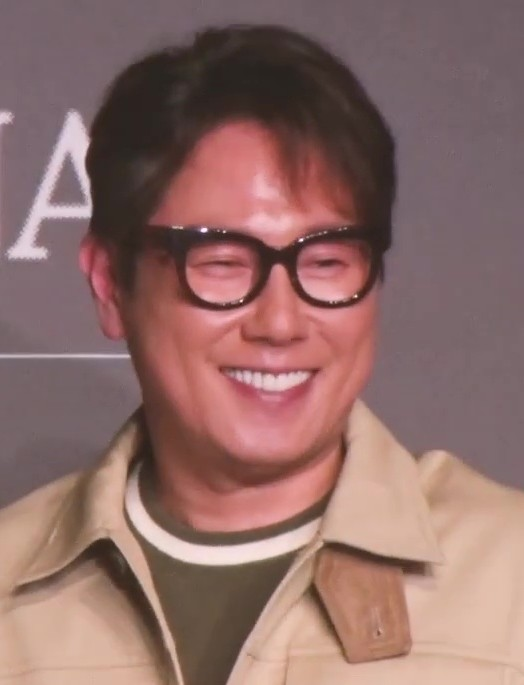
Miss A's Suzy (left), Hwang Chi-yeul (middle) and Yoon Jong-shin (right) won their first ever music show trophies for "Pretend", "A Daily Song" and "Like It", respectively.

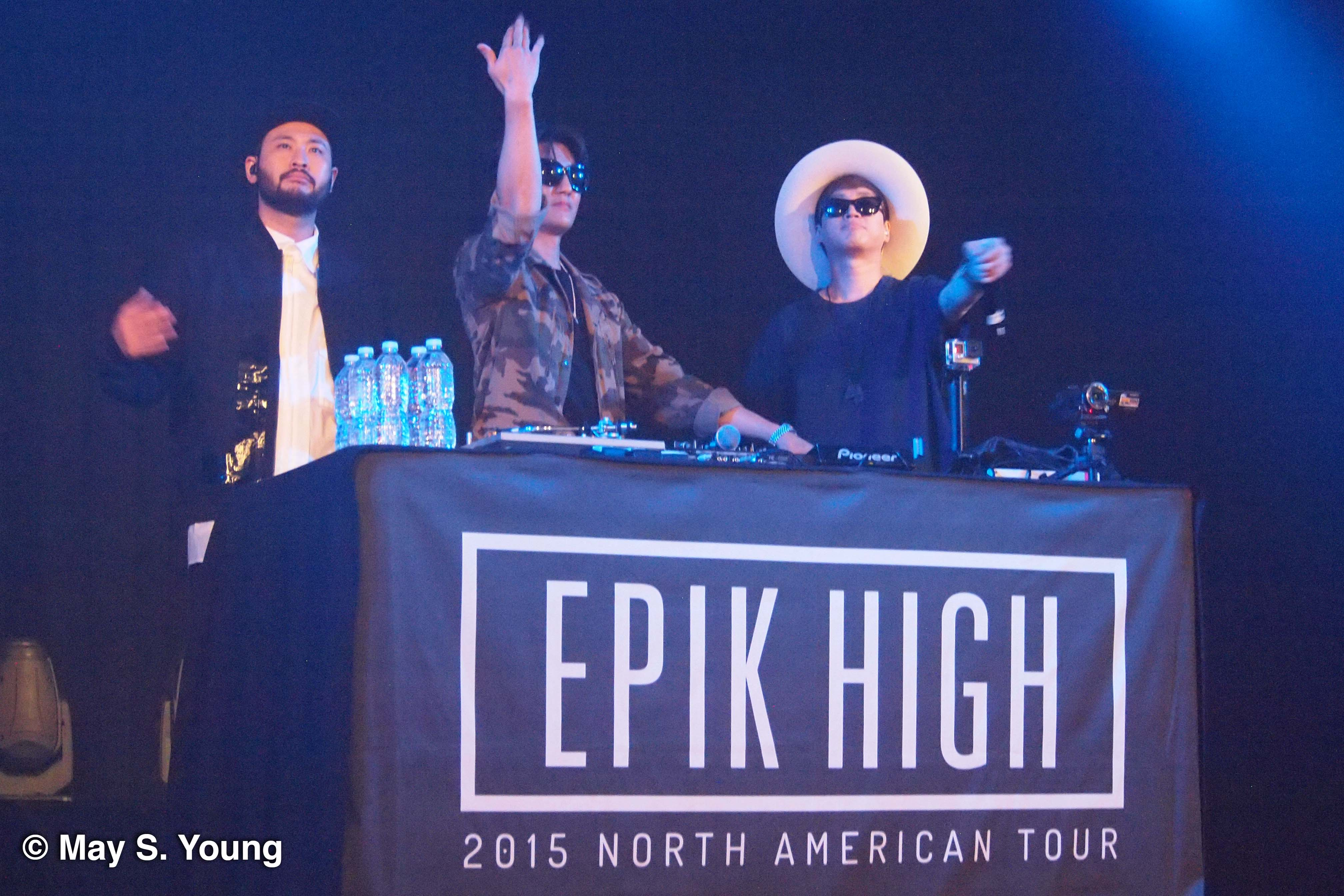
Epik High (pictured) won Music Bank for the first time for "Love Story".

Key
‡	Highest score in 2017
—	No show was broadcast

Chart history
Episode	Date	Artist	Song	Points	Ref.
868	January 6	Twice	"TT"	6,037	
869	January 13	Big Bang	"Fxxk It"	7,067	
870	January 20	Big Bang	"Fxxk It"	5,173	
— (Note: This week's winners were announced on the station's official website.)	January 27	Suzy	"Pretend"	4,288	
871	February 3	Suzy	"Pretend"	3,986	
872	February 10	Red Velvet	"Rookie"	6,275	
873	February 17	Red Velvet	"Rookie"	6,621	
874	February 24	BTS	"Spring Day"	13,250 ‡	
875	March 3	Twice	"Knock Knock"	12,175	
876 (Note: Episode 876 was recorded on March 10 and broadcast on March 17.)	March 10	Taeyeon	"Fine"	9,533	
—	March 17	Twice	"Knock Knock"	6,014	
877	March 24	Got7	"Never Ever"	8,695	
878	March 31	Highlight	"Plz Don't Be Sad"	8,502	
879	April 7	Highlight	"Plz Don't Be Sad"	6,204	
880	April 14	Highlight	"Plz Don't Be Sad"	5,231	
881	April 21	Teen Top	"Love Is"	6,189	
882	April 28	Laboum	"Hwi Hwi"	4,546	
—	May 5	IU	"Palette"	7,921	
883	May 12	Sechs Kies	"Be Well"	8,031	
884	May 19	IU	"Palette"	4,303	
885	May 26	Twice	"Signal"	11,362	
886	June 2	Seventeen	"Don't Wanna Cry"	9,627	
887	June 9	Twice	"Signal"	6,430	
888	June 16	Twice	"Signal"	6,501	
889	June 23	Hwang Chi-yeul	"A Daily Song"	6,380	
890	June 30	G-Dragon	"Untitled, 2014"	7,458	
891	July 7	Mamamoo	"Yes I Am"	7,641	
892	July 14	Heize	"You, Clouds, Rain"	7,174	
893	July 21	Red Velvet	"Red Flavor"	9,383	
894	July 28	Exo	"Ko Ko Bop"	12,181	
895	August 4	Exo	"Ko Ko Bop"	12,103	
—	August 11	GFriend	"Love Whisper"	7,486	
—	August 18	Wanna One	"Energetic"	10,823	
896	August 25	Wanna One	"Energetic"	11,014	
897	September 1	Yoon Jong-shin	"Like It"	7,420	
898	September 8	Yoon Jong-shin	"Like It"	6,707	
899	September 15	Exo	"Power"	9,914	
900	September 22	Exo	"Power"	6,929	
901	September 29	BTS	"DNA"	12,581	
—	October 6	BTS	"DNA"	8,876	
902	October 13	BTS	"DNA"	9,851	
903	October 20	NU'EST W	"Where You At"	7,153	
904	October 27	BtoB	"Missing You"	7,526	
905	November 3	Epik High	"Love Story"	5,562	
906	November 10	Twice	"Likey"	9,231	
907	November 17	Seventeen	"Clap"	6,265	
908	November 24	Wanna One	"Beautiful"	10,828	
909	December 1	Wanna One	"Beautiful"	6,676	
910	December 8	Minseo	"Yes"	4,873	
911	December 15	Naul	"Emptiness In Memory"	5,241	
912	December 22	Twice	"Heart Shaker"	6,880	
—	December 29	Twice	"Heart Shaker"	5,592	
