= List of Music Bank Chart winners (2011) =

Winners of South Korean music program Music Bank

Music Bank Chart winners (2011)

The Music Bank Chart is a record chart on the South Korean KBS television music program Music Bank. Every week, the show awards the best-performing single on the chart in the country during its live broadcast.

In 2011, 23 singles achieved a number one on the chart and 18 music acts were awarded first-place trophies.

== Chart history ==
Key
—	No show was held

Episode	Date	Artist	Song	Ref.
586	January 7	IU	"Good Day"	
587	January 14	TVXQ	"Keep Your Head Down"	
588	January 21	TVXQ	"Keep Your Head Down"	
589	January 28	TVXQ	"Keep Your Head Down"	
—	February 4	Secret	"Shy Boy"	
590	February 11	Secret	"Shy Boy"	
591	February 18	Secret	"Shy Boy"	
592	February 25	G.NA	"Black & White"	
593	March 4	BigBang	"Tonight"	
594	March 11	BigBang	"Tonight"	
595	March 18	BigBang	"Tonight"	
596	March 25	TVXQ	"Before U Go"	
597	April 1	CNBLUE	"Intuition"	
598	April 8	CNBLUE	"Intuition"	
599	April 15	CNBLUE	"Intuition"	
600	April 22	BigBang	"Love Song"	
601	April 29	f(x)	"Pinocchio (Danger)"	
602	May 6	Jay Park	"Abandoned (Feat. Dok2)"	
603	May 13	Jay Park	"Abandoned (Feat. Dok2)"	
604	May 20	f(x)	"Pinocchio (Danger)"	
—	May 27	Beast	"On Rainy Days"	
605	June 3	Beast	"Fiction"	
606	June 10	Beast	"Fiction"	
607	June 17	Kim Hyun-joong	"Break Down"	
608	June 24	Kim Hyun-joong	"Break Down"	
609	July 1	2PM	"Hands Up"	
610	July 8	2PM	"Hands Up"	
611	July 15	2PM	"Hands Up"	
612	July 22	2PM	"Hands Up"	
613	July 29	Miss A	"Good-bye Baby"	
614	August 5	2NE1	"I Am the Best"	
615	August 12	Super Junior	"Mr. Simple"	
616	August 19	Super Junior	"Mr. Simple"	
617	August 26	Super Junior	"Mr. Simple"	
618	September 2	Super Junior	"Mr. Simple"	
619	September 9	Super Junior	"Mr. Simple"	
620	September 16	Kara	"Step"	
621	September 23	Kara	"Step"	
622	September 30	Huh Gak	"Hello"	
623	October 7	Davichi	"Don't Say Goodbye"	
624	October 14	Davichi	"Don't Say Goodbye"	
625	October 21	Kim Hyun-joong	"Lucky Guy"	
626	October 28	Girls' Generation	"The Boys"	
627	November 4	Girls' Generation	"The Boys"	
628	November 11	Girls' Generation	"The Boys"	
629	November 18	Girls' Generation	"The Boys"	
630	November 25	Girls' Generation	"The Boys"	
631	December 2	Girls' Generation	"The Boys"	
632	December 9	IU	"You & I"	
633	December 16	IU	"You & I"	
634	December 23	IU	"You & I"	
—	December 30	IU	"You & I"	
