= Soobin (singer) =

South Korean singer (born 2000)

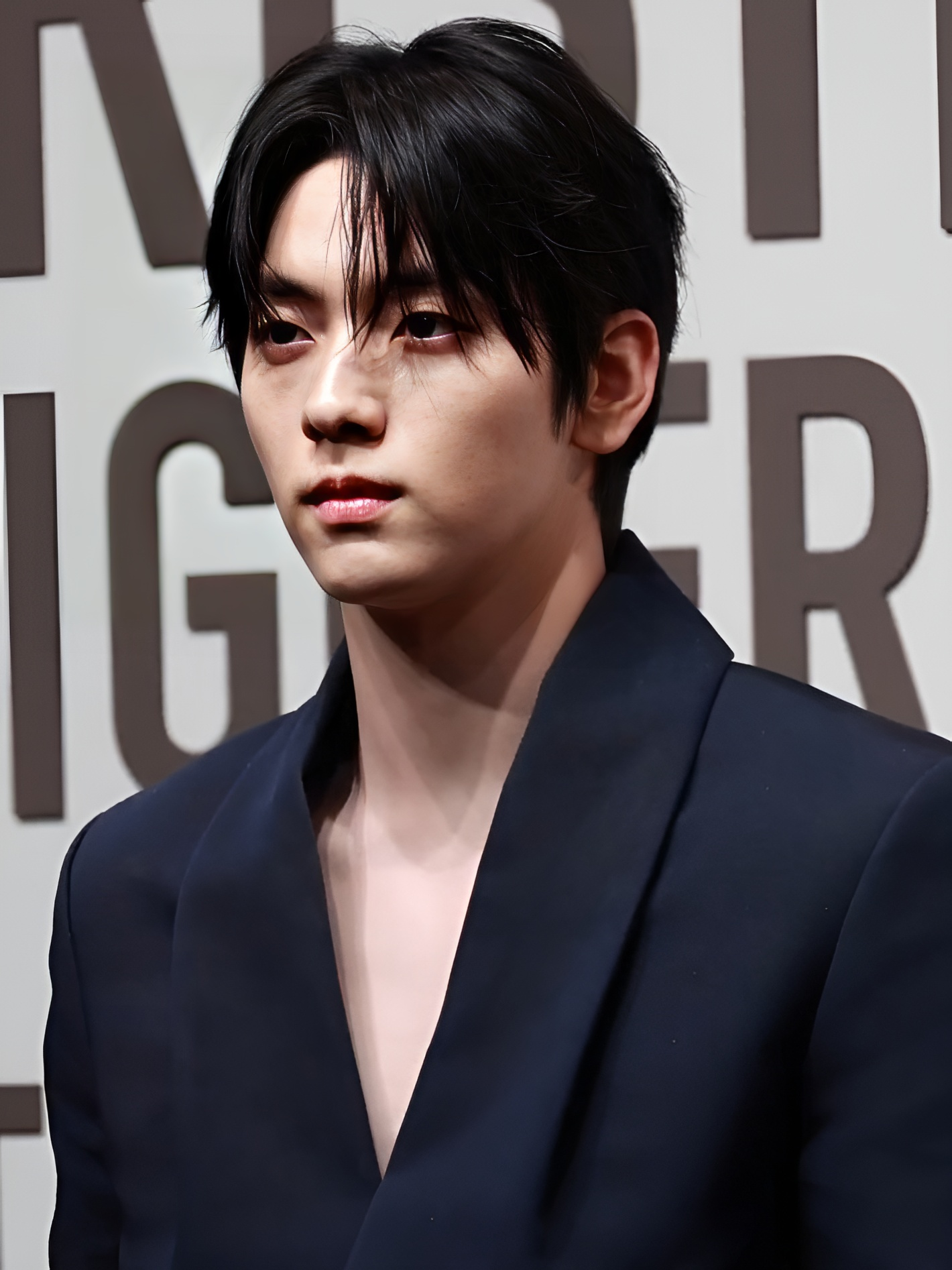
- Soobin in April 2025
- Born: Choi Soo-bin; December 5, 2000 (age 25); Ansan, South Korea
- Education: Global Cyber University
- Occupations: Singer; songwriter
- Years active: 2019–present
- Musical career
- Genre: K-pop
- Instrument: Vocals
- Label: Big Hit
- Member of: Tomorrow X Together

Korean name
- Hangul: 최수빈
- RR: Choe Subin
- MR: Ch'oe Subin

Signature
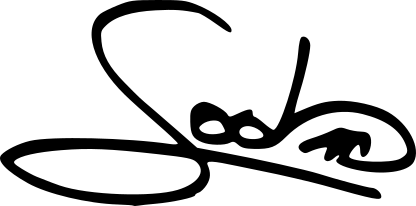

Choi Soo-bin (Korean: 최수빈; born December 5, 2000), known mononymously as Soobin, is a South Korean singer and songwriter. He is the leader of the South Korean boy band Tomorrow X Together, formed by Big Hit Entertainment in 2019.

== Early life and education ==
Choi Soo-bin was born on December 5, 2000, in Sangnok District, Ansan, South Korea. He is the youngest of three children, with an older brother and sister.

Soobin briefly attended Ansan High School before dropping out to focus on his training as an idol trainee. After passing the High School Graduation Equivalency Examination, he enrolled in Global Cyber University in 2019.

== Career ==
=== 2019–present: Debut with Tomorrow X Together and solo activities ===
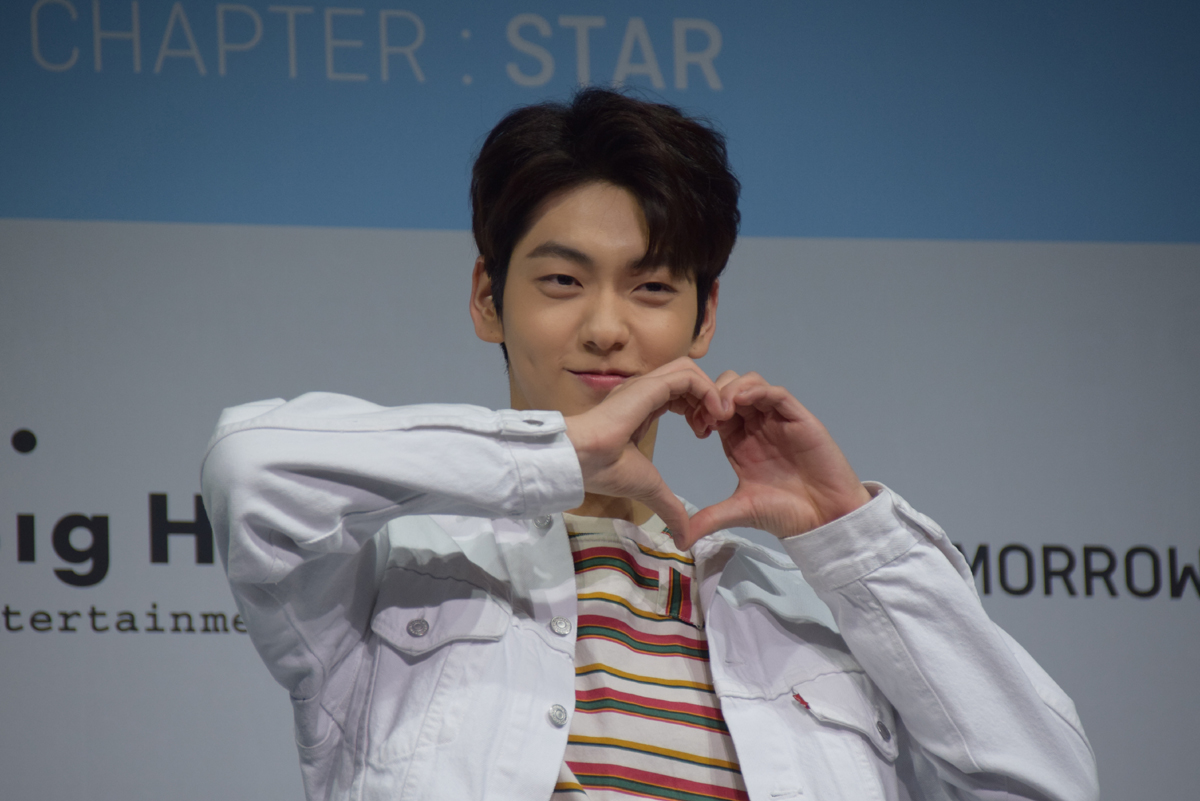
Soobin in March 2019

Soobin was the second member of Tomorrow X Together to be revealed, having undergone three years of training with Big Hit Entertainment. He debuted with the group on March 4, 2019, with the release of the extended play (EP), The Dream Chapter: Star. The EP peaked at number one on the Gaon Album Chart and the Billboard World Albums Chart.

On July 20, 2020, it was announced that Soobin would join Music Bank as the new host, alongside Arin of Oh My Girl. In recognition of their on-screen chemistry, they received the 'Best Couple Award' at the 2020 KBS Entertainment Awards. Soobin also served as a backstage host for the 2020 KBS Song Festival, co-hosting with Arin. He returned in the same role for the 2021 KBS Song Festival, joined by Arin, Jang Won-young, and Sunghoon of Enhypen.

In November 2024, Soobin began hosting My Faves' Fave, a web variety show on the Pixid YouTube channel where K-pop idols and other guests present their favorite things. The show was renewed for a second season in April 2025. On June 5, 2025, it was announced that Soobin would host the 34th Seoul Music Awards, alongside Kang Seung-yoon and Miyeon of I-dle. Later in 2025, he was cast as a co-host for the observational dating reality show Noona Is a Woman to Me, which premiered on KBS2 on October 27.

== Other ventures ==
=== Endorsements ===
In August 2025, Soobin was named youth ambassador for the cosmetics brand Into You. Two months later, on October 1, he was announced as a brand ambassador for the South Korean fashion label Covernat. As a member of Tomorrow X Together, he has also represented global luxury brands such as Dior. On September 8, 2026, Italian luxury fashion house Dolce & Gabbana announced Soobin as its global ambassador.

=== Philanthropy ===
On January 29, 2024, it was reported that Soobin had donated ₩100 million (US$74,760) to the Seoul Metropolitan Children's Hospital. ₩20 million of the total was designated specifically for the medical treatment of children with severe and urgent health conditions, while the remaining ₩80 million was allocated to improving the hospital's facilities and environment.

== Personal life ==
=== Health ===
On November 19, 2024, Big Hit Music announced that Soobin would temporarily suspend his activities due to health concerns. The company stated that he had been experiencing extreme fatigue and was advised by medical professionals to take time off for rest and recovery.

== Discography ==
=== Soundtrack appearances ===
Title	Year	Peak chart positions	Album
Title	Year	KOR	Album
"Rekindling Memories" (기억속 켜진불)	2026	164	Still Shining OST

=== Other charted songs ===
Title	Year	Peak chart positions	Album
Title	Year	KOR	Album
"Sunday Driver" (Note: credited to Tomorrow X Together, but the track is a solo by Soobin)	2025	101	The Star Chapter: Together

=== Songwriting credits ===
All song credits are adapted from the Korea Music Copyright Association's database unless stated otherwise.

List of songs, showing year released, artist name, and name of the album
Year	Title	Artist	Album	Composer	Lyricist
2020	"Maze in the Mirror"	Tomorrow X Together	The Dream Chapter: Eternity	Yes	Yes
2020	"Sweat"	Tomorrow X Together	Non-album single	Yes	Yes
2020	"Ghosting"	Tomorrow X Together	Minisode1: Blue Hour	Yes	Yes
2021	"Ice Cream"	Tomorrow X Together	The Chaos Chapter: Freeze	Yes	Yes
2021	"MOA Diary"	Tomorrow X Together	The Chaos Chapter: Fight or Escape	Yes	Yes
2021	"Sweet Dreams"	Tomorrow X Together	Non-album single	Yes	Yes
2023	"Happy Fools" (feat. Coi Leray)	Tomorrow X Together	The Name Chapter: Temptation	Yes	Yes
2023	"Blue Spring"	Tomorrow X Together	The Name Chapter: Freefall	Yes	Yes
2023	"Dreamer"	Tomorrow X Together	The Name Chapter: Freefall	Yes	Yes
2024	"Quarter Life"	Tomorrow X Together	Minisode 3: Tomorrow	Yes	Yes
2024	"Miracle"	Tomorrow X Together	Minisode 3: Tomorrow	Yes	Yes
2024	"Open Always Wins"	Tomorrow X Together	Non-album single	Yes	Yes
2024	"Heaven"	Tomorrow X Together	The Star Chapter: Sanctuary	Yes	Yes
2024	"Resist (Not Gonna Run Away)"	Tomorrow X Together	The Star Chapter: Sanctuary	Yes	Yes
2026	"Dream of Mine" (다음의 다음)	Tomorrow X Together	7th Year: A Moment of Stillness in the Thorns	Yes	Yes

== Filmography ==
=== Web shows ===
Year	Title	Role	Notes	Ref.
2024	My Bias' Bias	Host		

=== Hosting ===
Year	Title	Role	Notes	Ref.
2020–2021	Music Bank	Co-host	with Arin	
2020	2020 KBS Song Festival	Backstage MC	with Arin	
2021	2021 KBS Song Festival	Backstage MC	with Arin, Jang Won-young, and Sunghoon	

== Awards and nominations ==
Name of the award ceremony, year presented, category, nominee of the award, and the result of the nomination
Award ceremony	Year	Category	Nominee(s) / Work(s)	Result	Ref.
KBS Entertainment Awards	2020	Best Couple Award	Music Bank (with Arin)	Won	
KBS Entertainment Awards	2020	Rookie Award in Show/Variety Category	Music Bank	Nominated	
