= List of Music Bank Chart winners (2008) =

Winners of South Korean music program Music Bank

Music Bank Chart winners (2008)

The Music Bank Chart is a record chart on the South Korean KBS television music program Music Bank. Every week, the show awards the best-performing single on the chart in the country during its live broadcast.

In 2008, 21 singles achieved a number one on the chart and 17 music acts were awarded first-place trophies.

== Chart history ==
Key
—	No show was held

Episode	Date	Artist	Song	Ref.
445	January 4	Wonder Girls	"Tell Me"	
446	January 11	Big Bang	"Last Farewell"	
447	January 18	Haha	"You Are My Destiny"	
448	January 25	Toy	"Warm Hello"	
449	February 1	Big Bang	"Last Farewell"	
—	February 8	No chart and winner		
450	February 15	Park Ji-heon	"The Day I Miss You"	
451	February 22	Brown Eyed Girls	"L.O.V.E"	
452	February 29	Girls' Generation	"Kissing You"	
453	March 7	Jewelry	"One More Time"	
454	March 14	Jewelry	"One More Time"	
455	March 21	Jewelry	"One More Time"	
456	March 28	Jewelry	"One More Time"	
457	April 4	Jewelry	"One More Time"	
458	April 11	Jewelry	"One More Time"	
459	April 18	Jewelry	"One More Time"	
460	April 25	Lee Seung-gi	"I Will Give You Everything"	
461	May 2	MC Mong	"Circus"	
462	May 9	MC Mong	"Circus"	
463	May 16	MC Mong	"Circus"	
464	May 23	MC Mong	"Circus"	
465	May 30	MC Mong	"Circus"	
466	June 6	Wonder Girls	"So Hot"	
467	June 13	Wonder Girls	"So Hot"	
468	June 20	Wonder Girls	"So Hot"	
469	June 27	Wonder Girls	"So Hot"	
470	July 4	Wonder Girls	"So Hot"	
471	July 11	Wonder Girls	"So Hot"	
472	July 18	Davichi	"Love and War"	
473	July 25	Brown Eyes	"Don't Leave"	
474	August 1	Lee Hyori	"U-Go-Girl"	
475	August 8	Lee Hyori	"U-Go-Girl"	
—	August 15	Lee Hyori	"U-Go-Girl"	
476	August 29	Seo Taiji	"Moai"	
477	September 5	Big Bang	"Haru Haru"	
478	September 12	Big Bang	"Haru Haru"	
—	September 19	No chart and winner		
479	September 26	Big Bang	"Haru Haru"	
480	October 3	Wonder Girls	"Nobody"	
481	October 10	Wonder Girls	"Nobody"	
482	October 17	Wonder Girls	"Nobody"	
483	October 24	Wonder Girls	"Nobody"	
—	October 31	TVXQ	"Mirotic"	
484	November 7	Kim Jong-kook	"Today More Than Yesterday"	
485	November 14	Kim Jong-kook	"Today More Than Yesterday"	
486	November 21	Big Bang	"Sunset Glow"	
487	November 28	Big Bang	"Sunset Glow"	
488	December 5	Baek Ji-young	"Like Being Hit by a Bullet"	
489	December 12	Baek Ji-young	"Like Being Hit by a Bullet"	
490	December 19	Baek Ji-young	"Like Being Hit by a Bullet"	
491	December 26	Big Bang	"Sunset Glow"	
491	December 26	TVXQ	"Mirotic"	
