= List of Music Bank Chart winners (2010) =

Winners of South Korean music program Music Bank

Music Bank Chart winners (2010)

The Music Bank Chart is a record chart on the South Korean KBS television music program Music Bank. Every week, the show awards the best-performing single on the chart in the country during its live broadcast.

In 2010, 27 singles achieved a number one on the chart and 20 music acts were awarded first-place trophies.

== Chart history ==
Key
—	No show was held

Episode	Date	Artist	Song	Ref.
540	January 1	T-ara	"Bo Peep Bo Peep"	
541	January 8	T-ara	"Bo Peep Bo Peep"	
542	January 15	Gain & Jo Kwon	"I Happen to Love You"	
543	January 22	Gain & Jo Kwon	"I Happen to Love You"	
544	January 29	CNBLUE	"I'm a Loner"	
545	February 5	Girls' Generation	"Oh!"	
546	February 12	Girls' Generation	"Oh!"	
547	February 19	Girls' Generation	"Oh!"	
548	February 26	Girls' Generation	"Oh!"	
549	March 5	Girls' Generation	"Oh!"	
550	March 12	Kara	"Lupin"	
551	March 19	Kara	"Lupin"	
552	March 26	Kara	"Lupin"	
—	April 2	Girls' Generation	"Run Devil Run"	
—	April 9	Girls' Generation	"Run Devil Run"	
—	April 16	Rain	"Love Song"	
—	April 23	Rain	"Love Song"	
553	April 30	Rain	"Love Song"	
554	May 7	2PM	"Without U"	
555	May 14	2PM	"Without U"	
556	May 21	Super Junior	"Bonamana"	
557	May 28	Super Junior	"Bonamana"	
558	June 4	Super Junior	"Bonamana"	
559	June 11	SS501	"Love Ya"	
560	June 18	SS501	"Love Ya"	
561	June 25	Girls' Generation	"Oh!"	
562	July 2	IU	"Nagging"	
563	July 9	Super Junior	"No Other"	
564	July 16	Taeyang	"I Need a Girl"	
565	July 23	Miss A	"Bad Girl Good Girl"	
566	July 30	Shinee	"Lucifer"	
567	August 6	Shinee	"Lucifer"	
568	August 13	BoA	"Hurricane Venus"	
569	August 20	BoA	"Hurricane Venus"	
570	August 27	BoA	"Hurricane Venus"	
571	September 3	Homme	"I Was Able to Eat Well"	
572	September 10	F.T. Island	"Love Love Love"	
573	September 17	2NE1	"Can't Nobody"	
574	September 24	2NE1	"Go Away"	
575	October 1	2NE1	"Go Away"	
576	October 8	Beast	"Breath"	
—	October 15	Shinee	"Hello"	
577	October 22	2PM	"I'll Be Back"	
578	October 29	2PM	"I'll Be Back"	
579	November 5	Girls' Generation	"Hoot"	
580	November 12	Girls' Generation	"Hoot"	
581	November 19	Girls' Generation	"Hoot"	
—	November 26	Girls' Generation	"Hoot"	
582	December 3	Girls' Generation	"Hoot"	
583	December 10	Kara	"Jumping"	
584	December 17	Girls' Generation	"Oh!"	
584	December 17	Sistar	"How Dare You"	
585	December 24	IU	"Good Day"	
—	December 31	IU	"Good Day"	
