= 2017 KBS Song Festival =

South Korean annual music festival

- Also known as: KBS Gayo Daechukje
- Presented by: Chanyeol; Irene; Jin; Sana; Solar; Mingyu; Yerin; Kang Daniel
- Starring: BTS; Exo; Seventeen; Wanna One; Red Velvet; Mamamoo; Gfriend; Twice; Hwang Chi-yeul; HyunA; The Unit

Production
- Production locations: KBS Hall; Seoul, South Korea
- Production company: Korean Broadcasting System

Original release
- Network: KBS 2TV; KBS World
- Release: December 29, 2017

The 2017 KBS Song Festival was the 8th edition of KBS Song Festival, held on December 29, 2017, live from KBS Hall.

This year's theme was "Concert and Confessions", with the confessions part stated as a double meaning of "Confessions of the heart and Go Back" and will give stars a special opportunity to open their hearts up to fans as they send off 2017.

== Broadcast ==
On December 7, 2017, it was announced that the 8th KBS Song Festival will air on December 29 and will be held at KBS Hall. It was also revealed, that unlike previous years, this time the show will be in a smaller scale as a Music Bank end-of-year episode, due to the ongoing KBS strike.

On December 15, it was revealed that only eight teams have been invited to the show. The teams are BTS, Seventeen, Exo, Wanna One, Red Velvet, Mamamoo, Gfriend, and Twice, with additional participation of the mentors of KBS2's The Unit, including Hwang Chi Yeol, HyunA, and Taemin. It also stated that theme for this year will be "Concert and Confessions" and will feel like a mini-concert.

A few days later, it was announced that a representative from each group will be a host with the first half presented by Red Velvet's Irene, BTS's Jin, Exo's Chanyeol, and Twice's Sana and the second half presented by Mamamoo's Solar, Seventeen's Mingyu, Gfriend's Yerin, and Wanna One's Kang Daniel. On December 25, it was confirmed that Taemin will not be performing on this edition due to various circumstances.

== Performers ==
Artist(s)	Song(s)
Part 1
All Performers	"Music is My Life"
Mamamoo	"Mr. Ambiguous", "Piano Man", "Um Oh Ah Yeah", 2017 Hit Song Medley and "Yes I Am"
Seventeen	"Don't Wanna Cry" (Orch Ver.), "Habit" (Vocal Unit), "Check-In" (Hip Hop Unit), "Who" (Performance Unit), "Boom Boom" (Rock Ver.) and "Clap" (Remix Ver.)
GFriend	"Fingertip", "Just A Feeling" (S.E.S. Cover), "Me Gustas Tu" and "Love Whisper"
Hyuna	"Red" and "Lip & Hip"
Hwang Chi-yeul	"Confession" and "A Daily Song"
Wanna One	"Energetic", "Never", "Burn It Up", "Beautiful" and "Pick Me" (Concert Ver.)
Part 2
The Unit	"Stay", "Chained Up", "Who's Your Mama?" and "My Turn"
Red Velvet	"Happily Ever After", "Rookie", "Peek-a-boo" and "Red Flavor"
Twice	"Signal" (Remix Ver.), "Heart Shaker", "4 Minutes", "Greedy", "Knock Knock" (Carol Ver.) and "Likey"
BTS	"Spring Day", "Lost", "BTS Cypher 4", "DNA" and "Not Today"
Exo	"Call Me Baby", "Touch It", "For Life", "Ko Ko Bop" and "Power"
All Performers	"Love and Remember"
