= 2021 KBS Song Festival =

South Korean annual music festival

- Also known as: 2021 KBS Gayo Daechukje
- KBS 2021 가요대축제
- Presented by: Astro's Cha Eun-woo, AOA's Seolhyun, and SF9's Rowoon
- Starring: Red Velvet; Oh My Girl; Seventeen; NCT U Kang Daniel; Sunmi; Lee Mu-jin; Astro; Brave Girls; SF9; Kim Woo-seok; STAYC; Stray Kids; NU'EST; The Boyz; Aespa; Enhypen; Itzy; TXT; Ive

Production
- Production locations: KBS Hall; Seoul, South Korea
- Production company: Korean Broadcasting System

Original release
- Network: KBS 2TV; KBS World
- Release: December 17, 2021

The 2021 KBS Song Festival (Korean: KBS 2021 가요대축제) was the 11th edition of KBS Song Festival, held on December 17, 2021, broadcast by KBS at 8:30 pm KST on the 17th to 12:15 am on the 18th. A total of 20 teams have been invited to the show.

This year, in a situation where K-pop singers and fans could not meet due to Corona 19, the theme is with 'WITH', which means to go forward 'together' with strength.

== Background ==
On November 26, it was announced that Astro's Cha Eun-woo, AOA's Seolhyun and SF9's Rowoon would be hosting this year's festival and the date of the festival will be on December 17.

On December 3, it was revealed that Red Velvet, Oh My Girl, Kang Daniel, The Boyz, Stray Kids, Itzy, TXT, Enhypen, Aespa, and Lee Mu-jin would be part of the first line-up. On December 8, it was announced that Seventeen, Sunmi, NU'EST, Astro, Brave Girls, NCT, SF9, Kim Woo-seok, STAYC, and Ive will be part of the second line-up.

On December 13, KBS released a video featuring several artists dancing and singing a song that encourages everyone to tune in to the festival. The video features TXT's Soobin and Huening Kai, Stray Kids's Felix, Oh My Girl's Hyojung and Arin, NCT's Shotaro, Brave Girls's Minyoung and Eunji, Enhypen's Sunghoon and Ni-Ki, Aespa's Ningning, Ive's Wonyoung and Leeseo, SF9's Jaeyoon and Youngbin, Kang Daniel, and STAYC's Seeun and Yoon. The song is a parody of Baby Shark.

== Schedule ==
Sections	Date	Airtime
The Beginning and Photo Wall	December 17, 2021	19:00–20:30 KST
Main Event	December 17, 2021	20:30~ KST

== Presenters ==
- The Beginning
- Backstage – Oh My Girl's Arin, TXT's Choi Soo-bin, Ive's Jang Won-young and Enhypen's Sunghoon
- Main Event – Astro's Cha Eun-woo, AOA's Seolhyun, and SF9's Rowoon

== Performers ==
The following individuals and groups, listed in order of appearance or performed musical numbers.

Artist(s)	Song(s)
Part 1
All performers	"With You" by The Blue
Ive	"Eleven"
Lee Mu-jin	"Traffic Light"
Enhypen	Intro + "Tamed-Dashed"
STAYC	"ASAP" "Stereotype"
Legend of K-POP
TXT	"Candy" by H.O.T
Enhypen	"The Way This Guy Lives" by Sechs Kies
TXT	"Bad Guy" by Rain
Enhypen	"Come Back to Me" by Se7en
TXT	"Mirotic" by TVXQ
TXT's Yeonjun, Taehyun and Huening Kai Enhypen's Ni-ki and Heeseung	"Bang Bang Bang" by Big Bang
Enhypen	"Growl" by EXO
TXT Enhypen	"Fire" by BTS
Move to the Beat
Kim Woo-seok	"Sugar"
Brave Girls	Intro + "Rollin'" "Chi Mat Ba Ram"
Part 2
Vocal Special Stage
V4: Kim Woo-seok; Astro's Yoon San-ha; The Boyz's Hyunjae; Stray Kids's Seungmin	"Paradise (2021 Rock and roll Version)" from Boys Over Flowers
Brave Girls's Minyoung and SF9's Inseong	"Don't Forget Me" from Iris
SF9's Rowoon	"No Goodbye in Love" from The King's Affection
TXT	"Loser=Lover" "0x1=Lovesong (I Know I Love You)"
SF9	Intro + "Trauma"
The Boyz	"Candles" "Thrill Ride" (Christmas Version)
Oh My Girl	"Secret Garden" "Dun Dun Dance"
Stray Kids	Intro + "Thunderous"
Astro	"One" "After Midnight"
Kang Daniel	"What Are You Up To" "2U" "Who U Are" "Antidote"
NCT U	"Universe (Let's Play Ball)"
Seventeen's Seungkwan and DK	"Together"
Special Girl Group Stage
F9: Red Velvet's Wendy; Oh My Girl's Jiho; Brave Girls Yuna; Itzy's Chaeryeong and Yuna; STAYC's Sieun and Yoon; Ive's Wonyoung and Yujin	"Way to Go" by Girls' Generation
Part 3
Aespa	Intro + "Next Level" "Savage"
NU'EST	"Inside Out" "Black"
Itzy	"Mafia in the Morning" "Loco"
Sunmi	"Tail" (League of Legends ver.) "You Can't Sit with Us"
Seventeen	"Crush" + "Ready to love" "Rock with You"
Red Velvet	Intro + "Psycho" "Queendom"
All performers	"All for You (2021 Christmas Version)" from Reply 1997
