= Arin (singer) =

South Korean singer and actress (born 1999)

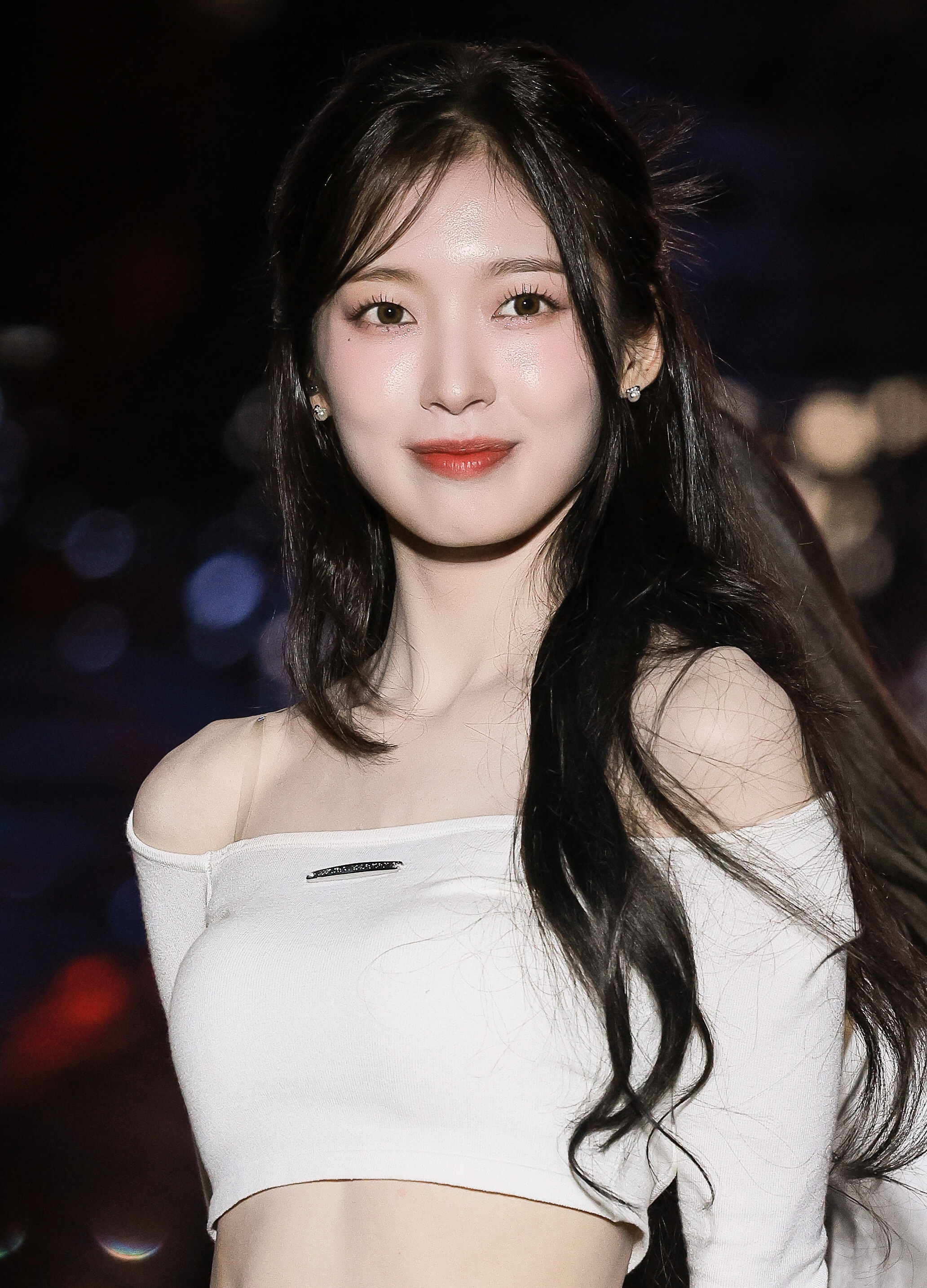
- Arin in October 2024
- Born: Choi Ye-won; June 18, 1999 (age 27); Busan, South Korea
- Education: School of Performing Arts Seoul
- Occupations: Singer; actress
- Years active: 2015–present
- Agent: ATRP
- Musical career
- Genre: K-pop
- Instrument: Vocals
- Labels: WM; DSP
- Member of: Oh My Girl; Oh My Girl Banhana

Korean name
- Hangul: 최예원
- Hanja: 崔乂園
- RR: Choe Yewon
- MR: Ch'oe Yewŏn

Stage name
- Hangul: 아린
- RR: Arin
- MR: Arin

Choi Ye-won (Korean: 최예원; born June 18, 1999), known professionally as Arin (아린), is a South Korean singer and actress. She is a member of South Korean girl group Oh My Girl.

== Early life ==
Arin was born Choi Ye-won, on June 18, 1999, in Busan. She attended Dongduk Middle School and School of Performing Arts Seoul.

== Career ==
=== 2015–2019: Debut with Oh My Girl and other activities ===
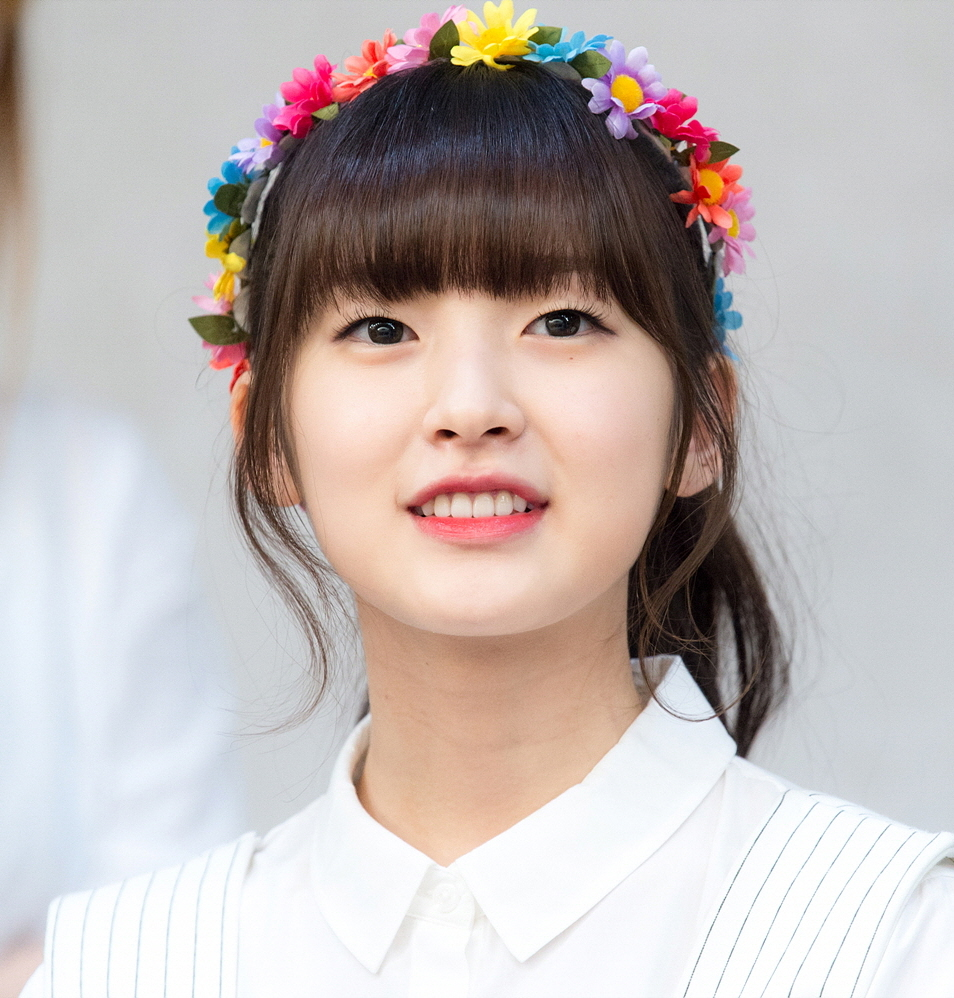
Arin in July 2015

Arin at an Oh My Girl guerilla performance in June 2016

On April 20, 2015, Arin debuted as a member of Oh My Girl. She first performed their debut single on SBS MTV's The Show on April 21. On April 2, 2018, Arin debuted in Oh My Girl's first sub-unit, Oh My Girl Banhana. On September 7, 2019, it was announced that Arin would be appearing on XtvN's The Ultimate Watchlist 2. In August 2019, it was confirmed that Arin would be taking part in Queendom.

=== 2020–present: Solo activities ===
On March 10, 2020, Arin was cast as Oh Na-ri in Naver TV's web series The World of My 17. On July 20, Arin was announced as the new host for Music Bank with Choi Soo-bin of TXT. For their performance on the program, they were awarded with the Best Couple Award at the 2020 KBS Entertainment Awards. Their last broadcast from the role was on October 1, 2021. On July 26, 2026, it was announced that they were confirmed to star in Promoter alongside Lee Hanee, Park Yoon-ho, Kim Sung-kyun, and Kim Jin-wook.

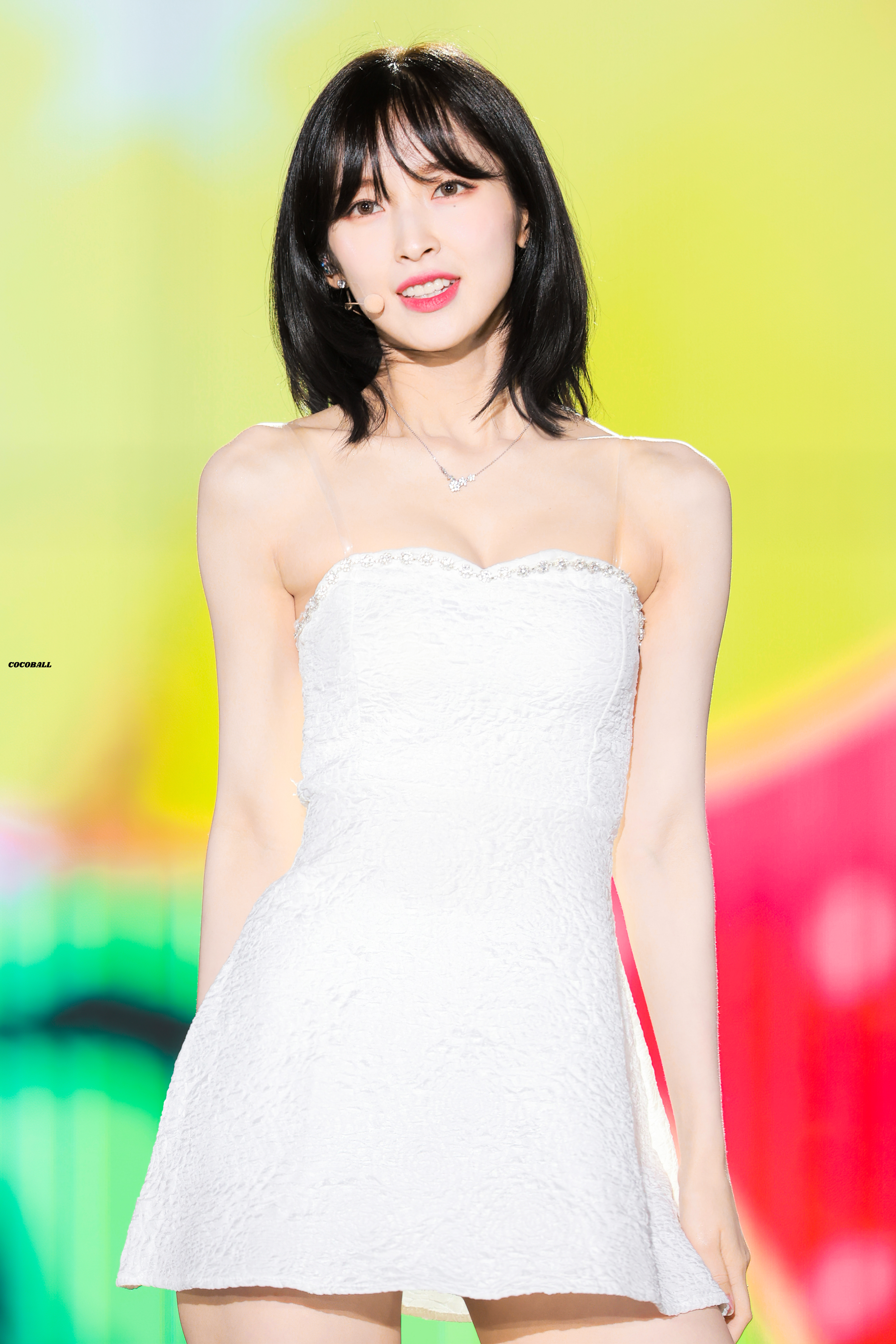
Arin during 2022 Dream Concert in Seoul Olympic Stadium

In March 2021, it was announced that Arin had been cast in the Netflix anthology movie Urban Myths. In June 2022, she was cast in a supporting role in the tvN hit fantasy period drama Alchemy of Souls. In 2023, Arin starred in the tvN short-form drama Summer Love Machine Blues. On September 4, 2023, Arin was cast in the webtoon-based mystery drama S Line alongside Lee Soo-hyuk and Lee Da-hee. On August 2, 2024, Arin was cast in the webtoon-based romantic comedy My Girlfriend Is the Man!.

On May 8, 2025, it was announced that Arin had ended her contract with WM Entertainment, but would remain a member of Oh My Girl. On June 10, Arin signed an exclusive contract with ATRP.

== Other ventures ==
=== Philanthropy ===
In December 2020, Arin secretly donated ₩6 million to her hometown Busan Elderly Welfare Center.

On June 18, 2021, it was announced that Arin donated ₩30 million to The Beautiful Foundation in honor of her 22nd birthday. Her donations were used to support young adults living alone and who have been discharged from child care facilities and foster care. In December 2021, she collaborated with Clarins and World Vision International in order to deliver Christmas gift boxes to low-income families.

On May 16, 2022, Arin donated ₩20 million to The Beautiful Foundation on Coming-of-Age Day. Four days later, she teamed up with Clarins to plant 1,459 trees in Jamwon Hangang Riverside Park in honor of World Bee Day. On August 11, Arin donated ₩20 million to help those affected by the 2022 South Korean floods through the Hope Bridge Korea Disaster Relief Association. In December, Arin donated 25,000 briquettes worth ₩21 million to Busan Briquette Bank.

=== Endorsements ===
On March 5, 2020, Arin became the brand model for South Korean clothing brand BYC. In July 2020, she became a global brand muse for the French beauty brand Clarins. In 2021, she became an advertising model for Kumbokju's cham soju. In June 2022, she was selected to participate in Pepsi's promotional single "Blue & Black", a collaboration song between Oh My Girl's Hyojung and Arin, Ive's Jang Won-young and Leeseo, and Cravity's Serim and Jungmo. The following month, she was selected as a promotional model for Busan's bid to host the upcoming world's fair Expo 2030. In August 2023, she was selected as an advertising model for the South Korean mobile MMORPG Luna: Moonlight Chronicles.

== Discography ==
=== Promotional singles ===
List of promotional singles, with selected chart positions
Title	Year	Peak positions	Album
Title	Year	KOR Down.	Album
"Blue & Black" (Note: "Blue & Black" was released as a promotional single in collaboration with Pepsi.) (with Wonyoung, Leeseo, Hyojung, Serim & Jungmo)	2022	35	Non-album single

=== Soundtrack appearances ===
Title	Year	Album
"Lovey Dovey" (with Yoon San-ha of Astro)	2025	My Girlfriend Is the Man! OST

== Filmography ==
=== Film ===
Year	Title	Role	Notes	Ref.
2022	Urban Myths	Ji-hyun	Netflix Film	
2026	Mad Dance Office	Hae-ri		
TBA	Moral Family			

=== Television series ===
Year	Title	Role	Notes	Ref.
2022–2023	Alchemy of Souls	Jin Cho-yeon	Part 1–2	
2023	Drama Stage	Yoo Deu-rim	Episode: "Summer, Lovemachine, Blues"	
2025	My Girlfriend Is the Man!	Kim Ji-eun		

=== Web series ===
Year	Title	Role	Notes	Ref.
2020	The World of My 17	Oh Na-ri	Season 1	
2025	S-Line	Hyeon-heup		

=== Television shows ===
Year	Title	Role	Notes	Ref.
2019	Queendom	Contestant	with Oh My Girl members	
2019	The Ultimate Watchlist	Cast member	Season 2	

=== Hosting ===
Year	Title	Role	Notes	Ref.
2020–2021	Music Bank	Co-host	with Soobin	
2020	2020 KBS Song Festival	Backstage MC	with Soobin	
2021	2021 KBS Song Festival	Backstage MC	with Soobin, Jang Won-young, and Sunghoon	

== Awards and nominations ==
Name of the award ceremony, year presented, category, nominee of the award, and the result of the nomination
Award ceremony	Year	Category	Nominee / Work	Result	Ref.
Asia Model Awards (Note: Asia Model Awards is an annual ceremony that recognizes Asia's top models and celebrities.)	2022	Rising Star Award, Actress	Alchemy of Souls	Won	
Blue Dragon Series Awards	2026	Best New Actress	S Line	Nominated	
KBS Entertainment Awards	2020	Rookie Award in Show/Variety Category	Music Bank	Nominated	
KBS Entertainment Awards	2020	Best Couple Award	Music Bank (with Soobin)	Won	
