= KBS Song Festival =

South Korean televised music special

- Logo of the 2021 KBS Gayo Daechukje
- Hangul: KBS 가요대축제
- Hanja: KBS 歌謠大祝祭
- RR: KBS gayodaechukje
- MR: KBS kayodaech'ukche
- Genre: Music
- Country of origin: South Korea
- Original language: Korean

Production
- Production companies: Tongyang Broadcasting Company (1965–1980); Korean Broadcasting System (1981–present)

Original release
- Network: Tongyang Broadcasting Company (1965–1980); KBS 1TV (1981–1994); KBS 2TV (1995–present); KBS World (2003–present)
- Release: 1965 – present

Related
- 2021 KBS Song Festival; 2022 KBS Song Festival

The KBS Song Festival (Korean: KBS 가요대축제; RR: KBS gayodaechukje) is an annual South Korean music show that airs on the Korean Broadcasting System (KBS) at the end of every year. It first aired in 1965 as an awards show, but KBS discontinued the awards ceremony in 2006. It has continued since as a music festival without giving awards most years. However, awards were given in 2013.

== History ==
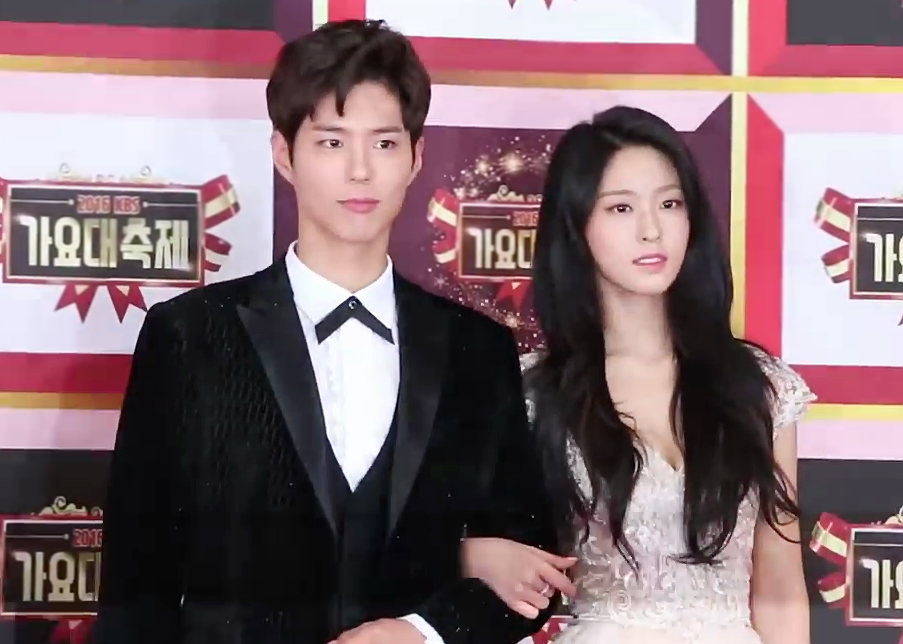
Park Bo-gum and Seolhyun, hosts of 2016 KBS Song Festival

The program was first broadcast in 1965 by the Tongyang Broadcasting Company (TBC), where it was known as the TBC Broadcast Music Awards (Korean: TBC 방송가요대상). Singer Choi Hee-Joon won the first award in 1965. Separate awards were then given for male and female artists from 1966 to 1986

In 1981, the South Korean government forced TBC to merge with the Korean Broadcasting System (KBS). Following the merger, the program's name was changed to the KBS Music Awards (KBS 가요대상; KBS gayodaesang). It aired on KBS1 every year on 30 December until 1994, when the program moved to KBS2.

In 2005, Kim Jong-kook became the last singer to win the KBS Music Award. In 2006, the program's name was changed to the KBS Song Festival, and the network turned the program into a non-competitive music festival rather than an awards show.

Between 2006 and 2016, the festival typically featured performances by 20 to 30 K-pop groups and singers. However, in 2017, KBS scaled back the festival to include only eight groups, two singers, and contestants from the KBS2 reality show The Unit.

The event has always taken place at KBS Hall, with two exceptions. In 2015, the event was held in Gocheok Sky Dome and for the 2019 event, it was held in KINTEX.

The 2018 KBS Song Festival with the theme, "A Huge Fantastical Party", was held at the KBS Hall on 28 December 2018.

In 2023, the usual Song Festival was replaced by "Music Bank Global Festival", with the event held in both Saitama, Japan and Seoul, South Korea respectively.

== Hosts ==
Year	Hosts	Ref
2006	Han Suk-joon, Hwang Soo-kyung	
2007	Han Suk-joon, Soo Kyung-hwang, Son Beom-su	
2008	Han Suk-joon, Hwang Soo Kyung, Park Sa-im	
2009	Han Suk-joon, Soo Kyung-hwang, Kim Kyung-ran	
2010	Han Suk-joon, Park Eun-young, Jun Hyun-moo	
2011	Lee Hwi-jae, Park Sa-im, Jun Hyun-moo	
2012	Sung Si-kyung, Yoona (SNSD), Jung Yong-hwa (CNBLUE)	
2013	Lee Hwi-jae, Suzy (Miss A), Yoon Shi-yoon	
2014	Lee Hwi-jae, Yoona (SNSD), Taecyeon (2PM)	
2015	Lee Hwi-jae, Hani, (EXID), Taecyeon (2PM)	
2016	Park Bo-gum, Seolhyun (AOA)	
2017	Part I: Jin (BTS), Sana (Twice), Chanyeol (EXO), Irene (Red Velvet) Part II: Mingyu (Seventeen), Solar (Mamamoo), Kang Daniel (Wanna One), Yerin (GFriend)	
2018	Chanyeol (EXO), Dahyun (Twice), Jin (BTS)	
2019	Shin Dong-Yup, Irene (Red Velvet), Park Jin-young (Got7)	
2020	Cha Eun-woo (Astro), Shin Ye-eun, Yunho (TVXQ)	
2021	Cha Eun-woo (Astro), Seolhyun (AOA), Rowoon (SF9)	
2022	Na In-woo, Jang Won-young (IVE), Kim Shin-young	
2023	Part 1: Rowoon, Jang Won-young (IVE); Part 2: Rowoon, Go Min-si, Lee Young-ji	
2024	Japan: Moon Sang-min, Shin Ye-eun, Hong Eun-chae (Le Sserafim); Korea: Zico, Jang Won-young (IVE), Kim Young-dae	
2025	Jang Do-yeon, Moon Sang-min, Minju (Illit)	

== Award recipients ==
=== TBC Broadcast Music Awards (1965–1980) ===
Year	Artist	Song
1965	Choi Hee-joon	"Every Corner of Korea" (팔도강산)
1966	Choi Hee-joon	"Student Boarder" (하숙생)
1966	Choi Yang-sook	
1967	Choi Hee-joon	
1967	Kim Sang-hee	
1968	Bae Ho	
1968	Lee Mi-ja	
1969	Nam Jin	"My Heart Aches" (가슴 아프게)
1969	Lee Mi-ja	"Woman's Life" (여자의 일생)
1970	Choi Hee-joon	
1970	Lee Mi-ja	"Woman's Life" (여자의 일생)
1971	Nam Jin	"Should Have a Beautiful Heart" (마음이 고와야지)
1971	Kim Sang-hee	
1972	Na Hoon-a	
1972	Ha Chun-hwa	
1973	Nam Jin	"Don't Change, My Dear" (그대여 변치마오)
1973	Ha Chun-hwa	"Yeongam Arirang" (영암 아리랑)
1974	Kim Se-hwan	"Old Friend" (옛 친구)
1974	Ha Chun-hwa	"The First Time in My Life" (난생처음)
1975	Kim Se-hwan	"Loving Heart" (사랑하는 마음)
1975	Lee Su-mi	"Stand By Me" (내 곁이 있어주)
1976	Kim Hoon	나를 두고 아리랑
1976	Ha Chun-hwa	"Daekwanryeong Arirang" (대관령 아리랑)
1977	Kim Hoon	
1977	Hye Eun-yi	"I Love Only You" (당신만을 사랑해)
1978	Choi Heon	"Empress Tree Leaves" (오동잎)
1978	Lee Eun-ha	"Night Train" (밤차)
1979	Jo Kyung-soo	"What Happiness Is" (행복이란)
1979	Lee Eun-ha	"Confusing" (아리송해)
1980	Cho Yong-pil	"Woman Outside the Window" (창밖의 여자)
1980	Yoon Si-nae	"Passionate Love" (열애)

=== KBS Music Awards (1981–2005) ===
Year	Artist	Song
1981	Cho Yong-pil	"Red Dragonfly" (고추잠자리)
1981	Lee Jeong-hui	"You" (그대여)
1982	Cho Yong-pil	"Tragic Love" (비련)
1982	Yun Si-nae	"To The DJ" (DJ에게)
1983	Cho Yong-pil	"Dear Friend" (친구여)
1983	Yun Si-nae	"Let's Study" (공부합시다)
1984	Kim Soo-chul	"Forgotten Flower" (못다핀 꽃 한송이)
1984	Lee Eun-ha	"One Who's Never Been in Love" (사랑 한번 못해본 사람은)
1985	Cho Yong-pil	"Yesterday, Today, And..." (어제, 오늘 그리고)
1985	Jeong Soo-ra	"City Streets" (도시의 거리)
1986	Jeon Young-rok	"Crybaby, My Love" (내 사랑 울보)
1986	Jeong Soo-ra	"From Me to You" (난 너에게)
1987	Jeon Young-rok	"White Night" (하얀 밤에)
1988	Joo Hyun-mi	"That Person in Shinsadong" (신사동 그 사람)
1989	Hyun Cheul	"Garden Balsam Feelings" (봉선화 연정)
1990	Hyun Cheul	"Not Anymore" (싫다 싫어)
1991	Kim Jeong-soo	"You" (당신)
1992	Shin Seung-hun	"Invisible Love"
1993	Kim Soo-hee	"Sad Love" (애모)
1994	Kim Gun-mo	"Excuse"
1995	Kim Gun-mo	"Wrongful Meeting" (잘못된 만남)
1996	Kim Gun-mo	"Speed"
1997	Im Chang-jung	"Again"
1998	H.O.T.	"Hope"
1999	Jo Sung-mo	"For Your Soul"
2000	G.o.d	"Lies"
2001	G.o.d	"Road"
2002	Jang Na-ra	"Sweet Dream"
2003	Lee Hyori	"10 Minutes"
2004	Rain	"It's Raining"
2005	Kim Jong-kook	"Lovable"

=== KBS Song Festival (Popular Song of the Year) ===
Year	Artist	Song
2009	2PM	"Again & Again"
2010	Girls' Generation	"Oh!"
2011	Beast	"Fiction"
2012	Psy	"Gangnam Style" (강남 스타일)
2013	Exo	"Growl" (으르렁)

== Performers ==
=== KBS Song Festival (2006–present) ===
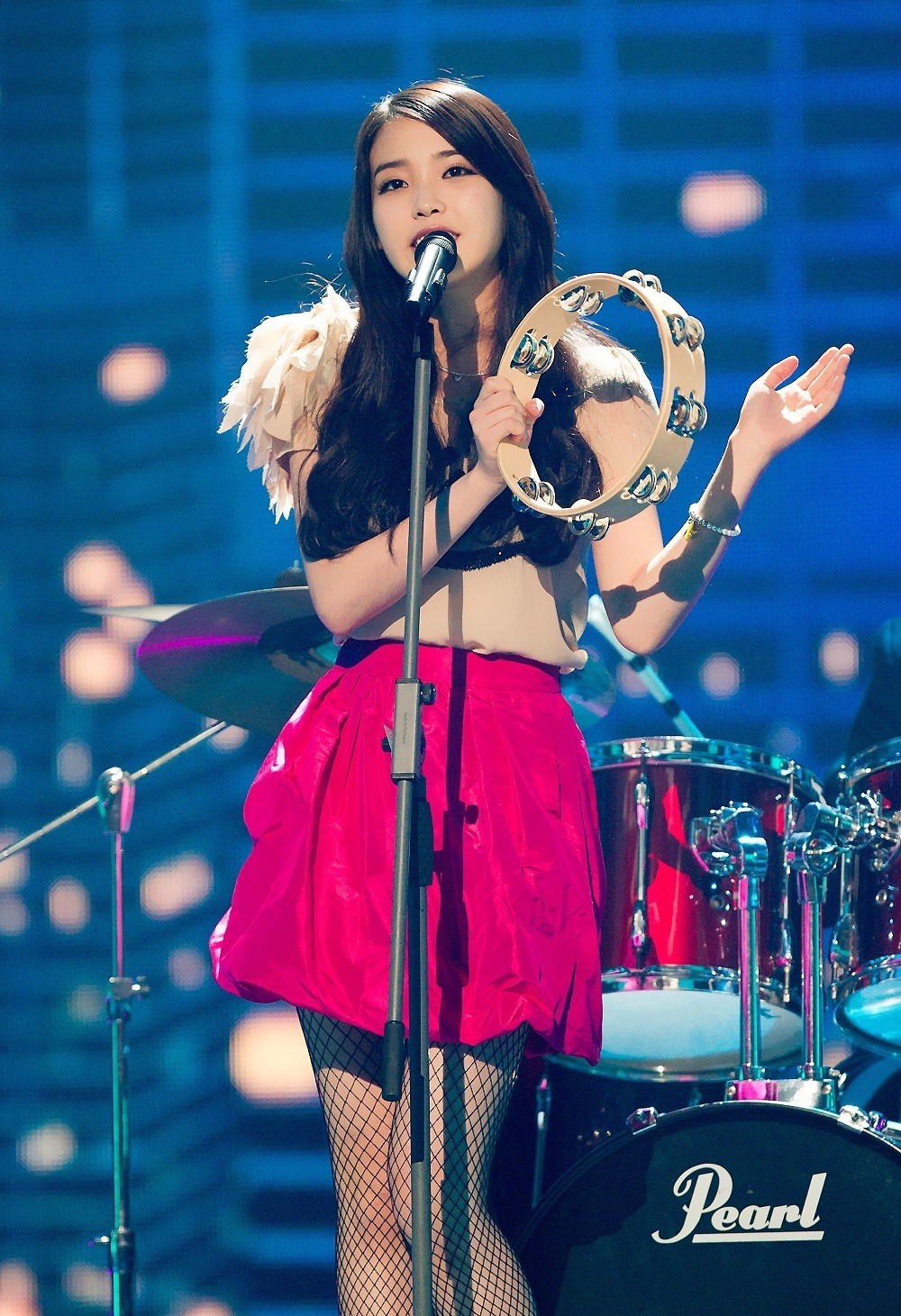
IU at the 2011 KBS Song Festival.

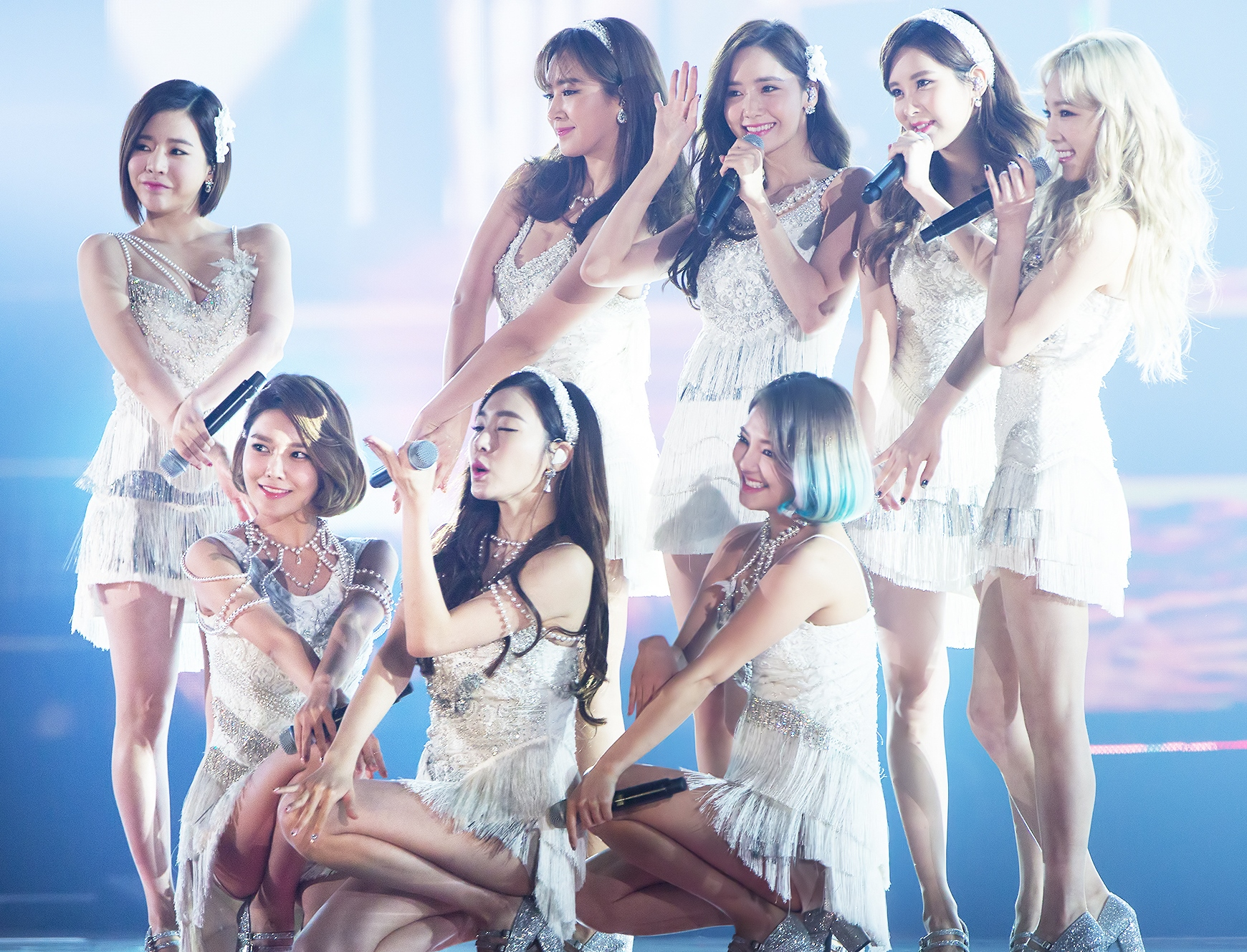
Girls' Generation at the 2015 KBS Song Festival.

Year	Artists	Ref
2011	2PM, 4Minute, Beast, BigBang, Clover, CNBLUE, Davichi, F(x), Girls' Generation, Infinite, IU, Kim Hyun-joong, Lee Seung-gi, MBLAQ, Miss A, Secret, Sistar, Super Junior, T-ara, TVXQ, U-KISS, Wonder Girls	
2012	2PM, Ailee, B1A4, Beast, BigBang, CNBLUE, Dynamic Duo, Infinite, K.Will, Kara, Miss A, Secret, Sistar, Shinee, Super Junior, T-ara, Teen Top, TVXQ, Lee Hyori	
2013	Girls' Generation, Shinee, EXO, IU, Infinite, B2ST, 2PM, Miss A, 4 Minute, Kara, Sistar, K.Will, Teen Top, Boyfriend, Girl's Day, A Pink, Ailee, Lee Seung Chol, Yoo Hee Yeol, Secret, Dynamic Duo, Huh Gak, Crayon Pop	
2014	2PM, Ailee, AOA, Apink, B1A4, Beast, Block B, BTS, CNBlue, EXO, Fly to the Sky, Girl's Day, Girls' Generation, Im Chang-jung, Infinite, San E & Raina, Secret, Sistar, Soyou & Junggigo, VIXX	
2015	Group 1: Ailee, AOA, Apink, B1A4, BtoB, BTS, CNBLUE, EXID, EXO, GFriend, Girls' Generation, Got7, Infinite, Mamamoo, Noel, Red Velvet, Shinee, VIXX; Group 2: Hong Kyung-min, Moon Myung Jin, Hwang Chi-yeul, Ali, Son Seung-yeon; Group 3: Crush, Dynamic Duo, Zion.T; Group 4: Kim Chang-wan Band	
2016	Group 1: AOA, B.A.P, BtoB, BTS, CNBLUE, EXID, EXO, GFriend, Got7, Han Dong-geun, I.O.I, Infinite, Jung Eun-ji, Mamamoo, Monsta X, Red Velvet, Seventeen, Shinee, Taeyeon, Twice, VIXX; Group 2: Davichi, Uhm Jung-hwa, Hwang Chi-yeul, Jeon In Kwon, Shinhwa; Group 3: Astro, Cosmic Girls, Laboum, NCT Dream, Oh My Girl, UP10TION	
2017	BTS, EXO, GFriend, Hwang Chi-yeul, Hyuna, Mamamoo, Red Velvet, Seventeen, Twice, Wanna One, contestants from The Unit	
2018	10cm, Apink, AOA, BTOB, BTS, Celeb Five, Chungha, Cosmic Girls, Day6, EXO, GFRIEND, (G)I-DLE, Got7, Hwang Chi Yeol, Kim Yeon-ja, Lovelyz, Momoland, Monsta X, NCT, Norazo, NU'EST W, Oh My Girl, Red Velvet, Roy Kim, SEVENTEEN, Stray Kids, Sunmi, The Boyz, Twice, VIXX, Wanna One, Yong Jun-hyung, Kim Hyo-yeon	
2019	Apink, Astro, BTS, Chungha, Cosmic Girls, Everglow, GFriend, Golden Child, Got7, Itzy, Mamamoo, Monsta X, N.Flying, NCT 127, NCT Dream, NU'EST, Oh My Girl, Red Velvet, SEVENTEEN, Song Ga-in, Stray Kids, The Boyz, Twice, TXT	
2020	BTS, Taemin, Twice, Got7, Mamamoo, Monsta X, Park Jin-young, Sunmi, NCT, NU'EST, Oh My Girl, Paul Kim, GFriend, Astro, Stray Kids, (G)I-dle, Kim Yeon-ja, Sul Woon-do, Jessi, Iz*One, The Boyz, Momoland, TXT, Itzy, Aespa, Enhypen	
2021	Red Velvet, Oh My Girl, Kang Daniel, The Boyz, Stray Kids, Itzy, Tomorrow X Together, Enhypen, Aespa, Lee Mu-jin, Seventeen, Sunmi, NU'EST, Astro, Brave Girls, NCT U, SF9, Kim Woo-seok, STAYC, Ive	
2022	Koyote, BoA, Kim Woo-seok, NCT 127, NCT Dream, Pentagon, The Boyz, Fromis 9, Forestella, Stray Kids, (G)I-dle, Ateez, Choi Ye-na, Oneus, Itzy, Tomorrow X Together, STAYC, Aespa, Enhypen, Ive, Kep1er, Nmixx, Le Sserafim, NewJeans	
2023	Part 1: Sunmi, Hwasa, Young K, NCT 127, NCT Dream, Fromis 9, (G)I-dle, Oneus, Tomorrow X Together, Cravity, Aespa, Ive, Xdinary Heroes, H1-Key, Xikers, Zerobaseone, Riize, Fantasy Boys; Part 2: Golden Girls, Park Jin-young, Shinee, MeloMance, Kang Daniel, The Boyz, Stray Kids, Ateez, Itzy, Lee Young-ji, P1Harmony, STAYC, Enhypen, NiziU, Kep1er, Nmixx, Le Sserafim, NewJeans, &Team, BoyNextDoor	
2024	Japan: Stray Kids, Ateez, WayV, Itzy, Tomorrow X Together, STAYC, INI, Trendz, H1-Key, Nmixx, Le Sserafim, NewJeans, Xikers, Zerobaseone, N.SSign, Riize, Evnne, TWS, NCT Wish, Illit, Nexz, Nouera; Korea: Yoon Soo-il, DJ Koo, Jinusean, Baby Vox, Bada, Young Tak, Jang Minho, NCT 127, NCT Dream, (G)I-dle, Oneus, Lee Young-ji, Lee Chan-won, Cravity, P1Harmony, Aespa, Enhypen, Ive, Kep1er, TripleS, BoyNextDoor, Kiss of Life, Unis	
2025	CNBLUE, 10cm, Roy Kim, Park Seo-jin, Jannabi, Lovelyz, Dayoung (WJSN), NCT Dream, The Boyz, Fromis 9, Lee Chan-won, P1Harmony, STAYC, Aespa, Le Sserafim, TripleS, Kiss of Life, N.SSign, Evnne, Close Your Eyes, Hitgs, Baby Don't Cry, AHOF	
2026	Kim Jae-joong, CL, Mamamoo, Soyeon (I-dle), Tomorrow X Together, Nmixx, A2O May, A2O Lite, A2O Soul	

== See also ==
- SBS Gayo Daejeon
- MBC Gayo Daejejeon
