= List of songs recorded by Tomorrow X Together =

Songs recorded by Tomorrow X Together

The following is a list of songs recorded by South Korean boy band Tomorrow X Together.

Key
| | Indicates a single/OST release |
| † | Song available in Japanese |
| ‡ | Song available in Korean and Japanese |

== Recorded songs ==
List of songs, showing year released, writers name, and originating album
| Song | Year | Writer(s) | Album | Ref. |
|---|---|---|---|---|
| "0X1=Lovesong (I Know I Love You)" (featuring Seori) (Note: "0X1=Lovesong (I Know I Love You)" (featuring Seori) (Emocore Mix) was released as part of The Chaos Chapter: Fight or Escape on August 17, 2021.) (Note: The Japanese version of "0X1=Lovesong (I Know I Love You)" (featuring Lilas Ikuta) was released as part of Chaotic Wonderland on November 10, 2021.) | 2021 | Slow Rabbit; RM; Derek "Mod Sun" Smith; Andrew Migliore; Melanie Joy Fontana; Bang; Danke; Will Simms; Gabriel Brandes; Matt Thomson; Max Lynedoch Graham | The Chaos Chapter: Freeze | |
| "0X1=Lovesong (I Know I Love You)" (featuring Seori) | 2021 | Slow Rabbit; RM; Derek "Mod Sun" Smith; Andrew Migliore; Melanie Joy Fontana; Bang; Danke; Will Simms; Gabriel Brandes; Matt Thomson; Max Lynedoch Graham | The Chaos Chapter: Fight or Escape | |
| "9 and Three Quarters (Run Away)" ‡ (9와 4분의 3 승강장에서 너를 기다려) (Note: Gu-wa sa-bun-ui sam seunggangjang-eseo neoreul gidaryeo lit. "Waiting for you at Platform 9 3/4". The Japanese version was released as part of Still Dreaming on January 20, 2021.) | 2019 | "hitman" bang Supreme Boi; Slow Rabbit; Melanie Joy Fontana; Michel 'Lindgren' Schulz; Andreas Carlsson; Pauline Skött; Peter St. James | The Dream Chapter: Magic | |
| "20cm" | 2019 | "hitman" bang Supreme Boi; Jordan Kyle; Hyuk Shin; Jayrah Gibson danke Adora; Hiss noise Bobby Chung; Joni | The Dream Chapter: Magic | |
| "Angel or Devil" (Note: The Japanese version was released as part of Still Dreaming on January 20, 2021.) ‡ | 2019 | "hitman" bang Supreme Boi; Pdogg; Slow Rabbit; Melanie Joy Fontana; Michel 'Lindgren' Schulz; Peter Ibsen; Naitumela Masuku | The Dream Chapter: Magic | |
| "Anti-Romantic" | 2021 | Alex Hope; Salem Ilese; Slow Rabbit "Hitman" Bang; Danke; Song Jae-kyung | The Chaos Chapter: Freeze | |
| "Anti-Romantic" | 2021 | Alex Hope; Salem Ilese; Slow Rabbit "Hitman" Bang; Danke; Song Jae-kyung | The Chaos Chapter: Fight or Escape | |
| "Blue Hour" ‡ (5시 53분의 하늘에서 발견한 너와 나) | 2020 | Slow Rabbit; Kyler Niko; Lil 27 Club "hitman" bang | Minisode1: Blue Hour | |
| "Blue Orangeade" | 2019 | Slow Rabbit; Moonshine; Cazzi Opeia; Ellen Berg; Supreme Boi | The Dream Chapter: Star | |
| "Can't We Just Leave the Monster Alive?" (그냥 괴물을 살려두면 안 되는 걸까) | 2019 | "hitman" bang Wonderkid; Shinkung; Melanie Joy Fontana; Michel 'Lindgren' Schulz; Adora; Joni; Jung Su-kyung | The Dream Chapter: Magic | |
| "Can't You See Me?" ‡ (세계가 불타버린 밤, 우린…) | 2020 | Slow Rabbit "Hitman" Bang; Supreme Boi; Melanie Joy Fontana; Michel "Lindgren" Schulz; Eric Zayne; Naz Tokoi | The Dream Chapter: Eternity | |
| "Cat & Dog" | 2019 | Daniel "JUNE NAWAKII" Celestin; Supreme Boi; Darel "BEBE DA RICH" Ituta | The Dream Chapter: Star | |
| "Crown" ‡ | 2019 | Slow Rabbit; Melanie Joy Fontana; Michel "Lindgren" Schulz; Supreme Boi "hitman" bang Mayu Wakisaka | The Dream Chapter: Star | |
| "Dear Sputnik" (디어 스푸트니크) | 2021 | El Capitxn; Hueningkai; Bang; Andy Love; Danke; Brandes; Thomson; Graham; Ronnie Icon; Taehyun; Kim Seon-oh; 1월8일; Kim Bo-eun; Song Jae-kyung | The Chaos Chapter: Freeze | |
| "Dear Sputnik" (디어 스푸트니크) | 2021 | El Capitxn; Hueningkai; Bang; Andy Love; Danke; Brandes; Thomson; Graham; Ronnie Icon; Taehyun; Kim Seon-oh; 1월8일; Kim Bo-eun; Song Jae-kyung | The Chaos Chapter: Fight or Escape | |
| "Drama" ‡ | 2020 | Supreme Boi; Jake Torry; Noah Conrad; Roland "Rollo" Spreckley; El Capitxn | The Dream Chapter: Eternity | |
| "Eternally" | 2020 | Frants; Supreme Boi; Slow Rabbit; Pauline Skott; Peter St James; Alina Paulsen; Chris Brenner "Hitman" Bang danke | The Dream Chapter: Eternity | |
| "Everlasting Shine" † | 2021 | Yohei; Uta | Still Dreaming | |
| "Eyes" (감은 눈을 떠봐) | 2021 | Hezen (MUSIC CUBE); Hae Sol Hae; Albin Nordqvist | Non-album single | |
| "Fairy of Shampoo" (Note: "Fairy of Shampoo" is a remake of the song by Light & Salt.) (샴푸의 요정) | 2020 | El Capitxn; Slow Rabbit; Keeho Chang; Yeonjun | The Dream Chapter: Eternity | |
| "Force" † | 2021 | Motoki Ohmori | Still Dreaming | |
| "Free Falling" | 2022 | "Hitman" Bang; 8PEX Company; Aaron Kim; Danke; Isaac Han; Jay & Rudy; Saimon | Non-album single | |
| "Frost" | 2021 | Ashton Casey; Gina Kushka; Jacob Manson; Yeonjun; Jo; Bang; Kim Bo-eun; Danke; Hwang In-chan | The Chaos Chapter: Freeze | |
| "Frost" | 2021 | Ashton Casey; Gina Kushka; Jacob Manson; Yeonjun; Jo; Bang; Kim Bo-eun; Danke; Hwang In-chan | The Chaos Chapter: Fight or Escape | |
| "Ghosting" | 2020 | Jeongmi Kim; Jieun Jeon; Hueningkai; Kyler Niko; Lennon Stella; Ru Uth; Sueran Lee; Sonjong Hwang; Soobin; Submin Kim; Taehyun; Wuhyun Park; El Capitxn | Minisode1: Blue Hour | |
| "Good Boy Gone Bad" (Note: The Japanese version was released as part of Good Boy Gone Bad on August 31, 2022.) ‡ | 2022 | Slow Rabbit; Supreme Boi; Moa "Cazzi Opeia" Carlebecker; Ellen Berg; Big Hit Music; Melanie Joy Fontana; Michel "Lindgren" Schulz "Hitman" Bang; Yeonjun; Blvsh; Chris James; Jo Yoon-kyung | Minisode 2: Thursday's Child | |
| "Hitori no Yoru" † | 2022 | El Capitxn; Slow Rabbit; Takaya Kawasaki | Good Boy Gone Bad | |
| "Ice Cream" (소악행) (Note: Soakaeng lit. "Small evil deeds") | 2021 | Jacob Attwooll; Tristan Landymore; Frederick Cox; Conrad Sewell; Danke; Bang; Lee Seu-ran; Stella Jang; Soobin; Jo Yoon-kyung | The Chaos Chapter: Freeze | |
| "Ice Cream" (소악행) | 2021 | Jacob Attwooll; Tristan Landymore; Frederick Cox; Conrad Sewell; Danke; Bang; Lee Seu-ran; Stella Jang; Soobin; Jo Yoon-kyung | The Chaos Chapter: Fight or Escape | |
| "Intro: Dreaming" † | 2021 | Revin; Slow Rabbit | Still Dreaming | |
| "Ito" † | 2021 | Greeeen | Chaotic Wonderland | |
| "LO$ER=LO♡ER" | 2021 | Slow Rabbit; Bang; Andy Love; Lil 27 Club; Billy Walsh; Louis Bell; Daniel Caesar; Oneye; Yeonjun; Moa "Cazzi Opeia" Carlebecker; Alex Karlsson; Ronnie Icon; Hwang In-chan; Jung Jin-woo | The Chaos Chapter: Fight or Escape | |
| "Lonely Boy" (네 번째 손가락 위타투) (Note: Ne Bonjjae Songarak Witatu lit. "The Tattoo on My Ring Finger") (sung by Yeonjun and Hueningkai)) | 2022 | Jason Hahns; Andrew Okamura; Yeonjun; El Capitxn; Hueningkai | Minisode 2: Thursday's Child | |
| "Love Sight" (널 보면 시간이 멈춰 어느 순간에도) | 2021 | AVGS; Jymon | Doom at Your Service OST Part 2 | |
| "Magic Island" | 2019 | "hitman" bang Supreme Boi; Slow Rabbit; Peter Thomas; Jake Torrey; Song Jae-kyung; Joni; GHSTLOOP | The Dream Chapter: Magic | |
| "Magic" | 2021 | Olly Murs; Sarah Blanchard; Richard Boardman; Pablo Bowman; Anders Froen; Aaron Hibell | The Chaos Chapter: Freeze | |
| "Magic" | 2021 | Olly Murs; Sarah Blanchard; Richard Boardman; Pablo Bowman; Anders Froen; Aaron Hibell | The Chaos Chapter: Fight or Escape | |
| "Magic" | 2021 | Olly Murs; Sarah Blanchard; Richard Boardman; Pablo Bowman; Anders Froen; Aaron Hibell | Chaotic Wonderland | |
| "Maze in the Mirror" (거울 속의 미로) | 2020 | Slow Rabbit; Yeonjun; Beomgyu; Adora; Hueningkai; Soobin; Taehyun | The Dream Chapter: Eternity | |
| "MOA Diary (Dubaddu Wari Wari)" (Note: The Japanese version was released as part of Chaotic Wonderland on November 10, 2021.) ‡ | 2021 | Thomson; Graham; Brandes; Karlsson; Taehyun; Big Hit Music; James F Reynolds; Beomgyu; Soobin; Yeonjun; Hueningkai | The Chaos Chapter: Fight or Escape | |
| "Nap of a Star" | 2019 | LEL"hitman" bang Slow Rabbit | The Dream Chapter: Star | |
| "New Rules" | 2019 | Supreme Boi; EL CAPITXN; Daniel Caesar; Ludwig Lindell; Jordan “DJ Swivel” Young; Candace Nicole Sosa; Max Lynedoch Graham; Matt Thomson; Wilhelm Börjesson danke | The Dream Chapter: Magic | |
| "No Rules" | 2021 | Gavin Jones; Olof Lindskog; Ryan Lawrie; Lee Seu-ran; Yeonjun; Danke; Hueningkai; Beomgyu; Bang; Taehyun; Jo; 1월8일} | The Chaos Chapter: Freeze | |
| "No Rules" | 2021 | Gavin Jones; Olof Lindskog; Ryan Lawrie; Lee Seu-ran; Yeonjun; Danke; Hueningkai; Beomgyu; Bang; Taehyun; Jo; 1월8일} | The Chaos Chapter: Fight or Escape | |
| "Opening Sequence" | 2022 | Koda; Sam Klempner; Bryn Christopher; Supreme Boi; Slow Rabbit; Lee Seu-ran; Hueningkai; January 8 Taehyun; Danke; Yi Yi-jin | Minisode 2: Thursday's Child | |
| "Our Summer" | 2019 | The Futuristics; Delacey; Jesse St John; Shae Jacobs "hitman" bang Adora | The Dream Chapter: Star | |
| "Outro: Still" † | 2021 | El Capitxn; Summergal | Still Dreaming | |
| "Poppin' Star" | 2019 | "hitman" bang Shae Jacobs; Lauren Amber Aquilina; Adora; Jung Su-kyung; Song Jae-kyung | The Dream Chapter: Magic | |
| "PS5" (Salem Ilese with Tomorrow X Together featuring Alan Walker) | 2022 | Alan Walker; Carl Hovind; Chloe Copoloff; Fredrik Borch Olsen; Gunnar Greve; Jon Sprott; Marcus Arnbekk; Marty Rod; Øyvind Sauvik; Marty Maro | Unsponsored Content | |
| "Puma" (동물원을 빠져나온 퓨마) (Note: Dongmurwon-eul ppajyeonaon pyuma lit. "Puma fleeing the zoo") | 2020 | Supreme Boi; Melanie Joy Fontana; Michel "Lindgren" Schulz; Slow Rabbit; Krysta Youngs; Julia Ross | The Dream Chapter: Eternity | |
| "Ring" (君じゃない誰かの愛し方) | 2022 | Adora; Hueningkai; Junji Ishiwatari; Slow Rabbit; Taehyun; Yeonjun | Good Boy Gone Bad | |
| "Roller Coaster" (간지러워) (Note: Ganjireowo lit. "Itchy") | 2019 | "hitman" bang Supreme Boi; Sam Klempner; Jacob Attwooll; Slow Rabbit; Adora; Hueningkai; EL CAPITXN; Bobby Chung | The Dream Chapter: Magic | |
| "Thursday's Child Has Far to Go" (sung by Soobin, Beomgyu, and Taehyun) | 2022 | Slow Rabbit; Beomgyu; Revin; Jo; Gabriel Brandes; Matt Thomson; Max Lynedoch Graham; Taehyun "Hitman" Bang; Song Jae-kyung; January 8 Carlebecker; Ninos Hanna; Fontana; Schulz; Alexander Karlsson; Nermin Harambašić; Danke; Hwang | Minisode 2: Thursday's Child | |
| "Trust Fund Baby" | 2022 | Cate Downey; Big Hit Music; Slow Rabbit; Danke; Brian Phillips; Taehyun; Yi; Yeonjun; Hwang Yu-bin; Kim In-hyung | Minisode 2: Thursday's Child | |
| "Valley of Lies" (featuring Iann Dior) | 2022 | Andrew Luce; Michael Olmo; Ryan Cantu; Slow Rabbit; Yeonjun | Non-album single | |
| "Way Home" (하굣길) | 2020 | Daewook Chung; Heejoo Lee; Hyojung Shin; Hueningkai; Melanie Joy Fontana; Micheal "Lindgren" Schulz "Hitman" Bang; Sofia Kay; Adora; Subin Kim; Sunjae Oh; Taehyun; Wonderkid; Wuhyun Park; Yeonjun; Wonderkid; Shinkung | Minisode1: Blue Hour | |
| "We Lost the Summer" (날씨를 잃어버렸어) | 2020 | Charli XCX; Charlotte Grace Victoria Lee; Colton Ward; Slow Rabbit; Pdogg; Kyle Bladt Knudsen; Lil 27 Club | Minisode1: Blue Hour | |
| "What If I Had Been That Puma" (밸런스 게임) (Note: Baelronseu geim lit. "Balance game") | 2021 | Ebenezer; Magnus; Yeonjun; Danke; Bang; Taehyun; Cho; Beomgyu; 1월8일; Lutra; Kim In-hyung | The Chaos Chapter: Freeze | |
| "What If I Had Been That Puma" (밸런스 게임) | 2021 | Ebenezer; Magnus; Yeonjun; Danke; Bang; Taehyun; Cho; Beomgyu; 1월8일; Lutra; Kim In-hyung | The Chaos Chapter: Fight or Escape | |
| "Wishlist" | 2020 | Boeun Kim; Cazzi Opeia; Slow Rabbit; Ellen Berg; Heejoo Lee; Hueningkai; Melanie Joy Fontana; Micheal "Lindgren" Schulz; Minyoung Yoon; Sam Klempner; Sueran Lee "Hitman" Bang; Taehyun; Wuhyun Park; Yeonjun; Yunkyoung Cho | Minisode1: Blue Hour | |
| "Your Light" (Note: The Japanese version was released as part of Live On: Original Soundtrack on November 24, 2020.) | 2020 | Kim Ho-kyung; 1601; Revin | Live On OST Part 1 | |
