= List of Oricon number-one albums of 2021 =

The following is a list of Oricon number-one albums of 2021, which uses data from combined (physical, digital, and streaming) and physical sales.

== Chart history ==
=== Combined sales ===
| Issue date | Album | Artist(s) | Ref. |
|---|---|---|---|
| January 4 | O Album | KinKi Kids | |
| January 11 | This Is Arashi | Arashi | |
| January 18 | 1ST | SixTones | |
| January 25 | Straight Outta Rhyme Anima | Hypnosis Mic: Division Rap Battle | |
| February 1 | Still Dreaming | Tomorrow X Together | |
| February 8 | Aster | Colon | |
| February 15 | Live Loud | The Yellow Monkey | |
| February 22 | Sekai no Owari 2010–2019 | Sekai no Owari | |
| March 1 | Loveholic | NCT 127 | |
| March 8 | Hypnosis Mic: Division Rap Battle – 2nd D.R.B: Dotsuitare Hompo vs Buster Bros!!! | Hypnosis Mic: Division Rap Battle | |
| March 15 | SZ10th | Sexy Zone | |
| March 22 | One Last Kiss | Hikaru Utada | |
| March 29 | Rainbow | Johnny's West | |
| April 5 | Hypnosis Mic: Division Rap Battle – 2nd D.R.B: Fling Posse vs Mad Trigger Crew | Hypnosis Mic: Division Rap Battle | |
| April 12 | The First Step: Treasure Effect | Treasure | |
| April 19 | Chōtokkyū ≠Me Iki | ≠Me | |
| April 26 | Walpurgis | Aimer | |
| May 3 | Be | BTS | |
| May 10 | Border: Carnival | Enhypen | |
| May 17 | Border: Carnival | Enhypen | |
| May 24 | Zenbu, Naisho. | =Love | |
| May 31 | Hot Sauce | NCT Dream | |
| June 7 | Demon Slayer: Kimetsu no Yaiba – Tanjiro Kamado Risshi-hen Original Soundtrack | Various artists | |
| June 14 | Playful | Koichi Domoto | |
| June 21 | The Chaos Chapter: Freeze | Tomorrow X Together | |
| June 28 | BTS, the Best | BTS | |
| July 5 | BTS, the Best | BTS | |
| July 12 | BTS, the Best | BTS | |
| July 19 | L∞ve | Urashimasakatasen | |
| July 26 | Butter | BTS | |
| August 2 | Re:Sense | King & Prince | |
| August 9 | Superstar | Shinee | |
| August 16 | Going to Destruction | Bish | |
| August 23 | Best of Kis-My-Ft2 | Kis-My-Ft2 | |
| August 30 | Editorial | Official Hige Dandism | |
| September 6 | Go to Funk | Endrecheri | |
| September 13 | Step | V6 | |
| September 20 | Hypnosis Mic: Division Rap Battle – 2nd D.R.B: Buster Bros!!! VS Matenro VS Fling Posse | Hypnosis Mic: Division Rap Battle | |
| September 27 | Gohan Misoshiru Nori Otsukemono Tamagoyaki feat. Umeboshi | Keisuke Kuwata | |
| October 4 | Sticker | NCT 127 | |
| October 11 | Snow Mania S1 | Snow Man | |
| October 18 | Freedom Only | Glay | |
| October 25 | Dimension: Dilemma | Enhypen | |
| November 1 | Attacca | Seventeen | |
| November 8 | Very6 Best | V6 | |
| November 15 | Attacca | Seventeen | |
| November 22 | Chaotic Wonderland | Tomorrow X Together | |
| November 29 | 8beat | Kanjani Eight | |
| December 6 | U | NiziU | |
| December 13 | Outstanding | HKT48 | |
| December 20 | Friends III | B'z | |
| December 27 | Time Flies | Nogizaka46 | |

=== Physical sales ===
| Issue date | Album | Artist(s) | Ref. |
|---|---|---|---|
| January 4 | O Album | KinKi Kids | |
| January 11 | This Is Arashi | Arashi | |
| January 18 | 1ST | SixTones | |
| January 25 | Straight Outta Rhyme Anima | Hypnosis Mic: Division Rap Battle | |
| February 1 | Still Dreaming | Tomorrow X Together | |
| February 8 | Aster | Colon | |
| February 15 | Live Loud | The Yellow Monkey | |
| February 22 | Sekai no Owari 2010–2019 | Sekai no Owari | |
| March 1 | Loveholic | NCT 127 | |
| March 8 | Hypnosis Mic: Division Rap Battle – 2nd D.R.B: Dotsuitare Hompo vs Buster Bros!!! | Hypnosis Mic: Division Rap Battle | |
| March 15 | SZ10th | Sexy Zone | |
| March 22 | Hypnosis Mic: Division Rap Battle – 2nd D.R.B: Bad Ass Temple vs Matenro | Hypnosis Mic: Division Rap Battle | |
| March 29 | Rainbow | Johnny's West | |
| April 5 | Hypnosis Mic: Division Rap Battle – 2nd D.R.B: Fling Posse vs Mad Trigger Crew | Hypnosis Mic: Division Rap Battle | |
| April 12 | The First Step: Treasure Effect | Treasure | |
| April 19 | Chōtokkyū ≠Me Iki | ≠Me | |
| April 26 | All Yours | Astro | |
| May 3 | Be | BTS | |
| May 10 | Border: Carnival | Enhypen | |
| May 17 | Border: Carnival | Enhypen | |
| May 24 | Zenbu, Naisho. | =Love | |
| May 31 | Hot Sauce | NCT Dream | |
| June 7 | Demon Slayer: Kimetsu no Yaiba – Tanjiro Kamado Risshi-hen Original Soundtrack | Various artists | |
| June 14 | Playful | Koichi Domoto | |
| June 21 | The Chaos Chapter: Freeze | Tomorrow X Together | |
| June 28 | BTS, the Best | BTS | |
| July 5 | BTS, the Best | BTS | |
| July 12 | BTS, the Best | BTS | |
| July 19 | L∞ve | Urashimasakatasen | |
| July 26 | Butter | BTS | |
| August 2 | Re:Sense | King & Prince | |
| August 9 | Superstar | Shinee | |
| August 16 | Going to Destruction | Bish | |
| August 23 | Best of Kis-My-Ft2 | Kis-My-Ft2 | |
| August 30 | Editorial | Official Hige Dandism | |
| September 6 | Go to Funk | Endrecheri | |
| September 13 | Step | V6 | |
| September 20 | Hypnosis Mic: Division Rap Battle – 2nd D.R.B: Buster Bros!!! VS Matenro VS Fling Posse | Hypnosis Mic: Division Rap Battle | |
| September 27 | Gohan Misoshiru Nori Otsukemono Tamagoyaki feat. Umeboshi | Keisuke Kuwata | |
| October 4 | Sticker | NCT 127 | |
| October 11 | Snow Mania S1 | Snow Man | |
| October 18 | Freedom Only | Glay | |
| October 25 | Dimension: Dilemma | Enhypen | |
| November 1 | Attacca | Seventeen | |
| November 8 | Very6 Best | V6 | |
| November 15 | Attacca | Seventeen | |
| November 22 | Chaotic Wonderland | Tomorrow X Together | |
| November 29 | 8beat | Kanjani Eight | |
| December 6 | U | NiziU | |
| December 13 | Outstanding | HKT48 | |
| December 20 | Friends III | B'z | |
| December 27 | Time Flies | Nogizaka46 | |

== See also ==
- List of Oricon number-one singles of 2021
