= Sweet (Tomorrow X Together album) =

- Digital cover

Studio album by Tomorrow X Together
- Released: July 5, 2023
- Length: 37:56
- Languages: Japanese; English
- Labels: BigHit; Universal Japan

Tomorrow X Together chronology
The Name Chapter: Temptation (2023)	Sweet (2023)	The Name Chapter: Freefall (2023)

Tomorrow X Together Japanese chronology
Chaotic Wonderland (2021)	Sweet (2023)	Starkissed (2025)

Singles from Sweet
- 1. "Sugar Rush Ride (Japanese ver.)" Released: June 28, 2023; 2. "Hydrangea Love" Released: June 30, 2023

Sweet (stylized in all caps) is the second Japanese-language studio album (fourth overall) by South Korean boy band Tomorrow X Together. It was released by BigHit Entertainment and Universal Music Japan on July 5, 2023. Partially acting as a compilation of tracks from the band's 2021 EP Chaotic Wonderland and subsequent standalone singles, the album contains twelve tracks, including four new original songs. Sweet was supported by the singles "Sugar Rush Ride" (Japanese ver.) and "Hydrangea Love". The album was commercially successful, debuting at number-one on Japan's Oricon Albums Chart and has been certified 2× Platinum by the RIAJ.

== Background and release ==
After the release of Tomorrow X Together's first Japanese-language album Still Dreaming (2021), the band supplemented their Japanese discography with extended plays and singles containing Japanese versions of their previously released Korean songs. Chaotic Wonderland was released in late 2021 and included Japanese versions of "0X1=Lovesong (I Know I Love You)" and "MOA Diary (Dubaddu Wari Wari)", as well as a new song "Ito", and previously released English song "Magic", followed in 2022 by the Japanese version of "Good Boy Gone Bad", which contained two original songs as B-sides ("Ring" and "Hitori no Yoru").

Sweet, Tomorrow X Together's second Japanese album, was announced by BigHit Music on April 28, 2023. The announcement indicated that the album would be released on July 5, and that it would contain twelve tracks including four new original Japanese songs, tracks previously included on the band's earlier Japanese releases, as well as a Japanese version of the band's Korean-language song "Sugar Rush Ride".

"Sugar Rush Ride" was released as the album's lead single on June 28, with a music video being released simultaneously with the track. A second single, "Hydrangea Love" was released on June 30. Sweet was officially released on July 5, 2023.

== Composition ==
Sweet contains twelve tracks and is bookended by an intro, "Floating", and outro, "Falling". "Hydrangea Love" is a ballad about "how the days spent with 'you' accumulate to become a better 'me'" The next track, Sugar Rush Ride, is a "saccharine" dance-pop song with "instantly catchy" guitar riffs and a whistle riff repeated throughout, cowritten by American songwriter Salem Ilese. "0X1=Lovesong (I Know I Love You)" is an emo rock influenced song co-written by BTS's RM, which is followed by "Ito", a ballad that deals with the theme of fate. "Ring" is a pop rock song and is the first Japanese-language self-composed song by the band, with Yeonjun, Taehyun and Hueningkai. "Magic", Tomorrow X Together's first single entirely in English, is a disco pop track with "breathy falsettos and flirtatious lyrics" and a bridge that was compared to S Club 7. "Good Boy Gone Bad" is a rock-influenced hip-hop song with "addictive" lyrics and melody, "Hitori no Yoru" is a ballad with lyrics about "lonely love" and a "wistful" piano melody, and "MOA Diary (Dubaddu Wari Wari) is a "bright and buoyant" track serving as a love letter to the band's fans.

== Promotion ==
In support of the album, Tomorrow X Together held their first-ever stadium shows in Japan, performing two concerts at Kyocera Dome Osaka on July 1 and 2 as part of their Act: Sweet Mirage tour. The setlist consisted of 28 songs, including several songs from Sweet: "0x1 Lovesong", "Good Boy Gone Bad", "Ring", "Hitari no Yoru", "Hydrangea Love" and "Sugar Rush Ride". The band also held a showcase on the day of the album's release at Roppongi Hills Arena in Tokyo, performing "Sugar Rush Ride" and "Hydrangea Love" for about 1,000 fans who were selected by lucky draw.

To further promote Sweet, Tomorrow X Together appeared on several Japanese television shows. The band performed on Nippon TV's The Music Day on July 1, TV Asahi's Music Station on the July 7, Fuji TV's 2023 FNS Music Festival "Natsu" on July 13, and TBS Television Music Day on the 15th. The band's July 1 appearance on The Music Day was broadcast live from their Act: Sweet Mirage concert.

Several of the album's songs have been used in Japan's visual media. "Ito" served as the opening theme to the TV Tokyo drama series Rasen no Meikyu: DNA Kagaku Sosa (らせんの 迷宮 - DNA 科学捜査; lit. Spiral Labyrinth - DNA Forensic Investigation) in 2021, becoming Tomorrow X Together's first Japanese soundtrack appearance, while "Hydrangea Love" was used as the theme song for Nippon TV's drama Saiko no Seito: Yomei Ichinen no Last Dance (最高の生徒 〜余命1年のラストダンス; lit. The Best Student: The Last Dance with One Year Left to Live), which began airing shortly after the album's release.

== Commercial performance ==
Sweet was commercially successful in Japan, selling 216,257 copies in its first 24 hours, more than tripling the first day sales of the group's previous album, Still Dreaming. On the Oricon Albums Chart, the album debuted at number-one, selling 303,000 copies in its first week. With Sweet, Tomorrow X Together became the first foreign artist to have eight consecutive number-one albums on the chart. In the United States, Sweet debuted at number 54 on the Billboard 200 album chart dated August 19. At the time, Tomorrow X Together was one of only two Korean acts to chart on the Billboard 200 with a Japanese album (the other being BTS).

Sweet was certified 2× Platinum by the Recording Industry Association of Japan in recognition of sales exceeding 500,000.

== Track listing ==
Track listing and credits adapted from the album's liner notes.

Sweet track listing
No.	Title	Writer(s)	Producer(s)	Length
1.	"Intro: Floating"	Maiz	Maiz	1:51
2.	"Hydrangea Love" (紫陽花のような恋^{[i]})	Yuuri	Yuuri; Kentz	3:52
3.	"Sugar Rush Ride" (Japanese ver.)	"Hitman" Bang; Krysta Youngs; Moa "Cazzi Opeia" Carlebecker; Myah Marie Langston; Ollipop; Slow Rabbit; Sofia Kay; Supreme Boi; Salem Ilese	Slow Rabbit	3:06
4.	"0X1=Lovesong (I Know I Love You)" (Japanese ver.; featuring Lilas Ikuta)	Slow Rabbit; RM; Derek "Mod Sun" Smith; Andrew Migliore; Melanie Joy Fontana; Bang; Danke; Will Simms; Gabriel Brandes; Matt Thomson; Max Lynedoch Graham	Slow Rabbit	3:25
5.	"Ito"	Greeeen	Greeeen; Alysa	4:03
6.	"Ring" (君じゃない誰かの愛し方^{[ii]})	Adora; Hueningkai; Junji Ishiwatari; Slow Rabbit; Taehyun; Yeonjun	Slow Rabbit	3:24
7.	"Magic"	Olly Murs; Sarah Blanchard; Richard Boardman; Pablo Bowman; Anders Froen; Aaron Hibell	The Six; Aaron Hibell; Jenna Andrews^{[a]}; Rob Grimaldi^{[a]}; Stephen Kirk^{[a]}	2:39
8.	"Good Boy Gone Bad" (Japanese ver.)	Bang; Blvsh; Chris James; Fontana; Michel "Lindgren" Schulz; Slow Rabbit; Supreme Boi; Yeonjun; Cho Yun-kyoung	Slow Rabbit	3:11
9.	"Hitori no Yoru" (ひとりの夜^{[iii]})	El Capitxn; Slow Rabbit; Takaya Kawasaki	Kawasaki; El Capitxn	3:38
10.	"MOA Diary (Dubaddu Wari Wari)" (Japanese ver.)	Thomson; Graham; Gabriel Brandes; Alex Karlsson; Taehyun; BigHit Music; James F Reynolds; Beomgyu; Soobin; Yeonjun; Hueningkai	Arcades	3:08
11.	"Ring" (ひとりの夜^{[ii]}; Unplugged ver.)	Adora; Hueningkai; Junji Ishiwatari; Slow Rabbit; Taehyun; Yeonjun	Slow Rabbit	3:25
12.	"Outro: Falling"	Revin	Revin	2:09
Total length:				37:56

Notes

- ^{^[a]} signifies an additional vocal producer.
- lit. "Love like a hydrangea"
- lit. "How to love someone who is not you"
- lit. "One night"

== Charts ==
=== Weekly charts ===
Weekly chart performance for Sweet
Chart (2023)	Peak position
Japanese Albums (Oricon)	1
Japanese Hot Albums (Billboard Japan)	1
Swiss Albums (Schweizer Hitparade)	78
US Billboard 200	54
US World Albums (Billboard)	3

Chart (2026)	Peak position
Greek Albums (IFPI)	61

=== Monthly charts ===
Monthly chart performance for Sweet
Chart (2023)	Peak position
Japanese Albums (Oricon)	2

=== Year-end charts ===
Year-end chart performance for Sweet
Chart (2023)	Position
Japanese Albums (Oricon)	11

== Certifications and sales ==
Sales certifications for Sweet
Region	Certification	Certified units/sales
Japan (RIAJ)	2× Platinum	335,149

== Release history ==
Release history and formats for Sweet
Region	Date	Label	Format(s)	Catalog	Ref.
Various	July 5, 2023	BigHit; Universal Japan; Republic	Digital download; streaming	—N/a	
Japan	July 5, 2023	Universal Japan	CD	TYCT-69267	
Japan	July 5, 2023	Universal Japan	CD + DVD	TYCT-69266	
Japan	July 5, 2023	Universal Japan	CD + Photobook	TYCT-69265	
Japan	July 5, 2023	Universal Japan	CD (Weverse shop Japan exclusive)		
Japan	July 5, 2023	Universal Japan	CD (Universal Music Store exclusive)	D2CE-12410	
Japan	July 5, 2023	Universal Japan	CD (Seven Net Shopping exclusive)	00THN-38642	
