= Chaotic Wonderland =

- Digital and regular edition cover (Note: The cover art for the Limited type A features the members trapped inside a transparent box with the same frozen background)

EP by Tomorrow X Together
- Released: November 10, 2021
- Studios: Hybe (Note: BigHit production team have individual "studios" within the greater Hybe building.) (Seoul); Sound of Sterloid; The One With Big Bulb; Prime Sound, Outer Space (Tokyo); Ekko The Lab
- Genre: Pop rock
- Length: 13:15
- Languages: Japanese; English
- Labels: BigHit; Universal; Republic
- Producers: Alysa; Arcades; Aaron Hibell; Slow Rabbit; The Six

Tomorrow X Together chronology
The Chaos Chapter: Freeze (2021)	Chaotic Wonderland (2021)	Minisode 2: Thursday's Child (2022)

Tomorrow X Together Japanese chronology
Still Dreaming (2021)	Chaotic Wonderland (2021)	Sweet (2023)

Alternative cover
- Limited edition type B cover (Note: The cover art for the Universal Music Store limited edition features the members sitting closer with the same background but with absence of music instruments)

Singles from Chaotic Wonderland
- 1. "Ito" Released: November 3, 2021; 2. "0X1=Lovesong (I Know I Love You) (Japanese version)" Released: November 10, 2021

Professional ratings
Review scores
Source	Rating
AllMusic	3.5/5 stars

Chaotic Wonderland is the first Japanese-language extended play by South Korean boy band Tomorrow X Together. It was released by BigHit Music and Universal Music Japan on November 10, 2021. Thematically, it follows their previous album The Chaos Chapter: Freeze, released in May 2021. The EP contains two Japanese versions of previous Korean releases, their first English single "Magic", and an original Japanese song "Ito".

== Background ==
Tomorrow X Together began 2021 by releasing their first Japanese studio album Still Dreaming on January 20, marking an end to The Dream Chapter series. Later, in May 2021 they began The Chaos Chapter with the release of their second Korean studio album named The Chaos Chapter: Freeze and its repackage album The Chaos Chapter: Fight or Escape on May 31 and August 17 respectively. On September 6, 2021, BigHit Music announced that the band would be releasing their first Japanese extended play on November 10, 2021. Originally, the Japanese featuring artist for "0x1=Lovesong" was undisclosed. Beginning October 22, Universal Music Japan teased the reveal with a set of clues via Twitter. The artist was revealed five days later as Ikuta Lilas, also known as Ikura, the main vocalist for Japanese musical duo Yoasobi.

On September 20, the also-undisclosed Japanese original song was revealed to be "Ito", written by Japanese pop-rap male vocal quartet Greeeen. The song revolves around the themes of attachment, like two people who are each one half of a thread meeting to make one thread. It comes from the feelings you get from forming a deep relationship with someone. Ito is also featured as the opening theme for the TV Tokyo's television drama, Spiral Labyrinth – DNA Forensic Investigation (らせんの迷宮～DNA科学捜査, Rasen no Meikyū – DNA Kagaku Sōsa) which began airing on October 15, 2021.

== Release and promotion ==
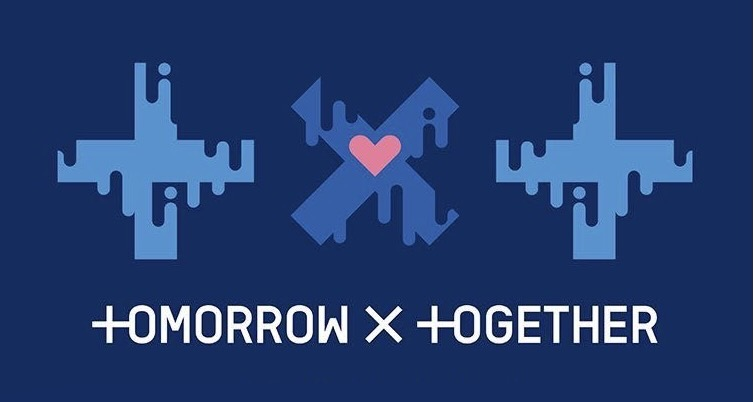
The band's modified logo used for promotional activities

In September, it was announced that Tomorrow X Together would appear in the December 2021 edition of Numéro Tokyo, slated for release on October 28. On October 26, two days prior to the release, the front covers were revealed with a snippet about their interview. The band also appeared on the front cover of "ar"'s December 2021 issue, released on November 12. This was the first time that a male overseas artist was featured on the front cover.

On November 3, 2021, following the TV-sized release for Spiral Labyrinth, "Ito" was pre-released as a digital single available on streaming platforms worldwide.

== Track listing ==
Chaotic Wonderland track listing
No.	Title	Writer(s)	Producer(s)	Length
1.	"0X1=Lovesong (I Know I Love You)" (Japanese version; featuring Lilas Ikuta)	Slow Rabbit; RM; Derek "Mod Sun" Smith; Andrew Migliore; Melanie Joy Fontana; "Hitman" Bang; Danke; Will Simms; Gabriel Brandes; Matt Thomson; Max Lynedoch Graham	Slow Rabbit	3:25
2.	"Ito"	Greeeen	Alysa	4:03
3.	"MOA Diary (Dubaddu Wari Wari)" (Japanese version)	Thomson; Graham; Gabriel Brandes; Alex Karlsson; Taehyun; BigHit Music; James F Reynolds; Beomgyu; Soobin; Yeonjun; Hueningkai	Arcades	3:08
4.	"Magic"	Olly Murs; Sarah Blanchard; Richard Boardman; Pablo Bowman; Anders Froen; Aaron Hibell	The Six; Aaron Hibell; Jenna Andrews^{[a]}; Rob Grimaldi^{[a]}; Stephen Kirk^{[a]}	2:39
Total length:				13:15

Chaotic Wonderland – Limited Edition A (Bonus DVD)
No.	Title	Director(s)	Length
1.	"0X1=Lovesong (I Know I Love You)" (Japanese version; Music Video & Making of Music Video)	Seong Won Mo, Moon Seok Ho (Digipedi)

Chaotic Wonderland – Limited Edition B (Bonus DVD)
No.	Title	Length
1.	"Making of Jacket Photos"

Notes

- ^{^[a]} signifies an additional vocal producer.

== Personnel ==
Credits adapted from Tidal and the liner notes of Chaotic Wonderland.

=== Musicians ===
- Tomorrow X Together – primary artist
  - Soobin – songwriting, backing vocals (track 3)
  - Yeonjun – backing vocals (tracks 1, 2), songwriting (track 3)
  - Beomgyu – songwriting (track 3)
  - Taehyun – backing vocals (tracks 1–3), songwriting (track 3)
  - Hueningkai – backing vocals (tracks 1, 3), songwriting (track 3)
- Lilas Ikuta – featured artist (track 1)
- Revin – songwriting (track 1), gang vocals (track 4)
- Slow Rabbit – songwriting (tracks 1, 3–6, 9)
- RM – songwriting (track 1)
- Derek "Mod Sun" Smith – songwriting, backing vocals (track 1)
- Andrew Migliore – songwriting (track 1)
- Melanie Joy Fontana – songwriting, backing vocals (track 1)
- "Hitman" Bang – songwriting (track 1)
- Danke – songwriting (track 1)
- Will Smiths – songwriting (track 1)
- Gabriel Brandes – songwriting (tracks 1, 3), backing vocals (track 3)
- Matt Thomson – songwriting (track 1)
- Max Lynedoch Graham – songwriting (track 1)
- No Love For The Middle Child – backing vocals (track 1)
- Soma Genda – backing vocals (tracks 1–3)
- Kanata Okajima – Japanese lyrics (track 1)
- Greeeen – songwriting (track 2)
- William Segerdahl – backing vocals (track 2)
- Matt Thomson – songwriting (track 3)
- Max Lynedoch Graham – songwriting (track 3)
- Alex Karlsson – songwriting (track 3)
- BigHit Music – songwriting (track 3)
- James F Reynolds – songwriting (track 3)
- Vendors (Kevin Leinster jr.) – backing vocals (track 3)
- Hiromi – Japanese lyrics (track 3)
- Olly Murs – songwriting (track 4)
- Sarah Blanchard – songwriting (track 4)
- Richard Boardman – songwriting (track 4)
- Pablo Bowman – songwriting, backing vocals (track 4)
- Anders Froen – songwriting (track 4)
- Aaron Hibell – songwriting (track 4)
- Jenna Andrews – backing vocals (track 4)
- Stephen Kirk – backing vocals (track 4)

=== Instrumentation ===
- Slow Rabbit – keyboard, synthesizer (track 1)
- Aaron Sterling — live drum (track 1)
- Young – guitar (track 1)
- Andrew DeRoberts – guitar (track 1)
- Alysa – keyboard, synthesizer (track 3)
- Ricki Ejderkvist – guitar (track 3)
- Matt Thomson – keyboard, synthesizer, guitar (track 3)
- Max Graham – keyboard, synthesizer, guitar (track 3)
- James F Reynolds – keyboard (track 3)
- Aaron Hibell – keyboard (track 4)
- Richard Boardman – synthesizer (track 4)
- Pablo Bowman – guitar (track 4)

=== Production ===
- Slow Rabbit – production (track 1), vocal arrangement (all tracks)
- Alysa – production (track 2)
- Soma Genda – vocal arrangement (track 2)
- Arcades – production (track 3)
- Revin – vocal arrangement (track 3)
- El Capitxn – vocal arrangement (track 3)
- The Six – production (track 4)
- Aaron Hibell – production (track 4)
- Jenna Andrews – vocal production (track 4)
- Rob Grimaldi – vocal production (track 4)
- Stephen Kirk – vocal production (track 4)

=== Technical ===
- Slow Rabbit – digital editing (tracks 1, 2), engineering (tracks 1–3)
- Hiroya Takayama (Sony Music Studios Tokyo) – digital editing, engineering (track 1)
- Aaron Sterling – engineering (tracks 1)
- J.C. Powys – engineering assistance (tracks 1)
- Young – engineering (tracks 1)
- Michel “Lindgren” Schulz – engineering (track 1)
- Adam Hawkins – mixing (track 1)
- Chris Gehringer – mastering (all tracks)
- Soma Genda – engineering, digital editing (track 2, 3)
- Jeon Bu Yeon – engineering (track 2)
- D.O.I – mixing (track 2)
- Revin – digital editing (track 3)
- Son Yujeong – engineering (track 3)
- El Capitxn – engineering (track 3)
- Kim Hyun Soo – engineering (track 3)
- Alex Karlsson – engineering (track 3)
- Gabriel Brandes – engineering (track 3)
- Yang Ga – mixing (track 3)
- John Hanes – mixing (track 4)

== Charts ==
=== Weekly charts ===
Chart performance for Chaotic Wonderland
Chart (2021)	Peak position
Belgian Albums (Ultratop Wallonia)	83
Japanese Albums (Oricon)	1
Japanese Hot Albums (Billboard Japan)	1
US Billboard 200	177
US World Albums (Billboard)	4

=== Monthly charts ===
Monthly chart performance for Chaotic Wonderland
Chart (2021)	Peak position
Japanese Albums (Oricon)	2

=== Year-end charts ===
Year-end chart performance for Chaotic Wonderland
Chart (2021)	Position
Japanese Albums (Oricon)	18
Japanese Hot Albums (Billboard Japan)	19

== Certifications and sales ==
Certifications and sales for Chaotic Wonderland
Region	Certification	Certified units/sales
Japan (RIAJ)	Platinum	186,181

== Release history ==
Release history and formats for Chaotic Wonderland
Region	Date	Label	Format(s)	Catalog	Ref.
Various	November 10, 2021	BigHit; Universal Japan; Republic	Digital download; streaming	—N/a	
Japan	November 10, 2021	Universal Japan	CD + DVD	TYCT-69216	
Japan	November 10, 2021	Universal Japan	CD + DVD	TYCT-69217	
Japan	November 10, 2021	Universal Japan	CD	TYCT-69218	
Japan	November 10, 2021	Universal Japan	CD (Weverse shop Japan exclusive)	PROV-1016	
Japan	November 10, 2021	Universal Japan	CD (Universal Music Store exclusive)	PDCV-1140	
United States	December 3, 2021	UMe	CD + DVD	TYCT-69216K	
United States	December 3, 2021	UMe	CD + DVD	TYCT-69217K	
United States	December 3, 2021	UMe	CD	TYCT-69218K	

== See also ==
- List of Oricon number-one albums of 2021
- List of Billboard Japan Hot Albums number ones of 2021
- List of K-pop albums on the Billboard charts
