= The Chaos Chapter: Freeze =

2021 studio album by Tomorrow X Together

- Digital and You version cover

Studio album by Tomorrow X Together
- Released: May 31, 2021
- Genres: K-pop; pop rock; pop-punk
- Length: 26:08
- Languages: Korean; English
- Label: Big Hit
- Producers: Alex Hope; Slow Rabbit; Aaron Hibell; The Six; Jacob Attwooll; Ebenezer; Magnus; Ollipop; Hueningkai; El Capitxn; Jacob Manson

Tomorrow X Together chronology
Still Dreaming (2021)	The Chaos Chapter: Freeze (2021)	Chaotic Wonderland (2021)

Singles from The Chaos Chapter: Freeze
- 1. "0X1=Lovesong (I Know I Love You)" Released: May 31, 2021; 2. "Magic" Released: June 1, 2021

Repackage album cover
- Digital and Escape version cover

Singles from The Chaos Chapter: Fight or Escape
- 1. "Loser=Lover" Released: August 17, 2021

The Chaos Chapter: Freeze (Korean: 혼돈의 장: Freeze; RR: Hondonui Jang: Freeze) is the second studio album by South Korean boy band Tomorrow X Together. It was released on May 31, 2021, by Big Hit Music through YG Plus in South Korea, and Republic Records in the United States. Three singles were released in promotion of the album: the lead single "0X1=Lovesong (I Know I Love You)" which debuted alongside the album on May 31 and "Magic", the band's first English single, on June 1. A hybrid pop-rock album, it received critical acclaim from critics who praised its diverse bold sounds and cohesiveness, and the way it highlighted the writing and production abilities of the band members. The album became the band's fourth consecutive number-one in South Korea and sold over 630,000 copies upon release. It was certified Triple Platinum by the Korea Music Content Association (KMCA) in August, and has sold over 870,000 copies as of December 2021.

A repackage of the album, The Chaos Chapter: Fight or Escape, containing three new songs: lead single "Loser=Lover", "MOA Diary (Dubaddu Wari Wari)" dedicated to the band's fanbase, and an Emocore remix of "0X1=Lovesong (I Know I Love You)", was released on August 17. "Loser=Lover" and its accompanying music video were released that same day. The album earned Tomorrow X Together their fifth consecutive domestic number-one on the Gaon Album Chart and sold over 600,000 copies by the end of the month. It received Double Platinum certification from the KMCA in October, and has sold over 775,000 copies as of December 2021.

== Background ==
The Chaos Chapter: Freeze marks the beginning of a new series in the Tomorrow X Together's discography, following their Dream Chapter trilogy (2019–20), and their third EP Minisode1: Blue Hour (2020), which served as a "bridge" between the two series and their first Japanese album Still Dreaming released in January 2021.

On April 29, Big Hit Music uploaded a 30-second video trailer to its YouTube channel. The clip showed a pixelated X from Tomorrow X Together's Minisode1 era transforming into a blue cube that shattered to form the X of the TXT logo. At the end, a pink heart emerged in the blue X and the sentence "The Chaos Chapter: Freeze will be released on May 31 at 6 p.m. KST" appeared on screen, revealing the album's title and release date—preorders opened that same day. Three versions were made available for purchase: "World", "Boy", and "You". On May 2, Big Hit posted a promotion schedule online detailing various events leading up to the album's release. A concept trailer for the new era was released on May 10 via the Hybe Labels official YouTube channel. Concept photos for each of the album's versions were released on May 15, 17, and 19 respectively. The album's eight-song tracklist was publicized on May 24, with "0X1=Lovesong (I Know I Love You)" featuring Korean singer Seori revealed as the lead single. Several songs on the track list feature writing credits from the band's members, as well as a production credit for vocalist Hueningkai on the track "Dear Sputnik". An album preview, featuring a mix of excerpts from all eight songs was released on YouTube the following day.

== Release and promotion ==
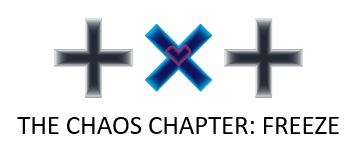
The band's modified logo used for promotional activities

The album was released on May 31 as announced. Musically it incorporates various genres such as pop, rock, punk, alternative rock, and disco. On July 18, Big Hit revealed the release of a repackaged version of the album, the band's first repackage, titled The Chaos Chapter: Fight or Escape, through a 25-second long teaser clip posted to the Hybe Labels YouTube channel. In line with the band's previous releases, the album was made available in multiple formats and contains various memorabilia, including a photo book, lyric poster, photo card, sticker pack, and AR cards. The preorder period began at physical stores and via online sites on July 19. The album's cover art and 11-song track list were revealed on August 6, and included three new songs: the lead single "Loser=Lover", "MOA Diary (Dubaddu Wari Wari)" dedicated to the band's fanbase known as "MOA", and an Emocore remix of "0X1=Lovesong (I Know I Love You)". The album and single, together with an accompanying music video, were simultaneously released on August 17.

=== Singles ===
"0X1=Lovesong (I Know I Love You)" was co-written by BTS member RM. Video teasers were released on May 28 and 29 respectively. The single and its accompanying music video were released in conjunction with the album on May 31. Korean singer Seori's vocal feature on the track marked Tomorrow X Together's first collaborative effort with another artist since the band's debut. Seori has said she met TXT on the day they recorded the song and that "their support made [recording] very easy."

"Magic" is Tomorrow X Together's first official English single. It was released on US radio on June 1, 2021, as the second single to be promoted from the album. Written by Olly Murs, the disco-pop track features "the feel-good, classic pop sound" the band is known for, with "breathy falsettos" and "flirtatious lyrics" while the bridge is reminiscent of an S Club 7 song. The band promoted the single with a series of appearances on American talk shows, and presented its premiere performance on ABC's Good Morning America on June 10, additionally participating in an interview to discuss the track. An accompanying "space-age" music video, released on June 11, was preceded by a teaser on June 9 which showed the band "trapped on a spaceship, running away from gunfire." The band subsequently performed the song on CBS's The Late Late Show with James Corden on June 15. A performance video featuring the band dancing to the song outdoors on a rooftop helipad while dressed in coordinated white shirts and blue jeans was released on June 30.

Tomorrow X Together promoted the repackage through a series of appearances on various domestic television music shows, beginning with their first performance of "Loser=Lover" on Music Bank on August 20. The band won two first-place trophies for the song: on The Show on August 24, and Show Champion on August 25. The album's eighth track, "Frost", was released on October 28.

== Critical reception ==
Professional ratings
Aggregate scores
Source	Rating
Metacritic	89/100
Review scores
Source	Rating
AllMusic	4/5 stars
The Arts Desk	4/5 stars
IZM	3/5 stars
NME	5/5 stars
PopMatters	8/10

Professional ratings
Review scores
Source	Rating
NME	4/5 stars

At Metacritic, which assigns a normalised rating out of 100 to reviews from mainstream critics, the album has an average score of 89 based on 4 reviews, indicating "universal acclaim". Writing for Billboard, Heran Mamo said that "the eight-song project highlights the hybrid pop-rock romantic title track "0X1=Lovesong (I Know I Love You)", featuring South Korean singer Seori. The numbers in the title represent how in the midst of chaos where nothing matters, the boy's love interest is his one and only priority." Teen Vogue's Sara Delgado wrote that "On Freeze, TXT traffic in extremes and, as a result, their stronger tracks are stronger than ever before." In her review for PopMatters, Ana Clara Ribeiro stated that the album "presents a wide range of styles, but there's a streamline tying its songs together. It operates through a new concept of cohesivity, one that embodies variation to some extent". She further commented that it "makes bold statements in unpretentious ways with its production and creative choices", and "fe[lt] like a natural continuation of TXT's path" while "also showcas[ing] new sides of the members' potential as singers, songwriters, and producers". Ribeiro concluded by saying that "you can hardly blame someone for expecting big things from TXT once you hear what they can do in The Chaos Chapter: Freeze" and rated the album 8 out of 10.

== Commercial performance ==
=== The Chaos Chapter: Freeze ===
On May 5, album distributor YG Plus announced that preorders for The Chaos Chapter: Freeze had surpassed 520,000 copies, breaking the band's previous record of 400,000 preorders for Minisode1: Blue Hour. On May 31, the day of release, it was announced that the album had surpassed 700,000 preorders.

The Chaos Chapter: Freeze topped South Korea's Gaon Album Chart for the period May 30–June 5, selling over 630,000 copies in its first week and giving Tomorrow X Together their fourth consecutive domestic number-one. It sold a total of 693,217 copies for the month of May and debuted at number two on the monthly album chart. It was certified Triple Platinum by the Korea Music Content Association (KMCA) in August. According to Gaon's year-end update released in January 2022, the album was the 14th best-selling release of 2021 with 877,917 copies sold.

In Japan, the album opened at number four on the weekly Oricon Albums Chart dated June 14, 2021 for the period May 31–June 6 with 8,460 copies sold, and at number nine on the Digital Albums chart issue of the same date with 890 downloads. It debuted atop the Daily Albums Chart on June 7, and went on to sell a cumulative 76,806 copies for the period June 7–13, earning a new peak at number one on the weekly chart dated June 21 and giving the band their fourth consecutive number-one album in Japan. This made them only the fourth foreign artist in Oricon chart history, after Mariah Carey, Twice, and Seventeen, and the second male foreign artist, also after Seventeen, to achieve this. The album additionally peaked at number one on the Billboard Japan Hot Albums chart issue dated June 16 for the same period. It was certified gold by the Recording Industry Association of Japan (RIAJ) that same month for exceeding sales of 100,000 units.

Tomorrow X Together achieved their first top-10 entry on the US Billboard 200 with The Chaos Chapter: Freeze, which debuted at number five on the chart. This marked the group's highest placement on the ranking since their debut, and made them only the seventh K-pop act to enter the top five. This also made the album the highest-charting release of 2021 by a K-pop act on the Billboard 200. It sold 43,000 equivalent album units, including 39,000 pure sales—this accounted for 96% of its overall total and was the band's best sales week yet—and 6.42 million on-demand streams. Tomorrow X Together became the third male K-pop group in history to chart an album for nine consecutive weeks on the Billboard 200 as of the August 14 issue. The album also entered the World Albums Chart at number four and peaked at number one in its second week, giving the band their third number-one on the World ranking. Following the release of Fight or Escape on August 17, Freeze returned to the top 10 of the Billboard 200, at number eight, on the chart issue dated September 4, with an additional 47,000 equivalent album units moved. It sold a further 14,000 copies the following week. As of the issue dated September 25, the album has spent 13 consecutive weeks on the Billboard 200, further extending its record as the longest-charting K-pop release of 2021.

=== The Chaos Chapter: Fight or Escape ===
On August 11, 2021, YG Plus announced that preorders for Fight or Escape had exceeded 560,000 copies. News media noted that the band's once again recording half a million preorders in such a short period of time—three months—between successive releases was proof of both its selling power and the increasing support from Generation Z for the group as a global act.

In its opening week, Fight or Escape sold 483,911 copies, marking the third-highest first week sales for a repackaged album by a K-pop group in Hanteo chart history. It subsequently debuted at number one on the week 34 issue of the Gaon Album Chart for the period dated August 15–21, and went on to sell 644,369 cumulative copies, securing a number-two debut on the monthly album chart for August. In Japan, the album reentered the top 30 of the daily Oricon Albums chart for August 17 at number 27. It rose to the top of the chart the following day, where it remained for two consecutive days, and reentered the top 50 of the weekly chart, reaching number two on the issue dated August 16–22 with 65,422 copies sold.

== Track listing ==
The Chaos Chapter: Freeze track listing
No.	Title	Writer(s)	Producer(s)	Length
1.	"Anti-Romantic"	Alex Hope; Salem Ilese; Slow Rabbit; "Hitman" Bang; Danke; Song Jae-kyung	Alex Hope; Slow Rabbit	3:35
2.	"0X1=Lovesong (I Know I Love You)" (featuring Seori)	Slow Rabbit; RM; Derek "Mod Sun" Smith; Andrew Migliore; Melanie Joy Fontana; Bang; Danke; Will Simms; Gabriel Brandes; Matt Thomson; Max Lynedoch Graham	Slow Rabbit	3:22
3.	"Magic"	Olly Murs; Sarah Blanchard; Richard Boardman; Pablo Bowman; Anders Froen; Aaron Hibell	The Six; Aaron Hibell	2:40
4.	"Ice Cream" (소악행; Soakaeng [lit. "Small evil deeds"])	Jacob Attwooll; Tristan Landymore; Frederick Cox; Conrad Sewell; Danke; Bang; Lee Seu-ran; Stella Jang; Soobin; Jo Yoon-kyung	Jacob Attwooll	3:23
5.	"What If I Had Been That Puma" (밸런스 게임; Baelronseu geim [lit. "Balance game"])	Ebenezer; Magnus; Yeonjun; Danke; Bang; Taehyun; Jo; Beomgyu; January 8; Lutra; Kim In-hyung	Ebenezer; Magnus	3:33
6.	"No Rules"	Gavin Jones; Olof Lindskog; Ryan Lawrie; Lee Seu-ran; Yeonjun; Danke; Hueningkai; Beomgyu; Bang; Taehyun; Jo; January 8	Ollipop	3:06
7.	"Dear Sputnik" (디어 스푸트니크)	El Capitxn; Hueningkai; Bang; Andy Love; Danke; Brandes; Thomson; Graham; Ronnie Icon; Taehyun; Kim Seon-oh; January 8; Kim Bo-eun; Song Jae-kyung	Hueningkai; El Capitxn	3:15
8.	"Frost"	Ashton Casey; Gina Kushka; Jacob Manson; Yeonjun; Jo; Bang; Kim Bo-eun; Danke; Hwang In-chan	Jacob Manson	3:15
Total length:				26:08

The Chaos Chapter: Fight or Escape bonus tracks
No.	Title	Writer(s)	Producer(s)	Length
1.	"Loser=Lover (Note: "Loser=Lover" is stylized as "LO$ER=LO♡ER".)"	Slow Rabbit; Bang; Andy Love; Lil 27 Club; Billy Walsh; Louis Bell; Daniel Caesar; Oneye; Yeonjun; Moa "Cazzi Opeia" Carlebecker; Alex Karlsson; Ronnie Icon; Hwang In-chan; Jung Jin-woo	Slow Rabbit	3:18
8.	"MOA Diary (Dubaddu Wari Wari)" (교환일기 (두밧두 와리와리))	Thomson; Graham; Brandes; Karlsson; Taehyun; Big Hit Music; James F Reynolds; Beomgyu; Soobin; Yeonjun; Hueningkai	Arcades	3:08
11.	"0X1=Lovesong (I Know I Love You)" (featuring Seori) (Emocore Mix)	Slow Rabbit; RM; Smith; Migliore; Fontana; Bang; Danke; Simms; Brandes; Thomson; Graham	Slow Rabbit; Bang; Revin; El Capitxn	3:39
Total length:				36:14

The Chaos Chapter: Fight or Escape – Digitally signed fan version featuring bonus track 1
No.	Title	Length
12.	"Loser=Lover" (original version)

The Chaos Chapter: Fight or Escape – Fan version featuring bonus track 2
No.	Title	Length
12.	"0X1=Lovesong (I Know I Love You)" (featuring Seori) (Unplugged Mix)

The Chaos Chapter: Fight or Escape – Fan version featuring Bonus Track 3
No.	Title	Length
12.	"Magic" (instrumental)	2:40

== Accolades ==
Music program awards for "0x1=Lovesong (I Know I Love You)"
Program	Date	Ref.
The Show	June 8, 2021	
Show Champion	June 9, 2021	
M Countdown	June 10, 2021	
Music Bank	June 11, 2021	

Music program awards for "Loser=Lover"
Program	Date	Ref.
The Show	August 24, 2021	
Show Champion	August 25, 2021	

Awards and nominations
Ceremony	Year	Category	Result	Ref.
Circle Chart Music Awards	2022	Album of the Year – 2nd Quarter	Nominated	
Golden Disc Awards	2022	Disc Bonsang	Won	
Golden Disc Awards	2022	Disc Daesang	Nominated	
MAMA Awards	2021	Album of the Year	Nominated	

Critic lists
Publisher	Year	Listicle	Version	Ranked
Cosmopolitan	2021	The 34 Best New Albums of 2021	Freeze	25th
NME	2021	The 50 Best Albums of 2021	Freeze	38th
Nylon	2021	The Top K-Pop Albums of 2021	Freeze	Placed
Rolling Stone	2021	The 50 Best Albums of 2021	Fight or Escape	46th
Teen Vogue	2021	Best Albums of 2021	Freeze	Placed
Teen Vogue	2021	Best Albums of 2021	Fight or Escape	Placed
Time	2021	The Best K-Pop Songs and Albums of 2021	Fight or Escape	Placed

== Charts ==
=== Weekly charts ===
Weekly chart performance
Chart (2021)	Peak position	
Chart (2021)	Freeze	Fight or Escape
Australian Digital Albums (ARIA)	12	—
Austrian Albums (Ö3 Austria)	5	—
Belgian Albums (Ultratop Flanders)	17	4
Belgian Albums (Ultratop Wallonia)	31	20
Canadian Albums (Billboard)	49	—
Dutch Albums (Album Top 100)	16	71
Finnish Albums (Suomen virallinen lista)	20	10
German Albums (Offizielle Top 100)	11	—
Hungarian Albums (MAHASZ)	20	14
Italian Albums (FIMI)	93	79
Japanese Albums (Oricon)	1	2
Japan Hot Albums (Billboard Japan)	1	61
Lithuanian Albums (AGATA)	37	—
Polish Albums (ZPAV)	11	29
South Korean Albums (Gaon)	1	1
Spanish Albums (PROMUSICAE)	30	—
Swedish Physical Albums (Sverigetopplistan)	3	6
Swiss Albums (Schweizer Hitparade)	15	—
UK Album Downloads (Official Charts)	19	—
US Billboard 200	5	—
US World Albums (Billboard)	1	—

=== Monthly charts ===
Monthly chart performance
Chart (2021)	Peak position	
Chart (2021)	Freeze	Fight or Escape
Japanese Albums (Oricon)	4	3
South Korean Albums (Gaon)	2	2

=== Year-end charts ===
Year-end chart performance
Chart (2021)	Position	
Chart (2021)	Freeze	Fight or Escape
Japanese Albums (Oricon)	19	—
South Korean Albums (Gaon)	14	16
US Billboard 200	197	—

Year-end chart performance
Chart (2022)	Position	
Chart (2022)	Freeze	Fight or Escape
South Korean Albums (Circle)	96	45

== Certifications and sales ==
The Chaos Chapter: Freeze
Region	Certification	Certified units/sales
Japan (RIAJ)	Gold	100,000^{^}
South Korea (KMCA)	Million	1,005,107
^{^} Shipments figures based on certification alone.

The Chaos Chapter: Fight or Escape
Region	Certification	Certified units/sales
South Korea (KMCA)	Million	1,057,343
