= Still Dreaming (Tomorrow X Together album) =

- Digital and regular edition cover (Note: The cover art for the Limited type B features the members standing with each member looking at the camera from a different angle, while the Weverse Shop Japan limited edition features the members looking at the camera diagonally. Both cover features the same sunset background)

Studio album by Tomorrow X Together
- Released: January 20, 2021
- Studios: Big Hit (Note: Big Hit production team have individual "studios" within the greater Big Hit Entertainment building.) (Seoul); Studio Orat (Tokyo); The EchoBar, Henson (Los Angeles); Brill Building (New York City); The one with the Big Bulb; Birdhouse (Seattle)
- Genre: Pop rock
- Length: 31:19
- Languages: Japanese; English
- Labels: Big Hit; Universal; Republic
- Producers: "Hitman" Bang; El Capitxn; Noah Conrad; Motoki Ohmori; Pdogg; Slow Rabbit; Revin; Uta

Tomorrow X Together chronology
Minisode1: Blue Hour (2020)	Still Dreaming (2021)	The Chaos Chapter: Freeze (2021)

Tomorrow X Together Japanese chronology
Still Dreaming (2021)	Chaotic Wonderland (2021)

Alternative cover
- Limited edition type A cover (Note: The cover art for the Loppi • HMV limited edition features the members sitting around a table while the Universal Music Store limited edition features the members standing straight in formation looking at the camera. Both covers features the same daytime background.)

Singles from Still Dreaming
- 1. "9 and Three Quarters (Run Away) [Japanese Version]" Released: January 14, 2020; 2. "Drama (Japanese Version)" Released: August 7, 2020; 3. "Everlasting Shine" Released: August 18, 2020; 4. "Force" Released: January 10, 2021; 5. "Blue Hour (Japanese Version)" Released: January 20, 2021

Professional ratings
Review scores
Source	Rating
AllMusic	4/5 stars

Still Dreaming (stylized in all caps) is the first Japanese-language studio album by South Korean boy band Tomorrow X Together. It was released by Big Hit Entertainment, Universal Music Japan, and Republic Records on January 20, 2021, three months after their third extended play Minisode1: Blue Hour (2020). The ten-track album comprises Japanese versions of six of the group's Korean songs; two new instrumental tracks; a new original Japanese song, "Force"; and their previous Japanese single, "Everlasting Shine". Recorded in Japanese and English, Still Dreaming is a J-pop album that borrows numerous musical elements including disco, pop rock, and synth-pop.

The album became Tomorrow X Together's third consecutive number one on the Oricon Albums Chart—after The Dream Chapter: Eternity and Minisode1: Blue Hour—with first week sales of over 87,000 copies. It was the group's first album to cross 100,000 copies in Japan and their third release to be certified by the Recording Industry Association of Japan (RIAJ), achieving Gold status that same month.

== Background ==
In March 2019 South Korean boy band Tomorrow X Together debuted with extended play “The Dream Chapter: Star” that portrayed the experiences that boys encounter in the process of growing up. The following releases, “The Dream Chapter: Magic” continued their story of growing from adolescent. In January 2020 TXT debuted in Japan with the single “Magic Hour” which contains the Japanese version of previously released songs. Subsequently, they released their second Japanese single “Drama” in August leading up to the release of their Japanese studio album announced on November 23, 2020, with the release date of January 20, 2021. The album contains songs from all their previous releases.

In November 2020 it was revealed that the single “Force” would be written by Motoki Omori from Mrs. Green Apple, a five-member Japanese rock band from Tokyo. The single was featured as the theme song for the second season of TV Asahi animation series “World Trigger”.

== Release and promotion ==
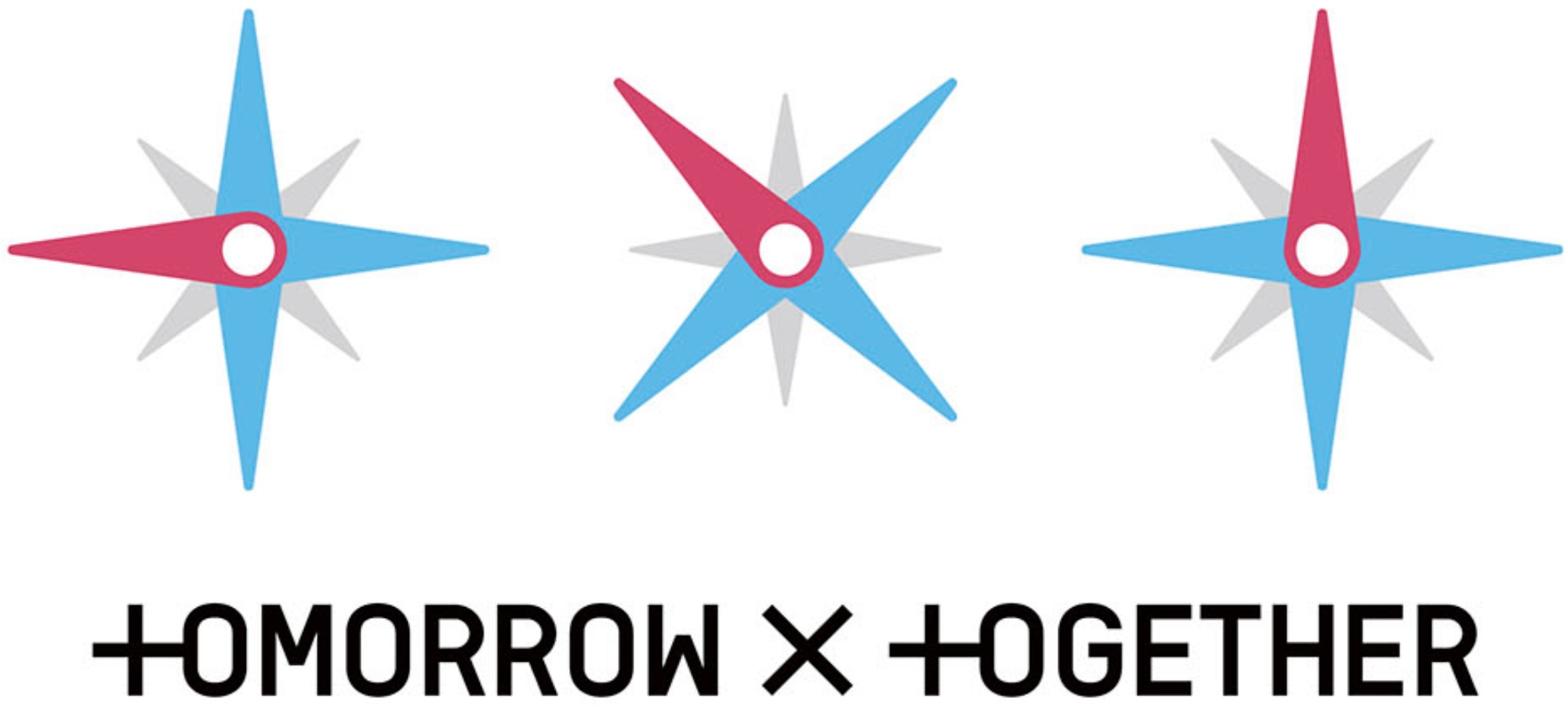
The band's modified logo used for promotional activities

=== Distribution ===
The album was pre-released digitally on January 19, followed by physical release a day later. Limited territories outside of Japan received the physical editions. Physical pre-orders for the album began on November 23, after the different Limited and Regular versions of the album were announced. Six versions of the album were made available: two Limited Editions A and B, a CD only Regular Edition, and three limited editions of the regular edition. Limited Editions A includes the CD and lyrics paper in a Keep case which is encased in a limited-edition deluxe slip case with two 24-page booklet filled with daytime photos and sunset-time photos respectively. Limited Editions B includes a Jewel case containing a CD and a DVD featuring the music video for "Blue Hour (Japanese Ver.)," a making-of video and footage from cover photoshoot, a lyric booklet as well as a 12-page booklet filled with daytime and sunset-time photos encased in a limited-edition slip case. Contrarily, the CD-only Regular Edition comes with a lyric booklet instead and one of five random "Standard ver." photocards included as a first-press only bonus. The Weverse Shop Japan, The Universal Music Store and HMV Limited Editions of this version also include a lyric booklet with the former two having B3 size poster and later having a post card as their respective bonuses. All albums share the same track listing. Following commercial success in Japan, the album was later released in United States on February 12, 2021, through Universal Music Enterprises (UME), a catalog division of Universal Music Group.

=== Marketing ===
Yunika Vision ran a half-hour long special feature of six full-length uncut version of TXT music videos including "Blue Hour [Japanese Ver.]" on its screens in front of Seibu-Shinjuku Station from January 21 to January 27; the feature was also accessible for mobile viewing with high-quality sound via the "VISION α" app.

=== Live performances ===
Tomorrow X Together held the premiere performance of Japanese version of "Blue Hour" on TBS Japan's CDTV Live! Live! Christmas 4-hour special on December 21 via pre-recorded video. They guested on Nippon TV's Buzz Rhythm 02 on January 22 for their second performance of Japanese version of "Blue Hour". The band presented the song again next week on the January 26 broadcast of Nippon TV's Sukkiri.

The band performed "Force" for the first time on TV Asahi's Music Station on January 29. They performed the song again on TV Asahi's Break Out on February 3. They performed the song "Force" in a Single-Take for The First Take which premiered on YouTube channel on February 10. The band continued promoting the album at the TBS Japan's Music Day by performing "Force" on July 17, 2021.

== Commercial performance ==
The album debuted atop the Oricon Weekly Album Chart on chart issue dated February 1, 2021, making it the third consecutive album in Japan to reach number one on Oricon's weekly chart. Still Dreaming also continued in first place on Oricon's daily album chart for six consecutive days after its release, marking first place six times in total during the first week. According to Oricon, Tomorrow X Together's album recorded an estimated 87,000 units in sales within the first week of release. On Billboard Japan's Hot Albums chart, Still Dreaming entered atop, selling an estimated 100,000 units.

On February 12, the Recording Industry Association of Japan (RIAJ) announced that Still Dreaming had sold over 100,000 copies and eventually received a gold certification. The album reached the benchmark within a month of its release on January 20, 2021.

In United States, Tomorrow X Together marked their 3rd entry on the Billboard 200 when Still Dreaming debuted at 173, making them the first artist since BTS to chart on Billboard 200 with a Japanese-language album.

== Track listing ==
Still Dreaming track listing
No.	Title	Writer(s)	Producer(s)	Length
1.	"Intro: Dreaming"	Revin; Slow Rabbit	Revin	1:14
2.	"Force" (from World Trigger, 2021)	Motoki Ohmori	Ohmori	4:01
3.	"Blue Hour (5時53分の空で見つけた君と僕, 5-Ji 53-bu no sora de mitsuketa kimitoboku)" (Japanese Version)	Slow Rabbit; Kyler Niko; Lil 27 Club; "Hitman" Bang	Slow Rabbit	3:30
4.	"9 and Three Quarters (Run Away) (9と4分の3番線で君を待つ, 9 To 4-bun'no 3-bansen de kimi o matsu)" (Japanese Version)	Slow Rabbit; Supreme Boi; Melanie Joy Fontana; Michel "Lindgren" Schulz; Andreas Carlsson; Bang; Pauline Skótt; Peter St. James	Slow Rabbit	3:30
5.	"Crown (ある日、頭からツノが生えた, Aru Ni~Tsu, atama kara tsuno ga haeta)" (Japanese Version)	Slow Rabbit; Fontana; Lindgren; Supreme Boi; Bang; Mayu Wakisaka	Slow Rabbit	3:51
6.	"Angel Or Devil" (Japanese Version)	Pdogg; Supreme Boi; Slow Rabbit; Fontana; Lindgren; Bang; Peter Ibsen; Naitumela Masuki	Pdogg; Slow Rabbit	3:54
7.	"Drama" (Japanese Version)	Supreme Boi; Jake Torrey; Noah Conrad; Roland "Rollo" Spreckley; El Capitxn	Conrad; El Capitxn^{[c]}	3:31
8.	"Everlasting Shine (永遠に光れ, Eien ni hikare)" (from Black Clover, 2020)	Yohei; Uta	Uta	3:13
9.	"Can't You See Me? (世界が燃えてしまった夜、僕たちは..., Sekai ga moete shimatta yoru, bokutachi wa...')" (Japanese Version)	Slow Rabbit; Bang; Supreme Boi; Fontana; Lindgren; Eric Zayne; Naz Tokio	Bang; Slow Rabbit	3:22
10.	"Outro: Still"	El Capitxn; Summergal	El Capitxn	1:13
Total length:				31:19

Still Dreaming – Limited Edition B (Bonus DVD)
No.	Title	Director(s)	Length
1.	"Blue Hour (5時53分の空で見つけた君と僕, 5-Ji 53-bu no sora de mitsuketa kimitoboku)" (Japanese Version) (Music Video & Making of Music Video))	Seong Wonmo (Digipedi)	21:40
2.	"Making of Jacket Photos"	Play Company	17:07
Total length:			38:47

Notes

- ^[c] signifies a co-producer
- "Dreaming" in "Intro: Dreaming", "Crown", and "Still" in "Outro: Still" are all stylized in all caps

== Personnel ==
Credits adapted from Tidal and the liner notes of Still Dreaming.

=== Musicians ===
- Tomorrow X Together – primary artist
  - Soobin – gang vocals (tracks 3, 4), backing vocals (tracks 5, 7, 9)
  - Yeonjun – narration (tracks 1, 10), backing vocals (tracks 3–7), gang vocals (track 3)
  - Beomgyu – gang vocals (tracks 3, 4)
  - Taehyun – backing vocals (tracks 3–7), gang vocals (track 4)
  - Hueningkai – backing vocals (tracks 3–5, 9), gang vocals (track 4)
- Revin – songwriting (track 1), gang vocals (track 4)
- Slow Rabbit – songwriting (tracks 1, 3–6, 9)
- Motoki Ohmori – songwriting, backing vocals (track 2)
- Kyler Niko – songwriting, backing vocals (track 3)
- Lil 27 Club – songwriting (track 3)
- "Hitman" Bang – songwriting (tracks 3–6)
- Masaya Sakudo – Japanese lyrics (track 3)
- Adora – gang vocals (track 3)
- Kim Boram – gang vocals (track 3)
- Kim Chorong – gang vocals (track 3)
- Yoo Hankyul – gang vocals (track 3)
- Jeong Woo Yeong – gang vocals (tracks 3–4)
- Hiju Yang – gang vocals (track 3)
- Kim Jeeyeon – gang vocals (track 3)
- Hyun Ju Lim – gang vocals (track 3)
- Ko Ryongwoo – gang vocals (track 3)
- Supreme Boi – songwriting (tracks 4–7, 9)
- Melanie Joy Fontana – songwriting, backing vocals (tracks 4–6, 9)
- Michel "Lindgren" Schulz – songwriting (tracks 4–6, 9)
- Andreas Carlsson – songwriting (track 4)
- Pauline Skótt – songwriting (track 4)
- Peter St. James – songwriting (track 4)
- Zopp – Japanese lyrics (tracks 4, 9)
- Mayu Wakisaka – songwriting (track 5)
- Shoko Fujibayashi – Japanese lyrics (tracks 5–7)
- Pdogg – songwriting (track 6)
- Peter Ibsen – songwriting (track 6)
- Naitumela Masuki – songwriting (track 6)
- Jake Torrey – songwriting, backing vocals (track 7)
- Noah Conrad – songwriting (track 7)
- Roland "Rollo" Spreckley – songwriting (track 7)
- El Capitxn – songwriting (track 7, 10)
- Yohei – lyrics, backing vocals (track 8)
- Uta – composition (track 8)
- Eric Zayne – songwriting (track 9)
- Naz Tokio – songwriting (track 9)
- Summergal – songwriting (track 10)

=== Instrumentation ===
- Revin – keyboard, synthesizer (track 1)
- Slow Rabbit – synthesizer, keyboard (tracks 1, 3–6, 9)
- Young – guitar (tracks 1, 4, 7, 9)
- Motoki Ohmori – guitar (track 2)
- Del Atkins – bass (track 3)
- Serg Dimitrijevic – guitar (track 3)
- Lee Taewook – guitar (track 5)
- Pdogg – keyboard, synthesizer (track 6)
- Noah Conrad – keyboard, synthesizer (track 7)
- El Capitxn – keyboard, synthesizer (tracks 7, 10)
- Choi Hyung Jong – guitar (track 7)
- Uta – keyboard, synthesizer, guitar (track 8)
- Summergal – keyboard (track 10)

=== Production ===
- "Hitman" Bang – production (track 9), executive production
- Kazuhiro Imanari – executive production
- Revin – production (track 1)
- Motoki Ohmori – production, musical arrangement (track 2)
- Uta – musical arrangement (tracks 2, 8)
- Slow Rabbit – production (tracks 3–6, 9), vocal arrangement (tracks 3–9)
- Adora – vocal arrangement (track 4)
- Supreme Boi – vocal arrangement (track 6)
- Pdogg – production (track 6), vocal arrangement (track 7)
- Noah Conrad – production (track 7)
- El Capitxn – vocal arrangement (track 7), production (track 10)
- Hiss Noise – vocal arrangement (track 7)
- Uta – production (track 8)

=== Technical ===
- Kim Jeeyeon – engineering (tracks 1, 4, 7)
- Slow Rabbit – engineering (tracks 1, 3–10), digital editing (tracks 3–6)
- Jeong Woo Yeong – mixing (track 1), engineering (tracks 5–7, 9)
- Chris Gehringer – mastering
- Motoki Ohmori – programming, engineering (track 2)
- Kim Chorong – engineering (tracks 2, 4), digital editing (track 9)
- D.O.I – mixing (tracks 2, 8)
- Revin – digital editing (track 3)
- Erik Reichers – engineering (track 3)
- Kyler Niko – engineering (track 3)
- Josh Gudwin – mixing (track 3)
- Elijah Merrit-Hitch – mixing assistance (track 3)
- Heidi Wang – mixing assistance (track 3)
- Michel “Lindgren” Schulz – engineering (tracks 4–6, 9)
- John Hanes – mixing (track 4)
- Hiroshi Hayashi – digital editing (track 5)
- Phil Tan – mixing (tracks 5, 9)
- Supreme Boi – digital editing (track 6)
- El Capitxn – digital editing (tracks 6, 7)
- Park Eunjeong – engineering (track 6)
- Jaycen Joshua – mixing (track 6)
- Jacob Richards – mixing assistance (track 6)
- Mike Seaberg – mixing assistance (track 6)
- DJ Riggins – mixing assistance (track 6)
- Pdogg – engineering (tracks 7, 8)
- Noah Conrad – engineering (track 7)
- Yang Ga – mixing (track 7)
- Uta – engineering (track 8)
- Park Jinse – mixing (track 10)

=== Artwork ===
- Yumiko Kobayashi – visual creator
- Nu Kim – visual creator
- Lee Hyun-ju – visual creator
- Jung Su – visual creator
- Jung Rakta – visual creator
- Kim Seung-won – hair
- Han Ah-reum – make up
- Kim Kyu-nam – stylist
- Michiyo Goda – photography

== Charts ==
=== Weekly charts ===
Weekly chart performance for Still Dreaming
Chart (2021–2022)	Peak position
Japanese Albums (Oricon)	1
Japanese Hot Albums (Billboard Japan)	1
Polish Albums (ZPAV)	2
US Billboard 200	173
US World Albums (Billboard)	4

Weekly chart performance for Drama
Chart (2022)	Peak position
Croatian International Albums (HDU)	32

=== Monthly charts ===
Monthly chart performance for Still Dreaming
Chart (2021)	Peak position
Japanese Albums (Oricon)	4

=== Year-end charts ===
Year-end chart performance for Chaotic Wonderland
Chart (2021)	Position
Japanese Albums (Oricon)	36

== Certifications and sales figures ==
Sales certifications for Still Dreaming
Region	Certification	Certified units/sales
Japan (RIAJ)	Gold	108,188

== Release history ==
Release history and formats for Still Dreaming
Region	Date	Label	Format(s)	Catalog	Ref.
Various	January 20, 2021	Big Hit; Universal Japan; Republic	Digital download; streaming	—N/a	
Japan	January 20, 2021	Universal Japan	CD	TYCT-69189	
Japan	January 20, 2021	Universal Japan	CD + DVD	TYCT-69190	
Japan	January 20, 2021	Universal Japan	CD	TYCT-69191	
Japan	January 20, 2021	Universal Japan	CD (Weverse shop Japan exclusive)	PROV-1009	
Japan	January 20, 2021	Universal Japan	CD (Universal Music Store exclusive)	PDCV-1113	
Japan	January 20, 2021	Universal Japan	CD (Loppi・HMV exclusive)	PROV-1010	
United States	February 12, 2021	UMe	CD	TYCT-69189K	
United States	February 12, 2021	UMe	CD + DVD	TYCT-69190K	
United States	February 12, 2021	UMe	CD	TYCT-69191K	

== See also ==
- Album era
- List of Oricon number-one albums of 2021
- List of Billboard Japan Hot Albums number ones of 2021
- List of K-pop albums on the Billboard charts
