= Minisode1: Blue Hour =

2020 EP by Tomorrow X Together

- Digital and R version cover

EP by Tomorrow X Together
- Released: October 26, 2020
- Genres: Disco; rock; R&B
- Length: 16:55
- Labels: Big Hit; Republic
- Producers: El Capitxn; Slow Rabbit; Pdogg; Sam Klempner; Wonderkid; Shin Kung

Tomorrow X Together chronology
The Dream Chapter: Eternity (2020)	Minisode1: Blue Hour (2020)	Still Dreaming (2021)

Singles from Minisode1: Blue Hour
- 1. "Blue Hour" Released: October 26, 2020

Minisode1: Blue Hour is the third extended play by South Korean boy band Tomorrow X Together. It was released through Big Hit Entertainment and Republic Records on October 26, 2020, five months after its predecessor, The Dream Chapter: Eternity (2020).

The album consists of five tracks, including the lead single "Blue Hour", all of which have been co-written by the band members. The band worked with various writers for the album, including British singer-songwriter Charli XCX on the track "We Lost the Summer". As a disco, rock, and R&B album that experiments with indie-rock, nu-gaze, dancehall, and pop rock, Minisode1: Blue Hour features production from El Capitxn, Slow Rabbit, Pdogg, Sam Klempner, and Shin Kung. Written and recorded during the COVID-19 pandemic, the album lyrically narrates the emotions from the perspective of a teenager who has faced changes in his life. The album's artwork and visuals illustrate the connection that can be felt through online communication despite being physically far.

Minisode1: Blue Hour received generally favourable reviews from music critics, with praise towards the emotional narrative. Commercially, the album debuted at number three on South Korea's Gaon Album Chart, selling over 300,000 copies in its first week. The EP entered the US Billboard 200 chart at number 25, becoming the band's highest-charting album in the country. It charted at number one on the Japanese Oricon Albums Chart, becoming the band's second consecutive chart-topper, and also entered Billboard Japan's Hot Albums at number two. To promote the album, Tomorrow X Together appeared on several South Korean music programs including M Countdown, Music Bank, and Show Champion.

== Background ==
Following the conclusion of the three-part "Dream Chapter" series which depicted stories of growth, Big Hit Entertainment posted a motion graphic video on YouTube and Weverse on September 21, 2020, which revealed that Tomorrow X Together would be releasing their third EP, Minisode1: Blue Hour the following month. According to press release, the EP serves as "a short episode told by Tomorrow X Together before they progress into their next series." In an interview with Teen Vogue, the band revealed that the album was written and recorded entirely during the COVID-19 pandemic.

Minisode1 : Blue Hour is our pitstop as we prepare to move onto our next series. It's about the feeling of unfamiliarity that can sometimes hit us all when our relationships with our friends undergo a change. What we've really tried to do through this EP was to deliver a story that only we can tell. It's our take on the experiences of unforeseen circumstances, such as the COVID-19 pandemic, and we have tried to tell it through our own sound and fresh energy.

— Soobin on Minisode1: Blue Hour, The Recording Academy.

== Music and lyrics ==
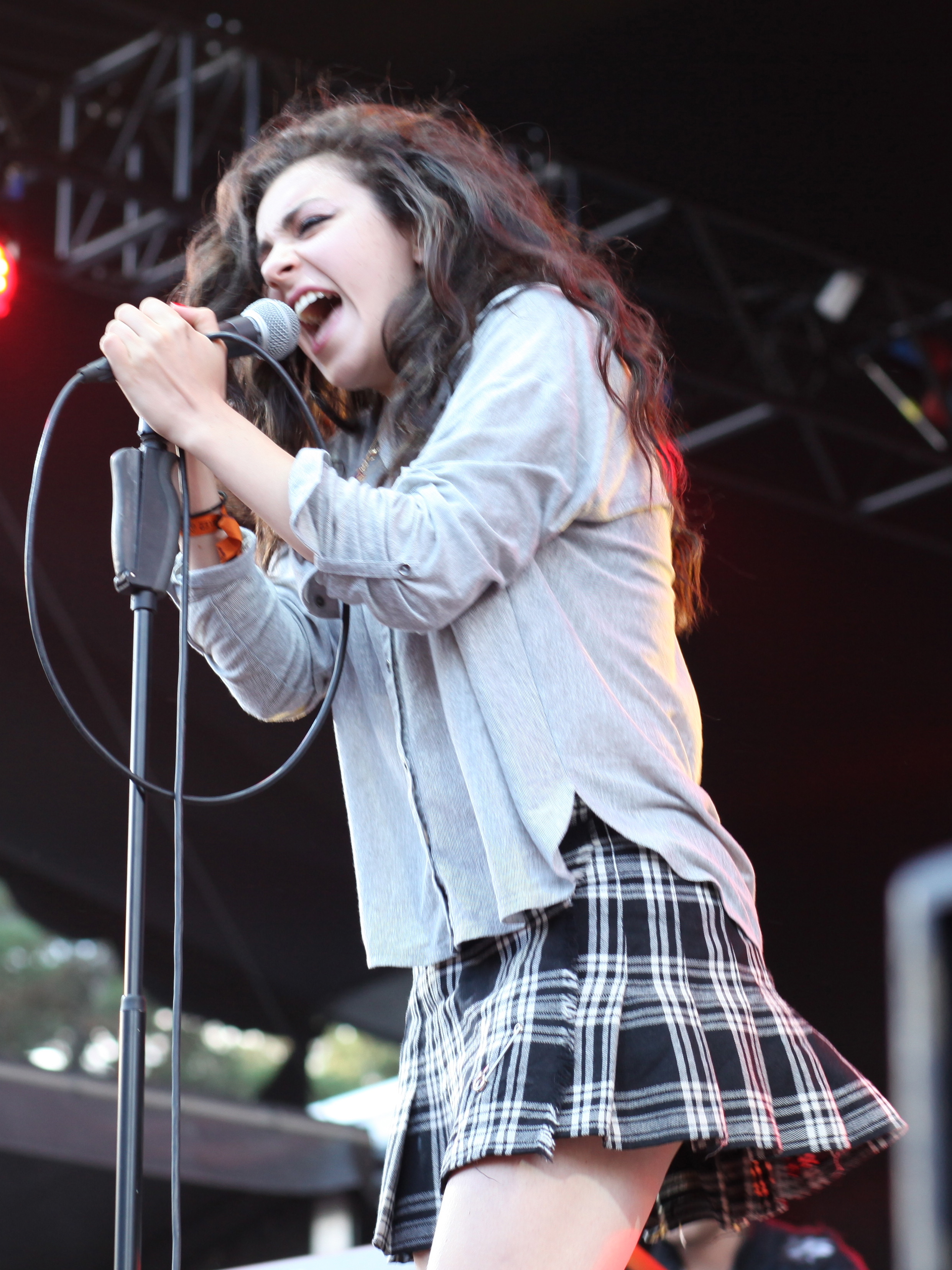
Charli XCX co-wrote the track "We Lost the Summer".

Minisode1: Blue Hour consists of five songs written from the perspective of a teenager who is "isolated and lost in emotions amid the unprecedented pandemic." The songwriting is characterized by hopefulness, loneliness, unfamiliarity, loss of routine, desperation, empathy, and connection. It explores the "conflicts of reality and reflects on the current need for a pause in real life." Minisode1: Blue Hour is primarily a disco, rock, R&B album that experiments with several other genres.

The opening track, "Ghosting" is a nostalgic indie-rock and '80s nu-gaze soft ballad. It begins with vocal harmonies and vintage sound in the chorus before advancing in a melodic arrangement of electric guitars and synthesizers. Lyrically, the track addresses the titular phrase of "ghosting" or "being ghosted" and narrates the confusion and disheartenment of being detached from the world. Soobin and Taehyun co-penned the lyrics of the track with indie-pop singer Lennon Stella.

The title track, "Blue Hour" is an uptempo disco and dance track that has a synth-indebted sound. It is the group's first attempt at disco. Co-composed by Slow rabbit and Bang Si-hyuk, the production employs funky four-on-the-floor beats, rhythm guitars, and groovy and booming bass beats. Driven by electric guitars in the bridges and bass-filled dance breaks in the segments, the soft and breezy track features smooth vocals from the band. The song's Korean title (5시 53분의 하늘에서 발견한 너와 나) is a reference to the time 5:53 PM, which is the golden hour in the city of Seoul in the month of October. Metaphoric to the complex colors of the sky just before the sunset, the lyrics celebrate "the desire to revisit beautiful past memories via one's imagination." Explaining further on the theme in an interview with Elle, Soobin stated, "The scene is mesmerizing, but it's also too dark to recognize and 'know' the people around us, including our friends. There are concepts of unfamiliarity in familiar surroundings; the song expresses a message: even though we may feel solitude in these times, we will continue to hope we still feel the same way as one another.

The third track, "We Lost the Summer" (Korean: 날씨를 잃어 버렸어) is a dancehall number with tropical influences, that was co-written by British singer-songwriter Charli XCX. Backed by guitar, the track takes on a "sunny" production despite delivering a "melancholic" message. Inspired by the 1998 Korean pop song "Arcade" by Han's Band, which focussed on the financial crisis of Korea in the '90s, "We Lost the Summer" parallelly speaks of "teenagers who face a world flipped upside down due to the pandemic." Beomgyu explained, "Many teenagers could no longer go to school and hang out with each other, passing notes, sharing earbuds, and so on. It's our story but it's still a subject that teens all over the world can relate to. It's the teen perspective and we wanted to address it through our music." The fourth track, "Wishlist" is an uplifting and anthemic guitar-driven pop-rock song, co-written by Huening Kai, Taehyun and Yeonjun. Lyrically, it portrays the story of a boy who prepares a gift for his love. The closing track, "Way Home" (하굣길) is a future R&B song knitted with a soft vocals, trap beats, rhythmic drums, and synthesizer harmonies. Exhibiting a sombre melody, it marks a departure from the signature bright and cheery sound of the band. The song captures the loneliness of a boy walking back from school and emphasises the need of companionship. According to Yeonjun, the track is about "a belief that regardless of uncertainties we may feel, we will still be together as long as we remember one another."

== Title and artwork ==
The phrase "Blue Hour" in the title of the album is eponymous and alludes to the "story about boys who are forced to stand at the brink of the real world during the blue hour." In the lead-up to the release of the album, the band teased three versions of concept photos: R, VR and AR. Version R portrayed "the members virtually together but by themselves in an online space." The VR version rendered the band "in a limitless virtual space reflective of today’s online-dominant lifestyle." Version AR illustrated "the gap between their isolation at home and the places they would rather be."

The goal for the visual aspects of this album was to reflect the development of the online space as our hub of communication and togetherness while physically being home. It's become much more natural now to meet people and spend time with one another online; it's a change in our culture and the definition of the "space" we share with our friends. The visual elements are intended to represent the happiness and joy that we can still feel when connected with one another through online and virtual spaces. The bright and vivid colors represent our personal spaces.

— Beomgyu on the artwork, visuals and aesthetics of Minisode1: Blue Hour.

== Release and promotion ==
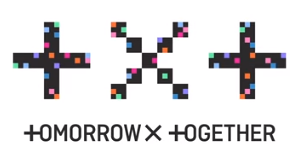
The band's modified logo used for promotional activities

On September 21, 2020, Minisode1: Blue Hour was made available for pre-order in three versions: R, VR and AR, that were packaged in blue, pink and purple pastels, respectively. On September 29, version R of concept photos for the album was released in conjunction with a pixel art teaser. The VR and AR versions of concept photos were released on October 6 and 8, respectively. The EP's track list was revealed on October 9. From October 12 to 16, individual video teasers of each member were uploaded to YouTube. The first group teaser for the music video of the album's lead single "Blue Hour" was released on October 18, followed by a second teaser on October 20. A preview of the tracks featured on the EP was released on October 23. The EP was released on October 26, 2020, in CD and digital formats. The music video for the lead single "Blue Hour", directed by Guzza of Lumpens, was released to Big Hit's YouTube channel in conjunction with the release of the album. A performance version of the video was released on November 9, 2020.

A few hours prior to the album release, the band held a media showcase at the Yes24 Live Hall, Gwangjin-gu, Seoul, which was broadcast online through YouTube. Hours after the album's release, a special "Comeback Show", hosted by Mnet was premiered live worldwide, where they performed "Blue Hour" for the first time. On October 27, the band appeared as guests on KBS Cool FM. A dance challenge with the hashtag "#BlueHour_Moment" was started on TikTok the same day. The group appeared on the October 28 episode of the variety show Weekly Idol. Tomorrow X Together began promoting the album with televised live performances on several South Korean weekly music programs, starting with Mnet's M! Countdown on October 29, where they performed "Blue Hour". The band also appeared on KBS' Music Bank, SBS MTV's The Show, MBC M's Show Champion, and SBS' Inkigayo, to perform the song. They performed "Blue Hour" and "We Lost the Summer" on Kakao TV's Comeback Show MU:Talk Live on November 2. In the second week of promotion, "Blue Hour" won first place on The Show on November 3. The band appeared on SBS Power FM's Cultwo Show on November 8, where they performed "Blue Hour". The band performed "Blue Hour" on Genius's "Open Mic" and MBC FM4U's Kim Shin-Young's Hope Song at Noon on November 17 and November 19, respectively.

Tomorrow X Together released a group teaser for the music video of the album track "We Lost the Summer" on November 10, 2020. Solo photo stills and video teasers were unveiled on November 12 and 13, respectively. The song's music video was released to YouTube on November 13.

== Critical reception ==
Professional ratings
Review scores
Source	Rating
IZM	2.5/5 stars

Upon its release, Minisode1: Blue Hour received generally favourable reviews from music critics. Choi Ji-won from The Korea Herald labelled the EP "very poetic and stirs up listeners’ emotions, as did the band's previous music." Writing for the same publication, Hong Dam-young opined that "the group seemed to have switched gears from the previous EP, which showed a darker side of the bandmates and depicted their youthful struggles," adding "the new music shows they have overcome those struggles." Music journalist Jeff Benjamin praised the album as "a meditation through the high and low points this year is bringing us." On the other hand, Lim Seon-hee from IZM deemed the track list as "easy listening" that still see the group "spread[ing] bright and plump energy [...] which takes a breath away."

== Commercial performance ==
On October 6, the album distributor Dreamus reported that pre-orders for Minisode1: Blue Hour had surpassed 300,000 copies in ten days, setting the highest album pre-orders for the band. By October 25, album preorders had exceeded 400,000 copies.

Minisode1: Blue Hour debuted at number 25 on the US Billboard 200 chart on the issue dated November 21, 2020, selling 19,000 equivalent album units in that week, becoming Tomorrow X Together's first top-forty and highest-charting album in the country. Additionally, it reached number one on both Billboard World Albums and Top Album Sales charts. The album opened at number three on South Korea's Gaon Album Chart, selling 303,190 copies in its first week, surpassing the band's previous record of 181,000 copies with The Dream Chapter: Eternity. Minisode1: Blue Hour was the seventh best-selling album of October 2020 in South Korea, selling 415,761 physical copies. The EP claimed the top spot on the Oricon Albums Chart on the chart issue dated October 26 – November 1, 2020, with 32,057 copies sold, becoming TXT's second number-one album in Japan, following The Dream Chapter: Eternity. It also topped Billboard Japan's Top Albums Sales and charted at number two on the Hot Albums with 24,462 units sold. In December 2020, the EP received a platinum certification from the Korea Music Content Association (KMCA), denoting 250,000 shipments.

== Accolades ==
Music program awards
Song	Program	Date	Ref.
"Blue Hour"	The Show	November 3, 2020	

Year-end lists
Critic/Publication	List	Work	Rank	Ref.
BuzzFeed	35 Songs That Helped Define K-Pop In 2020	"Blue Hour"	11	
MTV	The Best K-Pop B-Sides of 2020	"Ghosting"	10	
Rolling Stone India	10 Best K-pop Albums of 2020	Minisode1: Blue Hour	7	
CNN Philippines Life	Our Best K-pop Songs of 2020	"Blue Hour"	—N/a	
South China Morning Post	The Top 15 K-pop Albums of 2020	Minisode1: Blue Hour	—N/a	

== Track listing ==
Credits adapted from Spotify and Tidal.

Minisode1: Blue Hour track listing
No.	Title	Writer(s)	Producer(s)	Length
1.	"Ghosting"	El Capitxn; Danke (Lalala Studio); Kyler Niko; David Charles Fischer; Taehyun; Lee Seu-ran; January 8th; Lennon Stella; Erin McCarley; Slow Rabbit; Soobin; Kim Bo-eun; Ruuth (Note: Also known as Blvsh.); Chris James	El Capitxn	3:43
2.	"Blue Hour" (5시 53분의 하늘에서 발견한 너와 나^{[a]})	Slow Rabbit; Kyler Niko; Lil 27 Club; "Hitman" Bang	Slow Rabbit	3:29
3.	"We Lost the Summer" (날씨를 잃어버렸어^{[b]})	Charli XCX; Charlotte Grace Victoria Lee; Colton Ward; Slow Rabbit; Pdogg; Kyle Bladt Knudsen; Lil 27 Club	Slow Rabbit; Pdogg	3:31
4.	"Wishlist"	Sam Klempner; "Hitman" Bang; Cazzi Opeia; Ellen Berg; Melanie Joy Fontana; Michel "Lindgren" Schulz; Kim Bo-eun; Danke (Lalala Studio); Lee Seu-ran; Lil 27 Club; Taehyun; Yeonjun; Hueningkai; Slow Rabbit; Jo Yoon-kyung; Lutra	Sam Klempner	3:12
5.	"Way Home" (하굣길^{[c]})	Wonderkid; Shinkung; Sofia Kay; "Hitman" Bang; Adora; Melanie Joy Fontana; Michel "Lindgren" Schulz; Bobby Chung; Nu'maker; Danke (Lalala Studio); Joni	Wonderkid; Shinkung	3:03

Notes

- ^[a] Daseot-si osipsam-bun-ui haneul-eseo balgyeonhan neowa na lit. "You and I found each other in the sky at 5:53"
- ^[b] Nalssi-reul ireobeoryeosseo lit. "Lost the weather"
- ^[c] Hagyotgil lit. "Way home from school"

== Personnel ==
Credits adapted from Tidal.

- Tomorrow X Together – lead vocals (all tracks)
- El Capitxn – production, keyboards, synthesizer, recording (track 1), vocal arrangement (tracks 1–2, 4), sound editing (tracks 1, 4)
- Slow Rabbit – production (tracks 1–2), keyboards, synthesizer, (tracks 2–3) recording (tracks 2–3, 5), vocal arrangement (tracks 2–5), sound editing (tracks 2–3)
- Hueningkai – backing vocals (all tracks)
- Taehyun – backing vocals (all tracks)
- Chris Gehringer – mastering (track 1)
- Hector Castillo – mixing (track 1)
- Kim Cho-rong – recording (track 1)
- Frants – synthesizer (track 1)
- Vendors – backing vocals, synthesizer(track 1)
- Joo-hwan Seo – synthesizer (track 1)
- Adora – vocals (tracks 2, 4–5), recording (track 5)
- Borom Kim – vocals (tracks 2, 4)
- Chorong Kim – vocals (tracks 2, 4), recording (tracks 3–5)
- Yoo Han-gyeol – vocals (tracks 2, 4)
- Wooyoung Jung – vocals (tracks 2, 4), recording (track 4)
- Elijah Merrit-Hitch – mixing assistance (tracks 2–3)
- Heid Wang – mixing assistance (tracks 2–3)
- Kyler Niko – backing vocals, recording (track 2)
- Yeonjun – backing vocals (tracks 2–5)
- Del Atkins – bass (track 2)
- Serg Dimitrijevic – guitars (track 2)
- Josh Godwin – mixing (tracks 2–3)
- Erik Reichers – recording (track 2)
- Revin – sound editing (tracks 2–4)
- Young – guitars (track 3)
- Pdogg – production, keyboards, synthesizer (track 3)
- Yoojeong Son – recording (tracks 3–4)
- Cazzi Opeia – backing vocals, recording (track 4)
- Ellen Berg – backing vocals, recording (track 4)
- Melanie Joy Fontana – backing vocals (tracks 4–5)
- Sam Klempner – production, bass, guitars, keyboards, recording, (track 4)
- Park Jinse – mixing (track 4)
- Michel "Lindgren" Schluz – recording (tracks 4–5)
- Shin Kung – production, keyboards, vocal arrangement (track 5)
- Wonderkid – production, synthesizer (track 5)
- Yang Ga – mixing (track 5)
- Ji-yeon Kim – recording (track 5)

== Charts ==
=== Weekly charts ===
Weekly chart performance
Chart (2020–23)	Peak position
Belgian Albums (Ultratop Flanders)	129
Hungarian Albums (MAHASZ)	33
Japanese Albums (Oricon)	1
Japan Hot Albums (Billboard)	2
South Korean Albums (Gaon)	1
Spanish Albums (Promusicae)	78
Swedish Physical Albums (Sverigetopplistan)	12
US Billboard 200	25
US Tastemaker Albums (Billboard)	9
US Top Album Sales (Billboard)	1
US Top Current Album Sales (Billboard)	1
US World Albums (Billboard)	1

=== Monthly chart ===
Chart (October 2020)	Position
South Korean Albums (Gaon)	7

=== Year-end charts ===
Year-end chart performance
Chart (2020)	Position
Japanese Albums (Oricon)	83
South Korean Albums (Gaon)	19
Chart (2022)	Position
South Korean Albums (Circle)	59

== Certifications ==
Certifications
Region	Certification	Certified units/sales
South Korea (KMCA)	Million	1,000,000^{^}
^{^} Shipments figures based on certification alone.

== Release history ==
Release dates and formats
Region	Date	Format(s)	Label(s)	Ref.
Various	October 26, 2020	CD; Digital download; Streaming	Big Hit	
Various	October 26, 2020	CD; Digital download; Streaming	Republic	
