= Hueningkai =

American singer (born 2002)

- Hueningkai in August 2026
- Born: Kai Kamal Huening; August 14, 2002 (age 24); Honolulu, Hawaii, U.S.
- Occupations: Singer; songwriter
- Musical career
- Genre: K-pop
- Instruments: Vocals; drums
- Years active: 2019–present
- Label: Big Hit
- Member of: Tomorrow X Together

Signature
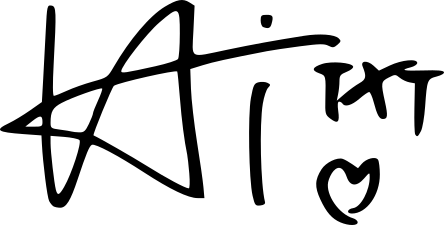

Kai Kamal Huening (born August 14, 2002), known professionally as Hueningkai (Korean: 휴닝카이), is an American singer and songwriter based in South Korea. He is a member of the South Korean boy band Tomorrow X Together, which debuted under Big Hit Entertainment in March 2019. In addition to his work with the group, he has participated in individual fashion campaigns and editorial features.

== Early life and education ==
Hueningkai was born Kai Kamal Huening on August 14, 2002, in Honolulu, Hawaii, to a South Korean mother and an American father of German descent.

His siblings are older sister, model Jung Lea, and younger sister, Huening Bahiyyih of Kep1er. His father, Nabil David Huening, was also a singer and television personality in China, where the family lived until his parents separated when Hueningkai was seven. Following the separation, he and his siblings moved to South Korea with their mother.

Hueningkai has perfect pitch and was surrounded by music from an early age, where he took up piano, guitar and drums as a child. At age five, he was inspired to become a performer after watching a street musician play guitar. During his middle school years, he played drums and served as frontman in a school band he formed, an experience he later cited as foundational to his musical identity. Besides drums, he also plays the guitar, piano and flute.

He and his older sister, Lea, originally auditioned together as a singer-songwriter duo, but a talent scout who had seen one of their auditions later invited Hueningkai to audition individually for Big Hit Music, where he performed AKMU's "Give Love" and Maroon 5's "Sunday Morning" and was accepted as a trainee at age 13. He attended Yongmun Middle School and later Lila Art High School, before transferring to and graduating from Hanlim Multi Art School in 2021.

== Career ==
On January 16, 2019, Big Hit Entertainment revealed Hueningkai as the third member of Tomorrow X Together. On March 4, 2019, the group officially debuted with the release of their first extended play (EP), The Dream Chapter: Star.

As a songwriter, Hueningkai co-produced and co-wrote the pop rock track "Dear Sputnik" for TXT's album The Chaos Chapter: Fight or Escape (2021). He has since continued to contribute to the group's discography, with credits on over 20 songs by 2024. HueningKai co-hosted EBS radio show "Listen" with his bandmate Taehyun from January to May 2021.

Since 2023 to 2025, Hueningkai has performed on special solo stages or collaborative stages at broadcast shows every year. On November 28, 2023, he performed "Endless Rain" by X Japan at the 2023 MAMA Awards in Japan with Yoshiki, Taehyun, Jaehyun of BoyNextDoor, Anton of Riize, Han Yu-jin of Zerobaseone. On April 20, 2024, he performed his first solo stage at the 2024 Music Bank World Tour in Antwerp, Belgium, covering "Sk8er Boi" by Avril Lavigne. On November 22, 2024, he performed as a drummer while covering "Left Hander" by Panic as a collaborative temporary band called Toenze with bandmate Beomgyu, Jay of Enhypen, Kim Tae-rae and Han Yu-jin of Zerobaseone for the 2024 MAMA Awards. On December 25, 2025, he teamed up with Zhang Hao of Zerobaseone, Sohee of Riize, and Shinyu of TWS as the YoungNoblez to cover "You Were Beautiful" by DAY6 for the 2025 SBS Gayo Daejeon.

In June 2024, he starred in the music variety web series, Hueningkai Wants to Start a Band, exploring various instruments and collaborations with university student-led bands across Seoul. A total of 5 episodes were released.

On July 6, 2024, Hueningkai performed a live cover of Yuuri's "Betelgeuse" with Snow Man member Shota Watanabe for NTV's The Music Day 2024 music program and became an overnight sensation in Japan. His cover of "Betelgeuse" led to a revitalized resurregence of the song's popularity in Korea and Japan. Since the broadcast, Hueningkai has been invited to perform on Japanese music programs every year. On August 22, 2024, he covered the song "Tokyo Flash" by Vaundy with Jungwon of Enhypen during the NHK Music Expo 2024. Hueningkai returned on July 5, 2025, for NTV's The Music Day 2025 music program covering "Rusty Nail" by X Japan with bandmate Taehyun and again on July 4, 2026, for NTV's The Music Day 2026 music program to perform a live cover of Kenshi Yonezu's "Lemon" with bandmates Taehyun and Beomgyu.

In June 2025, Hueningkai participated in his first solo overseas schedule in China for fashion event, Harper's Bazaar Gala in Shanghai, where he performed a cover of Ding Yuxi's "Dissipating Dialogue" and accepted the award for Asia's Most Awaited Band on behalf of Tomorrow X Together. On July 21, 2025, Hueningkai released his first solo song, "Dance With You", as part of Tomorrow X Together's album The Star Chapter: Together. An accompanying music video, directed by Lee Jaedon, portraying Hueningkai dancing alone in a bar was filmed in Mexico and released on August 1, 2025. In October 2025, he hosted a new variety web series called Hueningkai's Countless Friends, where he interviews and bonds with several notable peers in the K-pop and entertainment industry. A total of six episodes have been released.

On October 10, 2026, a Bilibili exclusive mini webseries totaling 3 episodes premiered called Hueningkai's Study Abroad Diary in Beijing where he retraces his early childhood memories in Beijing, attempts to order local food in Chinese, and explores attractions such as Universal Studios Beijing.

== Other ventures ==
=== Fashion and endorsements ===
In 2025, Hueningkai was announced as the global brand ambassador for Korean cosmetic company, Dermafirm.

Huening Kai attending Seoul Fashion Week in 2024

Hueningkai has been featured in a variety of fashion magazines, both domestically and internationally. His first solo pictorial was in the September 2021 issue of GQ Korea and his first cover issue was for the January 2023 issue of Men's Folio. Since then, he has been featured on the cover of Elle Korea's 34th Anniversary November 2026 special edition 'Hello, Little Love' issue with a rescued cat named Popo to bring awareness to adopting from shelters, the November 2026 special edition issue of 25ans magazine, the October 2025 issue of Nylon Japan Guys and had a multi-cover feature for the Fall 2025 issue of Maps Korea and Maps Japan. In 2023, he participated in his first joint photoshoot with his sister, Bahiyyih of Kep1er, for the December 2023 issue of GQ Korea. They participated in their second joint photoshoot for the June 2026 issue of Dazed Korea. In 2024, he paired up with bandmate Taehyun, for a joint pictorial for July 2024 issue of Elle Korea. In 2026, he participated in 3 solo pictorials for L'Officiel Korea, GQ Korea and Cosmopolitan Korea.

Since 2023, Hueningkai has also been a fixture at Seoul Fashion Week every year, having attended the fashion show six times, making five appearances to support his sister, Lea, who walks for the Kwak Hyun Joo Collection and in September 2025, he also attended the Andersson Bell show at Seoul Fashion Week.

=== Philanthropy ===
On January 3, 2025, Hueningkai donated ₩50 million (US$37,305.75) to support the families of victims of the Jeju Air Flight 2216 plane crash.

== Artistry ==
In an interview with GQ Korea in 2021, Hueningkai discussed his evolving vocal technique, noting that he intentionally used a raspier, more strained delivery for tracks in The Chaos Chapter: Freeze to better convey the emotional weight of the lyrics. He stated his ultimate goal as a musician is to "touch people's emotions through music."

Hueningkai reflected on his creative growth in a 2023 interview with W Korea and his desire to take a more active role in the TXT's musical direction.

== Discography ==
=== Singles ===
==== As lead artist ====
Title	Year	Peak chart positions	Album
Title	Year	KOR DL	Album
"Dance With You" (Note: credited to Tomorrow X Together, but the track is a solo by Hueningkai)	2025	14	The Star Chapter: Together

=== Soundtrack appearances ===
List of soundtrack appearances, showing year released, selected chart positions, and name of the album
Title	Year	Peak chart positions	Album	Ref.
Title	Year	KOR DL	Album	Ref.
"Can't Stop" (with Taehyun)	2024	51	Brewing Love Original Soundtrack	
"Surfing in the Moonlight" (with Taehyun)	2025	—	Melo Movie Original Soundtrack	

=== Songwriting credits ===
All song credits are adapted from the Korea Music Copyright Association's database unless otherwise noted.

List of songs, showing year released, artist name, and name of the album
Year	Title	Artist	Album	Composer	Lyricist	Producer
2019	"Roller Coaster"	Tomorrow X Together	The Dream Chapter: Magic	Yes	Yes	No
2020	"Maze in the Mirror"	Tomorrow X Together	The Dream Chapter: Eternity	Yes	Yes	No
2020	"Sweat"	Tomorrow X Together	Non-album single	Yes	Yes	No
2020	"Wishlist"	Tomorrow X Together	Minisode1: Blue Hour	Yes	Yes	No
2021	"No Rules"	Tomorrow X Together	The Chaos Chapter: Freeze	Yes	Yes	No
2021	"Dear Sputnik"	Tomorrow X Together	The Chaos Chapter: Freeze	Yes	Yes	Yes
2021	"MOA Diary (Dubaddu Wari Wari)"	Tomorrow X Together	The Chaos Chapter: Fight or Escape	Yes	Yes	No
2021	"Sweet Dreams"	Tomorrow X Together	Non-album single	Yes	Yes	No
2022	"Opening Sequence"	Tomorrow X Together	Minisode 2: Thursday's Child	Yes	Yes	No
2022	"Lonely Boy"	Tomorrow X Together	Minisode 2: Thursday's Child	Yes	Yes	No
2023	"Happy Fools" (feat. Coi Leray)	Tomorrow X Together	The Name Chapter: Temptation	Yes	Yes	No
2023	"Ring (君じゃない誰かの愛し方)"	Tomorrow X Together	Sweet	Yes	No	No
2023	"Growing Pain"	Tomorrow X Together	The Name Chapter: Freefall	Yes	Yes	No
2023	"Dreamer"	Tomorrow X Together	The Name Chapter: Freefall	Yes	Yes	No
2023	"Blue Spring"	Tomorrow X Together	The Name Chapter: Freefall	Yes	Yes	No
2024	"I'll See You There Tomorrow"	Tomorrow X Together	Minisode 3: Tomorrow	Yes	Yes	No
2024	"Miracle"	Tomorrow X Together	Minisode 3: Tomorrow	Yes	Yes	No
2024	"Kitto Zutto"	Tomorrow X Together	誓い (CHIKAI)	Yes	Yes	Yes
2024	"Open Always Wins"	Tomorrow X Together	Non-album single	Yes	Yes	No
2024	"Resist (Not Gonna Run Away)"	Tomorrow X Together	The Star Chapter: Sanctuary	Yes	Yes	No
2024	"Love Language"	Tomorrow X Together	Non-album single	Yes	Yes	No
2026	"21st Century Romance"	Tomorrow X Together	7th Year: A Moment of Stillness in the Thorns	Yes	Yes	No

== Filmography ==
=== Web shows ===
Year	Title	Role	Ref.
2024	Hueningkai Wants to Start a Band	Himself	
2025-2026	Hueningkai's Countless Friends	Himself	
2026	Hueningkai's Study Abroad Diary in Beijing	Himself	

=== Radio ===
Year	Title	Role	Notes	Ref.
2021	Listen	DJ	with Taehyun	

=== Hosting ===
Hosting appearances
Year	Title	Role	Notes	Ref.
2020	Music Bank	Special MC	with Seunghee	
2021	Music Bank	Special MC	with Seunghee	
2021	Music Bank	Special MC	with Jang Won-young and Sunghoon	
2023	M Countdown	Special MC	with Miyeon	
2025	Music Bank	Special MC	with Soobin	
