= Tomorrow X Together =

South Korean boy band

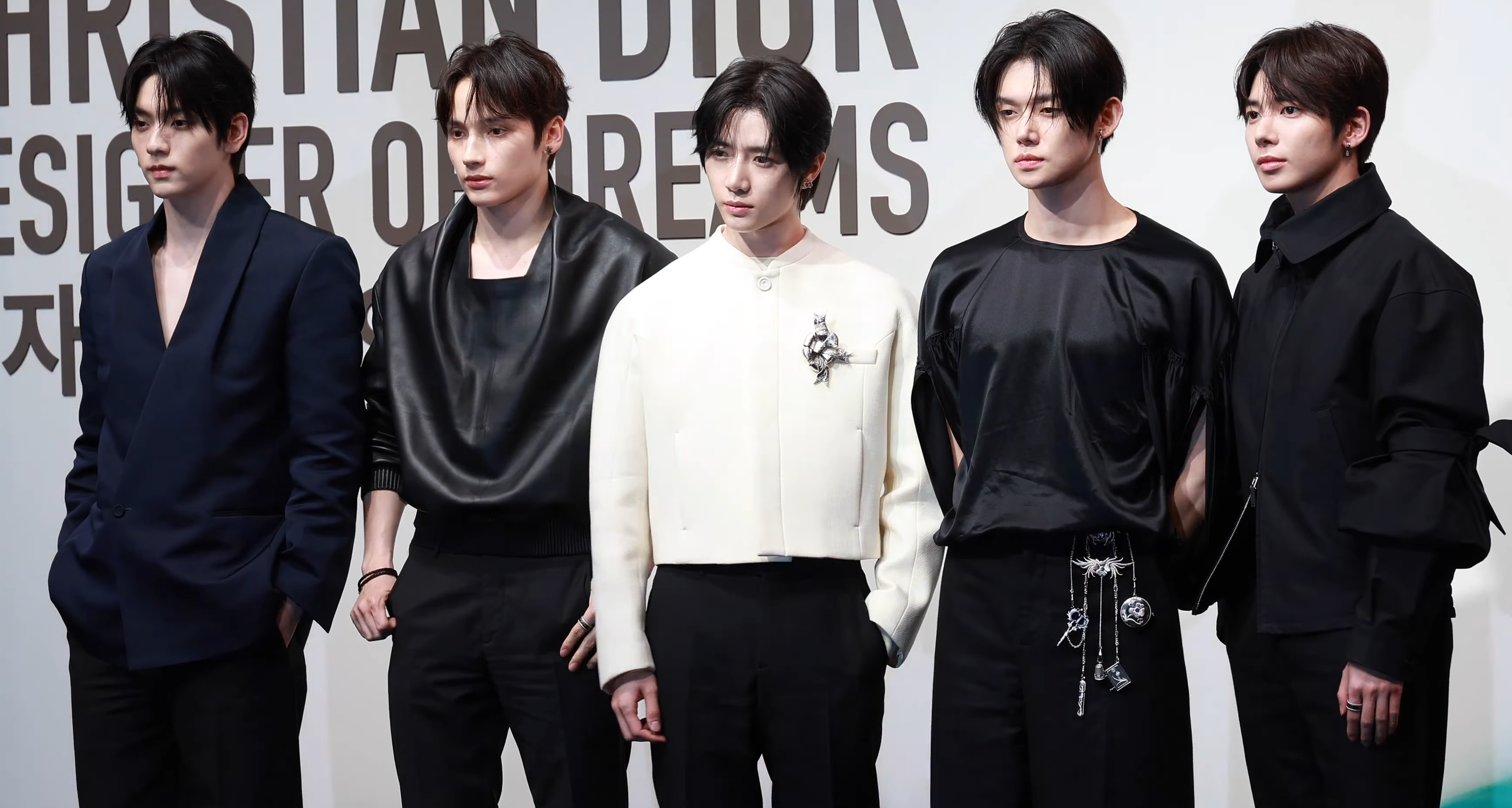
- Tomorrow X Together in April 2025; L-R: Soobin, Hueningkai, Beomgyu, Yeonjun, and Taehyun

Background information
- Also known as: TXT
- Origin: Seoul, South Korea
- Genres: K-pop; disco; house; indie rock; pop
- Years active: 2019–present
- Labels: BigHit; Universal Japan; Republic
- Members: Yeonjun; Soobin; Beomgyu; Taehyun; Hueningkai
- Website: ibighit.com/txt

Tomorrow X Together (Korean: 투모로우바이투게더; Tomorrow by Together), commonly abbreviated as TXT, is a South Korean boy band formed by Big Hit Entertainment. The group consists of five members: Yeonjun, Soobin, Beomgyu, Taehyun, and Hueningkai.

They debuted on March 4, 2019, with the extended play (EP) The Dream Chapter: Star. The EP debuted and peaked at number one on the Gaon Album Chart and Billboard World Albums Chart and entered the US Billboard 200 at number 140, the highest-charting debut album by any male K-pop group at the time. Its lead single "Crown" debuted at number one on the Billboard World Digital Songs chart. The group also topped the Billboard Emerging Artists chart. Tomorrow X Together was the first Korean boy band to perform and headline at Lollapalooza, one of the biggest music festivals in the US, and also the first to perform there twice.

The band's early commercial success earned them several new artist awards, including Rookie of the Year at the 34th Golden Disc Awards and the 2019 Melon Music Awards, New Artist of the Year at the 9th Gaon Chart Music Awards, and Best New Male Artist at the 2019 Mnet Asian Music Awards.

== Name ==
In Korean, the group's name is 투모로우바이투게더, which is "Tomorrow by Together" transliterated into Hangul; they do not have a separate Korean version of their name. According to their website, their name refers to five individuals who "come together under one dream in hopes of building a better tomorrow".

The full name is often shortened to 투바투; Tubatu by Korean media and fans. International media and fans often shorten the group's name to TXT. In their first interview with MBC's Section TV, the band stated that they prefer to be called "Tomorrow X Together" over "TXT".

== History ==
=== Pre-debut activities ===
Plans for a second boy group from Big Hit Entertainment were announced by founder Bang Si-hyuk as early as 2017, and a debut date for early 2019 was set in November 2018. Tomorrow X Together was officially revealed on January 10, 2019. Over the next ten days, videos depicting each member, dubbed "introduction films," were released on YouTube.

=== 2019: Debut and The Dream Chapter: Magic ===
In 2019, Big Hit Entertainment announced their new boy group, Tomorrow X Together. The band's debut broadcast aired on Big Hit's YouTube page, announced alongside their debut extended play (EP), The Dream Chapter: Star, which was released on March 4, 2019. Their debut showcase was held at the Yes24 Live Hall on March 5. Following the release of the EP, the music video of the album's lead single, "Crown" garnered 14.5 million views on YouTube, breaking the record for the most viewed K-pop debut music video within 24 hours for a boy group and the most liked K-pop debut music video, with 2.3 million likes in 24 hours. The album debuted atop the Gaon Album Chart and Billboard World Albums Chart, while "Crown" debuted at number one on the Billboard World Digital Songs chart. The band debuted at number one on the Billboard Emerging Artists and at number 140 on the Billboard 200 chart, making them the fastest to appear in these charts (they were the second fastest K-pop group to appear in the Billboard Emerging Artists) and highest-charting debut album by any male K-pop group. The album also ranked at number three on Oricon's Weekly Album Chart. Additionally, it went on to top the Gaon Monthly Album Chart for the month of March. Tomorrow X Together's first music show performance aired on March 7, 2019, on Mnet's M Countdown. They earned their first music show win on SBS MTV's The Show with "Crown", just after one week after their debut, followed by wins on M Countdown and Show Champion. "Crown" featured on GQ's Decade-end list of "game-changers from a decade of K-pop" for the year 2019, with GQ writing, "The bright, effervescent pop of TXT who are in their own element as they playfully explore teenage growing pains."

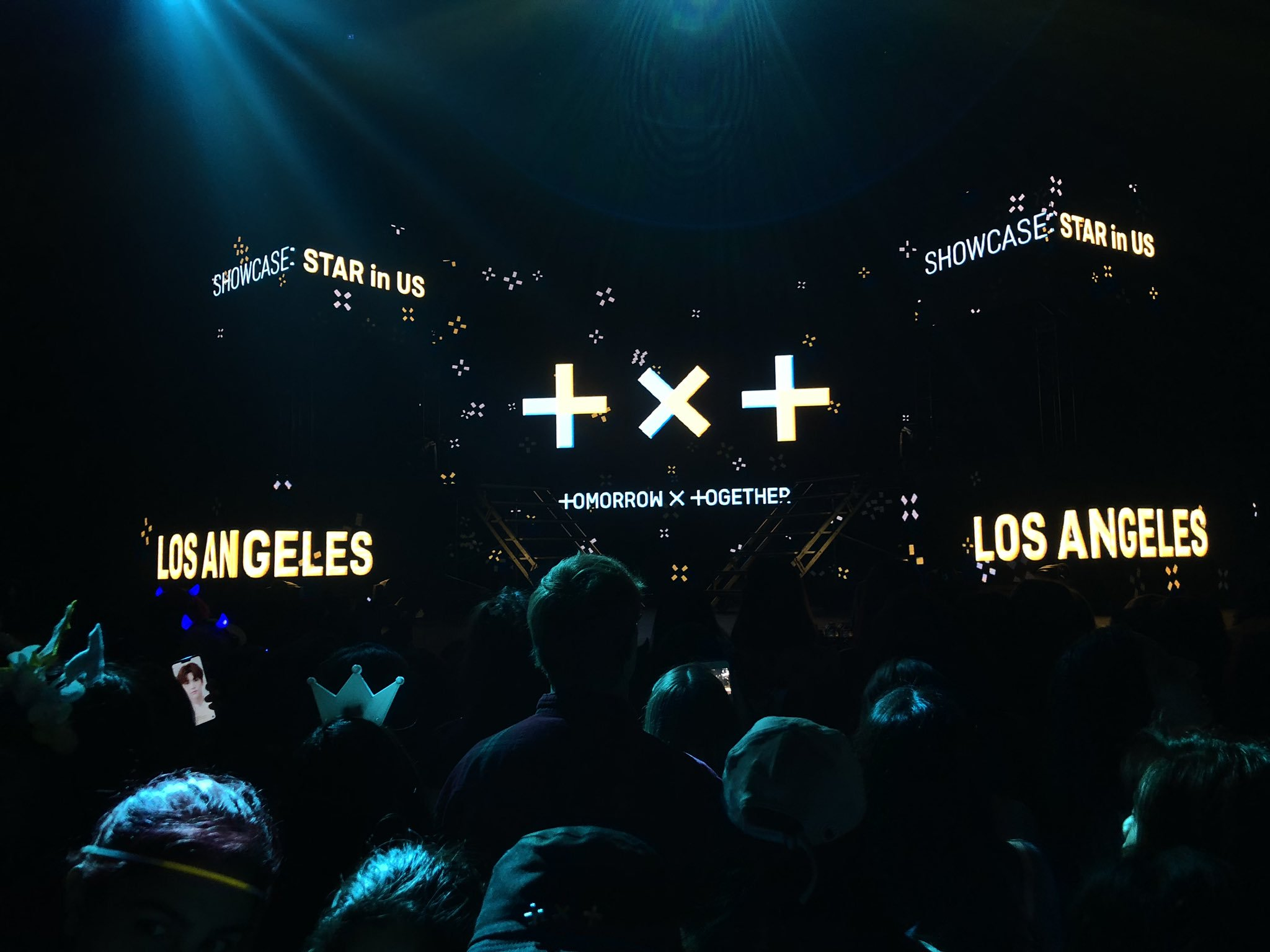
Tomorrow X Together debut showcase in Los Angeles.

On April 9, Tomorrow X Together announced their first overseas tour, a six-show debut showcase in six American cities—New York City, Chicago, Los Angeles, Dallas, Orlando, and Atlanta—over the course of two weeks, from May 9 to 24. Tickets to all shows sold out in less than 24 hours. Following their showcase in May, the band performed at the 2019 iHeartRadio Wango Tango music concert at Dignity Health Sports Park in Los Angeles on June 1.

On June 11, it was announced that Tomorrow X Together would be the first artist to join the new platform Weverse. On June 20, the band announced that they would be performing in two of Japan's largest fashion festivals, Kansai Collection's Autumn/Winter 2019 runway show on August 27, followed by the Tokyo Girls Collection's Autumn/Winter 2019 show on September 7, making them the first Korean artist to perform at both shows in the same season. On July 6, the band performed at the KCON 2019 NY music festival at Madison Square Garden, New York, in front of 55,000 spectators. Later that month, Tomorrow X Together received their first MTV Video Music Award nomination in the category of "Best K-pop".

On August 8, Big Hit Entertainment announced that plans to release a new album in August would be postponed to September due to Soobin's infectious conjunctivitis diagnosis and Yeonjun's back pain. On August 20, Big Hit Entertainment revealed members Taehyun and HueningKai had also been diagnosed with conjunctivitis, thus pushing the release date for the new album back from September to October.

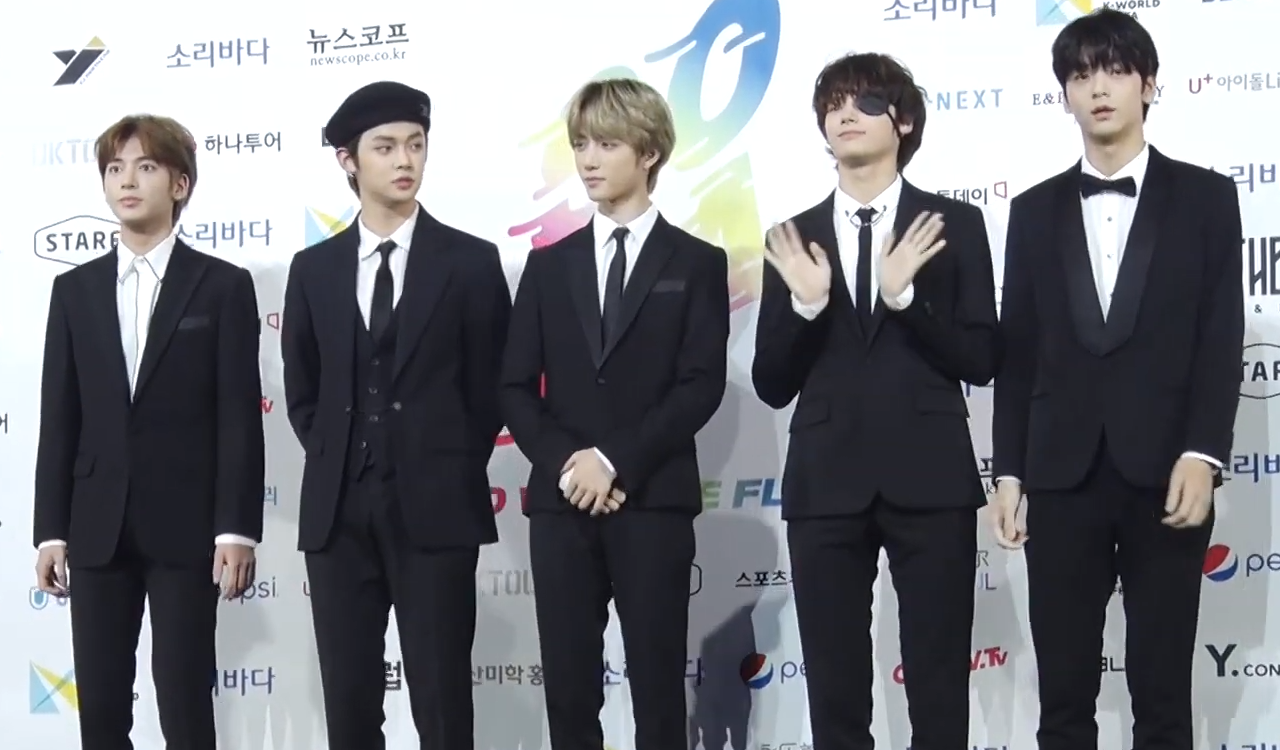
Tomorrow X Together at Soribada Best K-Music Awards on August 23, 2019.

On October 21, 2019, Tomorrow X Together released their first studio album, The Dream Chapter: Magic, with "9 and Three Quarters (Run Away)" as lead single. Musically, the album incorporated a variety of music genres, including R&B, tropical house, acoustic pop and hip-hop. The album debuted atop the Gaon Album Chart, surpassing 124,000 sales in its first week. This marked the band's second chart-topping album following their debut EP. The album debuted at number three on Billboard's World Albums Chart and at number six on the Billboard Heatseekers Album chart. A total of four tracks from the album entered the Billboard World Digital Songs chart, with the lead single debuting at number two. Billboard and Dazed both later named "9 and Three Quarters (Run Away)" one of the best K-pop songs of the year.

Tomorrow X Together's commercial success in their early months earned them several rookie awards at major Korean year-end music award shows, including the Asia Artist Awards, Melon Music Awards, Mnet Asian Music Awards, Golden Disc Awards, Gaon Chart Music Awards and Seoul Music Awards.

=== 2020: Japanese debut, The Dream Chapter: Eternity, and Minisode 1: Blue Hour ===
On January 15, 2020, Tomorrow X Together made their Japanese debut with the single "Magic Hour", which included the Japanese versions of their songs "Run Away", "Crown", and "Angel or Devil". The single album debuted at number one on the Oricon Daily Chart and at number two on the Oricon Weekly Singles Chart. On January 19, the band's Japanese television debut was announced with their first appearance on TV Asahi's Music Station. They performed the Japanese version of "Run Away" on January 24, the first Korean artist to perform on the show in 2020. "Magic Hour" was certified gold by the Recording Industry Association of Japan (RIAJ) for selling 100,000 units.

On April 28, Big Hit Entertainment set the release date of the band's second EP, The Dream Chapter: Eternity, for May 18, to be led by the single "Can't You See Me?". The EP sold over 181,000 units in its first week and entered the Gaon Album Chart at number two. It debuted at number one on the Oricon Albums Chart, becoming the band's first chart-topper in Japan. In July 2020, the EP received a platinum certification from the Korea Music Content Association (KMCA) for 250,000 album shipments, giving the Tomorrow X Together their first certification in the country since their debut. Two months later, The Dream Chapter: Star and The Dream Chapter: Magic were also certified platinum by the KMCA.

On July 20, 2020, it was announced that Soobin would be the new MC of KBS2's Music Bank for one year, along with Oh My Girl's Arin. His first broadcast as MC was on July 24, 2020, and his final on October 1, 2021. On August 19, 2020, Tomorrow X Together released their second Japanese single "Drama". The single album included Japanese versions of "Drama" and "Can't You See Me?", as well as their first original Japanese song, "Everlasting Shine". "Everlasting Shine" served as the twelfth opening theme of the anime Black Clover, which began airing on September 1. "Drama" debuted and peaked at number three on the Japanese Oricon Singles Chart and was certified gold by the RIAJ.

Tomorrow X Together released their third EP Minisode1: Blue Hour with the lead single "Blue Hour" on October 26. The album debuted at number three on the Gaon Album Chart, selling over 300,000 copies in its first week. In the United States, the EP debuted at number 25 on the Billboard 200, the top-selling album of the week. It also claimed the top spot on the Billboard World Albums chart, with Tomorrow X Together again topping the Emerging Artists chart. The EP also entered the Oricon Albums Chart at number one, becoming their second chart-topper in Japan. It was certified platinum by the KMCA. Tomorrow X Together released an original soundtrack titled "Your Light" for the JTBC teen-drama Live On on November 24, and member Yeonjun also made a cameo in the last episode.

=== 2021: Still Dreaming, The Chaos Chapter, and Chaotic Wonderland ===
The band's debut Japanese studio album Still Dreaming was released on January 20, 2021. The album included the original Japanese song "Force", which served as the opening theme for the second season of anime World Trigger. Still Dreaming debuted and peaked at number one on the Japanese Oricon Albums Chart and was certified gold by the RIAJ. The album charted at number 173 on the Billboard 200, making Tomorrow X Together the second Korean band in history to chart an album in Japanese on the US albums chart. In April 2021, Minisode1: Blue Hour was certified double platinum by the KMCA, indicating 500,000 shipments.

On April 22, 2021, BigHit Music announced that Tomorrow X Together would make a comeback at the end of May. The band released their second studio album, The Chaos Chapter: Freeze on May 31 with lead single "0X1=Lovesong (I Know I Love You)", featuring Seori. On May 7, it was announced that the album pre-orders had surpassed 520,000 copies in six days. On May 31, before the official release of the album, pre-orders increased to over 700,000 copies, more than doubling the pre-orders of their last release. The Chaos Chapter: Freeze debuted at number five on the Billboard 200, becoming the band's highest-charting album in the United States and the top-selling album that week. The album peaked at number one on the Oricon Albums Chart, becoming Tomorrow X Together's fourth consecutive chart-topper in Japan. On May 24, the band released the original soundtrack "Love Sight" for the tvN drama Doom At Your Service. On June 25, the band released a remix of "0X1=Lovesong (I Know I Love You)" featuring pH-1, Woodie Gochild and Seori. In July, The Chaos Chapter: Freeze was certified Gold by the RIAJ, marking Tomorrow X Together's first Korean release to be certified in Japan. In August, the album was certified triple platinum by the KMCA, indicating 750,000 shipments.

Tomorrow X Together released The Chaos Chapter: Fight or Escape, a repackaged version of The Chaos Chapter: Freeze, with lead single "Loser=Lover" on August 17, 2021. On October 3, the band held their first full-length concert, entitled Act: Boy. The concert ran for 150 minutes, featured 25 songs, and was streamed through online platform VenewLive to fans in 126 countries. On October 5, it was announced that each member would serve as guest DJs on KBS Cool FM's Kiss the Radio from October 25 to 31, hosting "Tomorrow x Together week" to "showcase their unique charms" following previous DJ Young K's military enlistment.

The band released their first Japanese EP, Chaotic Wonderland, on November 10, 2021. It contained Japanese versions of "0X1=Lovesong (I Know I Love You)" featuring Ikuta Lilas, vocalist of Japanese musical duo Yoasobi, and "MOA Diary (Dubaddu Wari Wari)", along with original Japanese song "Ito" and the group's first original English song "Magic". "Ito", composed by Japanese rock band Greeeen, served as the theme song for Japanese drama Spiral Labyrinth – DNA Forensic Investigation[ja], adapted from the manga of the same name.

On November 24, 2021, Tomorrow X Together was awarded the 2021 Men of the Year Pop Icon Award by GQ Japan. The band also featured on the cover of Euphoria magazine, where they spoke to Aedan Juvet about being named the "it group" of K-pop's fourth generation.

=== 2022: Minisode 2: Thursday's Child and first world tour ===
On February 23, 2022, "PS5" by Salem Ilese was released, featuring members Yeonjun and Taehyun. On March 14, it was announced that Yeonjun would be the new MC of SBS's Inkigayo alongside Roh Jeong-eui and Seo Bum-june.

Tomorrow X Together released their fourth EP, Minisode 2: Thursday's Child, and its lead single "Good Boy Gone Bad" on May 9. The EP surpassed 810,000 pre-ordered copies six days after the sales began. To support the EP, the group embarked on their first world tour, Act: Lovesick, beginning on July 2. On July 22, the group released an English single "Valley of Lies" featuring Puerto Rican rapper Iann Dior. On July 30, Tomorrow X Together became the first K-pop act to perform at Lollapalooza.

On August 31, the band's third Japanese single, "Good Boy Gone Bad" was released. It contained the Japanese version of "Good Boy Gone Bad" and two original Japanese songs, "Hitori no Yoru" and "Kimi janai dareka no (Ring)". "Ring" was used as the theme song for Abema's show Heart Signal Japan, a remake of the Korean reality show Heart Signal.

=== 2023: The Name Chapter: Temptation, second world tour and The Name Chapter: Freefall ===
The band released their fifth EP, The Name Chapter: Temptation, on January 27, 2023. On February 22, the band made available "Goodbye now" which served as the original soundtrack for the Webtoon Love Revolution. On March 22, Tomorrow X Together became the first K-pop group to headline at Lollapalooza, having performed the previous year. In March, the band embarked on their second world tour, Act: Sweet Mirage. On July 5, Tomorrow X Together released their second Japanese album, Sweet. The album included the original Japanese song "Ajisai no yōna koi (Hydrangea Love)" which served as the opening theme for the drama Saiko No Seito: Yomei Ichinen No Last Dance.

On July 7, the band released the single "Do It Like That" with the Jonas Brothers. In August, The Name Chapter: Temptation was certified Gold by the RIAA. It was Tomorrow X Together's first release to be certified in the United States. On September 15, the band released the single "Back For More" with Anitta, and the song was performed for the first time at the MTV Video Music Awards. On October 13, the band released their third Korean studio album, The Name Chapter: Freefall.

=== 2024: Minisode 3: Tomorrow and third world tour ===
For the opening theme of the 2024 anime television series Solo Leveling, the band collaborated with Japanese composer Hiroyuki Sawano on a song titled "LeveL". In March 2024, they announced their upcoming world tour Act: Promise. Initial dates for the tour include stops in South Korea and the US, and tickets for the US dates sold out after going on sale.

Tomorrow X Together released their sixth EP, Minisode 3: Tomorrow, on April 1, 2024. In July 2024, the music-themed Grammy Museum in Los Angeles, California announced that a special K-pop exhibit will take place in August 2024, displaying the accessories and performance gear worn by artists under Hybe, including Tomorrow X Together. On November 4, the band released their seventh EP, The Star Chapter: Sanctuary.

On December 10, it was announced that the group would go on a long-term break after the 39th Golden Disc Awards on January 5, 2025, to spend time with their families and rest, with plans to return later in the year. This came after leader Soobin had gone on a temporary hiatus due to health issues in November. Ten days later, the group announced the second part of the Act: Promise tour, taking the tour to Europe with additional stops in Asia. Venues were announced in January 2025, with the leg set to begin in March, following the conclusion of their previously announced hiatus.

=== 2025: The Star Chapter: Together, fourth world tour, contract renewals, and Starkissed ===
Tomorrow X Together released a digital single "Love Language" on May 2, and the fourth Korean-language studio album The Star Chapter: Together on July 21. To promote the album, the band embarked on their fourth world tour, Act: Tomorrow.

On August 23, all five members of Tomorrow X Together renewed their contracts with their agency. The announcement was shared through Weverse and was later mentioned during the opening concert of the group’s fourth world tour, Act: Tomorrow, held at Gocheok Sky Dome in Seoul.

At the end of the performance, leader Soobin read a handwritten letter thanking fans and explaining that the members had renewed their promise to continue going “longer and farther” together, from their debut through future stages of their career.

On October 20, Tomorrow X Together released their third Japanese-language studio album Starkissed.

=== 2026–present: 7th Year: A Moment of Stillness in the Thorns, fifth world tour, and Perfect Storm. ===
On March 1, 2026, on the final day of the Moa Con Concert at KSPO Dome, Tomorrow X Together announced their upcoming Korean EP; its title, 7th Year: A Moment of Stillness in the Thorns, was announced on Weverse shortly thereafter. While promoting 7th Year, Tomorrow X Together achieved their first "Grand Slam" on Korean music shows, winning Show Champion, M Countdown, Music Bank, Show! Music Core and Inkigayo. Tomorrow X Together released their ninth EP Perfect Storm on November 16. On November 13, Tomorrow X Together embarked on their fifth world tour, Steal the Wind at KSPO Dome. During the tour, the band previewed all six tracks from Perfect Storm.

== Members ==
- Yeonjun (연준)
- Soobin (수빈) – leader
- Beomgyu (범규)
- Taehyun (태현)
- Hueningkai (휴닝카이)

== Artistry ==
=== Musical style and lyrical themes ===
According to Rolling Stone, Tomorrow X Together's music "dabbles in disco, shoegaze, indie rock, and pop" and discusses "personal stories about the growing pains that come along with being a teenager". NME described the group's discography as mostly "bright, breezy and blissfully free from life's worries" and "focusing more on fantasy and fun". The members have expressed their desire to be more involved in songwriting. Complex noted that some fans had worried the group would adopt a more commercial sound after renewing their contracts with Big Hit Music in 2026, but cited "Stick with You" as evidence that they had stayed true to their roots, describing it as "stripped-back and personal, with an ethereal, half-awake atmosphere that mirrored the anxiety of its lyrics".

== Endorsements ==
In May 2019, Tomorrow X Together was announced as the new ambassadors for Korean skincare brand It's Skin. In December 2019, the band was announced as exclusive models for Korean student uniform brand Skoolooks' 2020 collections.

In February 2021, Tomorrow X Together was selected as "main characters" in TikTok's #BeMyValentine global campaign to celebrate Valentine's Day. In March 2021, the band was announced as models for the Japanese audio brand GLIDiC. In July 2021, the band was revealed to be the newest brand ambassadors of Philippine telecommunications giant Smart Communications for its "Build Your Own Giga" campaign. In August 2021, Tomorrow X Together was selected as models for Korean beauty brand 4OIN.

In May 2022, the band was announced as the global ambassadors for Korean skin care brand Ma:nyo factory.

In February 2023, Tomorrow X Together was appointed as the first global ambassador for the personal care brand Kundal. They were selected as the new global ambassadors for Korean beauty brand Clio in the same month. In August 2023, the band was announced as the new brand ambassadors for Dior.

In June 2025, Tomorrow X Together became the new brand ambassador for Dunkin' Philippines. In May 2026, the group was chosen as the first-ever global models for Yoajung, a popular premium dessert franchise in South Korea.

== Discography ==
Korean-language studio albums

- The Dream Chapter: Magic (2019)
- The Chaos Chapter: Freeze (2021)
- The Name Chapter: Freefall (2023)
- The Star Chapter: Together (2025)

Japanese-language studio albums

- Still Dreaming (2021)
- Sweet (2023)
- Starkissed (2025)

== Filmography ==
=== Television ===
Year	Title	Notes	Ref.
2019	One Dream.TXT	Reality show, 8 episodes	
2021	Playground	With Enhypen; Lunar New Year special variety show, 2 episodes	
2021	To Do X Tomorrow X Together	Variety show	

=== Online shows ===
Year	Title	Notes	Ref.
2019–present	Talk X Today	Reality show, 5 seasons	
2020–present	To Do X Tomorrow X Together	Variety show	
2019	Welcome Back Show	Comeback showcase on Mnet & M2	
2020	Weekly TXT	Japanese weekly reality show	
2020	Talk X Today Zero	Pre-debut reality show	
2020	Comeback Show: The Dream Chapter: Eternity	Comeback showcase on Mnet & M2	
2020	Comeback Show: Blue Hour	Comeback showcase on Mnet & M2	
2021	Tomorrow X Together: Map for "Still Dreaming"	Japanese documentary show on Still Dreaming preparation, 4 episodes	
2021	Smash. Restaurant	Japanese weekly variety show	
2021	Comeback Show: Freeze	Comeback showcase on Mnet & M2	
2022	Backstage	Special collaborative documentary with Enhypen	
2022	Smash. Villa	Japanese weekly variety show	
2022	Comeback Show: Thursday's Child	Comeback showcase on Mnet & M2	
2023	Tomorrow X Together: Our Lost Summer	Documentary available on Disney+	
2026	TXT's Parenting Diary	Variety show on Wavve	
2026	TOMORROW X TOGETHER's Should We Run Away?	Variety show on Mnet Plus	
2026	Tomorrow X Together Comeback Showcase: Perfect Storm	Comeback showcase on Mnet, M2 & Mnet Plus	

=== Radio shows ===
Year	Title	Notes	Ref.
2019	Tomorrow X Together Show	DJs	
2021	Listen	DJs	
2021	Kiss the Radio	DJs; October 25–31	

== Concerts and tours ==
=== Headlining tours ===
- Act: Lovesick (2022)
- Act: Sweet Mirage (2023)
- Act: Promise (2024–2025)
- Act: Tomorrow (2025–2026)
- Steal the Wind (2026-2027)

=== Concerts ===
Date	Title	City	Country	Venue/Network	Ref.
March 5, 2019	STAR in Seoul	Seoul	South Korea	Yes24 Live Hall	
May 9, 2019	SHOWCASE: STAR in US	New York	USA	Playstation Theater	
May 12, 2019	SHOWCASE: STAR in US	Chicago	USA	The Vic Theatre	
May 14, 2019	SHOWCASE: STAR in US	Orlando	USA	The Plaza Live	
May 17, 2019	SHOWCASE: STAR in US	Atlanta	USA	Center Stage Theater	
May 19, 2019	SHOWCASE: STAR in US	Dallas	USA	The Bomb Factory	
May 24, 2019	SHOWCASE: STAR in US	Los Angeles	USA	The Novo	
October 3, 2021	Act: Boy	Worldwide		VenewLive	

=== Concert participation ===
- 2021 New Year's Eve Live presented by Weverse
- 2022 Weverse Con [New Era]
- 2022 Lollapalooza
- 2022 Summer Sonic Festival
- 2023 Dick Clark's New Year's Rockin' Eve
- 2023 Weverse Con Festival
- 2023 Lollapalooza
