= Tomorrow X Together discography =

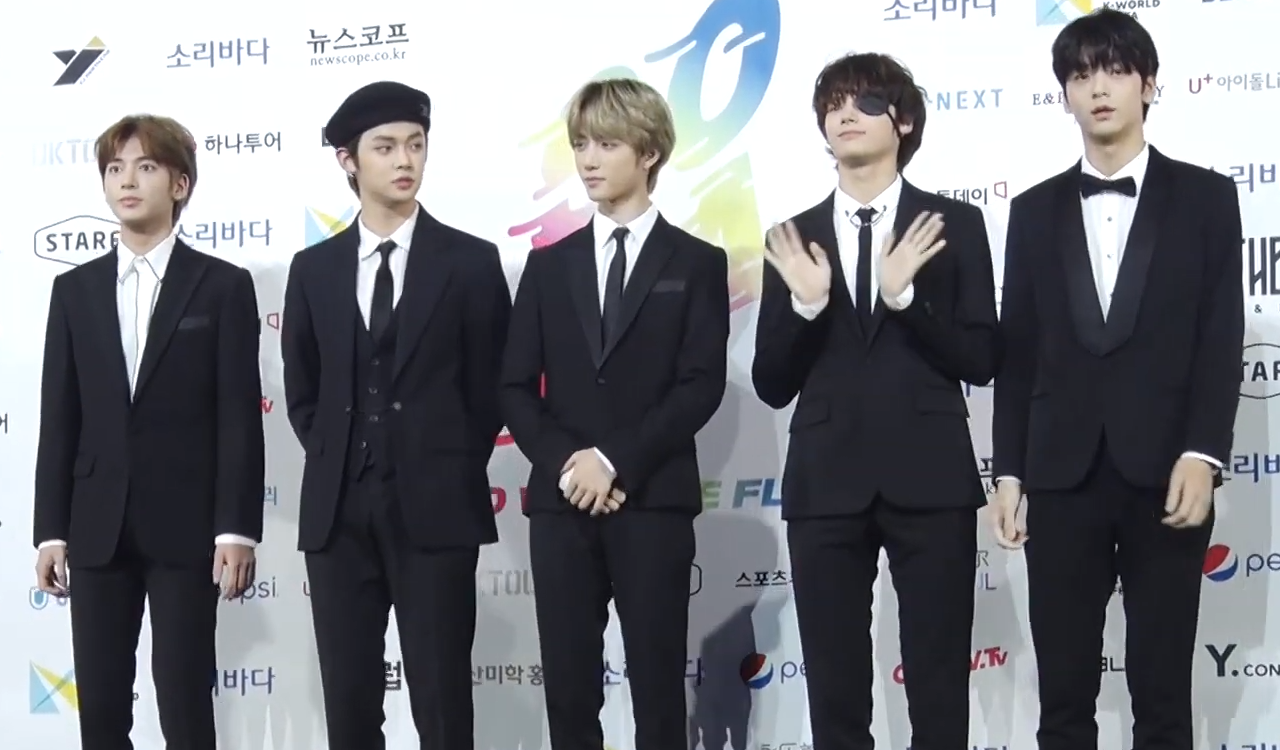
- Tomorrow X Together at the Soribada Best K-Music Awards in August 2019
- Studio albums: 7
- EPs: 7
- Singles: 30
- Music videos: 38
- Reissues: 1

South Korean boy band Tomorrow X Together, also known as TXT, has released seven studio albums, one reissue, seven extended plays, 30 singles—including seven soundtrack appearances—and 38 music videos. Per Gaon, the group is the 10th best-selling Korean act in history within the last decade, having sold over 3.3 million albums domestically as of November 2021.

Formed by Big Hit Entertainment, Tomorrow X Together made its debut in March 2019 with the extended play (EP) The Dream Chapter: Star, which debuted and peaked at number one on the South Korean Gaon Album Chart—it was certified platinum by the Korea Music Content Association (KMCA) in November 2020. The EP entered the Billboard 200 in the United States at number 140 as the highest-charting debut album by any male K-pop group at the time, and also achieved number-one on the World Albums chart, while its lead single "Crown" topped the World Digital Songs chart, making Tomorrow X Together the fastest K-pop group to appear on and simultaneously lead both World rankings. The group released its first studio album, The Dream Chapter: Magic, on October 21, 2019. The album sold more than 124,000 copies in its first week and became Tomorrow X Together's second number-one on the Gaon Album Chart. It was the group's first work to debut on Billboard's Heatseekers Albums chart, entering at number six. Four of the album's eight tracks entered the World Digital Songs chart—lead single "9 and Three Quarters (Run Away)" debuted at number two, while the other three songs charted at numbers 16, 18, and 21 respectively. The album received platinum certification from the KMCA in September 2020.

The group's first Japanese single "Magic Hour" was released on January 15, 2020. It debuted at number two on the weekly Oricon Singles Chart, and was eventually certified gold by the Recording Industry Association of Japan (RIAJ) for selling over 100,000 physical units. The group's second Korean-language EP, The Dream Chapter: Eternity, was released on May 18. Sales crossed 181,000 copies during the first week and the EP entered the Gaon Album Chart at number two. It was certified platinum by the KMCA in under two months, marking Tomorrow X Together's first certification in their home country since debut. The EP debuted at number one on the Oricon Albums Chart, giving the group its first chart-topper in Japan, and number four on the World Albums chart. The EP was the 28th best-selling record of 2020 in South Korea with over 358,000 copies sold. On August 19, the group's second Japanese single "Drama" was released. It debuted and peaked at number three on the Oricon Singles Chart and also received gold certification from the RIAJ. Tomorrow X Together released its third Korean-language EP, Minisode1: Blue Hour, on October 26. The EP exceeded domestic sales of over 300,000 copies in its first week and opened at number three on the Gaon Album Chart. It was certified platinum by the KMCA on December 10, and ended the year as the 19th best-selling record of 2020 in South Korea, having sold over 476,000 copies in just two months. It entered the Oricon Albums Chart in first place, and became the group's second number-one in Japan. In the US, it peaked atop the World Albums chart and debuted at number 25 on the Billboard 200, marking a new career high for the group as its first top-100 entry on the ranking.

On January 20, 2021, Tomorrow X Together released its first Japanese studio album, Still Dreaming. The album became the group's third consecutive number one on the Oricon Albums Chart—after The Dream Chapter: Eternity and Minisode1: Blue Hour—with first week sales exceeding 86,000 copies. It is the group's first album sell over 100,000 copies in Japan and its third release to earn gold certification from the RIAJ. Tomorrow X Together's second Korean studio album, The Chaos Chapter: Freeze, released on May 31, became the group's fourth number-one in South Korea, and its fourth consecutive number-one in Japan—it attained gold certification in June. The album's debut at number five on the Billboard 200 made it the highest-charting album of 2021 by a K-pop act at the time; Tomorrow X Together are the seventh K-pop act to enter the top five. It also marked the group's first top-10 entry and highest placement overall on the chart.

== Studio albums ==
List of studio albums, showing selected details, selected chart positions, sales figures, and certifications
Title	Details	Peak chart positions									Sales	Certifications
Title	Details	KOR	AUS	BEL (FL)	CAN	JPN	JPN Hot	SWI	US	US World	Sales	Certifications
The Dream Chapter: Magic	Released: October 21, 2019 (KOR); Label: Big Hit Entertainment, Republic Records; Formats: CD, digital download, streaming	1	— (Note: The Dream Chapter: Magic did not enter the ARIA Albums Chart, but peaked at number 22 on the ARIA Digital Album Chart.)	125	—	11	—	—	—	3	KOR: 512,816; JPN: 14,296; US: 2,000	KMCA: Platinum
Still Dreaming	Released: January 20, 2021 (JPN); Label: Big Hit, Universal Music Japan, Republic; Formats: CD, DVD, digital download, streaming	—	—	—	—	1	1	—	173	4	JPN: 108,188	RIAJ: Gold
The Chaos Chapter: Freeze	Released: May 31, 2021 (KOR); Label: Big Hit Music; Formats: CD, digital download, streaming	1	— (Note: The Chaos Chapter: Freeze did not enter the ARIA Albums Chart, but peaked at number 12 on the ARIA Digital Album Chart.)	17	49	1	1	15	5	1	KOR: 1,082,385; JPN: 184,528; US: 154,000	KMCA: Million; RIAJ: Gold
Sweet	Released: July 5, 2023 (JPN); Label: Big Hit, Universal, Republic; Formats: CD, DVD, digital download, streaming	—	—	—	—	1	1	78	54	3	JPN: 335,149	RIAJ: 2× Platinum
The Name Chapter: Freefall	Released: October 13, 2023 (KOR); Label: Big Hit, Republic; Formats: CD, digital download, streaming	1	31	14	63	1	1	12	3	1	KOR: 2,775,937; JPN: 277,009; US: 106,000; WW: 2,000,000	KMCA: 2× Million; RIAJ: Platinum
The Star Chapter: Together	Released: July 21, 2025 (KOR); Label: Big Hit, Republic; Formats: CD, digital download, streaming	1	—	28	—	1	1	86	3	1	KOR: 2,117,286; JPN: 427,013; US: 62,000	KMCA: Million; RIAJ: 2× Platinum
Starkissed	Released: October 20, 2025 (JPN); Label: Big Hit, Universal, Republic; Formats: CD, digital download, streaming	—	—	—	—	1	1	—	—	—	JPN: 337,197	RIAJ: 2× Platinum
"—" denotes releases that did not chart or were not released in that region.

== Reissues ==
List of reissues, showing selected details, selected chart positions, sales figures, and certifications
Title	Details	Peak chart positions			Sales	Certifications
Title	Details	KOR	BEL (FL)	JPN	Sales	Certifications
The Chaos Chapter: Fight or Escape	Released: August 17, 2021; Label: Big Hit Music; Formats: CD, digital download, streaming	1	4	2	KOR: 1,339,594	KMCA: Million

== Extended plays ==
List of extended plays, showing selected details, selected chart positions, sales figures, and certifications
Title	Details	Peak chart positions										Sales	Certifications
Title	Details	KOR	AUS	BEL (FL)	CAN	FRA	JPN	JPN Hot	SWI	US	US World	Sales	Certifications
The Dream Chapter: Star	Released: March 4, 2019 (KOR); Label: Big Hit Entertainment, Republic; Formats: CD, digital download, streaming	1	—	98	100	— (Note: The Dream Chapter: Star did not enter the Top Albums Chart, but peaked at number 11 on the component Digital chart.)	3	—	58	140	1	KOR: 433,968; JPN: 26,176; US: 4,000	KMCA: Platinum
The Dream Chapter: Eternity	Released: May 18, 2020 (KOR); Label: Big Hit, Republic; Formats: CD, digital download, streaming	2	—	92	—	—	1	—	—	—	4	KOR: 535,332; JPN: 38,814 (Phy.)	KMCA: 2× Platinum
Minisode1: Blue Hour	Released: October 26, 2020 (KOR); Label: Big Hit, Republic; Formats: CD, digital download, streaming	1	—	129	—	—	1	—	—	25	1	KOR: 1,028,937; JPN: 43,870 (Phy.); US: 18,000	KMCA: Million
Chaotic Wonderland	Released: November 10, 2021 (JPN); Label: Big Hit Music, Republic; Formats: CD, download, streaming	—	—	—	—	—	1	1	—	177	4	JPN: 188,864	RIAJ: Platinum
Minisode 2: Thursday's Child	Released: May 9, 2022 (KOR); Label: Big Hit, Republic; Formats: CD, digital download, streaming	1	—	14	44	9	1	1	14	4	1	KOR: 1,944,072; JPN: 180,289; US: 229,000	KMCA: Million; RIAJ: Gold
The Name Chapter: Temptation	Released: January 27, 2023 (KOR); Label: Big Hit, Republic; Formats: CD, digital download, streaming	1	—	5	15	3	1	1	7	1	1	KOR: 3,237,073; JPN: 219,199; US: 442,000	KMCA: 2× Million; KMCA: Platinum (Note: Weverse Albums version); RIAA: Gold; RIAJ: Platinum
Minisode 3: Tomorrow	Released: April 1, 2024; Label: Big Hit, Republic (KOR); Formats: CD, digital download, streaming	1	65	9	—	—	1	1	18	3	1	KOR: 1,963,289; JPN: 182,911; US: 193,000	KMCA: Million; RIAJ: Gold
The Star Chapter: Sanctuary	Released: November 4, 2024; Label: Big Hit, Republic (KOR); Formats: CD, digital download, streaming	1	—	47	—	26	1	1	35	2	1	KOR: 1,911,761; JPN: 435,402; US: 95,500	RIAJ: Platinum
7th Year: A Moment of Stillness in the Thorns	Released: April 13, 2026; Label: Big Hit, Republic (KOR); Formats: CD, digital download, streaming	1	59	22	—	—	1	2	—	3	1	KOR: 1,985,016; JPN: 229,996 (Phy.)	KMCA: Million; RIAJ: Platinum
Perfect Storm	Released: November 16, 2026; Label: Big Hit, Republic (KOR); Formats: CD, digital download, streaming	—	—	—	—	—	—	—	—	—	—	—	—
"—" denotes releases that did not chart or were not released in that region.

== Singles ==
=== As lead artist ===
==== Korean singles ====
List of Korean singles, showing year released, selected chart positions, sales figures, and name of the album
Title	Year	Peak chart positions										Sales	Certifications	Album
Title	Year	KOR	KOR Billb. (Note: includes the now defunct K-pop Hot 100 and the South Korea Songs charts)	CAN	JPN Cmb.	JPN Hot	NZ Hot	SGP	US Bub.	US World	WW	Sales	Certifications	Album
"Crown" (어느 날 머리에서 뿔이 자랐다)	2019	86	21	—	—	24	29	15	—	1	—			The Dream Chapter: Star
"Our Summer" (Acoustic mix)	2019	—	—	—	—	—	—	—	—	—	—			Non-album single
"9 and Three Quarters (Run Away)" (9와 4분의 3 승강장에서 너를 기다려)	2019	108	71	—	—	—	26	— (Note: "9 and Three Quarters (Run Away)" did not enter the RIAS International Top Charts, but peaked at number 13 on the Regional Top Charts.)	—	2	—	US: 2,000		The Dream Chapter: Magic
"Can't You See Me?" (세계가 불타버린 밤, 우린…)	2020	66	52	—	33	43	—	— (Note: "Can't You See Me?" did not enter the RIAS International Top Charts, but peaked at number 20 on the Regional Top Charts.)	—	2	—			The Dream Chapter: Eternity
"Blue Hour" (5시 53분의 하늘에서 발견한 너와 나)	2020	98	66	—	—	57	—	—	—	5	—		RIAA: Gold	Minisode1: Blue Hour
"Your Light" (Note: "Your Light" was released as a digital single on November 24, 2020.)	2020	—	—	—	—	—	—	—	—	—	—			Live On: Original Soundtrack
"Love Sight" (널 보면 시간이 멈춰 어느 순간에도)	2021	— (Note: "Love Sight" did not enter the Gaon Digital Chart, but peaked at number 42 on the component Download Chart.)	—	—	—	—	—	—	—	—	—			Doom at Your Service: Original Soundtrack
"0x1=Lovesong (I Know I Love You)" (featuring Seori)	2021	42	37	—	32	37	24	19	—	2	167		RIAA: Gold	The Chaos Chapter: Freeze
"Magic"	2021	—	—	—	—	—	—	—	—	13	—			The Chaos Chapter: Freeze
"Loser=Lover"	2021	76	88	—	40	56	—	19	—	6	184			The Chaos Chapter: Fight or Escape
"Eyes" (감은 눈을 떠봐) (Note: "Eyes" was released as the opening theme for the SBS animated series Armored Saurus and as a digital single on November 4, 2021.)	2021	— (Note: "Eyes" did not enter the Gaon Digital Chart, but peaked at number 190 on the component Download Chart.)	—	—	—	—	—	—	—	—	—			Non-album single
"Good Boy Gone Bad"	2022	58	—	—	22	—	28	15	—	7	186			Minisode 2: Thursday's Child
"Free Falling" (Note: "Free Falling" was released as a digital single on September 19, 2022.)	2022	— (Note: "Free Falling" did not enter the Circle Digital Chart, but peaked at number 67 on the component Download Chart.)	—	—	—	—	—	—	—	—	—			Non-album single
"Sugar Rush Ride"	2023	11	21	73	25	27	9	11	4	1	44			The Name Chapter: Temptation
"Goodbye Now" (이젠 안녕) (Note: "Goodbye Now" was released as a digital single on February 22, 2023, for the Webtoon series Love Revolution. It is a cover of the 1990's song of the same name by South Korean duo 015B.)	2023	76	—	—	—	—	—	—	—	—	—			Non-album single
"Chasing That Feeling"	2023	52	12	—	—	54	30	15	—	1	72	JPN: 1,299		The Name Chapter: Freefall
"Deja Vu"	2024	19	3	—	32	28	28	21	—	3	39	JPN: 2,853		Minisode 3: Tomorrow
"Over the Moon"	2024	22	18	—	24	30	—	— (Note: "Over the Moon" did not enter the RIAS Top Streaming Chart, but peaked at number 22 on the Top Regional Chart.)	—	3	195			The Star Chapter: Sanctuary
"Love Language"	2025	59	—	—	21	27	17	— (Note: "Love Language" did not enter the Official Singapore Chart, but peaked at number 20 on the Regional Chart.)	—	1	163			Non-album single
"When the Day Comes" (그날이 오면)	2025	18	—	—	—	—	—	—	—	—	—			Resident Playbook OST
"Beautiful Strangers"	2025	33	—	—	15	14	—	—	—	—	—			The Star Chapter: Together
"Stick with You" (하루에 하루만 더)	2026	3	—	—	16	14	33	—	—	6	— (Note: "Stick with You" did not enter the Billboard Global 200, but peaked at number 159 on the Global Excl. US.)			7th Year: A Moment of Stillness in the Thorns
"Angel Bite"	2026	—	—	—	—	—	29	—	—	—	—			Perfect Storm
"—" denotes releases that did not chart or were not released in that region.

==== Japanese singles ====
List of Japanese singles, showing year released, selected chart positions, sales figures, certifications, and name of the album
Title	Year	Peak chart positions			Sales	Certifications	Album
Title	Year	JPN	JPN Cmb.	JPN Hot	Sales	Certifications	Album
"9 and Three Quarters (Run Away)" (Japanese version)	2019	2	2	4	JPN: 101,298 (Phy.)	RIAJ: Gold	Still Dreaming
"Drama" (Japanese version) (Note: The Japanese version of "Drama" was pre-released on August 7, 2020, as a digital single. It was included as the title track on TXT's second Japanese single "Drama", released on August 19.)	2020	3	3	4	JPN: 95,997 (Phy.)	RIAJ: Gold	Still Dreaming
"Everlasting Shine" (永遠に光れ) (Note: "Everlasting Shine" was included as the second track on TXT's second Japanese single "Drama" released on August 19, 2020. It also served as the opening theme for Black Clover season 3.)	2020	—	—	—			Still Dreaming
"Force" (Note: "Force" was pre-released as a digital single on January 9, 2021, as the opening theme for World Trigger season 2.)	2021	—	45	50 (Note: "Force" also debuted on the Billboard Japan Hot Animation chart at number 10.)			Still Dreaming
"Blue Hour" (Japanese version)	2021	—	—	—			Still Dreaming
"Ito" (Note: "Ito" was originally released as a digital single on November 3, 2021, as the opening theme for the TV Tokyo drama series Spiral Labyrinth – DNA Forensic Investigation.)	2021	—	36	53			Chaotic Wonderland
"0x1=Lovesong (I Know I Love You)" (Japanese version)	2021	—	42	—			Chaotic Wonderland
"Good Boy Gone Bad" (Japanese version)	2022	2	2	3	JPN: 442,596 (Phy.)	RIAJ: 2× Platinum	Sweet
"Ring" (君じゃない誰かの愛し方) (Note: "Ring" was pre-released as a digital single on August 24, 2022. It was included as the second track on TXT's third Japanese single "Good Boy Gone Bad" released on August 31.)	2022	—	47	53			Sweet
"Sugar Rush Ride" (Japanese version)	2023	—	—	—			Sweet
"Hydrangea Love" (紫陽花のような恋) (Note: "Hydrangea Love" was pre-released as a digital single on July 1, 2023, as the opening theme for the NTV drama series The Best Student: Last Dance with 1 Year to Live (最高の生徒 ～余命1年のラストダンス～.)	2023	—	47	51			Sweet
"We'll Never Change" (ひとつの誓い) (Note: "We'll Never Change" was released on July 3, 2024, JST as the lead single from TXT's fourth Japanese single Chikai.)	2024	1	1	2	JPN: 518,006 (Phy.)	RIAJ: 3× Platinum	Starkissed
"Step by Step"	2025	—	—	48			Starkissed
"Beautiful Strangers" (Japanese version)	2025	—	—	—	JPN: 2,835 (Dig.)		Starkissed
"Can't Stop"	2025	—	18	12	JPN: 3,167 (Dig.)		Starkissed
"Where Do You Go?"	2025	—	—	49			Starkissed
"SSS (Sending Secret Signals)" (featuring Hyde)	2026	—	39	44			Non-album singles
"Setsuna Hanabi" (セツナハナビ)	2026	2	2	1	JPN: 336,328 (Phy.)	RIAJ: Platinum	Non-album singles
"—" denotes releases that did not chart or were not released in that region.

==== English singles ====
List of English singles, showing year released, selected chart positions, sales figures, and name of the album
Title	Year	Peak chart positions								Sales	Album
Title	Year	KOR	CAN Dig.	JPN Dig.	JPN DL	NZ Hot	SGP Reg.	US Bub.	WW	Sales	Album
"Cat & Dog" (English version) (Note: "Cat & Dog" was originally released in Korean and later on in English. As such, it is not considered the group's first English-language single.)	2019	—	—	—	—	—	—	—	—		Non-album single
"PS5" (Salem Ilese with Tomorrow X Together featuring Alan Walker)	2022	170	—	—	—	38	—	—	—		Unsponsored Content
"Valley of Lies" (with Iann Dior)	2022	— (Note: "Valley of Lies" did not enter the Circle Digital Chart, but peaked at number 101 on the component Download Chart.)	—	—	—	36	—	—	—		Non-album single
"Do It Like That" (with Jonas Brothers)	2023	136	13	28	20	9	20	— (Note: "Do It Like That" did not enter the Bubbling Under Hot 100, but peaked at number three on the Digital Song Sales chart.)	88	JPN: 2,711	The Name Chapter: Freefall
"Back for More" (with Anitta) (Note: The solo version of "Back for More", without Anitta, is included on The Name Chapter: Freefall.)	2023	— (Note: "Back for More" did not enter the Circle Digital Chart, but peaked at number 26 on the component Download Chart.)	—	27	—	19	12	11	37	JPN: 1,864	Non-album single
"—" denotes releases that did not chart or were not released in that region.

=== As featured artist ===
List of featured singles, showing year released, selected chart positions, sales figures, and name of the album
Title	Year	Peak position		Sales	Album
Title	Year	JPN	JPN Dig.	Sales	Album
"Level" (SawanoHiroyuki[nZK] featuring Tomorrow x Together) (Note: "Level" was released as a digital single on January 7, 2024, as the opening theme for the animated series Solo Leveling.)	2024	24	46	JPN: 3,558	Non-album single

=== Promotional singles ===
List of promotional singles, showing year released, selected chart positions, sales figures, and name of the album
Title	Year	Peak position	Sales	Album
Title	Year	JPN Dig.	Sales	Album
"Open Always Wins"	2024	22	JPN: 2,447	Non-album single

== Other charted songs ==
List of other charted songs, showing year released, selected chart positions, and name of the album
Title	Year	Peak chart positions					Album
Title	Year	KOR	KOR Billb.	NZ Hot	RUS Stream.	US World	Album
"Blue Orangeade"	2019	—	—	—	*	10	The Dream Chapter: Star
"Our Summer"	2019	—	—	—	*	17	The Dream Chapter: Star
"Cat & Dog"	2019	—	—	—	*	14	The Dream Chapter: Star
"New Rules"	2019	—	100	—	*	16	The Dream Chapter: Magic
"20cm"	2019	—	—	—	*	18	The Dream Chapter: Magic
"Angel or Devil"	2019	—	—	—	*	21	The Dream Chapter: Magic
"Fairy of Shampoo" (샴푸의 요정)	2020	—	94	—	*	12	The Dream Chapter: Eternity
"Maze in the Mirror" (거울 속의 미로)	2020	—	—	—	*	18	The Dream Chapter: Eternity
"Puma" (동물원을 빠져나온 퓨마)	2020	—	—	—	*	16	The Dream Chapter: Eternity
"Eternally"	2020	—	—	—	*	14	The Dream Chapter: Eternity
"Ghosting"	2020	—	—	—	*	23	Minisode1: Blue Hour
"Wishlist"	2020	—	—	—	*	25	Minisode1: Blue Hour
"Anti-Romantic"	2021	—	—	—	*	8	The Chaos Chapter: Freeze
"MOA Diary (Dubaddu Wari Wari)" (교환일기 (두밧두 와리와리)	2021	167	—	—	*	13	The Chaos Chapter: Fight or Escape
"Opening Sequence"	2022	—	—	—	*	15	Minisode 2: Thursday's Child
"Devil by the Window"	2023	65	—	23	*	4	The Name Chapter: Temptation
"Happy Fools" (featuring Coi Leray)	2023	86	—	—	*	8	The Name Chapter: Temptation
"Tinnitus (Wanna Be a Rock)" (돌멩이가 되고 싶어)	2023	84	—	17	*	6	The Name Chapter: Temptation
"Farewell, Neverland" (네버랜드를 떠나며)	2023	79	—	29	*	7	The Name Chapter: Temptation
"Growing Pain"	2023	—	—	—	*	7	The Name Chapter: Freefall
"Dreamer"	2023	—	—	—	*	9	The Name Chapter: Freefall
"Deep Down"	2023	—	—	—	*	10	The Name Chapter: Freefall
"Blue Spring"	2023	—	—	—	90	8	The Name Chapter: Freefall
"I'll See You There Tomorrow" (내일에서 기다릴게)	2024	78	21	—	*	—	Minisode 3: Tomorrow
"Miracle" (기적은 너와 내가 함께하는 순간마다 일어나고 있어)	2024	145	—	—	*	—	Minisode 3: Tomorrow
"The Killa (I Belong to You)"	2024	194	—	—	*	—	Minisode 3: Tomorrow
"Quarter Life"	2024	189	—	—	*	—	Minisode 3: Tomorrow
"Heaven"	2024	156	—	—	*	—	The Star Chapter: Sanctuary
"Ghost Girl" (Yeonjun solo)	2025	76	—	—	—	—	The Star Chapter: Together
"Sunday Driver" (Soobin solo)	2025	101	—	—	—	—	The Star Chapter: Together
"Take My Half" (Beomgyu solo)	2025	147	—	—	—	—	The Star Chapter: Together
"—" denotes a recording that did not chart or was not released in that territory. "*" denotes that the chart did not exist at that time.

== Videography ==
Key
†	Denotes music videos certified by Big Hit as part of the TXT Universe (Note: later dubbed The Star Seekers with Tomorrow X Together)

=== Music videos ===
List of music videos, showing year released, other credited artist(s), director(s), and additional notes
Title	Year	Other performer(s) credited	Director(s) (Note: Director credits are only included if mentioned by a reliable secondary source.)	Description	Ref.
"Crown"	2019	None	Oui Kim	Debut MV	
"Crown (Choreography version)"	2019	None	Oui Kim	Performance video	
"Blue Orangeade"	2019	None	Kim Ja Kyoung	Lyric video	
"Cat & Dog"	2019	None	Lumpens		
"Cat & Dog (English version)"	2019	None	Undermood Film		
"Nap of a Star"†	2019	None	Digipedi		
"Our Summer (Selfie version)"	2019	None			
"Run Away"	2019	None	Oui Kim, Choi Yongseok (Lumpens)		
"Magic Island"†	2019	None	Wonmo Seong (Digipedi)		
"Angel or Devil"	2019	None	Kim Ja Kyoung (Flexible Pictures)		
"Run Away (Japanese version)"	2020	None	Kim Ja Kyoung (Flexible Pictures)	Japanese debut MV	
"Can't You See Me?"	2020	None	Oui Kim		
"Puma"	2020	None	Guzza (Lumpens)		
"Eternally"†	2020	None	Wonmo Seong (Digipedi)		
"Drama (Japanese version)"	2020	None	Ko Yoojeong		
"Blue Hour"	2020	None	Guzza (Lumpens)		
"Blue Hour (Choreography version)"	2020	None	Guzza (Lumpens)	Performance video	
"We Lost The Summer"	2020	None	Nuri Jeong (Cosmo)		
"Blue Hour (Japanese version)"	2021	None	Wonmo Seong (Digipedi)		
"Way Home (Eye Contact version)"	2021	None	Choi Byung Ju(Gongjang)		
"0x1=Lovesong (I Know I Love You)"	2021	Seori	Guzza (Lumpens), Yong Seok Choi		
"0x1=Lovesong (I Know I Love You)" (Choreography version)	2021	Seori	Guzza (Lumpens), Yong Seok Choi	Performance video	
"Magic"	2021	None	Hobin (aHOBINfilm)		
"Loser=Lover"	2021	None	Guzza (Lumpens)		
"Loser=Lover" (Choreography version)	2021	None	Guzza (Lumpens)	Performance video	
"Frost"†	2021	None	Via (Jimmy)		
"0x1=Lovesong (I Know I Love You)" (Japanese version)	2021	Ikuta Lilas	Seong Wonmo (Digipedi)		
"Good Boy Gone Bad"	2022	None	Kwon Yong Soo		
"Valley of Lies"	2022	Iann Dior		Animated visualizer of a blonde-haired figure walking through a sunny park then a desert canyon as meteors fall from the sky. After a period of walking in darkness, the figure ascends into the clouds and sees shooting stars. The figure continues walking after descending to Earth. Neither artist appear in the video, but both are heard singing in its audio.	
"Good Boy Gone Bad" (Japanese version)	2022	None	2ee Hyein		
"Free Falling"	2022	None	Sun Lee	Shows various animated scenes from the band's Star Seekers webtoon, featuring characters based on the band members, set to the song's audio.	
"Sugar Rush Ride"	2023	None	Kwon Yong Soo	The band wake up on the shore of an island and explore a mysterious forest located within. They try to avoid several temptations that appear before them in the forest. The video's choreography scenes include high kicks, lifts, and controlled movements meant to physically reflect changes in the music tempo.	
"Sugar Rush Ride" (Japanese version)	2023	None	Shin Heewon		
"Do It Like That"	2023	Jonas Brothers	Yongsoo Kwon	Both bands sing the song individually and together on a white soundstage. TXT perform choreography for the song during their verse.	
"Back for More"	2023	Anitta	Mother Media	TXT perform the song and accompanying choreography backstage at a theatre then on the main stage where they are joined by Anitta and backup dancers.	
"Chasing That Feeling"	2023	None	Christian Breslauer	Filmed on a set reminiscent of the streets of New York, the band members display superhuman abilities while chasing individual colored, flaming orbs of light through the cityscape, which twists and contorts around them, until they are reunited at the end.	
"Deja Vu"	2024	None	Yu Kwang Goeng	The band members are caught in "different, trippy dimensions" and must "overcom[e] individual trials" in order to maintain their connection to one another.	
"We'll Never Change"	2024	None	Jinyu	A bright ball of light moves across the screen and enters Beomgyu's eye. Scenes of the band members gazing "wistfully into the distance" while in various places such as a gym, a banquet hall, and an office, are shown among flashbacks of happy moments the fivesome shared together. At the end, the ball of the light leaves Beomgyu's eye and dissipates.	
"Kitto Zutto"	2024	None	Akari Maru (rhythmos)		
"Over the Moon"	2024	None	Yunah Sheep		
"Love Language"	2025	None	Kwon Yong-soo		
"Beautiful Strangers"	2025	None	Byul Yun		
"(Yeonjun) Ghost Girl"	2025	None	Min Soo Park		
"(Soobin) Sunday Driver"	2025	None	Vin Kim		
"(HueningKai) Dance With You"	2025	None	Lee Jaedon		
"(Beomgyu) Take My Half"	2025	None	HOBIN		
"(Taehyun) Bird of Night"	2025	None	Hyungrok Kang		
"Can't Stop"	2025	None	ZUAE		
"Where Do You Go"	2025	None	MESS		
"SSS (Sending Secret Signals"	2026	HYDE	Junpei Komuro		
"Stick With You"	2026	None	Hangyeol Lee		
"Setsuna Hanabi"	2026	None	Woogie Kim		
"Angel Bite"	2026	None	DQM		

=== Other videos ===
Title	Year	Director	Ref.
"The Dream Chapter: Magic Concept Trailer"	2019	YongSeok Choi (Lumpens)	
"The Dream Chapter: Eternity Concept Trailer"	2020	Wonmo Seong	
"The Chaos Chapter: Freeze Concept Trailer"	2021	Guzza (Lumpens)	
"The Name Chapter Concept Trailer"	2022	Yong Seok Choi (Lumpens)	
"minisode 3: TOMORROW Concept Trailer"	2024	Yu Kwang Goeng	
"The Star Chapter: TOGETHER Concept Trailer"	2025	Show Yanagisawa	
"7TH YEAR: A Moment of Stillness in the Thorns PRELUDE"	2026	Jan Lee	
"PERFECT STORM: STORM IS COMING"	2026	DQM	

=== DVD ===
Title	Album details	Peak chart positions	Sales
Title	Album details	JPN	Sales
Tomorrow X Together 2020 Season's Greetings	Released: December 5, 2019; Label: Big Hit; Format: DVD	—	—N/a
H:our : The First Photobook	Released: January 28, 2020; Label: Big Hit; Format: DVD + Photobook	—	—N/a
H:our : The Second Photobook	Released: September 23, 2020; Label: Big Hit; Format: DVD + Photobook	—	—N/a
Tomorrow X Together 2021 Season's Greetings	Released: December 16, 2020; Label: Big Hit; Format: DVD	4	JPN: 7,657
Tomorrow X Together Memories: First Story	Released: February 1, 2021; Label: Big Hit; Format: DVD + Photobook	2	JPN: 10,529
2021 TXT Fanlive Shine X Together	Released: July 21, 2021; Label: Hybe; Format: DVD	3	JPN: 8,902
H:our : The Third Photobook and H:our+ : Photobook Extended Edition with Comments	Released: September 23, 2021; Label: Hybe; Format: DVD + Photobook	—	—N/a
Tomorrow X Together 2022 Season's Greetings	Released: December 10, 2021; Label: Hybe; Format: Digital video (Note: accessible via Weverse)	—	—N/a
Tomorrow X Together Memories: Second Story	Released: April 27, 2022; Label: Hybe; Format: DVD/Digital video + Photobook	2	JPN: 11,705
Season of TXT: Midsummer	Released: September 2, 2022; Label: Hybe; Format: Digital video + Photobook	—	—N/a
Tomorrow X Together 2023 Season's Greetings	Released: December 22, 2022; Label: Hybe; Format: Digital video	—	—N/a
Tomorrow X Together Memories: Third Story	Released: April 14 & 21, 2023; Label: Hybe; Format: Digital video/DVD + Photobook	4	JPN: 7,719
Tomorrow X Together World Tour Act: Love Sick In Seoul	Released: May 30 & June 9, 2023; Label: Hybe; Format: Digital video/DVD + Photobook	8	JPN: 1,987
Act: Love Sick In Japan	Released: June 28, 2023; Label: Hybe; Format: Digital video/DVD + Photobook	3	JPN: 14,753

== See also ==
- List of songs recorded by Tomorrow X Together
