= List of awards and nominations received by Tomorrow X Together =

Tomorrow X Together awards and nominations
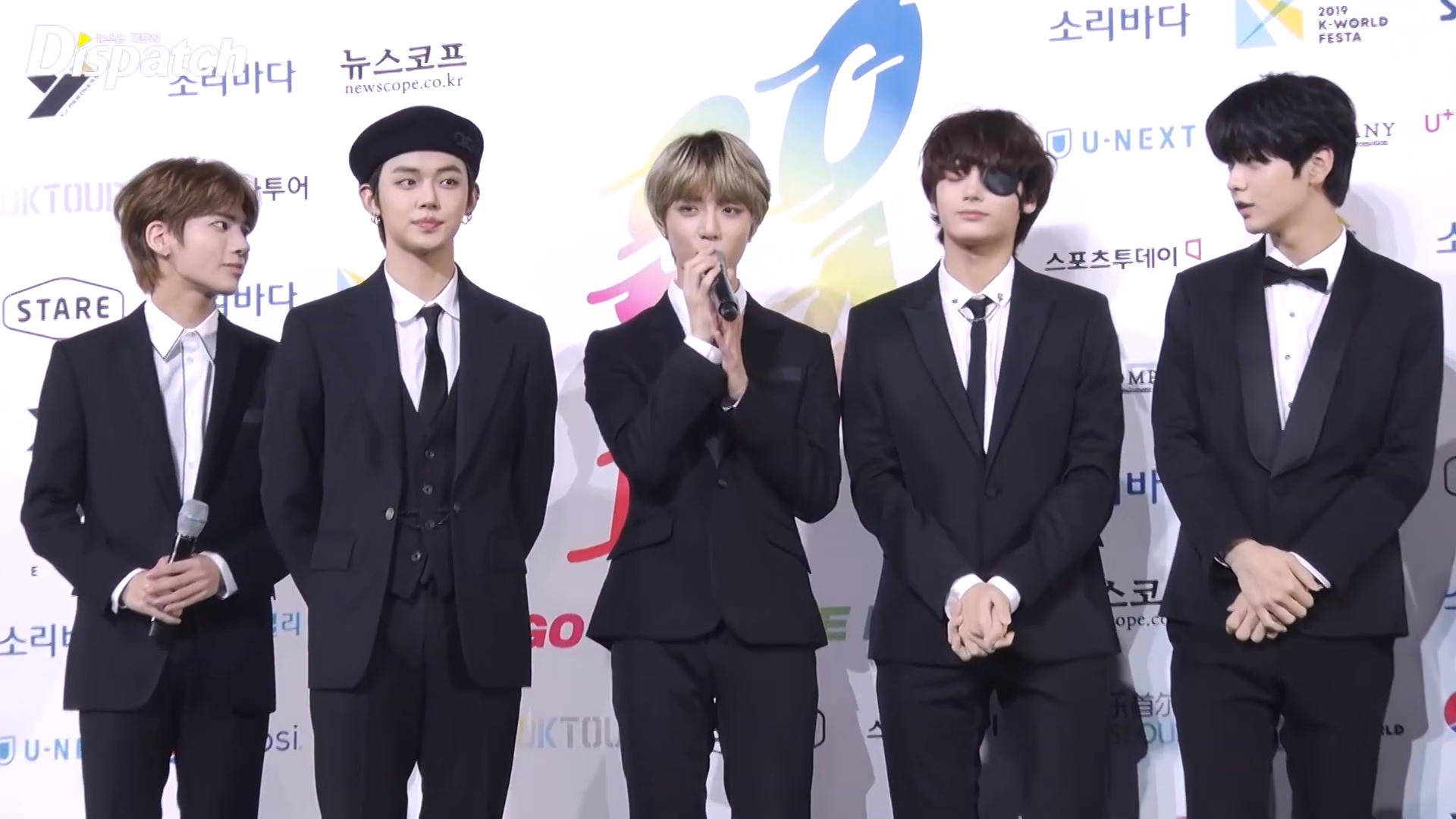
- Tomorrow X Together at Soribada Awards on August 23, 2019
Awards and nominations
Award	Wins	Nominations
American Music Awards	0	2
Asia Artist Awards	1	4
Asia Star Entertainer Awards	4	4
Asian Pop Music Awards	1	3
Billboard Music Awards	0	5
Brand Customer Loyalty Award	0	1
Brand of the Year Awards	2	2
Bravo Otto	0	1
Circle Chart Music Awards	3	10
Genie Music Awards	1	4
Golden Disc Awards	7	19
Hanteo Music Awards	6	12
Japan Gold Disc Award	2	2
Japan Record Awards	1	1
K-World Dream Awards	2	3
KBS Entertainment Awards	1	1
Korean Music Awards	0	2
KM Chart Awards (KMA)	4	4
MAMA Awards	10	43
Melon Music Awards	3	12
MTV Europe Music Awards	2	4
MTV MIAW Awards	0	2
MTV Video Music Awards	1	8
Music Awards Japan	0	1
Nickelodeon Mexico Kids' Choice Awards	0	3
NME Awards	1	2
People's Choice Awards	0	1
Seoul Music Awards	5	29
Soribada Best K-Music Awards	2	6
Spotify Awards	0	1
The Fact Music Awards	4	5
V Live Awards	1	2

Totals (Note: Certain award groups do not simply award one winner. They acknowledge several different recipients, have runners-up, and have third place. Since this is a specific recognition and is different from losing an award, runner-up mentions are considered wins in this award tally. For simplification and to avoid errors, each award in this list has been presumed to have had a prior nomination.)
- Wins: 64
- Nominations: 195

Tomorrow X Together, a South Korean boy band formed by Big Hit Music consisting of five members: Yeonjun, Soobin, Beomgyu, Taehyun, and HueningKai, debuted in 2019. The band earned several new artist of the year awards including Rookie of the Year at the 34th Golden Disc Awards and the 2019 Melon Music Awards, New Artist of the Year - Album at the 9th Gaon Chart Music Awards and Best New Male Artist at the 2019 Mnet Asian Music Awards.

== Awards and nominations ==
Name of the award ceremony, year presented, award category, nominee(s) of the award, and the result of the nomination
Award ceremony	Year	Category	Nominee(s) / Work(s)	Result	Ref.
American Music Awards	2022	Favorite K-Pop Artist	TXT	Nominated	
American Music Awards	2026	Best Male K-Pop Artist	TXT	Nominated	
Asia Artist Awards	2019	Rookie of the Year (Music)	TXT	Won	
Asia Artist Awards	2019	Popularity Award	TXT	Nominated	
Asia Artist Awards	2021	Male Idol Group Popularity Award	TXT	Nominated	
Asia Artist Awards	2026	Popularity Award – Group (Male)	TXT	Pending	
Asia Star Entertainer Awards	2024	Artist of the Year (Daesang)	TXT	Won	
Asia Star Entertainer Awards	2024	The Best Performance Award – Group	TXT	Won	
Asia Star Entertainer Awards	2024	Global K-Pop Leader Award	TXT	Won	
Asia Star Entertainer Awards	2024	The Platinum Award	TXT	Won	
Asian Pop Music Awards (Note: Hosted by the Hong Kong Asia Pacific International Group and Sunway Records, the Asian Pop Music Awards bases its winners on the "Asian Pop Music Chart" which opened in September 2019.)	2024	Top 20 Albums of the Year (Overseas)	Minisode 3: Tomorrow	Won	
Asian Pop Music Awards	2024	Best Dance Performance (Overseas)	"Deja Vu"	Nominated	
Asian Pop Music Awards	2024	Best Group (Overseas)	TXT	Nominated	
Billboard Music Awards	2023	Top Global K-Pop Artist	TXT	Nominated	
Billboard Music Awards	2023	Top K-Pop Album	The Name Chapter: Temptation	Nominated	
Billboard Music Awards	2024	Top Global K-Pop Artist	TXT	Nominated	
Billboard Music Awards	2024	Top K-Pop Album	The Name Chapter: Freefall	Nominated	
Billboard Music Awards	2024	Top K-Pop Touring Artist	TXT	Nominated	
Brand Customer Loyalty Awards	2021	Hot Trend Male Idol Group	TXT	Nominated	
Brand of the Year Awards	2019	Male Rookie Idol of the Year	TXT	Won	
Brand of the Year Awards	2021	Rising Star Male Idol	TXT	Won	
Bravo Otto	2019	Best K-Pop	TXT	Nominated	
Circle Chart Music Awards	2020	New Artist of the Year – Album	TXT	Won	
Circle Chart Music Awards	2020	New Artist of the Year – Digital	TXT	Nominated	
Circle Chart Music Awards	2020	Album of the Year – 1st Quarter	The Dream Chapter: Star	Nominated	
Circle Chart Music Awards	2021	MuBeat Global Choice Award – Male	TXT	Nominated	
Circle Chart Music Awards	2022	Album of the Year – 2nd Quarter	The Chaos Chapter: Freeze	Nominated	
Circle Chart Music Awards	2023	World K-Pop Star	TXT	Won	
Circle Chart Music Awards	2023	Album of the Year – 2nd Quarter	Minisode 2: Thursday's Child	Nominated	
Circle Chart Music Awards	2023	Song of the Year – May	"Good Boy Gone Bad"	Nominated	
Circle Chart Music Awards	2023	Song of the Year – May	"Opening Sequence"	Nominated	
Circle Chart Music Awards	2024	Artist of the Year – Album	The Name Chapter: Freefall	Won	
Genie Music Awards	2019	Best New Male Artist	TXT	Won	
Genie Music Awards	2019	Genie Music Popularity Award	TXT	Nominated	
Genie Music Awards	2019	Global Popularity Award	TXT	Nominated	
Genie Music Awards	2019	Top Artist Award	TXT	Nominated	
Golden Disc Awards	2020	Rookie Artist of the Year	TXT	Won	
Golden Disc Awards	2020	TikTok Golden Disc Most Popular Artist	TXT	Nominated	
Golden Disc Awards	2020	Disc Bonsang	The Dream Chapter: Magic	Nominated	
Golden Disc Awards	2021	Curaprox Popularity Award	TXT	Nominated	
Golden Disc Awards	2021	QQ Music Popularity Award	TXT	Nominated	
Golden Disc Awards	2021	Disc Bonsang	The Dream Chapter: Eternity	Won	
Golden Disc Awards	2021	Disc Daesang	The Dream Chapter: Eternity	Nominated	
Golden Disc Awards	2022	Disc Bonsang	The Chaos Chapter: Freeze	Won	
Golden Disc Awards	2022	Disc Daesang	The Chaos Chapter: Freeze	Nominated	
Golden Disc Awards	2022	Seezn Most Popular Artist Award	TXT	Nominated	
Golden Disc Awards	2023	Indonesia Fans Choice Award	TXT	Won	
Golden Disc Awards	2023	Album Bonsang	The Name Chapter: Temptation	Won	
Golden Disc Awards	2023	Album Daesang	The Name Chapter: Temptation	Nominated	
Golden Disc Awards	2024	Album Bonsang	The Star Chapter: Sanctuary	Won	
Golden Disc Awards	2024	Album Daesang	The Star Chapter: Sanctuary	Nominated	
Golden Disc Awards	2024	Most Popular Artist – Male	TXT	Nominated	
Golden Disc Awards	2025	Album Bonsang	The Star Chapter: Together	Won	
Golden Disc Awards	2025	Album Daesang (Album of the Year)	The Star Chapter: Together	Nominated	
Golden Disc Awards	2025	Most Popular Artist – Male	TXT	Nominated	
Hanteo Music Awards	2023	Global Artist Award – Asia	TXT	Won	
Hanteo Music Awards	2023	Main Award (Bonsang)	TXT	Won	
Hanteo Music Awards	2025	Best Performance (Daesang)	TXT	Won	
Hanteo Music Awards	2025	Artists of the Year (Bonsang)	TXT	Won	
Hanteo Music Awards	2025	Top Touring Artist	TXT	Won	
Hanteo Music Awards	2025	Global Artist – North America	TXT	Won	
Hanteo Music Awards	2025	Global Artist – Asia	TXT	Nominated	
Hanteo Music Awards	2025	Global Artist – Europe	TXT	Nominated	
Hanteo Music Awards	2025	Global Artist – North America	TXT	Nominated	
Hanteo Music Awards	2025	Global Artist – Oceania	TXT	Nominated	
Hanteo Music Awards	2025	Global Artist – South America	TXT	Nominated	
Hanteo Music Awards	2025	WhosFandom Award – Male	TXT	Nominated	
Japan Gold Disc Award	2021	New Artist of the Year (Asia)	TXT	Won	
Japan Gold Disc Award	2021	Best 3 New Artist (Asia)	TXT	Won	
Japan Record Awards	2024	Special Award	TXT	Won	
K-World Dream Awards	2024	Bonsang	TXT	Won	
K-World Dream Awards	2024	Journalist Pick Artist	TXT	Won	
K-World Dream Awards	2024	UPICK Popularity Award – Boy Group	TXT	Nominated	
KBS Entertainment Awards	2021	Best Online Content Award	TXT	Won	
Korean Music Awards	2022	Best K-Pop Song	"0x1=Lovesong (I Know I Love You)" (feat. Seori)	Nominated	
Korean Music Awards	2024	Best K-Pop Album	The Name Chapter: Freefall	Nominated	
KMA (KM Chart Awards)	2026	Artist of the Year (Daesang)	TXT	Won	
KMA (KM Chart Awards)	2026	Best Popular Song	“Stick With You ( 하루에 하루만 더)”	Won	
KMA (KM Chart Awards)	2026	Best Popular Male Group	TXT	Won	
KMA (KM Chart Awards)	2026	Ultimate 12 (Bonsang)	TXT	Won	
MAMA Awards	2019	Best New Male Artist	TXT	Won	
MAMA Awards	2019	Worldwide Fans' Choice Top 10	TXT	Won	
MAMA Awards	2019	Worldwide Icon of the Year	TXT	Nominated	
MAMA Awards	2019	Artist of the Year	TXT	Nominated	
MAMA Awards	2020	Worldwide Fans' Choice Top 10	TXT	Won	
MAMA Awards	2020	Worldwide Icon of the Year	TXT	Nominated	
MAMA Awards	2020	Favorite Dance Performance – Group	TXT	Won	
MAMA Awards	2020	Song of the Year	"Can't You See Me?"	Nominated	
MAMA Awards	2020	Best Dance Performance – Male Group	"Can't You See Me?"	Nominated	
MAMA Awards	2021	Worldwide Fans' Choice Top 10	TXT	Won	
MAMA Awards	2021	Artist of the Year	TXT	Nominated	
MAMA Awards	2021	Album of the Year	The Chaos Chapter: Freeze	Nominated	
MAMA Awards	2021	Worldwide Icon of the Year	TXT	Nominated	
MAMA Awards	2021	Best Male Group	TXT	Nominated	
MAMA Awards	2021	TikTok Favorite Moment	TXT	Nominated	
MAMA Awards	2022	Worldwide Fans' Choice Top 10	TXT	Won	
MAMA Awards	2022	Worldwide Icon of the Year	TXT	Nominated	
MAMA Awards	2022	Best Male Group	TXT	Nominated	
MAMA Awards	2022	Artist of the Year	TXT	Nominated	
MAMA Awards	2022	Song of the Year	"Good Boy Gone Bad"	Nominated	
MAMA Awards	2022	Best Dance Performance – Male Group	"Good Boy Gone Bad"	Nominated	
MAMA Awards	2023	Worldwide Fans' Choice Top 10	TXT	Won	
MAMA Awards	2023	Album of the Year	The Name Chapter: Temptation	Shortlisted	
MAMA Awards	2023	Artist of the Year	TXT	Nominated	
MAMA Awards	2023	Best Dance Performance – Male Group	"Sugar Rush Ride"	Nominated	
MAMA Awards	2023	Best Male Group	TXT	Nominated	
MAMA Awards	2023	Best OST	"Goodbye Now"	Nominated	
MAMA Awards	2023	Song of the Year	"Sugar Rush Ride"	Nominated	
MAMA Awards	2023	Song of the Year	"Goodbye Now"	Nominated	
MAMA Awards	2023	Worldwide Icon of the Year	TXT	Nominated	
MAMA Awards	2024	Fan's Choice – Male	TXT	Won	
MAMA Awards	2024	PontaPass Global Favorite Artist	TXT	Won	
MAMA Awards	2024	Album of the Year	The Name Chapter: Freefall	Shortlisted	
MAMA Awards	2024	Artist of the Year	TXT	Nominated	
MAMA Awards	2024	Best Male Group	TXT	Nominated	
MAMA Awards	2024	Fan's Choice of the Year	TXT	Nominated	
MAMA Awards	2025	Visa Super Stage Artist	TXT	Won	
MAMA Awards	2025	Album of the Year	The Star Chapter: Together	Shortlisted	
MAMA Awards	2025	Best OST	"When The Day Comes"	Nominated	
MAMA Awards	2025	Artist of the Year	TXT	Nominated	
MAMA Awards	2025	Best Male Group	TXT	Nominated	
MAMA Awards	2025	Fans' Choice of the Year	TXT	Nominated	
MAMA Awards	2025	Song of the Year	"When The Day Comes"	Nominated	
Melon Music Awards	2019	Rookie of the Year	TXT	Won	
Melon Music Awards	2021	Music Video of the Year	"0x1=Lovesong (I Know I Love You)" (feat. Seori)	Won	
Melon Music Awards	2022	Best Performance – Male	TXT	Won	
Melon Music Awards	2023	Album of the Year	The Name Chapter: Temptation	Nominated	
Melon Music Awards	2023	Best Male Group	TXT	Nominated	
Melon Music Awards	2023	Millions' Top 10	The Name Chapter: Temptation	Nominated	
Melon Music Awards	2023	Top 10 Artist	TXT	Nominated	
Melon Music Awards	2024	Millions' Top 10	Minisode 3: Tomorrow	Nominated	
Melon Music Awards	2025	Top 10 Artist	TXT	Nominated	
Melon Music Awards	2025	Best Male Group	TXT	Nominated	
Melon Music Awards	2025	Millions' Top 10	The Star Chapter: Sanctuary	Nominated	
Melon Music Awards	2025	Best OST	"When the Day Comes"	Nominated	
MTV Europe Music Awards	2022	Best Asia Act	TXT	Won	
MTV Europe Music Awards	2023	Best Push	TXT	Won	
MTV Europe Music Awards	2023	Best Group	TXT	Nominated	
MTV Europe Music Awards	2023	Best K-Pop	TXT	Nominated	
MTV MIAW Awards	2021	K-Pop Domination	TXT	Nominated	
MTV MIAW Awards	2023	K-Pop Domination	TXT	Nominated	
MTV Video Music Awards	2019	Best K-Pop	"Cat & Dog"	Nominated	
MTV Video Music Awards	2020	Best K-Pop	"Run Away"	Nominated	
MTV Video Music Awards	2023	Push Performance of the Year	"Sugar Rush Ride"	Won	
MTV Video Music Awards	2023	Best K-Pop	"Sugar Rush Ride"	Nominated	
MTV Video Music Awards	2023	Group of the Year	TXT	Nominated	
MTV Video Music Awards	2023	Song of Summer	"Do It Like That" (with Jonas Brothers)	Nominated	
MTV Video Music Awards	2024	Best K-Pop	"Deja Vu"	Nominated	
MTV Video Music Awards	2024	Best Group	TXT	Nominated	
Music Awards Japan	2025	Special Award: Oshi-Katsu Request Artist of the Year	TXT	Nominated	
Nickelodeon Mexico Kids' Choice Awards	2021	K-Pop Bomb	TXT	Nominated	
Nickelodeon Mexico Kids' Choice Awards	2022	Favorite K-Pop Group	TXT	Nominated	
Nickelodeon Mexico Kids' Choice Awards	2023	Favorite K-Pop Group	TXT	Nominated	
NME Awards	2022	Best Live Act	TXT	Nominated	
NME Awards	2022	Hero of the Year	TXT	Won	
People's Choice Awards	2021	The New Artist	TXT	Nominated	
Seoul Music Awards	2020	New Artist Award	TXT	Won	
Seoul Music Awards	2020	Popularity Award	TXT	Nominated	
Seoul Music Awards	2020	K-Wave Popularity Award	TXT	Nominated	
Seoul Music Awards	2020	QQ Music Most Popular K-Pop Artist Award	TXT	Nominated	
Seoul Music Awards	2021	Main Award (Bonsang)	TXT	Won	
Seoul Music Awards	2021	Grand Award (Daesang)	TXT	Nominated	
Seoul Music Awards	2021	K-wave Popularity Award	TXT	Nominated	
Seoul Music Awards	2021	Popularity Award	TXT	Nominated	
Seoul Music Awards	2021	Legend Rookie Prize	TXT	Nominated	
Seoul Music Awards	2021	Fan PD Artist Award	TXT	Nominated	
Seoul Music Awards	2021	WhosFandom Award	TXT	Nominated	
Seoul Music Awards	2022	Main Award (Bonsang)	TXT	Nominated	
Seoul Music Awards	2022	Popularity Award	TXT	Nominated	
Seoul Music Awards	2022	K-wave Popularity Award	TXT	Nominated	
Seoul Music Awards	2022	U+Idol Live Best Artist Award	TXT	Nominated	
Seoul Music Awards	2023	Main Award (Bonsang)	TXT	Nominated	
Seoul Music Awards	2023	Popularity Award	TXT	Nominated	
Seoul Music Awards	2023	K-wave Popularity Award	TXT	Nominated	
Seoul Music Awards	2024	Hallyu Special Award	TXT	Nominated	
Seoul Music Awards	2024	Main Award (Bonsang)	TXT	Nominated	
Seoul Music Awards	2024	Popularity Award	TXT	Nominated	
Seoul Music Awards	2025	Main Prize (Bonsang)	TXT	Won	
Seoul Music Awards	2025	Grand Prize (Daesang)	TXT	Nominated	
Seoul Music Awards	2025	Best Song Award	"Deja Vu"	Won	
Seoul Music Awards	2025	Best Album Award	Minisode 3: Tomorrow	Won	
Seoul Music Awards	2025	OST Award	"Can't Stop"	Nominated	
Seoul Music Awards	2025	Popularity Award	TXT	Nominated	
Seoul Music Awards	2025	K-Wave Special Award	TXT	Nominated	
Seoul Music Awards	2025	K-pop World Choice – Group	TXT	Nominated	
Soribada Best K-Music Awards	2019	Rookie Award	TXT	Won	
Soribada Best K-Music Awards	2019	Bonsang	TXT	Nominated	
Soribada Best K-Music Awards	2019	Male Popularity Award	TXT	Nominated	
Soribada Best K-Music Awards	2020	New K-Wave Artist Award	TXT	Won	
Soribada Best K-Music Awards	2020	Bonsang	TXT	Nominated	
Soribada Best K-Music Awards	2020	Male Popularity Award	TXT	Nominated	
Spotify Awards	2020	Radar Artist/Emerging Artist	TXT	Nominated	
The Fact Music Awards	2019	Next Leader Award	TXT	Won	
The Fact Music Awards	2020	Best Performer	TXT	Won	
The Fact Music Awards	2020	TMA Popularity Award	TXT	Nominated	
The Fact Music Awards	2021	Artist of the Year (Bonsang)	TXT	Won	
The Fact Music Awards	2022	Artist of the Year (Bonsang)	TXT	Won	
V Live Awards	2019	Global Rookie Top 5	TXT	Won	
V Live Awards	2019	The Most Loved Artist	TXT	Nominated	

== Other accolades ==
=== State and cultural honors ===
Name of country, year given, and name of honor
Country	Year	Honor or Award	Ref.
South Korea (Note: Honors are given at the Korean Popular Culture and Arts Awards, arranged by the Korea Creative Content Agency and hosted by the Ministry of Culture, Sports and Tourism. They are awarded to those who have contributed to the arts and South Korea's pop culture.)	2022	Minister of Culture, Sports and Tourism Commendation	

=== Listicles ===
Name of publisher, year listed, name of listicle, and placement
Publisher	Year	Listicle	Placement	Ref.
People	2021	Talented Emerging Artists Making Their Mark on the Musical Landscape in 2021	Placed	
