= List of Tomorrow X Together live performances =

Tomorrow X Together live performances
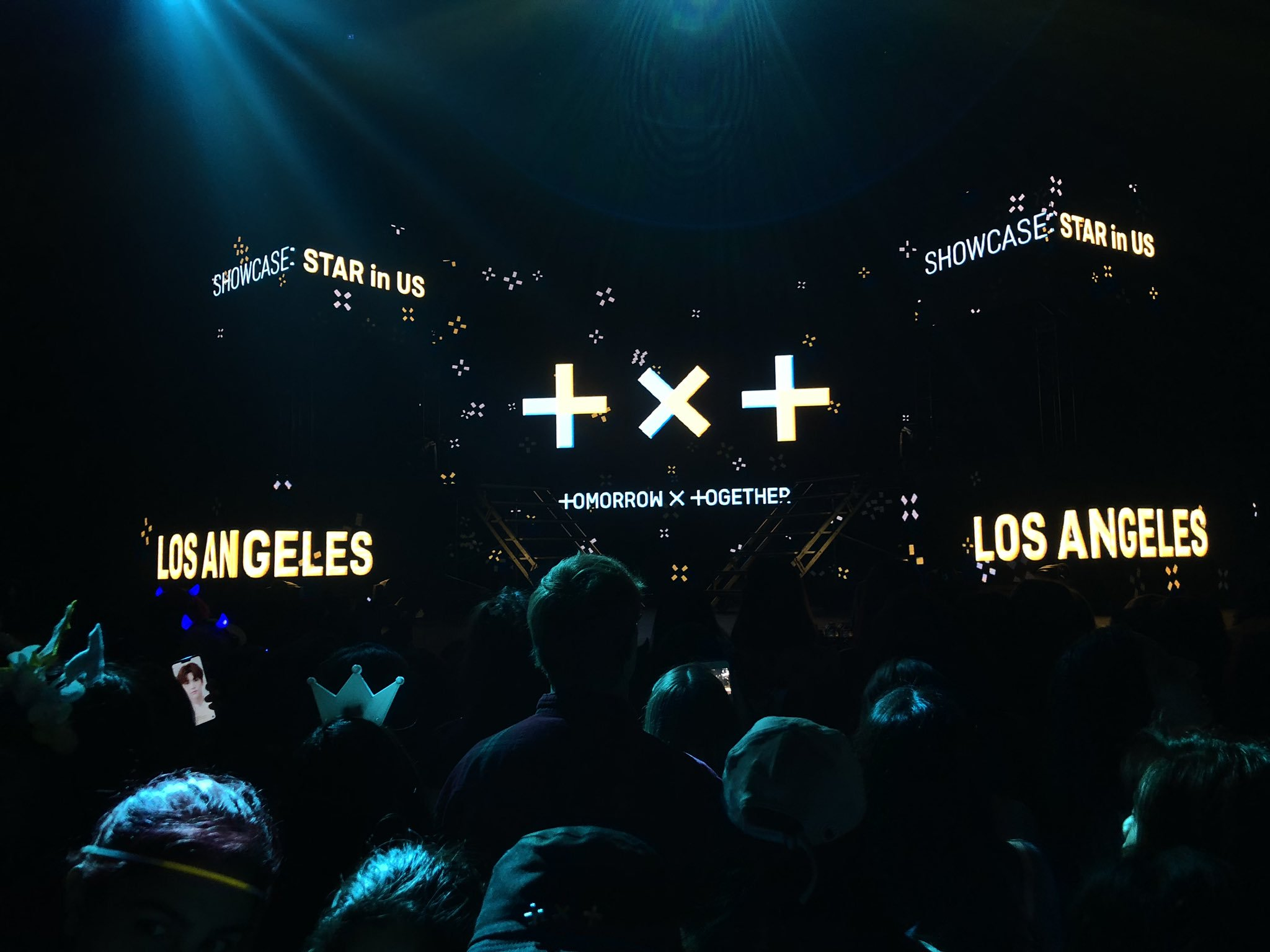
- Tomorrow X Together's showcase in LA in May 2019
- Concert tours: 4
- Online concerts: 1
- Showcases: 7
- Fan meetings: 6
- Festivals: 11

South Korean boy band Tomorrow X Together has performed in three world concert tours, one online concert, three showcases, four fan meetings and two festivals since their debut in 2019. The band's debut solo concert tour in 2022, Act: Lovesick, began in South Korea and then expanded to North America and Asia.

On January 16, 2023, the band announced their second world tour, Act: Sweet Mirage, that would start in Asia during the spring and then expand to North America, with more unannounced dates. On March 11, 2024, they announced their third world tour, Act: Promise, that would start in Seoul and then expand across North America.

== Concert tours ==
| Title | Dates | Associated album(s) | Continent(s) | Shows |
|---|---|---|---|---|
| Act: Lovesick | July 2, 2022 – October 28, 2022 | Various | Asia; North America | 19 |
| Act: Sweet Mirage | March 25, 2023 – December 3, 2023 | The Name Chapter: Temptation; Sweet; The Name Chapter: Freefall | Asia; North America | 29 |
| Act: Promise | May 3, 2024 – May 25, 2025 | Minisode 3: Tomorrow | Asia; North America; Europe | 55 |
| Act: Tomorrow | August 22, 2025 - Feb 14, 2026 | The Star Chapter: Sanctuary; The Star Chapter: Together | Asia; North America | 29 |

== Act: Lovesick ==
Act: Lovesick
- Debut tour by Tomorrow X Together
- Promotional poster for the Seoul concerts
- Location: Asia • North America
- Associated album: Various
- Start date: July 2, 2022
- End date: October 28, 2022
- No. of shows: 11 in Asia; 8 in North America; 19 Total

Tomorrow X Together concert chronology
- Act: Lovesick (2022); Act: Sweet Mirage (2023)

Act: Lovesick is the first concert tour headlined by South Korean boy band Tomorrow X Together in support of their second full album The Chaos Chapter: Freeze and fourth extended play (EP) Minisode 2: Thursday's Child. The tour began on July 2, 2022, in Seoul, South Korea and concluded on October 28, 2022, in Manila, Philippines.

=== Background ===
On April 26, 2022, Tomorrow X Together announced that they would embark on their first world tour. Tour dates in Japan and other Asian countries were unveiled on June 6 and 21, respectively.

On July 1, 2022, the band released a trailer on YouTube along with a poster listing the dates for the tour and marking the start of the tour with its first show at Jamsil Indoor Stadium in South Korea the next day.

=== Set list ===
Seoul, South Korea (July 2–3, 2022)
1. "0x1=Lovesong (I Know I Love You)"
2. "Wishlist"
3. "Blue Orangeade"
4. "Magic"
5. "Ghosting"
6. "New Rules"
7. "Puma"
8. "What If I Had Been That Puma"
9. "Loser=Lover"
10. "Trust Fund Baby"
11. "Crown"
12. "Magic Island"
13. "9 and Three Quarters (Run Away)"
14. "Blue Hour"
15. "Frost"
16. "Maze In the Mirror"
17. "Eternally"
18. "Can't You See Me?"
19. "Lonely Boy (The Tattoo On My Ring Finger)"
20. "Anti-Romantic"
21. "Good Boy Gone Bad"

Encore

22. "Thursday's Child Has Far To Go"
23. "MOA Diary (Dubaddu Wari Wari)"
24. "Sweat"

=== Shows ===
List of concerts, showing date, city, country and venue
| Date | City | Country | Venue | Attendance |
|---|---|---|---|---|
| July 2, 2022 | Seoul | South Korea | Jamsil Indoor Stadium; Weverse | 10,267 |
| July 3, 2022 | Seoul | South Korea | Jamsil Indoor Stadium; Weverse | 10,267 |
| July 7, 2022 | Chicago | United States | Rosemont Theatre | — |
| July 9, 2022 | New York | United States | Hulu Theater | — |
| July 12, 2022 | Atlanta | United States | Fox Theatre | — |
| July 14, 2022 | Dallas | United States | Texas Trust CU Theatre | — |
| July 17, 2022 | Houston | United States | Smart Financial Centre | — |
| July 21, 2022 | San Francisco | United States | Bill Graham Civic Auditorium | — |
| July 23, 2022 | Los Angeles | United States | Microsoft Theater | — |
| July 24, 2022 | Los Angeles | United States | Microsoft Theater | — |
| September 3, 2022 | Osaka | Japan | Ookini Arena Maishima | — |
| September 4, 2022 | Osaka | Japan | Ookini Arena Maishima | — |
| September 8, 2022 | Chiba | Japan | Makuhari Messe Event Hall | — |
| September 9, 2022 | Chiba | Japan | Makuhari Messe Event Hall | — |
| October 12, 2022 | Jakarta | Indonesia | Indonesia Convention Exhibition | — |
| October 22, 2022 | Bangkok | Thailand | Thunder Dome | — |
| October 23, 2022 | Bangkok | Thailand | Thunder Dome | — |
| October 27, 2022 | Pasay | Philippines | SM Mall of Asia Arena | — |
| October 28, 2022 | Pasay | Philippines | SM Mall of Asia Arena | — |
| Total | | | | N/A |

== Act: Sweet Mirage ==
Act: Sweet Mirage
- Tour by Tomorrow X Together
- Tour poster featuring dates for the U.S. leg
- Location: Asia • North America
- Associated album: The Name Chapter: Temptation; Sweet; The Name Chapter: Freefall
- Start date: March 25, 2023
- End date: December 3, 2023
- No. of shows: 19 in Asia; 10 in North America; 29 Total
- Attendance: 379,000
- Box office: $46.8 million

Tomorrow X Together concert chronology
- Act: Lovesick (2022); Act: Sweet Mirage (2023); Act: Promise (2024)

Act: Sweet Mirage is the second concert tour headlined by South Korean boy band Tomorrow X Together in support of their fifth extended play (EP) The Name Chapter: Temptation. The tour began on March 25, 2023, in Seoul, South Korea and concluded on December 3, 2023, in Seoul, South Korea.

=== Setlist ===
Seoul, South Korea (March 25–26, 2023)
1. "Blue Hour"
2. "Can't We Just Leave the Monster Alive"
3. "Drama"
4. "No Rules"
5. "Cat & Dog"
6. "9 and Three Quarters (Run Away)"
7. "We Lost the Summer"
8. "Can't You See Me"
9. "0X1=LOVESONG (I Know I Love You)"
10. "Loser"
11. "Dear Sputnik"
12. "Magic"
13. "Opening Sequence"
14. "Anti-Romantic"
15. "Eternally"
16. "Good Boy Gone Bad"
17. "Tinnitus (Wanna Be A Rock)"
18. "Devil by the Window"
19. "Angel or Devil"
20. "Ice Cream"
21. "Happy Fools"
22. "Sugar Rush Ride"

Encore

23. "Farewell, Neverland"
24. "Blue Spring"
25. "Our Summer"

=== Shows ===
| Date | City | Country | Venue | Attendance |
|---|---|---|---|---|
| March 25, 2023 | Seoul | South Korea | KSPO Dome | — |
| March 26, 2023 | Seoul | South Korea | KSPO Dome | — |
| April 1, 2023 | Singapore | | Singapore Indoor Stadium | — |
| April 4, 2023 | Taipei | Taiwan | Taipei Nangang Exhibition Center | — |
| April 5, 2023 | Taipei | Taiwan | Taipei Nangang Exhibition Center | — |
| April 14, 2023 | Osaka | Japan | Maruzen Intec Arena Osaka | — |
| April 15, 2023 | Osaka | Japan | Maruzen Intec Arena Osaka | — |
| April 18, 2023 | Saitama | Japan | Saitama Super Arena | — |
| April 19, 2023 | Saitama | Japan | Saitama Super Arena | — |
| April 25, 2023 | Kanagawa | Japan | Yokohama Arena | — |
| April 26, 2023 | Kanagawa | Japan | Yokohama Arena | — |
| April 29, 2023 | Aichi | Japan | Port Messe Nagoya First Exhibition Hall | — |
| April 30, 2023 | Aichi | Japan | Port Messe Nagoya First Exhibition Hall | — |
| May 6, 2023 | Charlotte | United States | Spectrum Center | — |
| May 9, 2023 | Elmont | United States | UBS Arena | — |
| May 10, 2023 | Elmont | United States | UBS Arena | — |
| May 16, 2023 | Washington, D.C. | United States | Capital One Arena | — |
| May 19, 2023 | Duluth | United States | Gas South Arena | — |
| May 20, 2023 | Duluth | United States | Gas South Arena | — |
| May 23, 2023 | San Antonio | United States | AT&T Center | — |
| May 24, 2023 | San Antonio | United States | AT&T Center | — |
| May 27, 2023 | Los Angeles | United States | BMO Stadium | — |
| May 28, 2023 | Los Angeles | United States | BMO Stadium | — |
| July 1, 2023 | Osaka | Japan | Kyocera Dome Osaka | — |
| July 2, 2023 | Osaka | Japan | Kyocera Dome Osaka | — |
| August 9, 2023 | Jakarta | Indonesia | Beach City International Stadium | — |
| August 13, 2023 | Santa Maria | Philippines | Philippine Arena | — |
| December 2, 2023 | Seoul | South Korea | Gocheok Sky Dome | — |
| December 3, 2023 | Seoul | South Korea | Gocheok Sky Dome | — |
Total

== Act: Promise ==
Act: Promise
- Tour by Tomorrow X Together
- Promotional poster for the Seoul concerts
- Location: Asia • North America • Europe
- Associated album: Minisode 3: Tomorrow; The Star Chapter: Sanctuary
- Start date: May 3, 2024
- End date: May 24, 2025
- No. of shows: 39 in Asia; 11 in North America; 5 in Europe; 55 Total

Tomorrow X Together concert chronology
- Act: Sweet Mirage (2023); Act: Promise (2024-25); Act: Tomorrow (2025-26)

Act: Promise is the third concert tour headlined by South Korean boy band Tomorrow X Together in support of their 2024 extended play Minisode 3: Tomorrow. The tour began on May 3, 2024, at the KSPO Dome in Seoul, South Korea and includes shows in Seoul, the United States, Japan, China, Singapore, Indonesia and Taiwan. The Japan leg of the tour was announced April 8, 2024, and began on July 10 at Tokyo Dome. Five encore shows were was announced in September; three at Seoul's KSPO Dome, and two at Osaka's Kyocera Dome.

=== Setlist ===
Seoul, South Korea (May 3–5, 2024)

Act I

0. - --- -- --- .-. .-. --- .-- (Tomorrow) (Note: A track from Minisode 3: Tomorrow, it does not have vocals or instrumentation and is simply morse code for "Tomorrow".)
1. Deja Vu
2. Run Away
3. 0X1=LOVESONG (I Know I Love You)
4. Devil by the Window
5. Sugar Rush Ride
6. Farewell, Neverland

Act II

7. Chasing That Feeling
8. Magic
9. New Rules
10. LO$ER=LOVER
11. Ghosting
12. Thursday's Child Has Far To Go
13. Trust Fund Baby
14. Quarter Life (Note: Performed by Beomgyu, Taehyun and Huening Kai.)

Act III

15. The Killa (I Belong To You) (Note: Performed by Soobin and Yeonjun.)
16. Back For More (TXT Version)
17. Tinnitus (돌멩이가 되고 싶어, Wanna be a rock)

Act IV

18. Puma (동물원을 빠져나온 퓨마)
19. Good Boy Gone Bad
20. Growing Pain
21. Dreamer
22. Deep Down
23. I’ll See You There Tomorrow (내일에서 기다릴게)

Act V - Encore

24. Magic Island
25. Miracle (기적은 너와 내가 함께하는 순간마다 일어나고 있어)

=== Shows ===
List of concerts, showing date, city, country and venue
| Date | City | Country | Venue | Attendance |
|---|---|---|---|---|
| May 3, 2024 | Seoul | South Korea | KSPO Dome; Weverse | 32,202 |
| May 4, 2024 | Seoul | South Korea | KSPO Dome; Weverse | 32,202 |
| May 5, 2024 | Seoul | South Korea | KSPO Dome; Weverse | 32,202 |
| May 14, 2024 | Tacoma | United States | Tacoma Dome | 140,000 |
| May 18, 2024 | Oakland | United States | Oakland-Alameda County Coliseum | 140,000 |
| May 21, 2024 | Los Angeles | United States | Crypto.com Arena | 140,000 |
| May 22, 2024 | Los Angeles | United States | Crypto.com Arena | 140,000 |
| May 26, 2024 | Houston | United States | Minute Maid Park | 140,000 |
| May 29, 2024 | Atlanta | United States | State Farm Arena | 140,000 |
| June 1, 2024 | New York | United States | Madison Square Garden | 140,000 |
| June 2, 2024 | New York | United States | Madison Square Garden | 140,000 |
| June 5, 2024 | Rosemont | United States | Allstate Arena | 140,000 |
| June 6, 2024 | Rosemont | United States | Allstate Arena | 140,000 |
| June 8, 2024 | Washington, D.C. | United States | Capital One Arena | 140,000 |
| July 10, 2024 | Tokyo | Japan | Tokyo Dome | — |
| July 11, 2024 | Tokyo | Japan | Tokyo Dome | — |
| July 27, 2024 | Osaka | Japan | Kyocera Dome | — |
| July 28, 2024 | Osaka | Japan | Kyocera Dome | — |
| August 4, 2024 | Aichi | Japan | Vantelin Dome | — |
| August 5, 2024 | Aichi | Japan | Vantelin Dome | — |
| August 30, 2024 | Macau | China | Galaxy Arena | — |
| August 31, 2024 | Macau | China | Galaxy Arena | — |
| September 7, 2024 | Singapore | | Singapore Indoor Stadium | 9,200 |
| September 14, 2024 | Fukuoka | Japan | PayPay Dome | — |
| September 15, 2024 | Fukuoka | Japan | PayPay Dome | — |
| October 2, 2024 | Jakarta | Indonesia | ICE BSD Hall | — |
| October 5, 2024 | Taipei | Taiwan | NTSU Arena | 18,000 |
| October 6, 2024 | Taipei | Taiwan | NTSU Arena | 18,000 |
| November 1, 2024 | Seoul | South Korea | KSPO Dome; Weverse | — |
| November 2, 2024 | Seoul | South Korea | KSPO Dome; Weverse | — |
| November 3, 2024 | Seoul | South Korea | KSPO Dome; Weverse | — |
| November 30, 2024 | Osaka | Japan | Kyocera Dome | — |
| December 1, 2024 | Osaka | Japan | Kyocera Dome | — |
| March 7, 2025 | Incheon | South Korea | Inspire Arena | — |
| March 8, 2025 | Incheon | South Korea | Inspire Arena | — |
| March 9, 2025 | Incheon | South Korea | Inspire Arena | — |
| March 12, 2025 | Kanagawa | Japan | K-Arena Yokohama | — |
| March 13, 2025 | Kanagawa | Japan | K-Arena Yokohama | — |
| March 20, 2025 | Barcelona | Spain | Palau Sant Jordi | — |
| March 25, 2025 | London | England | The O_{2} Arena | — |
| March 27, 2025 | Berlin | Germany | Uber Arena | — |
| March 30, 2025 | Paris | France | Accor Arena | — |
| April 1, 2025 | Amsterdam | Netherlands | Ziggo Dome | — |
| April 12, 2025 | Kagawa | Japan | Anabuki Arena Kagawa | — |
| April 13, 2025 | Kagawa | Japan | Anabuki Arena Kagawa | — |
| April 25, 2025 | Aichi | Japan | Aichi Sky Expo | — |
| April 26, 2025 | Aichi | Japan | Aichi Sky Expo | — |
| April 29, 2025 | Fukuoka | Japan | Marine Messe | — |
| April 30, 2025 | Fukuoka | Japan | Marine Messe | — |
| May 9, 2025 | Macau | China | Galaxy Arena | — |
| May 10, 2025 | Macau | China | Galaxy Arena | — |
| May 11, 2025 | Macau | China | Galaxy Arena | — |
| May 17, 2025 | Osaka | Japan | Asue Arena | — |
| May 18, 2025 | Osaka | Japan | Asue Arena | — |
| May 24, 2025 | Tokyo | Japan | Ariake Arena | — |
| May 25, 2025 | Tokyo | Japan | Ariake Arena | — |

== Act: Tomorrow ==
Act: Tomorrow
- Tour by Tomorrow X Together
- Location: Asia • North America
- Associated album: The Star Chapter: Together; Starkissed
- Start date: August 22, 2025
- End date: February 14, 2026
- No. of shows: 20 in Asia; 9 in North America; 29 Total

Tomorrow X Together concert chronology
- Act: Promise (2024-25); Act: Tomorrow (2025-26)

Act: Tomorrow is the fourth concert tour by South Korean boy band Tomorrow X Together. The tour began on August 22, 2025 at the Gocheok Sky Dome in Seoul, South Korea. The next leg in the United States was announced on July 10, 2025, beginning in September that year. Also, The Japan leg of the tour was announced on August 5, 2025.

=== Setlist ===
Seoul, South Korea (August 22-23, 2025)

Act I

1. LO$ER=LOVER
2. Wishlist
3. Blue Hour (Dance Break Ver.)
4. Blue Orangeade
5. Love Language
6. Over The Moon (Rock Remix)
7. Danger
8. Upside Down Kiss

Act II

1. Growing Pain
2. Frost
3. Good Boy Gone Bad
4. Farewell, Neverland
5. 0X1=LOVESONG (I Know I Love You)

Act III

1. Bird of Night (Taehyun Solo)
2. Sunday Driver (Soobin Solo)
3. Dance With You (Huening Kai Solo)
4. Ghost Girl (Yeonjun Solo)
5. Take My Half (Beomgyu Solo)

Act IV

1. Dear Sputnik
2. No Rules
3. Deja Vu (Anemoia Remix)
4. Eternally

Act V

1. CROWN (Ballad Ver.)
2. Beautiful Strangers
3. Song of the Stars

Act VI - Encore

1. MOA Diary (Dubadu Wari Wari)
2. Magic
3. Our Summer
4. Cat & Dog
5. I’ll See You There Tomorrow
6. Sweat

=== Shows ===
| Date | City | Country | Venue | Attendance |
|---|---|---|---|---|
| August 22, 2025 | Seoul | South Korea | Gocheok Sky Dome | |
| August 23, 2025 | Seoul | South Korea | Gocheok Sky Dome | |
| September 9, 2025 | San Jose | United States | SAP Center at San Jose | |
| September 12, 2025 | Los Angeles | United States | BMO Stadium | |
| September 16, 2025 | Dallas | United States | American Airlines Center | |
| September 21, 2025 | Rosemont | United States | Allstate Arena | |
| September 22, 2025 | Rosemont | United States | Allstate Arena | |
| September 25, 2025 | Atlanta | United States | State Farm Arena | |
| September 28, 2025 | Washington D.C. | United States | Capital One Arena | |
| October 1, 2025 | Newark | United States | Prudential Center | |
| October 2, 2025 | Newark | United States | Prudential Center | |
| November 15, 2025 | Saitama | Japan | Belluna Dome | |
| November 16, 2025 | Saitama | Japan | Belluna Dome | |
| December 6, 2025 | Aichi | Japan | Vantelin Dome Nagoya | |
| December 7, 2025 | Aichi | Japan | Vantelin Dome Nagoya | |
| December 27, 2025 | Fukuoka | Japan | Mizuho PayPay Dome Fukuoka | |
| December 28, 2025 | Fukuoka | Japan | Mizuho PayPay Dome Fukuoka | |
| January 9, 2026 | Hong Kong | China | AsiaWorld–Arena | |
| January 10, 2026 | Hong Kong | China | AsiaWorld–Arena | |
| January 11, 2026 | Hong Kong | China | AsiaWorld–Arena | |
| January 17, 2026 | Singapore | | Singapore Indoor Stadium | |
| January 18, 2026 | Singapore | | Singapore Indoor Stadium | |
| January 21, 2026 | Tokyo | Japan | Tokyo Dome | |
| January 22, 2026 | Tokyo | Japan | Tokyo Dome | |
| January 31, 2026 | Taipei | Taiwan | Taipei Dome | |
| February 1, 2026 | Taipei | Taiwan | Taipei Dome | |
| February 7, 2026 | Osaka | Japan | Kyocera Dome Osaka | |
| February 8, 2026 | Osaka | Japan | Kyocera Dome Osaka | |
| February 14, 2026 | Kuala Lumpur | Malaysia | Axiata Arena | |

== Online concerts ==
| Title | Date | City | Country | Ref. |
|---|---|---|---|---|
| Act: Boy | October 3, 2021 | Seoul | South Korea | |

== Showcases ==
| Title | Date | City | Country | Venue | Ref. |
|---|---|---|---|---|---|
| Debut Showcase 'Star' | March 5, 2019 | Seoul | South Korea | Yes24 Live Hall | |
| Star in US | May 9, 2019 | New York City | United States | Palladium Times Square | |
| Star in US | May 12, 2019 | Chicago | United States | The Vic Theatre | |
| Star in US | May 14, 2019 | Orlando | United States | The Plaza Live | |
| Star in US | May 17, 2019 | Atlanta | United States | Center Stage Theatre | |
| Star in US | May 19, 2019 | Dallas | United States | The Bomb Factory | |
| Star in US | May 24, 2019 | Los Angeles | United States | The Novo | |
| The Name Chapter: Temptation Comeback Showcase | January 28, 2023 | Seoul | South Korea | KINTEX | |
| The Name Chapter: Freefall Comeback Showcase | October 15, 2023 | Seoul | South Korea | Kyung Hee University Grand Peace Palace | |
| Minisode 3: Tomorrow Comeback Showcase | April 1, 2024 | Seoul | South Korea | Korea University Hwajeong Tiger Dome | |
| The Star Chapter: TOGETHER Comeback Showcase | July 21, 2024 | Seoul | South Korea | Kyung Hee University Grand Peace Hall | |
| 7TH YEAR: A Moment of Stillness in the Thorns Comeback Showcase | April 13, 2026 | Seoul | South Korea | Korea University Hwajeong Tiger Dome | |
| Perfect Storm Comeback Showcase | November 5, 2026 | Goyang | South Korea | CJ ENM Ilsan Production Center | |

== Fan meetings ==
| Showcase | Date | City | Country | Venue | Ref. |
|---|---|---|---|---|---|
| 2020 TXT Fanlive Dream X Together | March 7, 2020 | Seoul | South Korea | Blue Square iMarket Hall | |
| 2020 TXT Fanlive Dream X Together | March 8, 2020 | Seoul | South Korea | Blue Square iMarket Hall | |
| 2021 TXT Fanlive Shine X Together | March 6, 2021 | Seoul | South Korea | Blue Square iMarket Hall | |
| 2021 TXT Fanlive Shine X Together | March 7, 2021 | Seoul | South Korea | Blue Square iMarket Hall | |
| 2022 TXT Fanlive MOA X Together | March 5, 2022 | Seoul | South Korea | Olympic Hall | |
| 2022 TXT Fanlive MOA X Together | March 6, 2022 | Seoul | South Korea | Olympic Hall | |
| 2024 TXT Fanlive Present X Together | March 2, 2024 | Seoul | South Korea | SK Olympic Handball Gymnasium | |
| 2024 TXT Fanlive Present X Together | March 3, 2024 | Seoul | South Korea | SK Olympic Handball Gymnasium | |
| 2024 TXT Fanlive Present X Together | March 8, 2024 | Tokyo | Japan | Tokyo Garden Theatre | |
| 2026 TXT MOA CON | February 27, 2026 | Seoul | South Korea | KSPO Dome | |
| 2026 TXT MOA CON | February 28, 2026 | Seoul | South Korea | KSPO Dome | |
| 2026 TXT MOA CON | March 1, 2026 | Seoul | South Korea | KSPO Dome | |
| 2026 TXT MOA CON IN JAPAN | May 23, 2026 | Aichi | Japan | IG Arena | |
| 2026 TXT MOA CON IN JAPAN | May 24, 2026 | Aichi | Japan | IG Arena | |
| 2026 TXT MOA CON IN JAPAN | May 27, 2026 | Chiba | Japan | LaLa arena TOKYO-BAY | |
| 2026 TXT MOA CON IN JAPAN | May 28, 2026 | Chiba | Japan | LaLa arena TOKYO-BAY | |
| 2026 TXT MOA CON IN JAPAN | June 16, 2026 | Fukuoka | Japan | MARINE MESSE FUKUOKA Hall A | |
| 2026 TXT MOA CON IN JAPAN | June 17, 2026 | Fukuoka | Japan | MARINE MESSE FUKUOKA Hall A | |
| 2026 TXT MOA CON IN JAPAN | June 23, 2026 | Hyogo | Japan | GLION ARENA KOBE | |
| 2026 TXT MOA CON IN JAPAN | June 24, 2026 | Hyogo | Japan | GLION ARENA KOBE | |

== Festivals ==
| Event | Date | City | Country | Venue | Ref. |
|---|---|---|---|---|---|
| KCON | July 6, 2019 | New York | United States | Madison Square Garden | |
| 2021 New Year's Eve Live presented by Weverse | December 31, 2020 | Streamed on Weverse only | | | |
| Weverse Con [New Era] | December 31, 2021 | Seoul | South Korea | Korea International Exhibition Center | |
| Lollapalooza | July 30, 2022 | Chicago | United States | Solana x Perry's Stage, Grant Park | |
| Summer Sonic | August 20, 2022 | Osaka | Japan | Mountain Stage, Osaka City Shinkin Bank Stadium | |
| Summer Sonic | August 21, 2022 | Tokyo | Japan | Mountain Stage, Makuhari Messe | |
| KCON | October 15, 2022 | Tokyo | Japan | Ariake Arena | |
| Weverse Con Festival | June 10 – 11, 2023 | Seoul | South Korea | KSPO Dome | |
| Lollapalooza | August 5, 2023 | Chicago | United States | Bud Light Stage, Grant Park | |
| Weverse Con Festival | June 15, 2024 | Incheon | South Korea | Inspire Entertainment Resort | |
| AXE Ceremonia | April 5–6, 2025 (Note: The concert on April 6 was canceled.) | Mexico City | Mexico | Parque Bicentenario | |
| Weverse Con Festival | June 1, 2025 | Incheon | South Korea | Inspire Entertainment Resort | |
| KCON LA | August 16, 2026 | Los Angeles | United States | Crypto.com Arena Los Angeles Convention Center | |
| Inkigayo Live In Tokyo | September 22–23, 2026 | Tokorozawa | Japan | Belluna Dome | |
| Global Citizen Festival | September 26, 2026 (Note: The festival was canceled due to extreme weather forecast. The band livestreamed a practice room live performance on Weverse.) | New York | United States | Central Park | |
| iHeartRadio Jingle Ball | December 11, 2026 | New York | United States | Madison Square Garden | |
| iHeartRadio Jingle Ball | December 13, 2026 | Boston | United States | TD Garden | |
| iHeartRadio Jingle Ball | December 14, 2026 | Washington, DC | United States | Capital One Arena | |
| Weverse Con Festival | March 27–28, 2027 | New Delhi | India | TBD | |
