= The Name Chapter: Freefall =

- Digital cover

Studio album by Tomorrow X Together
- Released: October 13, 2023
- Studios: Hybe (Seoul); SummerChild; Jutes; Cosmos Stockholm; Studio Icon; Carrot Express (Seoul); Rock Mafia (Santa Monica); Andara (Phuket); Uno Mas (Brentwood); Phantom Field; Black Barn; Realworld; Legends Only; Sawpad; Ourtepid; Love & Melody; Patriot (Los Angeles); Summerfield (Birmingham)
- Genres: K-pop; pop rock; alternative rock; synth-pop; new wave
- Length: 26:14
- Languages: Korean; English
- Labels: BigHit; Republic
- Producers: El Capitxn; Zenur; "Hitman" Bang; Rock Mafia; Ryan Tedder; Tyler Spry; Slow Rabbit; Ghstloop; James Keys; Evan Gartner; Supa Dups; Dwilly; Orion Meshoror; Max Schneider; Han Roro; Jin Dong-wook; Maiz; Revin; Beomgyu; Grant Boutin

Tomorrow X Together chronology
| Sweet (2023) | The Name Chapter: Freefall (2023) | Minisode 3: Tomorrow (2024) |

Singles from The Name Chapter: Freefall
- 1. "Do It Like That" Released: July 7, 2023; 2. "Back For More" Released: September 15, 2023; 3. "Chasing That Feeling" Released: October 13, 2023

The Name Chapter: Freefall is the fifth overall studio album by South Korean boy band Tomorrow X Together. It was released through BigHit Music and Republic Records on October 13, 2023.

== Background ==
The album follows their 2023 extended play, The Name Chapter: Temptation, and was announced on August 29, 2023.

== Description ==
The album contains a sole guest appearance from American pop rock band Jonas Brothers. It was supported by two singles: "Do It Like That", a collaboration with the Jonas Brothers, and "Chasing That Feeling". The song "Back for More" was also released before the album in a version that is a collaboration with Brazilian singer Anitta, but a solo version by the band is included on the album.

== Commercial performance ==
The album debuted at number one on the South Korean Circle Album Chart, Japanese Oricon Albums Chart, and Billboard Japan Hot Albums chart. It sold over 2.4 million copies in its first week of release in South Korea, with an additional 215,000 copies sold of its Weverse version. It sold 225,000 copies in its first week in Japan.

According to the International Federation of the Phonographic Industry (IFPI)'s Global Music Report for 2023, The Name Chapter: Freefall was the thirteenth best-selling album worldwide, having sold 2 million units. (Note: The IFPI Global Albums chart ranks, in order, the albums that generated the most money globally across streaming, download, and physical record sales (combined) in a calendar year. The Global Album Sales Chart measures global unit sales across all physical formats, as well as full album downloads.)

== Critical reception ==
=== Accolades ===
Awards and nominations for "The Name Chapter: Freefall"
| Award ceremony | Year | Category | Result | Ref. |
|---|---|---|---|---|
| Circle Chart Music Awards | 2024 | Artist of the Year – Album | Won | |
| Golden Disc Awards | 2024 | Album Bonsang | Won | |

== Track listing ==
The Name Chapter: Freefall track listing
| No. | Title | Writer(s) | Producer(s) | Length |
|---|---|---|---|---|
| 1. | "Growing Pain" | El Capitxn; Vendor (Zenur); Carson Thatcher; Jutes; Maria Marcus; Adam Alexander; "Hitman" Bang; Yeonjun; Lee Yi-jin; Danke; August Rigo; Ronnie Icon; Jeon Ji-eun; Hueningkai; Kim Bo-eun; Song Jae-kyung; Taehyun | El Capitxn; Vendor | 3:20 |
| 2. | "Chasing That Feeling" | Antonina Armato; Tim James; Supreme Boi; Thomas Sturges | Rock Mafia | 3:02 |
| 3. | "Back for More" (TXT version) | Ryan Tedder; Tyler Spry; Slow Rabbit | Tedder; Slow Rabbit; Spry | 2:42 |
| 4. | "Dreamer" | Ghstloop; Koda; Chris Collins; Jack Newsome; Bang; James Keys; Jung Jin-woo; Song; BigHit Music; Lee Y.; Danke; Jo Yoon-kyung; Jeon; Lee Seu-ran; Yeonjun; Stella Jang; Soobin; Beomgyu; Slow Rabbit; Hueningkai | Ghstloop; Keys | 3:06 |
| 5. | "Deep Down" | Gregory Aldae Hein; Alexander Izquierdo; Dwayne "Supa Dups" Chin Quee; Evan Gartner; Fallen; Danke; Hwang Yu-bin; Yeonjun; El Capitxn; Lee Kyung (Wavecloud); Jeon; Thatcher; Grant Yarber; Anthony Russo; Song; Bang; Kim In-hyung; Lee S. | Gartner; Supa Dups | 2:43 |
| 6. | "Happily Ever After" | Max; David Wilson; Brandon Colbein; Orion Meshoror; Taehyun; Bang; Jeon; Song; Lee Y.; Danke; Hwang; Yeonjun | Dwilly; Meshoror; Max | 2:31 |
| 7. | "Skipping Stones" (물수제비) | Han Roro; Jin Dong-wook | Han; Jin; Maiz; Revin | 3:20 |
| 8. | "Blue Spring" | Slow Rabbit; Beomgyu; Andy Love; Taehyun; Rigo; Soobin; Yeonjun; Hueningkai; BigHit Music | Beomgyu; Slow Rabbit | 3:05 |
| 9. | "Do It Like That" (with Jonas Brothers) | Tedder; Grant Boutin; Coleton Rubin | Tedder; Boutin | 2:25 |
| Total length: | | | | 26:24 |

Digital bonus track
| No. | Title | Writer(s) | Producer(s) | Length |
|---|---|---|---|---|
| 10. | "Chasing That Feeling" (English version) | Armato; James; Supreme Boi; Sturges | Rock Mafia | 3:02 |
| Total length: | | | | 29:26 |

== Charts ==
=== Weekly charts ===
Weekly chart performance
| Chart (2023) | Peak position |
|---|---|
| Australian Albums (ARIA) | 31 |
| Austrian Albums (Ö3 Austria) | 8 |
| Belgian Albums (Ultratop Flanders) | 14 |
| Belgian Albums (Ultratop Wallonia) | 3 |
| Canadian Albums (Billboard) | 63 |
| Croatian International Albums (HDU) | 15 |
| Dutch Albums (Album Top 100) | 86 |
| Finnish Albums (Suomen virallinen lista) | 25 |
| French Albums (SNEP) | 2 |
| German Albums (Offizielle Top 100) | 10 |
| Greek Albums (IFPI Greece) | 4 |
| Hungarian Albums (MAHASZ) | 16 |
| Italian Albums (FIMI) | 86 |
| Japanese Albums (Oricon) | 1 |
| Japanese Combined Albums (Oricon) | 1 |
| Japanese Hot Albums (Billboard Japan) | 1 |
| Lithuanian Albums (AGATA) | 37 |
| New Zealand Albums (RMNZ) | 39 |
| Polish Albums (ZPAV) | 9 |
| Portuguese Albums (AFP) | 1 |
| South Korean Albums (Circle) | 1 |
| Spanish Albums (Promusicae) | 18 |
| Swedish Physical Albums (Sverigetopplistan) | 13 |
| Swiss Albums (Schweizer Hitparade) | 12 |
| UK Album Downloads (Official Charts) | 26 |
| UK Independent Albums Breakers (OCC) | 20 |
| US Billboard 200 | 3 |
| US World Albums (Billboard) | 1 |

=== Monthly charts ===
Monthly chart performance
| Chart (2023) | Position |
|---|---|
| Japanese Albums (Oricon) | 2 |
| South Korean Albums (Circle) | 2 |

=== Year-end charts ===
Year-end chart performance
| Chart (2023) | Position |
|---|---|
| Japanese Albums (Oricon) | 13 |
| Japanese Hot Albums (Billboard Japan) | 16 |
| South Korean Albums (Circle) | 7 |

== Certifications ==
Certifications
| Region | Certification | Certified units/sales |
|---|---|---|
| South Korea (KMCA) | 2× Million | 2,000,000^{^} |
| South Korea (KMCA) Weverse Albums version | Platinum | 250,000^{^} |
Summaries
| Worldwide (IFPI) | — | 2,000,000 |
^{^} Shipments figures based on certification alone.
