= List of Solo Leveling episodes =

Key visual for the series

Solo Leveling (Japanese: 俺だけレベルアップな件, Hepburn: Ore dake Reberu Appu na Ken) is an anime television series based on Chugong's South Korean web novel of the same name. It is produced by A-1 Pictures and directed by Shunsuke Nakashige, with Noboru Kimura writing the scripts, Tomoko Sudo designing the characters, and Hiroyuki Sawano composing the music. The first season was originally scheduled for 2023, but was delayed and later aired from January 7 to March 31, 2024, on Tokyo MX and other networks. (Note: Tokyo MX, GYT, GTV and BS11 all list the series premiere as January 6 at 24:00, which is effectively January 7 at midnight JST) The first episode was screened in Tokyo, Seoul, Los Angeles, India, and Europe in December 2023.

Crunchyroll licensed the series outside of Asia. Medialink licensed the series in Southeast Asia and Oceania (except Australia and New Zealand).

After the broadcast of the first-season finale, a second season titled Solo Leveling: Arise from the Shadow was announced. It aired from January 5 to March 30, 2025. (Note: Tokyo MX, GYT, GTV and BS11 all list the season premiere as January 4 at 24:00, which is effectively January 5 at midnight JST) A compilation film of the first season, titled Solo Leveling: ReAwakening, was screened along with the first two episodes of the second season in Japan from November 29 to December 12, 2024. Crunchyroll acquired the North American and select international rights for the compilation film, screening it in the United States and Canada beginning on December 6, 2024.

A sequel anime film titled Solo Leveling: Beyond the System was announced during Crunchyroll's panel at Anime Expo 2026. The film will be produced by A-1 Pictures and directed by Tao Tajima, while Crunchyroll, Aniplex, Netmarble, D&C Media, and Kakao Piccoma were co-producing the film.

== Series overview ==
Season	Episodes	Originally released	
Season	Episodes	First released	Last released
1	12	January 7, 2024	March 31, 2024
2	13	January 5, 2025	March 30, 2025

== Episodes ==
=== Season 1 (2024) ===
No. overall	No. in season	Title	Directed by	Written by	Storyboarded by	Chief animation directed by	Original release date
1	1	"I'm Used to It"	Shunsuke Nakashige	Noboru Kimura	Shunsuke Nakashige & Hirotaka Tokuda	N/A	January 7, 2024
2	2	"If I Had One More Chance"	Yūya Horiuchi	Fūka Ishii	Yūya Horiuchi	Chiaki Furuzumi	January 14, 2024
3	3	"It's Like a Game"	Takayuki Kikuchi	Shingo Irie	Takayuki Kikuchi	Tomoko Sudo	January 21, 2024
4	4	"I've Gotta Get Stronger"	Tōru Hamazaki	Shingo Irie	Ikurō Morimoto & Yoshihiro Kanno	Hirotaka Tokuda	January 28, 2024
5	5	"A Pretty Good Deal"	Makiko Hayase	Norimitsu Kaihō	Makiko Hayase	Chiaki Furuzumi	February 4, 2024
6	6	"The Real Hunt Begins"	Takashi Sakuma	Norimitsu Kaihō	Takashi Sakuma & Yoshihiro Kanno	Tomoko Sudo	February 11, 2024
7	7	"Let's See How Far I Can Go"	Yūya Horiuchi	Shigeru Murakoshi	Yūya Horiuchi	Hirotaka Tokuda	February 18, 2024
8	8	"This Is Frustrating"	Hiromu Ōshiro	Shunsuke Nakashige	Hiromu Ōshiro	Chiaki Furuzumi	March 3, 2024
9	9	"You've Been Hiding Your Skills"	Hirotaka Tokuda	Shingo Irie	Hirotaka Tokuda	Tomoko Sudo & Hirotaka Tokuda	March 10, 2024
10	10	"What Is This, a Picnic?"	Yūya Horiuchi & Takashi Sakuma	Yoshikazu Tominaga	Kōki Onoue	Hirotaka Tokuda	March 17, 2024
11	11	"A Knight Who Defends an Empty Throne"	Takayuki Kikuchi	Noboru Kimura	Takayuki Kikuchi	Chiaki Furuzumi	March 24, 2024
12	12	"Arise"	Shunsuke Nakashige	Noboru Kimura	Shunsuke Nakashige	Tomoko Sudo	March 31, 2024

=== Season 2: Arise from the Shadow (2025) ===
No. overall	No. in season	Title	Directed by	Written by	Storyboarded by	Chief animation directed by	Original release date
13	1	"You Aren't E-Rank, Are You?"	Yūya Horiuchi	Shigeru Murakoshi	Yūya Horiuchi	Tomoko Sudo	January 5, 2025
14	2	"I Suppose You Aren't Aware"	Tatsuya Sasaki	Fūka Ishii	Makoto Muta	Chiaki Furuzumi	January 12, 2025
15	3	"Still a Long Way to Go"	Kōji Furukuwa	Noboru Kimura	Hiroki Hirano	Hirotaka Tokuda	January 19, 2025
16	4	"I Need to Stop Faking"	Makiko Hayase	Noboru Kimura	Makiko Hayase	Tomoko Katasho & Hiromi Ogata	January 26, 2025
17	5	"This Is What We're Trained to Do"	Kento Toya	Shigeru Murakoshi	Kento Toya	Tomoko Sudo	February 2, 2025
18	6	"Don't Look Down on My Guys"	Takayuki Kikuchi	Fūka Ishii	Takayuki Kikuchi	Hirotaka Tokuda	February 9, 2025
19	7	"The 10th S-Rank Hunter"	Hiromu Ōshiro	Yoshikazu Tominaga	Hiromu Ōshiro	Chiaki Furuzumi	February 16, 2025
20	8	"Looking Up Was Tiring Me Out"	Tatsuya Sasaki	Noboru Kimura	Yuka Kuroda & Yoshihiro Kanno	Hiromi Ogata, Tomoko Katasho & Yukiko Busa	February 23, 2025
21	9	"It Was All Worth It"	Yūya Horiuchi	Shigeru Murakoshi	Yūya Horiuchi	Chiaki Furuzumi	March 2, 2025
22	10	"We Need a Hero"	Hirotaka Tokuda	Fūka Ishii	Hirotaka Tokuda	Hirotaka Tokuda	March 9, 2025
23	11	"It's Going to Get Even More Intense"	Kento Toya	Yoshikazu Tominaga	Kento Toya	Tomoko Sudo	March 16, 2025
24	12	"Are You the King of Humans?"	Ryūtarō Suzuki	Noboru Kimura	Ryūtarō Suzuki & Yoshihiro Kanno	Hirotaka Tokuda	March 23, 2025
25	13	"On to the Next Target"	Shunsuke Nakashige	Shunsuke Nakashige	Shunsuke Nakashige	Tomoko Sudo, Chiaki Furuzumi, Hirotaka Tokuda & Kento Toya	March 30, 2025

== Home media release ==
=== Japanese ===
Aniplex (Japan – Region 2/A)
Vol.	Episodes	Release date	Ref.
Season 1
1	1–3	March 27, 2024	
2	4–6	April 24, 2024	
3	7–9	May 29, 2024	
4	10–12	June 26, 2024	
Season 2
1	13–18	April 23, 2025	
2	19–25	June 25, 2025	

=== English ===
Crunchyroll, LLC (North America – Region 1/A)
Vol.	Discs	Episodes	Standard edition release date	Limited edition release date	Ref.
Season 1	4	1–12	July 22, 2025		
Season 2	4	13–25	March 17, 2026		
