= Stella Jang =

South Korean musician (born 1991)

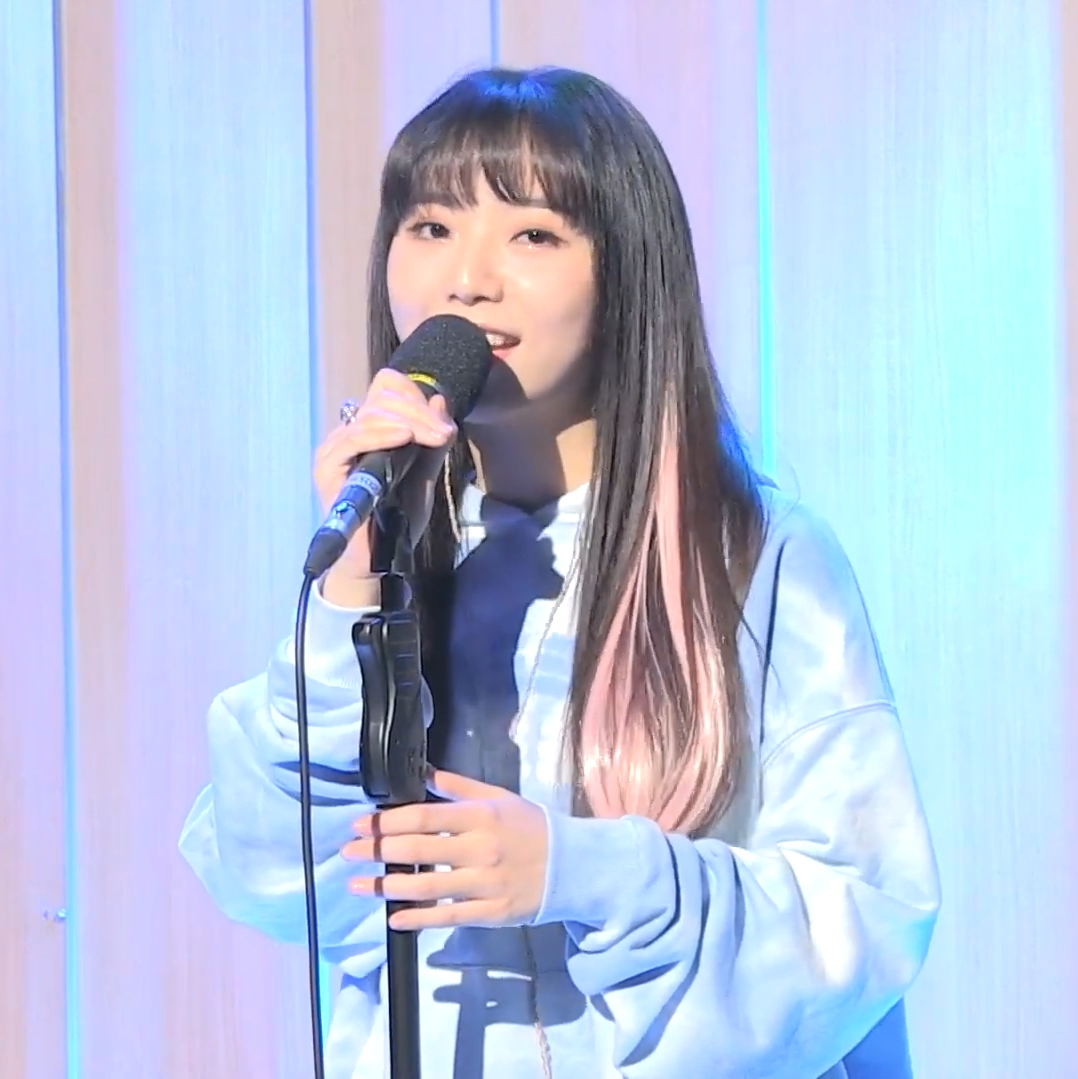
- Jang in April 2021
- Born: Jang Seong-eun; November 18, 1991 (age 34)
- Education: Lycée Henri-IV
- Alma mater: AgroParisTech
- Occupations: Singer; songwriter
- Musical career
- Genres: K-pop; Chanson; Indie; alternative R&B; hip hop
- Instrument: Vocals
- Years active: 2014–present
- Label: Schnauzer Boulangerie

Korean name
- Hangul: 장성은
- Hanja: 張星銀
- RR: Jang Seongeun
- MR: Chang Sŏngŭn

Jang Seong-eun (Korean: 장성은; born November 18, 1991), known professionally as Stella Jang (스텔라장), is a South Korean singer-songwriter.

== Early life and education ==
Jang was born on November 18, 1991. Her father was a missionary, and her mother worked for a welfare foundation for people with disabilities. At the age of twelve, Jang moved to Paris to study abroad, graduating from Lycée Henri-IV and AgroParisTech.

== Career ==
=== 2014–2016: Debut and Colors EP ===
After contributing songwriting and vocals to the album Backpack by South Korean hip-hop duo Geeks, Jang made her solo debut with the single "Dumped Yesterday" on September 19, 2014. However, the song drew little public attention.

On March 23, 2015, Jang released her second single, "It's Raining", featuring rapper Verbal Jint. In an interview that July with BNT News, she said her music was influenced by the 90s sound and tried to reflect elements that would bring relationship with her audiences. On September 15, she released her third single, "Portrait of You", a song about her parents.

Jang released her first EP, Colors, on October 6, 2016. The album was described as "emotional music mixed with rhythmical raps". It entered and peaked on the Circle Album Chart at number 89.

=== 2017–2019: Problematic Men, EPs, and TikTok success ===
Jang attracted the public's interest in May 2017 after an appearance on the South Korean TV show Problematic Men. She debuted as a radio DJ for Gyeonggi Broadcasting on April 22. On April 30, she released a digital EP, Vanishing Paycheck, featuring a single of the same name, which criticizes the reality of office workers. In June, she performed her first solo concert 떡떡 (Knock Knock) at Hyundai Card Understage in Seoul.

On January 23, 2018, Jang released the EP Staples, a collaboration with producer Pleyne, which features a hip hop and R&B sound.

Jang found success on South Korea's real-time music charts with the release of the single "No Question", a collaboration with rapper Mad Clown, on January 18, 2019. On March 24, she released the EP Hazardous Materials, which uses fine dust as a metaphor for harsh realities. Starting in late 2019, Jang's song "Colors" from her 2016 EP of the same name began to gain popularity not only in South Korea, but also worldwide after the song went viral on TikTok.

=== 2020–present: Stella I and Stairs ===
In 2020, Jang released her first studio album, Stella I. She co-wrote the song "Friends" by BTS for Map of the Soul: 7. In 2021, Jang released her fifth EP Stairs.

In 2023, Jang released her single "Orange, You're Not a Joke to Me!" Later on November 1, Jang announced that she would be leaving Grandline Entertainment and running her own label company, Schnauzer Boulangerie.

== Personal life ==
In addition to her native Korean, Jang is fluent in English, French, and Spanish. In 2021, she revealed she had an episode of rhabdomyolysis.

== Discography ==
=== Studio albums ===
Title	Album details	Peak chart positions	Sales
Title	Album details	KOR	Sales
Stella I	Released: April 7, 2020; Label: GRDL; Formats: CD, digital download; Track listing: 1. "Go Your Way"; 2. "Bourgeois Emotion"; 3. "Forever"; 4. "My Ceiling Disappeared"; 5. "Villain"; 6. "Reality Blue"; 7. "You Don't Shine Anymore (Interlude)"; 8. "Choose You"; 9. "Good Job"; 10. "In Other Words"; 11. "Forgive, Forget"; 12. "Storing Nights"	23	KOR: 1,462
STELLA II	Released: April 3, 2025; Label: Schnauzer Boulangerie; Formats: CD, digital download; Track listing: 1. "What Makes You?"; 2. "Break-up Amazing"; 3. "WALKMAN"; 4. "You're Beautiful, Sorrow"; 5. "Un Beau Jour De Pluie"; 6. "News & Sames"; 7. "Land of What Might Have Been"; 8. "An Unexpected Journey"; 9. "I Love to Sing"; 10. "Shine, Little Star"	90	KOR: 900

=== Extended plays ===
Title	Album details	Peak chart positions	Sales
Title	Album details	KOR	Sales
Colors	Released: October 6, 2016; Label: GRDL; Formats: CD, digital download; Track listing: 1. "Colors"; 2. "Girl's Generation"; 3. "Chicken Ribs"; 4. "Dumped Yesterday"; 5. "Transfer"; 6. "It's Raining" (featuring Verbal Jint); 7. "Portrait of You"; 8. "Girl's Generation (Instrumental)"; 9. "Chicken Ribs (Instrumental)"; 10. "Transfer (Instrumental)"	89	
Vanishing Paycheck (월급은 통장을 스칠 뿐)	Released: April 30, 2017; Label: GRDL; Formats: Digital download; Track listing: 1. "A Case of The Mondays"; 2. "Vanishing Paycheck"; 3. "Day Off"; 4. "Departure"	—	
Staples (with Pleyn)	Released: January 22, 2018; Label: GRDL; Formats: CD, digital download; Track listing: 1. "Voyager"; 2. "Monsieur"; 3. "Pyeonggyang Naengmyeon"; 4. "Swing"	96	
Hazardous Materials (유해물질)	Released: March 24, 2019; Label: GRDL; Formats: CD, digital download; Track listing: 1. "Substances Dangereuses"; 2. "CO"; 3. "Fine Dust"; 4. "Alcoholman"; 5. "Under Caffeine"; 6. "How Could A Person Always Be Lovely"	53	
Stairs	Released: October 15, 2021; Label: GLG; Formats: CD, digital download; Track listing: 1. "Stairs"; 2. "Walking Down The Road"; 3. "Some Days"; 4. "Let's Go Home"; 5. "L'Amour, Les Baguettes, Paris"	72	
WinterStella	Released: December 1, 2022; Label: GLG; Formats: CD, digital download; Track listing: 1. "Let It Snow! Let It Snow! Let It Snow!"; 2. "Winter Dream"; 3. "Winter Wonderland"; 4. "The Christmas Song"; 5. "Silver Bells"	—	
"—" denotes release did not chart.

=== Singles ===
Title	Year	Peak chart positions	Album
Title	Year	KOR	Album
"Dumped Yesterday" (어제 차이고)	2014	—	Non-album single
"It's Raining" (feat. Verbal Jint)	2015	—	Colors
"Portrait of You" (뒷모습)	2015	—	Colors
"Transfer" (환승입니다)	2016	—	Colors
"Girl's Generation" (소녀시대)	2016	—	Colors
"Vanishing Paycheck" (월급은 통장을 스칠 뿐)	2017	—	Vanishing Paycheck
"Alright"	2017	—	Non-album singles
"You As You Are" (그대는 그대로)	2017	—	Non-album singles
"Cheerleader" (치어리더) (feat. Olltii)	2017	—	Non-album single
"Voyager" (with Pleyn)	2018	—	Staples
"I Go" (아이고)	2018	—	Non-album single
"Under Caffeine" (카페인)	2018	—	Hazardous Materials
"Your Heart My Heart" (니맘내맘)	2018	—	Non-album singles
"It's Beautiful (Digging Club Seoul Ver.)" (아름다워)	2018	—	Non-album singles
"No Question" (with Mad Clown)	2019	47	Non-album singles
"Fine Dust" (미세먼지)	2019	—	Hazardous Materials
"YOLO"	2019	—	Non-album singles
"Dear My"	2019	—	Non-album singles
"Vacance in September" (9월의 바캉스) (with Kim Jae-hwan)	2019	98	Non-album singles
"Miracle" (보통날의 기적) (feat. Paul Kim)	2019	—	Non-album singles
"Recipe" (레시피)	2020	—	Non-album singles
"Villain" (빌런)	2020	—	STELLA I
"Reality Blue"	2020	—	STELLA I
"Beautiful Mint Life" (인생 봄날) (with Lee Min-hyuk)	2020	—	Non-album singles
"My Sun" (나의 태양)	2020	—	Non-album singles
"Happy Christmas" (with Rocoberry)	2020	—	Non-album singles
"Window Shopping"	2020	—	Non-album singles
"Blue Turns Pink"	2021	—	Non-album singles
"31" (with Cheeze)	2021	—	Non-album singles
"Let's Go Home" (집에 가자)	2021	—	Stairs
"My Winter Trip" (나의 겨울 여행)	2021	—	Non-album singles
"KeeB Going"	2022	—	Non-album singles
"Winter Dream"	2022	—	Winter Stella
"Where Sorrow has Passed" (슬픔이 지나간 자리)	2022	—	Non-album singles
"Orange, You're Not a Joke to Me!"	2023	—	Non-album singles
"I Can Do This Everyday"	2024	—	Non-album singles
"—" denotes release did not chart.

=== Soundtrack appearances ===
Title	Year	Album
"Let Me Love You" (나만 아는 엔딩)	2017	Temperature of Love OST
"Do You Know Me" (날 알아줄까)	2017	I'm Not a Robot OST
"Youth These Days" (요즘 청춘)	2018	A Poem a Day OST
"White Rain" (하얀비) (with Hangzoo)	2018	Partners for Justice OST
"Only You" (그대만 보여)	2018	The Third Charm OST
"I Want to Know You" (널 알고 싶어)	2018	Twelve Nights OST
"Swing Baby"	2018	I Picked Up a Celebrity on the Street OST
"Love Story"	2018	My Strange Hero OST
"Magic" (with Davink)	2019	Spring Turns to Spring OST
"Sunny Day"	2019	The Secret Life of My Secretary OST
"The Best Ending" (아무도 모르는 엔딩)	2019	Best Ending OST
"Dear My"	2019	At Eighteen OST
"Fishbowl" (어항)	2019	Miss Lee OST
"Right Time and Right Place"	2020	Chocolate OST
"Connection" (연결)	2022	Sing in the Green OST
"Love is a Miracle" (Love is 기적) (with Yerin)	2022	Sing in the Green OST
"Sing in the Green" (with Yoon Sang, Yun DDan DDan, Yerin, Adora)	2022	Sing in the Green OST
"Enjoy This Moment" (지금을 사랑해)	2022	Cheer Up OST
"Present" (선물)	2023	The Kidnapping Day OST

=== As songwriter for other artists ===
Artist	Year	Song	Album
BTS	2020	"Friends"	Map of the Soul: 7
Tomorrow x Together	2021	"Ice Cream"	The Chaos Chapter: Freeze
Tomorrow x Together	2023	"Tinnitus (Wanna Be a Rock)"	The Name Chapter: Temptation
Tomorrow x Together	2023	"Farewell, Neverland"	The Name Chapter: Temptation
Tomorrow x Together	2024	"I'll See You There Tomorrow"	Minisode 3: Tomorrow

She also worked on the vocal arrangement of Le Sserafim EP Fearless.

== Filmography ==
=== Television ===
Year	Title	Role	Ref.
2018–2019	Grandma's Restaurant in Samcheong-dong	Cast member	

=== Web shows ===
Year	Title	Role	Ref.
2022	Sing in the Green	Cast Member	
