= Do It Like That (Tomorrow X Together and Jonas Brothers song) =

2023 single by Tomorrow X Together and Jonas Brothers

Single by Tomorrow X Together and Jonas Brothers

from the album The Name Chapter: Freefall
- Released: July 7, 2023
- Genre: Pop rock
- Length: 2:25
- Label: BigHit; Republic
- Songwriters: Ryan Tedder; Grant Boutin; Coleton Rubin
- Producers: Tedder; Boutin

Tomorrow X Together singles chronology
| "Hydrangea Love" (2023) | "Do It Like That" (2023) | "Back for More" (2023) |

Jonas Brothers singles chronology
| "Summer Baby" (2023) | "Do It Like That" (2023) | "Year 3000 2.0" (2023) |

Music video
- "Do It Like That" on YouTube

"Do It Like That" is a song by South Korean boy band Tomorrow X Together and American pop rock band Jonas Brothers. It was released through BigHit Music and Republic Records as the lead single from the boy band's fifth studio album, The Name Chapter: Freefall, on July 7, 2023. The song was produced by Ryan Tedder and Grant Boutin, and the two wrote it alongside Coleton Rubin. Vocals are handled by all members of Tomorrow X Together (Yeonjun, Beomgyu, Taehyun, Huening Kai, and Soobin) and in the Jonas Brothers, Nick and Joe Jonas sing, while Kevin plays guitar. A Jersey club remix of the song was released on July 19, 2023. "Do It Like That" is a pop song that contains building melodies and a strong bass line.

== Background and promotion ==
Tomorrow X Together and the Jonas Brothers teased the song for the first time on June 21, 2023, in which the producer of the song was revealed to be Ryan Tedder, who met Tomorrow X Together as they were touring in the United States. It was described as the "ultimate summer anthem" in a press release. In another press release, an insider affiliated with Tomorrow X Together spoke about the song, in which they said that "this top-tier collaboration was achieved when Tomorrow X Together visited the United States as part of its world tour", adding that "after listening to the demo track for 'Do It Like That,' the band members were eager to have the song released in Summer, and the Jonas Brothers joined the boy band [for collaboration] without hesitation". The concept photo was released shortly after its initial announcement. A teaser of the official music video for the song was revealed on July 5, 2023.

== Music video ==
The official music video for "Do It Like That", directed by Yongsoo Kwon, was released alongside the song on July 7, 2023. It sees Nick, Joe, and Kevin Jonas singing and dancing while the former and latter play instruments before Yeonjun, Beomgyu, Taehyun, Huening Kai, and Soobin join them. The video presents the two bands' members on a white background while wearing colorful outfits and dancing together.

== Accolades ==
Awards for "Do It Like That"
| Year | Organization | Award | Result | Ref. |
|---|---|---|---|---|
| 2023 | The Fact Music Awards | Best Music (Fall) | Nominated | |
| 2023 | MTV Video Music Awards | Song of Summer | Nominated | |

== Track listing ==
Digital download and streaming

1. "Do It Like That" – 2:25

Digital download and streaming (Jersey Club Remix)

1. "Do It Like That" (Jersey Club Remix) – 2:25

Digital download and streaming (Pop R&B Remix)

1. "Do It Like That" (Pop R&B Remix) – 2:34

Digital download and streaming (Alan Walker Remix)

1. "Do It Like That" (Alan Walker Remix) – 2:19

Digital download and streaming (Jax Jones Remix)

1. "Do It Like That" (Jax Jones Remix) – 4:55

== Credits and personnel ==
Credits adapted from Tidal.

- Tomorrow X Together
  - Yeonjun – vocals
  - Beomgyu – vocals
  - Taehyun – vocals
  - Huening Kai – vocals
  - Soobin – vocals
- Jonas Brothers
  - Nick Jonas – vocals
  - Joe Jonas – vocals
  - Kevin Jonas – guitar
- Ryan Tedder – production, songwriting, guitar, bass, background vocals, recording, sound editing, vocal arrangement
- Grant Boutin – production, songwriting, keyboards, drums, programming
- Coleton Rubin – songwriting
- Serban Ghenea – mixing
- Bryce Bordone – mixing assistance
- Chris Gehringer – mastering
- Slow Rabbit – recording, sound editing, vocal arrangement
- Richard Rich III – recording, sound editing
- Zaq Sawyer Coffey – recording
- Stefan Johnson – vocal arrangement

== Charts ==
Chart performance for "Do It Like That"
| Chart (2023) | Peak position |
|---|---|
| Canada Digital Song Sales (Billboard) | 13 |
| Global 200 (Billboard) | 88 |
| Japan Download Songs (Billboard Japan) | 20 |
| Japan Digital Singles (Oricon) | 28 |
| New Zealand Hot Singles (RMNZ) | 9 |
| Singapore Regional (RIAS) | 20 |
| South Korea (Circle) | 136 |
| UK Singles Downloads (Official Charts) | 14 |
| UK Singles Sales (OCC) | 15 |
| US Digital Song Sales (Billboard) | 3 |

== Release history ==
Release history for "Do It Like That"
| Region | Date | Format | Label | Ref |
|---|---|---|---|---|
| Various | July 7, 2023 | Digital download; streaming | BigHit; Republic | |
| United States | August 4, 2023 | CD single | Republic | |
