= Sugar Rush Ride =

2023 single by Tomorrow X Together

Single by Tomorrow X Together

from the EP The Name Chapter: Temptation
- Language: Korean
- Released: January 27, 2023
- Genre: Alternative rock; dance-pop
- Length: 3:06
- Label: BigHit; Republic
- Songwriters: Slow Rabbit; Sofia Kay; Supreme Boi; Moa "Cazzi Opeia" Carlebecker; "Hitman" Bang; Salem Ilese; Krysta Youngs; Myah Marie Langston; Ollipop
- Producer: Slow Rabbit

Tomorrow X Together singles chronology
"Good Boy Gone Bad" (2022)	"Sugar Rush Ride" (2023)	"Goodbye Now" (2023)

Music video
- "Sugar Rush Ride" on YouTube

"Sugar Rush Ride" is a song recorded by South Korean boy band Tomorrow X Together as the lead single from their fifth Korean extended play (EP) The Name Chapter: Temptation. It was released on January 27, 2023, through BigHit Music and Republic Records.

== Critical reception ==
Year-end lists for "Sugar Rush Ride"
Critic/Publication	List	Rank	Ref.
Dazed	Top 50 best K-pop tracks of 2023	49	

== Accolades ==
Awards for "Sugar Rush Ride"
Ceremony	Year	Award	Result	Ref.
The Fact Music Awards	2023	Best Music (Spring)	Nominated	
MTV Video Music Awards	2023	Push Performance of the Year	Won	
MTV Video Music Awards	2023	Best K-Pop	Nominated	
MAMA Awards	2023	Song of the Year	Longlisted	
MAMA Awards	2023	Best Dance Performance – Male Group	Nominated	

== Charts ==
=== Weekly charts ===
Weekly chart performance
Chart (2023)	Peak position
Canada Hot 100 (Billboard)	73
Global 200 (Billboard)	44
Indonesia (Billboard)	14
Japan Hot 100 (Billboard)	27
Japan Combined Singles (Oricon)	25
Malaysia (Billboard)	18
New Zealand Hot Singles (RMNZ)	9
Singapore (RIAS)	11
South Korea (Circle)	11
UK Independent (Official Charts)	42
UK Singles Downloads (Official Charts)	65
UK Singles Sales (OCC)	68
US Bubbling Under Hot 100 (Billboard)	4
US Digital Song Sales (Billboard)	15
US World Digital Song Sales (Billboard)	1
Vietnam Hot 100 (Billboard)	41

=== Monthly charts ===
Monthly chart performance
Chart (2023)	Peak position
South Korea (Circle)	18

=== Year-end charts ===
Year-end chart performance
Chart (2023)	Position
South Korea (Circle)	134

== Release history ==
Release history
Region	Date	Format	Label
Various	January 27, 2023	Digital download; streaming	BigHit; Republic
Japan	June 27, 2023	Digital download; streaming	UMJ
