= The Name Chapter: Temptation =

- Digital cover

EP by Tomorrow X Together
- Released: January 27, 2023
- Genres: Alternative pop; pop rock
- Length: 14:26
- Languages: Korean; English
- Labels: BigHit; Republic

Tomorrow X Together chronology
Minisode 2: Thursday's Child (2022)	The Name Chapter: Temptation (2023)	Sweet (2023)

Singles from The Name Chapter: Temptation
- 1. "Sugar Rush Ride" Released: January 27, 2023

Professional ratings
Review scores
Source	Rating
NME	4/5 stars

The Name Chapter: Temptation (Korean: 이름의 장: Temptation; RR: Ireumui jang: Temptation) is the fifth Korean-language extended play (EP) by South Korean boy band Tomorrow X Together. It was released on January 27, 2023, through BigHit Music and Republic Records. It consists of five tracks, including the lead single "Sugar Rush Ride". In support of the EP, the group embarked on their second concert tour, Act: Sweet Mirage, beginning in March 2023.

== Background and release ==
Hybe Corporation, parent company of BigHit Music, first revealed plans for Tomorrow X Together to release an EP in January 2023 at a corporate briefing on November 9, 2022. The band's new album series, The Name Chapter, was teased first during their performance at the 2022 Melon Music Awards on November 26 and again in a concept trailer uploaded to their official YouTube channel on December 3. The EP was formally announced on social media platforms on December 14 and released on January 27, 2023.

== Music and lyrics ==
The Name Chapter: Temptation has five tracks and includes a guest appearance by American rapper Coi Leray on the third, "Happy Fools". The EP was characterized as Tomorrow X Together's return to their "tried-and-true", "whimsical" themes and intricate storytelling, although this time from a more mature lens and inspired by the story of Peter Pan. Sonically, it was described by some media outlets as one of the group's more experimental projects thus far. The all-English opening track "Devil by the Window" features bass-heavy rhythms. Lead single "Sugar Rush Ride" follows, a "saccharine dance pop" song with "funky guitar riffs" and whistles. The next track, "Happy Fools", draws from bossa nova and R&B; all five members of the group contributed to the lyrics. "Tinnitus (Wanna Be a Rock)" is Tomorrow X Together's foray into Afrobeats, while the closing track "Farewell, Neverland" is a ballad with Latin influences.

== Commercial performance ==
BigHit Music reported on January 10, 2023 that The Name Chapter: Temptation had sold over 1.56 million copies in pre-orders. According to the label, by January 25, pre-orders surpassed 2.16 million copies, a new career high for Tomorrow X Together. The EP debuted at number one on the US Billboard 200 with 161,500 album-equivalent units, earning the band their first number one in the country.

== Live performances ==
In support of the EP, the band embarked on their second concert tour, Act: Sweet Mirage, which began in March 2023.

== Accolades ==
Paste ranked the EP number four in their list of The 20 Best K-pop Albums of 2023, highlighting the record's experimental styles and the group's evolution.

Awards and nominations
Award ceremony	Year	Category	Result	Ref.
MAMA Awards	2023	Album of the Year	Nominated	
Melon Music Awards	2023	Album of the Year	Nominated	
Melon Music Awards	2023	Millions Top 10	Nominated	

== Track listing ==
The Name Chapter: Temptation track listing
No.	Title	Writer(s)	Producer(s)	Length
1.	"Devil by the Window" (자정의 창가에서 만난 악마의 목소리는 달콤했다)	Slow Rabbit; Blvsh; Chris James	Slow Rabbit	3:06
2.	"Sugar Rush Ride"	Slow Rabbit; Sofia Kay; Supreme Boi; Moa "Cazzi Opeia" Carlebecker; "Hitman" Bang; Salem Ilese; Krysta Youngs; Myah Marie Langston; Ollipop	Slow Rabbit	3:07
3.	"Happy Fools" (featuring Coi Leray)	Slow Rabbit; Yeonjun; Leray; Akil "Worldwidefresh" King; Beomgyu; Taehyun; Revin; Soobin; Hueningkai	Slow Rabbit	2:36
4.	"Tinnitus (Wanna Be a Rock)" (돌멩이가 되고 싶어)	Ebby; Dystinkt Beats; Smash David; David Cabral; Taehyun; Jeon Ji-eun; Yeonjun; Lee Seu-ran; Stella Jang; Jo Yoon-kyung; Danke; January 8th	Dystinkt Beats; David	2:37
5.	"Farewell, Neverland" (네버랜드를 떠나며)	Carson Thatcher; "Hitman" Bang; Joseph Kurbanov; Revin; James Sullivan; Jake Torrey; Peter Thomas; El Capitxn; Yeonjun; Moa "Cazzi Opeia" Carlebecker; Ellen Berg; Jeong Jin-woo; Jang; Danke	Thatcher	3:01
Total length:				14:26

== Charts ==
=== Weekly charts ===
Weekly chart performance
Chart (2023)	Peak position
Australian Hitseekers Albums (ARIA)	9
Austrian Albums (Ö3 Austria)	4
Belgian Albums (Ultratop Flanders)	5
Belgian Albums (Ultratop Wallonia)	4
Canadian Albums (Billboard)	15
Danish Albums (Hitlisten)	40
Dutch Albums (Album Top 100)	26
French Albums (SNEP)	3
German Albums (Offizielle Top 100)	12
Hungarian Albums (MAHASZ)	1
Italian Albums (FIMI)	52
Japanese Albums (Oricon)	1
Japanese Combined Albums (Oricon)	1
Japanese Hot Albums (Billboard Japan)	1
South Korean Albums (Circle)	1
Spanish Albums (Promusicae)	20
Swedish Albums (Sverigetopplistan)	17
Swiss Albums (Schweizer Hitparade)	3
US Billboard 200	1
US World Albums (Billboard)	1

=== Monthly charts ===
Monthly chart performance
Chart (2023)	Peak position
Japanese Albums (Oricon)	2
South Korean Albums (Circle)	1

=== Year-end charts ===
Year-end chart performance
Chart (2023)	Position
Belgian Albums (Ultratop Flanders)	172
French Albums (SNEP)	156
Hungarian Albums (MAHASZ)	51
Japanese Albums (Oricon)	21
Japanese Hot Albums (Billboard Japan)	22
South Korean Albums (Circle)	6
US Billboard 200	122
US World Albums (Billboard)	2

== Certifications ==
Certifications
Region	Certification	Certified units/sales
Japan (RIAJ)	Platinum	250,000^{^}
South Korea (KMCA) Physical album	2× Million	2,000,000^{^}
South Korea (KMCA) Weverse album	Platinum	250,000^{^}
United States (RIAA)	Gold	500,000^{‡}
^{^} Shipments figures based on certification alone.^{‡} Sales+streaming figures based on certification alone.
