= Back for More (Tomorrow X Together and Anitta song) =

Single by Tomorrow X Together and Anitta
- Language: English; Spanish
- Released: September 15, 2023
- Genre: K-pop; Brazilian funk
- Length: 2:11
- Label: BigHit; Republic
- Songwriters: Ryan Tedder; Tyler Spry; Slow Rabbit; Zenon; Laudz; Rios; Larissa de Macedo Machado
- Producers: Ryan Tedder; Tyler Spry; Slow Rabbit

Tomorrow X Together singles chronology
"Do it Like That" (2023)	"Back for More" (2023)	"Chasing That Feeling" (2023)

Anitta singles chronology
"Funk Rave" (2023)	"Back for More" (2023)	"Mil Veces" (2023)

Music video
- "Back for More" on YouTube

Back for More is a song by the South Korean boy band Tomorrow X Together and Brazilian singer-songwriter Anitta. It was released on September 15, 2023, by BigHit Music and Republic Records.

== Background and release ==
On September 4, 2023, it was announced that Tomorrow X Together would release a collaborative single with Anitta, titled "Back for More", as a pre-release track. The song was officially released on September 15, 2023.

== Music and lyrics ==
"Back for More" is a K-pop track, characterized by an engaging bassline and funk influences. The lyrics explore the idea that, even in the everyday routine, magical and miraculous moments exist, with the reunion with a loved one being that special moment. Unlike Tomorrow X Together's previous disco songs, which featured a lively and vibrant atmosphere, this track stands out for its more sensual charm.

== Live performances ==
The first live performance of "Back for More" took place at the 2023 MTV Video Music Awards on September 12, just a few days before the song's official release. Additionally, the song was used as the opening theme for the Italian show Il Cittadino Cerca Moglie.

== Accolades ==
Awards and nominations for "Back for More"
Ceremony	Year	Award	Result	Ref.
Asian Pop Music Awards	2023	Best Collaboration (Jury)	Nominated	
Asian Pop Music Awards	2023	Best Producer (Jury)	Nominated	

== Commercial performance ==
On the Billboard Brasil Hot 100, "Back for More" debuted at number 41, marking a significant achievement as the first song by a K-pop group to enter the Brazilian charts.

== Charts ==
Chart performance for "Back for More"
Chart (2023)	Peak position
Brazil Hot 100 (Billboard)	41
Global 200 (Billboard)	37
Japan Download Songs (Billboard Japan)	29
Japan Digital Singles (Oricon)	27
New Zealand Hot Singles (RMNZ)	9
Portugal (AFP)	69
Singapore Regional (RIAS)	12
South Korea BGM (Circle)	69
South Korea Download (Circle)	26
UK Singles Downloads (Official Charts)	4
UK Singles Sales (OCC)	6
US Bubbling Under Hot 100 (Billboard)	11
US Digital Song Sales (Billboard)	3
