= Minisode 3: Tomorrow =

- Romantic version and digital cover

EP by Tomorrow X Together
- Released: April 1, 2024
- Genres: Pop rock; dance
- Length: 17:02
- Languages: Korean; English
- Labels: BigHit; Republic
- Producers: Shift K3Y; "Hitman" Bang; Slow Rabbit; Dystinkt Beats; UV Killin Em; Ebby; Krupa; Steve Manovski

Tomorrow X Together chronology
The Name Chapter: Freefall (2023)	Minisode 3: Tomorrow (2024)	The Star Chapter: Sanctuary (2024)

Singles from Minisode 3: Tomorrow
- 1. "Deja Vu" Released: April 1, 2024

Minisode 3: Tomorrow is the sixth Korean-language extended play (EP) by South Korean boy band Tomorrow X Together. It was released on April 1, 2024, through BigHit Music and Republic Records. It consists of five tracks, including the lead single "Deja Vu", and marks the third installment of their Minisode EP series, following Minisode 2: Thursday's Child (2022).

== Background and release ==
At the "2024 TXT Fanlive Present X Together" event in Seoul on March 2, 2024, which celebrated their fifth anniversary as a group, the band members announced the EP and revealed the logo. The following day, BigHit Music announced that Tomorrow X Together would release their third installment of the Minisode series on April 1. In a statement, BigHit stated that the EP "seamlessly weaves in elements of past albums", including The Chaos Chapter: Freeze (2021) and The Name Chapter: Freefall (2023). The announcement arrived alongside a clip with fireworks and a trademark radar noise that captures the transition from The Name Chapter: Freefall (2023) to Minisode 3: Tomorrow as well as a new logo. The label also shared release details on Weverse. On March 25, the band took to their social media to reveal the tracklist through Polaroid-like images, consisting of six original tracks and one remix.

== Track listing ==
Minisode 3: Tomorrow track listing
No.	Title	Writer(s)	Producer(s)	Length
1.	"I'll See You There Tomorrow" (내일에서 기다릴게)	Lewis Jankel; Uzoechi Emenike; Yeonjun; Kim In-hyung; Ellie Suh (153/Joombas); Maiz; Lee Yi-jin; "Hitman" Bang; Hueningkai; Taehyun; Jeon Ji-eun; Danke; Stella Jang	Shift K3Y	3:16
2.	"- --- -- --- .-. .-. --- .--^{[b]}"	"Hitman" Bang; Slow Rabbit	"Hitman" Bang; Slow Rabbit	0:07
3.	"Deja Vu"	"Hitman" Bang; Slow Rabbit; Martin; Supreme Boi; Ryan Lawrie; Moa "Cazzi Opeia" Carlebecker; Ellen Berg; James; Score (13); Megatone (13)	Slow Rabbit; Martin; "Hitman" Bang	2:51
4.	"Miracle" (기적은 너와 내가 함께하는 순간마다 일어나고 있어)	Slow Rabbit; "Hitman" Bang; James; Soobin; Supreme Boi; Yeonjun; Martin; Taehyun; Maiz; Kristine Bogan; Ido Nadjar; Kirat Singh; Léon Palmen; Sophia Brenan; Mathias Wang; Nick Hahn; Hueningkai	Slow Rabbit; "Hitman" Bang	2:43
5.	"The Killa (I Belong to You)" (sung by Yeonjun and Soobin)	Tomislav Ratisec (Dystinkt); Yuval Haim Chain (UV); Ebby; Ari PenSmith; "Hitman" Bang; Na Jeong-ah (153/Joombas); January 8th; Kim Bo-eun; Hwang Yu-bin; Taehyun; Yeonjun; Jo Yoon-kyung; Kim In-hyung; 4 Seasons (153/Joombas); Danke; Song Jae-kyung	Dystinkt Beats; UV Killin Em; Ebby	2:42
6.	"Quarter Life" (sung by Beomgyu, Taehyun, and Huening Kai)	Jordan Shaw; Alexander Shilov; Steve Manovski; "Hitman" Bang; Chester Krupa Carbone; Hwang Yu-bin; Taehyun; Danke; Ellie Suh (153/Joombas); Soobin; Na Jeong-ah	Krupa; Steve Manovski	2:29
7.	"Deja Vu" (Anemoia remix)	"Hitman" Bang; Slow Rabbit; Martin; Supreme Boi; Ryan Lawrie; Moa "Cazzi Opeia" Carlebecker; Ellen Berg; James; Score (13); Megatone (13)	Slow Rabbit^{[a]}; Martin; "Hitman" Bang; Maiz^{[a]}	2:50
Total length:				17:02

Minisode 3: Tomorrow with Remixes bonus track
No.	Title	Length
8.	"Deja Vu" (sped up version)	2:22
9.	"Deja Vu" (slowed + reverb remix)	3:15
Total length:		22:41

Notes

- ^{^[a]}signifies a remixer
- ^{^[b]} Track two's title is stylized in a Morse code read as "tomorrow".

== Charts ==
=== Weekly charts ===
Weekly chart performance
Chart (2024)	Peak position
Australian Albums (ARIA)	65
Austrian Albums (Ö3 Austria)	2
Belgian Albums (Ultratop Flanders)	9
Belgian Albums (Ultratop Wallonia)	2
Croatian International Albums (HDU)	1
Dutch Albums (Album Top 100)	95
French Albums (SNEP)	4
German Albums (Offizielle Top 100)	6
Greek Albums (IFPI)	2
Italian Albums (FIMI)	83
Japanese Albums (Oricon)	1
Japanese Combined Albums (Oricon)	1
Japanese Hot Albums (Billboard Japan)	1
Polish Albums (ZPAV)	24
Portuguese Albums (AFP)	84
South Korean Albums (Circle)	1
Spanish Albums (Promusicae)	21
Swedish Physical Albums (Sverigetopplistan)	8
Swiss Albums (Schweizer Hitparade)	18
UK Album Downloads (Official Charts)	8
UK Independent Albums (Official Charts)	35
US Billboard 200	3
US World Albums (Billboard)	1

=== Monthly charts ===
Monthly chart performance
Chart (2024)	Position
Japanese Albums (Oricon)	2
South Korean Albums (Circle)	2

=== Year-end charts ===
Year-end chart performance
Chart (2024)	Position
Japanese Albums (Oricon)	22
South Korean Albums (Circle)	7

== Certifications ==
Certifications
Region	Certification	Certified units/sales
South Korea (KMCA)	Million	1,000,000^{^}
^{^} Shipments figures based on certification alone.
