= List of Running Man special series =

Throughout the history of Running Man, special series have progressed with storytelling and movie-like episodes. Many of these series have been praised for their thrill and excitement, and are considered some of the more higher quality episodes of Running Man.

== Special series ==
=== Yoo-mes Bond ===
The Yoo-mes Bond series is famous for its protagonist, Yoo Jae-suk as Yoo-mes Bond (a parody of James Bond), who is known to use a water gun to eliminate his foes to complete his missions. This series features Yoo Jae-suk against the other Running Man members, who do not know Yoo Jae-suk's identity or mission. At the end of both episodes 91 and 140, the words "Yoo-mes Bond Never Die" appeared, hinting at future episodes in the series. These two episodes have been praised for being like a movie instead of a variety show.

Episode(s)	Airdate(s)	Guest(s)	Notes
38	April 10, 2011	No guests	Yoo Jae-suk was given the mission to secretly eliminate the other members by spraying their name tag with a water gun.
91	April 22, 2012	No guests	All members were arrested for various crimes they have committed. Yoo Jae-suk was given the opportunity of a pardon, where he must re-imprison the escaped members by spraying their name tags before they can escape the building. If he is successful in re-imprisoning the other members, he will be free to leave while the other members continue to serve time.
140	April 7, 2013	No guests	Yoo Jae-suk was framed for spreading the "anger virus" and infecting his fellow members. He must find that person impersonating him and eliminate them to retrieve the vaccine.
196	May 18, 2014	No guests	The members "traveled back in the time" to the second Yoo-mes Bond mission, giving the members a second chance at changing the results. Although, Yoo Jae-suk is replaced by Kim Jong-kook to carry the mission.
231	January 25, 2015	No guests	Yoo-mes Bond must work together with "The Successor" to eliminate the other members, but they must always stay together, and Yoo Jae-suk will decide who and when they must eliminate the members.
318–319	September 25, 2016 – October 2, 2016	No guests	Tasked to be a "Scene Stealer", Yoo-mes Bond must obtain the highest number of views by stealing other members' views.
336	January 29, 2017	Gary (Leessang)	During the sixth "Best of the Best Match", Yoo-mes Bond had to shoot other members' name tag with a water gun to get them ousted in the final mission.
449	April 28, 2019	Esom	Yoo-mes Bond is given a main mission to shoot other members' nametag with a water gun upon they finding money vault within 10 minutes to save them from being infected with money poison. Bond Girl is tasked to help out Yoo-mes Bond with his mission and to find out who the spy that is immune and eliminate.
700	April 14, 2024	No guests	TBA

=== Best of the Best Match ===
The "Best of the Best Matches" take place once in a while, often without guests, as the opportunity to decide who is the best "Running Man".

Episode(s)	Airdate(s)	Guest(s)	Notes
42	May 8, 2011	No guests	A race to complete missions first then eliminate each other, with the last standing member declared as the first generation best "Running Man".
74	December 25, 2011	No guests	Each member was granted a superpower, which can be used to aid their efforts to eliminate the other members.
130	January 27, 2013	No guests	A special story, where half of the race takes place in the year 1938 and the other half in 2013. The members are reincarnated in the process, and must find who the final surviving member was in 1938, and who they have been reincarnated as the present time, to solve the mystery and win the race.
196	May 18, 2014	No guests	The members "traveled back in the time" to the second Best of the Best Match, giving the members a second chance at changing the results.
257	July 26, 2015	Hong Jin-ho; Hyun Joo-yup; Kim Yeon-koung; Shin Soo-ji; Song Jong-gook	Instead of being alone, now the Running Man members are accompanied by heroes with special powers. However, the heroes do not know of their superpowers so they must complete a mission to obtain their superpowers. Later, the members with their own heroes face-off in a name tag elimination match, with the heroes acting as helpers.
285	February 7, 2016	No guests	The production staff created 3 missions, specifically for the members using data from the past 6 years they have been together on Running Man; involving agility, nerve, and strength. The results of the missions determine the conditions for the final mission, which was a "Standardized Name Tag Elimination" race — each member are given advantages or disadvantages to create equal attributes among the members.
336	January 29, 2017	Gary (Leessang)	Gary and the production staff hosted another "Best of the Best Match" where, at the beginning, each member must complete missions to determine their superpowers and their levels. The final mission is a name tag elimination race.

=== Running Man-Grasshopper Hunting ===
"Running Man Hunter" is an epithet given to guest Choi Min-soo, who is tasked to eliminate the Running Man members. There is a rivalry between him and Yoo Jae-suk, who betrayed him during his first attempt in the mission. Since then, he had returned to appear in the program to hunt the members and always leave Yoo Jae-suk to be the last surviving member.

Episode(s)	Airdate(s)	Guest(s)	Notes
52–53	July 17–24, 2011	Choi Min-soo Yoon So-yi	Choi Min-soo was tasked to eliminate all the members. He was later betrayed by Yoo Jae-suk who previously agreed to work together with Choi Min-soo to place name tags on the other team's back first, before turning on each other. However, Yoo Jae-suk quickly placed Choi Min-soo's name tag on his back, eliminating him from the race.
69	November 20, 2011	Choi Min-soo	The other members are tied up to a chair and confined in different rooms. Yoo Jae-suk was given four name tags, and must save the other six members. Then, they have to find the way to escape together before Choi Min-soo eliminates him four times.
118	November 4, 2012	Choi Min-soo Park Bo-young	Choi Min-soo eliminates every member, except Yoo Jae-suk and will leave a piece of his name tag at the place where they were eliminated. Yoo Jae-suk must collect all six pieces, in order to defeat Choi Min-soo.

At the end of the episode 118, Choi Min-soo hinted at a possible return to the Running Man Hunter series in the future.

=== Running Man Olympics ===
The Running Man members competes with guests and each other in order to win the "Olympic" battle.

Episode(s)	Airdate(s)	Guest(s)	Notes
86	March 18, 2012	Gaeko (Dynamic Duo) Ha Ji-won	They were grouped into three (Red, Blue, Yellow) and they were tasked to finish the Olympics courses in order to win the gold medal. The courses were bowling, badminton, high jump, and name tag ripping relay.
104	July 22, 2012	Eun-hyuk (Super Junior) Ham Eun-jeong (T-ara) Jung Yong-hwa (CNBLUE) Lee Joon (MBLAQ) Nichkhun (2PM) Si-wan (ZE:A) Yoon Doo-joon (Beast)	They were tasked to defeat the other team in the courses—name tag relay, trampoline volleyball, pool hurdles, and the hide-and-seek switch off.
129	January 20, 2013	Jung Yong-hwa (CNBLUE) Lee Jong-hyun (CNBLUE) Kwang-hee (ZE:A) L (Infinite) Lee Joon (MBLAQ) Min-ho (Shinee) Sulli (f(x))	Idols battle head-to-head against the Running Man team for the second time around. At the end, instead of getting a gold medal, the winners received gold colored name tags.
184	February 9, 2014	Baro (B1A4) Kang Ye-won Park Seo-joon Seo In-guk Son Ho-jun	They were to compete against each other on various courses—speed-skating relay race, test of concentration while crossing the stream, test of teamwork to get the flag, and the name tag ripping on ice.
195	May 11, 2014	Jun. K (2PM) Nichkhun (2PM) Wooyoung (2PM) Junho (2PM) Chansung (2PM) CL (2NE1) Minzy (2NE1) Sandara Park (2NE1) Park Bom (2NE1) Jo Jung-chi Muzie Yoon Jong-shin	They were to compete against each other in three teams in various games: on a relay to have their music video played in a large billboard, Yoo Jae Suk Choice, and Live broadcast Name Tag Elimination 1 vs 1 vs 1.

=== Running Man Football ===
The Running Man members were given a chance to participate in charity football matches alongside Park Ji-sung. Each year, the members would participate in training missions with Park Ji-sung to prepare for the football game prior to the match.

Episode(s)	Airdate(s)	Guest(s)	Notes
95–97	May 20, 2012 – June 3, 2012	Park Ji-sung IU	The 2012 Asian Dream Cup held in Thailand. Kim Jong-kook and Gary were selected after completing missions given by Park Ji-sung.
153–154	July 7 – 14, 2013	Park Ji-sung Koo Ja-cheol Sulli (f(x)) Patrice Evra	The 2013 Asian Dream Cup held in Shanghai, China. Yoo Jae-suk, Kim Jong-kook, Haha, and Lee Kwang-soo were selected by Park Ji-sung and Patrice Evra.
199–200	June 8 – 15, 2014	Park Ji-sung	The 2014 Asian Dream Cup held in Indonesia. All members, except Song Ji-hyo, were able to participate in the game.
283	January 24, 2016	Park Ji-sung Jong Tae-se Ji So-yun	The 2016 Smile Cup held in Shanghai, China. All members were able to participate in the game.

=== Fan-based episodes ===
Aside from the episodes created by the team, the Running Man members undergo challenges suggested by fans or made by the team through their fans' ideas.

Episode(s)	Airdate(s)	Guest(s)	Notes
165	September 29, 2013	No guests	A fan wanted the Running Man members to visit her town with the guidance of her scrapbook. No other clues were given but they knew about her along the way. They were able to meet her, who really admires Lee Kwang-soo, when they surprised her in school to finish the mission.
182	January 26, 2014	Do-hee (Tiny-G) Si-wan (ZE:A) Yeo Jin-goo	An avid fan from Hong Kong was given an opportunity to propose an entire episode solely designed by her for the Running Man members to play. She was also brought to South Korea by the program to observe the filming of the episode and meet the members.
242	April 12, 2015	Jung Il-woo Jung Yong-hwa (CNBLUE) Lee Hong-gi (F.T. Island)	With over 2,000 suggestions, the Running Man members chose and played the games put together by their fans around the world.

=== Tru-Gary Show ===
Gary, who is gullible and unable to lie, has been asking the production staff to give him a spy mission. However, when the production staff decided to give him the mission, they decided to trick him and created hidden camera episodes instead, inspired by the film The Truman Show.

Episode(s)	Airdate(s)	Guest(s)	Notes
11	September 6, 2010	Jung Yong-hwa (CNBLUE) Kim Je-dong	Because of the constant trickery of Yoo Jae-suk to Gary, Ji Suk-jin devised a plan for all of them, including the guests, to trick Gary without him knowing. If they win, all except Gary will get running balls. Otherwise, he'll be the lone receiver of the ball. This game is considered as the first of the 1:8 (1 vs. 8) series.
60	September 11, 2011	No guests	Gary was assigned as a spy and was tasked to eliminate the members. Unbeknownst to him, his entire actions and plans were watched by the rest of the members, knowing that Gary is the spy. The members were later tasked to fool Gary until the end of recording.
265	September 20, 2015	John Park Kyuhyun (Super Junior) Rap Monster (BTS) Ye-eun (Wonder Girls)	The members and the guests were trapped on an island and must find and complete their name tags to escape before the exit path is closed, which will cause them to stay overnight. Unbeknownst to Gary, the production staff informs the other members and guests to prevent Gary from completing his mission and make him the last member to stay in the island.

=== Christmas Episodes ===
The Running Man members (sometimes along with guests) participate in the Christmas events.

Episode(s)	Airdate(s)	Guest(s)	Notes
22	December 19, 2010	Choi Si-won (Super Junior) Kim Min-jong	TBA
74	December 25, 2011	No guests	The second "Best of the Best Match". Each member was granted a superpower, which can be used to aid their efforts to eliminate the other members.
125	December 23, 2012	Jeong Hyeong-don Juvie Train (Buga Kingz) Park Sang-myun Ryu Dam Shindong (Super Junior)	TBA
177	December 22, 2013	Gil (Leessang)	TBA
226	December 21, 2014	Kang Hye-jung Kim Hye-ja Lee Chun-hee	TBA
278	December 20, 2015	Andy (Shinhwa) Bobby B.I (iKon) Chae-yeon Kim Ji-min Kim Jung-nam (Turbo) Lee Ji-hyun Lee Jong-soo Seolhyun (AOA) Stephanie (The Grace)	TBA
331	December 25, 2016	Kim So-hyun	TBA
382	December 24, 2017	No guests	TBA
431-432	December 16 – December 30, 2018	Han Sun-hwa Hwang Chi-yeul Jeon Hye-bin Park Ha-na Sooyoung (Girls' Generation) Sung Hoon	TBA
634	December 25, 2022	No guests	Each members were given mission by the production staff to choose any gifts that the members wanted up to the limit of 300 dollars, which the remained gifts that aren't being chosen by the members, will be given to the fans.
685	December 24, 2023	Yeonjun (Tomorrow X Together); Soobin (Tomorrow X Together); Beomgyu (Tomorrow X Together); Taehyun (Tomorrow X Together); Huening Kai (Tomorrow X Together); Kim Dong-hyun	

=== Running Man Age Notice episodes ===
Each members participated in a race Whether solo or as a team to have one of their age notice concept being used for the show's age notice.

Episode(s)	Airdate(s)	Guest(s)	Notes
385-386	January 14, 2018; January 21, 2018	No guests	Yoo Jae-suk's age notice concept was chosen after Yoo Jae-suk won the race, with members had to dressed as their respective characters that were assigned by him.
401	May 20, 2018	Cheon Sung-moon (Song Ji-hyo's brother); Han Ki-bum; Han Min-gwan; Jo Woo-jong; Kim Ok-jeong (Haha's mother); K.Will; Lee Jong-hyuk; Seo Ji-seok	Haha's age notice concept was chosen after Haha won the race, with members had to dressed as their respective characters that were assigned by him for the doppelganger-themed Age Notice.
563	July 11, 2021	No guests	Members had to dressed as their respective characters that they choose via auction for family-themed Age Notice photoshoot (Grandmother, father, mother, Middle School Female Student, newborn baby, dalmatian, and green onion).
653-654	May 7, 2023; May 14, 2023	No guests	A Team (Yoo Jae-suk, Ji Suk-jin, Kim Jong-kook) won the race with their Age Notice concept was used by the production team.
699	April 7, 2024	No guests	Members were able to filmed Age Notice at the Everland Resort after winning the race.

As per episode 699, Episode 401 is the only Running Man Age Notice episode to feature guests, as the filming for age notice used the doppelganger-themed age notice that Haha created.
