= Beomgyu =

South Korean singer (born 2001)

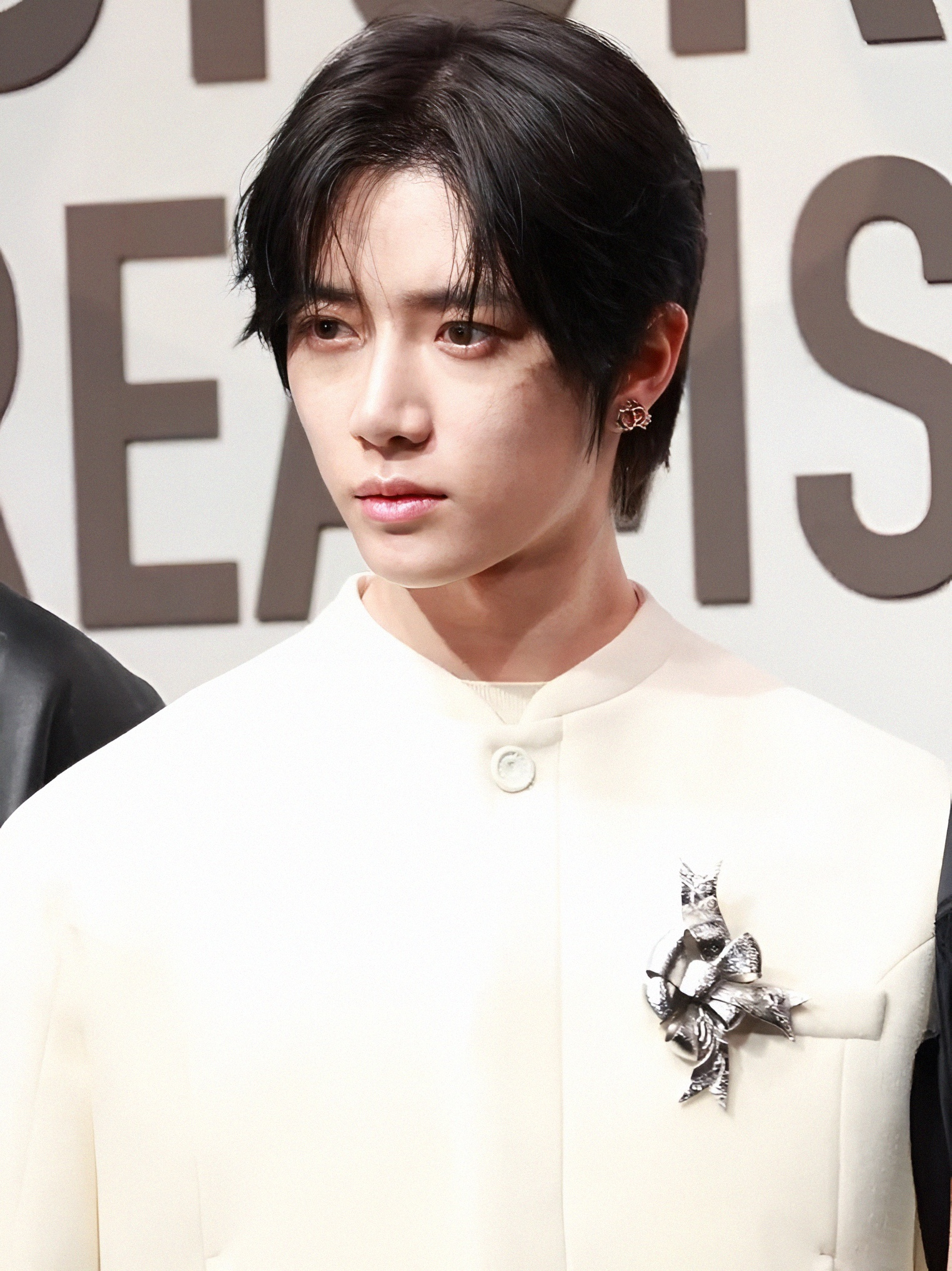
- Beomgyu in April 2025
- Born: Choi Beom-gyu; March 13, 2001 (age 25); Daegu, South Korea
- Occupations: Singer; songwriter
- Years active: 2019–present
- Musical career
- Genre: K-pop
- Instrument: Vocals
- Label: BigHit
- Member of: Tomorrow X Together

Korean name
- Hangul: 최범규
- RR: Choe Beomgyu
- MR: Ch'oe Pŏmgyu

Choi Beom-gyu (Korean: 최범규; born March 13, 2001), known mononymously as Beomgyu, is a South Korean singer and songwriter. He is a member of the South Korean boy band Tomorrow X Together, formed by Big Hit Entertainment in 2019. He released his first solo song "Panic" on March 27, 2025.

== Early life ==
Choi Beom-gyu was born on March 13, 2001, in Daegu, South Korea.

== Career ==
=== 2019–present: Debut with Tomorrow X Together and solo activities ===
Beomgyu was the fifth and final member of Tomorrow X Together to be revealed, having undergone two years of training with BigHit Music. The group debuted on March 4, 2019, with the release of the extended play (EP) The Dream Chapter: Star. The debut was successful with the EP peaking at number one on the Gaon Album Chart and Billboard World Albums Chart and entering the US Billboard 200 at number 140.

Beomgyu's first solo venture was in 2021 when he appeared on JTBC's show Bistro Shigor. He worked as the "handsome part-timer" in the bistro, working alongside Lee Soo-hyuk, Choi Ji-woo, Lee Chang-woo, Cha In-pyo, Changmin and Jo Se-ho.

In January 2023, Beomgyu started hosting a personal-style radio series titled Beomdio. The series was renewed for a second season which concluded in 2025 with a special offline episode at Hansung University. In April 2024, he hosted the web series Workout Zzang Beomgyu (운동 짱 범규) where he would challenge himself with new exercises. The program was shared on the Mdromeda Studio YouTube channel. The series was renewed for a second season four months after season 1 wrapped up, with the second season ending on the October 22.

On March 27, 2025, he released his first solo song, titled "Panic", which he had a role in producing and writing.

== Other ventures ==
Beomgyu has been featured in various fashion magazines. His first solo pictorial was in the March 2023 issue of Marie Claire Korea. Other features include: the September 2024 issue of GQ Korea, the April 2023 issue of Elle Korea alongside member Taehyun, and the October 2024 issue of Arena Homme+ China. In 2026, Beomgyu featured on both the regular and special edition covers of the July issue of Japanese beauty magazine VOCE, working with the brands Lancôme and SK-II. He also appeared in the magazine's June issue.

== Endorsements and influence ==
On October 31, 2023 Inscobee's make-up brand Coralhaze announced that Beomgyu would be their new ambassador and model in both Korea and Japan. The lip tint Beomgyu modeled for, the Glowlock Jelly Tint also referenced to as the "Beomgyu Tint", sold out on the first day of its launch at Olive Young in Korea. In January 2026, Beomgyu participated in Coralhaze's Dew Drop Tint collaboration with the Japanese character Ocha-Ken.

== Philanthropy ==
Beomgyu made donations of ₩30 million won (US$22,242) to Community Chest of Korea on his birthday in 2024 and 2025. The funds were used for the recovery of children and adolescents who grapple with psychological challenges stemming from their familial or peer pressure. On October 14, 2024, Beomgyu attended W Korea's "Love Your W" event for breast cancer awareness alongside his bandmate Yeonjun.

== Discography ==
=== Single albums ===
Title	Details	Peak chart positions	Sales
Title	Details	KOR	Sales
Panic	Released: Mar 27, 2025; Label: BigHit Music; Formats: CD, digital download, streaming	8	KOR: 131,600; JPN: 14,933 (phy.)

=== Singles ===
Title	Year	Peak chart positions					Album
Title	Year	KOR	JPN	JPN Hot	US World	UK	Album
"Panic"	2025	125	4	52	8	10	Non-album single

=== Other charted songs ===
Title	Year	Peak chart positions	Album
Title	Year	KOR	Album
"Take My Half" (Note: credited to Tomorrow X Together, but the track is a solo by Beomgyu)	2025	147	The Star Chapter: Together

==== Songwriting credits ====
All song credits are adapted from the Korea Music Copyright Association's database unless stated otherwise.

Songwriting, composing, and producing credits
Year	Song	Artist	Album	Composer	Lyricist	Producer
2020	"Maze in the Mirror"	Tomorrow X Together	The Dream Chapter: Eternity	Yes	Yes	Yes
2020	"Sweat"	Tomorrow X Together	Non-album single	Yes	Yes	No
2021	"What If I Had Been That Puma"	Tomorrow X Together	The Chaos Chapter: Freeze	Yes	Yes	No
2021	"No Rules"	Tomorrow X Together	The Chaos Chapter: Freeze	Yes	Yes	No
2021	"MOA Diary (Dubaddu Wari Wari)"	Tomorrow X Together	The Chaos Chapter: Fight or Escape	Yes	Yes	No
2021	"MOA Diary" (Japanese Version)	Tomorrow X Together	Chaotic Wonderland	Yes	Yes	No
2022	"Thursday's Child Has Far To Go"	Tomorrow X Together	Minisode 2: Thursday's Child	Yes	Yes	Yes
2023	"Happy Fools" (feat. Coi Leray)	Tomorrow X Together	The Name Chapter: Temptation	Yes	Yes	No
2023	"Happy Fools" (Tomorrow X Together Version)	Tomorrow X Together	Non-album single	Yes	Yes	No
2023	"Dreamer"	Tomorrow X Together	The Name Chapter: Freefall	Yes	Yes	No
2023	"Blue Spring"	Tomorrow X Together	The Name Chapter: Freefall	Yes	Yes	Yes
2024	"Danger"	Tomorrow X Together	The Star Chapter: Sanctuary	Yes	Yes	No
2024	"Resist (Not Gonna Run Away)"	Tomorrow X Together	The Star Chapter: Sanctuary	Yes	Yes	No
2025	"Panic"	Beomgyu	Beomgyu’s Mixtape: Panic	Yes	Yes	Yes
2025	"Take My Half"	Tomorrow X Together	The Star Chapter: Together	Yes	Yes	Yes
