= No Labels: Part 01 =

EP by Yeonjun
- Released: November 7, 2025
- Genre: Hip hop; K-pop; R&B; alternative rock
- Length: 15:35
- Label: BigHit
- Producer: "Hitman" Bang; Mikhail "Misha" Ellis; Slow Rabbit; NPNF; Thom Bridges

Yeonjun chronology
No Labels: Part 01 (2025)	No Labels: Part 02 (2026)

Singles from No Labels: Part 01
- 1. "Talk to You" Released: November 7, 2025

No Labels: Part 01 is the debut solo extended play (EP) by South Korean singer Yeonjun, released on November 7, 2025, by BigHit Music. It marks his first official solo project since debuting with Tomorrow X Together (TXT) in 2019, following his 2024 single "Ggum".

== Background ==
After the success of his 2024 solo mixtape "Ggum", Yeonjun began working on his first extended play, aiming to create music that reflected his personal tastes and experiences rather than external expectations. The title No Labels symbolizes an "unfiltered reflection" of his identity and his journey of self-discovery. Yeonjun described the creative process—writing lyrics, composing, and developing performances—as a way to better understand himself and grow closer to the concept behind the album's title.

== Release and promotion ==
No Labels: Part 01 was announced on October 17, 2025, and released on November 7, 2025, making Yeonjun the first TXT member to issue a solo EP. Its promotional campaign drew attention for its unconventional and artistic approach. The cover art, featuring a shirtless Yeonjun, and the accompanying visuals generated significant online buzz. He interacted with fans through Instagram Live sessions, where he previewed tracks and unboxed the album's versions.

The music video, which combined three tracks in an omnibus format, surpassed 10 million views on YouTube within three days of release. Yeonjun promoted the album on Music programs of South Korea including KBS2's Music Bank and SBS's Inkigayo, as well as U.S. media outlets such as iHeart KPOP with JoJo Wright. He was also scheduled to appear on The Kelly Clarkson Show on November 13. According to Hanteo Chart, the album sold 542,660 copies on its first day.

== Music and lyrics ==
No Labels: Part 01 consists of six tracks that span genres such as alternative rock, punk rock, ska, hip-hop, funk, pop, and acid jazz. The lead single, "Talk to You", is a hard-rock song with energetic guitar riffs. Other tracks include the English-language "Forever", a laid-back, soulful hip-hop song, and "Let Me Tell You", an R&B collaboration with Katseye's Daniela, who contributed Spanish lyrics.

Yeonjun was closely involved in the album's creation, writing lyrics for five of the six songs and co-composing "Talk to You" and "Nothin' 'Bout Me". He also directed aspects of the performances and choreography. Lyrically, the EP draws from his personal experiences, which Yeonjun described as "purely all of my story" and a "journey of self-expression".

== Track listing ==
No Labels: Part 01 track listing
No.	Title	Writer(s)	Producer(s)	Length
1.	"Talk to You"	Yeonjun; "Hitman" Bang; Mikhail "Misha" Ellis; Slow Rabbit; Beau Nox; Benjamin Falik	Bang; Misha; Slow Rabbit; JULiA LEWiS	2:30
2.	"Forever"	Bang; Misha; Slow Rabbit	Bang; Misha; Slow Rabbit	3:06
3.	"Let Me Tell You" (featuring Daniela of Katseye)	Yeonjun; Misha; Flamm; Rachel West; Bang; Slow Rabbit; Sara Schell; Corron Cole; James Bunton	Misha; NPNF	2:34
4.	"Do It"	Yeonjun; Misha; Bang; Slow Rabbit; Corron Cole; James Bunton	NPNF	2:38
5.	"Nothin' 'Bout Me"	Yeonjun; Misha; Bang; Slow Rabbit	Slow Rabbit; Misha	2:12
6.	"Coma"	Yeonjun; Kareen Lomax; Bang; Slow Rabbit; Thom Bridges	Bridges	2:34
Total length:				15:35

== Charts ==
=== Weekly charts ===
Weekly chart performance for No Labels: Part 01
Chart (2025)	Peak position
Belgian Albums (Ultratop Flanders)	113
Belgian Albums (Ultratop Wallonia)	170
French Albums (SNEP)	123
German Albums (Offizielle Top 100)	71
Japanese Albums (Oricon)	3
Japanese Combined Albums (Oricon)	3
Japanese Hot Albums (Billboard Japan)	6
Portuguese Albums (AFP)	65
South Korean Albums (Circle)	1
US Billboard 200	10
US World Albums (Billboard)	2

=== Monthly charts ===
Monthly chart performance for No Labels: Part 01
Chart (2025)	Position
Japanese Albums (Oricon)	11
South Korean Albums (Circle)	5

=== Year-end charts ===
Year-end chart performance for No Labels: Part 01
Chart (2025)	Position
South Korean Albums (Circle)	46
