= The Star Chapter: Sanctuary =

- Digital cover

EP by Tomorrow X Together
- Released: November 4, 2024
- Genres: Pop; R&B
- Length: 14:52
- Languages: Korean; English
- Labels: BigHit; Republic; YG Plus
- Producers: Johnny Goldstein; "Hitman" Bang; Slow Rabbit; Mark Schick; Dem Jointz; Maiz; Evan Gartner; Preston

Tomorrow X Together chronology
Minisode 3: Tomorrow (2024)	The Star Chapter: Sanctuary (2024)	The Star Chapter: Together (2025)

Singles from The Star Chapter: Sanctuary
- 1. "Over the Moon" Released: November 4, 2024

The Star Chapter: Sanctuary (Korean: 별의장: Sanctuary; RR: Byeorui jang: Sanctuary) is the seventh Korean-language extended play (EP) by South Korean boy band Tomorrow X Together. It was released on November 4, 2024, through BigHit Music, Republic Records and YG Plus. It consists of six tracks, including the lead single "Over the Moon".

== Background and release ==
Previously in 2024, Tomorrow X Together released their sixth EP Minisode 3: Tomorrow. The EP was commercially successful, selling 1.18 million copies on its first day of release. The band also embarked on their third concert tour, Act: Promise, and Yeonjun became the band's first member to make a solo debut with "Ggum" in September.

In September 2024, it was reported that the band would be releasing a new project that November. The Star Chapter: Sanctuary was officially announced by BigHit Music on October 7. The EP launches a new series for the band, succeeding the previous "The Dream Chapter", "The Chaos Chapter", "The Name Chapter", and "Minisode" series. Along with the track listing, teaser clips of all tracks were released onto the band's YouTube channel on October 27. The day prior to the album's release, the band performed the lead single "Over the Moon" as a surprise addition to the setlist at the finale Seoul performance of their Act: Promise tour.

The Star Chapter: Sanctuary was released on November 4, 2024, along with the EP's lead single "Over the Moon" and its accompanying music video.

The music video "Over The Moon (Our Sanctuary ver.)" was released on November 7, 2024. It is the English version of the EP's lead single "Over the Moon."

== Composition ==
The EP has been described as being more R&B influenced and featuring more mature lyrics than the band's previous works. The EP's blend of pop and R&B was compared by some critics to Justified by Justin Timberlake. The opening track, "Heaven", is described as the EP's most pop sounding song, with a catchy disco beat. The EP's lead single, "Over the Moon", is an early-2000s R&B-influenced song with "dreamy" guitar riffs. "Danger" is another R&B-influenced track, compared to the band's previous work on Minisode 2: Thursday's Child. "Resist (Not Gonna Run Away)" is a track with acoustic guitar and 2000s-R&B beat throughout, compared by some to Nina Sky's 2004 hit "Move Ya Body". "Forty One Winks" is an upbeat R&B track produced by Dem Jointz, and the final track, "Higher than Heaven", is a bouncy, upbeat pop song.

== Commercial performance ==
With The Star Chapter: Sanctuary, Tomorrow X Together achieved "million-seller" status in the first week for the fifth consecutive time, with BigHit reporting 1,217,880 copies sold on the first day. In Japan, the EP sold 270,000 copies in its first two days, surpassing the 174,000 weekly total of the band's previous EP, Minisode 3: Tomorrow.

== Track listing ==
The Star Chapter: Sanctuary track listing
No.	Title	Writer(s)	Producer(s)	Length
1.	"Heaven"	Johnny Goldstein; JBach; Sean Douglas; Slow Rabbit; Yeonjun; Four Seasons (153/Joombas); Ellie Suh (153/Joombas); Taehyun; Lee Yi-jin; Jo Yoon-kyung; Soobin; Danke; Lee Seu-ran; Jung Jin-woo	Goldstein; Slow Rabbit	2:34
2.	"Over the Moon"	"Hitman" Bang; Slow Rabbit; Feli Ferraro; JBach; Sam Martin; Mark Schick; Danke	Slow Rabbit; Bang; Schick	2:37
3.	"Danger"	Goldstein; Slow Rabbit; Douglas; Ferraro; Hwang Yu-bin; Jo; Na Jung-ah (153/Joombas); Tru (153/Joombas); Kim Bo-eun; Woo Seung-yeon (153/Joombas); Yeonjun; Taehyun; Danke; Beomgyu; Lee Seu-ran; Jeong Ha-ri (153/Joombas)	Goldstein; Slow Rabbit	2:15
4.	"Resist (Not Gonna Run Away)"	Bang; Slow Rabbit; Carson Thatcher; Ewan Mainwood; Beomgyu; Danke; Woo; Tru; January 8th; Lee Seu-ran; Soobin; Kim In-hyung; Jo; Taehyun; Hueningkai; Jeon Ji-eun; Na Jung-ah	Bang; Slow Rabbit; Thatcher; Mainwood	2:09
5.	"Forty One Winks"	Dwayne Abernathy Jr.; David "Lucky Daye" Brown; Carmen Reece; Danke; Suh; Jordin Sparks; Hwang; Lee; Kim Bo-eun; Four Seasons; Jeon; Na Jung-ah; Lee Yi-jin; Kim In-hyung	Dem Jointz	2:33
6.	"Higher than Heaven"	Evan Gartner; Rachel West; Maiz; Sam Preston; Hwang; Taehyun; Lee Yi-jin; Jo; Na Jung-ah; Danke; Four Seasons (153/Joombas); Na Do-yeon (153/Joombas); Woo	Maiz; Gartner; Preston	2:41
Total length:				14:52

The Star Chapter: Sanctuary (Expanded Edition) bonus tracks
No.	Title	Writer(s)	Producer(s)	Length
7.	"Over the Moon" (English version)	Bang; Slow Rabbit; Ferraro; JBach; Martin; Schick	Slow Rabbit; Bang; Schick	2:37
8.	"Over the Moon" (deep house remix)	Bang; Slow Rabbit; Ferraro; JBach; Martin; Schick; Danke	Slow Rabbit; Bang; Schick; Pxpillon	2:26
9.	"Over the Moon" (R&B remix)	Bang; Slow Rabbit; Ferraro; JBach; Martin; Schick; Danke	Slow Rabbit; Bang; Schick; Maiz	2:34
10.	"Over the Moon" (rock remix)	Bang; Slow Rabbit; Ferraro; JBach; Martin; Schick; Danke	Slow Rabbit; Bang; Schick; Maiz	2:36
Total length:				25:07

== Charts ==
=== Weekly charts ===
Weekly chart performance
Chart (2024)	Peak position
Austrian Albums (Ö3 Austria)	16
Belgian Albums (Ultratop Flanders)	47
Belgian Albums (Ultratop Wallonia)	39
French Albums (SNEP)	26
German Albums (Offizielle Top 100)	25
Greek Albums (IFPI)	29
Hungarian Albums (MAHASZ)	25
Japanese Albums (Oricon)	1
Japanese Combined Albums (Oricon)	1
Japanese Hot Albums (Billboard Japan)	1
Polish Albums (ZPAV)	77
Portuguese Albums (AFP)	11
South Korean Albums (Circle)	1
Spanish Albums (PROMUSICAE)	56
Swiss Albums (Schweizer Hitparade)	35
UK Album Downloads (Official Charts)	11
US Billboard 200	2
US World Albums (Billboard)	1

=== Monthly charts ===
Monthly chart performance
Chart (2024)	Peak position
Japanese Albums (Oricon)	2
South Korean Albums (Circle)	1

=== Year-end charts ===
Year-end chart performance
Chart (2024)	Position
Japanese Albums (Oricon)	8
Japanese Hot Albums (Billboard Japan)	14
South Korean Albums (Circle)	8

Year-end chart performance
Chart (2025)	Position
Japanese Albums (Oricon)	64
Japanese Top Albums Sales (Billboard Japan)	58
US World Albums (Billboard)	12

== Certifications ==
Certifications
Region	Certification	Certified units/sales
Japan (RIAJ)	Platinum	250,000^{^}
South Korea (KMCA)	Million	1,000,000^{^}
^{^} Shipments figures based on certification alone.

== Release history ==
Release history
Region	Date	Format	Label
South Korea	November 4, 2024	CD	BigHit; YG Plus
United States	November 4, 2024	CD	BigHit; Republic
Various	November 4, 2024	Digital download; streaming	BigHit
