= Daniela Avanzini =

American singer and dancer (born 2004)

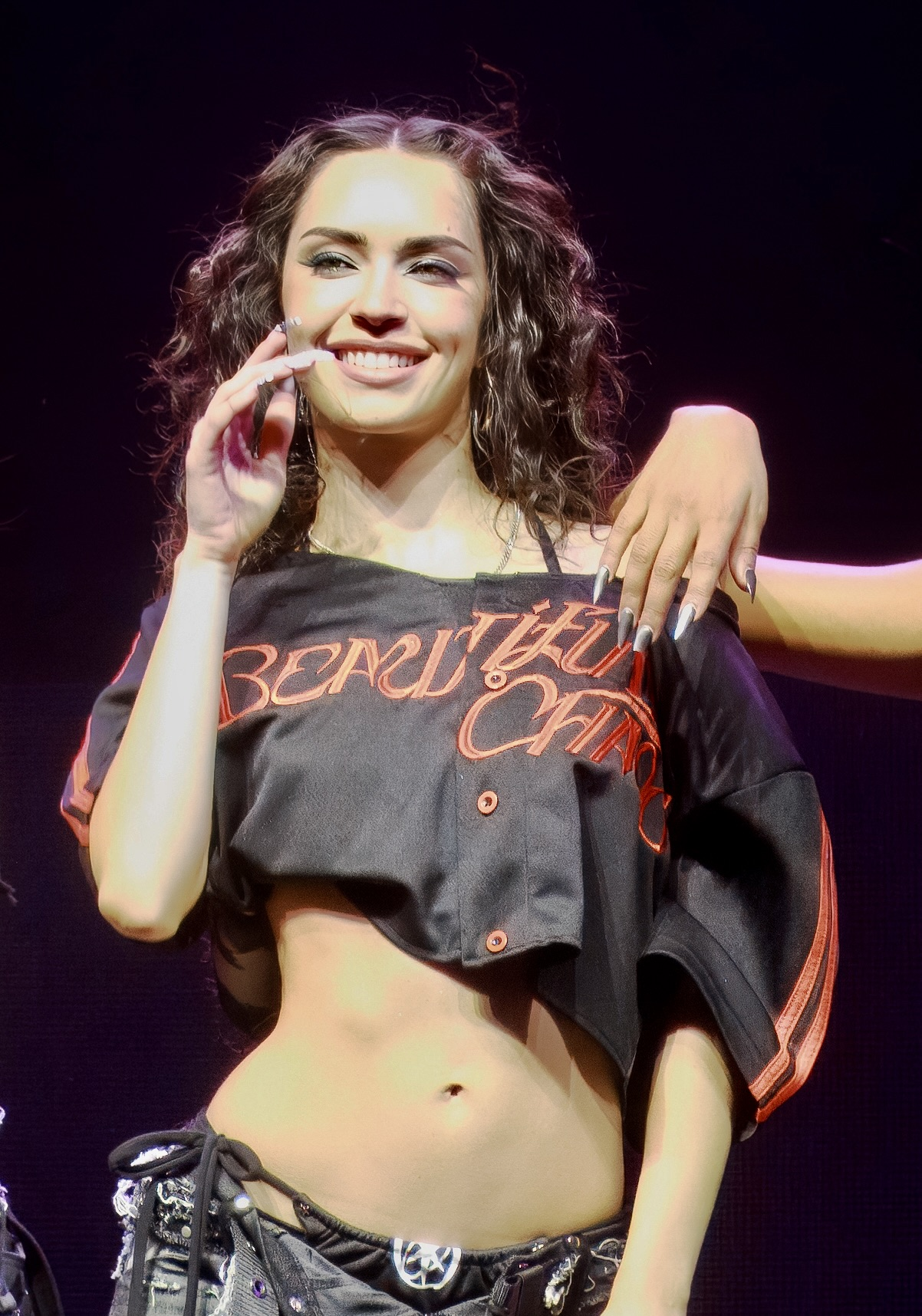
- Avanzini in 2025
- Born: Daniela Andrea Avanzini Llorente; July 1, 2004 (age 22); Atlanta, Georgia, U.S.
- Occupations: Singer; dancer
- Years active: 2011–present
- Musical career
- Genre: Pop
- Instrument: Vocals
- Years active: 2024–present
- Labels: Hybe UMG; Geffen
- Member of: Katseye

Signature
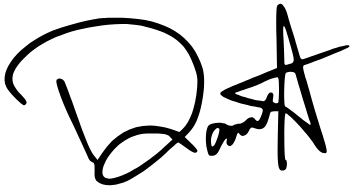

Daniela Andrea Avanzini Llorente (born July 1, 2004) is an American singer and dancer. She is best known as a member of the girl group Katseye, formed through the 2023 reality show Dream Academy. She was previously a contestant on the 13th season of So You Think You Can Dance in 2016.

== Early life ==
Daniela Andrea Avanzini Llorente was born on July 1, 2004, in Atlanta, Georgia, to Rafael Avanzini and Ana Llorente. Her mother is Cuban, and her father is Venezuelan with European heritage, including German, Italian, and Spanish ancestry. She is fluent in English and Spanish. Daniela began performing dancesport when she was four years old. Her mother was the first Cuban to win a world ballroom championship.

== Career ==
=== 2011–2021: Dance projects ===
Avanzini's dance career began with local competitions in Atlanta, but she soon took to international stages. In 2011, at seven years old, she was the 1st runner-up at the international competition Super Kids Europe. At eight years old, she appeared on Univision’s Sábado Gigante, where she danced a choreographed jive number. In 2013, she made it to the Vegas Rounds of the eighth season of America's Got Talent alongside her partner Yasha Jeltuhin as a samba dancer. She also participated in So You Think You Can Dance: The Next Generation as a young teen.

Beyond dance competitions, Avanzini appeared on The Queen Latifah Show alongside Jeltuhin, as part of an "America's Most Talented Kids" segment. She has also worked as a model and actress in commercials, including for Haverty's Furniture at seven years old. In 2021, Avanzini appeared in the independent film Georgia Sky, where she portrayed a young dancer. At age 11, she began uploading videos of herself singing and playing the ukulele to social media.

In 2020, Avanzini appeared in the episode titled "Capital District Pipe, Chef Quani, Daniela Avanzini" as a dance guest in the latest revival of the American children's television series Wonderama, performing an original choreography with salsa, hip-hop, acrobatic and jazz elements. In 2021, she appeared in MattyBRaps' music video for the song "Dramatic".

=== 2021–present: Dream Academy and debut with Katseye ===
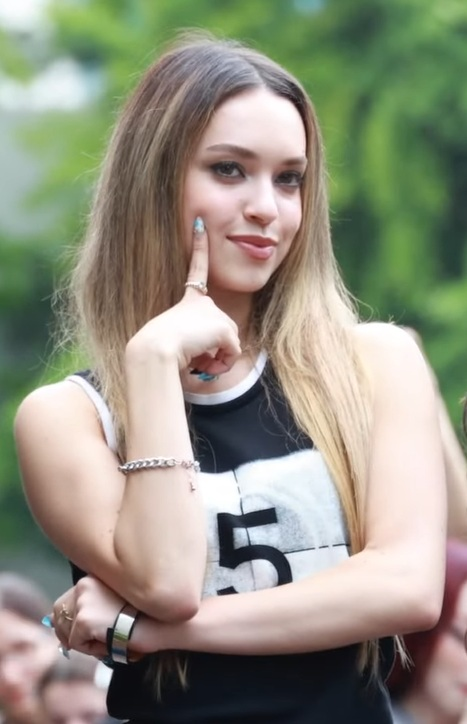
Avanzini in 2024

In 2021, Avanzini entered the Hybe and Geffen Records' global audition Dream Academy, a competition reality show aimed at creating a "global girl group". Her submission stood out for her singing and dancing skills, leading to her selection as one of the 20 contestants in 2023. She eventually placed third, which secured her spot in the resulting girl group Katseye, also making her the first artist of Latin American descent to sign under Hybe.

Avanzini was featured on the track "Let Me Tell You" from South Korean singer Yeonjun's extended play No Labels: Part 01, released on November 7, 2025. She performed paired choreography with Yeonjun in the music video for the track, which was released in an omnibus format with two other songs from the EP.

== Discography ==
As a contestant of Dream Academy, Avanzini participated in the promotional release of the contestants' shared songs for competition. They were performed on November 17, 2023, and released to streaming platforms on August 21, 2024.

=== As lead artist ===
Title	Year	Album
"Girls Don't Like" (as part of The Debut: Dream Academy)	2024	The Debut: Dream Academy - Live Finale
"All The Same" (as part of The Debut: Dream Academy)	2024	The Debut: Dream Academy - Live Finale

=== As featured artist ===
Title	Year	Peak chart positions		Album
Title	Year	KOR DL	NZ Hot	Album
"Let Me Tell You" (Yeonjun featuring Daniela)	2025	40	29	No Labels: Part 01

== Filmography ==
=== Television shows ===
Year	Title	Role	Notes	Ref.
2012	Sábado Gigante	Contestant	with Yasha Jeltuhin	
2013	America's Got Talent season 8	Contestant	with Yasha Jeltuhin	
2016	So You Think You Can Dance: The Next Generation	Contestant	with Jonathan Platero	

=== Reality shows ===
Year	Title	Role	Network	Ref.
2023	Dream Academy	Contestant	YouTube	
2024	Pop Star Academy: Katseye	Herself	Netflix	

=== Music video appearances ===
Year	Title	Artist(s)	Ref.
2021	"Dramatic"	MattyBRaps	
2021	"Lonely"	MattyBRaps	
2025	"Let Me Tell You"	Yeonjun	

== See also ==
- List of dancers
