= 7th Year: A Moment of Stillness in the Thorns =

- Digital cover

EP by Tomorrow X Together
- Released: April 13, 2026
- Genre: Synth-pop
- Length: 16:08
- Languages: Korean; English
- Labels: BigHit; Republic; YG Plus
- Producers: Slow Rabbit; "Hitman" Bang; Jondren Hwang; Osrin; Elkan; Kavin Smith; Maiz; Pxpillon; Elof Loelv; Dave Hamelin

Tomorrow X Together chronology
| Starkissed (2025) | 7th Year: A Moment of Stillness in the Thorns (2026) | Perfect Storm (2026) |

Singles from 7th Year: A Moment of Stillness in the Thorns
- 1. "Stick with You" Released: April 13, 2026

7th Year: A Moment of Stillness in the Thorns (Korean: 7TH YEAR: 가시덤불에 잠시 바람이 멈췄을 때; RR: 7TH YEAR: Gasideombure jamsi barami meomchweosseul ttae) is the eighth Korean-language extended play (EP) by South Korean boy band Tomorrow X Together. It was released on April 13, 2026, through BigHit Music, Republic Records and YG Plus. It consists of six tracks, including the lead single "Stick with You".

== Commercial performance ==
In Korea, album's lead single 'Stick with You ' peaked at No. 3 on the Circle Digital Chart marking the group's first Top 10 and Top 5 entry in the chart. The song would go on to achieve a ‘Grand Slam’, winning 5 awards from Show Champion, M Countdown, Music Bank, Show! Music Core and Inkigayo.

== Track listing ==
7th Year: A Moment of Stillness in the Thorns track listing
| No. | Title | Writer(s) | Producer(s) | Length |
|---|---|---|---|---|
| 1. | "Bed of Thorns" | Slow Rabbit; "Hitman" Bang; Madison Love; Sorana; BigHit Music; Hwang Yu-bin (XYXX); Kim Bo-eun (Jam Factory); Lee Yi-jin; Almeng (XYXX); Mia (153/Joombas); Woo Seung-yeon (153/Joombas); Park Se-rin (Lalala Studio); Jo In-ho (Lalala Studio) | Slow Rabbit; "Hitman" Bang | 2:49 |
| 2. | "Stick with You" | Slow Rabbit; Jondren Hwang; Dev Lemons; Liam Benayon; BigHit Music; Tommy Driscoll; "Hitman" Bang; Jiggy (153/Joombas); Gloria Kaiyi Hui; Jared Fuller Freedman; Roland "Rollo" Spreckley; JBach; Emma Rosen; Grant Averill; Phil Good; January 8th; Ha Yun-ah (153/Joombas); Kim Kiwi; Kim Chae-ah (153/Joombas); Park Sang-yu (153/Joombas); Stalking Gia; Jackson Hoffman; Ryder Stuart | Slow Rabbit; Jondren Hwang | 2:34 |
| 3. | "Take Me to Nirvana" (featuring Vinida Weng) | Willow Kayne; Osrin; Hanna Jäger; Merry Christmas (153/Joombas); Park Sang-yu (153/Joombas); Na Jeong-ah (153/Joombas); Zaya (153/Joombas); Lee Seu-ran; Jo Yoon-kyung; Park Rang (XYXX); BigHit Music; Chah-lee (153/Joombas); Gu-jo (153/Joombas); Geum-to (153/Joombas); Mia (153/Joombas); Lee Yi-jin; Bay (153/Joombas); Yoon (153/Joombas) | Osrin | 2:32 |
| 4. | "So What" | Paul Omar Elkan Agyei; Kavin Smith; Kamal Wilson; Sian Imani Hannah Emeh; Maiz; Pxpillon; Yeonjun; Gu Sam-yeong (153/Joombas); BigHit Music; Maryjane (Lalala Studio); Danke (Lalala Studio); Ellie Suh (153/Joombas); Taehyun; Lee Yi-jin; Kim Gal-pi (153/Joombas); Jang Yeo-jin (Lalala Studio); Jo Yoon-kyung | Elkan; Kavin Smith; Maiz; Pxpillon | 3:13 |
| 5. | "21st Century Romance" | Elof Loelv; Maiz; Spoon (153/Joombas); BigHit Music; Slow Rabbit; Woo Seung-yeon (153/Joombas); Hueningkai; Na Yoon-jeong (Lalala Studio); Gu Sam-yeong (153/Joombas); Kim In-hyung; Bay (153/Joombas); Zaya (153/Joombas); Kim Chae-ah (153/Joombas); Shiloh (XYXX); Chailin (153/Joombas); January 8th; Jeon Ji-eun; Moon Ji-young (Lalala Studio) | Elof Loelv; Slow Rabbit; Maiz | 2:39 |
| 6. | "Dream of Mine" (다음의 다음) | Dave Hamelin; Leven Kali; Pxpillon; Park Song-hui (Jam Factory); Park Sang-yu (153/Joombas); Danke (Lalala Studio); Yoon (153/Joombas); Soobin; Gu Sam-yeong (153/Joombas); Jeong Na-kyeong (153/Joombas); BigHit Music; Tenseechee (XYXX); Jang Yeo-jin (Lalala Studio); Jo Yoon-kyung | Dave Hamelin | 2:21 |
| Total length: | | | | 16:08 |

== Charts ==
=== Weekly charts ===
Weekly chart performance for 7th Year: A Moment of Stillness in the Thorns
| Chart (2026) | Peak position |
|---|---|
| Australian Albums (ARIA) | 59 |
| Austrian Albums (Ö3 Austria) | 24 |
| Belgian Albums (Ultratop Flanders) | 22 |
| Belgian Albums (Ultratop Wallonia) | 16 |
| French Albums (SNEP) | 21 |
| German Albums (Offizielle Top 100) | 36 |
| German Pop Albums (Offizielle Top 100) | 20 |
| Greek Albums (IFPI) | 79 |
| Hungarian Physical Albums (MAHASZ) | 28 |
| Japanese Albums (Oricon) | 1 |
| Japanese Combined Albums (Oricon) | 1 |
| Japanese Hot Albums (Billboard Japan) | 2 |
| Polish Albums (ZPAV) | 77 |
| South Korean Albums (Circle) | 1 |
| US Billboard 200 | 3 |
| US World Albums (Billboard) | 1 |

=== Monthly charts ===
Monthly chart performance for 7th Year: A Moment of Stillness in the Thorns
| Chart (2026) | Peak position |
|---|---|
| Japanese Albums (Oricon) | 3 |
| South Korean Albums (Circle) | 1 |

== Certifications ==
Certifications for 7th Year: A Moment of Stillness in the Thorns
| Region | Certification | Certified units/sales |
|---|---|---|
| Japan (RIAJ) | Platinum | 250,000^{^} |
^{^} Shipments figures based on certification alone.
