= Perfect Storm (EP) =

- Digital cover

EP by Tomorrow X Together
- Released: November 16, 2026
- Length: 16:35
- Languages: Korean; English
- Labels: BigHit; Republic; YG Plus
- Producers: Slow Rabbit; "Hitman" Bang; Frants; Jurek; Martin; Juhoon; Pxpillon; Jason Evigan; Pat Morrissey; Couros; Ryan James Carr; Dwilly; Maiz; UV Killin Em; Heon

Tomorrow X Together chronology
7th Year: A Moment of Stillness in the Thorns (2026)	Perfect Storm (2026)

Singles from Perfect Storm
- 1. "Angel Bite" Released: November 16, 2026

Perfect Storm is the ninth Korean-language extended play (EP) by South Korean boy band Tomorrow X Together. It was released on November 16, 2026, through BigHit Music, Republic Records and YG Plus. It consists of six tracks, including the lead single "Angel Bite".

== Release and promotion ==
On September 27, 2026, the band unveiled a teaser clip of the EP during a livestream. The clip teased a spoiler that said "We need something different from anything before" towards the end. The extended play was made available to pre-save on Spotify on September 28, 2026. The concept trailer for Perfect Storm was released showcasing each bandmember facing the storm in their respective ways within a backdrop of an unsettling and unstable reality. The track list was released on October 24, 2026, featuring six tracks and the lead single was unveiled to be "Angel Bite". The EP would feature two unit tracks: "Sweetest Escape" and "Touch the Sky". Photograph teasers were released on the same day in support of the EP, which had recorded 300,000 pre-saves on Spotify by October 26, 2026.

In early November, it was announced that Lotte World would be hosting an exclusive celebration event for 1,000 fans on November 30, 2026. The event will feature a performance by Tomorrow X Together and access to the indoor park facilities. The members will also play park cast members and interact with fans throughout the event. From November 12 to December 25, 2026, a "TXT Zone" in Safehouse's pop-up event in support of Perfect Storm will take place at Dopamine Station, I'Park Mall. A separate pop-up store run by the members will take place from November 17 to 22, 2026 at Hybe's headquarters located in Yongsan, Seoul. On November 6, 2026, a game in support of the EP was launched inspired by Perfect Storm's concept photos. Players navigate character versions of each member through different weather-related obstacles. On November 13, 2026, during the opening of their fifth world tour Steal the Wind as the KSPO Dome in Seoul, Tomorrow X Together performed all six tracks from Perfect Storm for the first time.

A performance film for the title track "Angel Bite" was released on November 19, 2026.

== Commercial performance ==
As of November 14, 2026, Perfect Storm stayed at number one on Spotify's Top 10 Countdown chart for 20 consecutive days and surpassed a total of 450,000 pre-saves.

Perfect Storm sold 1,534,519 copies in its first two days in South Korea, selling about 729,338 copies on its first day and 805,181 on it's second. This marks the band's eighth consecutive million-seller release. In Japan, Perfect Storm topped Oricon Daily Albums Chart selling 185,637 copies on it's first day.

== Track listing ==
Perfect Storm track listing
No.	Title	Producer(s)	Length
1.	"Storm Is..." (지금까지와는 다른 무언가가 필요해)	"Hitman" Bang; Slow Rabbit; Frants; Jurek	3:16
2.	"Angel Bite"	"Hitman" Bang; Slow Rabbit; Martin; Juhoon	2:33
3.	"Higher Love"	"Hitman" Bang; Slow Rabbit; Pxpillon; Jason Evigan; Pat Morrissey	3:17
4.	"Sweetest Escape"	Couros; Ryan James Carr	2:17
5.	"Touch the Sky"	Slow Rabbit; Dwilly	2:27
6.	"Hate It or Love It"	Maiz; UV Killin Em; Heon	2:45
Total length:			16:35

== Charts ==
Chart performance for Perfect Storm
Chart (2026)	Peak position
UK Album Downloads (Official Charts)	91
