= PS5 (song) =

Single by Salem Ilese and Tomorrow X Together featuring Alan Walker

from the EP Unsponsored Content
- Released: February 23, 2022
- Genre: Pop; K-pop
- Length: 2:32
- Label: Homemade Projects; 10K Projects
- Songwriters: Salem Ilese; Alan Walker; Carl Hovind; Chloe Copoloff; Fredrik Borch Olsen; Gunnar Greve; Jon Sprott; Marcus Arnbekk; Marty Rod; Øyvind Sauvik; Nikkis Thomas
- Producers: Marty Maro; Alan Walker

Salem Ilese singles chronology
"Intuition" (2021)	"PS5" (2022)	"Married to Your Melody" (2022)

Yeonjun singles chronology
"PS5" (2022)	"Ggum" (2024)

Alan Walker singles chronology
"Headlights" (2022)	"PS5" (2022)	"The Drum" (2022)

Audio sample
- First chorus: file; help

Music video
- "PS5" on YouTube

"PS5" is a song by American singer-songwriter Salem Ilese and Yeonjun and Taehyun from South Korean boy group Tomorrow X Together (TXT), featuring Norwegian DJ and record producer Alan Walker, It was released on February 23, 2022. The song is known for a vocal remix by Abdul Cisse about a Fortnite battle pass. An official remix was released 3 months later, with Cisse replacing TXT as the secondary vocalist and Walker's trap production. The song appeared on Salem's third studio extended play, Unsponsored Content.

== Background and release ==
The song was originally written in response to Salem's boyfriend and roommate being video game fanatics, and as soon as they moved to LA, they bought a PlayStation and Salem had a hard time keeping their attention and "Who do you take, me or PS5?" was the expression that came to mind, and she began to produce it. However, Salem felt that the song "still lacked something," so she approached Walker and TXT, her collaborators from 2021, to complete the piece. Salem says, "Now that I have a great song, I am grateful to Playstation [sic] for the opportunity."

Yeonjun and Taehyun also commented: "We're very lucky to have the opportunity to sing in multiple languages, and we're always excited to take on new challenges. Salem created an irresistibly ear-catching, addictive song and it's certain a lot of us will be playing the song on repeat."

On March 30, 2022, Ilese posted a TikTok revealing that the song was originally titled "PS4" because she had written it before the PlayStation 5 was released. A user commented "you should do like ps5 then ps4 [sic] and keep going to the old ones" to which Ilese responded "this is a great idea, me or the ps3 [sic] coming soon". On April 2, 2022, Ilese posted a TikTok of the "PS3" variant, on April 10, she posted a TikTok of the "PS2" variant, on April 16, she posted a TikTok of the "Xbox X" variant, and on April 20, she posted a TikTok of the "PS1" variant. On July 6, Ilese digitally released the "PS5 Super Pack", which compiled the versions that had been previously released on TikTok.

== Music video ==
On August 9, 2022, the music video for the song was released. It features YouTube creator Ted Nivision and Salem Ilese in a mid-century modern home together. Ted plays a game on the TV that features a pixel avatar of Salem Ilese. The music video was directed by Christina Xing and produced by Our Secret Handshake, with pixel art done by Reshma Zachariah.

== Track listing ==
Digital – single
No.	Title	Length
1.	"PS5"	2:32

Digital – EP
No.	Title	Length
1.	"PS5"	2:32
2.	"PS5" (Fortnite Battle Pass Gamer remix)	2:28
3.	"PS5" (PS4 version)	2:12
4.	"PS5" (PS3 version)	2:12
5.	"PS5" (PS2 version)	2:12
6.	"PS5" (PS1 version)	2:12
7.	"PS5" (Xbox X version)	2:12
8.	"PS5" (Nintendo Switch version)	2:12
Total length:		18:14

== Charts ==
Chart performance for "PS5"
Chart (2022)	Peak position
New Zealand Hot Singles (RMNZ)	38
South Korea (Gaon)	170
Vietnam Hot 100 (Billboard)	61
