= Headlights (Alok and Alan Walker song) =

2022 song by Alok and Alan Walker

Single by Alok and Alan Walker featuring Kiddo
- Released: 18 February 2022
- Genre: Dance
- Label: Controversia
- Songwriters: Mats Lie Skåre; Gunnar Greve; Marcus Arnbekk; Emma Bertilsson; Erik Smaaland; Øyvind Sauvik; Ohyes; Fredrick Borch Olsen; Kristoffer Chaka Bwanausi-Tømmerbakke; Alok Achkar Peres Petrillo; Alan Olav Walker

Alok singles chronology
"Keep Walking" (2022)	"Headlights" (2022)	"Meu Amor" (2022)

Alan Walker singles chronology
"Hello World" (2022)	"Headlights" (2022)	"PS5" (2022)

Music video
- "Headlights" on YouTube

"Headlights" is a song recorded by Brazilian DJ Alok and British-Norwegian record producer and DJ Alan Walker featuring Swedish singer Olivia Helena Bertilsson (KIDDO), released by Controversia on 18 February 2022. The song saw a resurgence in 2026 through apps such as TikTok and YouTube Shorts.

Alok released a remix of the track, "Headlights (Udta Jaaye)" for the promotion of the video game Garena Free Fire, featuring Indian musicians Rashmeet Kaur and Krsna.

== Background ==
Speaking on the track, Alok stated: "I'm super excited to be collaborating with Alan on our first original collaboration and this time on my Controversia imprint makes it feel all the more special! We worked together to bring our signature sounds into the fold for our fans and having KIDDO's unique vocal also on this release added something so distinctive and fresh."

Speaking on the release, Walker said: "This is the first time around working on a project with Alok, and I couldn't be happier to be collaborating. Being able to create music alongside other DJs and talented singers like Kiddo, whose unique voice perfectly fit this track, is always a pleasure. It has truly been a fun process combining our styles into this song and I can't wait to continue experimenting!"

== Critical reception ==
Nick of EDM Sauce says, "The palatial intro beat captivates with its toe-tapping synth-line melody, then the militant-style drums call for attention and the pulsating tempo pushes the listener onward, while KIDDO's far reaching, deep vocal tone adds richness and complex dexterity. The presence of each artist adds richness and intricate dexterity, creating a stunning production that evolves with each listen.

EDM Honey's Jake Williams writes, "This track is a breath of fresh new air, blending the unique sounds of Alok and Alan Walker. Both are known as melodic masters, and this is even more evident on this track, which is further elevated by Kiddo's vocals. Fun and fresh, the song packs a punch with its energy and sizzling synths, creating the ultimate party anthem overall." stated.

Ale Mancinelli of EDM Lab says, "The result is a true 50-50 kind of thing. In fact, the Anglo-Norwegian's poetic synth lines and Alok's bass are in perfect harmony. It gets better with the addition of vocalists like the Swede Kiddo.

== Charts ==
Chart performance for "Headlights"
Chart (2022)	Peak position
Norway (VG-lista)	15
Sweden Heatseeker (Sverigetopplistan)	59
Turkey (Radiomonitor Türkiye)	4
US Hot Dance/Electronic Songs (Billboard)	23

== Certifications ==
Certifications for "Headlights"
Region	Certification	Certified units/sales
Brazil (Pro-Música Brasil)	Gold	20,000^{‡}
France (SNEP)	Gold	100,000^{‡}
Poland (ZPAV)	Platinum	125,000^{‡}
^{‡} Sales+streaming figures based on certification alone.
