= No Labels: Part 02 =

2026 EP by Yeonjun

EP by Yeonjun
- Released: July 10, 2026
- Genres: Rap rock; punk rock; R&B; pop; alternative hip-hop
- Length: 16:09
- Languages: Korean; English
- Label: BigHit
- Producers: Slow Rabbit; "Hitman" Bang; Mikhail "Misha" Ellis; Pdogg; Ojivolta; Dave Hamelin; Aldae; Julia Lewis; Joe Reeves; Pxpillon

Yeonjun chronology
| No Labels: Part 01 (2025) | No Labels: Part 02 (2026) |

Singles from No Labels: Part 02
- 1. "Ice Cream" Released: July 10, 2026

No Labels: Part 02 is the second extended play (EP) by South Korean singer Yeonjun, released on July 10, 2026, through BigHit Music.

== Background ==
Yeonjun revealed he felt less pressured during the production of his second EP after seeing his fan's reactions to No Labels: Part 01. He said that there has been no label that describes himself and that the only label that describes him in the long run was his own name. He stressed that it was difficult to come up with a good choreography and making music that reflects him.

== Release and promotion ==
In June 2026, BigHit Music announced that Yeonjun would release an EP the following month. To promote the EP, he opened an ice cream-themed popup, where merchandise, towels, and water bottles were sold. In a preview, it was described as rap rock, punk rock, R&B, pop and alternative hip-hop. In the first week, the EP sold 738,000 copies, setting a new record for 2026.

== Track listing ==
No Labels: Part 02 track listing
| No. | Title | Writer(s) | Producers | Length |
|---|---|---|---|---|
| 1. | "Vanilla" | "Hitman" Bang; Mikhail "Misha" Ellis; Kareen Lomax; Pete Nappi; Ellie Suh; Jiggy; Suan; 이은화; 한성은; 임수란; 전율이; Sokodomo; 이리듬; Danke | Slow Rabbit; Bang; Misha | 2:34 |
| 2. | "Ice Cream" | Misha; Slow Rabbit; Rachel West; Bang; Supreme Boi | Misha; Slow Rabbit | 2:04 |
| 3. | "Baby Wassup?" (조금 서툴러도 다시) | Yeonjun; Pdogg; Raul Cubina; Mark Williams; Beau Nox | Pdogg; Ojivolta | 2:54 |
| 4. | "No More Disco" | Dave Hamelin; Raquel Castro; Gregory Aldae Hein | Hamelin; Aldae | 2:40 |
| 5. | "Fxxking Star" | Joe Reeves; Duckwrth; Anthony Watts; Misha; Benjamin Falik; Bang | Julia Lewis; Reeves | 3:04 |
| 6. | "Long Way Long Ride" | Yeonjun; Slow Rabbit; Pxpillon; Misha | Slow Rabbit; Pxpillon | 2:50 |
| Total length: | | | | 16:09 |

== Charts ==
=== Weekly charts ===
Weekly chart performance for No Labels: Part 02
| Chart (2026) | Peak position |
|---|---|
| Australian Albums (ARIA) | 72 |
| Belgian Albums (Ultratop Flanders) | 53 |
| Belgian Albums (Ultratop Wallonia) | 104 |
| French Albums (SNEP) | 119 |
| Greek Albums (IFPI) | 92 |
| Japanese Albums (Oricon) | 2 |
| Japanese Combined Albums (Oricon) | 2 |
| Japanese Hot Albums (Billboard Japan) | 4 |
| South Korean Albums (Circle) | 1 |
| UK Album Downloads (Official Charts) | 84 |
| US Billboard 200 | 16 |
| US World Albums (Billboard) | 1 |

=== Monthly charts ===
Monthly chart performance for No Labels: Part 02
| Chart (2026) | Position |
|---|---|
| Japanese Albums (Oricon) | 11 |
| South Korean Albums (Circle) | 1 |
