= The Star Chapter: Together =

- Digital cover

Studio album by Tomorrow X Together
- Released: July 21, 2025
- Length: 21:52
- Languages: Korean; English
- Labels: BigHit; Republic
- Producers: "Hitman" Bang; Beomgyu; Tommy Driscoll; FnZ; Davin Kingston; Maiz; Martin; Paul Meany; Pxpillon; Johny Simpson; Slow Rabbit; Slush Puppy; Jake Torrey; Yungblud

Tomorrow X Together chronology
The Star Chapter: Sanctuary (2024)	The Star Chapter: Together (2025)	Starkissed (2025)

Singles from The Star Chapter: Together
- 1. "Beautiful Strangers" Released: July 21, 2025

The Star Chapter: Together (Korean: 별의장: Together; RR: Byeoruijang: Together) is the fourth Korean-language studio album by South Korean boy band Tomorrow X Together. It was released on July 21, 2025, through BigHit Music and Republic Records. The album marks the second and final installment of the band's Star Chapter series.

== Release and promotion ==
On June 25, 2025, the band's YouTube channel posted a three-hour livestream titled The Star Chapter: Star in Daylight, which featured the members' zodiac signs and several lines related to the Star Seekers Universe. The following day, Tomorrow X Together announced the release of their first studio album in two years, following The Name Chapter: Freefall (2023). The announcement was shared through the global platform Weverse. Pre-orders were made available upon the announcement. Arriving a year after the release of The Star Chapter: Sanctuary, it is set to continue and conclude the Star Chapter narrative. This narrative began with a reunion storyline, followed by a transformation and will be finalized with this studio album. In an accompanying teaser clip, the band introduced a new star-shaped logo featuring three neon stars side by side, as the logo from the previous EP series faded.

To promote the record, Tomorrow X Together embarked on their fourth world tour, Act: Tomorrow, which kicked off in South Korea on August 22, 2025, as announced on June 20.

== Critical reception ==
Rhian Daly of NME gave the album four out of five stars, highlighting each of the members' solo songs and stating the album "explores togetherness from largely individual standpoints".

Professional ratings
Review scores
Source	Rating
NME	4/5 stars

== Track listing ==
The Star Chapter: Together track listing
No.	Title	Writer(s)	Producer(s)	Length
1.	"Upside Down Kiss"	Slow Rabbit; "Hitman" Bang; Anthony Watts; Feli Ferraro; FnZ; Gino the Ghost; JBach; Marcus Lomax; Slush Puppy; Misha; Danke; Hybe; BHM; Yeonjun; Sokodomo; Zaya (153/Joombas); Lee Yi-jin; Lee Eun-hwa (153/Joombas); Lee Aeng-du (153/Joombas); Kim Chae-ah (153/Joombas); Eillie Suh (153/Joombas); Choi Bo-ra (153/Joombas)	FnZ; Slush Puppy; Slow Rabbit; Bang	2:15
2.	"Beautiful Strangers"	Slow Rabbit; Bang; Jordan Shaw; Neil Ormandy; Jenson Vaughan; Martin; BHM; Zaya; Na Jung-ah (153/Joombas); Mia (153/Joombas)	Slow Rabbit; Bang; Martin	2:18
3.	"Ghost Girl" (solo by Yeonjun)	Dominic Harrison; Paul Meany; Jake Torrey; Yeonjun; Jo Yoon-kyung; Woo Seung-yeon (153/Joombas); Danke; Kim Bo-eun (Jamfactory); Na; Maiz; Suh; Lee Seu-ran; BHM; Lee A.; Kim C.; Lee E.	Yungblud; Meany; Torrey	3:06
4.	"Sunday Driver" (solo by Soobin)	Maiz; Henrik Heaven; Daniel Davila; Jason Strong; January 8th; Choi; Lee S.; Jack Harvey; Na; Wiljam; Kim In-hyung; BHM; Jo; Danke; Tim Tan; Woo; Kim C.; Lee E.; Lee A.; Lee Y.; Jeon Ji-eun; Slow Rabbit; Grant "Yog$" Yarber; Nicky Youre	Maiz	2:47
5.	"Dance with You" (solo by Hueningkai)	Alex Nobile; Kella Armitage; Ori Rose; Tommy Driscoll; Suh; Kim B.; Kim I.; Jo; Danke; Na; Lee Y.	Driscoll	2:20
6.	"Take My Half" (solo by Beomgyu)	Slow Rabbit; Pxpillon; Adam Argyle; Iain James; Beomgyu; Hwang Yu-bin; Suh; January 8th; Danke; Lee Y.; Jo; Woo; Kim B.; Na; Kim I.	Slow Rabbit; Pxpillon; Beomgyu	2:56
7.	"Bird of Night" (solo by Taehyun)	Ben Samama; Davin Kingston; Michael Gerow; Sara Davis; Slow Rabbit; Taehyun; Lee S.; True (153/Joombas); Choi B.; Jo; Danke; Woo; Jeon; Suh; Lee Y.; Danke2; Na; Kim I.	Kingston; Slow Rabbit	2:42
8.	"Song of the Stars" (별의 노래)	Torrey; Johny Simpson; Pxpillon; Davis; BHM; Kim I.; Lee Y.; David Alexander; Kim B.; Hwang; Danke; Zaya; January 8th	Simpson; Pxpillon	3:26
Total length:				21:52

The Star Chapter: Together Physical edition bonus track - CD only
No.	Title	Writer(s)	Producer(s)	Length
9.	"Love Language"	Slow Rabbit; The Elements; SHORELLE; danke; Ellie Suh; Kim Bo Eun; Hueningkai; Yiyijin; Hwang Yu Bin; Woo Seung Yeon; Cho Yun Kyoung; January 8th; Na Jung Ah	The Elements; Slow Rabbit	2:58
Total length:				24:50

== Charts ==
=== Weekly charts ===
Weekly chart performance
Chart (2025–2026)	Peak position
Austrian Albums (Ö3 Austria)	11
Belgian Albums (Ultratop Flanders)	28
Belgian Albums (Ultratop Wallonia)	75
Croatian International Albums (HDU)	15
French Albums (SNEP)	17
German Albums (Offizielle Top 100)	9
Greek Albums (IFPI)	6
Hungarian Albums (MAHASZ)	32
Japanese Albums (Oricon)	1
Japanese Combined Albums (Oricon)	1
Japanese Hot Albums (Billboard Japan)	1
Polish Albums (ZPAV)	14
Portuguese Albums (AFP)	13
South Korean Albums (Circle)	1
Swiss Albums (Schweizer Hitparade)	86
UK Album Downloads (Official Charts)	37
US Billboard 200	3
US World Albums (Billboard)	1

=== Monthly charts ===
Monthly chart performance
Chart (2025)	Position
Japanese Albums (Oricon)	3
South Korean Albums (Circle)	1

=== Year-end charts ===
Year-end chart performance
Chart (2025)	Position
Japanese Albums (Oricon)	9
Japanese Combined Albums (Oricon)	9
Japanese Hot Albums (Billboard Japan)	78
South Korean Albums (Circle)	5
US World Albums (Billboard)	14

== Certifications ==
Certifications
Region	Certification	Certified units/sales
Japan (RIAJ)	2× Platinum	500,000^{^}
South Korea (KMCA)	Million	1,000,000^{^}
^{^} Shipments figures based on certification alone.

== Release history ==
Release history
Region	Date	Format	Label
Various	July 21, 2025	Digital download; streaming	BigHit; Republic
South Korea	July 21, 2025	CD	BigHit
Various	July 25, 2025	CD	BigHit; Republic
