= Starkissed (album) =

Studio album by Tomorrow X Together
- Released: October 20, 2025
- Length: 33:23
- Languages: Japanese; English
- Labels: BigHit; Universal Japan

Tomorrow X Together chronology
The Star Chapter: Together (2025)	Starkissed (2025)	7th Year: A Moment of Stillness in the Thorns (2026)

Tomorrow X Together Japanese chronology
Sweet (2023)	Starkissed (2025)

Singles from Starkissed
- 1. "Can't Stop" Released: October 20, 2025

Starkissed is the third Japanese-language studio album (seventh overall) by South Korean boy band Tomorrow X Together. It was released by BigHit Entertainment and Universal Music Japan on October 20, 2025. The album contains twelve tracks, with the lead single from the album "Can't Stop". The album was commercially successful, debuting at number-one on Billboard Japan Top Album Sales chart with 330,279 copies.

== Background and release ==
Starkissed, Tomorrow X Together's third Japanese album, was announced by BigHit Music on August 20, 2025. The announcement mentioned that the album would be released on October 20, and that it would contain twelve tracks including three new original Japanese songs, and Japanese version of the band's Korean-language songs such as "Beautiful Stranger" and "Song of the Star".

"Can't Stop" was released as the album's lead single on October 20, with a music video released simultaneously with the track and the album.

== Commercial performance ==
The album debuted at the top on Oricon Albums Chart selling 318,000 copies marking the band's highest weekly sales on Oricon surpassing their previous record set by The Star Chapter: Together at 304,000 copies. The title track "Can't Stop" ranked number-one on Oricon’s Daily Digital Single Ranking chart.

== Track listing ==
Track listing and credits adapted from the album's liner notes.

Starkissed track listing
No.	Title	Writer(s)	Producer(s)	Length
1.	"Intro: Spark"	Pxpillon; Slow Rabbit	Pxpillon; Slow Rabbit	1:34
2.	"Can't Stop"	Daniel Seavey; David Wilson; Jbach; Jordan Shaw; Ohashi Chippoke; Slow Rabbit; Soma Genda	Slow Rabbit; Dwilly; Daniel Seavey	2:24
3.	"Beautiful Strangers" (Japanese ver.)	Slow Rabbit; "Hitman" Bang; Jordan Shaw; Neil Ormandy; Jenson Vaughan; Martin; BHM; Zaya (153/Joobas); Na Jung Ah (153/Joobas); Mia (153/Joobas)	Slow Rabbit; "Hitman" Bang; Martin	2:18
4.	"Where Do You Go?"	Evan Gartner; Ohashi Chippoke; Ori Rose; Sam Preston; Soma Genda	Evan Gartner; Sam Preston	3:07
5.	"Deja Vu" (Japanese ver.)	"Hitman" bang; Slow Rabbit; Martin; Supreme Boi; Ryan Lawrie; Moa "Cazzi Opeia" Carlebecker (Sunshine); Ellen Berg (Sunshine); James; Score (13); Megatone (13)	Slow Rabbit; Martin; "Hitman" Bang	2:51
6.	"We'll Never Change" (ひとつの誓い)	Slow Rabbit; "Hitman" Bang; Ohashi Chippoke; Jordan Shaw; Steven Lee; Sqvare; Soma Genda; Maiz	"Hitman" Bang; Slow Rabbit	2:55
7.	"SSS (Sending Secret Signals)"	Ali; Daisuke Nakamura; Hyde	Hyde; Ali; Daisuke Nakamura	3:07
8.	"Kitto Zutto" (きっとずっと)	Katsuhiko Sugiyama; Maiz; Hueningkai; Slow Rabbit; "Hitman" Bang	Hueningkai; Maiz; Slow Rabbit	2:51
9.	"Step by Step"	Eve	Eve; Numa; Zingai	3:24
10.	"Rise"	Momiken; U.Z	U.Z	3:25
11.	"Song of the Stars" (星の詩; Japanese ver.)	Slow Rabbit; "Hitman" Bang; Jordan Shaw; Neil Ormandy; Jenson Vaughan; Martin; BHM; Zaya (153/Joombas); Na Jung Ah (153/Joombas); Mia (153/Joombas)	Slow Rabbit; "Hitman" Bang; Martin	3:26
12.	"Outro: Glow"	Maiz; Slow Rabbit	Maiz; Slow Rabbit	1:56
Total length:				33:23

== Charts ==
Weekly chart performance for Starkissed
Chart (2025)	Peak position
Japanese Albums (Oricon)	1
Japanese Hot Albums (Billboard Japan)	1
