= The Dream Chapter: Eternity =

- Digital and Port version cover

EP by Tomorrow X Together
- Released: May 18, 2020
- Genres: Funk-pop; dream pop; trap; hip-hop; alt R&B
- Length: 22:07
- Language: Korean
- Labels: Big Hit; Republic
- Producers: Noah Conrad; "Hitman" Bang; Slow Rabbit; El Capitxn; Beomgyu; Sam Klempner; Frants

Tomorrow X Together chronology
The Dream Chapter: Magic (2019)	The Dream Chapter: Eternity (2020)	Minisode1: Blue Hour (2020)

Singles from The Dream Chapter: Eternity
- 1. "Can't You See Me?" Released: May 18, 2020; 2. "Puma" Released: June 3, 2020; 3. "Eternally" Released: June 29, 2020

The Dream Chapter: Eternity (Korean: 꿈의 장: Eternity; RR: Kkum-ui Jang: Iteoniti) is the second extended play (EP) by South Korean boy band Tomorrow X Together. It was released on May 18, 2020 by Big Hit Entertainment and Republic Records. It serves as a follow-up to the band's first studio album The Dream Chapter: Magic (2019). The album contains six songs, including the lead single, "Can't You See Me?". Musically, the album incorporates several genres including funk-pop, dreampop, trap, hip-hop and alternative R&B.

Commercially, the album debuted atop Japan's Oricon Albums Chart, becoming their first chart-topper in the country. It debuted at number two on the Gaon Album Chart becoming the band's third consecutive top five album and charted on the Billboard World Albums chart at number four. In July 2020, the album was certified platinum by the Korea Music Content Association (KMCA), becoming their first certification in South Korea since debut. To promote the album, Tomorrow X Together appeared on several South Korean music programs including M! Countdown, Music Bank and Inkigayo.

== Background ==
Tomorrow X Together's comeback was much-anticipated after the band won several rookie awards at year-end Korean award shows, including Mnet Asian Music Awards, MelOn Music Awards, and Golden Disc Awards. On April 28, 2020, Big Hit Entertainment announced the upcoming release of Tomorrow X Together's second EP, The Dream Chapter: Eternity, through a motion graphics video teaser. It follows the band's debut extended play The Dream Chapter: Star and their first studio album The Dream Chapter: Magic which together comprise their successful "The Dream Chapter" series featuring stories of growth.

The Dream Chapter: Star, our debut album, was about the "happiness and excitement of meeting that special someone." The Dream Chapter: Magic was about our magical adventures that we set on as a group of friends. Our newest, The Dream Chapter: Eternity carries on that story -- our group of friends hits a wall as we confront reality.

— Tomorrow X Together on The Dream Chapter: Eternity, Billboard.

== Music and lyrics ==
The Dream Chapter: Eternity is thematically a continuation of the band's concept of growth and explores the darker side of youth and friendship. Lyrically, the concept album is about "facing troubles in relationships" and has a theme of self-reflection. The Dream Chapter: Eternity consists of six songs and is musically diverse with a wide range of genres including funk-pop, dreampop, trap, hip-hop and alternative R&B. The album's lead single, "Can't You See Me?" is a trap and pop song based on a "thumping pop synth". It features grunge-influenced chord progression and a piano melody. The lyrics detail the confusion and emotional turmoil when a young person encounters a conflicting phase in friendship and relationship. "Drama" is a funk-pop song with a "funky" guitar rhythm and an "addictive" melody. It derives from piano and brass instrumentation. The third track on the album is a remake of Light & Salt's 1990 classic single, "Fairy of Shampoo". The jazz-pop song was arranged in dreampop genre with a capella vocal harmonies and synthesizer instrumentation, and features a new rap written by Yeonjun. "Maze in the Mirror" has lyrics co-written by all the band members. It was co-produced by Beomgyu and Big Hit's in-house producer Slow Rabbit. It is an acoustic Britpop track for which guitar, piano and bass provide minimalist instrumentation. The lyrics were inspired by the experiences the band had as trainees. "Puma" is an intense hip-hop and trap song with "simple" musical composition. "Eternally" is an alternative R&B song which starts in an acoustic pop style and shifts into darker beats. It features repetitive melody and minimalist fragmented sounds.

== Release and promotion ==
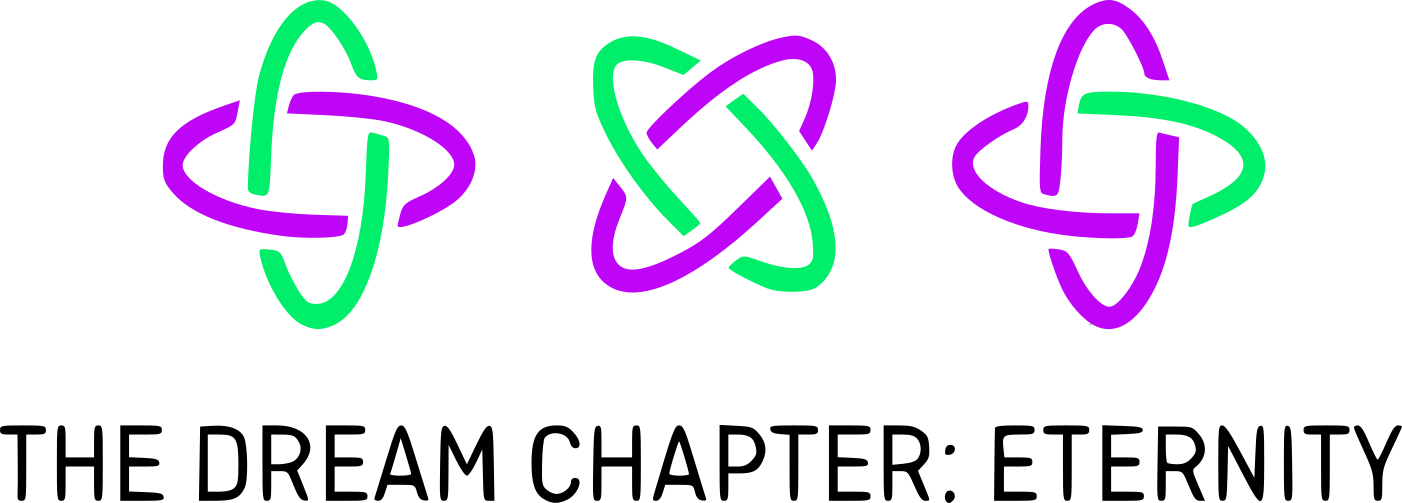
The band's modified logo used for promotional activities

On April 29, the band released a concept trailer of The Dream Chapter: Eternity. It shows the five members sitting together around a round table. Gradually, Soobin begins to distance himself from the rest and finds himself trapped in a transparent glass box. The teaser ends with the words, "save me". On April 30, a concept photo teaser was released featuring a shabby plush toy in frame of surrealist painter René Magritte's famous painting The Treachery of Images (1929). The caption is a French sentence which translates to 'This is not a teddy bear'. From May 1 to May 4, the band released two versions of concept photos- "Port" and "Starboard", both done up in manner of a social media feed. The "Port" version represents "cracks among friends" while the "Starboard" version depicts "the appearance of the boys longing for eternity." The full album tracklist and digital cover art were released through Big Hit's SNS account on May 5. On May 7, solo teaser videos of Yeonjun and Beomgyu were released for the EP's lead single "Can't You See Me?" On May 8, individual teasers for Taehyun, Huening Kai and Soobin were released. On May 11, the first group teaser for the music video of the lead single "Can't You See Me?" was released. The second group teaser of the music video was released on May 13. On May 15, an album preview was released featuring a snippet of each track along with concept photos and a concept sketch video. The album was released on May 18, 2020, in CD and digital formats. An accompanying music video for the lead single, "Can't You See Me?" was released in conjunction with the release of the album. The video is metaphorical and depicts the group in a darker ambience as opposed to their previous music videos and portrays the pain of friendship becoming distant.

On May 18, a few hours prior to the album release, the band held a media showcase at the Yes24 Live Hall, Gwangjin-gu, Seoul, which was broadcast online on YouTube. Hours after the album's release, a special "Comeback Show", hosted by Mnet was premiered live worldwide, where they performed "Can't You See Me?" and B-side tracks "Drama" and "Fairy of Shampoo" for the first time. The band promoted the album with a series of live performances on various music programs starting with Mnet's M! Countdown on May 21. They also promoted the songs on KBS's Music Bank, SBS 's Inkigayo, SBS MTV's The Show. and MBC Music's Show Champion. In the second week of promotion, "Can't You See Me?" won first place on The Show and Show Champion. On May 22, Tomorrow X Together made their first appearance on MTV Fresh Out Live where they performed "Can't You See Me?". The band again performed the song on May 27 episode of the variety show Weekly Idol, alongside their previous singles "Crown" and "9 and Three Quarters (Run Away)".

== Reception ==
Professional ratings
Review scores
Source	Rating
NME	4/5 stars

In his review for NME, Rhian Daly gave the album four out of five stars writing, "Until now, Tomorrow X Together’s output has mostly been bright, breezy and blissfully free from life’s worries, focusing more on fantasy and fun. Taking a different tact, [sic] though, has left them with an EP that is, for the most part, enriched by its embrace of the clashes we all go through." Chris Gillett of South China Morning Post praised the band's songwriting and stated, "In The Dream Chapter: Eternity, the popular K-pop five-piece delivers another solid, varied set of songs to sing along to."

Commercially, The Dream Chapter: Eternity debuted at number two on the Gaon Album Chart, selling over 181,000 copies in its first week and giving Tomorrow X Together their third consecutive top five album in South Korea. The album topped Japan's Oricon Albums Chart on the chart issue dated May 24, 2020, becoming the band's first chart-topper in the country. In addition, the album charted on the Billboard World Albums chart at number four and number nine on the Heatseekers Albums chart. All tracks from the album entered the World Digital Songs chart with "Can't You See Me?" charting at number two. The Dream Chapter: Eternity was the fourth best-selling album of May 2020 in South Korea, selling 247,153 physical copies. In July 2020, the album received a platinum certification from the Korea Music Content Association (KMCA), denoting 250,000 shipments, giving Tomorrow X Together their first certification in the country since debut.

== Track listing ==
Credits adapted from the album's preview video.

The Dream Chapter: Eternity track listing
No.	Title	Writer(s)	Producer(s)	Length
1.	"Drama"	Supreme Boi; Jake Torry; Noah Conrad; Roland "Rollo" Spreckley; El Capitxn	Noah Conrad	3:30
2.	"Can't You See Me?" (세계가 불타버린 밤, 우린…^{[a]})	Slow Rabbit; "Hitman" Bang; Supreme Boi; Melanie Joy Fontana; Michel "Lindgren" Schulz; Eric Zayne; Naz Tokoi	Bang; Slow Rabbit	3:21
3.	"Fairy of Shampoo^{[b]}" (샴푸의 요정^{[c]})	El Capitxn; Slow Rabbit; Keeho Chang; Yeonjun	El Capitxn; Slow Rabbit	4:27
4.	"Maze in the Mirror" (거울 속의 미로^{[d]})	Slow Rabbit; Yeonjun; Beomgyu; Adora; HueningKai; Soobin; Taehyun	Slow Rabbit; Beomgyu	3:46
5.	"Puma" (동물원을 빠져나온 퓨마^{[e]})	Sam Klempner; Supreme Boi; Fontana; Schulz; Slow Rabbit; Krysta Youngs; Julia Ross	Klempner	3:26
6.	"Eternally"	Frants; Supreme Boi; Slow Rabbit; Pauline Skott; Peter St James; Alina Paulsen; Chris Brenner; Bang; Danke	Frants	3:37
Total length:				22:07

Notes

- ^[a] Segyega bultabeorin bam, urin… lit. "The night the world burned, we…"
- ^[b] "Fairy of Shampoo" is a remake of the song by Light & Salt.
- ^[c] Syampu-ui yojeong
- ^[d] Geoul sog-ui miro
- ^[e] Dongmulwon-eul ppajyeonaon pyuma lit. "Puma fleeing the zoo"

== Personnel ==
Credits adapted from NetEase Music and Tidal.

- TXT – vocals
  - Yeonjun – background vocals (track 1, 5)
  - Soobin – background vocals (track 1-2)
  - Beomgyu – associated performer (track 4), recording arranger (track 4)
  - Taehyun – background vocals (track 1)
  - Huening Kai – background vocals (track 2)
- Jake Torry – background vocals (track 1)
- Melanie Joy Fontana – background vocals (track 2, 5)
- Loren Smith – background vocals (track 3)
- Greg Whipple – background vocals (track 3)
- Durell Anthony – background vocals (track 3)
- Adora – background vocals (track 4, 6), vocal arrangement (track 4, 6), digital editing (track 4), recording engineer (track 4, 6)
- Julia Ross – background vocals (track 5)
- Supreme Boi – background vocals (track 5), vocal arrangement (track 5), digital editing (track 5)
- Ruuth – background vocals (track 6)
- Slow Rabbit – vocal arrangement (track 1-2, 4-6), keyboard (track 2, 4-5), synthesizer (track 2, 4-6), digital editing (track 1-2, 6), recording engineer (track 1-2, 4-6), associated performer (track 2-4), recording arranger (track 2-4)
- El Capitxn – vocal arrangement (track 3), keyboard (track 1, 3), synthesizer (track 1, 3), digital editing (track 3), recording engineer (track 3), associated performer (track 3), recording arranger (track 3)
- Frants – vocal arrangement (track 6), keyboard (track 6), synthesizer (track 6), digital editing (track 6)
- Rosaleen Rhee – interpreter (track 3)
- Duane Benjamin – background vocal arrangement (track 3)
- Pauline Skött – additional vocal arrangement (track 6)
- Noah Conrad – vocal arrangement (track 6), synthesizer (track 1), associated performer (track 1), recording arranger (track 1)
- "Hitman" Bang – associated performer (track 2), recording arranger (track 2)
- Sam Klempner – associated performer (track 5), recording arranger (track 5)
- Young – guitar (track 1-2, 4, 6)
- Choi Hyun-jong – guitar (track 1)
- Jeon Seung-hoon – bass (track 3)
- Jo Jung-hyun – trumpet (track 3), flagelhorn (track 3)
- nobody – bass (track 4)
- Sam Klempner – keyboard (track 5), synthesizer (track 5), drums (track 5)
- Ghstloop – digital editing (track 1)
- Kim Cho-rong – recording engineer (track 1, 4, 6)
- Kim Ji-yeon – recording engineer (track 1, 3-6)
- Noah Conrad – recording engineer (track 1)
- Jung Woo-yeong – recording engineer (track 2-5)
- Michel "Lindgren" Schulz – recording engineer (track 2, 5)
- Erik Reichers – recording engineer (track 3)
- Yang Ga – mixer (track 1, 6)
- Phil Tan – mixer (track 2)
- Hector Castillo – mixer (track 3)
- Bill Zimmerman – assistant mixer (track 2)
- Carlos Imperatori – assistant mixer (track 3)
- Park Jin-se – mixer (track 4)
- Jaycen Joshua – mixer (track 5)
- Jacob Richards – assistant mixer (track 5)
- Mike Seaberg – assistant mixer (track 5)
- DJ Riggins – assistant mixer (track 5)
- Chris Gehringer – mastering engineer (track 1-6)

== Charts ==
=== Weekly charts ===
Chart (2020)	Peak position
Lithuanian Albums (AGATA)	90
Japanese Albums (Oricon)	1
Polish Albums (ZPAV)	8
Scottish Albums (Official Charts)	96
South Korean Albums (Gaon)	2
US Heatseekers Albums (Billboard)	9
US World Albums (Billboard)	4

=== Monthly charts ===
Chart (2020)	Position
South Korean Albums (Gaon)	4

=== Year-end charts ===
Chart (2020)	Position
Japanese Albums (Oricon)	81
South Korean Albums (Gaon)	28

== Certifications ==
Certifications for The Dream Chapter: Eternity
Region	Certification	Certified units/sales
South Korea (KMCA)	2× Platinum	500,000^{^}
^{^} Shipments figures based on certification alone.

== Accolades ==
Year-end lists
Critic/Publication	List	Work	Rank	Ref.
Billboard	The 20 Best K-Pop Songs of 2020: Critics' Picks	"Can't You See Me?"	16	
Dazed	The 40 Best K-pop Songs of 2020	"Can't You See Me?"	27	
Paper	The 40 Best K-pop Songs of 2020	"Can't You See Me?"	7	

Music program wins
Song	Program	Date	Ref.
"Can’t You See Me?"	The Show (SBS MTV)	May 26, 2020	
"Can’t You See Me?"	Show Champion (MBC)	May 27, 2020	

== Release history ==
Country	Date	Format(s)	Label	Ref.
South Korea	May 18, 2020	CD	Big Hit	
Japan	May 18, 2020	CD	Big Hit; Universal Japan	
Various	May 18, 2020	CD; Digital download; streaming	Big Hit; Republic	
