= MattyBRaps =

American rapper (born 2003)

MattyB
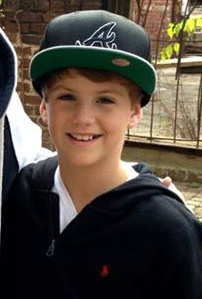
- MattyB in 2014

Background information
- Born: Matthew David Morris; January 6, 2003 (age 23); Duluth, Georgia, U.S.
- Origin: Suwanee, Georgia, U.S.
- Genres: Teen pop; pop-rap; pop-folk
- Occupations: Singer; rapper
- Years active: 2010–present
- Labels: MattyB, LLC
- Website: mattybraps.com

Matthew David Morris (born January 6, 2003), better known as MattyB or MattyBRaps, is an American rapper, singer, and YouTuber. He launched his career at a young age by creating covers of popular music and posting them to YouTube.

Morris has released numerous covers of mainstream music since he began his career in 2010. His first cover was of "Eenie Meenie" by Sean Kingston and Justin Bieber. On August 1, 2014, MattyB's YouTube channel surpassed one billion views. As of July 13, 2015, he has posted over 90 additional covers and 20 original songs on his YouTube channel.

== Life and career ==
Morris was born on January 6, 2003, in Duluth, Georgia, and has three older brothers and a younger sister.

In late 2012, he peaked at 11 on the Billboard Social 50 Chart with the music video for "That's the Way", which doubled his number of followers on social media sites Facebook, Twitter and YouTube. On August 27, 2015, his debut EP premiered on YouTube, titled Outside the Lines, which consists of four original songs. On June 7, 2016, Morris released a memoir, That's a Rap, with writer Travis Thrasher.

Morris has made several appearances on television, including Today, and The Wendy Williams Show.
