= Minisode 2: Thursday's Child =

- Digital and Hate version cover

EP by Tomorrow X Together
- Released: May 9, 2022
- Genres: Rock; hip-hop; pop
- Length: 15:06
- Language: Korean
- Labels: BigHit; Republic
- Producers: Slow Rabbit; Sam Klempner; Brian Phillips; AObeats; Jason Hahns; El Capitxn; Beomgyu; Revin

Tomorrow X Together chronology
Chaotic Wonderland (2021)	Minisode 2: Thursday's Child (2022)	The Name Chapter: Temptation (2023)

Singles from Minisode 2: Thursday's Child
- 1. "Good Boy Gone Bad" Released: May 9, 2022

Professional ratings
Review scores
Source	Rating
NME	5/5 stars

Minisode 2: Thursday's Child is the fourth Korean-language extended play (EP) (fifth overall) by South Korean boy band Tomorrow X Together. It was released on May 9, 2022, through BigHit Music and Republic Records. Centered on an "intense" and "dark" concept, the EP consists of five tracks, including the lead single "Good Boy Gone Bad".

== Background ==
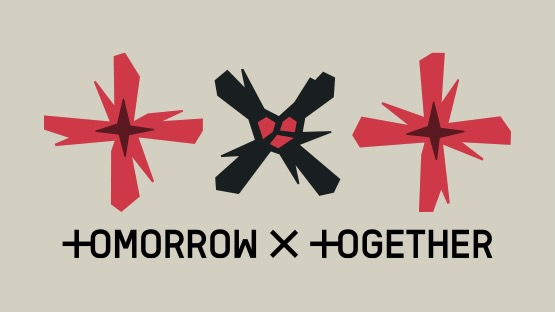
The band's modified logo used for promotional activities

On April 6, 2022, BigHit Music announced that Tomorrow X Together would make a comeback in early May.

== Critical reception ==
NME in the review called Thursday’s Child, "another leap forward for TXT," displaying their "continued inventiveness and improvement," while adding yet more creative credits to their resumes. They also noted that the EP captures the band's "journey of romantic grief," from the stormy "Opening Sequence" to the anger in "Good Boy Gone Bad".

Thursday’s Child was named the eighth-best K-pop album of 2022 by Billboard, sharing how the group "cover a lot of stylistic ground in just 15 minutes on 'Minisode 2: Thursday’s Child'" while mentioning "Good Boy Gone Bad," "Thursday's Child Has Far to Go" and "Trust Fund Baby" as standouts.

== Commercial performance ==
On April 20, 2022, the pre-orders for Minisode 2: Thursday's Child surpassed 810,000 copies, six days after the announcement, exceeding the band's previous career high of 520,000 pre-orders for The Chaos Chapter: Freeze. The EP surpassed 1.44 million pre-orders on the day of release and sold 910,000 copies on its first day after release.

== Track listing ==
Minisode 2: Thursday's Child track listing
No.	Title	Writer(s)	Producer(s)	Length
1.	"Opening Sequence"	Koda; Sam Klempner; Bryn Christopher; Supreme Boi; Slow Rabbit; Lee Seu-ran; Hueningkai; January 8th; Taehyun; Danke; Yi Yi-jin	Klempner	2:58
2.	"Good Boy Gone Bad"	Slow Rabbit; Supreme Boi; Moa "Cazzi Opeia" Carlebecker; Ellen Berg; BigHit Music; Melanie Joy Fontana; Michel "Lindgren" Schulz; "Hitman" Bang; Yeonjun; Blvsh; Chris James; Jo Yoon-kyung	Slow Rabbit	3:12
3.	"Trust Fund Baby"	Cate Downey; BigHit Music; Slow Rabbit; Danke; Brian Phillips; Taehyun; Yi; Yeonjun; Hwang Yu-bin; Kim In-hyung	Phillips; Slow Rabbit	2:36
4.	"Lonely Boy" (네 번째 손가락 위타투; Ne Bonjjae Songarak Witatu; lit. 'The tattoo on my ring finger') (sung by Yeonjun and Huening Kai)	Jason Hahns; Andrew Okamura; Yeonjun; El Capitxn; Huening Kai	AObeats; Hahns; El Capitxn	2:49
5.	"Thursday's Child Has Far to Go" (sung by Soobin, Beomgyu, and Taehyun)	Slow Rabbit; Beomgyu; Revin; Jo; Gabriel Brandes; Matt Thomson; Max Lynedoch Graham; Taehyun; "Hitman" Bang; Song Jae-kyung; January 8th; Moa "Cazzi Opeia" Carlebecker; Ninos Hanna; Fontana; Schulz; Alexander Karlsson; Nermin Harambašić; Danke; Hwang	Beomgyu; Slow Rabbit; Revin	3:31
Total length:				15:16

== Charts ==
=== Weekly charts ===
Chart performance for Minisode 2: Thursday's Child
Chart (2022)	Peak position
Austrian Albums (Ö3 Austria)	11
Belgian Albums (Ultratop Flanders)	14
Belgian Albums (Ultratop Wallonia)	12
Canadian Albums (Billboard)	44
Croatian International Albums (HDU)	3
Danish Albums (Hitlisten)	39
Finnish Albums (Suomen virallinen lista)	5
French Albums (SNEP)	9
German Albums (Offizielle Top 100)	14
Hungarian Albums (MAHASZ)	3
Japanese Albums (Oricon)	1
Japanese Hot Albums (Billboard Japan)	1
Polish Albums (ZPAV)	2
South Korean Albums (Gaon)	1
Spanish Albums (PROMUSICAE)	46
Swedish Physical Albums (Sverigetopplistan)	3
Swiss Albums (Schweizer Hitparade)	14
US Billboard 200	4
US World Albums (Billboard)	1

=== Monthly charts ===
Monthly chart performance
Chart (2022)	Peak position
Japanese Albums (Oricon)	4
South Korean Albums (Gaon)	2

=== Year-end charts ===
Year-end chart performance
Chart (2022)	Position
French Albums (SNEP)	183
Japanese Albums (Oricon)	24
Japanese Hot Albums (Billboard Japan)	33
South Korea (Circle)	7
US Billboard 200	192

== Certifications ==
Certifications for Minisode 2: Thursday's Child
Region	Certification	Certified units/sales
Japan (RIAJ)	Gold	179,421
South Korea (KMCA)	2× Million	2,000,000^{^}
^{^} Shipments figures based on certification alone.

== Release history ==
Release formats for Minisode 2: Thursday's Child
Region	Date	Format(s)	Label(s)	Ref.
Various	May 9, 2022	CD; digital download; streaming	BigHit	
Various	May 9, 2022	CD; digital download; streaming	Republic	
