= Taehyun (singer) =

South Korean singer (born 2002)

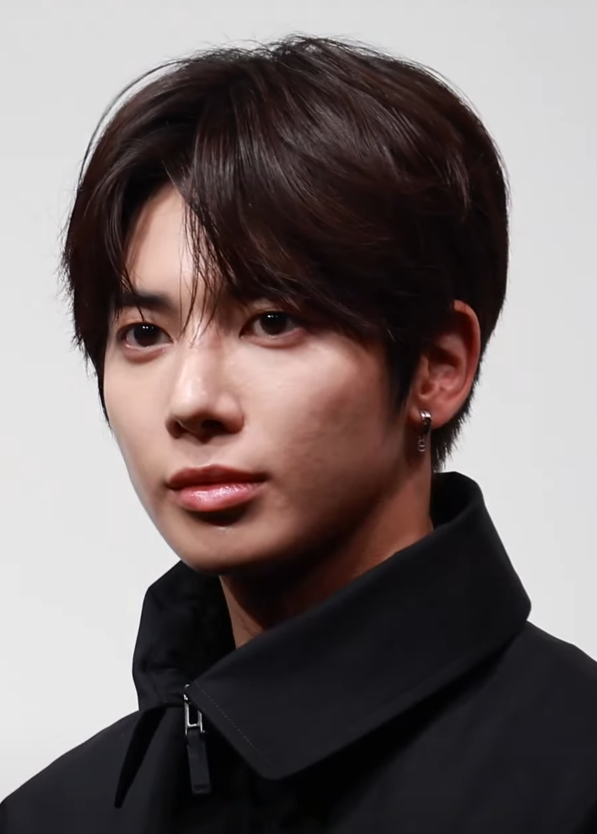
- Taehyun in April 2025
- Born: Kang Tae-hyun; February 5, 2002 (age 24); Seoul, South Korea
- Occupations: Singer; songwriter
- Years active: 2019–present
- Musical career
- Genre: K-pop
- Instrument: Vocals
- Label: Big Hit
- Member of: Tomorrow X Together

Korean name
- Hangul: 강태현
- RR: Gang Taehyeon
- MR: Kang T'aehyŏn

Signature
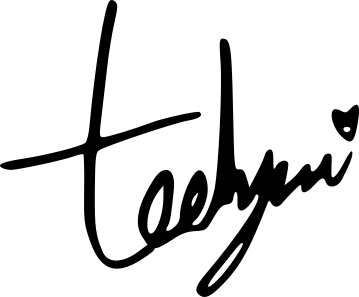

Kang Tae-hyun (Korean: 강태현; born February 5, 2002), known mononymously as Taehyun, is a South Korean singer and songwriter. He is a member of the South Korean boy band Tomorrow X Together, formed by Big Hit Entertainment in 2019.

== Early life and education ==
Taehyun was born on February 5, 2002 in Seoul, South Korea. He attended Hanlim Multi Art School.

== Career ==
=== 2019–present: Debut with Tomorrow X Together and solo activities ===
Taehyun was the fourth member of Tomorrow X Together to be revealed, having undergone three years of training with Big Hit Entertainment. The group debuted on March 4, 2019, with the extended play (EP) The Dream Chapter: Star. The EP peaked at number one on the Gaon Album Chart and Billboard World Albums Chart.

From January to May 2021, Taehyun co-hosted EBS radio show "Listen" with fellow member HueningKai. In February 2022, Taehyun featured on the single "PS5" by American singer-songwriter Salem Ilese, alongside bandmate Yeonjun and Norwegian DJ Alan Walker.

In December 2023, Taehyun began hosting his first solo web variety show titled Academy Reincarnation. The show, produced by SK Broadband, features Taehyun visiting various academies to learn new skills.

In May 2024, Taehyun collaborated with Japanese singer and actor Tomohisa Yamashita for the song "Perfect Storm", which was featured in the Fuji TV drama "Blue Moment". On November 18, Taehyun and HueningKai released the single "Can't Stop" for the soundtrack of ENA series Brewing Love. On February 14, 2025, the pair also released the song "Surfing in the Moonlight" for the Netflix series Melo Movie. On July 10, Taehyun was featured alongside Kim Chaewon on Jvke's single "Butterflies".

In August 2025, Taehyun began hosting his second solo web variety show titled Terrificent Terry. In the words of the producer of the show, it features Taehyun as a "classic case of a T-type struggling to accept fictions riddled with logical inconsistencies" in real world situations. The show features him meeting various other "T" people to learn understand how they use their skills in their day-to-day job.

== Artistry ==
In 2020, Taehyun made his songwriting and composing debut on Tomorrow X Together's song "Maze in the Mirror" from their second EP. In 2021, he stated songwriting is "a fun challenge" and noted the importance of good top-lining. In an interview with Elle, Taehyun stated writing lyrics helps give authenticity and persuasiveness to the music he performs. Taehyun has noted Justin Bieber and The Kid Laroi as inspirations for his songwriting, saying he looks at "pop artists and pop stars who are pushing the genre forward".

== Other ventures ==
=== Philanthropy ===
On his birthday in 2024, Taehyun donated ₩25 million (US$18,000) to the Fruit of Love Community Chest of Korea to support culturally underprivileged youth. He repeated the donation in 2025.

=== Kendama record ===
In December 2024, Taehyun became a Guinness World Record holder for being part of the world's longest line of people consecutively catching a kendama ball. The event took place during the 75th Kōhaku Uta Gassen in Tokyo, Japan, where he was the first catcher in a lineup of 128 participants.

== Discography ==
=== Singles ===
==== As featured artist ====
Title	Year	Album
"Perfect Storm" (Tomohisa Yamashita featuring Taehyun)	2024	Non-album singles
"Butterflies" (Jvke featuring Taehyun and Kim Chaewon)	2025	Non-album singles
"Breaking Through" (El Capitxn featuring Taehyun and Jeremy Zucker)	2026	Non-album singles

=== Soundtrack appearances ===
List of soundtrack appearances, showing year released, selected chart positions, and name of the album
Title	Year	Peak chart positions	Album
Title	Year	KOR DL	Album
"Can't Stop" (with HueningKai)	2024	51	Brewing Love Original Soundtrack
"Surfing in the Moonlight" (with HueningKai)	2025	—	Melo Movie Original Soundtrack
"I Love You I Love You too" (with Soobin)	2026	—	Sold Out On You Soundtrack
"I Miss You"	2026	—	Audible Original Stairway to Heaven
"—" denotes releases that did not chart or were not released in that region.

=== Other charted songs ===
Title	Year	Peak chart positions	Album
Title	Year	KOR DL	Album
"Bird of Night" (Note: credited to Tomorrow X Together, but the track is a solo by Taehyun)	2025	12	The Star Chapter: Together

=== Songwriting credits ===
All song credits are adapted from the Korea Music Copyright Association's database.

List of songs, showing year released, artist name, and name of the album
Year	Title	Artist	Album	Composer	Lyricist
2020	"Maze in the Mirror"	Tomorrow X Together	The Dream Chapter: Eternity	Yes	Yes
2020	"Sweat"	Tomorrow X Together	Non-album single	Yes	Yes
2020	"Ghosting"	Tomorrow X Together	Minisode1: Blue Hour	Yes	Yes
2020	"Wishlist"	Tomorrow X Together	Minisode1: Blue Hour	Yes	Yes
2021	"What If I Had Been That Puma"	Tomorrow X Together	The Chaos Chapter: Freeze	Yes	Yes
2021	"No Rules"	Tomorrow X Together	The Chaos Chapter: Freeze	Yes	Yes
2021	"Dear Sputnik"	Tomorrow X Together	The Chaos Chapter: Freeze	Yes	Yes
2021	"MOA Diary (Dubaddu Wari Wari)"	Tomorrow X Together	The Chaos Chapter: Fight or Escape	Yes	Yes
2021	"Sweet Dreams"	Tomorrow X Together	Non-album single	Yes	Yes
2022	"Opening Sequence"	Tomorrow X Together	Minisode 2: Thursday's Child	Yes	Yes
2022	"Trust Fund Baby"	Tomorrow X Together	Minisode 2: Thursday's Child	Yes	Yes
2022	"Thursday's Child Has Far To Go"	Tomorrow X Together	Minisode 2: Thursday's Child	Yes	Yes
2023	"Happy Fools" (feat. Coi Leray)	Tomorrow X Together	The Name Chapter: Temptation	Yes	Yes
2023	"Tinnitus (Wanna Be a Rock)"	Tomorrow X Together	The Name Chapter: Temptation	Yes	Yes
2023	"Ring (君じゃない誰かの愛し方)"	Tomorrow X Together	Sweet	Yes	No
2023	"Growing Pain"	Tomorrow X Together	The Name Chapter: Freefall	Yes	Yes
2023	"Happily Ever After"	Tomorrow X Together	The Name Chapter: Freefall	Yes	Yes
2023	"Blue Spring"	Tomorrow X Together	The Name Chapter: Freefall	Yes	Yes
2024	"I'll See You There Tomorrow"	Tomorrow X Together	Minisode 3: Tomorrow	Yes	Yes
2024	"Miracle"	Tomorrow X Together	Minisode 3: Tomorrow	Yes	Yes
2024	"The Killa (I Belong to You)"	Tomorrow X Together	Minisode 3: Tomorrow	Yes	Yes
2024	"Quarter Life	Tomorrow X Together	Minisode 3: Tomorrow	Yes	Yes
2024	"Open Always Wins"	Tomorrow X Together	Non-album single	Yes	Yes
2024	"Danger"	Tomorrow X Together	The Star Chapter: Sanctuary	Yes	Yes
2024	"Heaven"	Tomorrow X Together	The Star Chapter: Sanctuary	Yes	Yes
2024	"Resist (Not Gonna Run Away)"	Tomorrow X Together	The Star Chapter: Sanctuary	Yes	Yes
2024	"Higher than Heaven"	Tomorrow X Together	The Star Chapter: Sanctuary	Yes	Yes
2025	"Bird of Night"	Tomorrow X Together	The Star Chapter: Together	Yes	Yes
2026	"So What"	Tomorrow X Together	7th Year: A Moment of Stillness in the Thorns	Yes	Yes

== Filmography ==
=== Radio shows ===
Year	Title	Role	Notes	Ref.
2021	Listen (EBS FM)	DJ	With HueningKai	

=== Online shows ===
Year	Title	Role	Notes	Ref.
2023–2024	Academy Reincarnation	Host	Solo variety show	
2025	Tefficient Terry	Host	Solo variety show	
