= Yeonjun =

South Korean singer (born 1999)

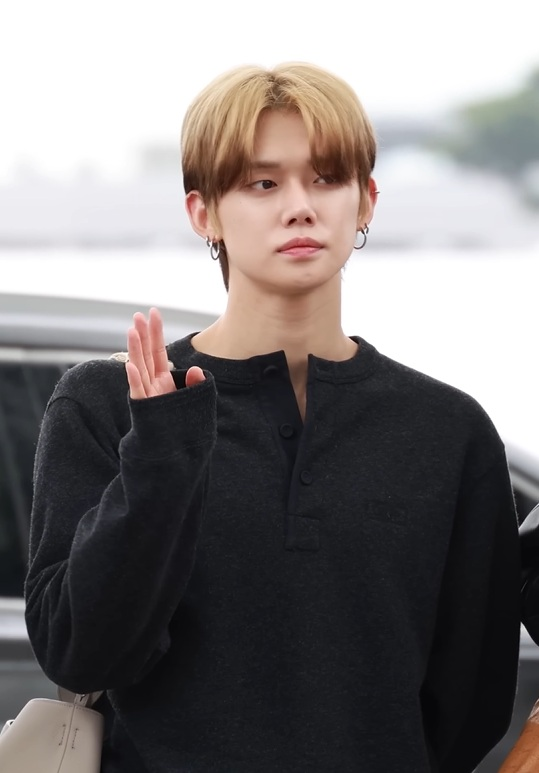
- Yeonjun - NO Labels, Part 02
- Born: Choi Yeon-jun; September 13, 1999 (age 27); Seongnam, South Korea
- Education: Global Cyber University
- Occupations: Singer; songwriter; dancer
- Years active: 2019–present
- Musical career
- Genre: K-pop
- Instrument: Vocals
- Label: BigHit
- Member of: Tomorrow X Together

Korean name
- Hangul: 최연준
- RR: Choe Yeonjun
- MR: Ch'oe Yŏnjun

Signature
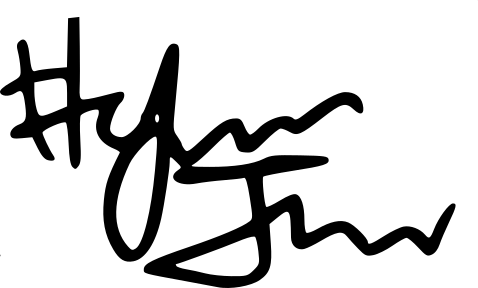

Choi Yeon-jun (Korean: 최연준; born September 13, 1999), known mononymously as Yeonjun, is a South Korean singer and songwriter. He is a member of the South Korean boy band Tomorrow X Together, formed by Big Hit Entertainment in 2019. He debuted as a soloist in September 2024 with the song "Ggum" and released his first extended play No Labels: Part 01 on November 7, 2025 and Part 02, also an EP, on July 10, 2026.

== Early life and education ==
Choi Yeon-jun was born on September 13, 1999, in Bundang District, Seongnam, South Korea, as an only child. He lived in the United States for two years to learn English before returning to South Korea. After graduating from Korean Arts High School, he enrolled in Global Cyber University.

== Career ==
=== Pre-debut ===
Prior to his debut, he trained under Big Hit Entertainment for four years. Throughout his four years of training, Yeonjun became known as the company's "legendary trainee" because he consistently ranked first during monthly evaluations in dance, vocal performance and rap. He is also a former trainee of Cube Entertainment. Yeonjun also appeared as a back up dancer at 2014 Melon Music Awards for a few performances.

=== 2019–2024: Debut with Tomorrow X Together and solo activities ===
On January 10, 2019, BigHit announced the upcoming debut of its new boy group Tomorrow X Together. Yeonjun was the first member of the lineup to be revealed, through an introductory video posted on the label's official YouTube channel and social media. On March 4, 2019, he debuted as a member of Tomorrow X Together with the release of their first extended play (EP), The Dream Chapter: Star.

Yeonjun made his acting debut on January 12, 2021, with a cameo appearance in the JTBC drama series Live On as Kim Jin-woo. The following month, he participated in 2021 Fall/Winter New York Fashion Week, walking as a model for the South Korean brand UL:KIN. He featured on the track "Blockbuster" from Enhypen's first studio album Dimension: Dilemma, which was released on October 12.

In February 2022, Yeonjun featured on the single "PS5" by American singer-songwriter Salem Ilese, alongside bandmate Taehyun and Norwegian DJ Alan Walker. He was announced as a host for Inkigayo, alongside actors Roh Jeong-eui and Seo Bum-june, on March 15. In July, Yeonjun became an ambassador for the streetwear brand Privé Alliance. He also served as a guest creative designer and released a limited capsule collection available the following month until December. In November 2023, he was announced as a co-host for the year-end festival SBS Gayo Daejeon alongside Key and An Yu-jin; the event was held on December 25. On June 25, 2024, it was announced that Yeonjun would be hosting the SBS Gayo Daejeon's Summer Edition alongside Ive's An Yu-jin and NCT's Doyoung.

In November 2024, it was announced that Yeonjun would be hosting the SBS Gayo Daejeon for the third consecutive time.

=== 2024–present: Solo debut with "Ggum", No Labels: Part 01 and Part 02 ===
Studio MaumC announced Yeonjun as part of the artist lineup for the OST of the Coupang Play original series Cinderella at 2 AM on August 16, 2024. He contributed the song "Boyfriend", which was released on September 1. On September 6, BigHit announced Yeonjun's upcoming debut as a solo artist. A video titled "Yeonjun's Mixtape Intro Film" was uploaded to the Hybe Labels official YouTube channel two days later, with his September 19 debut date revealed at the end. His debut was later revealed to be titled "Ggum", described as a "hip-hop track with a catchy electro sound". With the song, he won his first music show trophy, on Mnet's October 4 broadcast of M Countdown. In November 2024, Yeonjun was named one of GQ Korea's Men of the Year. Yeonjun released his first solo EP, No Labels: Part 01, on November 7, 2025. He released his second EP, No Labels: Part 02 on July 10, 2026.

== Other ventures ==
=== Public image and endorsements ===
Yeonjun has been nicknamed "K-pop's 4th Generation It boy" by multiple sources, and has appeared on the Korean Business Research Institute's male celebrity brand reputation list, a chart that records Korean celebrities with the most online searches and engagements. He ranked within the top 20 in November 2020, and the top 30 in both February and March 2023.

Yeonjun has appeared in various fashion magazines including Dazed Korea, GQ Korea, W Korea, Elle Korea and Paper Magazine. He featured on the cover of the September 2022 special edition of the Japanese fashion magazine SPUR. On May 31, 2024, Yeonjun was announced as the global brand ambassador of the Italian luxury fashion house Moncler.

On March 10, 2026, Yeonjun walked the runway for Miu Miu at Paris Fashion Week. In April 2026, Yeonjun was officially announced as a Friend of the House for Miu Miu.

=== Philanthropy ===
In May 2024, Yeonjun donated 50 million won to Hallym Burn Foundation, an organization dedicated to assisting firefighters in their crucial line of duty.

On his birthday, September 13, 2026, Yeonjun donated 100 million won to the Community Chest of Korea, an organization that provides free meal programs for the low-income elderly residents of Seongnam, and to renovation work on aging welfare facilities there. This puts him in the Honor Society, a group of people who have donated at least 100 million won within 5 years.

== Discography ==
=== Extended plays ===
Title	Details	Peak chart positions								Sales
Title	Details	KOR	AUS	BEL (FL)	GER	JPN	JPN Hot	US	US World	Sales
No Labels: Part 01	Released: November 7, 2025; Label: BigHit Music; Formats: CD, digital download, streaming	1	—	113	71	3	6	10	2	KOR: 741,858; JPN: 44,692; US: 29,000
No Labels: Part 02	Released: July 10, 2026; Label: BigHit Music; Format: CD, digital download, streaming	1	72	53	—	2	4	16	1	KOR: 808,978; JPN: 43,816

=== Singles ===
==== As lead artist ====
Title	Year	Peak chart positions							Sales	Album
Title	Year	KOR	JPN	JPN Hot	NZ Hot	TWN	US World	WW Excl. US	Sales	Album
"Ggum"	2024	82	10	81	38	—	4	—	KOR: 139,500; JPN: 13,444	Ggum
"Talk to You"	2025	73	—	18	—	—	—	—		No Labels: Part 01
"Ice Cream"	2026	14	—	30	34	20	—	89		No Labels: Part 02
"—" denotes releases that did not chart or were not released in that region.

==== As featured artist ====
Title	Year	Peak chart positions	Album
Title	Year	KOR DL	Album
"Touch" (remix) (Katseye featuring Yeonjun)	2024	128	Non-album single

=== Soundtrack appearances ===
Title	Year	Peak chart positions	Sales	Album
Title	Year	KOR DL	Sales	Album
"Boyfriend"	2024	51	JPN: 2,015 (dig.)	Cinderella at 2 AM OST
"Make It Count" (with Becky G, Mike Towers)	2026	—		2026 World Baseball Classic
"Rockstarr"	2026	—		Street World Fighter : Directors' War (SDF)
"Home"	2026	—		The Seasons : Sung Si-kyung's Ear Candy

=== Other charted songs ===
Title	Year	Peak chart positions		Album
Title	Year	KOR	NZ Hot	Album
"Blockbuster" (Enhypen featuring Yeonjun)	2021	— (Note: "Blockbuster" did not enter the Circle Digital Chart, but peaked at number 131 on the Circle Download Chart.)	—	Dimension: Dilemma
"Ghost Girl" (Note: Credited to Tomorrow X Together, but the track is a solo by Yeonjun)	2025	76	—	The Star Chapter: Together
"Forever"	2025	— (Note: "Forever" did not enter the Circle Digital Chart, but peaked at number 43 on the Circle Download Chart.)	—	No Labels: Part 01
"Let Me Tell You" (featuring Daniela of Katseye)	2025	— (Note: "Let Me Tell You" did not enter the Circle Digital Chart, but peaked at number 40 on the Circle Download Chart.)	29	No Labels: Part 01
"Do It"	2025	— (Note: "Do It" did not enter the Circle Digital Chart, but peaked at number 47 on the Circle Download Chart.)	—	No Labels: Part 01
"Nothin' 'Bout Me"	2025	— (Note: "Nothin' 'Bout Me" did not enter the Circle Digital Chart, but peaked at number 49 on the Circle Download Chart.)	—	No Labels: Part 01
"Coma"	2025	— (Note: "Coma" did not enter the Circle Digital Chart, but peaked at number 45 on the Circle Download Chart.)	—	No Labels: Part 01
"—" denotes releases that did not chart or were not released in that region.

=== Songwriting credits ===
All song credits are adapted from the Korea Music Copyright Association's database unless stated otherwise.

List of songs, showing year released, artist name, and name of the album
Year	Title	Artist	Album	Composer	Lyricist
2020	"Fairy of Shampoo"	Tomorrow X Together	The Dream Chapter: Eternity	Yes	Yes
2020	"Maze in the Mirror"	Tomorrow X Together	The Dream Chapter: Eternity	Yes	Yes
2020	"Wishlist"	Tomorrow X Together	Minisode1: Blue Hour	Yes	Yes
2020	"Way Home"	Tomorrow X Together	Minisode1: Blue Hour	Yes	Yes
2021	"What If I Had Been That Puma"	Tomorrow X Together	The Chaos Chapter: Freeze	Yes	Yes
2021	"No Rules"	Tomorrow X Together	The Chaos Chapter: Freeze	Yes	Yes
2021	"Frost"	Tomorrow X Together	The Chaos Chapter: Freeze	Yes	Yes
2021	"Loser=Lover"	Tomorrow X Together	The Chaos Chapter: Fight or Escape	Yes	Yes
2021	"MOA Diary"	Tomorrow X Together	The Chaos Chapter: Fight or Escape	Yes	Yes
2021	"Blockbuster"	Enhypen	Dimension: Dilemma	Yes	Yes
2021	"Sweet Dreams"	Tomorrow X Together	Non-album single	Yes	Yes
2022	"Good Boy Gone Bad"	Tomorrow X Together	Minisode 2: Thursday's Child	Yes	Yes
2022	"Trust Fund Baby"	Tomorrow X Together	Minisode 2: Thursday's Child	Yes	Yes
2022	"Lonely Boy"	Tomorrow X Together	Minisode 2: Thursday's Child	Yes	Yes
2022	"Valley of Lies" (feat. Iann Dior)	Tomorrow X Together	Non-album singles	Yes	Yes
2022	"Ring" (君じゃない誰かの愛し方)	Tomorrow X Together	Non-album singles	Yes	No
2023	"Happy Fools" (feat. Coi Leray)	Tomorrow X Together	The Name Chapter: Temptation	Yes	Yes
2023	"Tinnitus (Wanna Be a Rock)"	Tomorrow X Together	The Name Chapter: Temptation	Yes	Yes
2023	"Farewell, Neverland"	Tomorrow X Together	The Name Chapter: Temptation	Yes	Yes
2023	"Blue Spring"	Tomorrow X Together	The Name Chapter: Freefall	Yes	Yes
2023	"Growing Pain"	Tomorrow X Together	The Name Chapter: Freefall	Yes	Yes
2023	"Dreamer"	Tomorrow X Together	The Name Chapter: Freefall	Yes	Yes
2023	"Deep Down"	Tomorrow X Together	The Name Chapter: Freefall	Yes	Yes
2023	"Happily Ever After"	Tomorrow X Together	The Name Chapter: Freefall	Yes	Yes
2024	"I'll See You There Tomorrow"	Tomorrow X Together	Minisode 3: Tomorrow	Yes	Yes
2024	"Miracle"	Tomorrow X Together	Minisode 3: Tomorrow	Yes	Yes
2024	"The Killa (I Belong to You)"	Tomorrow X Together	Minisode 3: Tomorrow	Yes	Yes
2024	"Open Always Wins"	Tomorrow X Together	Non-album singles	Yes	Yes
2024	"Ggum"	Yeonjun	Non-album singles	Yes	Yes
2024	"Touch" (remix) (featuring Yeonjun)	Katseye	Non-album singles	Yes	Yes
2024	"Heaven"	Tomorrow X Together	The Star Chapter: Sanctuary	Yes	Yes
2024	"Danger"	Tomorrow X Together	The Star Chapter: Sanctuary	Yes	Yes
2025	"Upside Down Kiss"	Tomorrow X Together	The Star Chapter: Together	Yes	Yes
2025	"Ghost Girl"	Tomorrow X Together	The Star Chapter: Together	Yes	Yes
2025	"Talk to You"	Yeonjun	No Labels: Part 01	Yes	Yes
2025	"Let Me Tell You" (featuring Daniela of Katseye)	Yeonjun	No Labels: Part 01	Yes	Yes
2025	"Do It"	Yeonjun	No Labels: Part 01	Yes	Yes
2025	"Nothin' 'Bout Me"	Yeonjun	No Labels: Part 01	Yes	Yes
2025	"Coma"	Yeonjun	No Labels: Part 01	Yes	Yes
2026	"So What"	Tomorrow X Together	7th Year: A Moment of Stillness in the Thorns	Yes	Yes
2026	"Make It Count" (with Becky G, Mike Towers)	Yeonjun	2026 World Baseball Classic	Yes	Yes
2026	"조금 서툴러도 다시 (Baby Wassup?)"	Yeonjun	No Labels: Part 02	Yes	Yes
2026	"Long Way Long Ride"	Yeonjun	No Labels: Part 02	Yes	Yes

== Filmography ==
=== Television series ===
Television series appearances
Year	Title	Role	Notes	Ref.
2021	Live On	Kim Jin-woo	Cameo (Ep. 8)	
2025	Resident Playbook	Top Key	Cameo (Ep. 9)	

=== Hosting ===
Hosting appearances
Year	Title	Role	Notes	Ref.
2019	Inkigayo	Special MC	with Mingyu, Shin Eun-soo	
2019	Inkigayo	Special MC	with Lee Na-eun, Soobin	
2019	M Countdown	Special MC	with Ravi, Soobin	
2022–2024	Inkigayo	Host	with Roh Jeong-eui, Seo Bum-june and Park Ji-hu, Woonhak	
2023	SBS Gayo Daejeon	Host	with Key and Yujin	
2024	SBS Gayo Daejeon: Summer Edition	Host	with Doyoung and Yujin	
2024	SBS Gayo Daejeon	Host	with Doyoung and Yujin	
2025	SBS Gayo Daejeon: Summer	Host	with Doyoung and Yujin	

== Awards and nominations ==
Name of the award ceremony, year presented, award category, nominee(s) of the award, and the result of the nomination
Award ceremony	Year	Category	Nominee(s)/work(s)	Result	Ref.
Asian Pop Music Awards (Note: Hosted by the Hong Kong Asia Pacific International Group and Sunway Records, the Asian Pop Music Awards bases its winners on the "Asian Pop Music Chart" which opened in September 2019.)	2024	Best Dance Performance (Overseas)	"Ggum"	Nominated	
Blue Dragon Series Awards	2025	OST Popularity Award	"Boyfriend"	Won	
Hanteo Music Awards	2025	Global Artist Award – Oceania	Yeonjun	Won	
Hanteo Music Awards	2025	Global Artist – Africa	Yeonjun	Nominated	
Hanteo Music Awards	2025	Global Artist – Asia	Yeonjun	Nominated	
Hanteo Music Awards	2025	Global Artist – Europe	Yeonjun	Nominated	
Hanteo Music Awards	2025	Global Artist – North America	Yeonjun	Nominated	
Hanteo Music Awards	2025	Global Artist – South America	Yeonjun	Nominated	
iHeartRadio Music Awards	2025	Favorite K-pop Dance Challenge	"Ggum"	Won	
KM Chart Awards	2026	Best Popular Solo Male Artist	Yeonjun	Won	
Korea First Brand Awards	2025	Best Male Solo Singer	Yeonjun	Nominated	
MAMA Awards	2026	Best Male Artist	Yeonjun	Won	
