= Ggum =

Single by Yeonjun
- Language: Korean; English
- Released: September 19, 2024
- Genre: Hip-hop; electro
- Length: 2:31
- Label: BigHit
- Songwriters: Benji Bae; Jesse Thomas; Jurek Reunamäki; Ryan Curtis; Teemu Brunila; Timms; Yeonjun
- Producers: Teemu Brunila; Jurek

Yeonjun singles chronology
"PS5" (2022)	"Ggum" (2024)	"Touch" (remix) (2024)

Music video
- "Ggum" on YouTube

"Ggum" is the debut solo single by South Korean singer Yeonjun of Tomorrow X Together. It was released digitally by BigHit Music on September 19, 2024, followed by a physical release on October 29, 2024.

== Background and release ==
On September 6, 2024, it was reported that Yeonjun would be making his solo debut that same month. Three days later, BigHit announced Yeonjun's debut single "Ggum". Concept photos for the single were released on September 11 and 12. On September 13, Yeonjun released a video through the band's social media pages, teasing the song's choreography. A teaser for the single's music video was released a day prior to its release on September 18.

"Ggum" was released digitally on September 19, 2024. It was later released physically on October 29.

== Critical reception ==
Professional ratings
Review scores
Source	Rating
NME	3/5 stars

Carmen Chin from NME rated the song three out of five stars, describing it as having a catchy hook but with "little to write home about beyond that", and criticised the song's heavy use of voice modulation which "ends up drowning out Yeonjun's own uniqueness".

== Accolades ==
On South Korean music programs, "Ggum" achieved a first place win on the October 3 episode of M Countdown. The song also won the iHeartRadio Music Award for Favorite K-Pop Dance Challenge.

== Commercial performance ==
On the day of its physical release, "Ggum" topped the Circle Daily Retail Album Chart in South Korea, and the Oricon Daily Singles Chart in Japan, having sold 8,368 copies.

== Credits and personnel ==
- Yeonjun – vocals, songwriter
- Teemu Brunila – songwriter, producer
- Jurek – songwriter, producer
- Timms – songwriter
- Benji Bae – songwriter
- Ryan Curtis – songwriter
- Jesse Thomas – songwriter

== Charts ==
=== Weekly charts ===
Weekly chart performance for "Ggum"
Chart (2024)	Peak position
Japan (Japan Hot 100)	81
Japan (Oricon)	10
Japan Combined Singles (Oricon)	36
New Zealand Hot Singles (RMNZ)	38
South Korea (Circle)	82
South Korean Albums (Circle)	7
US World Digital Song Sales (Billboard)	4

=== Monthly charts ===
Monthly chart performance for "Ggum"
Chart (2024)	Peak position
Japan (Oricon)	36
South Korea Download (Circle)	15
South Korean Albums (Circle)	10

== Release history ==
Release history for "Ggum"
Region	Date	Format	Label
Various	September 19, 2024	Digital download; streaming	BigHit
Japan	October 28, 2024	CD single	Hybe Japan
South Korea	October 29, 2024	CD single	BigHit
