= Apink discography =

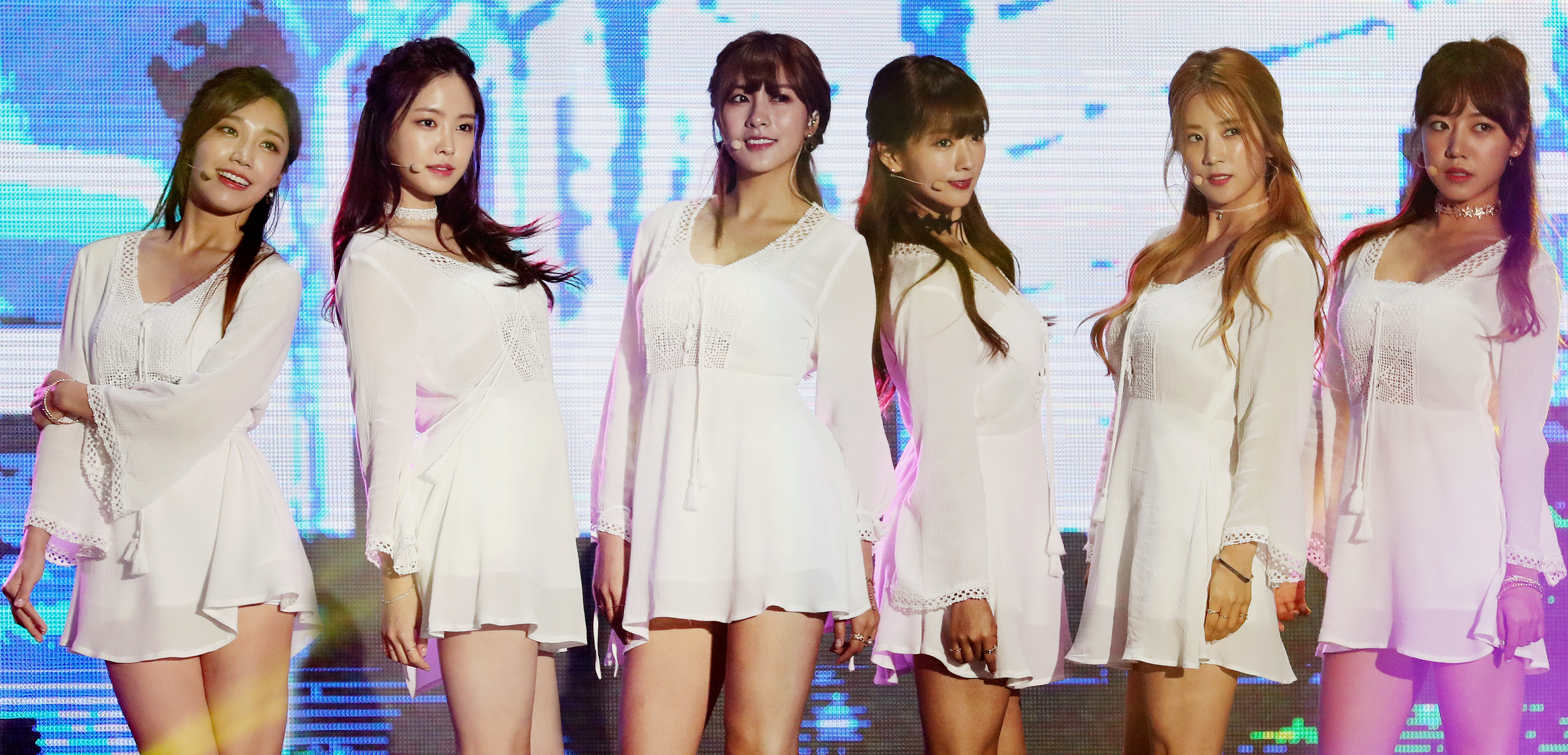
- Apink at Korea Sale Festa Opening Ceremony on September 30, 2016
- Studio albums: 7
- Extended plays: 9
- Soundtrack albums: 1
- Compilation albums: 3
- Singles: 38
- Video albums: 8
- Music videos: 42
- Single albums: 1

South Korean girl group Apink have released seven studio albums, nine extended plays, three compilation albums, one single album, and thirty-eight singles. Formed by A Cube Entertainment, they debuted on April 19, 2011, with the extended play Seven Springs of Apink.

== Albums ==
=== Studio albums ===
List of studio albums, with selected details, chart positions and sales
| Title | Details | Peak chart positions | | | Sales |
| Title | Details | KOR | JPN | US World | Sales |
|---|---|---|---|---|---|
| Une Année | Released: May 9, 2012 (KOR); Label: A Cube Entertainment; Formats: CD, digital download | 4 | — | — | KOR: 41,421 |
| Pink Memory | Released: July 21, 2015 (KOR); Label: A Cube Entertainment; Formats: CD, digital download | 2 | 36 | — | KOR: 90,080; JPN: 5,330 |
| Pink Season | Released: August 26, 2015 (JPN); Label: Universal Music Japan; Formats: CD, digital download | — | 5 | — | JPN: 14,768 |
| Pink Revolution | Released: September 26, 2016 (KOR); Label: Plan A Entertainment; Formats: CD, digital download | 2 | 39 | 12 | KOR: 50,375; JPN: 2,920 |
| Pink Doll | Released: December 21, 2016 (JPN); Label: Universal Music Japan; Formats: CD, digital download | — | 10 | — | JPN: 12,248 |
| Pink Stories | Released: December 27, 2017 (JPN); Label: Universal Music Japan; Formats: CD, digital download; Tracklist: 1. "Hello Hello"; 2. "Bye Bye"; 3. "Rainbow"; 4. "Darling"; 5. "PapipupePON!" (ぱぴぷぺPON!); 6. "Motto GO!GO!"; 7. "Love Shoot!"; 8. "Dahlia" (ダリア); 9. "I'm in Love"; 10. "Love Forever"; 11. "Orion"; 12. "Happy Ending" | — | 20 | — | JPN: 3,898 |
| Horn | Released: February 14, 2022 (KOR); Label: IST Entertainment; Formats: CD, digital download | 4 | — | — | KOR: 69,670 |
"—" denotes releases that did not chart or were not released in that region.

=== Compilation albums ===
List of compilation albums, with selected details, chart positions, sales, and certifications
| Title | Details | Peak chart positions | | Sales |
| Title | Details | KOR | JPN | Sales |
|---|---|---|---|---|
| 2011-2014 Best of Apink - Korean Ver. | Released: December 17, 2014 (JPN); Label: EMI Music Japan; Formats: CD, digital download | — | 56 | JPN: 3,229 |
| Dear | Released: December 15, 2016 (KOR); Label: Plan A Entertainment; Formats: CD, digital download | 2 | 61 | KOR: 31,557; JPN: 1,723 |
| Apink Single Collection | Released: April 30, 2018 (JPN); Label: Universal Music Japan; Formats: CD, digital download | — | 46 | JPN: 1,080 |

=== Single albums ===
| Title | Details | Peak positions | Sales |
| Title | Details | KOR | Sales |
|---|---|---|---|
| Miracle | Released: April 19, 2018; Label: Plan A Entertainment; Formats: CD, digital download | 6 | KOR: 18,210 |

== Extended plays ==
List of extended plays, with selected details, chart positions and sales
| Title | Details | Peak chart positions | | | Sales |
| Title | Details | KOR | JPN | US World | Sales |
|---|---|---|---|---|---|
| Seven Springs of Apink | Released: April 19, 2011; Label: A Cube Entertainment; Formats: CD, digital download | 6 | — | — | KOR: 25,745 |
| Snow Pink | Released: November 22, 2011; Label: A Cube Entertainment; Formats: CD, digital download | 7 | — | — | KOR: 27,470 |
| Secret Garden | Released: July 5, 2013; Label: A Cube Entertainment; Formats: CD, digital download | 2 | 81 | — | KOR: 71,697; JPN: 3,480 |
| Pink Blossom | Released: March 31, 2014; Label: A Cube Entertainment; Formats: CD, digital download | 2 | 59 | — | KOR: 76,307; JPN: 6,139 |
| Pink Luv | Released: November 24, 2014; Label: A Cube Entertainment; Formats: CD, digital download | 1 | 53 | — | KOR: 80,698; JPN: 5,574 |
| Pink Up | Released: June 26, 2017; Label: Plan A Entertainment; Formats: CD, digital download | 1 | 49 | 14 | KOR: 53,675; JPN: 2,189 |
| One & Six | Released: July 2, 2018; Label: Plan A Entertainment; Formats: CD, digital download | 1 | 32 | 11 | KOR: 64,030; JPN: 3,681 |
| Percent | Released: January 7, 2019; Label: Plan A Entertainment; Formats: CD, digital download | 3 | — | 14 | KOR: 49,553 |
| Look | Released: April 13, 2020; Label: Play M Entertainment; Formats: CD, digital download | 2 | 49 | — | KOR: 47,937; JPN: 1,340 |
| Self | Released: April 5, 2023; Label: IST Entertainment; Formats: CD, digital download | 5 | — | — | KOR: 65,637 |
| Re: Love | Released: January 5, 2026; Label: With US Entertainment; Formats: CD, digital download | 3 | — | — | KOR: 43,856 |
"—" denotes releases that did not chart or were not released in that region.

== Singles ==
List of singles, with selected chart positions, showing year released and album name
| Title | Year | Peak chart positions | | | | | Sales (Note: Korean single section is a digital sales only by Gaon Music Chart and Japanese single section is a CD single sales by Oricon) | Album |
| Title | Year | KOR | KOR Hot | JPN | JPN Hot | US World | Sales | Album |
Korean
| "I Don't Know" (몰라요) | 2011 | 20 | — | — | — | — | KOR: 999,637 | Seven Springs of Apink |
| "It Girl" (Remix Version) | 2011 | 47 | — | — | — | — | KOR: 281,782 | Non-album single |
| "My My" | 2011 | 16 | 16 | — | — | — | KOR: 1,906,585 | Snow Pink |
| "April 19th" | 2012 | 44 | 35 | — | — | — | KOR: 134,855 | Une Année |
| "Hush" | 2012 | 11 | 13 | — | — | — | KOR: 1,280,030 | Une Année |
| "Bubibu" (Remix Version) | 2012 | 20 | 18 | — | — | — | KOR: 501,234 | Non-album single |
| "NoNoNo" | 2013 | 3 | 2 | — | — | — | KOR: 1,786,623 | Secret Garden |
| "Good Morning Baby" | 2014 | 6 | 11 | — | — | — | KOR: 457,087 | Pink Luv |
| "Mr. Chu" (On Stage) | 2014 | 2 | 2 | — | — | 20 | KOR: 1,580,825 | Pink Blossom |
| "My Darling" (Apink BnN) | 2014 | 28 | 17 | — | — | — | KOR: 100,271 | Pink Luv |
| "Luv" | 2014 | 2 | —N/a | — | — | 5 | KOR: 1,490,824 | Pink Luv |
| "Promise U" (새끼손가락) | 2015 | 16 | —N/a | — | — | — | KOR: 72,460 | Pink Memory |
| "Remember" | 2015 | 2 | —N/a | — | — | 14 | KOR: 1,111,701 | Pink Memory |
| "The Wave" (네가 손짓해주면) | 2016 | 16 | —N/a | — | — | — | KOR: 154,085 | Pink Revolution |
| "Only One" (내가 설렐 수 있게) | 2016 | 5 | —N/a | — | — | — | KOR: 449,622 | Pink Revolution |
| "Cause You're My Star" (별의 별) | 2016 | 25 | —N/a | — | — | — | KOR: 121,193 | Dear |
| "Always" | 2017 | 32 | —N/a | — | — | — | KOR: 50,855 | Pink Up |
| "Five" | 2017 | 4 | —N/a | — | — | — | KOR: 826,105 | Pink Up |
| "Miracle" (기적 같은 이야기) | 2018 | — (Note: "Miracle" did not enter the Gaon Digital Chart, but appeared at number 37 on the component Download chart and number 6 on the Album chart.) | — | — | — | — | —N/a | Miracle |
| "I'm So Sick" (1도 없어) | 2018 | 3 | 3 | — | — | 8 | —N/a | One & Six |
| "%% (Eung Eung)" (응응) | 2019 | 17 | 14 | — | — | 8 | —N/a | Percent |
| "Dumhdurum" (덤더럼) | 2020 | 2 | 2 | — | — | 10 | —N/a | Look |
| "Thank You" (고마워) | 2021 | 131 | — | — | — | — | —N/a | Horn |
| "Dilemma" | 2022 | 55 | 60 | — | — | 14 | —N/a | Horn |
| "I Want You to Be Happy" (나만 알면 돼) | 2022 | — (Note: "I Want You to Be Happy" did not enter the Gaon Digital Chart, but appeared at number 14 on the component Download chart.) | — | — | — | — | —N/a | Self |
| "D N D" | 2023 | 111 | — | — | — | — | —N/a | Self |
| "Pink Christmas" | 2023 | — (Note: "Pink Christmas" did not enter the Circle Digital Chart, but appeared at number 18 on the component Download chart.) | — | — | — | — | —N/a | Non-album singles |
| "Wait Me There" (기억, 그 아름다움) | 2024 | — (Note: "Wait Me There" did not enter the Circle Digital Chart, but appeared at number 44 on the component Download chart.) | — | — | — | — | —N/a | Non-album singles |
| "Tap Clap" | 2025 | — (Note: "Tap Clap" did not enter the Circle Digital Chart, but appeared at number 39 on the component Download chart.) | — | — | — | — | —N/a | Non-album singles |
| "Love Me More" | 2026 | 99 | — | — | — | — | —N/a | Re: Love |
| "15th Season" | 2026 | — (Note: "15th Season" did not enter the Circle Digital Chart, but appeared at number 42 on the component Download chart.) | — | — | — | — | —N/a | Non-album single |
Japanese
| "NoNoNo" | 2014 | — | — | 4 | 6 | — | JPN: 39,561 | Pink Season |
| "Mr. Chu" | 2015 | — | — | 2 | 5 | — | JPN: 59,460 | Pink Season |
| "Luv" | 2015 | — | — | 2 | 4 | — | JPN: 47,100 | Pink Season |
| "Sunday Monday" | 2015 | — | — | 6 | 19 | — | JPN: 19,204 | Pink Doll |
| "Brand New Days" | 2016 | — | — | 11 | 26 | — | JPN: 11,055 | Pink Doll |
| "Summer Time" | 2016 | — | — | 2 | 5 | — | JPN: 41,127 | Pink Doll |
| "Bye Bye" | 2017 | — | — | 5 | 16 | — | JPN: 23,770 | Pink Stories |
| "More Go! Go!" | 2017 | — | — | 9 | 27 | — | JPN: 13,999 | Pink Stories |
| "Orion" | 2017 | — | — | 7 | 15 | — | JPN: 23,241 | Pink Stories |
"—" denotes releases that did not chart or were not released in that region.

== Other charted songs ==
| Title | Year | Peak chart positions | Sales (Note: Korean single section is a digital sales only by Gaon Music Chart and Japanese single section is a CD single sales by Oricon) | Album |
| Title | Year | KOR | Sales | Album |
|---|---|---|---|---|
| "Cat" (고양이) | 2012 | 175 | —N/a | Une Année |
| "Bubibu" | 2012 | 120 | —N/a | Une Année |
| "Step" | 2012 | 170 | —N/a | Une Année |
| "Boy" | 2012 | 189 | —N/a | Une Année |
| "I Got You" | 2012 | 187 | —N/a | Une Année |
| "Up to the Sky" (하늘 높이) (featuring Yong Jun-hyung) | 2012 | 156 | —N/a | Une Année |
| "U You" | 2013 | 42 | KOR: 120,018 | Secret Garden |
| "Lovely Day" | 2013 | 67 | KOR: 55,619 | Secret Garden |
| "I Need You" (난 니가 필요해) | 2013 | 127 | KOR: 21,216 | Secret Garden |
| "Secret Garden" | 2013 | 136 | KOR: 21,349 | Secret Garden |
| "Sunday Monday" | 2014 | 27 | KOR: 59,490 | Pink Blossom |
| "Fairytale Love" (사랑동화) | 2014 | 34 | KOR: 45,262 | Pink Blossom |
| "So Long" | 2014 | 37 | KOR: 38,354 | Pink Blossom |
| "Crystal" | 2014 | 38 | KOR: 37,845 | Pink Blossom |
| "Mr. Chu" | 2014 | 57 | KOR: 27,380 | Pink Blossom |
| "Secret" | 2014 | 14 | KOR: 146,444 | Pink Luv |
| "Wanna Be" | 2014 | 37 | KOR: 46,760 | Pink Luv |
| "Not an Angel" (천사가 아냐) | 2014 | 39 | KOR: 45,527 | Pink Luv |
| "Love Like a Fairytale" (동화 같은 사랑) | 2014 | 45 | KOR: 42,166 | Pink Luv |
| "Attracted to U" (끌려) | 2015 | 63 | KOR: 42,436 | Pink Memory |
| "Petal" (꽃잎점) | 2015 | 70 | KOR: 38,444 | Pink Memory |
| "Perfume" | 2015 | 92 | KOR: 28,540 | Pink Memory |
| "Dejavu" | 2015 | 95 | KOR: 28,566 | Pink Memory |
| "Boom Pow Love" | 2016 | 89 | KOR: 24,186 | Pink Revolution |
| "Eyes" | 2017 | 75 | KOR: 32,163 | Pink Up |
| "Kok Kok" | 2017 | 97 | KOR: 25,055 | Pink Up |
"—" denotes releases that did not chart or were not released in that region.

== Other appearances ==
| Year | Title | Other artist(s) | Album |
|---|---|---|---|
| 2011 | "Skinny Baby" | Beast | Non-album songs |
| 2013 | "A Year Ago" (일년전에) (Note: "A Year Ago" was Jeong Eun-ji, Kim Nam-joo participated in this release but it was credited to Apink and Beast.) | Jang Hyun-seung | Non-album songs |
| 2013 | "5! My Baby" | Beast | Non-album songs |
| 2013 | "Mini" (미니) | B.A.P | Non-album songs |
| 2016 | "Our Night Is More Beautiful Than Your Day" (Note: "A Year Ago" was Yoon Bo-mi and Kim Nam-joo participated in this release but it was credited to Apink and Beast.) | Various Artists | Non-album songs |

== Videography ==
=== Video albums ===
| Title | Album details | Peak chart positions | Sales |
| Title | Album details | JPN | Sales |
|---|---|---|---|
| APINK 1st Concert「PINK PARADISE」DVD | Released: June 24, 2015 (JPN); Labels: Copan Global; Format: DVD | 22 | JPN: 2,302 |
| Apink 1st Live Tour 2015 ～PINK SEASON～ | Released: February 10, 2016 (JPN); Labels: Universal Music Japan; Format: DVD, Blu-ray | 17 (DVD); 11 (Blu-ray) | JPN: 4,240 |
| APINK 2nd Concert Pink Island In Seoul | Released: March 9, 2016 (JPN); Labels: Universal Music Japan; Format: DVD | 23 | JPN: 1,112 |
| Apink 2nd Live Tour 2016 「PINK SUMMER」 | Released: October 16, 2016 (JPN); Labels: Universal Music Japan; Format: DVD, Blu-ray | 27 (DVD); 36 (Blu-ray) | JPN: 2,763 |
| Apink 3rd Concert: Pink Party | Released: September 4, 2017 (KOR); Labels: Genie Music; Format: DVD | — | —N/a |
| Apink 3rd Live Tour 2017 “3years” at Pacifico Yokohama | Released: January 24, 2018 (JPN); Labels: Universal Music Japan; Format: DVD, Blu-ray | 33 (DVD); 46 (Blu-ray) | —N/a |
| PINK SPACE 2018 | Released: June 20, 2018 (KOR); Labels: Genie Music; Format: DVD | — | —N/a |
| Apink 5th Concert 2019 PINK COLLECTION：RED & WHITE | Released: December 28, 2019 (KOR); Labels: Play M Entertainment; Format: DVD | — | —N/a |

=== Music videos (Korean) ===
| Year | Music video | Album | Director(s) | Notes |
|---|---|---|---|---|
| 2011 | "I Don't Know" (몰라요) | Seven Springs of Apink | Zanybros | Debut single (Cameo appearance by Lee Gi-kwang) |
| 2011 | "Wishlist" | Seven Springs of Apink | Zanybros | —N/a |
| 2011 | "It Girl" | Seven Springs of Apink | Zanybros | —N/a |
| 2011 | "My My" | Snow Pink | Zanybros | —N/a |
| 2012 | "Hush" | Une Année | Zanybros | —N/a |
| 2013 | "NoNoNo" | Secret Garden | Zanybros | —N/a |
| 2013 | "Secret Garden" | Secret Garden | Zanybros | —N/a |
| 2013 | "U You" | Secret Garden | Unknown | Single released to commemorate two years since debut |
| 2014 | "Good Morning Baby" | Pink Luv | Unknown | Anniversary 1000 days from debut |
| 2014 | "Mr. Chu" | Pink Blossom | Digipedi | —N/a |
| 2014 | "Crystal" | Pink Blossom | Unknown | —N/a |
| 2014 | "Luv" | Pink Luv | Zanybros | —N/a |
| 2015 | "Promise U" | Pink Memory | Unknown | Single released to commemorate four years since debut |
| 2015 | "Remember" | Pink Memory | Zanybros | —N/a |
| 2015 | "Petal" (꽃잎점) | Pink Memory | Zanybros | —N/a |
| 2016 | "The Wave" (네가 손짓해주면) | Pink Revolution | Unknown | Single released to commemorate five years since debut |
| 2016 | "Only One" (내가 설렐 수 있게) | Pink Revolution | Joo Hee Sun | —N/a |
| 2016 | "Cause You're My Star" (별의 별) | Dear | Tiger Cave | Special Album |
| 2017 | "Always" | Pink Up | Unknown | Single released to commemorate six years since debut |
| 2017 | "Five" | Pink Up | Sillyfilm | —N/a |
| 2018 | "Miracle" (기적 같은 이야기) | Miracle | Unknown | Single released to commemorate seven years since debut |
| 2018 | "I'm So Sick" (1도 없어) | One & Six | Vishop (Vikings League) | —N/a |
| 2019 | "%%" (Eung Eung)" (응응) | Percent | Tiger Cave | —N/a |
| 2019 | "Everybody Ready?" | Look | Unknown | Single released to commemorate eight years since debut |
| 2020 | "Dumhdurum" (덤더럼) | Look | Vishop (Vikings League) | —N/a |
| 2020 | "Moment" | Look | Unknown | Single released to commemorate nine years since debut |
| 2021 | "Thank You" | Non-album single | Yoo Sungkyun (Sunnyvisual) | Single released to commemorate ten years since debut |
| 2022 | "Dilemma" | Horn | Minjun Lee, Hayoung Lee (MosWantd) | —N/a |
| 2023 | "D N D" | Self | Beomjin (VM Project Architecture) | —N/a |
| 2023 | "Pink Christmas" | Non-album single | Unknown | single released for Christmas |
| 2024 | "Wait Me There" | Non-album single | Unknown | Single released to commemorate 13 years since debut |
| 2025 | "Tap Clap" | Non-album single | Unknown | Single released to commemorate 14 years since debut |
| 2026 | "Love Me More" | Re : Love | Joohyung Kim (Aedia Studio) | —N/a |

=== Music videos (Japanese) ===
| Year | Music video | Director(s) | Notes |
|---|---|---|---|
| 2014 | "NoNoNo" | Zanybros | 1st Japanese remake of a single |
| 2015 | "Mr. Chu" | Digipedi | 2nd Japanese remake of a single |
| 2015 | "Luv" | Zanybros | 3rd Japanese remake of a single |
| 2015 | "Sunday Monday" | Koichiro Hamasaki | 4th Japanese remake of a single |
| 2016 | "Brand New Days" | Joo Hee Sun | 1st original Japanese single |
| 2016 | "Summer Time" | Joo Hee Sun | 2nd original Japanese single |
| 2016 | "April 19th" | Joo Hee Sun | 5th Japanese remake of a single |
| 2016 | "My My" | Unknown | Pink Summer Concert vtr |
| 2017 | "Bye Bye" | Joo Hee Sun | 3rd original Japanese single |
| 2017 | "Motto Go! Go!" | Jong Heon Oh | 4th original Japanese single |
| 2017 | "Orion" | Wani (LikeThat Production) | 5th original Japanese single |
