= List of awards and nominations received by Apink =

Apink awards and nominations
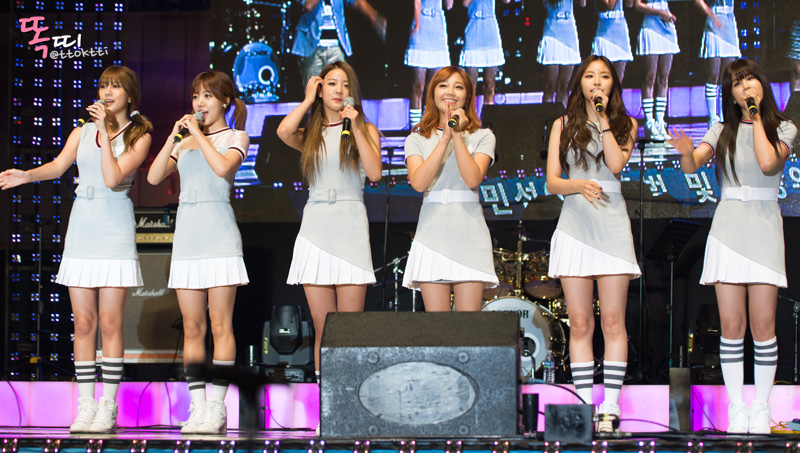
- Apink in 2014
Awards and nominations
Award	Wins	Nominations
Asia Artist Awards	1	1
Asia Model Festival Awards	1	1
Fandom School Awards	1	1
Gaon Chart Music Awards	4	7
Genie Music Awards	0	1
Golden Disc Awards	5	18
Japan Gold Disc Award	1	1
KKBOX Music Award	1	1
Korean Culture Entertainment Awards	3	3
Korean Entertainment Arts Awards	2	2
Korean Wave Awards	1	1
Melon Music Awards	3	15
MAMA Awards	2	9
SBS Award Festival	1	1
Seoul Embassies Day Awards	1	1
Seoul Music Awards	4	26
Soribada Best K-Music Awards	0	6
V Live Awards	1	1
World Music Awards	0	2

Totals (Note: Certain award groups do not simply award one winner. They acknowledge several different recipients, have runners-up, and have third place. Since this is a specific recognition and is different from losing an award, runner-up mentions are considered wins in this award tally. For simplification and to avoid errors, each award in this list has been presumed to have had a prior nomination.)
- Wins: 33
- Nominations: 100

These are the list of awards and nominations received by South Korean girl group Apink.

== Awards and nominations ==
The name of the award ceremony, year presented, category, nominee of the award, and the result of the nomination
Award ceremony	Year	Category	Nominee / work	Result	Ref.
Asia Artist Awards	2017	Best Celebrity Award	Apink	Won	
Asia Model Festival Awards	2012	New Star Award	Apink	Won	
Fandom School Awards	2018	Best Female Group	Apink	Won	
Gaon Chart Music Awards	2012	Rookie of the Year	Apink	Won	
Gaon Chart Music Awards	2013	Hot Trend Award	Apink	Won	
Gaon Chart Music Awards	2014	Hot Performance of the Year	Apink	Won	
Gaon Chart Music Awards	2015	Song of the Year (April)	"Mr. Chu" (On Stage)	Nominated	
Gaon Chart Music Awards	2015	Song of the Year (December)	"Luv"	Won	
Gaon Chart Music Awards	2017	Song of the Year (September)	"Only One"	Nominated	
Gaon Chart Music Awards	2019	Song of the Year (July)	"I'm So Sick"	Nominated	
Gaon Chart Music Awards	2021	Song of the Year (April)	"Dumhdurum"	Nominated	
Genie Music Awards	2019	The Female Group	Apink	Nominated	
Golden Disc Awards	2012	Best New Artist	Apink	Won	
Golden Disc Awards	2014	Popularity Award	Apink	Nominated	
Golden Disc Awards	2014	Album Bonsang	Secret Garden	Nominated	
Golden Disc Awards	2014	Digital Bonsang	"NoNoNo"	Won	
Golden Disc Awards	2015	Album Bonsang	Pink Blossom	Won	
Golden Disc Awards	2015	Digital Bonsang	"Mr. Chu" (On Stage)	Nominated	
Golden Disc Awards	2015	Best Female Performance	Apink	Won	
Golden Disc Awards	2016	Digital Bonsang	"Remember"	Nominated	
Golden Disc Awards	2016	Album Bonsang	Pink Memory	Won	
Golden Disc Awards	2016	Popularity Award (Korea)	Pink Memory	Nominated	
Golden Disc Awards	2016	Global Popularity Award	Pink Memory	Nominated	
Golden Disc Awards	2018	Disk Bonsang	Pink Up	Nominated	
Golden Disc Awards	2018	Popularity Award	Apink	Nominated	
Golden Disc Awards	2019	Digital Bonsang	"I'm So Sick"	Nominated	
Golden Disc Awards	2019	Popularity Award	Apink	Nominated	
Golden Disc Awards	2019	NetEase Most Popular K-pop Star	Apink	Nominated	
Golden Disc Awards	2021	Curaprox Popularity Award	Apink	Nominated	
Golden Disc Awards	2021	QQ Music Popularity Award	Apink	Nominated	
Golden Disc Awards	2021	Digital Daesang	"Dumhdurum"	Nominated	
Golden Disc Awards	2021	Digital Bonsang	"Dumhdurum"	Nominated	
Japan Gold Disc Award	2015	Best New 3 Artists (Asia)	Apink	Won	
KKBOX Music Awards	2016	Special Award	Apink	Won	
Korean Culture Entertainment Awards	2011	Idol Music Rookie Award	Apink	Won	
Korean Culture Entertainment Awards	2013	Kpop 10 Singer Group	Apink	Won	
Korean Culture Entertainment Awards	2015	Kpop 10 Singer Group	Apink	Won	
Korean Entertainment Art Awards	2014	Netizen Awards	Apink	Won	
Korean Entertainment Art Awards	2015	Best Female Group	Apink	Won	
Korean Wave Awards	2018	Hallyu Singer Award	Apink	Won	
MAMA Awards	2011	Best New Female Artist	Apink	Won	
MAMA Awards	2013	Next Generation Global Star	Apink	Won	
MAMA Awards	2014	Best Female Group	Apink	Nominated	
MAMA Awards	2014	Artist of the Year	Apink	Nominated	
MAMA Awards	2015	Best Female Group	Apink	Nominated	
MAMA Awards	2015	Artist of the Year	Apink	Nominated	
MAMA Awards	2017	Best Dance Performance Female Group	"Five"	Nominated	
MAMA Awards	2017	Song of the Year	"Five"	Nominated	
MAMA Awards	2025	Fans' Choice Top 10 – Female	Apink	Nominated	
MAMA Awards	2026	Fans' Choice Top 10 – Female	Apink	Won	
Melon Music Awards	2014	Top 10 Artist	Apink	Nominated	
Melon Music Awards	2014	Song of the Year	"Mr. Chu" (On Stage)	Nominated	
Melon Music Awards	2014	Best Music Video	"Mr. Chu" (On Stage)	Nominated	
Melon Music Awards	2014	Best Female Dance	"Mr. Chu" (On Stage)	Won	
Melon Music Awards	2015	Top 10 Artist	Apink	Won	
Melon Music Awards	2015	Artist of the Year	Apink	Nominated	
Melon Music Awards	2015	Song of the Year	"Luv"	Nominated	
Melon Music Awards	2015	Album of the Year	Pink Luv	Nominated	
Melon Music Awards	2015	Netizen Popularity Award	"Remember"	Nominated	
Melon Music Awards	2017	Top 10 Artist	Apink	Nominated	
Melon Music Awards	2018	Top 10 Artist	Apink	Won	
Melon Music Awards	2018	Artist of the Year	Apink	Nominated	
Melon Music Awards	2018	Song of the Year	"I'm So Sick"	Nominated	
Melon Music Awards	2020	Top 10 Artist	Apink	Nominated	
Melon Music Awards	2020	Netizen Popularity Award	Apink	Nominated	
SBS Award Festival	2015	TOP 10 Artist	Apink	Won	
Seoul Embassies Day Awards	2015	Hanbit Awards	Apink (along with VIXX and Rainbow)	Won	
Seoul Music Awards	2012	New Artist Award	Apink	Won	
Seoul Music Awards	2013	Popularity Award	Apink	Nominated	
Seoul Music Awards	2013	Bonsang Award	"Hush"	Nominated	
Seoul Music Awards	2014	Popularity Award	Apink	Nominated	
Seoul Music Awards	2014	Daesang Award	"No No No"	Nominated	
Seoul Music Awards	2014	Bonsang Award	"No No No"	Won	
Seoul Music Awards	2015	Popularity Award	Apink	Nominated	
Seoul Music Awards	2015	Hallyu Special Award	Apink	Nominated	
Seoul Music Awards	2015	Daesang Award	"Mr. Chu"	Nominated	
Seoul Music Awards	2015	Bonsang Award	"Mr. Chu"	Won	
Seoul Music Awards	2016	Popularity Award	Apink	Nominated	
Seoul Music Awards	2016	Daesang Award	"Remember"	Nominated	
Seoul Music Awards	2016	Bonsang Award	"Remember"	Won	
Seoul Music Awards	2018	Bonsang Award	"Five"	Nominated	
Seoul Music Awards	2018	Popularity Award	Apink	Nominated	
Seoul Music Awards	2018	Hallyu Special Award	Apink	Nominated	
Seoul Music Awards	2019	Bonsang Award	"I'm So Sick"	Nominated	
Seoul Music Awards	2019	Popularity Award	Apink	Nominated	
Seoul Music Awards	2019	Hallyu Special Award	Apink	Nominated	
Seoul Music Awards	2020	Popularity Award	Apink	Nominated	
Seoul Music Awards	2020	Hallyu Special Award	Apink	Nominated	
Seoul Music Awards	2020	QQ Music Most Popular K-Pop Artist Award	Apink	Nominated	
Seoul Music Awards	2021	Bonsang Award	Apink	Nominated	
Seoul Music Awards	2021	Popularity Award	Apink	Nominated	
Seoul Music Awards	2021	K-wave Popularity Award	Apink	Nominated	
Seoul Music Awards	2022	U+Idol Live Best Artist Award	Apink	Nominated	
Soribada Best K-Music Awards	2017	Bonsang Award	Apink	Nominated	
Soribada Best K-Music Awards	2018	Popularity Award (Female)	Apink	Nominated	
Soribada Best K-Music Awards	2019	Bonsang Award	Apink	Nominated	
Soribada Best K-Music Awards	2019	Popularity Award (Female)	Apink	Nominated	
Soribada Best K-Music Awards	2020	Bonsang Award	Apink	Nominated	
Soribada Best K-Music Awards	2020	Popularity Award (Female)	Apink	Nominated	
V Live Awards	2017	Top 10 Global Artist	Apink	Won	
World Music Awards	2014	World Best Group	Apink	Nominated	
World Music Awards	2014	World Best Live Act	Apink	Nominated	

== Other accolades ==
=== Listicles ===
Name of publisher, year listed, name of listicle, and placement
Publisher	Year	Listicle	Placement	Ref.
Forbes	2015	Korea Power Celebrity	18th	
