= 28th Golden Disc Awards =

2014 South Korean music awards ceremony

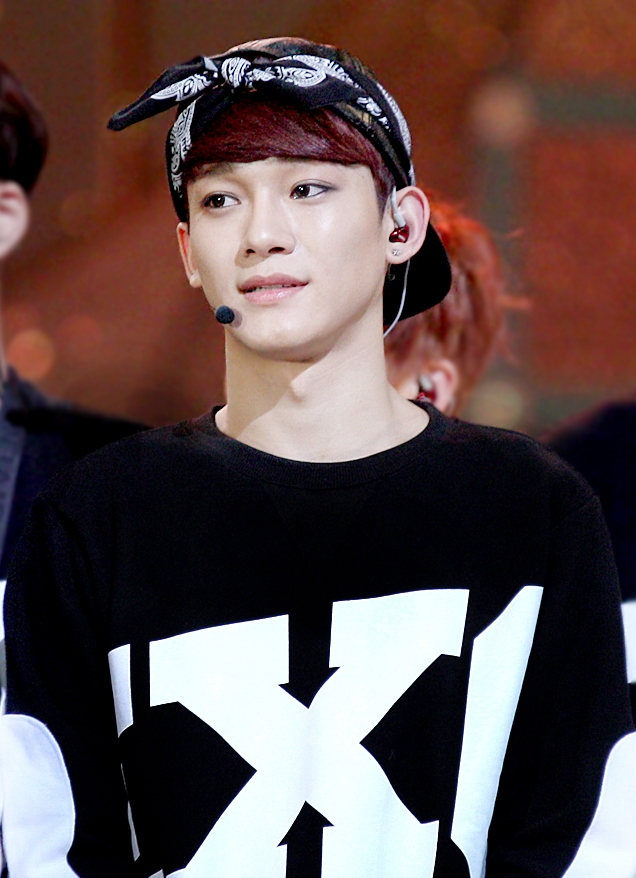
- Date: January 16, 2014
- Location: Grand Peace Palace, Kyung Hee University, Seoul
- Country: South Korea
- Hosted by: Minho; Jung Yong-hwa; Yoon Doo-joon; Taeyeon; Tiffany; Oh Sang-jin

Television/radio coverage
- Network: JTBC

The 28th Golden Disc Awards ceremony was held on January 16, 2014. The JTBC network broadcast the show from Kyung Hee University's Grand Peace Palace in Seoul. Minho, Jung Yong-hwa and Yoon Doo-joon served as hosts on the first day, with Taeyeon, Tiffany and Oh Sang-jin on the second.

== Criteria ==
Albums and songs released between January 1, 2013, and December 31, 2013, were eligible to be nominated for the 28th Golden Disc Awards. The winners of the digital music, album and rookie categories were determined by music sales (60%), a panel of music experts (20%) and online votes (20%). Music sales were based on data from Gaon Music Chart, Bugs!, Cyworld, Daum, Naver Music and Genie Music. The Popularity Award was based on online votes (80%) and a panel of music experts (20%).

== Winners and nominees ==
=== Main awards ===
Winners and nominees are listed in alphabetical order. Winners are listed first and emphasized in bold.

Digital Daesang (Song of the Year)	Disc Daesang (Album of the Year)
**Psy – "Gentleman"**; 2NE1 – "Missing You"; 4Minute – "What's Your Name?"; Ailee – "U&I"; Apink – "No No No"; CNBLUE – "I'm Sorry"; Davichi – "Turtle"; Lee Seung-chul – "My Love"; Sistar – "Give It to Me"	**Exo – XOXO**; B1A4 – What's Happening?; Beast – Hard to Love, How to Love; Cho Yong-pil – Hello; f(x) – Pink Tape; Girls' Generation – I Got a Boy; Infinite – New Challenge; Shinee – Dream Girl – The Misconceptions of You
Digital Song Bonsang	Album Bonsang
**2NE1 – "Missing You"**; **4Minute – "What's Your Name?"**; **Ailee – "U&I"**; **Apink – "No No No"**; **CNBLUE – "I'm Sorry"**; **Davichi – "Turtle"**; **Lee Seung-chul – "My Love"**; **Psy – "Gentleman"**; **Sistar – "Give It to Me"**; 4Men – "Propose Song"; Baechigi – "Shower of Tears" (feat. Ailee); Cho Yong-pil – "Bounce"; Crayon Pop – "Bar Bar Bar"; Dynamic Duo – "Baaam" (feat. Muzie); Exo – "Growl"; G-Dragon – "Crooked"; Geeks – "How Are You" (feat. Hareem); Girl's Day – "Expect"; Girls' Generation – "I Got a Boy"; Huh Gak – "Monodrama" (feat. Yoo Seung-woo); IU – "The Red Shoes"; K.Will – "Love Blossom"; Lee Hi – "Rose"; Lee Hyori – "Miss Korea"; Lyn – "Tonight" (feat. Baechigi); Miss A – "Miss A"; Roy Kim – "Bom Bom Bom"; Secret – "YooHoo"; Sistar19 – "Gone Not Around Any Longer"; Trouble Maker – "Now"	**B1A4 – What's Happening?**; **Beast – Hard to Love, How to Love**; **Cho Yong-pil – Hello**; **Exo – XOXO**; **f(x) – Pink Tape**; **Girls' Generation – I Got a Boy**; **Infinite – New Challenge**; **Shinee – Dream Girl – The Misconceptions of You**; 2AM – One Spring Day; 2PM – Grown; Apink – Secret Garden; B.A.P – Badman; Block B – Very Good; Busker Busker – Busker Busker 2nd Album; CNBLUE – Re:Blue; F.T. Island – Thanks To; G-Dragon – Coup d'Etat; Henry – Trap; IU – Modern Times; Kara – Full Bloom; Kim Hyun-joong – Round 3; Lee Seung-chul – My Love; MBLAQ – Love Beat; Myname – Myname 1st Mini Album; Seungri – Let's Talk About Love; Shinhwa – The Classic; T-ara – Again; Teen Top – Teen Top Class; VIXX – Jekyll; ZE:A – Illusion
Rookie of the Year (Digital Category)	Rookie of the Year (Album Category)
**Crayon Pop**; **Lim Kim**; 2Eyes; Ladies' Code; Yoo Seung-woo	**BTS**; **Roy Kim**; Boys Republic; History; Jung Joon-young
Popularity Award
**Beast (album)**; **Girls' Generation (digital)**; **Roy Kim (digital)**; **Shinee (album)**; List of nominees: 2AM; 2Eyes; 2NE1; 2PM; 4Men; 4Minute; Ailee; Apink; B1A4; Baechigi; B.A.P; Block B; Boys Republic; BTS; Busker Busker; Cho Yong-pil; CNBLUE; Davichi; Dynamic Duo; Crayon Pop; Exo; F.T. Island; f(x); G-Dragon; Geeks; Girl's Day; Henry; History; Huh Gak; Infinite; IU; Jung Joon-young; Kara; Kim Hyun-joong; K.Will; Ladies' Code; Lee Hi; Lee Hyori; Lee Seung-chul; Lim Kim; Lyn; MBLAQ; Miss A; Myname; Psy; Secret; Seungri; Shinhwa; Sistar; Sistar19; T-ara; Teen Top; Trouble Maker; VIXX; Yoo Seung-woo; ZE:A

=== Special awards ===
Award	Winner
Best Hip-Hop Award	Baechigi
Ceci Asia Icon Award	Shinee
Ceci Asia Icon Award	Sistar
Producer Award	Hong Seung-seong
Special Award	Deulgukhwa
Goodwill Star Award	CNBLUE
