= Pink Revolution (album) =

Studio album by Apink
- Released: September 26, 2016
- Recorded: 2016
- Genre: K-pop; dance-pop; R&B
- Length: 33:10
- Label: Plan A Entertainment; LOEN Entertainment (Distributor)

Apink chronology
Pink Season (2015)	Pink Revolution (2016)	Dear (2016)

Singles from Pink Revolution
- 1. "The Wave" Released: April 19, 2016; 2. "Only One" Released: September 26, 2016

Pink Revolution is the third full-length studio album by South Korean girl group Apink. It was released on September 26, 2016 following a hiatus of one year and two months. The title track, "Only One", was used to promote the album along with B-tracks "Boom Pow Love" and "Ding Dong".

== Release ==
The full album was released on September 26, 2016 at midnight. Shortly following the album's release, the title track topped seven Korean music charts.

== Singles ==
The first single from the album, "The Wave" (네가 손짓해주면), was written by group leader Park Cho-rong and was released on April 19, 2016, as a 5th Anniversary song for Apink's fans. Pink Revolution's title track, "Only One", was released on September 26, 2016, and was written and arranged by Black Eyed Pilseung.

== Track listing ==
No.	Title	Lyrics	Music	Arrangement	Length
1.	"Only One" (내가 설렐 수 있게)	Black Eyed Pilseung	Black Eyed Pilseung	Rado	3:13
2.	"Oh Yes"	Beom & Nang	Beom & Nang	Shinsadong Tiger	3:23
3.	"Boom Pow Love"	Beom & Nang, Chang Hye-won	Jin By Jin, Anne Judith Stokke Wik, Nermin Harambasic, Hayley Aitken, Remee Jackson	Jin By Jin	3:16
4.	"Fairy"	Jang Yun-jeong	검은띠뮤직(B.B.M)	검은띠뮤직(B.B.M)	4:11
5.	"Drummer Boy"	Lee Woo-Min ‘collapsedone’, Mayu Wakisaka	Lee Woo-Min ‘collapsedone’, Mayu Wakisaka	Lee Woo-Min ‘collapsedone’	3:36
6.	"To. Us"	ChoRong	Jang Jeong-seok, Yun Jong-seong, Ayaka Miyake	Jang Jeong-seok, Yun Jong-seong	3:34
7.	"Ding Dong"	Zigzag Note, Kang Myeong-sin, 노는어린이	Zigzag Note, Kang Myeong-sin	Zigzag Note, Kang Myeong-sin	3:48
8.	"Catch me"	Beom & Nang	Beom & Nang	Beom & Nang	3:42
9.	"The Wave" (네가 손짓해주면)	Kim Jin-hwan, ChoRong	Kim Jin-hwan	Kim Jin-hwan	4:19
