= Dear (Apink album) =

Compilation album by Apink
- Released: December 15, 2016
- Studio: Seoul, South Korea
- Length: 42:45 (digital)
- Label: Play M Entertainment (Distributed by LOEN Entertainment)

Apink chronology
Pink Revolution (2016)	Dear (2016)	Pink Doll (2016)

Singles from Dear
- 1. "Cause You're My Star" Released: December 15, 2016

Dear is the compilation album (marketed as "special album") by South Korean girl group Apink, released on December 15, 2016. The album's lead single is the title track "Cause You're My Star".

== Track listing ==
No.	Title	Lyrics	Music	Length
1.	"Dear (Whisper)" (CD only)	Apink	Apink	5:19
2.	"Cause You're My Star" (별의 별)	Duble Sidekick, Sae-byuk, Jin-lee	Duble Sidekick, Sae-byuk, Jin-lee	3:11
3.	"Miss U"	ZigZag Note, Captain Planet, Lee Shin-sung	ZigZag Note, Captain Planet	4:07
4.	"NoNoNo" (ballad version)	Shinsadong Tiger, Kupa	Shinsadong Tiger, Kupa	4:19
5.	"Only One" (내가 설렐 수 있게) (R&B Ver.)	Black Eyed Pilseung	Black Eyed Pilseung	3:49
6.	"LUV" (ballad version)	Shinsadong Tiger, Beom & Nang	Shinsadong Tiger, Beom & Nang	4:46
7.	"Cliché" (흔한 일) (sung by Chorong and Naeun)	Chorong, Naeun	Captain Planet, Kang Myung-sin	3:44
8.	"Heaven" (잃어버린 조각) (sung by Bomi and Namjoo)	Bomi, Namjoo	ZigZag Note	3:27
9.	"It's You" (그 봄날, 이 가을) (sung by Eunji and Hayoung)	Eunji, Hayoung	Jung Tae-soo, Park Jun	3:39
10.	"Mr. Chu" (original) (instrumental)		Duble Sidekick, SEION	3:35
11.	"Once Upon a Time" (동화 같은 사랑) (instrumental)		Duble Sidekick, Tenzo & Tasco	3:52
12.	"April 19" (4월 19일) (instrumental)		Kim Jin-hwan	4:16

== Charts ==
=== Album ===
Chart	Peak position
Gaon Weekly album chart	2
Gaon Monthly album chart	10
Gaon Yearly album chart	80

=== Sales and certifications ===
Provider	Amount
Gaon physical sales	35,211+
Oricon physical sales	1,723+
