= Pink Memory =

Studio album by Apink
- Released: July 16, 2015
- Recorded: Cube Studio, Seoul, South Korea; 2015
- Genres: K-pop; dance-pop
- Length: 36:46
- Labels: A Cube Entertainment; LOEN Entertainment (Distributor)

Apink chronology
Pink Luv (2014)	Pink Memory (2015)	Pink Season (2015)

Singles from Pink Memory
- 1. "Promise U" Released: April 19, 2015; 2. "Remember" Released: July 16, 2015; 3. "Petal" Released: August 3, 2015

Pink Memory (stylized as Pink MEMORY) is the second full-length studio album by South Korean girl group Apink. It was released on July 16, 2015. The title track, "Remember", was used to promote the album.

== Release and promotion ==
The full album was released on July 17, 2015.

The promotions of the song "Remember" started on July 16, 2015 on Music Bank. The song is being promoted on the shows, The Show, M! Countdown, Music Core and Inkigayo.

== Singles ==
The first single from the album, "Promise U", was released as a digitally on April 19, 2015.

The album's title track, "Remember", was released on July 16, 2015. The song was written and composed by Shinsadong Tiger.

The album's second single, "Petal", was released on August 3, 2015.

== Track listing ==
No.	Title	Lyrics	Music	Arrangement	Length
1.	"Remember"	Shinsadong Tiger, Beom & Nang	Shinsadong Tiger, Beom & Nang	Shinsadong Tiger, GnO	3:54
2.	"Perfume"	G-High, Kim Yu-seok	G-High, Kim Yu-seok	G-High, Kim Yu-seok	3:04
3.	"Attracted to U" (끌려)	Marco	Marco	Marco	3:43
4.	"Déjà vu"	Park Cho-rong	Choi Yong-chan	Choi Yong-chan	3:42
5.	"Petal" (꽃잎점)	Beom & Nang	Beom & Nang	Beom & Nang	3:36
6.	"What a Boy Wants"	Oh Ha-young, AK47	Han Sang-won	Han Sang-won	3:30
7.	"I Do"	Nikel, Wiidope	Nikel, Wiidope	Nikel, Wiidope	3:28
8.	"A Wonderful Love" (신기하죠)	Playing Child, ZigZagNote	Playing Child, ZigZagNote	Playing Child, ZigZagNote	4:11
9.	"Remember" (Instrumental)		Shinsadong Tiger	Shinsadong Tiger	3:54
10.	"Promise U" (새끼손가락)	Jung Eun-ji, Beom & Nang	Jung Eun-ji, Beom & Nang	Jung Eun-ji, Beom & Nang	3:44
Total length:					36:46

== Charts ==
Chart	Peak position
Gaon album chart	2

=== Sales and certifications ===
Provider (2015)	Amount
Gaon physical sales	90,080+
