= Pink Season (Apink album) =

2015 album by Apink

Studio album by Apink
- Released: August 26, 2015
- Recorded: 2014–2015
- Genre: J-Pop
- Language: Japanese
- Label: Universal Music Japan

Apink chronology
Pink Memory (2015)	Pink Season (2015)	Pink Revolution (2016)

Singles from Pink Season
- 1. "No No No" Released: October 22, 2014; 2. "Mr. Chu" Released: February 18, 2015; 3. "Luv" Released: May 20, 2015

Pink Season is the debut Japanese album by the South Korean girl group Apink, and was released by Universal Music Japan on August 26, 2015.

== Background and release ==
After releasing three singles in the Japanese market, including Limited Edition "No No No", "Mr. Chu", and "Luv", Apink released their first Japanese studio album Pink Season on August 26, 2015.

== Editions ==
The album was originally released in three different editions: Limited Edition A, Limited Edition B, and the Regular Edition.

== Singles ==
"No No No" is the first title track and the debut song in Japanese. The single was the first ever Japanese single released by A Pink on October 22, 2014 in Japan. A new version of the music video was filmed to accompany the Japanese version, and the teaser was released on September 29, 2014. On September 30, 2015, the full music video was released.

Apink also released their second Japanese single "Mr. Chu" on February 18, 2015. They releases the music video teaser on January 21, 2015. The full music video was released on January 22, 2015.

The last single before the album "Luv" was released on May 20, 2015. The music video teaser was released on April 15, 2015. The full music video was released on April 16, 2015.

== Track listing ==
CD
No.	Title	Lyrics	Music	Length
1.	"Pink Season"			1:34
2.	"No No No" (Japanese version)	PA-NON	S.Tiger, Kupa	3:40
3.	"Bubibu" (Japanese version)	HASEGAWA	GOLD Doo Hyun, Playkid(Kim Won Hyun)	3:43
4.	"U You" (Japanese version)	Ayaka, Ume	GOLD Doo Hyun, Playkid(Kim Won Hyun), Oh Hyeon Ho	3:26
5.	"I Don't Know" (モㇽラヨ) (Japanese version)	HI-D	SUPER CHANGDDAI	3:46
6.	"Remember" (Japanese version)	PA-NON	S.Tiger, Beom&Nang	3:52
7.	"Mr. Chu" (Japanese version)	Shoko Fujibayashi	Duble Sidekick, David Kim	3:35
8.	"My My" (Japanese version)	MEG.ME	Rado, Shisadong Tiger	3:54
9.	"Hush" (Japanese version)	HASEGAWA	HyuWoo, Rado	3:31
10.	"I'm Not An Angel" (天使じゃない) (Japanese version)	HI-D	KZ, Mr.Bear	3:27
11.	"Good Morning Baby" (Japanese version)	Yuto Yamagishi	Duble Sidekick, Tenzo&Tasco	3:46
12.	"Luv" (Japanese version)	KABUTA	S.Tiger, Beom&Nang	4:01
13.	"April 19th" (4月19日) (Japanese version)	Park Cho Rong	Kim Jin Hwan	4:22

== Release history ==
Region	Date	Format	Edition	Distributor
Japan	August 26, 2015	CD	Standard	Universal Music Japan
