= Pink Luv =

EP by Apink
- Released: November 24, 2014
- Recorded: 2013–2014
- Studio: A Cube Studios
- Genres: K-pop; dance-pop
- Label: A Cube Entertainment (Distributed by LOEN Entertainment)

Apink chronology
| Pink Blossom (2014) | Pink Luv (2014) | Pink Memory (2015) |

Singles from Pink Luv
- 1. "Good Morning Baby" Released: January 13, 2014; 2. "Luv" Released: November 24, 2014

Pink Luv (stylized as Pink LUV) is the fifth EP by South Korean girl group Apink, released on November 24, 2014. The album's lead single is the title track "Luv".

== Release and promotion ==
The EP Pink Luv was released on November 24. It debuted at number 1 on South Korea's Gaon Album Chart while "Luv" debuted at number 2 on the Gaon Digital Chart and stayed there for two weeks. The song sold 1,490,824 copies and scored Apink's first three triple crown wins in the three major music shows (The Show, Music Core and Inkigayo.) They were the first girl group to achieve this.

Apink performed a snippet of "Secret", a track on their album, in addition to a full performance of "Luv" on KBS's Music Bank on November 21. This was followed by additional comebacks on music programs including MBC's Show! Music Core, SBS's Inkigayo, SBS M's The Show, MBC M's Show Champion and Mnet's M Countdown. Apink received 17 trophies in total on the aforementioned music shows with "Luv", which is still the highest number of wins for a single song for a girl group.

== Track listing ==
Digital and CD mini album.
| No. | Title | Lyrics | Music | Length |
|---|---|---|---|---|
| 1. | "Luv" | Shinsadong Tiger; Beom & Nang | Shinsadong Tiger; Beom & Nang | 03:58 |
| 2. | "Wanna Be" | ChoRong | Son Young-jin; Big Sancho | 03:40 |
| 3. | "Secret" | Lee Won-hee | Lee Won-hee | 03:57 |
| 4. | "I'm Not an Angel" (천사가 아냐; Cheonsaga Anya) | KZ; D'Day | KZ; Mr. Gomdol | 03:26 |
| 5. | "Once Upon a Time" (동화 같은 사랑; Donghwa Gateun Sarang; lit. "Love Like a Fairytale") | Duble Sidekick; David Kim | Duble Sidekick; Tenzo & Tasco | 03:52 |
| 6. | "Luv" (Instrumental) | | Shinsadong Tiger; Beom & Nang | 03:58 |
| Total length: | | | | 22:51 |

CD bonus tracks
| No. | Title | Lyrics | Music | Length |
|---|---|---|---|---|
| 7. | "Good Morning Baby" | Duble Sidekick | Duble Sidekick | 03:40 |
| 8. | "My Darling" (Apink BnN) | Brave Brothers | Brave Brothers | 03:05 |
| Total length: | | | | 29:36 |

== Charts ==
=== Album ===
| Chart | Peak position |
|---|---|
| Gaon Weekly Album Chart | 1 |
| Gaon Monthly Album Chart | 4 |
| Gaon Yearly Album Chart | 36 |

=== Single ===
| Chart (2014) | Peak position |
|---|---|
| South Korea (Gaon) | 2 |
| South Korea (Kpop Hot 100) | 2 |
| US World Digital Songs (Billboard) | 5 |

=== Sales and certifications ===
| Provider | Amount |
|---|---|
| Gaon Digital Sales | 1,490,824+ |

=== Sales and certifications ===
| Provider | Amount |
|---|---|
| Gaon physical sales | 79,735+ |
| Oricon physical sales | 4,805+ |

== Music program wins ==
Music programs awards
| Song | Program | Date (17 total) | Score |
|---|---|---|---|
| "Luv" | The Show (SBS M) | December 2, 2014 | 7,237 |
| "Luv" | The Show (SBS M) | December 9, 2014 | 8,257 |
| "Luv" | The Show (SBS M) | December 16, 2014 | 8,498 |
| "Luv" | Music Bank (KBS2) | December 5, 2014 | 8,599 |
| "Luv" | Music Bank (KBS2) | December 12, 2014 | 8,021 |
| "Luv" | Music Bank (KBS2) | December 19, 2014 | 6,006 |
| "Luv" | Music Bank (KBS2) | December 26, 2014 | 4,960 |
| "Luv" | Show! Music Core (MBC) | December 6, 2014 | 9,237 |
| "Luv" | Show! Music Core (MBC) | December 13, 2014 | 7,822 |
| "Luv" | Show! Music Core (MBC) | December 20, 2014 | 7,185 |
| "Luv" | Show! Music Core (MBC) | January 3, 2015 | 7,670 |
| "Luv" | Show! Music Core (MBC) | January 10, 2015 | 7,745 |
| "Luv" | Inkigayo (SBS) | December 7, 2014 | 8,710 |
| "Luv" | Inkigayo (SBS) | December 14, 2014 | 7,915 |
| "Luv" | Inkigayo (SBS) | December 28, 2014 | 8,382 |
| "Luv" | M Countdown (Mnet) | December 18, 2014 | 7,154 |
| "Luv" | M Countdown (Mnet) | December 25, 2014 | 7,791 |

== Release history ==
| Country | Date | Format | Label |
|---|---|---|---|
| South Korea | November 24, 2014 | CD, Digital download | Plan A Entertainment; LOEN Entertainment |
