= Pink Blossom =

EP by Apink
- Released: March 31, 2014
- Recorded: 2013
- Genres: K-pop, dance-pop
- Labels: A Cube Entertainment (Distributed by LOEN Entertainment) (ISWC: L200001007)

Apink chronology
Secret Garden (2013)	Pink Blossom (2014)	Pink Luv (2014)

Singles from Pink Blossom
- 1. "Mr. Chu" Released: March 31, 2014

Pink Blossom is the fourth EP by South Korean girl group Apink, released on March 31, 2014. Group leader, Chorong, wrote two songs for the album. The music video for title track "Mr. Chu", composed by Duble Sidekick, was released on March 31 along with the album. The song peaked at number 2 on Billboard's K-Pop Hot 100. Apink won six music show trophies for "Mr. Chu" and the song was the eighth best selling digital song in 2014, according to Gaon's year-end chart. They released the music video for "Crystal" on June 14. Pink Blossom was the second best selling album of the week of its release on the Gaon Weekly chart and charted at #31 on the 2014 Gaon Annual Album chart with 66,139 copies sold, becoming the fourth best selling girl group album of the year.

== Release ==
On March 13, a picture was uploaded on Apink's official Facebook page showing a scoreboard with scores of 3-31 with a short description saying “#Apink 2014.03.31.”, hinting March 31 as the group's comeback date, nine months since the release of Secret Garden. On March 17, A Cube Entertainment unveiled a preview for the album poster on Apink's official Facebook page and announced that a 40,000 poster would be included with the album purchase. The poster showed the Apink members wearing navy blue dresses and posing with serious expressions, while holding a book.

On March 20, Apink announced that they would be returning with 6 new songs for their fourth mini-album Pink Blossom on March 31. “Mr. Chu”, an upbeat dance track composed by Duble Sidekick and Seion would be the title song. Due to a mistake of a staff member from the album production, the jacket album photos that were scheduled to be revealed on March 31 with the release of the songs was leaked and spreading online. “The jacket photos that were leaked were originally scheduled to be revealed on March 31 with the release of the songs. It appears that the image leakage was due to a mistake of a staff member, who is involved in the fourth mini album production. However, we decided that due to the unexpected accident that we’ll release the photos on March 20.” said A Cube.

A video teaser featuring Apink's six members participating in a photo shoot for the new album cover was released with "Mr. Chu" in the background. On March 24, a medley clip was released, giving a short preview of all the six tracks from the upcoming album. On March 27, A Cube released music video teaser for "Mr. Chu" on Apink official YouTube Channel. The teaser features Apink members dressed in tennis outfit holding presents on their lap while watching a tennis match played by the "Mr. Chu". The full music video was released together with the 4th mini album Pink Blossom on March 31.

== Promotion ==
Apink performed a snippet of "Sunday Monday" in addition to a full performance of "Mr. Chu" for the first time on KBS's Music Bank on April 4. This was followed by additional comebacks on music programs including MBC's Show! Music Core, SBS's Inkigayo, MBC Music's Show Champion and Mnet's M! Countdown.

On April 16, Apink decided to halt promotional activities and cancel all their schedules including their third anniversary fanmeeting on April 19 to pay respect for the victims of Sewol Tragedy. A Cube released a statement, "Due to the magnitude of the passenger ship sinking, Apink felt too much pain and did not think they could sing for their fans with a light heart, which is how this decision came to be made. We plan on having the canceled fan meeting some other time in the future and will later announce the new date and location."

The group resume promotions after 3 weeks, performing at Mnet's M! Countdown on May 8. They wrapped up promotions for Pink Blossom on May 25.

== Singles ==
The music video for "Mr. Chu" was released on March 31, 2014, and was directed by Song Wonmo and Park Sangwoo of Digipedi Studio. The song peaked at number 2 on the Gaon Digital Chart and Billboard's K-Pop Hot 100, and ranked eighth on the year-end Gaon Digital Chart.

Group leader, Chorong wrote the lyrics for two of the songs from the album, "Love Story" and "So Long".

== Track listing ==
Digital download
No.	Title	Lyrics	Music	Length
1.	"Sunday Monday"	Beomi, Nangi	Nickel	03:34
2.	"Mr. Chu" (On Stage)	Duble Sidekick, David Kim	Duble Sidekick, SEION	03:24
3.	"Crystal"	e.one	e.one	03:24
4.	"Love Story" (사랑동화; Sarangdonghwa; lit. "Fairytale Love")	Chorong	Kim Jinhwan	03:58
5.	"So Long"	Chorong	Master Key	03:41
6.	"Mr. Chu" (Original)	Duble Sidekick, David Kim	Duble Sidekick, SEION	03:34
7.	"Mr. Chu" (On Stage) (Instrumental)		Duble Sidekick, SEION	03:24

== Charts ==
Chart	Peak position
Gaon Weekly album chart	2
Gaon Monthly album chart	5
Gaon Yearly album chart	31

=== Sales ===
Provider (2014)	Amount
Gaon physical sales	75,325+
Oricon physical sales	10,000+

== Release history ==
Country	Date	Format	Label	Catalog
South Korea	March 31, 2014	CD, Digital download	A Cube Entertainment; LOEN Entertainment	L200001007
