= Mr. Chu =

- Limited Edition A

Single by Apink

from the album Pink Blossom and Pink Season
- B-side: "Hush" (Japan)
- Released: March 31, 2014 (KR); February 18, 2015 (JP)
- Genre: Pop; dance-pop; electropop
- Length: 3:24
- Label: A Cube Entertainment (Korea); Universal Music (Japan)
- Songwriters: Duble Sidekick; SEION; David Kim (Korea); Shoko Fujibayashi (Japan)
- Producer: Duble Sidekick

Apink singles chronology
"Good Morning Baby" (2014)	"Mr. Chu" (2014)	"My Darling" (2014)
""NoNoNo" (ノーノーノー)" (2014)	""Mr. Chu" (ミスター・チュウ)" (2015)	""Luv" (ラブ)" (2015)

Music video
- "Mr. Chu" on YouTube "Mr. Chu" (Japanese Version) on YouTube

"Mr. Chu" is a song by South Korean girl group Apink. The song is their 5th Korean single and served as the lead single from their 4th mini-album Pink Blossom. The song was composed by Duble Sidekick. It was released on March 31, 2014, by A Cube Entertainment. The song's music video, directed by Digipedi, was released on the same day. Apink performed the song for the first time on KBS's Music Bank on April 4.

Commercially, the song peaked at number 2 on the Billboard K-pop Hot 100. Apink won six music show trophies for "Mr. Chu" and wrapped up promotions for Mr. Chu on May 25. The song was the eighth best selling digital song in 2014, according to Gaon's year-end chart. "Mr. Chu" was used for G9 TV commercial featuring Apink and comedian Lee Guk-Joo. The Japanese version of "Mr. Chu" was released as their second Japanese single on February 18, 2015. On January 22, 2015, the short PV for "Mr. Chu (on-stage)" Japanese version was released.

== Release ==
On March 20, Apink released member teaser photos for their fourth mini album Pink Blossom. The photos came with the news that the title was called "Mr. Chu", an upbeat dance track composed by Duble Sidekick, David Kim and Seion. On the following day they released a video teaser featuring Apink members participating in a photo shoot for the new album cover using the instrumental version of "Mr. Chu" as the background music, giving the first preview for the song. On March 24, a medley clip was released, giving a short preview of all six tracks of the upcoming album. "Mr. Chu" was used for G9 TV commercial featuring Apink and comedian Lee Guk-Joo. In the commercial video, Apink started with dancing the choreography of "Mr. Chu" and Lee Guk-Joo entered and dance a comical dance along with the song.

=== Japanese version ===
On December 19, 2014, Apink announced they would release a Japanese version of "Mr. Chu (on stage)" for their second Japanese single on February 18, 2015, 4 months after the release of their debut single "NoNoNo". Four different cover photos for "Mr. Chu" album cover were released on January 14. On January 22, 2015, the short PV for "Mr. Chu" 'on-stage' Japanese version was released through Universal Music YouTube channel ahead of their comeback. The music video used similar tennis theme concept just like the Korean version. In the video, the group wears a pink tennis dress and black-and-white school uniforms. The video features Apink members dance to the song chorus, use their signature moves of blowing kisses at the tennis court.

On February 18, Universal Music Japan released "Mr. Chu" as a CD single with "Hush" as a B-side. Instrumental versions of both songs were also included. It will be released in nine versions: eight limited editions (two CD+DVD versions and six limited CD only editions, including a solo jacket cover and a trading card of the correspondent member) and a regular edition. The Japanese lyrics were written by Japanese lyricist Shoko Fujibayashi who had previously written lyrics for South Korean singer BoA while "Hush" were written by Japanese lyricist Hasegawa.

== Music video ==
On March 27, A Cube uploaded a twenty six-second teaser trailer for the music video of "Mr. Chu" on Apink's official YouTube Channel. The teaser features Apink members dressed in tennis outfit holding presents on their laps while watching a tennis match played by the "Mr. Chu". The full music video was released together with the 4th mini album Pink Blossom on March 31. A choreography practice video for "Mr. Chu" was released on May 29.

The music video was directed by Digipedi Studio. The shooting lasted 24 hours in a studio located at Gyeonggi-do area. Digipedi used complementary colors with graphic layouts and fixed cuts to make each short story. The music video starts with a single close up of all of the girls and a mysterious man picking up a tennis ball. Throughout the music video, it seems like Mr. Chu is pointed out to be the popular guy who plays tennis while the girl watching attentively. The girls can be seen squeezing love letters and gifts into his locker that already stuffed with presents. At the end of the music video, they show the calendar of March with all dates being crossed off until a kiss mark on the 31st, pointed out to the day the music video was released.

== Live performances ==
Apink performed "Mr. Chu" for the first time at KBS's Music Bank on April 4, together with a snippet of another track from their album, "Sunday Monday" This was followed by additional comebacks on music programs including MBC's Show! Music Core, SBS's Inkigayo, MBC Music's Show Champion and Mnet's M! Countdown. On April 7, industry professionals reviewed Apink's comeback stage on the three public broadcasts and SBS's Inkigayo comeback stage was chosen to be the best one. One choreographer said, " The camera work was perfect. Because a lot of the choreography in 'Mr. Chu' has Apink putting their hands near their face, close up shots are necessary to show the entirety of the choreography well. The camera work on Inkigayo did the close-up better than the other two shows. Plus, Apink's live performance was especially strong on this stage."

On April 16, Apink decided to halt promotional activities and cancel all their schedules including their third anniversary fanmeeting on April 19 to pay respect for the victims of Sewol Tragedy. A Cube Entertainment released a statement, "Due to the magnitude of the passenger ship sinking, Apink felt too much pain and did not think they could sing for their fans with a light heart, which is how this decision came to be made. We plan on having the canceled fan meeting some other time in the future and will later announce the new date and location." The group resumed promotions after 3 weeks, performing at Mnet's M! Countdown on May 8. They wrapped up promotions for Pink Blossom on May 25.

For the single's promotion in Japan, the group launched album release events in Tokyo, Fukuoka, Osaka and Nagoya. The release events, which took place in the forms of fan meetings successfully sold out all seats and gathered around 9,300 people.

== Critical reception ==
One music representative stated, "Sexy girl groups poured out in January and February and came out with similar sexy concepts that can get tiring. But Apink used the idea of purity and brightness for their music, which is appealing to the listeners." While Jeff Benjamin reviewed, "Continuing Apink's slew of bubblegum-pop singles, "Mr. Chu" doesn't necessarily push Apink into new or unexplored territory. Rather, "Mr. Chu" seems to be a way to try to further solidify themselves as K-pop's ultimate sweethearts."

One of the reasons behind the group's decision to continue with its bright and innocent concept instead of following the trend of sexy concept was their fans. During an interview, Apink said, “The first teaser we released was the album cover photo. We were wearing red lipstick in the photo and so many fans were worried that we might change our concept from before.” This decision had positive responses from public and fans as "Mr. Chu" topped various music sites’ real-time charts as soon as it was released.

== Accolades ==
On April 8, 2014, "Mr.Chu" won first place on the MBC Music music show, Show Champion. It was Apink's second win on the show after "NoNoNo" in 2013. On April 9, "Mr. Chu" won first place on the Mnet's M! Countdown, It was Apink's second win after "My My" in 2012 and on the next day, the song won another first-place trophy on KBS's Music Bank K-Chart, Apink's second win on the show after "NoNoNo" in 2013. On April 11–12, Apink ended the week with full sweep of the week's music shows with their first trophies from MBC's Show! Music Core and SBS's Inkigayo. The song got its second first-place trophy from M! Countdown after the show returned to broadcast after a three-week-long hiatus on May 8, making a total of six trophies for "Mr. Chu". In November 2014, Apink received "Best Female Dance" for "Mr. Chu" at the Melon Music Awards.

Awards and nominations
Year	Organization	Award	Result	Ref.
2014	Melon Music Awards	Best Female Dance	Won	
2014	Melon Music Awards	Best Music Video	Nominated	
2015	Gaon Chart Music Awards	Song of the Year (April)	Nominated	
2015	Golden Disc Awards	Digital Song Bonsang	Nominated	
2015	Seoul Music Awards	Bonsang	Won	

Music program awards
Program	Date
Show Champion	April 9, 2014
M! Countdown	April 10, 2014
M! Countdown	May 8, 2014
Music Bank	April 11, 2014
Show! Music Core	April 12, 2014
Inkigayo	April 13, 2014

== Commercial performance ==
"Mr. Chu" entered the Gaon Digital Chart at number 2 in the first week of its release and the song became the eighth best selling digital song in 2014 on Gaon's year-end chart. The song peaked at number 2 on Billboard's K-pop Hot 100. In Japan, the single debuted at number three on Oricon’s daily album chart and climbing up to second place on the next day ranked behind "SMAP" the nation Japanese Boygroup. They ranked second on Oricon single weekly chart, sold 54,161 copies on the first week. They broke their own record since their Japanese Single Debut, "No No No" only managed to peak at number 3 at the Oricon weekly chart last November. "Mr. Chu" entered at number 89 on the Billboard Japan Hot 100 on the first week and climbing up to no. 5 for the week after.

== Track listing ==
Japanese version
No.	Title	Lyrics	Music	Length
1.	"Mr. Chu (On Stage)" (Japanese version)	Shoko Fujibayashi	Duble Sidekick, David Kim
2.	"Hush" (Japanese version)	HASEGAWA	HyuWoo, Rado
3.	"Mr. Chu (On Stage)" (Instrumental)		Duble Sidekick, David Kim
4.	"Hush" (Instrumental)		HyuWoo, Rado

== Charts ==
=== Weekly charts ===
Chart (2014)	Peak position
South Korea (Gaon)	2
South Korea (K-pop Hot 100)	2

Chart (2015)	Peak position
Japanese Singles (Oricon)	2
Japan Hot 100 (Billboard)	5

=== Year-end charts ===
Chart (2014)	Position
South Korea (Gaon)	8

== Credits and personnel ==
- Apink – vocals
- Duble Sidekick – producer, songwriter, arranger
- David Kim – lyricist
- SEION – composer
- Glory Face – arranger, producer
