= No No No (Apink song) =

"NoNoNo"
- Japanese cover

Single by Apink

from the album Secret Garden and Pink Season
- B-side: "My My" (JP ver.)
- Released: July 5, 2013 (KR); October 22, 2014 (JP)
- Genre: Pop; dance-pop; electropop
- Length: 3:40
- Label: A Cube; CJ E&M; Universal Music Japan
- Songwriters: Shinsadong Tiger; Rado; PA-NON
- Producer: Shinsadong Tiger

Apink singles chronology
"Bubibu" (2012)	"NoNoNo" (2013)	"Good Morning Baby" (2014)
"Luv" (2014)	""NoNoNo" (ノーノーノー)" (2014)	""Mr. Chu" (ミスター・チュウ)" (2015)

Music video
- "NoNoNo" on YouTube "NoNoNo"(Japanese Version) on YouTube

"No No No" is a song by South Korean girl group Apink. It was released on July 5, 2013 with their third EP, Secret Garden, and is composed by Shinsadong Tiger and Kupa. It had been 14 months since their last album Une Année was released, and it was the first time the group promoted with six members after Hong Yookyung left the group in April. "No No No" was the group's highest charting single, peaking at number 2 on the Billboard K-pop Hot 100. A Japanese version of the song was released on October 22, 2014, with lyrics by Japanese lyricist PA-NON.

== Background and release ==
On July 3, 2013, it was stated that the title track of Secret Garden was to be named "No No No" in a preview of their upcoming music video for their song. "No No No" highlighted Apink's clean and pure image, a healing song that will appeal across all ages and genders. Instead of going with the trend of sexy concepts, Apink stuck with their "bright and innocent" concept that reminds people of 90's old-school girl groups. Chris Choi from MTV commented "With all the ultra sexy releases we’ve been getting this summer, “No No No" feels like a breath of fresh air."

=== Japanese version ===
On August 4, Apink held their first Japanese showcase at Siganawa Stellar Ball in Tokyo in front of music industry figures, reporters and around 2,000 chosen fans. At this event, Apink announced they would make their official debut in Japan on October 22 with a Japanese version of "No No No". On October 22, Universal Music Japan released "No No No" as a CD single with "My My" as a B-side. Instrumental versions of both songs were also included. The Japanese lyrics were written by Japanese lyricist "PA-NON" who had previously written lyrics for South Korean groups such as Kara and 2 pm. Since the Japanese fans loved the original "No No No" lyrics, the group decided to have the Japanese lyrics be similar to the original lyrics. The Japanese lyrics for "My My" were written by Japanese lyricist MEG.ME who had previously written lyrics for T-ara and B1A4.

== Composition and lyrics ==
“No No No" was written by Shinsadong Tiger, who had previously worked with the group for "My My" and "Wishlist", and it was also co-composed by Kupa. The song blends the sound of funky guitar rhythm and string melodies that are perfect for the Spring season. In addition, lyrics in the chorus, "Don't be sad no no no, You're not alone no no no", are accompanied by an addictive melody. Jeff Benjamin of Billboard put the song in the bubblegum pop genre, and noted its "unexpected, but much welcomed, funky dance sections".

"No No No" is intended to be a "healing song". The lyrics were written with the thought of giving strength and courage for people who listen to it and to give a positive message to the important person in their life. The lyric are not only intended for lovers but also for family and friends. In an interview with Excite, Hayoung said, "This is a song that can give strength to various people, be it family, lovers or friends. I think it has a healing effect when you're feeling tired. Each and every word of the lyrics has deep meaning. As the way you think of the song will change depending on when you listen to it, when you're a little tired the song might have a sad feel, also if you listen to it at other times it might provide encouragement. There are lyrics have phrases like 'I will absolutely not leave you even if everyone is leaving', and I think it has very good meaning."

== Music video ==
On July 5, 2013, the original version of the music video was released simultaneously on both A Cube's and CJ E&M's YouTube channel. It was directed by Hong Won-ki of ZanyBros. The music video has a colorful set, and the Apink members can be seen playing together with cupcakes, balloons and flowers in a birthday party. The members can also be seen dancing a cute dance with a lot of hip shaking.

On July 11 a dance version music video was released. In this video, the full choreography for the song is shown, and there are no individual close-up shots or special effects. The dance choreography for "No No No" is not hard and can be easily imitated by anyone. The key point of the dance is during the chorus where the members can be seen putting their hands on their waists and twisting left and right.

== Promotion and live performances ==
On July 4, 2013, one day before the song's release, Apink performed the song for the first time on Mnet's M! Countdown. This was followed by additional comebacks on music programs including KBS's Music Bank, MBC's Show! Music Core and SBS's Inkigayo. On September 28, 2013, Apink were models for the fashion event, Girls Award 2013, in Japan. "No No No" played in the background as they walked along the runway. On October 7, Apink performed the song at the 2013 Hallyu Dream Concert Special in front of 14,000 people, including 3,000 K-pop fans from overseas. On October 20, Apink visited Taiwan and held their first fanmeeting with around 1,500 fans. At the show, they performed "No No No" along with their other hits. A week later, Apink attended Korea Festival 2013 in Singapore, a festival that promotes Korean culture. Apink held a showcase where they performed "No No No" among others songs.

== Commercial performance ==
The song debuted at number 14 on South Korea's Gaon Singles Chart and peaked at number 3 the week after. On Billboard's K-pop Hot 100, "No No No" debuted at no 7 and became Apink's first top 10 single. It peaked at number 2 on the third week, becoming the group's highest charting single. On the year-end charts, "No No No" placed at number 12 on the K-pop Hot 100, and number 33 on Gaon's digital chart. It was the most streamed song of 2013 in South Korea.

== Accolades ==
On July 17, 2013, Apink won their first music show award for "No No No" on Show Champion. On July 19, "No No No" won first place on Music Bank; this was Apink's first music show win on public broadcast TV. In January 2014, "No No No" received a "Digital Bonsang Award" at the 23rd Seoul Music Awards and 29th Golden Disk Awards

Awards and nominations
Year	Organization	Award	Result	Ref.
2014	Golden Disc Awards	Digital Song Bonsang	Won	
2014	Golden Disc Awards	Digital Daesang	Nominated	
2014	Seoul Music Awards	Bonsang	Won	

Music program awards
Program	Date	Ref.
Show Champion	July 17, 2013	
Music Bank	July 19, 2013	

== Charts ==
=== Weekly charts ===
Chart (2013–14)	Peak position
Japan Singles (Oricon)	4
South Korea (Gaon)	3
South Korea (K-pop Hot 100)	2

=== Yearly charts ===
Chart (2013)	Position
South Korea (Gaon)	33
South Korea (K-pop Hot 100)	12

== Track listing ==
Japanese single
No.	Title	Lyrics	Music	Length
1.	"NoNoNo" (Japanese version)	PA-NON	Shinsadong Tiger, Kupa	3:39
2.	"My My" (Japanese version)	MEG.ME	Rado, Shisadong Tiger	3:54
3.	"NoNoNo" (Instrumental)		Shisadong Tiger, Kupa	3:39
4.	"My My" (Instrumental)		Rado, Shisadong Tiger	3:54
Total length:				15.06

"CD+DVD A" DVD Tracklist
No.	Title	Length
1.	"NoNoNo" (Music video – Dance version)

"CD+DVD B" DVD Tracklist
No.	Title	Length
1.	"NoNoNo" (Music Video)

== Credits and personnel ==
- Apink – vocals
- Shinsadong Tiger – producing, songwriting, arranger, music
- Kupa – songwriting and music
- Rado – songwriting and music
- PA-NON – songwriting (Japanese lyrics)
- MEG.ME – songwriting (Japanese lyrics)
