= Secret Garden (Apink EP) =

EP by Apink
- Released: July 5, 2013
- Recorded: 2012–2013
- Genre: K-pop; dance-pop
- Label: A Cube Entertainment; CJ E&M Music and Live

Apink chronology
Une Année (2012)	Secret Garden (2013)	Pink Blossom (2014)

Singles from Secret Garden
- 1. "No No No" Released: July 5, 2013

Secret Garden is the third EP by South Korean girl group Apink, released on July 5, 2013. This is their first official release as six-member group, without their former member Hong Yoo-kyung who dismissed the group due to education conflict schedules since returned after 14 months since they last promoted their last album "Une Année" with "Hush" and "Bubibu" in May 2012. They made first comeback stage on Mnet’s “M! Countdown" one day before the official release. The theme of the album is healing, aim to that will soothe the listeners’ eyes and ears. The album consist of five new songs including the title track "No No No" produced by Shinsadong Tiger.

== Release and promotion ==
On June 23, A Cube Entertainment announced that Apink will return with a new mini album "Secret Garden" through a video teaser released on their YouTube channel. The teaser showed six girls, confirming Apink will continue as six without adding new member after Yookyung left the group in April in wish to consider to focus on her studies in university. "Secret Garden" will be their first official release as six-member group and their returned after 14 months since they last promoted their last album "Une Année" with "Hush" and "Bubibu" in May 2012.

On June 28, a second video teaser was released, showing the girls each holding a bouquet of flowers in a green meadow. The teaser revealed the date of upcoming album release will be on July 5. It was later revealed that the background music used for the video teasers were snippets of two of the tracks on their up-coming mini-album, titled "Secret Garden" and "U You".

On July 3, it was stated that the group's title track will be "No No No", a song composed by Shinsadong Tiger and the full music video will be released together with the album release on July 5. In a preview of their upcoming music video of the song, Apink members can be seen dancing and singing a small part of their song.

One day before the music video and mini-album was released, Apink performed a snippet of "Lovely Day", a track on their album, in addition to a full performance of "No No No" on Mnet's M! Countdown on July 4. This was followed by additional comebacks on music programs including KBS's Music Bank, MBC's Show! Music Core and SBS's Inkigayo. On July 9, Apink's "No No No" won 1st place on Music Bank. On July 5, they released the physical mini album, digital single and the music video for "No No No".

== Concept ==
In regards to the theme of their album, A Cube Entertainment stated "The theme of the Secret Garden album is healing, and more than anything shocking, it’ll be an album that will make you feel refreshed. You can anticipate Apink’s improved skills that improved over the year of preparation." They added, "With the meaning of “Apink’s Establishment”, this album “Secret Garden” will not be a transformation, but it will be an album filled with an innocent music genre, perfect for the girls, that will soothe the listeners’ eyes and ears."

On July 10, Apink members sent healing messages for their fans. In the picture uploaded by A Cube, each of Apink member can be seen holding a personally decorated for their fans. their healing song "No No No" revealed each of their own healing messages through their agency.The members wrote messages such as Naeun brightened up their day by telling fans to "Cheer UP!" Chorong assured, "Everything will be okay~ Pat Pat." Namjoo gave encouraging advice with the message: "Always Smile." Bomi suggested a "Positive mindset." Eunji let fans know, "I'm by your side. I love you," and Hayoung declared, "I will be your light."

=== Stage Outfit ===
For "Secret Garden" promotion, Apink incorporated 2013 summer fashion trend for their stage outfit. The aim is to achieve a girlish and feminine look that matched with the album concept and summer season. Some of fashion concept such as “Stripe & Lace”, a combination of Black & White striped pattern pants with lace and sporty baseball uniform for the top to finish a girlish look; “Pastel color”, warm and bright pastel color outfit that perfect for summer season;“Flower pattern & Crop”, a trendy crop top with flower pattern that will give a feminine look.

=== Album cover and artwork ===
Apink released album jacket photos teaser through Naver Music online on June 27 through Naver Music Online, revealed both group and individual close up shots as they posed in a green field. On July 2, album cover for Secret Garden was released showing Apink member setting up a lemonade stand for the summer and showed off their innocent and pure image.

Member Naeun had personally designed the album cover of Apink’s new 3rd mini album Secret Garden. After the album release, many fans asked if member Naeun participated in the album cover design after seeing the name Son Naeun credited for ‘Art Work & Design’. On July 11, A Cube replied, “The Son Naeun listed on the credits is indeed the same Son Naeun from Apink. She draws really well, so we suggested that she could design the album cover this time. She personally agreed to it in a positive light and went ahead with it. Everyone will be able to find for themselves the art work that Son Naeun did within the album.”

== Songs and music video ==
=== No No No ===
The song was written and produced by Shinsadong Tiger and the music video was created by ZanyBros. Shinsadong Tiger previously worked with Apink for "My My" and "Wishlist". There are two version for the song music video, the full version released on July 5, while the dance choreography version on July 11. "No No No" was the group's highest charting single, peaking at number 2 on 'Billboard's K-Pop Hot 100 and number 3 on Gaon Single Chart. On the year-end charts, "No No No" placed at number 12 on the K-Pop Hot 100, and number 33 on Gaon's digital chart. A Japanese version of the song was released on October 22, 2014.

=== Secret Garden ===
"Secret Garden" composed by ZigZag Note is a pop ballad song with a medium tempo that showcases Apink member's vocals. The lyrics portrayed emotion of a girl who finally ready to open her heart to someone she love. On July 20, the group released the music video for their song, which was also created by ZanyBros.

=== U You ===
Music video for "U You" first revealed exclusively for the fans during Apink’s first fan meeting on August 31. It was later officially released on September 3 at their YouTube channel. Using the similar set with title song "No No No", the video showed Apink members having fun playing together.

== Track listing ==
No.	Title	Lyrics	Music	Length
1.	"U You"	Golden Doohyun	Golden Doohyun, Playing Child, Oh Hyunho	3:25
2.	"No No No"	Shinsadong Tiger, Kupa	Shinsadong Tiger, Kupa	3:40
3.	"Lovely Day"	Golden Doohyun	Golden Doohyun, Playing Child, Oh Hyunho	3:00
4.	"I Need You" (난 니가 필요해; Nan Niga Pilyohae)	D'Day, KZ	KZ, Mr. Gomdol	3:49
5.	"Secret Garden"	Lee Chan Mi	ZIGZAG NOTE	4:03
6.	"No No No (Instrumental)"		Shinsadong Tiger, Kupa	3:40
Total length:				21:40

=== Taiwan Version ===
CD
No.	Title	Length
1.	"U You"	3:25
2.	"No No No"	3:40
3.	"Lovely Day"	3:00
4.	"I Need You" (난 니가 필요해; Nan Niga Pilyohae)	3:49
5.	"Secret Garden"	4:03
6.	"No No No (Instrumental)"	3:40
7.	"Hush"	3:30
8.	"My My"	3:56
9.	"It Girl"	3:23
10.	"Wishlist"	3:33
11.	"I Don't Know" (몰라요; Mollayo)	3:42

DVD (MV List)
No.	Title	Length
1.	"No No No"	3:45
2.	"U You"	3:26
3.	"Secret Garden"	4:06
4.	"Hush"	3:30
5.	"My My"	4:14
6.	"It Girl"	3:30
7.	"Wishlist"	3:35
8.	"I Don't Know" (몰라요; Mollayo)	3:53

== Charts ==
Chart	Peak position
Gaon Weekly album chart	2
Gaon Monthly album chart	7
Gaon Yearly album chart	41 (2013)
Gaon Yearly album chart	88 (2014)

=== Sales and certifications ===
Provider (2013)	Amount
Gaon physical sales	69,893+
Oricon physical sales	3,480+
Taiwan 5music physical sales	1,000+

== Release history ==
Country	Date	Format	Label
South Korea	July 5, 2013	CD, Digital download	A Cube Entertainment; CJ E&M Music and Live
Taiwan	November 22, 2013	CD	Universal Music Taiwan; A Cube Entertainment
