= Une Année =

- Physical cover. The digital cover has red border.

Studio album by Apink
- Released: May 9, 2012; April 29, 2016 (re-issue)
- Recorded: 2012 at Cube Studio, Seoul, South Korea
- Genres: K-pop; dance-pop
- Labels: A Cube Entertainment; CJ E&M Music (Distributor); LOEN Entertainment (Re-issue)

Apink chronology
Snow Pink (2011)	Une Année (2012)	Secret Garden (2013)

Singles from Une Année
- 1. "April 19th" Released: April 19, 2012; 2. "Hush" Released: May 9, 2012; 3. "Bubibu" Released: July 6, 2012

Une Année is the first full-length studio album by South Korean girl group Apink. It was released on May 9, 2012, and would mark the final release for member Yookyung before her departure from the group due to scheduling conflicts and continuing with her studies in college. The title track, "Hush", was used to promote the album.

== Background and composition ==
Two of the songs from the album, "I Got You" and "Sky High", were a collaboration with Joker. The group also worked with Shinsadong Tiger, Super Changddai, and Kim Geonwoo.

== Singles ==
The first single from the album, "April 19th", was released digitally on April 19, 2012.

The album's title track, "Hush", was released on May 9, 2012. The song's music video was released on May 8, and a dance practice music video was released on May 14. A Japanese version of "Hush" was later included as a B-side on Apink's Japanese single, "Mr. Chu". The promotions for "Hush" started on May 10, 2012, on Mnet's M! Countdown.

The third single, "Bubibu", was released digitally on July 6, 2012. The single was chosen through an online poll that the group ran through Mnet's website where they asked fans to choose the track for their follow-up promotions. The single version is a remix of the album version. The fourth single, "Cat", was released three days after the third single "Bubibu".

== Track listing ==
Digital download
No.	Title	Lyrics	Music	Length
1.	"Une Année (Intro)"	Bumi, Nyangi	Bumi, Nyangi	0:57
2.	"Hush"	Rado, Hyuwoo	Rado, Hyuwoo	3:30
3.	"Cat" (고양이; Goyangi)	MayBee	Kim Gunwoo (a.k.a. Secret K)	3:33
4.	"April 19th" (4월 19일; lit. "April 19")	Chorong	Kim Jin Hwan	4:19
5.	"Bubibu"	Golden Doohyun, Playing Child	Golden Doohyun, Playing Child, Shim Man Joo	3:40
6.	"Step"	Hyuwoo	Shinsadong Tiger, Hyuwoo	3:38
7.	"Boy"	Super Changddai	Super Changddai	3:04
8.	"I Got You"	Shinsadong Tiger, Yong Jun-hyung, Kim Tae Joo	Shinsadong Tiger, Yong Jun-hyung, Kim Tae Joo	3:19
9.	"Sky High" (하늘 높이; Haneul Nopi) (featuring Yong Jun-hyung)	Super Changddai	Super Changddai	3:21
Total length:				29:15

== Charts ==
Chart	Peak position
Gaon album chart	4

=== Sales and certifications ===
Provider (2012–2014)	Amount
Gaon physical sales	40,510+
