= Snow Pink =

2011 EP by Apink

- Digital cover. The physical cover has portrait shape.

EP by Apink
- Released: November 21, 2011
- Recorded: Cube Studio, Seoul, South Korea; 2011
- Genres: K-pop, dance-pop, electro hop
- Length: 17:03
- Labels: A Cube Entertainment; CJ E&M Music and Live

Apink chronology
Seven Springs of Apink (2011)	Snow Pink (2011)	Une Année (2012)

Singles from Snow Pink
- 1. "My My" Released: November 21, 2011

Snow Pink is the second extended play by South Korean girl group Apink. It was released on November 21, 2011, with the lead single "My My" used to promote the EP.

== Background and release ==
Snow Pink was released three months after Apink's debut EP, Seven Springs of Apink. The main producers for the album were Shinsadong Tiger, Super Changttai and Rado.

== Singles ==
The lead single from the album was "My My" which was composed by Shinsadong Tiger and Rado. Promotions for the song began on November 25, on KBS' Music Bank. The song peaked at number 16 on Gaon's digital chart and Billboard's K-Pop Hot 100. A Japanese version of the song was later included on the group's Japanese single, "NoNoNo", released October 22, 2014.

== Track listing ==
No.	Title	Lyrics	Music	Length
1.	"He's My Baby"	Hyu Woo	Hyu Woo	3:10
2.	"My My"	Rado, Shinsadong Tiger	Rado, Shinsadong Tiger	3:56
3.	"Yeah"	Shinsadong Tiger	Choi Kyusung, Shinsadong Tiger	3:13
4.	"Like a Dream" (꿈결처럼; Kkumgyeolcheoreom)	Hyu Woo	Hyu Woo	3:34
5.	"Prince"	Super Changddai	Super Changddai	3:49
Total length:				17:03

== Charts ==
Chart	Peak position
Gaon album chart	7

=== Sales and certifications ===
Provider (2011+2015)	Amount
Gaon physical sales	25,701+
