= Seven Springs of Apink =

EP by Apink
- Released: April 19, 2011
- Recorded: Cube Studio, Seoul, South Korea; 2011
- Genre: K-pop, dance-pop
- Length: 15:30
- Label: A Cube Entertainment; CJ E&M Music and Live

Apink chronology
Seven Springs of Apink (2011)	Snow Pink (2011)

Singles from Seven Springs of Apink
- 1. "I Don't Know" Released: April 19, 2011; 2. "Wishlist" Released: May 20, 2011; 3. "It Girl" Released: June 23, 2011

Seven Springs of Apink is the debut extended play by the girl group Apink. It was released on April 19, 2011. The songs "I Don't Know" and "It Girl" were used to promote the EP.

== Release ==
Promotions for "I Don't Know" began on April 21, 2011, on M! Countdown.

== Track listing ==
No.	Title	Lyrics	Music	Length
1.	"Seven Springs of Apink"	G.NA	Super Changddai, Bae Youngho	1:33
2.	"I Don't Know" (몰라요; Mollayo)	Super Changddai	Super Changddai	3:42
3.	"It Girl"	Kim Gunwoo	Kim Gunwoo, Songgihong in BlueBridge	3:23
4.	"Wishlist"	Shinsadong Tiger	Shinsadong Tiger	3:33
5.	"Boo"	Super Changddai	Super Changddai	3:08
Total length:				15:30

== Charts ==
Chart	Peak position
Gaon album chart	6

== Sales and certifications ==
Provider (2011+2015)	Amount
Gaon physical sales	16,365+
