= Apink =

South Korean girl group

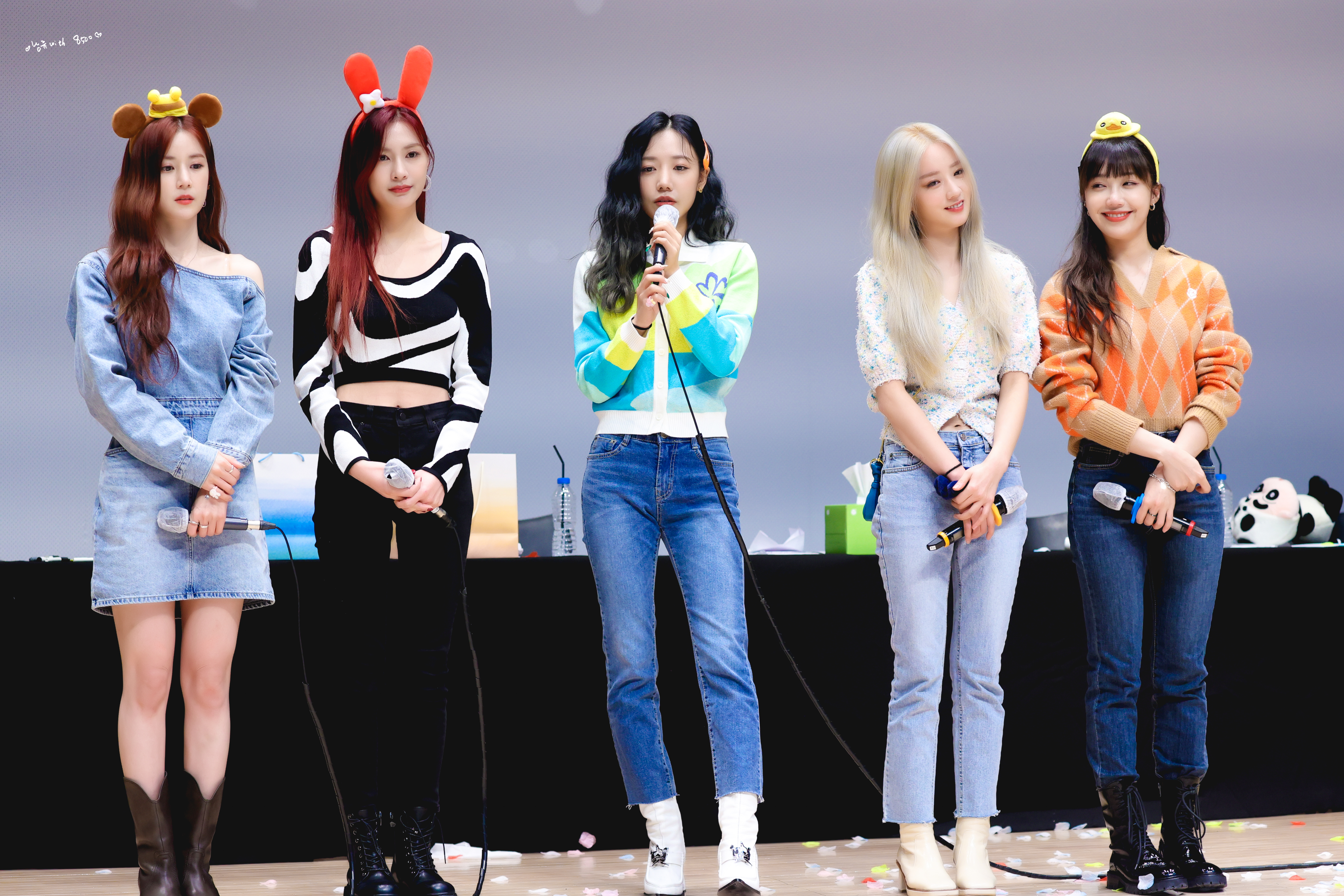
- Apink in April 2022 (L–R: Chorong, Hayoung, Namjoo, Bomi, Eunji)

Background information
- Origin: Seoul, South Korea
- Genres: K-pop; bubblegum pop; synthpop
- Years active: 2011–present
- Labels: IST; Universal; Choi Creative Lab; With Us
- Spinoffs: Apink BnN; Apink Chobom
- Members: Chorong; Bomi; Eunji; Namjoo; Hayoung
- Past members: Yookyung; Naeun
- Website: Apink (in Korean)

Apink (Korean: 에이핑크; Japanese: エーピンク) is a South Korean girl group formed in 2011, currently consists of five members: Chorong, Bomi, Eunji, Namjoo, and Hayoung. Apink was originally a septet; Yookyung left in 2013 to pursue her education and Naeun left to pursue her acting career in 2022.

The group debuted on April 19, 2011, with the extended play (EP) Seven Springs of Apink. Since their debut, Apink has won awards at shows such as the Golden Disc Awards, the Seoul Music Awards and the Mnet Asian Music Awards. Their first music program win was on M Countdown on January 5, 2012, for "My My" from their second EP Snow Pink. To date, Apink has released nine Korean EPs, five Korean studio albums, and three Japanese studio albums.

== History ==
=== Pre-debut ===
In February 2011, A Cube Entertainment (formerly Play M Entertainment and Plan A Entertainment) announced the first trainee for new girl group Apink was Son Na-eun, who featured in Beast's "Soom" (숨; "Breath"), "Beautiful" and "Niga Jeil Joha" (니가 제일 좋아; "I Like You the Best") music videos in late 2010. Park Cho-rong, who appeared at the end of Beast's "Shock" Japanese music video, joined next, as the group's leader. A Cube announced Oh Ha-young as the third member. In March, Jung Eun-ji was introduced as the fourth member on A Cube's Twitter account through a video of her singing a rendition of Jennifer Hudson's "Love You I Do". Hong Yoo-kyung was similarly announced through an online video where she was playing the piano. The last two members, Yoon Bo-mi and Kim Nam-joo, were introduced through the group's reality show, Apink News.

Prior to the group's debut, the documentary Apink News aired on the Korean cable channel Trend E. The show chronicled the launch process of Apink. The episodes were hosted by various celebrities, including G.NA, Mario, MBLAQ's Seung Ho and G.O, Beast, 4Minute, 2AM's Jinwoon, and Secret's Sunhwa and Hyoseong. The week before Apink's official debut, they released their first television commercial for Ceylon Tea.

=== 2011: Debut, rising success and further releases ===
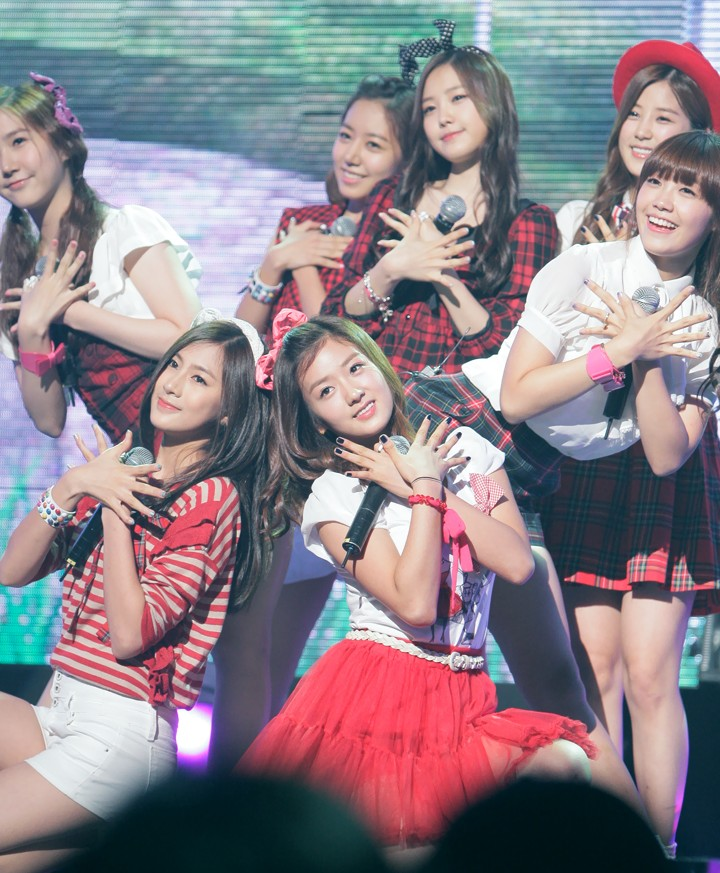
A Pink at the GSL Season 5 Code S Final Performance, 2011

The group released their debut EP, Seven Springs of Apink, and the music video for its lead single, "Mollayo" (몰라요; "I Don't Know"), on April 19, 2011. The album consists of five songs, including "It Girl" and "Wishlist". The music video for "Mollayo" featured Beast's Lee Gi-kwang. Apink made their debut stage performance with "Mollayo" on Mnet's M Countdown on April 21 to promote their album. After several months of promoting "Mollayo", they began promoting "It Girl". Apink also recorded the song "Uri Geunyang Saranghage Haejuseyo" (우리 그냥 사랑하게 해주세요; "Please Let Us Love") for the SBS drama, Protect the Boss, the soundtrack of which was released in September 2011. In November, Apink began recording a reality television show called Birth of a Family with boy band Infinite. The show followed the efforts of the two idol groups to care for abandoned and mistreated animals over the course of eight weeks. The group released their second EP, Snow Pink, on November 22, 2011, featuring the lead single "My My", a song composed by Shinsadong Tiger. Promotions for "My My" began on November 25 on KBS' Music Bank. The promotions for "My My" included a one-day idol tea café, serving fans to raise profits for charity, where the group members prepared the food and drinks themselves. The members also auctioned off personal items for charity. In November, Apink received their first award, the Female Rookie Award, at the 2011 Mnet Asian Music Awards held in Singapore. In December, Apink and Beast released a music video of the song "Skinny Baby" for the school uniform brand Skoolooks. In January 2012, they received three more Rookie Awards, at the Korean Culture & Entertainment Awards, the Golden Disk Awards held in Osaka, and the High 1 Seoul Music Awards in Seoul.

=== 2012–2013: First studio album, Yookyung's departure and commercial success ===
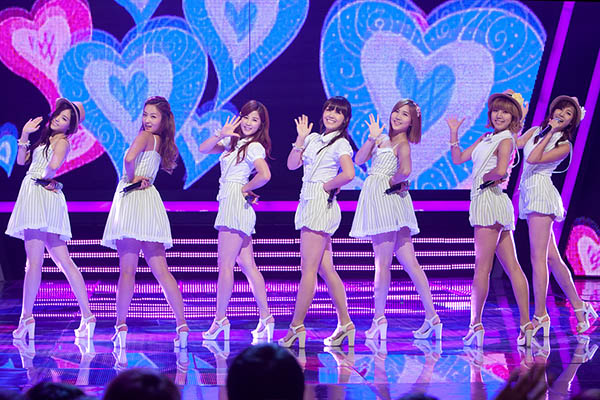
Apink performed "Bubibu" at Mnet M Countdown Smile Thailand Southeast Asia, 2012.

In January 2012, Apink won their first music show award on Mnet's M Countdown for "My My". In February, they received the Rookie of the Year award at the 1st Gaon Chart Awards. The group performed at the Canadian Music Fest in March 2012. Apink News was continued for three seasons. For season 3, which began to air in June 2012, Apink members contributed as writers, camera operators, directors, and in other production jobs. The group next released the eponymous "April 19" (4월 19일) to celebrate their first anniversary. The song was composed by Kim Jin-hwan, with lyrics by the group's leader, Park Cho-rong. The song was included on their first studio album, Une Année, which was released on May 9, 2012. The group began promotion of the album with weekly appearances on music programs to perform the title song "Hush" through June. They continued to promote the album in July with the release of their third single from the album, "Bubibu". The single was chosen by fans through a poll on Mnet's website.

In January 2013, Apink recorded another single with Beast to promote Skoolooks. On January 5, at the AIA K-POP 2013 concert in Hong Kong, the group performed several of their songs along with other Cube Entertainment groups 4Minute and Beast. In April 2013, Play M Entertainment released the statement that Yookyung left the group due to her educational pursuits and Apink will continue as a six-piece group without adding new members. The group's third EP, Secret Garden, and music for its title track, "NoNoNo", were released on July 5. "NoNoNo" was the group's highest-charting single, peaking at number two on Billboard's K-Pop Hot 100. In November 2013, at the 2013 Mnet Asian Music Awards, Apink received the Next Generation Global Star award. In December, Apink collaborated with Cube Entertainment acts Beast, 4Minute, BTOB, G.NA, Roh Ji-hoon, Shin Ji-hoon and Kim Kiri to release "Christmas Song". In the same month, they recorded a collaboration single with B.A.P, titled "Mini", for Skoolooks. In July, Apink were selected as honorary ambassadors for the Seoul Character & Licensing Fair 2013.

=== 2014–2016: Rise in popularity and Japanese debut ===
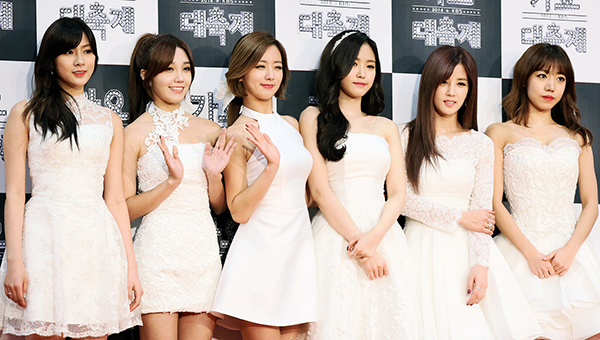
Apink at the 2014 KBS Song Festival red carpet

On January 13, 2014, Apink released "Good Morning Baby", a song composed by Duble Sidekick, to celebrate the 1,000th day since the group's debut. The song peaked at number six on Gaon's weekly chart. Their fourth EP, Pink Blossom, and the music video for its title track, "Mr. Chu", by Duble Sidekick, were released on March 31. The song peaked at number two on Billboard's K-Pop Hot 100. Apink won six music show trophies for "Mr. Chu", and the song was the eighth best selling digital song in 2014, according to Gaon's year-end chart. In June, Bomi and Namjoo formed a sub-unit called Apink BnN, which released the single "My Darling" for Brave Brothers' 10th Anniversary Project. "My Darling" was later included on Pink Luv, Apink's fifth EP. The single "Break Up to Make Up" for the project A Cube for Season #Sky Blue, featuring Eunji and label mate Huh Gak, was released on July 8, ranking first on Gaon's weekly digital chart. In August, Apink was chosen to replace Beast on MBC Every1's reality show, Showtime. Apink's Showtime first aired on August 7, 2014, and there were a total of eight episodes. The show followed Apink's daily activities. Apink debuted in Japan with a showcase on August 4 in Tokyo and on September 15 in Osaka with 6,000 fans in attendance. Their first Japanese-language single, "NoNoNo", also including a Japanese version of "My My", was released on October 22. The single was number four on Oricon's weekly singles chart. More than 20,000 fans reportedly gathered for their debut events held in three Japanese cities. From September to November, Apink raised funds for the Seungil Hope Foundation to build a hospital for ALS patients. In November, Apink's online fan club surpassed 100,000 members. On November 13, Apink received the Best Female Dance award at the 2014 Melon Music Awards for their video of "Mr. Chu". In November, the group released their fifth EP, Pink Luv, as well as the music video for its title song, "Luv", which was composed by Shinsadong Tiger. The song was Apink's first number one ranking on Gaon's weekly and monthly digital charts, and Pink Luv topped Gaon's weekly album chart in its first week of release. Apink first performed "Luv" live at a showcase on November 20, followed by a performance at Music Bank the next day, prior to the album's release. The group won first place on all three major Korean music shows two weeks in a row, the only girl group to do so in 2014. Besides The Show and Show! Music Core, they also won a triple crown on Inkigayo, which only allows three wins before removing a song from competition. They finished the year by winning all the music shows in December with "Luv". On Gaon's year-end ranking, Apink was the third best selling girl group in 2014.

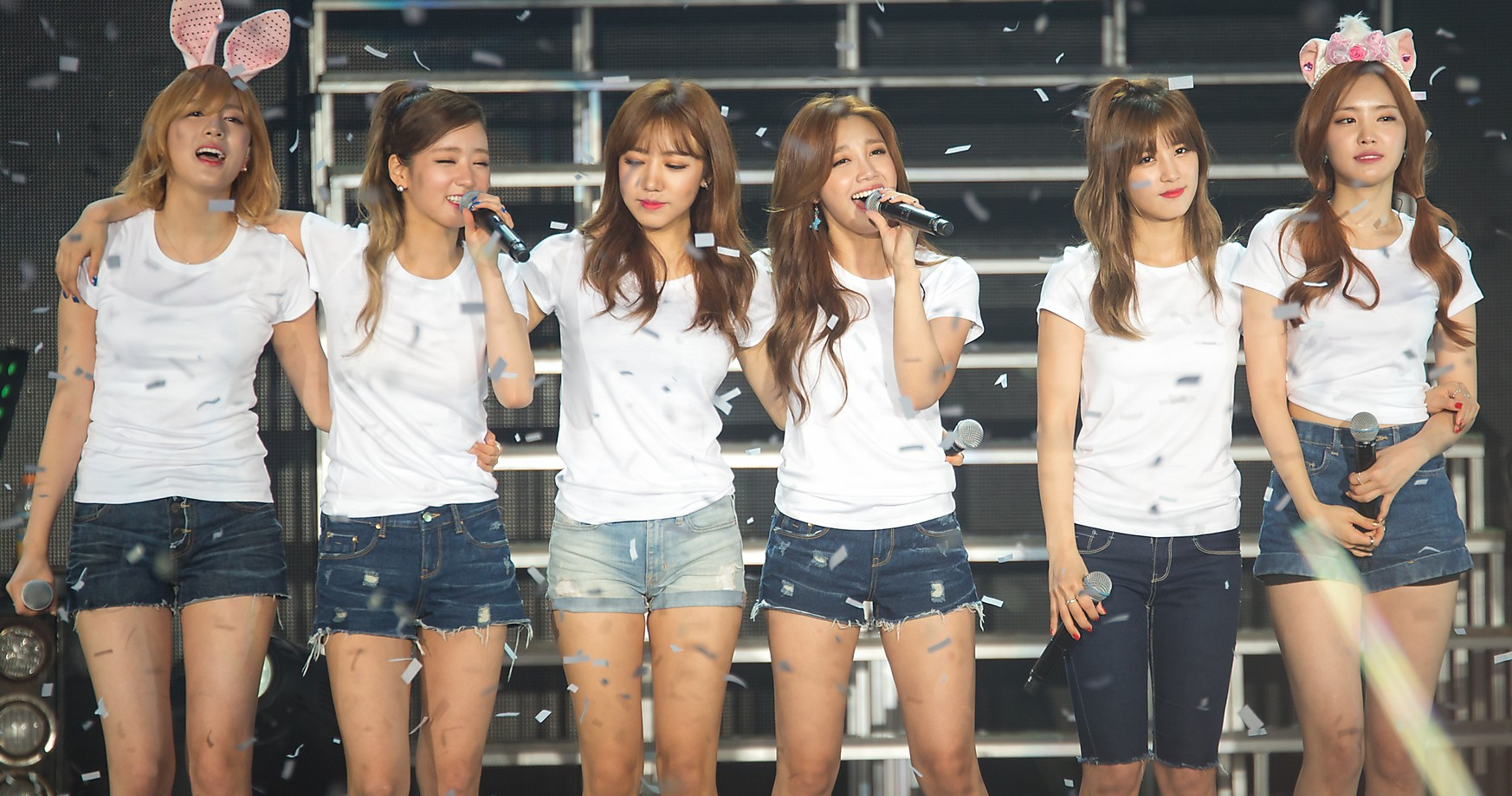
Apink during Pink Paradise in Shanghai

On January 10, 2015, Apink became the first group to win five consecutive awards on Music Core. The same month, the group received the Digital Bonsang and Best Female Performance Group awards at the 29th Golden Disk Awards in Beijing, Bonsang and Popularity awards at the Seoul Music Awards, Best Female Group at the Korean Culture and Entertainment Awards and Best Single of December at the Gaon Chart K-Pop Awards. Their first headlining concert, billed as Pink Paradise, was held in Olympic Hall, Olympic Park, on January 30 and 31. The 7,200 concert tickets sold out within two minutes after going on sale. Apink released a Japanese version of "Mr. Chu" on February 18, 2015, which also included a Japanese version of "Hush". It reached number two on Oricon's weekly singles chart, selling 54,000 copies the first week of its release. In February, Apink entered Forbes Korea Power Celebrity for the first time at number 18. That same month, the group was chosen as one of the Best 3 New Artists (Asia) at the Japan Gold Disc Awards, held by the Recording Industry Association of Japan. Apink headlined their first overseas concert Pink Paradise in Singapore at The MAX Pavilion on March 22. They appeared at the Korean Times Music Festival in Los Angeles in May, Music Bank event in Hanoi, Vietnam, and performed Pink Paradise in Shanghai. Apink released a single entitled "Promise U" on April 19, written by Jeong Eun-ji to commemorate the group's fourth anniversary. A Japanese version of "Luv" was released on May 20 as their third single, with "Good Morning Baby" as the B-side. They performed the song for the first time at the "Girls Award 2015 Spring/Summer" in Tokyo on April 29 ahead of the release. The group also held release events in four cities, Tokyo, Sapporo, Okayama and Osaka as part of promotional event. On July 16, the group released their second full-length album, Pink Memory, along with the title track "Remember". On August 22 and 23, the group held their second concert Pink Island at Jamsil Indoor Stadium, after which they began overseas activities including a fan meeting in Thailand, held their first concert tour in Japan, and a performance at MTV World Stage in Malaysia 2015. On August 26 the group released their first Japanese full-length album Pink Season. In November, Apink announced their first tour in North America and were scheduled to perform in Vancouver, Dallas, San Francisco and Los Angeles. The group's fourth Japanese single "Sunday Monday" was released on December 9, along with the Japanese version of "Petal" as B-side track. At the end of 2015, Apink received a Top 10 award at the Melon Music Awards. The group closed the year as the second best-selling girl group of 2015 with sales of both Pink Luv and Pink Memory albums.

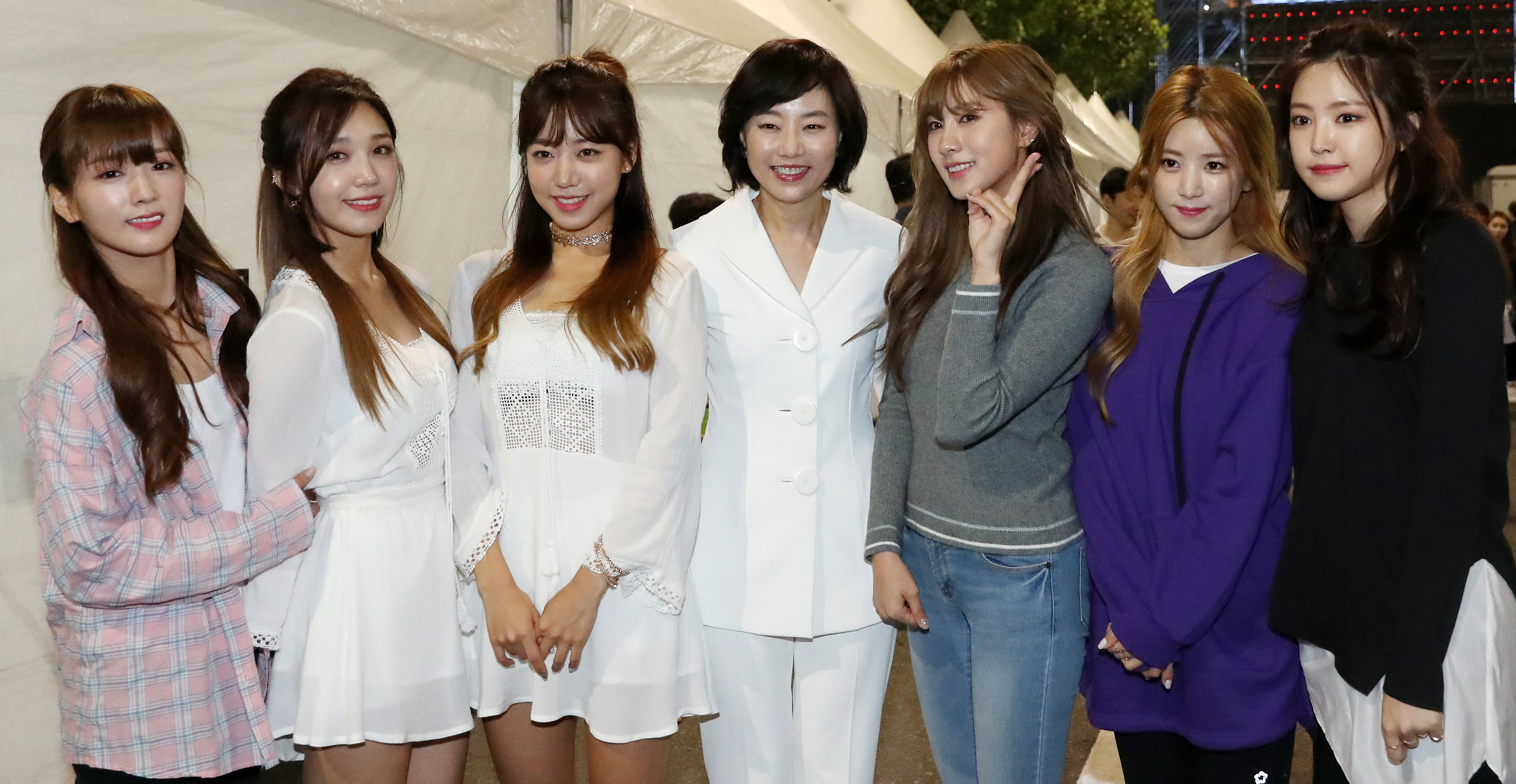
Apink at Korea Sale Festa Opening Ceremony, September 30, 2016

Apink started their North American tour on January 5, 2016, in Vancouver, followed by shows in Dallas, San Francisco and Los Angeles. The same month, they were awarded a Bonsang at the Seoul Music Awards and Disk Bonsang at the Golden Disk Awards. On January 24, the group was invited to attend KKBOX Music Awards in Taiwan. On February 25, the group released the music video to their first original Japanese song called "Brand New Days". The song is the opening theme song for the anime Rilu Rilu Fairilu ~Yousei No Door~. The group performed at the 10th Asian Film Awards on March 17. On April 2, the group performed a mini concert Pink Memory Day in Singapore. On April 19, Apink released a digital single entitled "The Wave", written by Park Cho-rong to celebrate their 5th anniversary along with a photobook called Girls' Sweet Repose. Apink performed alongside international acts OneRepublic, Far East Movement, Bebe Rexha and Filipino artists Gary Valenciano, his son Gabriel, James Reid and Nadine Lustre for MTV Music Evolution in Manila on June 24. Apink held their second Japan concert tour in July, kicking off in Sapporo on July 7. They performed in front of 20,000 fans throughout six concerts in five cities and released their sixth Japanese single, "Summer Time!", on August 3. To promote the song, Apink held release events in seven different cities, from August 1 to 7, starting in Fukuoka, followed by events in Hiroshima, Nagoya, Osaka, Kobe, Tokyo and Niigata. Apink released their third full-length Korean album, Pink Revolution, on September 26, following a hiatus of one year and two months, the group's longest since debut. The title track, "Only One" (내가 설렐 수 있게), was used to promote the album along with B-tracks "Boom Pow Love" and "Ding Dong". On the same day, they held a showcase which was broadcast live through V Live. Apink worked with Black Eyed Pilseung for the title track, as well as well-known producers such as Shinsadong Tiger and Dsign Music for the B-sides. "Only One" topped seven music charts in Korea just a few hours after it was released. During the showcase, leader Cho-rong stated that Pink Revolution would incorporate a new sense of Apink's growth and maturity since debut, while Eun-ji explained that Apink will begin to focus on making complex and beautiful music, rather than tracks that "are simply fun and catchy." Apink promoted "Only One" and Pink Revolution for nearly a month, and the album has since sold 50,000+ copies in South Korea. In November, Apink began their Pink Aurora Asia Tour, performing at numerous destinations throughout eastern Asia including Taiwan and Singapore. Plan A Entertainment also announced Apink's third Korean concert Pink Party, which took place in Seoul on December 17 and 18. After this announcement, tickets sold out in just over two minutes. Also during this time, Apink returned to Japan to promote their upcoming second Japanese album, Pink Doll, which was set to be released in Japan on December 21. On November 30, Plan A Entertainment announced that Apink would be returning on December 15 with their first special album, Dear, despite rigorous activities and promotions throughout the end of 2016. Plan A stated that the album would commend the unwavering love and invaluable support from their fans since debut. Dear has five new original songs, three of which are duets sung and written exclusively by pairs of members. A music video for the album's title track, "Cause You're My Star," was uploaded on YouTube by 1theK and Apink's official channel. The album also included instrumentals and ballad versions of Apink's previous hits including "Mr. Chu", "NoNoNo", "Luv", and "April 19".

=== 2017–2020: International recognition and reinvention ===
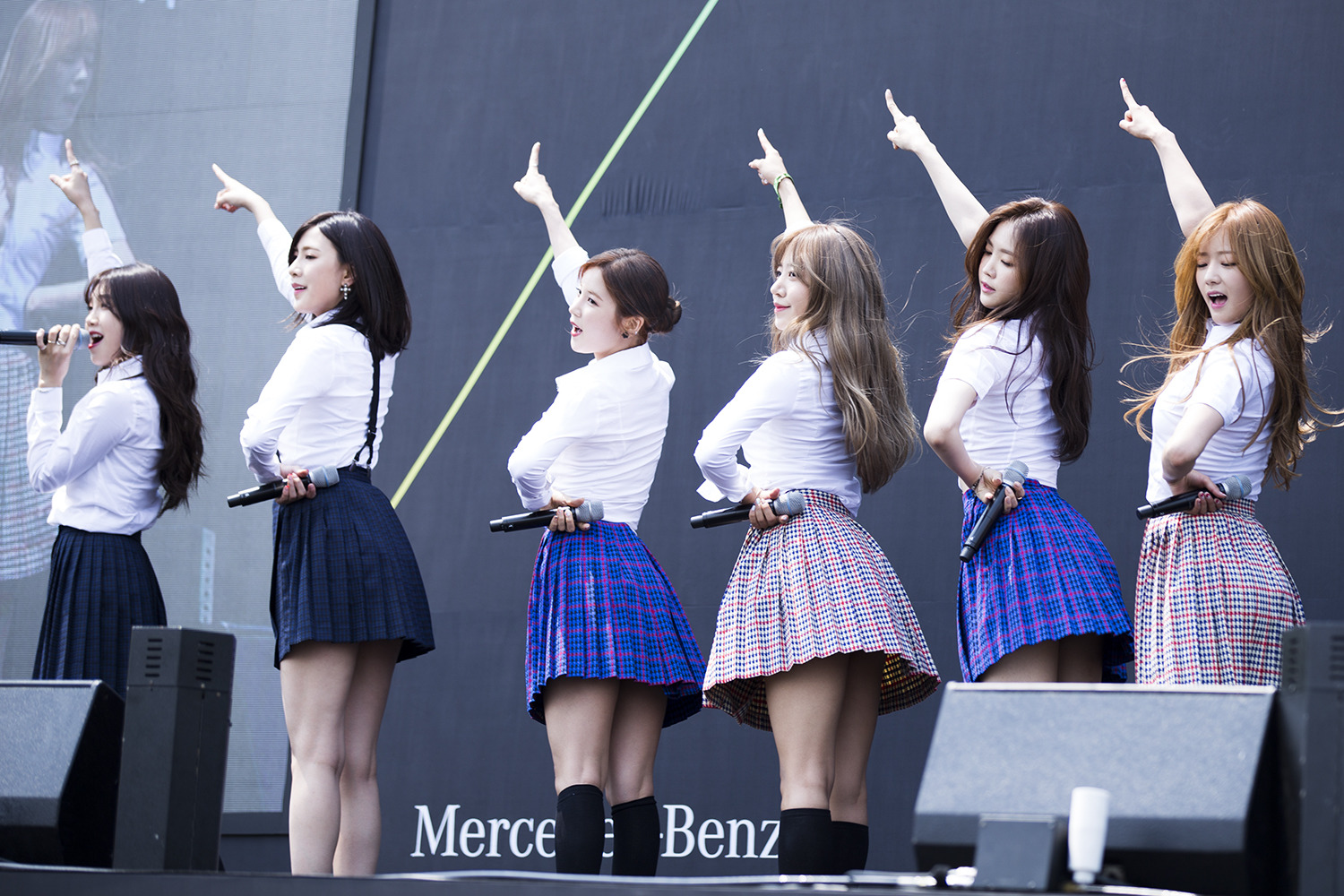
Apink performs at the Mercedes Benz Donatic & Race Event in May 2017

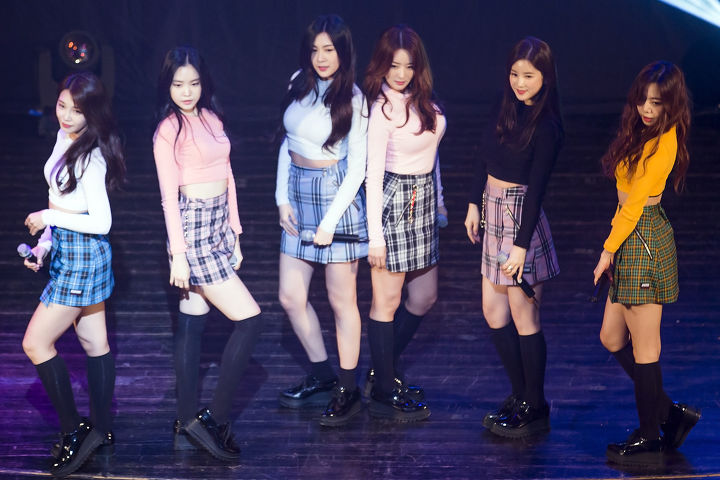
Apink in March 2018

On March 21, Apink released their seventh Japanese single, "Bye Bye". On April 19, Apink released another fan song, "Always". On June 26, Pink Up was released, along with the single "Five", written by Shinsadong Tiger. In its first week of release, Pink Up topped the Gaon Album Chart, the first since Pink Luv. "Five" peaked at number 4 on the digital chart. Apink released their eighth Japanese single "Motto Go!Go!" on July 25 and promoted the song by holding their third Japanese tour, 3 Years - performing in Kobe on the 22nd, Nagoya on the 26th, and Yokohama on July 30. As a collaboration with labelmates Huh Gak and Victon, Apink released "Oasis" on August 3, a remake of the 2007 Brown Eyed Girls song. Starting in August, Apink began their Pink Up Asia Tour, performing in Hong Kong, Bangkok and Taipei. In October, Apink returned to Japan to promote their ninth Japanese single, "Orion", and later that month also announced the closing of their Japanese fan club 'Panda Japan'. At the Asia Artist Awards on November 15, Apink won the Best Celebrity Award. Apink held their fourth Korean concert Pink Space in Seoul on January 12 and 13. The concert, which was announced in December, had sold out tickets three minutes after its announcement. In celebration of their seventh anniversary, Apink released single "Miracle" and a photobook on April 19, followed by a fan meeting held on April 21. On July 2, Apink released their seventh mini-album One & Six. The title track, "I'm So Sick" (Korean: 1도 없어), was used to promote the album along with B-track "Alright". Once again, Apink worked with frequent collaborator Black Eyed Pilseung for the title track, who had previously produced "Only One". With this comeback, Apink took on a different direction conceptually, with a bolder image and a more sophisticated sound. "I'm So Sick" topped several music charts in South Korea after its release. The album itself topped the Gaon chart and led Apink to reach their highest-ever position on Billboard's World Albums chart at number 11. The success of the song and album further led to Apink making their debut on Billboard's Social 50 chart, opening at number 39. Billboard chose the title track as one of the 20 Best K-Pop Songs of 2018, noting that "it felt a bit meta -- as the six-member girl group swapped out their girlish image for something far more compelling.". In August, Apink embarked on another Asia tour, visiting Hong Kong, Kuala Lumpur, Jakarta, Singapore, Tokyo and Taipei. On December 1, Apink received the Top 10 Artists award at the 2018 Melon Music Awards for their song "I'm So Sick".

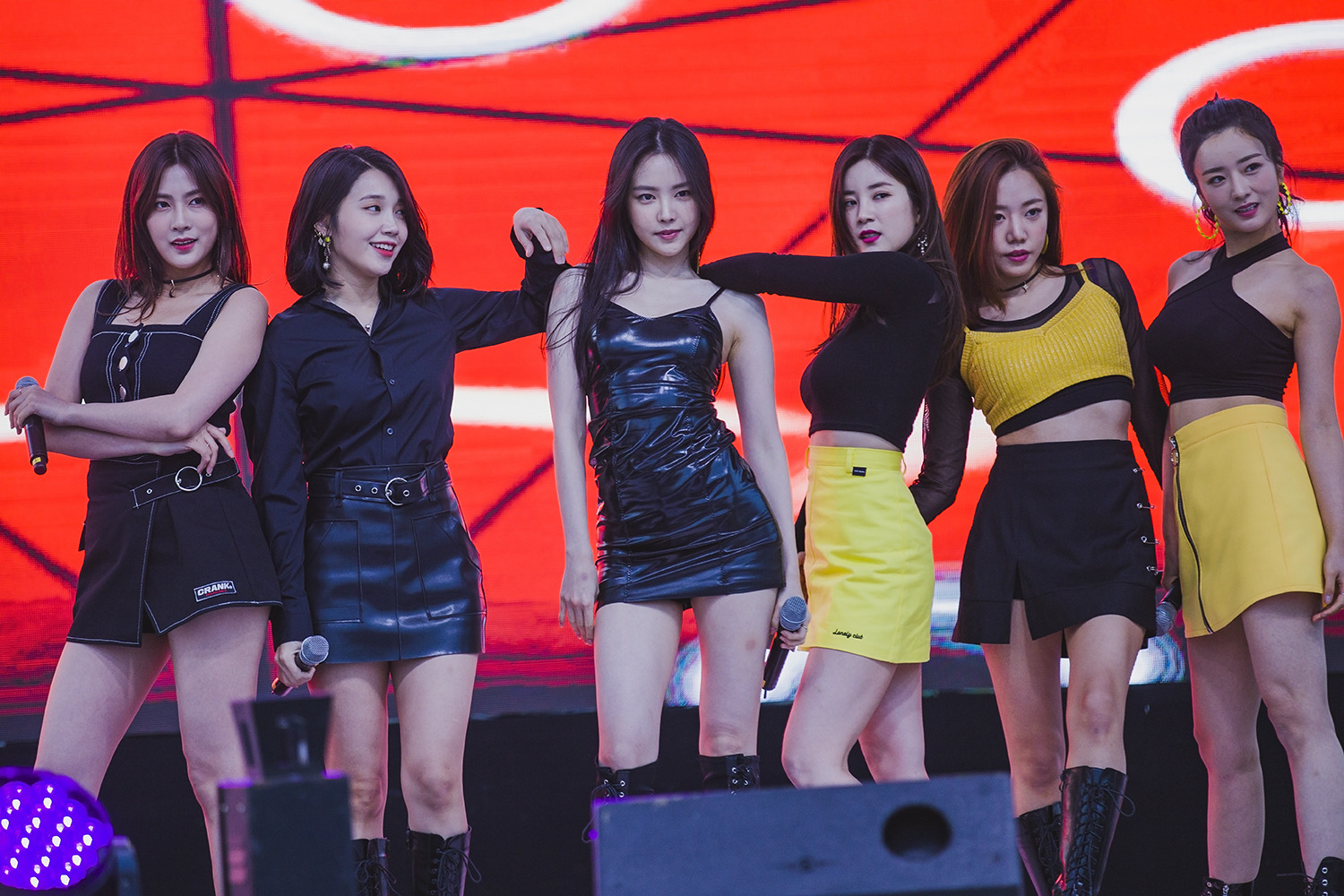
Apink in June 2019

Apink held their fifth Korean concert Pink Collection: Red and White in Seoul on January 5 and 6. The concert, which was announced in December, sold out all tickets three minutes after its announcement. This was followed by concert Apink Japan Live Pink Collection in Tokyo, held on February 2 and 3. On January 7, Apink released their eighth mini-album Percent, along with the single "%%(Eung Eung)", composed by frequent collaborator Black Eyed Pilseung and Jeon Goon. The single, which continued the new direction taken by the group with "I'm So Sick", topped several music charts in South Korea after its release and peaked at number 17 on the Gaon digital chart, while the album reached number three on the Korean chart and number 14 on the Billboard World Albums chart. To promote the new album, Apink performed "%%(Eung Eung)" on various music shows, along with B-side track "Hug Me", for a period of two weeks beginning on January 9. To celebrate their 8th anniversary, Apink released the digital single "Everybody Ready?" dedicated to fans on April 19.

On March 13, 2020, Play M Entertainment announced that Apink would be making a comeback some time in April. On April 13, Apink released their ninth mini-album Look, as well as the single, "Dumhdurum". "Dumhdurum" was composed and written by Black Eyed Pilseung and Jeon Goon, who worked on their previous songs "I'm So Sick" and "%%(Eung Eung)". Upon release, the song topped four major realtime charts in South Korea and became their first song to reach number one on Melon in 5 years, since "Remember". To promote the new album, Apink performed "Dumhdurum" on various music shows, along with B-side tracks "Be Myself", "Love is Blind" and "Moment" for a period of two weeks beginning on April 17. "Look" debuted at number two on the Gaon Album Chart while "Dumhdurum" peaked at number two on the Digital Chart, giving the group their ninth top 10 single. "Dumhdurum" was also ranked second on Billboard's list of the top K-pop songs of 2020.

=== 2021–2024: 10th anniversary, Naeun's departure, new sub-unit and contract renewals ===
To celebrate their 10th anniversary, Apink released the new digital single "Thank You" on April 19, 2021. On April 29, 2021, Play M Entertainment announced that member Naeun decided to not renew her contract with the company, while the other five members renewed with the agency. Despite the change of agency, the company assured fans that Apink would remain a six-member group. In December, IST Entertainment announced that Apink would make their comeback in February 2022. On February 14, 2022, Apink released their fourth studio album Horn, as well as the lead single "Dilemma".

On April 8, 2022, it was reported that Naeun would be withdrawing from the group due to difficulty balancing work as both an actress and idol. This was later confirmed by IST Entertainment via the group's fancafe. On April 19, Apink released a new digital single titled "I Want You To Be Happy" to celebrate their 11th anniversary. In June, IST Entertainment announced that Chorong and Bomi will be forming Apink's new sub-unit called "ChoBom", and will be releasing their first single album Copycat on July 12.

On March 14, 2023, confirmed the release of Apink's 10th mini album SELF, which was released on April 5. On April 28, IST Entertainment announced that all the members, except Eunji, did not renew their contracts with the company but team activities will be maintained. On that same day, it was also announced that Chorong, Bomi, Namjoo and Hayoung signed with Choi Creative Lab. On December 11, 2023, the group released christmas carol song "Pink Christmas".

Apink held their seventh concert "Pink Christmas" at the KBS Arena in Gangseo-gu, Seoul on December 21 and 22, 2024.The group's performance at the 2025 Taipei New Year's Eve Party on December 31.

=== 2025–present: New management ===
On April 19, 2025, Apink released digital single "Tap Clap" to commemorate the group's 14th anniversary.

In July 2025, Chorong, Bomi, Namjoo, and Hayoung signed With Us Entertainment and the group's future activities will also managed by the agency. In November 2025, it was announced that the group's new album will release sometime in January 2026 to celebrate their 15th anniversary debut. In December 2025, it was revealed to be their 11th EP Re: Love, which was released on January 5, 2026.

== Image and musical style ==
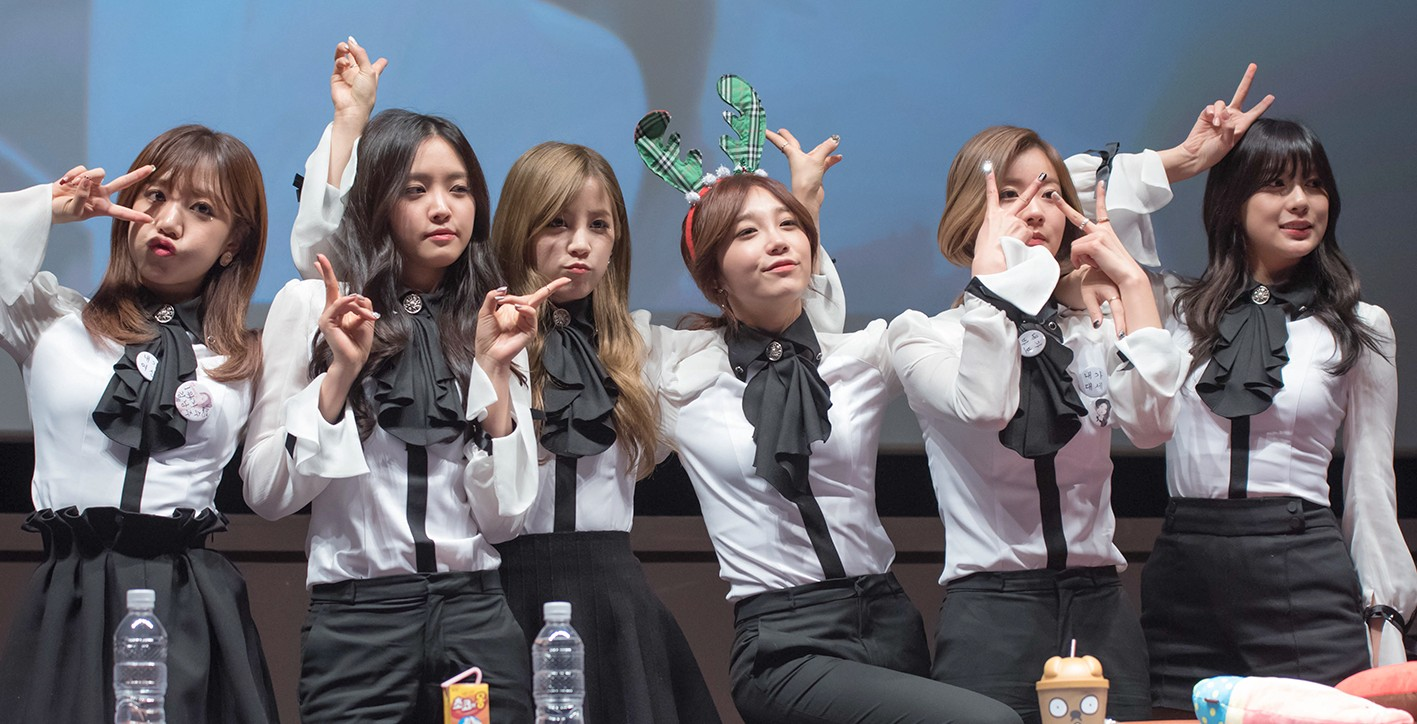
Apink at a fan event, 2014

Apink's image and music style are often compared to first-generation idol girl groups S.E.S. and Fin.K.L. Apink has an innocent and girlish image, unusual among girl groups' sexy concepts. In 2012, youngest member Hayoung stated, "Other girl groups these days tend to highlight their dancing skills and sexy looks, but our concept was an innocent and pure image. I think that's why the audience felt comfortable with us". However, releases like 2014's "Luv" and 2015's "Remember" showed a more mature and sensitive side to the group while still retaining their trademark innocence.

Apink's music generally fits within the bubblegum pop genre, with signature cheery lyrics. Jeff Benjamin of Billboard commented that "My My" recalled early 2000s bubblegum pop, "NoNoNo" was influenced by 1980s synth-pop and "Luv" recalls 1990s hip-hop while blending it with ballad melancholy, a fall-themed song of lost love. "Mr. Chu", released in spring 2014, continues Apink's trademark bubblegum series which is 'very Apink'. Meanwhile, title track "Remember" is a 'cheery synth-pop tune that reminisces about a love during the summertime,' and 'features a quick rhythm and vintage sound to beat the summer heat'. Their 2016 title track, "Only One" is described as mature, blending in mid tempo R&B and dance-pop with subtle hip-hop beats while song like "Boom Pow Love" shows a far more urban-pop, energetic vibe with pulsing beats compared to their previous hits.

With the release of 2018's "I'm So Sick", Apink showed a shift in their style of music, moving towards a more mature and sophisticated sound. The track, with its use of autotune, synth and house beats, and its lyrical content of having 'not even one' bit of feeling left for an ex, makes "I'm So Sick" a much bolder track than what Apink is known to put out. 2019's "%%(Eung Eung)" does much of the same. Its use of 'fizzy synths, snapping beats, and slapping percussion as the members sing about the type of person one should love' makes "%%(Eung Eung)" another song that is a departure from much of Apink's earlier work.

== Members ==
Adapted from their Naver profile:

=== Current ===
- Park Cho-rong (박초롱)
- Yoon Bo-mi (윤보미)
- Jung Eun-ji (정은지)
- Kim Nam-joo (김남주)
- Oh Ha-young (오하영)

=== Former ===
- Hong Yoo-kyung (홍유경)
- Son Na-eun (손나은)

== Ambassadorship ==
- 2021 COEX Food Week Ambassador (2021)

== Discography ==
Korean albums

- Une Année (2012)
- Pink Memory (2015)
- Pink Revolution (2016)
- Horn (2022)

Japanese albums

- Pink Season (2015)
- Pink Doll (2016)
- Pink Stories (2017)

== Concerts and tours ==
Korean Tours

- Pink Paradise (2015)
- Pink Island (2015)
- Pink Party (2016)
- Pink Space (2018)
- Pink Collection: Red and White (2019)
- Welcome to Pink World (2020)
- Pink Eve: 10 Years (2021)
- Pink Christmas (2024)

Japan Tours

- Apink 1st Live Tour – Pink Season (2015)
- Apink 2nd Live Tour – Pink Summer (2016)
- Apink 3rd Live Tour – 3 Years (2017)
- Apink Japan Live Pink Collection (2019)

Asia Tours

- Apink Secret Garden in Singapore – Vizit Korea (2013)
- Pink Paradise Asia Tour (2015)
- Apink Pink Memory Day In Singapore Mini Concert & Fan Meeting (2016)
- Pink Aurora Asia Tour (2016–2017)
- Pink Up Asia Tour (2017)
- One & Six Asia Tour (2018)
- Pink Drive (2023)
- Pink New Year (2025)
- The Origin : Apink (2026)

American Tours

- Pink Memory: Apink North America Tour (2016)

Online Stage

- Pink of the Year (2020)

== Filmography ==
Apink started with a documentary program titled Apink News, which aired on the cable channel TrendE for three seasons (2011–2012). They appeared in another reality show, Birth of a Family, from 2011 to 2012. In 2014, Apink appeared on another reality show, MBC Every 1's Showtime, and were the subject of the third season.

=== Reality shows ===
Year	Title	Note
2011–2012	Apink News	
2011–2012	Birth of Family	With Infinite
2013–present	Apink Diary	
2014	Apink's Showtime	
2016	Extreme Adventures	
2017	Finding X-PINK	
2017–2018	Put Your Hands Up	
2019	Everybody Ready	
2020	Idol Tour	
2022	Apinkation	
2025	This Member? Remember!	

== Awards and nominations ==
The group has won awards at shows such as the 26th Golden Disc Awards, 21st Seoul Music Awards, and 13th Mnet Asian Music Awards. Their first music program win was on M Countdown on January 5, 2012, for "My My" from their second EP Snow Pink.
