= Park Cho-rong =

South Korean singer and actress (born 1991)

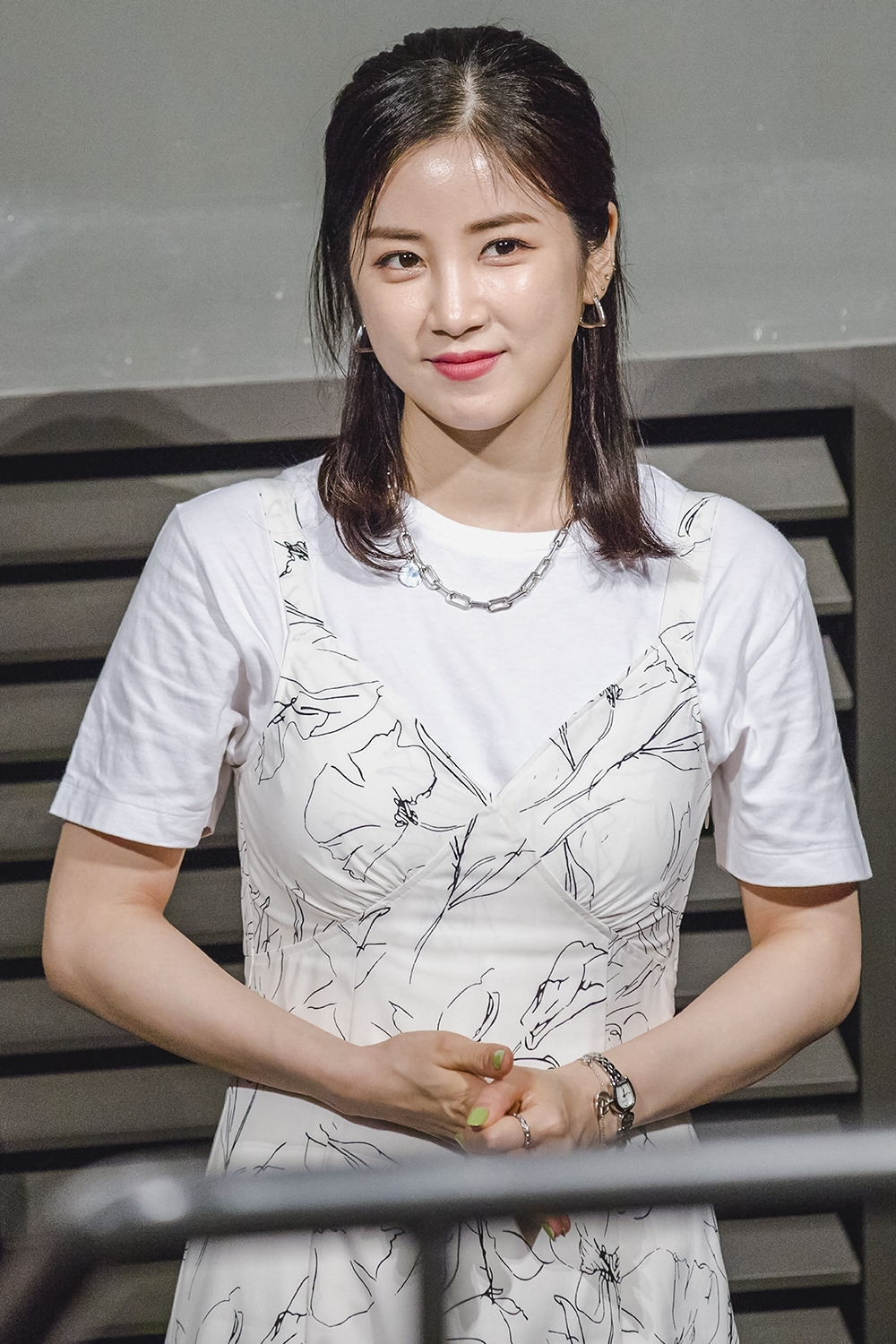
- Park in July 2020
- Born: March 3, 1991 (age 35); Cheongju, South Korea
- Occupations: Singer; songwriter; actress
- Musical career
- Genre: K-pop
- Instrument: Vocals
- Years active: 2011–present
- Labels: IST; Choi Creative Lab; With Us Entertainment
- Member of: Apink

Korean name
- Hangul: 박초롱
- RR: Bak Chorong
- MR: Pak Ch'orong

Park Cho-rong (Korean: 박초롱; born March 3, 1991), better known mononymously as Chorong, is a South Korean singer, songwriter and actress. She is best known as the leader of the South Korean girl group Apink.

== Early life ==
Park Cho-rong was born in Cheongju, South Korea on March 3, 1991. She is a middle child, having an older and a younger sister. As a daughter of a Hapkido master and academy owner, Park was trained in the said martial art for eight years. She trained from her first year in elementary school until her third year of junior high; she holds a third degree black belt. During her school days, Park attended Byungsul Kindergarten, Bukang Elementary School, Bukang Middle High School, and Choongbook High School.

Park auditioned for JYP Entertainment's fifth official audition in 2009 where she successfully made it to the final round. However, she was eventually eliminated, and afterwards, joined Cube Entertainment as a trainee before transferring to A Cube Entertainment, formerly an independent label under Cube Entertainment now known as IST Entertainment.

== Career ==
=== 2011–present: Apink ===
In February 2011, Park was announced as the second member and leader of Apink. Prior to the announcement, she appeared at the end of Beast's "Shock" Japanese version music video. Before her debut with Apink, Park, together with the rest of the Apink members, took part in the filming of Apink News which was the group's pre-debut reality show. On April 19, 2011, Apink released its first single "Mollayo" and on April 21, Park debuted as a member of Apink on Mnet's M! Countdown performing their songs "Mollayo", and "Wishlist" which were included on their debut EP Seven Springs of Apink.

On April 28, 2023, IST Entertainment announced that Park did not renew her contract with the company but will still be part of the group. On the same day, Park signed an exclusive contract with Choi Creative Lab.

On July 2, 2024, Park released her first digital single "모르시나요".

=== 2011–present: Acting career ===
Park started her acting career by appearing on the 2010 sitcom All My Love playing a character named Chorong, following the departure of Brown Eyed Girls' Gain. She then made a cameo appearance on Reply 1997 as the teenage version of Lee Il-Hwa, the mother of the lead role Sung Shi-won (played by Jung Eun-ji) along with her fellow Apink member Yoon Bo-mi. Park had her first leading role in the romantic comedy Plus Nine Boys as Han Soo-ah, a popular but mysterious high-school girl; a character opposite to BtoB's Yook Sungjae's character. In 2017, she starred on Naver TV Cast's web drama Special Law of Romance alongside Kim Min-kyu and VIXX's Hyuk.

== Discography ==
=== Singles ===
List of singles, with showing year released, selected chart positions and album name
Title	Year	Peak chart positions	Album
"모르시나요"	2024	TBA	Non-album single

== Videography ==
=== Music videos ===
Title	Year	Director(s)	Ref.
"모르시나요"	2024	SNP Film	

== Filmography ==
=== Film ===
Year	Title	Role	Notes	Ref.
2020	Road Family	Yuri	Main role	

=== Television series ===
Year	Title	Role	Notes	Ref.
2010	All My Love for You	Cho-rong	Cameo (Episode 125–210)	
2012	Reply 1997	Lee Il-hwa (young)	Cameo (Episode 9)	
2014	Plus Nine Boys	Han Soo-ah / Bong-sook		
2018	A Poem a Day	Kang Mi-ae	Cameo	

=== Web series ===
Year	Title	Role	Notes	Ref.
2017	Special Law of Romance	Seo Ji-hye		
2022	I Want to Hurt	Shin Ha-yeon	Audio drama	

=== Television shows ===
Year	Title	Role	Notes	Ref.
2017	One Night Food Trip	Cast member	Season 2	
2019	Trend With Me	Host	Season 2	
2021	Style Me	Host		
2022	Style Me	Host	Season 3	

=== Web shows ===
Year	Title	Role	Ref.
2016	Extreme Adventures	Host	
2017	Finding X-PINK	Host	
2017–2018	Put Your Hands Up	Host	
2019	Everybody Ready	Host	
