= List of songs recorded by STAYC =

Songs recorded by STAYC

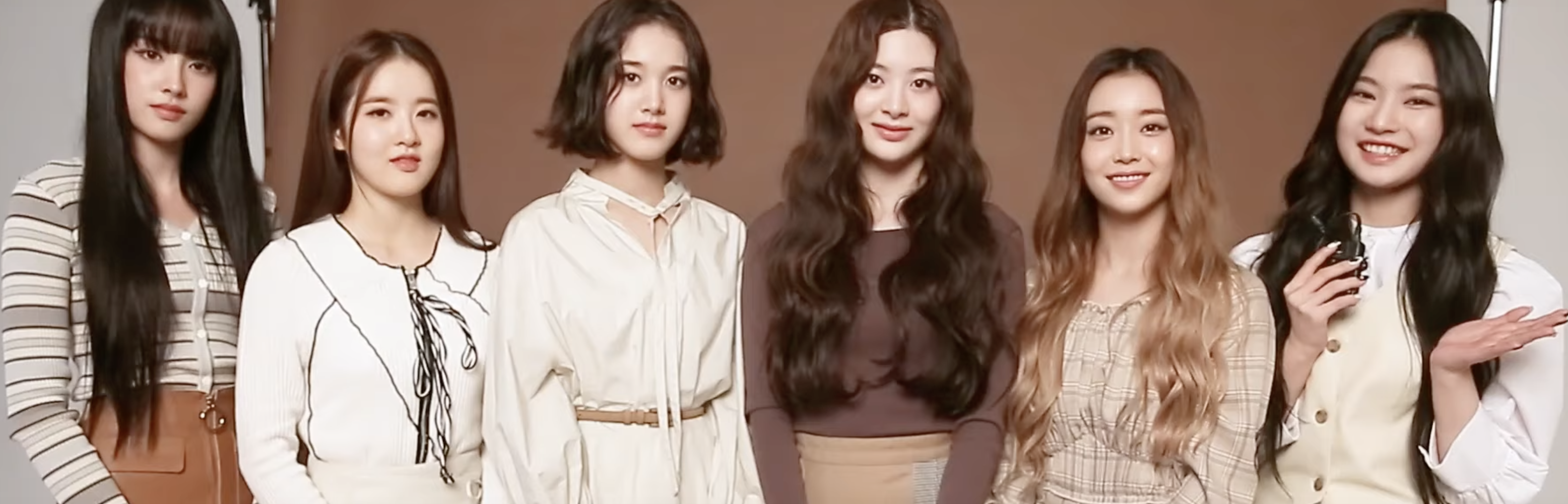
STAYC in November, 2020

The following is a list of songs recorded by South Korean girl group STAYC.

Key
†	Indicates a single release
‡	Song available in Korean and Japanese

== Recorded songs ==
List of songs, showing year released, writers name, and originating album
Song	Year	Writer(s)	Album	Ref.
"247"	2022	BXN	Young-Luv.com	
"ASAP" (Note: The Japanese version was released as part of Poppy on November 23, 2022.) †‡	2021	Black Eyed Pilseung; Jeon Goon	Staydom	
"Beautiful Monster" †	2022	Black Eyed Pilseung; Jeon Goon; Rado; Flyt	We Need Love	
"Butterfly"	2022	BXN; Prime Time	Young-Luv.com	
"Complex"	2021	Black Eyed Pilseung; Jeon Goon; Rado	Stereotype	
"I'll Be There"	2021	Black Eyed Pilseung; Jeon Goon; Rado	Stereotype	
"I Like It"	2022	Black Eyed Pilseung; Jeon Goon; Rado	We Need Love	
"I Want U Baby"	2022	will.b van.gogh	Young-Luv.com	
"Like This"	2020	Black Eyed Pilseung; Jeon Goon; Rado	Star to a Young Culture	
"Love Fool"	2021	Black Eyed Pilseung	Staydom	
"Love"	2022	Black Eyed Pilseung; Jeon Goon; Flyt	We Need Love	
"Run2U"†	2022	B.E.P; Jeon Goon; Rado; FLYT	Young-Luv.com	
"Run2U" (Tak remix)	2022	Black Eyed Pilseung; Jeon Goon; Rado; Flyt; Tak	We Need Love	
"Poppy" ‡	2022	Black Eyed Pilseung; Co-sho; Rado; FLYT; Will.B	Poppy	
"Poppy" ‡	2023	Black Eyed Pilseung; Co-sho; Rado; FLYT; Will.B	Teddy Bear	
"Same Same"	2022	B.E.P; Jeon Goon	Young-Luv.com	
"Slow Down"	2021	Black Eyed Pilseung; Jeon Goon; Rado	Stereotype	
"So Bad" †	2020	Black Eyed Pilseung; Jeon Goon; Rado	Star to a Young Culture	
"So Bad" (Tak Remix)	2021	Black Eyed Pilseung; Jeon Goon; Tak	Staydom	
"So What"	2021	Black Eyed Pilseung; Jeon Goon	Staydom	
"Stereotype" †	2021	Black Eyed Pilseung; Jeon Goon; Rado	Stereotype	
"Teddy Bear" †	2023	B.E.P; Flyt; Jeon Goon	Teddy Bear	
"Young Luv"	2022	B.E.P; Jeon Goon; FLYT	Young-Luv.com	

== Other songs ==
Song	Year	Artist(s)	Album/Single	Ref.
"Star"	2022	All	Our Blues Part 8 OST	
