= High Up Entertainment =

South Korean entertainment company

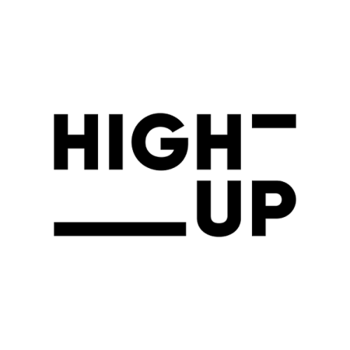
- Logo used since September 2020
- Native name: 하이업엔터테인먼트
- Type: Private
- Traded as: Unlisted
- Industry: Entertainment
- Genre: K-pop
- Founded: June 14, 2017; 9 years ago
- Founder: Black Eyed Pilseung
- Headquarters: 2nd floor, Y Building, 571-13 Yeonnam-dong, Mapo-gu, Seoul 03991
- Key people: Black Eyed Pilseung
- Parent: Kakao Entertainment (40%)
- Website: highup-ent.com

High Up Entertainment (Korean: 하이업엔터테인먼트), also known as just High Up, is a South Korean entertainment company formed under the partnership with CJ E&M in 2017. The company is home to artists such as STAYC, Park Si-eun, and Unchild.

== History ==
High Up Entertainment was founded on June 14, 2017, by the producer duo Black Eyed Pilseung in collaboration with CJ E&M. Black Eyed Pilseung has produced songs for multiple K-pop artists such as Twice, Miss A, Apink, and Sistar.

=== 2018 ===
In January 2018, they held a national talent-scouting audition tour.

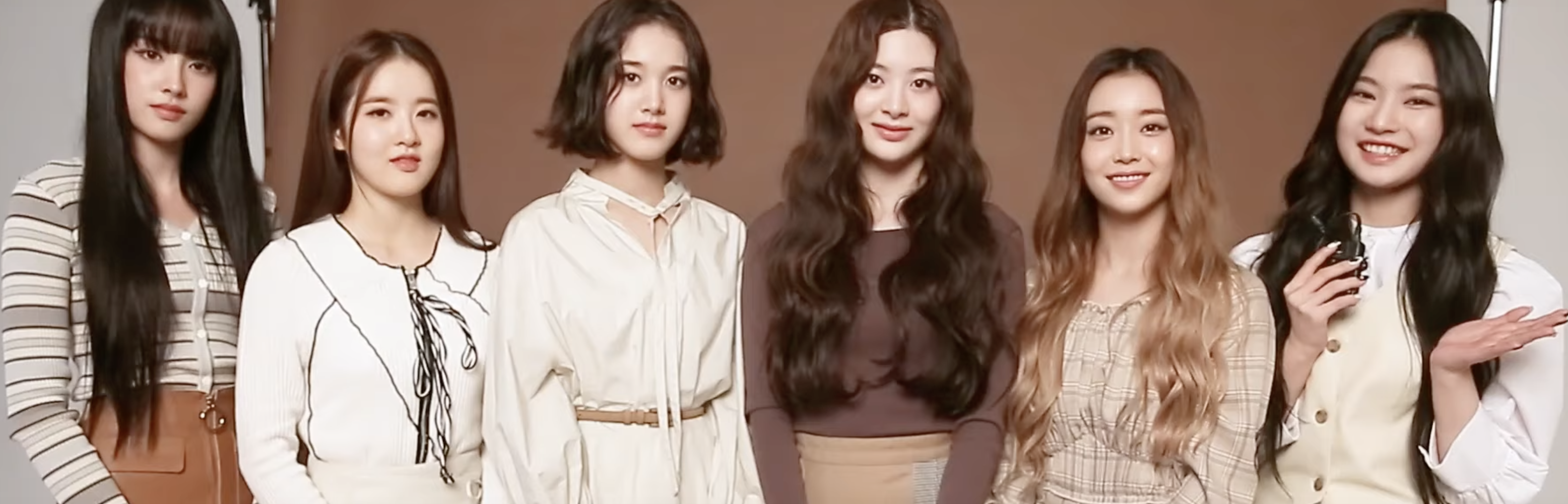
STAYC in 2020

On February 12, 2019, the company debuted their first duo, 415, with the digital single "Remember".

In December 2019, Park Si-eun signed a contract with the label and went on to become a member of STAYC.

In October 2020, they officially announced that the girl group STAYC, who had been previously introduced to the public as "High Up Girls", would debut with the single album Star to a Young Culture and its lead single "So Bad" on November 12 after 3 years of preparations.

In June 2021, Kakao Entertainment acquired 40% of the company's shares, becoming its largest shareholder.

The label has been able to gain attention for their group STAYC despite being a small company.

In April 2026, the label's second girl group Unchild debuted.

== Artists ==
=== Recording artists ===
==== Groups ====
- STAYC
- Unchild

==== Producers ====
- Rado

==== Actors/Actresses ====
- Park Si-eun

== Discography ==
Released	Title	Artist	Type	Ref.
February 12, 2019	"Remember"	415	Digital single	
March 17, 2019	"Take Me There"	415	Digital single	
April 15, 2019	"Shining Star"	415	Digital single	
August 29, 2019	"Between Us"	415	Digital single	
February 13, 2020	Miss	415	Extended play	
March 18, 2020	"When It Was Warm"	415	Digital single	
July 2, 2020	"No Wish No More" (feat. NAFLA)	415	Digital single	
November 12, 2020	Star to a Young Culture	STAYC	Single album	
April 8, 2021	Staydom	STAYC	Single album	
July 2, 2021	"Summer Nostalgia"	415	Digital single	
September 6, 2021	Stereotype	STAYC	Extended play	
February 21, 2022	Young-Luv.com	STAYC	Extended play	
July 19, 2022	We Need Love	STAYC	Single album	
November 16, 2022	Poppy	STAYC	Single album	
February 14, 2023	Teddy Bear	STAYC	Single album	
August 16, 2023	Teenfresh	STAYC	Extended play	
December 6, 2023	LIT	STAYC	Single album	
July 1, 2024	Metamorphic	STAYC	Studio album	
August 21, 2024	Meow	STAYC	Single album	
October 30, 2024	...I	STAYC	Single album	
March 18, 2025	S	STAYC	Single album	
July 23, 2025	I Want It	STAYC	Single album	
April 21, 2026	We Are Unchild	Unchild	Single album	
