= 31st Seoul Music Awards =

2022 award ceremony

- Date: January 23, 2022
- Venue: Gocheok Sky Dome
- Country: South Korea
- Hosted by: Kim Sung-joo; Boom; Kim Seol-hyun
- Website: seoulmusicawards.com

The 31st Seoul Music Awards (Korean: 31st 서울가요대상; RR: 31st Seoul Gayo Daesang) is an award ceremony held on January 23, 2022. It was organized by Sports Seoul and broadcast through KBS Joy, U+Idol Live, U+Mobile TV, and Hello Live. The ceremony was hosted by Kim Sung-joo, Boom, and Kim Seol-hyun.

== Criteria ==
All songs and albums that are eligible to be nominated must be released from January to December 2021.

Category	Online voting	Panelist	Music sales	Album sales
Main Prize (Bonsang)	30%	40%	30%	
Rookie of the Year	30%	40%	30%	
Popularity Award	100% (Korea Only)	—N/a		
K-wave Popularity Award	100% (Overseas Only)	—N/a		
Trot Award	30%	40%	30%	
Ballad Award	30%	40%	30%	
OST Award	30%	40%	30%	
R&B Hiphop Award	30%	40%	30%	
Best Performance	—N/a	100%	—N/a	
Band Award	—N/a	100%	—N/a	
Discovery of the Year	—N/a	100%	—N/a	
Special Judge Award	—N/a	100%	—N/a	

== Winners and nominees ==
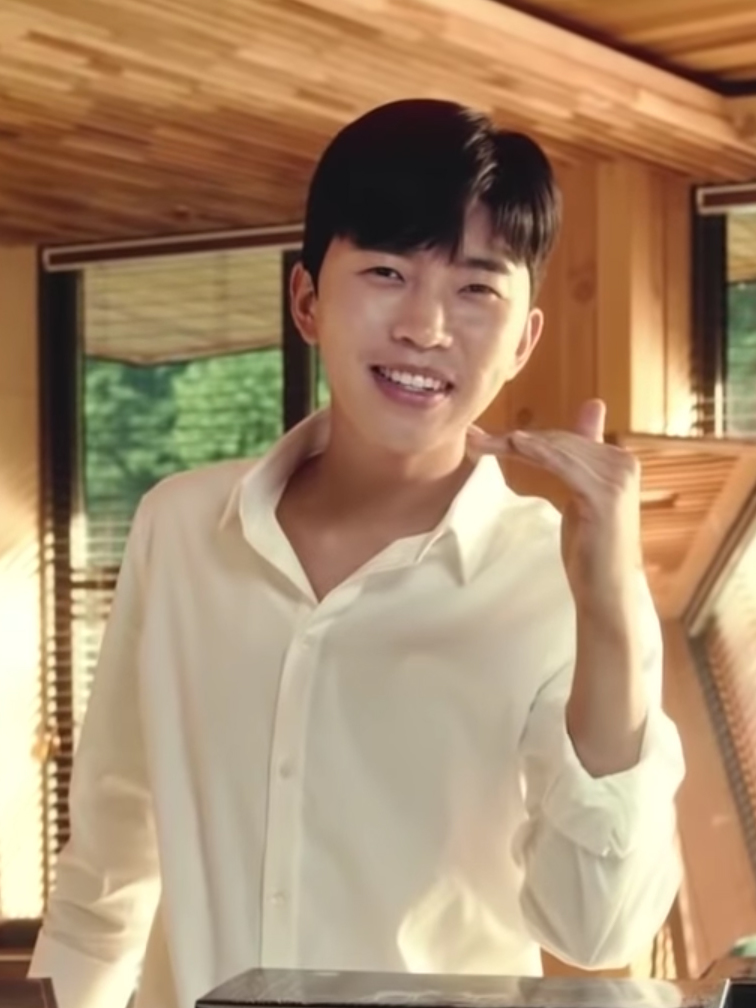
Lim Young-woong won four awards, including the Main Award (Bonsang), Popularity Award, Trot Award, and OST Award.

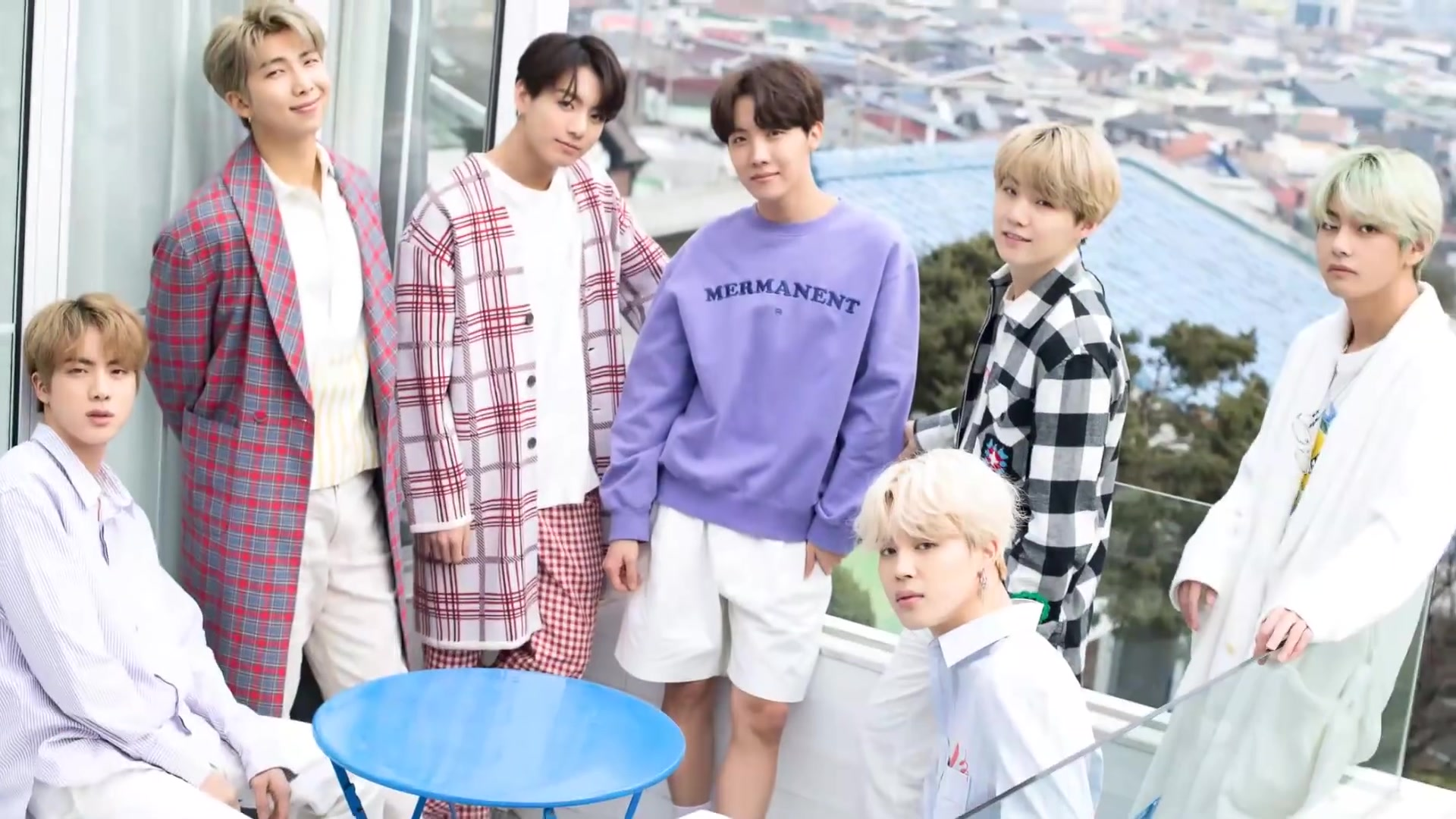
BTS won three awards, including the Main Award (Bonsang), World Best Artist Award, and U+Idol Live Best Artist Award.

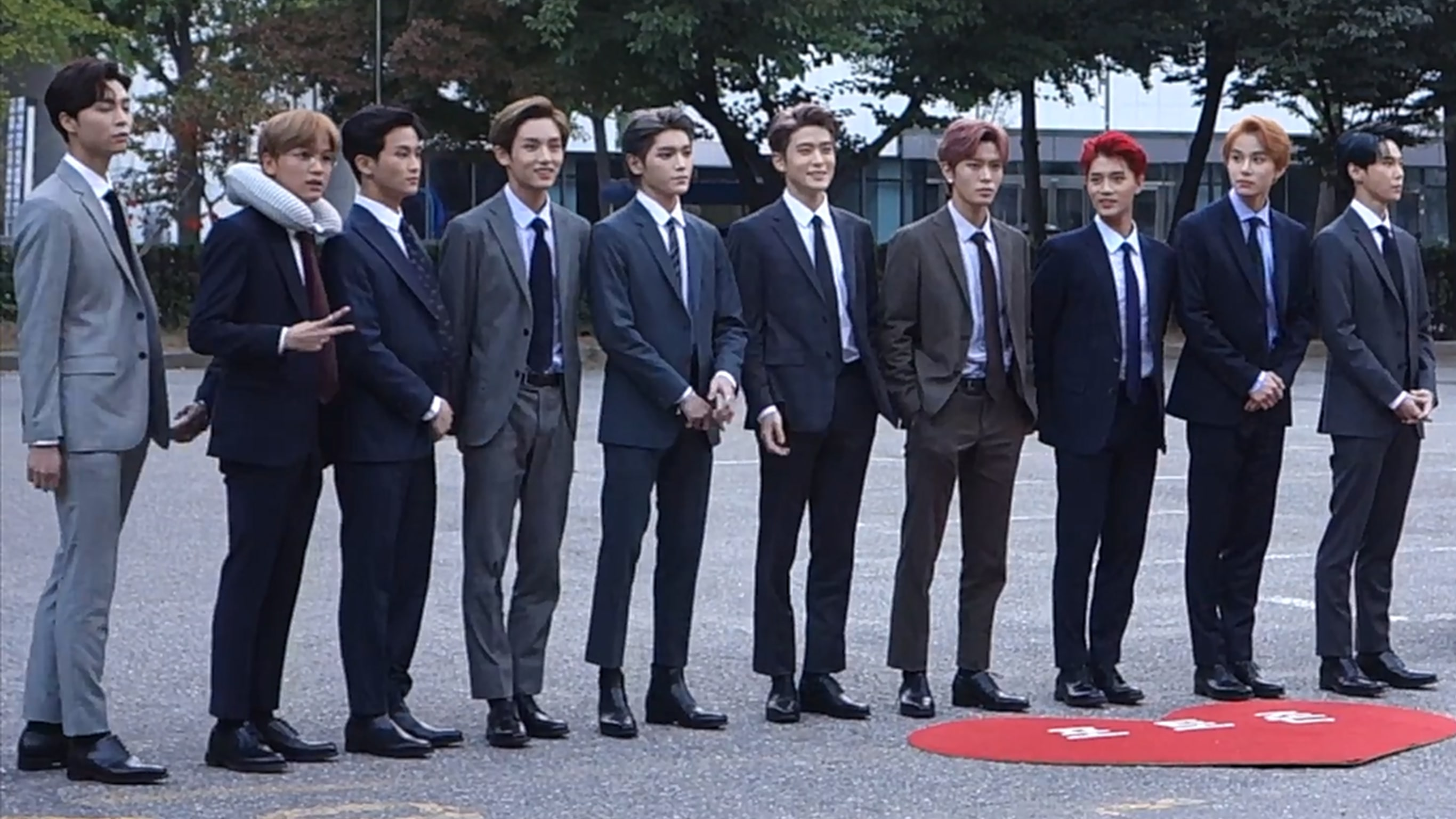
NCT 127 won two awards, including the Grand Prize Award (Daesang), and the Main Award (Bonsang).

Winners and nominees are listed in alphabetical order. Winners will be listed first and emphasized in bold.

The list of nominees for:

- U+Idol Live Best Artist Award were announced on December 6, 2021, through the Idol Live TV website.
- remaining categories were announced on December 4, 2021, through the official website.

The voting for:

- U+ Live Best Artist Award opened on Idol Live TV website on December 6, 2021, and closed on December 26, 2021.
- remaining categories opened on Seoul Music Awards mobile application on December 6, 2021, and closed on January 16, 2022.

=== Main awards ===
Grand Award (Daesang)	Main Award (Bonsang)
**NCT 127**; Aespa; Ateez; Brave Girls; BTS; Enhypen; Heize; IU; Kang Daniel; Lim Young-woong; Oh My Girl; Seventeen; The Boyz	**Aespa**; **Ateez**; **Brave Girls**; **BTS**; **Enhypen**; **Heize**; **IU**; **Kang Daniel**; **Lim Young-woong**; **NCT 127**; **Oh My Girl**; **Seventeen**; **The Boyz**; List of nominated artists: (G)I-dle; AB6IX; AKMU; Astro; Baekhyun; Big Mama; Cravity; D.O; Davichi; Epik High; Exo; Golden Child; Itzy; Jang Beom-june; Jeon Keon-ho & GyeongseoYeji; Jeon Somi; Joy; Jung Dong-ha; Lee Mu-jin; Lisa; MeloMance; Monsta X; MSG Wannabe; NCT Dream; NU'EST; ONF; Red Velvet; Rosé; Seventeen; Shinee; STAYC; Stray Kids; Super Junior; Taeyeon; Tomorrow X Together; Treasure; Twice
Best Song Award	Best Album Award
**IU – "Lilac"**	**NCT Dream – Hot Sauce**
Rookie of the Year	Best Performance
**Epex**; **Lee Mu-jin**; **Omega X**; Ive; Jo Yu-ri; Kwon Eun-bi; Lightsum; Mirae; Purple Kiss; T1419; Tri.be	**Enhypen**; **STAYC**
Popularity Award	K-wave Popularity Award
**Lim Young-woong**; List of nominated artists: (G)I-dle; AB6IX; AKMU; Aespa; Astro; Ateez; Baekhyun; Big Mama; Brave Girls; BTS; Cravity; D.O; Davichi; Enhypen; Epex; Epik High; Exo; Golden Child; Heize; Itzy; IU; Ive; Jang Beom-june; Jeon Keon-ho & GyeongseoYeji; Jeon Somi; Jo Yu-ri; Joy; Jung Dong-ha; Kang Daniel; Kassy; Kwon Eun-bi; Lee Mu-jin; Lightsum; Lisa; MeloMance; Mirae; Monsta X; MSG Wannabe; NCT 127; NCT Dream; NU'EST; Oh My Girl; Omega X; ONF; Purple Kiss; Red Velvet; Rosé; Seventeen; Shinee; STAYC; Stray Kids; Super Junior; T1419; Taeyeon; The Boyz; Tomorrow X Together; Treasure; Tri.be; Twice	**Exo**; List of nominated artists: (G)I-dle; AB6IX; AKMU; Aespa; Astro; Ateez; Baekhyun; Big Mama; Brave Girls; BTS; Cravity; D.O; Davichi; Enhypen; Epex; Epik High; Golden Child; Heize; Itzy; IU; Ive; Jang Beom-june; Jeon Keon-ho & GyeongseoYeji; Jeon Somi; Jo Yu-ri; Joy; Jung Dong-ha; Kang Daniel; Kassy; Kwon Eun-bi; Lee Mu-jin; Lightsum; Lim Young-woong; Lisa; MeloMance; Mirae; Monsta X; MSG Wannabe; NCT 127; NCT Dream; NU'EST; Oh My Girl; Omega X; ONF; Purple Kiss; Red Velvet; Rosé; Seventeen; Shinee; STAYC; Stray Kids; Super Junior; T1419; Taeyeon; The Boyz; Tomorrow X Together; Treasure; Tri.be; Twice

=== Genre-based awards ===
Trot Award	Ballad Award
**Lim Young-woong**; Jang Min-ho; Jeong Dong-wan; Jin Hae-sung; Kang Hye-yeon; Kim Hee-jae; Lee Chan-won; MJ; Second Aunt Kim Da-vi; Yang Ji-eun; Young Tak	**Wendy**; 2AM; Baek Ye-rin; Car the Garden; Heize; Hwang Chi-yeul; Jeon Keon-ho & GyeongseoYeji; Jung Dong-ha; Lee So-jung; MeloMance; Paul Kim; Sin Ye-young
OST Award	R&B Hiphop Award
**Lim Young-woong – "Love Always Run Away"**; 10cm – "Borrow Your Night"; Heize – "On Rainy Days"; Huh Gak – "Confession"; Jang Beom-june – "I Like You"; K.Will – "Back in Time"; Lee Hae-ri – "Love is Always Thirsty"; Lee Hi – "That One Word"; Lee Mu-jin – "Rain and You"; Sandeul – "The Image of You (Remains in My Memory)"; Yang Yo-seob & Jung Eun-ji – "Love Day"; Younha – "Thirty Nights"	**Hyuna**; Ash Island; BE'O; Bewhy; Epik High; Giriboy; Homies; Jessi; Jossiq; Mommy Son; Ovan

=== Other awards ===
World Best Artist Award	Special Judge Award
**BTS**	**Jung Dong-ha**
Discovery of the Year	U+Idol Live Best Artist Award
**Lang Lee**	**BTS**; List of nominated artists: AB6IX; Aespa; Apink; April; Astro; Ateez; Brave Girls; Btob; CL; Cravity; Day6; Dreamcatcher; Enhypen; Exo; Golden Child; Got7; Ha Sung-woon; Itzy; IU; Jeong Se-woon; Kang Daniel; Kim Hee-jae; Kim Jae-hwan; Kwon Eun-bi; Lim Young-woong; Loona; Lovelyz; Mamamoo; Monsta X; NCT 127; NCT Dream; NU'EST; Oh My Girl; Oneus; ONF; Park Ji-hoon; Red Velvet; Seventeen; SF9; STAYC; Stray Kids; Super Junior; Taeyeon; Treasure; The Boyz; Tomorrow X Together; Twice; Victon; Weki Meki; WJSN

=== Multiple awards ===
The following artist(s) received three or more awards:

Awards	Artist(s)
4	Lim Young-woong
3	BTS

== Presenters ==
The list of presenters was announced on January 18, 2022.

Order of the presentation, name of the artist(s), and award(s) they presented
Order	Artist(s)	Presented
1	Kang Hoon, and Han Ji-hyun	Rookie of the Year
2	Lim Hyung-guk, and Park Seon-joo	Trot Award + Ballad Award + OST Award
3	Park Ji-hyun	Main Award (Bonsang)
4	Kim Ho-young, and Moon Ye-won	Discovery of the Year + Best Performance
5	Chae Jong-hyeop	Main Award (Bonsang)
6	Rozy AI	Main Award (Bonsang)
7	Danny Ahn	Main Award (Bonsang)
8	Kang Baek-ho, Kang A-rang, and Kim Hye-seong	Popularity Award + K-wave Popularity Award + U+Idol Live Best Artist Award
9	Rozy AI	Main Award (Bonsang)
10	High1 Resort's Lee Sam-kul, and Won Jin-ah	Best Song Award + Best Album Award + World Best Artist Award
11	Sports CEO's Lee Jang-hyuk, and Seoul Music Awards chairman's Kim Soo-chul	Grand Award (Daesang)

== Performers ==
Order of the performance, name of the artist(s), and song(s) they performed
Order	Artist(s)	Song performed	Ref.
1	Omega X	"What's goin' on"	
2	Lee Mu-jin	"The Assignment Song" + "Traffic Light"	
3	Lang Lee	"There is A Wolf"	
4	STAYC	"So Bad" (Tak Remix) + "ASAP"	
5	Jung Dong-ha	"I Still Love You"	
6	Enhypen	"Blessed-Cursed" + "Tamed-Dashed"	
7	Hyuna	"I'm Not Cool"	
8	Brave Girls	"Fever" (Remix) + "Chi Mat Ba Ram"	
9	Kang Daniel	"Antidote" (Acoustic) + "Paranoia"	
10	Wendy	"Like Water"	
11	Hyuna & Dawn	"Ping Pong"	
12	The Boyz	"Russian Roulette" + "Maverick"	
13	Oh My Girl's Seunghee and Jiho	"Dear You"	
14	Oh My Girl's Mimi, YooA, and Arin	"The Fifth Season"	
15	Oh My Girl's Yubin and Hyojung	"Bungee"	
16	Oh My Girl	"Dun Dun Dance"	
17	Lim Young-woong	"Love Always Run Away"	
18	NCT Dream	"Hello Future" + "Hot Sauce"	
19	NCT 127	"Favorite (Vampire)" + "Lemonade" + "Sticker"	

== Broadcast ==
Region	Network/Platform	Ref.
South Korea	KBS Joy; U+Idol Live; U+ Mobile TV	
Various	Hello Live	
