= Beautiful Monster (STAYC song) =

Single by STAYC

from the EP We Need Love
- Language: Korean
- Released: July 19, 2022
- Genre: K-pop
- Length: 3:00
- Label: High Up; Kakao
- Composers: Black Eyed Pilseung; Jeon Goon; Flyt; Rado
- Lyricists: Black Eyed Pilseung; Jeon Goon

STAYC singles chronology
"Run2U" (2022)	"Beautiful Monster" (2022)	"Poppy" (2022)

Music video
- "Beautiful Monster" on YouTube

Professional ratings
Review scores
Source	Rating
IZM	3/5 stars

"Beautiful Monster" is a song recorded by South Korean girl group STAYC for their third single album We Need Love. It was released as the album's lead single by High Up Entertainment on July 19, 2022.

== Background and release ==
On June 30, 2022, High Up Entertainment announced STAYC would be releasing a new album in July 2022. A day later, it was announced STAYC would be releasing their third single album titled We Need Love on July 19. On July 15, the highlight medley video for We Need Love was released with "Beautiful Monster" announced as the lead single. Three days later, the music video teaser was released.

== Composition ==
"Beautiful Monster" was written and composed by Black Eyed Pilseung, alongside Jeon Goon for the lyrics, and Flyt for the composition, with arrangement handled by Rado and Flyt. The song was described as "capturing the fear hidden behind the happiness of love". "Beautiful Monster" was composed in the key of F-sharp major with a tempo of 82 beats per minute.

== Promotion ==
Prior to the release of We Need Love, STAYC held a live showcase to introduce the single album and its songs, including "Beautiful Monster", and communicate with their fans. The group subsequently performed on three music programs: Mnet's M Countdown on July 21, KBS's Music Bank on July 22, and MBC's Show! Music Core on July 23.

== Accolades ==
"Beautiful Monster" won a first place music program award on the July 26, 2022, episode of The Show.

== Credits and personnel ==
Credits adapted from We Need Love's liner notes.

Studio

- Ingrid Studio – recording, digital editing
- Vanguard Town – digital editing
- Koko Sound Studio – mixing
- The Mastering Place – mastering

Personnel

- STAYC – vocals, background vocals
- Ashley Alisha – background vocals
- Black Eyed Pilseung – lyrics, composition, production
- Jeon Goon – lyrics, composition, production
- Flyt – arrangement, bass, production
- Rado – arrangement, drums, digital editing
- Jeong Eun-kyung – recording, digital editing
- Yang Young-eun – recording
- Drk – mixing
- Kim Jun-sang – mixing (assistant)
- Ji Min-woo – mixing (assistant)
- On Seong-yoon – mixing (assistant)
- Kim Joon-young – mixing (assistant)
- Dave Kutch – mastering

== Charts ==
=== Weekly charts ===
Chart performance for "Beautiful Monster"
Chart (2022)	Peak position
Singapore Top Regional (RIAS)	24
South Korea (Circle)	44

=== Monthly charts ===
Monthly chart performance for "Beautiful Monster"
Chart (2022)	Position
South Korea (Circle)	113

== Release history ==
Release history for "Beautiful Monster"
Region	Date	Format	Label
Various	July 19, 2022	Digital download; streaming	High Up; Kakao
