= Cheeky Icy Thang =

Single by STAYC

from the album Metamorphic
- Language: Korean
- Released: July 1, 2024
- Studio: Vanguard Town
- Genre: Synth-pop
- Length: 2:31
- Label: High Up; Kakao
- Composers: B.E.P; Flyt
- Lyricists: B.E.P; Illson; On2pop; Jeong Ha-ri (153/Joombas); Jung Na-gyeong (153/Joombas); Jiggy (153/Joombas)

STAYC singles chronology
"Lit" (2023)	"Cheeky Icy Thang" (2024)	"Meow" (2024)

Music video
- "Cheeky Icy Thang" on YouTube

"Cheeky Icy Thang" is a song recorded by South Korean girl group STAYC for their first studio album, Metamorphic. It was released as the album's lead single by High Up Entertainment on July 1, 2024.

== Background and release ==
On June 3, 2024, High Up Entertainment announced that STAYC would be releasing their first studio album, Metamorphic, on July 1. On June 16, the track listing was released with "Cheeky Icy Thang" announced as the lead single. On June 23, the music video teaser was released. The highlight medley teaser videos was released on June 24 and 25. The song was released alongside its music video and the album on July 1.

== Composition ==
"Cheeky Icy Thang" was written and composed by B.E.P, with Illson, On2pop, Jeong Ha-ri (153/Joombas), Jeong Na-kyung (153/Joombas), and Jiggy (153/Joombas) participating in the lyrics writing, Flyt participating in the composition and arrangement, and Rado from B.E.P participating in the arrangement. It was described as a synth-pop song with "funky shuffle rhythm". "Cheeky Icy Thang" was composed in the key of D major, with a tempo of 131 beats per minute.

== Promotion ==
Prior to the release of Metamorphic, on July 1, 2024, STAYC held a live event aimed at introducing the album and its songs, including "Cheeky Icy Thang", and connecting with their fanbase. They subsequently performed on four music programs: Mnet's M Countdown on July 4, KBS's Music Bank on July 5, and MBC's Show! Music Core on July 6.

== Accolades ==
On South Korean music programs, "Cheeky Icy Thang" achieved first place win on the July 12 episode of Music Bank.

== Credits and personnel ==
Credits adapted from the album's liner notes.

Studio

- Vanguard Town – recording
- Ingrid Studio – digital editing
- Klang Studio – mixing
- The Mastering Palace – mastering

Personnel

- STAYC – vocals
- B.E.P – composition, lyrics
  - Rado – arrangement, programming, drums, synthesizer
  - Choi Kyu-sung – vocal arrangement, digital editing
- Flyt – composition, arrangement, recording, digital editing, programming, bass, keyboard, synthesizer
- Illson – lyrics
- On2pop – lyrics
- Jeong Ha-ri (153/Joombas) – lyrics
- Jung Na-gyeong (153/Joombas) – lyrics
- Jiggy (153/Joombas) – lyrics
- Jeong Eun-kyung – digital editing
- Will.B – digital editing
- Gu Jong-pil – mixing
- Hong Jang-mi – engineered for mix
- Dave Kutch – mastering
- Kevin Peterson – mastering (assistant)

== Charts ==
Chart performance for "Cheeky Icy Thang"
Chart (2024)	Peak position
South Korea (Circle)	118

== Release history ==
Release history for "Cheeky Icy Thang"
Region	Date	Format	Version	Label
Various	July 1, 2024	Digital download; streaming	Original	High Up; Kakao
Various	August 21, 2024	Digital download; streaming	Japanese	Universal Music Japan
Japan	August 21, 2024	CD	Japanese	Universal Music Japan
