= Metamorphic (album) =

- Digital cover

Studio album by STAYC
- Released: July 1, 2024
- Length: 39:29
- Language: Korean
- Label: High Up; Kakao

STAYC chronology
Teenfresh (2023)	Metamorphic (2024)	...l (2024)

Singles from Metamorphic
- 1. "Cheeky Icy Thang" Released: July 1, 2024

Metamorphic is the first studio album by South Korean girl group STAYC. It was released by High Up Entertainment on July 1, 2024, and contains 14 tracks, including the lead single "Cheeky Icy Thang".

== Background and release ==
On June 3, 2024, High Up Entertainment announced that STAYC would be releasing their first studio album titled Metamorphic on July 1. Eight days later, the trailer film was released. On June 16, the track listing was released with "Cheeky Icy Thang" announced as the lead single. On June 23, the first music video teaser for "Cheeky Icy Thang" was released. The highlight medley teaser videos was released on June 24 and 25. The album was released alongside the music video for "Cheeky Icy Thang" on July 1.

== Promotion ==
Prior to the release of Metamorphic, on July 1, 2024, STAYC held a live event aimed at introducing the album and connecting with their fanbase. Additionally, to commemorate the release of the album, they opened a pop-up store event in Seoul, South Korea, running from June 28 to July 21.

== Critical reception ==
Professional ratings
Review scores
Source	Rating
IZM	2/5 stars
NME	4/5 stars

Metamorphic received mixed-to-positive reviews from the music critics. Gladys Yeo of NME praised the album for showing the girl group's musical range, writing that STAYC "pushed themselves to their limits, exploring a myriad of new soundscapes and subject matter." Han Sung-hyun, in a mixed review writing for IZM, described it as a "passive collection of attempts that lack the symbolism of a first full-length album."

== Track listing ==
Track listing for Metamorphic
No.	Title	Lyrics	Music	Arrangement	Length
1.	"Twenty"	Jeon Goon	B.E.P; BXN	Rado	2:09
2.	"Cheeky Icy Thang"	B.E.P; Illson; On2pop; Jeong Ha-ri (153/Joombas); Jeong Na-kyung (153/Joombas); Jiggy (153/Joombas	B.E.P; Flyt	Rado; Flyt	2:31
3.	"1 Thing"	Jeon Goon	B.E.P; Flyt	Rado; Flyt	2:48
4.	"Give It 2 Me"	Jeon Goon	B.E.P; Flyt	Rado; Flyt	2:43
5.	"Find" (Sung by Sieun, Seeun, and J)	B&NAz (153/Joombas); Jeong Na-kyung (153/Joombas); Sin Sa-gang (XYXX); Yoon Ye-rim (JamFactory)	Jun Hyuk; Arineh Karimi	Jun Hyuk	2:14
6.	"Let Me Know"	Jeon Goon	B.E.P; Flyt; Will.b	Rado; Flyt	2:52
7.	"Nada"	Ffour (Lalala Studio); Pumpkin (Artiffect)	G'harah "PK" Degeddingseze; Tricia Battani; Kirsten Collins	G'harah "PK" Degeddingseze	3:06
8.	"Fakin'" (Sung by Sumin and Yoon)	Jeon Goon	B.E.P; Flyt	Flyt	2:46
9.	"Roses" (Sung by Isa)	B.E.P; Gyuahh; JP; Hansen	B.E.P; Gyuahh; JP; Hansen; Blienty	Gyuahh; JP; Hansen; Blienty	2:41
10.	"Beauty Bomb"	Young Chance; Youha; Gxxdkelvin	Benjmn; Young Chance; Youha	Benjmn	3:20
11.	"Gummy Bear"	Yoo Seo-hee (JamFactory); Woo Seung-yeon (153/Joombas); Jihye (JamFactory); Shin Jin-hye (JamFactory); Jang Han-bit (JamFactory)	Moa "Cazzi Opeia" Carlebecker; Ellen Berg; Harry Sommerdahl; Fabian "Phat Fabe" Torsson	Bangers & Cash	3:31
12.	"Stay with Me"	STAYC	El Capitxn; Maria Marcus; Zenur (Vendors); Nano (Vendors); Collin (Vendors)	El Capitxn; Zenur (Vendors)	2:59
13.	"Flexing on My Ex"	Illson; Sean Rhee	B.E.P; Flyt	Rado; Flyt	3:05
14.	"Trouble Maker"	Shim Eun-ji	Shim Eun-ji; Lee Hae-sol	Lee Hae-sol	2:44
Total length:					39:29

== Charts ==
=== Weekly charts ===
Weekly chart performance for Metamorphic
Chart (2024)	Peak position
South Korean Albums (Circle)	3

=== Monthly charts ===
Monthly chart performance for Metamorphic
Chart (2024)	Position
South Korean Albums (Circle)	17

== Release history ==
Release history for Metamorphic
Region	Date	Format	Label
South Korea	July 1, 2024	CD	High Up; Kakao
Various	July 1, 2024	Digital download; streaming	High Up; Kakao
