= ...l =

- Digital cover

Single album by STAYC
- Released: October 30, 2024
- Length: 12:54
- Language: Korean
- Label: High Up; Kakao

STAYC chronology
Metamorphic (2024)	...l (2024)	S (2025)

Singles from ...l
- 1. "GPT" Released: October 30, 2024

...l is the fifth single album by South Korean girl group STAYC. It was released by High Up Entertainment on October 30, 2024, and contains four tracks, including the lead single "GPT".

== Background and release ==
On September 1, 2024, High Up Entertainment released a teaser video titled "Stay Tuned" announcing that STAYC would be releasing new recording in October 2024. On October 2, it was announced that STAYC would be releasing new album in October 30. On October 17, it was announced that the single album titled ...l would be released digitally on October 30. On October 26, the track listing was released with "GPT" announced as the lead single. Two days later, the music video teaser for "GPT" was released. The single album was released alongside the music video for "GPT" on October 30.

== Track listing ==
Track listing for ...l
No.	Title	Lyrics	Music	Arrangement	Length
1.	"GPT"	Jeon Goon	B.E.P; Flyt	Rado; Flyt	3:09
2.	"Meant to Be" (너란 별을 만나)	BXN	BXN	BXN; Prime Time	3:43
3.	"GPT" (instrumental)		B.E.P; Flyt	Rado; Flyt	3:09
4.	"GPT" (acapella)	Jeon Goon	B.E.P; Flyt	Rado; Flyt	2:53
Total length:					12:54

== Release history ==
Release history for ...l
Region	Date	Format	Label
Various	October 30, 2024	Digital download; streaming	High Up; Kakao
