= Young-Luv.com =

- Digital cover

EP by STAYC
- Released: February 21, 2022
- Length: 19:30
- Language: Korean
- Label: High Up; Kakao

STAYC chronology
Stereotype (2021)	Young-Luv.com (2022)	We Need Love (2022)

Singles from Young-Luv.com
- 1. "Run2U" Released: February 21, 2022

Professional ratings
Review scores
Source	Rating
IZM	3.5/5 stars

Young-Luv.com is the second extended play by South Korean girl group STAYC. It was released by High Up Entertainment on February 21, 2022, and contains six tracks, including the lead single "Run2U".

== Background and release ==
On January 28, 2022, High Up Entertainment announced STAYC would be releasing a new album in February 2022. On February 8, it was announced STAYC would be releasing their second extended play Young-Luv.com on February 21. On February 16, the music video teaser for lead single "Run2U" was released. A day later, the highlight medley video teaser, together with the track listing, was released. The album was released on February 21.

== Promotion ==
Prior to the extended play's release, on February 21, 2022, STAYC held a live showcase on YouTube to introduce the extended play and communicate with their fans.

== Commercial performance ==
Young-Luv.com debuted at number one on South Korean's Gaon Album Chart in the chart issue dated February 20–26, 2022; on the monthly chart, the extended play debuted at number two in the chart issue dated February 2022 with 212,211 copies sold. In Japan, the extended play debuted at number 44 on the Oricon Albums Chart in the chart issue dated March 14, 2022.

== Track listing ==
Track listing for Young-Luv.com
No.	Title	Lyrics	Music	Arrangement	Length
1.	"Run2U"	B.E.P; Jeon Goon	B.E.P; Jeon Goon; FLYT	Rado; FLYT	3:33
2.	"Same Same"	B.E.P; Jeon Goon	B.E.P; Jeon Goon	Rado	3:01
3.	"247"	BXN	BXN	BXN	3:10
4.	"Young Luv"	B.E.P; Jeon Goon	B.E.P; Jeon Goon; FLYT	FLYT	3:26
5.	"Butterfly"	BXN	BXN; Prime Time	BXN	3:27
6.	"I Want U Baby"	will.b; van.gogh	will.b	will.b	2:53
Total length:					19:30

== Credits and personnel ==
Credits adapted from Melon.

Studio

- Ingrid Studio – recording, digital editing
- Koko Sound Studio – mixing
- Metropolis Mastering Studios – mastering

Personnel

- STAYC – vocals (track 1–6), background vocals (track 4 and 6)
- STAYC (Sieun) – background vocals (track 1–5)
- Jeon Goon – background vocals (track 1 and 4), lyrics (track 1–2, and 4), composition (track 1–2, and 4)
- FLYT – background vocals (track 4), composition (track 1 and 4), arrangement (track 1 and 4), keyboard (track 1 and 4), bass (track 1 and 4), drums (track 4), piano (track 4)
- Rado – background vocals (track 4), arrangement (track 1–2), drums (track 1–2), bass (track 2), keyboard (track 2)
- B.E.P – lyrics (track 1–2, and 4), composition (track 1–2, and 4)
- BXN – lyrics, composition, arrangement (track 3 and 5)
- will.b – lyrics, composition, arrangement, bass, MIDI programming (track 6)
- Prime Time – composition (track 5)
- van.gogh – composition (track 6)
- Jung Eun-kyung – recording, digital editing (track 1–6)
- DRK – mixing (track 1–6)
- Kim Jun-sang – mixing (assistant) (track 1–6)
- Kim Min-woo – mixing (assistant) (track 1–6)
- Stuart Hawkes – mastering (track 1–6)
- Jwa Haeng-seog – drums (track 3 and 5)
- Lee Gil-chan – keyboard (track 3 and 5)
- Byeon Mu-hyeog – piano (track 5)

== Charts ==
=== Weekly charts ===
Weekly chart performance for Young-Luv.com
Chart (2022)	Peak position
Japanese Albums (Oricon)	44
Japanese Hot Albums (Billboard Japan)	23
South Korean Albums (Gaon)	1

=== Monthly charts ===
Monthly chart performance for Young-Luv.com
Chart (2022)	Peak position
South Korean Albums (Gaon)	2

=== Year-end charts ===
Year-end chart performance for Young-Luv.com
Chart (2022)	Position
South Korean Albums (Circle)	53

== Certifications and sales ==
Certifications and sales for Young-Luv.com
Region	Certification	Certified units/sales
South Korea (KMCA)	Platinum	250,000^{^}
^{^} Shipments figures based on certification alone.

== Release history ==
Release history for Young-Luv.com
Region	Date	Format	Label
South Korea	February 21, 2022	CD	High Up; Kakao
Various	February 21, 2022	Digital download; streaming	High Up; Kakao
