= Run2U =

Single by STAYC

from the EP Young-Luv.com
- Language: Korean
- Released: February 21, 2022
- Genre: K-pop
- Length: 3:33
- Label: High Up; Kakao
- Composers: B.E.P; Jeon Goon; FLYT; Rado
- Lyricists: B.E.P; Jeon Goon

STAYC singles chronology
"Stereotype" (2021)	"Run2U" (2022)	"Beautiful Monster" (2022)

Music video
- "Run2U" on YouTube

"Run2U" (stylized in all caps) is a song recorded by South Korean girl group STAYC for their second extended play Young-Luv.com. It was released as the lead single by High Up Entertainment on February 21, 2022.

== Background and release ==
On January 28, 2022, High Up Entertainment announced STAYC would be releasing a new album in February 2022. On February 8, it was announced STAYC would be releasing their second extended play Young-Luv.com on February 21. On February 16, the music video teaser was released. A day later, the highlight medley video teaser was released. On February 20, the second music video teaser was released. The song alongside the music video was released on February 21.

== Composition ==
"Run2U" was written by B.E.P and Jeon Goon, with composition handled by the duo alongside FLYT, and arranged by Rado and FLYT. The song was described as song with "retro synth sound" with lyrics that "freely express the desire to run towards you with fearing for love, regardless of what others opinion". "Run2U" was composed in the key of B minor, with a tempo of 130 beats per minute.

== Commercial performance ==
"Run2U" debuted at number 29 on South Korea's Gaon Digital Chart in the chart issue dated March 5, 2022. The song ascended to number four in the chart issue dated March 6–12, 2022.

On the Billboard K-pop Hot 100, the song debuted at number 50 in the chart issue dated March 5, 2022, ascending to number three in the chart issue dated March 26, 2022. The song debuted at number 13 on the Billboard South Korea Songs in the chart issue dated May 7, 2022. In New Zealand, the song debuted at number 29 on the RMNZ Hot Singles in the chart issue dated February 28, 2022. In Singapore, the song debuted at number 22 on the RIAS Top Regional Chart in the chart issue dated February 18–24, 2022. In United States, the song debuted at number nine on the Billboard World Digital Song Sales in the chart issue dated March 5, 2022.

== Promotion ==
Prior to the extended play's release, on February 21, 2022, STAYC held a live showcase on YouTube to introduce the extended play and communicate with their fans. The group subsequently performed on four music programs on the first week: Mnet's M Countdown on February 24, KBS's Music Bank on February 25, MBC's Show! Music Core on February 26, and SBS's Inkigayo on February 27. On the second week, the group performed on six music programs: SBS MTV's The Show on March 1 where they won first place, MBC M's Show Champion on March 2, Mnet's M Countdown on March 3, KBS's Music Bank on March 4 where they won first place, MBC's Show! Music Core on March 5, and SBS's Inkigayo on March 6. On the third week, the group performed on two music programs: SBS MTV's The Show on March 8, and MBC M's Show Champion on March 9, where they won first place in both appearances.

== Credits and personnel ==
Credits adapted from Melon.

Studio

- Ingrid Studio – recording, digital editing
- Koko Sound Studio – mixing
- Metropolis Mastering Studios – mastering

Personnel

- STAYC – vocals
  - Sieun – background vocals
- Jeon Goon – background vocals, lyrics, composition
- FLYT – composition, arrangement, keyboard, bass
- Rado – arrangement, drums
- B.E.P – lyrics, composition
- Jung Eun-kyung – recording, digital editing
- DRK – mixing
- Kim Jun-sang – mixing (assistant)
- Kim Min-woo – mixing (assistant)
- Stuart Hawkes – mastering

== Charts ==
=== Weekly charts ===
Weekly chart performance for "Run2U"
Chart (2022)	Peak position
New Zealand Hot Singles (RMNZ)	29
Singapore (RIAS Regional)	22
South Korea (Gaon)	4
South Korea (K-pop Hot 100)	3
US World Digital Song Sales (Billboard)	9

=== Year-end chart ===
Year-end chart performance for "Run2U"
Chart (2022)	Peak position
South Korea (Circle)	72

== Accolades ==
Music program awards for "Run2U"
Program	Date	Ref.
M Countdown	March 10, 2022	
M Countdown	March 17, 2022	
Music Bank	March 4, 2022	
Music Bank	March 11, 2022	
Show Champion	March 9, 2022	
The Show	March 1, 2022	
The Show	March 8, 2022	

== Release history ==
Release history for "Run2U"
Region	Date	Format	Label
Various	February 21, 2022	Digital download; streaming	High Up; Kakao
