= Teddy Bear (STAYC song) =

Single by STAYC

from the album Teddy Bear
- Language: Korean
- Released: February 14, 2023
- Studio: Ingrid Studio (Seoul)
- Genre: Pop punk
- Length: 3:09
- Label: High Up; Kakao
- Composers: B.E.P; Jeon Goon
- Lyricists: B.E.P; FLYT

STAYC singles chronology
"Poppy" (2022)	"Teddy Bear" (2023)	"Bubble" (2023)

Music video
- "Teddy Bear" on YouTube

Professional ratings
Review scores
Source	Rating
IZM	3.5/5 stars

"Teddy Bear" is a song recorded by South Korean girl group STAYC for their fourth single album of the same name. It was released as the single album's lead single by High Up Entertainment on February 14, 2023.

== Background and release ==
On January 18, 2023, High Up Entertainment announced that STAYC would be releasing an album in February. On January 31, it was announced STAYC would be releasing their fourth single album titled Teddy Bear on February 14. The music video teasers were released on February 5 and 12.

== Composition ==
"Teddy Bear" was written by B.E.P with Flyt, composed by B.E.P and Jeon Goon, and arranged by Rado with Flyt. It was described as a pop punk song with lyrics that "contains a message of positivity that gives hope and comfort". "Teddy Bear" was composed in the key of G major, with a tempo of 119 beats per minute.

== Commercial performance ==
"Teddy Bear" debuted at number 56 on South Korea's Circle Digital Chart in the chart issue dated February 12–18, 2023. It ascended to number four in the chart issue dated March 5–11, 2023. On the monthly Circle Digital Chart, the song debuted at number 55 in the chart issue dated February 2023, ascending to number four in the following month. The song also debuted at number 16 on the Billboard South Korea Songs in the chart issue dated March 4, 2023.

== Promotion ==
Following the release of Teddy Bear, on February 14, 2023, STAYC held a live event to introduce the single album and its songs, including "Teddy Bear", and to communicate with their fans. The group subsequently performed four music programs in the first week: Mnet's M Countdown on February 16, KBS's Music Bank on February 17, MBC's Show! Music Core on February 18, and SBS's Inkigayo on February 19. On the second week of promotion, they performed on six music programs: SBS M's The Show on February 21, MBC M's Show Champion on February 22, M Countdown on February 23, Music Bank on February 24, Show! Music Core on February 25, and Inkigayo on February 26, where they won first place for all appearances except M Countdown and Show! Music Core. On the third week of promotion, they performed on six music programs: The Show on February 28, Show Champion on March 1, M Countdown on March 2, Music Bank on March 3, Show! Music Core on March 4, and Inkigayo on March 5. On the fourth and final week of promotion, they performed on three music programs: Show Champion on March 8, M Countdown on March 9, and Show! Music Core on March 11, where they won first place for all appearances except M Countdown.

== Accolades ==
Awards and nominations for "Teddy Bear"
Award ceremony	Year	Category	Result	Ref.
Circle Chart Music Awards	2024	New Icon of the Year	Won	
Golden Disc Awards	2024	Digital Song Bonsang	Won	

Music program awards for "Teddy Bear"
Program	Date	Ref.
Inkigayo	February 26, 2023	
Music Bank	February 24, 2023	
Show! Music Core	March 11, 2023	
Show Champion	February 22, 2023	
Show Champion	March 8, 2023	
The Show	February 21, 2023	

== Credits and personnel ==
Adapted from the album liner notes.

- STAYC – vocals
  - Sieun – chorus vocals
- B.E.P – lyrics, composition
  - Rado – arrangement, drums, chorus vocals, digital editing (at Vanguard Town)
- Jeon Goon – lyrics
- FLYT – composition, arrangement, keyboard, bass
- Jung Eun-kyung (정은경) – recording, digital editing (at Ingrid Studio)
- Yang Young-eun (양영은) – recording, digital editing (at Ingrid Studio)
- Kang Sun-young (강선영) – engineering
- Gu Jong-pil (구종필) – mixing (at Klang Studio)
- Joe LaPorta – mastering (at Sterling Sound)

== Charts ==
=== Weekly charts ===
Weekly chart performance for "Teddy Bear"
Chart (2023)	Peak position
South Korea (Circle)	4

Weekly chart performance for "Teddy Bear" (Japanese ver.)
Chart (2023)	Peak position
Japan (Japan Hot 100)	45
Japan (Oricon)	5
Japan Combined Singles (Oricon)	20

=== Monthly charts ===
Monthly chart performance for "Teddy Bear"
Chart (2023)	Peak position
South Korea (Circle)	4

Monthly chart performance for "Teddy Bear" (Japanese ver.)
Chart (2023)	Peak position
Japan (Oricon)	15

=== Year-end charts ===
Year-end chart performance for "Teddy Bear"
Chart (2023)	Position
South Korea (Circle)	16

== Release history ==
Release history for "Teddy Bear"
Region	Date	Format	Version	Label
Various	February 14, 2023	Digital download; streaming	Original	High Up; Kakao
Various	April 5, 2023	Digital download; streaming	Japanese	Universal Music Japan
Japan	April 5, 2023	CD	Japanese	Universal Music Japan
Various	September 19, 2025	Digital download; streaming	Chinese	High Up; Kakao

== See also ==
- List of Inkigayo Chart winners (2023)
- List of Music Bank Chart winners (2023)
- List of Show! Music Core Chart winners (2023)
- List of Show Champion Chart winners (2023)
- List of The Show Chart winners (2023)
