= One & Six =

EP by Apink
- Released: July 2, 2018
- Recorded: 2017–2018
- Studio: Seoul, South Korea
- Genre: K-pop; dance-pop; synth-pop
- Length: 20:42
- Label: Plan A Entertainment (Distributed by LOEN Entertainment)

Apink chronology
Pink Stories (2017)	One & Six (2018)	Percent (2019)

Singles from One & Six
- 1. "I'm So Sick" Released: July 2, 2018

One & Six is the seventh extended play by South Korean girl group Apink, released by Plan A Entertainment and distributed by LOEN Entertainment on July 2, 2018. The EP features six tracks, with "I'm So Sick" serving as the title track. The album debuted at number one on the Gaon Album Chart, and also entered Billboard's World Albums Chart at number 11. The physical release is available in two different versions: "One" and "Six".

== Background ==
Like their previous albums, members Chorong and Namjoo participated in writing songs for the album. The album name derives from fans being ONE in combination with the SIX members of Apink. The six-member group said the album's title “One & Six” simultaneously represents their vow to show all the different colors of the six members in one album and symbolizes the six members and their fans united as one for the band's seventh anniversary since their debut.

The album's lead single, “I’m So Sick" was co-produced and co-written by famous South Korean production and songwriting duo Black Eyed Pilseung, who worked with Apink back in 2016 for their single "Only One". "I'm So Sick" is a synth-pop and dance track with a chic, mature style, marking the first time Apink strayed from their signature cute and innocent image for the first time since their debut in 2011. The tropical sound of "I'm So Sick" boosted many interests in Apink as they swapped out their girlish image for something more mature.

== Promotion ==
Apink promoted "I'm So Sick" for 3 weeks as well as the whistle-laden B-side "A L R I G H T" on their comeback stages.

== Chart performance ==
One & Six debuted at number 1 on South Korea's Gaon Album Chart, becoming the group's third chart-topping album in the country while it debuted at number 11 on Billboard's World Albums chart, marking the group's highest peak on the chart. The single "I'm So Sick" debuted at number 7 on the Gaon Digital Chart, and peaked at number 3.

== Track listing ==
No.	Title	Lyrics	Music	Length
1.	"I'm So Sick" (1도 없어)	Black Eyed Pilseung; Jeon Gun	Black Eyed Pilseung; Jeon Gun; Rado	3:19
2.	"A L R I G H T"	GALACTIKA	GALACTIKA; Atenna	3:27
3.	"Don't Be Silly"	Park Cho-rong; luvssong	Hide	3:48
4.	"Forever Star" (별 그리고..)	Kim Nam-joo	1601	3:23
5.	"Promise Me" (말보다 너)	Shim Eun Ji	Lee Woo Min "collapsedone""; Mayu Wakisaka	3:29
6.	"I Like That Kiss"	Lee Joo Hyung (MonoTree); GDLO (MonoTree)	Lee Joo Hyung (MonoTree); GDLO (MonoTree)	3:10
Total length:				20:42

== Awards and nominations ==
Apink received 5 music program wins for "I'm So Sick" and won for the first time in 3 years on Music Bank. This success was followed by their win on Inkigayo, for the first time in 4 years since "Luv".

Music program wins
Song	Program	Date
"I'm So Sick"	The Show (SBS MTV)	July 10, 2018
"I'm So Sick"	The Show (SBS MTV)	July 17, 2018
"I'm So Sick"	Show Champion (MBC M)	July 11, 2018
"I'm So Sick"	Music Bank (KBS)	July 13, 2018
"I'm So Sick"	Inkigayo (SBS)	July 15, 2018

== Accolades ==
Year-end lists
Publisher	Year	Listicle	Work	Rank	Ref.
Dazed	2018	The 20 Best K-Pop Songs of 2018	I'm So Sick	9	

== Charts ==
=== Weekly charts ===
Chart (2018)	Peak position
South Korean Albums (Gaon)	1
Japanese Albums (Oricon)	32
US World Albums (Billboard)	11

=== Year-end charts ===
Chart (2018)	Position
South Korean Albums (Gaon)	68

== Sales ==
Chart	Sales
Gaon physical sales	64,030
Oricon physical sales	3,681

== Release history ==
Region	Date	Format	Label
Various	July 2, 2018	Digital download, streaming	Plan A Entertainment
