= STAYC =

South Korean girl group

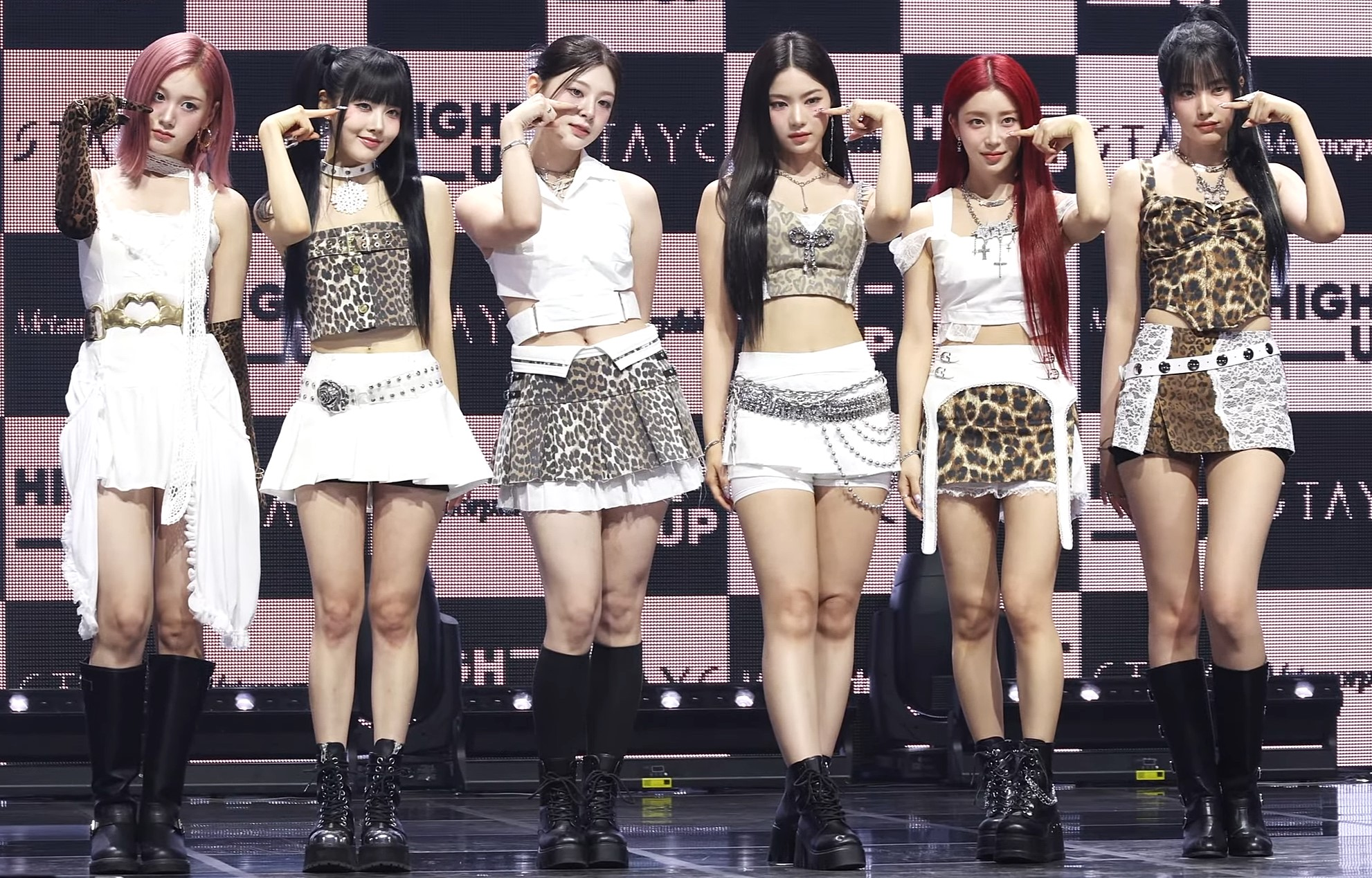
- STAYC in July 2024; L–R: J, Sieun, Seeun, Isa, Sumin, and Yoon.

Background information
- Origin: Seoul, South Korea
- Genre: K-pop
- Years active: 2020–present
- Labels: High Up; Mercury Tokyo
- Members: Sumin; Sieun; Isa; Seeun; Yoon; J
- Website: highup-ent.com/stayc

STAYC (/ˈsteɪsi/; Korean: 스테이씨; RR: Seuteissi, acronym for Star to a Young Culture) is a South Korean girl group formed by High Up Entertainment. The group is composed of six members: Sumin, Sieun, Isa, Seeun, Yoon, and J. Mainly produced by K-pop duo Black Eyed Pilseung, they debuted on November 12, 2020, with the release of their debut single album Star to a Young Culture. From September 2023 to March 2024 they embarked on their first world tour.

== History ==
=== 2016–2019: Pre-debut ===
Sieun was well-known prior to debut as both the daughter of veteran singer Park Nam-jung, and for her roles in dramas such as The Good Wife, Queen for Seven Days, and The Crowned Clown. She won the Youth Acting Award in 2018 SBS Drama Awards for her role in Still 17.

Seeun was known as an actress, appearing in shows like The Guardians and Circle.

Prior to debut, STAYC was known as "High Up Girls", named after their company, High Up Entertainment.

=== 2020: Debut with Star to a Young Culture ===
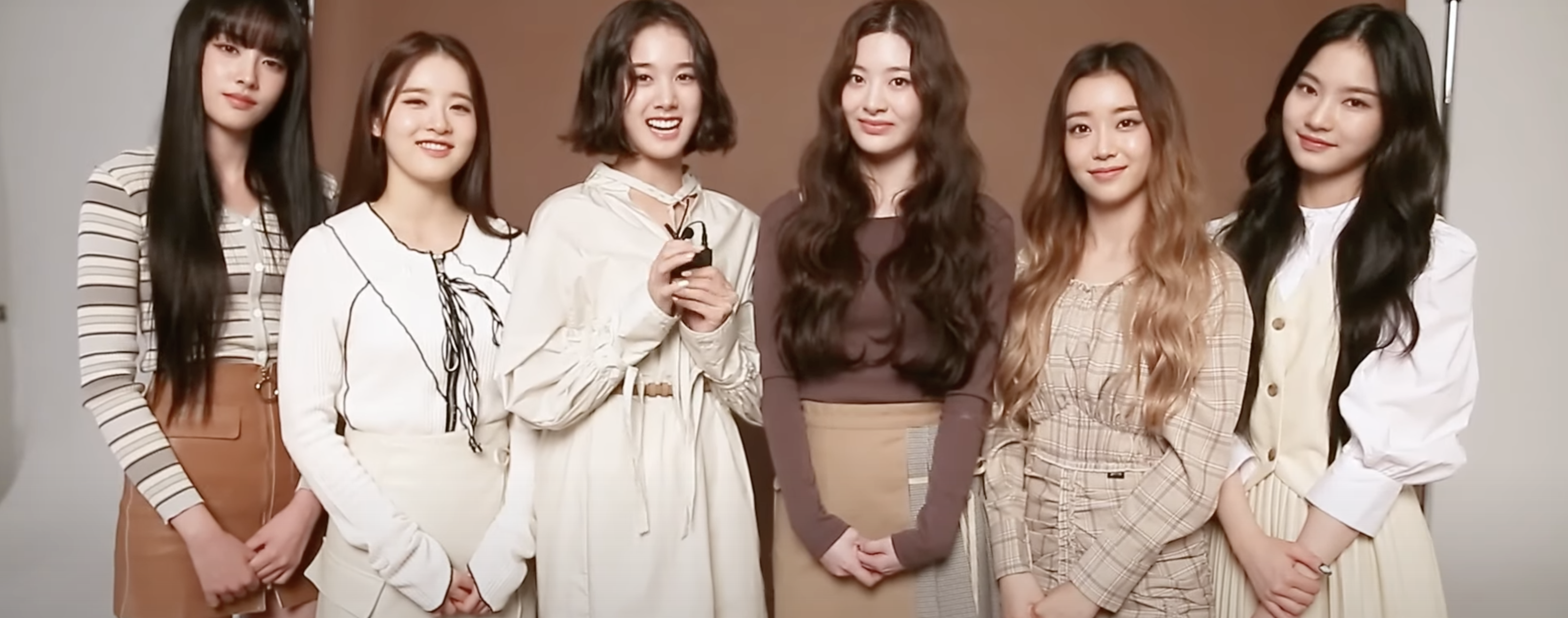
STAYC in November 2020

On September 8, it was announced that Black Eyed Pilseung of High Up Entertainment would debut their first girl group. On October 8, High Up Entertainment announced that the group would be debuting in November. The group's name was announced to be STAYC, which is an acronym for "Star to a Young Culture", and is meant to "reflect the act's aim of dominating pop culture". The members were officially revealed in pairs via prologue films from October 12 to 14 (in order: Sieun, Isa, Seeun, J, Sumin, and Yoon). On October 22, the title of their single album was announced to be Star to a Young Culture, with the lead single "So Bad". The teaser schedule was released the same day. The single album was announced to be produced by Black Eyed Pilseung, known for previous K-pop hits such as "TT", "Touch My Body", "Roller Coaster", and "Dumhdurum". The producing duo described the group's sound as "Teen Fresh", a combination of "Teen" and "Fresh", highlighting the group's "unique individual vocal colors". Prior to the album's release, promotions were done through 1theK's YouTube page. These included dance covers of groups such as Blackpink, BTS, and Stray Kids, which received over 1 million views, and a vocal cover of songs by Twice and Red Velvet which received over 2 million views.

On November 12, the music video for the album's lead single "So Bad" was released, receiving over 2.6 million views in the first 24 hours. Their album was released on the same day, selling over 4,300 copies on its first day, the most for a debut girl group in 2020. It went on to sell more than 10,000 copies on its first week, becoming the first debut album by a girl group in 2020 to do so. They promoted the album through a V Live debut showcase, promoting both the lead single, "So Bad" and B-side "Like This". The group made their music show debut on November 13, 2020, at Music Bank, which was followed up with performances at Show Champion, Inkigayo, and The Show. The album debuted at number 17 on the weekly Gaon Album Chart. "So Bad" debuted at number 90 on Billboard's K-pop Hot 100, and number 21 on the World Digital Song Sales chart.

=== 2021–2022: Staydom, Stereotype, Young-Luv.com, and We Need Love ===
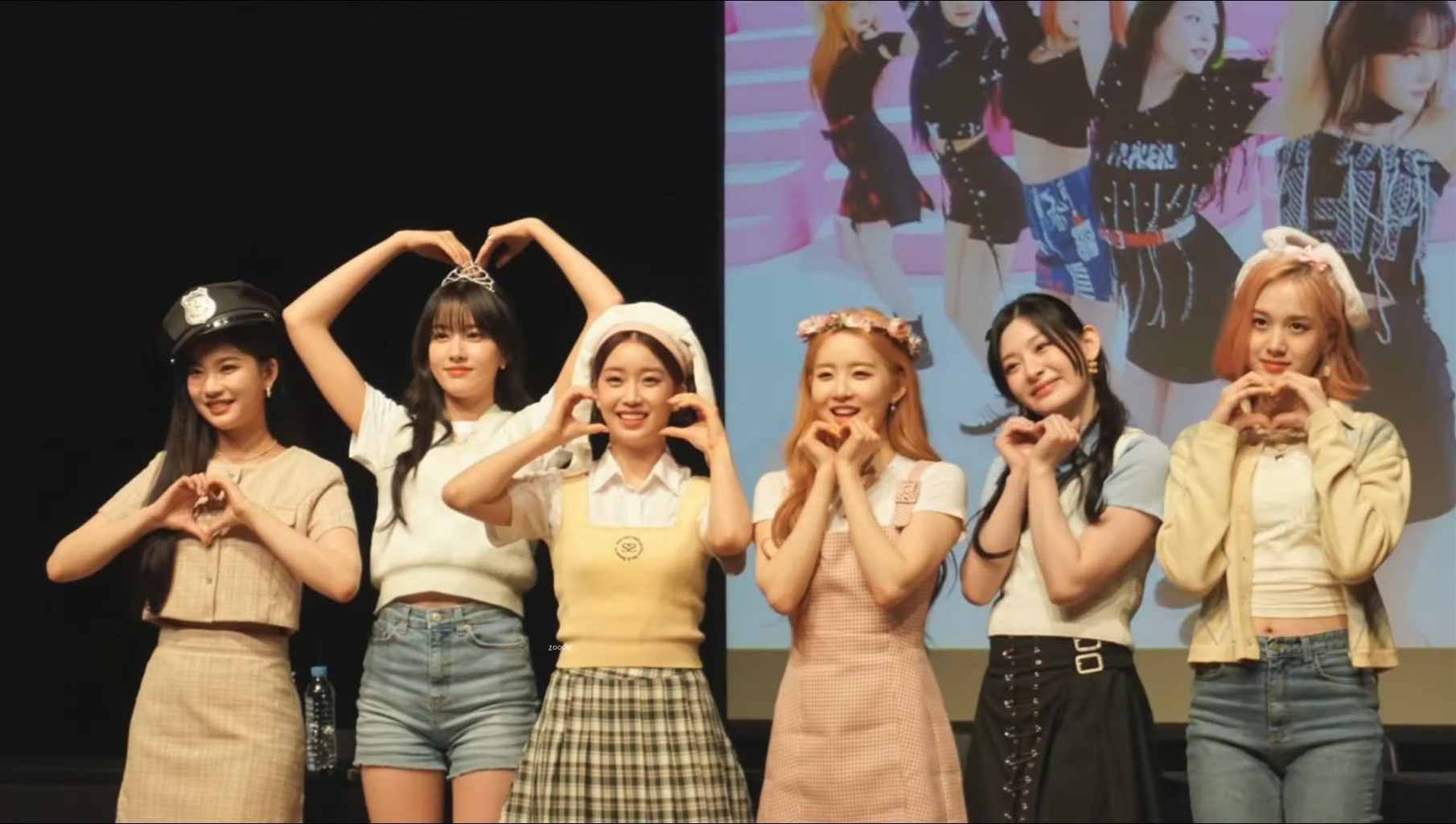
STAYC in May 2021

On April 1, 2021, STAYC were featured in the YouTube Originals docuseries K-Pop Evolution documenting "their trainee days" and debut process". Eight days later, they released their second single album Staydom and its lead single "ASAP". The music video of "ASAP" was released simultaneously with the album and reached 20 million views in nine days. The single also entered the Billboard K-pop 100 weekly chart. Staydom sold 56,198 copies in its first month.

On September 6, the group released their first extended play Stereotype and its lead single of the same name. The music video reached 30 million views in 21 days. The album recorded sales of over 114,000 copies in its first week. On September 14, the group received their first music show trophy on SBS MTV's The Show with an overall score of 8,760 points.

On February 21, 2022, STAYC released their second extended play Young-Luv.com and its lead single "Run2U". The album debuted atop the Gaon Album Chart, becoming their first number one album on the chart. The single peaked at number 4 on the Gaon Digital Chart.

On July 19, STAYC released their third single album We Need Love and its lead single "Beautiful Monster". It has been announced that the group will hold their first fan meeting on August 13.

On November 23, STAYC made their Japanese debut with the single "Poppy". The single peaked at number 7 on the Oricon Singles Chart.

=== 2023–2024: Teddy Bear, Teenfresh, Metamorphic, and ...l ===
On January 18, 2023, High Up Entertainment announced that STAYC would be releasing an album in February. On February 14, STAYC released their fourth single album titled Teddy Bear alongside the lead single of the same name. The album debuted at number one on South Korea's Circle Album Chart with 269,367 units sold. The single peaked at number four on Circle Digital Chart and number five on Billboard South Korea Songs.

On July 23, it was announced that STAYC would be releasing their third extended play titled Teenfresh on August 16. On July 27, it was officially announced that STAYC would be embarking on their first world tour, also titled Teenfresh. They finished the tour successfully on March 10, 2024, and immediately started working on a new album.

On June 3, 2024, High Up Entertainment announced that STAYC's first studio album Metamorphic would be released on July 1, with the lead single titled "Cheeky Icy Thang".

On October 17, High Up Entertainment announced that STAYC would be releasing a digital single album titled ...l on October 30, with the lead single "GPT". The Japanese version of GPT was released on November 13, along with "Tell Me Now".

=== 2025–present: S, I Want It, and 2:Love ===
On February 10, 2025, it was announced that STAYC would be kicking off their second world tour, Stay Tuned, in Seoul on April 12 and 13, while a new album was confirmed to be released in March. On February 24, High Up Entertainment announced that the group's fifth single album S would be released on March 18. On July 3, High Up Entertainment announced that STAYC would be releasing a special single album I Want It on July 23.

On February 11, 2026, STAYC released their first Japanese studio album, Stay Alive, with the lead single "Mwuah". On May 31, it was announced that the group would be releasing their sixth single album 2:Love on June 16.

== Members ==
- Sumin (수민)
- Sieun (시은)
- Isa (아이사)
- Seeun (세은)
- Yoon (윤)
- J (재이)

== Discography ==
=== Studio albums ===
List of studio albums, showing selected details, selected chart positions, and sales figures
Title	Details	Peak chart positions		Sales
Title	Details	KOR	JPN	Sales
Metamorphic	Released: July 1, 2024; Label: High Up; Formats: CD, digital download, streaming	3	—	KOR: 114,766
Stay Alive	Released: February 11, 2026; Label: Universal Music Japan; Formats: CD, digital download, streaming; Track listing: 1. "Mwuah"; 2. "I Want It" (Japanese version); 3. "Bebe" (Japanese version); 4. "Poppy"; 5. "Teddy Bear" (Japanese version); 6. "ASAP" (Japanese version); 7. "Lit"; 8. "Stereotype" (Japanese version); 9. "Tell Me Now"; 10. "Satellite"; 11. "Lover, Killer"; 12. "Say My Name"; 13. "Meow"; 14. "GPT" (Japanese version); 15. "Bubble" (Japanese version); 16. "Cheeky Icy Thang" (Japanese version); 17. "Stay with Me" (Japanese version)	—	9	JPN: 5,718
"—" denotes releases that did not chart or were not released in that region.

=== Extended plays ===
List of extended plays, showing selected details, selected chart positions, sales figures, and certifications
Title	Details	Peak chart positions				Sales	Certifications
Title	Details	KOR	JPN	US Sales	US World	Sales	Certifications
Stereotype	Released: September 6, 2021; Label: High Up; Formats: CD, digital download, streaming	2	25	—	—	KOR: 208,039; JPN: 2,078 (Phy.)	
Young-Luv.com	Released: February 21, 2022; Label: High Up; Formats: CD, digital download, streaming	1	44	—	—	KOR: 258,572; JPN: 1,002 (Phy.)	KMCA: Platinum
Teenfresh	Released: August 16, 2023; Label: High Up; Formats: CD, digital download, streaming	3	45	40	14	KOR: 379,573; JPN: 738 (Phy.)	KMCA: Platinum
"—" denotes releases that did not chart or were not released in that region.

=== Single albums ===
List of single albums, showing selected details, selected chart positions, sales figures, and certifications
Title	Details	Peak chart positions	Sales	Certifications
Title	Details	KOR	Sales	Certifications
Star to a Young Culture	Released: November 12, 2020; Label: High Up; Formats: CD, digital download, streaming	6	KOR: 70,262	
Staydom	Released: April 8, 2021; Label: High Up; Formats: CD, digital download, streaming	9	KOR: 105,300	
We Need Love	Released: July 19, 2022; Label: High Up; Formats: CD, digital download, streaming	2	KOR: 261,827	KMCA: Platinum
Teddy Bear	Released: February 14, 2023; Label: High Up; Formats: CD, digital download, streaming	1	KOR: 415,233	KMCA: Platinum
...l	Released: October 30, 2024; Label: High Up; Formats: Digital download, streaming	—	—N/a	
S	Released: March 18, 2025; Label: High Up; Formats: CD, digital download, streaming; Track listing: 1. "Bebe"; 2. "Diamond"; 3. "Pipe Down"	4	KOR: 133,136	
I Want It	Released: July 23, 2025; Label: High Up; Formats: CD, digital download, streaming; Track listing: 1. "I Want It"; 2. "Boy"; 3. "Honestly" (반칙)	6	KOR: 82,253	
2:Love	Released: June 16, 2026; Label: High Up; Formats: CD, digital download, streaming; Track listing: 1. "2 L0ve"; 2. "Where You At?"; 3. "Sorry"; 4. "Beat My Love"	11	KOR: 35,489	
"—" denotes releases that did not chart or were not released in that region.

=== Singles ===
==== Korean singles ====
List of Korean singles, showing year released, selected chart positions, certifications, and name of the album
Title	Year	Peak chart positions						Certifications	Album
Title	Year	KOR	KOR Billb. (Note: Includes the Billboard K-pop Hot 100 (defunct as of 2022), and South Korea Songs (part of Billboard's Hits of the World (2022 onwards)).)	NZ Hot	SGP	US World	CHN KOR	Certifications	Album
"So Bad"	2020	159	82	—	—	21	—N/a (Note: Prior to the launch of the TME Korean Chart in Jan. 2024, chart data was only available via individual streaming services.)		Star to a Young Culture
"ASAP" (Note: The Japanese version of "ASAP" was included in STAYC's debut Japanese single "Poppy", released on November 23, 2022.)	2021	9	9	—	—	—	—N/a	KMCA: Platinum (st.)	Staydom
"Stereotype" (색안경) (Note: The Japanese version of "Stereotype" was included in STAYC's second Japanese single "Teddy Bear" (Japanese version), released on April 5, 2023.) (Note: The Chinese version of "Stereotype" was released on February 5, 2026.)	2021	27	17	—	22	16	—N/a		Stereotype
"Run2U"	2022	4	3	29	— (Note: "Run2U" did not enter the RIAS Top Streaming Chart, but debuted at position 22 on the RIAS Top Regional Chart.)	9	—N/a		Young-Luv.com
"Beautiful Monster"	2022	44	19	—	— (Note: "Beautiful Monster" did not enter the RIAS Top Streaming Chart, but debuted at position 24 on the RIAS Top Regional Chart.)	—	—N/a		We Need Love
"Poppy" (Korean version)	2023	19	12	—	—	—	—N/a		Teddy Bear
"Teddy Bear" (Note: The Chinese version of "Teddy Bear" was released on September 19, 2025.)	2023	4	5	—	—	—	—N/a		Teddy Bear
"Bubble" (Note: The Japanese version of "Bubble" was included in STAYC's third Japanese single "Lit", released on December 6, 2023.)	2023	11	14	—	—	—	—N/a		Teenfresh
"Cheeky Icy Thang" (Note: The Japanese version of "Cheeky Icy Thang" was included in STAYC's fourth Japanese single "Meow / Cheeky Icy Thang (Japanese Ver.)", released on August 21, 2024.)	2024	118	—	—	—	—	88		Metamorphic
"GPT" (Note: The Japanese version of "GPT" was included in STAYC's fifth Japanese single "GPT (Japanese Ver.) / Tell Me Now", released on November 13, 2024.)	2024	165	—	—	—	—	—		...l
"Bebe" (Note: The Japanese version of "Bebe" was included in STAYC's sixth Japanese single "Lover, Killer / Bebe (Japanese Ver.)", released on June 4, 2025.)	2025	126	—	—	—	—	95		S
"I Want It" (Note: The Japanese version of "I Want It" was included in STAYC's debut Japanese studio album Stay Alive, released on February 10, 2026.)	2025	— (Note: "I Want It" did not enter the Circle Digital Chart, but it peaked at number 18 on the component Circle Download Chart.)	—	—	—	—	—		I Want It
"2 L0ve"	2026	161	—	—	—	—	100		2:Love
"—" denotes releases that did not chart or were not released in that region.

==== Japanese singles ====
List of Japanese singles, showing year released, selected chart positions, sales figures, and name of the album
Title	Year	Peak chart positions		Sales	Album
Title	Year	JPN	JPN Hot	Sales	Album
"Poppy"	2022	13	99	JPN: 8,331 (phy.)	Stay Alive
"Teddy Bear" (Japanese version)	2023	5	45	JPN: 18,271 (phy.)	Stay Alive
"Lit"	2023	3	93	JPN: 10,628 (phy.)	Stay Alive
"Meow"	2024	7	— (Note: "Meow" / "Cheeky Icy Thang" (Japanese version) did not enter the Billboard Japan Hot 100, but it peaked at number 7 on the Top Singles Sales.)	JPN: 12,276 (phy.)	Stay Alive
"Cheeky Icy Thang" (Japanese version)	2024	7	—	JPN: 12,276 (phy.)	Stay Alive
"GPT" (Japanese version)	2024	6	— (Note: "GPT" (Japanese version) / "Tell Me Now" did not enter the Billboard Japan Hot 100, but it peaked at number 7 on the Top Singles Sales.)	JPN: 9,035 (phy.)	Stay Alive
"Tell Me Now"	2024	6	—	JPN: 9,035 (phy.)	Stay Alive
"Lover, Killer"	2025	12	— (Note: "Lover, Killer" / "Bebe" (Japanese version) did not enter the Billboard Japan Hot 100, but it peaked at number 12 on the Top Singles Sales.)	JPN: 5,638 (phy.)	Stay Alive
"Bebe" (Japanese version)	2025	12	—	JPN: 5,638 (phy.)	Stay Alive
"Mwuah"	2026	—	—	—N/a	Stay Alive
"—" denotes releases that did not chart or were not released in that region.

=== Soundtrack appearances ===
List of soundtrack appearances, showing year released, selected chart positions, and name of the album
Title	Year	Peak chart positions	Album
Title	Year	KOR	Album
"Star"	2022	170	Our Blues OST

=== Promotional singles ===
List of promotional singles, showing year released, selected chart positions, and album name
Title	Year	Peak chart positions	Album
Title	Year	KOR DL	Album
"Fancy" (Note: Remake for Spotify Singles)	2024	—	Non-album singles
"Over U, 안녕" (Over U, Goodbye) (Note: Credited under STAYC but the track is only sung by Seeun and J.)	2024	77	Non-album singles
"—" denotes a recording that did not chart in that territory.

=== Other charted songs ===
List of other charted songs, showing year released, selected chart positions, and name of the album
Title	Year	Peak chart positions	Album
Title	Year	KOR Down.	Album
"So What"	2021	143	Staydom
"Love Fool" (사랑은 원래 이렇게 아픈 건가요)	2021	190	Staydom
"I'll Be There"	2021	71	Stereotype
"Slow Down"	2021	76	Stereotype
"Complex"	2021	87	Stereotype
"Same Same"	2022	91	Young-Luv.com
"247"	2022	97	Young-Luv.com
"Young Luv"	2022	70	Young-Luv.com
"Butterfly"	2022	101	Young-Luv.com
"I Want U Baby"	2022	117	Young-Luv.com
"I Like It"	2022	75	We Need Love
"Love"	2022	66	We Need Love
"Not Like You"	2023	36	Teenfresh
"I Wanna Do"	2023	38	Teenfresh
"Be Mine"	2023	46	Teenfresh
"1 Thing"	2024	58	Metamorphic
"Stay with Me"	2024	61	Metamorphic
"Twenty"	2024	63	Metamorphic
"Flexing on My Ex"	2024	64	Metamorphic
"Fakin'" (Note: Credited under STAYC but the track is only sung by Sumin and Yoon.)	2024	70	Metamorphic
"Let Me Know"	2024	71	Metamorphic
"Give It 2 Me"	2024	72	Metamorphic
"Trouble Maker"	2024	74	Metamorphic
"Find" (Note: Credited under STAYC but the track is only sung by Sieun, Seeun, and J.)	2024	76	Metamorphic
"Beauty Bomb"	2024	78	Metamorphic
"Nada"	2024	79	Metamorphic
"Gummy Bear"	2024	80	Metamorphic
"Roses" (Note: Credited under STAYC but the track is a solo by Isa.)	2024	81	Metamorphic
"Meant To Be" (너란 별을 만나)	2024	56	...I
"GPT (Acapella)"	2024	79	...I
"GPT (Instrumental)"	2024	81	...I
"Diamond"	2025	55	S
"Pipe Down"	2025	56	S
"Honestly" (반칙)	2025	53	I Want It
"Boy"	2025	55	I Want It

== Videography ==
=== Music videos ===
Title	Year	Director(s)	Ref.
"So Bad"	2020	Lee Min-jun, Lee Ha-young (Moswantd)	
"ASAP"	2021	Han Sa-min (Dextor-Lab)	
"Stereotype"	2021	Woogie Kim (Mother Media)	
"Run2U"	2022	Woogie Kim (Mother Media)	
"Beautiful Monster"	2022	Flexible Pictures	
"Poppy"	2022	Novv Kim (Novv)	
"Poppy (Korean Ver.)" (Performance Video)	2023	Novv Kim (Novv)	
"Teddy Bear"	2023	Novv Kim (Novv)	
"Teddy Bear (Japanese Ver.)"	2023	88GH (KeepUsWeird)	
"Bubble"	2023	Naive Creative Production	
"Lit"	2023	Korlio (August Frog)	
"Cheeky Icy Thang"	2024	Soonsik Yang	
"Meow"	2024	Hayato Ando	
"GPT"	2024	Vin Kim (Kepler Lab)	
"Bebe"	2025	Zanybros	
"I Want It"	2025	Korlio & Magneto	
"Mwuah"	2026	Unknown	
"2 L0ve"	2026	Kyungho Kim	

== Filmography ==
=== Web shows ===
Year	Title	Notes	Ref.
2020–present	Stay:See	Behind the scenes of the members' activities	
2021	Staycation	Reality show series	
2023	Pang Pang STAYC	Reality show series	
2023	STAYC's Burden Transaction	Variety show series	

== Concerts and tours ==
- Teenfresh World Tour (2023–2024)
- Stay Tuned Tour (2025)
- Stay Closer Tour (2026)

== Accolades ==
=== Awards and nominations ===
Name of the award ceremony, year presented, category, nominee of the award, and the result of the nomination
Award ceremony	Year	Category	Nominee / Work	Result	Ref.
Asia Artist Awards	2021	New Wave Singer Award	STAYC	Won	
Asia Artist Awards	2021	Female Idol Popularity Award	STAYC	Nominated	
Asia Artist Awards	2023	Best Musician Award	STAYC	Won	
Asia Model Awards	2021	Rookie of the Year	STAYC	Won	
Asia Star Entertainer Awards	2024	The Best Star	STAYC	Won	
Asian Pop Music Awards	2021	Best New Artist (Overseas)	STAYC	Nominated	
Brand Customer Loyalty Award	2021	Best Female Rookie Award	STAYC	Won	
Brand Customer Loyalty Award	2022	Female Idol (Rising Star)	STAYC	Won	
Brand of the Year Awards	2021	Female Rookie Idol Award	STAYC	Nominated	
Circle Chart Music Awards	2021	New Artist of the Year - Digital	"So Bad"	Nominated	
Circle Chart Music Awards	2022	Discovery of the Year – Hot Trend	STAYC	Won	
Circle Chart Music Awards	2022	Artist of the Year (Digital Music) – September	"Stereotype"	Nominated	
Circle Chart Music Awards	2023	World Rookie of the Year	STAYC	Won	
Circle Chart Music Awards	2023	Song of the Year – February	"Run2U"	Nominated	
Circle Chart Music Awards	2024	New Icon of the Year	"Teddy Bear"	Won	
The Fact Music Awards	2021	Next Leader Award	STAYC	Won	
The Fact Music Awards	2021	Fan & Star Choice Award (Artist)	STAYC	Nominated	
Golden Disc Awards	2022	Digital Song Bonsang	"ASAP"	Won	
Golden Disc Awards	2022	Rookie of the Year Award	STAYC	Won	
Golden Disc Awards	2022	Seezn Most Popular Artist Award	STAYC	Nominated	
Golden Disc Awards	2024	Digital Song Bonsang	"Teddy Bear"	Won	
Golden Disc Awards	2024	Digital Daesang	"Teddy Bear"	Nominated	
Hanteo Music Awards	2023	Artist of the Year (Bonsang)	STAYC	Won	
KBS Entertainment Awards	2025	Digital Content Award (Note: Shared with the whole cast.)	Idol 1N2D	Won	
K-Global Heart Dream Awards	2023	K-Global Bonsang (Main Prize)	STAYC	Won	
Korea Culture Entertainment Awards	2021	K-Pop Star Award	STAYC	Won	
Korea First Brand Awards	2022	Female Idol Rising Star Award	STAYC	Nominated	
Korean Music Awards	2022	Best K-pop Song	"ASAP"	Nominated	
Korean Music Awards	2022	Rookie of the Year	STAYC	Nominated	
Melon Music Awards	2021	1theK Original Content Award	STAYC	Won	
Melon Music Awards	2021	Best Female Group	STAYC	Nominated	
Melon Music Awards	2021	Netizen Popularity Award	STAYC	Nominated	
Melon Music Awards	2021	New Artist of the Year	STAYC	Nominated	
Melon Music Awards	2021	Top 10 Artist	STAYC	Nominated	
Melon Music Awards	2022	Global Rising Artist	STAYC	Won	
Melon Music Awards	2022	Artist of the Year	STAYC	Longlisted	
Melon Music Awards	2022	Top 10 Artist	STAYC	Nominated	
Melon Music Awards	2023	Music Video of the Year	"Bubble"	Won	
Melon Music Awards	2023	Top 10 Artist	STAYC	Nominated	
Mnet Asian Music Awards	2021	Best Dance Performance – Female Group	"ASAP"	Nominated	
Mnet Asian Music Awards	2021	Best New Female Artist	STAYC	Nominated	
Mnet Asian Music Awards	2021	Song of the Year	"ASAP"	Longlisted	
Mnet Asian Music Awards	2021	Worldwide Fans' Choice Top 10	STAYC	Nominated	
MTV Europe Music Awards	2021	Best Korean Act	STAYC	Nominated	
Seoul Music Awards	2021	K-wave Popularity Award	STAYC	Nominated	
Seoul Music Awards	2021	Popularity Award	STAYC	Nominated	
Seoul Music Awards	2021	Rookie of the Year	STAYC	Nominated	
Seoul Music Awards	2022	Best Performance	STAYC	Won	
Seoul Music Awards	2022	K-wave Popularity Award	STAYC	Nominated	
Seoul Music Awards	2022	Main Award (Bonsang)	STAYC	Nominated	
Seoul Music Awards	2022	Popularity Award	STAYC	Nominated	
Seoul Music Awards	2022	U+Idol Live Best Artist Award	STAYC	Nominated	

=== State and cultural honors ===
Name of country or organization, year given, and name of honor
Country or organization	Year	Honor	Ref.
Newsis K-Expo Cultural Awards (Note: Co-sponsored by Korea's Ministry of Culture, Sports and Tourism, Ministry of Trade, Industry, and Energy, Korea Communications Commission, and Korea Creative Content Agency, it awards cultural icons and businesses that promote the sustainability of the Korean Wave and boost the industry's competitiveness.)	2025	Seoul Metropolitan Council Chairman's Award	

=== Listicles ===
Name of publisher, year listed, name of listicle, and placement
Publisher	Year	Listicle	Placement	Ref.
Forbes	2021	Korea Power Celebrity 40 (Rising Star)	Placed	
