= We Need Love =

- Digital and "Love" version cover

Single album by STAYC
- Released: July 19, 2022
- Length: 12:15
- Language: Korean
- Label: High Up; Kakao
- Producer: Black Eyed Pilseung; Jeon Goon; Flyt; Tak

STAYC chronology
| Young-Luv.com (2022) | We Need Love (2022) | Teddy Bear (2023) |

Singles from We Need Love
- 1. "Beautiful Monster" Released: July 19, 2022

We Need Love is the third single album by South Korean girl group STAYC. It was released by High Up Entertainment on July 19, 2022, and contains four tracks, including the lead single "Beautiful Monster".

== Background and release ==
On June 30, 2022, High Up Entertainment announced STAYC will be releasing a new album in July 2022. A day later, it was announced STAYC would be releasing their third single album titled We Need Love on July 19. On July 5, the album teaser video was released, followed by the promotional schedule a day later. On July 15, the highlight medley video was released with "Beautiful Monster" announced as the lead single. Three days later, the music video teaser for "Beautiful Monster" was released.

== Reception ==
Professional ratings
Review scores
| Source | Rating |
|---|---|
| NME | 3/5 stars |

Tanu I. Raj of NME stated that "We Need Love played safe leaving much to be desired as a whole" as the single album "is missing the experimental streak STAYC have become synonymous with [and] the complexity in the story they [have] build". Overall, he stated that "We Need Love is a fitting summer album in the sense that the memories won't linger till the next [season]".

== Promotion ==
Prior to the single album's release, STAYC held a live showcase to introduce the single album and communicate with their fans.

== Track listing ==
All lyrics are written by Black Eyed Pilseung and Jeon Goon.

We Need Love track listing
| No. | Title | Music | Arrangement | Length |
|---|---|---|---|---|
| 1. | "Beautiful Monster" | Black Eyed Pilseung; Flyt | Rado; Flyt | 3:00 |
| 2. | "I Like It" | Black Eyed Pilseung; Jeon Goon | Rado | 2:38 |
| 3. | "Love" | Black Eyed Pilseung; Flyt | Flyt | 3:06 |
| 4. | "Run2U" (Tak remix) | Black Eyed Pilseung; Jeon Goon; Flyt | Tak | 3:31 |
| Total length: | | | | 12:15 |

== Credits and personnel ==
Credits adapted from single album's liner notes.

Studios

- Ingrid Studio – recording, digital editing (all tracks)
- Vanguard Town – digital editing (track 1–2)
- Koko Sound Studio – mixing (all tracks)
- The Mastering Palace – mastering (track 1, 4)
- Metropolis Mastering Studios – mastering (track 2–3)

Personnel

- STAYC – lead vocals, background vocals (all tracks)
  - Sieun – background vocals (track 4)
- Ashley Alisha – background vocals (track 1–3)
- Flyt – background vocals (track 4), arrangement (track 1, 3), bass (track 1, 3), drums (track 3), keyboard (track 3), production (track 1, 3–4)
- Black Eyed Pilseung – lyrics, composition, production (all tracks)
- Jeon Goon – lyrics, composition, production (all tracks)
- Rado – arrangement (track 1), drums (track 1–2), keyboard (track 2), guitar (track 2), digital editing (track 1–2)
- Tak – drums, keyboard, bass (track 4)
- Jeong Eun-kyung – recording, digital editing (all tracks)
- Yang Young-eun – recording (track 1)
- Drk – mixing (all tracks)
- Kim Jun-sang – assistant mixing (all tracks)
- Ji Min-woo – assistant mixing (all tracks)
- On Seong-yoon – assistant mixing (all tracks)
- Kim Joon-young – assistant mixing (all tracks)
- Dave Kutch – mastering (track 1, 4)
- Stuart Hawkes – mastering (track 2–3)

== Charts ==
=== Weekly charts ===
Chart performance for We Need Love
| Chart (2022) | Peak position |
|---|---|
| South Korean Albums (Circle) | 2 |

=== Monthly charts ===
Monthly chart performance for We Need Love
| Chart (2022) | Peak position |
|---|---|
| South Korean Albums (Circle) | 10 |

=== Year-end chart ===
Year-end chart performance for We Need Love
| Chart (2022) | Peak position |
|---|---|
| South Korea Albums (Circle) | 53 |

== Certifications and sales ==
Certifications and sales for We Need Love
| Region | Certification | Certified units/sales |
|---|---|---|
| South Korea (KMCA) | Platinum | 261,827 |

== Release history ==
Release history for We Need Love
| Region | Date | Format | Label |
|---|---|---|---|
| South Korea | July 19, 2022 | CD | High Up; Kakao |
| Various | July 19, 2022 | Digital download; streaming | High Up; Kakao |
