= Percent (EP) =

EP by Apink
- Released: January 7, 2019
- Recorded: 2019
- Genre: K-pop; dance-pop
- Length: 21:37
- Label: Play M

Apink chronology
One & Six (2018)	Percent (2019)	Look (2020)

Singles from Percent
- 1. "%% (Eung Eung)" Released: January 7, 2019

Percent is the eighth extended play by South Korean girl group Apink, released by Play M Entertainment on January 7, 2019. The EP features six tracks, with "%% (Eung Eung)" serving as the title track.

== Track listing ==
Percent track listing
No.	Title	Lyrics	Music	Arrangement	Length
1.	"%% (Eung Eung)" (응응)	Black Eyed Pilseung, Jun Goon	Black Eyed Pilseung, Jun Goon	Rado	3:28
2.	"Hug Me" (안아줘요)	MosPick	MosPick	MosPick	3:30
3.	"What Are You Doing?" (느낌적인 느낌)	1Take, TAK	1Take, TAK	1Take, TAK	3:39
4.	"Push & Pull" (줄다리기)	Jung Jo Hyun	Jung Jo Hyun	Jung Jo Hyun	3:26
5.	"Enough"	Park Chorong	Wiidope, Kofi Owusu-Ofori, Nikel	Wiidope	3:27
6.	"Memories" (기억 더하기)	1Take, TAK	1Take, TAK	1Take, TAK	4:07
Total length:					21:37

== Composition ==
Billboard's Tamar Herman defines the title track "%% (Eung Eung)" as a lush, ‘80s-influenced dance track.

== Awards and nominations ==
Music program wins
Song	Program	Date	Ref.
"%% (Eung Eung)"	Show Champion	January 16, 2019	
"%% (Eung Eung)"	M Countdown	January 17, 2019	
"%% (Eung Eung)"	Inkigayo	January 20, 2019	

== Accolades ==
Year-end lists
Publisher	Year	Listicle	Work	Rank	Ref.
Billboard	2019	Best K-Pop Songs of 2020	"%% (Eung-Eung)"	2	
Dazed	2019	The 20 Best K-Pop Songs of 2019	"%% (Eung-Eung)"	11	

== Commercial performance ==
The EP debuted at number three on the Gaon Album Chart in South Korea.

== Charts ==
Sales chart performance for Percent
Chart (2019)	Peak position
South Korean Albums (Gaon)	3
US World Albums (Billboard)	14

Sales and streaming chart performance for "%% (Eung Eung)"
Chart (2019)	Peak position
South Korea (Gaon)	17
South Korea (K-pop Hot 100)	14
US World Digital Songs (Billboard)	8
