= Black Eyed Pilseung =

South Korean producer duo

Black Eyed Pilseung 블랙아이드필승
- Also known as: Black Eyed Victory
- Origin: South Korea
- Genre: K-pop
- Years active: 2014–2025
- Label: High Up Entertainment
- Past members: Rado (Song Joo-young); Choi Kyu-sung
- Website: highup-ent.com/en/bep

Black Eyed Pilseung (Korean: 블랙아이드필승; lit. '"Black Eyed Victory"') were a South Korean music production and songwriting duo made up of Rado (Song Joo-young) and Choi Kyu-sung, formed in 2014. They produced hit K-pop songs such as Sistar's "Touch My Body"; Miss A's "Only You"; Twice's "Like Ooh-Ahh", "Cheer Up", "TT", "Likey", and "Fancy"; and Apink's "I'm So Sick", "Eung Eung", and "Dumhdurum".

Before the duo's formation, both members often collaborated with Shinsadong Tiger. Rado worked on hit songs such as 4Minute's "Volume Up", Apink's "My My" and "Hush", and Trouble Maker's "Trouble Maker" and "Now", while Choi Kyu-sung was involved in T-ara's "Roly-Poly", Hyuna's "Bubble Pop", and Beast's "Fiction".

In August 2017, the duo joined forces with CJ E&M to launch a new entertainment company called High Up Entertainment, which became an independent company in 2018. In February 2019, the duo debuted their first boy duo 415 (Korean: 사이로). In November 2020, the duo debuted their first girl group STAYC (Korean: 스테이씨). In March 2025, Rado and Choi Kyu-sung parted ways due to differing musical styles, with Choi leaving High Up Entertainment.

== Members ==
=== Rado ===
Rado (Korean: 라도; born Song Joo-young [송주영; Song Juyeong]) was born on July 11, 1984. Prior to being a songwriter and music producer, he was a member of the now-defunct boy band Someday. He was also known for collaborating with rapper Dok2, starting with the 2010 EP album It's We and songs "Girl Girl" (together with The Quiett, from Thunderground Mixtape Vol. 2) and "Baby Let's Go" (together with The Quiett and B-Free, from Rapsolute Mixtape, Vol. 1), then the 2011 songs "Break Beatz" (together with Double K, from Flow 2 Flow), "That's Me" (from Hustle Real Hard) and "Come Closer/Flow2nite" (together with The Quiett, also from Hustle Real Hard), and the 2012 song "Love & Life" (from Love & Life, The Album).

Rado married Apink member Yoon Bo-mi in May 2026. The pair met in 2016 when Rado was producing Apink's "Only One" track and started dating in 2017.

=== Choi Kyu-sung ===
Choi Kyu-sung (Korean: 최규성; Choe Gyuseong) was born on May 7, 1984, in Seoul.

== Production discography ==
=== 2014 ===
Artist	Song	Album
Sistar	"Touch My Body"	Touch N Move
Sistar	"Wow"	Touch N Move
Teen Top	"Missing" (쉽지않아)	Éxito
Teen Top	"Alone" (혼자 사니)	Éxito
Teen Top	"Cry" (울어)	Éxito
Teen Top	"I'm Sorry" (우린 문제 없어)	Éxito
Hyolyn and Jooyoung	"Erase" (지워) (feat. Iron)	Non-album single

=== 2015 ===
Artist	Song	Album
Niel	"Only You"	ONiely
Niel	"Lovekiller" (못된 여자) (feat. Dok2)	ONiely
Niel	"Lady" (feat. L.Joe)	ONiely
Miss A	"Only You" (다른 남자 말고 너)	Colors
Shannon Williams	"Why Why" (왜요 왜요)	Eighteen
Jang Hyun-seung	"It's Me"	My
Jang Hyun-seung	"Ma First" (니가 처음이야) (feat. Giriboy)	My
Jang Hyun-seung	"Breakup With Him" (걔랑 헤어져) (feat. Dok2)	My
Jang Hyun-seung	"I Said I Love You" (사랑한다고)	My
Teen Top	"Hot Like Fire"	Natural Born Teen Top
Teen Top	"Ah-Ah" (아침부터 아침까지)	Natural Born Teen Top
Teen Top	"Confusing" ( 헷갈려)	Natural Born Teen Top
Got7	"If You Do" (니가 하면)	Mad
Twice	"Like Ooh-Ahh" (OOH-AHH하게)	The Story Begins

=== 2016 ===
Artist	Song	Album
AOA Cream	"I'm Jelly Baby" (질투 나요 BABY)	Non-album single
Twice	"Cheer Up"	Page Two
Twice	"TT"	Twicecoaster: Lane 1
Babylon	"Between Us" (너 나 우리) (feat. Dok2)	Between Us
Sistar	"I Like That"	Insane Love
BtoB Blue	"Stand By Me" (내 곁어 서 있어줘)	Non-album single
Apink	"Only One" (내가 설렐 수 있게)	Pink Revolution
Apink	"Only One" (내가 설렐 수 있게) (R&B Ver.)	Dear

=== 2017 ===
Artist	Song	Album
WJSN	"Happy"	Happy Moment
Sistar	"Lonely"	Non-album singles
Idol School	"Cause You're Pretty" (예쁘니까)	Non-album singles
Davichi	"To Me" (나에게 넌)	Non-album singles
Twice	"Likey"	Twicetagram

=== 2018 ===
Artist	Song	Album
Chung Ha	"Roller Coaster"	Offset
KHAN	"I'm Your Girl?"	Non-album single
Apink	"I'm So Sick" (1도없어)	One & Six
Hyolyn	"See Sea" (바다보러갈래)	Say My Name

=== 2019 ===
Artist	Song	Album
Chung Ha	"Gotta Go" (벌써 12시)	XII
Apink	"%%" (Eung Eung(응응))	Percent
Twice	"Fancy"	Fancy You
Ruann	"Beep Beep"	Non-album single

=== 2020 ===
Artist	Song	Album
Apink	"Dumhdurum"	Look
415	"No Wish No More" (소원이 없겠다) (feat. nafla)	Non-album singles
Refund Sisters	"Don't Touch Me"	Non-album singles
STAYC	"So Bad"	Star to a Young Culture
STAYC	"Like This"	Star to a Young Culture

=== 2021 ===
Artist	Song	Album
STAYC	"ASAP"	Staydom
STAYC	"So What"	Staydom
STAYC	"Love Fool" (사랑은 원래 이렇게 아픈 건가요)	Staydom
STAYC	"Stereotype" (색안경)	Stereotype
STAYC	"I'll Be There"	Stereotype
STAYC	"Slow Down"	Stereotype
STAYC	"Complex"	Stereotype
415	"Summer Nostalgia" (그저 안녕)	Non-album singles
Toyote (Yoo Jae-suk, Haha, Mijoo)	"Still I Love You"	Non-album singles

=== 2022 ===
Artist	Song	Album
Apink	"Dilemma"	Horn
STAYC	"Run2U"	Young-Luv.com
STAYC	"Same Same"	Young-Luv.com
STAYC	"Young Luv"	Young-Luv.com
STAYC	"Beautiful Monster"	We Need Love
STAYC	"I Like It"	We Need Love
STAYC	"Love"	We Need Love
STAYC	"Poppy"	Non-album single

=== 2023 ===
Artist	Song	Album
Itzy	"Cake"	Kill My Doubt
STAYC	"Teddy Bear"	Teddy Bear
STAYC	"Poppy" (Korean ver.)	Teddy Bear
STAYC	"Bubble"	Teenfresh
STAYC	"Not Like You"	Teenfresh
STAYC	"Bubble" (English version)	Teenfresh
STAYC	"Lit"	Non-album single

=== 2024 ===
Artist	Song	Album
STAYC	"Twenty"	Metamorphic
STAYC	"Cheeky Icy Thang"	Metamorphic
STAYC	"1 Thing"	Metamorphic
STAYC	"Give It 2 Me"	Metamorphic
STAYC	"Find" (Sung by Sieun, Seeun, and J)	Metamorphic
STAYC	"Let Me Know"	Metamorphic
STAYC	"Fakin'" (Sung by Sumin and Yoon)	Metamorphic
STAYC	"Roses" (Sung by Isa)	Metamorphic
STAYC	"Flexing on My Ex"	Metamorphic
STAYC	"GPT"	...l
Chung Ha	"Algorithm" (알고리즘)	Non-album single

== Awards and nominations ==
=== Gaon Chart K-Pop Awards ===
Year	Nominee / work	Award	Result
2015	Black Eyed Pilseung	Composer of the Year	Won
2016	Black Eyed Pilseung	Composer of the Year	Won
2019	Black Eyed Pilseung	Composer of the Year	Won

=== Mnet Asian Music Awards ===
Year	Nominee / work	Award	Result
2016	Black Eyed Pilseung	Best Producer of the Year	Won
