= Stereotype (STAYC song) =

Single by STAYC

from the EP Stereotype
- Language: Korean
- Released: September 6, 2021
- Genre: Future bass
- Length: 3:11
- Label: High Up Entertainment; Kakao
- Songwriters: Black Eyed Pilseung; Jeon Goon
- Producer: Black Eyed Pilseung

STAYC singles chronology
"ASAP" (2021)	"Stereotype" (2021)	"Run2U" (2022)

Music video
- "Stereotype" on YouTube

"Stereotype" (Korean: 색안경, saeg-angyeong; stylized in all-caps) is a song recorded by South Korean girl group STAYC from their first Korean extended play (EP) of the same name. It was released as the lead single on September 6, 2021, by High Up Entertainment. The song was written and composed by Black Eyed Pilseung and Jeon Goon, and arranged by Rado.

== Background and release ==
On August 4, 2021, High Up Entertainment confirmed through Newsen that STAYC was preparing for a comeback. On August 16, it was announced that STAYC would be releasing their first extended play titled Stereotype on September 6. On August 30, a highlight medley teaser video was released with "Stereotype" announced as the lead single. On August 31, the song producer Black Eyed Pilseung revealed in an interview that "Stereotype" was first written and composed prior to STAYC's debut, but was not chosen as their debut song due to the lyrics and the message the song delivers. On September 2, the teaser video showing portion of the song's choreography was released. On September 4, a portion of the song at 30 seconds long was pre-released on TikTok for TikTok challenge. On September 5, the teaser for the music video was released. The song along with the music video was released on September 6.

== Composition ==
"Stereotype" was written and composed by Black Eyed Pilseung and Jeon Goon, and arranged by Rado. Musically, the song is described by NME as "future bass with flute-like synths". "Stereotype" was composed in the key of F-sharp major, with a tempo of 148 beats per minute.

== Commercial performance ==
"Stereotype" debuted at position 27 on South Korea's Gaon Digital Chart in the chart issue dated September 5–11, 2021. The song debuted at position 68 and 16 on Billboard K-pop Hot 100 and World Digital Songs, respectively, in the chart issue dated September 18, 2021. The song then ascended to position 17 on K-pop Hot 100 in the chart issue dated October 23, 2021. The song debuted at position 25 on Singapore's RIAS Top Streaming Chart in the chart issue dated September 10–16, 2021. The song also debuted at position 20 on RIAS Top Regional Chart in the chart issue dated September 3–9, 2021. The song then ascended to position 22 and 7 on RIAS Top Streaming Chart and RIAS Top Regional Chart, respectively, in the chart issue dated September 17–23, 2021.

== Promotion ==
Prior to the extended play's release, on September 6, 2021, STAYC held a live event called "STAYC The 1st Mini Album [STEREOTYPE] Showcase" on V Live to introduce their EP and its song including "Stereotype". Following the release of the extended play, the group performed "Stereotype" on four music programs: KBS2's Music Bank on September 10, MBC's Show! Music Core on September 11, SBS's Inkigayo on September 12, and SBS MTV's The Show on September 14 where they won the first place. The group also performed the song on You Hee-yeol's Sketchbook on September 11. On the second week of the song release, the group performed on MBC M's Show Champion on September 15, and Mnet's M Countdown on September 16, where they won first place in both appearances.

== Credits and personnel ==
Credits adapted from Melon.

Studio

- Ingrid Studio – recording, digital editing
- Koko Sound Studio – mixing
- Sterling Sound – mastering

Personnel

- STAYC – vocals, background vocals
- Black Eyed Pilseung – lyrics, composition
- Jeon Goon – lyrics, composition
- Rado – arrangement, bass, keyboard
- Jung Eun-kyung – recording, digital editing
- Kim Su-jeong – recording
- Go Hyeon-jeong – mixing
- Kim Jun–sang – mixing (assistant)
- Jeongg Yeong-woon – mixing (assistant)
- Ji Min-woo – mixing (assistant)
- Chris Gehringer – mastering

== Accolades ==
Music program awards
Program	Date	Ref.
The Show	September 14, 2021	
Show Champion	September 15, 2021	
M Countdown	September 16, 2021	

"Stereotype" on listicles
Publisher	Year	Listicle	Rank	Ref.
NME	2021	The 25 best K-pop songs of 2021	5th	
SCMP	2021	The 20 best K-pop songs of 2021	2nd	

== Charts ==
=== Weekly charts ===
Weekly chart performance for "Stereotype"
Chart (2021)	Peak position
Singapore (RIAS)	22
South Korea (Gaon)	27
South Korea (K-pop Hot 100)	17
US World Digital Songs (Billboard)	16

=== Monthly charts ===
Monthly chart performance for "Stereotype"
Chart (2021)	Peak position
South Korea (Gaon)	31
South Korea (K-pop Hot 100)	17

=== Year-end charts ===
Year-end chart performance for "Stereotype"
Chart (2021)	Position
South Korea (Gaon)	163

== Release history ==
Release history for "Stereotype"
Region	Date	Format	Label	Ref.
Various	September 6, 2021	Digital download; streaming	High Up Entertainment; Kakao	
