= Teenfresh =

- Digital cover

EP by STAYC
- Released: August 16, 2023
- Genre: K-pop
- Length: 17:04
- Language: Korean
- Labels: High Up; Kakao

STAYC chronology
Teddy Bear (2023)	Teenfresh (2023)	Metamorphic (2024)

Singles from Teenfresh
- 1. "Bubble" Released: August 16, 2023

Professional ratings
Review scores
Source	Rating
NME	3/5 stars

Teenfresh is the third extended play by South Korean girl group STAYC. It was released by High Up Entertainment on August 16, 2023, and contains six tracks, including the lead single "Bubble".

== Background and release ==
On July 24, 2023, High Up Entertainment announced STAYC would be releasing their third extended play titled Teenfresh on August 16. A day later, the promotional schedule was released. It was also announced that "Bubble" would serve as the lead single. On August 9, the first music video teaser for "Bubble" was released. Five days later, the highlight medley teaser video was released. On August 15, the second music video teaser for "Bubble" was released. The extended play was released alongside the music video for "Bubble" on August 16.

== Composition ==
Teenfresh contain six tracks. The lead single "Bubble" was described as a bubblegum pop song with lyrics having the message that "we tend to trap ourselves in the bubbles of criticism and unrealistic expectations". The second track, "Not Like You", was described as a hip hop song with lyrics about "the liberation that self-love and confidence brings". The third track, "I Wanna Do", was described as a "mid-tempo" R&B song with lyrics that "growing up may be hard, unforgiving, cruel and lonely, but one will always find a home in companionship". The fourth track, "Be Mine", was described as a "Y2K-inspired" R&B song.

== Commercial performance ==
Teenfresh debuted at number three on South Korea's Circle Album Chart in the chart issue dated August 13–19, 2023.

== Promotion ==
Prior to the release of Teenfresh, on August 16, 2023, the group held a live event to introduce the extended play and its songs, and to communicate with their fans. The group are also scheduled to hold their first concert tour titled Teenfresh as part of the extended play's promotion from September 23, 2023, to February 16, 2024.

== Track listing ==
Track listing for Teenfresh
No.	Title	Lyrics	Music	Arrangement	Length
1.	"Bubble"	B.E.P; Jeon Goon	B.E.P; Flyt	Rado; Flyt	2:59
2.	"Not Like You"	B.E.P; Jeon Goon	B.E.P; Will.B	Rado	2:49
3.	"I Wanna Do"	Will.B; Van.Gogh	Will.B	Will.B	2:54
4.	"Be Mine"	BXN	BXN; Prime Time	BXN; Prime Time	2:46
5.	"Bubble" (English version)	Illson; Sean Rhee; B.E.P; Jeon Goon	B.E.P; Flyt	Rado; Flyt	2:59
6.	"Bubble" (sped up; English version)	Illson; Sean Rhee; B.E.P; Jeon Goon	B.E.P; Flyt	Rado; Flyt	2:37
Total length:					17:04

== Charts ==
=== Weekly charts ===
Weekly chart performance for Teenfresh
Chart (2023)	Peak position
Japanese Albums (Oricon)	45
South Korean Albums (Circle)	3
US Top Album Sales (Billboard)	40
US World Albums (Billboard)	14

=== Monthly charts ===
Monthly chart performance for Teenfresh
Chart (2023)	Position
South Korean Albums (Circle)	7

=== Year-end charts ===
Year-end chart performance for Teenfresh
Chart (2023)	Position
South Korean Albums (Circle)	69

== Certifications ==
Certifications for Teenfresh
Region	Certification	Certified units/sales
South Korea (KMCA)	Platinum	250,000^{^}
^{^} Shipments figures based on certification alone.

== Release history ==
Release history for Teenfresh
Region	Date	Format	Label
Various	August 16, 2023	Digital download; streaming	High Up; Kakao
South Korea	August 16, 2023	CD	High Up; Kakao
United States	August 18, 2023	CD	High Up
