= Look (EP) =

EP by Apink
- Released: April 13, 2020
- Recorded: 2019–2020
- Genres: K-pop; dance; R&B
- Length: 24:00
- Label: Play M

Apink chronology
Percent (2019)	Look (2020)	Horn (2022)

Singles from Look
- 1. "Dumhdurum" Released: April 13, 2020

Look is the ninth extended play (EP) by South Korean girl group Apink. It was released by Play M Entertainment on April 13, 2020, one year and three months after their last EP Percent (2019), the group's longest break since debut. The album contains seven songs including the lead single "Dumhdurum".

== Release and promotion ==
On April 1, 2020, Play M Entertainment announced the upcoming release of Apink's ninth extended play Look and lead single "Dumhdurum" on April 13. It marks the group's first release after one year and three months following their previous mini-album Percent (2019). A schedule for the comeback was posted via the group's SNS accounts, containing multiple dates for the release of teasers for the album. The first group teaser was released on April 2. On April 3, unit group teasers were released in two versions- 'YOS' and 'Ju-ji-rong. The full album tracklist was released on April 6. The EP consists of seven songs including two new tracks for fans. Preorders for the album began the same day. From April 7 to April 9, solo teasers for each member were released in sets of two. On April 10, a highlight medley video featuring previews of the songs from the album was released. A few hours ahead of the album release, a 50-second teaser of the performance version of the music video was released. The album was released on April 13, in both CD and digital formats. An accompanying music video for the lead single "Dumhdurum" was released in conjunction with the release of the album.

Hours after the album release, the group held an online showcase which was broadcast live via Naver's V Live app. The group performed songs from the album for the first time at the showcase. The group then promoted the album on music shows, starting with KBS's Music Bank on April 17, where they performed "Be Myself", "Love Is Blind" and "Dumhdurum". In the second week of promotion, Apink won all six music show awards on, The Show, Show Champion, M Countdown, Music Bank, Show! Music Core and Inkigayo. They won a total of 8 music show awards including consecutive wins on Show! Music Core and Inkigayo.

== Composition ==
The album's lead single "Dumhdurum" has lyrics written by Jeon Gun and Black Eyed Pilseung, the same team who wrote Apink's previous hit singles "I'm So Sick" and "Eung Eung". It is a dance-driven number with an "addictive hook" and features a Spanish yet "Oriental" melody and synth sounds. The lyrics talk about accepting a broken relationship calmly. "Yummy" is a dance song with elements of R&B and features minimalist instrumentation and a "stylish" melody. "Be Myself" is a pop and R&B song featuring flute and keyboards. It is performed by Eunji, Cho-rong and Namjoo. "Love Is Blind" is a unit track performed by Bo-mi, Na-eun, and Ha-young and has lyrics written by Kim Yeonseo and music by MinGtion. It features a drum rhythm and derives from synthesizer and bass instrumentation. "Overwrite" is an R&B ballad with a restrained rhythm. It was written and produced by Dr.JO. The last two tracks of the album are released to mark their 9th anniversary and are both dedicated to their fans. "Moments" is a pop ballad with a "dramatic" melody. "Everybody Ready?" is an uptempo dance-pop-style song produced by Jinhwan Kim. It features a funk-based rhythm, "clapping beats", "brass-horns" and "energetic vocals". The lyrics are a celebration of their career.

== Reception ==
The album debuted at number two on the Gaon Album Chart while "Dumhdurum" topped the Gaon Download Chart. "Dumhdurum" entered the Gaon Digital Chart at number four and peaked at number two in its second week. As of June 2020, Look has sold 47,937 physical copies.

== Track listing ==
Look track listing
No.	Title	Lyrics	Music	Arrangement	Length
1.	"Dumhdurum"	Black Eyed Pilseung, Jun Goon	Black Eyed Pilseung, Jun Goon	Rado	3:28
2.	"Yummy"	Jinri, Long Candy, Duble Sidekick	Jinri, Long Candy, Duble Sidekick, Glory Face	Glory Face	3:49
3.	"Be Myself" (Apink JJR – Namjoo, Eunji and Chorong)	Kim Yeon Seo	Kim Yeon Seo, minGtion	minGtion	3:26
4.	"Love is Blind" (Apink Y.O.S – Bomi, Hayoung and Naeun)	Kim Yeon Seo	Kim Yeon Seo, minGtion	minGtion	3:56
5.	"Overwrite"	Dr.JO	Dr.JO	Dr.JO	3:17
6.	"Moment 너의 모든 순간을 사랑해"	Park Chorong	BOOMBASTIC	BOOMBASTIC	3:50
7.	"Everybody Ready?" (9th Anniversary Special Single)	Jung Eun-ji, Kim Jin Hwan	Kim Jin Hwan	Kim Jin Hwan	3:22
Total length:					24:08

== Awards and nominations ==
Music program wins
Song	Program	Date	Ref.
"Dumhdurum"	The Show	April 21, 2020	
"Dumhdurum"	Show Champion	April 22, 2020	
"Dumhdurum"	M Countdown	April 23, 2020	
"Dumhdurum"	Music Bank	April 24, 2020	
"Dumhdurum"	Show! Music Core	April 25, 2020	
"Dumhdurum"	Show! Music Core	May 2, 2020	
"Dumhdurum"	Inkigayo	April 26, 2020	
"Dumhdurum"	Inkigayo	May 3, 2020	

== Accolades ==
Year-end lists
Publisher	Year	Listicle	Work	Rank	Ref.
Billboard	2020	Best K-Pop Songs of 2020	"Dumhdurum"	2	
BuzzFeed	2020	Best K-Pop Songs of 2020	"Dumhdurum"	23	
Dazed	2020	Top 40 Best K-Pop Song of 2020	"Dumhdurum"	22	
Paper	2020	The 40 Best K-Pop Songs of 2020	"Dumhdurum"	—N/a	
Time	2020	The Best K-Pop Songs and Albums of 2020	"Dumhdurum"	—N/a	

== Charts ==
Sales chart performance for Look
Chart (2020)	Peak position
South Korean Albums (Gaon)	2

Sales and streaming chart performance for "Dumhdurum"
Song	Chart (2020)	Peak position
Dumhdurum	South Korea (Gaon)	2
Dumhdurum	South Korea (K-pop Hot 100)	2
Dumhdurum	US World Digital Songs (Billboard)	10

== Release history ==
Region	Date	Format	Label	Ref.
Various	April 13, 2020	CD; Digital download; streaming	Play M Entertainment; Kakao M	
