= Star to a Young Culture =

- Digital cover

Single album by STAYC
- Released: November 12, 2020
- Genres: Electropop; dance-pop
- Length: 6:38
- Language: Korean
- Label: High Up Entertainment
- Producer: Black Eyed Pilseung

STAYC chronology
| Star to a Young Culture (2020) | Staydom (2021) |

Singles from Star to a Young Culture
- 1. "So Bad" Released: November 12, 2020

Star to a Young Culture is the debut single album by South Korean girl group STAYC. It was released on November 12, 2020, by High Up Entertainment and distributed by Kakao M. The EP consists of two tracks both produced by Black Eyed Pilseung.

== Background and promotion ==
On October 11, High Up Entertainment announced that their first ever girl group "STAYC" would be debuting on November 12, 2020. All members of the group were announced between September 8 and October 22. The title of their single album was announced to be Star To A Young Culture, with the lead single "So Bad". The teaser schedule was released the same day. The album was announced to be produced by Black Eyed Pilseung and the duo described the group's sound as "Teen Fresh", a combination of "Teen" and "Fresh", highlighting the group's "unique individual vocal colors".

To promote the album the group performed their lead single "So Bad" and B-side "Like This" through a VLIVE debut showcase. The group made their music show debut on November 13, 2020, at KBS Music Bank, which was followed up with performances at Show Champion, Inkigayo, and The Show.

== Singles ==
"So Bad" was released as the lead single and title alongside the EP on November 12, 2020. The music video for the song received over 2.6 million views in the first 24 hours. The song debuted at number 90 on Billboard's K-pop Hot 100 later peaking at number 82, and number 21 on the World Digital Song Sales chart. The song also peaked at number 159 on the Korean Gaon Digital Chart.

== Commercial performance ==
The EP sold over 4,300 copies on its first day, the most for a girl group that made their debut in 2020. It went on to sell more than 10,000 copies on its first week, becoming the first debut album by a girl group in 2020 to do so. After debuting at number 17 the EP went on to peak at number 6 on the Korean Gaon Album Chart. The group also managed to get more than 30 thousand streams and more than 10 thousand unique listeners on Genie Music.

== Track listing ==
All tracks are written by Black Eyed Pilseung and Jeon Goon, and arranged by Rado.

Star to a Young Culture track listing
| No. | Title | Length |
|---|---|---|
| 1. | "So Bad" | 3:32 |
| 2. | "Like This" | 3:06 |
| Total length: | | 6:38 |

== Accolades ==
Year-end lists
| Critic/Publication | List | Work | Rank | Ref. |
|---|---|---|---|---|
| MTV | The Best K-Pop B-Sides of 2020 | "Like This" | 3 | |

== Charts ==
Chart performance for Star to a Young Culture
| Chart (2020) | Peak position |
|---|---|
| South Korean Albums (Gaon) | 6 |

== Certification and sales ==
Sales for Star to a Young Culture
| Region | Certification | Certified units/sales |
|---|---|---|
| South Korea | — | 48,439 |

== Release history ==
Release history for Star to a Young Culture
| Region | Date | Format | Label |
|---|---|---|---|
| Various | November 12, 2020 | Digital download; streaming | High Up Entertainment |
| South Korea | November 13, 2020 | CD | High Up Entertainment |
