= Staydom =

- Digital cover

Single album by STAYC
- Released: April 8, 2021
- Length: 12:56
- Language: Korean
- Label: High Up; Kakao
- Producer: Black Eyed Pilseung; Jeon Goon

STAYC chronology
Star to a Young Culture (2020)	Staydom (2021)	Stereotype (2021)

Singles from Staydom
- 1. "ASAP" Released: April 8, 2021

Staydom (stylized in all caps) is the second Korean-language single album by South Korean girl group STAYC, released almost five months after the group's debut. It was released on April 8, 2021, by High Up Entertainment and distributed by Kakao Entertainment.

== Background ==
High Up Entertainment announced on March 24, 2021, that STAYC would be having their first comeback on April 8 with their second single album.

The group will return with a concept highlighting the upgraded music and vibrant charms of the members

— High Up Entertainment announcing the group's new album

Two teasers for the album were posted on the group's social media accounts on March 23 and 24. The first teaser opens with the phrase "I hope someone to show up as soon as possible" with a tight shot of members' lips. Simultaneously, a mysterious voice messages came out in both Korean and English. The second teaser displayed the particular voice messages in texts, unveiling the release date and the album's name in the last scene. The album's track list was revealed on March 26 and "ASAP" was announced as the lead single. The album contains three new original songs and a remix of their debut single "So Bad".

Concept photos for the album were released in the following days. The final teaser for the music video for "ASAP" was released on April 7. In the teaser clip, the six members rock different vibrant hair colours and dance on a pastel film set. "I think I'm really cool" member Yoon says to the camera before the beat kicks in.

== Composition ==
The production on the album is more mellowed and stripped-down compared to that on their debut single album. The lead single "ASAP" was noted to be considerably "low-key" compared to its predecessor. The instrumental hook of the song is laid-back, with its twinkly 8-bit-inspired ringtone melody. The song is trapped between a cutesy bubblegum pop production and a sensual summer jam. "Love Fool" is described as a delicate and cruisy song where the group members aren't forced to sing outside of their comfort zone, instead, they're allowed to bring their distinct persona to the song. "So What" is a bouncy pop song with some auto-tune. The last track on the album is an unplugged remix of their debut single "So Bad" titled "So Bad (Tak remix)". It is a dark pop song with influences of EDM and hip hop. Black Eyed Pilseung co-produced "ASAP" and "So What" with Jeon Goon and solely produced "Love Fool". Production credits for "So Bad (Tak remix)" were not revealed.

== Critical reception ==
Professional ratings
Review scores
Source	Rating
NME	4/5 stars

NME's Sofiana Ramli called the album a "low-key, summer-ready comeback" that manages to hit all the right notes. She noted how the album showcased the group members' range, showing us that they're also equally great in a more stripped-down setting as they are in delivering dance-pop bangers.

== Commercial performance ==
The album debuted at number nine on the Gaon Album Chart becoming the group's highest debut on the chart and their second consecutive top ten album. The single "ASAP" has peaked in number 9 on Gaon Digital Chart as of 6 June 2021.

== Track listing ==
Staydom track listing
No.	Title	Producer(s)	Length
1.	"ASAP"	Black Eyed Pilseung; Jeon Goon	3:13
2.	"So What"	Black Eyed Pilseung; Jeon Goon	2:58
3.	"Love Fool" (사랑은 원래 이렇게 아픈 건가요)	Black Eyed Pilseung	3:38
4.	"So Bad (Tak Remix)"	Black Eyed Pilseung; Jeon Goon; Tak	3:05
Total length:			12:56

== Charts ==
Chart performance for Staydom
Chart (2021)	Peak position
South Korean Albums (Gaon)	9

== Certification and sales ==
Sales for Staydom
Region	Certification	Certified units/sales
South Korea	—	85,858

== Release history ==
Release history for Staydom
Region	Date	Format	Label
Various	April 8, 2021	Digital download; streaming	High Up Entertainment
