= ASAP (STAYC song) =

Single by STAYC

from the EP Staydom
- Language: Korean
- Released: April 8, 2021
- Genre: Bubblegum pop
- Length: 3:13
- Label: High Up Entertainment; Kakao
- Songwriters: Black Eyed Pilseung; Jeon Goon
- Producer: Black Eyed Pilseung

STAYC singles chronology
"So Bad" (2020)	"ASAP" (2021)	"Stereotype" (2021)

Music video
- "ASAP" on YouTube

"ASAP" is a song recorded by South Korean girl group STAYC for their second single album Staydom. It was released as the lead single on April 8, 2021, by High Up Entertainment. The song was written and composed by Black Eyed Pilseung and Jeon Goon, and arranged by Rado.

== Background and release ==
On March 24, 2021, High Up Entertainment announced that STAYC would be releasing their second single album titled Staydom on April 8. On March 25, the promotional schedule was released. On March 27, the track listing for the single album was released with "ASAP" announced as the lead single. On April 2, a highlight medley teaser video was released. On April 6, the teaser video showing portion of the song choreography was released. On April 7, the teaser for the music video was released. The song along with the music video was released on April 8.

== Composition ==
"ASAP" was written and composed by Black Eyed Pilseung and Jeon Goon, and arranged by Rado. Musically, the song is described by NME as "trapped between a cutesy bubblegum pop production and a sensual summer jam". "ASAP" was composed in the key of C major, with a tempo of 132 beats per minute.

== Commercial performance ==
"ASAP" debuted at position 108 on South Korea's Gaon Digital Chart in the chart issue dated April 11–17, 2021. The song then ascended to position 9 in the chart issue dated June 6–12, 2021. The song debuted at position 70 on Billboard K-pop Hot 100 in the chart issue dated April 24, 2021. The song then ascended to position 9 in the chart issue dated May 29, 2021.

== Promotion ==
Prior to the single album's release, on April 8, 2021, STAYC held a live event called "STAYC (스테이씨) The 2nd Single Album [STAYDOM] Showcase" on V Live to introduce the single album and its song including "ASAP". Following the release of the single album, the group performed "ASAP" on five music programs: KBS2's Music Bank on every Thursday from April 9 to April 30, SBS's Inkigayo on every Sunday from April 11 to May 2, SBS MTV's The Show on April 13 and 20, MBC's Show! Music Core on April 17 and May 1, and MBC M's Show Champion on April 21.

== Accolades ==
"ASAP" was one of the Digital Song Bonsang winners at the 36th Golden Disc Awards in 2022. It also received nominations Best Dance Performance – Female Group at the 2021 Mnet Asian Music Awards, and Best K-pop Song at the 2022 Korean Music Awards. It was named amongst the best K-pop songs of 2021 by Billboard (22nd), Idology (unranked), NME (19th), and Time (unranked).

== Credits and personnel ==
Credits adapted from Melon.

Studio

- Ingrid Studio – recording, digital editing
- Koko Sound Studio – mixing
- Metropolis Mastering Studios – mastering

Personnel

- STAYC – vocals, background vocals
- Black Eyed Pilseung – lyrics, composition
- Jeon Goon – lyrics, composition
- Rado – arrangement, bass, keyboard
- Jung Eun-kyung – recording, digital editing
- Kim Su-jeong – recording
- Go Hyeon-jeong – mixing
- Kim Jun–sang – mixing (assistant)
- Jung Gi-un – mixing (assistant)
- Im Min-woo – mixing (assistant)
- Stuart Hawkes – mastering

== Charts ==
=== Weekly charts ===
Weekly chart performance for "ASAP"
Chart (2021)	Peak position
South Korea (Gaon)	9
South Korea (K-pop Hot 100)	9

=== Monthly charts ===
Monthly chart performance for "ASAP"
Chart (2021)	Peak position
South Korea (Gaon)	8
South Korea (K-pop Hot 100)	10

=== Year-end charts ===
2021 Year-end chart performance for "ASAP"
Chart	Position
South Korea (Gaon)	28

2022 Year-end chart performance for "ASAP"
Chart	Peak position
South Korea (Circle)	171

== Certifications ==
Streaming certifications for "ASAP"
Region	Certification	Certified units/sales
South Korea (KMCA)	Platinum	100,000,000^{†}
^{†} Streaming-only figures based on certification alone.

== Release history ==
Release history for "ASAP"
Region	Date	Format	Label	Ref.
Various	April 8, 2021	Digital download; streaming	High Up Entertainment; Kakao	
