= Stereotype (EP) =

- Digital cover

EP by STAYC
- Released: September 6, 2021
- Length: 12:56
- Language: Korean
- Label: High Up; Kakao
- Producer: Black Eyed Pilseung; Jeon Goon

STAYC chronology
Staydom (2021)	Stereotype (2021)	Young-Luv.com (2022)

Singles from Stereotype
- 1. "Stereotype" Released: September 6, 2021

Stereotype (stylized in all caps) is the debut extended play (EP) by South Korean girl group STAYC. Distributed by Kakao Entertainment, it was released by High Up Entertainment on September 6, 2021, almost ten months after the group's debut.

== Composition ==
Stereotype contains four songs. The title track conveys the message that people should not be judged based on their looks, and instead appreciated for the "various colors and elements that make who they are". The other tracks include "I'll Be There", which "speaks about the pain of a breakup", "Slow Down"," a tropical house song, and "Complex", a song that "blends groovy beats with catchy melodies".

== Release ==
On August 4, 2021, High Up Entertainment announced that STAYC would be releasing their first EP in early September. On August 15, 2021, its title was revealed to be Stereotype. The EP and the music video for its title track were released simultaneously on September 6.

== Reception ==
Professional ratings
Review scores
Source	Rating
IZM	3/5 stars
NME	5/5 stars

In a review for NME, Carmen Chin wrote that the EP was "a project of pure aural bliss" and "STAYC doesn't just challenge expectations of girl group music, but blazes the trail for a promising future through what has become their best release yet."

== Commercial performance ==
Stereotype sold over 114,000 copies within one week after being released. It debuted at number 2 on the Gaon Album Chart.

== Track listing ==
All tracks were written by Black Eyed Pilseung and Jeon Goon, and arranged by Rado.

Stereotype track listing
No.	Title	Length
1.	"Stereotype" (색안경)	3:11
2.	"I'll Be There"	3:09
3.	"Slow Down"	3:10
4.	"Complex"	3:06
Total length:		12:56

Notes

- All tracks are stylized in all caps.

== Charts ==
Weekly chart performance for Stereotype
Chart (2021)	Peak position
Japanese Albums (Oricon)	25
South Korean Albums (Gaon)	2

== Release history ==
Release history for Stereotype
Region	Date	Format	Label
Various	September 6, 2021	Digital download; streaming	High Up; Kakao
South Korea	September 6, 2021	CD	High Up; Kakao
