= Teddy Bear (single album) =

- Digital cover

Single album by STAYC
- Released: February 14, 2023
- Length: 6:07
- Language: Korean
- Labels: High Up; Kakao

STAYC chronology
We Need Love (2022)	Teddy Bear (2023)	Teenfresh (2023)

Singles from Teddy Bear
- 1. "Poppy (Korean ver.)" Released: February 3, 2023; 2. "Teddy Bear" Released: February 14, 2023

Teddy Bear is the fourth single album by South Korean girl group STAYC. It was released by High Up Entertainment on February 14, 2023, and contains two tracks, including the lead single of the same name.

== Background and release ==
On January 18, 2023, High Up Entertainment announced that STAYC would be releasing an album in February. On January 31, it was announced STAYC would be releasing their fourth single album titled Teddy Bear on February 14. On February 1, the promotional schedule was released. On February 3, the Korean version of "Poppy", which was previously released as the Japanese-language debut single, was pre-released alongside its performance music video. The music video teasers for lead single "Teddy Bear" was released on February 5 and 12. The single album was released alongside the music video for "Teddy Bear" on February 14.

== Composition ==
Teddy Bear consists of two tracks. The lead single "Teddy Bear" was described as a pop punk song with lyrics that "contains a message of positivity that gives hope and comfort". The second track "Poppy" was described as a "quirky" pop song with "an addictive chorus, and lovely yet kitsch mood".

== Commercial performance ==
Teddy Bear debuted at number one on South Korea's Circle Album Chart in the chart issue dated February 12–18, 2023.

== Promotion ==
Following the release of Teddy Bear, on February 14, 2023, STAYC held a live event to introduce the single album and communicate with their fans.

== Track listing ==
Track listing for Teddy Bear
No.	Title	Lyrics	Music	Arrangement	Length
1.	"Teddy Bear"	B.E.P; Flyt	B.E.P; Jeon Goon	Rado; Flyt	3:09
2.	"Poppy" (Korean ver.)	B.E.P; Flyt; Will.B	B.E.P; Moon Seo-ul (Mumw); Moon Da-eun (Mumw); Co-sho	Rado; Flyt	2:58
Total length:					6:07

== Charts ==
=== Weekly charts ===
Weekly chart performance for Teddy Bear
Chart (2023)	Peak position
South Korean Albums (Circle)	1

=== Monthly charts ===
Monthly chart performance for Teddy Bear
Chart (2023)	Peak position
South Korean Albums (Circle)	6

=== Year-end charts ===
Year-end chart performance for Teddy Bear
Chart (2023)	Position
South Korean Albums (Circle)	60

== Certification and sales ==
Certification and sales for Teddy Bear
Region	Certification	Certified units/Sales
South Korea (KMCA)	Platinum	414,798

== Release history ==
Release history for Teddy Bear
Region	Date	Format	Label
South Korea	February 14, 2023	CD	High Up; Kakao
Various	February 14, 2023	Digital download; streaming	High Up; Kakao
