= So Bad (STAYC song) =

2020 single by STAYC

Single by STAYC

from the album Star to a Young Culture
- Language: Korean; English
- B-side: "Like This"
- Released: November 12, 2020
- Recorded: 2020
- Genre: Electropop; synth-wave; drum and bass
- Length: 3:32 (Original version); 3:25 (Remix version)
- Label: High Up Entertainment; Kakao M
- Songwriters: Black Eyed Pilseung; Jeon Goon
- Producer: Black Eyed Pilseung

STAYC singles chronology
| "So Bad" (2020) | "ASAP" (2021) |

Music video
- "So Bad" on YouTube

"So Bad" (stylized in all caps) is the debut single released by South Korean girl group STAYC. Co-written and produced by Black Eyed Pilseung, the song was released on November 12, 2020, as the lead single from the group's debut single album Star to a Young Culture. A remix of the song titled "So Bad (Tak Remix)" was released on January 10, 2021. The remix was later included on the group's second single album Staydom.

== Music video ==
The music video for the song was released on the same day and the song and amassed over 2.6 million views in its first 24 hours of upload. The video was directed by Minjun Lee and Hayoung Lee.

=== Plagiarism accusation ===
On November 16, 2020, Korean netizens noticed that aspects of the "So Bad" music video appeared similar to the music video of "Midnight Sky" by Miley Cyrus. A few days after the accusations, Legend Film, the music video production company, issued an apology.

== Commercial performance ==
The song debuted at number 90 on Billboard's K-pop Hot 100 later peaking at number 82, and number 21 on the World Digital Song Sales chart. The song also entered the Korean Gaon Digital Chart peaking at number 159.

== Live performance ==
To promote the song and the album, STAYC performed "So Bad" and B-side "Like This" through a VLIVE debut showcase. The group made their music show debut on November 13, 2020, at KBS Music Bank, and then at Show Champion, Inkigayo, and The Show.

== Track listing ==
Download and streaming

1. "So Bad" – 3:32

Streaming (Tak Remix)

1. "So Bad (Tak Remix)" – 3:05

== Accolades ==
"So Bad" received a nomination for New Artist of the Year – Digital at the 2021 Gaon Chart Music Awards. Paper ranked it number 23 in their list of the 40 Best K-pop Songs of 2020.

== Charts ==
Chart performance for "So Bad"
| Chart (2020) | Peak position |
|---|---|
| South Korea (Gaon) | 159 |
| South Korea (K-pop Hot 100) | 82 |
| US World Digital Song Sales (Billboard) | 21 |

== Release history ==
| Region | Date | Version | Format | Label |
|---|---|---|---|---|
| Various | November 12, 2020 | Original | Digital download; streaming | High Up Entertainment |
| Various | April 8, 2021 | TAK Remix | Streaming | High Up Entertainment |
