= Park Si-eun (entertainer) =

South Korean actress and singer (born 2001)

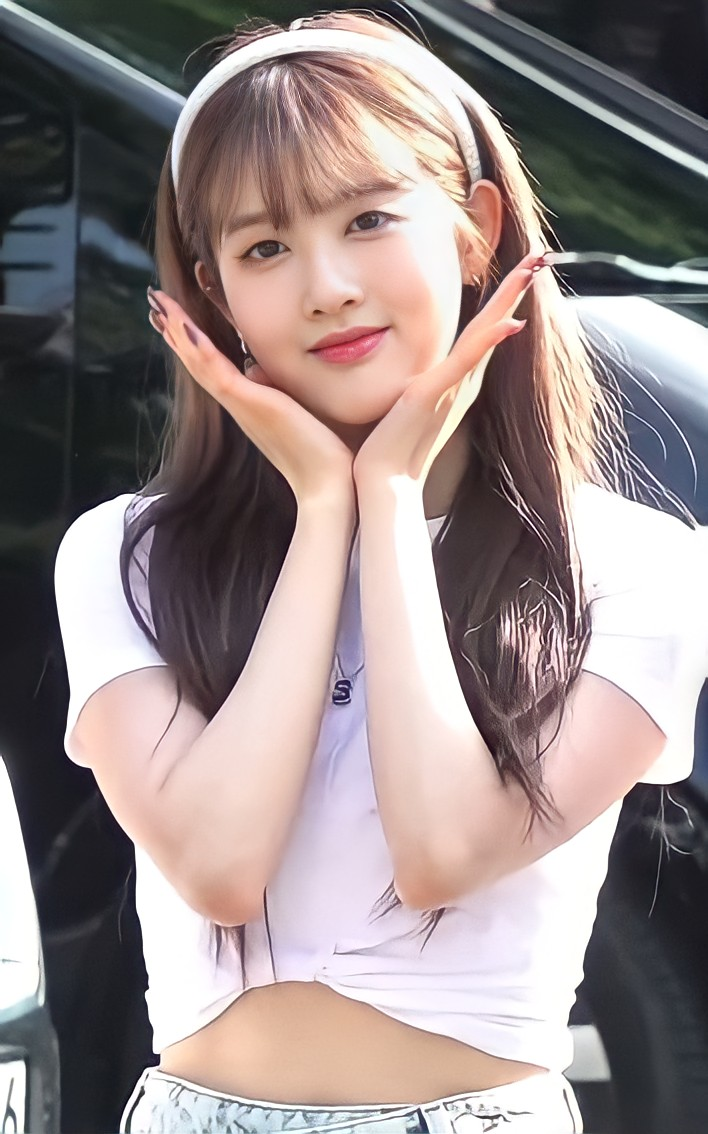
- Park in July 2022
- Born: August 1, 2001 (age 25); Seoul, South Korea
- Education: Chung-Ang University
- Occupations: Singer; actress
- Years active: 2012–present
- Agents: Fe Entertainment; JYP
- Musical career
- Genre: K-pop
- Instrument: Vocals
- Years active: 2020–present
- Label: High Up Entertainment
- Member of: STAYC

Korean name
- Hangul: 박시은
- RR: Bak Sieun
- MR: Pak Siŭn

Park Si-eun (Korean: 박시은; born August 1, 2001) is a South Korean singer and actress. After debuting as a child actress in 2014, she starred in several television series and films, winning the award for Best Young Actress at the 2018 SBS Drama Awards for her role as young Woo Seo-ri in Still 17. She was both an actor and idol trainee in JYP Entertainment, but left the company in 2019 after JYP Actors became defunct. After signing with High Up Entertainment in December 2019, she debuted as a member of the girl group STAYC in November 2020.

== Personal life ==
Born on August 1, 2001 in Ichon-dong, Yongsan District, Seoul, South Korea, Park is the daughter of Park Nam-jung, one of the most popular singers in South Korea in the late 1980s.

== Filmography ==
=== Film ===
Year	Title	Role	Ref.
2015	Love Forecast	Kang Joon-hee	
2018	Golden Slumber	Jeon Sun-young	

=== Television series ===
Year	Title	Role	Ref.
2014	Pluto Squad	Jin Sun-mi	
2014	Pride and Prejudice	Han Yeol-mu (young)	
2015	Six Flying Dragons	Yeon-hee (young)	
2016	Signal	Oh Eun-ji	
2016	The Good Wife	Lee Seo-yeon	
2016	Welcome to My Lab 2	Jenny	
2016	The Gentlemen of Wolgyesu Tailor Shop	Oh Young-eun (young)	
2017	Queen for Seven Days	Shin Chae-kyung (young)	
2017	Criminal Minds	Mo Ji-eun	
2017	Rain or Shine	Ha Moon-soo (young)	
2018	Still 17	Woo Seo-ri (young)	
2019	The Crowned Clown	Choi Kye-hwan	
2019	Everything and Nothing	An Seo-yeon	
2020	Mystic Pop-up Bar	Wol-joo (young)	

=== Television show ===
Year	Title	Role	Notes	Ref.
2012	Star Junior Show Bungeoppang	Cast Member		
2013	The Unlimited Show	Cast Member	Seasons 4–5	
2013	Kids Are Life's Blessing	Cast Member		
2013	Star Family Show	Cast Member		
2019	King of Mask Singer	Contestant	(101st Generation Mask King)	

=== Hosting ===
Year	Title	Role	Notes	Ref.
2016	Inkigayo	Special MC	with Jackson and Lee Hong-bin	
2021	Inkigayo	Special MC	with Sungchan and Jihoon	
2022	11th Gaon Chart Music Awards	MC	with Doyoung and Jaejae	
2023	Show! Music Core	Special MC	with Jungwoo	

== Awards and nominations ==
Name of the award ceremony, year presented, category, nominee of the award, and the result of the nomination
Award ceremony	Year	Category	Nominee / Work	Result	Ref.
KBS Drama Awards	2017	Best Young Actress	Queen for Seven Days	Nominated	
SBS Drama Awards	2018	Best Young Actress	Still 17	Won	
