= From. Victon =

EP by Victon
- Released: November 9, 2017
- Genre: K-pop
- Length: 20:30
- Label: Plan A

Victon chronology
Identity (2017)	From. Victon (2017)	Time of Sorrow (2018)

Singles from From. Victon
- 1. "Remember Me" Released: November 9, 2017

From. Victon (stylized as From. VICTON) is the fourth EP by the South Korean boy group Victon. It was released on November 9, 2017 with the lead single "Remember Me" by Plan A Entertainment and distributed by Kakao Entertainment.

== Background and release ==
The EP was released on the group's one year anniversary of debut. The EP contains six songs, including the lead single "Remember Me". Member Do Han-se contributed to writing on all six of the tracks, and all the member's of Victon participated in the writing of the song "Have a Good Night".

The music video for "Remember Me" featured labelmate Hayoung.

== Commercial performance ==
The album peaked at number fourteen on the Gaon weekly album chart. By May 2020, the EP had sold 16,364 copies in South Korea.

== Track listing ==
No.	Title	Lyrics	Music	Arrangement	Length
1.	"Remember Me"	Good Life; Do Han-se	Good Life	Good Life	3:21
2.	"Because of You"	Zomay; Obrose; Do Han-se; Obrose2; N-Draw	Zomay; Obrose; Obrose2; N-Draw	Obrose; N-Draw	3:46
3.	"Have a Good Night" (Stage Ver.)	BeomxNang; Beverly Kidz; Han Seung-woo; Kang Seung-sik; Heo Chan; Lim Se-jun; Choi Byung-chan; Do Han-se; Jung Su-bin	BeomxNang; Beverly Kidz	BeomxNang; Beverly Kidz	3:21
4.	"Stay With Me"	Han Seung-woo; Do Han-se	Super Changtai; Lavin; Vanta Black	Super Changtai; Lavin	3:05
5.	"Timeline"	Juhyo; Han Seung-woo; Do Han-se	Tommy Park; Juhyo; Versachoi	Tommy Park; Juhyo; Versachoi	3:20
6.	"Remember Me" (Acoustic ver.)	Good Life; Do Han-se	Good Life	Kim Dae-ju	3:37
Total length:					20:30

== Charts ==
=== Weekly charts ===
Chart (2017)	Peak position
South Korean Albums (Gaon)	14

=== Monthly chart ===
Chart (2021)	Peak position
South Korean Albums (Gaon)	25

== Sales ==
Region	Sales
Album
South Korea (Gaon)	16,364
