= TMI News =

South Korean news show

- Genre: Talk show
- Presented by: Jun Hyun-moo; Jang Do-yeon
- Country of origin: South Korea
- Original language: Korean
- No. of seasons: 2
- No. of episodes: 86

Production
- Production location: South Korea
- Running time: 60 minutes

Original release
- Network: Mnet
- Release: April 25, 2019 – September 29, 2021

Related
- TMI News Show

TMI News (Korean: TMI 뉴스) is a South Korean news variety show that airs on Mnet.

The show aired on Thursday at 20:00 (KST) starting from April 25, 2019 until May 30, 2019. It then went on a hiatus without notice, but returned on July 31, 2019 and aired on every Wednesday at 20:00 (KST). The show had a hiatus after the episode on November 27, 2019, and returned again starting January 15, 2020 to August 26, 2020. The show made another return beginning March 10, 2021, as a new season, and concluded on September 29, 2021.

A new series related to the show, TMI News Show, began airing from February 9, 2022 to September 30, 2022.

== Program ==
The show is the first ever global K-pop idols' news & talk show. The "TMI" in the show's name stands for Thursday Mnet Idol. The show had requested for any possible TMI (Too Much Information) information from the public about the idol groups or their individual members through their online form, and the information that will be used for the show is "news reported" on the show.

From episode 7, the show was revamped into a chart show. In each episode, one or two topics are discussed, and celebrities (or items/programs/situations/places/songs) are ranked according to the topic. If only one topic is discussed in an episode, ten or fourteen celebrities (or items/programs/situations/places/songs) will be listed out, and if two topics are discussed in an episode, seven per topic will be listed.

== Cast ==
=== Current ===
Name	Role & Character	Episode	Ref.
Jun Hyun-moo	Main Anchor	1-86	
Jang Do-yeon	Main Anchor	7-86	

=== Former ===
Name	Role & Character	Episode	Ref.
Park Joon-hyung (g.o.d)	Reporter; idol's "Archaeopteryx" and a reporter who has a "my way" feel	1-6	
DinDin	Reporter; with his Too Much Super Insider ability, he guides to rise himself from a low tide	2-6	
Yoon Bo-mi (Apink)	Reporter; checking facts with her current occupation of being an idol	1-6	
Soobin (WJSN)	TMI Weather Caster; TMI News' multi-player, Human Peach Caster	1-6, 8-24	

== Episodes (Season 1) ==
=== 2019 ===
List of episodes (episode 1–24)

Ep.	Broadcast Date	Theme	Guest(s)	Note(s)
1	April 25	Not Applicable	IZ*ONE	DinDin is absent due to attending his elder sister's wedding in Italy; Sleepy stood in for him in this episode; Special guest: Kim Yeon-ja
2	May 2	Not Applicable	Monsta X	Special guest: Kim Dong-hyun
3	May 9	Not Applicable	Momoland	Momoland member Yeonwoo is absent; Special guest: Lee Min-woong
4	May 16	Not Applicable	Apink	Special guest: Jung Il-hoon (BtoB)
5	May 23	Not Applicable	AB6IX	
6	May 30	Not Applicable	EXID	The show aired on 21:00 (KST) for this episode instead of the usual 20:00 (KST); Special guest: Bae Yoon-jung
Reformation of the show
Ep.	Broadcast Date	Theme	Guest(s)	Note(s)
7	July 31	1. Idols who buy buildings after earning money 2. Idols who got conned after earning money	Kim Jae-hwan	
8	August 7	Idols who succeeded in their diets	Oh My Girl (Seunghee, Arin)	
9	August 14	Real Love and Fake Love idols	Kim Jung-mo	
10	August 21	Idols and hobbies	Pentagon (Hongseok, Kino)	
11	August 28		Oh Ha-young (Apink), Choi Byung-chan (Victon)	
12	September 4	Celebrities who fought significant illnesses	Weki Meki (Choi Yoo-jung, Kim Do-yeon)	
13	September 11	Best idols' physiognomies	X1 (Han Seung-woo, Kim Yo-han, Son Dong-pyo, Nam Do-hyon)	
14	September 18	Golden spoon idols	CLC (Elkie, Kwon Eun-bin), Kwon Hyun-bin	
15	September 25	1. Famous songs loved by the people these days 2. Famous past time songs	Norazo	
16	October 2	1. Celebrities who changed professions 2. Celebrities who have sideline careers	Ateez (Hongjoong, Wooyoung)	
17	October 9	1. Idols who are rich in music royalties 2. Idols who are rich in talents 3. Idols who are rich in connections	Stray Kids (Lee Know, Hyunjin)	
18	October 16	1. Idols who are successful in changing concepts 2. Idols with irrational concepts	NU'EST (Aron, JR)	
19	October 23	1. Top male and female idols companies had missed out 2. Idols who carry small and medium-sized companies	N.Flying (Cha Hun, Kim Jae-hyun)	
20	October 30	1. Top male and female idols who are brainiacs 2. Top versatile idols	Monsta X (Wonho, Joohoney)	
21	November 6	1. Male and female idols who shined in Korea	Victon (Choi Byung-chan, Jung Su-bin)	
22	November 13	1. Idols who are big eaters 2. Idols who eat weird food	Day6 (Young K, Dowoon)	
23	November 20	1. Dogs of idols 2. Cats of idols	AOA (Jimin, Hyejeong)	
24	November 27	1. Legendary stages of Mnet Asian Music Awards; 2. Reversal legendary stages of Mnet Asian Music Awards	CIX (BX, Bae Jin-young)	

=== 2020 ===
List of episodes (episode 25-56)

Ep.	Broadcast Date	Theme	Guest(s)	Note(s)
25	January 15	1. Idols born in the Year of the Rat who would hit big 2. Idols born in the Year of the Rat who should take care of themselves	Verivery (Yeonho, Kangmin)	
26	January 22	2020 New Year Special: Idol Trot Contest; Top 10 Trot Songs That Koreans Love	Ken (VIXX), Sojung (Ladies' Code), Solbin (Laboum), Seunghee (Oh My Girl), Kim Chae-won (April), J-Us (ONF), Y (Golden Child), Kim Dong-han, Jongho (Ateez), Sohee (Nature)	Special appearances by Laboum (Soyeon, Haein)
27	January 29	1. Idols that fans have been waiting the most for their discharges from the army 2. Idols that are still far away from their discharges from the army	N.Flying (Yoo Hwe-seung, Seo Dong-sung)	
28	February 5	1. Idols who look more mature than they actually are 2. Idols who look a lot younger than they actually are	Golden Child (Lee Jang-jun, Hong Joo-chan, Choi Bo-min)	
29	February 12	Cities/districts that idols were from or were born in	Sojung (Ladies' Code), Mimi (Oh My Girl), Kim Dong-han, Kim Sang-gyun (JBJ95)	
30	February 19	1. Pretty male idols other than Kim Hee-chul; 2. Baddest (girl crush) female idols other than Lee Hyo-ri	The Boyz (Hyunjae, Ju Hak-nyeon)	
31	February 26	1. Idols with the most unusual real names 2. Idols with the most unusual special habits	TO1 (J.You, Woonggi)	
32	March 4	Mnet 25th Anniversary Special; 1. Mnet programs that did well 2. Famous stars that were well raised by Mnet	Weki Meki	
33	March 11	1. Idols who had the most special activities while in school 2. Idols who were top role models in school	Loona (Chuu, Hyunjin)	
34	March 25	1. Male idols with most diverse activities before debut 2. Female idols with most diverse activities before debut	Ong Seong-wu	
35	April 1	1. Idols who made their marriage announcements 2. Idols who are their nieces and/or nephews' fools	Changjo (Teen Top), Park Cho-rong (Apink)	
36	April 8	1. Male idols that had left legendary prohibited videos 2. Female idols that had left legendary prohibited videos	Chun Myung-hoon, Narsha (Brown Eyed Girls)	
37	April 15	Idols that had worn the priciest items on them	Han Hye-yeon	
38	April 22	Musicians' pick! Personal real experience songs that has empathy	Seo Ji-eum, Jeong Se-woon	
39	April 29	1. Most expensive male idols' houses 2. Most expensive female idols' houses	Park Jong-bok, Mijoo (Lovelyz)	
40	May 6	1. Fans' idol tributes that are insurmountable 2. Idols' fan tributes that are insurmountable	April (Lee Na-eun, Lee Jin-sol)	
41	May 13	Unique goods personally picked by idols	Ken (VIXX), Yoo Young-jae	
42	May 20	Scariest stories in the world of music	TXT	
43	May 27	1. Idols who are excellent at cooking 2. Idols who are bad at cooking	B.O.Y	
44	June 3	1. Male idol songs that became popular after changing their singers 2. Female idol songs that became popular after changing their singers	Seo Eun-kwang (BtoB), Hui (Pentagon)	
45	June 10	1. Idols who surprisingly released trot songs 2. Trot singers who debuted as idols	Na Tae-joo, Kim Soo-chan	
46	June 17	Older idols with the most surprising recent updates	Kim Hyung-jun (Taesaja), MJ (Astro)	
47	June 24	Idols who wore the most expensive clothes	Kwon Hyun-bin, Han Hyun-min	
48	July 1	1. Male idols that their mothers had the best conception dreams 2. Female idols that their mothers had the best conception dreams	Cravity (Jungmo, Hyeongjun)	
49	July 8	Idols who experienced the most shocking incidents or accidents	Jun Jin (Shinhwa), Kwon Hyun-bin	
50	July 15	Music video locations that fans want to visit the most	ONF (Hyojin, Wyatt)	
51	July 22	Idols that almost didn't debut	Weeekly (Lee Soo-jin, Jihan)	
52	July 29	1. Male idols with the best bodies that others would want to have 2. Female idols with the best bodies that others would want to have	Lee Jang-jun (Golden Child), Kwon Hyun-bin	
53	August 5	Best summer songs that must be listened in the summer	(G)I-dle (Miyeon, Minnie, Yuqi)	
54	August 12	Most scary true stories idols had experienced	Lee Jin-hyuk (Up10tion)	
55	August 19	Best well-known songs that are hidden	Song Ga-in	
56	August 26	Most expensive cars idols own	Kang Jae-joon, Han Seung-woo (Victon)	

== Episodes (Season 2 - 2021) ==
List of episodes (episode 57-86)

Ep.	Broadcast Date	Theme	Guest(s)	Note(s)
57	March 10	Idols' most expensive collections	Sandara Park, Jo Kwon	
58	March 17	1. Idols with cost-effective fashion 2. Idols with branded fashion	Joo Woo-jae, Bobby (iKon)	
59	March 24	1. Songs that cause massive crowds to dance to 2. Songs that cause massive crowds to sing to	Brave Girls	
60	March 31	1. Male stars who surgeons reveal that people want their faces to be like 2. Female stars who surgeons reveal that people want their faces to be like	Jun Jin (Shinhwa), Ha Sung-woon	
61	April 7	Stars who have caused very huge differences in price for properties	Na Tae-joo, Kim Soo-chan	
62	April 14	1. Idols who have little parts 2. Idols who have many parts	Ateez (Hongjoong, San)	
63	April 21	The most common MBTI types among idols	Astro (Moonbin, Yoon San-ha)	
64	April 28	1. Idols with a lot of experience with part-time jobs 2. Idols born in golden spoon families	IZ*ONE (Choi Ye-na, Kim Min-ju)	
65	May 5	1. Stars who got stabbed in the backs by their acquaintances 2. Stars who got stabbed in the backs by their families	Yesung (Super Junior), Sunny (Girls' Generation)	
66	May 12	1. Female idols without any changes 2. Male idols without any changes	Oh My Girl (Hyojung, Jiho, Binnie)	
67	May 19	Stars who rode the most expensive cars (2021 Version)	Yang Ji-eun, Hong Ji-yun	
68	May 26	1. Lovestar couples 2. Lovestar married couples	Kang Seung-yoon (Winner)	
69	June 2	Idols with the most expensive school fees	Tomorrow X Together (Taehyun, Huening Kai), Enhypen (Heeseung, Jay)	
70	June 9	Company buildings worth more than 10 billion won	Lee Jung-shin (CNBLUE), Kim Jae-hyun (N.Flying)	
71	June 16	Stars' interior items	Mijoo (Lovelyz), Cho Hee-sun	
72	June 23	Stars that are married to the richest 1%	Kim Min-gi, Hong Yoon-hwa	
73	June 30	Stars who show filial piety with money	Shinsadong Tiger, Tri.be (Songsun, Mire)	
74	July 7	Stars who used the most expensive items	NCT Dream (Mark, Jisung)	
75	July 14	Stars who had selected the top houses	SF9 (Inseong, Jaeyoon, Chani)	
76	July 21	1. Stars who are self-sufficient 2. Stars who are golden spoons	Park Goon, Shin In-seon	
77	July 28	1. Stars who shine through earning a lot 2. Stars who are under debt	Loona (Yves, Chuu)	
78	August 4	Stars who have the most expensive advertisement model fees	Shin Ji (Koyote), Soyeon ((G)I-DLE)	
79	August 11	Stars who wore the most expensive personal clothes	The Boyz (Hyunjae, Juyeon, Sunwoo)	
80	August 18	South Korea's representative performance makers	Bae Yoon-jung, Aiki, Choi Yoo-jung (Weki Meki)	
81	August 25	1. Male stars with the best physicals, picked by trainers 2. Female stars with the best physicals, picked by trainers	Park Ji-hoon, CIX (Seunghun, Bae Jin-young)	
82	September 1	Stars who went for luxurious holidays	BtoB (Seo Eun-kwang, Peniel)	
83	September 8	Stars who had the worst rumours/scandals	Weeekly (Lee Soo-jin, Monday)	
84	September 15	1. Stars with the most wealth 2. Stars with the top pedigrees	Gree, Lee Chae-yeon	
85	September 22	Tough Unnies of celebrity industry	Monika, Gabee	
86	September 29	Stars with the best profit in the first half of 2021	fromis 9 (Jang Gyu-ri, Lee Chae-young), Kwon Eun-bi	
