= Voice to New World =

EP by Victon
- Released: November 9, 2016
- Genres: K-pop; R&B; dance
- Length: 22:07
- Language: Korean
- Label: Plan A

Victon chronology
Voice to New World (2016)	Ready (2017)

Singles from Voice to New World
- 1. "I'm Fine" Released: November 9, 2016; 2. "What Time Is It Now?" Released: November 9, 2016

Voice to New World is the debut extended play by South Korean boy group Victon. The EP was released on November 9, 2016, by Plan A Entertainment.

== Background and release ==
After the finale of their pre-debut reality show Me & 7 Men, a teaser was aired on November 1, 2016, featuring Apink member Son Na-eun, revealing the group's official debut date to be November 9. On November 4, a performance trailer for "What Time Is It Now?" was released, a track from their first EP.

The album tells a story of a boy who's being disregarded and neglected by his girlfriend but can't help but stay with her. The album is described to have a pop funk sound throughout the songs. On November 9, Victon made their debut with the release of their first EP Voice to New World along with the title track "I'm Fine." The group performed both "I'm Fine" and "What Time Is It Now?" on music shows for their promotions.

== Track listing ==
No.	Title	Lyrics	Music	Arrangement	Length
1.	"What Time Is It Now?"	BeomxNang; Han Seung-woo; Kang Seung-sik; Lim Se-jun; Heo Chan; Choi Byung-chan; Do Han-se; Jeong Su-bin	BeomxNang	BeomxNang	3:14
2.	"I'm Fine (아무렇지 않은 척)"	BeomxNang; Han Seung-woo; Do Han-se	BeomxNang	BeomxNang	3:32
3.	"Beautiful"	Won Young Hon; Lee Yang Bin; ESBEE	Won Young Hon; Lee Yang Bin; ESBEE	Won Young Hon; Lee Yang Bin; ESBEE	3:45
4.	"Your Smile and You" (날 보며 웃어준다)	Park Seong-su; Monster no. 9; Lim Jeong-ho; Do Han-se	Park Seong-su; Monser no. 9	Park Seong-su; Monser no. 9	4:26
5.	"The Chemistry"	Yu Geun-ho; Han Seung-woo; Do Han-se; Wiidope	Wiidope	Wiidope	3:47
6.	"#Begin Again" (#떨려 (Victon version))	MU-D9	MU-D9	MU-D9	3:23
Total length:					22:07

== Charts ==
=== Weekly charts ===
Chart (2016)	Peak position
South Korean Albums (Gaon)	11

=== Monthly charts ===
Chart (2016)	Peak position
South Korean Albums (Gaon)	24

== Sales ==
Region	Sales
Album
South Korea (Gaon)	16,074
