= Ready (Victon EP) =

EP by Victon
- Released: March 2, 2017
- Genre: K-pop
- Length: 16:26
- Label: Plan A

Victon chronology
Voice to New World (2016)	Ready (2017)	Identity (2017)

Singles from Ready
- 1. "Eyez Eyez" Released: March 2, 2017

Ready is the second extended play by the South Korean boy group Victon. It was released on March 2, 2017 with the lead single "Eyez Eyez" by Plan A Entertainment and distributed by Kakao Entertainment.

== Background and release ==
The EP contains five songs, including the lead single "Eyez Eyez" which was produced by BeomxNang, who also produced the lead singles for their debut EP Voice to New World. Group member Do Han-se contributed lyrics to all five songs on the album, with members Han Seung-woo and Heo Chan also contributing to songwriting.

== Commercial performance ==
The album peaked at number six on the Gaon weekly album chart, reaching the same peak in two separate weeks a month apart. By April 2017, the EP had sold 27,395 copies in South Korea.

== Track listing ==
No.	Title	Lyrics	Music	Arrangement	Length
1.	"Eyez Eyez"	BeomxNang; Do Han-se; Byun Mu-hyeok; Haerian	BeomxNang	BeomxNang	3:07
2.	"In the Air"	Wiidope; A-Rod; Yu Geun-ho; Yuya; Heo Chan; Do Han-se	Wiidope; A-Rod; Albi Albertsson	Wiidope	3:37
3.	"Blank" (얼타)	BeomxNang; Do Han-se	BeomxNang	BeomxNang	3:08
4.	"So Bad.." (이 나쁜..)	Park Seong-su; Monster no. 9; Han Seung-woo; Do Han-se	Park Seong-su; Monster no. 9	Park Seong-su; Monster no. 9	3:24
5.	"Sunrise"	Han Seung-woo; Do Han-se	Command Freaks; Gabriel Brandes	Command Freaks	3:10
Total length:					16:26

== Charts ==
=== Weekly charts ===
Chart (2017)	Peak position
South Korean Albums (Gaon)	6

=== Monthly chart ===
Chart (2021)	Peak position
South Korean Albums (Gaon)	12

== Sales ==
Region	Sales
Album
South Korea (Gaon)	28,232
