= Nostalgia (Victon EP) =

EP by Victon
- Released: November 4, 2019
- Recorded: 2019
- Genre: K-pop
- Length: 19:41
- Label: Play M

Victon chronology
Time of Sorrow (2018)	Nostalgia (2019)	Continuous (2020)

Singles from Nostalgia
- 1. "Nostalgic Night" Released: November 4, 2019

Nostalgia (stylized in all lower caps) is the fifth extended play by the South Korean boy group Victon. It was released on November 4, 2019, by Play M Entertainment, and distributed by Kakao Entertainment.

== Background and release ==
For the release of Nostalgia, Victon was a six-member group, with member Han Seung-woo absent as he was promoting with X1. The EP was the group's first comeback in nearly 18 months, and following the announcement of their comeback through social media, the group entered the Billboard Social 50 chart for the first time since their debut.

== Critical reception & commercial performance ==
For the title track "Nostalgic Night", the group won their first music show win since the group's debut in 2016. Following its release, the track charted at number 24 on Gaon's component weekly Download Chart.

The EP charted on Gaon's weekly album chart at number four in its first week of release, and charted at number seven in its first month. It sold more than 70,000 copies in 2019.

Reviews noted the album's much darker tone and the group's departure from its previous releases as they shied away from the more bright and upbeat musical style which they were initially known for. In its review of the album, English-language K-pop website SeoulBeats commented: "The album breaks away from their bubbly and anthemic roots for a sound more their own, a sound first shown with their preceding single, 'Time of Sorrow'."

== Track listing ==
No.	Title	Lyrics	Music	Arrangement	Length
1.	"Intro (nostalgia)"		BXN; Byeonn Mu-hyeok	BXN; Byeon Mu-hyeok	1:23
2.	"Nostalgic Night" (그리운 밤)	BXN; Do Han-se	BXN; Heo Chan	BXN	3:15
3.	"New World"	JQ; makeumine; Seonghyun Bae; Do Han-se	Ryan S. Jhun; Tim Tan	Ryan S. Jhun; Tim Tan	3:53
4.	"Farewell" (걱정이 돼서)	Bluesun; Do Han-se	Bluesun; Any Massinga; Vincenzo; Fuxxy	Any Massinga	3:35
5.	"Here I Am"	Kang Seung-sik; Do Han-se	e.one; Chris Wahle	Chris Wahle	3:58
6.	"Hands Up"	Kim Tae-ju; Do Han-se	Kim Tae-ju	Kim Tae-ju	3:37
Total length:					19:41

== Charts ==
=== Weekly charts ===
Chart (2020)	Peak position
South Korean Albums (Gaon)	4

=== Monthly charts ===
Chart (2020)	Peak position
South Korean Albums (Gaon)	7

== Sales ==
Region	Sales
Album
South Korea (Gaon)	74,602
