= Mayday (single album) =

Single album by Victon
- Released: June 2, 2020
- Recorded: 2020
- Genres: K-pop; R&B; dance-pop
- Length: 10:17
- Label: Play M

Victon chronology
Continuous (2020)	Mayday (2020)	Voice: The Future Is Now (2021)

Singles from Mayday
- 1. "Mayday" Released: June 2, 2020

Mayday is the second single album by the South Korean boy group Victon. It was released on June 2, 2020 by Play M Entertainment and distributed by Kakao Entertainment.

== Background and release ==
The single album was released three months after their previous comeback, Continuous. The group promoted the single album for two weeks on South Korean music shows, including The Show and Inkigayo. Following the end of the comeback, the group held a virtual concert, 2020 Victon Ontact Live: Mayday, in July.

== Commercial performance ==
Upon release the single album ranked first in the Hanteo daily album rankings, and it sold 95,560 copies in South Korea in 2020. The album debuted at number three on the Gaon Weekly album chart, and at number eight on the monthly chart.

The title track "Mayday" debuted at number 5 on the Gaon Download chart, and its music video surpassed 10 million views in four days. It peaked at number 23 in Billboard's World Digital Song Sales Chart.

For Mayday, Victon won first place on The Show on June 9.

== Track listing ==
No.	Title	Lyrics	Music	Length
1.	"Mayday"	Oh Yu-won; Maeng Ji-na; Han Seung-woo; Do Han-se	Peter Rycroft; Tom Mann; Sebastian Coucheron; Jesper Borgen; Harold Philippon; Ryan Cheon	3:12
2.	"Mayday (Inst.)"		Peter Rycroft; Tom Mann; Sebastian Coucheron; Jesper Borgen; Harold Philippon; Ryan Cheon	3:12
3.	"New World (New ver.)" (CD ver. only)	JQ; makeumine; Bae Seong-hyeon; Do Han-se	Ryan Cheon; Tim Tan	3:53
Total length:				10:17

== Charts ==
=== Weekly charts ===
Chart (2020)	Peak position
South Korean Albums (Gaon)	3
US World Digital Songs (Billboard)	23

=== Monthly chart ===
Chart (2020)	Peak position
South Korean Albums (Gaon)	8

== Sales ==
Region	Sales
Album
South Korea (Gaon)	95,850
