= Identity (Victon EP) =

EP by Victon
- Released: August 23, 2017
- Genre: K-pop
- Length: 17:45
- Label: Plan A

Victon chronology
Ready (2016)	Identity (2017)	From. Victon (2017)

Singles from Identity
- 1. "Unbelievable" Released: August 23, 2017

Identity is the third extended play by the South Korean boy group Victon. It was released on August 23, 2017 with the lead single "Unbelievable" by Plan A Entertainment and distributed by Kakao Entertainment.

== Background and release ==
The EP contains five songs, including the lead single "Unbelievable", released on August 23, 2017. Victon began promotions for the album with a showcase on August 23 and their performance on M Countdown on August 24. The group's rapper, Do Han-se, participated in the writing of four of the five songs, and Han Seung-woo participated in writing for three songs and he co-composed the lead single.

== Commercial performance ==
The album peaked at number six on the Gaon weekly album chart. By October 2017, the EP had sold 22,145 copies in South Korea. The song also sold 1,096 copies in Japan, ranking number 50 on the Oricon Albums Chart, despite the group not having made an official Japanese debut.

== Track listing ==
No.	Title	Lyrics	Music	Arrangement	Length
1.	"Unbelievable"	BeomxNang; Han Seung-woo; Do Han-se	BeomxNang; Han Seung-woo	BeomxNang	3:16
2.	"Stay With Me"	e.one; V.O.S; Do Han-se	e.one; V.O.S	e.one; V.O.S	3:26
3.	"Slow Goodbye"	Esbee; Dong Nae-hyung; Wong Yeong-heon; Yama Art	Dong Nae-hyung; Wong Yeong-heon; Yama Art; Esbee	Dong Nae-hyung; Wong Yeong-heon; Yama Art; Esbee	3:27
4.	"Flower"	Beverly Kidz; Han Seung-woo; Do Han-se	Beverly Kidz	Beverly Kidz	3:37
5.	"Light"	Obros; Kim Jwa-yeong; Han Seung-woo; Do Han-se	Obros; Kim Jwa-yeong	Obros	4:00
Total length:					17:45

== Charts ==
=== Weekly charts ===
Chart (2017)	Peak position
Japanese Albums (Oricon)	50
South Korean Albums (Gaon)	6

=== Monthly chart ===
Chart (2021)	Peak position
South Korean Albums (Gaon)	17

== Sales ==
Region	Sales
Album
South Korea (Gaon)	23,483
Japan (Oricon)	1,096
