= Choi Byung-chan =

South Korean singer and actor (born 1997)

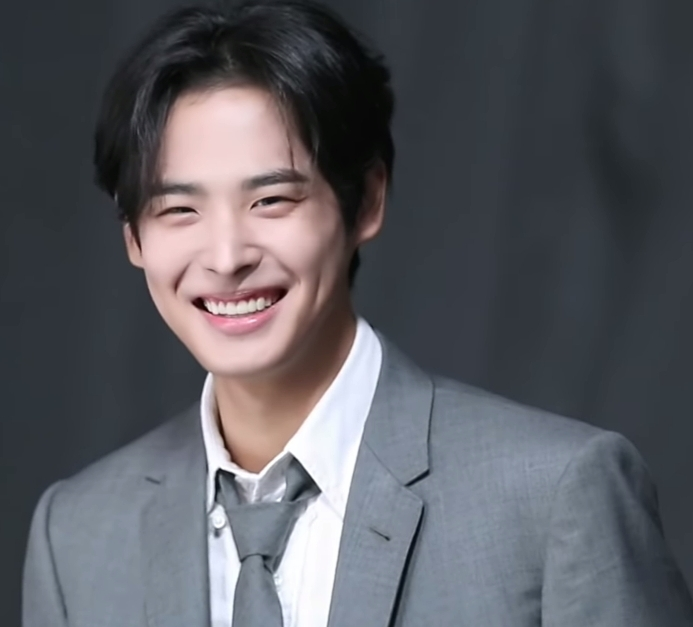
- Choi in 2021
- Born: November 12, 1997 (age 28); Jeonju, North Jeolla, South Korea
- Occupations: Singer; actor
- Musical career
- Genres: K-pop
- Instrument: Vocals
- Years active: 2016–present
- Labels: IST; New Way Company
- Member of: Victon

Korean name
- Hangul: 최병찬
- Hanja: 崔秉燦
- RR: Choe Byeongchan
- MR: Ch'oe Pyŏngch'an

Choi Byung-chan (Korean: 최병찬, born November 12, 1997), also known as Byungchan, is a South Korean singer and actor. He debuted as a member of South Korean group Victon in 2016. In 2020, he made his acting debut in the drama Live On.

== Career ==
=== 2016–2018: Debut with Victon ===
Choi joined A Cube Entertainment (which became Plan A in 2015 and then IST Entertainment in 2022) as a trainee in 2014 and was among the company's earliest batch of male trainees alongside Victon members Heo Chan, Han Seung-woo and Kang Seung-sik. In 2016 he was announced as a member of their new boy group, then referred to as "Plan A Boys", participating in their pre-debut reality show Me and 7 Men. In November 2016, Choi debuted in Plan A's new group, officially named Victon.

=== 2019–present: Produce X 101 and acting debut ===
In 2019, Choi competed in Produce X 101 alongside groupmate Han Seung-woo. Choi withdrew from the show permanently on July 11 to recover from the increasing pain brought by his chronic Achilles tendinitis. After recovering, he became an MC for the SBS MTV program Banban Show along with host Jang Sung-kyu and fellow Produce X 101 participant Song Yuvin. After withdrawing from the show, he returned to Victon for their Nostalgia promotions.

During promotions for Victon's sixth EP Continuous Choi limited his participation due to a herniated disk in his neck.

In November 2020, Choi made his acting debut in the show Live On. He played the role of Kim Yoo-shin and he gained praise for his three-dimensional acting for the character. In promotion of his acting debut, he appeared in the magazine 1st Look.

In October 2021, Choi appeared in his first historical drama The King's Affection.

In February 2022, Choi played Shin Ha-min in the series Business Proposal.

On April 20, 2023, IST Entertainment announced that Choi did not renew his contract with the agency.

== Discography ==
=== Songwriting credits ===
All song credits are adapted from the Korea Music Copyright Association's database unless stated otherwise.

List of songs, showing year released, artist name, and name of the album
Title	Year	Artist	Album	Composer	Lyricist
"What Time Is It Now?"	2016	Victon	Voice to New World	No	Yes
"Just Come"	2017	Victon	Non-album single	Yes	Yes
"Have A Good Night"	2017	Victon	From. Victon	No	Yes
"Carry On"	2021	Victon	Voice: The Future Is Now	No	Yes
"Sweet Travel"	2021	Victon	Non-album single	No	Yes
"Feels Good"	2022	Victon	Choice	No	Yes

== Filmography ==
Key
†	Denotes films that have not yet been released

=== Television series ===
Year	Title	Role	Ref.
2020	Live On	Kim Yoo-shin	
2021	The King's Affection	Kim Ga-on / Kang Eun-seo	
2022	Business Proposal	Shin Ha-min	
2024	Love You as the Price of Betrayal	Kang Woo-jin	
2024	UUU	Eun-tae	
2024	The Natural Neutral Life	Choi Byung-chan	
2026	Love Phobia	Han Baek-ho	

=== Television shows ===
Year	Title	Role	Notes	Ref.
2019	Produce X 101	Contestant		
2022	M Countdown	Special MC	January 20, July 21– August 18	

== Awards and nominations ==
=== Honors ===
Name of organization, year given, and the name of the honor
Organization	Year	Honor	Ref.
Newsis K-EXPO Cultural Awards (Note: Established in 2019 and co-sponsored by Korea's Ministry of Culture, Sports and Tourism, Ministry of Foreign Affairs, Korea Creative Content Agency, Seoul Metropolitan Council and the Seoul Tourism Organization, it awards cultural icons, businesses, and individuals who have contributed greatly to Hallyu, the Korean wave.)	2023	Seoul Tourism Organization CEO Award	
