= Continuous (EP) =

EP by Victon
- Released: March 9, 2020
- Recorded: 2019–2020
- Genre: K-pop
- Length: 18:43
- Label: Play M

Victon chronology
Nostalgia (2019)	Continuous (2020)	Mayday (2020)

Singles from Continuous
- 1. "Howling" Released: March 9, 2020

Continuous is the sixth extended play by the South Korean boy group Victon. It was released on March 9, 2020, with the lead single "Howling", by Play M Entertainment and distributed by Kakao Entertainment.

== Background and release ==
The EP was released on March 9, 2020, with the first promotional appearance on a music show on March 12. The EP was the group's first release with Han Seung-woo since his appearance on Produce X 101 and subsequent debut in X1.

== Commercial performance ==
The album ranked number two on the Gaon weekly album chart. In its first month of sales, it sold 87,971 copies in South Korea, and had sold 95,709 copies by the end of 2020. It also ranked 38 on the Oricon weekly album chart in Japan, the group's highest spot on the chart at its time of release.

== Track listing ==
No.	Title	Lyrics	Music	Arrangement	Length
1.	"Nightmare"	JQ; makeumine; Han Seung-woo; Do Han-se	Ryan I; Tim Tan	Ryan I; Tim Tan	3:28
2.	"Howling"	Nano; HSND; Do Han-se; WWW	Nano; HSND; WWW	HSND; WWW	3:19
3.	"All I Know"	Kim Tae-ju; Heo Chan; Do Han-se	Kim Tae-ju	Kim Tae-ju	3:36
4.	"Petal"	Han Seung-woo; Kang Seung-sik; Do Han-se	Byeon Mu-hyeok; Han Seung-woo; Kang Seung-sik	Byeon Mu-hyeok	3:58
5.	"White Night"	Kiggen; ByMore; Han Seung-woo; Lim Se-jun; Do Han-se	Kiggen; ByMore	ByMore	4:22
Total length:					18:43

== Charts ==
=== Weekly charts ===
Chart (2020)	Peak position
Japanese Albums (Oricon)	38
South Korean Albums (Gaon)	2

=== Monthly charts ===
Chart (2020)	Peak position
South Korean Albums (Gaon)	5

== Sales ==
Region	Sales
Album
South Korea (Gaon)95,709	95,709
Japan (Oricon)	1,067
