= Voice: The Future Is Now =

Studio album by Victon
- Released: January 11, 2021
- Recorded: 2019–2020
- Genre: K-pop
- Length: 42:16
- Label: Play M

Victon chronology
Mayday (2020)	Voice: The Future Is Now (2021)	Chronograph (2022)

Singles from Voice: The Future Is Now
- 1. "What I Said" Released: January 11, 2021

Voice: The Future Is Now is the first studio album by the South Korean boy group Victon. Originally scheduled for release on December 1, 2020, it was released on January 11, 2021 by Play M Entertainment.

== Background and release ==
On November 4, 2020, Victon's first full studio album was announced, scheduled for release on December 1 and titled Voice: The Future Is Now. However, the album was delayed until January 11, 2021, due to the group's quarantine following contact with a staff member that had tested positive for COVID-19.

The album includes thirteen songs, including the title track "What I Said" and four solo songs, one each from Kang Seung-sik, Heo Chan, Lim Se-jun, and Do Han-se respectively.

The music video for the lead single "What I Said" was released on the same day as the album's release. Victon subsequently released a performance video for the single and performance video for the song "Flip a Coin" on January 16 and 18 respectively.

== Critical reception ==
Kim Do-yeon of IZM noted that the album was a departure in style from their earlier work, including by mixing a Latin-inspired brass instrumental with the trap beat. Kim described it as the result of a successful mix of unpredictability and experimentation. Tamar Herman of the South China Morning Post described it as "sleekly produced and also contemplative, with the members ruminating on their careers and the ups and downs of life."

== Commercial performance ==
The album debuted at number four on the weekly Gaon Album chart and number eight on the monthly chart. The album set a new record for the group for their highest first week sales with 71,390 copies sold, and by February the album had sold 107,774 copies in South Korea. "What I Said" also debuted on Billboard's World Digital Song Sales Chart at number twenty-one.

== Track listing ==
No.	Title	Lyrics	Music	Arrangement	Length
1.	"Into the Mirror"	13; MonoTree; J.rise; Do Han-se	13; MonoTree	13	3:30
2.	"What I Said"	Youha; Hwang Yu-bin; Do Han-se	Scott Stoddart; Daniel Kim; Tim Hawes; Ryan S. Jhun; Youha	Scott Stoddart; Ryan S. Jhun	3:26
3.	"Circle"	Noh Joh-hwan; Jeong Jin-woo; Han Seung-woo; Do Han-se	Noh Joh-hwan; Lee Won-jong; Kim Jeong-woo; Jeong Jin-woo; June; Ronnie Icon	Noh Joh-hwan; Lee Won-Jong; Kim Jeong-woo	3:12
4.	"Chess"	Danke; Han Seung-woo; Do Han-se	Coach & Sendo; Andrew Choi; Ryan S. Jhun	Coach & Sendo	3:27
5.	"Up to You"	MonoTree; Do Han-se	MonoTree; Moon Kim; Wassily Gradovsky	Wassily Gradovsky	3:13
6.	"All Day"	Han Seung-woo; Do Han-se	Han Seung-woo; Command Freaks	Command Freaks	3:15
7.	"Carry On" (Kang Seung-sik solo)	Han Seung-woo; Heo Chan; Lim Se-jun; Do Han-se; Choi Byung-chan; Jung Su-bin	Ashley Hicklin; Dominic Lyttle; Dylan Fraser; Ryan S. Jhun	Dominic Little; Ryan S. Jhun	2:49
8.	"Eyes on You" (Heo Chan solo)	Heo Chan	Heo Chan; Toyo	Toyo; Heo Chan	3:22
9.	"Utopia" (Lim Se-jun solo)	Lim Se-jun; Lee A-il; Milena; Stally	Apro; Lee A-il; Lim Se-jun; Stally	Apro; Milena; Stally	2:50
10.	"Where is Love?" (Do Han-se solo)	Do Han-se	Do Han-se; Kwon D.L; Kim Ha-young	Kwon D.L; Kim Ha-young	3:04
11.	"Unpredictable"	Danke; Do Han-se	Oliver Fernstrom; Viktor Strand; Nicklas Eklund	Oliver Fernstrom; Viktor Strand	3:09
12.	"Flip a Coin"	Han Seung-woo; Do Han-se	JinbyJin; Cazzi Opeia; Ellen Berg	JinbyJin	3:33
13.	"We Stay"	Kang Seung-sik; Do Han-se; Jung Su-bin	Chris Wahle; Kim Chang-rak; Aiming	Chris Wahle	3:26
Total length:					42:16

== Charts ==
=== Album ===
==== Weekly charts ====
Chart (2021)	Peak position
South Korean Albums (Gaon)	4

==== Monthly chart ====
Chart (2021)	Peak position
South Korean Albums (Gaon)	8

==== Year-end chart ====
Chart (2021)	Position
South Korean Albums (Gaon)	92

=== Songs ===
==== Weekly chart ====
Chart performance for "What I Said"
Chart (2021)	Peak position
US World Digital Songs (Billboard)	21

== Sales ==
Region	Sales
Album
South Korea (Gaon)	114,245
