= Business Proposal =

2022 South Korean television series

- Promotional poster
- Also known as: A Business Proposal
- Hangul: 사내맞선
- Hanja: 社內맞선
- Lit.: The Office Blind Date
- RR: Sanae matseon
- MR: Sanae massŏn
- Genre: Romantic comedy
- Created by: StudioS
- Based on: The Office Blind Date by HaeHwa
- Written by: Han Seol-hee; Hong Bo-hee
- Directed by: Park Seon-ho
- Starring: Ahn Hyo-seop; Kim Se-jeong; Kim Min-kyu; Seol In-ah
- Music by: Park Se-joon
- Country of origin: South Korea
- Original language: Korean
- No. of episodes: 12

Production
- Production companies: Kakao Entertainment; Kross Pictures

Original release
- Network: SBS TV
- Release: February 28 – April 5, 2022

Business Proposal (Korean: 사내맞선) is a South Korean romantic comedy television series based on the web novel of the same title written by HaeHwa. Directed by Park Seon-ho and written by Han Seol-hee and Hong Bo-hee, it stars Ahn Hyo-seop, Kim Se-jeong, Kim Min-kyu, and Seol In-ah. It tells the story of Shin Ha-ri, an employee who accepts to go on a blind date in place of her friend, but finds out that her date is actually her boss. The series aired for 12 episodes on SBS TV every Monday and Tuesday at 22:00 (KST) from February 28 to April 5, 2022. It is also available for streaming on Netflix in selected regions.

== Plot ==
Shin Ha-ri (Kim Se-jeong) goes on a blind date after she agrees to replace her friend, Jin Young-seo (Seol In-ah), whose father had arranged it. The plan is to have Ha-ri 'getting rejected' by her prospective partner. However, it goes awry when her date turns out to be Kang Tae-moo (Ahn Hyo-seop), CEO of Go Food, the company where Ha-ri works. Tae-moo, who is being pressured by his grandfather Kang Da-goo (Lee Deok-hwa), the chairman of Go Food's parent company, to go on blind dates with suitable marriage partners, decides to marry his blind date partner to avoid going on the rest of the dates, without knowing she is the fake Jin Young-seo or that she is his employee, which she assiduously tries to hide. However, Ha-ri's fake identity, but thankfully not her employment status, is soon exposed after the real Jin Young-seo confesses to Kang Tae-moo of 'hiring' an actress to impersonate her on her blind date with Tae-moo. She meets Cha Sung-hoon (Kim Min-kyu) during her exchange with Kang Tae-moo, and finds out that Sung-hoon is Tae-moo's secretary.

After Ha-ri's identity is exposed, Young-seo tricks Ha-ri into meeting with Tae-moo at his request. When he asks for her real name, Ha-ri lies and says that her name is Shin Geum-hui (the same name as the female lead of a popular fictional television series Be Strong, Geum-hui (굳세어라 금희야) (Note: Be Strong, Geum-hui is a popular fictional television series in Business Proposal. The series is a parody of the 2005 South Korean television series Be Strong, Geum-soon!.) to hide that she is his employee. Tae-moo bullies and bribes Ha-ri into pretending to be his fiancée in exchange for a payment of 800,000 won per date after his grandfather threatens to send him on countless blind dates. The cash-strapped Ha-ri desperately needs the money to bail out her consistently impecunious parents, so she accepts. During the course of fake dating, Ha-ri uses her new identity alongside a fake background, created for her by Tae-moo and Sunghoon, to make a good first impression on Tae-moo's grandfather. While the relationship starts out frosty and uncomfortable, the couple soon grows closer until Tae-moo finds out Ha-ri's real identity. Despite feeling betrayed, Tae-moo still loves Ha-ri and they later became a couple as he told Ha-ri he knew the truth of her identity.

Meantime, Young-seo moves out of her father's house to escape his demands to attend blind dates and finds out, in a comic moment involving a marauding cockroach, that she is now Sung-hoon's neighbor, the man with whom she had become infatuated at first sight after meeting him at a convenience store. While Young-seo is attracted to him, Sung-hoon is upset with her for deceiving his boss, so he constantly tries to avoid her. Still, he cannot further deny his growing affections for Young-seo when he realizes it eventually, and they get together.

== Cast ==
=== Main ===
- Ahn Hyo-seop as Kang Tae-moo
  - Park Jae-joon as young Kang Tae-moo

The new CEO of Go Food, a subsidiary of the chaebol founded by his grandfather. After graduating from Harvard University, he joined Go Food, worked at an overseas branch, and returned to Korea recently. He is forced to go on a blind date by his grandfather, who wants to see him get married.

- Kim Se-jeong as Shin Ha-ri

A researcher part of Go Food's Food Development Team 1. She disguises herself as a vixen after she accepts to replace her friend, Young-seo, on a blind date. She's smart and energetic, but insecure on how to tell her true feelings.

- Kim Min-kyu as Cha Sung-hoon

Tae-moo's chief secretary of Go Food. He grew up in an orphanage sponsored by Go Food's parent company, which was founded by Tae-moo's grandfather, and has become like a brother to Tae-moo.

- Seol In-ah as Jin Young-seo

Ha-ri's best friend and the only daughter of the chairman of Marine Group, the parent company of Marine Beauty, where she works as a marketing team leader. She asks Ha-ri to replace her on a blind date with Tae-moo, since she wants to wait for her true love.

=== Supporting ===
==== People around Tae-moo ====
- Lee Deok-hwa as Chairman Kang Da-goo

Kang Tae-moo's grandfather and the founder of Go Food's parent company, Geumhwa Group. He wants to see his grandson get married and thus he tries to send him on a blind date.

==== People around Ha-ri ====
- Choi Byung-chan as Shin Ha-min

Ha-ri's younger brother.

- Kim Kwang-kyu as Shin Joong-hae

Ha-ri and Ha-min's father. He and his wife own a chicken place.

- Jung Young-joo as Han Mi-mo

Ha-ri and Ha-min's mother. She and her husband own a chicken place.

- Song Won-seok as Lee Min-woo

Ha-ri's classmate in university and her unrequited love for seven years who works as a chef.

- Bae Woo-hee as Go Yoo-ra

Min-woo's girlfriend who works as a food stylist.

==== Go Food Employees ====
- Kim Hyun-sook as Yeo Eui-ju

The manager of Food Development Team 1, a talented career woman with a charming and strong personality.

- Lim Ki-hong as Gye-bin

The deputy manager of Food Development Team 1. He usually seeks any opportunities to advance in his career.

- Yoon Sang-jeong as Kim Hye-ji

An employee part of Food Development Team 1.

- Yoo Eui-tae as the leader of the Food Development Department.

==== Characters in Be Strong, Geum-hee ====
- Noeul as Shin Geum-hee

The first female lead in the popular fictional television "Be Strong, Geum-hui"

- Joo Hui-jae as Gwang-bok

The first male lead in the popular fictional television Be Strong, Geum-hui.

- Seo Kwon-sun as Ms. Oh

A character in the popular fictional television Be Strong, Geum-hui.

==== Others ====
- Seo Hye-won as Jo Yoo-jung

The director of Marine Beauty and cousin of Jin Young-seo. She and Young-seo are competitive around each other.

=== Special appearance ===
- Kim Won-sik as Mr. Park (Ep. 1)

He is the son of Chairman Kang Da-goo's close friend and a former director of Go Food. He got fired by Kang Tae-moo for taking bribes.

- MeloMance as themselves (Ep. 3)
- Lee Ki-young as Jin Young-seo's father (Ep. 3, 10–12)

The chairman of Marine Group.

- Lee Ki-hyuk as Shin Jung-woo (Ep. 4–6)

Jin Young-seo's neighbor who is a furniture designer.

- Tei as the owner of a hamburger truck (Ep. 6)
- Kim Young-ah as Jin Chae-rim (Ep. 8–9)

The director of Marine Art Museum, Jin Young-seo's aunt and Jo Yoo-jung's mother.

- Hwang Bo-ra as Hwang Bo-ra (Ep. 9)

A STN reporter who interviews Shin Ha-ri and Lee Min-woo.

- Kim Jung-young as "Mother", a nun and caretaker at the orphanage where Cha Sung-hoon grew up (Ep. 9–10)

== Production ==
=== Development ===
Business Proposal was initially released as a web novel on KakaoPage between 2017 and 2018 by writer HaeHwa, who gained a following since his debut as a writer in 2012 for the "unconventional" themes of his romance novels. His stories mostly focus on the emotional growth of women who were hurt by their families and how they healed from their wounds. The novels also deal with the difficulty of becoming independent from parents in South Korea. Regarding Business Proposal, HaeHwa said he wrote it "with the mindset that it's easy to read, the content is lively and it's good to make it into a web comic", therefore taking a more classical approach to the romance genre, while still making the main character Shin Ha-ri an "independent" woman. The web novel went viral, reaching a total of 450 million views worldwide, including 160 million in South Korea alone, by the end of February 2022. Due to its early popularity, it was subsequently released as a webtoon developed by illustrator Narak in 2018.

The series was created by StudioS, co-written by Han Seol-hee and Hong Bo-hee, directed by Park Seon-ho and co-produced by Kross Pictures and Kakao Entertainment. The series was director Park Seon-ho's first project as a freelancer after leaving SBS. Park admitted that he had concerns about how to explain Kang Tae-moo's inability to tell the difference between Shin Ha-ri and Shin Geum-hui, the fictitious identity Ha-ri uses to disguise herself. He and his team then decided to introduce new scenes, such as Ha-ri trying to avoid eye contact with Tae-moo and the chase scene with her slipper, an allusion to Cinderella, to "make the flow more natural and the story more realistic". Additional changes included highlighting Ha-ri's competence at her job to emphasize "that Tae-moo would be unable to match Ha-ri and Geum-hui because of his strong impression". Screenwriter Han Seol-hee, better known for her work on comedy series, affirmed that what sets Business Proposal aside from other "contract marriages" storylines is its "unique sense of humour". She considers it the most important element and, as a result, Han said she placed less importance on the chemistry of the characters in order to keep the focus on the jokes while writing the script.

=== Casting and filming ===
Between March and May 2021, media reported that Ahn Hyo-seop and Kim Se-jeong had received offers to appear in the television series and were considering them. In the second half of 2021, Kakao Entertainment confirmed the casting of both actors, while Seol In-ah and Kim Min-kyu's respective agencies announced that they both would star on the show. Over the next few months, Kim Kwang-kyu, Jung Young-joo and Yoon Sang-jeong were cast in supporting roles, while screenwriter Han Seol-hee directly recommended Kim Hyun-sook, with whom she had previously worked on Ugly Miss Young-ae. On January 18, 2022, photos of the script-reading were released. Some of the filming locations for the drama include Yongin Daejanggeum Park, Heyri Art Valley and the 1004 Yacht in Sinan County.

=== Release ===
Business Proposal was originally scheduled to premiere on February 21, 2022. However, the filming schedule changed due to the COVID-19 pandemic and the premiere date was postponed for one week to February 28. Business Proposal aired on SBS TV for 12 episodes every Monday and Tuesday at 22:00 (KST) till April 5, 2022. The drama was also released on Netflix in selected regions on February 21, 2022.

A special episode consisting of popular scenes from the first six episodes was broadcast on March 19, 2022, with commentary from the main cast.

== Soundtrack ==
=== Album ===
A Business Proposal

Soundtrack album by Various Artists
- Released: April 6, 2022
- Length: 90:57
- Language: Korean
- Label: Kakao Entertainment

Singles from Business Proposal
- 1. "Sweet" Released: February 28, 2022; 2. "You Are Mine" Released: March 6, 2022; 3. "Sun Shower" Released: March 8, 2022; 4. "Melting" Released: March 9, 2022; 5. "Love, Maybe" Released: March 14, 2022; 6. "Fall in Love" Released: March 20, 2022; 7. "Closer" Released: March 22, 2022; 8. "Whatever You Want" Released: March 28, 2022; 9. "Spring Breeze" Released: March 29, 2022; 10. "It's Up To You" Released: April 3, 2022

The soundtrack album for Business Proposal – coordinated and written by music director Park Se-joon – includes 12 songs, of which ten were previously released as singles throughout the drama's airing, and 23 score pieces. Notably, the album features songs by Seo Jae-ha, Kim Young-seong, and Han Jun. It was digitally released on April 6, 2022, after the ending of the series. Pre-orders for the physical version started on March 28, 2022, and the album was officially released on April 19.

The album peaked at number 11 on the Gaon Album Chart and as of April 2022, 14,499 copies have been sold.

==== Tracklist ====
CD 1
No.	Title	Lyrics	Music	Artist	Length
1.	"Love, Maybe" (사랑인가 봐)	Kim Min-seok	MeloMance	MeloMance	3:05
2.	"Sweet" (스윗해)	Gadeul	Anne; Maxx Song; Wonjun	Lee Mu-jin	3:36
3.	"You Are Mine"	Gadeul	Aaron Kim; Isaac Han; Walter Pok; D'tour	Victon	3:27
4.	"Sun Shower" (여우비)	Ha Joon; Park Se-joon	Seo Jae-ha; Kim Young-seong; Park Se-joon	Movning	4:16
5.	"Melting"	Gadeul; Zaydro	Zaydro	BamBam (Got7)	3:04
6.	"Love, Maybe" (사랑인가 봐)	Kim Min-seok	MeloMance	Dita, Zuu, Soodam (Secret Number)	3:05
7.	"Fall in Love" (사랑이 내 안에 들어와)	Lee Da-hyun	Ranic; Lee Da-hyun	Jihan (Weeekly); Park So-eun (Weeekly)	3:19
8.	"Closer"	Woo Ji-hoon	Woo Ji-hoon	Song Ha-yea	3:58
9.	"Whatever You Want"	Han Seung-yun; Gadeul	Han Seung-yun	Han Seung-yun	4:16
10.	"Spring Breeze" (봄바람처럼 날 찾아와)	Gadeul	Park Young-min; Yoon Byung-joo; Ko Deok-joon	New (The Boyz)	3:44
11.	"It's Up To You"	Park Se-joon; Han Jun	Red Socks; Inan	Moon Su-jin	4:28
12.	"Love, Maybe" (사랑인가 봐; Acoustic version)	Kim Min-seok	MeloMance	Kim Se-jeong	3:05
Total length:					43:23

CD 2
No.	Title	Music	Length
1.	"Be Mine"	Woo Ji-hoon; Park Se-joon	1:05
2.	"Cream Shake"	Kim Min-ji; Park Se-joon	2:00
3.	"Forest Of Memories"	Lee Nyeom; Park Se-joon	2:42
4.	"Never Ending Falling Down"	Woo Ji-hoon; Park Se-joon	2:01
5.	"Peaches On The Bed"	Song Jin-seok; Hwang Seung-pil	1:39
6.	"Modern Show"	Song Jae-kyung; Park Se-joon	1:34
7.	"To Find You"	Kim Dong-hyuk; Choi Moon-seok	2:57
8.	"Awkward Situation"	Yoo Hee-hyun; Park Se-joon	1:44
9.	"In The West"	Na Sang-jin; Park Se-joon	1:51
10.	"Damn It"	Kim Tae-hwan; Park Se-joon	1:52
11.	"Let Us Go"	Woo Ji-hoon; Park Se-joon	1:38
12.	"Lemonade"	Kim Min-ji; Park Se-joon	1:23
13.	"Ullala Ullala"	Kim Dong-hyuk; Choi Moon-seok	1:52
14.	"My Honey Dream"	Lee Nyeom; Park Se-joon	3:33
15.	"After All"	Yu Hui-hyeon; Park Se-joon	3:27
16.	"BongKuRa"	Kim Tae-hwan; Park Se-joon	2:01
17.	"Candle Light"	Na Yoon-sik; Park Se-joon	2:45
18.	"Hi Kid"	Woo Ji-hoon; Park Se-joon	1:20
19.	"My Beauty"	Gim Dong-hyuk; Choi Moon-seok	2:01
20.	"Samba Girl"	Kim Min-ji	1:53
21.	"God Of Love"	Lee Nyeom	2:17
22.	"Terrible Mistake"	Song Jin-seok; Hwang Seung-pil	1:52
23.	"Acoustic Romance"	Woo Ji-hoon; Park Se-joon	2:07
Total length:			47:34

=== Singles ===
Ten singles were released from the album from February 28 to April 3, 2022. "Sweet" by Lee Mu-jin was the first single to be released and it peaked at number 169 on the Gaon Digital Chart. A special track, "Love, Maybe", written and sung by MeloMance was released on February 18, before the drama's airing. The song was commercially successful, debuting on the Gaon Digital Chart at number 148 and peaking at number four. It also peaked at number six on Billboard's K-pop Hot 100. On April 4, 2022, lead actress Kim Se-jeong shared a clip of her and co-star Ahn Hyo-seop singing the song together, which went viral on Twitter. The next day, an acoustic version of "Love, Maybe" sung by Sejeong was released as a bonus track. The track peaked at number 108 on the Gaon Digital Chart.

==== Chart performance ====
List of singles, showing year released, and selected chart positions
Title	Year	Peak chart positions	
Title	Year	KOR	
Title	Year	Gaon	Hot
"Sweet" (스윗해) (Sung by Lee Mu-jin)	2022	169	—
"Love, Maybe" (사랑인가 봐) (Sung by MeloMance)	2022	4	6
"Love, Maybe" (사랑인가 봐; Acoustic version) (Sung by Kim Se-jeong)	2022	108	—
"—" denotes a recording that did not chart or was not released in that territory

== Reception ==
=== Commercial success ===
During its airing, Business Proposal almost doubled its television ratings, recording its highest rating in the ninth episode. According to Nielsen Korea, the series recorded a rating of 11.4% in its last episode. It also topped the Content Power Index (CPI) report with 357.7 points in the first week of April 2022. After its release on Netflix, Business Proposal debuted at number 6 on the platform's weekly viewership chart of non-English TV shows in the week of March 7 to 13. The following week it rose to number one, where it stayed for three weeks, recording 32.5 million hours of viewing for the week of March 28 to April 3 alone. It became the first Korean series produced and originally released by a local company to top the chart. The drama was particularly successful in Asia, ranking as the top series in multiple countries including Indonesia, Japan, Thailand, Vietnam, Hong Kong, Malaysia, Philippines and Singapore, while placing at number two in India and Sri Lanka, for the week of March 28 to April 3.

Following the series's success, Kakao Entertainment reported that the webtoon was now the second most popular romantic comic ever released on Kakao's platform, while the views for the original web novel increased tenfold. Furthermore, both held the top two spots for most viewed stories on Kakao's platform during the drama's airing.

=== Critical response ===
Despite the initial concerns of adapting a webtoon into a drama, Business Proposal received positive feedback for its way of embracing the clichés of the romcom genre and turning them into "slapstick comedy". Quincy LeGardye of Vulture identified at least ten typical tropes of the romance genre used for either of the two main couples presented in the series and commented that the drama makes "smart decisions" about which to subvert and which to embrace. The familiarity of the story, derived from using common clichés, alongside its "unique and lovely" characters were named the strengths of the series.

The series was also praised for its way of depicting the issue of molka in South Korea. Jin Young-seo becomes a victim of illegal filming when her neighbor places a spy cam in a lamp he gave her as a housewarming gift. While often in fiction the victim reacts "passively" and lets others handle the situation for her, in the series Young-seo reports the crime to the police and brings evidence with her. It's also made clear that the punishment under the current South Korean law for the crime isn't enough through the words of the police officer who Young-seo speaks to. Furthermore, in many television series, the fictional illegal recordings are frequently broadcast, usually showing the woman losing consciousness and sometimes exposing parts of her body. Instead, Business Proposal avoids portraying the situation explicitly. After the incident, Young-seo goes through trauma and, as a result, she isn't able to use public bathrooms for fear of being filmed, showing how difficult it is for victims to overcome the pain. However, some parts were considered "disappointing". With his influence as a second-generation member of a chaebol family, the male main character Kang Tae-moo manages to gather the testimonies of Young-seo's neighbor's other victims and sues him, also buying out the company where he works at and firing him. The woman has to rely on a man at the end, while it "would have left a more pleasant feeling" if she had "avenged" herself. Furthermore, it was criticized how the situation led to Young-seo's romance with Cha Sung-hoon.

=== Viewership ===
Business Proposal : South Korea viewers per episode (millions)

Season	Episode number												Average
Season	1	2	3	4	5	6	7	8	9	10	11	12	Average
1	0.835	1.273	1.458	1.589	1.535	1.866	1.837	2.138	2.124	2.149	2.016	2.106	1.744

Source: Audience measurement performed nationwide by Nielsen Korea.

Average TV viewership ratings
Ep.	Original broadcast date	Average audience share		
Ep.	Original broadcast date	Nielsen Korea		TNmS
Ep.	Original broadcast date	Nationwide	Seoul	Nationwide
1	February 28, 2022	4.9% (17th)	5.4% (15th)	4.9% (17th)
2	March 1, 2022	6.5% (12th)	7.2% (11th)	6.1% (14th)
3	March 7, 2022	8.1% (6th)	8.2% (5th)	5.9% (12th)
4	March 8, 2022	8.7% (4th)	8.9%(4th)	6.9% (9th)
5	March 14, 2022	8.1% (6th)	8.6% (4th)	7.6% (10th)
6	March 15, 2022	10.1% (4th)	10.5% (3rd)	8.5% (7th)
7	March 21, 2022	9.9% (4th)	10.7% (4th)	9.1% (7th)
8	March 22, 2022	10.8% (3rd)	11.6% (3rd)	9.2% (6th)
9	March 28, 2022	11.6% (4th)	12.4% (4th)	8.7% (7th)
10	March 29, 2022	11.6% (3rd)	12.1% (3rd)	9.8% (5th)
11	April 4, 2022	10.6% (4th)	11.0% (4th)	9.2% (6th)
12	April 5, 2022	11.4% (4th)	11.9% (3rd)	9.7% (5th)
Average		9.36%	9.88%	7.97%
In the table above, the blue numbers represent the lowest ratings and the red numbers represent the highest ratings.

== Accolades ==
=== Awards and nominations ===
Name of the award ceremony, year presented, category, nominee of the award, and the result of the nomination
Award ceremony	Year	Category	Nominee / Work	Result	Ref.
APAN Star Awards	2022	Best Couple	Kim Se-jeong and Ahn Hyo-seop	Nominated	
APAN Star Awards	2022	Best Original Soundtrack	"Love, Maybe"; MeloMance	Nominated	
APAN Star Awards	2022	Best Original Soundtrack	"Sweet"; Lee Mu-jin	Nominated	
APAN Star Awards	2022	Excellence Award, Actor in a Miniseries	Ahn Hyo-seop	Nominated	
APAN Star Awards	2022	Excellence Award, Actress in a Miniseries	Kim Se-jeong	Nominated	
Korea Drama Awards	2022	Best New Actress	Bae Woo-hee	Won	
MAMA Awards	2022	Best OST	"Love, Maybe"; MeloMance	Won	
SBS Drama Awards	2022	Best Couple	Kim Se-jeong and Ahn Hyo-seop	Won	
SBS Drama Awards	2022	Best Couple	Kim Min-kyu and Seol In-ah	Won	
SBS Drama Awards	2022	Excellence Award, Actor in a Miniseries Romance/Comedy Drama	Kim Min-kyu	Won	
SBS Drama Awards	2022	Top Excellence Award, Actor in a Miniseries Romance/Comedy Drama	Ahn Hyo-seop	Won	
SBS Drama Awards	2022	Top Excellence Award, Actress in a Miniseries Romance/Comedy Drama	Kim Se-jeong	Won	
SBS Drama Awards	2022	Best Supporting Team	Yoon Sang-jeong, Kim Se-jeong, Kim Hyun-sook and Lim Ki-hong	Nominated	
SBS Drama Awards	2022	Excellence Award, Actress in a Miniseries Romance/Comedy Drama	Seol In-ah	Nominated	

=== Listicles ===
Name of publisher, year listed, name of listicle, and placement
Publisher	Year	Listicle	Placement	Ref.
Entertainment Weekly	2025	The 21 best Korean shows on Netflix to watch now	Top 21	

== Adaptation ==
ViuTV acquired the rights to remake Business Proposal. Starring Mirror members Anson Lo and Edan Lui, the adaptation premiered on ViuTV and on the streaming platform Viu on November 27, 2023.

An Indian remake in two languages was reported to be in development as of 2023.

An Indonesian remake of the series has been announced as a film and has been released on February 6, 2025.

A Chinese remake is in development, with a release date yet to be announced.
