= Oh Ha-young =

South Korean singer (born 1996)

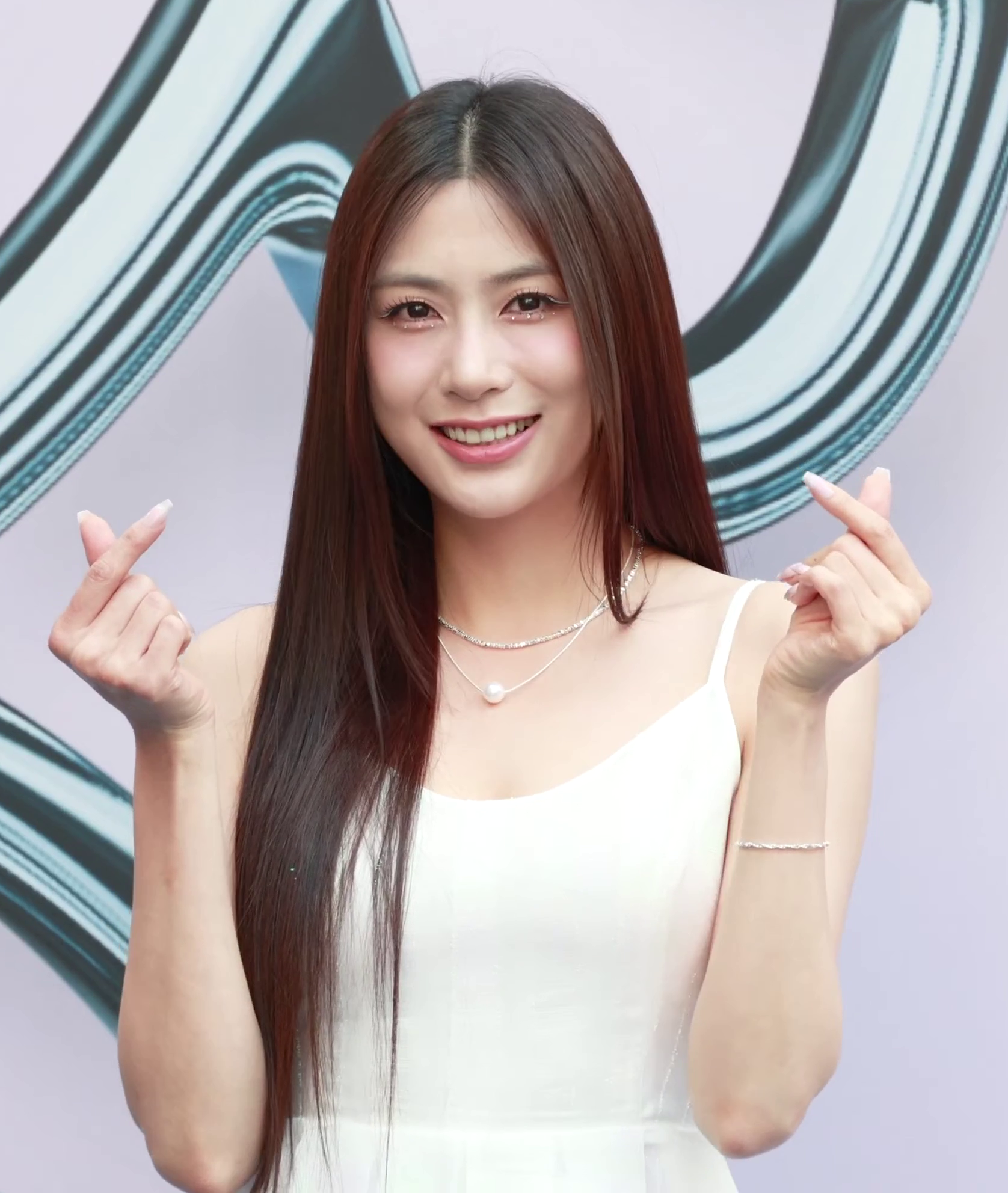
- Oh in September 2024
- Born: Oh Ha-young; July 19, 1996 (age 30); Seoul, South Korea
- Education: School of Performing Arts Seoul
- Occupations: Singer; actress
- Musical career
- Genre: K-pop
- Instrument: Vocals
- Years active: 2011–present
- Labels: IST; Choi Creative Lab; With Us Entertainment
- Member of: Apink

Korean name
- Hangul: 오하영
- RR: O Hayeong
- MR: O Hayŏng

Oh Ha-young (Korean: 오하영; born July 19, 1996), also known by her mononym Hayoung, is a South Korean singer and actress. She is best known as a member of the South Korean girl group Apink.

== Life and career ==
=== 1996–2011: Early life and debut with Apink ===
Oh Ha-young was born on July 19, 1996, in Seoul, South Korea. During her school days, she attended Seoul Yangcheon District's Shinwol Middle School where she graduated in 2012, and School of Performing Arts Seoul where she graduated in 2015. During her seventh grade, she auditioned for Cube Entertainment where she later on became a trainee, and eventually became a part of Cube Entertainment's then-independent label A Cube Entertainment (now called IST Entertainment). Oh decided not to pursue college after high school to concentrate on Apink's promotions.

Oh was introduced as the third member of girl group Apink on February 21, 2011. She debuted with Apink on Mnet's M Countdown on April 21, 2011, performing their songs "I Don't Know" (몰라요) and "Wishlist", which were included on their debut EP Seven Springs of Apink.

=== 2013–2018: Acting career, variety shows, and individual endeavors ===
In 2013, Oh played the female lead in the music video for Huh Gak's song "1440". Oh has also played the female lead in Shin Bora's single "Frozen" along with B1A4's CNU, the male lead.

Aside from Apink's activities, Oh has participated in various variety and acting projects. In 2014, she began her variety appearance as MC in the variety show Weekly Idol along with Apink co-member Bomi for some episodes. In July 2014, she was featured in the music video for Jiggy Dogg's single "The Best Thing I Did". In August 2015, she was appointed as co-MC on Weekly Idol along with AOA's Mina and VIXX's N, starting from September 2. In 2016, she was cast in the female edition of the reality show Law of the Jungle filmed in Papua New Guinea. Throughout her career as a singer, besides vocal contribution to Apink's songs, Oh has ventured into songwriting: she penned the lyrics for "What a Boy Wants" (2015) and co-wrote with Eunji their duet single "It's You" (2016).

In November 2016, Oh was cast in the two-episode web drama Brother Jeongnam, which later changed title into Please Find Her and aired on KBS2 and KBS World on March 1, 2017.

In 2018, she was cast in the Naver TV Cast's six-episode sci-fi romance web drama Love, Stay in Memory (사랑, 기억에 머물다), which was released from February 14 to 19. She reprised her role of female lead Yoo Ha-ri, an aspiring actress, in the sequel Love, Stay in Time (사랑, 시간에 머물다), which was made available on Danaflix on June 25 and screened nationwide at Danaflix cinemas for four weeks starting on June 27, 2018.

=== 2019–present: Debut as a solo artist with Oh! ===
Oh made her official debut as a solo artist on August 21, 2019, with the release of the eponymous extended play Oh! and its accompanying title track, "Don't Make Me Laugh". The debut album peaked at number 8 on Korea's Gaon Album Chart and would go on to sell 9,083 physical copies nationwide in 2019. "Don't Make Me Laugh" failed to chart on the Gaon Digital Chart but did peak at number 97 on the Gaon Download Chart. Oh is the second Apink member after main vocalist Jung Eunji to debut officially as a soloist.

In May 2020, Oh was featured in the official soundtrack of the KBS2 drama Soul Mechanic, singing the show's leading single, "I'm Fine".

On April 28, 2023, IST Entertainment announced that Oh did not renew her contract with the company but will still be part of Apink. On the same day, Oh signed an exclusive contract with Choi Creative Lab.

== Discography ==
=== Extended plays ===
Title	EP details	Peak chart positions	Sales
Title	EP details	KOR	Sales
Oh!	Released: August 21, 2019 (KOR); Label: Play M Entertainment; Formats: CD, digital download, streaming	8	KOR: 9,083

=== Singles ===
Title	Year	Peak chart positions	Sales	Album
Title	Year	KOR	Sales	Album
As lead artist
"Don't Make Me Laugh"	2019	—	—N/a	Oh!
Collaborations
"With A Song" (with JeA, Cheetah, Seo Eun-kwang, Parc Jae-jung)	2020	—	—N/a	Non-album singles
"Pine Tree" (with Sarang)	2021	—	—N/a	Non-album singles
Soundtrack appearances
"I'm Fine"	2020	—	—N/a	Soul Mechanic OST Part. 1
"Couple"	2021	—	—N/a	Start Dating OST Part. 5
"—" denotes releases that did not chart or were not released in that region.

=== Songwriting credits ===
All song credits are adapted from the Korea Music Copyright Association's database, unless otherwise noted.

Year	Artist	Title	Album	Lyrics		Music	
Year	Artist	Title	Album	Credited	With	Credited	With
2015	Apink	"What A Boy Wants"	Pink Memory	Yes	AK47	No	
2016	Apink	"Dear (Whisper)"	Dear	Yes	Apink	Yes	Apink
2016	Apink	"It's You" (그 봄날, 이 가을)	Dear	Yes	Jung Eun-ji	No	
2019	Oh Ha-young	"Worry About Nothing"	Oh!	Yes		No	
2022	Apink	"Trip"	Horn	Yes	Zigzag Note, Kang Myeong-sin, No Eun-jong	No	
2022	Apink	"I Want You to Be Happy" (나만 알면 돼)	Non-album single	Yes	Apink	No	

== Filmography ==
=== Film ===
Year	Title	Role	Notes	Ref.
2018	Love, Stay in Time	Yoo Ha-ri	Web Film	

=== Television series ===
Year	Title	Role	Notes	Ref.
2017	Please Find Her	Go Ha-young		
2022	The Driver		Cameo	

=== Web series ===
Year	Title	Role	Ref.
2018	Love, Stay in Memory	Yoo Ha-ri	
2021	Starting Point of Dating	Choi Soo-yeon	

=== Television shows ===
Year	Title	Role	Notes	Ref.
2017	Battle Trip	Special MC	Episode 68–69	
2017	Battle Trip	Contestant	with Chorong (Episode 74–75)	
2018	Secret Sister	Co-host	with Hyoyeon	
2018	Pajama Friends	Host	with Cheng Xiao (Episode 8–9)	
2023	Boss in the Mirror	Special MC		

=== Radio shows ===
Year	Title	Role	Notes	Ref.
2022	Dream Radio	Special DJ	March 21–27, 2022; with Yoon Bo-mi	
