= Huh Gak =

South Korean singer (born 1984)

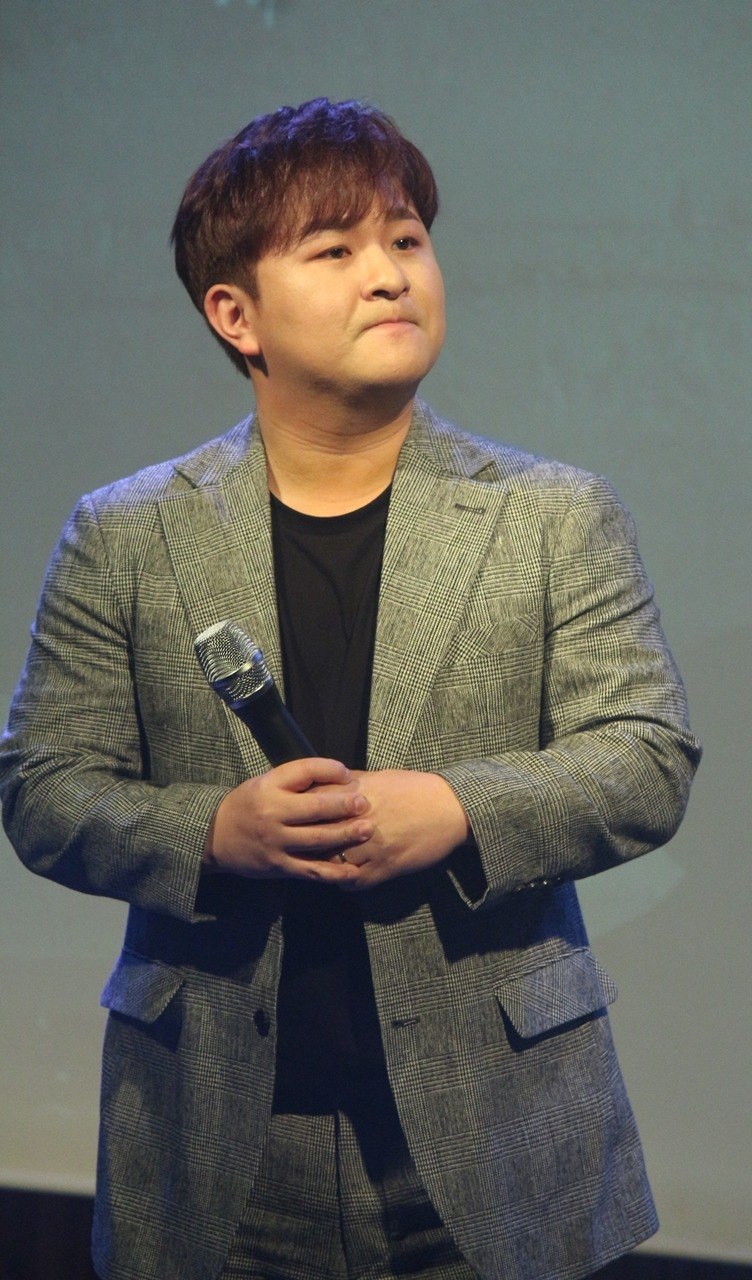
- Huh at Lover Letter showcare event on 31 January 2017

Background information
- Born: 15 November 1984 (age 41); Incheon, South Korea
- Genres: K-pop; R&B
- Years active: 2010–present
- Labels: Play M; BPM

Korean name
- Hangul: 허각
- RR: Heo Gak
- MR: Hŏ Kak

Huh Gak (Korean: 허각; born 15 November 1984) is a South Korean singer. He rose to fame after winning the 2010 Mnet talent competition series Superstar K 2, during which he became known as "the Korean Paul Potts".

== Early life and education ==
Huh Gak was born in Incheon, South Korea on 15 November 1984. His parents divorced when he was 3, and he and his twin brother, Huh Gong, were raised by their father. Due to his family's financial difficulties, Huh dropped out of school after finishing middle school and worked as a repairman and event singer. Huh later earned his high school diploma in 2018.

== Career ==
=== 2010–present: Superstar K 2, debut, and First Story ===
In 2010, Huh competed on the Mnet talent competition series Superstar K 2 and took the first place spot in the show's finale in October. Following the show, Huh released his debut single "Always", which topped the Gaon Digital Chart. On 16 November, he released his self-titled, first mini album.

After joining A Cube Entertainment in early 2011, Huh released the mini album First Story on 16 September. The album spawned the hit single "Hello", which took the number-one spot on the Gaon Digital Chart (also earning a "triple crown" for topping the component Download, Streaming, and BGM charts) and Billboard's K-pop Hot 100 chart.

On 8 October 2021, Huh left Play M Entertainment after his contract expired. On 27 October 2021, Huh signed with BPM Entertainment.

== Personal life ==
On 3 October 2013, Huh married his "first love", whom he dated in middle school when they were 16 years old. They met again after 13 years in February 2012. Huh and his wife have two sons: Huh Geon (born 2014) and Huh Gang (born 2015).

== Discography ==
=== Studio albums ===
Title	Album details	Peak chart positions	Sales
Title	Album details	KOR	Sales
Little Giant	Released: 5 February 2013; Label: A Cube Entertainment, LOEN Entertainment; Formats: CD, digital download	14	KOR: 4,198
Hello	Released: 28 December 2020; Label: Play M Entertainment, Kakao M; Formats: CD, digital download	61	—N/a

=== Extended plays ===
Title	EP details	Peak chart positions	Sales
Title	EP details	KOR	Sales
Huh Gak 1st Mini Album	Released: 16 November 2010; Label: Mnet Media, CJ E&M; Formats: CD, digital download	6	—N/a
Like 1st Mini Album "First Story"	Released: 16 September 2011; Label: A Cube Entertainment, LOEN Entertainment; Formats: CD, digital download	4	KOR: 13,059
Lacrimoso	Released: 3 April 2012; Label: A Cube Entertainment, LOEN Entertainment; Formats: CD, digital download	9	KOR: 3,357
Reminisce	Released: 11 November 2013; Label: A Cube Entertainment, LOEN Entertainment; Formats: CD, digital download	—	—N/a
Snow of April	Released: 17 March 2015; Label: A Cube Entertainment, LOEN Entertainment; Formats: CD, digital download	13	KOR: 1,072+
Story of Winter	Released: 23 November 2015; Label: A Cube Entertainment, LOEN Entertainment; Formats: CD, digital download	23	KOR: 740+
Lover Letter	Released: 31 January 2017; Label: Plan A Entertainment, LOEN Entertainment; Formats: CD, digital download	34	—N/a
"—" denotes releases that did not chart.

=== Singles ===
Title	Year	Peak chart positions	Sales	Album
Title	Year	KOR	Sales	Album
"Always" (언제나)	2010	1	KOR: 1,753,708	Huh Gak 1st Mini Album
"Hello"	2011	1	KOR: 3,583,763	Like 1st Mini Album "First Story"
"I Told You I Wanna Die" (죽고 싶단 말 밖에)	2011	2	KOR: 2,494,120	Lacrimoso
"The Person Who Once Loved Me" (나를 사랑했던 사람아)	2012	4	KOR: 2,500,000	Lacrimoso
"It Hurts" (아프다)	2012	7	KOR: 982,196	Non-album single
"1440"	2013	5	KOR: 1,016,420	Little Giant
"I Want to Love" (사랑하고 싶어서)	2013	21	KOR: 257,911	Little Giant
"You Are Mine" (넌 내꺼라는걸) (feat. Swings)	2013	1	KOR: 676,064	Non-album single
"Memory of Your Scent" (향기만 남아)	2013	3	KOR: 911,978	Reminisce
"Day N Night" (feat. Simon Dominic)	2014	9	KOR: 210,995	Non-album single
"Snow of April" (사월의 눈)	2015	1	KOR: 1,049,002	Snow of April
"Up All Night" (밤을 새)	2015	7	KOR: 320,211	Story of Winter
"Back in the Day" (그날을 내 등 뒤로)	2015	6	KOR: 235,820	Story of Winter
"Miss You" (혼자, 한잔)	2017	23	KOR: 170,414	Love Letter
"Only You" (바보야)	2017	9	KOR: 219,810	Hello
"The Last Night" (마지막으로 안아도 될까)	2018	51	—N/a	Hello
"Empty Words" (흔한 이별)	2018	17	—N/a	Hello
"Without You" (듣고 싶던 말)	2020	76	—N/a	Hello
"How Did We" (우린 어쩌다 헤어진 걸까)	2020	34	—N/a	Hello
"Confession" (고백)	2021	10	—N/a	Romance 101 X Huh Gak
"I Can't Go to Sinchon" (신촌을 못가)	2021	54	—N/a	Non-album singles
"Save Me" (구해줘)	2022	137	—N/a	Non-album singles
"Apgujeong Rodeo" (압구정로데오)	2022	164	—N/a	Non-album singles
"Endless"	2023	88	—N/a	Non-album singles
"The Work of Erasing You" (너 하나 빼는 일)	2023	156	—N/a	Non-album singles
"With You" (물론)	2023	14	—N/a	Non-album singles
"Sob Your Heart Out" (운다 운다)	2023	107	—N/a	Non-album singles
"It's You" (사랑인걸)	2024	113	—N/a	Non-album singles
"To Heaven" (천국으로 보낸 편지)	2024	151	—N/a	Non-album singles
"I'm in Tears" (눈물이 왈칵 쏟아진다)	2024	148	—N/a	Non-album singles
"Too Late to Love You" (사랑은 언제나 걸음이 느려서)	2025	147	—N/a	Non-album singles
"Only" (단)	2025	171	—N/a	Non-album singles
"Get Ready to Leave" (떠나보낼 준비해 둘걸 그랬어) (featuring Onestar)	2025	182	—N/a	Non-album singles
"Crazy Love Song" (미친 사랑의 노래)	2026	199	—N/a	Non-album singles

=== Collaborations ===
Title	Year	Peak chart positions	Sales
Title	Year	KOR	Sales
"Whenever You Play That Song" (그 노래를 들때마다) with LE	2011	3	KOR: 2,228,493
"I Need You" with Zia	2012	1	KOR: 2,500,000
"Short Hair" (짧은머리) with Jung Eun-ji	2013	1	KOR: 1,207,766
"Break Up to Make Up" (이제 그만 싸우자) with Jung Eun-ji	2014	1	KOR: 803,627
"Town Bar" (동네술집) with Jungin	2015	5	KOR: 462,234
"Already Winter" (벌써 겨울) with Vromance	2016	60	KOR: 81,008
"Bada Ocean.wav" (바다) with Jung Eun-ji	2016	5	KOR: 407,547
"#Begin Again" (#떨려) with Plan A Boys	2016	—	KOR: 17,447
"Band-Aid" (반창고) with MC Mong	2017	22	KOR: 171,574
"Oasis" (오아시스) with Apink, Victon	2017	—	KOR: 22,488
"Let You Go" (이별은 늘 그렇게) with Eunji	2019	34	—N/a
"Rain" with 2F	2021	—	—N/a
"Drunken Night" (술이 뭐길래) with Zia	2022	74	—N/a
"My First Love (Would You Marry Me)" (나와 결혼해 줄래요) with 2F, Onestar, Son Dong-woon, Joo Ho and Kim Hee Jae	2022	159	—N/a
"Happiness" with Shin Yong Jae and Onestar as HYB	2023	105	—N/a
"The Winter" (그 겨울엔 네가 있어) with Shin Yong Jae and Onestar as HYB	2023	151	—N/a
"I Hope" (좋겠다) with Park Bo-ram	2024	140	—N/a
"Because of Love" (사랑을 하기는 했나 봐) with Zia	2024	138	—N/a
"Old Song" (오래된 노래) with Lee Mu-jin, Onestar, Lee Jin-sung, Kim Hee-jae and An Nyeong	2024	27	—N/a
"T.B.H" (Ballad ver.; 고민중독) with Shin Yong Jae and Onestar as HYB	2024	78	—N/a

=== Soundtrack appearances ===
Title	Year	Peak chart positions		Sales	Album
Title	Year	KOR	US World	Sales	Album
"My Best" with John Park	2011	43	—	—N/a	Glove OST
"Don't Forget Me" (나를 잊지 말아요)	2011	1	—	KOR: 2,505,076	The Greatest Love OST
"One Person" (한사람)	2012	2	—	KOR: 1,653,310	Big OST
"Tears Fallin' Like Today" (오늘 같은 눈물이)	2014	2	—	KOR: 745,484	My Love from the Star OST
"The Reasons" (너란 이유)	2017	—	—	KOR: 30,999	Man to Man OST
"Since I Met You" (그댈 만난 이후로)	2017	—	—	—N/a	Andante OST
"Cosmos"	2018	—	—	—N/a	Clean with Passion for Now OST
"Because of You"	2019	—	—	—N/a	Angel's Last Mission: Love OST
"Your Warmth" (너의 온기)	2019	—	—	—N/a	The Tale of Nokdu OST
"Farewell In Tears" (눈물로 너를 떠나보낸다)	2020	—	—	—N/a	The World of the Married OST
"Someday" (그 시간, 그 공간)	2021	—	—	—N/a	Hello, Me! OST
"Under the Lonely Sky" (하늘 아래 그대와)	2021	—	—	—N/a	Undercover OST
"Stay with Me" (있어줘요)	2025	160	6	—N/a	Bon Appétit, Your Majesty OST

=== Other charted songs ===
Title	Year	Peak chart positions	Sales	Album
Title	Year	KOR	Sales	Album
"My Heart"	2010	44	—N/a	Huh Gak 1st Mini Album
"Running in the Sky" (하늘을 달리다)	2010	10	—N/a	Huh Gak 1st Mini Album
"Happy Me" (행복한 나를) with John Park	2010	16	—N/a	Huh Gak 1st Mini Album
"I Miss You" (니가 그립다)	2011	29	KOR: 362,518	Like 1st Mini Album "First Story"
"All of My Life" (평생의 전부)	2011	36	KOR: 248,689	Like 1st Mini Album "First Story"
"Before Farewell" (옷깃을 붙잡고) with Huu	2011	55	KOR: 172,334	Like 1st Mini Album "First Story"
"Love Love Love" (사랑 사랑 사랑)	2012	56	KOR: 60,558	Lacrimoso
"Grabbing Your Wrist" (손목을 쥔다)	2012	56	KOR: 56,943	Lacrimoso
"Monodrama" (모노드라마) feat. Yoo Seung-woo	2013	2	KOR: 1,645,880	Little Giant
"Knowing We're Going To Break Up" (헤어질걸 알기에) with Jung Eun-ji	2013	29	KOR: 234,885	Little Giant
"Your Wedding" (술 한잔하면)	2013	42	KOR: 119,320	Little Giant
"Simple Story" (간단한 이야기) feat. Miryo	2013	47	KOR: 89,041	Little Giant
"I'll Become Tears" (눈물이 되어줄게)	2013	62	KOR: 41,027	Little Giant
"I Want To Sing" (노래하고 싶다)	2013	71	KOR: 39,002	Little Giant
"Unemployed" (백수가)	2013	91	KOR: 31,352	Little Giant
"Time To Say I Love You" (오늘만은 말할게)	2013	50	KOR: 38,390	Reminisce
"Falling" (사랑했다)	2013	53	KOR: 38,347	Reminisce
"Linger On" (여운)	2015	49	KOR: 39,756	Snow Of April
"After Love" (사랑아)	2015	57	KOR: 34,184	Snow Of April
"Miss You" (그리워합니다)	2015	29	KOR: 49,615	Story of Winter
"A Bride" (없었던 것처럼)	2017	86	KOR: 20,630	Lover Letter

== Concerts ==
As well as numerous appearances on Superstar K2, on 18 January 2011, he participated in a Traditional Korean music concert called "Noon concert".

== Filmography ==
=== Television ===
Year	Title	Role	Notes	Ref.
2010	Superstar K 2	Contestant	Winner	
2022	The Listen: The Voice We Loved	Cast member		

== Awards and nominations ==
Award ceremony	Year	Category	Nominee(s)	Result	Ref.
Cyworld Digital Music Awards	2010	Song of the Month – November	"As Always"	Won	
Cyworld Digital Music Awards	2010	Rookie of the Month – November	"As Always"	Won	
Gaon Chart Music Awards	2011	New Artist of the Year – Male Solo	Huh Gak	Won	
Golden Disc Awards	2012	Rookie Artist of the Year	Huh Gak	Won	
Golden Disc Awards	2013	Digital Song Bonsang	"The Person Who Once Loved Me"	Won	
Golden Disc Awards	2013	Digital Daesang (Song of the Year)	"The Person Who Once Loved Me"	Nominated	
Golden Disc Awards	2014	Digital Song Bonsang	"Monodrama" (feat. Yoo Seung-woo)	Nominated	
Golden Disc Awards	2016	Digital Song Bonsang	"Snow of April"	Nominated	
Golden Disc Awards	2022	Digital Song Bonsang	"How Did We"	Nominated	
Korea Culture and Entertainment Awards	2015	K-pop Singer Award	Huh Gak	Won	
Korea Drama Awards	2011	Best Original Soundtrack	"Don't Forget Me"	Won	
Korea Drama Awards	2012	Best Original Soundtrack	"One Person"	Nominated	
Melon Music Awards	2010	Hot Trend Award	"Always"	Nominated	
Melon Music Awards	2011	Best New Artist	Huh Gak	Won	
Melon Music Awards	2012	Top 10 Artists (Bonsang)	Huh Gak	Won	
Melon Music Awards	2012	Best OST Award	"One Person"	Nominated	
Melon Music Awards	2012	Hot Trend Award	"I Need You" (with Zia)	Nominated	
Melon Music Awards	2013	Best R&B/Ballad Award	"Monodrama" (feat. Yoo Seung-woo)	Won	
Melon Music Awards	2015	Best Ballad Award	"Snow of April"	Nominated	
Melon Music Awards	2023	Top 10 Artists (Bonsang)	Huh Gak	Nominated	
Mnet Asian Music Awards	2011	Best New Male Artist	Huh Gak	Won	
Mnet Asian Music Awards	2011	Best Vocal Performance – Solo	"Hello"	Nominated	
Mnet Asian Music Awards	2011	Best OST	"Please Don't Forget Me"	Nominated	
Mnet Asian Music Awards	2012	Best Vocal Performance – Solo	"The Person Who Once Loved Me"	Nominated	
Mnet Asian Music Awards	2012	Best OST	"One Person"	Nominated	
Mnet Asian Music Awards	2012	Best Collaboration	"I Need You" (with Zia)	Nominated	
Mnet Asian Music Awards	2014	Best Collaboration	"Break Up to Make Up" (with Jung Eun-ji)	Nominated	
Mnet Asian Music Awards	2015	Best Vocal Performance – Male	"Snow of April"	Nominated	
Seoul Music Awards	2012	Main Prize (Bonsang)	Huh Gak	Won	
