= Victon =

South Korean boy group

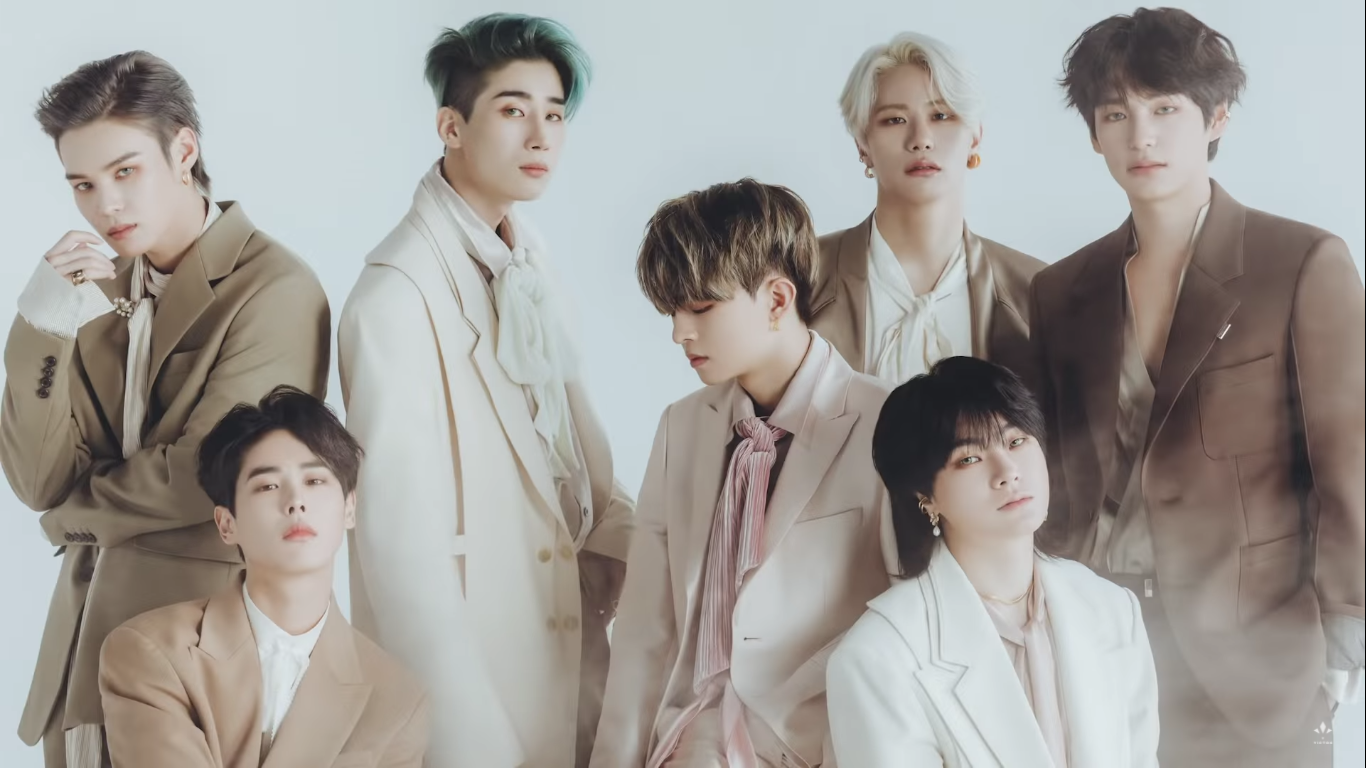
- Victon in January 2021; L to R (Back): Sejun, Seungwoo, Seungsik, Chan (former); L to R (Front): Byungchan, Subin, Hanse

Background information
- Origin: Seoul, South Korea
- Genres: K-pop; dance-pop; hip hop
- Years active: 2016–present
- Label: IST
- Members: Seungwoo; Seungsik; Sejun; Hanse; Byungchan; Subin
- Past members: Chan
- Website: play-m.co.kr/victon

Victon (Korean: 빅톤; stylized as VICTON, an acronym for Voice to New World) is a South Korean boy group formed in 2016 by IST Entertainment (formerly A Cube Entertainment, Plan A Entertainment, and Play M Entertainment). The group is composed of six members: Seungwoo, Seungsik, Sejun, Hanse, Byungchan and Subin. Originally a septet, Chan left the group in 2022. They debuted on November 9, 2016, with their extended play Voice to New World.

== History ==
=== Pre-debut ===
Members Chan, Seungwoo, Seungsik and Byungchan joined A Cube Entertainment in 2014 and were among the company's first batch of male trainees. Hanse and Sejun joined a year later, followed by last-minute addition, former Cube Entertainment trainee Subin. Several of the members had experience working with their label-mates whilst still trainees, having been back-up dancers for Apink at their 2015 "Pink Island" concerts and recorded backing vocals for Huh Gak's album.

=== 2016: Me & 7 Men and debut ===
In August 2016, Plan A Entertainment (formerly A Cube Entertainment) released details regarding the new group they planned to debut, referred to as "Plan A Boys", and their upcoming reality show that would chronicle the group's preparation for debut, titled Me & 7 Men, with the first episode airing August 30 on Mnet.

On September 1, Seungsik, Sejun and Hanse released a digital single as Plan A Boys in collaboration with Huh Gak titled "#Begin Again", accompanied by a music video starring Huh Gak and all seven members of the group.

Following the finale of Me & 7 Men, the group's official debut was set for November 9. For their debut, Plan A held a debut showcase for the group on November 9, announcing their group name Victon, an acronym for "Voice to a New World", with their debut EP Voice to New World with the dual title tracks "I'm Fine" and "What Time Is It Now?" being released the same day.

=== 2017: Further EP releases ===
On March 2, 2017, Victon released their second EP, Ready, with the lead single titled "Eyez Eyez". Despite being relative rookies, the members were personally involved in the production process, with Hanse writing all his rap parts and Chan and Seungwoo co-creating the choreography for "Eyez Eyez" and the other promoted song "Blank" (얼타). "Eyez Eyez" is primarily in the futuresynth genre, with the group's second EP intended to show a different musical side to the group than their debut release. Critics also noted from its music video and more sophisticated choreography that the group had adopted a more mature and charismatic image.

Victon's third EP, Identity, was released on August 23, with a total of five tracks including the lead single "Unbelievable". They also held a comeback showcase at the Samsung Hall at Ewha Womans University on the same day as the album's release.

Their fourth EP, From. Victon, was released on their one year anniversary on November 9. The EP contains six tracks including the title track "Remember Me".

=== 2018: Busking project and Time of Sorrow ===
On February 18, 2018, Plan A Entertainment announced that Victon would have a three-week busking project in various locations throughout Seoul and Gyeonggi Province. They performed songs from their previous albums as well as unreleased songs such as "On My Way", performed by Hanse and Seungsik.

On May 23, Victon released their first single album Time of Sorrow. The song topped the Tower Records chart in Japan, despite the group not having made their official debut in the country and only performed at KCON Japan.

=== 2019: Produce X 101 participation, comeback with 6 members ===
In early 2019, Seungwoo and Byungchan participated as contestants in Produce X 101. On July 11, it was announced by Play M Entertainment (formerly Plan A) that Byungchan would be leaving the show permanently to recover from the increasing pain from his chronic Achilles tendinitis. On the final episode on July 19, Seungwoo came third in the vote rankings and became a member of new boy group X1, originally on a contract for five years.

Victon made their comeback as a six-member group on November 4 with their fifth mini album Nostalgia and lead single "Nostalgic Night". The release attracted much more attention and the group became a top 3 trending search topic on domestic online music sites. "Nostalgic Night" earned the group their first music show win since their debut. After completing domestic promotions, they embarked on an Asian concert tour, playing at venues in Thailand, Philippines, Japan and Taiwan before concluding it with two sold-out encore concerts at the Olympic Hall in Seoul, the first time they have held their own full concert.

=== 2020: Continued releases and solo work ===
Play M announced on January 29 that following a solo fanmeeting in February, Seungwoo would return to promote with Victon and the group would make a comeback in March, following X1's disbandment earlier that month. On March 9, Victon released their sixth mini album Continuous and its lead single "Howling". Their lead single, “Howling”, achieved first place on The Show, on March 17, and was the group's first win with all seven members. It was announced later by Play M that member Byungchan would sit out of group promotions due to a herniated disk in his neck. From April 14 Seungwoo and Seungsik co-hosted the radio show Blanket Kick (이불킥), which airs on Naver's streaming app Naver NOW. on Tuesday nights; Chan eventually replaced Seungwoo as co-host on July 20, 2021, due to the latter's impending enlistment.

On June 2, the group returned with their second single album Mayday. They won first place on The Show on June 9 for "Mayday", marking the group's third win.

In August, Seungwoo made his solo debut with the EP Fame and lead single "Sacrifice", making him the first member of Victon with an official solo debut.

In October, Hanse confirmed he was working on a solo mixtape release, although without a set release date.

On November 4, it was announced that Victon would be releasing their first full studio album Voice: The Future Is Now on December 1 with the lead single "What I Said". Subsequently, it was announced that the release of their new album would be delayed after the members had come into contact with an external staff member who had tested positive for COVID-19. Although all members tested negative, they decided to complete the quarantine period.

=== 2021: Voice: The Future is Now and Seungwoo's enlistment ===
Following the delay, the album was released on January 11, 2021. The group held a comeback show that same day and it was aired on Mnet and its digital channel M2. The album includes four solo songs, one each for Seungsik, Chan, Sejun and Hanse, respectively.

Following the release of their first studio album, the members worked on solo projects in 2021. In March, Hanse and Chan participated in Seoul Fashion Week as models for the collection "SETSETSET", marking their second consecutive appearance as models at Seoul Fashion Week. Seungwoo released his second EP Fade and lead single "See You Again" on June 28. He enlisted for his mandatory military service as a member of the military band on July 28. Then, in August, Seungsik released the single "Look for the Silver Lining" in collaboration with the music company Clef, as part of a donation project for the charity Good Neighbors. Then, Hanse made his solo debut on September 25 with the digital album Blaze with the double title tracks "Take Over" and "Public Enemy".

In October, Seungsik, Hanse, Sejun, and Chan participated in a charity project with the charity Good Neighbors for the International Day for the Eradication of Poverty.

On November 9, Victon released the single "Sweet Travel" to commemorate their fifth anniversary. On November 26, Chan tested positive for COVID-19.

=== 2022: Chronograph, Chaos and Chan's departure ===
On January 18, Victon returned with their third single album Chronograph. The album included the lead single of the same name and its English version, which is their first song in English. The music video for "Chronograph" reached 10 million views within three days, the fastest of the group's music videos to reach that mark. The album was also noted for offering a more "environmentally conscious" version of buying the album, where those who purchased the album could order a version that just had the normal inclusions of a physical album, such as photocards, but then also receive a digital version of the album.

In March, the group released an original soundtrack for the drama Business Proposal titled "You are Mine", with Seungsik, Sejun, and Byungchan participating.

On May 31, Victon released their seventh mini album Chaos and its lead single "Stupid O'clock".

On October 11, IST Entertainment announced that Chan would be leaving the group following his DUI charge, and the group will remain with 6 members.

In October, the group announced their eighth EP Choice, was released November 15.

=== 2023–2024: Military service and contract ends ===
On January 27, Seungwoo became the first member to be discharged from the military. Seungsik enlisted in the military on March 20, and after basic training joined the Army Personnel Command's Army Military Music Equipment Battalion. On March 31, IST Entertainment announced that Sejun would enter the training center on June 13 and undergo basic military training before serving as an active duty soldier.

On April 20, IST Entertainment announced that members Byungchan, Hanse, and Subin did not renew their contracts with the agency, while members Seungwoo, Seungsik, and Sejun had their exclusive contract periods partially changed due to their military service, so were still under contract with IST. The three remaining members left the label during 2024; Seungwoo's contract ended on November 27, and Seungsik and Sejun ended their contracts on December 17.

=== 2026: 10th Anniversary ===
For their 10th anniversary, the group will have a concert series, 10:Now, with stops in Seoul, Taipei, and Bangkok.

== Members ==
=== Current ===
- Seungwoo (Korean: 승우) – rapper, vocalist, dancer
- Seungsik (Korean: 승식) – leader, vocalist
- Sejun (Korean: 세준) – vocalist
- Hanse (Korean: 한세) – rapper, dancer
- Byungchan (Korean: 병찬) – vocalist
- Subin (Korean: 수빈) – vocalist, rapper

=== Former ===
- Chan (Korean: 찬) (2016–2022) – dancer, vocalist

== Discography ==
=== Studio albums ===
List of studio albums, with selected chart positions and sales
Title	Album details	Peak chart positions		Sales
Title	Album details	KOR	JPN	Sales
Voice: The Future Is Now	Released: January 11, 2021; Label: Play M Entertainment; Formats: CD, digital download	4	—	KOR: 114,245

=== Extended plays ===
List of extended plays, with selected chart positions and sales
Title	EP details	Peak chart positions		Sales
Title	EP details	KOR	JPN	Sales
Voice to New World	Released: November 9, 2016; Label: Plan A Entertainment; Formats: CD, digital download	11	—	KOR: 16,074
Ready	Released: March 2, 2017; Label: Plan A Entertainment; Formats: CD, digital download	6	—	KOR: 28,232
Identity	Released: August 23, 2017; Label: Plan A Entertainment; Formats: CD, digital download	6	50	KOR: 23,483; JPN: 1,096
From. Victon	Released: November 9, 2017; Label: Plan A Entertainment; Formats: CD, digital download; Track listing: 1. "Remember Me" (나를 기억해); 2. "Because of You" (사랑하기 때문에); 3. "Have a Good Night" (Stage ver.); 4. "Stay with Me" (뒤돌지마); 5. "Timeline"; 6. "Remember Me" (나를 기억해) (Acoustic ver.)	14	—	KOR: 16,364
Nostalgia	Released: November 4, 2019; Label: Play M Entertainment; Formats: CD, digital download	4	—	KOR: 74,602
Continuous	Released: March 9, 2020; Label: Play M Entertainment; Formats: CD, digital download	2	38	KOR: 95,709; JPN: 1,067
Chaos	Released: May 31, 2022; Label: IST Entertainment; Formats: CD, digital download; Track listing: 1. "Stupid O'clock"; 2. "Bonnie And Clyde"; 3. "Ink"; 4. "Stay"; 5. "In Love"; 6. "Dear. Young"	6	—	KOR: 112,800
Choice	Released: November 15, 2022; Label: IST Entertainment; Formats: CD, digital download; Track listing: 1. "Virus"; 2. "Boy Who Chases Time" (시간을 달리는 소년); 3. "Alive"; 4. "Better Place"; 5. "Feels Good"	4	—	KOR: 98,759
"—" denotes releases that did not chart or were not released in that region.

=== Single albums ===
List of single albums, with selected chart positions and sales
Title	Album details	Peak chart positions	Sales
Title	Album details	KOR	Sales
Time of Sorrow	Released: May 23, 2018; Label: Plan A Entertainment; Formats: CD, digital download; Track listing: 1. "Time of Sorrow" (오월애); 2. "Time of Sorrow (Inst.)" (오월애)	2	KOR: 22,588
Mayday	Released: June 2, 2020; Label: Play M Entertainment; Formats: CD, digital download	3	KOR: 95,850
Chronograph	Released: January 18, 2022; Label: IST Entertainment; Formats: CD, digital download; Track listing: 1. "Chronograph"; 2. "Want Me" (시강의 문); 3. "Chronograph" (English ver.)	8	KOR: 60,195

=== Singles ===
List of singles, year released, with selected chart positions and album name
Title	Year	Peak chart positions		Album
Title	Year	KOR	US World	Album
"I'm Fine" (아무렇지 않은 척)	2016	—	—	Voice to New World
"Eyez Eyez"	2017	—	—	Ready
"Unbelievable" (말도 안돼)	2017	—	—	Identity
"Remember Me" (나를 기억해)	2017	—	—	From. Victon
"Time of Sorrow" (오월애 / 俉月哀)	2018	—	—	Time of Sorrow
"Nostalgic Night" (그리운밤)	2019	155	—	Nostalgia
"Howling" (하울링)	2020	167	—	Continuous
"Mayday"	2020	139	23	Mayday
"What I Said"	2021	78	21	Voice: The Future Is Now
"Sweet Travel"	2021	— (Note: "Sweet Travel" did not enter the Gaon Digital Chart, but peaked at number 142 on the Gaon Download Chart.)	—	Non-album single
"Chronograph"	2022	— (Note: "Chronograph" did not enter the Gaon Digital Chart, but peaked at number 60 on the Gaon Download Chart.)	—	Chronograph
"Stupid O'clock"	2022	— (Note: "Stupid O'clock" did not enter the Gaon Digital Chart, but peaked at number 59 on the Gaon Download Chart.)	—	Chaos
"Virus"	2022	— (Note: "Virus" did not enter the Circle Digital Chart, but peaked at number 74 on the Circle Download Chart.)	—	Choice
"—" denotes releases that did not chart or were not released in that region.

=== Soundtrack appearances ===
List of soundtrack appearances, year released, with selected chart positions and album name
Title	Year	Peak chart positions	Album
Title	Year	KOR DL	Album
"Celebrate"	2018	—	Evergreen OST (Part 6)
"You Are Mine"	2022	57	Business Proposal OST (Part 2)

=== Collaborations ===
List of collaborations, year released, with selected chart positions and album name
Title	Year	Peak chart positions	Sales (Note: Sales figures for tracks are based on digital downloads, except noted.)	Album
Title	Year	KOR	Sales	Album
"#Begin Again" (#떨려) (with Huh Gak)	2016	—	KOR: 17,447	Plan A Second Episode
"Oasis" (with Huh Gak and Apink)	2016	100	KOR: 22,488	Plan A Third Episode
"—" denotes releases that did not chart or were not released in that region.

=== Music videos (Korean) ===
Year	Music video	Director
2016	"#Begin Again" (#떨려) (with Huh Gak)	MJJ Progress
2016	"I'm Fine" (아무렇지 않은 척)	Tiger Cave
2016	"What Time Is It Now?" (Performance Trailer)	Tiger Cave
2016	"Eyez Eyez"	Tiger Cave
2017	"Oasis"	Tiger Cave
2017	"Unbelievable" (말도 안돼)	Tiger Cave
2017	"Remember Me" (나를 기억해)	Tiger Cave
2018	"Time of Sorrow" (오월애 / 俉月哀)	Naive Creative Production
2019	"Nostalgic Night" (그리운밤)	Song Eun-hee (Pixel Zero)
2020	"Howling" (하울링)	Kim Ja-kyoung (Flexible Pictures)
2020	"Mayday" (메이데이)	Yoo Sung-kyun (Sunnyvisual)
2021	"What I Said"	Yoo Sung-kyun (Sunnyvisual)
2021	"Sweet Travel"	Novvkim
2022	"Chronograph"	Kim Wooje (ETUI Collective)
2022	"Stupid O'Clock"	woonghui(wwhh)
2022	"Virus"	Yu Jun Young (Studio Saccharin)

== Filmography ==
=== Reality shows ===
Year	Title	Network	Episodes	Note
2016	Me & 7 Men	Mnet	10	Pre-debut
2017	Tour Avatar Ep.11 & 12	Arirang TV	2	With Byungchan & Sejun
2017	Victon's Born Identity	1theK Originals	16	
2018	Victon's Prelude to the War	1theK Originals	8	
2019	Victon Trust Game (의리게임)	Dingo Music	6	Excluding Seungwoo
2020	I Log U Season 2	Idol Live	8	Excluding Seungwoo
2020	Idol Workshop (아이돌워크숍)	Idol Live		
2020	Idol's Cuisine	1theK Originals	3	
2020	Victon's Wise Life	Victon Vlive Channel	8	
2020	How to Be Inssa	1theK Originals	6	
2021	Victon's World Tour	Idol Live	8	
2021	Big Forest	Seezn/KTV	6	With Chan, Sejun and Subin

== List of concerts tours ==
=== Victon First Europe Tour 2018 ===
Date	City	Country	Venue
September 11, 2018	Moscow	Russia	Mockba Hall
September 13, 2018	London	United Kingdom	229 The Venue
September 15, 2018	Madrid	Spain	Gotham The Club
September 16, 2018	Milan	Italy	Magazzini Generali
September 18, 2018	Paris	France	Flow Paris
September 20, 2018	Vienna	Austria	Reigen Live
September 22, 2018	Essen	Germany	Turock
September 23, 2018	Istanbul	Turkey	Uniq Hall

=== Victon 1st Asia Tour ===
Date	City	Country	Venue
November 29, 2019	Tokyo	Japan	Fuchu Forest Art Theater
December 1, 2019	Osaka	Japan	WW Hall
December 8, 2019	Bangkok	Thailand	GMM Live House
December 14, 2019	Taipei	Taiwan	International Convention Center
December 21, 2019	Manila	Philippines	SM City North ESDA Skydome

=== List of joint concert tours ===
Event	Date	City	Country	Venue
15th Korea Times Music Festival	April 29, 2017	Los Angeles	United States	Hollywood Bowl
K-Content Expo Central Europe 2017	August 11, 2017	Warsaw	Poland	Hala Torwar
KCON Australia 2017	September 22, 2017	Sydney	Australia	Qudos Bank Arena
KCON Japan 2018	April 13, 2018	Chiba	Japan	Makuhari Messe
HallyuPop Fest 2018	September 7, 2018	Singapore		Singapore Indoor Stadium
2022 Dream Concert	June 28, 2022	Seoul	South Korea	Olympic Stadium
Jeddah KPOP Festival 2022	July 1, 2022	Jeddah	Saudi Arabia	Jeddah Super Dome

== Awards and nominations ==
Name of the award ceremony, year presented, award category, nominee of the award and the result of the nomination
Award ceremony	Year	Category	Nominee / work	Result	Ref.
Asia Artist Awards	2018	Popularity Award – Music	Victon	Nominated	
Asia Artist Awards	2019	Popularity Award – Music	Victon	Nominated	
Asia Artist Awards	2019	Star15 Popularity Award	Victon	Nominated	
Asia Artist Awards	2020	Popularity Award – Music	Victon	Nominated	
Asia Artist Awards	2021	Male Idol Group Popularity Award	Victon	Nominated	
Brand Customer Loyalty Awards	2021	Hot Trend Male Idol Group	Victon	Won	
Genie Music Awards	2020	Artist of the Year	Victon	Nominated	
MAXIM K-Model Awards	2017	Model-trainer Award	Victon	Won	
MTV Europe Music Awards	2020	Best Korean Act	Victon	Nominated	
Seoul Music Awards	2021	Bonsang Award	Victon	Nominated	
Seoul Music Awards	2021	K-Wave Popularity Award	Victon	Nominated	
Seoul Music Awards	2021	Popularity Award	Victon	Nominated	
Seoul Music Awards	2022	U+Idol Live Best Artist Award	Victon	Nominated	
Soribada Best K-Music Awards	2020	Bonsang Award	Victon	Won	
Soribada Best K-Music Awards	2020	Male Popularity Award	Victon	Nominated	
