= Han Seung-woo =

South Korean singer (born 1994)

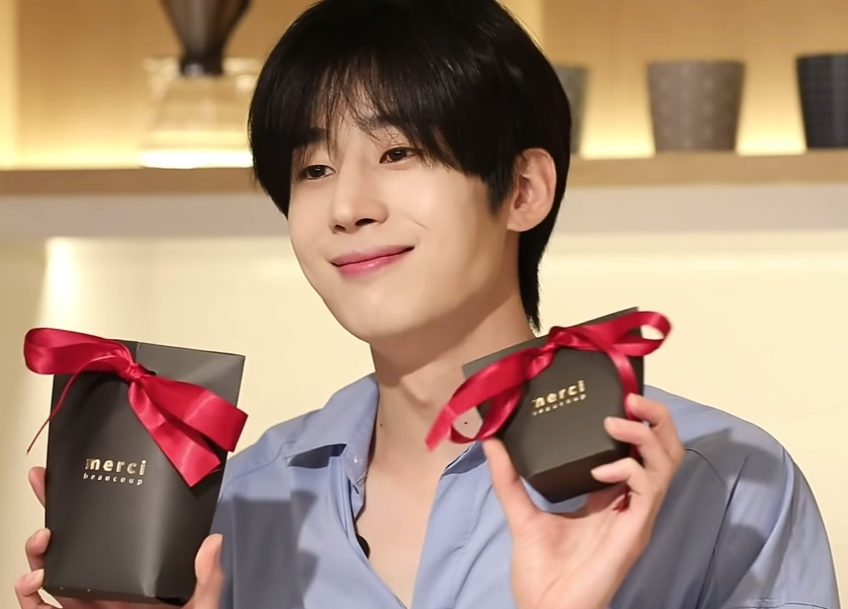
- Han in February 2022
- Born: December 24, 1994 (age 31); Busan, South Korea
- Occupations: Singer-songwriter; actor
- Relatives: Han Sun-hwa (sister)
- Musical career
- Genres: K-pop; R&B; dance-pop; ballad
- Instrument: Vocals
- Years active: 2016–present
- Label: Aura Entertainment
- Member of: Victon
- Formerly of: X1

Korean name
- Hangul: 한승우
- RR: Han Seungu
- MR: Han Sŭngu

Han Seung-woo (Korean: 한승우, born December 24, 1994), known mononymously as Seungwoo, is a South Korean singer, singer-songwriter, and actor. He debuted as a member of South Korean group Victon in 2016. In 2019, he finished third on Produce X 101 and became a member of X1. He debuted as a solo artist in August 2020 with the extended play Fame.

== Career ==
=== Early life ===
Han was born on December 24, 1994, in Busan, South Korea. He is the youngest of three children, with two older sisters, the eldest being the singer and actress Han Sun-hwa. In 2010 he appeared on television when he visited his sister in Invincible Youth. He never considered entering the entertainment industry and was an avid athlete throughout elementary and middle school, until an injury forced him to quit. Despite initial opposition from his father, he successfully auditioned with A Cube Entertainment (now IST Entertainment) and moved to Seoul in 2014 after completing high school. He and Victon members Heo Chan, Kang Seung-sik and Choi Byung-chan were among the company's earliest batch of male trainees.

=== 2016–2018: Debut with Victon ===
Han was announced as a member of Plan A's upcoming boy group, referred to as "Plan A Boys", and participated in their pre-debut reality show Me and 7 Men. In November 2016, Han debuted as the leader of the group, with the group announcing its official name, Victon. He participated in lyric writing for three of the songs on their first EP Voice to New World, including the lead single "What Time is it Now?".

=== 2019–present: Produce X 101, X1, and solo debut ===
In 2019, Han competed in Produce X 101 and finished in third place with 1,079,200 votes, subsequently debuting in the project group X1. The contract for X1 was originally for five years, but Han returned to promoting with Victon following X1's disbandment in January 2020 due to a vote manipulation controversy.

In February 2020, Han held a solo fan meeting and returned to promoting with Victon for their EP Continuous, released in March.

On August 10, 2020, Han made his solo debut with the EP Fame. "Sacrifice" is the EP's lead single, which Han wrote the lyrics for. The EP peaked at number two on the Gaon weekly album chart and sales surpassed 30,000 copies after the first day.

In September 2020, he competed in King of Mask Singer under the name "Blue Flag", making it to the second round of the competition.

In March 2021, Han was announced to be making his acting debut in the web drama Love #Hashtag. Before his enlistment, Han returned with his second EP Fade on June 28, with "See You Again" serving as the lead single.

On June 27, 2023, Han released his third extended play Frame. He won his first music show award as a soloist in SBS M's The Show with the album's lead single "Dive Into" on July 4.

On June 5, 2024, Han released his first single album Scene.

On November 27, 2024, IST Entertainment announced that Han's exclusive contract with the agency had ended. Later on December 13, 2024, Han signed a contract with Aura Entertainment.

On April 20, 2025, Han released his first digital single Positive Vibes . Later on June 30, 2025 Han released his fourth extended play Top Note.

== Personal life ==
In June 2021, Han announced that he would enlist for his mandatory military service the following month. He reported to Nonsan Army Training Center in South Chungcheong Province on July 28. He was discharged on January 27, 2023.

== Discography ==
=== Extended plays ===
List of extended plays, with selected details, chart positions and sales
| Title | EP details | Peak chart positions | Sales |
| Title | EP details | KOR | Sales |
|---|---|---|---|
| Fame | Released: August 10, 2020; Label: Play M Entertainment; Format: CD, digital download | 2 | KOR: 86,063 |
| Fade | Released: June 28, 2021; Label: Play M Entertainment; Format: CD, digital download | 5 | KOR: 70,978 |
| Frame | Released: June 27, 2023; Label: Play M Entertainment; Format: CD, digital download | 16 | KOR: 57,136 |
| Scene | Released: June 5, 2024; Label: IST Entertainment; Format: CD, digital download | 14 | KOR: 22,226 |
| Top Note | Released: June 30, 2025; Label: Aura Entertainment; Format: CD, digital download | 41 | KOR: 8,786 |

=== Singles ===
==== As lead artist ====
| Title | Year | Peak position | Album |
| Title | Year | KOR | Album |
|---|---|---|---|
| "Sacrifice" | 2020 | 97 | Fame |
| "See You Again" (다시 만나) | 2021 | 79 | Fade |
| "Dive Into" | 2023 | — (Note: "Dive Into" did not enter the Circle Digital Chart, but peaked at number 12 on the Circle Download Chart.) | Frame |
| "Blooming" | 2024 | — (Note: "Blooming" did not enter the Circle Digital Chart, but peaked at number 25 on the Circle Download Chart.) | Scene |
| "Positive Vibes" (행복회로) | 2025 | — (Note: "Positive Vibes" did not enter the Circle Digital Chart, but peaked at number 138 on the Circle Download Chart.) | Non-album single |
| "Stop It" | 2025 | — (Note: "Stop It" did not enter the Circle Digital Chart, but peaked at number 84 on the Circle Download Chart.) | Top Note |
"—" denotes releases that did not chart or were not released in that region.

=== Soundtrack appearances ===
| Title | Year | Peak position | Album |
| Title | Year | KOR | Album |
|---|---|---|---|
| "If We Can't See From Tomorrow" (내일부터 우리가 못본다면) | 2020 | 195 | Hyena OST Part 10 |
| "Please" | 2021 | — | The Witch's Diner OST Part 4 |
| "A Song For You" | 2023 | — | Soundtrack 2 OST Part 2 |
| "Start" | 2024 | — | Wedding Impossible OST Part 1 |
"—" denotes releases that did not chart or were not released in that region.

=== Songwriting credits ===
Han has 49 songwriting credits registered with the Korea Music Copyright Association (KOMCA). All credits are adapted from KOMCA, unless stated otherwise.

| Year | Song | Album | Artist | With | Notes |
|---|---|---|---|---|---|
| 2016 | "What Time Is It Now?" | Voice to New World | Victon | Victon, BeomxNang | Co-writer |
| 2016 | "The Chemistry" | Voice to New World | Victon | Do Han-se, Wiidope, Yoo Geun Ho | Co-writer |
| 2016 | "I'm Fine" | Voice to New World | Victon | Do Han-se, BeomxNang | Co-writer |
| 2017 | "Sunrise" | Ready | Victon | Maxx Song, Do Han-se, An Seong-chan, Brunell Brandes Gabriel Erik Henrik | Co-writer |
| 2017 | "So Bad.." | Ready | Victon | Do Han-se, S2 Evolution, Monster No. | Co-writer |
| 2017 | "Just Come" | Non-album single | Victon | Victon, BeomxNang | Co-writer, co-composer |
| 2017 | "Flower" | Identity | Victon | Bu Han-sol, Park Ju-seong, Do Han-se | Co-writer |
| 2017 | "Unbelievable" | Identity | Victon | Do Han-se, BeomxNang | Co-writer, co-composer |
| 2017 | "Light" | Identity | Victon | Kim Jwa-yeong, Do Han-se, Obros | Co-writer |
| 2017 | "Stay With Me" | From. Victon | Victon | Do Han-se | Co-writer |
| 2017 | "Have a Good Night" (Stage ver.) | From. Victon | Victon | Victon, Bu Han-sol, Park Ju-seong, Jang Hye-won, I Gil-beom | Co-writer |
| 2017 | "Timeline" | From. Victon | Victon | Do Han-se, Song Seung-geun | Co-writer |
| 2018 | "Time of Sorrow" | Time of Sorrow | Victon | HSND, Nano, Do Han-se | Co-writer |
| 2020 | "Petal" | Continuous | Victon | Kang Seung-sik, Do Han-se, Byun Mu-hyeok | Co-writer, co-composer |
| 2020 | "Nightmare" | Continuous | Victon | Jhun Ryan Sewon, Do Han-se, I Ji-won, JQ, Tan Tim | Co-writer |
| 2020 | "White Night" | Continuous | Victon | Im Se-jun, Do Han-se, Bymore, Kiggen | Co-writer |
| 2020 | "Mayday" | Mayday | Victon | Jhun Ryan Sewon, O Yu-won, Maeng Ji-na, Do Han-se, Borgen Jesper, Philippon Francois Henri, Rycroft Peter John Rees, Mann Tom, Teigen Sebastian Kornelius Gautier | Co-writer |
| 2020 | "Sacrifice" | Fame | Han Seung-woo | | Writer |
| 2020 | "Fever" | Fame | Han Seung-woo | JinbyJin | Co-writer, co-composer |
| 2020 | "Reply" | Fame | Han Seung-woo | Raudi | Writer, co-composer |
| 2020 | "I Just Want Love" | Fame | Han Seung-woo | | Writer |
| 2020 | "Forest" | Fame | Han Seung-woo | Primeboi | Writer, co-composer |
| 2020 | "Child" | Fame | Han Seung-woo | | Writer |
| 2021 | "Circle" | Voice: The Future Is Now | Victon | Jeong Jin-woo, Do Han-se, No Ju-hwan | Co-writer |
| 2021 | "Chess" | Voice: The Future Is Now | Victon | Sendo, Park Woo-hyeon, Jhun Ryan Sewon, Andrew Choi, Danke, Do Han-se | Co-writer |
| 2021 | "Flip a Coin" | Voice: The Future Is Now | Victon | Do Han-se, JINBYJIN, Ellen Berg, Moa "Cazzi Opeia" Carlebecker | Co-writer |
| 2021 | "All Day" | Voice: The Future Is Now | Victon | Do Han-se, Maxx Song | Co-writer, co-composer |
| 2021 | "Carry On" | Voice: The Future Is Now | Victon | Victon, Jhun Ryan Sewon, Hicklin Richard Ashley, Dominic Lyttle, Dylan Fraser | Co-writer |
| 2021 | "See You Again" | Fade | Han Seung-woo | Primeboi | Writer, co-composer |
| 2021 | "LL" | Fade | Han Seung-woo | Primeboi, Suran | Co-writer, co-composer |
| 2021 | "On and Off" | Fade | Han Seung-woo | Primeboi | Writer, co-composer |
| 2021 | "Fateful Love" | Fade | Han Seung-woo | RAUDI | Writer, co-composer |
| 2021 | "We Loved Each Other" | Fade | Han Seung-woo | Primeboi | Writer, co-composer |
| 2023 | "Intro" | Frame | Han Seung-woo | dr.ahn, YOUNGWOO, Maxx Song | Writer, co-composer |
| 2023 | "Dive Into" | Frame | Han Seung-woo | Cha Cha Malone, Maxx Song | Writer, co-composer |
| 2023 | "Runnin' High" | Frame | Han Seung-woo | RAUDI | Writer, co-composer |
| 2023 | "Burn" | Frame | Han Seung-woo | RAUDI | Writer, co-composer |
| 2023 | "Lovelorn" | Frame | Han Seung-woo | RAUDI | Writer, co-composer |
| 2023 | "Flutter" | Frame | Han Seung-woo | RAUDI | Writer, co-composer |
| 2023 | "Dawn" | Frame | Han Seung-woo | Chae Ji-ho | Writer, co-composer |
| 2024 | "Blooming" | Scene | Han Seung-woo | RAUDI | Writer, co-composer |
| 2024 | "Lost" | Scene | Han Seung-woo | RAUDI | Writer, co-composer |
| 2024 | "Stay" | Scene | Han Seung-woo | RAUDI | Writer, co-composer |
| 2025 | "Feel your love" | Top Note | Han Seung-woo | Kang Butter | Writer, co-composer |
| 2025 | "Stop It" | Top Note | Han Seung-woo | Kang Butter | Writer, co-composer |
| 2025 | "Falling too fast" | Top Note | Han Seung-woo | Kang Butter | Writer, co-composer |
| 2025 | "Chill guy" | Top Note | Han Seung-woo | Kang Butter | Writer, co-composer |
| 2025 | "Lonely" | Top Note | Han Seung-woo | Kang Butter | Writer, co-composer |
| 2025 | "Comma" | Top Note | Han Seung-woo | Kang Butter | Writer, co-composer |

== Filmography ==
=== Web series ===
| Year | Title | Role | Ref. |
|---|---|---|---|
| 2021 | Love #Hashtag | Lee Siwoo | |

=== Television shows ===
| Year | Title | Role | Notes | Ref. |
|---|---|---|---|---|
| 2019 | Produce X 101 | Contestant | | |
| 2020 | King of Mask Singer | Contestant | As "Blue Flag" (Episode 271–272) | |
| 2024–2025 | The Gentlemen's League 3 | Cast member | | |
| 2025 | The Gentlemen's League 4 | Cast member | | |
