= IST Entertainment =

South Korean entertainment company

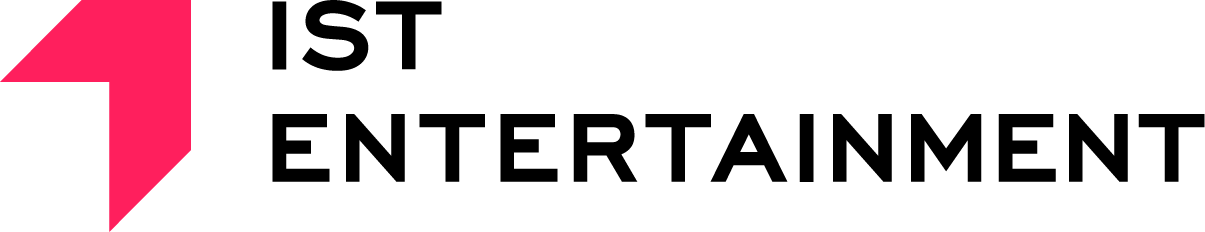
- Native name: 아이에스티엔터테인먼트
- Formerly: A Cube Entertainment (2011–2015); Plan A Entertainment (2015–2019); Play M Entertainment (2019–2021)
- Type: Subsidiary
- Industry: Music
- Founded: 2011
- Founder: Choi Jin-ho
- Headquarters: South Korea
- Key people: Jang Hyun-jin (CEO); Yoon Young-ro (CEO)
- Parent: Cube Entertainment (2011–2015); Kakao Entertainment (2015–2025); Beyond Music (2025); Content Technologies (since 2025)
- Subsidiaries: E&T Story Entertainment (2018–2021)
- Website: istent.co.kr

IST Entertainment (Korean: 아이에스티엔터테인먼트) is a South Korean entertainment company under Content Technologies.

== History ==
=== Plan A Entertainment ===
In 2011, A Cube Entertainment was established as an independent label of Cube Entertainment. A Cube signed its first solo artist Huh Gak and launched girl group Apink, which was made up from former Cube Entertainment trainees.

In November 2015, LOEN Entertainment (later Kakao M and then Kakao Entertainment) acquired 70% of the entire label and subsequently absorbed it as an independent subsidiary. The label announced in March 2016 that it has been renamed Plan A Entertainment since it was no longer affiliated with Cube Entertainment. It launched its first boy group Victon in November that year.

In early 2018, Plan A Entertainment acquired Kakao M's actor agency E&T Story Entertainment, owning 60% of the agency's shares. In the following months, Choi Jin-ho (founder and co-CEO) resigned and 30% of the remaining shares were sold for 3.51 billion won. As a result, it became a wholly owned subsidiary of Kakao M.

=== Fave Entertainment ===
Fave Entertainment was originally founded in 2012 as LOEN Tree, to manage LOEN Entertainment's recording artists. It was spun-off as a separate subsidiary label in 2016 and renamed Fave Entertainment. Artists who were transferred to Fave Entertainment included Fiestar, History, IU and Sunny Hill. Its trainees have notably featured in MIXNINE, Under Nineteen, and Produce 101. In October 2018, the label announced its upcoming girl group, temporarily known as "Fave Girls".

=== Cre.ker Entertainment ===
Cre.ker Entertainment is a record label founded by Kakao Entertainment (formerly LOEN Entertainment) in 2014, the label is home to artist groups Melody Day and The Boyz.

=== Merged agency named to IST Entertainment ===
On February 13, 2019, Kakao Entertainment released a statement that Plan A Entertainment and Fave Entertainment would be merging on April 1. Plan A Entertainment, being the surviving entity in the merger, was renamed Play M Entertainment and absorbed Fave Entertainment's assets and remaining artists, including trainees.

In May 2020, it was announced that "Fave Girls", who became "Play M Girls" following the merger, would be debuting in June as Weeekly. It is the company's first girl group since Apink.

On September 17, 2021, Kakao Entertainment announced that Play M Entertainment and Cre.ker Entertainment would be merging in the future.

On November 12, 2021, it was announced that the company's new corporate name would be IST Entertainment, which took in effect on November 1.

On February 7, 2022, IST Entertainment announced the debut of a new boy group in the second half of the year through a reality competition show, The Origin – A, B, Or What?. The show premiered on March 19, 2022. On the finale episode aired on May 7, 2022, it was announced that the final 7 will debut as ATBO, and will debut in July 27.

On April 11, 2022, IST Entertainment and Universal Music Japan announced the foundation of their joint venture label, "Universal Music IST".

=== Full acquisition by Beyond Music ===
In February 2025, Kakao Entertainment agreed to sell its 100% stake in IST Entertainment to music intellectual-property investment company Beyond Music. IST Entertainment was established in 2021 through the merger of Kakao Entertainment's Play M Entertainment and Cre.ker Entertainment, and had represented artists including Apink, The Boyz, Weekly and ATBO. Beyond Music planned to retain IST's music intellectual property while partnering with Contents Technologies for artist development and management. The transaction formed part of Kakao Entertainment's broader efforts to restructure and consolidate its subsidiary businesses.

Following the sale of IST Entertainment to Beyond Music in February 2025, all six members of Weeekly terminated their exclusive contracts with the agency by mutual agreement. IST Entertainment did not announce whether Weeekly would disband or continue under a new agency.

In September 2025, music intellectual-property company Content Technologies began seeking approximately ₩80 billion in new investment at a proposed valuation of ₩300 billion. The funding was intended to support expansion of its music IP portfolio and overseas operations. Existing investors including KB Investment and SV Investment were reported to be considering follow-on investments, alongside potential new domestic and international investors.

In January 2026, IST Entertainment was reported to be preparing to debut Tunexx, a seven-member boy group scheduled to launch in March. The group includes Park Dong-gyu, who gained recognition through Boys II Planet. Tunexx was described as the first new group launched by IST Entertainment under its new management following the company's restructuring.

== Artists ==
Groups

- Tunexx (2026–present)

Notable trainees

- Huening Bahiyyih (Kep1er)

== Former artists ==
=== IST Entertainment ===
- Apink
  - Park Cho-rong (2011–2023)
  - Yoon Bo-mi (2011–2023)
  - Kim Nam-joo (2011–2023)
  - Oh Ha-young (2011–2023)
  - Jung Eun-ji (2011–2025)
- Victon (2016–2024)
  - Heo Chan (2016–2022)
  - Do Han-se (2016–2023)
  - Choi Byung-chan (2016–2023)
  - Jung Su-bin (2016–2023)
  - Han Seung-woo (2016–2024)
  - Kang Seung-sik (2016–2024)
  - Lim Se-jun (2016–2024)
- Bandage (2020–2023)
  - Lim Hyeong-bin (2020–2022)
  - Lee Chan-sol (2020–2023)
  - Kang Kyoung-yoon (2020–2023)
  - Shin Hyun-bin (2020–2023)
- The Boyz (2017–2024)
  - Sangyeon (2017–2024)
  - Jacob (2017–2024)
  - Younghoon (2017–2024)
  - Hyunjae (2017–2024)
  - Juyeon (2017–2024)
  - Kevin (2017–2024)
  - New (2017–2024)
  - Q (2017–2024)
  - Ju Haknyeon (2017–2024)
  - Sunwoo (2017–2024)
  - Eric (2017–2024)
- Weeekly (2020–2025)
  - Shin Ji-yoon (2020–2022)
  - Lee Soo-jin (2020–2025)
  - Monday (2020–2025)
  - Park So-eun (2020–2025)
  - Lee Jae-hee (2020–2025)
  - Jihan (2020–2025)
  - Zoa (2020–2025)

=== Former label ===
A Cube Entertainment / Plan A Entertainment / Play M Entertainment

- Apink
  - Hong Yoo-kyung (2011–2013)
  - Son Na-eun (2011–2021)
- Lim Ji-min (2019–2021) (Note: Transferred to Bluedot entertainment and debuted as member of Just B)
- Huh Gak (2011–2021)

Cre.ker Entertainment

- Melody Day (2014–2018)
  - Yeo Eun (2014–2018)
  - Yoo Min (2014–2018)
  - Ye In (2014–2018)
  - Cha Hee (2014–2018)
- The Boyz
  - Hwall (2017–2019)

E&T Story Entertainment

- Park Han-deul
- Kim Ye-eun
- Go Na-hee
- Ahn Soo-min
- Shin Hyeon-Seung (2020–2021)
- Jung Soo-hyun
- Kim So-hyun (2017–2021)

LOEN Tree / Fave Entertainment

- KRun
- Park Ji-yoon (1997–1999)
- Gain (2011–2013)
- Mario (2011–2013)
- Sunny Hill (2011–2017)
- Fiestar (2012–2018)
  - Cheska (2012–2014)
  - Jei (2012–2018)
  - Linzy (2012–2018)
  - Hyemi (2012–2018)
  - Yezi (2012–2018)
  - Cao Lu (2012–2018)
- IU (2012–2018) (Note: Returned to Kakao M and then transferred to EDAM Entertainment in 2020.)
- History (2013–2017)
  - Song Kyung-il (2013–2019)
  - Na Do-Kyun (2013–2019)
  - Kim Shi-hyoung (2013–2019)
  - Kim Jae-ho (2013–2019)
  - Jang Yi-jeong (2013–2019)
- Shin Zisu (2015–2016)
- I.B.I (2016)
- JBJ (2017–2018)

== Discography ==
=== Projects ===
Title	Year	Artists	Peak Chart Positions	Sales (Download)	Albums
Love Day	2012	Jung Eun-ji, Yang Yo-seob	8	KOR: 1,604,167+	A Cube For Season #Green
A Year Ago	2013	Jung Eun-ji, Kim Nam-joo, Jang Hyun-seung	13	KOR: 300,616+	A Cube For Season #White
Short Hair	2013	Jung Eun-ji, Huh Gak	1	KOR: 1,207,766+	A Cube For Season #Blue
Break Up To Make Up	2014	Jung Eun-ji, Huh Gak	1	KOR: 803,627+	A Cube For Season #Sky Blue
Photograph	2015	Kim Nam-joo, Yook Sung-jae	29	KOR: 115,083+	A Cube For Season #Blue Season 2
Bada 'Ocean.wav'	2016	Jung Eun-ji, Huh Gak	5	KOR: 407,547+	Plan A First Episode
#Begin Again	2016	Huh Gak, Plan A Boys	—	KOR: 17,447+	Plan A Second Episode
Oasis	2017	Apink, Huh Gak, Victon	100	KOR: 22,488+	Plan A Third Episode
