= Do Han-se =

South Korean rapper (born 1997)

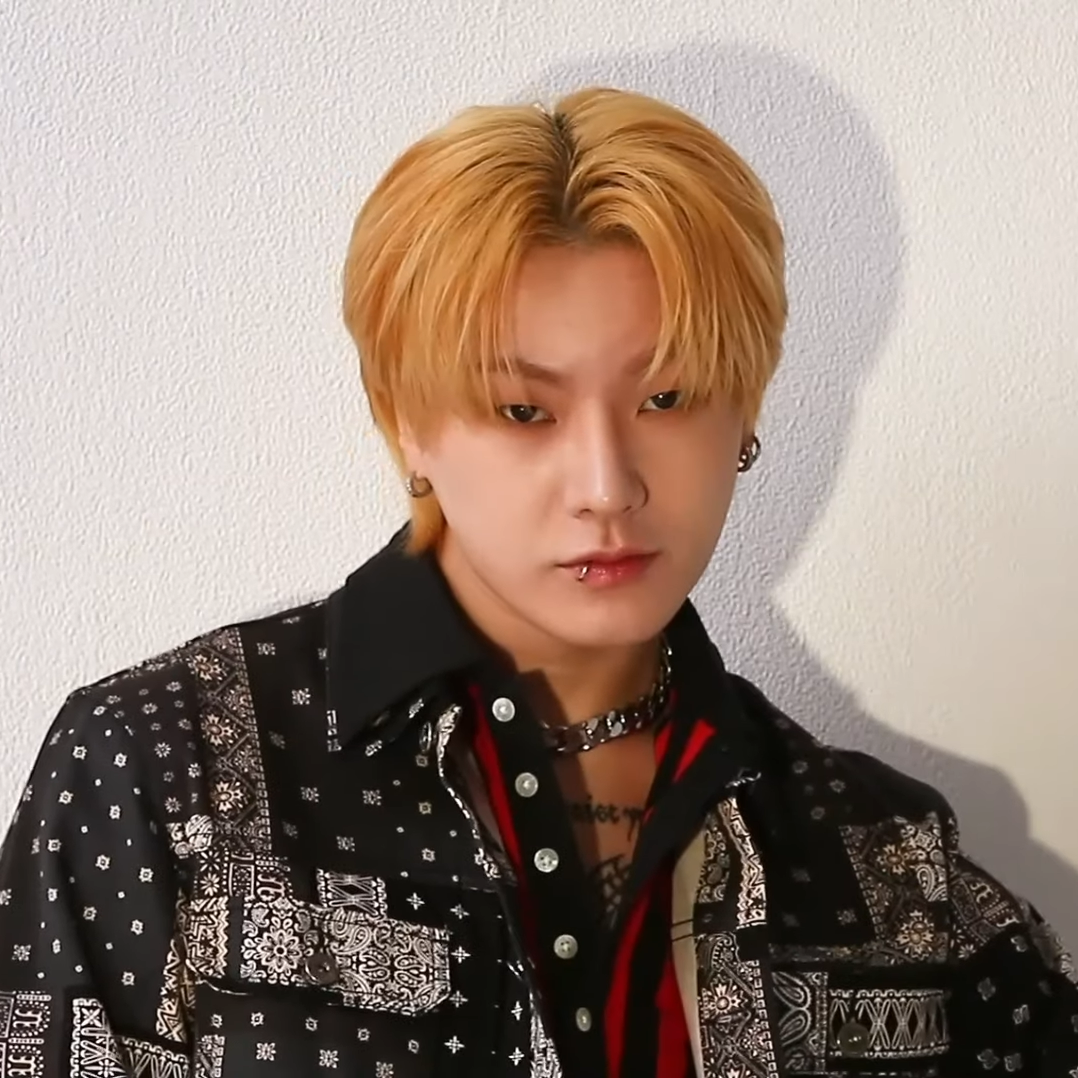
- Do in January 2021
- Born: September 25, 1997 (age 27); Incheon, South Korea
- Occupations: Rapper; singer; songwriter
- Musical career
- Genres: K-pop; hip-hop
- Instrument: Vocals
- Years active: 2016-present
- Labels: IST; The Dial Music
- Member of: Victon

Korean name
- Hangul: 도한세
- Hanja: 都韓勢
- RR: Do Hanse
- MR: To Hanse

Do Han-se (Korean: 도한세, born on September 25, 1997), formerly known mononymously as Hanse, is a South Korean rapper, singer and songwriter. He debuted as a member of South Korean group Victon in 2016. On September 25, 2022, he debuted with his solo album Blaze.

== Career ==
=== 2016–present: Debut with Victon ===
Do joined Plan A Entertainment as a trainee in 2016, and later that year was announced as a member of their new boy group, initially referred to as "Plan A Boys". He participated in their pre-debut show Me and 7 Men, before he debuted in Plan A's new group, officially named Victon in November 2016. Since the group's first EP, Do has songwriting credits on the majority of their songs.

=== 2020–present: Solo work ===
In January 2021, for Victon's first full-length album Voice: The Future is Now, Do released the solo song "Where is Love?" which was also self-composed.

In March, Do appeared alongside groupmate Heo Chan as a model for designer Jang Yoon-kyung's brand SETSETSET at the Fall and Winter Seoul Fashion Week, after both appearing as models in the Spring and Summer Seoul Fashion Week of 2020.

Originally confirmed in October 2020 as a solo mixtape release, Do released his first solo album, Blaze, on September 25 as a digital album, with the dual title tracks "Take Over" and "Public Enemy". Do participated in the production of all six tracks on the album. While the album was a digital release, a Kit version of the album was released on October 5, which sold 7,589 copies in its first month of release.

In October, Do, alongside group members Kang Seung-sik, Heo Chan, and Lim Se-jun, participated in a charity project with Good Neighbors for the International Day for the Eradication of Poverty.

In March 2022, Do featured in the song "Seventh Floor" from Korean indie artist Kim Mi-jeong's EP Volume Up!. He also participated in the co-wrote and produced the song. In June, he featured on Chu Seo-jun's song "Sippin'", from the album Now is Sober.

On April 20, 2023, IST Entertainment announced that Do did not renew his contract with the agency. On August 11, 2023, it was announced that he signed a contract with The Dial Music, which ended on July 22, 2024.

On July 9th, 2025, Do released his second EP, Neighbor Rockstar, in collaboration with the musician Laveen.

== Discography ==
=== Extended plays ===
List of EPs, with selected details, peak chart positions and sales
Title	Details	Peak chart positions	Sales
Title	Details	KOR	Sales
Blaze	Released: September 25, 2021; Label: Play M Entertainment; Formats: Digital download, streaming audio; Track listing: 1. "Take Over"; 2. "Diamonds" (with Skinny Brown); 3. "Slash" (feat. Bigone); 4. "Public Enemy" (feat. Jayci Yucca); 5. "Ride or Die"; 6. "Scent" (향기) (feat. Kid Wine, Yongyong)	23	KOR: 7,589
Neighbor Rockstar (with Laveen)	Released: July 9, 2025; Label: Quarter Music; Formats: Digital download, streaming audio; Track listing: 1. "Rocks in My Head"; 2. "Turn Upside Down"; 3. "Wake Me Up"; 4. "Slow Motion"; 5. "SMOKY"; 6. "Rainbow"	—	—

=== Single albums ===
List of single albums, with selected details, peak chart positions and sales
Title	Details	Peak chart positions	Sales
Title	Details	KOR	Sales
Gummy Bear	Released: October 23, 2023; Label: The Dial Music; Formats: Digital download, streaming	41	KOR: 2,150

=== Singles ===
==== As lead artist ====
List of singles as lead artist
Title	Year	Album
"Take Over"	2021	Blaze
"Gummy Bear"(feat. BIGONE)	2023	Gummy Bear
"How Time Files"(feat. BIGONE, Dive)	2024	How Time Files
"Blue Night"	2024	Bluessome
"Waterfall"	2024	Misery Loves Company
"Hello & Goodbye"	2024	Misery Loves Company
"Smoky"(with. Laveen)	2025	Neighbor Rockstar

==== As featured artist ====
List of singles as featured artist
Title	Artist	Year	Album
"BPM" (Note: "BPM" and "Erase" were released as promotional singles in collaboration with Foot Locker.)	MIC SMG (feat. Do Hanse, Yongyong and Goopy)	2021	Non-album singles
"Erase"	MIC SMG (feat. Do Hanse, Yongyong and Goopy)	2022	Non-album singles
"Seventh Floor"	Kim Mi-jeong (feat. Do Han-se)	2022	Volume Up!
"Sippin'"	Chu Seo-jun (feat. Do Han-se)	2022	Now Is Sober
"오늘밤도"	Taeb2 (feat. Do Han-se)	2023	오늘밤도

=== Songwriting ===
Do is credited on the majority of Victon's discography, and has been credited on 90 songs through KOMCA as of July 2025. For the group's single "Time of Sorrow", his lyrics were described as "poetic and refined", reflecting an "emotional side" of him.
