= Hugh Thomas =

Hugh Thomas may refer to:

- Hugh Thomas (actor) (born 1949), Welsh actor
- Hugh Thomas, Baron Thomas of Swynnerton (1931–2017), British historian and writer
- Hugh Thomas (equestrian) (born 1948), British ex-Olympian and Badminton Horse Trials director and course-designer
- Hugh Thomas (choral conductor), American choral conductor, pianist and educator
- Hugh Thomas (coach), Australian rules football coach
- Hugh Hamshaw Thomas (1885–1962), British paleobotanist
- Hugh Owen Thomas (1834–1891), Welsh surgeon
- Hugh Thomas (priest) (c. 1706–1780), Dean of Ely and Master of Christ's College, Cambridge

== See also ==
- Hugh Evan-Thomas (1862–1928), World War I admiral
- Huw Thomas (disambiguation)
