= David Oh (disambiguation) =

David Oh may refer to:

- David Oh, American politician from Philadelphia
- David Oh (golfer), American professional golfer
- David Oh (musician), Korean-American singer
- David Y. Oh (engineer), American systems engineer
- Zero, real name David Oh, a character in the Metal Gear series.
