= Indian Springs School =

Segregation academy in Alabama

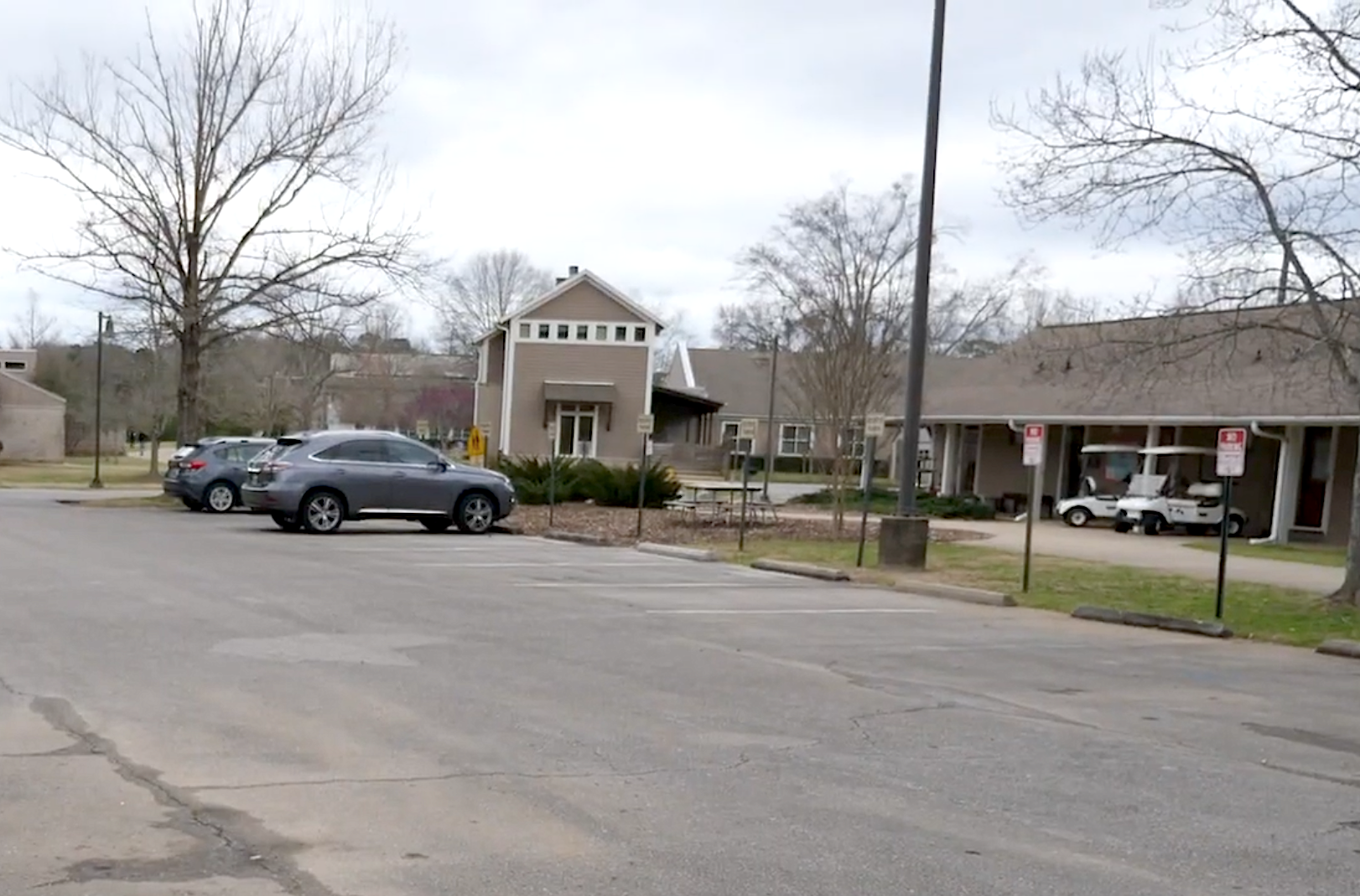

Location
- 190 Woodward Drive; Indian Springs, Alabama, Pelham, Alabama 35124; United States; 33°20′27″N 86°46′17″W

Information
- Type: Private, boarding and day, secondary school
- Motto: Discere Vivendo (Learning Through Living)
- Established: 1952 (74 years ago)
- CEEB code: 011440
- Head of school: Scott Schamberger
- Teaching staff: 38
- Grades: 8–12
- Gender: Coeducational
- Enrollment: 324 (2022-2023)
- Student to teacher ratio: 8:1
- Campus: 350 acres (140 ha) with an 11-acre (4.5 ha) lake
- Colors: Maroon and grey
- Athletics: Boys' and girls' cross country, basketball, bowling, tennis, golf, and soccer Boys' baseball Girls' volleyball and softball
- Nickname: Springs
- Accreditation: AdvancED, NCA CASI, NWAC, SACS CASI
- Newspaper: Woodward Post
- Yearbook: Khalas
- Website: www.indiansprings.org

Indian Springs School is a rural private school for grades eight through twelve for both boarding and day students, located near Birmingham in Indian Springs Village, in Shelby County, Alabama, United States.

== History ==
Indian Springs School was founded in 1952, endowed by Birmingham businessman Harvey G. Woodward, an alumnus of MIT. He died in 1930 and, in his will, bequeathed the funds and instructions for creating the school. Woodward stipulated that the school could admit only Christian, white boys, at a time when racial segregation was statewide in public facilities. He instructed that the school should use a holistic approach to learning (the school's motto is "Discere Vivendo", or "Learning through Living").

During its first years, the school was based on a working farm, where students carried out all the work needed, in addition to other studies. This element was soon eliminated. Indian Springs opened in 1952 with ten staff members and sixty students. The first director of the school was Louis "Doc" Armstrong. He made several changes to Woodward's original plans for the school. He developed a curriculum as a preparatory school and opened admissions to Jewish boys.

When the school was founded, most private and public facilities were segregated in Alabama. The restrictions on enrollment were sequentially abolished by 1976, both by actions of the first director and to comply with the Supreme Court ruling and later federal civil rights legislation in 1964.

== Campus ==
Indian Springs School's campus is on 350 acres (140 ha) in northern Shelby County, 15 miles (24 km) south of downtown Birmingham. Through the 1970s, the school was remote and surrounded by the woodlands of its campus, in addition to Oak Mountain State Park abutting its southern boundary. In the late 1970s, facing increasing debts and possible bankruptcy because of decreased enrollment, the school sold hundreds of acres surrounding the campus.

Instruction takes place in seven academic buildings, which house 23 classrooms, a science center, a concert hall, a theater, a student lounge, a college center, a technology lab, a 19,000-volume library, and special studios for chorus, art, photography, and drama. The athletic facilities include two gymnasiums, with two basketball courts, two volleyball courts, and two weight rooms. The campus has six tennis courts, a competition soccer field, a baseball field, a softball field, a cross country track, and a practice field/track. A new organic orchard, Fertile Minds, complements the greenhouse in producing food for the students. In 2006, new dorms for both boys and girls were opened.

For school year 2022–2023, the tuition per year is $27,300 for day students, $50,400 for Alabama resident boarding students, $56,500 for non-Alabama domestic boarding students, and $72,000 for international boarding students. There are annual bus and meal plan fees that are not included. Tuition fluctuates yearly.

== Sexual misconduct allegations ==
In 2019, after an internal investigation by a third party, Indian Springs released a report accusing former faculty members of sexual misconduct.

== Enrollment numbers ==
For the 2022–2023 school year:

- Total students: 324
- Day students: 242
- Boarding students: 82
- States represented: 9
- Countries represented: 11
- Faculty: 38
- Student-Teacher ratio: 8 to 1

The demographic breakdown of the 323 students enrolled in 2021-2022 was:

- White: 63.2%
- Asian: 24.5%
- Black: 4.4%
- Hispanic: 3.7%
- Multiracial: 2.5%

== Representation in media ==
- Young adult author John Green's debut novel, Looking for Alaska, is set at a school based on his attendance at Indian Springs School in 1995. A television series based on the book premiered in 2019.

== Notable people ==
=== Alumni ===
Notable alumni include:

- Daniel Alarcón, author
- Katrina Armstrong, dean of health sciences and former interim president of Columbia University
- John Badham, director
- Howard Cruse, cartoonist
- Hanelle Culpepper, filmmaker; the first woman and the first African American to direct the first (pilot) episode of any Star Trek series.
- Mark Gitenstein, American diplomat
- John Green, young-adult author and YouTuber
- Sarah Urist Green, creator and host of the PBS program The Art Assignment
- Ken Grimwood, author
- Preston Haskell, design-build construction executive in Jacksonville, Florida, and part-owner of the NFL Jacksonville Jaguars
- Perry Lentz, author and professor emeritus at Kenyon College
- Elaine Luria, member of the U.S. House of Representatives from Virginia's 2nd district
- Michael McCullers, film director and screenwriter
- David Y. Oh, lead flight director for Mars Curiosity rover and project systems engineer for NASA Psyche mission
- Tito Perdue, novelist and author of Lee
- Charles I. Plosser, president of the Federal Reserve Bank of Philadelphia
- Mona Singh, professor at Princeton University
- Clark Robert Smith, wine industry pioneer

=== Faculty ===
- Hugh Thomas, choral conductor
