= Bobak Ferdowsi =

NASA flight engineer (born 1979)

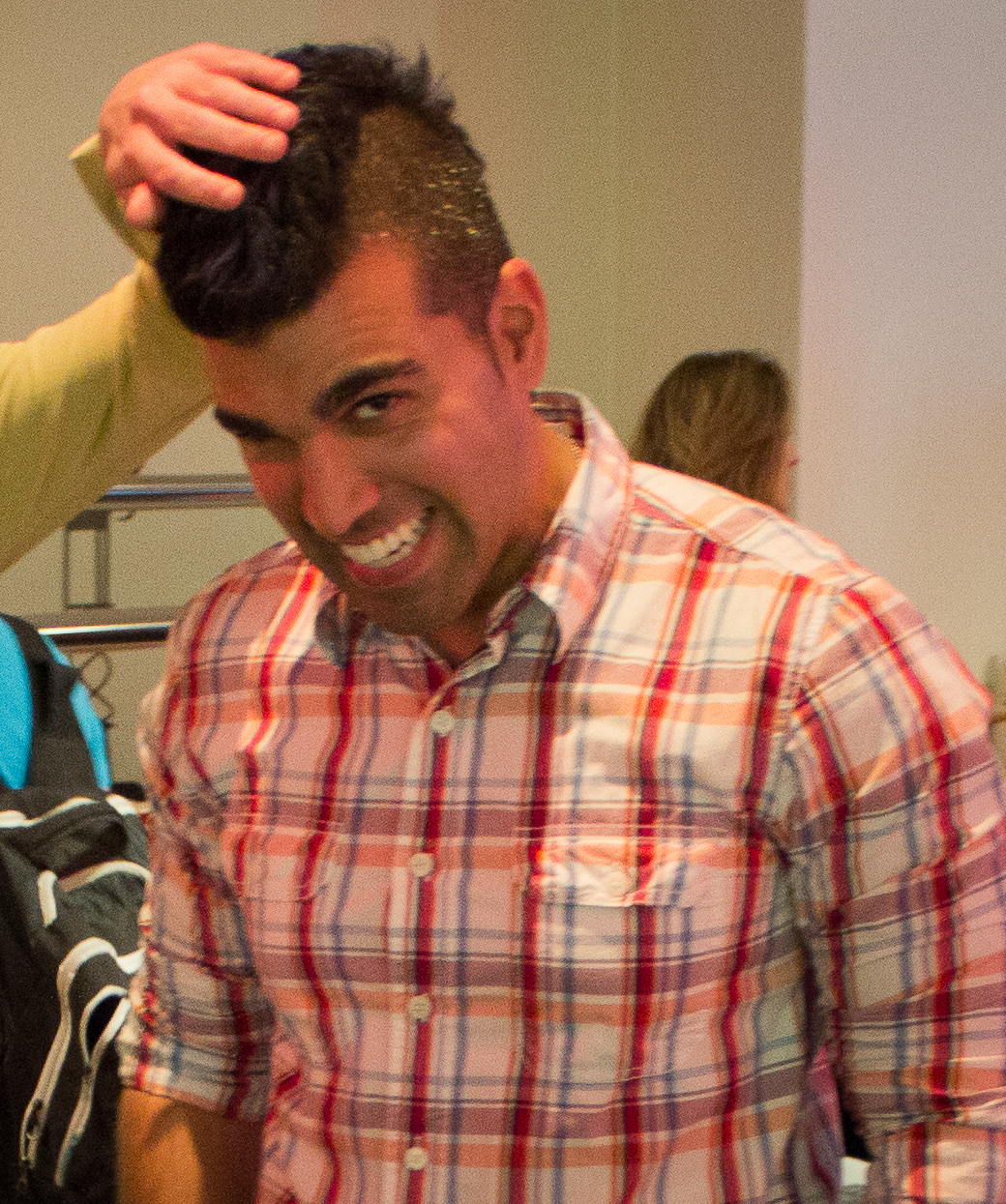
- Ferdowsi at SpaceUp Houston in November 2012
- Born: November 7, 1979 (age 46); Philadelphia, Pennsylvania, U.S.
- Education: American School in Japan; University of Washington (BSc); Massachusetts Institute of Technology (MSc)
- Engineering career
- Discipline: Flight engineer
- Employer: Jet Propulsion Laboratory
- Projects: Cassini–Huygens; Mars Science Laboratory

Bobak Ferdowsi (Persian: بابک فردوسی, pronounced [baːˈbæk feɾdoːˈsiː]; born November 7, 1979) is a flight engineer at NASA's Jet Propulsion Laboratory. He served on the Cassini–Huygens and Mars Science Laboratory Curiosity missions.

Ferdowsi gained brief media fame in August 2012 when, sporting a distinct mohawk hairstyle, he was repeatedly visible on camera during the televised Curiosity landing. His appearance became an iconic image of the event with coverage in the news and social media; even President of the United States Barack Obama commented on the popularity of "Mohawk Guy".

== Life and career ==
Ferdowsi was born November 7, 1979, in Philadelphia, Pennsylvania. He is of Persian descent; his father immigrated to the United States from Iran. His parents met in college. He was inspired to work in the space sector by his high school teachers and his love of science fiction, including Star Trek and the works of Arthur C. Clarke. Soon after birth he moved to the San Francisco Bay Area where he stayed until age 11, then moved to Tokyo in 1991, where he attended the American School in Japan, graduating in 1997.

The same year, he enrolled at the University of Washington where he majored in aerospace engineering, a childhood dream. While there he did research under Nobel Laureate Hans Georg Dehmelt in the Department of Physics. In 2001, he enrolled at MIT and joined the Lean Aerospace Initiative where he stayed until 2003.

Ferdowsi joined JPL in late 2003, and worked on the Mars Science Laboratory mission through its successful landing nearly nine years later on August 6, 2012. He was a science planner on the Cassini–Huygens mission, and is involved with the Europa Clipper as a systems engineer.

As of 2018, Ferdowsi is Fault Protection lead on the NISAR joint Earth observation mission at Jet Propulsion Laboratory.

== Media appearances and NASA advocacy ==
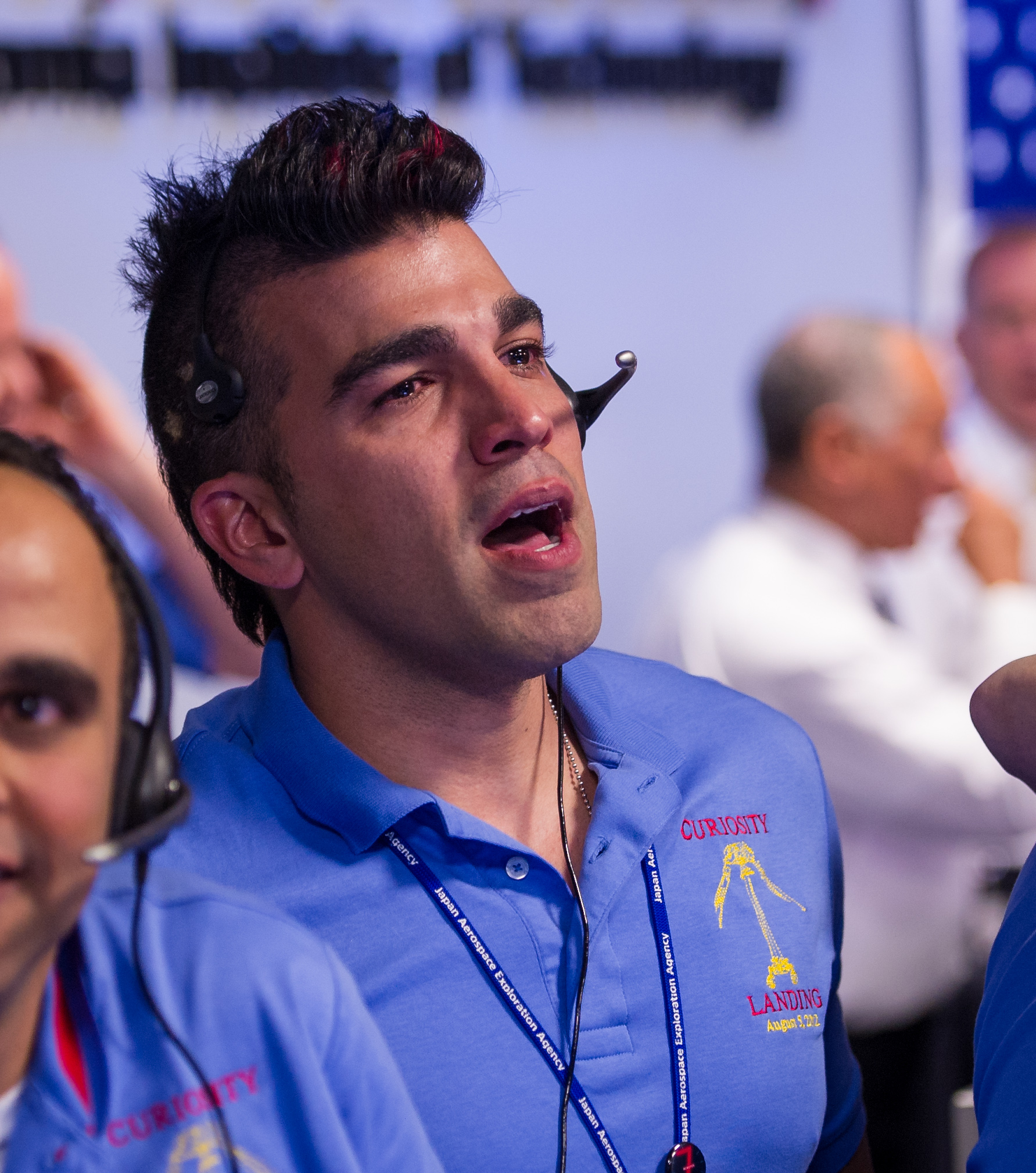
Ferdowsi observes Curiosity's successful landing on Mars.

Ferdowsi became a media sensation when, during the August 6, 2012, landing of the Curiosity rover on Mars, he wore a mohawk hairstyle that was seen on NASA TV's live broadcast of the event. He was seated in a prominent camera position and his mohawk unexpectedly became an iconic image of the landing. Ferdowsi explained that he wore a new haircut for every mission and the mohawk was chosen by his team by popular vote.

When President Barack Obama called to congratulate the team, he noted the popularity of the "Mohawk Guy", saying "it does seem NASA has come a long way from the white shirts, dark-rimmed glasses, and pocket protectors. You guys are a little cooler than you used to be." Ferdowsi said in another interview that he did it to help lighten the seriousness of the workplace and "If my mohawk gets a few more people excited about science and this mission, that's awesome."

Ferdowsi took part in the Second inauguration of Barack Obama in January 2013, marching in the parade alongside other NASA scientists and replicas of Curiosity and the Orion spacecraft, as part of the agency's official Presidential Inaugural Weekend. Ferdowsi also took part in Obama's State of the Union address on February 12, 2013, where he was seated in First Lady Michelle Obama's box "to highlight President Barack Obama's call for more visas for skilled immigrants in the fields of math, science and engineering."

Ferdowsi appeared on the sixth season of BattleBots as a sideline reporter. Ferdowsi appeared in a cameo role in the 2015 television film Sharknado 3: Oh Hell No! He is an advocate for the space sector and appears in several events that link arts and sciences. He is active on social media, using Twitter to make the public more aware of the lighter side of science. In 2024, Ferdowsi appeared as a fictional mission director in 3 Body Problem.

== See also ==
- Adam Steltzner, lead engineer of the Mars Science Laboratory Curiosity rover Entry, Descent and Landing phase
- Anita Sengupta
- David Y. Oh
