= San Diego Space Society =

The San Diego Space Society (SD Space) is a chapter of the National Space Society based in San Diego, California. It was founded in 2008. The group's goal is to raise awareness of the benefits of space exploration and San Diego's role in space development by promoting space education in local schools and events such as the San Diego Science Festival.

SD Space organized the first SpaceUp, an unconference about space, at the San Diego Air & Space Museum in 2010. The 2-day event was covered by Spacevidcast and attended by representatives from NASA, Google Lunar X Prize, Masten Space Systems, and Quicklaunch.

SD Space operates the Space Travelers Emporium, a combination of retail store, library, and clubhouse in South Park, San Diego. The Emporium plans to sell tickets for sub-orbital spaceflight through companies such as Virgin Galactic. To coincide with the 41st anniversary of the Apollo 11 launch, the Emporium screened Moon Beat, a documentary film by director Kevin Stirling told from the perspective of journalists who covered the U.S. Space Program at the time of the Moon landing.
