= SpaceUp =

SpaceUp is an open-attendance space exploration unconference, where participants decide the topics, schedule, and structure of the event. SpaceUps have been held on both West and East coasts, and in Houston. Common features of SpaceUps are an unconference/barcamp style schedule, Ignite talks, and a moonpie eating contest.

Topics from SpaceUp conferences include: discussion of newspace industry, how to get more people excited about space, and the future direction of NASA, ESA, CSA, JAXA.

== History ==
The first SpaceUp was held at the San Diego Air & Space Museum on February 27–28, 2010. It was sponsored and organized by the San Diego Space Society. The 2-day event was covered by Spacevidcast and attended by representatives from NASA, Google Lunar X Prize, Masten Space Systems, and Quicklaunch. This event was organized by Chris Radcliff.

The second SpaceUp event was held August 27–28, 2010 in Washington, D.C. at George Washington University. This event was organized by Evadot founder Michael Doornbos.

After several more successful events in the US, the SpaceUp concept crossed the Atlantic in September 2012, with the first SpaceUp unconference in Europe. It was organized by six dedicated space ambassadors at Europlanetarium Genk on 22 and 23 September 2012. SpaceUp Europe triggered several space enthusiasts to organize more European space unconferences, making the concept truly global. SpaceUp Stuttgart in Germany was held 27 October, followed by SpaceUp Poland in Warsaw on 24 and 25 November. SpaceUp London and Paris were held 2013. In December 2012 the concept rolled further East with the first event in Asia, SpaceUp India.

== Events ==
Date	Event	Location
February 27–28, 2010	SpaceUp San Diego	San Diego Air & Space Museum
August 27–28, 2010	SpaceUp DC	George Washington University
February 12–13, 2011	SpaceUp Houston	Lunar and Planetary Institute
February 12–13, 2011	SpaceUp San Diego	The Loft at UC San Diego
August 6–7, 2011	SpaceUp LA	Columbia Memorial Space Center
August 18–19, 2012	SpaceUp LA	University of Southern California
September 22–23, 2012	SpaceUp EU	Europlanetarium Genk
Oct 27, 2012	SpaceUp Stuttgart	Stuttgart, Germany
Nov 24–25, 2012	SpaceUp Poland	Warsaw, Poland
Dec 1, 2012	SpaceUp India	Bangalore, India
May 25–26, 2013	SpaceUp Paris	Paris, France, France
July 2013	SpaceUp Waterloo	Waterloo, Ontario, Canada
October 4–5, 2013	SpaceUp Denver	Denver, Colorado, United States of America
October 10, 2013	SpaceUp Barcelona	Barcelona, Catalonia, Spain
November 9–10, 2013	SpaceUp LA	Western Museum of Flight
December 6–7, 2013	SpaceUp India	MANIT, Bhopal, IISER Bhopal, India
September 20–21, 2014	SpaceUp Toulouse	Cité de l'espace, Toulouse, France, France
October 18, 2014	SpaceUp Sweden	Royal Institute of Technology, Stockholm, Sweden
May 5-6, 2018	SpaceUp Pisa	University of Pisa, Pisa, Italy
