= Genk =

Genk Gènk (Limburgish)
- City and municipality
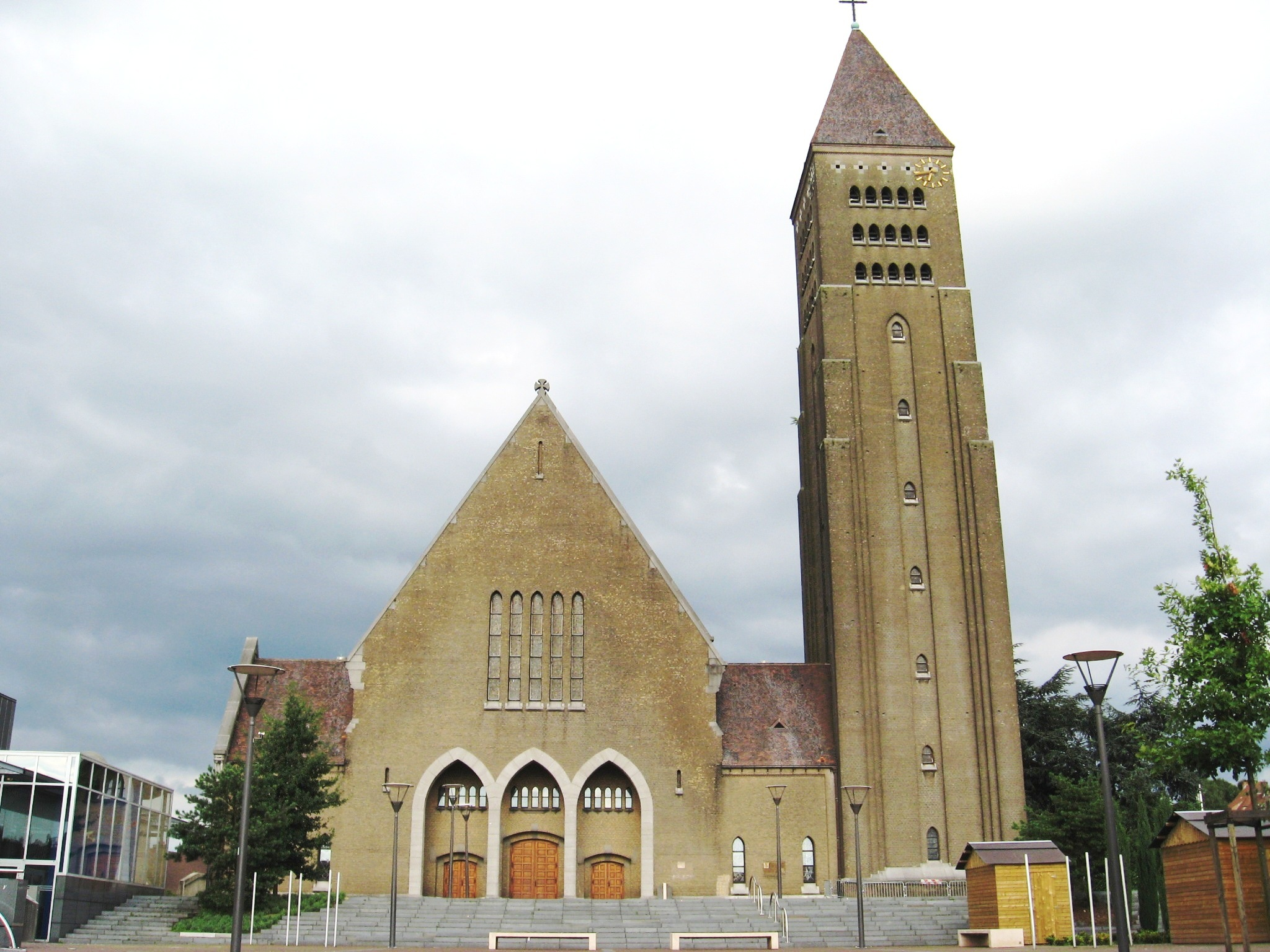
- Church of Saint Martin

- Flag Coat of arms

- Location of Genk in Limburg
- Interactive map of Genk
- Location in Belgium
- Coordinates: 50°58′N 05°30′E
- Country: Belgium
- Community: Flemish Community
- Region: Flemish Region
- Province: Limburg
- Arrondissement: Hasselt

Government
  - Mayor: Wim Dries (CD&V)
  - Governing parties: CD&V, Pro Genk

Area
  - Total: 87.57 km^{2} (33.81 sq mi)

Population (2018-01-01)
  - Total: 66,110
  - Density: 754.9/km^{2} (1,955/sq mi)
- Postal codes: 3600
- NIS code: 71016
- Area codes: 089
- Website: www.genk.be

Genk (Dutch pronunciation: [ɣɛŋk]) is a municipality and city located in the Belgian province of Limburg near Hasselt. The municipality comprises only the town of Genk itself. It is one of the most important industrial towns in Flanders, located on the Albert Canal, between Antwerp and Liège.

== History ==
=== Celtic and medieval origins ===
Genk probably originated as a Celtic village, and was converted to Christianity in the 10th century. The remains of a little wooden church dating from that period were found in the area. The first mention of Genk as Geneche can be found in a document dating from 1108, ceding the territory to the Abbey of Rolduc. Politically, Genk belonged to the County of Loon until it was annexed by the Prince-Bishopric of Liège in 1365.

=== 19th century ===
During a century of on-going industrialisation further south in Belgium, Limburg modernised only slowly: Genk remained unimportant and small, growing slowly to a population of 2,000 around 1900. The village was the home of landscape painters and writers such as Neel Doff and became an artist colony where over 400 landscape painters painted en plein air.

=== 20th century development ===
In 1901, André Dumont found a large quantity of coal in the nearby village of As. Soon after, the "Black Gold" was also found in Genk. After World War I, the village started to attract a large quantity of both Belgian and foreign immigrants, and quickly became the biggest town in Limburg after Hasselt, peaking to a population of 70,000. However, in 1966 the coal mine of Zwartberg closed down, and Genk had to develop new industries, mainly along the Albert Canal and highways. By the end of the 1980s, the two remaining coal mines at Winterslag and Waterschei were also closed.

In 2000, Genk officially became a city.

== Economy ==
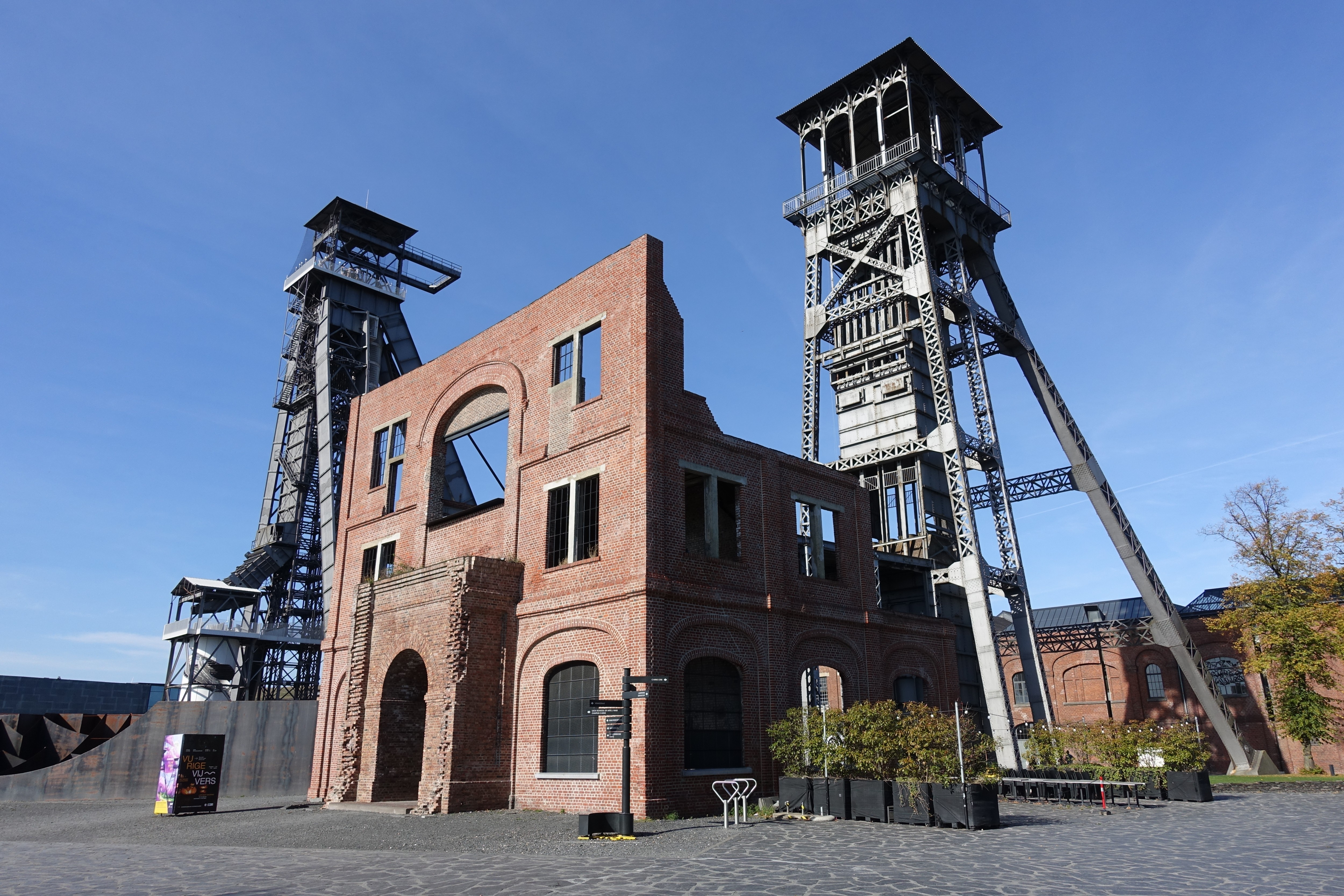
Headstock at the former Winterslag Colliery

Genk is the industrial centre of the province of Limburg and offers over 45,000 jobs, making it economically the third most significant city in Flanders.

In 1900, Genk was a quiet village with around 2,000 residents. At that time, Genk was known for its natural environment, popular among artists and painters who used Genk as a setting for their pieces. In 1901, coal was discovered in Genk and three mining sites were developed: Zwartberg, Waterschei and Winterslag (C-mine today). As a result, the population grew exponentially: today Genk has about 65,000 inhabitants with 107 different ethnic backgrounds. The mines had some good years, but in 1966 the Zwartberg mine closed, followed by Winterslag (C-mine today) in 1986 and Waterschei in 1987.

The Genk Body & Assembly factory of Ford Motor Company was the largest and most important employer in Genk until recently, employing some 5,000 people and building the Mondeo sedan and hatchback, the Galaxy (second generation, from 2006 and onwards) MPV/minivan, and the S-MAX sub-MPV. The factory closed in 2014.

=== C-Mine ===
The city went looking for new opportunities for the enormous mine sites on its territory, including the Winterslag site. In 2000, the idea began to grow to accommodate a creative hub in the buildings of the old coal mine of Winterslag. In 2001, the city of Genk bought the site from LRM (Limburgse Reconversie Maatschappij) and the name "C-mine" was born in 2005. As regards content, the creative hub works on four cornerstones: education, creative economy, creative recreation and artistic creation and presentation. With a university college specialised in various artistic graduation subjects, an incubator for young entrepreneurs, a cultural centre, a design centre, a cinema, C-mine expedition, etc. the C-mine mission has succeeded. It has created 330 jobs in 42 companies and organisations, including around 200 jobs in the creative sector in 33 creative companies.

Each day, C-mine produces: games, apps, websites, sets for television, drones, light shows, design items, stage productions, etc. C-mine is a site of creative makers in each of the four segments.

== Sights ==
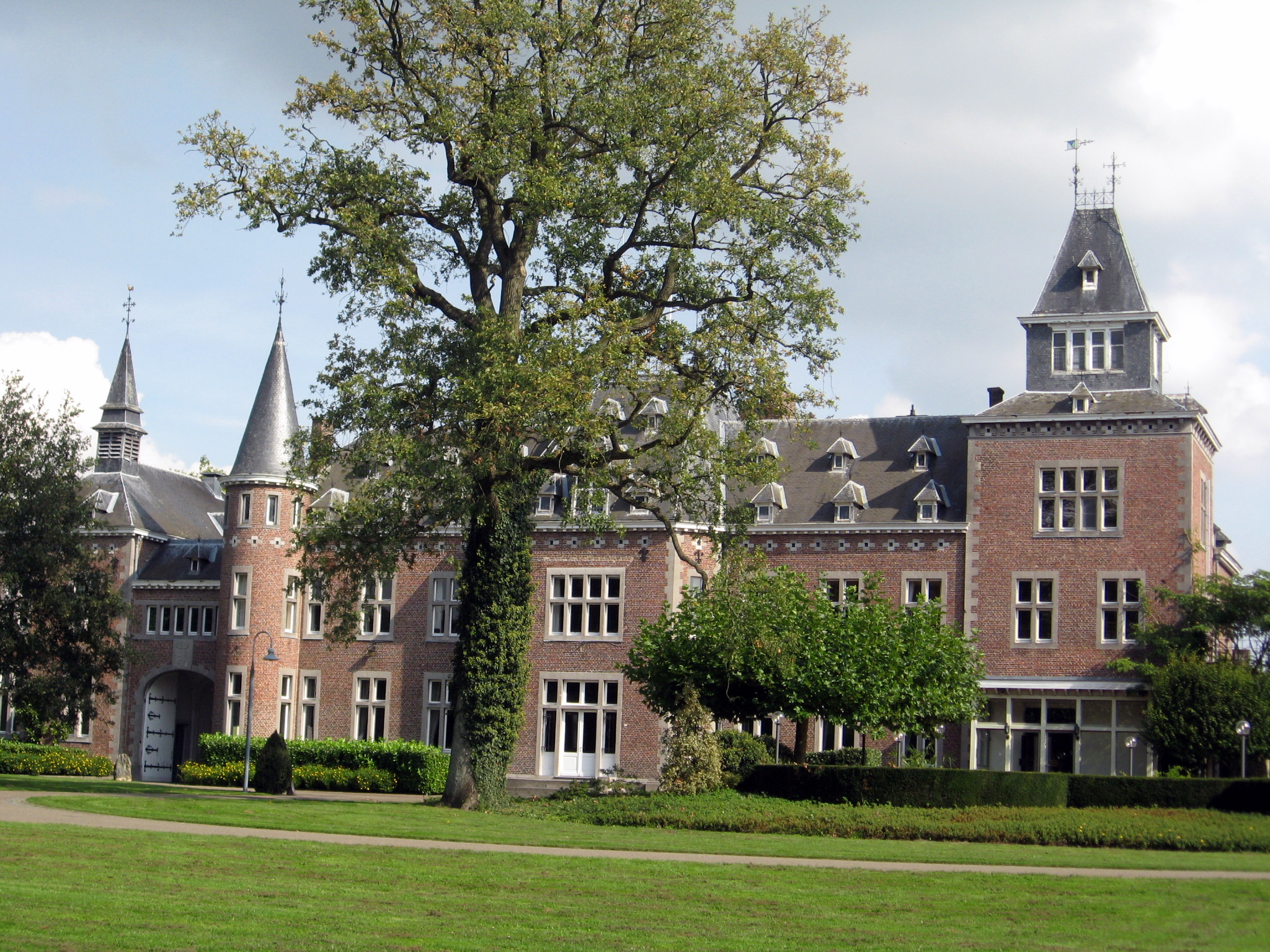
Chateau of the Bokrijk Estate

- The biggest tourist attraction of Genk is Bokrijk, an open-air museum consisting of authentic relocated buildings (mainly dating from 17th till 19th century) from all over Flanders. In the summer season, historical Flanders comes alive in Bokrijk through numerous actors and re-enactment events.
- Genk was established as one of the entrance "gateways" of the Hoge Kempen National Park, the first National Park in Flanders, at its opening in 2006.
- Also noteworthy are the old coalmines of Zwartberg, Waterschei and Winterslag, surrounded by slag heaps, huge black mountains of dug up soil and coal remnants. Some of the mine buildings and housing can be visited.
- Despite its industrial past and present, Genk is nicknamed 'De Groene Stad' (The Green City). It sports a nature reserve called "De Maten", the large recreational area Kattevennen (with the Europlaneterium), Bokrijk, and several other green areas. In sunny weather, you may also want to pay a visit to the Sundial Park (Dutch: Zonnewijzerpark). The history of the landscape painters who visited Genk between 1840 and 1940 can be discovered in the Museum Emile Van Doren.
- The Europlanetarium Genk has a planetarium and observatory.

== Events ==
- Genk was home of Motives Festival, an annual event taking place in November and celebrating "new sounds of jazz." Recent performers have included the fiery piano jazz of Esbjörn Svensson Trio, funky saxman Joshua Redman, and futuristic electronics wizard Leafcutter John. Another musical event, Genk on Stage, takes place during three days in the summer. This festival is celebrated no more.
- Genk is also rich in tradition, with a colourful carnival taking place around Ash Wednesday, the May celebrations featuring the May Queen, a flowers parade and a huge fireworks finale, and finally the Saint Martin procession, in honour of Saint Martin of Tours, one of the most popular saints in Flanders.
- In 2012 Genk was host to Manifesta, The roving European Biennial of Contemporary Art, together with events such as the biennial of Venice and the Documenta in Kassel, Manifesta is one of the foremost art events of Europe.

== Transportation ==
Besides the Albert Canal, Genk has rail service to Hasselt and a small airport (EBZW) 6 km (3.7 mi) northeast of the town center. De Lijn is the sole bus transport service provider within Genk.

== Sports ==
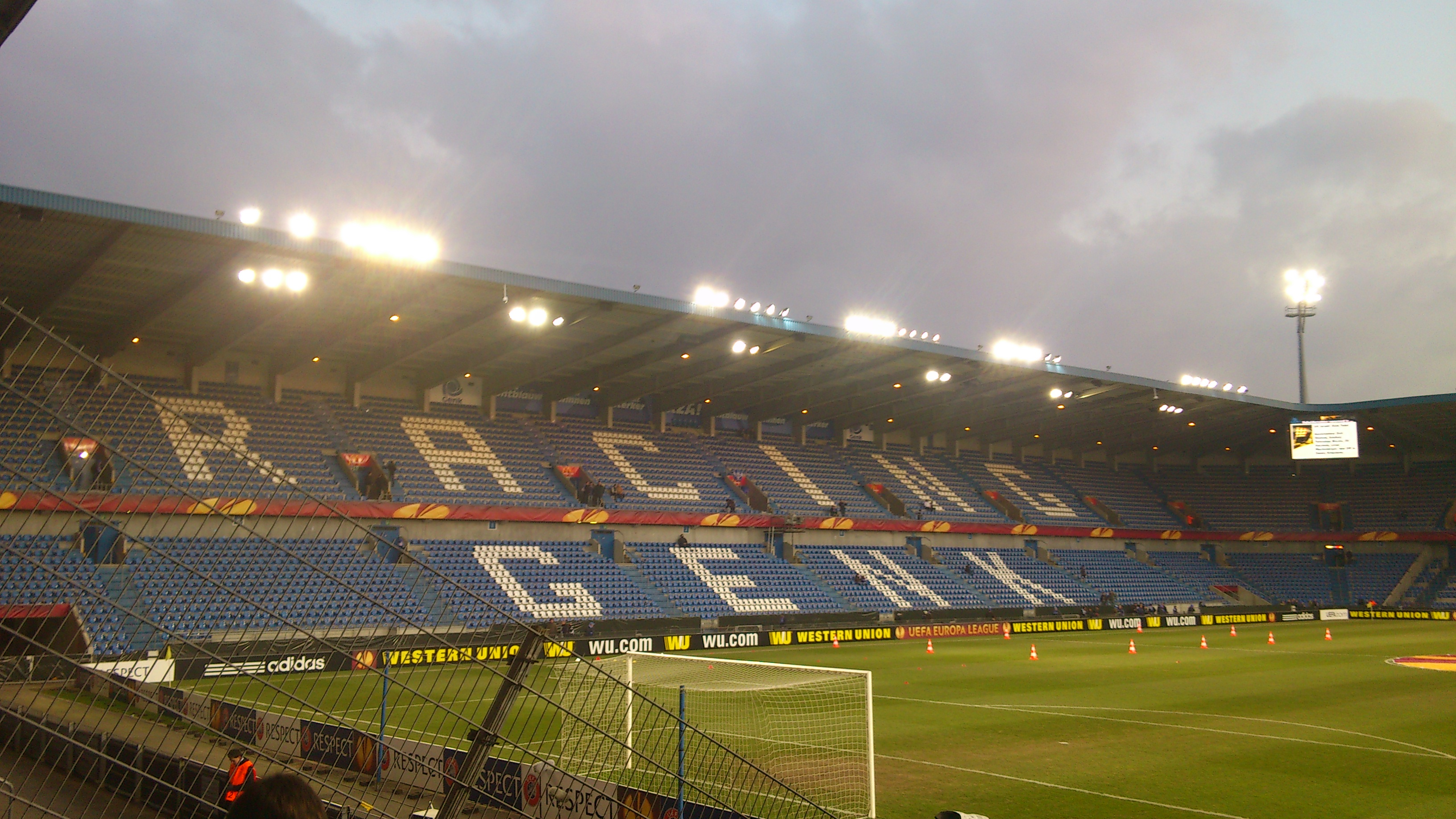
Luminus Arena

Genk's major football club, KRC Genk, promoted from the second division in 1996 and quickly became one of Belgium's top clubs. They finished first in the highest football league in 1999, 2002, 2011 and 2019 and won the Belgian Cup in 1998, 2000, 2009, 2013 and 2021. Because of this success, the Luminus Arena (formerly known as Fenix Stadium and Cristal Arena) of KRC Genk (place for 25 500 supporters) has become an important centre of both sport and non-sport activities in recent years. In the 2016–2017 season Genk reached the quarter-finals of the UEFA Europa League by defeating fellow Belgian side K.A.A. Gent over two legs, one of which was a 5–2 win.

Karting Genk is a kart racing CIK FIA track. In 2011 it hosted the Karting World Championship.

== Demography ==
24% of the inhabitants are of foreign origin from about 85 different nationalities, mostly Italians, Turks, and Greeks. It is believed that Genk has the largest Turkish community in Belgium relative to its population.

== Notable people ==
- Neel Doff, writer (1858–1942)
- Jacques Germeaux, former politician and former senator (b. 1956)
- Peter Vanhoutte, former politician and former Belgian MP (b. 1956)
- Martin Margiela, fashion designer (b. 1957)
- Jo Vandeurzen, politician and Minister of Health in the Flemish region (b. 1958)
- Dirk Medved, football defender (b. 1968)
- Ronny Gaspercic, football goalkeeper (b. 1969)
- Karel Geraerts, footballer (b. 1982)
- Benjamin De Ceulaer, footballer (b. 1983)
- Siglo XX, 1980's Coldwave band
- Claudio Desolati, Italian footballer (b. 1955)

== Twin cities ==
- Francistown, Botswana (since 2004)
- Cieszyn, Poland
- Isparta, Turkey
- San Giovanni in Fiore, Italy

== Gallery ==
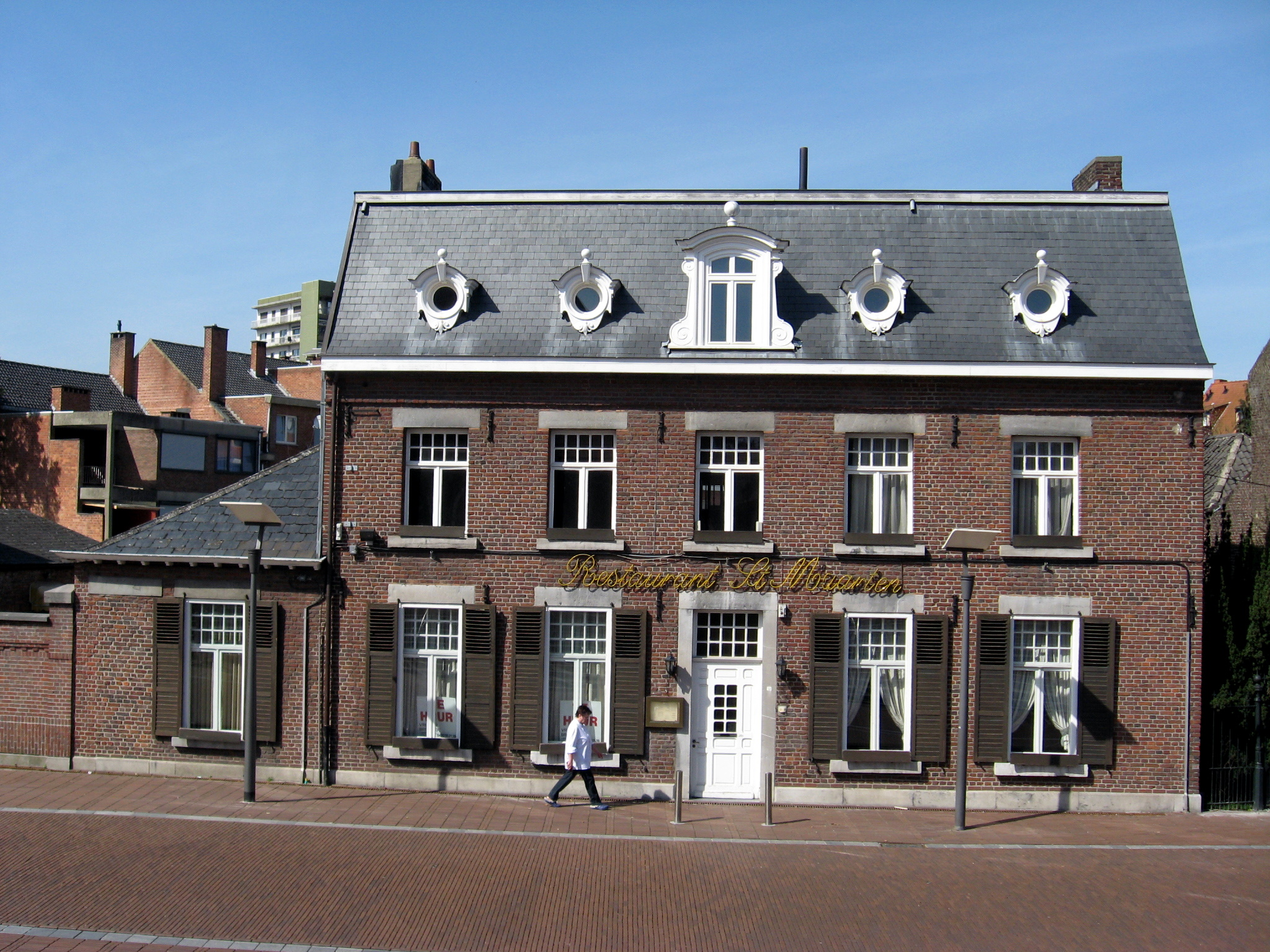
Built in 1844, Stationsstraat 13, Genk

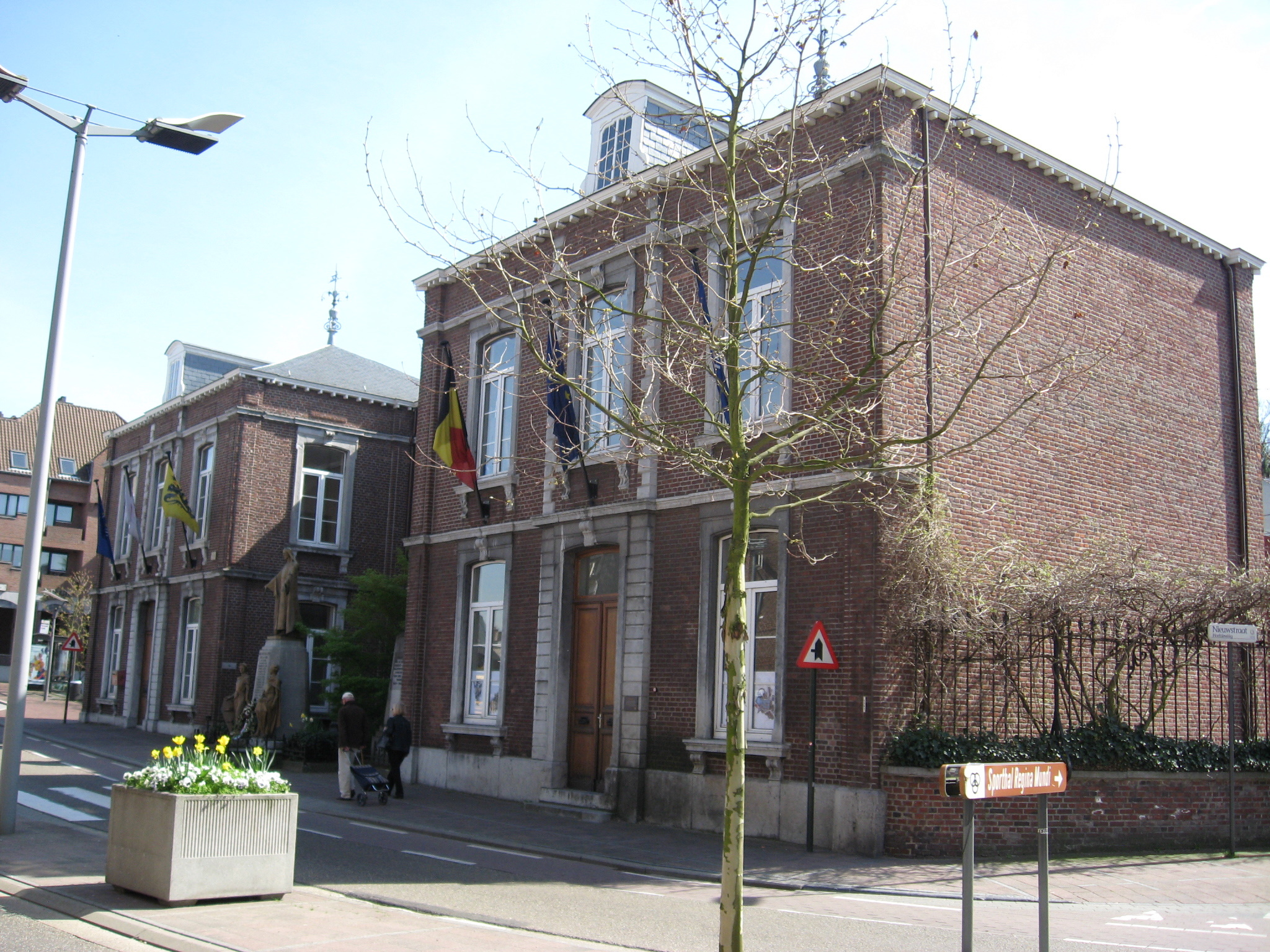
The Old Town Hall, built in neoclassical style

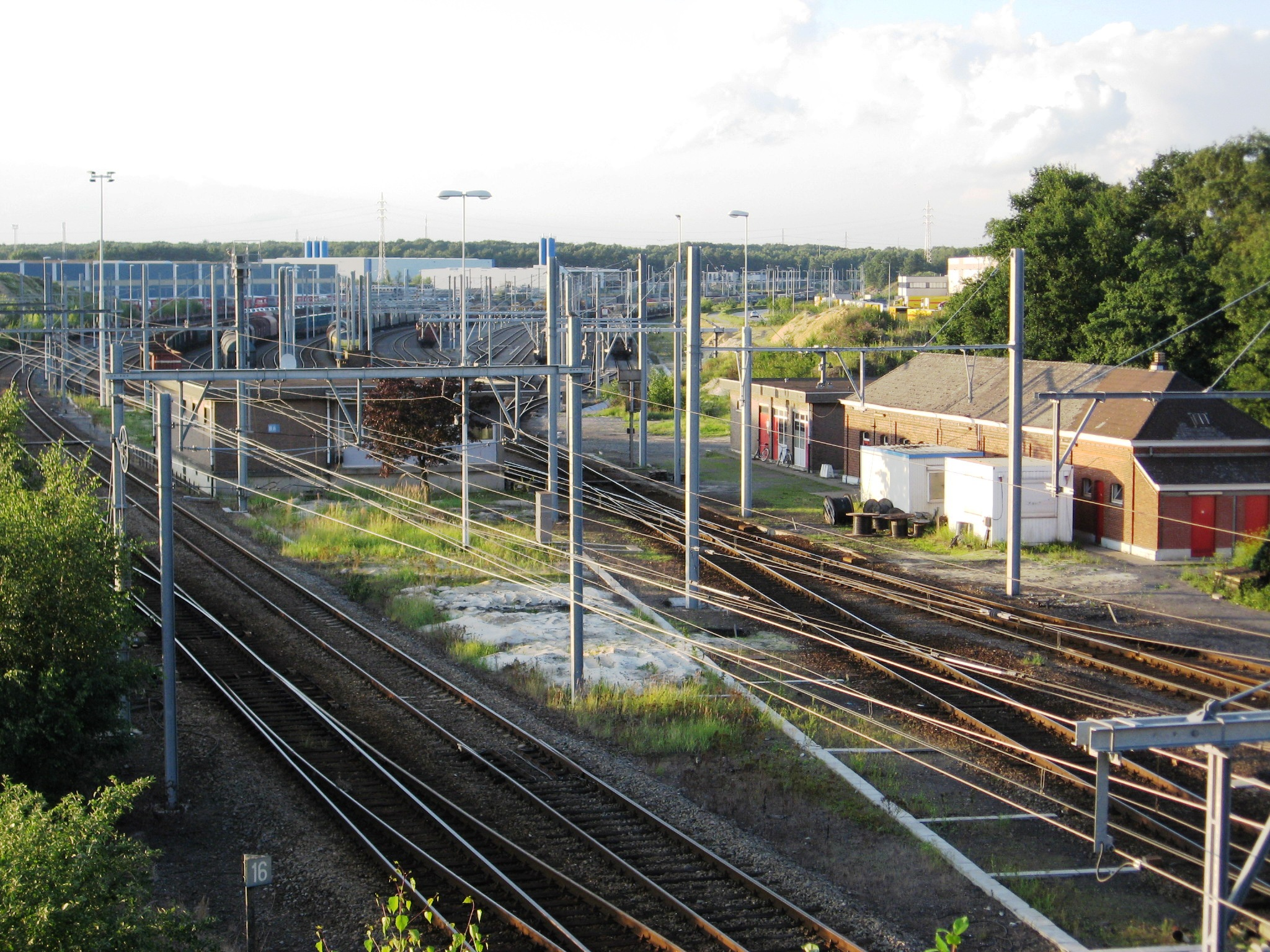
Train station Genk-Goederen

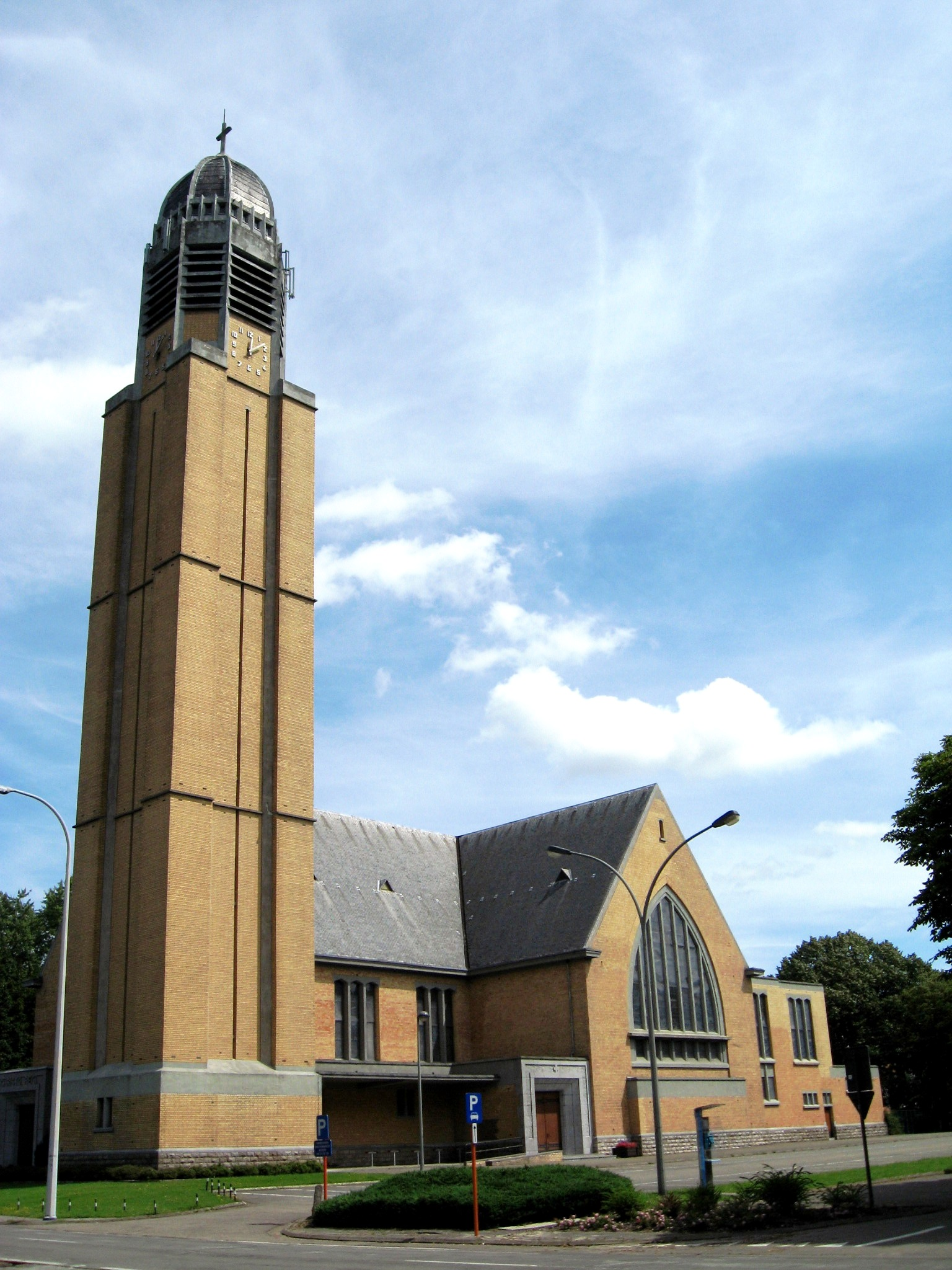
"Mine cathedral" of Christ the King

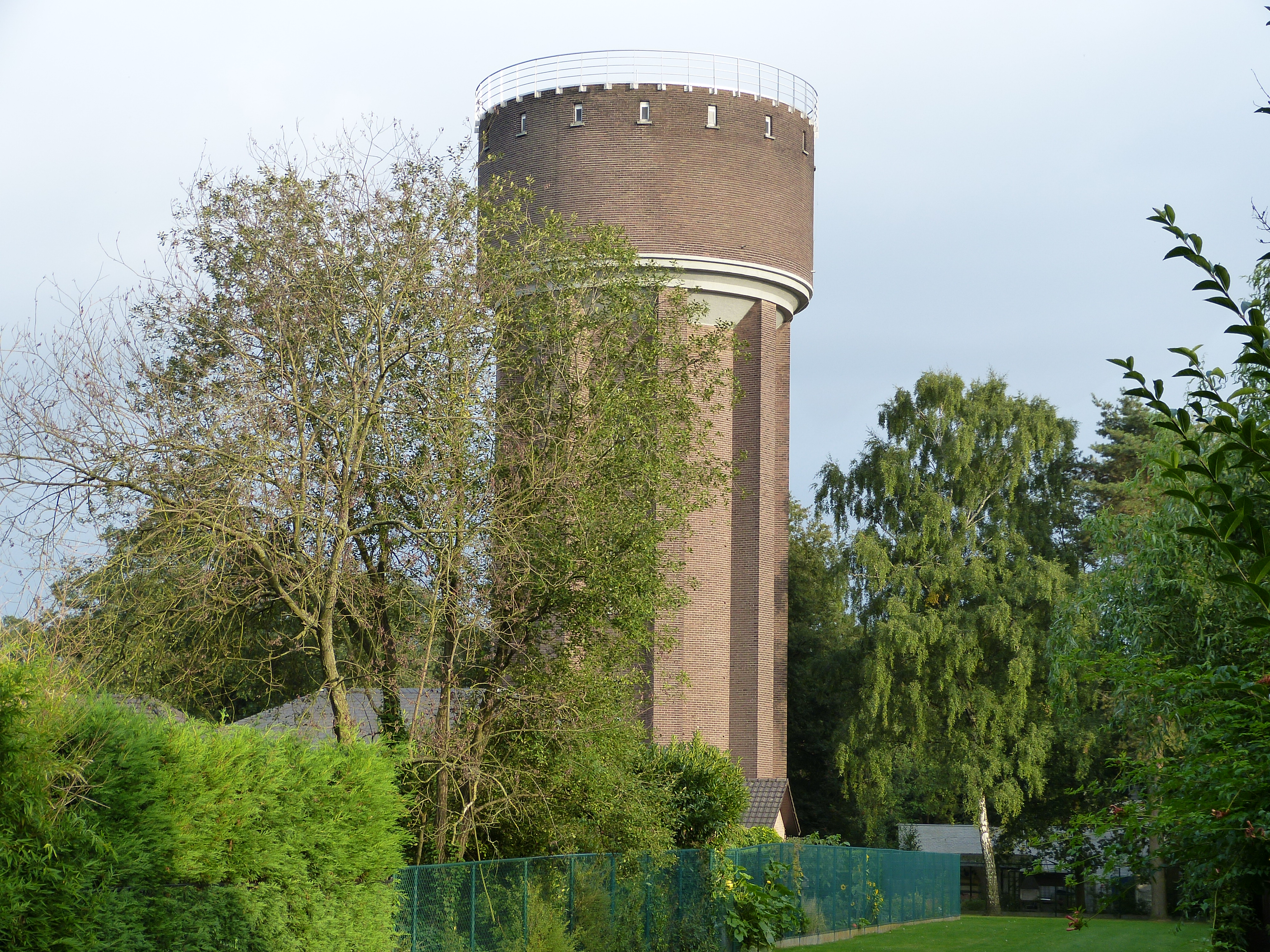
Water tower
