= Copycat (Apink Chobom song) =

2022 single by Apink Chobom

- Digital cover

Single by Apink Chobom
- Language: Korean
- B-side: "Oscar"; "Feel Something"
- Released: July 12, 2022
- Genre: Nu-disco; K-pop
- Length: 8:58
- Label: IST; Kakao
- Composers: Kella Armitage; GG Ramirez; Jurek
- Lyricist: Jo Yoon-kyung

"Copycat" is a song recorded by South Korean duo Apink Chobom. It was released on July 12, 2022, by IST Entertainment and Kakao Entertainment as their debut single on a single album of the same name. Written by Jo Yoon-kyung and composed by Kella Armitage, GG Ramirez, and Jurek, "Copycat" has been described as a nu-disco style K-pop song.

== Background and release ==
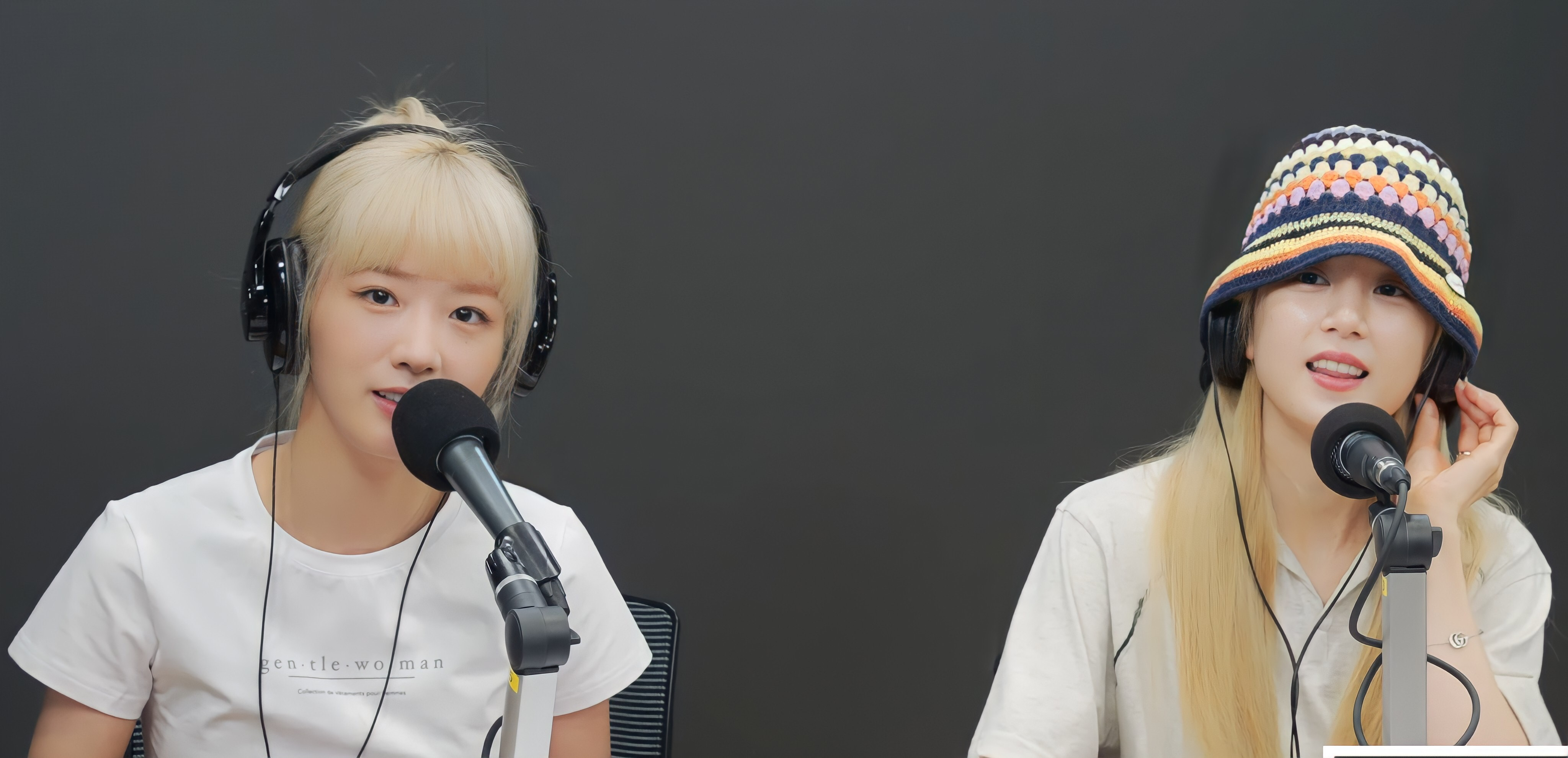
Apink Chobom in July 2022 (From left to right: Bomi and Chorong)

Chorong stated that the unit Apink Chobom was formed because she had heard of her resemblance to Bomi since Apink's debut, and "thought it would be fun for the two of us to form a unit". They began preparing for their debut following the end of Apink's activities for "Dilemma". On June 22, 2022, IST Entertainment announced that Apink Chobom would be releasing their debut single album Copycat on July 12.

"Copycat" was released as scheduled on that day and was distributed by Kakao Entertainment. The music video for "Copycat" was directed by Wanda and featured choreography from Kiel Tutin and Yoon Mi-yeon. Apink Chobom held a fan showcase on July 12, where the duo performed "Oscar" and "Copycat". It was hosted by Apink members Kim Nam-joo and Oh Ha-young, and Jung Eun-ji also made an appearance. To promote "Copycat", Apink Chobom performed the song on music programs like The Show.

== Composition ==
"Copycat" was written by Jo Yoon-kyung and composed by Kella Armitage, GG Ramirez, and Jurek. It has been described as nu-disco style and K-pop. In the middle of the song the melody briefly shifts from disco-pop to a familiar K-pop melody. Lyrically, it describes a "'mischievous imitator' that wants to copy everything of his or her loved one". "Copycat" was composed in the key of B major, with a tempo of 112 beats per minute. "Oscar" depicts lovers that act out lies, and uses the sound of windshield wipers and synths. "Feel Something" describes "the first steps of Chobom".

== Critical reception ==
Professional ratings
Review scores
Source	Rating
IZM	3/5 stars

Writing for Weverse Magazine, Na Won-young described "Copycat" as "essentially a study of what makes an Apink track categorically Apink: a combination of dense electronica, a subtle groove and a pop melody." Na also highlighted "Feel Something", writing that it "comes across as two separate tracks rather than an interconnected unit, while at the same time hinting at what makes this pair a duo and a subunit within a larger group". IZM's Jeong Da-yeol compared "Copycat" to Doja Cat and SZA's "Kiss Me More" and noted the hip-hop beat change in the second half of the song. Jeong also noted the "kitschy twin concept" that highlighted the duo's energy.

== Commercial performance ==
The single album Copycat sold 31,177 copies in its first week, with the physical album ranking 10th and the digital version ranking 25th on the Circle Album Chart. It sold 9,858 copies in the subsequent two weeks.

== Track listing ==
Track listing for Copycat
No.	Title	Lyrics	Music	Arrangement	Length
1.	"Copycat"	Jo Yoon-kyung	Kella Armitage; GG Ramirez; Jurek	Jurek	3:24
2.	"Oscar"	GDLO; Yelo (MonoTree)	GDLO; Yelo (MonoTree)	GDLO (MonoTree)	3:08
3.	"Feel Something"	Luvssong; Ryan S. Jhun; Alida Garpestad Peck; Ally Ahern; Marc Sibley; Nathan Cunningham	Ryan S. Jhun; Alida Garpestad Peck; Ally Ahern; Marc Sibley; Nathan Cunningham	Space Primates; Ryan S. Jhun	2:26
Total length:					8:58
