= Huw Thomas =

Huw Thomas may refer to:

- Huw Thomas (newsreader) (1927–2009), broadcaster, barrister and politician
- Huw Thomas (physician) (born 1958), physician and academic
- Huw Thomas (Labour politician) (born 1985), member of the Senedd; previously leader of Cardiff Council

== See also ==
- Hugh Thomas (disambiguation)
