= Clark Robert Smith =

American winemaker

Clark Robert Smith is a pioneering innovator in the wine industry. He is largely respected for his contributions to winemakers and the wine industry of California and worldwide. He has built many successful brands, consults on five continents, judges wines at several competitions and teaches winemaking in six universities.

== Early life and career ==
Clark's parents met at MIT. His father an Aviation Engineer earned a presidential commendation from Ronald Reagan for helping to build engines for the Apollo spacecraft. Clark's early life years were spent growing up on the East Coast, and Birmingham, Alabama where he attended the private school Indian Springs School. Clark has said this has impacted his ability to be a good writer. Clark attended MIT briefly, declined program completion, and went on to graduate as a top student and memorable pupil at U. C. Davis (1977–1983). Smith served as the founding winemaker for The R. H. Phillips Vineyard for its first seven years, taking it from 3,000 cases per year to 250,000. He implemented night time harvesting and published ground-breaking research on vineyard variables affecting wine quality. After spending the 1970s retailing wine in the East Bay, he began his winemaking career as cellarmaster for VeederCrest.

== Postmodern winemaking ==
In 1990, he began Vinovation, which became the world's largest winemaking consulting company with over 1200 clients around the world. Clark developed a postmodern winemaking system which rejects the solution chemistry model of winemaking and instead centers on building structure, integrating aroma, and promoting living soils. His Postmodern Winemaking from U.C. Press was named Wine and Spirits Magazine's 2013 Book Of The Year.

== Pioneering technologies ==
In the 1990s, Smith went on to patent reverse osmosis methods for alcohol removal and volatile acidity correction, founding the world's largest wine technology provider, Vinovation, and pioneering the implementation in American winemaking of micro-oxygenation, ultrafiltration, tartrate stabilization through electrodialysis, alternatives to sterile filtration. Smith sold Vinovation and its technology. Smith has been busy writing on postmodern winemaking, which rejects the solution chemistry model of winemaking and the reductionist approach to sensory evaluation, instead centering on structural integrity, aromatic integration, graceful longevity and soulful resonance with the environment in which wine is consumed. These realms have opened inquiries into living soils, vine balance, proper maturity, co-extraction, uses of oxygen, balancing reduction, minerality, microbial balance, and the relationship of wine and music. "Wine is not science, it's cuisine – the ultimate slow food."[Quote: Clark Robert Smith]

== Wine specialist ==
Smith is recognized as a leading authority on the enhancement of wine structure and a vocal proponent of living soil. His popular class on Fundamentals of Wine Chemistry has been attended by over 4,000 participants since 1984. David Darlington's biography of him in Wine & Spirits magazine won the James Beard award. He directs the Best of Appellation wine evaluations for AppellationAmerica.com, writes a monthly column, "The Postmodern Winemaker", for Wines and Vines magazine, and is an adjunct faculty member at California State University at Fresno and Florida International University. He was awarded "Innovator of the Year" by Wine Business Monthly magazine at their IQ Conference in March 2016.

== Wine alcohol reduction techniques ==
Clark is often quoted as talking about finding the "sweet spot" in a wine, which is the point at which wine has achieved its optimal taste and aroma or "nose". This is determined by the alcohol percentage in the wine.

== Author, writer, columnist and teacher ==
In 1993, Smith started WineSmith.com to explore a range of California terroirs with Cabernet Franc, Cabernet Sauvignon, Chardonnay and Roman Syrah made according to European principles. A long drive practicing wine maker Clark began making the wines for Diamond Ridge Vineyards in 2007, of a unique high altitude site in Lake County. Clark is an editor and contributing writer to many Wine related topics and Magazines. Clark is a contributing Writer, Columnist and Editor for Appellation America, Wine and Vines Magazine "The Postmodern Winemaker". Clark has worked in six Universities and Colleges as an adjunct lecturer. He has taught courses for over 20yrs, at University of California at Davis, Napa Valley College, Fresno State University, Southwest Missouri State University, Florida International University and L'Academie du Vin in Tokyo.

== Musician ==
In recent years, Smith has become increasingly interested in the study of the relationship of wine and music cognition. A composer and vocalist, He sings baritone for the men's chorus Sonoma Chanson, was elected President for 2017 of the Redwood Chordsmen, and sings baritone in the barbershop quartet, "Sound Logic". He is currently engaged in the production of a CD of original songs about real life in the Wine Industry. He resides in Santa Rosa, California.
