= Artie Thomas =

Australian rules footballer

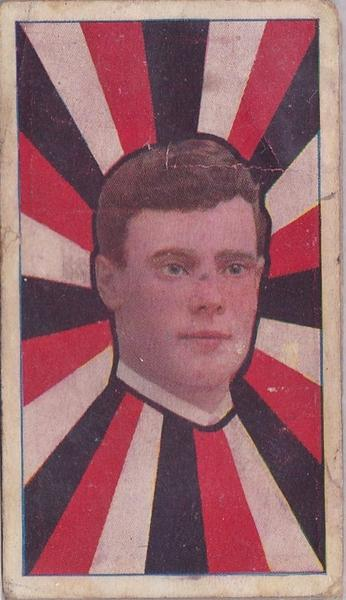
- Cigarette card on Thomas in 1911

Personal information
- Full name: Arthur John Thomas
- Born: 21 September 1884; Collingwood, Victoria
- Died: 7 May 1960 (aged 75); Kew, Victoria
- Original team: Brunswick
- Weight: 64

Playing career^{1}
Years	Club	Games (Goals)
1910–1913	St Kilda	53 (29)
- ^{1} Playing statistics correct to the end of 1913.

Arthur John Thomas (21 September 1884 – 7 May 1960) was an Australian rules footballer who played with St Kilda in the Victorian Football League (VFL).

After arriving from Brunswick in 1910, Thomas played 17 games in his debut season and kicked 15 goals, which were enough to top the goal-kicker. A rover, he appeared in three further seasons for St Kilda. His brother, Hugh Thomas, coached St Kilda in the 1940s.
