= Yoon Bo-mi =

South Korean singer and actress (born 1993)

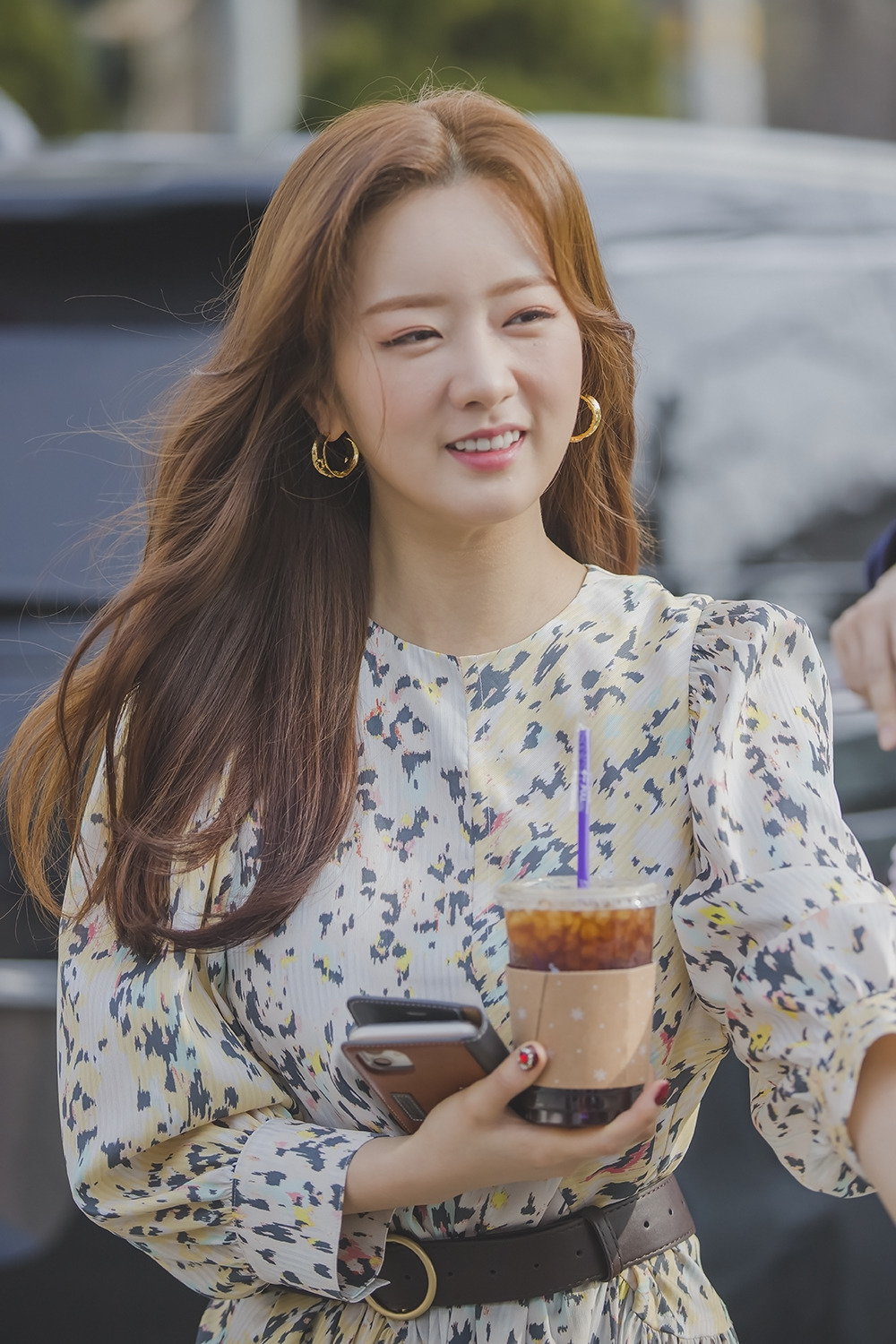
- Yoon in January 2020
- Born: August 13, 1993 (age 33); Suwon, South Korea
- Education: Korean Arts High School
- Occupations: Singer; actress
- Years active: 2011–present
- Spouse: Rado (m. 2026)
- Musical career
- Genre: K-pop
- Instrument: Vocals
- Labels: IST; Choi Creative Lab; With Us Entertainment
- Member of: Apink

Korean name
- Hangul: 윤보미
- RR: Yun Bomi
- MR: Yun Pomi

Yoon Bo-mi (Korean: 윤보미; born August 13, 1993), known mononymously as Bomi, is a South Korean singer and actress. She is best known as a member of the South Korean girl group Apink. Yoon made her acting debut with a cameo role in the 2012 television series Reply 1997, she then starred in various television series such as Because This Is My First Life (2017), Please Don't Date Him (2020), and gained attention through her supporting role in Queen of Tears (2024).

== Early life and education ==
Yoon Bo-mi was born in Gwonseon District, Suwon, South Korea, on August 13, 1993. She has one older sister and a younger brother. She was trained in the martial art of Taekwondo from the age of five and is a holder of a third degree black belt. She attended Youngshin Girls High School and later on, Korean Arts High School; from where she graduated in February 2012. Upon graduation from high school, she decided to postpone her further studies in college to concentrate on her music career.

== Career ==
=== 2011: Apink ===
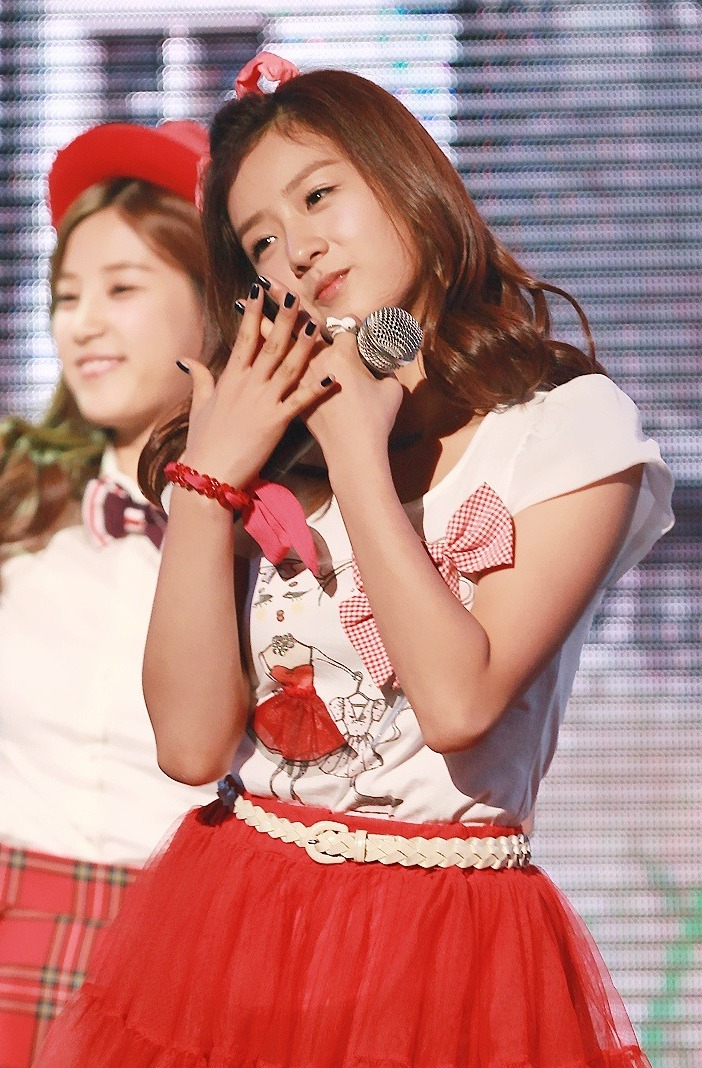
Yoon performing in September 2011

Yoon was formally introduced as a member of Apink through the group's reality show, Apink News. Yoon debuted with Apink on Mnet's M! Countdown performing their songs "I Don't Know (몰라요; Mollayo)", and "Wishlist" which were included on their debut EP Seven Springs of Apink.

=== 2012–present: Solo activities, ChoBom, and raising popularity ===
In 2012, Yoon, along with Apink co-member Chorong had a cameo role in the television series Reply 1997, where she portrayed the teenage version of Moon Jeong-mi, the deceased mother of Yoon Yoon-jae.

Yoon was an MC on the variety show Weekly Idol from July 17, 2013, to July 8, 2015. In late 2013, she appeared in K-Hunter's "Marry Me" music video and was featured in hip-hop group M.I.B's song "Let's Talk About You".

In 2014, she joined the cast of the variety show The Human Condition.

In early 2015, Yoon was cast in MBC's Real Men female special. On May 11, she was featured in David Oh's debut song "I Know, I Know". and on June 16, she released a duet with Im Seulong titled "Lovely" for variety show Some Guys, Some Girls. On September 24, she was featured in Yoon Hyun-sang's digital single "Let's Eat Together", she also starred in the music video. In September 2015, she was cast in KBS' 10-episode web television series Love Profiler K as top star Yuna, which aired in November on Naver.

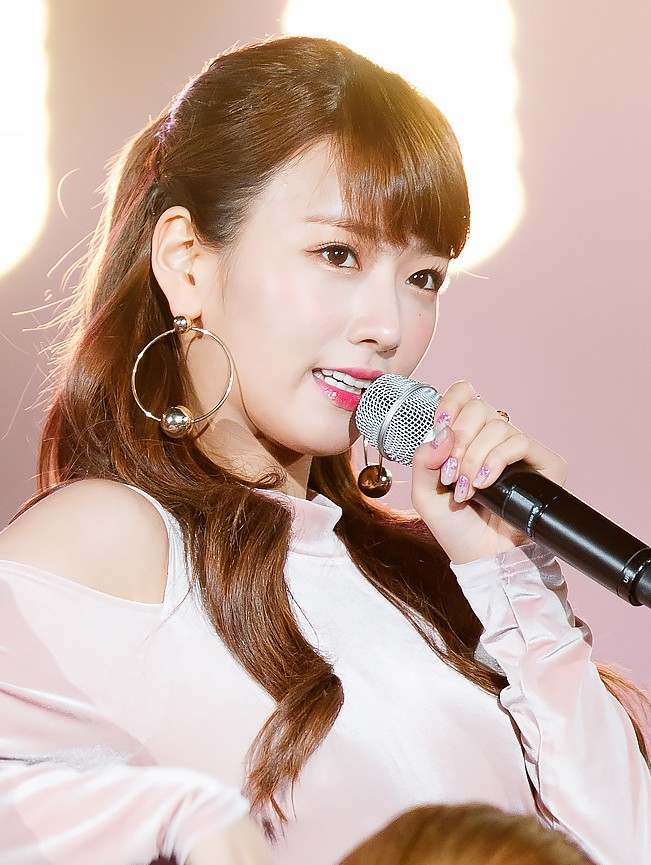
Yoon performing in 2016

In January 2016, Yoon and fellow member Kim Nam-joo became the new MCs of Shikshin Road 2. She then joined the fourth season of We Got Married along with actor Choi Tae-joon who serves as her virtual husband on the show.

In 2017, Yoon was cast in a supporting role in the romantic comedy television series Because This Is My First Life.

In March 2020, Yoon was a lead cast member in the web television series Oppa Will Date Instead. In October, she joined the cast of the television series Please Don't Date Him, which stars Song Ha-yoon and Lee Jun-young. The multi-part television series aired on South Korea's MBC network on November 10, 2020.

In June 2022, Yoon along with Chorong formed Apink's new sub-unit called "ChoBom", they released their first single album Copycat on July 12. In August 2022, Yoon made her musical debut in Wonder Ticket.

On April 28, 2023, IST Entertainment announced that Yoon did not renew her contract with the company but will still be part of Apink. On the same day, Yoon signed an exclusive contract with Choi Creative Lab.

In February 2024, Yoon was cast in tvN's series Queen of Tears portraying the role of Secretary Na. The series later became the highest viewership in tvN's history with 24.9% in the last episode, and also gained global popularity with 400 millions accumulative views on Netflix.

== Personal life ==
In April 2024, Dispatch reported that Yoon had been dating Rado from Black Eyed Pilseung since 2017 with both their agencies confirming the news. The pair met when Rado was producing Apink's "Only One" track in 2016. On December 18, 2025, Yoon announced their engagement and they married on May 16, 2026.

== Discography ==
=== Singles ===
Title	Year	Peak chart positions	Album
Title	Year	KOR Gaon	Album
As featured artist
"Let's Talk About You" (M.I.B featuring Yoon Bo-mi)	2013	38	The Maginot Line
"Let's Eat Together" (Yoon Hyun-sang featuring Yoon Bo-mi)	2015	61	Non-album single
"Pretty Girl" (Mighty Mouth featuring Yoon Bo-mi)	2018	— (Note: "Pretty Girl" didn't enter Gaon Digital Chart, but peaked at position 57 on Gaon BGM Chart.)	Non-album single
Collaboration
"I Know I Know" (Yoon Bo-mi with David Oh)	2015	96	Non-album single
"Our Night Is More Beautiful Than Your Day" (Yoon Bo-mi with various artists)	2016	89	Summer11 Project
"Vaccine" (Woo Tae-woo and I-One featuring Yoon Bomi)	2021	—	Non-album single
"—" denotes a recording that did not chart

=== Soundtrack appearances ===
Title	Year	Peak chart positions	Album
Title	Year	KOR Gaon	Album
"Lovely" (Yoon Bo-mi with Lim Seul-ong)	2015	64	Some Guys, Some Girls OST
"Without You"	2016	— (Note: "Without You" didn't enter Gaon Digital Chart, but peaked at position 34 on Gaon BGM Chart.)	Cinderella with Four Knights OST
"I Pray 4 You" (Yoon Bo-mi with Kim Nam-joo)	2017	—	School 2017 OST
"—" denotes a recording that did not chart

=== Composition credits ===
All song credits are adapted from the Korea Music Copyright Association's database unless stated otherwise.

List of songs, showing year released, artist name, and name of the album
Title	Year	Artist	Album	Composer	Lyricist
"Dear (Whisper)"	2016	Apink	Dear	Yes	Yes
"Lost Piece"	2016	Apink	Dear	No	Yes
"Thank You" (고마워)	2021	Apink	Non-album single	No	Yes

== Filmography ==
=== Television series ===
Year	Title	Role	Notes	Ref.
2012	Reply 1997	Moon Jung-mi	Cameo (Episode 9)	
2017	Because This Is My First Life	Yoon Bo-mi		
2019–2020	Farming Academy	Kang Han-byul		
2020	Please Don't Date Him	Moon Ye-seul		
2024	Queen of Tears	Na Chae-yeon		

=== Web series ===
Year	Title	Role	Ref.
2015	Love Detective Sherlock K	Yoo-na	
2020	Oppa Will Date Instead	Oh Min-joo	

=== Television shows ===
Year	Title	Role	Notes	Ref.
2016	Shikshin Road 2	Co-host	With Kim Nam-joo	
2016	My Little Television	Participant	Episode 67–68	
2016–2017	We Got Married	Cast member	With Choi Tae-joon (Episodes 341–363)	
2018	Pocha Beyond Borders (Olive Pocha)	Co-host	Episode 8–13 (in Denmark)	
2019	Legendary Big Fishing	Co-host		
2019	TMI News	Reporter	Episode 1–8	
2019	Battle Trip	Co-host	Episode 159–177	
2020–2021	Witches	Cast member	Season 1–2	
2022	Eden, Descendants of Instinct	Host	Season 1–2	
2024	I'm SOLO: Love Continues	Host		

=== Web shows ===
Year	Title	Role	Notes	Ref.
2022	X: New World	Cast Member	Season 2	

=== Radio shows ===
Year	Title	Role	Notes	Ref.
2022	Dream Radio	Special DJ	March 21–27, 2022; with Oh Ha-young	

== Theater ==
Year	Title	Role	Ref.
2022	Wonder Ticket (원더티켓)	Hana	

== Awards and nominations ==
Name of the award ceremony, year presented, category, nominee of the award, and the result of the nomination
Award	Year	Category	Nominee(s) / Work(s)	Result	Ref.
Brand Customer Loyalty Awards	2020	Most Influential Celebrity YouTuber	Yoon Bo-mi	Won	
KBS Entertainment Awards	2019	New Rookie Entertainer	Battle Trip	Nominated	
MBC Entertainment Awards	2016	Best Couple Award	We Got Married (Season 4) (with Choi Tae-joon)	Nominated	
Daejeon Special Film Festival	2024	Best Supporting Actress	Queen of Tears	Won	
