= David Y. Oh =

American spacecraft systems engineer

David Y. Oh Sc.D.
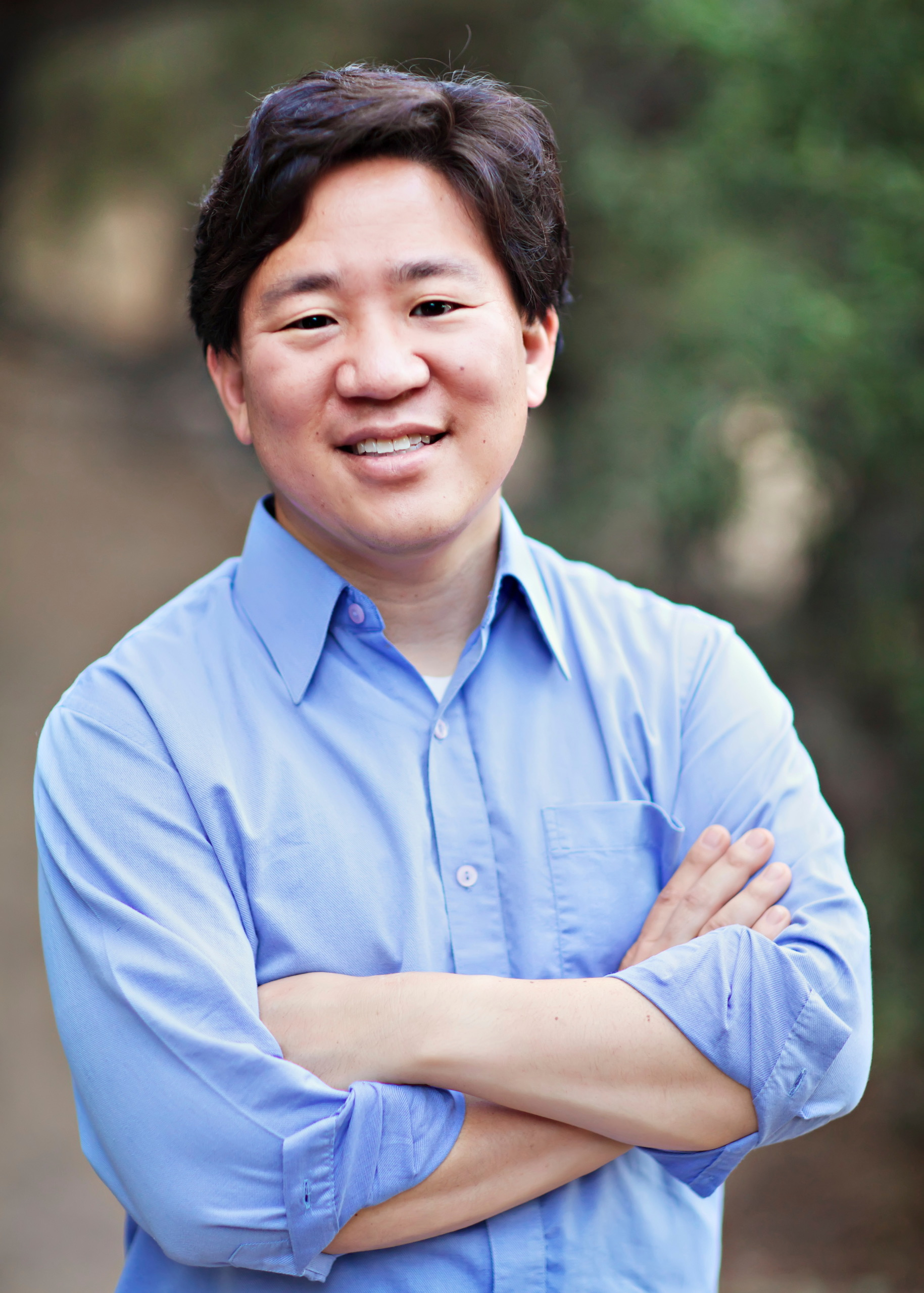
- Education: Massachusetts Institute of Technology (Sc.D. Aeronautics and Astronautics, 1997; M.S. Aeronautics and Astronautics, 1993; B.S. Aeronautics and Astronautics, B.S. Music, 1991); Indian Springs School (High school diploma, 1987)
- Known for: Psyche (spacecraft); Living on Mars time; Mars Science Laboratory (Curiosity rover)
- Spouse: Bryn Oh
- Scientific career
- Fields: Aerospace engineering; Systems engineering; Electric propulsion
- Workplaces: Jet Propulsion Laboratory; Space Systems Loral
- Thesis: Computational modeling of expanding plasma plumes in space using a PIC-DSMC algorithm (1997)
- Doctoral advisor: Daniel E. Hastings

David Y. Oh is an American spacecraft systems engineer and expert in electric propulsion. Dr. Oh currently works at the Jet Propulsion Laboratory (JPL) as the NASA Psyche mission chief engineer. Prior to this role he served as the Project Systems Engineering Manager for Psyche. He was also the cross-cutting phase lead and lead flight director for the NASA Mars Science Laboratory mission (Curiosity Mars rover) and was recognized in popular media for living on Mars time with his family during the month following the landing of the Curiosity rover.

== Early life and education ==
David Oh was raised in Birmingham, Alabama and graduated from Indian Springs School in 1987.

He attended the Massachusetts Institute of Technology where he earned Bachelors of Science degrees in Aeronautics and Astronautics (1991) and in Humanities, Music (1991). He went on to earn both a master's degree (1993) and a Doctor of Science degree (1997) in Aeronautics and Astronautics from MIT. For his doctoral thesis, Dr. Oh developed the first Particle-In-Cell Direct Simulation Monte-Carlo (PIC-DSMC) model to simulate the plasma plume ejected by a Hall-effect thruster.

He married his wife, Bryn, in 1995. They have three children: Braden, Ashlyn, and Devyn.

== Career ==
From 1996 to 2003, Oh worked for Space Systems/Loral (SS/L). He served as an electrical systems engineer on commercial communications satellite programs including IPSTAR, Europe*star, and Multi-Media Asia. While at SS/L, Oh led the systems engineering efforts for both the SPT-100 and SPT-140 Hall effect thrusters, pioneering the adoption of Hall thrusters in commercial satellites by being the first to show analytically that Hall thrusters offer optimum specific impulse for chemical-electric orbit raising to geostationary orbit.

In 2003, Oh moved to NASA's Jet Propulsion Laboratory. In JPL's Deep Space Mission Architectures Group he was the lead systems engineer for the GRAIL step 1 Discovery proposal and the ST9 Aerocapture Phase A study for the New Millennium Program. GRAIL went on to become a flight project in NASA's Discovery Program.

In 2006, Oh joined the Mars Science Laboratory (Curiosity Rover) team. As the cross-cutting comain lead he led two multidisciplinary teams through the design, testing, and delivery of the core avionics, thermal, and communications systems flying on MSL.

In 2011, Oh became MSL's Lead Flight Director. When Curiosity landed in August 2012, Dr. Oh's wife and three school-aged children joined him when he lived on Mars time for the month following Curiosity's landing. Their adventures garnered worldwide media attention.

After Curiosity's early surface operations, Oh moved back into mission formulation as the Planetary Missions Portfolio Systems Engineer where he managed new mission development for JPL's Discovery and New Frontiers portfolios. Most notably, he served as Capture Lead for the mission Psyche: Journey to a Metal World, successfully leading a JPL proposal team from initial concept through NASA's Discovery program step 1. During step 2 he served the dual role of Capture Lead and Project Systems Engineer, leading his team to winning step 2 and moving Psyche from a proposed project to a flight project.

From 2017 to 2022, Oh served as the Project Systems Engineering Manager for Psyche, leading the systems engineering team and acting as Engineering Technical Authority. In 2022, Oh became Psyche's chief engineer. Psyche is currently a $900M Discovery Class deep space science exploration mission and will be the first space mission to use Hall-effect thrusters beyond lunar orbit, using two SPT-140 thrusters to explore the asteroid belt.

== Awards ==
In addition to receiving a variety of NASA and JPL awards, Oh received a NASA Exceptional Achievement Medal in 2013 for the design, testing, and delivery of the core flight system functionality as the Cross-Cutting Domain Lead for MSL, the Korean Economic Institute's Recognition for Outstanding Contributions to the United States and Korean American community in science and technology in 2017, and a NASA Exceptional Engineering Achievement Medal in 2026 for exceptional engineering achievement in significantly advancing the state of solar-electric propulsion architectures to enable planetary missions of exploration. He was inducted as a Fellow of the American Institute of Aeronautics and Astronautics in 2026 for his “expertise in electric propulsion systems engineering and vital contributions to the widespread adoption of Hall thrusters into commercial and government space missions.”

== Patents ==
- US 6,332,590: Photoemission based spacecraft charging sensor
- US 6,478,257: Phase change material thermal control for electric propulsion
- US 6,543,723: Electric orbit raising with variable thrust
- US 6,581,880: Energy managed electric propulsion methods & systems for stationkeeping satellites
- US 10,954,005 B1: Power train for deep space solar electric propulsion

== See also ==
- Bobak Ferdowsi
- Daniel E. Hastings
- Lindy Elkins-Tanton
