= Hugh Thomas (coach) =

Australian rules football coach (born 1976)

Personal information
- Full name: Hugh Thomas
- Died: 18 December 1976 (aged 86)

Coaching career
Years	Club	Games (W–L–D)
1944–1945	St Kilda	38 (8–28–2)
1950	Preston (VFA)	19 (3–16–0)

Hugh Thomas (died 18 December 1976) was an Australian rules football coach who coached St Kilda in the Victorian Football League (VFL).

Thomas served initially as an assistant coach to Jock McHale at Collingwood, in what was a successful era for the club. He became St Kilda's senior coach in 1944 and steered them to ninth position, with six wins and two draws during the year. After they struggled in 1945, Thomas was replaced by Allan Hird. In 1950, he coached VFA club Preston for the year.

His brother Artie was a rover at St Kilda from 1910 to 1913.
