= Daniel E. Hastings =

American physicist

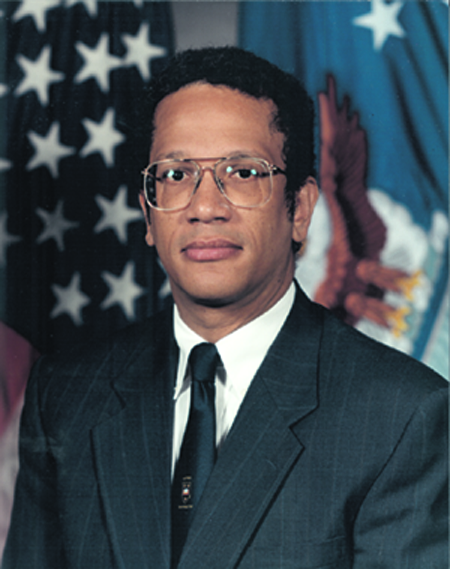
- Education: MIT
- Scientific career
- Fields: Physics
- Workplaces: MIT; US Air Force; Singapore-MIT Alliance for Research and Technology
- Thesis: The high‐β universal drift mode

Daniel E. Hastings is an American physicist, currently the Cecil and Ida Green Education Professor and the former director of the Singapore-MIT Alliance for Research and Technology (SMART) at the Massachusetts Institute of Technology. Hastings became head of the Department of Aeronautics and Astronautics on January 1, 2019. He has served as the chief scientist of the US Air Force and on many national level boards.

Hastings earned his B.A. at Oxford University in the UK (1976) and his S.M. (1978) and Ph.D. (1980) at the Massachusetts Institute of Technology, writing his doctoral thesis on "The high‐β universal drift mode."

Hastings worked at Physical Sciences Inc from 1980 to 1981 and then Oak Ridge National Lab Fusion Energy Division from 1981 to 1985. He returned to MIT as an assistant professor (1985-1988). Hastings was an associate professor (1988-1993) and later full professor for the Department of Aeronautics and Astronautics at MIT (1993–present). He was also the associate department head of research (1993-1996). He took a leave to be the chief scientist of the US Air Force (1997-1999) and served on the National Science Board from 2002-2008. Dr. Hastings was asked to direct the Technology and Policy Program (TPP) at MIT (2000-2003) as well as associate director and co-director of the Engineering Systems Division (2000-2004), and later became its director (2004-2005). Dr. Hastings became the Dean for Undergraduate Education (2006-2013) and then the CEO and director of the Singapore-MIT Alliance for Research and Technology (2014-2018). As of January 1, 2019, he is the head of the Department of Aeronautics and Astronautics.

Hastings has received many honors, including membership to the National Academy of Engineering (2017) for contributions in spacecraft and space system-environment interactions, space system architecture, and leadership in aerospace research and education. He also holds fellowship in the Institute of the Aeronautical Sciences (1998), and the Air Force Distinguished Civilian Award (1997, 1999).

== Academic work ==
Hastings has published extensively in aerospace engineering, including a highly cited textbook called Spacecraft-environment interactions. His research includes uncertainty and systems' engineering.
