= Europlanetarium Genk =

People's observatory and planetarium in Genk, Belgium

Coordinates: 50°57′26″N 5°32′5″E

The Europlanetarium Genk is a public observatory and planetarium in Genk, Belgium.

== History ==
=== Observatory ===
Lode Vanhoutte started the Jonge Onderzoekers (young researchers) group in Genk following the Moon landing in 1969. They did popular scientific work and studied many subjects. Astronomy gathered the most interest, and in 1972 they joined the Vereniging Voor Sterrenkunde (Association for Astronomy, abbreviated VVS) as the youth organization JVS-Descartes. The observatories of Grimbergen and Hove had already been operating for many years at that time. The VVS, and especially Armand Pien (former television weatherman), suggested establishing a public observatory in every Flemish province. Genk was proposed for the third Flemish public observatory.

The plan to construct a public observatory was first promoted in 1977. It was initially planned to build a small observatory, but the proposal grew to a larger-scale observatory with a professional style. A course teaching General Astronomy for novices started in 1979, while a small group of VVS members worked on founding the observatory. The plans of the observatory included a dome building and an exhibition space. The actual dome and telescope room would be 5 m (16,40 feet) above the ground floor. This is in contrast with a "classic observatory", which is square with a ring beam in the ceiling that supports the dome. It was decided to build the dome locally to keep the prices down and maintain a good relationship with the municipality.

The building was finished in 1983. The active members of the observatory finished beside the self-built dome, which was also a large part of the interior design. The eventual opening was in 1984.

A geological garden was added 9 July 1988, which includes a coalmine shaft display in connection with the city's history.

=== Planetarium ===
The addition of a planetarium was proposed to attract tourists and provide educational opportunities. There were three partners for the construction: the European Economic Community (50%), the Flemish General Commissioner's office for Tourism (40%), and the city of Genk (10%). The European Economic Community gave permission for the project in 1987. Two files were prepared, for the planetarium instrument and the construction. Architect Jos Hanssen made a design that would cost €450,000.

The plans weren't fully completed, as costs came close to €600,000. The upper story was not placed, though it was considered as an option for the future. The offices, the auditorium, and the extra toilets were also removed from the plans. At the end of 1989, at least 20% of the subsidized amount had to be spent on the planetarium project. The construction of the planetarium started, and it was decided to purchase the medium-sized Spacemaster planetarium projector from East Germany and a dome with a diameter of 12.5 meters (41.01 feet). The construction and installation of the instrument finished in January 1991, rather than 1990 as originally planned.

During the summer holidays of 1991, the planetarium started with test shows for various groups, but there were still no seats. The 90 seats were finally installed in December 1991, along with the last of the sound equipment and landscaping. Host Armand Pien, together with about 200 guests, finally declared the opening of the planetarium on 20 December 1991.

Until May 1992, there were only live shows because the full installation was not yet finished. Seven monitors provided a planetarium show with various themes. After the completion of the installation automated projections began, though some live shows are still held, particularly for school groups.

=== Later additions ===
In 1993, an expansion of both the audio-visual capabilities and the planetarium itself began, starting with the addition of an auditorium and office space. A planet themed path that connects the Europlanetarium with adjoining Kattevennen was also added.

A laser projector was added in 1998, along with a new planetarium show, "Mars, back to the red planet."

In 2007, adjoining Kattevennen became an entrance to the Hoge Kempen National Park. A new visitors center was built that sells tickets and has a gift shop for the Europlanetarium.

== See also ==
- List of astronomical observatories
- List of astronomical societies
- List of planetariums
