= David Oh (musician) =

Korean-American singer (born 1991)

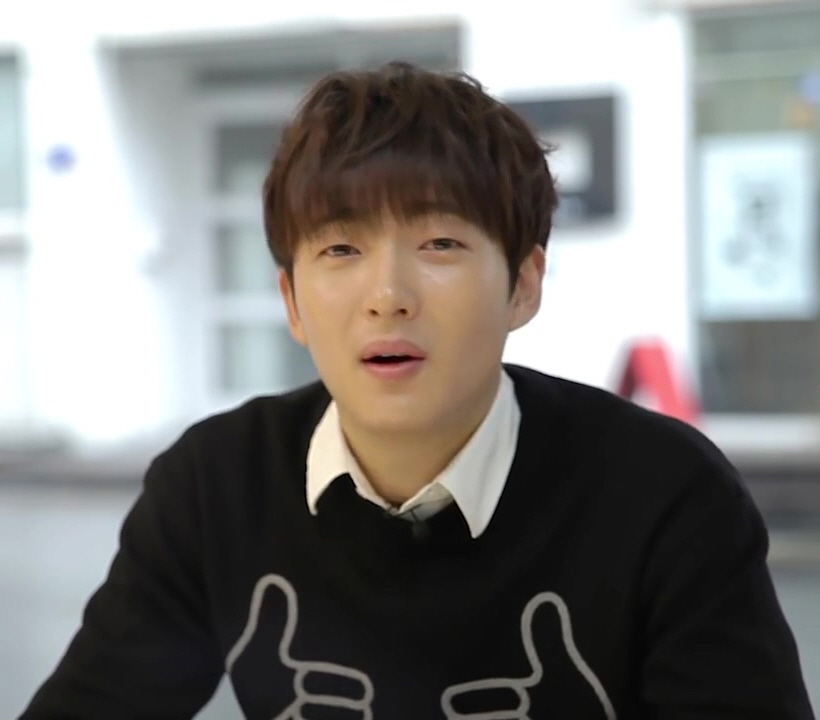

Background information
- Also known as: Oh Se-hun
- Born: June 29, 1991 (age 35); San Francisco, California
- Genres: K-pop
- Occupation: Singer
- Years active: 2010-present
- Label: localhigh records(JMG)

Korean name
- Hangul: 오세훈
- RR: O Sehun
- MR: O Sehun

David Oh (Korean: 데이비드 오, Korean name: Oh Se-hun; Korean: 오세훈; born June 29, 1991) is an American singer based in South Korea. He competed in the 2010 MBC reality television series The Great Birth, placing in the top five. He subsequently was a cast member on the 2011 variety show We Got Married, appearing alongside the singer RiSe. He released his first extended play, Skinships, in 2016.

== Discography ==
=== Extended plays ===
Title	Album details	Peak chart positions	Sales
Title	Album details	KOR	Sales
Skinships	Released: April 8, 2016; Label: Gon Entertainment; Format: CD, digital download	35	—N/a
Speech Bubble	Released: October 30, 2016; Label: Gon Entertainment; Format: CD, digital download	—	—N/a

=== Singles ===
Title	Year	Peak chart positions	Sales	Album
Title	Year	KOR	Sales	Album
"I Know I Know" (알아 알아) with Yoon Bo-mi	2015	96	KOR: 21,575	Non-album single
"W.D.I.A.G.W. (Where Did It All Go Wrong)"	2016	—	—N/a	Skinships
"Speech Bubble" (말풍선)	2016	—	—N/a	Speech Bubble
