= Hugh Thomas (choral conductor) =

American choral conductor, pianist and educator

Joseph Hugh Thomas was an American choral conductor, pianist and educator, perhaps best remembered for his role as conductor of the Concert Choir of Birmingham–Southern College (BSC), a liberal arts college located in Birmingham, Alabama. He served for many years as chairman of the Department of Music at BSC. His work has been honored numerous times by professional organizations such as the American Choral Directors Association.

== Career ==
As stated on the website of the Birmingham–Southern Department of Music, "The Concert Choir’s history began with late BSC music professors Raymond Anderson and Hugh Thomas. Each brought his great musicianship and dedication to the Concert Choir and established the foundation of quality the college strives to continue today." An endowed professorship at Birmingham-Southern in honor of Thomas is held by Lester Seigel, the current conductor of the Concert Choir.

Thomas also conducted the Birmingham Concert Chorale, which was founded in 1966 and is affiliated with the Alabama Symphony Orchestra.

== Notable students ==
A list of notable students of Hugh Thomas includes Ray Reach, former instructor of music technology at the University of Alabama at Birmingham (UAB) and director of the UAB Jazz Ensemble, currently Director of Student Jazz Programs at the Alabama Jazz Hall of Fame.
