= List of Hwasa live performances =

This is a list of concert tours and live performances by the South Korean singer-songwriter Hwasa.

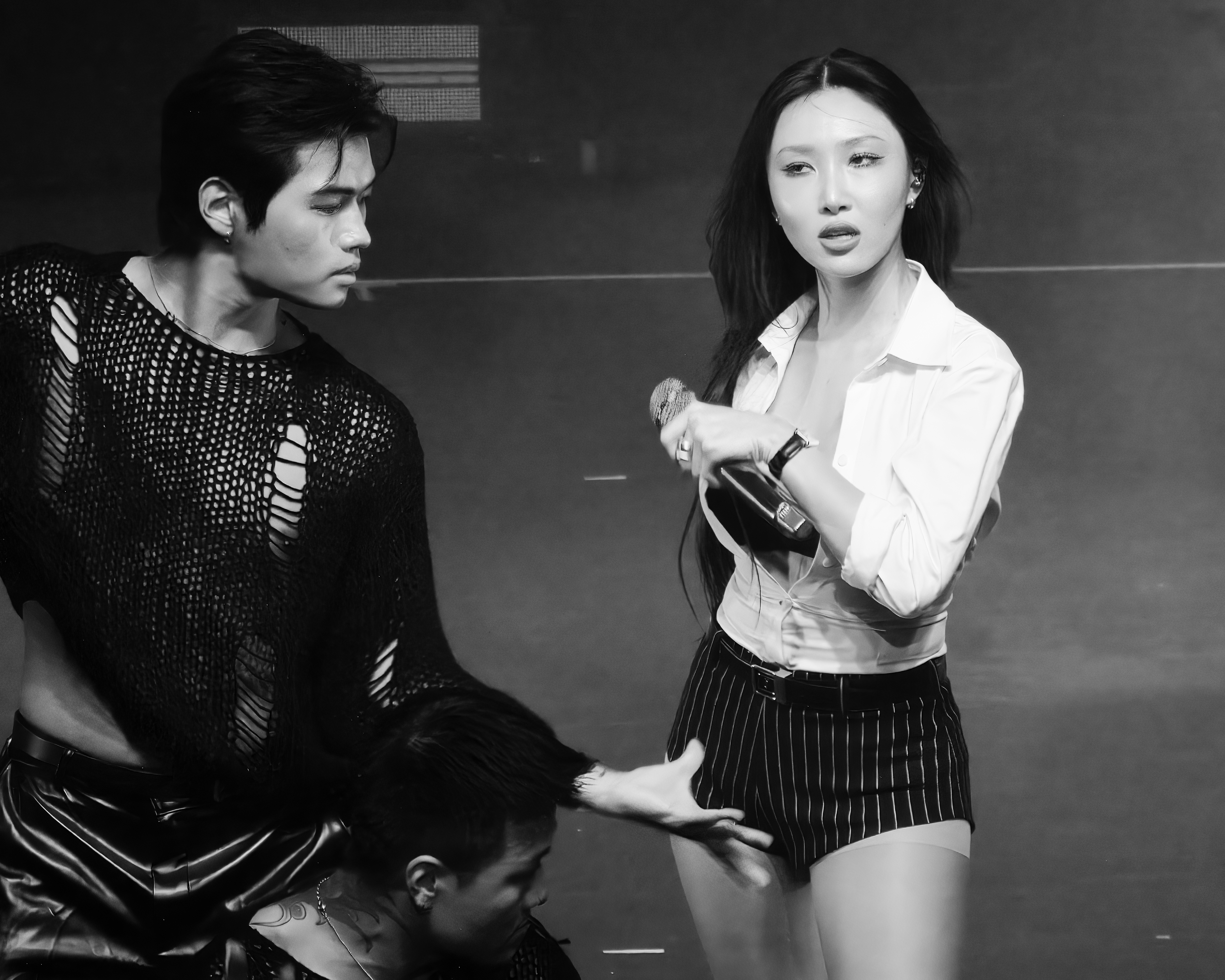
Hwasa performing during 'TWITS' tour in 2025

== Twits ==
Concert dates
Date	City	Country	Venue
Asia
April 20, 2024	Seoul	South Korea	Daeyang Hall, Sejong University
May 11, 2024	Hong Kong		AsiaWorld-Expo
June 16, 2024	Taipei	Taiwan	Taipei Nangang Exhibition Center
June 22, 2024	Singapore		The Star Performing Arts Centre
North America
March 11, 2025	Seattle	United States	Moore Theatre
March 13, 2025	Oakland	United States	Paramount Theatre
March 16, 2025	Los Angeles	United States	Orpheum Theatre
March 19, 2025	Dallas	United States	Majestic Theatre
March 21, 2025	Houston	United States	Bayou Music Center
March 23, 2025	Atlanta	United States	Coca-Cola Roxy
March 25, 2025	Washington, D.C.	United States	Warner Theatre
March 27, 2025	Brooklyn	United States	Brooklyn Paramount Theater
March 30, 2025	Boston	United States	MGM Music Hall at Fenway
April 1, 2025	Toronto	Canada	HISTORY
April 3, 2025	Chicago	United States	The Auditorium
Asia
August 10, 2025	Bangkok	Thailand	MCC Hall The Mall Lifestore
September 13, 2025	Kaohsiung	Taiwan	Kaohsiung Music Center

Set list
1. “Twit”
2. “I Love My Body”
3. “Somebody!"
4. “Snooze” (SZA cover)
5. “Lemon”
6. “Don't”
7. “Walk On By” (Dionne Warwick cover)
8. “I'm a B”
9. “LMM”
10. “Intro: Nobody else”
11. “María”
12. “Décalcomanie” / ”Egotistic” / ”Starry Night” / ”Dingga” / ”Hip” (Mamamoo medley)

Encore (Note: Multiple unplanned encores were performed)

1. “Chili”
2. “I Love My Body” (Acoustic version)

== Concerts ==
Title	Date	City	Country	Venue/Network	Ref.
Mi Casa	January 17–18, 2026	Seoul	South Korea	Kyung Hee University Grand Peace Hall	

== Showcases ==
Title	Date	City	Country	Venue/Network	Ref.
Guilty Pleasure Comeback Showcase	November 24, 2021	Seoul	South Korea	Yes24 Live Hall	

== Joint concerts and guest appearances ==
Title	Date	City	Country	Venue/Network	Ref.
Waterbomb Seoul	June 24, 2022	Seoul	South Korea	Seoul Sports Complex	
HallyuPopFest London	July 9, 2022	London	England	Wembley Arena	
PSY Summer Swag 2022	August 20, 2022	Busan	South Korea	Busan Asiad Auxiliary Stadium	
MIK Festival Paris	February 18, 2023	Paris	France	Accor Arena	
2023 Jinhae Military Music Festival (Note: Performed as a part of Dancing Queens on the Road)	April 2, 2023	Jinhae	South Korea	Jinhae Public Stadium	
Dancing Queens on the Road in Gwangyang	April 16, 2023	Gwangyang	South Korea	Baegun Art Hall	
Dancing Queens on the Road in Gwangju	May 5, 2023	Gwangju	South Korea	Kim Daejung Convention Center	
Dancing Queens on the Road in Pyeongchang	June 25, 2023	Pyeongchang	South Korea	Pyeongchang Alpensia Resort Music Tent	
PSY Summer Swag 2023	June 30, 2023	Seoul	South Korea	Jamsil Olympic Stadium	
Dancing Queens on the Road in Seoul	July 9, 2023	Seoul	South Korea	Korea University Hwajeong Gymnasium	
PSY Summer Swag 2023	July 15, 2023	Yeosu	South Korea	Jinnam Sports Complex	
PSY Summer Swag 2023	July 22, 2023	Suwon	South Korea	Suwon World Cup Stadium	
PSY Summer Swag 2023	August 19, 2023	Daegu	South Korea	Daegu Stadium	
Korea Spotlight	November 10, 2023	Dubai	UAE	Coca-Cola Arena	
Kim Wan-san "MUSIC" Concert in Seoul	November 18, 2023	Seoul	South Korea	Jangchung Gymnasium	
Uhm Jung-hwa "Invitation" Concert in Seoul	December 9, 2023	Seoul	South Korea	Jamsil Students' Gymnasium	
MusicBank Global Festival 2023	December 15, 2023	Seoul	South Korea	Yeouido KBS Hall	
2024 Taipei New Year's Party	December 31, 2023	Taipei	Taiwan	Taipei City Hall Square	
Sharing and Together Concert	January 12, 2024	Seoul	South Korea	SK Handball Stadium	
Wanderland Music and Arts Festival	March 10, 2024	Muntinlupa	Philippines	Filinvest City Events Grounds	
7-Eleven 2024 Sakura Festival in Kaohsiung	March 22, 2024	Kaohsiung	Taiwan	Dream Mall	
Chungju Dive Festival 2024	June 1, 2024	Chungju	South Korea	Chungju Sports Complex	
K-culture Festival in Turkey	June 29, 2024	Nevşehir	Turkey	Ürgüp Festival Alanı	
Waterbomb Seoul 2024	July 5, 2024	Goyang	South Korea	KINTEX	
PSY Summer Swag 2024	July 7, 2024	Gwangju	South Korea	Gwangju World Cup Stadium	
K-Mega Concert in Kaohsiung	July 13, 2024	Kaohsiung	Taiwan	Kaohsiung Arena	
PSY Summer Swag 2024	July 27, 2024	Daejeon	South Korea	Mokwon University	
PSY Summer Swag 2024	July 28, 2024	Daejeon	South Korea	Mokwon University	
Daejeon 0 o'clock Festival	August 10, 2024	Daejeon	South Korea	Jungang-ro Street	
Heroes in Paris	August 16, 2024	Seoul	South Korea	Yeouido Park	
Waterbomb Suwon 2024	August 24, 2024	Suwon	South Korea	Suwon University	
Golden Wave in Tokyo	October 12, 2024	Tokyo	Japan	Musashino Forest Sport Plaza	
IAM Worldwide HIS7ORY 7th Anniversary Music Festival	October 20, 2024	Manila	Philippines	SM Mall of Asia Arena	
GenFest 2024	November 23, 2024	Ho Chi Minh City	Vietnam	The Global City	
Rosedust Concert	February 15, 2025	Ulaanbaatar	Mongolia	AIC Steppe Arena	
Waterbomb Manila	February 22, 2025	Manila	Philippines	Quirino Grandstand	
Skechers Sundown Festival	July 6, 2025	Singapore		Haw Par Villa	
PSY Summer Swag 2025	July 26, 2025	Sokcho	South Korea	Sokcho Stadium	
KCON LA 2025	August 2–3, 2025	Los Angeles	United States	Crypto.com Arena	
PSY Summer Swag 2025	August 15, 2025	Busan	South Korea	Busan Asiad Auxiliary Stadium	
CassCool Festival	August 23, 2025	Gwacheon	South Korea	Seoul Land	
Rakuten Monkeys- Singdome Music Radio	September 14, 2025	Taipei	Taiwan	Taipei Arena	
Hyundai Card DaVinci Motel	September 21, 2025	Seoul	South Korea	Itaewon Hyundai Card Area	
Ansan Festa Super Concert	September 28, 2025	Ansan	South Korea	Ansan Wa~ Stadium	
Korean Brand and Entertainment Expo New York	November 8, 2025	East Rutherford	United States	American Dream Mall	
Waterbomb Ho Chi Minh	November 16, 2025	Ho Chi Minh City	Vietnam	Van Phuc City	
Crush Hour	December 20, 2025	Seoul	South Korea	Jamsil Indoor Stadium	
Naver X Spotify Party	December 22, 2025	Seoul	South Korea	XYZ Seoul	
2025 Sung Si-kyung Year-End Concert	December 27, 2025	Seoul	South Korea	KSPO Dome	
2025 Sung Si-kyung Year-End Concert	December 28, 2025	Seoul	South Korea	KSPO Dome	
2026 Davichi concert "Time Capsule: Continuing Time"	January 25, 2026	Seoul	South Korea	KSPO Dome	
Shining New Taipei 1314 Cross-River Fireworks	December 31, 2025	New Taipei City	Taiwan	Tamsui Fisherman's Wharf	
K-Spark in Malaysia	January 31, 2026	Kuala Lumpur	Malaysia	Stadium Merdeka	
M+ Party	March 23, 2026	Hong Kong		M+ museum	
FWD Champions Day	April 26, 2026	Hong Kong		Sha Tin Racecourse	
Seoul Spring Festival– Wonder Show	May 3, 2026	Seoul	South Korea	Yeouido Park	

=== University festivals ===
Title	Date	City	Country	Venue
Gachon Blue Day University Festival	May 8, 2024	Seongnam	South Korea	Gachon University
Yong In University Blue Dragon Festival	May 8, 2024	Yongin	South Korea	Yong In University
2024 Seokyeong University Daedong Festival "For:rest"	May 9, 2024	Seoul	South Korea	Seokyeong University
Pohang University Festival	May 23, 2024	Pohang	South Korea	Pohang University of Science and Technology
Inje University Festival	May 28, 2024	Gimhae	South Korea	Inje University
Busan University of Foreign Studies Festival	May 29, 2024	Busan	South Korea	Busan University of Foreign Studies
Andong Science College Festival	May 30, 2024	Andong	South Korea	Andong Science College
Hanbat National University Festival	May 31, 2024	Daejeon	South Korea	Hanbat National University
ChungAng University Festival	September 25, 2024	Anseong	South Korea	Chung-Ang University Da Vinci Campus
Semyung University- Blue Dragon Festival	May 14, 2025	Jecheon	South Korea	Semyung University
Hyupsung University Festival	May 21, 2025	Hwaseong	South Korea	Hyupsung University
Maverick Festival	May 26, 2025	Busan	South Korea	Dong-Eui University

== Award shows ==
Title	Date	Location	Performed song(s)	Ref.
2018 Mnet Asian Music Awards	December 12, 2018	Saitama, Japan	"Don't"	
33rd Golden Disc Awards	January 5, 2019	Seoul, South Korea	"HandClap" + "Don't"	
2019 Soribada Best K-Music Awards	August 22, 2019	Seoul, South Korea	"Twit"	
2019 Melon Music Awards	November 30, 2019	Seoul, South Korea	"Twit"	
2019 Mnet Asian Music Awards	December 4, 2019	Nagoya, Japan	"New Rules"; "Twit" + "Don't Leave Me" (with JYP)	
2019 MBC Entertainment Awards	December 29, 2019	Seoul, South Korea	"Twit"	
34th Golden Disc Awards	January 4, 2020	Seoul, South Korea	"LOVE." + "Twit"	
9th Gaon Chart Music Awards	January 8, 2020	Seoul, South Korea	"Twit"	
2020 Mnet Asian Music Awards	December 6, 2020	Paju, South Korea	Intro + "Maria"; "Gang" (with Jessi)	
2020 The Fact Music Awards	December 12, 2020	Seoul, South Korea	"Maria" (Ballad ver.)	
35th Golden Disc Awards	January 9, 2021	Seoul, South Korea	"Maria"	
2nd Blue Dragon Series Awards	July 19, 2023	Incheon, South Korea	"Twit" + "Maria"	
2023 SBS Drama Awards	December 29, 2023	Seoul, South Korea	"LMM"	
13th Circle Chart Music Awards	January 10, 2024	Busan, South Korea	"I Love My Body" + "Chili"	
46th Blue Dragon Film Awards	November 19, 2025	Seoul, South Korea	"Good Goodbye" (with Park Jeong-min)	
