= Hwasa discography =

Singer discography

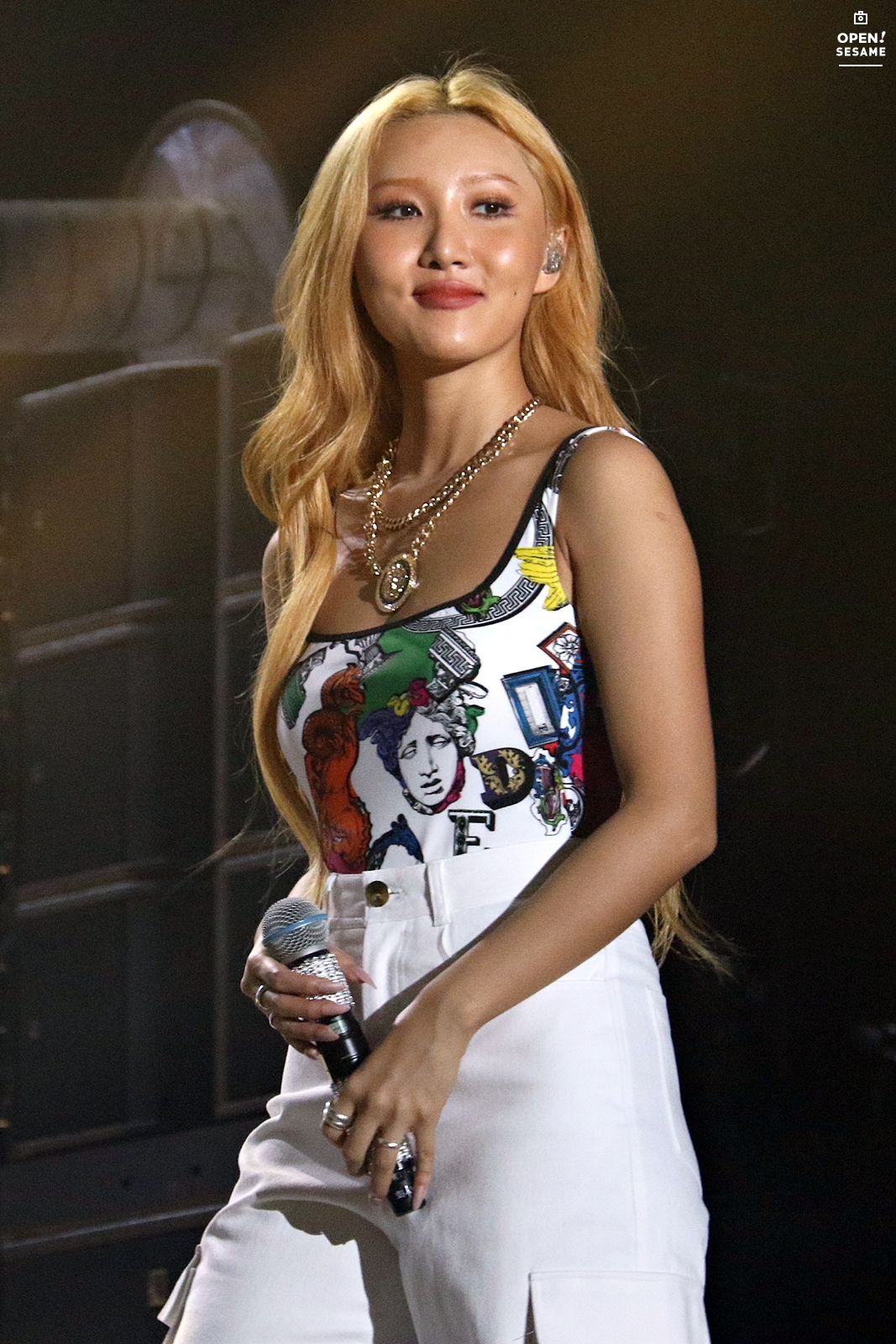
- Hwasa performing in 2019
- EPs: 2
- Soundtrack albums: 1
- Singles: 25
- Promotional singles: 4
- Single albums: 1

South Korean singer Hwasa has released two extended plays, one single album, twenty-six singles (including 16 as a featured artist), four promotional singles and one soundtrack.

== Extended plays ==
List of EPs, with selected chart positions and sales figures
Title	Details	Peak chart positions		Sales
Title	Details	KOR	US World	Sales
María	Released: June 29, 2020; Label: RBW; Formats: CD, digital download, streaming	5	7	KOR: 66,121
O	Released: September 19, 2024; Label: P Nation, Warner Music Korea; Formats: CD, digital download, streaming	13	—	KOR: 17,314
"—" denotes a recording that did not chart or was not released in that territory.

== Single albums ==
Title	Details	Peak chart positions	Sales
Title	Details	KOR	Sales
Guilty Pleasure	Released: November 24, 2021; Label: RBW; Formats: CD, digital download, streaming	6	KOR: 37,308

== Singles ==
=== As lead artist ===
List of singles as lead artist, showing year released, with selected chart positions, sales, certifications and album name
Title	Year	Peak chart positions										Sales	Certifications	Album
Title	Year	KOR	KOR Bill.	HK	JPN Hot	MYS	NZ Hot	SGP	TWN	US World	WW	Sales	Certifications	Album
"Love Comes" (Original and English version) (with Esna)	2017	—	—	—	—	—	—	—	—	—	—	—N/a	—N/a	Non-album single
"Don't" (with Loco)	2018	1	1	—	—	—	—	—	—	—	—	KOR: 2,500,000	KMCA: Platinum (str.); KMCA: Platinum (dig.)	Hyena on the Keyboard, Pt. 4
"Twit" (멍청이)	2019	1	1	—	—	—	22	—	—	3	—	—N/a	—N/a	María
"In the Fall" (가을속에서) (with Woogie)	2019	91	—	—	—	—	—	—	—	—	—	—N/a	—N/a	Hwa:telier
"María" (마리아)	2020	2	2	—	79	8	—	5	—	6	—	—N/a	KMCA: Platinum (str.)	María
"I Can't Make You Love Me" (with Kinda Blue)	2021	— (Note: "I Can't Make You Love Me" did not enter Gaon Digital Chart, but peaked at number 72 on the component Gaon Download Chart.)	—	—	—	—	—	—	—	—	—	—N/a	—N/a	Non-album single
"I'm a B" (I'm a 빛)	2021	94	61	—	—	—	—	— (Note: "I'm a B" did not enter the RIAS Top International Streaming chart, but it peaked at number 18 on the Top Regional Chart.)	—	7	—	—N/a	—N/a	Guilty Pleasure
"Somebody!" (with Loco)	2022	51	22	—	—	—	—	—	—	—	—	—N/a	—N/a	Somebody
"I Love My Body"	2023	9	14	—	—	—	—	—	—	8	—	—N/a	—N/a	Non-album singles
"Na"	2024	97	—	—	—	—	—	—	—	—	—	—N/a	—N/a	O
"Star"	2024	— (Note: "Star" did not enter the Circle Digital Chart, but it peaked at number 56 on the component Circle Download Chart.)	—	—	—	—	—	—	—	—	—	—N/a	—N/a	Non-album singles
"Good Goodbye"	2025	1	1	4	— (Note: "Good Goodbye" did not enter the Billboard Japan Hot 100, but it peaked at number 65 on the Japan Download Songs.)	7	26	4	1	1	32	—N/a	—N/a	Non-album singles
"So Cute"	2026	97	—	—	—	—	—	—	—	—	—	—N/a	—N/a	Non-album singles
"—" denotes a recording that did not chart or was not released in that territory.

=== As featured artist ===
List of singles as featured artist, showing year released, with selected chart positions, sales and album name
Title	Year	Peak chart positions			Sales	Album
Title	Year	KOR	KOR Hot	US World	Sales	Album
"Break Up for You, Not Yet for Me" (넌 이별 난 아직) (Standing Egg featuring Park Shin-hye and Hwasa) (Note: Credited as Maria)	2013	34	—	—	KOR: 95,026	Non-album singles
"Boy Jump" (소년점프) (Baechigi featuring Hwasa)	2014	80	—	—	KOR: 50,181	Non-album singles
"Drinks Up" (Ja Mezz featuring Hwasa)	2015	—	—	—	—N/a	Hangover and 1/4
"Call Me" (연락해) (Basick and Lil Boi featuring Hwasa)	2015	26	—	—	KOR: 105,060	Basick X Lil Boi
"Love Talk" (Kisum featuring Hwasa)	2015	43	—	—	KOR: 81,336	Non-album singles
"Ddang" (땡땡땡) (Suran featuring Hwasa)	2016	—	—	—	—N/a	Non-album singles
"Nice" (Basick featuring G2 and Hwasa)	2016	100	—	—	KOR: 18,274	Nice
"HookGA" (High4:20 featuring Hwasa)	2016	—	—	—	—N/a	Hook가 HookGA
"I Am Me" (San E featuring Hwasa)	2017	61	—	—	KOR: 28,700	Season of Suffering
"Cotton Candy" (Woodie Gochild featuring Hwasa)	2018	—	—	—	—N/a	#Gochild
"Physical" (Dua Lipa featuring Hwasa)	2020	124	—	—	—N/a	Physical (Remixes)
"Q" (모르겠다고) (Onewe featuring Hwasa)	2020	—	—	12	—N/a	3/4 and One
"Hop In" (호피무늬) (Uhm Jung Hwa featuring Hwasa and DPR Live)	2020	— (Note: "Hop in" did not enter Gaon Digital Chart, but peaked at number 59 on the component Gaon Download Chart.)	—	—	—N/a	Non-album single
"Hula Hoops" (DPR Live featuring Beenzino and Hwasa)	2021	185	—	21	—N/a	Iite Cool
"Catch" (Epik High featuring Hwasa)	2023	124	—	—	—N/a	Strawberry
"Love Is Ugly" (Jay Park featuring Hwasa)	2023	156	—	—	—N/a	Yesterday and The One You Wanted
"—" denotes a recording that did not chart or was not released in that territory.

=== Promotional singles ===
List of promotional singles, showing year released, with selected chart positions and album name
Title	Year	Peak chart positions			Album
Title	Year	KOR	NZ Hot	US World	Album
"Play with Life" (Note: "Play with Life" was released as a promotional single in collaboration with Sims 4.)	2021	117	—	—	Non-album promotional single
"Just Talking to Myself" (화사한 밤)	2022	—	—	—	Hwa Sa Show, Vol. 1
"Grey Christmas"	2022	—	—	—	Hwa Sa Show, Vol. 2
"Chili" (Note: "Chili" was released as a standalone promotional single for Street Woman Fighter 2.)	2023	34	27	—	Non-album promotional single
"—" denotes a recording that did not chart or was not released in that territory.

== Soundtrack appearances ==
List of soundtrack appearances, showing year released, selected chart positions and album name
Title	Year	Peak chart positions		Album
Title	Year	KOR	US World	Album
"Orbit"	2020	— (Note: "Orbit" did not enter the Gaon Digital Chart, but it peaked at number 48 on the component Download Chart.)	16	The King: Eternal Monarch OST
"Fool For You"	2026	—	—	Project Y OST
"—" denotes a recording that did not chart or was not released in that territory.

== Other charted songs ==
List of other charted songs, showing year released, with selected chart positions, sales and album name
Title	Year	Peak chart positions	Sales	Album
Title	Year	KOR	Sales	Album
"Mileage" (Primary featuring Paloalto and Hwasa)	2015	45	KOR: 114,263	2-3 and 2
"Dab Dab" (with Moonbyul)	2016	69	KOR: 31,040	Memory
"Be Calm" (덤덤해지네)	2018	— (Note: "Be Calm" did not enter the Gaon Digital Chart, but it peaked at number 35 on the component Download Chart.)	—N/a	Yellow Flower
"Intro: Nobody Else"	2020	— (Note: "Intro: Nobody Else" did not enter the Gaon Digital Chart, but it peaked at number 159 on the component Download Chart.)	—N/a	María
"Kidding"	2020	— (Note: "Kidding" did not enter the Gaon Digital Chart, but it peaked at number 91 on the component Download Chart.)	—N/a	María
"Why"	2020	— (Note: "Why" did not enter the Gaon Digital Chart, but it peaked at number 93 on the component Download Chart.)	—N/a	María
"I'm Bad Too" (featuring DPR Live)	2020	— (Note: "I'm Bad Too" did not enter the Gaon Digital Chart, but it peaked at number 54 on the component Download Chart.)	—N/a	María
"LMM"	2020	— (Note: "LMM" did not enter the Gaon Digital Chart, but it peaked at number 88 on the component Download Chart.)	—N/a	María
"FOMO"	2021	— (Note: FOMO did not enter the Gaon Digital Chart, but it peaked at number 83 on the component Download Chart.)	—N/a	Guilty Pleasure
"Bless U"	2021	— (Note: "Bless U" did not enter the Gaon Digital Chart, but it peaked at number 65 on the component Download Chart.)	—N/a	Guilty Pleasure
"Nothing" (Be'O featuring Hwasa and Mino)	2021	73	—N/a	Show Me the Money 10 Final
"Now" (Psy featuring Hwasa)	2022	103	—N/a	Psy 9th
"Road"	2024	— (Note: "Road" did not enter the Circle Digital Chart, but it peaked at number 61 on the component Circle Download Chart.)	—N/a	O
"Hwasa"	2024	— (Note: "Hwasa" did not enter the Circle Digital Chart, but it peaked at number 48 on the component Circle Download Chart.)	—N/a	O
"Ego"	2024	— (Note: "Ego" did not enter the Circle Digital Chart, but it peaked at number 51 on the component Circle Download Chart.)	—N/a	O
"OK Next"	2024	— (Note: "OK Next" did not enter the Circle Digital Chart, but it peaked at number 66 on the component Circle Download Chart.)	—N/a	O
"Just Want to Have Some Fun"	2024	— (Note: "Just Want to Have Some Fun" did not enter the Circle Digital Chart, but it peaked at number 65 on the component Circle Download Chart.)	—N/a	O
"O"	2024	— (Note: "O" did not enter the Circle Digital Chart, but it peaked at number 56 on the component Circle Download Chart.)	—N/a	O
"—" denotes a recording that did not chart or was not released in that territory.

== Guest appearances ==
List of other appearances, showing year released, other artist(s) credited and album name
Title	Year	Other artist(s)	Album
"Ottogi (Club House Version)" (Note: Hwasa is credited as Hye Jin Ahn)	2012	Solbi	SolBi is an Ottogi
"Biting My Nails" (손톱) (Note: Hwasa is credited as HJ)	2013	Phantom	Phantom Theory
"I Do Me"	2014	—N/a	Hello
"There Is No One (Follow Me, Aerobics Girl)" 누구 없소 (날 따라해봐요 에어로빅소녀)	2017	—N/a	Mask Singer 112th (Live Version)
"Treat Me Bad"	2018	K.Will	The 4th Album, Pt. 2 'Mood Indigo
"When You Come to My Heart"	2019	—N/a	[Vol.8] You Hee yul's Sketchbook 10th Anniversary Project: 4th Voice 'Sketchbook X Hwa Sa'
"You Are Crying"	2019	—N/a	[Vol.9] You Hee yul's Sketchbook 10th Anniversary Project: 4th Voice 'Sketchbook X Hwa Sa'
"Fairy of Shampoo"	2019	—N/a	[Vol.10] You Hee yul's Sketchbook 10th Anniversary Project: 4th Voice 'Sketchbook X Hwa Sa'
"Two Girl Love a Man"	2019	Wheein and Kim Hyunchul	Fe's 10th: Preview and Kim Hyun Chul 10th "Sail"
"Lemon"	2022	Loco	Somebody
"17"	2023	Wheein	In the Mood

== Music videos ==
List of music videos, showing year released and director(s)
Title	Year	Other artist(s)	Director(s)	Ref.
As lead artist
"Dab Dab"	2016	Moonbyul	Unknown	
"Be Calm" (덤덤해지네)	2018	None	Park Woo Sang (LOGOS)	
"Don't" (주지마)	2018	Loco	Seil Sung (AOMG)	
"Twit" (멍청이)	2019	None	Hong Won-ki, Shim Jihyung (Zanybros)	
"In the Fall" (가을속에서) (Piano Version)	2019	Woogie	Unknown	
"Orbit"	2020	None	Unknown	
"Maria" (마리아)	2020	None	Paranoid Paradigm (VM Project Architecture)	
"LMM"	2020	None	HOBIN, Lee Seokjun (a HOBIN film)	
"Play with Life"	2021	None	Unknown	
"I Can't Make You Love Me" (Kinda Blue Version)	2021	Kinda Blue	a HOBIN film	
"I'm a B" (I'm a 빛)	2021	None	Paranoid Paradigm (VM Project Architecture)	
"FOMO" (Visual Video)	2021	None	Park Woo Sang (LOGOS)	
"Somebody!"	2022	Loco	Kang Mingi (aarch film)	
"Just Talking to Myself" (화사한 밤)	2022	None	Unknown	
"Grey Christmas" (Real Live Clip)	2022	None	Unknown	
"I Love My Body"	2023	None	MOTHER MEDIA	
"Chili"	2023	Street Woman Fighter 2	Minjun Lee, Hayoung Lee (MOSWANTD)	
"Na"	2024	None	Yeom Woo-jin; S(V)C	
"Star"	2024	None	Park Woo Sang (LOGOS)	
As featured artist
"Boy Jump" (소년점프)	2014	Baechigi	Unknown	
"Drinks Up"	2015	Ja Mezz	Unknown	
"Call Me" (연락해)	2015	Basick and Lil Boi	Unknown	
"Love Talk"	2015	Kisum	Unknown	
"Nice"	2016	Basick featuring G2	Unknown	
"HookGA"	2016	High4:20	Unknown	
"I Am Me"	2017	San E	Unknown	
"Cotton Candy"	2018	Woodie Gochild	ILLUMINCREATE	
"Q" (모르겠다고)	2020	Onewe	Hong Won-ki, Shim Jihyung (Zanybros)	
"Hop In" (호피무늬)	2020	Uhm Jung Hwa featuring DPR Live	Hwang Sang June	
"Hula Hoops"	2021	DPR Live featuring Beenzino	DPR Production	
"Love Is Ugly" (Live Clip)	2023	Jay Park	Unknown	
"Catch"	2023	Epik High	Taerim Moon	

== Songwriting credits ==
All song credits are adapted from the Korea Music Copyright Association's database unless stated otherwise.

Year	Artist	Song	Album	Lyrics	Music
2014	Mamamoo and Geeks	"Heeheehaheho" (히히하헤호)	Hello	Yes	No
2014	Mamamoo	"I Do Me" (내맘이야) (Note: Song was released under Mamamoo, but is a solo track performed by Hwasa)	Hello	Yes	Yes
2015	Mamamoo	"Freakin Shoes"	Pink Funky	Yes	Yes
2015	Mamamoo	"Um Oh Ah Yeh" (음오아예)	Pink Funky	Yes	No
2015	Mamamoo	"Um Oh Ah Yeh" (Acapella version)	Pink Funky	Yes	No
2016	Mamamoo	"Taller Than You" (1cm의 자존심)	Melting	Yes	No
2016	Mamamoo	"My Hometown" (고향이)	Melting	Yes	No
2016	Mamamoo	"Recipe" (나만의)	Melting	Yes	Yes
2016	High4:20 featuring Hwasa	"HookGA" (나만의)	HookGA	Yes	No
2016	Mamamoo	"Décalcomanie" (데칼코마니)	Memory	Yes	No
2016	Mamamoo	"I Love Too" (놓지 않을게)	Memory	Yes	No
2017	Mamamoo	"Yes I Am" (나로 말할 것 같으면)	Purple	Yes	No
2017	Mamamoo	"Aze Gag" (아재개그)	Purple	Yes	Yes
2018	SSS	"Dangerous Girl"	Non-album single	Yes	No
2018	Mamamoo	"Be Calm" (덤덤해지네) (Note: Song was released under Mamamoo, but is a solo track performed by Hwasa)	Yellow Flower	Yes	Yes
2018	Loco and Hwasa	"Don't" (주지마)	Hyena on the Keyboard, Pt. 4	Yes	Yes
2018	Mamamoo	"Sleep in the Car" (잠이라도 자지)	Red Moon	Yes	No
2018	Woodie Gochild featuring Hwasa	"Cotton Candy" (솜사탕)	#Gochild	Yes	Yes
2019	Hwasa	"Twit" (멍청이)	María	Yes	Yes
2019	Hwasa and Woogie	"In the Fall" (가을속에서)	Hwa:telier	Yes	Yes
2019	Mamamoo	"Hip"	Reality in Black	Yes	Yes
2020	Hwasa	"María" (마리아)	María	Yes	Yes
2020	Hwasa	"Why"	María	Yes	No
2020	Hwasa prod. by Zico	"Kidding"	María	No	Yes
2020	Hwasa	"LMM"	María	Yes	Yes
2020	Mamamoo	"Dingga" (딩가딩가)	Travel	No	Yes
2021	Park Hyeon-jin featuring Meenoi	"Paradise"	Non-album single	No	Yes
2021	DPR Live featuring Beenzino and Hwasa	"Hula Hoops"	Iite Cool	Yes	No
2021	Hwasa and Kinda Blue	"I can't make you love me"	Non-album single	Yes	No
2021	Mamamoo	"Decalcomanie 2021"	I Say Mamamoo: The Best	Yes	No
2021	Mamamoo	"Yes I am (Funk boost ver.)" (나로 말할 것 같으면)	I Say Mamamoo: The Best	Yes	No
2021	Mamamoo	"Um Oh Ah Yeh 2021" (음오아예 2021)	I Say Mamamoo: The Best	Yes	No
2021	Mamamoo	"HIP (Remix ver.)"	I Say Mamamoo: The Best	Yes	Yes
2021	Mamamoo	"HeeHeeHaHeHo Part.2" (히히하헤호 Part.2)	I Say Mamamoo: The Best	Yes	No
2021	Hwasa	"I'm a B" (I'm a 빛)	Guilty Pleasure	Yes	No
2021	Hwasa	"Bless U"	Guilty Pleasure	Yes	Yes
2022	Mamamoo	"Decalcomanie" (Japanese ver.)	I Say Mamamoo: The Best (Japan Edition)	Yes	No
2022	Mamamoo	"Dingga" (Japanese ver.)	I Say Mamamoo: The Best (Japan Edition)	No	Yes
2022	Mamamoo	"HIP" (Japanese ver.)	I Say Mamamoo: The Best (Japan Edition)	Yes	Yes
2022	Loco and Hwasa	"Somebody!"	Somebody	Yes	Yes
2022	Loco and Hwasa	"Lemon"	Somebody	Yes	Yes
2022	Hwasa	"Just Talking to Myself" (화사한 밤)	Hwa Sa Show, Vol. 1	Yes	Yes
2022	Hwasa	"Grey Christmas"	Hwa Sa Show, Vol. 2	Yes	Yes
2023	Jay Park featuring Hwasa	"Love Is Ugly"	Yesterday	Yes	Yes
2023	Mamamoo+	"DangDang" (댕댕)	Two Rabbits	Yes	Yes
2023	Hwasa	"Chili"	Non-album promotional single	Yes	Yes
2024	Hwasa	"Road"	O	No	Yes
2024	Hwasa	"OK NEXT"	O	Yes	Yes
2024	Hwasa	"O"	O	Yes	Yes
2024	Hwasa	"just want to have some fun"	O	Yes	No
2025	Hwasa	"Hanhae's Kiss The Radio Logo Song (화사)" (한해의 키스 더 라디오 로고송 (화사))	Non-album single	Yes	Yes
2025	Hwasa	"Good Goodbye"	Non-album single	Yes	Yes
2025	Hwasa with Duomo	"Good Goodbye"	Non-album single	—N/a	Yes
2026	Hwasa	"So Cute"	Non-album single	Yes	Yes
