= List of awards and nominations received by Hwasa =

Hwasa awards and nominations
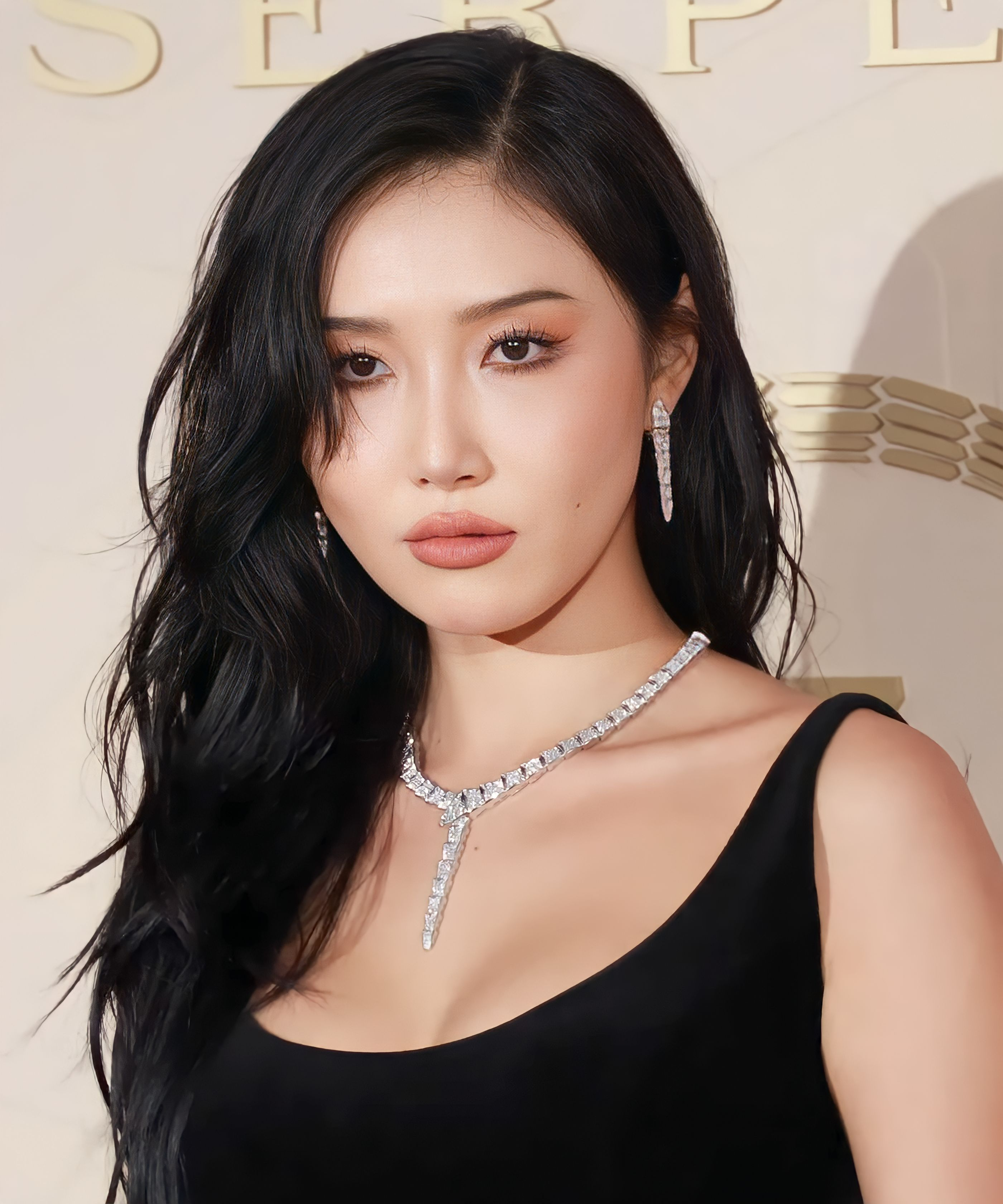
- Hwasa in 2023
Awards and nominations
Award	Wins	Nominations
APAN Music Awards	1	2
Asia Artist Awards	0	1
Asian Pop Music Awards	1	3
Gaon Chart Music Awards	1	2
Genie Music Awards	0	1
Golden Disc Awards	2	3
Hanteo Music Awards	0	1
KBS Entertainment Awards	1	1
Korea Broadcasting Awards	1	1
Korea First Brand Awards	4	5
Korean Music Awards	1	1
KKBox Music Awards	1	1
KM Chart Awards	2	2
MAMA Awards	1	3
MBC Entertainment Awards	5	6
Melon Music Awards	1	9
Mnet Asian Music Awards	1	8
Seoul Music Awards	0	7
Soribada Best K-Music Awards	1	1
K-World Dream Awards	1	1
QQ Music Boom Boom Awards	1	1
The Fact Music Awards	1	1

Totals (Note: Certain award groups do not simply award one winner. They acknowledge several different recipients, have runners-up, and have third place. Since this is a specific recognition and is different from losing an award, runner-up mentions are considered wins in this award tally. For simplification and to avoid errors, each award in this list has been presumed to have had a prior nomination.)
- Wins: 28
- Nominations: 69

Hwasa is a South Korean singer-songwriter. She debuted as a member of Mamamoo in 2014. In February 2019, she made her debut as a solo artist with the digital single "Twit".

== Awards and nominations ==
Name of the award ceremony, year presented, category, nominee of the award, and the result of the nomination
Award ceremony	Year	Category	Nominee(s) / Work(s)	Result	Ref.
APAN Music Awards	2020	Idol Champ Global Pick – Solo	Hwasa	Won	
APAN Music Awards	2020	Best Icon Award	Hwasa	Nominated	
Asia Artist Awards	2026	Popularity Award – Solo (Female)	Hwasa	Pending	
Asian Pop Music Awards	2020	Song of the Year (Overseas)	"María"	Won	
Asian Pop Music Awards	2020	Best Composer	Hwasa	Nominated	
Asian Pop Music Awards	2020	Best Female Solo	Hwasa	Nominated	
BreakTudo Awards	2020	International New/Breakthrough Artist	Hwasa	Won	
Circle Chart Music Awards	2019	Artist of the Year – Digital Music (February)	"Twit"	Won	
Circle Chart Music Awards	2020	Artist of the Year – Digital Music (June)	"María"	Nominated	
Circle Chart Music Awards	2023	New Icon of the Year	"I Love My Body"	Won	
The Fact Music Awards	2020	Artist of the Year (Bonsang)	Hwasa	Won	
Genie Music Awards	2019	The Female Solo Artist	Hwasa	Nominated	
Golden Disc Awards	2019	Best Solo Artist Award	Hwasa	Won	
Golden Disc Awards	2019	Best Digital Song (Bonsang)	"Twit"	Nominated	
Golden Disc Awards	2020	Best Digital Song (Bonsang)	"María"	Won	
Hanteo Music Awards	2021	Artist Award — Female Solo	Hwasa	Nominated	
KBS Entertainment Awards	2018	Hot Issue Entertainer Award	Hyena on the Keyboard (alongside Loco)	Won	
KKBox Music Awards	2026	Top 100 Artists of the Year	Hwasa	Won	
KM Chart Awards	2026	Song Of The Year (Daesang)	"Good Goodbye"	Won	
KM Chart Awards	2026	Ultimate 12 (Bonsang)	Hwasa	Won	
Korea Broadcasting Awards (Note: The Korea Broadcasting Awards (est. 1973) are prestigious annual honors presented by the Korean Broadcasters Association to recognize excellence and social impact across South Korea's major national networks (KBS, MBC, SBS, and EBS).)	2021	Best Female Reality Star	I Live Alone	Won	
Korea First Brand Awards (Note: Hosted by the Korea Consumer Brand Committee and the Korea Consumer Forum, the Korea First Brand Awards bases its winners on a nationwide South Korean survey)	2020	Female Idol Variety Star	Hwasa	Won	
Korea First Brand Awards	2020	Female Solo Artist	Hwasa	Won	
Korea First Brand Awards	2021	Female Idol Variety Star	Hwasa	Won	
Korea First Brand Awards	2021	Female Solo Artist	Hwasa	Won	
Korea First Brand Awards	2021	Web Entertainment Show	Girl's Secret Party (Note: Alongside Park Na-rae and Han Hye-jin)	Nominated	
Korean Music Awards	2026	Best Pop Song	"Good Goodbye"	Nominated	
MAMA Awards	2024	Best Dance Performance – Female Solo	"Na"	Nominated	
MAMA Awards	2024	Fans' Choice Top 10 – Female	Hwasa	Nominated	
MAMA Awards	2024	Song of the Year	"Na"	Nominated	
MBC Entertainment Awards	2018	Rookie Female of the Year – Variety	I Live Alone	Won	
MBC Entertainment Awards	2019	Female Excellence Award – Variety	I Live Alone	Won	
MBC Entertainment Awards	2020	Digital Content Award	Girl's Secret Party	Won	
MBC Entertainment Awards	2020	Female Top Excellence Award – Variety	I Live Alone & Hangout with Yoo	Won	
MBC Entertainment Awards	2021	PD's Award	I Live Alone (alongside "I Live Alone Team")	Won	
MBC Entertainment Awards	2021	Female Top Excellence Award – Variety	I Live Alone	Nominated	
Melon Music Awards	2018	Hot Trend Award	"Don't" (alongside Loco)	Won	
Melon Music Awards	2018	Best Ballad	"Don't" (alongside Loco)	Nominated	
Melon Music Awards	2018	Top 10 Artist	Hwasa	Nominated	
Melon Music Awards	2019	Song of the Year (Daesang)	"Twit"	Nominated	
Melon Music Awards	2019	Top 10 Artist	Hwasa	Nominated	
Melon Music Awards	2020	Album of the Year (Daesang)	"María"	Nominated	
Melon Music Awards	2020	Best Dance Award (Female)	"María"	Nominated	
Melon Music Awards	2020	Song of the Year (Daesang)	"María"	Nominated	
Melon Music Awards	2020	Top 10 Artist	Hwasa	Nominated	
Mnet Asian Music Awards	2019	Artist of the Year (Daesang)	Hwasa	Nominated	
Mnet Asian Music Awards	2019	Best Dance Performance – Solo	"Twit"	Nominated	
Mnet Asian Music Awards	2019	Best Female Artist	Hwasa	Nominated	
Mnet Asian Music Awards	2019	Song of the Year (Daesang)	"Twit"	Nominated	
Mnet Asian Music Awards	2020	Best Dance Performance – Solo	"María"	Won	
Mnet Asian Music Awards	2020	Artist of the Year (Daesang)	Hwasa	Nominated	
Mnet Asian Music Awards	2020	Best Female Artist	Hwasa	Nominated	
Mnet Asian Music Awards	2020	Song of the Year (Daesang)	"María"	Nominated	
Mnet Asian Music Awards	2022	Best Collaboration	"Somebody! " (with Loco)	Nominated	
Mnet Asian Music Awards	2023	Artist of the Year	Hwasa	Nominated	
Mnet Asian Music Awards	2023	Best Dance Performance Solo	"I Love My Body"	Nominated	
Mnet Asian Music Awards	2023	Best Female Artist	Hwasa	Nominated	
Mnet Asian Music Awards	2023	Song of the Year	"I Love My Body"	Nominated	
QQ Music Boom Boom Awards	2020	Big Shot Artist of the Year	Hwasa	Won	
Seoul Music Awards	2019	Bonsang Award	"Twit"	Nominated	
Seoul Music Awards	2019	Dance Performance Award	"Twit"	Nominated	
Seoul Music Awards	2019	Hallyu Popular Award	Hwasa	Nominated	
Seoul Music Awards	2019	Popularity Award	Hwasa	Nominated	
Seoul Music Awards	2020	Bonsang Award	"María"	Nominated	
Seoul Music Awards	2020	Hallyu Popular Award	Hwasa	Nominated	
Seoul Music Awards	2020	Popularity Award	Hwasa	Nominated	
Soribada Best K-Music Awards	2019	Social Artist Award	Hwasa	Won	
K-World Dream Awards	2026	Best Digital Music Artists	"Good Goodbye"	Won	

== Other accolades ==
=== Listicles ===
Name of publisher, year listed, name of listicle, and placement
Publisher	Year	Listicle	Placement	Ref.
Forbes	2019	Korea Power Celebrity	26th	
