= Refund Sisters =

South Korean pop group

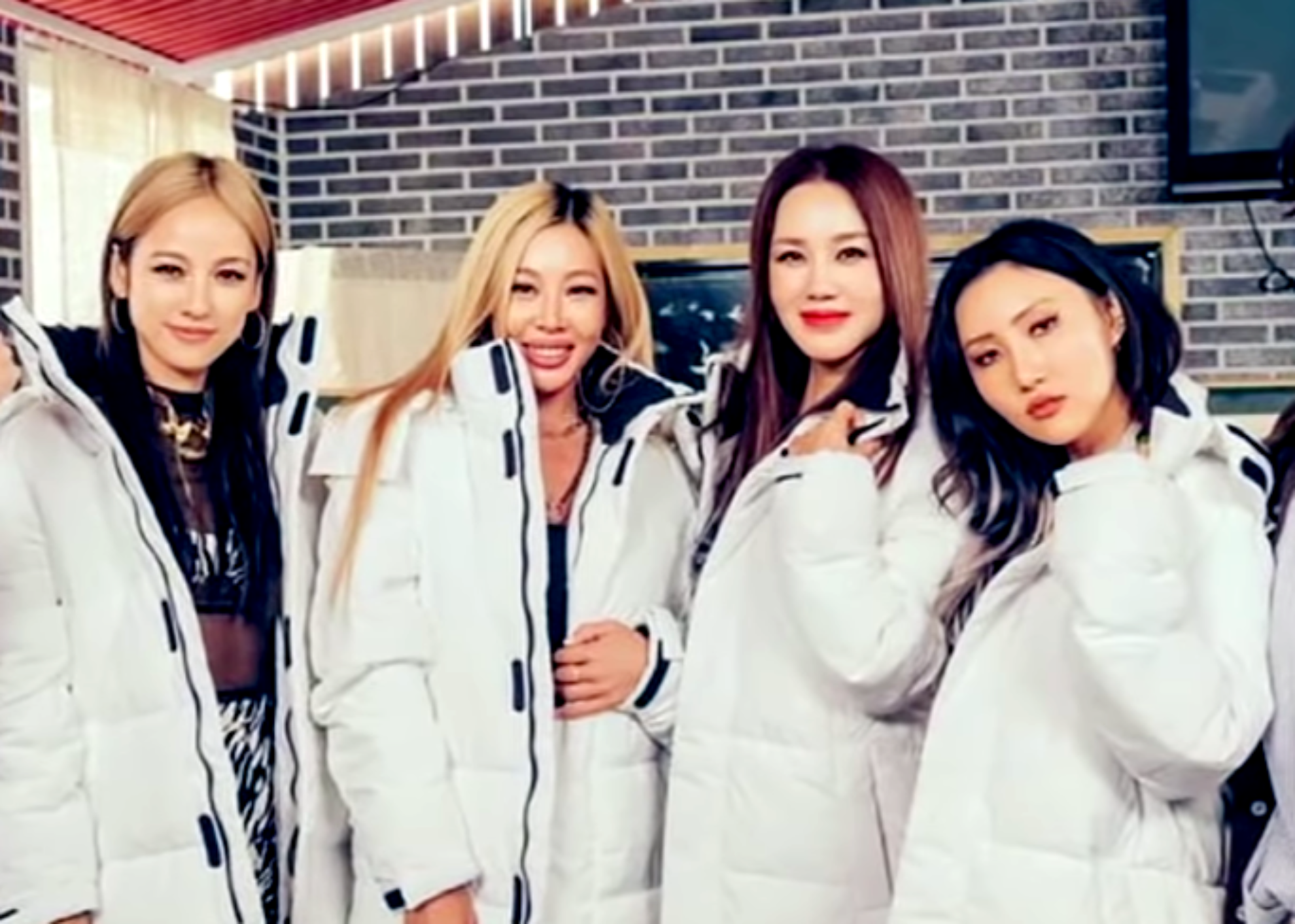
- Refund Sisters in 2020

Background information
- Origin: Seoul, South Korea
- Genres: K-pop
- Years active: 2020
- Label: MBC
- Spinoff of: SSAK3
- Members: Uhm Jung-hwa (Man Ok); Lee Hyori (Chun Ok); Jessi (Eun Bi); Hwasa (Sil Bi)

Refund Sisters (Korean: 환불원정대) is a seasonal South Korean supergroup formed on the MBC variety show Hangout with Yoo. The group is a spin-off of SSAK3 – another group formed on Hangout with Yoo. They made their debut with the single "Don't Touch Me" on October 10, 2020.

== History ==
In June 2020, Lee Hyori joked about forming the ideal girl crush girl group with herself, Jessi, Uhm Jung-hwa, and MAMAMOO’s Hwasa. In a later episode, she shared the idea of having Yoo Jae-suk, the main entertainer on Hangout with Yoo, as the group's manager. After the episode's broadcast, all three mentioned singers responded positively to Hyori's idea and were willing to participate in the project. The concept also received positive support from the public.

In August 2020, the Refund Sisters project was initiated right after the end of the SSAK3 project, bringing the four singers together to form a girl group. Auditions for the group's manager role was carried out, with Kim Jong-min and Jung Jae-hyung chosen for the role. Like the SSAK3 project, all proceeds from Refund Sisters' promotions will be donated to charities.

The group released their debut single "Don't Touch Me" on October 10. The official MV for "Don't Touch Me" was released on October 28.

== Members ==
- Uhm Jung-hwa (Man Ok)
- Lee Hyori (Cheon Ok)
- Jessi (Eun Bi)
- Hwasa (Sil Bi)

=== Producer ===
- Yoo Jae-suk (Jimi Yoo)

=== Managers ===
- Kim Jong-min (Kim Ji-sub)
- Jung Jae-hyung (Jung Bong-won)

== Discography ==
=== Singles ===
List of singles, with selected chart positions, showing year released and album name
Title	Year	Peak chart positions			Album
Title	Year	KOR	KOR Hot	US World	Album
"Don't Touch Me"	2020	1	2	8	Non-album single
