= Hwasa =

South Korean singer and songwriter (born 1995)

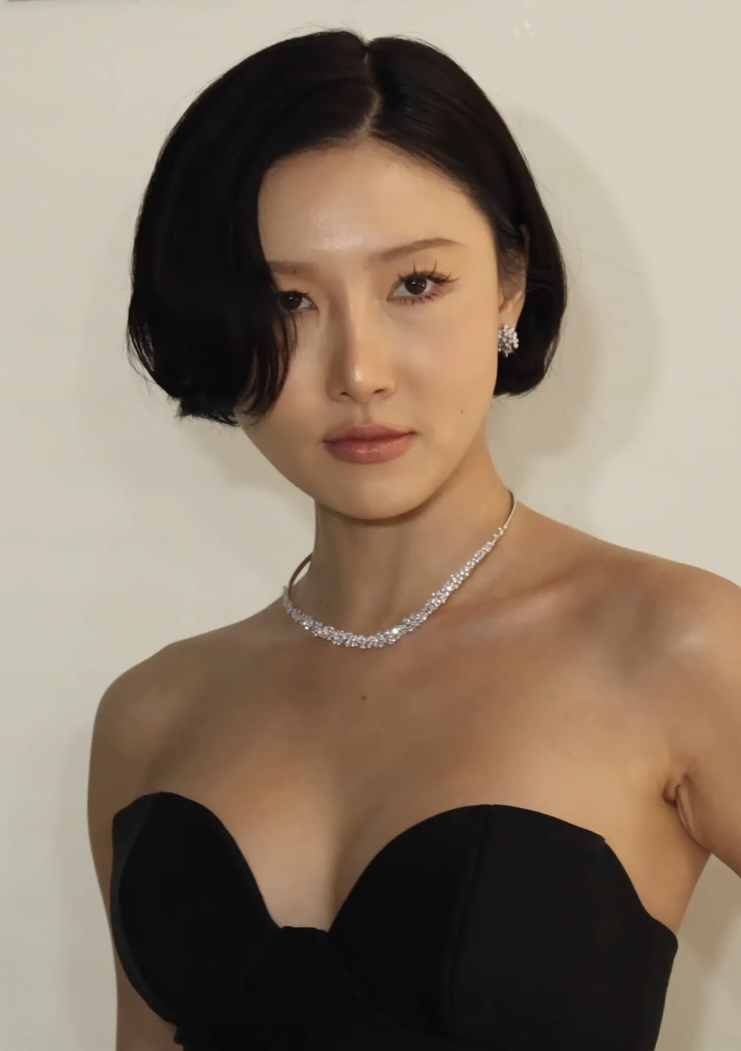
- Hwasa in January 2026
- Born: Ahn Hye-jin; July 23, 1995 (age 31); Jeonju, North Jeolla, South Korea
- Occupations: Singer; songwriter; television personality
- Musical career
- Genres: K-pop; Jazz; R&B
- Instrument: Vocals
- Years active: 2014–present
- Labels: RBW; P Nation
- Member of: Mamamoo
- Formerly of: Refund Sisters
- Website: Official website

Korean name
- Hangul: 안혜진
- Hanja: 安惠眞
- RR: An Hyejin
- MR: An Hyejin

Stage name
- Hangul: 화사
- Hanja: 華莎
- RR: Hwasa
- MR: Hwasa

Signature
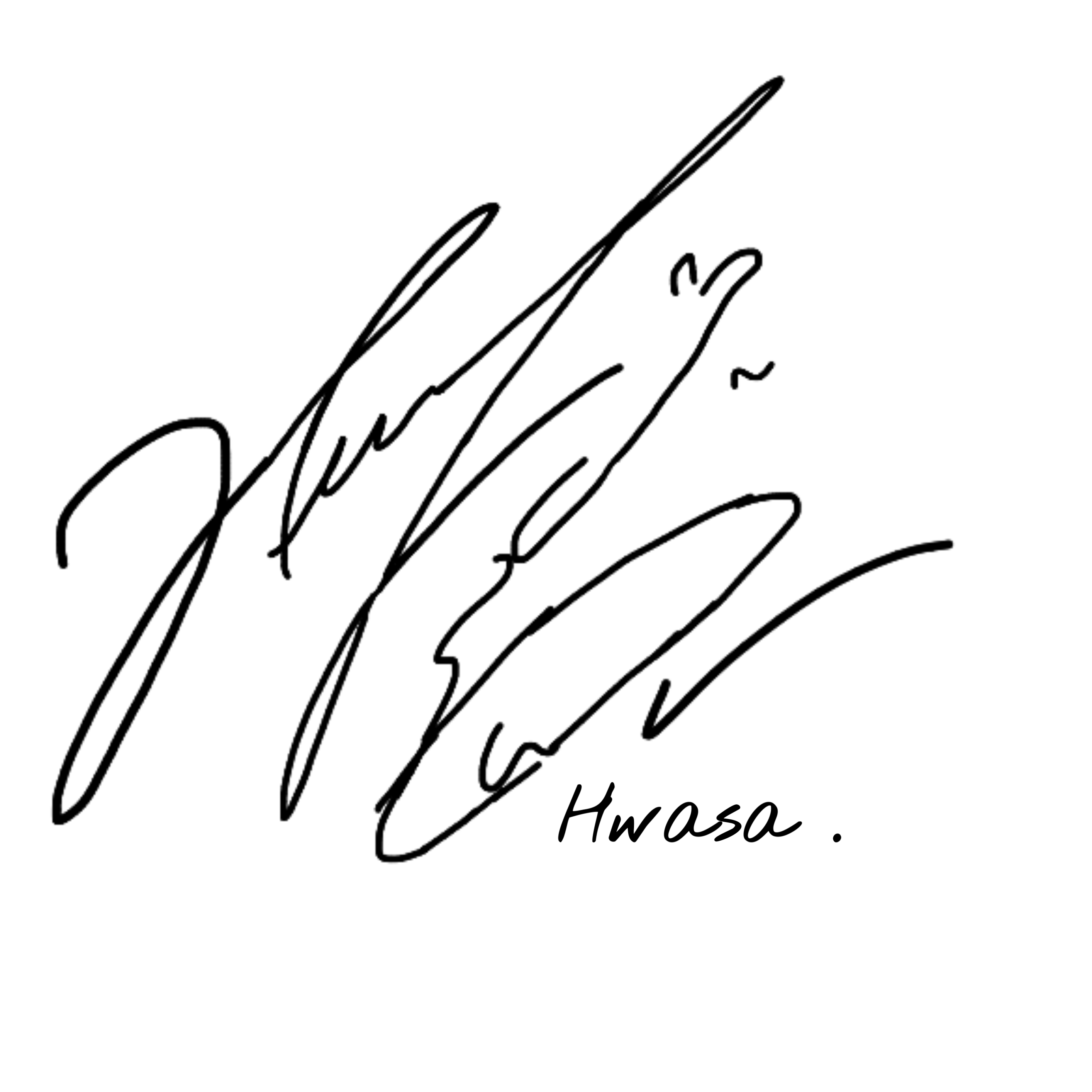

Ahn Hye-jin (Korean: 안혜진; born July 23, 1995), known professionally by her stage name Hwasa (화사; sometimes stylized as Hwa Sa), is a South Korean singer, songwriter, and television personality. She rose to prominence as a member of the girl group Mamamoo in 2014. In February 2019, she made her solo debut with the song "Twit" which topped the Circle Digital Chart and won a Gaon Chart Music Award.

In 2020, Hwasa debuted as part of the Refund Sisters with the single "Don't Touch Me", which reached number one in South Korea. In 2020, she released her EP, María, which charted at number five in her home country, while its lead single "María" peaked at number two on the Gaon Chart, earning her a Golden Disc and Mnet Asian Music Award. In 2023, Hwasa left RBW and signed with P Nation, releasing her second digital single, "I Love My Body", which reached the top-ten of the Circle Digital Chart and Billboard World Digital Song Sales chart in the United States. Her 2025 single "Good Goodbye" became her biggest commercial success to date, reaching number 32 on the Billboard Global 200, spending nine weeks at number one on the Circle Digital Chart, and topping the World Digital Song Sales.

== Name ==
The stage name "Hwasa" (화사) is derived from the adjective "화사하다"; hwasahada; lit. 'to shine brightly'. In Hanja, her birth name "혜진" is written as "惠眞" meaning "Grace in Truth".

== Early life ==
Ahn Hye-jin was born on July 23, 1995, in Jeonju, Jeollabuk-do, South Korea, where she lived with her parents and two elder sisters. She graduated from Wonkwang Information Arts High School. Hwasa often cites Beyoncé as her music inspiration, stating that after hearing someone say that she was unique and good at singing but was fat and not pretty, she went home and watched videos of Beyoncé performing all night to comfort herself.

Even before her K-pop debut, a number of South Korean artists – including artist Solbi and the band Standing Egg – recognized her talent and featured her on their tracks when she was 18.

== Career ==
=== 2014–2019: Debut with Mamamoo and launch of solo career ===
Hwasa debuted as a member of the girl group Mamamoo on June 19, 2014, being one of the leading voices with the release of the lead single "Mr. Ambiguous" from their first extended play (EP) Hello. She wrote and composed her first solo song, "My Heart/I Do Me", from Hello.

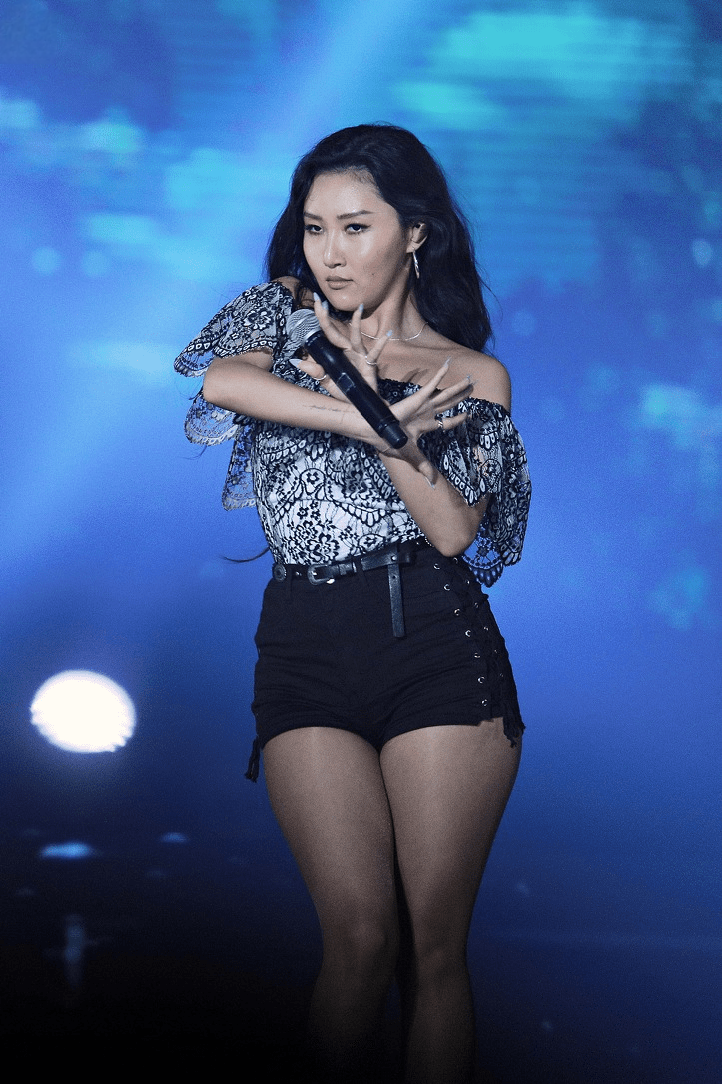
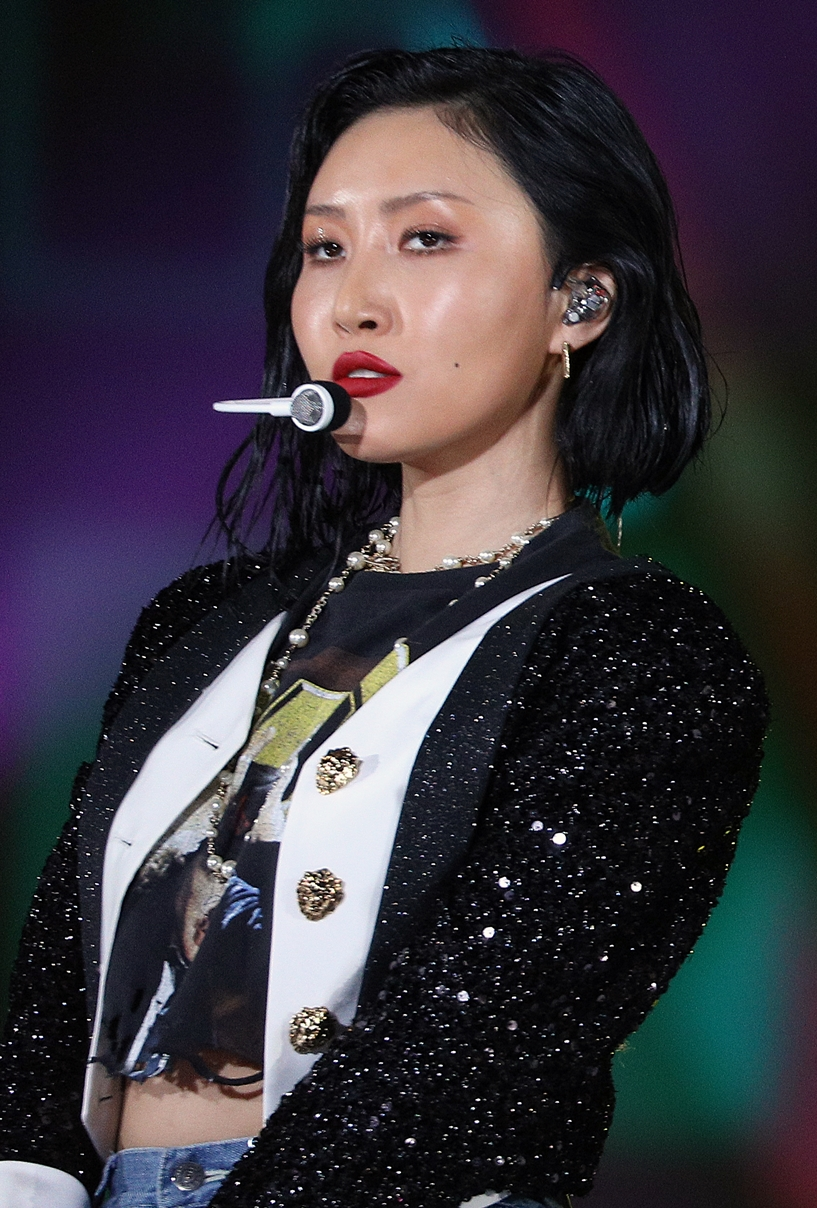
Hwasa performing in 2018 and 2019

In March 2018, Hwasa released her second solo song, "Be Calm", as part of Mamamoo's sixth EP, Yellow Flower. The music video for the song was uploaded on March 25, 2018, and gained 7.9 million views as of August 2022. "Be Calm" charted at number 35 on the Gaon Download Chart. In April 2018, Hwasa joined the cast of KBS reality television show Hyena on the Keyboard; the appearance spawned a collaboration with rapper Loco titled "Don't". Hwasa took part in writing and composing the song, and it topped the South Korean's Gaon Digital Chart. "Don't" was later certified Platinum for 100 million streams in January 2019 and again for 2.5 million downloads in August 2019.

In February 2019, Hwasa made her debut as a solo artist with the digital single, "Twit", which she participated in writing and composing. The song was a commercial success, peaking atop the Gaon Digital Chart and scored a "Triple Crown", topping the Gaon Digital, Gaon Download and Gaon Streaming charts. "Twit" also peaked at number three on Billboard World Digital Song Sales chart for the week of March 2, 2019. Hwasa released the single "In the Fall", a collaboration with South Korean hip-hop producer Woogie, in October. In December, "Twit" was featured in Billboard's "The 25 Best K-pop Songs of 2019: Critics' Pick" list at number 8 and in Refinery29's list of "The Best K-Pop Songs of 2019" at number 13. Its music video was also included in Rolling Stone India's article of the "10 Best K-pop Music Videos of 2019".

=== 2020: María ===
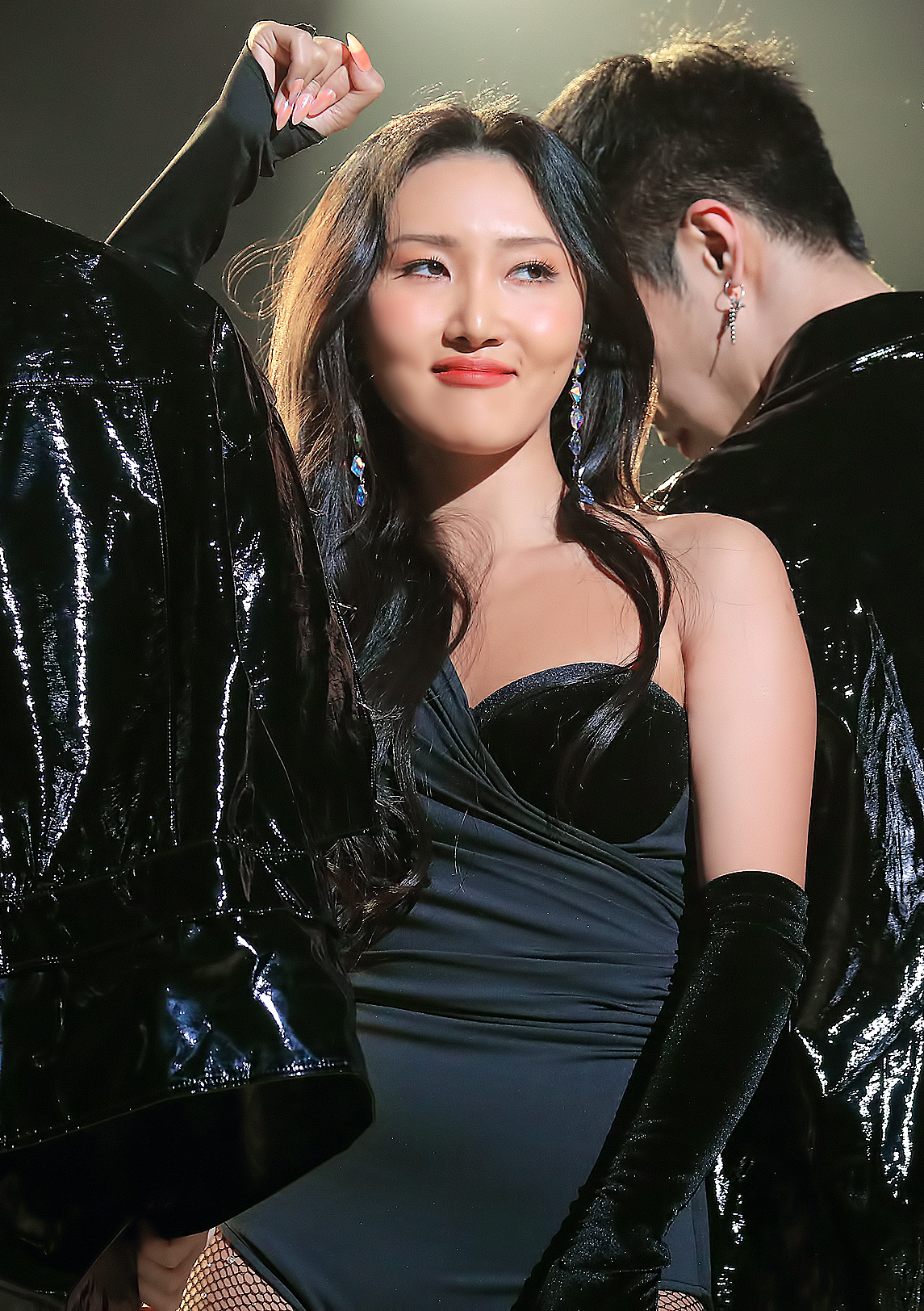
Hwasa in 2020

In March 2020, Hwasa collaborated with English singer Dua Lipa for a remix of Lipa's song "Physical", featuring Korean lyrics. In April, it was reported that Hwasa had joined the original soundtrack lineup of the Korean drama The King: Eternal Monarch and would be releasing her first solo soundtrack song, titled "Orbit". The song debuted at number 16 on Billboard World Digital Song Sales Chart on May 2, 2020.

On June 29, Hwasa released her debut EP, titled María, and the lead single of the same name. The EP debuted at number seven on the Billboard World Albums chart and peaked at number eighty-one on the Billboard Top Current Albums Sales charts on July 11, 2020. Lead single "María" was composed by Hwasa and producer Park Woo-sang with the goal of showing her growth as a singer-songwriter. Hwasa also wrote the lyrics for "LMM" and composed "Why". For the week of September 26, 2020, "María" peaked at number two on Billboard K-pop Hot 100 and on the week of October 3, 2020, it peaked at number 79 on Billboard Japan Hot 100. "María" also debuted at number six on the Billboard World Digital Song Sales chart.

On season six of JTBC's entertainment show Hidden Singer, Hwasa was one of the contestants for the episode airing on September 11, 2020. In the final round, Hwasa won by an overwhelming 79 votes, which ended the four consecutive losing streaks from previous contestants and earned the singer her second win as an original singer of the season. Hwasa joined the cast of MBC reality-variety show How Do You Play? On October 10, she debuted with Refund Sisters, the project supergroup created through Hangout with Yoo. The group released their debut single, "Don't Touch Me". "Don't Touch Me" peaked atop the Gaon Digital Chart for two consecutive weeks.

At the end of 2020, Billboard named "María" the song with the second-most weeks inside the K-pop Hot 100 top 10 during the course of the year—charting for 19 consecutive weeks, while Spotify ranked Hwasa number 4 in their "2020 Most Played Female Korean K-pop Artist" list. "María" was ranked 2nd in Rolling Stone India's list of 20 Best K-pop Music Videos of the year and 27th in Paper's list of best K-pop song list of 40 Best K-pop Songs of 2020. The article mentioned that "Hwasa is known to many as a fearless person but her single 'María' deconstructs that image, casting an image of a young woman who is at once vulnerable and confident, playful and seductive—idol and human." In Time magazine's article documenting K-pop songs and albums that defined the year, the publication wrote "of the solo releases [the] year, Hwasa's "María" leaves the most searing impression". With her success, Hwasa ranked ninth on the "Top 100 Kpop Idols YouTube Worldwide Search Rankings for 2020".

=== 2021–present: Departure from RBW, further solo releases, Twits and "Good Goodbye" ===
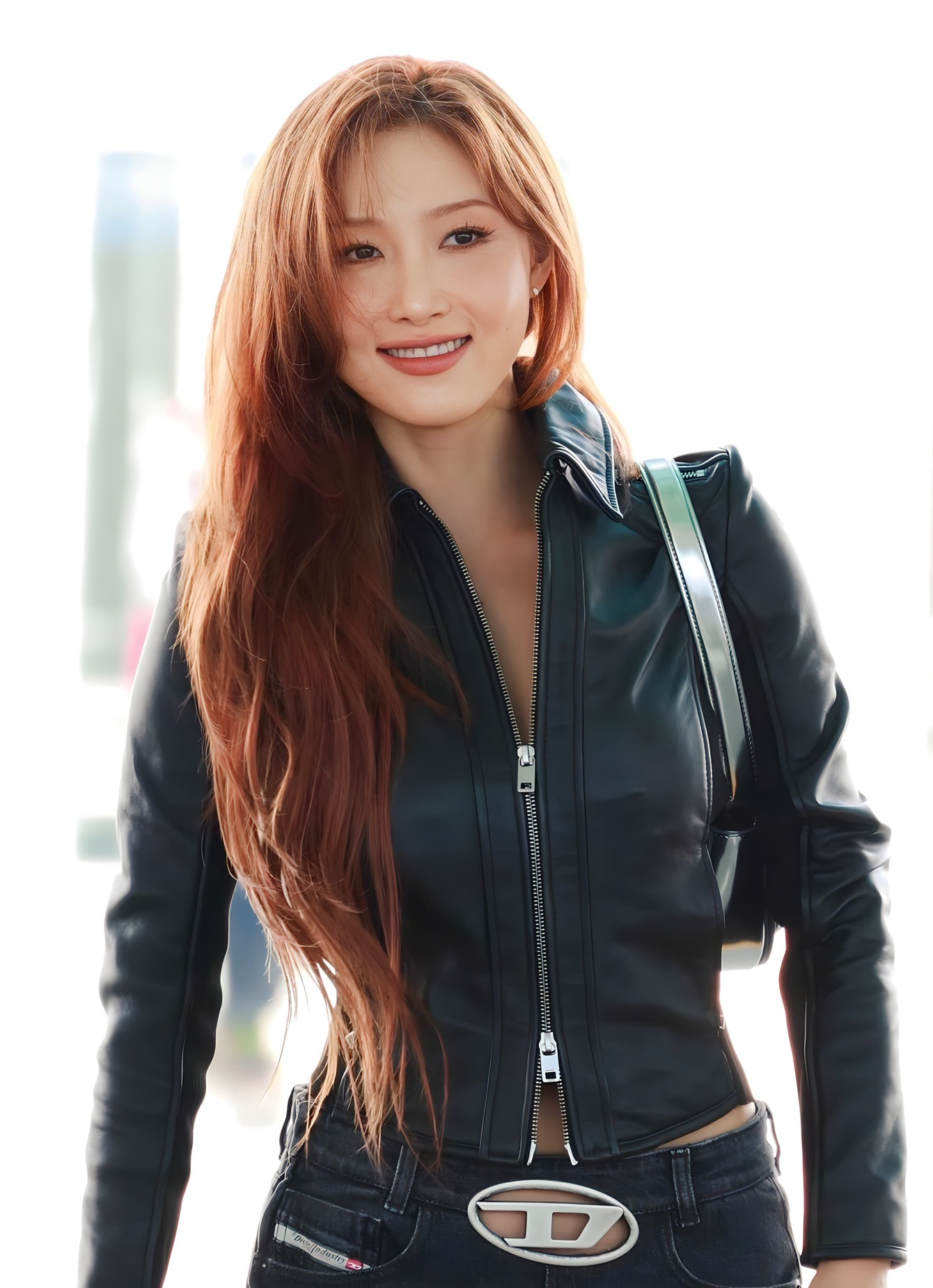
Hwasa in September 2023

On July 23, 2021, Hwasa launched her YouTube channel, "Hwasa Official" and posted her first video. On November 24, she released her single album Guilty Pleasure, and its lead single "I'm a B".

On July 16, 2022, it was announced that Hwasa will collaborate on a new single "Somebody" with Loco, which was released on July 25. On December 8, Hwasa released "Just Talking to Myself", the first soundtrack for her variety program the Hwasa Show aired on tvN. On December 20, she released the show's second soundtrack volume, "Grey Christmas".

In March 2023, it was revealed that Hwasa would be a part of Dancing Queens on the Road, a twelve-episode television variety show aired on tvN, along with Kim Wan-sun, Uhm Jung-hwa, Lee Hyori and BoA. On June 27, it was announced that Hwasa would be leaving RBW after ten years, she signed with P Nation on June 30 while guesting at Psy's Summer Swag concert. On September 6, Hwasa released her second digital single, I Love My Body, which reached the top-ten of the Circle Digital Chart and Billboard World Digital Song Sales chart in the United States. On October 4, Hwasa released "Chili", a digital single for the Mnet show Street Woman Fighter 2.

On March 12, 2024, Hwasa's official fandom name "Twits" was announced. She then announced she would be holding her first tour, titled "Twits", in Seoul, Hong Kong, Taipei and Singapore. On September 19, Hwasa released her second mini album O with the title track "Na". On November 14, she released the track "Star".

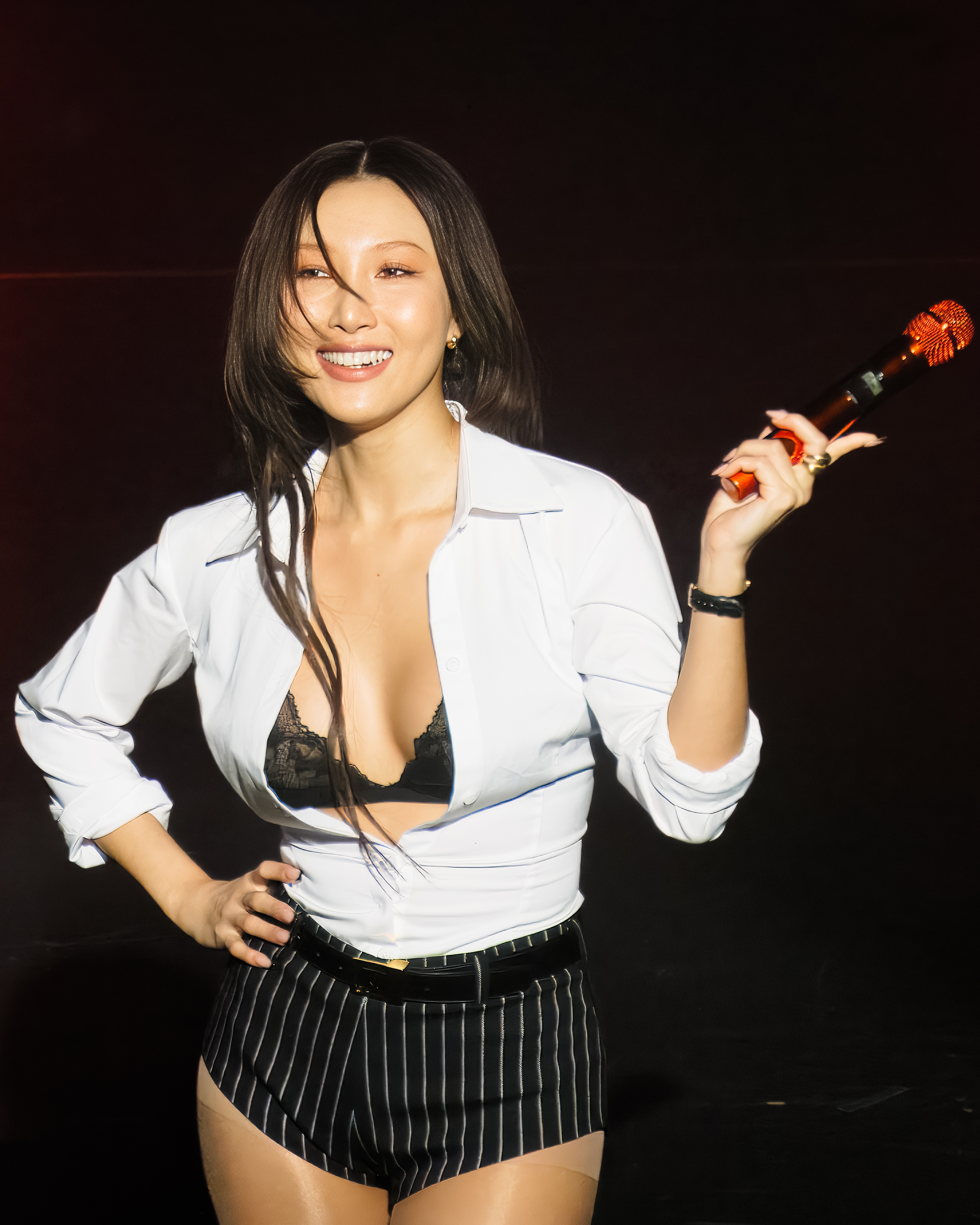
Hwasa performing at her 2025 'Twits' tour in Seattle

In March 2025, Hwasa opened her North American leg of the tour with shows in Seattle, Oakland, Los Angeles, Dallas, Houston, Atlanta, Washington D.C, Brooklyn, Boston, Toronto and Chicago. She continued her tour with a show in Bangkok in August and another in Kaohsiung in September.

On October 15, Hwasa released "Good Goodbye" and its music video starring actor Park Jeong-min. The single charted in the top 10 of all major domestic music charts. A month after its release, the song achieved multiple Real Time All-Kill (RAK) and soon received a Perfect all-kill (PAK). The song reached #32 on the Billboard Global 200. It also became the first song to chart #1 on the Billboard Korea Hot 100 chart after its launch. The track soon secured its place as the song with the second-most PAKs of all time, and the song with the most PAKs by a soloist.

On April 9, 2026, Hwasa released the digital single "So Cute" with a music video. On September 11, she performed at the Rock in Rio music festival in Rio de Janeiro.

== Impact and influence ==
Hwasa performing in 2026

Hwasa has appeared on Korea Power Celebrity 40 list placing 26th in 2019, and was featured by Forbes in their 30 Under 30 Asia list of 2021. She was ranked as the 16th most popular K-pop idol in 2018 and 9th in 2019 in annual surveys conducted by Gallup Korea. Also, she was ranked 9th in annual survey for Gallup Korea's Singer of the Year in 2020 under the category selected by respondents in age group 13 to 39. She also has been placed first occasionally on the Korean Business Research Institute's monthly "Individual Girl Group Members Brand Power Ranking".

Hwasa's appearances on the reality shows I Live Alone and Let's Eat Dinner Together have been credited for influencing restaurant habits, food recipes and increased sales of foods and related accessories in South Korea.

In May 2023, the Student and Parent Human Rights Protection Coalition of Sungkyunkwan University filed a police report against Hwasa for public indecency over sexually suggestive dance moves performed at a festival. The complaint escalated to a criminal investigation, but Hwasa was acquitted by police in October, who determined there was insufficient evidence for criminal charges.

In 2025, Hwasa generated significant viral attention for her performance of "Good Goodbye" at the 46th Blue Dragon Film Awards, where she appeared on stage with actor Park Jeong-min. She performed barefoot while Park held a pair of red shoes, mirroring the music video and creating a moment that spread widely across social media. Korean media noted the strong chemistry and storytelling in the performance, calling it another example of the "Hwasa effect", a term used to describe how her stages and appearances often become widely discussed and influential.

In September 2026, Ateez member Mingi confirmed that his rap verse in the group's track "Mamacita" directly referenced to Hwasa's 2020 solo hit "María" and included a wordplay on her stage name (hwasahage). Additionally, during the live performance of the track at The Fact Music Awards, Mingi held a pair of red high heels on stage as a visual homage to the concept from her 2025 music video "Good Goodbye".

== Other ventures ==
=== Ambassadorship ===
Hwasa was chosen as the promotional model and ambassador for the 2021 Lifeplus JTBC Seoul Marathon. In 2025, she was named a promotional ambassador for the Korea Brand & Entertainment Expo (KBEE) 2025 New York, alongside Taemin and actress Ha Ji-won. In 2026, Hwasa was selected as one of the Life Ambassadors of the Cheonmyeong Protection project, a government suicide prevention campaign.

=== Endorsements ===
In November 2017, Hwasa was selected as a model for LG gaming computers. In August 2018, she became the model for Subway's new menu item, "Handmade Rotisserie Chicken series" alongside Bigman. In September 2018, she was selected as an ambassador for outdoor brand The North Face. In October 2018, she became the first female model for Lotte Crunky Gold candy bars since its release in 1984. In December 2018, she was chosen as the model for NE Neungyule's TOEIC brand Tomato TOEIC.

In February 2019, Hwasa was selected as the brand model for Meat Bank's food brand Hwajakaya. In March 2019, she became an endorser for Davich's 'Trevues' lenses. In March 2019, Coca-Cola's ice tea brand Gold Peak Tea selected Hwasa as their new model. She then became the newest muse for makeup brand Rarekind in April 2019. In June 2019, Hwasa became the new model for Everland Caribbean Bay. Hwasa later on was featured on the cover of Cosmopolitan Korea's August 2019 issue. In November, she teamed up with Vogue magazine and Urban Decay cosmetics for their "Pretty Different" and "Queen" inspired concepts. The same month, Ottogi revealed that their newest model for their Jjamppong instant noodles was Hwasa.

In January 2020, The Sims 4 announced that Hwasa would be part of their advertising campaign. EA Korea released "Play With Life", a Sims 4 commercial film video featuring Hwasa. She then teamed up with MCM for the February issue of Elle Korea, a fashion magazine. In February of that year, Hwasa was chosen as an ambassador for sports brand Adidas. Hwasa later on became Kiss New York's new muse in April, and the following month, she was chosen as a model for Lotte Chilsung Beverage's hangover relief drink "Kkaesukang". In June, she was selected as the model for the sleep essentials brand Sense Mom. Hwasa was featured on the cover of Cosmopolitan Korea's August 2020 issue. Tommy Jeans released a campaign pictorial with Hwasa on September 16 for the 2020 Fall Season. In September, Vogue and Gucci had a collaboration campaign from the idea of having time with themselves.

In 2021, Hwasa was featured in Vogue's February 2021 issue. In March, she was featured in a video released to commemorate the opening of the Dolce & Gabbana Seoul Boutique. Throughout the year, she continued to feature in various magazines including W Korea with Burberry in March, Harper's Bazaar with Louis Vuitton in April, Vogue Japan with Dolce & Gabbana in July and W Korea with Dolce & Gabbana in November. In December, she was selected as the model for CityLabs debut game Taego M (MMORPG).

In April 2022, Hwasa was selected as the model for Ash shoes. In September, Hwasa together with Exo's Kai became brand ambassadors for the South Korean health and beauty brand, Olive Young. The duo's nationwide campaign started on September 15 as featured on the company's social media.

In 2023, Hwasa teamed up with Louis Vuitton for the February issue of Marie Claire. In March, she was selected as the model for Ottogi's Jin Bibimmyeon. She went on to attend a few fashion shows and events including Ferragamo's photo call event for their Spring/Summer 2023 collection in March, the Louis Vuitton Women's Pre-Fall show in April, the 75th Bvlgari Serpanti Anniversary event in June, the Diesel Spring/Summer Fashion show at Milan in September and the Valentino L'école Collection Fashion show at Paris in October.

In August 2025, Hwasa was selected as the brand model for the "R.E.D Blemish Clear Soothing Active Essence" by the dermocosmetic brand Dr. G. In March 2026, Hwasa was chosen as the brand model for CJ Wellcare's Byocore Probiotics. She was also selected as the exclusive model for one of Korea's major fried chicken chains, Mexicana Chicken. In April, she was selected as the model for the lingerie brand, Comfort Lab.

== Discography ==
Extended plays

- María (2020)
- O (2024)

== Filmography ==
=== Television series ===
Year	Title	Role	Notes	Ref.
2016	Entourage	Herself	Cameo (Ep. 1)	

=== Television shows ===
Year	Title	Role	Notes	Ref.
2017	King of Mask Singer	Contestant	Episodes 111–112 as "Follow Me Aerobics Girl"	
2018	Hyena on the Keyboard	Producer	Episodes 7–8	
2018–2022	I Live Alone	Regular cast		
2020	Hangout with Yoo	Regular cast	Episodes 56–68 as a part of Refund Sisters (Sil Bi)	
2020	Hidden Singer	Contestant		
2022	Hwasa Show	Host		
2023	Dancing Queens on the Road	Cast Member		
2024	Moving Voices	Cast Member	In Spain	
2024	Bodymentary	Cast Member	SBS special	
2025	Krazy Rich Korean	Cast	Eps 4–5	

=== Web shows ===
Year	Title	Role	Notes	Ref.
2020	Yeoeunpa (Ladies Secret Party)	Cast	Digital spin-off of MBC's I Live Alone	
2022	Saturday Night Live Korea	Host	Season 2 – Episode 8	

=== Radio show ===
Year	Title	Role	Notes	Ref.
2015	K-pop Planet (Note: it was a radio sub-segment within the official program "Kiss the Radio")	DJ	with Im Hyun-sik and Lee Jae-jin	

=== Host ===
Year	Title	Notes	Ref.
2018	Happy Together Season 4	Special Host, Episode 8	
2019	2019 MBC Entertainment Awards	with P.O and Jun Hyun-moo	

=== Music video appearances ===
Year	Song title	Artist	Ref.
2018	"Easy"	Wheein (Feat. Sik-K)	
2025	"South to the West"	An Shinae	

== Tours and concerts ==
- Twits (2024–2025)
