= Dancing Queens on the Road =

2023 South Korean television show

- Promotional poster
- Hangul: 댄스가수 유랑단
- Lit.: Dance Singer Wandering Troupe
- RR: Daenseugasu yurangdan
- MR: Taensŭgasu yurangdan
- Genre: Reality
- Written by: Choi Hye-jung
- Directed by: Kim Tae-ho; Kang Ryung-mi
- Starring: Kim Wan-sun; Uhm Jung-hwa; Lee Hyori; BoA; Hwasa
- Country of origin: South Korea
- Original language: Korean
- No. of episodes: 12

Production
- Running time: 105 minutes

Original release
- Network: tvN
- Release: May 25 – August 10, 2023

Dancing Queens on the Road (Korean: 댄스가수 유랑단) is a 2023 South Korean music-reality television program which premiered on tvN from May 25, 2023, and aired every Thursday at 22:30 (KST) until August 10, 2023.

== Synopsis ==
The show follows Kim Wan-sun, Uhm Jung-hwa, Lee Hyori, BoA, and Hwasa, singers from different generations as they travel across South Korea. They perform concerts and meet fans in each city. The show captured their performances, behind-the-scenes preparation, and daily life on the road. The singers also revisit their hit songs with new arrangements. The idea originated when Lee Hyori and Uhm Jung-hwa talked about doing a tour on the show Seoul Check-In.

== Cast ==
=== Members ===
- Kim Wan-sun
- Uhm Jung-hwa
- Lee Hyori
- BoA
- Hwasa

=== Manager/Host ===
- Hong Hyun Hee

== Episodes ==
Ep.	Broadcast Date	Special appearances
The First Performance	May 25, 2023	–
Summary: The troupe members meet up with each other after a year. Hyori's small idea of putting together a performance group finally becomes true. They head down to Jinhae for the cherry blossom festival. Despite being excited by the pretty cherry blossoms, an unexpected twist surprises the members.
Cherry Blossom Festival	June 1, 2023	–
Summary: The surprise performance at the Korea Naval Academy gets fully revealed. The members all feel a mix of emotions as they perform. Another big performance awaits the members for the highlight of the Jinhae Cherry Blossom Festival. Will the Dancing Queens turn their hard work into success?
Romantic Yeosu	June 8, 2023	–
Summary: The troupe's tour continues in Yeosu. While enjoying the amazing food and romantic vibes of Yeosu, the members show off their performances. The locations of the performances are totally random and unexpected as the fan requests are picked randomly.
Who You Really Are	June 15, 2023	–
Summary: The troupe continues with their next performance in Gwangyang. Jung-hwa and Wan-sun get emotional after meeting their fans. BoA presents the performance she hadn't for a long time. Hyori gives the best performance for the person she cherishes the most.
The Troupe Goes to College Festivals	June 22, 2023	Loco, Rhymer, PSY, Winner, Jay Park
Summary: The troupe is invited to college festivals. Only the hottest singers are invited to these festivals, so the members are grateful. However, some members are worried because they think young college students might not know who they are. Fellow singers who are invited to the festivals give the members tips to capture the young audience.
The Troupe Goes to Gwangju	June 29, 2023	RalRal
Summary: The members are going to switch songs and perform them in their styles. Hyori invites Hwasa to Jeju to talk about Hwasa's song which she will sing. Jung-hwa learns how to look fierce from Hyori and RalRal. BoA and Hyori performs at a girls’ high school. Meanwhile, the members are invited to a Zumba dance festival.
Hit Song Switch Project	July 6, 2023	Lee Sang-soon
Summary: Many fans gathered at Gwangju to meet their stars. Jung-hwa tells BoA how to sing her song, "Invitation." Since BoA isn't used to singing a song with a sexy vibe, she finds it hard to focus. Hwasa and Wan-sun talk about fashion and talk about Wan-sun's hit songs. Meanwhile, Hyori and Sang-soon show off great chemistry on stage.
The Troupe Goes to Yangyang	July 13, 2023	Hyunjae, Woo Won-jae
Summary: Wan-sun is tasked with performing "Only One," with none other than BoA as her personal dance coach. Along with her secret weapon, Wan-sun is ready to head on stage to show off her dance moves. Meanwhile, Jung-hwa and Hwasa show off their charisma in Gwangju. The troupe now heads to its fifth destination Yangyang to catch up and enjoy delicious food in Gangwon Province.
The Troupe Visits the Five-Day Market	July 20, 2023	–
Summary: The troupe continues its journey in Yangyang, where the members will busk at a market. They must also create their own stage costumes from what they can find at the marketplace. The two eldest members, Jung-hwa and Wan-sun, show off their powerful performances while the other members support their stage.
The Troupe Performs at Pyeongchang	July 27, 2023	Le Sserafim, Mamamoo, Queen Wasabii & KittiB (BB sisters)
Summary: The troupe begins to prepare a concert at its sixth destination, Pyeongchang. "Song For You" is the theme of their concert. The members each choose a song for their special someone and express their gratitude to them through music. With the help of special guests, the troupe's performances become even more exciting.
The Final Concert in Seoul (1)	August 3, 2023	Mamamoo, Justhis, Seulgi, Hyuna, Rain, Zico, Taemin
Summary: The troupe arrives at its last destination, Seoul. The members take song requests and work hard to perform them on stage to fulfill their fans' wishes. Jung-hwa and Wan-sun prepare to reveal their new songs for the first time on the show. The five troupe members practice their group song, "Rainbow."
The Final Concert in Seoul (2)	August 10, 2023	Mamamoo, Justhis, Seulgi, Hyuna, Rain, Zico, Taemin
Summary: The troupe continues its Seoul concert. Each member chooses and performs her last song on the road. Jung-hwa and Wan-sun reveal their new songs to the audience. Male singers come by to perform as guest singers. Finally, the troupe performs its group song, "Rainbow." How will the troupe's journey come to an end?

== Original soundtrack ==
On August 10, 2023, a soundtrack album consisting of the group song "Rainbow" along with "Last Kiss" by Kim Wan-sun, "Disco Energy" by Uhm Jung-hwa (feat. Justhis) and the instrumentals of all three were released.

== Ratings ==
Ep.	Broadcast date	Average audience share (Nielsen Korea)	
Ep.	Broadcast date	Nationwide	Seoul
1	May 25, 2023	3.167%	3.674%
2	June 1, 2023	4.188%	5.251%
3	June 8, 2023	3.672%	4.367%
4	June 15, 2023	4.289%	5.244%
5	June 22, 2023	3.749%	4.278%
6	June 29, 2023	3.469%	4.129%
7	July 6, 2023	3.796%	4.594%
8	July 13, 2023	3.396%	4.084%
9	July 20, 2023	3.840%	3.949%
10	July 27, 2023	3.710%	4.025%
11	August 3, 2023	2.545%	3.046%
12	August 10, 2023	3.574%	4.011%

- In the table above, the blue numbers represent the lowest ratings and the red numbers represent the highest ratings.
- This show airs on a cable channel/pay TV which normally has a relatively smaller audience compared to free-to-air TV/public broadcasters (KBS, SBS, MBC & EBS).
