= María (Hwasa song) =

2020 single by Hwasa

Single by Hwasa

from the EP María
- Language: Korean
- Released: June 29, 2020
- Recorded: 2019–2020
- Genre: Dance; trap; synth-pop; Latin pop
- Length: 3:19
- Label: RBW
- Songwriters: Park Woosang; Hwasa
- Producers: Park Woosang; Hwasa

Hwasa singles chronology
"Orbit" (2020)	"María" (2020)	"Hop In" (2020)

Music video
- "María" on YouTube

"María" (Korean: 마리아) is a song recorded by South Korean singer Hwasa. It was released as the lead single of her first extended play of the same name on June 29, 2020. It is primarily a dance song that incorporates heavy elements of trap, synth, and Latin pop, with lyrics revolving around the struggles that come with fame, "the emotions that need to be suppressed and the effect being in the public eye has on one’s mental health." It was written and produced by Park Woosang and Hwasa.

“Maria” was an instant hit upon release, debuting at number two on the Gaon Charts and managing to stay within the top ten for multiple weeks on the said chart. It won Best Digital Song at the Golden Disc Awards, Song of the Year at the Asian Pop Music Awards, and Best Dance Performance at the Mnet Asian Music Awards. In addition, the song was certified platinum by the Korea Music Content Association for surpassing 100 million streams in the country.

To promote the song, Hwasa performed on multiple South Korean music programs, including Music Bank, and M Countdown. Additionally, the song won the triple crown on Inkigayo without Hwasa appearing to perform.

== Composition ==
“Maria” was written and produced by Park Woo-sang and Hwasa. It is a dance track that combines elements of trap, synth, and upbeat Latin pop section over the bridge, "which makes a slightly strange segue into a ballad-y string section." In terms of musical notation, the song was written in the key of A Minor with a tempo of 129 beats per minute.

Lyrically, it "describe the struggles that come with fame, outlining the emotions that need to be suppressed and the effect being in the public eye has on one’s mental health. Hwasa sings, “I’m so lonely/I swallowed my hatred/I don’t even have the strength to be angry/I don’t have time.” She encourages herself to stand up and keep fighting, quite literally instructing herself not to bow to public criticism, inline with the lyrics “Why do you keep struggling/You are already beautiful… I’ll change the way I go/I’ll turn crisis into opportunity/If you really want to see me cry/Tears in your eyes.”

== Critical reception ==
Time's Kat Moon described the track as "sleek and sultry" praising the singer's "distinct charisma" as well as the usage of the singer's low tone over syncopated drum beats.

Year-end lists
Critic/Publication	List	Rank	Ref.
Time	The Songs and Albums That Defined K-Pop's Monumental Year in 2020	—N/a	
Billboard	A Look Back at Billboard's K-Pop 100 Chart in 2020 and All Its Big Players	—N/a	
Rolling Stone India	20 Best K-pop Music Videos of 2020	2	
Paper	The 40 Best K-pop Songs of 2020	27	

== Accolades ==
Awards and nominations
Year	Award	Category	Result	Ref.
2020	Asian Pop Music Awards (Note: Hosted by the Hong Kong Asia Pacific International Group and Sunway Records, the Asian Pop Music Awards bases its winners on the "Asian Pop Music Chart" which opened in September 2019)	Song of the Year (Overseas)	Won	
2020	Mnet Asian Music Awards	Best Dance Performance – Solo	Won	
2020	Melon Music Awards	Best Dance Award (Female)	Nominated	
2020	Golden Disc Awards	Best Digital Song (Bonsang)	Won	
2020	Seoul Music Awards	Bonsang Award	Nominated	

Music program awards
Program	Date	Ref.
Inkigayo	July 26, 2020	
Inkigayo	August 2, 2020	
Inkigayo	August 9, 2020	
Music Bank	August 14, 2020	
Music Bank	August 21, 2020	

== Credits and personnel ==
Song credits

- Hwasa – vocals, lyricist, composition, record producer, director, chorus
- Park Woo-sang – lyricist, composition, arrangement, synthesizer, record producer, director, chorus, drum programming, recording (@ RBW Studio)
- Jiyong Park – keyboard
- Eunkyung Jung – recording (@ In Grid Studio)
- Minhee Kim – recording (@ 821 Sound)
- Kim Do-hoon – executive producer
- Kim Jin-woo – executive producer
- Lim In-yong – supervisor
- Shin Su-jin – supervisor
- Namwoo Kwon – mastering
- Chris Gehringer – mastering

Visual credits

- VM Project Architecture – music video director
- Lee Seokjun – music video director (Hobin Film)
- Jeon Hyo-jeong – performance director
- Lia Kim – choreographer
- Tina Boo – choreographer
- Yeji Kim (1 Million studios) – choreographer

== Charts ==
=== Weekly charts ===
Weekly chart performance
Chart (2020)	Peak position
Japan (Japan Hot 100)	79
Malaysia (RIM)	8
Singapore (RIAS)	5
South Korea (Gaon)	2
South Korea (K-pop Hot 100)	2
US World Digital Song Sales (Billboard)	6

=== Monthly charts ===
Monthly chart performance
Chart (2020)	Peak position
South Korea (Gaon)	2

=== Year-end charts ===
2020 year-end chart performance for "María"
Chart (2020)	Peak position
South Korea (Gaon)	18

2021 year-end chart performance for "María"
Chart (2021)	Peak position
South Korea (Gaon)	119

== Certifications ==
Certifications
Region	Certification	Certified units/sales
South Korea (KMCA)	Platinum	100,000,000^{†}
^{†} Streaming-only figures based on certification alone.

== Release history ==
Release history
Region	Date	Format	Label
Various	June 29, 2020	Digital download; streaming	RBW

== See also ==
- List of Inkigayo Chart winners (2020)
- List of Music Bank Chart winners (2020)
