= Kim Wan-sun =

South Korean pop singer (born 1969)

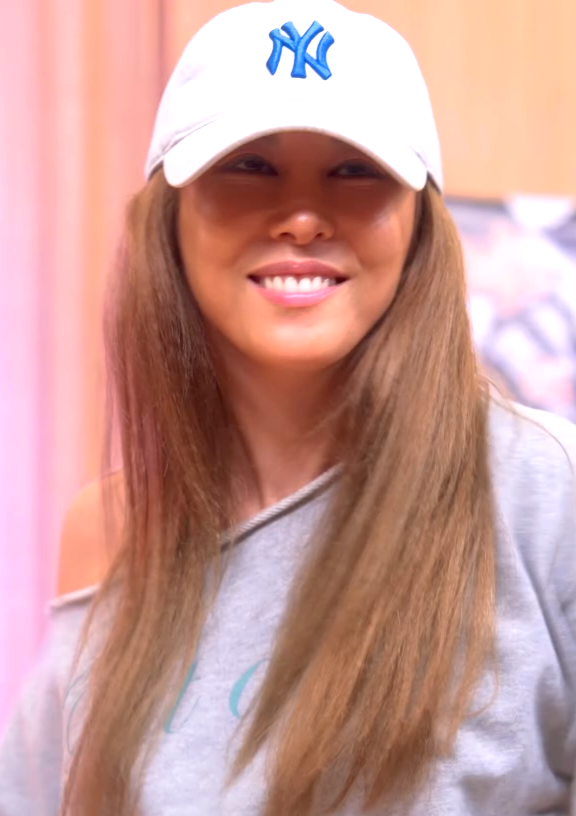
- Kim in June 2025
- Born: Kim I-sun; May 16, 1969 (age 57); Seoul, South Korea
- Occupations: Singer; actress
- Years active: 1986–present
- Musical career
- Genres: K-pop; Mandopop; synth-pop; funk

Korean name
- Hangul: 김완선
- Hanja: 金緩宣
- RR: Gim Wanseon
- MR: Kim Wansŏn

Birth name
- Hangul: 김이선
- RR: Gim Iseon
- MR: Kim Isŏn

Signature
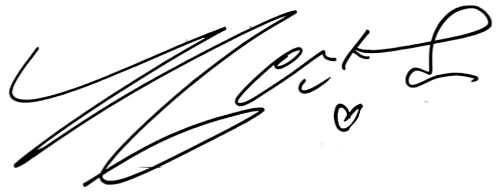

Kim Wan-sun (Korean: 김완선; Hanja: 金緩宣; born May 16, 1969) is a South Korean pop singer who was known in the mid-1980s and early 1990s as the "Korean Madonna" and "the dancing queen of Korean popular music's renaissance era" as well as a sex symbol for her "sexy" dancing and "charismatic" stage presence.

Kim debuted in 1986 with the album, Tonight. Her fifth album, 1990's Pierrot Smiles at Us, sold 1 million copies. She is considered to be one of the first wave of Hallyu artists due to her success in Taiwan in the mid-1990s.

== Early life ==
Kim Wan-sun was born Kim I-sun on May 16, 1969, the third of her parents' five daughters. When she was in middle school, Kim began training to be a singer and dancer under the guidance of her aunt, Han Baek-hee, who managed successful musicians including the singer Insooni. Han rigorously trained Kim for three years, during which time Kim dropped out of school and did not visit her parents. She studied digital art at the University of Hawaiʻi at Mānoa.

== Career ==
=== 1986–1990s: Debut and early success ===
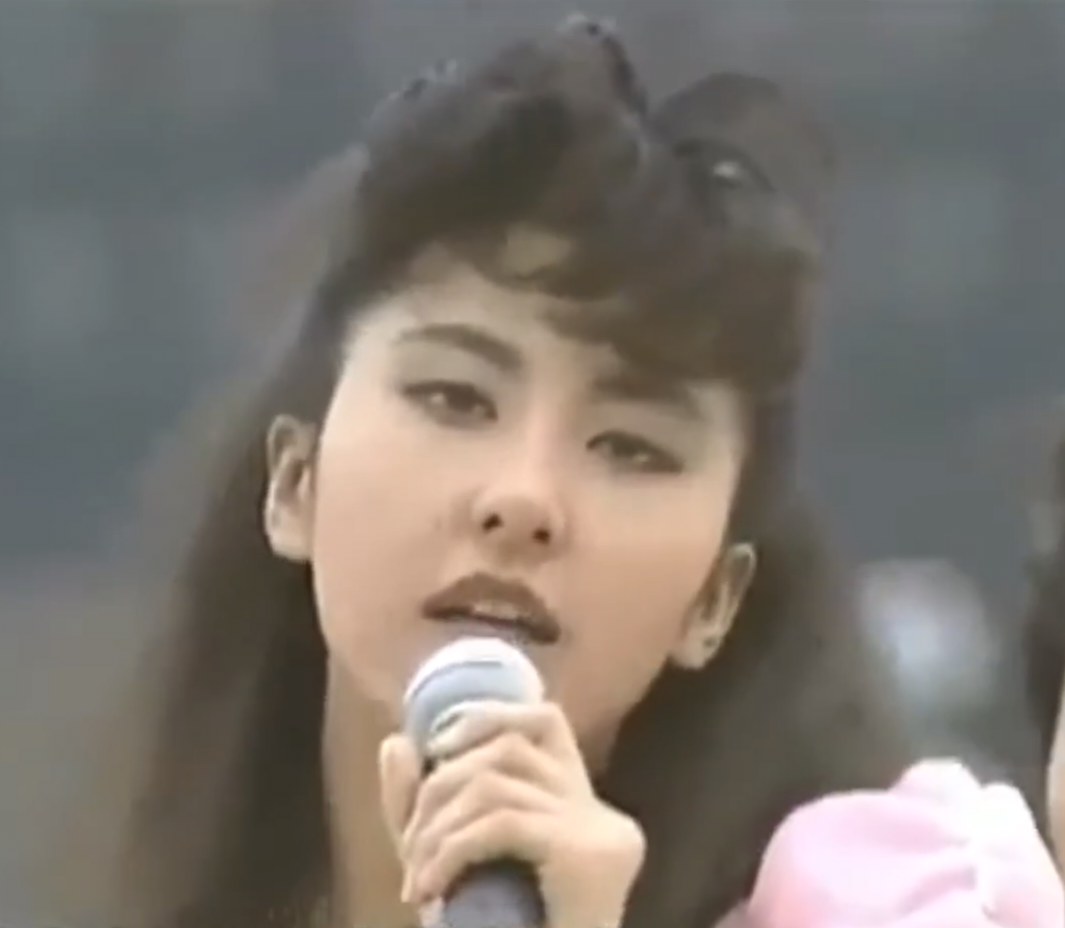
Kim performing in 1987

Kim made her official debut in 1986 at the age of 17 with her album Tonight. Her debut was different from the ballad singers who were popular then. She became known as the "dancing queen" and the "Korean Madonna" because of her energetic dancing and strong stage presence. She won the Rookie of the Year award at several award ceremonies, including the 1st Golden Disc Awards and the 1986 KBS Music Awards. Her career included many popular songs. Her fifth album, Pierrot Smiles at Us, sold over 1 million copies in 1990, making it the first album by a Korean female solo artist to do so.

Outside of Korea, Kim's fame also grew in Taiwan in the mid-1990s, where she was one of the first Korean stars to be successful. In a 2011 interview, she also talked about her temporary "retirement" in 1992, which was her aunt's plan to help her in other parts of Asia. Kim said she cried when the announcement was made because she knew it was not true.

After her "temporary retirement" in 1992, she moved to Taiwan and Hong Kong. Her aunt's plan was to promote her as an "Asian singer," not just a Korean one. She released three albums in Mandarin Chinese. During this time, it was revealed that she was in deep financial debt. She had not been paid for her work during the 13 years her aunt managed her, as her aunt had invested all her earnings in her husband's business, which later failed. This led her to take on side jobs as an actress and model.

She returned to Korea in 1996, releasing her seventh album, Innocence. However, she did not regain the same level of popularity as her earlier career.

=== 2000–2010: Hiatus, education and return ===
After her aunt's death, Kim went on a long hiatus from music. She moved to Hawaii to study digital art at the University of Hawaiʻi at Mānoa, staying there for three years. She made a comeback in 2002 with the album S & Remake and released Return in 2005.

=== 2010–present: Career resurgence ===
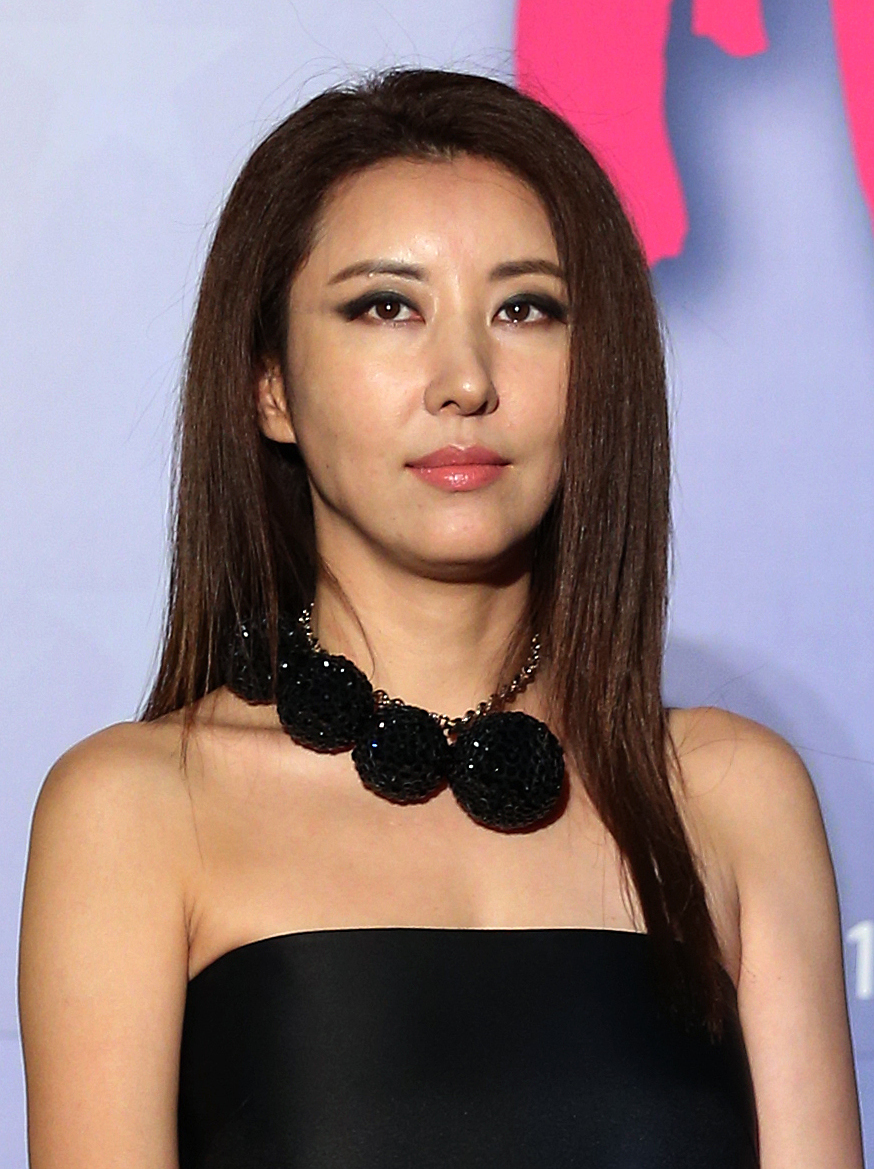
Kim in 2013

Beginning in 2011, Kim experienced a career resurgence. She released a new mini-album, Super Love, and made frequent appearances on television shows. Her candid confessions about her past and the public's nostalgia for her music helped her reconnect with a new generation of fans. In January 2013, she was selected as one of Mnet's "Legendary 100 Artists". She was chosen as the new MC for MBC's Sunday late-night music program Beautiful Concert. In March 2014, Kim was appointed as a visiting professor in the entertainment department at Kookje University.

Since May 2015, Kim was a regular cast member on the SBS entertainment program Burning Youth. She won the Rookie of the Year award at the 2015 SBS Entertainment Awards. In September, Kim made a surprise debut as an interior designer by collaborating with Hotel The Designers on celebrity-themed rooms. She designed a room for their locations in both Gangnam and Dongdaemun.

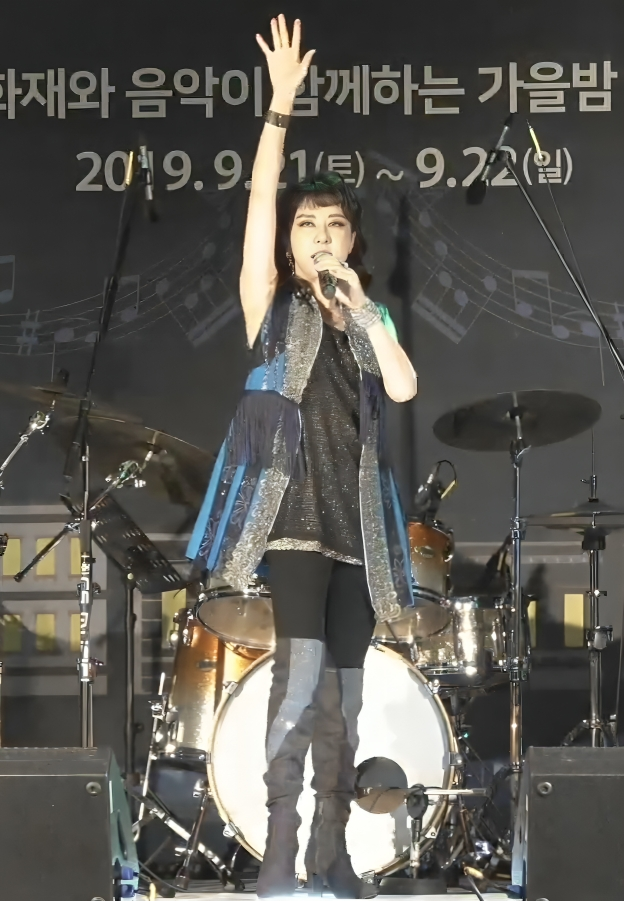
Kim performing in 2019

In April 2017, Kim held a solo concert at Blue Square in Seoul to celebrate her 30th debut anniversary. In addition, from July 1 to 3, 2022, she held a special exhibition titled 'Here I Am' at the Ulsan Exhibition Convention Center.

In April 2025, Kim was chosen as the new model for Hyundai Pharmaceutical's dietary fiber beverage brand Miero Fiber. She has since released new music, including digital singles and EPs and has collaborated with artists and even written songs for other projects.

== Personal life ==
Kim's one-person firm KW Sunflower (케이더블유썬플라워), founded in 2020 with her listed as representative, was reported in September 2025 to have operated for about five years without popular-culture planning-business registration. Coverage treated that as a suspected breach of the Popular Culture and Arts Industry Development Act (up to two years' imprisonment or a ₩20 million fine). A company official said the legal team had confirmed the omission and was filing the administrative registration. Yongin Eastern Police later sent her to the Suwon District Prosecutors' Office without detention, saying the allegation was made out. Later reports said registration was completed in November 2025. In May 2026 prosecutors issued a suspended indictment on the unregistered-agency allegation.

== Discography ==
=== Studio albums ===
Title	Album details	Peak chart positions	Sales
Title	Album details	KOR	Sales
Korean
Tonight (오늘밤)	Released: April 11, 1986; Label: Jigu Records; Format: LP, cassette; Track listing Side A: 1. 지난 이야기; 2. 오늘밤; 3. 별 하나 나 하나; 4. 왜 말 못해; 5. 안돼; 6. 봄; Side B: 1. 왜 아니오나; 2. 고독; 3. 그 사람 미워요; 4. 그 한마디; 5. 어떤 그림; 6. 평화로운 세계; 7. 정화의 노래 (건전가요)	—N/a	
Alone in Front of the Yard (나홀로 뜰앞에서)	Released: May 7, 1987; Label: Jigu Records; Format: LP, cassette; Track listing Side A: 1. 나홀로 뜰앞에서; 2. 그대여 다시 오세요; 3. 선물; 4. 겨울풍경; 5. 어차피 우린; Side B: 1. 슬픈 얼굴 보이긴 싫어; 2. 노란 벤취; 3. 강변연가; 4. 충격; 5. 이 세상 어린이 (건전가요)	—N/a	
Too Lonely to Dance Alone (나홀로 춤을 추긴 너무 외로워)	Released: August 20, 1988; Label: Jigu Records; Format: LP, cassette; Track listing Side A: 1. 나홀로 춤을 추긴 너무 외로워; 2. 편지; 3. 그건 너 4. 나 그대에게 모두 드리리; 5. 사랑의 골목길; Side B: 1. 사랑의 골목길; 2. 잊혀진 사람; 3. 너는 아니?; 4. 휘파람을 부세요	—N/a	
Feel Good Day (기분 좋은 날)	Released: June 10, 1989; Label: Jigu Records; Format: LP, cassette; Track listing Side A: 1. 이 세상 슬픔 가운데; 2. 이별보다 더 큰 슬픔; 3. 기분 좋은 날 4. 불빛을 좀 더 어둡게 해줘요; 5. 보라빛 레인코트; Side B: 1. 싫어요; 2. 이젠 잊기로 해요; 3. 추억은 가슴 속에 남으리; 4. 5월의 눈물; 5. 이젠 혼자 일어서야 해	—N/a	
Pierrot Smiles at Us (삐에로는 우릴 보고 웃지)	Released: August 21, 1990; Label: Asia Records; Format: CD, LP, cassette; Track listing Side A: 1. 가장 무도회; 2. 나만의 것 3. 삐에로는 우릴 보고 웃지; 4. 어느 봄날; 5. 마지막 밀회; Side B: 1. 어디 있었나요; 2. 작은 카페 이야기; 3. 모노드라마; 4. 잃어버린 도시	—N/a	KOR: 1,000,000+
Sadness (애수)	Released: July 1, 1992; Label: Asia Records; Format: CD, cassette; Track listing: 1. 애수; 2. 그대는 바람처럼; 3. 슬픈 체념; 4. 가난한 이별; 5. 하얀비; 6. 생의 또다른 슬픔; 7. 힘든 미소; 8. 이상한 외출; 9. 자유로운 날엔; 10. 애수 (Instrumental); 11. 슬픈 체념 (Instrumental)	—N/a	
Innocence	Released: November 1, 1996; Label: King Records; Format: CD, cassette; Track listing: 1. 탤런트; 2. 운명의 장난; 3. 슬픔같은 행복; 4. 슬픈 인연; 5. 투정; 6. 체인징 파트너; 7. 삐에로의 회상; 8. 운명의 장난 (Remix)	—N/a	
S & Remake	Released: July 23, 2002; Label: Yedang Entertainment; Format: CD, cassette; Track listing Disc 1: S: 1. S 2. Shall We Dance; 3. Seduction; 4. 질주; 5. Only Love; 6. Feel So Good; 7. Shadow; 8. 보낼 수 없는 사랑; 9. Another Me; 10. I Don`t Want To Hear It From You; 11. S (Chinese Ver.); 12. Seduction (Wtse-Han Jae Won Mix); 13. 질주 (Wtse-Han Jae Won Mix); 14. Feel So Good (Wtse-Han Jae Won Mix); 15. Shall We Dance (Wtse-Han Jae Won Mix); 16. S (Wtse-Han Jae Won Mix); Disc 2: Remake album: 1. 지난 이야기; 2. 리듬속의 그 춤을; 3. 애수; 4. 그대는 바람처럼; 5. 가장 무도회; 6. 나홀로 뜰앞에서; 7. 삐에로는 우릴 보고 웃지; 8. 모노드라마; 9. 하얀비	35	KOR: 7,647+
Return	Released: October 25, 2005; Label: Doremi Records; Format: CD, cassette; Track listing: 1. 서른의 노래; 2. 모짜르트 듣는 여자; 3. 처음 이별하는 듯 4. Seventeen; 5. 산책; 6. 정말이지 나는; 7. 시간을 삼켜도; 8. White Wine; 9. 애수; 10. 느끼는대로만; 11. Do It	—	
Taiwanese
The First Touch (第一次接觸)	Released: July 14, 1994; Label: PolyGram; Format: CD; Track listing: 1. 女人的心都一樣; 2. 肯定的美麗; 3. 在你背後的我; 4. 坦白; 5. 愛上風雨中走來的你 (with Alan Tam); 6. 我就是你的; 7. 傷心是爲誰; 8. 但是又何奈; 9. 一顆心換一份情; 10. 愛得甛蜜	—N/a	
Extremely Attractive (極度魅力)	Released: June 20, 1995; Label: PolyGram; Format: CD; Track listing: 1. 莎哟娜啦 (by Leon Lai); 2. 辣辣的心 (by Leon Lai); 3. 情已逝 (by Jacky Cheung); 4. 我和我追逐的夢 (by Andy Lau); 5. 愛不完 (by Andy Lau); 6. 我是不是該安靜的走開 (by Aaron Kwok); 7. 一路上有你 (by Jacky Cheung); 8. 謝謝你的愛 (by Andy Lau); 9. 渴望 (by Aaron Kwok); 10. 你冷得像風 (by Jacky Cheung)	—N/a	
Mi Mi Hu Hu (迷迷糊糊)	Released: April 24, 1996; Label: PolyGram; Format: CD; Track listing: 1. 迷迷糊糊; 2. 言不由衷; 3. 借我一條手帕; 4. 愛情萬歲; 5. 誘惑; 6. 這一次我真的需要你挽留; 7. 就爱吧; 8. 噓 ! 現在別說話; 9. 音樂是我快樂的世界; 10. 多愛我一點	—N/a	
"—" denotes release did not chart.

=== Compilation albums ===
Title	Album details	Peak chart positions
Title	Album details	KOR
The Original	Released: April 17, 2017; Label: K. W. Sunflower Entertainment; Format: CD, digital download; Track listing Disc 1: 1. 지난이야기; 2. 오늘밤; 3. 그대여 다시 오세요; 4. 나홀로 뜰앞에서; 5. 강변연가; 6. 선물; 7. 편지; 8. 잊혀진 사람; 9. 사랑의 골목길; 10. 나 그대에게 모두 드리리; 11. 이젠 혼자 일어서야해; 12. 싫어요; 13. 이젠 잊기로 해요; 14. 리듬속의 그춤을; Disc 2: 1. 이별보다 더 큰 슬픔; 2. 불빛을 좀 더 어둡게 해줘요; 3. 기분 좋은 날 4. 삐에로는 우릴 보고 웃지; 5. 어느 봄날; 6. 작은 카페이야기; 7. 나만의 것 8. 가장 무도회; 9. 모노 드라마; 10. 잃어버린 도시; 11. 애수>; 12. 그대는 바람처럼; 13. 하얀비; 14. 이상한 외출; Disc 3: 1. 오늘; 2. Benjamin; 3. Can Only Feel (Remix Ver.); 4. 강아지; 5. Use Me (Feat. Ravi Of VIXX); 6. Set Me On Fire (Feat. Kebee); 7. Mir; 8. Alien; 9. It's You; 10. Use Me (DJ HEAD Mix); 11. Use Me (DJ Jazz Mix)	—
"—" denotes release did not chart.

=== Extended plays ===
Title	Album details	Peak chart positions
Title	Album details	KOR
Super Love	Released: April 21, 2011; Label: KT Music; Format: CD, digital download; Track listing: 1. Oz On The Moon; 2. Super Love; 3. 슬픈고백; 4. Super Love (Instrumental)	28
The Beer	Released: September 11, 2012; Label: K. W. Sunflower Entertainment; Format: CD, digital download; Track listing: 1. Benjamin; 2. 오늘; 3. Can Only Feel; 4. 오늘 (Instrumental)	39

=== Digital singles & EP ===
Title	Year	Peak chart positions
Title	Year	KOR
"Super Love"	2011	28
"Be Quiet" feat. Yong Jun-hyung	2011	6
"Goodbye My Love" feat. Tiger JK & Bizzy	2014	46
"Puppy" (강아지)	2016	—
"Use Me" feat. Ravi of VIXX	2016	—
"Set Me On Fire"	2016	—
"Odisseya"	2016	—
"Oz On The Moon"	2017	—
"Jelly Christmas"	2017	—
"Tonight"	2018	—
"심장이 기억해"	2018	—
"Feeling"	2022	—
"Apple Blossom"	2022	—
"Lucky" (with Seulgi)	2025	— (Note: "Lucky" did not enter the Circle Digital Chart, but peaked at number 36 on the Download Chart.)
"—" denotes release did not chart.

== Filmography ==
=== Film ===
Year	Title	Role	Notes
2015	Seoul Searching	Kim Wan-sun wannabe	cameo

=== Television series ===
Year	Title	Role	Notes	Ref.
2005	Hello Franceska, Season 3	Serial killer, cameo	Ep 2	
2006	Soulmate	Ballet instructor, cameo	Ep 3	

=== Television show ===
Year	Title	Role	Ref.
2013	Beautiful Concert	Host	
2015	Burning Youth	Cast member	
2023	Dancing Queens on the Road	Cast member	

=== Musical ===
Musical play performances
Year	Title		Role	Theater	Date	Ref.
Year	English	Korean	Role	Theater	Date	Ref.
1987	There's Soup	국물 있사옵니다	Seong Ah-mi	-	MBC Chuseok special	
2012	New Roly Poly	뉴 롤리폴리	Choi Mi-ja	Universal Arts Center	May 2, 2012- June 3, 2012	
2023	Again, High School Classmates	Again 여고동창생	Chu Ja	Roun Art Hall	May 25, 2023 - June 11, 2023	
