= María (EP) =

EP by Hwasa
- Released: June 29, 2020
- Recorded: 2018–2020
- Studios: In Grid (Seoul); RBW (Seoul)
- Genres: Dance-pop; R&B; latin pop
- Length: 21:25
- Languages: Korean; English
- Label: RBW
- Producers: Park Woo-sang; Hwasa

Hwasa chronology
María (2020)	Guilty Pleasure (2021)

Singles from María
- 1. "Twit" Released: February 13, 2019; 2. "María" Released: June 29, 2020

María is the debut extended play by South Korean singer and Mamamoo member Hwasa. It was released on June 29, 2020, through RBW. The EP was supported by two singles: the lead single "Twit", which reached number one in South Korea, and the title track "María". For María, Hwasa recorded five new tracks including two collaborations: "Kidding" prod. by rapper Zico and "I'm Bad Too" featuring DPR Live. The album was co-written and produced by Hwasa alongside Park Woo-sang. She stated that the album "is like a diary that contains the emotions she felt as a 24-year-old".

== Background and release ==
In February 2019, Hwasa made her debut as a solo artist with the digital single "Twit", which she co-wrote and co-composed. The song was a commercial success; topping the Gaon digital, download and streaming charts in South Korea, achieving a "Triple Crown".

On June 15 at midnight KST, Hwasa revealed the first teaser image for the album along with the release date. It was also revealed that the EP and title track would be titled "María" (which refers to her baptismal name). On June 16, a video introduction titled "Nobody Else" was released in which she is shown in different locations as she tells a story in a voiceover. On June 22, the track list for María was shared, containing seven songs, including the title track "María", the previous single "Twit" and a new song produced by Zico titled "Kidding". It also contains a song featuring rapper DPR Live called "I'm Bad Too".

== Music and composition ==
"I don't think I've ever worked so passionately on something before. I loved it so much to the point that it hurt. Due to that, I think this album will remain in my memory for a long time."

— Hwasa discussing the making of María

At seven tracks, María is the longest EP in Hwasa's catalogue. Musically, the album is a K-pop record that contains influences of dance, R&B and Latin pop. The lead single of the same name was composed by Hwasa, with her working with producer Park Woo-sang and shows her growth as a singer-songwriter. Hwasa also wrote the lyrics for "LMM" and composed "Why".

The opening track of the album, "Intro: Nobody Else", is a song with profound lyrics against a dramatic soft piano and synth melody convey how sometimes behind a dazzling demeanor, dark thoughts still hide and play on a person's mind. Co-composed by Hwasa and producer Park Woo-sang, “María” combines elements of trap and synth with an upbeat Latin pop section over the bridge, which makes a slightly strange segue into a ballad-y string section. The lyrics describe the struggles that come with fame, outlining the emotions that need to be suppressed and the effect being in the public eye has on one's mental health. Produced by Zico, "Kidding" is a song with a "playful R&B melody" that gives the song a bit of a 90s personality. The song tells the story of an unfaithful lover. "Why" is a dynamic contemporary ballad with a trap synth beat. The song is about an unrequited love. Hwasa's collaboration with DPR Live, "I'm Bad Too," is a dynamic song that features R&B and Latin influences. Hwasa wrote the song about her friendship with DPR Live. "LMM" is a "soul stirring track" with an orchestral tone, piano and violin based melody. The final track, "Twit," is a bouncing pop melody that features chirpy trap beats and tropical house elements as the artist switches between chanting raps and her soaring, powerful vocals. The song was co-written and co-produced by Hwasa with Kim Dohun and Park Woo-sang.

== Promotion ==
=== Singles ===
"Twit" was released on February 13, 2019, as a pre-release single. The music video was directed by Park Sangwon. The single peaked at number one on South Korea's Gaon digital, download and streaming charts. The song also debuted at number three on the US World Digital Song Sales chart and at number 23 on New Zealand's Hot Singles chart. Hwasa performed the song on several music programs in South Korea including Show! Music Core, Music Bank, Inkigayo, and M Countdown. "Twit" later won first place at MBC's Show! Music Core on March 2 and March 16. On the same day as the single's release, the music video of the song was released on YouTube to both Mamamoo's official channel and the 1theK distribution channel. As of December 30, 2022, the music video has 136 million views combined on both channels.

"María" was released as the EP's second single on June 29, 2020. The music video was directed by Beomjin J of VM Project Architecture. The single debuted at number three on the Gaon Digital Chart, later peaking at number two, and at number six on the Billboard World Digital Song Sales chart. The music video, posted simultaneously to Mamamoo's YouTube channel and 1theK, has over 305 million views as of December 30, 2022.

== Commercial performance ==
María debuted and peaked at number five on the Gaon Album Chart for the 30th week of 2020. It placed at number 18 for the month of June, selling over 47,000 copies that month. The EP also debuted at number seven on the Billboard World Albums and 81 on Billboard Top Current Albums Sales charts for the week of July 11, 2020.

== Accolades ==
Year-end lists
Critic/Publication	List	Song	Rank	Ref.
MTV News	The Best K-POP B-sides of 2020	"LMM"	8	

== Track listing ==
María track listing
No.	Title	Lyrics	Music	Arrangement	Length
1.	"Intro: Nobody Else"	Park Woo-sang	Park Woo-sang	Park Woo-sang	1:57
2.	"María" (마리아)	Park Woo-sang; Hwasa	Park Woo-sang; Hwasa	Park Woo-sang	3:19
3.	"Kidding" (prod. Zico)	Kim Eana; Zico	Zico; Hwasa; Poptime	Zico; Poptime	2:45
4.	"Why"	Hwasa; Cosmic Sound; Cosmic Girl	Cosmic Sound; Cosmic Girl	Cosmic Sound; Cosmic Girl	3:21
5.	"I'm Bad Too" (featuring DPR Live)	Park Woo-sang; DPR Live	Park Woo-sang	Park Woo-sang	2:12
6.	"LMM"	Hwasa; Park Woo-sang	Hwasa; Park Woo-sang	Park Woo-sang	4:41
7.	"Twit" (멍청이)	Kim Dohoon; Park Woo-sang; Hwasa	Kim Dohoon; Park Woo-sang; Hwasa	Kim Dohoon; Park Woo-sang	3:10
Total length:					21:31

== Charts ==
=== Charts ===
Sales chart performance for María
Chart (2020)	Peak position
South Korean Albums (Gaon)	5
US Top Current Album Sales (Billboard)	81
US World Albums (Billboard)	7

== Release history ==
Release formats for María
Region	Date	Format	Label	Ref.
South Korea	June 29, 2020	CD, digital download, streaming	RBW	
Various	June 29, 2020	CD, digital download, streaming	RBW	
