= Twit (song) =

2019 debut single by Hwasa

Single by Hwasa

from the EP María
- Language: Korean
- Released: February 13, 2019
- Recorded: 2018–2019
- Genre: Tropical house; trap
- Length: 3:10
- Label: RBW
- Songwriters: Kim Do-hoon; Park Woo-sang; Hwasa
- Producers: Kim Do-hoon; Park Woo-sang; Hwasa

Hwasa singles chronology
"Cotton Candy" (2018)	"Twit" (2019)	"In the Fall" (2019)

Music video
- "Twit" on YouTube

"Twit" (Korean: 멍청이; RR: Meongcheongi; lit. 'dimwit') is the debut solo single by South Korean singer Hwasa. It was released on February 13, 2019 by RBW. Written by Kim Do-hoon, Park Woo-sang and Hwasa who are also the producers of the song. The music video has over 100 million views, making it the third most popular Korean music video by a female soloist in 2019.

== Composition ==
"Twit" was co-written and co-produced by Kim Do-hoon, Park Woo-sang and Hwasa. Tamar Herman from Billboard described the song as "a bouncing pop melody, which features chirpy trap beats and tropical house elements as the artist switches between chanting raps and her soaring, powerful vocals."

== Commercial performance ==
"Twit" peaked at number one on the South Korean digital, download and streaming chart and at number 3 on the Billboard US World Digital Songs chart. The song also debuted at number 22 on the New Zealand Hot Singles chart.

== Music video and promotion ==
The music video teaser was released on February 12, 2019. The official music video was released on February 13, 2019. It was directed by Park Sangwon. The dance practice video was released three days later on February 16. As of December 2022, it has received over 7.5 million views.

Hwasa performed the song on several music programs in South Korea including Show! Music Core, Music Bank, Inkigayo, and M Countdown. "Twit" later won first place at MBC's Show! Music Core on March 2 and March 16.

== Track listing ==
Download and streaming

- 1. "Twit" – 3:10
- 2. "Twit" (Instrumental) – 3:10

== Accolades ==
Year-end lists
Critic/Publication	List	Rank	Ref.
Billboard	The 25 Best K-pop Songs of 2019	8	
Refinery29	The Best K-pop Songs of 2019	13	
Rolling Stone India	10 Best K-pop Music Videos of 2019	—N/a	

=== Awards and nominations ===
Year	Award	Category	Result	Ref.
2020	9th Gaon Chart Music Awards	Song of the Year – February	Won	

=== Music program awards ===
Program	Date	Ref.
Show! Music Core	March 2, 2019	
Show! Music Core	March 16, 2019	

== Charts ==
=== Weekly charts ===
Weekly chart performance
Chart (2019)	Peak position
New Zealand Hot Singles (RMNZ)	22
South Korea (Gaon)	1
South Korea (K-pop Hot 100)	1
US World Digital Song Sales (Billboard)	3

=== Monthly charts ===
Monthly chart performance
Chart (2019)	Peak position
South Korea (Gaon)	4

=== Year-end charts ===
Year-end chart performance
Chart (2019)	Position
South Korea (Gaon)	30

Year-end chart performance
Chart (2020)	Position
South Korea Download (Gaon)	185

== Release history ==
Region	Date	Format	Label
Various	February 13, 2019	Digital download, streaming	RBW

== See also ==
- List of Gaon Digital Chart number ones of 2019
- List of K-pop Hot 100 number ones
