= Good Goodbye (Hwasa song) =

2025 single by Hwasa

Single by Hwasa
- Language: Korean; English
- Released: October 15, 2025
- Length: 3:43
- Label: P Nation
- Composers: Hwasa; Park Woo-sang
- Lyricists: Hwasa; An Shin-ae

Hwasa singles chronology
"Star" (2024)	"Good Goodbye" (2025)	"So Cute" (2026)

Music video
- "Good Goodbye" on YouTube

"Good Goodbye" is a song by South Korean singer Hwasa. It was written and composed by Hwasa alongside An Shin-ae and Park Woo-sang, and it was released as a digital single on October 15, 2025 through P Nation. A music video for the song was released the same day, starring actor Park Jeong‑min.

Hwasa and Park performed the song together at the 46th Blue Dragon Film Awards, which has been attributed for its surge in popularity. In November, 36 days after its release, it achieved its first real time all-kill (RAK) and on November 30, 2025, it achieved a perfect all-kill (PAK), topping all South Korean charts simultaneously. It went on to top both the weekly and monthly charts on South Korea’s Circle Digital Chart. In January 2026, it became the song with the second-most PAKs of all time, behind Huntrix's "Golden", and the song with the most PAKs by a soloist.

== Background ==
"Good Goodbye" was announced by P Nation on October 2, 2025, set for release on October 15. It was released as a digital single, alongside an orchestral version of the track featuring South Korean string quartet Duomo.

The song was written by Hwasa alongside P Nation labelmate An Shin-ae, and composed by Hwasa with Park Woo-sang.

== Music video ==
The music video stars Hwasa alongside actor Park Jeong‑min. In it, the pair share scenes at the beach in a happy relationship, contrasted with Hwasa in a car with luggage to symbolise the couple's separation. It was directed by Yeom Woojin.

== Live performances ==
Hwasa first performed "Good Goodbye" at M Countdown on October 16. She continued performances on South Korean music programs until finally performing on Music Bank on October 24. On the October 17 broadcast of Music Bank, she was joined by fellow Mamamoo member Wheein for the performance.

Park Jeong-min joined her performance at the 46th Blue Dragon Film Awards on November 20, and the pair recreated scenes from the song's music video. Their performance was regarded as a highlight of the ceremony, and has been attributed for the song's surge in popularity.

== Critical reception ==
Year-end lists
Critic/Publication	List	Rank	Ref.
Genius Korea	Best K-pop Songs 2025	7	
The Hollywood Reporter	40 Best K-Pop Songs of 2025	8	
Rolling Stone India	The 25 Best K-Pop Songs of 2025	-	
Paste Magazine	The 20 Best K-pop songs of 2025	1	
Billboard	The 25 Best K-pop Songs of 2025: Staff Picks	3	

== Accolades ==
Awards and nominations
Year	Award	Category	Result	Ref.
2026	Korean Music Awards	Best Pop Song	Nominated	
2026	KM Chart World 2025 SEASONBEST Winter	Best K-Music	Won	
2026	KM Chart Awards (Note: Winners of KM Chart Awards 2026 are being announced in conjunction with the annual South Korean music award ceremony that takes place today in the Hwajeong Tiger Dome, Korea University, Seoul on July 25, 2026. The event has officially commenced, and the first set of winners has already been announced. Recognising the most significant successes of K-pop in the past year, the annual event has brought together some of the greatest artists of the industry, upcoming rookies, and even fans’ favourite acts.)	Song Of The Year (Daesang)	Won	
2026	K-World Dream Awards	Best Digital Music Artists	Won	

Music program awards
Program	Date	Ref.
Inkigayo	December 7, 2025	
Inkigayo	January 11, 2026	
Inkigayo	January 18, 2026	
Show! Music Core	December 6, 2025	
Show! Music Core	December 13, 2025	

== Charts ==
=== Weekly charts ===
List of weekly chart positions
Chart (2025–2026)	Peak position
Global 200 (Billboard)	32
Hong Kong (Billboard)	4
Japan Download Songs (Billboard Japan)	65
Malaysia (IFPI)	7
New Zealand Hot Singles (RMNZ)	26
Singapore (RIAS)	4
South Korea (Circle)	1
South Korea Hot 100 (Billboard)	1
Taiwan (Billboard)	1
Thailand (IFPI)	5
US World Digital Song Sales (Billboard)	1
Vietnam Hot 100 (Billboard)	51

=== Monthly charts ===
List of monthly chart positions
Chart (2025)	Position
South Korea (Circle)	1

=== Year-end charts ===
List of year-end chart positions
Chart (2025)	Position
South Korea (Circle)	77
