= List of Super Junior live performances =

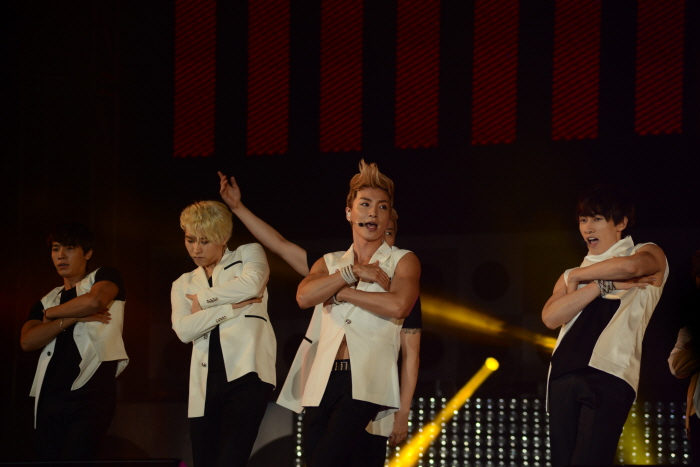
Super Junior at the Expo 2012

Super Junior, a South Korean boyband, has headlined eleven concert tours to support their albums and gone on multiple world tours as a member of the musical collective SMTown. The band has also performed as supporting acts for TVXQ, Kangta & Vanness, and Kangta in their respective headlining tours. Super Junior appeared as a special guest at the Bangkok stop of TVXQ's Rising Sun Tour in 2006. After the performance, they announced they will hold a tour after the released of their upcoming second album. The aforementioned album Don't Don was released in September 2007, and the band embarked on their first tour, Super Show, in February 2008.

They performed their 100th headlining concert on September 21, 2014, during the tour Super Show 6. Their 200th concert was held on September 13, 2025, at the Jakarta stop of Super Show 10. The concert series surpassed 2 million cumulative audiences in 2018, and 3.3 million in 2024.

== Headlining tours ==
Tours summary
Title	Dates	Associated album(s)	Continent(s) / Region(s)	Shows	Attendance	Ref.
Super Show	February 22, 2008 – March 7, 2009	Twins and Don't Don	Asia	10	86,000	
Super Show 2	July 17, 2009 – April 10, 2010	Sorry, Sorry	Asia	15	198,000	
Super Show 3	August 14, 2010 – May 17, 2011	Bonamana	Asia	20	200,000	
Super Show 4	November 19, 2011 – May 27, 2012	Mr. Simple and A-Cha	Asia, Europe	24	400,000	
Super Show 5	March 23, 2013 – February 22, 2014	Sexy, Free & Single and Spy	Asia, Latin America, Europe	28	450,000	
Super Show 6	September 19, 2014 – July 12, 2015	Mamacita and This Is Love	Asia	22	—N/a	
Super Camp	September 19, 2015 – July 5, 2016	Devil	Asia, Latin America	14	—N/a	
Super Show 7	December 15, 2017 – July 12, 2019	Play, Replay and One More Time	Asia, Latin America	21	—N/a	
Super Show 8: Infinite Time	October 12, 2019 – February 16, 2020	Time Slip	Asia	16	160,000	
Super Show 9: Road	July 15, 2022 – April 16, 2023	The Renaissance and The Road	Asia, Latin America	25	—N/a	
Super Show Spin-off: Halftime	June 22, 2024 – September 14, 2024	Various	Asia	13	—N/a	
Super Show 10	August 22, 2025 – April 5, 2026	Super Junior25	Asia, Latin America	33	—N/a	

=== Super Camp (2015–2016) ===
After the release of Devil in July 2015, Super Junior announced they will be holding a mini concert in celebration of the boy band's tenth anniversary. The concert, entitled Super Camp, will also served as some of the members' final performance as a group before they fulfill their mandatory military service. Nine members of Super Junior participated in the concert, namely Leeteuk, Heechul, Yesung, Kangin, Eunhyuk, Donghae, Siwon, Ryeowook and Kyuhyun. The latter five were set to enlist in the next two years.

The concert was firstly held at the Hwajung Gymnasium, Korea University, Seoul on September 19, 2015. The boy band performed 15 songs consisted of their previous hit singles and new songs from Devil and its repackaged edition, Magic. Shortly after, Eunhyuk, Donghae and Siwon enlisted in the military; Eunhyuk as an active-duty soldier, Donghae and Siwon as conscripted police officers.

Down to six members, the mini concert was then brought to Tokyo in January 2016. The setlist was also scaled down to seven songs. Super Camp then evolved into a full-blown tour, making stops in New Taipei City, Beijing, Shanghai, Bangkok, Macau, Osaka, Monterrey, and Mexico City. Additional performances were also scheduled to be held in New York City, Los Angeles, and Santiago but they were cancelled after Kangin was caught and booked for drunk driving in May 2016. Ryeowook who was set to enlist a few days after the Osaka performance in June 2016 had to postpone his military enlistment to fill in the gap left by Kangin. He joined the rest of the members on the final leg of the tour in Mexico in July 2016. Following the end of the tour, he enlisted as an active-duty soldier on October 11, 2016.

Concert dates for Super Camp
Date	City	Country	Venue	Attendance
September 19, 2015	Seoul	South Korea	Hwajung Gymnasium, Korea University	—N/a
January 8–10, 2016	Tokyo	Japan	Ariake Coliseum	40,000
February 13–14, 2016	New Taipei City	Taiwan	Xinzhuang Gymnasium	—N/a
February 27, 2016	Beijing	China	Workers' Stadium	—N/a
March 5, 2016	Shanghai	China	Shanghai Grand Stage	—N/a
March 19, 2016	Bangkok	Thailand	Thunderdome Stadium	—N/a
May 28, 2016	Macau	China	Studio City Event Center	—N/a
June 10–11, 2016	Osaka	Japan	Intex Osaka	—N/a
July 3, 2016	Monterrey	Mexico	Arena Monterrey	—N/a
July 5, 2016	Mexico City	Mexico	Arena Ciudad de México	9,500

=== Super Show Spin-Off: Halftime (2024) ===
Super Show Spin-Off: Halftime is a 2024 Asian tour by Super Junior. The tour served as a build-up to their upcoming 20th debut anniversary. The tour combined the concepts of an alternate reality version of Super Junior, inspired by the animated television series What If...?, and the Super Bowl halftime performance.

Super Junior first announced the tour in January 2024, and its full schedule in April. The band later added an additional date in Taipei due to fans demand, bringing up the number of shows to 13. Ahead of the start of the tour in June, the boy band released the single "Show Time". The short tour started at KSPO Dome in Seoul on June 22, 2024, and ended at Jakarta's Beach City International Stadium on September 14, 2024.

Unlike the band's regular tour, the Spin-Off tour's setlist consisted of fans' favorite songs instead of songs from their latest album. The following setlist was performed at the final show in Jakarta on September 14, 2024. It is not intended to represent all shows throughout the tour.

==== Set list ====
===== Act 1 =====
1. "Show Time"
2. "Wonder Boy"
3. "Dancing Out"
4. "Don't Wait"
5. "Runaway"

===== Act 2 =====
6. "Suit Up" (LED - Leeteuk, Eunhyuk, and Donghae)
7. "Let's Not" (SKY - Shindong, Kyuhyun, and Yesung)
8. "Danger" (RS - Ryeowook and Siwon)

===== Act 3 =====
9. "It Has to be You" (Group Version)
10. "At Gwanghwamun" (Group Version)
11. "The Little Prince" (Group Version)
12. "The One I Love" (Group Version)

===== Act 4 =====
13. "Get a Guitar" (Riize cover by Leeteuk, Yesung and Donghae)
14. "Hype Boy" (NewJeans cover by Shindong, Eunhyuk, Donghae, Ryeowook and Kyuhyun)

===== Act 5 =====
15. "(Introductory Performance by Siwon) + Spy" (Without Siwon)
16. "Opera" (Siwon is only present in the first verse)
17. "Lovely Day"
18. "From U"
19. "Devil"
20. "Black Suit"

===== Encore =====
21. "A Man in Love"
22. "Sorry, Sorry"
23. "Believe"

===== Notes =====
1. Siwon didn't perform SPY with the group.
2. In Opera, Siwon is only present in the first verse. After singing his first line as he was the one who started the song, he left. He returned after.

Concert dates for Super Show Spin-Off: Halftime
Date	City	Country	Venue	Attendance
June 22–23, 2024	Seoul	South Korea	KSPO Dome	18,000
July 6–7, 2024	Bangkok	Thailand	Impact Challenger Hall 1	—N/a
July 14, 2024	—N/a	Singapore	Singapore Indoor Stadium	7,000
July 28, 2024	Ho Chi Minh City	Vietnam	Phu Tho Indoor Stadium	—N/a
August 3, 2024	Kuala Lumpur	Malaysia	Axiata Arena	9,000
August 16–18, 2024	Taipei	Taiwan	Taipei Arena	25,500
September 6–7, 2024	Hong Kong	China	AsiaWorld-Expo Arena	—N/a
September 14, 2024	Jakarta	Indonesia	Beach City International Stadium	—N/a

== Other tours ==
=== As a supporting act ===
List of concert tours as supporting acts, showing dates and headlining artist(s)
Title	Headlining artist(s)	Date	Location	Venue	Performed song(s)	Ref.
Rising Sun 1st Asia Tour	TVXQ	July 14, 2006	Kuala Lumpur, Malaysia	Putra Indoor Stadium	"Twins"; "Chageunchageun"; "Miracle"; "So I"; "U"; "Show Me Your Love"	
Rising Sun 1st Asia Tour	TVXQ	September 15, 2006	Bangkok, Thailand	Impact Arena	"Twins"; "Miracle"; "U"	
Creating a Scandal	Kangta & Vanness	September 22–23, 2006	Beijing, China	Great Hall of the People	"Dancing Out"; "Miracle"; "U"	
O: The 2nd Asia Tour	TVXQ	October 26–28, 2007	Seoul, South Korea	Olympic Gymnastics Arena		
Kangta Asia Tour 2010 in Beijing	Kangta	July 24, 2010	Beijing, China	Wukesong Gymnasium	"We are the Future"	

=== As a member of SMTown ===
List of SMTown concert tours participated by Super Junior, showing dates, locations and relevant details
Title	Date	Location	Venue	Performed song(s)	Attendance	Ref.
SMTown Summer Concert	June 23, 2007	Busan, South Korea	BEXCO			
SMTown Summer Concert	June 30 – July 1, 2007	Seoul, South Korea	Olympic Gymnastics Arena			
SMTown Summer Concert	July 7, 2007	Daegu, South Korea	Daegu World Cup Stadium			
SMTown Live '08	August 15, 2008	Seoul, South Korea	Jamsil Sports Complex	"Pajama Party" (H); "Midnight Fantasy"; "Our Love"; "Song For You"; "Twins"; "Don't Don"; "Galjeung"; "Hot Mail" (with SMTown); "Red Sun" (with SMTown)	45,000	
SMTown Live '08	September 13, 2008	Shanghai, China	Shanghai Stadium	"U" (M); "Me (M); "Ài Nǐ Ài Nǐ" (M); "Don't Don"	40,000	
SMTown Live '08	February 7, 2009	Bangkok, Thailand	Rajamangala National Stadium	"U"	40,000	
SMTown Live '10 World Tour	August 21, 2010	Seoul, South Korea	Jamsil Olympic Stadium	"No Other"; "Bonamana"; "Super Girl"; "Rokkugo"; "No. 1" (with Shinee and f(x))	35,000	
SMTown Live '10 World Tour	September 5, 2010	Los Angeles, United States	Staples Center	"No Other"; "Sorry, Sorry"; "Bonamana"; "U"; "Hope" (with SMTown)	15,000	
SMTown Live '10 World Tour	September 11, 2010	Shanghai, China	Hongkou Stadium		25,000	
SMTown Live '10 World Tour	January 25–26, 2011	Tokyo, Japan	Yoyogi National Stadium		24,000	
SMTown Live '10 World Tour	June 10–11, 2011	Paris, France	Le Zénith de Paris		14,000	
SMTown Live '10 World Tour	September 2–4, 2011	Tokyo, Japan	Tokyo Dome	"Sorry, Sorry"; "Mr. Simple"; "Sorry, Sorry–Answer" (K.R.Y.)	150,000	
SMTown Live '10 World Tour	October 23, 2011	New York City, United States	Madison Square Garden	"Mr. Simple"; "Bonamana"; "Sorry, Sorry–Answer"	15,000	
SMTown Live World Tour III	June 9, 2012	Zhubei, Taiwan	Hsinchu County Stadium		30,000	
SMTown Live World Tour III	August 4–5, 2012	Tokyo, Japan	Tokyo Dome		100,000	
SMTown Live World Tour III	August 18, 2012	Seoul, South Korea	Jamsil Olympic Stadium	"Oops! (ft. f(x)"; "Superman"; "Don't Don"; "Bonamana"; "Sorry, Sorry"; "A-Cha"; "Dancing Out"; "Sexy, Free & Single"; "Hope (with SMTown)"	40,000	
SMTown Live World Tour III	September 22, 2012	Jakarta, Indonesia	Gelora Bung Karno Stadium			
SMTown Live World Tour III	November 23, 2012	Marina Bay, Singapore	The Float @ Marina Bay	"Oppa, Oppa" (Donghae & Eunhyuk); "Superman"; "Sorry, Sorry"; "Sexy, Free & Single"; "Hope (with SMTown)"	26,000	
SMTown Live World Tour III	November 25, 2012	Bangkok, Thailand	SCG Stadium		23,000	
SMTown Live World Tour III	October 19, 2013	Beijing, China	Bird Nest	"Superman"; "Sorry, Sorry"	70,000	
SMTown Live World Tour III	October 26–27, 2013	Tokyo, Japan	Tokyo Dome		100,000	
SMTown Live World Tour IV	August 15, 2014	Seoul, South Korea	Seoul World Cup Stadium	"Sorry, Sorry"; "Mr. Simple"; "Shining Star"	35,000	
SMTown Live World Tour IV	October 4–5, 2014	Tokyo, Japan	Ajinomoto Stadium		120,000	
SMTown Live World Tour IV	October 18, 2014	Shanghai, China	Shanghai Stadium		30,000	
SMTown Live World Tour IV	March 21, 2015	Zhubei, Taiwan	Hsinchu County Stadium			
SMTown Live World Tour IV	July 5–6, 2015	Tokyo, Japan	Tokyo Dome		100,000	
SMTown Live World Tour IV	July 25–26, 2015	Osaka, Japan	Kyocera Dome	"Devil"	90,000	
SMTown Live World Tour V in Japan	July 16–17, 2016	Osaka, Japan	Kyocera Dome		90,000	
SMTown Live World Tour V in Japan	August 13–14, 2016	Tokyo, Japan	Tokyo Dome		90,000	
SMTown Live World Tour VI	July 8, 2017	Seoul, South Korea	Seoul World Cup Stadium	"Sorry, Sorry"; "Bonamana"; "Magic"	45,000	
SMTown Live World Tour VI	July 15–16, 2017	Osaka, Japan	Kyocera Dome		90,000	
SMTown Live World Tour VI	July 27–28, 2017	Tokyo, Japan	Tokyo Dome	"Sorry, Sorry"; "Bonamana"; "Magic"; "Devil"	100,000	
SMTown Live World Tour VI	April 6, 2018	Dubai, UAE	Autism Rocks Arena		15,000	
SMTown Live 2018	July 28—30, 2018	Osaka, Japan	Kyocera Dome	"Bonamana"; "Lo Siento" (ft. Irene)	120,000	
SMTown Special Stage	January 18–19, 2019	Santiago, Chile	Estadio Nacional	"One More Time (Otra Vez)" (SJ ver.); "Lo Siento (ft. Irene)"; "Ahora Te Puedes Marchar"	35,000	
SMTown Live 2019	August 3—5, 2019	Tokyo, Japan	Tokyo Dome	"Oppa, Oppa" (D&E); "Can You Feel It" (D&E); "Black Suit"; "U"; "Sorry, Sorry"; "Hope (with SMTown)"	150,000	
SMTown Live Culture Humanity	January 1, 2021	Kwangya (Online)	—	"Super Clap"; "2YA2YAO!"; "Burn The Floor"	35,830,000	
SMTown Live 2022: SMCU Express	January 1, 2022	Kwangya (Online)	—	"The Crown"; "Burn The Floor"; "Black Suit"; "Mamacita"; "Devil"; "House Party"	51,000,000	
SMTown Live 2022: SMCU Express	August 20, 2022	Suwon, South Korea	Suwon World Cup Stadium	"Black Suit"; "Sorry, Sorry"; "Bonamana"; "Don't Wait"; "Mango"	30,000	
SMTown Live 2022: SMCU Express	August 27—29, 2022	Tokyo, Japan	Tokyo Dome	"Sorry, Sorry"; "Bonamana"; "Bambina"; "Black Suit"; "Hope from Kwangya (with SMTown)"	150,000	
SMTown Live 2023: SMCU Palace	January 1, 2023	Kwangya (Online)	—	"Celebrate"; "Black Suit"; "Sorry, Sorry"; "Mango"; "Mr. Simple"; "Hope from Kwangya (with SMTown)"		
SMTown Live 2023: SMCU Palace	September 23, 2023	Jakarta, Indonesia	Gelora Bung Karno Main Stadium	"Black Suit"; "Mamacita"; "Mr. Simple"; "Bonamana"; "Sorry, Sorry"; "Hope (with SMTown)"	50,000	
SMTown Live 2024: SMCU Palace	February 21–22, 2024	Tokyo, Japan	Tokyo Dome	"U" (with NCT Wish; "Sorry, Sorry"; "Bonamana"; "Black Suit"; "Hope from Kwangya" (with SMTown)	95,000	
SMTown Live 2025: The Culture, the Future	January 11–12, 2025	Seoul, South Korea	Gocheok Sky Dome	"A Man In Love"; "Sorry, Sorry"; "Black Suit"; "Devil"; "Show Me Your Love" (with TVXQ, Exo's Suho and Chanyeol, NCT's Johnny, Kun, Ten, Jungwoo, Chenle, Ryo, Sakuya, and Riize's Eunseok); "I Pray 4 U"	40,000	
SMTown Live 2025: The Culture, the Future	May 9, 2025	Mexico City, Mexico	Estadio GNP Seguros	"Mamacita (Ayaya)"; "Sorry, Sorry"; "Black Suit"; "Hope from Kwangya (with SMTown)"	50,000	
SMTown Live 2025: The Culture, the Future	May 11, 2025	Carson, California, United States	Dignity Health Sports Park			
SMTown Live 2025: The Culture, the Future	August 9–10, 2025	Tokyo, Japan	Tokyo Dome	"Sorry, Sorry"; "Black Suit"; "Express Mode"; "Hope" (with SMTown)	95,000	
SMTown Live 2025: The Culture, the Future	January 31–February 1, 2026	Fukuoka, Japan	Mizuho PayPay Dome Fukuoka	"Mr. Simple"; "Bonamana"; "Sorry, Sorry"; "Express Mode"; "Hope" (with SMTown)	70,000	

== One-off concerts ==
Title	Date	Location	Venue	Performed song(s)	Attendance	Ref.
Super Junior Marry U	December 15, 2007 (Note: 2 shows)	Seoul, South Korea	Shindorim Techno Mart Concert Grand Hall	"Don't Don"; "Marry U"	1,500	
Super Junior Premium Live in Japan	August 1–2, 2009	Tokyo, Japan	Tokyo International Forum	"A Man in Love"; "U"; "It's You"; "She Wants It"; "Angela"; "Disco Drive"; "Dancing Out"; "What If" (K.R.Y. ft. Sungmin); "Heartquake" (K.R.Y. ft. Eunhyuk); "Zhishao hai you ni" (M); "Me" (M); "Our Love"; "Shining Star"; "Rokkugo" (T); "Twins"; "Don't Don"; "Sorry, Sorry"; "Sapphire Blue"; "Marry U (Japanese ver.)"; "Wonder Boy"	15,000	
SMTown Week Super Junior Treasure Island	December 28–29, 2013	Seoul, South Korea	KINTEX Exhibition Hall 1	"Blue World"; "Me"; "Sexy, Free & Single"; "Bonamana"; "Sorry, Sorry"; "Miracle"; "Oppa, Oppa"; "Rockstar"; "Storm"; "My All Is In You"; "Haengbok"; "White Christmas"; "First Snow"		
Super Junior Special Mini Album One More Time MV Showcase	October 8, 2018	Macau, China	MGM Theater, MGM Cotai	"Black Suit"; "One More Chance"; "Sorry, Sorry"; "One More Time (Otra Vez)" (SJ ver.)	2000	
Beyond the Super Show	May 31, 2020	Online	—	"Superman"; "2YA2YAO!"; "U"; "Sexy, Free & Single"; "Mr. Simple"; "Home" (K.R.Y.); "Heads Up"; "Devil"; "Super Clap"; "'Bout You" + "Oppa, Oppa" (D&E); "Mamacita" + "Black Suit"; "Sorry, Sorry"; "Runaway"; "Shining Star"	123,000	
Super Junior Japan Special Event 2022: Return of the King	April 2—4, 2022	Saitama, Japan	Saitama Super Arena	"Superman"; "Black Suit"; "House Party"; "Devil"; "One More Chance"; "Lunar Eclipse"; "Callin'"; "Sunrise" + "B.A.D"+ "Oppa, Oppa" (D&E); "You & I"; "Wow! Wow!! Wow!!!"; "Bambina"	45,000	
Super Junior Japan Special Event 2024: Blue World	January 20–21, 2024	Saitama, Japan	Saitama Super Arena	"U"; Black Suit"; "House Party"; "Celebrate"; "Shattā Shimero"; "Oppa, Oppa"; "Dorothy"; "Devil"; "2YAO2YAO!"; "Mr.Simple"; "Sorry, Sorry"; "Way"; "Bambina"	50,000	

== Fanmeeting concerts ==
List of fanmeeting concerts held by Super Junior
Title	Date	Location	Venue	Performed song(s)	Attendance	Ref.
The First–Super Junior Music & Talk	March 25, 2006	Seoul, South Korea	600th Anniversary Hall, Sungkyunkwan University	"Miracle"; "Twins (Knockout)"; "Way for Love"	700	
Super Junior 1st Premium Event in Japan	July 8, 2008	Tokyo, Japan	Nippon Budokan	"Twins"; "Miracle"; "Rokkugo" (T); "Ayumi o Tomete" (K.R.Y.); "U" (Korean ver.); "A Man In Love"	12,000	
Super Junior E.L.F. 2nd fan meeting	May 23, 2010	Seoul, South Korea	Olympic Hall, Seoul Olympic Park	"Bonamana"; "Boom Boom"; "Coagulation"; "In My Dream"; "Good Person"; "It Has To Be You" (Yesung solo); "Sonata of Temptation"; "Chu~"		
E.L.F-Japan Fanmeeting 2012	August 24, 2012 (Note: 2 shows)	Yokohama, Japan	Yokohama Akarenga Park	"Sexy, Free & Single"; "Spy"; "Our Love"	34,000	
Super Junior 15th Anniversary Special Event: Invitation	November 7, 2020	Online	—	"Miracle"; "U"; "Sorry, Sorry"; "Bonamana"; "Mr. Simple"; "From U"; "Evanesce"; "This Is Love"; "Devil"; "One More Chance"; "Super Clap"; "The Melody"		
ELF-Japan 10th Anniversary: The Super Blue Party	April 25, 2021	Online	—	"Burn The Floor"; "U"; "Sorry, Sorry"; "Devil"; "Phantom Pain" (Yesung solo); "Traveler" (K.R.Y); "Wings" (D&E); "House Party"; "Star"		
Super Junior Fan Party in Macau	June 10, 2023	Macau, China	Galaxy Macau	"House Party"; "Devil"; "Sorry, Sorry"; "Black Suit"; "Miracle"	10,000	
2023 Super Junior Fan Party in Manila	July 21, 2023	Quezon City, Philippines	Araneta Coliseum	"Super"; "Mr. Simple"; "Black Suit"; "Everyday"; "My Wish"; "Callin'"; "House Party"; "Devil"; "2YA2YAO!"; "Sorry, Sorry"; "Bonamana"; "More Days With You"; "Miracle"		
Lotte Duty Free Shop Fan Event with Super Junior	August 12, 2023	Seoul, South Korea	ROUN Atrium Art Hall	"Devil"; "Callin'"; "House Party"		
Super Junior 18th Anniversary Special Event: 1ts 8lue	November 4, 2023	Seoul, South Korea	Peace Hall, Kyung Hee University	"Devil"; "House Party"; "Black Suit"; "U"; "Disco Drive"; "Mamacita"; "Sorry, Sorry"; "Miracle"; "Celebrate"; "From U"		
Super Junior Fan Party in Kaohsiung	January 27–28, 2024	Kaohsiung, Taiwan	Kaohsiung Arena	"Super"; "Mr. Simple"; "Black Suit"; "Devil"; "Sorry, Sorry"; "Bonamana"	20,000	

== Festivals ==
=== Music festivals ===
Live performances in music festivals
Event	Date	Location	Venue	Performed song(s)	Attendance	Ref.
2005 Mnet KM Music Video Festival	November 27, 2005	Seoul, South Korea	Olympic Gymnastics Arena			
The Grand Pattaya International Music Festival 2006	March 18, 2006	Pattaya, Thailand	Pattaya beach	"Twins"; "Miracle"; "You Are The One"; "Chageun Chageun"; "So I"	15,000	
Mnet Hi Seoul Music Festival	May 4, 2006	Seoul, South Korea	N Seoul Tower			
Saranghanda Daehan Minguk i-Concert (Note: 2006 edition of Dream Concert)	May 27, 2006	Seoul, South Korea	Jamsil Olympic Stadium	"U"; "Miracle"; "Reds Go Together" (with various artists)	30,000	
MTV Live Wow Special u-Clean Concert – A warm digital world	June 3, 2006	Seoul, South Korea	Olympic Park, Seoul		7,000	
2006 Ulsan Summer Festival	July 26, 2006	Ulsan, South Korea	Munsu Stadium Lakeside Plaza	"U"		
2006 Korea Music Festival	August 18, 2006	Sokcho, South Korea	Cheongchoho Lake	"Dancing Out"; "U"	10,000	
Gwangju Youth Music Festival	August 19, 2006	Gwangju, South Korea	Gwangju City Hall			
2006 Mnet KM Music Festival	November 25, 2006	Seoul, South Korea	Olympic Park Gymnastics Stadium	"U"; "Miracle"; "Don't Go Away" (Note: Originally by Chu Ga-yeoul)	6,000	
2006 Hallyu Drama Festival	December 3, 2006	Goyang, South Korea	KINTEX		4,500	
SBS Gayo Daejeon	December 29, 2006	Goyang, South Korea	KINTEX			
KBS Song Festival	December 30, 2006	Seoul, South Korea	KBS Hall			
MBC Gayo Daejejeon	December 31, 2006	Paju, South Korea	Imjingak Pyeonghwa-Nuri Outdoor Stage	"U"		
5th Korean Music Festival	May 5, 2007	Los Angeles, United States	Hollywood Bowl		20,000	
Saranghanda Daehan Minguk 2007 Dream Concert	June 9, 2007	Seoul, South Korea	Seoul Olympic Stadium	"U"; "Twins (Knockout)"	40,000	
Ultimate Fiesta	July 14, 2007	Bangkok, Thailand	Royal City Avenue	"U"; "Dancing Out"; "Haengbok"		
2007 Ulsan Summer Festival	July 25, 2007	Ulsan, South Korea	Munsu Stadium Lakeside Plaza	"U"; "Miracle"; "Haengbok"		
Asia Song Festival	September 22, 2007	Seoul, South Korea	Sangam World Cup Stadium	"Don't Don"	30,000	
2007 MBC Campus Song Festival	October 6, 2007	Cheonan, South Korea	Dankook University			
2007 Mnet KM Music Festival	November 17, 2007	Seoul, South Korea	Jamsil Indoor Stadium			
SBS Gayo Daejeon	December 29, 2007	Seoul, South Korea	Jangchung Gymnasium	"Haengbok"; "Hug" (with Girls' Generation)		
KBS Song Festival	December 30, 2007	Seoul, South Korea	KBS Hall	"Story of Last Night" (Note: Originally by Sobangcha); "She Was Pretty" (Note: Originally by Park Jin-young); "U"		
Saranghanda Daehan Minguk 2008 Dream Concert	June 7, 2008	Seoul, South Korea	Jamsil Olympic Stadium	"A Man in Love"; "Don't Don"	50,000	
Korea–Japan Pop Festival 2008	December 12, 2008	Tokyo, Japan	C.C. Lemon Hall	"Cooking Cooking" (Happy); "Pajama Party" (Happy); "Don't Go Away" (T); "First Express" (T); "Rokkugo" (T)	2,000	
6th Youth Music Festival	May 16, 2009	Dongducheon, South Korea	Dongducheon Sports Complex		4,000	
Incheon Korean Music Wave 2009	September 5, 2009	Incheon, South Korea	Incheon Munhak Stadium	"Sorry, Sorry"		
6th Asia Song Festival	September 19, 2009	Seoul, South Korea	Seoul World Cup Stadium	"It's You"; "Sorry, Sorry"; "Seoul (with Girls' Generation)"	40,000	
2009 Dream Concert	October 10, 2009	Seoul, South Korea	Seoul World Cup Stadium	"Super Girl" (Korean ver.) (M); "Sorry, Sorry"; "It's You"; "Yeohaengeul Tteonayo" (with Girls' Generation and Shinee)	40,000	
SBS Gayo Daejeon	December 29, 2009	Goyang, South Korea	KINTEX	"Gee" (with Shinee); "Billie Jean" (dance cover); "Beat It" (dance cover with 2PM, Beast, and MBLAQ)		
KBS Song Festival	December 30, 2009	Seoul, South Korea	KBS Hall	"Accidental Encounter" (Note: Originally by Songgolmae); "Smooth Criminal" (dance cover with Girls' Generation and Shinee); "Ben" (with Kara)		
MBC Gayo Daejejeon	December 31, 2009	Ilsan, South Korea	MBC Dream Center			
Dream Concert	May 22, 2010	Seoul, South Korea	Seoul World Cup Stadium	"Bonamana"; "Sorry, Sorry"	45,000	
Korea Music Festival at Expo 2010 Shanghai	May 30, 2010	Shanghai, China	Shanghai Expo Cultural Park	"A Man in Love"; "Sorry, Sorry"; "Bonamana"	10,000	
2010 Ulsan Summer Festival	July 28, 2010	Ulsan, South Korea	Taehwagang Grand Park	"No Other"; "It Has To Be You" (Yesung solo); "Bonamana"		
Incheon Korean Music Wave 2010	August 29, 2010	Incheon, South Korea	Incheon Munhak Stadium	"No Other"; "Bonamana"; "Sorry, Sorry"	50,000	
Hallyu Dream Concert	September 12, 2010	Gyeongju, South Korea	Gyeongju Civic Stadium	"Sorry, Sorry"; "Bonamana"	15,000	
SBS Gayo Daejeon	December 29, 2010	Goyang, South Korea	KINTEX	"Bonamana"		
KBS Song Festival	December 30, 2010	Seoul, South Korea	KBS Hall	"Bonamana"		
MBC Gayo Daejejeon	December 31, 2010	Ilsan, South Korea	MBC Dream Center			
Incheon Korean Music Wave 2011	August 13, 2011	Incheon, South Korea	Incheon Munhak Stadium	"Sorry, Sorry"; "Mr. Simple"	40,000	
Three Kingdoms Performing Arts: China, Japan and Korea Music Festival (Fengyun Shengdian) (Note: Chinese: 三国演艺：中日韩风云音乐盛典)	September 25, 2011	Beijing, China	Bird's Nest	"Sorry, Sorry"	60,000	
Asia Song Festival	October 15, 2011	Daegu, South Korea	Daegu World Cup Stadium	"Superman"; "A-cha"; "Mr. Simple"; "Sorry, Sorry"	40,000	
SBS Gayo Daejeon	December 29, 2011	Goyang, South Korea	KINTEX	"Mr. Simple"		
KBS Song Festival	December 30, 2011	Seoul, South Korea	KBS Hall	"Mr. Simple"		
MBC Gayo Daejejeon	December 31, 2011	Gwangmyeong, South Korea	Gwangmyeong Speedom	"Bonamana" (Rock ver.); "Mr. Simple"		
MBC Music Festival	January 31, 2012	Seoul, South Korea	Olympic Hall	"Superman"; "Mr. Simple"	3,500	
Vietnam-Korea Festival	March 15, 2012	Hanoi, Vietnam	National Convention Center	"Superman"; "Mr. Simple"; "Memories"; "Sorry, Sorry"	3,500	
Expo Pop Festival at the Expo 2012	July 21, 2012	Yeosu, South Korea	Yeosu Expo Pavilion		40,000	
2012 Ulsan Summer Festival (Note: Also aired as Show! Music Core 10th anniversary special episode)	July 23, 2012	Ulsan, South Korea	Ulsan Sports Complex Auxiliary Stadium	"Mr. Simple"; "Sexy, Free & Single"		
a-nation 2012 stadium fes	August 25, 2012	Tokyo, Japan	Ajinomoto Stadium	"Opera" (Japanese ver.); "Mr. Simple" (Japanese ver.); "Sorry, Sorry"; "Bijin (Bonamana)"; "Sexy, Free & Single" (Japanese ver.)	54,000	
2012 Gangnam Festival K-Pop Concert	October 7, 2012	Seoul, South Korea	COEX			
K-Pop Festival Music Bank in Chile	November 2, 2012	Viña del Mar, Chile	Quinta Vergara Amphitheater	"Sexy, Free & Single"; "Mr. Simple"; "Bonamana"; "Sorry, Sorry"	10,000	
KBS Song Festival	December 28, 2012	Seoul, South Korea	KBS Hall	"Sexy, Free & Single"; "Sorry, Sorry"		
SBS Gayo Daejeon	December 29, 2012	Seoul, South Korea	Korea University Hwajeong Gymnasium	"Sexy, Free & Single"		
MBC Gayo Daejejeon	January 1, 2013	Seoul, South Korea	MBC Ilsan Dream Center	"Sexy, Free & Single" (remix)		
Music Bank in Jakarta	March 9, 2013	Jakarta, Indonesia	Gelora Bung Karno Stadium	"Bonamana" (Rock ver.); "Oppa, Oppa"; "Sexy, Free & Single"	23,000	
a-nation stadium fes.	August 31, 2013	Tokyo, Japan	Ajinomoto Stadium	"Superman"; "Mr. Simple"; "Bijin (Bonamana)"; "Hero"		
Incheon Korean Music Wave 2013	September 1, 2013	Incheon, South Korea	Munhak World Cup Stadium		40,000	
KBS Music Bank Istanbul	September 8, 2013	Istanbul, Türkiye	Ülker Indoor Stadium	"Mr. Simple"; "Miracle"; "Sorry, Sorry"		
2014 Incheon Airport Sky Festival	September 27, 2014	Incheon, South Korea	Incheon International Airport	"Mamacita (Ayaya)"	50,000	
Best of Best in the Philippines	April 12, 2015	Bulacan, Philippines	Philippine Arena	"Shirt"; "This Is Love"; "Evanesce"; "Mr. Simple"; "Mamacita (Ayaya)"		
KCON LA 2015	August 1, 2015	Los Angeles, United States	Staples Center	"Twins"; "Sorry, Sorry"; "Mr. Simple"; "Oppa, Oppa"+"Rock Star"; "Devil"	27,793	
a-nation	August 29, 2015	Tokyo, Japan	Ajinomoto Stadium	"Bijin (Bonamana)"; "Mr. Simple"; "Sorry, Sorry"; "Join hands" (K.R.Y.); "Saturday Night"+"Oppa, Oppa" (D&E); "Disco Drive"+"Wonder Boy"; "Bambina"; "Let's Dance"	50,000	
K-Wave 2 Music Festival	January 13, 2018	Kuala Lumpur, Malaysia	Stadium Merdeka	"Sorry, Sorry"; "Bonamana"; "Mamacita"; "Black Suit"	20,000	
K-Pop World Festa Prime Concert	February 24, 2018	Gangneung, South Korea	Gangneung–Wonju National University Stadium			
KCON 2018 NY	June 23, 2018	Newark, United States	Prudential Center	"Sorry, Sorry"; "Mr. Simple"; "Bonamana"; "Rokkugo"; "Lo Siento (ft. Leslie Grace)"; "Miracle"	53,000	
2018 K-Flow Concert in Taiwan	August 11, 2018	Taoyuan, Taiwan	Linkou Arena	"Black Suit"; "Lo Siento (ft. Kard)"; "Sorry, Sorry"; "Bonamana"; "Miracle"	8,000	
a-nation	August 19, 2018	Osaka, Japan	Nagai Stadium	"Devil"; "Sorry, Sorry"; "Bonamana"	40,000	
V-Heartbeat	March 29, 2019	Ho Chi Minh City, Vietnam	Hoa Binh Theatre	"One More Chance"; "Sorry, Sorry"; "Bonamana"		
17th Korea Times Music Festival	April 27, 2019	Los Angeles, United States	Hollywood Bowl		20,000	
HallyuPopFest 2019	May 26, 2019	Kallang, Singapore	Singapore Indoor Stadium	"Sorry, Sorry"; "Bonamana"		
2019 K-World Festa	August 24, 2019	Seoul, South Korea	KSPO Dome	"Black Suit"; "Sorry, Sorry"; "Bonamana"		
2019 K-Flow2 Concert in Taiwan	September 21, 2019	Taoyuan, Taiwan	Linkou Arena	"Sorry, Sorry"; "Bonamana"; "Black Suit"; "U"	8,000	
2019 Busan One Asia Festival	October 19, 2019	Busan, South Korea	Hwamyeong Ecological Park	"Super Clap"; "Miracle"	25,000	
KAMP Singapore 2019	November 10, 2019	Kallang, Singapore	Singapore Indoor Stadium		18,000	
a-Nation Online 2020	August 29, 2020	Online	—	"U"; "Super Clap"; "Devil"; "2YA2YAO!"; "Mamacita" (Japanese ver.); "Mr. Simple" (Japanese ver.)		
2021 Busan One Asia Festival	May 8, 2021	Online	—	"Devil"; "Miracle"; "Sorry, Sorry"	13,000,000	
KAMP LA 2022	October 15, 2022	Pasadena, United States	Rose Bowl Stadium	"The Crown"; "2YA2YAO!"; "Black Suit"; "Devil"; "Don't Wait"; "Mango"; "Miracle"; "Sorry, Sorry"; "Bonamana"	— (Note: 80,000 tickets were sold but some ticket holders decided not to attend the festival due to the absence of several acts from the original line-up.)	
KCON Saudi Arabia 2023	October 6–7, 2023	Riyadh, Saudi Arabia	Boulevard Riyadh City		23,000	
Kstyle Party 2025	March 29, 2025	Tokyo, Japan	Ariake Arena	"Sorry, Sorry"; "Bonamana"; "Black Suit"; "Devil"; "Miracle"		
2025 SBS Mega Concert	May 31, 2025	Incheon, South Korea	Incheon Asiad Main Stadium	"Sorry, Sorry"; "Devil"; "Black Suit"	20,000	
2025 Busan One Asia Festival	June 13, 2025	Busan, South Korea	BEXCO			

=== Other festivals ===
Live performances in miscellaneous festivals
Event	Date	Location	Venue	Performed song(s)	Attendance	Ref.
2006 China Qingdao Korean Film Culture Festival	June 16, 2006	Qingdao, China	Tiantai Gymnasium	"U"; "Miracle"; "Show Me Your Love"		
2006 Shanghai International Film Festival	June 18, 2006	Shanghai, China	Shanghai Concert Hall	"U"; "Miracle"		
Busan Sea Festival	August 1, 2006	Busan, South Korea	Haeundae Beach		150,000	
Zio Summer Festival	August 12, 2006	Seoul, South Korea	Olympic Park Gymnastics Stadium		2,000	
Green Concert at the 2006 Gyeonggi Urban Forest Festival	August 25, 2006	Suwon, South Korea	2nd Outdoor Music Hall, Manseok Park			
World Peace Festival	September 21, 2006	Paju, South Korea	Imjingak Pyeonghwa-Nuri	"U"; "Dancing Out"		
Shimei Bay 2006 International Lantern Festival	November 28, 2006	Wanning, China	Shimei Bay Outdoor Special Stage	"U"; "Miracle"	40,000	
Hallyu Expo in Asia opening ceremony	November 29, 2006	Seogwipo, South Korea	International Convention Center Jeju		2,000	
2007 Blizzard WorldWide Invitational	May 19, 2007	Seoul, South Korea	Olympic Park Gymnastics Stadium			
Raemian Festival	October 19, 2007	Seoul, South Korea	Seoul World Cup Stadium		30,000	
Asia Dream Festival at Boryeong Mud Festival	July 13, 2008	Boryeong, South Korea	Daecheon beach			
Sarangnanum Fashion Festival at the 2009 Asia-Pacific Supermodel Contest	June 19, 2009	Pohang, South Korea	Pohang Sports Complex	"It's You"	30,000	
11th Shanghai China International Arts Festival (Note: Part of the Super Show 2 tour)	October 19, 2009	Shanghai, China	Yuanshen Sports Centre Stadium		12,000	
DMZ Peace Concert at the DMZ International Documentary Film Festival	August 14, 2011	Paju, South Korea	Pyeonghwa Nuri Music Hill			
Korea in Motion Festival	September 17, 2011	Seoul, South Korea	National Museum of Korea			
Paradise City Festival	September 21, 2018	Incheon, South Korea	Paradise City			
Jeddah Season Festival (Note: Part of the Super Show 7 tour)	July 12, 2019	Jeddah, Saudi Arabia	King Abdullah Sports City	"Black Suit"; "Mamacita"; "Sorry, Sorry"; "Devil"	15,000	

== Award shows ==
Performances in award shows
Event	Date	Location	Venue	Performed song(s)	Ref.
Seoul Drama Awards's eve	August 27, 2006	Seoul, South Korea	Seoul Plaza		
16th Seoul Music Awards	December 1, 2006	Ilsan, South Korea	KINTEX		
2nd SEED Awards	January 31, 2007	Bangkok, Thailand	BEC-Tero Hall	"Miracle"; "U"; "Dancing Out"; "Tic! Toc!"	
7th Top Chinese Music Awards	April 8, 2007	Beijing, China	Beijing Exhibition Center	"U"; "Miracle"	
18th Golden Melody Awards	June 16, 2007	Taipei, Taiwan	Taipei Arena	"U"; "Miracle"	
2007 Mnet Summer Break 20's Choice	August 21, 2007	Seoul, South Korea	Sheraton Walkerhill River Park outdoor swimming pool	"Haengbok"	
2007 Starlight Festival	December 17, 2007	Beijing, China	Overseas Chinese Town Grand Theatre	"Marry U"	
MTV Asia Awards 2008	August 2, 2008	Genting Highlands, Malaysia	Arena of Stars	"Mirror"; "Haengbok"; "Don't Don"; "A Man In Love"	
20th Golden Melody Awards	June 27, 2009	Taipei, Taiwan	Taipei Arena	"Sorry, Sorry"; "It's You"	
24th Golden Disk Awards	December 10, 2009	Seoul, South Korea	Olympic Hall	"Sorry, Sorry (remix)"	
19th Seoul Music Awards	February 3, 2010	Seoul, South Korea	Olympic Fencing Gymnasium	"Sorry, Sorry"	
2011 Mnet Asian Music Awards	November 29, 2011	Kallang, Singapore	Singapore Indoor Stadium	"Superman"; "Sorry, Sorry"; "Mr. Simple"	
26th Golden Disk Awards	January 11, 2012	Osaka, Japan	Kyocera Dome	"Mr. Simple"; "Bonamana" (Rock ver.)	
2012 Mnet Asian Music Awards	November 30, 2012	Hong Kong, China	HKCEC	"Spy"; "Sexy, Free & Single"	
22nd Seoul Music Awards	January 31, 2013	Seoul, South Korea	SK Olympic Handball Gymnasium	"Sexy, Free & Single"	
4th Gaon Chart K-pop Awards	January 28, 2015	Seoul, South Korea	Olympic Park Gymnastics Stadium	"Shirt"; "This Is Love"; "Mamacita"	
2017 Mnet Asian Music Awards in Hong Kong	December 1, 2017	Hong Kong, China	AsiaWorld Arena	"Black Suit"	
32nd Golden Disc Awards	January 11, 2018	Ilsan, South Korea	KINTEX	"Runaway"; "Black Suit"	
27th Seoul Music Awards	January 25, 2018	Seoul, South Korea	Gocheok Sky Dome	"Black Suit"	
2018 Telehit Awards	November 7, 2018	Mexico City, Mexico	Estadio Azteca	"Sorry, Sorry"; "Ahora te Puedes Marchar"	
14th KKBox Music Awards	January 26, 2019	Taipei, Taiwan	Taipei Arena	"Sorry, Sorry"; "Bonamana"; "Black Suit"	
2019 Asia Artist Awards	November 26, 2019	Hanoi, Vietnam	Mỹ Đình National Stadium	"Super Clap"; "The Crown"; "Sorry, Sorry"; "Bonamana"	
29th Seoul Music Awards	January 30, 2020	Seoul, South Korea	Gocheok Sky Dome	"2YA2YAO"; "Super Clap"; "Sorry, Sorry"	
2020 Asia Artist Awards	November 28, 2020	Online (Note: Recorded in Seoul, South Korea)	—	"U"; "Sorry, Sorry"; "Mr. Simple"; "Black Suit"	
2020 The Fact Music Awards	December 12, 2020	Online	—	"When We Were Us" (KRY); "BAD" (D&E); "Burn The Floor"; "Super Clap"	
2021 The Fact Music Awards	October 2, 2021	Online	—	"House Party"; "Black Suit"; "Devil"; "Sorry, Sorry"	
2025 MAMA Awards	November 28, 2025	Hong Kong, China	Kai Tak Stadium	"Express Mode"; "Mr. Simple"; "Bonamana"; "Sorry, Sorry"	
2026 TMElive International Music Awards	August 22, 2026	Hong Kong, China	Kai Tak Stadium	"Express Mode"; "Mr. Simple"; "Bonamana"; "Dancing Out"; "Wonder Boy"; "Sorry, Sorry"	

== Television shows and specials ==
=== South Korean music shows ===
Live performances on South Koreans music shows
Title	Year	Performed song(s) (Note: Songs that are performed on different episodes in the same calendar year will be listed together)	Notes	Ref.
Inkigayo	2005	"Twins"; "Show Me Your Love"		
Inkigayo	2006	"Miracle"; "U"; "Dancing Out"		
Inkigayo	2007	"Haengbok"; "Don't Don"; "Marry U"		
Inkigayo	2009	"Sorry, Sorry"; "Why I Like You"; "Sorry, Sorry (remix)"; "Neorago"		
Inkigayo	2010	"Bonamana"; "Nappeun Yeoja"; "No Other"		
Inkigayo	2011	"Oops!!"; "A-Cha"; "Superman"; "Mr. Simple"	Including United Nations Convention to Combat Desertification special episode	
Inkigayo	2012	"Sexy, Free & Single"; "From U"; "Spy"		
Inkigayo	2014	"Mamacita"; "This Is Love"; "Evanesce"		
Inkigayo	2015	"Devil"		
Inkigayo	2017	"Black Suit"; "One More Chance"		
Inkigayo	2018	"Lo Siento (ft. Kard)"; "One More Time (Otra Vez)"		
Inkigayo	2019	"Super Clap"; "I Think I"		
Inkigayo	2021	"House Party"		
Inkigayo	2022	"Callin'"		
Inkigayo	2024	"Show Time"		
Inkigayo	2025	"Express Mode"		
Show! Music Tank	2006	"Twins"		
Show! Music Tank	2007	"U"	Including 600th episode special	
M Countdown	2005	"Twins"; "Show Me Your Love"		
M Countdown	2006	"Miracle"; "U"		
M Countdown	2007	"Haengbok"; "Don't Don"; "U"; "Dancing Out"; "Marry U"	Including episode 100 special	
M Countdown	2011	"Superman"; "Sorry, Sorry"; Mr. Simple; "Bonamana (Miina)"		
M Countdown	2012	"From U"; "Sexy, Free & Single"; "Spy"	Including episode 300 special	
M Countdown	2014	"Shirt"; "Mamacita"; "Evanesce"; "This Is Love"		
M Countdown	2015	"Devil"		
M Countdown	2017	"Black Suit"; "One More Chance"		
M Countdown	2018	"Lo Siento"		
M Countdown	2021	"House Party"; "Burn The Floor"		
M Countdown	2022	"Callin'"		
M Countdown	2025	"Express Mode"		
Show! Music Core	2006	"U"		
Show! Music Core	2007	"Haengbok"; "Missing You" (with Park Nam-jung); "Wonder Boy"; "Don't Don"		
Show! Music Core	2009	"Sorry, Sorry"; "Why I Like You"; "Neorago"		
Show! Music Core	2010	"Nappeun Yeoja"; "Bonamana"; "No Other"		
Show! Music Core	2011	"Superman"; "Mr. Simple"; "A-Cha"	Including Korean Grand Prix special	
Show! Music Core	2012	"Sexy, Free & Single"; "From U"; "Spy"		
Show! Music Core	2014	"Mamacita"; "Shirt"		
Show! Music Core	2015	"Devil"		
Show! Music Core	2018	"Lo Siento (ft. Kard)"; "One More Time (Otra Vez) (SJ ver.)"		
Show! Music Core	2019	"Super Clap"; "I Think I"		
Show! Music Core	2021	"House Party"; "Burn The Floor"		
Show! Music Core	2022	"Callin'"		
Show! Music Core	2024	"Show Time"		
Show! Music Core	2025	"Express Mode"		
Music Bank	2006	"Miracle"; "Endless Moment"		
Music Bank	2007	"Don't Don"; "A Nest (with Nam Jin)"		
Music Bank	2009	"Sorry, Sorry"; "Why I Like You"; "Neorago"		
Music Bank	2010	"Bonamana"; "Nappeun Yeoja (Boom Boom)"; "No Other"		
Music Bank	2011	"Superman"; "Mr. Simple"; "A-Cha"		
Music Bank	2012	"Sexy, Free & Single"; "Spy"		
Music Bank	2014	"Mamacita"; "Shirt"; "This Is Love"; "Evanesce"		
Music Bank	2015	"Devil"		
Music Bank	2017	"Black Suit"; "One More Chance"		
Music Bank	2019	"Super Clap"; "I Think I"; "Sorry, Sorry"	Including year-end special episode "Merry Christmas in Advance"	
Music Bank	2021	"House Party"		
Music Bank	2022	"Callin'"		
Music Bank	2025	"Express Mode"		
Show Champion	2012	"Sexy, Free & Single"		
Show Champion	2014	"Shirt"; "Mamacita"		

=== Other television shows and specials ===
Live performances on other TV shows and TV specials
Title	Year	Performed song(s)	Notes	Ref.
MTV Dream Station	2006	"Show Me Your Love"; "You Are The One"; "Twins"		
MTV School Attack	2006	"Miracle"; "You Are The One"; "Saranghagi ttaemune"	Performed at Salesio Girls' High School in Gwangju	
A-LI[V]E	2006	"Miracle"		
2006 Children's Day Special Live Broadcast – We are Dreamers	2006	"Miracle"	Performed at the Blue House	
Germany World Cup D-30 Special Live – Dasi hanbon Daehanminguk	2006	"Miracle"		
2006 Germany World Cup Togo-jeon seungrigiwon dasi hanbon Daehanminguk	2006	"U"; "Miracle"	Special program to cheer for South Korea at the 2006 FIFA World Cup during the match of South Korea vs Togo	
School of Rock	2006	"U"; "You Are The One"; "Miracle"	Performed at Gyeongin Girls' High School in Incheon	
School Gfest	2006	"U"	Performed at Seoul Visual Media High School	
Kim Yoon-ah's Music Wave	2006	"U"; "Please Forget Me" (Note: Originally by Gummy); "Love Me Once Again" (Note: Originally by Vibe); "I am a Man" (Note: Originally by Kim Jang-hoon)		
Seed Show	2006	"Dancing Out"; "Endless Moment"; "U"; "Miracle"	Thai music show	
Academy Fantasia season 4	2007	"Haengbok"	Thai reality TV singing competition, episode 4	
Hi Everyone, MBC every1	2007	"Don't Don"	MBC every1 opening ceremony show	
2007 Asia Pacific Supermodel Contest	2007	"Don't Don"; "Marry U"		
Kim Jung-eun's Chocolate	2009	"Tell Her" (Note: Sobangcha cover); "Bimireun Eobseo" (Note: Roo'ra cover); "Candy"		
Eumagyeohaeng lalala	2009	"Gee"; "She"	Episode "Sounds Like Teen Spirit"	
Eumagyeohaeng lalala	2010	"You and Me Again"; "Sarangingayo"; "Bonamana" (all with Park Sae-byul)	Episode "Cross Harmony of different voices"	
2010 Miss Korea Pageant	2010	"Bonamana"		
You Hee-yeol's Sketchbook	2010	"More Than Words" (Note: Originally by 5tion); "Bird" (Note: Originally by Psy); "Good Person"; "No Other"		
You Hee-yeol's Sketchbook	2011	"Oops! (ft. Tiffany Young)"		
You Hee-yeol's Sketchbook	2021	"U"; "Sorry, Sorry"; "Devil"; "House Party"		
Super Junior The Stage	2020	"2YA2YAO!"		
Transmedia 19 Universe	2020	"Super Clap"; "2YA2YAO!"; "The Melody"	Trans Media 19th anniversary special	
2 Dekade Transmedia	2021	"Sorry, Sorry"; "Devil"; "Black Suit"; "House Party"	Trans Media 20th anniversary special	
Famous Singers — Battle Again	2022	"Sorry, Sorry"; "U"; "Devil"; "Mango"		
Express Mode Show: The 20 Awards	2025	"Express Mode"; "Haircut"; "Stuck With You"; "U"; "Sorry, Sorry"		
The Seasons: Park Bo-gum's Cantabile	2025	"Miracle"; "U"; "Sorry, Sorry"; "Mr. Simple"; "Devil"; "I Know"; "Marry U" (with Park Bo-gum)		
M:ZINE	2025	"Express Mode"	Japanese music show	

== Radio shows ==
Live performances on radio shows
Program	Date	Station	Performed song(s)	Ref.
Sukira	March 13, 2009	KBS Cool FM	"Sorry, Sorry"; "Reset"	
Cultwo Show	July 9, 2025	SBS Power FM	"Express Mode"	

== Sporting events ==
List of live performances in sporting events
Event	Date	Location	Venue	Performed song(s)	Ref.
2006 National Sports Festival for Everyday Life opening ceremony	April 14, 2006	Yeosu, South Korea	Jinnam Stadium		
52nd Gyeonggi Province Sports Festival	May 2, 2006	Goyang, South Korea	Goyang Stadium		
Run to 2014 New Dream Tour Concert (Note: 2014 Winter Olympics bid nationwide concert)	June 29, 2006	Seoul, South Korea	Sangam World Cup Stadium	"Dancing Out"	
87th Korean National Sports Festival closing ceremony	October 23, 2006	Gimcheon, South Korea	Gimcheon Sports Complex		
2006 K-League Championship: Suwon Samsung Bluewings vs Pohang Steelers playoff halftime performance	November 12, 2006	Suwon, South Korea	Suwon World Cup Stadium		
Opening Day of 2007 Korea Professional Baseball season (Note: Performed at SK Wyverns home stadium)	April 10, 2007	Incheon, South Korea	Munhak Baseball Stadium		
55th Gyeonggi Province Sports Festival opening ceremony	May 9, 2009	Icheon, South Korea	Icheon Sports Complex		
2018 PyeongChang Winter Olympics Hosting Festival	October 8, 2011	PyeongChang, South Korea	Alpensia Ski Jumping Stadium		
2011 Formula 1 Korean Grand Prix	October 15, 2011	Yeongam, South Korea	Korea International Circuit		
2018 Asian Games closing ceremony	September 2, 2018	Jakarta, Indonesia	Gelora Bung Karno Stadium	"Sorry, Sorry"; "Mr. Simple"; "Bonamana"	

== Other live performances ==
List of miscellaneous live performances
Event	Date	Location	Venue	Performed song(s)	Ref.
BBQ Big 4 Concert	April 9, 2006	Seoul, South Korea	Seoul Olympic Park Fencing Stadium	"Miracle"	
Everland 30th anniversary	April 15, 2006	Yongin, South Korea	Everland Seomun Event Plaza	"Miracle"	
2006 Jeju Visit Year special event	April 22, 2006	Jeju Island, South Korea	International Convention Center Jeju		
Cheonsonyeon sarang Concert	May 5, 2006	Seoul, South Korea	Jamsil Olympic Stadium	"Miracle"	
Korea Singers Association's foundation anniversary	November 30, 2006	Seoul, South Korea	Vista Hall, Sheraton Walkerhill Hotel		
2nd K-Pop Super Live Concert	January 6, 2007	Saitama, Japan	Saitama Super Arena	"Miracle"; "Endless Moment"; "Dancing Out"; "U"	
M Countdown Tokyo 2007	August 5, 2007	Tokyo, Japan	Tokyo International Forum	"U"; "Miracle"; "Haengbok"	
United Nations Day Commemorative Concert	October 13, 2007	Incheon, South Korea	Incheon Munhak Stadium		
2007 Chin Chin Clean Concert	November 21, 2007	Seoul, South Korea	Dome Art Hall, Children's Grand Park		
Music In Harmony	January 5, 2008	Taipei, Taiwan	National Taiwan University Gymnasium	"Haengbok"; "Marry U"; "Don't Don"; "Galjeung"; "The One I Love" (K.R.Y.)	
Ususinin 2008 Sinnyeon M-Super Concert	January 26, 2008	Seoul, South Korea	Melon-AX Hall		
2008 Yedang Online Power Concert	May 3, 2008	Seoul, South Korea	Jamsil Indoor Stadium	"Mirror"; "Rokkugo"	
3rd K-Pop Super Live	January 31, 2009	Tokyo, Japan	Tokyo International Forum	"Cooking Cooking"; "Sunny"; "One Love"; "Pajama Party"	
Descendants of the Dragon: Jackie Chan and Friends	May 1, 2009	Beijing, China	Bird's Nest	"Sorry, Sorry"; "Why I Like You"	
MTV EXIT	March 27, 2010	Hanoi, Vietnam	Mỹ Đình National Stadium	"Sorry, Sorry"; "It's You"; "Rokkugo"; "Haengbok"	
KBS first 3D live broadcast	May 19, 2010	Seoul, South Korea	Yeouido Park	"Bonamana"	
2011 Dream of Asia Concert in Taiwan	January 22, 2011	New Taipei City, Taiwan	Banqiao First Stadium		
4th K-Pop Super Live	May 15, 2011	Chiba, Japan	Makuhari Messe	"Bonamana"; "No Other"; "Miracle"; "Sorry, Sorry"; "It Has To Be You" (Yesung solo)	
K-pop Star season 1 audition	October 2, 2011	Seoul, South Korea	Jamsil Sports Complex	"A-cha"; "Sorry, Sorry"	
Busan MBC Charity Power Concert	October 2, 2011	Busan, South Korea	Busan Asiad Main Stadium		
M-Live Concert	November 26, 2011	Kaohsiung, Taiwan	Kaohsiung Arena		
M-Live by CJ MO.A	December 3, 2011	Petaling Jaya, Malaysia	MBPJ Stadium	"Sorry, Sorry"	
MBC Korean Music Wave in Google	May 21, 2012	Mountain View, United States	Shoreline Amphitheatre	"Mr. Simple"; "Sorry, Sorry"	
M-Live by CJ MO.A 2012	August 26, 2012	Guangzhou, China	Guangzhou International Sports Arena	"Sexy, Free & Single"	
M! Countdown Smile Thailand	October 4, 2012	Bangkok, Thailand	Rajamangala Stadium	"Spy"; "Sexy, Free & Single"	
GS & Concert	October 21, 2012	Seoul, South Korea	Jamsil Indoor Stadium		
2013 Korea–China Friendship Concert	June 29, 2013	Beijing, China	National Olympic Sports Center Gymnasium	"Mr. Simple"; "Sexy, Free & Single"	
MBC Food Bank Sharing Concert	September 27, 2014	Suwon, South Korea	Suwon World Cup Stadium		
World Is One	July 9, 2020	Online	—	"2YA2YAO!"; "Super Clap"; "Devil"	
Killing Voice	July 15, 2025	Online	—	"Sorry, Sorry"; "Mr. Simple"; "Mamacita"; "Don't Don"; "Mirror"; "One More Chance"; "Rokkugo"; "Miracle"; "From U"; "It's You"; "No Other"; "U"; "Callin'"; "Somebody New"; "Devil"; "Black Suit"; "Twins (Knock Out)"; "Express Mode"	
Countdown 2026 at The Kallang	December 31, 2025 - January 1, 2026	Kallang, Singapore	The Kallang	"Express Mode"; "Sorry, Sorry"; "Devil"; "Miracle" (January 1, 2026)	

== See also ==
- Yesung#Concert and tours
- Kim Ryeo-wook#Concert
- Cho Kyuhyun#Concert and tours
