= 2014 UCI Juniors Track World Championships =

- Venue: (South Korea) Gwangmyeong Speedom in Gwangmyeong
- Date: 8–12 August 2014

The 2014 UCI Juniors Track World Championships were the 40th annual Junior World Championships for track cycling, held at the Gwangmyeong Speedom in Gwangmyeong, South Korea from 8 to 12 August.

The Championships had ten events for men (sprint, points race, individual pursuit, team pursuit, 1 kilometre time trial, team sprint, keirin, madison, scratch race, omnium) and nine for women (sprint, individual pursuit, 500 metre time trial, points race, keirin, scratch race, team sprint, team pursuit, omnium).

== Medal summary ==
Event	Gold	Silver	Bronze
Men's Events
Sprint	Park Jeo-ne; South Korea	Sébastien Vigier; France	Braeden Dean; Australia
Points race	Regan Gough; New Zealand	Nikolai Ilichev; Russia	Edgar Stepanyan; Armenia
Individual pursuit	Ivo Oliveira; Portugal	Regan Gough; New Zealand	Daniel Fitter; Australia
Team pursuit	Alexander Porter; Sam Welsford; Callum Scotson; Daniel Fitter; Australia	Jaime Restrepo; Wilmar Paredes; Julián Cardona; Javier Ignacio Montoya; Colombia	Regan Gough; Nicholas Kergozou; Luke Mudgway; Jack Ford; New Zealand
Time trial	Jiří Janošek; Czech Republic	Alexey Nosov; Russia	Muhammad Firdau Mohd Zonis; Malaysia
Team sprint	Sergey Gorlov; Alexey Nosov; Sergey Tabolin; Russia	Jeahee Jung; Hyeyun Seok; Seongjin Son; South Korea	Marcin Czyszczewski; Michal Lewandowski; Patryk Rajkowski; Poland
Keirin	Sergey Gorlov; Russia	Benjamin Gil; France	Patryk Rajkowski; Poland
Madison	Regan Gough; Luke Mudgway; New Zealand	Marc Jurczyk; Manuel Porzner; Germany	Ivo Oliveira; Rui Oliveira; Portugal
Scratch race	Sergey Rostovtsev; Russia	Mathias Albrechtsen; Denmark	Rui Oliveira; Portugal
Omnium	Casper Pedersen; Denmark	Sam Welsford; Australia	Kim Ji-hoon; South Korea

Event	Gold	Silver	Bronze
Women's Events
Sprint	Courtney Field; Australia	Tatiana Kiseleva; Russia	Nicky Degrendele; Belgium
Individual pursuit	Alexandra Manly; Australia	Lisa Klein; Germany	Lauren Perry; Australia
Time trial	Tatiana Kiseleva; Russia	Courtney Field; Australia	Emma Hinze; Germany
Points race	Camila Valbuena; Colombia	Yumi Kajihara; Japan	Josie Talbot; Australia
Keirin	Nicky Degrendele; Belgium	Courtney Field; Australia	Doreen Heinze; Germany
Scratch race	Amalie Dideriksen; Denmark	Soline Lamboley; France	Josie Talbot; Australia
Team sprint	Doreen Heinze; Emma Hinze; Germany	Tatiana Kiseleva; Anna Kozinova; Russia	Choi Seulgi; Jang Yeonhee; South Korea
Team pursuit	Macey Stewart; Alexandra Manly; Josie Talbot; Danielle McKinnirey; Australia	Martina Alzini; Claudia Cretti; Maria Vittoria Sperotto; Daniela Magnetto; Italy	Holly Edmondston; Bryony Botha; Holly White; Nina Wollaston; New Zealand
Omnium	Macey Stewart; Australia	Martina Alzini; Italy	Soline Lamboley; France

== Medals table ==
* Host nation (South Korea)

Rank	Nation	Gold	Silver	Bronze	Total
1	Australia (AUS)	5	3	5	13
2	Russia (RUS)	4	4	0	8
3	New Zealand (NZL)	2	1	2	5
4	Denmark (DEN)	2	1	0	3
5	Germany (DEU)	1	2	2	5
6	South Korea (KOR)*	1	1	2	4
7	Colombia (COL)	1	1	0	2
8	Portugal (POR)	1	0	2	3
9	Belgium (BEL)	1	0	1	2
10	Czech Republic (CZE)	1	0	0	1
11	France (FRA)	0	3	1	4
12	Italy (ITA)	0	2	0	2
13	Japan (JPN)	0	1	0	1
14	Poland (POL)	0	0	2	2
15	Armenia (ARM)	0	0	1	1
15	Malaysia (MAS)	0	0	1	1
Totals (16 entries)		19	19	19	57
