= SM Town Live Culture Humanity =

2021 concert by SM Entertainment artists

SM Town Live "Culture Humanity"
- Online live concert by SM Entertainment artists
- Promotional poster
- Location: Worldwide
- Date: January 1, 2021
- Duration: 240 minutes
- No. of shows: 1
- Attendance: 35.83 million

SM Entertainment artists concert chronology
- SMTOWN Live 2019 in Tokyo (2019); SMTOWN LIVE "Culture Humanity" (2021); SMTOWN LIVE 2022: SMCU EXPRESS @ KWANGYA (2022)

SM Town Live Culture Humanity (stylized as SMTOWN LIVE "Culture Humanity") was an online live concert held by SM Entertainment artists. The concert was held on January 1, 2021, and broadcast through Facebook, Twitter, V Live, YouTube, TikTok, Beyond Live and KNTV. The online live concert received 35.83 million viewers from 186 countries, becoming SM Town's most successful concert to date and the highest streamed concert in South Korean history.

== Background and development ==
On December 28, 2020, SM Entertainment announced that they would hold a free-of-charge online live concert. According to the music agency, the concert was designed to comfort and convey hope to people around the world who were having a hard time due to COVID-19 in the new year.

== Commercial reception ==
SM Entertainment's livestreamed global online live concert drew a record-breaking 35.83 million viewers on New Year's Day in video streaming platforms such as V Live, YouTube, Twitter, Facebook and TikTok.

== Performers ==
- Kangta
- TVXQ
- Super Junior (Super Junior-K.R.Y., Super Junior-D&E)
- Taeyeon (Girls' Generation)
- Taemin (Shinee)
- Baekhyun (Exo)
- Kai (Exo)
- Red Velvet
- NCT (NCT U, NCT 127, NCT Dream, WayV)
- SuperM
- Aespa
- ScreaM Records (Raiden, Ginjo, Imlay)

== Set list ==
This set list is intended to represent the show from the online live concert.

1. "Ridin'" – NCT Dream
2. "Take Off" – WayV
3. "Punch" – NCT 127
4. "Bad Boy" – Red Velvet
5. "Peek-A-Boo" – Red Velvet
6. "The Riot" – Ginjo ft. Ten and Xiaojun of NCT
7. "Mmmh" – Kai
8. "Reason" – Kai
9. "Criminal" – Taemin
10. "Idea" – Taemin
11. "Growing Pains" – Super Junior-D&E
12. "Asteroid" – Imlay ft. Yangyang of NCT
13. "100" – SuperM
14. "Better Days" – SuperM
15. "UN Village" – Baekhyun ft. Mark of NCT
16. "Candy" – Baekhyun
17. "When We Were Us" – Super Junior-K.R.Y.
18. "Cough Syrup" – Kangta
19. "Four Seasons" – Taeyeon
20. "Happy" – Taeyeon
21. "What Do I Call You" – Taeyeon
22. "Yours" – Raiden ft. Winter of Aespa
23. "From Home" – NCT U
24. "Make A Wish (Birthday Song)" – NCT U
25. "Work It" – NCT U
26. "90's Love" – NCT U
27. "Super Clap" – Super Junior
28. "2YA2YAO!" – Super Junior
29. "The Chance of Love" – TVXQ
30. "Dream" – TVXQ
31. "Black Mamba" – Aespa
32. "Déjà Vu" – NCT Dream
33. "Turn Back Time" – WayV
34. "Kick It" – NCT 127
35. "Psycho" – Red Velvet
36. "One (Monster & Infinity)" – SuperM
37. "Burn the Floor" – Super Junior
38. "Keep Your Head Down" – TVXQ
39. "Hope" – SM Town
40. ScreaM Stage – Raiden
41. ScreaM Stage – Ginjo
42. ScreaM Stage – Imlay
