= I Think I =

- Japanese version cover

Single by Super Junior

from the album Time Slip and I Think U
- Language: Korean; Japanese
- Released: October 4, 2019
- Recorded: 2019
- Studio: Doobdoob (Seoul); Golden Bell Tree Sound (Seoul)
- Genre: Latin pop; R&B
- Length: 3:22
- Label: SM; Label SJ; Dreamus; Avex Trax
- Composers: Rudi Daouk; Jakob Mihoubi; Nermin Harambašić; Jinbyjin
- Lyricists: Jo Yoon-kyung; Lee Hyuk-jae; January 8th; Hideo Toyosaki (JP)
- Producer: Jinbyjin

Super Junior singles chronology
"The Crown" (2019)	"I Think I" (2019)	"Super Clap" (2019)

Music videos
- "I Think I" on YouTube
- "I Think I (Japanese version)" on YouTube

"I Think I" is a single by South Korean boy band Super Junior released on October 4, 2019, by SM Entertainment and Label SJ. The single was featured in Super Junior's ninth Korean-language studio album, Time Slip (and later in its repackage Timeless) as the fourth pre-release single. The song was then re-released in Japanese on October 30, 2019, as the lead single for their first Japanese EP, I Think U.

== Background ==
"I Think I" features the vocals of nine active Super Junior members — Leeteuk, Heechul, Yesung, Donghae, Shindong, Eunhyuk, Siwon, Ryeowook, and Kyuhyun. Kyuhyun was discharged from his mandatory military service on May 7, 2019, and did not partake in the band's previous release, One More Time.

Kangin, who had been on hiatus since 2016 announced his decision to depart from the band on July 11. Sungmin continues his indefinite hiatus and voluntarily did not join band activities after last appearing for them for Mamacita album back in 2014. As a result, Super Junior became a ten-member group with nine active members promoting.

During the band's appearance at HallyuPopFest on May 28, Leeteuk announced the band will release a new album in 2019, to celebrate the group's 15th anniversary.

On September 3, Super Junior began releasing teaser images to generate hype for the album's release on October 14. The song was digitally released alongside its music video on October 4, albeit five hours behind schedule due to an alleged production issue. On October 30, the song was digitally released in Japanese.

== Composition ==
"I Think I" is classified as a fusion between Latin pop music with jazz strings and horns, and R&B, the former was a nod to their debut extended play. The song was composed by Rudi Daouk, Jakob Mihoubi, Nermin Harambašić, and JINBYJIN in the key of F-sharp major, with the tempo of 145 beats per minute. Its lyrics were written by January 8th, Jo Yoon-kyung, and member Eunhyuk. JINBYJIN was credited as the producer of the song.

The lyrics of the song likens a time spent together akin to dancing.

== Music video ==
The music video for the song features the members walking around New York's 14th Street station. The music video featured minimalist choreography for a track with a dance rhythm.

The Japanese version of the music video shows the members dancing around several sets.

== Live performances ==
The group promoted the song on KBS World's Music Bank on October 18 alongside "Super Clap". On October 26, the group performed the song at MBC's Show! Music Core.

The song was included in the setlist for the group's eighth tour (in overall), Super Show 8.

== Credits and personnel ==
Credits adapted from the album's liner notes.

Studio

- Doobdoob Studio – recording, digital editing
- Golden Bell Tree Sound – recording
- SM LVYIN Studio – engineered for mix
- SM Concert Hall Studio – mixing
- The Mastering Palace – mastering

Personnel

- Label SJ – executive producer
- SM Entertainment – executive supervisor
- Lee Soo-man – producer
- Yoo Young-jin – music and sound supervisor
- Super Junior – vocals
  - Eunhyuk – Korean lyrics
- January 8th – Korean lyrics
- Jo Yoon-kyung – Korean lyrics
- Hideo Toyosaki – Japanese lyrics
- Jakob Mihoubi – composition, background vocals
- Nermin Harambašić – composition
- Rudi Daouk – composition, background vocals
- Choi Jin-suk a.k.a Jinbyjin – producer, composition, arrangement
- Onestar – vocal directing, background vocals
- Hong Seong-jun – recording
- Hong Soo-yeon – recording
- Kim Hyun-gon – recording
- Eugene Kwon – recording
- Jang Woo-young – digital editing
- Lee Ji-hong – engineered for mix
- Nam Koong-jin – mixing
- Dave Kutch – mastering

== Chart ==
Chart performance for "I Think I"
Chart (2019)	Peak position
Japan Download Songs (Billboard Japan)	95
US World Digital Song Sales (Billboard)	19

== Release history ==
Release history for "I Think I"
Region	Date	Version	Format	Label	Ref
Various	October 4, 2019	Korean	Digital download; streaming	SM; Label SJ; Dreamus	
Japan	January 29, 2020	Japanese	CD; DVD	Avex Trax	
Various	January 29, 2020	Japanese	Digital download; streaming	Avex Trax	
