= Belder =

Belder is a surname.

- Bas Belder (born 1946), Dutch politician and Member of the European Parliament
- Dylan De Belder (born 1992), Belgian footballer
- Pieter-Jan Belder (born 1966), Dutch instrumentalist in historically informed performance, playing recorder, harpsichord and fortepiano
- Rikki Belder (born 1993), Australian Track Cyclist
