= I Think U =

- Digital and CD+DVD cover

EP by Super Junior
- Released: 29 January 2020
- Recorded: 2019
- Studio: In Grid (Seoul); Sound Pool (Seoul)
- Genre: J-pop
- Length: 17:30
- Language: Japanese
- Label: Avex Trax; Label SJ; SM Japan
- Producer: Nam So-young; Shinji Hayashi; Dani Paz; Chris Meyer; Aleks Wann; Hitfire

Super Junior chronology
Time Slip (2019)	I Think U (2020)	Star (2021)

Singles from I Think U
- 1. "I Think I -Japanese Version-" Released: 30 October 2019

I Think U is the first Japanese EP released by the South Korean boy band Super Junior, on 29 January 2020 under the label Avex Trax in Japan. The album peaked at number one in Oricon Daily Albums Chart on the day of its release.

== Background and release ==
Super Junior had ten members at the release of I Think U. The album featured all members of the band except Sungmin who had been sitting out of the group activity since 2017. Although Heechul is involved in the album's recording, he did not participate in the album's supporting tour, Super Show 8 due to health issues.

The band's previous album, Time Slip, which was released on 14 October 2019, featured a latin pop influenced track, "I Think I". On 30 October 2019, Super Junior released the Japanese version of the single, entitled "I Think I -Japanese Version-" In December 2019, it was announced that a Japanese mini album will be released on 29 January 2020, six years after the band's last Japanese album, and will feature "I Think I -Japanese Version-" as its lead single.

An album cover video teaser was released on 17 December 2019, which featured Super Junior members wearing college-like outfits. On 6 January 2020, the band released a teaser for "I Think I -Japanese Version-" music video. They further released a lyrics video teaser of the album on 27 January, and confirmed that the track list consisted of five songs including the lead single.

== Composition ==
The track "Fly to the Moon" was described as a pop song that "gave the feeling of driving under the moonlight" and featured punk guitar and retro style synth. The third track "Spotlight" is a disco-pop dance song, and was described as a song with "dynamic composition". "BLUE" was sung by Leeteuk, Yesung, Shindong, and Eunhyuk. It is described as a song that "expresses the emotions of love, pain, and longing in the deep blue of the sea." Meanwhile, the track "Ai ga Oshiete Kureta Koto", which means "what love has thought me", was composed by the band member, Donghae with its lyrics describing a break-up experience.

== Promotions ==
Super Junior made their debut performance of "I Think I -Japanese Version-" on the Japan leg of their concert tour, Super Show 8: Infinite Time, at Saitama Super Arena on 2 November 2019. They also made stops at the Maruzen Intec Arena in Osaka on 7–9 February and the Marine Messe in Fukuoka on 15 and 16 February 2020. However, two concerts which were planned to be held on the 25 and 26 March 2020 in Saitama was cancelled following the travel restriction imposed by Japanese government following the COVID-19 pandemic.

== Track listing ==
I Think U track listing
No.	Title	Lyrics	Music	Length
1.	"Fly to the Moon"	Rie Tsukagoshi	Chris Meyer; Dani Paz; Aleks Wann	3:07
2.	"I Think I -Japanese Version-"	January 8th; Jo Yoon-kyung; Eunhyuk; h.toyosaki	Jin Suk Choi; Nermin Harambasic; Jakob Mihoubi; Rudi Daouk	3:22
3.	"Spotlight"	h.toyosaki	Erik Lidbom; SAMDELL	3:20
4.	"BLUE"	Young Sky; HASEGAWA	Young Sky; Leeteuk	4:03
5.	"愛が教えてくれたこと" (Ai ga oshiete kureta koto)	Natsumi Kobayashi	Donghae; J-DUB	3:38
Total length:				17:30

== Sales and reception ==
I Think U received commercial success as it sold 42,598 units on its first week sale in Japan. The album also peaked at number one in Oricon Daily Albums Chart on its first day of sale.

== Charts ==
Weekly sales chart performance for I Think U
Chart (2020)	Peak position
Japanese Albums (Oricon)	2
Japanese Hot Albums (Billboard Japan)	2
Japanese Download Albums (Billboard Japan)	10

Monthly sales chart performance for I Think U
Chart (2020)	Peak position
Japanese albums (Oricon)	9

Year-end chart performance for I Think U
Chart (2020)	Position
Japanese Albums (Oricon)	75
Japanese Hot Albums (Billboard Japan)	88

== Release history ==
Release formats for I Think U
Region	Date	Format	Label
Japan	29 January 2020	CD; DVD; Blu-ray	Avex Trax
Various	29 January 2020	Digital download; streaming	Avex Trax
South Korea	12 February 2020	Digital download; streaming	SM; Label SJ; Dreamus

== See also ==
- List of 2020 albums
