= La Périgord Ladies =

Race details
- Date: August/September
- Region: France
- Discipline: Road

History
- First edition: 2019
- Editions: 6 (as of 2024)
- First winner: Coralie Demay (FRA)
- Most recent: Josie Talbot (AUS)

La Périgord Ladies is an elite women's professional one-day road bicycle race held in France and is currently rated by the UCI as a 1.2 race.

== Past winners ==
Year	Country	Rider	Team
2019	France	Coralie Demay	FDJ Nouvelle-Aquitaine Futuroscope
2020	Spain	Sheyla Gutiérrez	Movistar Team
2021	Italy	Marta Bastianelli	Alé BTC Ljubljana
2022	Australia	Grace Brown	FDJ Suez Futuroscope
2023	Netherlands	Amber Kraak	Team Jumbo–Visma
2024	Australia	Josie Talbot	Cofidis
