= Josie Talbot =

Australian cyclist (born 1996)

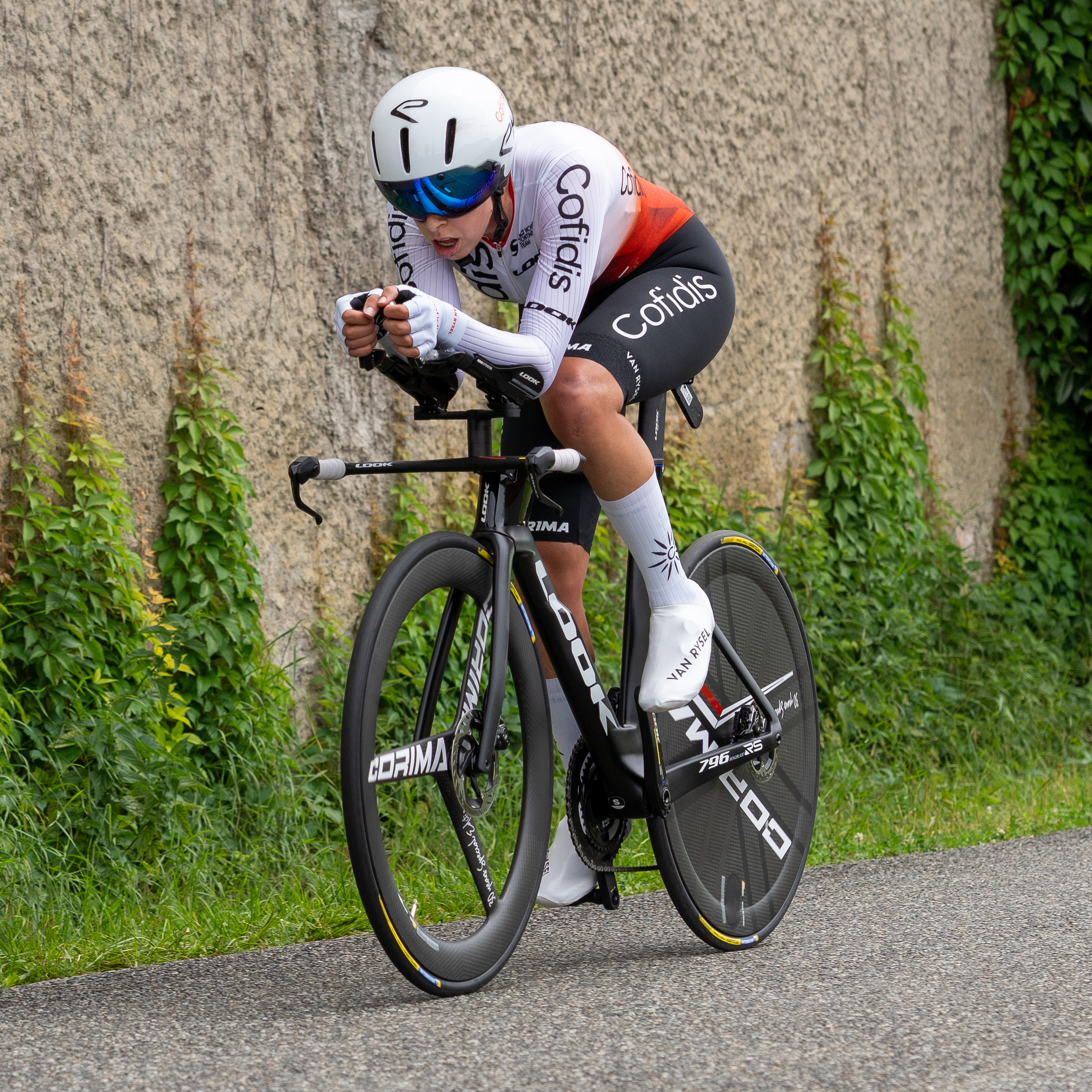
- Talbot in 2023

Personal information
- Born: 9 August 1996 (age 30) Sydney, Australia

Cycling career
- Sport: Cycling
- Current team: Liv AlUla Jayco
- Disciplines: Road; Track
- Role: Rider

Amateur teams
- 2016: Subaru NSWIS NKC
- 2018: ISCorp p/b Progress Software
- 2022: Isorex No-Aqua Ladies Cycling Team

Professional teams
- 2017: Team Illuminate
- 2020–2021: Casa Dorada Women Cycling
- 2022: Team Farto–BTC
- 2023–2024: Cofidis
- 2025–: Liv AlUla Jayco

Josie Talbot (born 9 August 1996) is an Australian professional cyclist, who currently rides for UCI Women's WorldTeam Liv AlUla Jayco, having joined on a two-year contract from UCI Women's Continental Team Cofidis.

== Major results ==
2013
1st Road race, Oceania Junior Road Championships
3rd Individual pursuit, UCI Junior World Track Championships
2014
UCI Junior World Track Championships

1st Team pursuit
3rd Points race
3rd Scratch

2017
5th White Spot / Delta Road Race
2018
2nd Road race, National Under-23 Road Championships
2022
1st Road race, Oceania Road Championships
5th Dwars door de Westhoek
6th La Picto–Charentaise
2023
3rd reVolta
2024
1st La Périgord Ladies
1st Stage 3 Tour Féminin International des Pyrénées
