= Courtney Field =

Australian cyclist (born 1997)

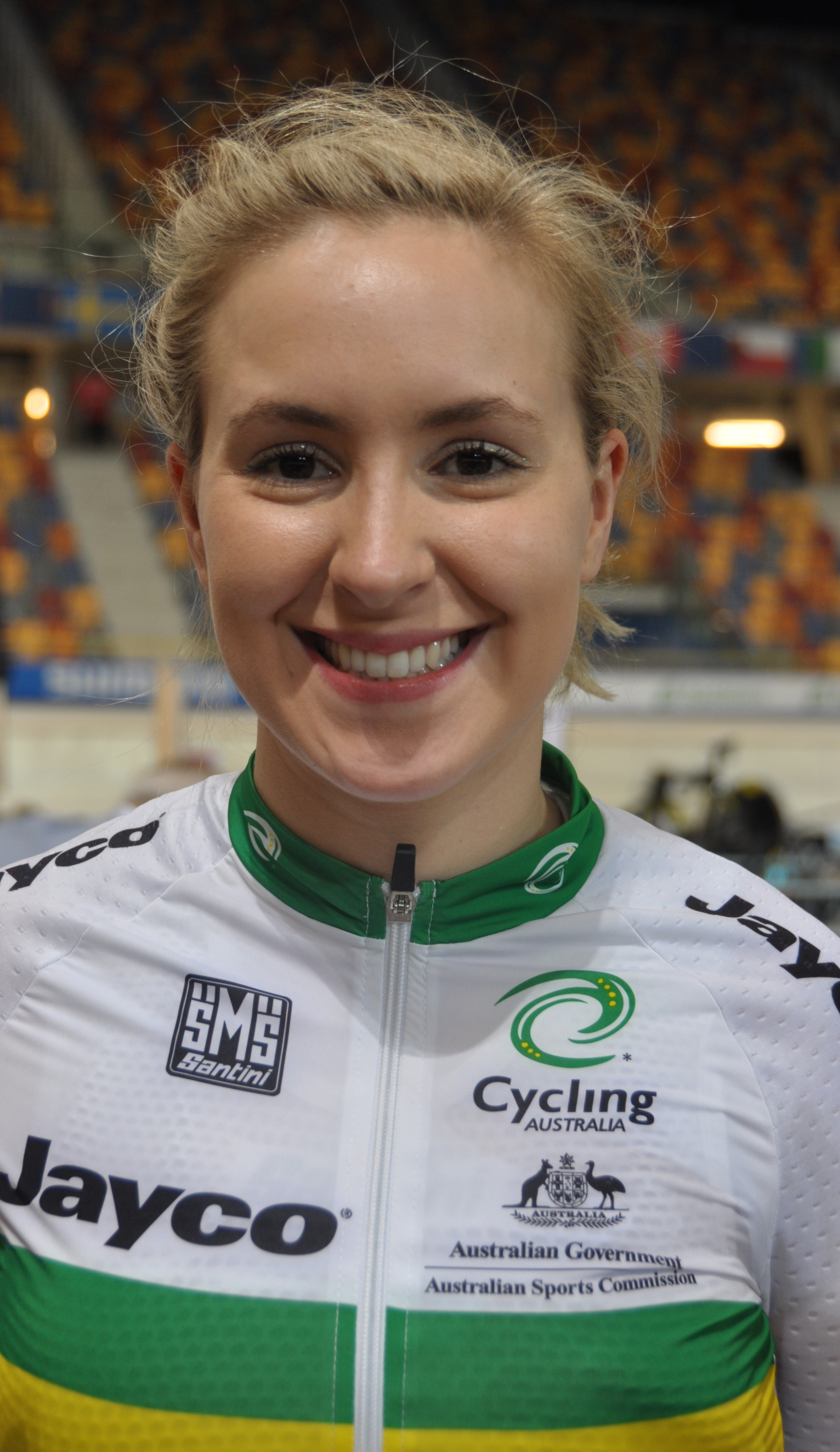
- Field in 2016

Personal information
- Full name: Courtney-Paige Field
- Born: 23 April 1997 (age 29) Melbourne, Australia
- Height: 166 cm (5 ft 5 in)
- Weight: 72 kg (159 lb)

Cycling career
- Sport: Cycling
- Discipline: Track cycling
- Rider type: Sprint

Major wins
- Junior World Champion - Individual Sprint

Courtney Field (born 23 April 1997) is an Australian female track cyclist who represented Australia in international competition. Field emerged as one of Australia's leading junior sprint cyclists in 2014 when she became the first Australian female rider to win the UCI Junior World Championship title in the sprint, achieving the feat in her first year in the junior category. The victory established her as a prominent prospect in Australian women's track cycling. In 2015, she won the silver medal in the sprint at the UCI Junior Track Cycling World Championships, before progressing to the elite ranks.

As a first-year elite rider, Field won the bronze medal in the keirin at the 2016–17 UCI Track Cycling World Cup, Round 1 in Glasgow. The following season, she finished second in the sprint at the Australian National Track Championships, earning selection for the 2017 UCI Track Cycling World Championships in Hong Kong, although she did not start.

Following her international cycling career, Field stepped away from elite competition to pursue business and personal interests. She relocated to Bunbury, Western Australia, where she co-founded the cycling café and bicycle shop Melo Velo, which she operated for eight years. During this period, she was also involved in residential property development.

In 2025, Field returned to Melbourne to undertake further study after spending eight years living in Bunbury, Western Australia. Following an extended period focused on business, family life and personal development, she recommitted to high-performance track cycling in 2026, marking the beginning of a new chapter in her sporting career.

== Major results ==
2006
1st Carnegie Interschool Sports - Egg and Spoon Race (Individual Sprint) - (Unverified)
2014
1st World Junior Track Championships (Individual sprint)
1st Oceania Junior Track Championships (500m time trial)
1st Oceania Junior Track Championships (Individual sprint)
1st National Junior Track Championships (500m time trial)
1st National Junior Track Championships (Keirin)
2015
Austral
(silver) 2nd Keirin
(silver) 2nd Sprint
2016
Oceania Track Championships

1st Team Sprint (with Rikki Belder)

(bronze) 3rd UCI Track Cycling World Cup - Glasgow - Elite Women Keirin
2017
1st Oceania Junior Track Championships (Team sprint)
(silver) 2nd Sprint, Austral
(silver) 2nd Elite National Track Championships (Individual sprint)
(bronze) 3rd Elite National Track Championships (Keirin)

2020
Certificate of Outstanding Achievement in Coffee Production- University of El Cafe, Mexico (Unverified)

1st Place- Lettuce Eating Championships, Barcelona (Unverified)

== See also ==
- Profile at Cycling Archives
