= 2YA2YAO! =

- Promotional logo

Single by Super Junior

from the album Timeless
- Language: Korean
- Released: January 28, 2020
- Recorded: 2019–20
- Studio: In Grid (Seoul)
- Genre: Hip-hop
- Length: 3:20
- Label: SM; Label SJ; Dreamus
- Composers: Dem Jointz; Pop Time; Zico
- Lyricist: Zico
- Producers: Dem Jointz; Zico

Super Junior singles chronology
"Super Clap" (2019)	"2YA2YAO!" (2020)	"The Melody" (2020)

Music video
- "2YA2YAO!" on YouTube
- "2YA2YAO!" (Performance version) on YouTube

"2YA2YAO!" (Korean pronunciation: [ijaijao]) is a song recorded by South Korean boy band Super Junior for their ninth Korean-language reissue album, Timeless. It was released on January 28, 2020, as the lead single for the repackaged album by SM Entertainment, Label SJ and it was distributed by Dreamus. The song was co-produced by Zico and Dem Jointz, who co-wrote it alongside Pop Time. The song's release marks Super Junior's first forage into the hip-hop genre since their debut in 2005.

In South Korea, the song peaked at number 188 on the Gaon Digital Chart and number 93 on K-pop Hot 100 chart within the first week of its release. In the United States, the song peaked at number 14 in Billboard's World Digital Song Sales.

== Background and release ==
"2YA2YAO!" features the vocals of eight active Super Junior members — Leeteuk, Yesung, Donghae, Shindong, Eunhyuk, Siwon, Ryeowook, and Kyuhyun. On August 30, 2019, Label SJ announced that Heechul will sit out of performances for their ninth album Time Slip and their headlining concert, Super Show 8: Infinite Time due to his ongoing injury issues with his leg. Heechul's vocals could still be heard in the main album (and its eventual reissue) and would still appear in the group's variety shows.

Super Junior embarked on their headlining concert Super Show 8 to promote their album starting with two shows in Seoul's KSPO Dome on October 12 and October 13.

On January 7, 2020, Label SJ announced that Super Junior would release their ninth repackaged album called Timeless with its release date scheduled for January 28. The label further announced that the title track will be written and composed by Block B's Zico and teased the fans that the group will be exploring a new musical style that has never been shown in their previous releases. Two days later, the group uploaded a teaser video on their YouTube channel showing the members are at a recording studio working on the song under Zico's supervision and revealing the song would be called "2YA2YAO!"

The song was digitally released alongside its music video and the repackaged album on January 28.

== Composition ==
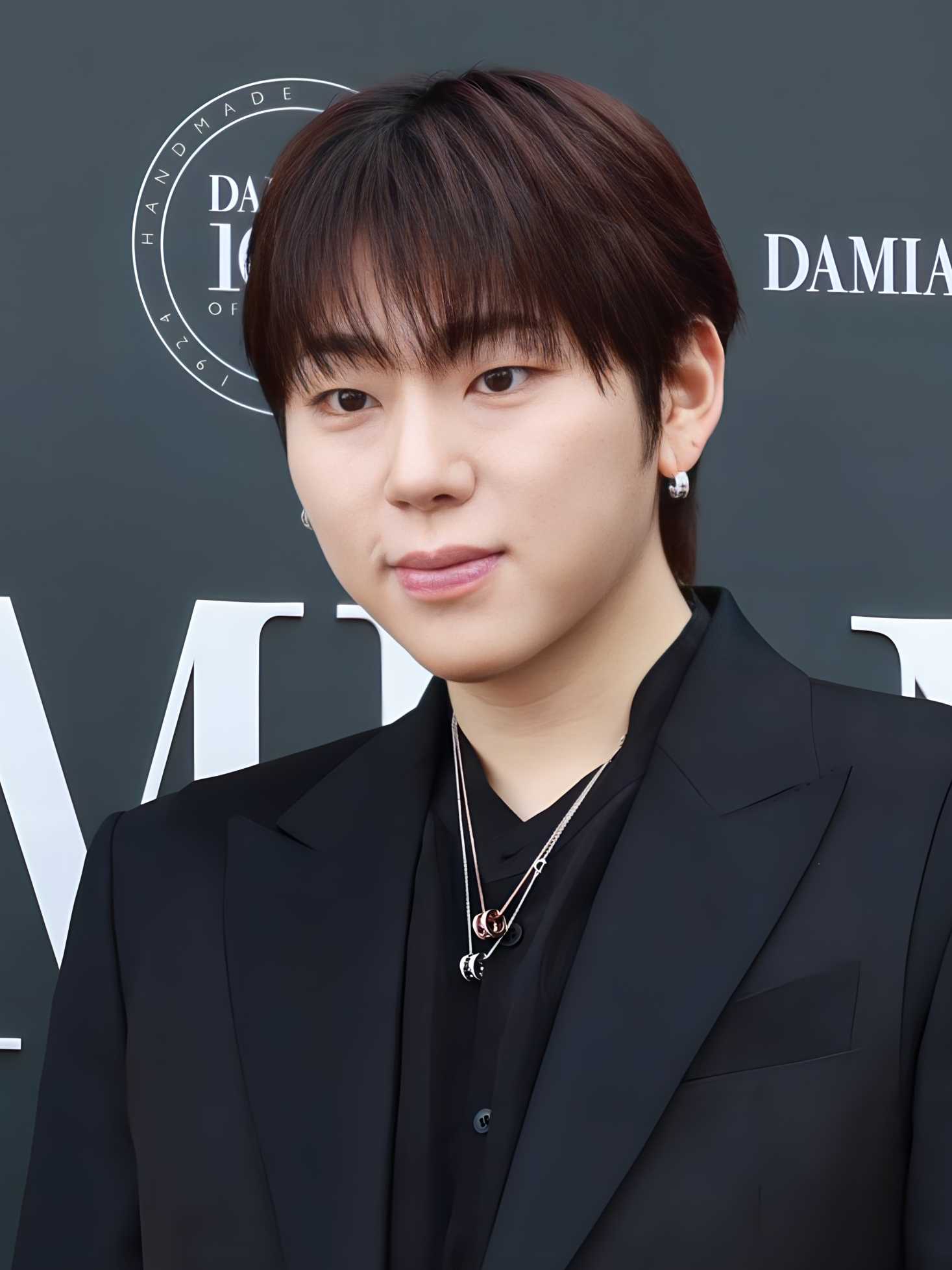
The song was co-produced and co-written by Block B's Zico (pictured in 2024)

"2YA2YAO!" is considered Super Junior's first attempt at the hip-hop genre, a departure from their most titular tracks that leaned into pop and R&B sounds, or more recently Latin-pop prior to the song's release.

Composed by Zico, Pop Time, and Dem Jointz, the song features rapid melody changes to focus on each Super Junior member's distinct sounds with some funk and synth-pop rhythm. It was composed in the key of G major with the tempo of 100 beats per minute.

The lyrics were solely penned by Zico himself. The lyrics narrate Super Junior's showmanship and their youth appeal despite the members' age were already above 30 at that point.

== Critical reception ==
Tamar Herman from Billboard gave the song a positive review describing it as "modern" and praised the lyrics of the song as it shows the group is still relatively young and full of potential.

CNN Indonesia also gave the song a positive review because it evokes a sense of fun from the listeners. They also praised the song's fair line distribution among each member.

== Commercial performance ==
The song debuted and peaked at number 188 on Gaon Digital Chart for the week of January 26–February 1, 2020. On the K-pop Hot 100 chart, the song entered and peaked number 93 where it spent a week on the chart.

In the United States' World Digital Song Sales chart, the song entered and peaked at number 14, where it spent two weeks on the chart.

== Music video ==
The music video for "2YA2YAO!" was released on January 28, 2020. The music video was described as "dark" and "dramatic", as the members faced the camera. The colors blue and red dominated the music video. An Indonesian news site VOI.id also described how the members looked charming and their looks befitting of hip-hop music.

== Promotion and live performances ==
The song was originally planned to be promoted live alongside the repackaged album with a studio audience at the group's "Super Junior The Stage" event on January 28, 2020, which eventually would be recorded behind closed doors owing to the COVID-19 concerns in South Korea.

The song was performed live for the first time at KBS World's Music Bank on January 31. That same evening, the song was performed virtually as part of the Beyond the Super Show setlist. The song would appear in the group's Super Show 9: Road concert setlist from 2022 to 2023.

== Credits and personnel ==
Credits adapted from the album's liner notes.

Studio

- In Grid Studio – recording, digital editing
- SM Lvyin Studio – engineered for mix
- Klang Studio – mixing
- The Mastering Palace – mastering

Personnel

- Label SJ – executive producer
- SM Entertainment – executive supervisor
- Lee Soo-man – producer
- Tak Young-jun – production director
- Yoo Young-jin – music and sound supervisor
- Super Junior – vocals
- Zico – producer, lyrics, composition, arrangement, background vocals, vocal directing
- Dem Jointz – producer, composition, arrangement
- Pop Time – composition, arrangement
- Dvwn – background vocals
- Babylon – background vocals
- Jeong Eun-kyung – recording, digital editing
- Kim Ji-hyun – recording
- Lee Ji-hong – engineered for mix
- Koo Jong-pil – mixing
- Dave Kutch – mastering

== Charts ==
=== Weekly charts ===
Chart performance for "2YA2YAO!"
Chart (2020)	Peak position
South Korea (Gaon)	188
South Korea (Billboard)	93
US World Digital Song Sales (Billboard)	14

== Release history ==
Release history for "2YA2YAO!"
Region	Date	Format	Label
Various	January 28, 2020	Digital download; streaming	SM; Label SJ; Dreamus
