= Rikki Belder =

Former Australian cyclist

Rikki Belder (born 2 July 1993) is a former Australian track sprint cyclist. She was the 2017 Oceania Champion in the 500m Team Sprint (with Holly Takos and Courtney Field), and has won six Australian Titles in the same event with fellow South Australian team members Anna Meares OAM and Stephanie Morton OAM.

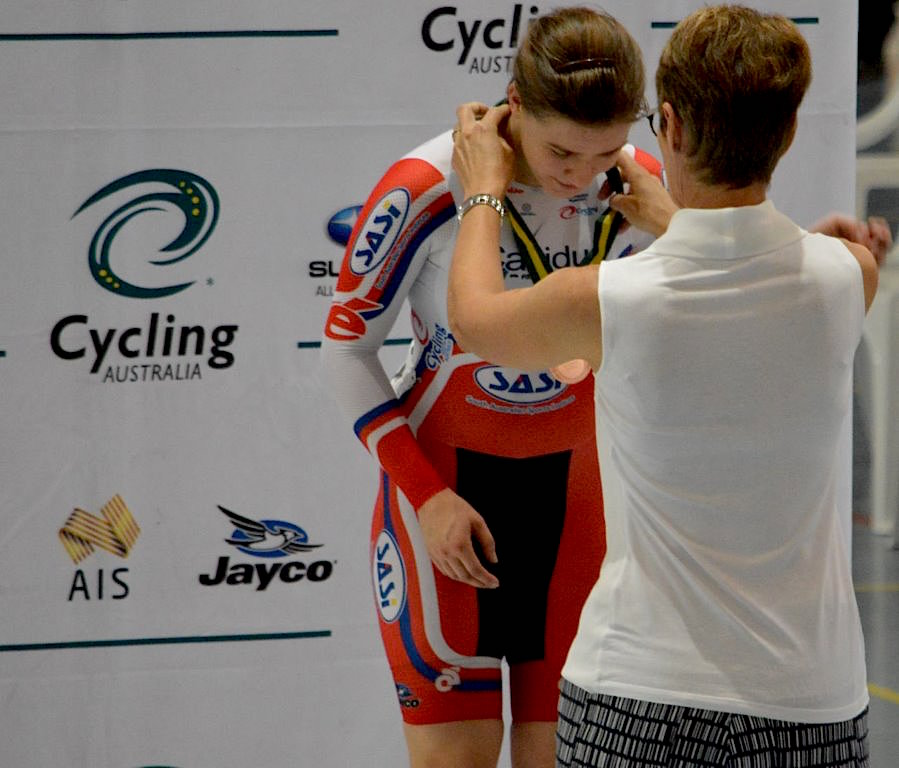
Belder receives Keirin bronze at the 2016 Subaru Cycling Australia Track National Championships

Belder holds the Australian Championship Record in the 500m Team Sprint (with Stephanie Morton). She represented Australia at the 2015 Union Cycliste Internationale – UCI Track Cycling World Cup III in Cali, Colombia, and at the 2017 Oceania Track Cycling Championships.

== Biography ==
Rikki Belder was born in Adelaide, South Australia on 2 July 1993. She was a scholarship holder at the South Australian Sports Institute (SASI) from 2011 - 2017. Belder studied Biomedical Engineering at Flinders University.

She is the daughter of Lyn and Gary Belder. Sister Donna Belder, held a PhD research scholarship in ornithology at the Fenner School of Environment and Society, Australian National University (ANU).

In 2014, Rikki Belder was listed as one of South Australia's Fastest-Rising Stars Under 30. Belder has completed some art work for charity.

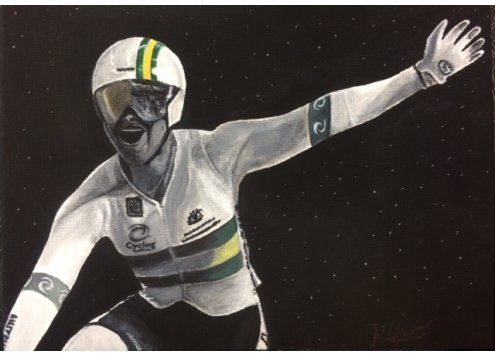
Painting by Rikki Belder of Australian track cyclist Anna Meares - auctioned to raise funds for the Little Heroes Foundation

== Palmares - Cycling ==
2018

- 1st 500m Team Sprint (With Morton and Takos) Australian National Championships QLD
- 3rd Keirin Australian National Championships QLD

2017

- 1st 500m Team Sprint (With Takos and Field) Oceania Championships VIC
- 1st 500m Team Sprint (With Morton and Takos) Australian National Championships QLD
- 2nd 500m Time Trial Australian National Championships QLD
- 4th Keirin Australian National Championships QLD
- 6th Sprint Oceania Championships VIC
- 6th Sprint Australian National Championships QLD
- 10th Keirin Oceania Championships VIC

2016

- 2nd 500m Team Sprint (With Hargrave) Australian National Championships SA
- 3rd Keirin Australian National Championships SA
- 3rd Keirin, ITS Melbourne Grand Prix

2015

- 1st 500m Team Sprint (With Meares and Morton) Australian National Championships VIC
- 1st 500m Time Trial Australian National Championships VIC
- 3rd Keirin Oceania Championships SA

3rd Keirin, Austral Wheelrace Carnival

2014

- 1st 500m Team Sprint (With Morton) Australian National Championships SA

Austral Wheelrace Carnival

1st Keirin
2nd Sprint

- 3rd Keirin Oceania Track Championships
- 3rd 500m Time Trial Oceania Track Championships

2013

- 1st 500m Team Sprint (With Morton) Australian National Championships NSW
- 2nd 500m Team Sprint (With Morton) Oceania Championships NSW
- 3rd 500m Time Trial Australian National Championships NSW

2012

- 1st 500m Team Sprint (With Meares) Australian National Championships SA
- 2nd 500m Time Trial Australian National Championships SA
- 2nd 500m Time Trial Oceania Championships NZL
- 2nd Team Sprint (With Falappi) Oceania Championships NZL

== Sponsorship ==
Belder was a GKA Sports Distribution (https://www.gkasports.com.au) supported athlete.
