= International Convention Center Jeju =

Building in Seogwipo, South Korea

Coordinates: 33°14′30″N 126°25′27″E

International Convention Center Jeju (ICC Jeju) opened in 2003 on Jeju Island, South Korea, in the Jungmun Resort near the city of Seogwipo. It began under private-public consortium ownership and is becoming fully publicly owned. It consists of a larger oval-shaped glass structure and a smaller round glass annex, and surrounding facilities. The largest hall accommodates 4,300 people, with various smaller halls and meeting rooms.

The building consists of a large elliptical fully glass-wall structure four floors above ground (and two below) connected to a smaller circular glass building housing restaurant and coffee shop, and is set on a cliff over the Pacific Ocean. The building houses the Jeju Convention Bureau.

In 2007 construction began on the adjoining 50,000 sq. meter lot to build a 600-room hotel-condominium to serve as ICC Jeju's "anchor hotel," scheduled to be completed in 2009.
