= Super Clap =

Single by Super Junior

from the album Time Slip
- Language: Korean
- Released: October 17, 2019
- Recorded: 2019
- Studio: MonoTree (Seoul); SM Yellow Tail (Seoul)
- Genre: Dance-pop; Nu-disco
- Length: 3:29
- Label: SM; Label SJ; Dreamus
- Composers: Sebastian Thott; Andreas Öberg; Ninos Hanna
- Lyricist: Lalala Studio
- Producer: Sebastian Thott

Super Junior singles chronology
"I Think I" (2019)	"Super Clap" (2019)	"2YA2YAO!" (2020)

Music videos
- "Super Clap" on YouTube

"Super Clap" (stylized as "SUPER Clap") is a song recorded by South Korean boy band Super Junior for their ninth Korean-language studio album, Time Slip. It was released on October 17, 2019 as the lead single for the album by SM Entertainment, Label SJ, and Dreamus. Produced by Sebastian Thott, the song was composed by Sebastian Thott, Andreas Öberg, and Ninos Hanna, with the lyrics penned by Ialala Studio.

The song peaked at number 83 on Gaon Digital Chart in South Korea in its first week on the chart. In the United States, the song peaked at number 20 on the World Digital Song Sales. An accompanying music video was released on October 17, 2019, three days after the album's release. The song has been performed in the group's headlining concert, Super Show 8.

== Background and release ==
"Super Clap" features the vocals of nine active Super Junior members — Leeteuk, Heechul, Yesung, Donghae, Shindong, Eunhyuk, Siwon, Ryeowook, and Kyuhyun.

During the band's appearance at HallyuPopFest on May 28, Leeteuk announced the band will release a new album in 2019, to celebrate the group's 15th anniversary.

On September 3, Super Junior began releasing teaser images to generate hype for the album's release on October 14. On September 30, the track listing for the album was announced on the group's social media channels, with "Super Clap" selected as the titular track. On October 10, the band released the second teaser for their music video.

Originally meant to coincide with the album's release on October 14, the song was digitally released alongside its music video on October 17, following the passing of labelmate Sulli.

== Composition ==
"Super Clap" is an energetic dance-pop song with an emphasis on clapping, synth, and brass sounds on top of a very fast beat. The song was composed by Sebastian Thott, Andreas Öberg, and Ninos Hanna. It was composed in the key of C major with the tempo of 140 beats per minute.

The lyrics were penned by the production team Lalala Studio. The lyrics invite listeners to take a respite from the harsh realities of life.

== Critical reception ==
Tamar Herman from Billboard gave the song a positive review, describing the song as "funky". She further stated that the release of the song "highlights Ryeowook and Yesung's vocals as the band's standout vocalists."

== Commercial performance ==
"Super Clap" debuted at number 83 on the Gaon Digital Chart for the week of October 13–19, 2019. The song was ranked at number 200 on the monthly Gaon Digital Chart for October 2019.

In the United States, the song entered World Digital Song Sales at number 20, where it spent a week on the chart.

== Music video ==
The music video for "Super Clap" was released on October 17, 2019. It was choreographed by Tony Testa, with whom the band had collaborated previously for the choreographies of "Mamacita" and "Devil". Described as "light-hearted", the video shows the band dancing across several different places, namely; an office, an arcade, and in front of a private plane.

It was later revealed that Heechul's appearance in the music video was limited due to health concerns.

== Promotion and live performances ==
The band promoted "Super Clap on KBS World's Music Bank on October 18 and 25. The band returned to Music Bank on December 20 to perform the song, alongside their previous hit, "Sorry, Sorry."

The song was featured in the band's eighth overall tour, Super Show 8: Infinite Time.

== Charts ==
=== Weekly charts ===
Chart performance for "Super Clap"
Chart (2019)	Peak position
South Korea (Gaon)	83
US World Digital Song Sales (Billboard)	20

=== Monthly charts ===
Monthly chart performance for Super Clap
Chart (2019)	Peak position
South Korea (Gaon)	200

== Credits and personnel ==
Credits adapted from the album's liner notes.

Studio

- MonoTree Studio – recording, digital editing
- SM Yellow Tail Studio – recording
- SM LVYIN Studio – engineered for mix
- SM Blue Ocean Studio – mixing
- The Mastering Palace – mastering

Personnel

- Label SJ – executive producer
- SM Entertainment – executive supervisor
- Lee Soo-man – producer
- Tak Young-jun – production director
- Yoo Young-jin – music and sound supervisor
- Super Junior – vocals
- Lalala Studio – lyrics
- Ninos Hanna – composition, background vocals
- Andreas Öberg – composition
- Sebastian Thott – producer, composition, arrangement
- Jo Hyung-won – background vocals
- G-High – vocal directing
- Noh Min-ji – recording
- Kang Sun-young – recording, digital editing
- Lee Ji-hong – engineered for mix
- Kim Cheol-sun – mixing
- Dave Kutch – mastering

== Release history ==
Release history for "Super Clap"
Region	Date	Format	Label
South Korea	October 17, 2019	Digital download; streaming	SM; Label SJ; Dreamus
Various	October 17, 2019	Digital download; streaming	SM; Label SJ
