= Time Slip (album) =

2019 studio album by Super Junior

- Digital and Group version cover

Studio album by Super Junior
- Released: October 14, 2019
- Recorded: 2019
- Studios: Doobdoob (Seoul); In Grid (Seoul); MonoTree (Seoul); SM Big Shot (Seoul); SM Blue Ocean (Seoul); SM LVYIN (Seoul); SM SSAM (Seoul)
- Genres: K-pop; Hip hop; Electronica; R&B
- Length: 35:05; 49:16 (repackaged edition)
- Language: Korean
- Labels: SM; Label SJ; Dreamus
- Producers: Lee Soo-man; Dem Jointz; Zico; Jake K; Varien; Deez; Rock-A-Tune; MRey; Sebastian Thott; JINBYJIN; Rovin; Hyuk Shin; Frants; Alexej Viktorovitch; Alexander Karlsson; Trippy; J-DUB; Oneway; Hwang Sung-jae

Super Junior chronology
One More Time (2018)	Time Slip (2019)	I Think U (2020)

Singles from Time Slip
- 1. "Show" Released: September 10, 2019; 2. "Somebody New" Released: September 17, 2019; 3. "The Crown" Released: September 27, 2019; 4. "I Think I" Released: October 4, 2019; 5. "Super Clap" Released: October 17, 2019

Timeless cover
- Digital cover

Singles from Timeless
- 1. "2YA2YAO!" Released: January 28, 2020

Time Slip (stylized as Time_Slip) is the tenth Korean-language studio album (eleventh overall) by South Korean boy band Super Junior, released on October 14, 2019, by SM Entertainment. The album features nine members, namely Leeteuk, Heechul, Yesung, Shindong, Eunhyuk, Donghae, Siwon, Ryeowook, and also marks the return of Kyuhyun after his mandatory military service. On January 7, 2020 it was announced that the album would be re-released as a repackaged album, Timeless on January 28, 2020.

== Background and release ==
Super Junior is a South Korean boy band that had thirteen members at its peak. At the release of their previous album, One More Time, the band has eleven members, with three of them being inactive; Kyuhyun due to military enlistment, Kangin because of his hiatus, and Sungmin, who voluntarily did not participate in group activities.

In May 2019, Kyuhyun finished his mandatory military enlistment, thus finishing-off the enlistment period of the band members that started since 2010, when the first member, Kangin, enlisted. In July 2019, Super Junior became a ten members band as Kangin announced his departure from the group after three years hiatus. As Sungmin continue to sit out of the group activity, Time Slip featured the remaining nine members of Super Junior. However, on August 30, Label SJ, Super Junior's music label announced that Heechul will not be joining the band in music show promotions and the album's supporting tour, Super Show 8 due to health issue but he will participate in other promotions.

Since the release of One More Time, some of the band members released their own albums; Ryeowook released a pop ballad mini album, Drunk on Love in January, Donghae and Eunhyuk through the sub-unit Super Junior-D&E released a pop mini album, Danger in April, Kyuhyun released a single album, The Day We Meet Again in May, and Yesung released a mini album, Pink Magic in June 2019. Super Junior started hinting on their comeback date by incorporating the number 999 in Super Junior-D&E's title track "Danger" and Yesung's "Pink Magic" music videos. On September 3, Super Junior posted cryptic concept images with the text "SUPER JUNIOR COMEBACK 999 : 00 : 00" on their social media accounts and website, that countdown to October 14, 2019 and announced it as their comeback date for their ninth album. Nine cryptic teaser images were released, one for each band member, who posed with different props while hiding their faces from camera.

The first single and its music video, "Show", was released on September 10, 2019. The single is a remake of Kim Won-jun's song with the same title that was released in 1996. The music video featured clips from the band's previous tour, Super Show 7 and its encore, Super Show 7S. On September 17, the music video for "Somebody New" was released. The song is described as a "medium tempo song that conveyed hopeful message to those who are facing difficulties". The music video features clips of the daily life of the band members and scenes in the practice room where they practice their choreography for the new album. The behind the scene of the music video was broadcast through episode 54 of SJ Returns Season 3, which was aired on October 20, 2019.

On September 27, 2019 the lyric video for the track "The Crown" was released. The song described the band's 15 years history and featured heavy bass and synth sound. The track list for Time Slip was released on September 30, revealing that the album will contain ten tracks altogether, with "Super Clap" as its lead single. It was also revealed that the album will be released in ten versions; nine versions for each band members and a group version. On October 4, they released the fourth music video of the album, "I Think I", which was co-written by band member, Eunhyuk. The song is a fusion of latin soul and pop R&B genre, a nod to their previous album, which is a latin pop EP; One More Time.

The album was released on October 14, 2019. However, due to the death of label-mate, Sulli, on the same day, the release of "Super Clap" music video was delayed. It was subsequently released on October 18.

On October 25, Label SJ announced the release of the special version of the album, Timeline. The special version was released on November 6 in celebration of their 14th debut anniversary.

== Promotion ==
=== Live performances ===
On August 26, Super Junior announced the renewal of the reality show SJ Returns for its third season, with the first episode to be broadcast on September 9, 2019 on Naver TV and V Live, ahead of their album release. The show centers around the processes of making the album, including tracks selection, studio recording sessions, choreography practices, and album cover and music video shooting.

The group made their comeback performances on the Korean music show, Music Bank, with the songs "I Think I" and "Super Clap", on October 18. They also made their appearance on Inkigayo and Show! Music Core.

On September 24, it was announced that Super Junior will be appeared as a full group for the variety show, Idol Room. On October 4, it was announced that Super Junior will appear as a full group on the 200th episode of Knowing Bros, which was set to air on October 12, 2019.

=== Super Show 8 ===
On October 12 and 13, the group embarked on the album supporting tour, Super Show 8 at the KSPO Dome in Seoul. The two days concert was sold out and attracted 18,000 audiences.

== Repackage album ==
On January 7, it was announced that Timeless, a repackage of Time Slip will be released on January 28, 2020 with its lead single being produced by Zico. Two days later, on January 9, 2020, the lead single's title, "2YA2YAO!" (Korean pronunciation: [ijaijao]), was revealed in a teaser video posted on SMTown YouTube channel. The video showed short clips of Zico monitoring the members of Super Junior while they were recording the track at a recording studio. The track is a hip hop song and was described as having addictive rhythm and witty lyrics.

Super Junior released a series of images on their social media accounts on January 9, which were dubbed as "story telling cards". It featured a poetry that described the band's journey and themed around the darkness and light. The promotional concept photos of Timeless were gradually released between January 13 to January 17, 2020. The group version featured the band members in dandy style while the individual photos were theme around shadow and bright. It was confirmed on January 15 that Timeless will be released in two versions; "Shadow" and "Bright".

Four new songs were included in the album; "2YA2YAO!", "Ticky Tocky", "Shadow" and "Rock Your Body".

== Sales and reception ==
The album received commercial success, recording 350,000 pre-orders and reaching number one on iTunes in 32 countries. Hanteo News reported that it recorded a first week sale of more than 270,000 copies, breaking the band's previous first week sale record by 215 percent, from the album Play. The album received its platinum album certification on December 12, 2019. On the year end Gaon chart Time Slip placed 9th, selling 427,647 copies throughout 2019.

The album's lead single "Super Clap" also won first place in weekly music shows M Countdown and Music Bank.

=== Critical reception ===
Professional ratings
Review scores
Source	Rating
Cultura	3.0/5 stars
The Kraze	8.7/10

Time Slip received positive reviews from critics. In the magazine The Kraze, it received the overall score of 8.7/10. Further score breakdown showed that the lead single "Super Clap" received 9/10, its music video received 8.5/10 and the album received 8.5/10 score. United Kpop magazine commented on the contrast between Time Slip and Timeless, stating that the former "gave a colourful and retro feel" while the latter's title track is "more serious and intense". Indonesian magazine, Cultura gave the album 3 out of 5 stars, citing that Super Junior through the album, managed to "keep their identity as an early generation boy band who are also able to create songs with modern arrangements".

== Track listing ==
Time Slip – Standard/Timeline version
No.	Title	Lyrics	Music	Arrangement	Length
1.	"The Crown"	Lee Yoo-jin; danke	Jake K; Nick Kaelar; Andy Love	Jake K; Nick Kaelar	3:39
2.	"Super Clap"	lalala Studio	Sebastian Thott; Andreas Oberg; Ninos Hanna	Sebastian Thott	3:29
3.	"I Think I"	January 8; Jo Yoon-kyung; Eunhyuk	Jo Yoon-kyung; Nermin Harambašić; Jakob Mihoubi; Rudi Daouk	Jo Yoon-kyung	3:21
4.	"Game"	ZNEE; Jung Ku-ru; Kim Ji-soo; Heechul; Eunhyuk	Davey Nate; ROVIN	ROVIN	3:37
5.	"Somebody New"	Seo Ji-eum	Hyuk Shin; MRey	Hyuk Shin; MRey	3:22
6.	"Skydive"	Lee Yoo-jin	FRANTS; Drew Ryan Scott; Sean Michael Alexander	FRANTS	3:56
7.	"Heads Up"	Jo Yoon-kyung	Alexander Karlsson; Alexej Viktorovitch; Sandra Lyng	JeL	3:17
8.	"Stay with Me"	seizetheday; Le'mon	Trippy; Le'mon	Trippy	3:11
9.	"No Drama" (performed by Leeteuk, Yesung, Eunhyuk, Ryeowook and Kyuhyun)	Leeteuk; Oneway	Leeteuk; Oneway	Oneway; Jamie Ilagan	3:18
10.	"Show"	Kim Dong-ryul	Kim Dong-ryul	Lee Jae-Myeong	3:50
Total length:					35:05

Timeless – Repackage
No.	Title	Lyrics	Music	Arrangement	Length
1.	"2YA2YAO!"	Zico	Zico; Dem Jointz; Pop Time	Zico; Dem Jointz; Pop Time	3:20
2.	"The Crown"	Lee Yoo-jin; danke	Jake K; Nick Kaelar; Andy Love	Jake K; Nick Kaelar	3:39
3.	"Ticky Tocky" (악몽; Ag-mong)	Hwang Yoo-bin	Jihad Rahmouni; Deez; Gregory G. Curtis II	Jihad Rahmouni; Deez	3:31
4.	"Shadow" (赤霞; Chì xiá)	Kim In-hyeong; Park Sung-hee	Hyuk Shin; Joony; MRey; Jeff Lewis; EVRYWHR	Joony; MRey	3:29
5.	"Super Clap"	lalala Studio	Sebastian Thott; Andreas Oberg; Ninos Hanna	Sebastian Thott	3:29
6.	"I Think I"	January 8; Jo Yoon-kyung; Eunhyuk	Jo Yoon-kyung; Nermin Harambašić; Jakob Mihoubi; Rudi Daouk	Jo Yoon-kyung	3:21
7.	"Game"	ZNEE; Jung Ku-ru; Kim Ji-soo; Heechul; Eunhyuk	Davey Nate; ROVIN	ROVIN	3:37
8.	"Somebody New"	Seo Ji-eum	Hyuk Shin; MRey	Hyuk Shin; MRey	3:22
9.	"Skydive"	Lee Yoo-jin	FRANTS; Drew Ryan Scott; Sean Michael Alexander	FRANTS	3:56
10.	"Heads Up"	Jo Yoon-kyung	Alexander Karlsson; Alexej Viktorovitch; Sandra Lyng	JeL	3:17
11.	"Stay with Me"	seizetheday; Le'mon	Trippy; Le'mon	Trippy	3:11
12.	"Rock Your Body" (performed by Yesung, Eunhyuk, Donghae and Ryeowook)	Donghae; J-Dub	Donghae; J-Dub	J-Dub	3:56
13.	"No Drama" (performed by Leeteuk, Yesung, Eunhyuk, Ryeowook and Kyuhyun)	Leeteuk; Oneway	Leeteuk; Oneway	Oneway; Jamie Ilagan	3:18
14.	"Show"	Kim Dong-ryul	Kim Dong-ryul	Lee Ja-myeong	3:50
Total length:					48:49

== Charts ==
=== Album ===
Weekly charts
Chart (2019–20)	Peak position
Japanese Albums (Oricon)	7
Japanese Digital Albums (Billboard)	5
South Korean Albums (Gaon)	1
US World Albums (Billboard)	9

Year-end charts
Chart (2019)	Position
South Korean Albums (Gaon)	9

=== Singles ===
"Super Clap" weekly charts
Chart (2019)	Peak position
South Korea (Gaon)	83
US World Digital Song Sales (Billboard)	20

"I Think I" weekly charts
Chart (2019)	Peak position
US World Digital Song Sales (Billboard)	19

"2YAY2YAO!" weekly charts
Chart (2020)	Peak position
South Korea (Gaon)	188
US World Digital Song Sales (Billboard)	14

== Accolades ==
=== Awards and nominations ===
Awards and nominations
Year	Award	Category	Result	Ref.
2020	34th Golden Disc Awards	Album Bonsang	Won	
2020	34th Golden Disc Awards	Album Daesang	Nominated	
2020	29th Seoul Music Awards	Bonsang Award	Won	
2020	29th Seoul Music Awards	Daesang Award	Nominated	

=== Music program awards ===
Song	Program	Date	Ref.
"Super Clap"
"Super Clap"	M Countdown (Mnet)	October 24, 2019	
"Super Clap"	Music Bank (KBS)	October 25, 2019	

== Release history ==
Release history for Time Slip
Region	Date	Format	Version	Label	Ref
South Korea	October 14, 2019	CD	Time Slip	SM; Label SJ; Dreamus	
Various	October 14, 2019	Digital download; streaming	Time Slip	SM; Label SJ	
South Korea	November 6, 2019	CD	Timeline	SM; Label SJ; Dreamus	
South Korea	January 28, 2020	CD	Timeless (repackage)	SM; Label SJ; Dreamus	
Various	January 28, 2020	Digital download; streaming	Timeless (repackage)	SM; Label SJ	
Taiwan	January 30, 2020	Digital download; streaming	Timeless (repackage)	Avex Taiwan	

== See also ==
- List of Gaon Album Chart number ones of 2020
