= MTV School Attack =

South Korean television series

MTV School Attack is a South Korean television program where pop stars perform surprise concerts at junior high and high schools in South Korea.

== Format ==
A typical episode of MTV School Attack begins with the host school summoning all students to an assembly. An administrator or teacher will then give a lecture which bores students. However, a siren will then start blaring while a School Attack banner is unveiled. The performers will then emerge from behind a stage or enter the facility and begin performing a medley of songs to the delight of students.

== Performers who have appeared on School Attack ==
- Big Bang
- F.T. Island
- Koyote
- Lee Hyori
- Rain
- Se7en
- 1TYM
- SG Wannabe
- Super Junior
- SHINee
- TVXQ
- 2PM
- 2NE1
- GOT7
- NCT
- Monsta X
- NU'EST W
- Pristin V
- Triple H
- Red Velvet
- Block B
- Wanna One
- Mamamoo
- Twice
- iKon
- Highlight
- (G)I-dle
