= Super Show 8: Infinite Time =

2019–20 concert tour by Super Junior

- world tour by Super Junior
- Promotional poster for the tour
- Location: Asia
- Associated albums: Time_Slip; I Think U
- Start date: October 12, 2019
- End date: February 16, 2020
- No. of shows: 16

Super Junior concert chronology
- Super Show 7 (2017–19); Super Show 8: Infinite Time (2019–20); Beyond the Super Show (2020)

Super Show 8: Infinite Time was the fifth Asia-wide concert tour and eighth tour overall by South Korean boy band Super Junior in support of their ninth studio album, Time_Slip. The world tour commenced with two shows in Seoul from October 12–13, 2019.

This tour marks the return of member Kyuhyun, who had been away serving two years of mandatory military service.

On August 30, Label SJ announced that Heechul would not be joining the tour due to ongoing health issues.

== Concerts ==
On August 27, 2019, Super Junior announced their dates for the tour Super Show 8, before the promotion of their ninth studio album, Time_Slip. On October 14, 2019, it was announced that the seats for their concert, which was held in the KSPO Dome on October 12–13, were sold out. It attracted 18,000 viewers for the two days.

On February 10, 2020, the tour promoter for the Malaysia stop, StarPlanet 星艺娱乐 released a statement saying that they would postpone the concert due to coronavirus proliferation concerns.

On May 31, 2020, Super Junior performed a special online live concert dubbed Beyond the Super Show, which was broadcast via Naver's V Live app as part of a joint project between SM and Naver called Beyond Live. Beyond Live concerts featured interactive fanlight sequences, augmented stage graphics, and multi-cam support for fans who wanted to focus on one specific member. Lucky audience members were able to show their faces to Super Junior in real-time using webcams. Beyond Live was not locked to a specific region or country, so international audience members could watch it at the same time as Koreans. Beyond the Super Show featured the same 8-member lineup as Super Show 8: Infinite Time and featured MAX from TVXQ as a special webcam guest.

== Setlist ==
"Superman" Pre-opening
Opening VCR

- "The Crown"
- "A Man in Love (Remix)"
- "Bonamana" (Rearranged)
- "Blue World" (Rearranged)

 ; First MENT
 ; VCR

- "Heads Up"
- "I Think I"
- "Sexy, Free, and Single" (Rearranged)
- "Mr. Simple"

 ; VCR

- "Opera"

 ; VCR

- "Love Disease" + "She's Gone" + "My All is In You"
- "Believe"
- "Somebody New"

 ; VCR

- "No Other"

 ; VCR (Rapping)

- "Rokkugo" (Hip-hop Version)
- "Hairspray" (Leeteuk + Siwon)
- KRY Dance Break
- "What Is Your Name" (D&E + Shindong)
- "Devil"
- "Full of Happiness"

 ; VCR

- "Shirt"
- "Disco Drive"
- "Super Clap"

 ; "Stay with Me" VCR + Behind the Scenes

- "Mamacita"
- "Black Suit"
- "Sorry, Sorry (Answer)" + "Sorry, Sorry"

Encore

- "Show"
- "Too Many Beautiful Girls"

 ; Ending MENT

Note: Certain songs are performed in their English versions in the Philippines and Japanese versions in Japan. These language variations apply only to selected songs, not the entire setlist.

== Tour dates ==
List of tour dates
Date	City	Country	Venue	Audience
October 12, 2019	Seoul	South Korea	KSPO Dome	—
October 13, 2019	Seoul	South Korea	KSPO Dome	—
November 2, 2019	Saitama	Japan	Saitama Super Arena	—
November 3, 2019	Saitama	Japan	Saitama Super Arena	—
November 4, 2019	Saitama	Japan	Saitama Super Arena	17,000
November 23, 2019	Bangkok	Thailand	Impact Arena	—
November 24, 2019	Bangkok	Thailand	Impact Arena	—
December 15, 2019	Pasay	Philippines	SM Mall of Asia Arena	—
January 11, 2020	Tangerang	Indonesia	Indonesia Convention Exhibition	—
January 18, 2020	Macau	China	Macau East Asian Games Dome	15,000
January 19, 2020	Macau	China	Macau East Asian Games Dome	15,000
February 7, 2020	Osaka	Japan	Maruzen Intec Arena Osaka	—
February 8, 2020	Osaka	Japan	Maruzen Intec Arena Osaka	—
February 9, 2020	Osaka	Japan	Maruzen Intec Arena Osaka	—
February 15, 2020	Fukuoka	Japan	Marine Messe Fukuoka	—
February 16, 2020	Fukuoka	Japan	Marine Messe Fukuoka	—
Total				N/A

=== Cancelled shows ===
List of cancelled dates
Date	City	Country	Venue	Reason	Ref.
March 1, 2020	Kuala Lumpur	Malaysia	Axiata Arena	COVID-19 pandemic	
March 25, 2020	Saitama	Japan	Saitama Super Arena	COVID-19 pandemic	
March 26, 2020	Saitama	Japan	Saitama Super Arena	COVID-19 pandemic	

== Personnel ==
- Artists: Super Junior members Leeteuk, Heechul, Yesung, Shindong, Eunhyuk, Donghae, Siwon, Ryeowook, Kyuhyun
- Tour organizer: SM Entertainment
- Tour promoter: Dream Maker Entertainment Limited, SM True Thailand, StarMac Entertainment Production Ltd, Pulp Live World, Dyandra Global Edutainment, Live Nation Global Touring
