= Gwangmyeong Speedom =

Velodrome in Gwangmyeong, South Korea

- 광명스피돔 (Gwangmyeong Seupidom)
- Interactive map of Gwangmyeong Speedom
- Location: Gwangmyeong, Gyeonggi, South Korea
- Coordinates: 37°28′0.77″N 126°50′42.40″E
- Owner: Korea Cycle Racing Association
- Operator: Seoul Olympic Sports Promotion Foundation
- Capacity: 10,863

Construction
- Groundbreaking: 2003
- Opened: 2006

The Gwangmyeong Speedom (Korean: 광명스피돔) is a velodrome in Gwangmyeong, South Korea. It opened in 2006, and has a seating capacity of 10,863 spectators. The venue was designed to resemble a racing cyclist's helmet; and is the largest domed structure ever built in South Korea.

== See also ==
- List of cycling tracks and velodromes
