= HallyuPopFest =

Korean pop music festival

- Location: Singapore; London, United Kingdom; Sydney, Australia
- Date: 2018 - present
- Website: hallyupopfest.com

HallyuPopFest (韩流巨星音乐节/韓流巨星音樂節/한류팝페스트) is a Korean pop music festival first held in Singapore from September 7 to 9, 2018. It was the largest K-Pop festival ever held in Southeast Asia, being the first of its kind in Singapore. The event featured 21 performing acts, showcasing 111 South Korean artists. It was held at the Singapore Indoor Stadium. The festival was first announced via a media release on May 24, 2018. The organizers at Singapore-based firm H.A.H. Entertainment promised "a strong base of fan favorites peppered with a few new faces."

In 2022, the festival kicked off its plans to go global, expanding into UK and Australia. The events were held a month apart at London's OVO Arena Wembley on July 9 and 10, and Sydney's Qudos Bank Arena on August 13 and 14. The festival was slated to be back in Asia in 2023, with an event at Macau's Wynn Palace and its return to Singapore at the Singapore Indoor Stadium, but were cancelled and indefinitely postponed respectively.

== HallyuPopFest 2018 ==
On May 25, 2018, it was announced that 3-day passes would be available for fans. Beginning June 1, H.A.H. Entertainment began announcing the artist lineup for HallyuPopFest via the festival's social media accounts.

HallyuPopFest 2018 had a number of activities lined up for ticket holders each day, starting with global auditions, showcases, artist engagement sessions involving hi-fives and group photos, a red carpet walk, and evening concerts. Fans who bought premium tickets could attend a meet and greet session and photo op.

Korean Entertainment companies Jellyfish Entertainment, Starship Entertainment and Cube Entertainment each took a day at HallyuPopFest to run global auditions for idol trainee spots in Korea. The audience was treated with more artist interactions during the afternoon showcases.

Both showcase artists and evening concert artists walked the red carpet outside Singapore Indoor Stadium for the day, made their way to a stage and answered a few questions from the media before proceeding along the carpet and posing for photographs. Fans lined the red carpet, interacting with their idols and handing them gifts.

At the end of the last evening concert, Eric Nam announced that HallyuPopFest would be back for 2019.

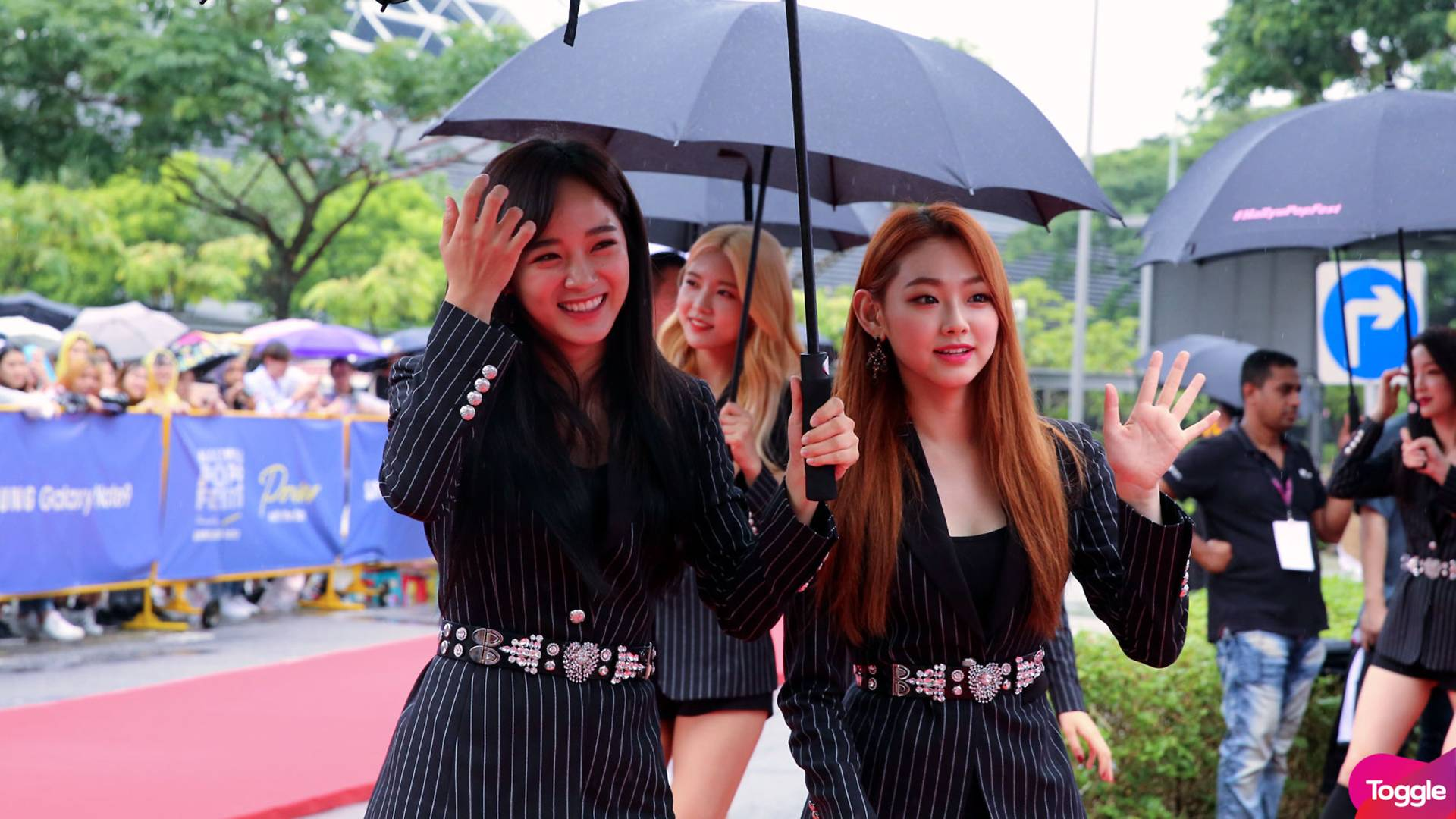
gugudan walking the red carpet at HallyuPopFest 2018

With the Red Carpet Walk held outdoors, Day 1's Red Carpet was almost cancelled due to rain, but the artists continued to walk, carrying umbrellas.

=== Artist line-up ===
The artist lineup consists of: BtoB, Soyou, Gugudan, Jeong Se-woon, Yoo Seung-woo, Dreamcatcher, Myteen, Apink, Eric Nam, Huh Gak, EXID, Victon, ONF, Snuper, NCT 127, Taeyeon (Girls' Generation), AOA, UNB, Momoland, Heize, and Wanna One.

Afternoon Showcase
Date	Artist Name
Fri, Sep 7	Yoo Seung-woo
Fri, Sep 7	Gugudan
Sat, Sep 8	Jeong Se-woon
Sat, Sep 8	Momoland
Sun, Sep 9	Dreamcatcher
Sun, Sep 9	Myteen

Evening Concert
Day 1 (Fri, Sep 7)	Day 2 (Sat, Sep 8)	Day 3 (Sun, Sep 9)
Eric Nam (Host)	Eric Nam (Host)	Eric Nam (Host)
Wanna One	Wanna One	Taeyeon (Girls' Generation)
Apink	EXID	BTOB
Huh Gak	AOA	NCT 127
Victon	Soyou	Heize
Momoland	ONF	UNB
	Snuper	Dreamcatcher

== HallyuPopFest 2019 ==
It was announced on January 30, 2019, that HallyuPopFest 2019 will be happening on Saturday, May 25 and Sunday, May 26. The festival will once again be held at Singapore Indoor Stadium.

Returning for its second edition, HallyuPopFest establishes itself as South East Asia's largest K-pop festival that aims to bring fans closer to their favourite Korean stars. Just like last year, the festival will feature afternoon showcases, evening concerts, red carpet events and fan engagement opportunities.

No doubt that HallyuPopFest is a high-rated and well-anticipated K-pop festival, especially for K-pop fans in Singapore:

"If you could only choose one music festival to go to this year, HallyuPopFest is one not to be missed for K-pop fanatics. Returning for its sophomore edition in Singapore, the mega two-day extravaganza is back with an unstoppable lineup of big-name stars as well as up-and-coming acts that are all set to bring the house down this May."

An exciting addition to this year's festival will be an all-new HallyuTown segment, which will be open to the public, including non-ticket holders. There will be a variety of booths to enjoy, ranging from K-Food to K-Beauty, K-Lifestyle and many more. There will also be a dedicated area for fan support - merchandise and goods that fans make themselves to support their idols.

The HallyuTown will also function as the main festival square where the daily Red Carpet event will be held. The Red Carpet event is free and open to the public. It was also announced that all artists will be walking the red carpet this year.

=== Artist line-up ===
One of K-pop's biggest names, Super Junior, will be the headlining act, along with 14 other established and up-and-coming K-pop groups such as: A.C.E, GWSN, N.Flying, Oh My Girl, NU'EST, Hyolyn, Winner, Verivery, Kanto, Trei, (G)I-DLE, Kard, Pentagon and Monsta X.

Afternoon Showcase
Date	Artist Name
Sat, May 25	A.C.E
Sat, May 25	GWSN
Sun, May 26	Verivery
Sun, May 26	Kanto
Sun, May 26	TREI

Evening Concert
Day 1 (Sat, May 25)	Day 2 (Sun, May 26)
N.Flying	(G)I-DLE
Oh My Girl	Kard
NU'EST	Pentagon
Hyolyn	Monsta X
Winner	Super Junior
GWSN	

== HallyuPopFest 2022 ==
=== HallyuPopFest London ===
HallyuPopFest announced its return with the 3rd edition of the festival on April 1, 2022. The event also revealed its plans to travel to a new city, expanding outside of Singapore for the first time. After the release of several teasers on the festival's social media, it was officially announced that the event would be held at OVO Arena Wembley in London on July 9 and 10, 2022.

"HallyuPopFest was the biggest K-Pop event, and the first ever K-Pop festival, to ever happen in the UK, with a total of 14 K-Pop acts in attendance, split with seven artists performing each day, with two acts each night taking to the stage twice to perform a set at both the Artist Showcase and Evening Concert." Due to popular demand, the festival also released livestream tickets for fans around the world to get a chance to catch the performances of their favourite artists online.

=== Artist line-up ===
On April 13, 2022, HallyuPopFest began announcing its first wave of artists including Astro, Mamamoo's Hwasa, SF9, Everglow, Oneus, Cravity. The headlining acts were announced on May 6, 2022, to be Chen and Kai from one of K-Pop's biggest groups, Exo.

Artist Showcase
Day 1 (Sat, July 9)	Day 2 (Sun, July 10)
Sam Kim	Weeekly
P1Harmony	Paul Kim

Evening Concert
Day 1 (Sat, July 9)	Day 2 (Sun, July 10)
Sam Kim	Paul Kim
P1Harmony	Weeekly
Oneus	Cravity
Everglow	CIX
Astro	Kep1er
Hwasa	SF9
Chen	Kai

=== HallyuPopFest Sydney ===
Following its London debut, the festival further revealed that it was making its way to Sydney's Qudos Bank Arena on August 13 and 14, 2022. On top of five-act concerts on each night, the two-day event featured a red carpet event, Hi-Wave meet and greet sessions and HallyuTown.

Stuart Ayres, Minister for Tourism and Minister for Western Sydney said “The opportunity to see some of the world’s best K-pop acts and attend meet and greet sessions with the artists will be a once-in-a-lifetime experience for thousands of fans who will be drawn to Western Sydney, providing a significant boost to the local visitor economy."

=== Artist line-up ===
Along with the festival announcement, all 10 artists in the lineup were released on June 22, 2022. The star-studded list features headliners Exo's Chen and Kai alongside Astro, Chungha, SF9, Oh My Girl, Everglow, Oneus, P1Harmony and Kep1er.

Evening Concert
Day 1 (Sat, August 13)	Day 2 (Sun, August 14)
P1Harmony	Kep1er
Everglow	Oneus
Chungha	Oh My Girl
SF9	Astro
Chen	Kai

== HallyuPopFest 2023 ==
=== HallyuPopFest Macau ===
On August 23, 2023, it was announced that HallyuPopFest would be heading to the city of Macau. The festival was scheduled to be held at Wynn Palace on October 21 and 22, 2023. However, on September 25, the organisers announced that it would be cancelled, and those who purchased tickets would be fully refunded.

=== Artist line-up ===
On the same day of announcement, HallyuPopFest announced its lineup of artists including Hyolyn, Sam Kim, Omega X, Nine to Six, Kard, Verivery, Cherry Bullet and H1-Key, with the first and second shows to be headlined by NCT Dream and Shinee respectively.

Evening Concert
Day 1 (Sat, October 21)	Day 2 (Sun, October 22)
Hyolyn	Kard
Sam Kim	Verivery
Omega X	Cherry Bullet
Nine to Six	H1-Key
NCT Dream	Shinee

=== HallyuPopFest Singapore ===
On August 30, 2023, it was further revealed that HallyuPopFest would be returning to Singapore, to be held at the Singapore Indoor Stadium on November 12, 2023. On top of the evening concert, the event consists of red carpet, hi-wave and photo-taking events. However, on September 25, the organisers announced that the event would be postponed indefinitely, and those who purchased tickets would similarly be fully refunded.

=== Artist line-up ===
All artists in the lineup were unveiled along with the festival announcement, featuring headliner Taeyang, joined by SF9, Kwon Eun-bi, Kep1er and DKZ.

Evening Concert
Day 1 (Sun, November 12)
SF9
Kwon Eun-bi
Kep1er
DKZ
Taeyang
