= Changing Majors =

South Korean web series

- Korean logo
- Hangul: 전과자
- RR: Jeongwaja
- MR: Chŏnkwaja
- Genre: Variety show
- Starring: Lee Chang-sub; Kai
- Country of origin: South Korea
- Original language: Korean
- No. of seasons: 9
- No. of episodes: 137

Production
- Camera setup: Multi-camera
- Running time: 30 minutes
- Production company: Ootb Studio

Original release
- Network: YouTube
- Release: November 11, 2022 – present

Changing Majors (Korean: 전과자) is a South Korean variety web series featuring various universities, colleges and schools, and the courses offered inside. Produced by Kakao Entertainment's subsidiary ootb (Out of the Box) Studio, each episode of the series would be released at 18:00 (KST) on Thursdays through the company's YouTube channel.

ENA aired selected past episodes of the series that were re-processed for television, every Friday beginning May 23, 2025, for 10 weeks.

The series starred Lee Chang-sub of BtoB for the first five seasons, and Kai of Exo beginning season 6.

== Cast ==
- Lee Chang-sub (BtoB) (Seasons 1–5)
- Kai (Exo) (Season 6–present)

== Episodes ==
=== Season 1 ===
List of episodes in Season 1

Ep.	Upload Date	Featured University/School	Featured Department	Remarks
0	November 9, 2022	—N/a		Behind of Episode 1
1	November 11, 2022	Dongguk University	Police Administration	
2	November 18, 2022	Hankuk University of Foreign Studies	Thai Language	
3	November 25, 2022	Induk University	Broadcast & Entertainment	Appearance by Shin Hyun-joon, who is a teaching professor in the university
4	December 1, 2022	Konkuk University	Veterinary Medicine	
5	December 8, 2022	Catholic University of Korea	Psychology	
6	December 15, 2022	Sahmyook University	Physical Therapy	
7	December 22, 2022	Bucheon University	Airline Services	
8	January 5, 2023	Osan University	e-Sports	Appearance by Byeon Sung-chul, who is a teaching professor in the university
9	January 12, 2023	Yong In University	Physical Education	Appearance by Jang Mi-ran, who is a teaching professor in the university
10	January 19, 2023	Howon University	—N/a	Practical Music MT
11	January 26, 2023	Howon University	—N/a	Practical Music MT
12	February 16, 2023	Seoul National University	Broadcasting Club	Winter Vacation Special Spin-off; Special Guest: Key (Shinee)
13	February 23, 2023	Korea University	Cheerleaders Squad	Winter Vacation Special Spin-off
14	March 2, 2023	Dankook University	Stock Trading Club	Winter Vacation Special Spin-off
15	March 9, 2023	Chung-Ang University	Theater Club	Winter Vacation Special Spin-off

=== Season 2 ===
List of episodes in Season 2

Ep.	Upload Date	Featured University/School	Featured Department	Remarks
16	March 23, 2023	Yonsei University	Business Administration	
17	March 30, 2023	Pusan National University	Mechanical Engineering	
18	April 6, 2023	Kyung Hee University	Physics	Appearance by Kim Sang-wook, who is the head of the university's Department of Physics
19	April 13, 2023	Seokyeong University	Hair Design	
20	April 24, 2023	Soongsil University	Architecture	Delayed release from the supposed release date of April 20, 2023 in light of the death of Moonbin
21	April 27, 2023	Sungkyunkwan University	Media Communication	Surprise appearances by the remaining BtoB members
22	May 4, 2023	Yeonsung University	Companion Animal Health	
23	May 11, 2023	Ajou University	Nursing	
24	May 25, 2023	Hansung University	Fashion Design	
25	June 1, 2023	Korea Hotel & Tourism Technical College	Hotel Culinary Arts	Appearances by Lee Yeon-bok and Jung Ho-young, who are teaching professors in the college
26	June 8, 2023	Korea Army Academy at Yeongcheon	—N/a	Commemoration of 500,000 Subscribers
27	June 15, 2023	Hanyang University	Material Science and Engineering	
28	June 22, 2023	University of Seoul	Urban Administration	
29	June 29, 2023	Korea Maritime and Ocean University	Navigation Science	
30	July 6, 2023	Kyungin Women's University	Early Childhood Education	
31	July 13, 2023	Kookmin University	—N/a	University Volunteer Work Program in Rural Areas

=== Season 3 ===
List of episodes in Season 3

Ep.	Upload Date	Featured University/School	Featured Department	Remarks
32	September 21, 2023	Sogang University	Mathematics	
33	September 25, 2023	Hongik University	Fine Arts	
34	September 28, 2023	Kyung Hee University	Korean Medicine	
35	October 5, 2023	Korea University	Philosophy	
36	October 19, 2023	Korea National University of Agriculture and Fisheries	Horse Industry	
37	October 26, 2023	Hanseo University	Helicopter Operations	
38	November 2, 2023	Howon University	Practical Music	Appearances by Kim Jae-seok and Shin Yon-a (Big Mama), who are teaching professors in the university
39	November 9, 2023	University of Hong Kong	—N/a	Commemoration of 1,000,000 Subscribers
40	November 16, 2023	University of Hong Kong	Korean Studies	Commemoration of 1,000,000 Subscribers
41	November 23, 2023	Kookmin University	Law	
42	November 30, 2023	Sejong University	Hotel and Tourism Management	
43	December 7, 2023	Kyungmin University	Fire and Safety Management	
44	December 14, 2023	KAIST	Aerospace Engineering	
45	December 28, 2023	Inha University	Biotechnology	
46	January 4, 2024	Hanyang University Education Research Industry Cluster at Ansan	Dance	
47	January 11, 2024	—N/a		Finals Exam; Professors' Q&A (Note: With the following professors: Lee Sang-won (Konkuk University Veterinary Medicine department professor; previously appeared in episode 4); Kim Hyoun-woo (Hanyang University Material Science and Engineering department professor; previously appeared in episode 27); Lee Dong-ki (Kookmin University Law department dean; previously appeared in episode 41)); Pop-up Store Mission

=== Season 4 ===
List of episodes in Season 4

Ep.	Upload Date	Featured University/School	Featured Department	Remarks
48	March 28, 2024	Ajou University	—N/a	Department of Pharmacy Orientation Program
49	April 4, 2024	Hanyang University	Vocal Music	Appearance by Ko Seong-hyeon, who is a teaching professor in the university
50	April 11, 2024	Chung-Ang University	Political Science	
51	April 18, 2024	Ewha Womans University	Ceramic Arts	
52	April 25, 2024	Seoul National University	Nuclear Engineering	
53	May 2, 2024	Osaka University	Applied Science and Engineering	
54	May 9, 2024	—N/a		Part-time Work; Experience in Universal Studios Japan
55	May 16, 2024	Korea Aerospace University	Drone Engineering	
56	May 23, 2024	Seoul National University of Education	Elementary Education	
57	May 30, 2024	Yeonsung University	Webtoon Contents	
58	June 6, 2024	Pukyong National University	Marine Sports	
59	June 13, 2024	Gachon University, Medical Campus	Dental Hygiene	
60	June 20, 2024	Korean National Police University	—N/a	
61	June 27, 2024	Woosong University	Railroad Studies	
62	July 4, 2024	Korea Air Force Academy	—N/a	Commemoration of 1,500,000 Subscribers
63	July 11, 2024	Incheon National University	—N/a	Seasonal Semester
64	August 22, 2024	—N/a	—N/a	2024 Changing Majors Union MT Special (Note: With the following undergraduates that had previously appeared in the series: Go Jung-min (Episode 9 - Yong In University Physical Education department); Song Seong-hyun (Episode 24 - Hansung University Fashion Design department); Jo Su-hyeon (Episode 44 - KAIST Aerospace Engineering department); Jung Yoon (Episode 48 - Ajou University Pharmacy department); Jo Joon-gi (Episode 49 - Hanyang University Vocal Music department); Jeong Mun-sik (Episode 52 - Seoul National University Material Science department); Kim Da-hyun (Episode 56 - Seoul National University of Education Elementary Education department); Maria Moldrick (Episode 57 - Hankuk University of Foreign Studies Korean Language Education department; from Sweden); Choi Jun-hee (Episode 58 - Pukyong National University Marine Sports department))
65	August 29, 2024	—N/a	—N/a	2024 Changing Majors Union MT Special

=== Season 5 ===
List of episodes in Season 5

Ep.	Upload Date	Featured University/School	Featured Department	Remarks
66	September 26, 2024	Kyung Hee University	Theater and Film	
67	October 3, 2024	Hankuk University of Foreign Studies	Arabic Language	
68	October 10, 2024	Korea National Open University	Sports for All	Appearances by Ryu Seung-min, and Kim Yeon-koung who is currently an enrolled student in the university
69	October 17, 2024	Dankook University	Creative Writing	
70	October 24, 2024	Pohang University of Science and Technology	Computer Science	
71	November 7, 2024	Eulji University	Paramedic	
72	November 14, 2024	Seoul National University of Science and Technology	Visual Design	
73	November 21, 2024	Myongji University	Chinese Language and Literature	
74	November 28, 2024	Seokyeong University	Modeling & Acting	
75	December 5, 2024	Chugye University for the Arts	Orchestral	
76	December 12, 2024	Jeju National University	Tourism Management	
77	December 19, 2024	Ajou University	Pharmacy	
78	December 26, 2024	Mokpo National University	Naval Architecture and Ocean Engineering	
79	January 5, 2025	Chung-Ang University	Social Welfare	Delayed release from the supposed release date of January 2, 2025 in light of the Jeju Air Flight 2216 accident
80	January 8, 2025	Seoul National University Graduate School of Dentistry	Dentistry	Lee Chang-sub's final episode before his graduation from the show

=== Season 6 ===
List of episodes in Season 6

Ep.	Upload Date	Featured University/School	Featured Department	Remarks
81	March 27, 2025	KAIST	Chemistry	First episode with Kai as the main host
82	April 3, 2025	Yong In University	Martial Arts	
83	April 10, 2025	Sogang University	English Language and Literature	
84	April 17, 2025	Konkuk University	ROTC	Special appearance by Kim Dong-jun
85	April 24, 2025	Jeju National University	Aquatic Life Medicine	
86	May 1, 2025	Sangmyung University	Food & Nutrition	
87	May 8, 2025	Hongik University	Student Council	Special appearance by Kang Hyeun-seok
88	May 22, 2025	Korea Broadcasting Art School	Voice Acting	Special appearances by Kang Soo-jin and Jang Gyeong-hee
89	May 29, 2025	Hanyang University College of Education	Korean Language Education, Art Education	
90	June 5, 2025	Korea Tourism College	Hotel Baking & Pastry	
91	June 12, 2025	Yonsei University	Electrical and Electronic Engineering	
92	June 19, 2025	Korea University	Korean Literature	
93	June 26, 2025	Woosong University	Liberal Studies	
94	July 3, 2025	Kookmin University	Ballet	
95	July 24, 2025	Seoul National University	Insect Club	Summer Vacation Special 1 Special Guest: Ten (NCT, WayV)
96	July 31, 2025	Seongbuk Senior Welfare Center	—N/a	Summer Vacation Special 2 Special Guest: Ralral
97	August 28, 2025	Seokyeong University	Military Science	Summer Vacation Special 3 Special Guest: Jang Won-young (Ive)

=== Season 7 ===
List of episodes in Season 7

Ep.	Upload Date	Featured University/School	Featured Department	Remarks
—N/a	September 18, 2025	—N/a		Course Registration Special
98	September 25, 2025	Inha Technical College	Airline Service Management	Special Host: Suho (Exo); Kai is absent due to clash of schedules
99	October 2, 2025	Sungkyunkwan University	Classical Chinese	
100	October 16, 2025	Dongguk University	Correctional Science	Special Guest: Lee Chang-sub (BtoB)
101	October 23, 2025	—N/a		Jeongwadate Season 1 Episode 1 (Note: With the following undergraduates: Choi Eun-bi (Ewha Womans University Ceramic Arts department; previously appeared in episode 51); Yoon Shin-hyul (Sungkyunkwan University Classical Chinese department; previously appeared in episode 99); Han Seung-heon (Sungkyunkwan University Classical Chinese department; previously appeared in episode 99); Oh Ji-seok (Sungkyunkwan University Classical Chinese department; previously appeared in episode 99); Oh Yoo-na (Ewha Womans University Ceramic Arts department); Ha Ye-rim (Ewha Womans University Ceramic Arts department)); Special Host: Lee Chang-sub (BtoB)
102	October 30, 2025	University of Seoul	Sculpture Science	Special Guest: D.O. (Exo)
103	November 6, 2025	Kyungbok University	Clinical Laboratory Science	
104	November 13, 2025	Kyonggi University	Japanese Language and Literature	
105	November 20, 2025	Korea Hotel & Tourism Technical College	Hotel Food & Beverage Management	Special Guest: Chaeryeong (Itzy)
106	November 27, 2025	—N/a		Jeongwadate Season 1 Episode 2 (Note: With the following undergraduates: Park Seung-min (Yonsei University Business Administration department); Shin Min-seo (Korea University Business Administration department); Han Dae-yoon (Yonsei University Business Administration department); Kwon Do-hoon (Yonsei University Business Administration department); Kim Joon-ho (Yonsei University Business Administration department); Yoon Eun-seo (Korea University Business Administration department); Kim Ru-bin (Korea University Business Administration department); Lee Ji-ah (Korea University Business Administration department)); Special Host: Lee Chang-sub (BtoB)
107	December 4, 2025	Chung-Ang University	Advertising and Public Relations	
108	December 11, 2025	Daegu Gyeongbuk Institute of Science and Technology	Brain Sciences	Special Guest: Kim Jae-hyeok (Orbit)
109	December 18, 2025	—N/a		Jeongwadate Season 1 Episode 3 (Note: With the following undergraduates: Kim Sang-do (Hanyang University Mechanical Engineering department); Park Eun-bi (Hongik University Korean Language and Literature department); Jung Jin-ho (Hanyang University Mechanical Engineering department); Kim Pu-reum (Hanyang University Mechanical Engineering department); Jung Hyun-jun (Hanyang University Mechanical Engineering department); Kim Jun-ah (Hongik University Korean Language and Literature department); Park Sung-hye (Hongik University Korean Language and Literature department); Ahn Hyo-won (Hongik University Korean Language and Literature department)); Special Host: Lee Chang-sub (BtoB)
110	January 8, 2026	—N/a		Jeongwadate Season 1 Episode 4 - International Students (Note: With the following undergraduates: Kim Joon-ho (Yonsei University Business Administration department; previously appeared in episode 106); Kim Ga-yun (Yonsei University Business Administration department); Nachi Arakaki (Yonsei University English Language and Literature department exchange student; from Japan); Chen Si Hao (Kyung Hee University Media Studies department; from Taiwan); Namuundelger Enkhtuvshin/Han Na Na (Yonsei University Biotechnology department; from Mongolia); Birken Michael Silitch/Lee Ji Sang (Yonsei University Artificial Intelligence department; from United States); Leon Strömvall (Seoul National University Korean Language and Literature department exchange student; from Sweden); Khasbaatar Rentsendorj/Jack (Korea University Global Entertainment department; from Mongolia)); Special Hosts: Lee Chang-sub (BtoB), Chuu; Kai is absent due to clash of schedules
111	January 22, 2026	—N/a		Jeongwadate Season 1 Episode 5 (Note: With the following undergraduates: Ji Sun-jun (Korea National Sport University Physical Education department); Song Ah-young (Yonsei University College of Music); Choi Ye-rin (Yonsei University College of Music); Kim Min-seon (Yonsei University College of Music); Kang Ji-won (Yonsei University College of Music); Kim Su-gyo (Korea National Sport University Physical Education department); Tae Min-jae (Korea National Sport University Physical Education department); Kim Hyo-bin (Korea National Sport University Physical Education department)); Special Host: Sehun (Exo)
112	February 5, 2026	—N/a		Jeongwadate Season 1 Episode 6 (Note: With the following undergraduates: Lee Gyu-won (Seoul National University Aerospace Engineering department); Song Si-hyun (KAIST Biochemical Engineering department); Wang Hee-chan (Seoul National University Aerospace Engineering department); Kim Joon-hee (Seoul National University Aerospace Engineering department); Lee Nam-yong (Seoul National University Aerospace Engineering department); Kim Bo-bin (KAIST Biochemical Engineering department); Jo Soo-bin (KAIST Industrial Design department); Kim Bo-kyung (KAIST Industrial Design department)); Special Host: Lee Chang-sub (BtoB)
113	February 19, 2026	—N/a		Jeongwadate Season 1 Episode 7 (Note: With the following undergraduates: Jo Ho-jin (Seoul Institute of the Arts Acting Major); Im So-hyun (Chung-Ang University Psychology department); Shin Woo-cheol (Seoul Institute of the Arts Acting Major); Hwang Young-cheol (Seoul Institute of the Arts Acting Major); Min Kyung-seo (Seoul Institute of the Arts Acting Major); Kwon Ye-bin (Chung-Ang University Psychology department); Kim Ha-yeon (Chung-Ang University Psychology department); Lee Na-young (Chung-Ang University Psychology department)); Special Host: Lee Chang-sub (BtoB)
114	March 5, 2026	—N/a		Jeongwadate Season 1 Episode 8 - Second Chance (Note: With the following undergraduates: Kim Su-gyo (Korea National Sport University Physical Education department; previously appeared in episode 111); Lee Nam-yong (Seoul National University Aerospace Engineering department; previously appeared in episode 112); Yoo Joo-won (Hongik University Electrical Engineering Major; previously appeared in the special episode of Season 7 which was released on September 18, 2025); Yoon Eun-seo (Yonsei University Business Administration department; previously appeared in episode 106); Oh Yoo-na (Ewha Womans University Ceramic Arts department; previously appeared in episode 101); Kim Ha-yeon (Chung-Ang University Psychology department; previously appeared in episode 113)); Special Host: Lee Chang-sub (BtoB)

=== Season 8 ===
List of episodes in Season 8

Ep.	Upload Date	Featured University/School	Featured Department	Remarks
115	March 26, 2026	Inha Technical College	Secretarial Admin	
116	April 2, 2026	Yonsei University International Campus		Dormitory Visit
117	April 9, 2026	Sookmyung Women's University	School of Media	Special Guest: Kyehoon (KickFlip)
118	April 16, 2026	Korea Hotel & Tourism Technical College	Hotel Casino Dealer	Special Guest: Hwasa (Mamamoo)
119	April 23, 2026	Soongsil University	French Language and Literature	Special Guests: Cortis (Martin, Seonghyeon)
120	April 30, 2026	Shinhan University	Optometry	Special Guest: Dohoon (TWS)
121	May 7, 2026	Dong-ah Institute of Media and Arts	Composing	Special Guest: Asa (Babymonster)
122	May 21, 2026	Sungkyunkwan University	Semiconductor Systems Engineering	Special Guest: Taeyong (NCT)
123	May 28, 2026	Chungkang College of Cultural Industries	Web Novel	Special Guest: Chanyeol (Exo)
124	June 4, 2026	Yeonsung University	Dental Technology	Special Guest: Kim Yoo-yeon (TripleS)
125	June 11, 2026	Induk University	Jewelry Design	Special Guests: Riize (Eunseok, Sungchan)
126	June 18, 2026	Seoil University	Elevator	Special Guest: Sooin (Meovv)
127	June 25, 2026	Yonam College	Animal Science	
—N/a	July 2, 2026	—N/a		Jeongwadate Season 1 Highlights Part 1
—N/a	July 9, 2026	—N/a		Jeongwadate Season 1 Highlights Part 2
—N/a	July 16, 2026	—N/a		Jeongwadate Season 1 Highlights Part 3
—N/a	July 23, 2026	—N/a		Jeongwadate Season 2 Episode 1 - Solo Since Birth (Note: With the following undergraduates: No Tae-seung (Yonsei University Pharmacy department); Kim Ji-yeon (Sookmyung Women's University Social Psychology department); Jo In-seo (Sungshin Women's University Law department); Go Min-seok (Kyung Hee University Theater & Film department); Lee Han-byeol (Kunsan National University Food Engineering department); Kim Tae-hwa (Kyungpook National University Plant Life Sciences department)); Special Host: Lee Chang-sub (BtoB)
—N/a	July 30, 2026	—N/a		Jeongwadate Season 2 Episode 2 - Semiconductor Engineering & Medical School (Note: With the following undergraduates: Baek Seung-bin (Chungbuk National University Pre-medical department); Gu Min-seo (Korea University Semiconductor Engineering department); Lee Hee-geon (Chung-Ang University Pre-medical department); Yang Su-bin (Sogang University Semiconductor Engineering department); Han Gwan-hee (Gachon University Pre-medical department); Jeong Eun-soo (Hanyang University Semiconductor Engineering department)); Special Host: Lee Chang-sub (BtoB)
—N/a	August 6, 2026	—N/a		Jeongwadate Season 2 Episode 3 - Gwating's Inferno (Physical Education & Dance) (Note: With the following undergraduates: Lee Jun-hui (Kyung Hee University Global Campus Sports Coaching department); Kim Min (Yonsei University Physical Education department); Ham Yun-su (Korea National Sport University Physical Education department, majoring in Wrestling); Park Ji-min (Jeonghwa Arts College Applied Dance department); Choi Jeong-yun (Chung-Ang University Korean Dance department); Kim Ha-eun (Sejong University Dance department)); Special Hosts: Lee Chang-sub (BtoB), Belle (Kiss of Life); Kai is absent due to clash of schedules
—N/a	August 13, 2026	—N/a		Jeongwadate Season 2 Episode 4 - Hanyang University CC Gwating (Note: With the following Hanyang University undergraduates: Yang Ji-won (Mechanical Engineering department); Kim Seung-chul (Finance Management department); Yang Sang-heon (Semiconductor Engineering department graduate school); Yoo Min-ji (English Education department); Son Hee-jeong (Interior Architecture Design department); Lee Soo-jeong (Korean Music department)); Special Host: Lee Chang-sub (BtoB)
—N/a	August 20, 2026	—N/a		Jeongwadate Season 2 Episodes 5 & 6 - MT Gwating (Note: With the following undergraduates: Heo In-sung (Kookmin University Sports Education department); Jeong Hwan (Hankuk University of Foreign Studies Integrated Japanese Studies department); Han Gwan-hee (Gachon University Pre-medical department; previously appeared in episode 129); Woo Shin-young (Kyonggi University Japanese Language and Literature department; previously appeared in episode 104); Lee Seo-young (Ewha Womans University Korean Language Education department); Kim Ha-yeon (Chung-Ang University Psychology department; previously appeared in episodes 113-114); Choi Young-heon (Wonkwang University Physical Education department); Kim Yun-a (Yonsei University Quantitative Risk Management major)); Special Host: Lee Chang-sub (BtoB)
—N/a	August 27, 2026	—N/a		Jeongwadate Season 2 Episodes 5 & 6 - MT Gwating; Special Host: Lee Chang-sub (BtoB)

=== Season 9 ===
List of episodes in Season 9

Ep.	Upload Date	Featured University/School	Featured Department	Remarks
128	September 3, 2026	—N/a		College Extracurricular Activity Special with Google
129	September 17, 2026	Ewha Womans University College of Medicine	Medicine	
130	September 24, 2026	Jeonghwa Arts College	Hip-hop	Special Guest: Haon
131	October 1, 2026	Sungkyunkwan University	German Language and Literature	
132	October 8, 2026	Chonnam National University	Geography	Special Host: Song Ha-young (Fromis_9); Kai is absent due to clash of schedules
133	October 15, 2026	—N/a		Professors VS Students Special (Note: With the following undergraduates: Oh Min-geun (Sungkyunkwan University German Language and Literature department; previously appeared in episode 131); Yoon Eun-seo (Yonsei University Business Administration department; previously appeared in episodes 106 and 114); Yang Sang-heon (Hanyang University Semiconductor Engineering department graduate student; previously appeared in Jeongwadate Season 2 Episode 4)) (Note: With the following professors: Lee Dong-ki (Kookmin University Law department; previously appeared in episodes 41 and 47); Cho Yong-chul (Daegu Gyeongbuk Institute of Science and Technology Brain Sciences department; previously appeared in episode 108); Park Se-rim (Chungkang College of Cultural Industries Web Novel department; previously appeared in episode 123))
134	October 22, 2026	Hankuk University of Foreign Studies	Integrated Japanese Studies	Special Guest: Sakuya (NCT)
135	November 5, 2026	Seoul Institute of the Arts	Applied Music	Special Host: Lee Mu-jin; Kai is absent due to clash of schedules
136	November 12, 2026	Gachon University	Radiological Science	Special Guest: Jaemin (NCT)
137	November 19, 2026	Kookmin University	Automotive Engineering	Special Guest: Beomgyu (Tomorrow X Together)
138	November 26, 2026	Korea Institute of Energy Technology	TBA	

== Reception ==
=== Impact ===
In episode 22 of the series, Lee visited Yeonsung University. During the lunch break period, he discovered the university cafeteria served only 2 types of dishes, and he listened to the dissatisfaction from the students attending the university regarding the university cafeteria's menu. After the episode was aired, an online community post shared that the university cafeteria's menu had increased from 2 types of dishes to 40 types of dishes. An official from the university shared that Lee (and the series) had played a role in executing this change for the new semester.

=== Controversy ===
On October 5, 2023, after the release of episode 35 of the series, many have posted on Korea University's online community regarding the series' filming staff while filming of the said episode was done in the university. Those posts had stated the staff's abuse of authority such as restricting the university's undergraduates from entering the student center, and prohibiting talking among students in the venue while filming. Subsequently, many have requested, through the uploaded video's comments section, for an apology from the series' production team, but had been blocked. This controversy was spread out to various other online communities, with several students from other universities sharing their negative experiences with the filming staff while filming in those universities. The next day, the series' production team issued an apology as a pinned comment on ootb Studio's latest uploaded video, and later uploaded another apology as a community post on ootb Studio's YouTube channel. As a result of this controversy, a new episode was not uploaded on October 12 and would return the following week after reorganization.

=== Spin-off: Jeongwadate ===
During Season 7 of the series, episodes 101 and 106 were spin-off episodes which featured male and female students from different universities gathering to socialize and potentially find a romantic partner. These episodes had received positive and enthusiastic responses, hence on December 2, 2025, ootb Studio announced that this group date spin-off titled "Jeongwadate" (Korean: 전과팅) would officially become a regular show beginning January 2026, with new episodes releasing every alternate week during the school winter break in Season 7. The spin-off had returned for its second season beginning July 2026, during the 2026 school summer break in Season 8. The spin-off would be returning for its third season during the 2026 school winter break in Season 9.
