= Rover (Kai song) =

Single by Kai

from the EP Rover
- Language: Korean
- Released: March 13, 2023
- Studio: SM Starlight (Seoul)
- Genre: Dancehall; dance
- Length: 2:54
- Label: SM; Dreamus
- Composers: Dara; Cristian Tarcea; YNGA; Valentina Nikova; Young Chance; Gabriel Brandes
- Lyricist: Park Tae-won
- Producers: Cristian Tarcea; Imlay

Kai singles chronology
"Peaches" (2021)	"Rover" (2023)	"Adult Swim" (2025)

Music video
- "Rover" on YouTube

"Rover" is a song recorded by South Korean singer Kai for his third extended play of the same name. It was released as the EP's lead single by SM Entertainment on March 13, 2023.

== Background and release ==
In February 2023, SM confirmed that Kai would release a new solo album. On February 17, SM announced that his new EP, Rover, would be released on March 13. The song was released alongside the extended play and its music video on March 13.

== Composition ==
Once composed by Bulgarian singer Dara, who sold the original song titled "Mr. Rover" to KAI, "Rover" was composed by Cristian Tarcea, Dara, Valentina Nikova, YNGA, Gabriel Brandes and Young Chance, with the arrangement held by Tarcea and Imlay.

Described as a dancehall song with heavy bass, marimba, bells and various percussion instruments. The lyrics, which were written by Park Tae-won, discuss freeing onself from the restraints of others' viewpoints and living freely as a "wanderer". The song was composed in the key of C♯ minor, with a tempo of 186 beats per minute.

== Music video and promotion ==
The music video was directed by Kim Ki-hyun and Lee Hye-su of Swisher was released alongside the song by SM Entertainment on March 13. It was inspired by the films Billy Elliot (2000) and Catch Me If You Can (2002).

One hour before the release, Kai held a live broadcast through Exo's YouTube and TikTok channels in which he talked about his EP, songs and production process. He promoted the song with televised live performances on various South Korean music programs, including M Countdown, Music Bank, Show! Music Core and Inkigayo.

== Commercial performance ==
The song debuted at number 23 on Circle Digital Chart issue dated March 12 to 18, 2023. It also debuted at number one and 76 on the component Download Chart and BGM Chart, respectively.

== Critical reception ==
On NME's midyear list of the best K-pop songs of 2023, Sara Delgado wrote that the song "exceed expectations" and called it "an immediately enthralling earworm that still resonates through social media months after its release".

Year-end lists for "Rover"
Critic/Publication	List	Rank	Ref.
Dazed	Top 50 best K-pop tracks of 2023	47	
NME	The 25 best K-pop songs of 2023	10	

== Accolades ==
Awards and nominations for "Rover"
Award ceremony	Year	Category	Result	Ref.
MAMA Awards	2023	Best Dance Performance – Male Solo	Nominated	

Music program awards
Program	Date	Ref.
Music Bank	March 24, 2023	
Show! Music Core	March 25, 2023	

== Credits ==
Credits adapted from EP's liner notes.

=== Studio ===
- SM Starlight Studio – recording, engineered for mix, digital editing
- SM Blue Ocean Studio – mixing
- 821 Sound Mastering – mastering

=== Personnel ===
- SM Entertainment – executive producer
- Lee Sung-soo – production director, executive supervisor
- Tak Young-jun – executive supervisor
- Yoo Young-jin – music and sound supervisor
- Kai – vocals
- Park Tae-won – lyrics
- Cristian Tarcea – producer, composition, arrangement
- Imlay – producer, arrangement
- Dara – composition
- Valentina Nikova – composition
- YNGA – composition
- Young Chance – composition, vocal directing, background vocals
- Gabriel Brandes – composition
- Jeong Yu-ra – recording, engineered for mix, digital editing
- Kim Cheol-sun – mixing
- Kwon Nam-woo – mastering

== Charts ==
=== Weekly charts ===
Weekly chart performance for "Rover"
Chart (2023)	Peak position
Singapore Regional (RIAS)	13
South Korea (Circle)	23
US World Digital Song Sales (Billboard)	12

=== Monthly charts ===
Monthly chart performance for "Rover"
Chart (2023)	Position
South Korea (Circle)	124

== Release history ==
Release history for Rover
Region	Date	Format	Label
Various	March 13, 2023	Digital download; streaming	SM; Dreamus
