= Kai (EP) =

- Digital and Flipbook version cover

EP by Kai
- Released: November 30, 2020
- Recorded: 2020
- Studios: Big Shot; Blue Cup; Blue Ocean; Concert Hall; LVYIN; Yellow Tail
- Genre: R&B
- Length: 17:55
- Language: Korean
- Labels: SM; Dreamus
- Producer: Lee Soo-man

Kai chronology
Kai (2020)	Peaches (2021)

Singles from Kai
- 1. "Mmmh" Released: November 30, 2020

Music video
- "Mmmh" on YouTube

Professional ratings
Review scores
Source	Rating
Beats Per Minute	77%

Kai (Chinese: 开, lit. "Open", stylized as K开I) is the debut extended play by South Korean singer Kai. It was released on November 30, 2020 by SM Entertainment. The album features six tracks including the lead single, "Mmmh". The physical album is available in seven different versions (3 Photobook versions, 3 Jewel case versions and 1 Flipbook version).

== Background ==
On July 3, SM Entertainment announced that Kai would release his first solo album, and was working on the album production with the goal of the second half of 2020.

On November 11, it was announced that Kai will make his solo debut on November 30, with his 1st mini-album Kai.

Kai's debut single title "음 (Mmmh)", was announced on November 19.

== Composition ==
The title song "음 (Mmmh)" is an R&B pop song with a simple yet addictive melody on a minimalist track, it is also described to be a charming, straight-forward love song.

"Nothing on Me" is a PBR&B song featuring a heavy bass groove. It portrayed the moment when the protagonist getting intoxicated by the scent of the other person while moving closer them.

"기억상실 (Amnesia)" is an R&B and trap song with attractive grooves and melody. It discusses the moment when the protagonist is falling in love and forgetting all memories from the past, only want to fill in the memories with the current partner.

"Reason" is a progressive R&B song composed by American producer Mike Daley, with an addictive 808 pattern added to minimal club music, and the lyrics are intriguing about searching for one another, and eventually become fascinated to each other.

"Ride or Die" is a PBR&B song created by producer Cha Cha Malone, it incorporates oriental guitar sound and a dreamy atmosphere. The lyrics are about stepping out of the boundaries to enjoy life.

"Hello Stranger" is a progressive R&B song that stands out with a lyrical guitar sound, the lyrics depict a situation which a person feels a sense of sympathy to a stranger.

== Release and promotion ==
A video highlight "Film: Kai" was released on November 27, a video consists of the performance videos from all of the 6 tracks. The video was released on V Live, Naver, and YouTube. The video is said to raise anticipation for fans, and the inspiration for the concept come from various movies.

Kai appeared on DoReMi Market along with VIXX's Ravi, where he played along with the other cast members and gave spoiler to Mmmh's point dance in the show.

On November 30, the official music video for "Mmmh" was released at 12pm KST, 6 hours before the album's release. The music video incorporates various sci-fi like materials, and shows Kai's teleportation skill, which is his assigned superpower in Exo. An hour after the music video release, Kai appeared on Kim Shinyoung Noon Song of Hope Radio to promote the album and talked about various things related to the album. Exactly an hour before the album's release, Kai hosted a V Live broadcast where he promoted and discussed about the album with fans through interactive comments. Kai performed "Mmmh" for the first time on Naver Now Party B.

== Track listing ==
Kai track listing
No.	Title	Lyrics	Music	Arrangement	Length
1.	"Mmmh" (음; Eum)	Jane; JUNNY	Keelah Jacobsen; Cameron Jai; JUNNY; Jane	Keelah Jacobsen; Alawn	3:12
2.	"Nothing on Me"	Hwang Yoo-bin	Jake Torrey; Michael Matosic; Luke Niccoli	Luke Niccoli	2:40
3.	"Amnesia" (기억상실; Gieoksangsil)	Lee Seu-ran	Joe Thibodeau; Bryant Thompson; Rian Ball	Joe Thibodeau	2:58
4.	"Reason"	Jo Yoon-kyung	Mike Daley; Mitchell Owens; Michael Jiminez	Mike Daley; Mitchell Owens	2:53
5.	"Ride or Die"	Kim Yeon-seo	Cha Cha Malone; Singing Beetle; Adrian Mckinnon	Cha Cha Malone	3:20
6.	"Hello Stranger"	Hwang Yoo-bin	Rob Grimaldi; Theron Thomas; Ivory Scott	Rob Grimaldi	2:48
Total length:					17:51

== Charts ==
Chart performance for Kai
Chart (2020)	Peak position
Japanese Albums (Oricon Digital)	11
South Korean Albums (Gaon)	3
UK Digital Albums (OCC)	23
US Top Heatseekers (Billboard)	7
US World Albums (Billboard)	11
Chart (2023)	Peak position
Polish Albums (ZPAV)	84

== Certifications ==
Certifications and sales for Kai
Region	Certification	Certified units/sales
South Korea (KMCA)	Platinum	250,000^{^}
^{^} Shipments figures based on certification alone.

== Release history ==
Release history for Kai
Region	Date	Format	Label
South Korea	November 30, 2020	CD	SM; Dreamus
Various	November 30, 2020	Digital download; streaming	SM
