= Kai (entertainer, born 1994) =

South Korean singer (born 1994)

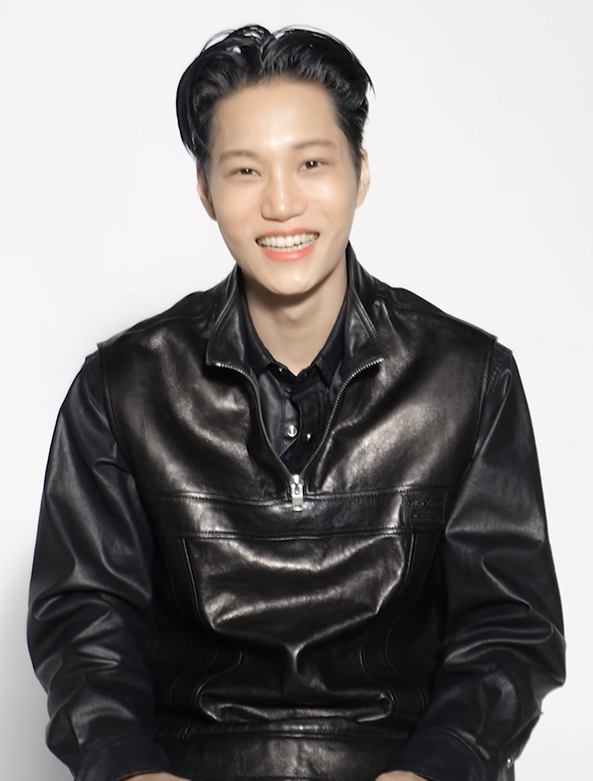
- Kai in 2023
- Born: Kim Jong-in; January 14, 1994 (age 32); Suncheon, South Korea
- Education: School of Performing Arts Seoul
- Occupations: Singer; actor
- Years active: 2011–present
- Musical career
- Genres: K-pop; R&B
- Instrument: Vocals
- Label: SM
- Member of: Exo; Exo-K; SM Town; Younique Unit; SuperM
- Website: Official website

Korean name
- Hangul: 김종인
- RR: Gim Jongin
- MR: Kim Chongin

Stage name
- Hangul: 카이
- RR: Kai
- MR: K'ai

Signature
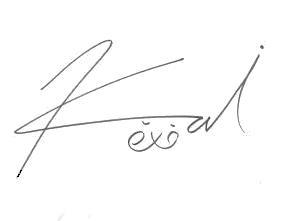

Kim Jong-in (Korean: 김종인; born January 14, 1994), known professionally as Kai (카이), is a South Korean singer and actor. He is a member of the South Korean boy band Exo and South Korean supergroup SuperM. He debuted as a soloist on November 30, 2020, with his first extended play (EP) Kai and has since released three more EPs, Peaches, Rover and Wait On Me. He is recognized for his dancing in South Korea and K-pop.

Apart from his musical career, Kai has also starred in various television dramas such as Andante (2017), Spring Has Come (2018) and The Miracle We Met (2018). He has also been a host and cast member for various television and web variety shows such as Changing Majors.

Kai is regarded by various publications as a fashion icon and has been a brand ambassador, muse and model for several brands, such as Gucci, Yves Saint Laurent Beauty, Lacoste, and others.

== Early life ==
Kai was born on January 14, 1994, in Suncheon, South Korea, as the youngest member of his family, with two older sisters. Despite his parents initially wanting him to learn Taekwondo and the piano, Kai began to train in ballet while in third grade after watching The Nutcracker, and started jazz dancing when he was eight years old in the fourth grade of elementary school. His father, now deceased, was the most important benefactor of his encounter with dance, which was of great significance to his life, according to a film about his growth story featured in Gucci's 2019 film series "The Performers". Kai attended high school at School of Performing Arts Seoul, from which he graduated in 2012.

== Career ==
=== 2011–15: Debut and career beginnings ===
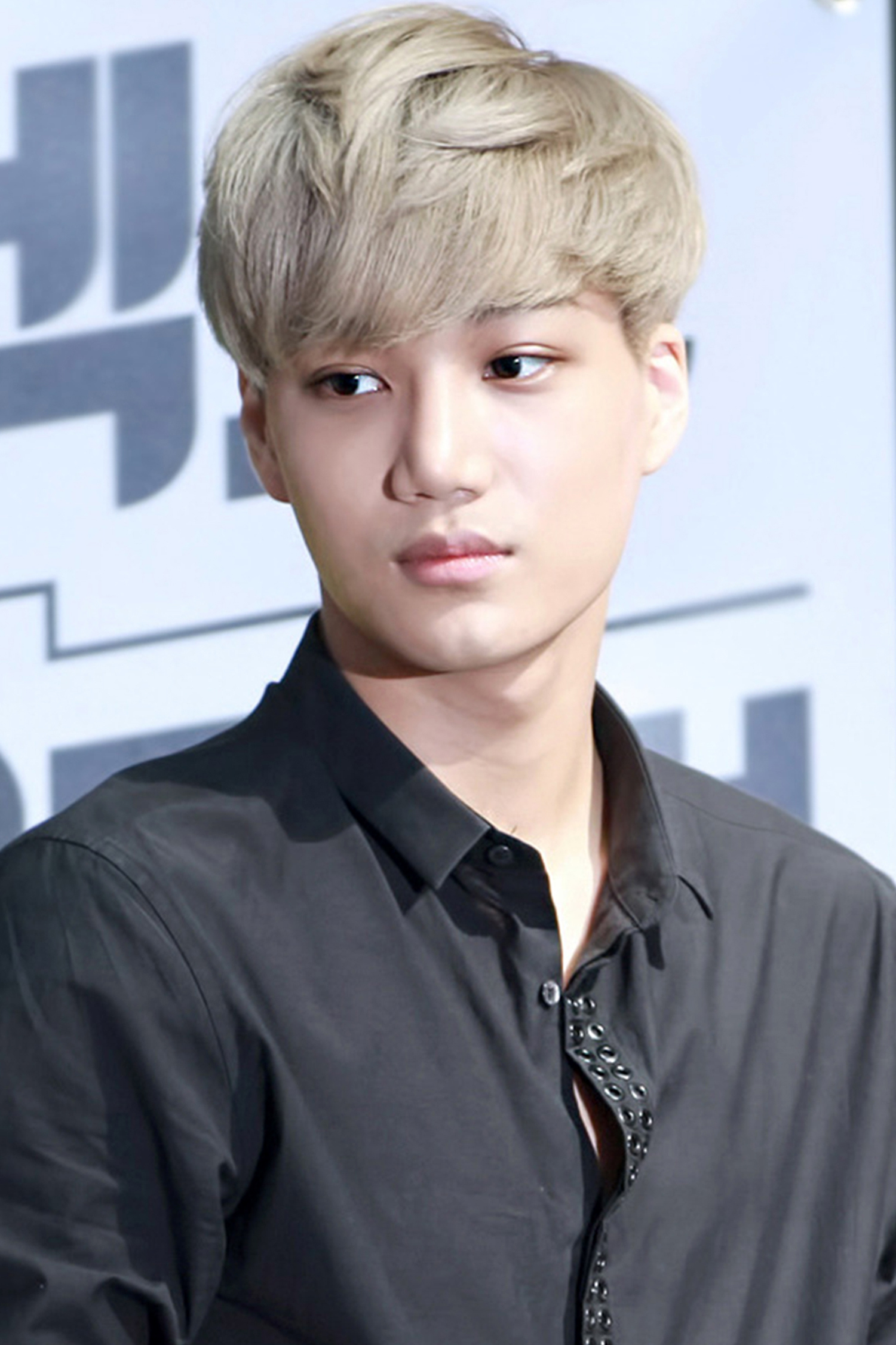
Kai at a fansigning event, August 2013

In 2007, encouraged by his father, Kai participated in and won SM Entertainment's Youth Best Contest and signed with the company at the age of thirteen years old. He then began training in hip-hop dance. On December 23, 2011, SM announced Kai as the first member of the company's upcoming boy group, Exo. He made his first televised performance alongside fellow Exo members Luhan, Chen and Tao as well as other SM artists at the year-end music program SBS Gayo Daejeon on December 29, 2011. The group officially debuted in April 2012 and has since gained significant popularity and commercial success.

In October 2012, Kai participated in the promotional group Younique Unit alongside labelmates Eunhyuk, Henry, Hyoyeon, Taemin and Luhan. The group released a single titled "Maxstep" as part of the collaboration between SM Entertainment and Hyundai. Later in December 2012, he joined the dance group SM The Performance, along with fellow member Lay, TVXQ's Yunho, Super Junior's Eunhyuk and Donghae, Shinee's Minho and Taemin. The group first made its appearance at the event SBS Gayo Daejeon on December 29, and performed their single "Spectrum". The single was officially released the next day. In August 2014, Kai was featured in the song "Pretty Boy" from Shinee member Taemin's debut album.

=== 2016–2019: Acting career and SuperM ===
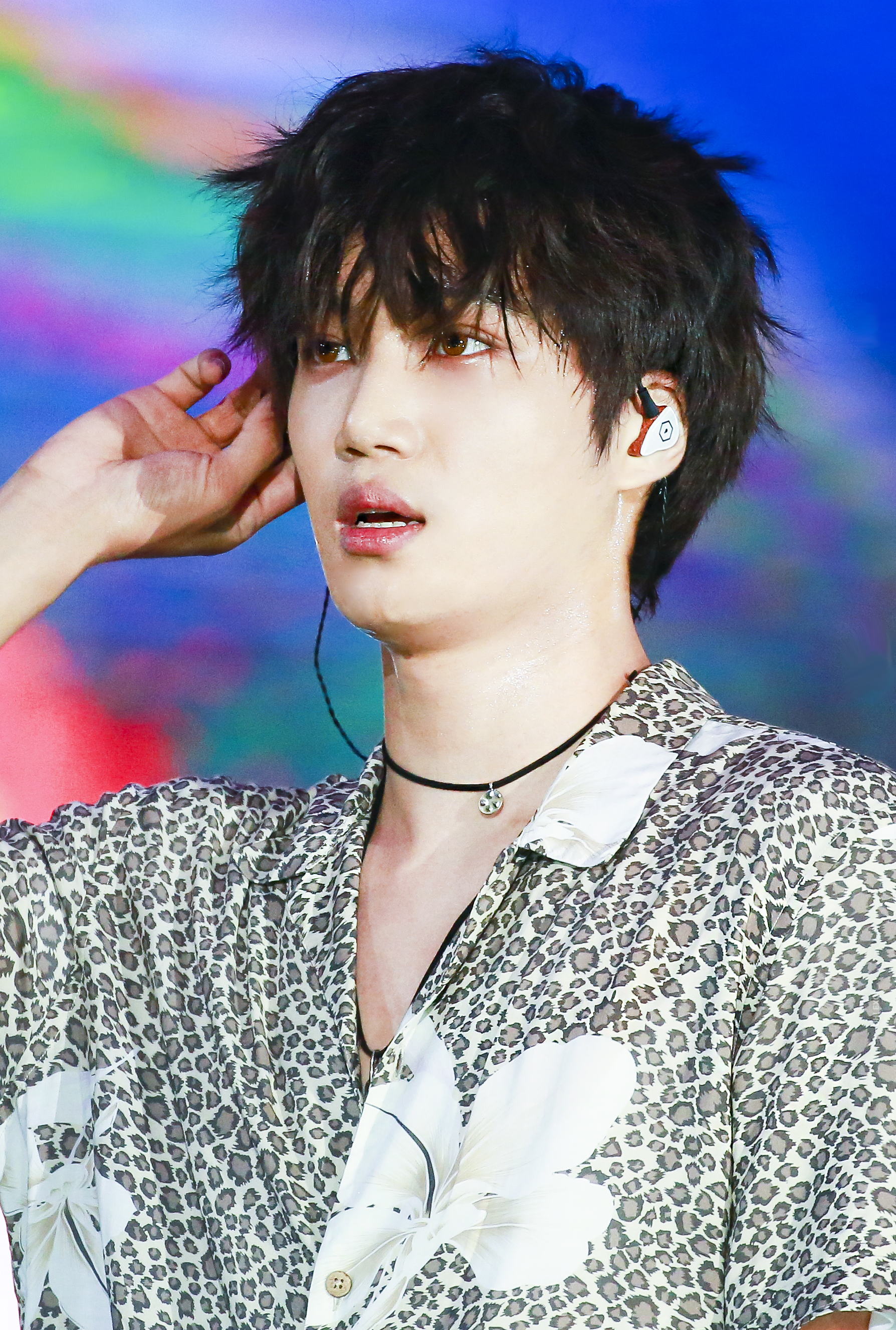
Kai at the Lotte Family Concert in Seoul, June 2018

In January 2016, Kai made his acting debut as the male lead in the web drama Choco Bank, which achieved record-breaking viewership. In December 2016, he starred in two episodes of the special web drama 7 First Kisses which was produced by Lotte Duty Free. In January 2017, Kai was announced to be starring as the male lead in the KBS teen drama Andante, playing a high school student. In February 2017, he was cast in the Japanese drama Spring Has Come, based on the Japanese novel of the same name. The drama marks the first time a non-Japanese actor taking a lead role on a drama produced by the broadcasting station Wowow.

On February 25, 2018, Kai performed a solo dance at the ending ceremonies of the PyeongChang Winter Olympics before joining the Exo members for a performance of "Growl" and "Power".

In February 2018, it was announced Kai was cast as Ato in the KBS melodrama The Miracle We Met. When asked why Kai was cast, the show's writer stated, "Since Ato himself is from the divine realm, we cast an actor with the image of a male god." For his performance, Kai was nominated for Best New Actor at the 32nd KBS Drama Awards.

On August 7, 2019, Kai was confirmed to be a member of SuperM, a "K-pop supergroup" created by SM Entertainment in collaboration with Capitol Records. The group's promotions are scheduled to begin in October and are aimed at the American market. SuperM debuted with the group's self-titled debut EP on October 4, 2019.

=== 2020–2022: Solo debut and variety activities ===
On July 3, 2020, SM Entertainment announced that Kai's first solo album was currently under production with the goal of being released in the second half of 2020. On November 30, 2020, Kai released his debut extended play Kai and its lead single "Mmmh". The album peaked at number 2 on the Gaon Album Chart and has been certified Platinum by the KMCA. On November 30, 2021, Kai released his second extended play Peaches and its lead single of the same name. The album peaked at number 3 on the Gaon Album Chart and has also been certified Platinum.

In 2021, Kai became an active entertainer in Korean variety shows, joining the cast of shows such as New World, Honeymoon Tavern, Idol Dictation Contest and The Devil Wears Jungnam. One of the producers of New World praised Kai's participation on the show, saying "[Kai] is really good at entertainment." At the 2022 Blue Dragon Series Awards, Kai won Best New Male Entertainer for New World.

On November 19, 2021, Kai opened his own personal YouTube channel to share vlogs and other video content.

=== 2022–2024: Solo activities and military enlistment ===
Throughout 2022, Kai performed at several K-pop festivals as a soloist, starting with Kpop Flex in Frankfurt on May 14 and 15. On June 24th, Kai performed at the Waterbomb Festival in Seoul. He headlined HallyuPopFest London on July 10 and HallyuPopFest Australia on August 14. He joined other SM Entertainment artists for the SMTOWN LIVE 2022: SMCU EXPRESS @TOKYO shows on August 27–29th.

In February 2022, a new original variety show Kai's Bucket List was announced with five episodes being released. In the show, Kai goes on a trip to Gangwon-do with friends and enjoys various extreme sports, camping, water activities, and spending time healing. In December 2022, Kai participated in the release of the song "Hot & Cold" alongside other SM Entertainment artists Red Velvet's Seulgi, Aespa's Karina and NCT Jeno for the 2022 Winter SMTOWN: SMCU PALACE album.

In January 2023, Kai conducted the solo concert tour KAI Japan Special Live 2023 in three cities in Japan. In February 2023, SM Entertainment confirmed that Kai plans to release a new solo album Rover on March 13. On March 13, Kai released his third extended play Rover and its lead single of the same name. For Rover, Kai won his first music show award as a solo artist on Music Bank, followed by a second award on Show! Music Core.

On May 4, 2023, SM Entertainment announced that Kai would have a fan meeting titled, "Kai's aKAIve", at YES24 Live Hall on May 9 at 19:00 (KST) and also broadcast live on Exo's official YouTube channel, two days before he enlisted to the military.

On February 14, 2024, SM Entertainment subsidiary Studio Realive and AmazeVR released "LYNK-POP The VR Concert – Kai", a virtual reality concert filmed before Kai started his military enlistment. The VR concert was released exclusively in theaters at Megabox COEX in Seoul and ran for three weeks. On the opening day, the film boasted a high seating rate of 74.62%, and even recorded a repeat viewing rate of nearly 15% from the first day of release. It garnered a positive response online, recording over 300 blog reviews and near-perfect scores, including a 10-point rating from Megabox audiences, a 98% re-watch rate in an internal survey, and a 99.9% recommendation rate. The Instagram CEO Adam Mosseri watched the film while visiting Seoul.

=== 2025–present: Solo and group activities ===
On February 11, 2025, a day after Kai's discharged from the military, he hosted a special live broadcast on Exo's YouTube, TikTok, and Weverse accounts titled Kai: Happily Ever After.

On February 17, 2025, Kai was announced as the new host of the web variety show Changing Majors, a program where Kai visits different universities across South Korea and experiences various departments firsthand. The sixth season recorded 103.52 million cumulative views and Kai's voice impression scenes throughout the 88th episode became a trending meme.

On March 5, it was reported that Kai was set to release his fourth EP in April 2025, with music video scheduled to film next week. On April 3, Kai released the pre-release single "Adult Swim", which was promoted at M Countdown and the SBS Inkigayo UNICON concert at the Tokyo Dome. On April 21, 2025, Kai released his fourth extended play Wait On Me and its lead single of the same name, his first album after a two-year hiatus due to military enlistment. Starting in May 2025, Kai embarked on his first solo concert tour KAION, performing in 10 cities in Asia and six cities in North America. The tour concluded with three encore shows in Seoul from September 26–28th. On July 7, 2025 Kai performed at the Waterbomb Festival in Seoul for the second time.

On November 5, 2025, Kai was featured in the song "Waterfalls" from TVXQ member U-Know's first full-length album.

In January 2026, Kai was announced as one of the hosts for a new SBS talk show Uh, but Like, Seriously!. His casting was later praised by television critic Jung Seok-hee, "The best thing this program did was hiring Exo member Kai."

On January 19, 2026, Kai joined Exo for the release of their 8th full-length album Reverxe. He participated in Exo's concert tour Exo Planet 6 – Exhorizon, which began with three shows in Seoul from April 10–12, 2026.

== Artistry ==
=== Musical style ===
Kai's artistry has been dubbed "Kai style" for being unique to him specifically as well as "limitless" for his ability to embody various concepts. He's described his conscious decision to try diverse concepts for his solo albums, "Rover, Mmmh, and Peaches have absolutely nothing in common. I want to continue showing various sides of myself in the future." He has been praised for transforming in a powerful performer on stage despite being a shy and introverted person off-stage. Describing this contrast, Kai said:

“Kai is me in my dream state. When I'm sleeping, it's like my dream character comes alive, and that would be Kai. I’m more of a normal, down-to-earth person. That's just me, but Kai is this persona that's on stage… I do notice that when I'm dancing and pulling off all these different concepts, [I’m] like a totally different person outside of myself doing that.”

In his solo career, he has placed a strong emphasis on pairing his music with performances and high-quality visuals. Regarding the release of the promotional video FILM : KAI for his debut solo album, Kai said: "What I'm good at is performing, so I was thinking about how I could show it, and I ended up making a performance video." For his second album Peaches, he released a prologue film to highlight the b-side song "Vanilla". For his third album Rover, he released a second iteration of FILM : KAI. For his fourth album Wait On Me, he released music videos for three tracks on the album.

=== Dance style ===
Due to his background in ballet and jazz dance, Kai has brought a contemporary style to solo stages such as "Deep Breath", performed at the MAMA Awards in 2014. Regarding this performance, Kai said:

At this point, I can really do anything: hip-hop, ballet, or modern dance. Back in 2014, there was a time when I wanted to show that 'I can now dance to every sound.' I thought back then that I could sublimate anything into dance—people’s voices, the sound of water droplets falling, or cars passing by. Originally, I wanted to record a completely mundane narration, like 'I woke up this morning, had a meal, and walked down the street,' and dance to that. However, due to stage production constraints, it wasn't possible. So, I ended up performing a stage called 'Deep Breath,' where I choreographed a dance to an instrumental track layered with narration.

During the Exo concert tour EXO PLANET #4 – The EℓyXiOn, Kai performed the solo stage "I See You (ICU)", which also demonstrated a contemporary dance style and incorporated ballet movements.

== Public image and influence ==
Kai is a notable figure and influence in K-pop, both as a member of Exo and as a soloist. He has been named a "world class performer" for garnering attention worldwide for his performances and an "entertainment blue chip" for his sincere and mature entertainment sense. He has also been referred to as the "idol of idols" for being cited as a role model and influence for many K-pop idols, including NCT Wish Yushi, SF9 Yoo Taeyang, Kang Daniel, and Zerobaseone Han Yu-jin. He has been noted as a major K-pop soloist, with W Korea stating "Kai deserves to be called the standard of group and solo activities" for his successful career as both a soloist and group member.

Kai's dancing skills and on-stage expressions have been recognized by key figures. Choreographers Bada Lee and Choi Youngjoon named him among the best dancers in K-pop. Girls' Generation Hyoyeon said Kai impressed her since his trainee days at SM Entertainment. One of the animators of the film Kpop Demon Hunters mentioned referencing Kai's facial expressions to bring the character of Saja Boys Jinu to life.

Several of Kai's solo performances have gone viral. His solo performance during Exo's Love Shot stage at the 2018 SBS Gayo Daejeon was named legendary and the stage video has since accumulated over 30 million views. In 2018, his solo fancams for Exo's Love Shot and Tempo went viral with millions of views accumulated. In 2023, the choreography for the single Rover, known as the "Rover Challenge", went viral with several celebrities doing the challenge. The virality of the "Rover Challenge" was called a "significant moment in K-pop culture history" for taking the trend of K-pop artists doing dance challenges together "to another level" after the significant attention it received.

Kai has been noted as one of K-pop's biggest fashion influencers. In 2019, British magazine GQ ranked Kai 7th in their list of "The 50 best-dressed men of 2020", the only K-pop artist to appear on the list and named him the "world’s best-dressed K-pop star". Teo van den Broeke, Style And Grooming Director of British GQ, said, "Easily the most enigmatic and stylish of his fellow K-pop sensations, the young member of Exo has a way with colour and fabric that few of his contemporaries could ever hope to achieve. What’s more, in my opinion, he wears Gucci better than Harry Styles and Jared Leto together, and that’s saying something." Also in 2019, British Vogue named him among the most stylish men in the world.

In December 2021, Glamour selected Kai as one of the "10 biggest style icons of 2021", the only Korean to appear on the list. Lyst placed Kai 4th on their 2021 Power Dressers list. Rolling Stone included him in a list of "25 most stylish musicians of 2022". He's also been named the "master of crop-tops" for his frequent use of crop-tops in stage costumes. After his appearance at Prada's SS26 show at Milan Fashion Week in May 2025, he was named the week's 5th top influencer for generating an Earned Media Value (EMV) of $2.19 million.

== Fashion and endorsements ==
Kai has appeared in or covered every major fashion magazine in South Korea, such as Vogue Korea, Elle Korea, GQ Korea, W Korea, Esquire Korea, and others.

In March 2018, Kai starred in Levi Strauss Korea's 2018 spring campaign, "Live in Levi's". Also in March, he starred in a digital pictorial and video campaign with actress Lee Yeon-hee to advertise the Solati Moving Hotel, a joint project between Hyundai Motor Company and SM Entertainment. In May, he attended his first Gucci show in France wearing the men’s Fall 2018 collection, and Vogue named him the star of the show and British Vogue named him the best dressed. In September 2019, Kai was named the global brand ambassador for Gucci and starred in their 2019 Fall/Winter eyewear advertising campaign. In December, Gucci released a short film about Kai's life, as part of their "The Performers" series in collaboration with Vogue.

In March 2020, Kai starred in Gucci's 2020 Spring/Summer eyewear campaign with the Chinese actress Ni Ni. In 2021, Kai participated in a campaign to model Gucci's Aria collection. In 2022, Gucci unveiled a Chuseok collection through the campaign "Homecoming with Gucci", modelled by Kai. In October, Kai became the first male Muse for Bobbi Brown Cosmetics. On November 1, Kai appeared in the online showcase "Tucson Beyond Drive", a collaboration between Hyundai Motor Company and SM Entertainment, where he presented a music performance titled "Follow Your Hidden Light" that combines K-pop and AR technology. In September 2021, the city of Seoul announced that they selected Kai as the face of the brand and a global ambassador for Seoul Fashion week Spring 2022. In November, Instagram Korea launched its "#JustLikeItGram" campaign to encourage users to make reels, with Kai serving as one of the ambassadors.

In January 2022, Charmzone Mask selected Kai as their new model, "hoping that it will deliver a youthful and trendy image of Charmzone's premium mask products". In February, it was reported Charmzone had sold 17 million masks. Later that year, Kai was also selected to model for the global outdoor brand Black Yak alongside singer IU as well as a model for their BCC collection. In September, Kai together with Hwasa became brand ambassadors for the South Korean health and beauty brand, Olive Young. In February, Kai became the muse for Yves Saint Laurent Beauty. For his first digital pictorial for the brand, he advertised their Touche Éclat Glow-Pact cushion in Marie Claire Korea magazine. In May, he advertised their All Hours Foundation in Vogue Korea. He attended pop-up events for the brand in Seoul in 2022 and 2023. In September, he attended a launch event in Paris for the brand's Libre perfume, hosted by singer Dua Lipa. While in Paris, Vogue Korea accompanied him to shoot a digital pictorial and video to promote the Libre perfume. In May 2023, a digital pictorial was released in Elle Korea where Kai advertised the perfumes Libre Eau de Toilette and Mon Paris Eau de Toilette Lumière.

In May 2025, Kai modelled the Versace Eros Energy Eau de Parfum in Elle Korea. He also attended a pop-up for the launch of Versace Eros Energy at a department store on May 28. In June, he attended the Prada 2026 Spring/Summer menswear fashion show at Milan Fashion Week. In October, Lacoste chose Kai as the model for their 2025 F/W season and tennis collection, with a digital pictorial released in GQ Korea. He also attended the Lacoste Spring/Summer 2026 Collection on October 5, 2025 in Paris, France.

In February 2026, Lacoste selected Kai as their new brand ambassador, as well as for MAC Cosmetics. In April, LEGO Korea appointed Kai into their new cohort of ambassadors, the "LEGO Builders Club". In June, Kai collaborated with the Korea Tourism Organization as part of its new inbound tourism campaign "BIAS (Be In Artists' Scenes)", to promote famous landmarks and experiential products in South Korea. Also in June, Kai was announced as Korean skincare brand Mediheal's new muse.

=== Kai x Gucci capsule collection ===
In 2021, Gucci released the capsule collection Kai x Gucci, designed by then creative director Alessandro Michele. A portion of the collection's proceeds went to support the Green Umbrella Children's Foundation. It marked the first time Gucci has worked with a Korean celebrity on a collection.

The collection was pre-released in Korea at special pop-up stores and then various products from the collection were available at selected Gucci stores and the official Gucci Korea online store. Kai attended launch events at the special pop-up stores and covered Esquire Korea magazine and Monotube magazine to promote the collection. A digital pictorial and video campaign with Kai was also released, along with a installation of massive bear balloons throughout Seoul, created by pop artist Im Ji-bin. A social media campaign was also launched to encourage participants to use a Kai x Gucci filter, and once the goal of 10,000 videos was reached, Gucci donated 100 million KRW to ChildFund Korea. The collection quickly sold out and online searches for Gucci surged 264% following its release.

== Philanthropy ==
In 2017, Kai participated in a charity bazaar to support single-mother families by donating personal items for auction. In December 2017, Kai was chosen as the cover model for December's issue of The Big Issue, a magazine known for helping the homeless. The magazine sold out 20,000 copies within the first two days, and until now, 80,000 copies have been sold, which records the highest number of copies sold since the magazine's start in July 2010. Alongside other Korean male celebrities, Kai participated in an episode of the SBS educational program 그것이 알고 싶다 that aired December 9, 2017, which centered on the topic of sexual violence.

In 2020, the Korean Committee for UNICEF announced a campaign with Kai to encourage participants to donate relief supplies to children in need around the world in time for Christmas. Also in 2020, Kai donated 50 million KRW to the Hope Bridge National Disaster Relief Association to help prevent the spread of COVID-19 and support the victims. In 2023, Kai met a fan suffering from Acute Lymphoblastic Leukemia through the Make-A-Wish Foundation Korea. In 2025, Kai donated 50 million KRW to the nonprofit organization Community Chest of Korea to be used for emergency relief efforts, including housing and livelihood support for victims of wildfires in the Yeongnam region.

== Other activities ==
In March 2021, Kai was the audio guide for an art exhibition in Seoul honoring pop artist Andy Warhol, recording commentary content for approximately 20 works of art in the exhibition. In December 2021, he participated in recording voice commentary for the first multimedia Braille book in the archaeological field explaining the Paleolithic culture of Korea.

== Personal life ==
=== Military service ===
On May 3, 2023, SM Entertainment announced through Exo's official fan club that Kai would have to fulfill his military mandatory service as a social service worker on May 11. Kai fulfilled his military service working at a dementia center. He was officially discharged from service on February 10, 2025.

== Discography ==
=== Extended plays ===
List of extended plays, showing selected details, selected chart positions, sales figures, and certifications
| Title | Details | Peak chart positions | | | | Sales | Certifications |
| Title | Details | KOR | JPN | US Heat. | US World | Sales | Certifications |
|---|---|---|---|---|---|---|---|
| Kai | Released: November 30, 2020; Label: SM Entertainment; Formats: CD, digital download, streaming | 3 | — | 7 | 11 | KOR: 359,563 | KMCA: Platinum |
| Peaches | Released: November 30, 2021; Label: SM Entertainment; Formats: CD, digital download, streaming | 2 | 14 | — | — | KOR: 265,201; JPN: 6,710 | KMCA: Platinum |
| Rover | Released: March 13, 2023; Label: SM Entertainment; Formats: CD, digital download, streaming | 1 | 12 | — | — | KOR: 246,576; JPN: 4,055 | |
| Wait on Me | Released: April 21, 2025; Label: SM Entertainment; Formats: CD, digital download, streaming | 2 | 21 | — | — | KOR: 256,940; JPN: 3,195 | |
"—" denotes a recording that did not chart or was not released in that territory

=== Singles ===
==== As lead artist ====
List of singles, showing year released, selected chart positions, and name of the album
| Title | Year | Peak chart positions | | Album |
| Title | Year | KOR | US World | Album |
|---|---|---|---|---|
| "Mmmh" (음) | 2020 | 26 | 15 | Kai |
| "Peaches" | 2021 | 73 | 13 | Peaches |
| "Rover" | 2023 | 23 | 12 | Rover |
| "Adult Swim" | 2025 | — (Note: "Adult Swim" did not enter the Circle Digital Chart, but peaked at number 31 and 186 on the Circle Download Chart and the Circle BGM Chart, respectively.) | 7 | Wait on Me |
| "Wait on Me" | 2025 | 98 | — | Wait on Me |
"—" denotes a recording that did not chart or was not released in that territory

==== As featured artist ====
List of singles as featured artist, showing year released, selected chart positions, sales figures, and name of the album
| Title | Year | Peak chart positions | | Sales (DL) | Album |
| Title | Year | KOR | US World | Sales (DL) | Album |
|---|---|---|---|---|---|
| "Pretty Boy" (Taemin featuring Kai) | 2014 | 33 | 15 | KOR: 53,588 | Ace |
| "Waterfalls" (U-Know featuring Kai) | 2025 | — | — | | I-Know |
"—" denotes a recording that did not chart or was not released in that territory

=== Other charted songs ===
List of other charted songs, showing year released, selected chart positions, and name of the album
| Title | Year | Peak chart positions | Sales (DL) | Album |
| Title | Year | KOR Down. | Sales (DL) | Album |
|---|---|---|---|---|
| "Maxstep" (as part of Younique Unit) | 2012 | — | | PYL Younique Volume 1 |
| "Deep Breath" | 2014 | 91 | KOR: 12,485 | Exology Chapter 1: The Lost Planet |
| "I See You" | 2019 | — | | Exo Planet #4 – The EℓyXiOn [dot] |
| "Nothing on Me" | 2020 | 37 | | Kai |
| "Amnesia" (기억상실) | 2020 | 39 | | Kai |
| "Reason" | 2020 | 36 | | Kai |
| "Ride or Die" | 2020 | 41 | | Kai |
| "Hello Stranger" | 2020 | 40 | | Kai |
| "Vanilla" | 2021 | 75 | | Peaches |
| "Domino" | 2021 | 77 | | Peaches |
| "Come In" | 2021 | 78 | | Peaches |
| "To Be Honest" | 2021 | 74 | | Peaches |
| "Blue" | 2021 | 73 | | Peaches |
| "Black Mirror" | 2023 | 88 | | Rover |
| "Slidin'" | 2023 | 91 | | Rover |
| "Bomba" | 2023 | 86 | | Rover |
| "Say You Love Me" | 2023 | 90 | | Rover |
| "Sinner" | 2023 | 96 | | Rover |
| "Walls Don't Talk" | 2025 | 58 | | Wait on Me |
| "Pressure" | 2025 | 67 | | Wait on Me |
| "Ridin'" | 2025 | 69 | | Wait on Me |
| "Off and Away" | 2025 | 70 | | Wait on Me |
| "Flight to Paris" | 2025 | 68 | | Wait on Me |
"—" denotes a recording that did not chart or was not released in that territory

=== Songwriting credits ===
All credits are adapted from the Korea Music Copyright Association, unless stated otherwise.

| Year | Artist(s) | Song | Album | Lyrics | |
| Year | Artist(s) | Song | Album | Credited | With |
|---|---|---|---|---|---|
| 2019 | Exo | "Confession" | Non-album single | Yes | Chanyeol, Danke, Dominique Logan, Darious Logan |

== Filmography ==
=== Television drama series ===
| Year | Title | Role | Notes | Ref. |
|---|---|---|---|---|
| 2012 | To the Beautiful You | Himself | Cameo (Episode 2) | |
| 2017 | Andante | Lee Shi-kyung | First lead role | |
| 2018 | Spring Has Come | Lee Ji-won | Japanese drama | |
| 2018 | The Miracle We Met | Ato | | |

=== Web drama series ===
| Year | Title | Role | Notes | Ref. |
|---|---|---|---|---|
| 2015 | Exo Next Door | Himself | Recurring; Fictional version of himself | |
| 2016 | Choco Bank | Kim Eun-haeng | Debut act | |
| 2016 | 7 First Kisses | Kai | Episodes 4–5 | |

=== Television variety shows ===
| Year | Title | Role | Notes | Ref. |
|---|---|---|---|---|
| 2018 | Under Nineteen | Special director | | |
| 2019 | Sooro's Rovers | Cast member | Episodes 1–16 | |
| 2021 | Honeymoon Tavern | Cast member | Episodes 1–9 | |
| 2021 | New World | Cast member | Episodes 1–8 | |
| 2021 | Sixth Sense | Guest | Season 2, Episode 3 | |
| 2021 | Knowing Bros | Guest | Episode 309 | |
| 2023 | Running Man | Guest | Episode 758 | |
| 2025 | Detectives' Trade Secrets | Guest | Episode 80 | |
| 2026 | Uh, but Like, Seriously! | Cast Member | | |

=== Web variety shows ===
| Year | Title | Role | Notes | Ref. |
|---|---|---|---|---|
| 2021 | The Devil Wears Jungnam 2 | Cast member | with Bae Jung-nam | |
| 2021 | Idol Dictation Contest | Cast member | Season 1 | |
| 2021 | The Godfather | Musician Assistant | with Tak Jae-hoon and Kim Jong-min | |
| 2022 | Kai's Bucket List | Himself | | |
| 2025 | Changing Majors | Host | Season 6, 7 | |

=== Music videos ===
| Year | Title | Director(s) | Ref. |
|---|---|---|---|
| 2012 | "Maxstep" (as part of Younique Unit) | Unknown | |
| 2020 | "Mmmh" | Jason Kim (FLIPEVIL) | |
| 2021 | "Peaches" | Jeon Soo-bin, Choi Ji-woo | |
| 2023 | "Rover" | Lee Hye-in (2eehyeinfilm) | |
| 2025 | "Adult Swim" | Park Min-soo | |
| 2025 | "Wait On Me" | Song Tae-jong | |
| 2025 | "Walls Don't Talk" | Unknown | |
Guest appearances
| 2014 | "In Summer" (remake; Deux) | Unknown | |

== Concerts ==
=== Headlining tour ===
| Title | Date | City | Country | Venue | Ref. |
|---|---|---|---|---|---|
| Kai Japan Special Live 2023 | January 28, 2023 | Nagoya | Japan | Nagoya Congress Center — Century Hall | |
| Kai Japan Special Live 2023 | January 29, 2023 | Osaka | Japan | Orix Theater | |
| Kai Japan Special Live 2023 | January 31, 2023 | Yokohama | Japan | Pacific Convention Plaza | |
| KaiOn | May 17, 2025 | Seoul | South Korea | SK Olympic Handball Gymnasium | |
| KaiOn | May 18, 2025 | Seoul | South Korea | SK Olympic Handball Gymnasium | |
| KaiOn | May 24, 2025 | Kuala Lumpur | Malaysia | Mega Star Arena | |
| KaiOn | June 7, 2025 | Macau | China | The Londoner Arena | |
| KaiOn | June 14, 2025 | Jakarta | Indonesia | Tennis Indoor Senayan | |
| KaiOn | June 21, 2025 | Singapore | | The Star Theatre | |
| KaiOn | July 12, 2025 | Taipei | Taiwan | Taipei Music Center | |
| KaiOn | July 27, 2025 | Quezon City (Note: Promoted as Manila.) | Philippines | Araneta Coliseum | |
| KaiOn | August 2, 2025 | Bangkok | Thailand | Thunder Dome | |
| KaiOn | August 6, 2025 | Yokohama | Japan | Pacifico Yokohama National Convention Hall | |
| KaiOn | August 7, 2025 | Yokohama | Japan | Pacifico Yokohama National Convention Hall | |
| KaiOn | August 16, 2025 | Hong Kong | China | AsiaWorld–Expo, Hall 10 | |
| KaiOn | August 28, 2025 | Los Angeles | United States | Shrine Auditorium | |
| KaiOn | August 31, 2025 | Grand Prairie | United States | Texas Trust CU Theatre | |
| KaiOn | September 2, 2025 | Atlanta | United States | Fox Theatre | |
| KaiOn | September 4, 2025 | Rosemont | United States | Rosemont Theatre | |
| KaiOn | September 6, 2025 | New York City | United States | The Theater at MSG | |
| KaiOn | September 9, 2025 | Mexico City | Mexico | Pepsi Center | |
| KaiOn | September 26, 2025 | Seoul | | Jangchung Arena | |
| KaiOn | September 27, 2025 | Seoul | | Jangchung Arena | |
| KaiOn | September 28, 2025 | Seoul | | Jangchung Arena | |

=== Online concerts ===
- Kai : KLoor (Beyond LIVE #Cinema) (2021)
- LYNK-Pop: The VR Concert – KAI (2023)

== Awards and nominations ==
Name of the award ceremony, year presented, category, nominee of the award, and the result of the nomination
| Award ceremony | Year | Category | Nominee / Work | Result | Ref. |
|---|---|---|---|---|---|
| Asian Pop Music Awards | 2021 | Best Male Artist (Overseas) | Kai | Won | |
| Asian Pop Music Awards | 2021 | People's Choice Award (Overseas) | Kai | Won | |
| Asian Pop Music Awards | 2021 | Best Dance Performance (Overseas) | "Mmmh" | Nominated | |
| Asian Pop Music Awards | 2025 | Best Male Artist | Wait On Me | Nominated | |
| Asian Pop Music Awards | 2025 | Best Dance Performance | "Wait on Me" | Nominated | |
| Blue Dragon Series Awards | 2022 | Best New Male Entertainer | New World | Won | |
| Brand of the Year | 2025 | Web Entertainment MC of the Year (Male) | Changing Majors | Won | |
| Golden Disc Awards | 2020 | Disc Bonsang | Kai | Nominated | |
| KBS Drama Awards | 2018 | Best New Actor | The Miracle We Met | Nominated | |
| KBS Drama Awards | 2018 | Best Couple Award | Kai (with Ra Mi-ran); The Miracle We Met | Nominated | |
| MAMA Awards | 2023 | Best Dance Performance – Male Solo | "Rover" | Nominated | |
| MAMA Awards | 2025 | Best Dance Performance Male Solo | "Wait on Me" | Nominated | |
| StarHub Night of Stars | 2018 | Favourite Korean Drama Character | Andante | Won | |
