= Peaches (Kai song) =

- Remixes cover

Single by Kai

from the EP Peaches
- Language: Korean
- Released: November 30, 2021
- Studio: SM Starlight (Seoul); SM LVYIN (Seoul)
- Genre: R&B; soul
- Length: 3:18
- Label: SM; Dreamus
- Composers: Wolfgvng; Zach Sorgen; Harold "Alawn" Philippon; Ryan S. Jhun; Yoo Young-jin
- Lyricist: Kim Anna (ARTiffect)
- Producers: Ryan S. Jhun; Wolfgvng

Kai singles chronology
"Mmmh" (2020)	"Peaches" (2021)	"Rover" (2023)

Music video
- "Peaches" on YouTube

"Peaches" is a song recorded by South Korean singer Kai for his second extended play of the same name. It was released as the EP's lead single by SM Entertainment on November 30, 2021.

== Background and release ==
On October 26, 2021, SM Entertainment announced that Kai will release his second solo album in November 2021. On November 11, it was announced that Kai would release his second extended play Peaches on November 30, 2021. The song was released alongside the extended play and its music video on November 30. The two remix versions by ScreaM Records of the song were released on February 24, 2022.

== Composition ==
"Peaches" was composed by Wolfgvng, Zach Sorgen, Harold "Alawn" Philippon, Ryan S. Jhun and Yoo Young-jin, with the arrangement was held by Wolfgvng, Jhun and Alawn. The song features some sweet vibes, raising expectations as you can also meet hip-hop-based songs that remind you of Kai's powerful performance. The song was composed in the key of F# major, with a tempo of 134 beats per minute.

== Music video and promotion ==
The music video, which was directed by Kim Ki-hyun, was released alongside the song by SM Entertainment on November 30. Blending traditional and modern elements from various cultures, the music video paints Kai "as a celestial immortal from folktales, wandering an Eden-like paradise and plucking peaches from the trees around him", with some "smooth and graceful" choreography scenes.

Before the official release, Kai held an online press conference with Sehun as his MC, where he talked about the song for the first time for the media. An hour before the release, he held a live broadcast through EXO's YouTube channel, where he talked about the album, songs and production process.

Kai promoted the song with televised live performances on various South Korean music programs including Music Bank, Show! Music Core and Inkigayo.

== Commercial performance ==
The song debuted at number 73 on the Gaon Digital Chart issue dated November 28 to December 4, 2021. And also debuted at number 1 and 47 on the components Download Chart and BGM Chart, respectively. Additionally, the song charted at number 13 on the US Billboard World Digital Song Sales chart.

== Track listing ==
- Digital download / streaming (iScreaM Vol. 14: Peaches Remixes)
1. "Peaches" (Sumin remix) – 3:19
2. "Peaches" (No2zcat remix) – 2:52

== Credits ==
Credits adapted from EP's liner notes.

=== Studio ===
- SM Starlight Studio – recording, engineered for mix, digital editing
- SM Lvyin Studio – recording
- SM Blue Cup Studio – mixing
- 821 Sound Mastering – mastering

=== Personnel ===
- SM Entertainment – executive producer
- Lee Soo-man – producer
- Lee Sung-soo – production director, executive supervisor
- Tak Young-jun – executive supervisor
- Kai – vocals, background vocals
- Kim Anna (ARTiffect) – lyrics
- Wolfgvng – producer, composition, arrangement
- Ryan S. Jhun – producer, composition, arrangement
- Zach Sorgen – composition
- Harold "Alawn" Philippon – composition, arrangement
- Yoo Young-jin – composition, music and sound supervisor
- Kim Yeon-seo – vocal directing
- Jeong Yu-ra – recording, engineered for mix, digital editing
- Lee Ji-hong – recording
- Jung Eui-seok – mixing
- Kwon Nam-woo – mastering

== Charts ==
Chart (2021)	Peak position
South Korea (Gaon)	73
US World Digital Songs (Billboard)	13

== Release history ==
Release dates and formats for Peaches
Region	Date	Format	Version	Label(s)
Various	November 30, 2021	Digital download; streaming	Original	SM
Various	February 24, 2022	Digital download; streaming	Remixes	SM; ScreaM

== Accolades ==
Publication	List	Ref.
Teen Vogue	Best K-Pop songs of 2021	
Paper Magazine	The 40 Best K-Pop Songs of 2021	
