= Mmmh (song) =

Single by Kai

from the EP Kai
- Language: Korean
- Released: November 30, 2020
- Recorded: 2020
- Studio: SM Yellow Tail (Seoul)
- Genre: R&B
- Length: 3:12
- Label: SM; Dreamus
- Composers: Keelah Jacobsen; Cameron Jai; JUNNY; Jane
- Lyricists: Jane; JUNNY

Kai singles chronology
"Mmmh" (2020)	"Peaches" (2021)

Music video
- "Mmmh" on YouTube

"Mmmh" is a song recorded by South Korean singer Kai. It was released on November 30, 2020, as the lead single of his debut extended play, Kai. The song was written and composed by Keelah Jacobsen, Cameron Jai, Junny and Jane. Musically, "Mmmh" was described as an R&B song with a simple yet addictive melody on a minimalist track.

== Background and release ==
On November 30, Kai made his official debut as a solo artist with the extended play Kai, which went onto debut at number three on South Korea's Gaon Album Chart. "Mmmh" was released on November 30 for digital download and streaming in various countries by SM Entertainment, as the lead single of Kai.

== Composition ==
"Mmmh" was described as a R&B pop song with a simple yet addictive melody on a minimalist track. In terms of musical notation, the song is composed in the key of G♯ minor, with a tempo of 137 beats per minute and is three minutes and twelve seconds long. It is also described to be a charming, straightforward love song. The lyrics confidently portray the attraction one feels to someone one has met for the first time.

== Music video and promotion ==
An accompanying dystopian sci-fi themed music video for "Mmmh" was uploaded to SM Entertainment's official YouTube channel, six hours ahead with the single's release. It was preceded by a teaser released on the same platform on November 26. The video features the singer's looking upon the city from the edge of a rooftop with striking looks featuring an ombré mullet and colorful garments as he dances to the sensual track. The visuals end with the singer standing on top of a building with a neon-lit city serving as the background.

Before the official release, Kai held an online press conference with Baekhyun as his MC, where he talked about the song for the first time for the media. An hour before the release, he held a live broadcast through Naver's V Live app, where he talked about the album, songs and production process.

Kai performed and promoted "Mmmh" for the first time on Naver Now Party B. And also with televised live performances on various South Korean music programs including Music Bank, Show! Music Core and Inkigayo.

== Commercial performance ==
The song debuted at number 26 on the Gaon Digital Chart issue dated November 29 to December 5, 2020. And also debuted at number 1, 15 and 178 on the components Download Chart, BGM Chart and Streaming Chart, respectively. Additionally, the song charted at number 15 on the US Billboard World Digital Song Sales chart.

== Credits ==
Credits adapted from EP's liner notes.

=== Studio ===
- SM Yellow Tail Studio – recording, engineered for mix, digital editing
- SM Blue Cup Studio – mixing
- 821 Sound Mastering – mastering

=== Personnel ===
- SM Entertainment – executive producer
- Lee Soo-man – producer
- Lee Sung-soo – production director, executive supervisor
- Tak Young-jun – executive supervisor
- Yoo Young-jin – music and sound supervisor
- Kai – vocals
- Jane – lyrics, composition
- JUNNY – lyrics, composition, background vocals
- Keelah Jacobsen – composition, arrangement
- Cameron Jai – composition, background vocals
- Harold "Alawn" Philippon – arrangement
- Deez – vocal directing
- Noh Min-ji – recording, engineered for mix, digital editing
- Jung Eui-seok – mixing
- Kwon Nam-woo – mastering

== Charts ==
=== Weekly ===
Chart (2020)	Peak position
South Korea (Gaon)	26
South Korea (K-pop Hot 100)	92
US World Digital Songs (Billboard)	15

=== Monthly ===
Chart (2020)	Peak position
South Korea (Gaon)	172

== Release history ==
Region	Date	Format	Label
Various	November 30, 2020	Digital download; streaming	SM; Dreamus
