= Kana Kurashina =

Japanese actress

- 倉科 カナ
- Born: December 23, 1987 (age 38); Minami-ku, Kumamoto, Kumamoto Prefecture, Japan
- Occupation: Actress
- Years active: 2006 - present
- Website: www.kurashina-kana.com

Kana Kurashina (倉科 カナ, Kurashina Kana; born December 23, 1987, in Minami-ku, Kumamoto, Kumamoto Prefecture, Japan) is a Japanese actress who is represented by the talent agency Sony Music Artists.

== Filmography ==
=== TV series ===
Year	Title	Role	Notes	Ref.
2009–10	Wel-kame	Nami Hamamoto	Lead role; Asadora	
2010	Mother	Kaho Suzuhara		
2011	The Reason I Can't Find My Love	Hikari Maeda		
2012	Hana no Zubora-Meshi	Hana Komazawa	Lead role	
2014	Smoking Gun	Emiri Nagatomo		
2014	Water Polo Yankees	Mafuyu Shōji		
2015	Seven Detectives	Tamaki Mizuta	7 seasons	
2017	Otoko no Misao	Junko Itsuki		
2018	Spring Has Come	Kishikawa Naoko	Lead role	
2019	Tokusatsu GaGaGa	Hisami Yoshida		
2019	Poison Daughter, Holy Mother	Asumi	Lead role; episode 5	
2021	Only Just Married	Miharu Momose		
2022–24	The Honest Realtor	Ryoko Hanazawa	2 seasons	
2023	Taiga Drama ga Umareta Hi	Midori Kusuda	TV movie	
2023	Ōoku: The Inner Chambers	Yanagisawa Yoshiyasu		
2023	Tonari no Otoko wa Yoku Taberu	Kana Kurashina		
2024	Oshi no Ko	Miyako Saitō		

=== Films ===
Year	Title	Role	Notes	Ref.
2012	Dreams for Sale	Ayame Saeki		
2013	Kids Return: The Reunion	Manami		
2017	March Comes in Like a Lion	Akari Kawamoto		
2017	March Goes out Like a Lamb	Akari Kawamoto		
2018	Under One Umbrella	Satsuki Takashima	Lead role	
2021	The Women	Kaori		
2021	The Seven Deadly Sins: Cursed by Light	Supreme Deity (voice)		
2024	The Crescent Moon with Cats	Kanoko	Lead role	
2024	Oshi no Ko: The Final Act	Miyako Saitō		
2026	The Honest Realtor: The Movie	Ryoko Hanazawa		
