= Rover (EP) =

- Digital cover

EP by Kai
- Released: March 13, 2023
- Studios: Doobdoob (Seoul); Embassy (Seoul); SM Big Shot (Seoul); SM Blue Cup (Seoul); SM Concert Hall (Seoul); SM SSAM (Seoul); SM Starlight (Seoul); Sound POOL (Seoul)
- Genres: R&B; hip-hop
- Length: 18:10
- Languages: Korean; English
- Labels: SM; Dreamus
- Producers: Cristian Tarcea; Imlay; John Eley; Jordan Dollar; Castle; Talay Riley; Sam Klempner; Vinny 'Vinnyforgood' Verdi; Michael "Trupopgod" Jiminez; Miguel Jiminez; Koen van de Wardt; Ruben Pol

Kai chronology
Peaches (2021)	Rover (2023)	Wait on Me (2025)

Singles from Rover
- 1. "Rover" Released: March 13, 2023

Rover is the third extended play by South Korean singer Kai, released on March 13, 2023, by SM Entertainment. The EP contains six tracks including the lead single of the same name. The physical album is available in five versions (two "Photobook" versions, one "Sleeve" version, one "Digipack" version, and one "SMini" version).

== Background and release ==
In February 2023, SM confirmed that Kai plans to release a new solo album. On February 17, SM announced that his new EP, Rover, would be released on March 13.

The music video for "Rover" was inspired by two movies: Billy Elliot (2000) and Catch Me If You Can (2002).

A promotional video entitled "FILM : KAI #Rover" for the EP was released on Exo official YouTube channel on March 20, featuring performances for each of the EP's b-sides.

== Composition ==
The lead single "Rover" is a dancehall song featuring heavy bass, marimba, bells and various percussions. The lyrics sing of throwing off the restraints of others' viewpoints and living freely as a 'wanderer'. "Black Mirror" is an R&B hip hop song with lyrics that question the lifestyle of modern humans reliant on the stimulating, provocative content on social media. "Bomba" is a dance genre song with reggaeton beats. "Slidin'" is an R&B soul genre song that features elegant arpeggio synth sounds and rhythmical drums. The lyrics compare falling in love at first sight with someone that you run into by chance to one's clothes becoming wet from a sudden downpour. "Say You Love Me" is a hip-hop R&B song accompanied by drums and 808 bass. The lyrics make use of candid, straightforward expressions to depict one's desire for the other to confirm their interest in an honest manner. "Sinner" is a pop genre song with piano and synthesizer as accompaniments. The lyrics express the desire to remain trapped in an exhausting type of love where both exhilaration and pain coexist.

== Commercial performance ==
The album debuted at #1 on the Circle Weekly Album Chart (March 12–18) while the lead single Rover topped the Circle Weekly Download Chart in the same week. The album topped the iTunes Top Albums chart in 40 regions, including Brazil, Mexico, Argentina, and Chile. Additionally, the lead single Rover debuted at #12 on the Billboard World Digital Song Sales.

== Reception ==
David Opie from Paste named Rover the 10th best K-pop album of 2023, who praised the record's production and sensuality. He named "Bomba" and "Sinner" as the EP's standouts.

== Track listing ==
Track listing for Rover
No.	Title	Lyrics	Music	Arrangement	Length
1.	"Rover"	Park Tae-won	Cristian Tarcea; Dara; Valentina Nikova; YNGA; Young Chance; Gabriel Brandes	Tarcea; Imlay	2:54
2.	"Black Mirror"	Mia (153/Joombas)	John "Jbl8ze" Eley; Jordan Dollar; Castle	Eley; Dollar; Castle	2:55
3.	"Slidin'"	Lee Yeon-ji (PNP)	Talay Riley; Steve "Tave" Octave	Riley	2:43
4.	"Bomba"	RGB (Lalala Studio); Kim Su-min (Artiffect)	Sam Klempner; Michael Matosic; Jake Torrey	Klempner	3:07
5.	"Say You Love Me"	Danke (Lalala Studio)	Vinny "Vinnyforgood" Verdi; Michael "Trupopgod" Jiminez; Miguel Jiminez; Dominique Logan; Darius Logan	Verdi; Trupopgod	3:06
6.	"Sinner"	Hwang Yu-bin (Verygoods)	Koen van de Wardt; Ruben Pol	Wardt; Pol	3:22
Total length:					18:10

== Credits ==
Credits adapted from EP's liner notes.

=== Studio ===
- SM Starlight Studio – recording (track 1), mixing (track 3), engineered for mix (track 1), digital editing (track 1, 3)
- SM Yellow Tail Studio – recording (track 3, 5), digital editing, engineered for mix (track 2)
- SM Big Shot Studio – recording (track 4), mixing (track 5), engineered for mix (track 4–5), digital editing (track 5)
- Doobdoob Studio – recording, digital editing (track 2, 4, 6)
- Sound Pool Studio – recording (track 3, 5–6)
- Embassy Studio – recording (track 2–3)
- SM Blue Ocean Studio – mixing (track 1)
- SM Blue Cup Studio – mixing (track 4)
- SM Lvyin Studio – mixing, engineered for mix (track 6)
- SM Ssam Studio – engineered for mix (track 3)
- SM Concert Hall Studio – mixing (track 2)
- 821 Sound Mastering – mastering (all tracks)

=== Personnel ===
- SM Entertainment – executive producer
- Lee Sung-soo – production director, executive supervisor
- Tak Young-jun – executive supervisor
- Yoo Young-jin – music and sound supervisor
- Kai – vocals (all tracks), background vocals (track 4–6)
- Park Tae-won – lyrics (track 1)
- Mia (153/Joombas) – lyrics (track 2)
- Lee Yeon-ji (PNP) – lyrics (track 3)
- RGB (Lalala Studio) – lyrics (track 4)
- Kim Su-min (Artiffect) – lyrics (track 4)
- Danke (Lalala Studio) – lyrics (track 5)
- Hwang Yu-bin (Verygoods) – lyrics (track 6)
- Cristian Tarcea – composition, arrangement (track 1)
- Dara – composition (track 1)
- Valentina Nikova – composition (track 1)
- YNGA – composition (track 1)
- Young Chance – composition (track 1), vocal directing (track 1, 4), background vocals (track 1, 4–5)
- Gabriel Brandes – composition (track 1)
- Imlay – arrangement (track 1)
- John "Jbl8ze" Eley – composition, arrangement (track 2)
- Jordan Dollar – composition, arrangement (track 2)
- Castle – composition, arrangement (track 2)
- Talay Riley – composition, arrangement (track 3)
- Steve "Tave" Octave – composition (track 3)
- Sam Klempner – composition, arrangement (track 4)
- Michael Matosic – composition (track 4)
- Jake Torrey – composition (track 4)
- Vinny "Vinnyforgood" Verdi – composition, arrangement (track 5)
- Michael "Trupopgod" Jiminez – composition, arrangement (track 5)
- Miguel Jiminez – composition (track 5)
- Dominique Logan – composition (track 5)
- Darius Logan – composition (track 5)
- Koen van de Wardt – composition, arrangement (track 6)
- Ruben Pol – composition, arrangement (track 6)
- Chancellor – vocal directing (track 2–3, 5), background vocals, recording (track 2–3)
- Rick Bridges – vocal directing (track 2)
- Kim Yeon-seo – vocal directing (track 5–6)
- Bob Matthews – keyboard (track 4)
- Jeong Yu-ra – recording (track 1), mixing (track 3), engineered for mix (track 1), digital editing (track 1, 3)
- Noh Min-ji – recording (track 3, 5), digital editing, engineered for mix (track 2)
- Lee Min-gyu – recording (track 4), mixing (track 5), engineered for mix (track 4–5), digital editing (track 5)
- Eugene Kwon – recording, digital editing (track 2, 4, 6)
- Jung Ho-jin – recording (track 3, 5–6)
- Kim Cheol-sun – mixing (track 1)
- Jung Eui-seok – mixing (track 4)
- Lee Ji-hong – mixing, engineered for mix (track 6)
- Kang Eun-ji – engineered for mix (track 3)
- Nam Koong-jin – mixing (track 2)
- Lee Yong-jin – digital editing (track 3)
- Woo Min-jeong – digital editing (track 4)
- Kwon Nam-woo – mastering (all tracks)

== Charts ==
=== Weekly charts ===
Weekly chart performance for Rover
Chart (2023)	Peak position
Japanese Albums (Oricon)	12
Japanese Combined Albums (Oricon)	19
Japanese Hot Albums (Billboard Japan)	8
South Korean Albums (Circle)	1

=== Monthly charts ===
Monthly chart performance for Rover
Chart (2023)	Peak position
South Korean Albums (Circle)	8

== Sales ==
Sales for Rover
Region	Sales
Japan	4,055
South Korea	247,222

== Release history ==
Release history for Rover
Region	Date	Format	Label
Various	March 13, 2023	Digital download; streaming	SM; Dreamus
South Korea	March 13, 2023	CD	SM; Dreamus
South Korea	March 17, 2023	SMC	SM; Dreamus
