= Peaches (EP) =

- Digital and Peaches version cover

EP by Kai
- Released: November 30, 2021
- Recorded: 2021
- Studios: Doobdoob (Seoul); SM Blue Ocean (Seoul); SM Concert Hall (Seoul); SM LVYIN (Seoul); SM SSAM (Seoul); SM Starlight (Seoul); SM Yellow Tail (Seoul)
- Genre: R&B
- Length: 18:38
- Language: Korean
- Labels: SM; Dreamus
- Producer: Lee Soo-man

Kai chronology
Kai (2020)	Peaches (2021)	Rover (2023)

Singles from Peaches
- 1. "Peaches" Released: November 30, 2021

Professional ratings
Review scores
Source	Rating
NME	4/5 stars

Peaches is the second extended play by South Korean singer Kai. It was released on November 30, 2021, by SM Entertainment. The EP contains six tracks including the lead single of the same name. The physical album is available in three versions (2 Photobook versions and one Digipack version).

== Background and release ==
On October 26, 2021, SM Entertainment announced that Kai will release his second solo album in November 2021.

On November 11, it was announced that Kai will release his second extended play Peaches on November 30, 2021.

== Composition ==
The title song "Peaches" features sweet vibes, raising expectations as you can also meet hip-hop-based songs that remind you of Kai's powerful performance. "Vanilla" is an indie-pop genre song that combines drowsy guitar, bongo, and tropical synthesizer sounds, comparing the feeling of falling in love with a soft vanilla taste, and the repeated chorus doubles the dreamy atmosphere of the song. The song "Domino" was described R&B hip-hop genre song with heavy bass, drums, and low-tone vocals which lyrically expresses that once it starts, let's move away from the gaze or worries of others and move as much as we want. "Come In" was described as a groovy hip-hop dance genre song that impresses the use of layered bases, synthesizers, and vocoders, with the lyrics that express the message of not hesitating in love and approaching boldly are eye-catching. "To Be Honest" is a song with a rhythmical main riff, drums, and 808 bass, with the lyrics about expressing each other's feelings honestly and not hiding their feelings anymore doubles their charm.

"Blue" is a R&B pop genre song that combines lo-fi guitar and emotional piano performance. "Blue" songwriter Brady Tutton said that during the production, Kai participated in the song's changes: "Kai and I, in a lot of ways, have a similar style, so I was really happy with how his version of the song sounded. We went back and forth for a few weeks trying different ad-libs, adding a bridge, and changing the flow of some melodies."

== Track listing ==
Peaches track listing
No.	Title	Lyrics	Music	Arrangement	Length
1.	"Peaches"	Kim Anna (ARTiffect)	Wolfgvng; Zach Sorgen; Ryan S. Jhun; Harold Philippon; Yoo Young-jin	Wolfgvng; Jhun; Alawn	3:18
2.	"Vanilla"	January 8th (Lalala Studio)	Max Vehuni	Vehuni	3:28
3.	"Domino"	Thama	Nathan Cunningham; Marc Sibley; Benjamin Shapiro	Space Primates	2:55
4.	"Come In"	Hyun Ji-won	Rick Parkhouse; George Tizzard; Shakka Philip	Red Triangle	3:02
5.	"To Be Honest"	Mola (Flying Lab)	Blaq Tuxedo; Dewain Whitmore Jr.	Blaq Tuxedo; Whitmore Jr.	2:53
6.	"Blue"	Jang Han-bit (Jam Factory)	Zachary Wiznitzer; Matthew T. Wiggers; Brady Tutton; Edith Hedwig Boguslawski; Stanley H Greene Jr.; Jhun	Wiznitzer; Wiggers; Tutton; Jhun	3:00
Total length:					18:38

== Charts ==
=== Weekly charts ===
Weekly chart performance of Peaches
Chart (2021)	Peak position
Japanese Albums (Oricon)	14
Japanese Hot Albums (Billboard Japan)	11
South Korean Albums (Gaon)	2
UK Album Downloads (Official Charts)	46

=== Year-end charts ===
Year-end chart performance for Peaches
Chart (2021)	Position
South Korean Albums (Gaon)	50

== Certifications ==
Certifications and sales for Peaches
Region	Certification	Certified units/sales
South Korea (KMCA)	Platinum	250,000^{^}
^{^} Shipments figures based on certification alone.

== Release history ==
Release dates and formats for Peaches
Region	Date	Format	Label(s)
South Korea	November 30, 2021	CD	SM; Dreamus
Variouse	November 30, 2021	Digital download; streaming	SM

== Accolades ==
Select year-end rankings of Peaches
Publication	List	Rank	Ref.
South China Morning Post	25 best K-pop albums of 2021	13	
Harper's Bazaar	Top K-Pop albums of 2021	11	
