= Honeymoon Tavern =

2021 South Korean television program

- Promotional poster
- Also known as: Udo Inn
- Genre: Variety show; Travel show; Reality show
- Written by: Lee Woo-hyung
- Directed by: Yang Seul-gi
- Starring: Kim Hee-sun; Tak Jae-hoon; Yoo Teo; Moon Se-yoon; Kai
- Country of origin: South Korea
- Original language: Korean
- No. of episodes: 9

Production
- Producer: Park Sang-hyuk
- Production location: South Korea
- Running time: 90 min

Original release
- Network: tvN
- Release: July 12, 2021

Honeymoon Tavern (Korean: 우도 주막; RR: Udo jumak) is a South Korean travel-reality show premiered on July 12, 2021, and aired every Monday at 10:30pm KST on tvN and TVING online platform. Meanwhile, tvN Asia premiered the show on July 22, 2021, at 10:30pm GMT+8, every Thursday onward.

== Overview ==
This show was created during the COVID-19 pandemic, where people can't easily travel around due to safety precautions. Even an ordinary wedding has become an old story and henceforth, a 'Newlyweds Only' tavern opens on Udo, Jeju Island, an island within an island!

A group of celebrity cast runs the tavern as a guest house for newlyweds only and serve the guests with homemade foods and drinks, while creating a memorable honeymoon for newlywed couples who got married during the pandemic with some surprise events. Look forward for the sweet and savory first night in Udo!

== Cast ==
Name	Role
Kim Hee-sun	Tavern's Master
Tak Jae-hoon	Manager
Yoo Teo	Main Chef
Moon Se-yoon	All Rounder
Kai	Maknae with Sense "Ace"

== Guest Employee ==
Employee	Episode
Ryu Deok-hwan	Episode 2 & 3
Lee Seok-hoon of SG Wannabe	Episode 5 & 6
Jung Yong-hwa of CNBlue	Episode 8

== Episode ==
Episode	Broadcast Date	Guest Employee	Note	Newlywed Guest Couples
1	July 12, 2021	—N/a	The cast started off their first staff meeting at Kai's house to discuss on the tavern's operations with the presence of only Kim Hee-sun, Kai, Tak Jae-hoon, Yoo Teo and the crew. Moon Se-yoon later on joined them by surprise when they had arrived and settled in Udo. They started to open the tavern on their second day after done setting up the tavern and familiarizing with Udo's hotspots as a whole on their first day there.	Lee Se-hoon & Kim Hyun-mi; Choi Byung-hoon & Kim Min-gyeong; Park Chang-sin & Yoo Jae-rim
2	July 19, 2021	Ryu Deok-hwan	Actor Ryu Deok-hwan joined the tavern's staff by surprise to take over Moon Se-yoon and Kai' duties while the latter pair are away from the tavern.	Kim Min-joon & Lee Seo-jeong; Kim Yong-hyun & Kim Hyun-hwa; Park Hyun-woo & Seo Min-jeong
3	July 26, 2021	Ryu Deok-hwan	The newlywed couples work in the same industry for both husband and wife.	Lee Sung-chang & Yang Ja-woon; Park Young-wan & Lee Ga-kyung; Song Yoo-joon & Choi Bo-ram
4	August 2, 2021	—N/a	This is the casts' second time returning to Udo after they went back to Seoul at the end of the previous episode's filming. The original tavern's staff becomes complete again as Kai and Moon Se-yoon rejoin the staff for this second filming. On this episode, the tavern's staff agreed to rearrange their duties for a more organized servicing. Simultaneously, a late night food cart is added on the courtyard as per suggested by Kim Hee-sun where the guests can socialize with each other while being served with some snacks and drinks.	Lee Jong-hoon & So Yoon-jeong; Kang Sang-hoon & Eun Ha-yeong; Kim Jong-Ho & Shin Ji-won
5	August 9, 2021	Lee Seok-hoon	Tak Jae-hoon, Moon Se-yoon and Kai went out to visit some Udo's hotspots early in the morning, meanwhile Kim Hee-sun and Yoo Teo stays at the tavern as standby staff to attend the guests. Concurrently, Lee Seok-hoon visited the tavern by surprise as an extra part-timer. During the day, Kim Hee-sun brought the brides to eat Udo's famous peanut ice-cream while enjoying the view on a "Brides' Tour". Meanwhile, the grooms stayed at the tavern and spontaneously discussed a surprise marriage proposal of Woo Dong-kook & Jang Se-hee couple who had not hold their wedding ceremony yet. During the proposal, Kai secretively followed the couple to launch fireworks and create an uplifting mood for the event.	Shin Joo-cheol & Lee Seung-yeon; Jo Geon-hee & Seo Hye-jin; Woo Dong-kook & Jang Se-hee
6	August 16, 2021	Lee Seok-hoon	After the previous guests had left, the staff were then separated into three; shopping team (Tak Jae-hoon & Kim Hee-sun), cooking preparation (Yoo Teo); and diving team (Moon Se-yoon & Kai). After Lee Seok-hoon left Honeymoon Tavern, the shopping team went out to Jeju hunting for props to create more fun & exciting activities for the upcoming guests while their stay at the tavern. Meanwhile, Yoo Teo who stayed at the tavern occupied himself with cooking preparations for dinner. At the same time, the diving team entered the sea with a help from a local haenyeo diver and managed to catch some sea urchins and brought them back with abalones to serve their new guests.	Kim Min-seong & Hwang In-yung; Jung Jae-in & Choo Ryeo-jin; Choi Yoo-il & Tiffany

== International Broadcast ==
OTT Viu is serving this show to its respective local viewers starting from July 13 onwards.

Concurrently, tvN Asia premiered this show on July 22 at 10:30pm for GMT +8 regions and 9:30pm for GMT +7 regions of the platforms that serves tvN Asia channel.

== Ratings ==
- In the tables below, the blue numbers represent the lowest ratings and the red numbers represent the highest ratings.
- These ratings are the collection for cable TVs which are separated from the national TV broadcasting's rating collection.

Ep.	Broadcast Date	Nielsen Korea Ratings		Overall Ranking	Entertainment Ranking	Notes
Ep.	Broadcast Date	Nationwide	Metropolitan	Overall Ranking	Entertainment Ranking	Notes
1	July 12	2.590%	3.084%	2nd	1st	Highest minute performance peaked at 4.3%
2	July 19	1.546%	1.573%	8th	1st	
3	July 26	1.735%	2.128%	7th	1st	
4	August 2	1.767%	1.855%	3rd	1st	
5	August 9	1.815%	1.949%	3rd	1st	
6	August 16	1.137%	—N/a	23rd	2nd	
7	August 23	1.157%	—N/a	29th	3rd	
8	August 30	1.969%	2.265%	1st	1st	
9	September 6	1.797%	1.785%	3rd	1st	
