= Spring Has Come =

- Based on: Spring Has Come by Kuniko Mukōda
- Screenplay by: Yoshida Yayoi
- Directed by: Kawai Hayato
- Starring: Kai; Kana Kurashina
- Ending theme: "Lovin' You Mo'" by EXO
- Country of origin: Japan
- Original language: Japanese
- No. of episodes: 5

Production
- Production locations: Japan; Jeju, South Korea

Original release
- Network: WOWOW
- Release: January 13 – February 10, 2018

Spring Has Come (Japanese: 春が来た, Hepburn: Harugakita) is a Japanese television series starring Kai and Kana Kurashina. The series is based on a novel with the same name and is written by Kuniko Mukōda. It aired on WOWOW every Saturday at 10:00 (JST) starting from January 13, 2018.

== Plot ==
This tale follows Kishikawa Naoko, a 31-year-old woman who works in an undergarment department store. By coincidence, she meets Lee Ji-won, a South Korean photographer who changes her life, and she begins to uncover her family's secrets bit by bit.

== Cast ==
=== Main ===
- Kai as Lee Ji-won

A Korean photographer who has been in Japan for 2 years. He meets Naoko at the shooting site and they become attracted to each other.

- Kana Kurashina as Kishikawa Naoko

A 31 years old salesperson at a women's underwear department and eldest daughter of the Kishikawa family. She lives with her parent and younger sister.

=== Supporting ===
==== People around Kishikawa Naoko ====
- Seika Furuhata as Kishikawa Junko (sister)

A high school student who works a part-time job and keeping it as a secret from her family. She wishes to get out of their old house and live alone.

- Atsuko Takahata as Kishikawa Sue (mother)

After her husband's retirement, she took a part-time job and from the exhaustion, she neglect doing the household chores.

- Shirō Sano as Kishikawa Shuji (father)

Three years ago, he retired from his company. Because of his pride, he doesn't seem to find a regular job for himself. He works a part-time job at a security company. He has secrets that he cannot tell to his family and is giving him a daily stress.

=== Others ===
- Kentaro
- Shoko Takada

== Production ==
The drama marks the first time a non-Japanese actor taking the lead role in a drama produced by the broadcasting station WOWOW.

Filming began in Japan in March then moved to Jeju, South Korea on April 15. Filming ended in May 2017.

== Original soundtrack ==
No.	Title	Lyrics	Music	Artists	Length
1.	"Lovin' You Mo'"	Amon Hayashi	KAY; Avenue 52; Darren "Baby Dee Beats" Smith	EXO	3:44
Total length:					3:44

== List of episodes ==
The first episode was aired four times for free for the watchers.

Episode #	Date
1	January 13, 2018
2	January 20, 2018
3	January 27, 2018
4	February 3, 2018
5	February 10, 2018
