= Induk University =

University in Seoul, South Korea

Coordinates: 37.63139°N 127.05474°E

- 인덕대학교
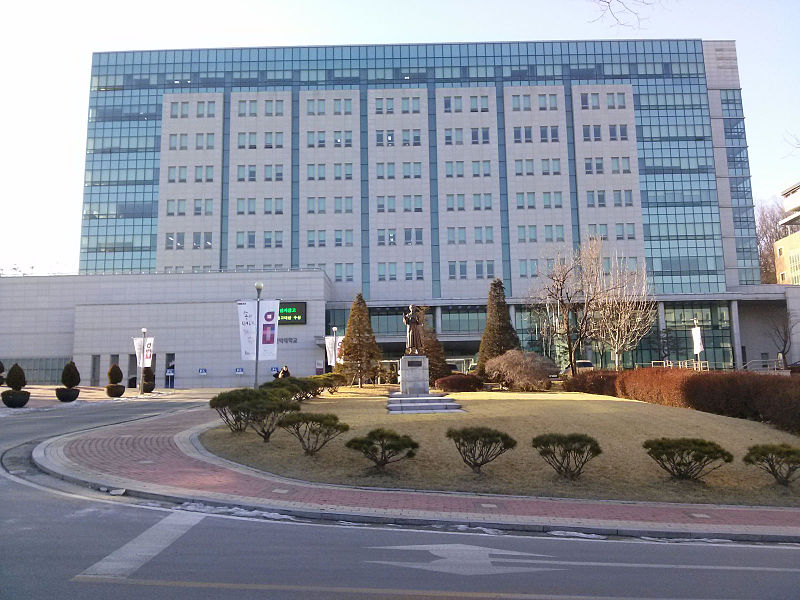
- Type: Private
- Established: 1971
- Location: Seoul, South Korea
- Website: induk.ac.kr

Korean name
- Hangul: 인덕대학교
- Hanja: 仁德大學校
- RR: Indeok daehakgyo
- MR: Indŏk taehakkyo

Induk University (Korean: 인덕대학교) is a university in Seoul, South Korea. It was established by Asian American writer Induk Pahk as "Berea in Korea" in 1963, became the "Induk Institute of Design" in 1971, and was renamed "Induk University" in 2009. It is located in Nowon-gu, along with a number of other educational institutes. The university provides a range of two- and three-year courses.

Soo Jung Kim—creator of Dooly the Little Dinosaur and former president of the Korea Animation Producers Association—teaches at the university's Department of Animation. Actor Shin Hyun-joon is an acting professor in the Department of Broadcasting and Entertainment.

The university has a number of student clubs and business start-up clubs. After the 2010 Chile earthquake students from the Department of Tourism and Leisure Management raised 800,000 won to help rebuild a school in Chile.
