= Hansung University =

Private university in Seoul, South Korea

Coordinates: 37°58′23.63″N 127°01′04.18″E

- 한성대학교 (漢城大學校)
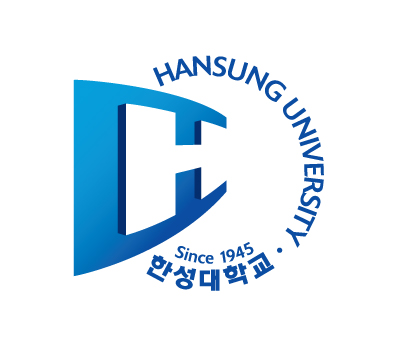
- Former names: Hansung Woman's University (1972–1978); Hansung College (1978–1993)
- Motto: 진리, 지선
- Motto in English: Truth and Virture
- Type: Private
- Established: December 21, 1972; 53 years ago
- President: Lee Chang Won
- Location: Seongbuk District, Seoul, South Korea
- Campus: Urban
- Mascot: Turtle
- Website: Official website

- Hansung University
- Hangul: 한성대학교
- Hanja: 漢城大學校
- RR: Hanseong daehakgyo
- MR: Hansŏng taehakkyo

Hansung University (Korean: 한성대학교) is a private university in Seongbuk District, Seoul, South Korea. It was founded on December 21, 1972. The Hansung University is located in Seongbuk District and Jongno District, Seoul.

== Timeline ==
=== 1945–1989 ===
- September 25, 1945 Acquired Kyungsung Girl's Art School
- October 5, 1945 Founded Hansung Academy Foundation
- April 9, 1946 Licensed for Hansung Girl's and High School
- August 11, 1951 Changed the school name to Hansung Girl's Middle and High School
- December 7, 1963 Completed the indoor gymnasium
- December 21, 1972 Founded Hansung Woman's University
- January 11, 1978 Changed the school name from Hansung Woman's University to Hansung University
- December 29, 1981 Completed the Administrative Hall
- October 5, 1983 Ground breaking ceremony for Student Welfare Hall
- December 4, 1985 Newly established R.O.T.C.
- July 1986 Expanded and moved the school building
- August 25, 1987 Completed the construction of Woochongwan
- November 30, 1987 Licensed to establish the Graduate School of Business Administration and Public Administration
- November 30, 1988 Separated and increased the size of Graduate School of Business Administration and the Graduate School of Public Administration
- November 6, 1989 Newly established Graduate School

=== 1990–1999 ===
- February 27, 1990 Completed the Science Hall and opened Electronic Computation Office
- June 14, 1991 Opened the Exhibition Hall of Agricultural Life History
- November 29, 1991 Completed the Symbolic Tower of Hansung Academy
- December 1991 Recruited for first semester and second semester for 1992
- March 1993 Promoted to comprehensive university
- October 1993 Established Graduate School of Arts
- October 1995 Established Graduate School of International Trade and Information
- October 1996 6 colleges, 16 majors, 14 departments, newly admitted students of 1,230
- November 1998 Newly established Real Estate Department; Newly established Fashion Art Department at Graduate School of Arts; Reorganized to 6 colleges, 16 majors, 15 departments, newly admitted students of 1,620
- January 1999 Converted 30% of evening students to daytime students; Recruited for 960 day students and 660 evening students
- March 6, 1999 Completed the lecture building
- October 17, 1999 Helmut Schmidt, Former Prime Minister of West Germany, visited (conferring honorary degree)
- November 1999 Revised Graduate School of International Trade and Information to Graduate School of International Affairs

=== 2000–present ===
- February 7, 2000 Selected as the most outstanding college in the comprehensive assessment of colleges in 1999
- February. 7, 2000 Newly established Graduate School of Real Estate
- October 2000 Newly established Graduate School of Education
- September 13, 2001 Dr. Lee Sang-Hee inaugurated as the 10th chairman of the board of trustees
- September 22, 2001 Purchased the Daehangno campus
- October 24, 2001 Groundbreaking ceremony of Faculty Hall, Library and Annex Hall of Student Hall
- October 15, 2002 Dr. Han Wan-Sang inaugurated as the 4th president
- September 2002 Completed the Research Hall (Faculty Hall)
- December 2002 Completed Inseonggwan (Student Community Unit)
- July 1, 2003 Acquired the ISO 9001 Certification
- October 2003 Completed New Library Building
- March 2, 2015 Dr. Lee Jong-Hoon inaugurated as the 15th chairman of the board of trustees
- February 1, 2016 Dr. Lee Sang-Han inaugurated as the 8th president

== Academics ==
=== Undergraduate colleges ===
==== College of Humanities ====
- Division of Korean language & Literature (Day & Evening)
  - Major in Korean Language and Literature
  - Major in Applied-Korean language
- Division of English language & Literature (Day & Evening)
  - Major in English Linguistics
  - Major in English Literature
- Division of History and Culture (Day & Evening)
  - Major in Korean History and Culture
  - Major in East Asian History and Culture
  - Major in Euro-American History and Culture
- Division of Knowledge & Information Science (Day & Evening)
  - Major in Library & Information Science
  - Major in Archives and Records Management College of Social Sciences

==== College of Social Science ====
- Division of Business Administration (Day & Evening)
  - Major in Business Administration
  - Major in Information & Management
- Division of Public Administration and Economics (Day & Evening)
  - Major in Public Administration
  - Major in Economics and Information
- Division of International Trade and Real Estate (Day & Evening)
  - Major in International Trade
  - Major in Real Estate

==== College of Arts ====
- Department of Dancing
- Department of Painting
  - Major in Eastern Painting
  - Major in Western Painting
- Division of Media Design Contents
  - Major in Hyper Media Design
  - Major in Animation & Product Interaction
  - Major in Interior Design
- Division of Fashion Design & Business (Day & Evening)
  - Major in Fashion Design
  - Major in Apparel Fashion & Business

=== College of Engineering ===
- Division of Computer Engineering (Day & Evening)
  - Major in Multimedia Information Processing
  - Major in Computer System
- Division of Information Engineering (Day & Evening)
  - Major in Information & Communications Engineering
  - Major in Software System
- Division of Industrial & Mechanical Systems Engineering (Day & Evening)
  - Major in Industrial Engineering
  - Major in Mechanical Systems Engineering

== See also ==
- List of universities and colleges in South Korea
