= Wait on Me (EP) =

- Digital cover

EP by Kai
- Released: April 21, 2025
- Studios: SM Aube (Seoul); SM Big Shot (Seoul); SM Droplet (Seoul); SM Yellow Tail (Seoul)
- Genres: K-pop; R&B
- Length: 19:17
- Language: Korean
- Labels: SM; Kakao
- Producers: Tido Nguyen; Xay; Elias Edman; srlemos; Kerim "Spacey Kay" Wilhelm; Keith Sorrells; Oak Felder; Nico the Owl; Max; Imad Royal; Hunter Madrid

Kai chronology
| Rover (2023) | Wait on Me (2025) |

Singles from Wait on Me
- 1. "Adult Swim" Released: April 3, 2025; 2. "Wait on Me" Released: April 21, 2025

Wait on Me is the fourth extended play by South Korean singer Kai, released on April 21, 2025, by SM Entertainment. The EP contains seven tracks including two singles, "Adult Swim" and "Wait on Me".

== Background and release ==
According to SM Entertainment's third quarter earnings report in November 2024, Kai would be releasing a new EP in the first quarter of 2025.

On March 5, 2025, Star News reported that Kai was preparing for his comeback in music scene in April 2025, with music video scheduled to film next week. On March 31, SM Entertainment confirmed the release date of Kai's fourth EP to be on April 21. In addition, the EP has a total of seven tracks including the title track of the same name and the first single "Adult Swim" to be released 19 days prior. The pre-orders also began at various online and offline music stores. On April 1, the website 'Behind Wait' (kai-waitonme.com) was created in conjunction with Kai's fourth EP and the schedule of various contents of the EP. The next day, Kai confirmed to hold his first showcase since debuting as a soloist in 2020 at Yes24 Live Hall in Gwangjin District, Seoul from 20:00 (KST) and would also be live stream online through Exo's YouTube and Weverse channels.

The pre-release single "Adult Swim" was released along with its music video on April 3. A music video for the b-side song "Walls Don't Talk" was released on April 15.

The title track "Wait On Me" was released on April 21 alongside the full album.

== Reception ==
Bandwagon Asia called the album "the K-pop album of the year." The Hollywood Reporter named the pre-release single "Adult Swim" one of the best K-pop songs of 2025, calling it "the breath of fresh air 2025 needed". Dazed included the b-side song "Off And Away" in its list of the 30 best K-pop songs of 2025, calling it "hypnotic" and "lush."

== Track listing ==
Wait on Me track listing
| No. | Title | Lyrics | Music | Arrangement | Length |
|---|---|---|---|---|---|
| 1. | "Wait on Me" | Bang Hye-hyun | Tido Nguyen; Xay; Rachel West; Jacob Aaron (The Hub) | Tido; Xay | 3:14 |
| 2. | "Walls Don't Talk" | Jeong Ha-ri | Elias Edman; Noak Hellsing; Andrew Tyler | Edman | 2:50 |
| 3. | "Pressure" | Park Tae-won | Jean Cardentey; Randy Class; Ross-Emmanuel Bayeto; Joseph Charles | Kerim "Spacey Kay" Willhelm | 2:24 |
| 4. | "Ridin'" | Jellybean (153/Joombas) | Warren "Oak" Felder; Kareem James; Keith "Ten4" Sorrells; Alex Vincent Niceforo; Jared Lee | Oak; Alex Nice; Ten4 | 2:38 |
| 5. | "Off and Away" | Ji Yu-jin (Jam Factory) | Nico Farmakalidis; Rachel West | Nico the Owl | 3:21 |
| 6. | "Adult Swim" | Jeong Si-on (Lalala Studio) | Imad-Roy El-Amine; Max; Brandon Colbein | Imad Royal; Max | 2:25 |
| 7. | "Flight to Paris" | Woo Seung-yeon | Tido Nguyen; Hunter Madrid; Dominic Scott; TMM | Tido; Madrid | 2:25 |
| Total length: | | | | | 19:17 |

== Credits and personnel ==
Credits adapted from the EP's liner notes.

Studio

- SM Yellow Tail Studio – recording (1), digital editing (2)
- SM Droplet Studio – recording (1, 4–5), digital editing (3–4), engineered for mix (4)
- SM Aube Studio – recording (2, 6)
- SM Azure Studio – recording (2, 6), digital editing (7)
- SM Big Shot Studio – recording (3–4, 7), digital editing, engineered for mix (1), mixing (3)
- SM Lvyin Studio – recording (3)
- Doobdoob Studio – recording (4, 7)
- SM Wavelet Studio – digital editing (5), engineered for mix (5, 7)
- SM Starlight Studio – digital editing (6), mixing (6–7)
- SM Blue Cup Studio – mixing (1–2)
- SM Concert Hall Studio – mixing (4)
- SM Blue Ocean Studio – mixing (5)
- 821 Sound – mastering (all)

Personnel

- Kai – vocals (all), background vocals (all)
- Nicolas Farmakalidis a.k.a. NicoTheOwl (Number K) – programming (5)
- Junny – background vocals (2, 4, 6–7)
- Dominic Scott – background vocals (7)
- Young Chance – vocal directing (1), background vocals (1, 5)
- Kyung Da-som – vocal directing (2, 6)
- Emily Yeonseo Kim – vocal directing (3, 5)
- Kim Tae-hyun a.k.a. PIT300 – vocal directing (4)
- Jsong – vocal directing (7)
- Noh Min-ji – recording (1), digital editing (2)
- Kim Joo-hyun – recording (1, 4–5), digital editing (3–4), engineered for mix (4)
- Kim Hyo-joon – recording (2)
- Jung Eui-seok – recording (2, 6), mixing (1–2)
- Kim Jae-yeon – recording (2, 6), digital editing (7)
- Lee Min-kyu – recording (3–4, 7), digital editing (1), engineered for mix (1), mixing (3)
- Lee Ji-hong – recording (3)
- Kim Ji-hyun – recording (4, 7)
- Kang Eun-ji – digital editing (5), engineered for mix (5, 7)
- Jeong Yoo-ra – digital editing (6), mixing (6–7)
- Nam Koong-jin – mixing (4)
- Kim Cheol-sun – mixing (5)
- Kwon Nam-woo – mastering (all)

== Charts ==
=== Weekly charts ===
Weekly chart performance for Wait on Me
| Chart (2025) | Peak position |
|---|---|
| Japanese Albums (Oricon) | 21 |
| Japanese Combined Albums (Oricon) | 1 |
| Japanese Download Albums (Billboard Japan) | 11 |
| Japanese Top Albums Sales (Billboard Japan) | 19 |
| South Korean Albums (Circle) | 2 |
| UK Album Downloads (Official Charts) | 70 |

=== Monthly charts ===
Monthly chart performance for Wait on Me
| Chart (2025) | Position |
|---|---|
| South Korean Albums (Circle) | 4 |

=== Year-end charts ===
Year-end chart performance for Wait on Me
| Chart (2025) | Position |
|---|---|
| South Korean Albums (Circle) | 88 |

== Release history ==
Release history for Wait on Me
| Region | Date | Format | Label |
|---|---|---|---|
| South Korea | April 21, 2025 | CD | SM; Kakao |
| Various | April 21, 2025 | Digital Download; streaming | SM |
