= Ten discography =

- Ten in 2026
- EPs: 3
- Singles: 9
- Music videos: 9

The Thai singer and dancer Ten has released three extended plays and nine singles.

== Extended plays ==
=== Korean-language extended plays ===
List of Korean-language extended plays, with selected details, chart positions, and sales figures
Title	Details	Peak chart positions				Sales
Title	Details	KOR	JPN	JPN Hot	UK Dig.	Sales
Ten	Released: February 13, 2024; Label: SM; Formats: CD, digital download, streaming	3	6	5	2	KOR: 178,891; JPN: 11,850
Stunner	Released: March 24, 2025; Label: SM; Formats: CD, digital download, streaming	2	18	—	—	KOR: 176,158; JPN: 4,404
"—" denotes a recording that did not chart or was not released in that territory.

=== Japanese-language extended plays ===
List of Japanese-language extended plays, with selected details, chart positions, and sales figures
Title	Details	Peak chart positions		Sales
Title	Details	JPN	JPN Hot	Sales
Humanity	Released: April 23, 2025; Label: Avex Trax; Formats: CD, digital download, streaming	3	40	JPN: 18,944

== Singles ==
=== As lead artist ===
List of singles as lead artist, with selected chart positions and sales, showing album name and year released
Title	Year	Peak chart positions					Album
Title	Year	THL	KOR	JPN Hot	UK Dig.	US World	Album
"Dream in a Dream" (夢中夢/몽중몽)	2017	—	—	—	—	5	NCT 2018 Empathy
"New Heroes"	2018	—	—	—	—	4	Non-album singles
"Paint Me Naked"	2021	—	— (Note: "Paint Me Naked" did not enter the Gaon Digital Chart, but peaked at number 34 on the Gaon Download Chart.)	— (Note: "Paint Me Naked" did not enter the Japan Hot 100, but peaked at number 38 on the Billboard Japan Download Songs chart.)	—	—	Non-album singles
"Birthday"	2022	—	— (Note: "Birthday" did not enter the Circle Digital Chart, but peaked at number 43 on the Circle Download Chart.)	— (Note: "Birthday" did not enter the Japan Hot 100, but peaked at number 44 on the Billboard Japan Download Songs chart.)	—	—	Non-album singles
"Nightwalker"	2024	—	121	—	56	—	Ten
"Stunner"	2025	11	102	—	—	—	Stunner
"Silence"	2025	—	—	—	—	—	Humanity
"If You Don't Mean It" (ถ้าไม่คิด อย่าทำให้คิด)	2026	—	—	—	—	—	Non-album singles
"Outwest"	2026	—	—	— (Note: "Outwest" did not enter the Japan Hot 100, but peaked at number 44 on the Billboard Japan Download Songs chart.)	—	—	Non-album singles
"—" denotes releases that did not chart or were not released in that region.

=== As featured artist ===
Title	Year	Peak chart position	Album
Title	Year	KOR Down.	Album
"The Riot" (DJ Ginjo featuring Ten and Xiaojun of WayV)	2020	—	Non-album single
"Obsession" (Minnie featuring Ten of WayV)	2024	42	Her
"You Give Me a Butterfly" (Blue Pongtiwat featuring Ten)	2026	—	Non-album single
"—" denotes releases that did not chart or were not released in that region.

== Promotional singles ==
Title	Year	Peak chart positions	Album
Title	Year	KOR	Album
"Swipe" (Prod. by C-Young, Alawn) (with Taeyong)	2023	199	Street Woman Fighter 2 OST Part 2

== Other charted songs ==
List of other charted songs, with selected chart positions and sales, showing album name and year released
Title	Year	Peak chart positions		Album
Title	Year	KOR Down.	UK Dig.	Album
"Water"	2024	—	50	Ten
"Dangerous"	2024	—	49	Ten
"On Ten"	2024	—	53	Ten
"Shadow"	2024	—	52	Ten
"Lie with You"	2024	—	61	Ten
"Enough for Me"	2025	186	—	Stunner
"Bambola"	2025	143	—	Stunner
"Sweet as Sin"	2025	196	—	Stunner
"Waves"	2025	174	—	Stunner
"Butterfly"	2025	183	—	Stunner
"Stunner" (English version)	2025	160	—	Stunner
"—" denotes releases that did not chart or were not released in that region.

== Music videos ==
=== As lead artist ===
List of music videos as lead artist showing year released and directors
Title	Year	Director(s)	Ref.
"Change" (As TNT from Teen Superstar)	2010	Unknown	
"Dream in a Dream"	2017	Lee Jun-woo (Saltfilm)	
"New Heroes"	2018	Jinooya	
"Paint Me Naked"	2021	Kwon Yong-soo (Saccharin Film)	
"Birthday"	2022	Lee Yong-seok (What's Worth Studio)	
"Nightwalker"	2024	Kim Young (Aedia Studio)	
"Bambola"	2025	Hong Jae-hwan, Lee Hye-su (Swisher Film)	
"Stunner"	2025	Kim Young(YVNG WING) (IDIOTS)	

=== As featuring artist ===
List of music videos as featuring artist showing year released and directors
Title	Year	Director(s)	Ref.
"The Riot" (DJ Ginjo featuring Ten, Xiaojun of WayV)	2020	Aezik (Madscene)	
