= Bada Lee =

Souht Korean dancer (born 1995)

- 바다리
- Lee in 2025
- Born: September 22, 1995 (age 31); Incheon, South Korea
- Occupations: Dancer; choreographer; performance director
- Years active: 2020–present
- Agents: The L1ve; Jam Republic
- Height: 1.76 m (5 ft 9 in)

Bada Lee (Korean: 이바다; born September 22, 1995), known mononymously as Bada, is a South Korean dancer and choreographer. She is the leader of the dance crew BEBE, winners of Mnet's television competition Street Woman Fighter 2 (2023). Bada has choreographed for various K-pop artists, including Aespa's "Next Level", "Drama", and "Supernova", Kai's "Rover" and "Wait On Me", NCT x Aespa's "Zoo", Babymonster's "Sheesh", Taemin's "Guilty", EXO's "Crown" and "Crazy", and Ten's "Birthday". She is now a brand ambassador for Jordan.

== Early life ==
Bada was born on September 22, 1995, the younger of two sisters. She attended Shinhyeon Girls' Middle School and later studied at Incheon Choeun High School. She enjoyed dancing in her elementary school, and in her early high school years she enrolled in her first formal dance class when a dance academy opened in her neighborhood. J-Ho of JustJerk, one of the founding members of the JustJerk hip-hop dance crew, inspired her to pursue a career in dance.

== Career ==
=== 2015–2022: Beginnings ===
In 2015, at age 19, Bada joined the dance crew Cupcakes, alongside 1 Million Dance Studio choreographer Redy. Under the guidance of Girin Jang, the team participated in various dance competitions and won several awards. While actively performing as a member of Cupcakes, Bada also began teaching dance classes at Soul Dance Studio, a dance academy founded by the crew's leader. Cupcakes later disbanded in 2016 for undisclosed reasons, but Bada continued to establish her reputation as a dance instructor, becoming a prominent presence at several major academies, notably JustJerk Dance Academy and URBANPLAY Dance Academy.

Bada later became involved in the K-pop industry, providing dance training for trainees and established artists, including Lee Hyori, while also working as a choreographer and performance director. During the early years of her career as a choreographer, she worked primarily with artists under SM Entertainment, including Aespa, Exo, and NCT. Several of her choreographies received significant attention on social media platforms and were associated with viral dance trends, notably Aespa's "Next Level", Kai's "Peaches", Ten's "Birthday", NCT U's "90s Love", and NCT x Aespa's "Zoo".

Following her earlier career, Bada formed her own dance crew, BEBE, which initially began with five members, including Lusher and Tatter, with the goal of dancing together in a supportive and collaborative environment. The group was later finalized with original members Bada, Lusher, and Tatter, and new members Kyma, Minah, Cheche, and Sowon.

=== 2023: Breakthrough ===
Bada gained broader public recognition after appearing with BEBE on the second season of Mnet's dance competition series, Street Woman Fighter 2. Following the program's premiere on August 22, 2023, she experienced increased public attention. According to Fundex, an online media analytics agency, Bada ranked first among the most talked-about non-drama television and OTT personalities during the week of September 4th, 2023.

Bada became known for her distinctive visual appearance and performance style, characterized by two-toned hair and a height of 176 cm (5'9''). Her technical ability was highlighted in the second episode, where she secured the Main Dancer position during the Rank Mission, which allowed her to direct the Leader Dance Video. She was selected as the main dancer among several internationally recognized choreographers, including Kirsten from Royal Family and Lia Kim from 1 Million.

Upon the video's release, Bada received positive responses from fellow dancers and judges, with Judge Mike Song describing the performance as a "masterpiece". She received a perfect score of 300 points from the judging panel. Her choreography for the mission song "Smoke" by Dynamic Duo attracted widespread attention, with artists such as BTS's V and Jung Kook, BigBang's Taeyang, and members of NCT and Itzy participating in the challenges.

Bada's leadership during the competition was noted by viewers and commentators. From the beginning of Street Woman Fighter 2, BEBE was considered one of the youngest teams in the competition, as most of its members were born after 2000. Despite being nicknamed "Bada and the Kids" and receiving criticism that the team relied heavily on its leader, BEBE continues proving their skills episode by episode with their unique trendiness, energy, and teamwork.

BEBE placed first in the K-pop Death Match Mission, Hwasa's New Song Draft Mission and Battle Performance Mission, securing a place in the final. On October 31, 2023, BEBE was announced as the winning crew during the live finale, among the four finalists: Jam Republic, 1 Million, and Mannequeen.

Following Street Woman Fighter 2, Bada remained active in the dance industry as both a dancer and choreographer. She participated in Street Woman Fighter 2: On the Stage. and worked as a choreographer on songs such as Taemin's "Guilty" and Aespa's "Drama". She was also invited to appear as a guest performer of Fuerza Bruta, a theatrical show, during its South Korea stop. Bada later joined the production for multiple city stops while simultaneously participating in the Street Woman Fighter 2: On the Stage tour.

=== 2024–present: Rising popularity ===
In 2024, Bada expanded her activities within the entertainment industry while continuing her work as a choreographer. She launched her YouTube channel on April 17, 2024, with the first episode featuring NCT member Taeyong. On May 3, 2024, management company The L1ve announced that BEBE had joined its roster of artists, alongside figures such as Zerobaseone's Sung Han-bin and Mamamoo's Wheein.

In the same year, Bada joined the Korea Dance Association, led by 1Million Dance Studio, with the goal of developing a profit distribution structure for choreography copyrights in the K-pop industry. She later participated as a dance director in JTBC's boy group survival program Project 7, contributing as dance teacher, stage director, and choreographer. She also appeared in several dance videos with BTS members V and Jung Kook, one of which surpassed 25 million views within 24 hours.

In 2025, Bada served as a performance director and choreographer alongside Jrick Baek for Kai's album, contributing to the tracks "Adult Swim" and "Wait On Me". She also appeared as a dancer during music show performances for both songs in April 2025. In May 2025, Bada and Jrick worked as stage directors for Kai's world tour, KAION, which was held in multiple cities worldwide. In the same year, Bada announced her first solo concert, titled Bada Lee: Deep Blue. She also joined Project LEE Dance Academy as a regular instructor.

Bada and her dance crew BEBE additionally performed at large-scale festivals, including Waterbomb Seoul and Waterbomb Singapore, and were selected as the opening act for the NBA China Games 2025 in Macau. She is now participating on Mnet new dance program named "STREET WORLD FIGHTER: Directors’ War" as Director BADA and got 4th Place.

== Personal life ==
Bada's life's motto is "Today Is the Youngest Day of My Life" (Korean: "오늘이 내 남은 인생 중에 가장 어린 날").

== Credits ==
=== As choreographer ===
Year	Artist	Song	Notes	Ref.
2026	RIIZE	"Overdrive"	With Jaeyong	
2026	P1Harmony	"Blow Up"		
2026	Rescene	"Inside Out"	With Tatter, Kyma, Sowon (BEBE)	
2026	Ateez	"DRIP"		
2026	Sung Hanbin	"Undead"		
2026	Taeyong	"Wacka Wack"	With Baek Kooyoung	
2026	Taeyang	"BAD"		
2026	Exo	"Crown"	As Performance Director With Jrick Baek	
2026	Exo	"Crazy"	With Lusher, Sowon	
2026	Milli (Feat. Omega Sapien)	"MSG"	With Team BEBE	
2026	PLAVE	"Born Savage"	With Kyma	
2025	Zerobaseone	"Devil Game"		
2025	Zerobaseone	"Lovesick Game"		
2025	Zerobaseone	"Extra"		
2025	Nmixx	"Know About Me"	With Lusher, Tatter, Minah (BEBE)	
2025	Kai	"Adult Swim"	As performance director With Jrick Baek	
2025	Kai	"Wait On Me"	As performance director With Jrick Baek	
2025	Riize	"Bag Bad Back"	With Shotaro	
2025	Enhypen	"Outside"		
2025	Aespa	"Dirty Work"		
2025	BoyNextDoor	"Hollywood Action"		
2025	Cha Eun-woo	"Saturday Preacher"	With Lusher, Kyma (BEBE)	
2025	Sung Hanbin x Kyoka	"Bad Boy (Mama Ver.)"	With Lusher	
2024	Baby Monster	"Sheesh"		
2024	Baby Monster	"Forever"		
2024	Seventeen	"Maestro"		
2024	Aespa	"Supernova"		
2024	Ive	"Accendio"		
2024	Sung Han-bin	"Bad Boy"	As performance director With Jrick Baek	
2024	The Boyz	"Trigger"		
2024	Momo	"Money In My Pocket"		
2024	Project 7	"Run (Up to You)"	As performance director With RyuD	
2024	Project 7	"Breaking News"	As performance director	
2024	Project 7	"Time After Time"	As performance director	
2024	Project 7	"Antidote"	As performance director With Lusher, Tatter, Minah (BEBE)	
2024	Project 7	"Act Up"	As performance director With BEBE	
2023	DKB	"Turning Point"		
2023	Kai	"Rover"	As performance director With Jrick Baek	
2023	Kai	"Slidin'"		
2023	Kai	"Bomba"		
2023	Treasure T5	"Move"		
2023	NCT Dream	"ISTJ"		
2023	Hyolyn	"Chemistry"	With BEBE	
2023	Dynamic Duo (feat Lee Young-ji)	"Smoke"		
2023	Hwasa	"Chilli"	With BEBE	
2023	Treasure T5	"Move"		
2023	Riize	"Talk Saxy"	With Jrick Baek	
2023	Taemin	"Guilty"	With Jrick Baek	
2023	WayV	"On My Youth"		
2023	Aespa	"Drama"		
2023	xooos	"Crush!"	With Lusher, Minah (BEBE)	
2022	Taeyong	"Lonely"	As performance director	
2022	Taeyong	"Ghost"	As performance director	
2022	Taeyong	"Moonlight"		
2022	Taeyong, Wonstein	"Love Theory"	As performance director	
2022	Very Very	"Undercover"		
2022	Aespa	"Illusion"		
2022	Aespa	"Girls"		
2022	The Boyz	"Whisper"		
2022	NCT 127	"Faster"		
2022	Ten	"Birthday"	As performance director	
2022	WayV	"Phantom"		
2022	SMTOWN Kai, Seulgi, Jeno, Karina	"Hot & Cold"	With Jrick Baek	
2021	Mire (Tri.be)		Prologue Film	
2021	Aespa	"Next Level"		
2021	Aespa	"Savage"	As performance director	
2021	WayV	"Action Figure"		
2021	Shotaro (Riize)	"Wake Up"		
2021	Xiaojun (WayV)	"Good Time"		
2021	Kai	"Peaches"	As performance director	
2021	Kai	"Jekyll (Kai Ver.)"		
2021	The Boyz	"Maverick"		
2021	Karina (Aespa)		2021 MAMA Awards Opening	
2021	SMTOWN NCT x Aespa	"ZOO"	With Taeyong	
2020	NCT U	"90's Love"	As performance director	
2020	Kai	"Reason"		
2020	NCT Dream	"Deja Vu"		
2020	Shownu x Ten		2020 MBC Music Festival Special Stage	

=== As performer ===
Year	Event	Artist	Song	Ref.
2020	[XR라이브]	Kai	"Reason"	
2021	2021 SMTOWN Concert	Kai	"Reason"	
2021	CL Dance Performance Video	CL	"Spicy"	
2021	<KAI: KLoor>	Kai		
2022	KAI Dancer	Kai	"Mmmh"	
2023	KAI Japan Special Live 2023	Kai		
2023	[aKAIve]	Kai		
2023	Music Bank	V	"Slow Dancing"	
2023	2023 MBC Gayo Daejejeon Hyoyeon x BEBE	Hyoyeon	"Picture"	
2024	LYNK-POP: THE VR CONCERT KAI	Kai		
2024	M Countdown	Taemin	"Sexy In the Air"	
2024	2024 MAMA Awards	Ni-Ki (Enhypen)		
2024	Waterbom Singapore	Team BEBE		
2024	2024 MAMA Awards	G-Dragon		
2024	SBS Gayo Daejeon	G-Dragon		
2025	M Countdown	G-Dragon	"Too Bad"	
2025	M Countdown	Kai	"Adut Swim"	
2025	2025 SBS Inkigayo Unicon in Tokyo Dome	Kai	"Adut Swim"	
2025	Music Bank	Kai	"Wait On Me"	
2025	<KAION>	Kai	As a Director	
2025	Waterbom Singapore	Team BEBE		

== Awards and nominations ==
Year	Awards Events	Awards Categories	Note	Ref
2015	Feedback Competition VOL.3	2nd place	Cupcake	
2023	Street Woman Fighter 2	Winner	BEBE	
2023	2023 MAMA Awards	Bibigo Culture & Style Award	Street Woman Fighter 2 cast	
2024	2024 Feedback Korea Dance Awards	Best Dance Challenge Award		
2024	2024 Feedback Korea Dance Awards	Iconic of the Year Award		
2024	2024 Universal Superstar Awards	Universal Performance Icon	BEBE	
2024	2024 MAMA Awards	Best Choreography	Aespa – "Supernova"	
2024	2024 Choreo Awards	Best Dance Star of the Year Award		
2025	The 16th Korea Popular Culture and Arts Awards	Minister of Culture, Sports and Tourism Award	BEBE	

== Live performances ==
=== Concerts ===
Year	Title	Notes	Ref.
2023	SWF2: On the Stage	with SWF2 Teams	
2024	Street Dancing Queen	BEBE, Mannequeen, HOOK, Holy Bang	
2025	Bada Lee: Deep Blue	Solo	

== Filmography ==
=== Television shows ===
Year	Program	Notes	Ref.
2023	K-pop Generation	Interviewer	
2023	Street Woman Fighter 2	Cast (with BEBE) + Final Winner	
2023	Street Dance Girls Fighter 2	Master (with BEBE)	
2023	Street Woman Fighter 2 Worldwide Log	Cast (with BEBE)	
2023	2023 MAMA Awards	Collaboration Stage with SWF2 Leader (Day 1)	
2023	2023 MAMA Awards	Collaboration Stage with Huh Yunjin (Le Sserafim), Xiaoting (Kep1er), Monika, Minnie ((G)I-dle) (Day 2)	
2023	Knowing Bros	With SWF2 Leader episode 411	
2023	2023 MBC Music Festival: Record of Dreams	Collaboration Stage with Hyoyeon (Girls Generation)	
2024	The Seasons - Lee Hyori's Red Carpet	Guest (with BEBE)	
2024	2024 Universal Superstar Awards	Winning Universal Performance Icon with BEBE	
2024	Immortal Songs 2	Collaboration Stage with Rocky and become a final winner episode 670	
2024	Weekly Idol	With BEBE episode 678	
2024	Street Women Fighter Vietnam	Guest episode 6	
2024	2024 Chuseok Special Idol Star Athletics Championships	'Breaking Dance' Category with DKB Harry June and Junseo	
2024	Project 7	Director	
2024	2024 MAMA Awards	Collaboration Stage with Ni-Ki Enhypen (Day 1) Dancer for G-Dragon Stage (Day 2)	
2024	SBS Gayo Daejeon	Dancer for G-Dragon Stage	
2025	M Countdown	Bada Lee x Ten (WayV) x Juyeon (The Boyz) x Koko (Izna) Collaboration Stage	
2025	Mnet 30th Anniversary Chart Show	Guest	
2025	World of Street Women Fighters	Participate in BUMSUP Mega Crew Mission Judge (Mission 9: "World Finale with JYP Mission")	
2026	STREET WORLD FIGHTER: Directors’ War	Cast	

=== Radio ===
Year	Date	Network	Program	Notes	Ref.
2023	November 1	SBS Power FM	Two O'Clock Escape Cultwo Show	with Lia Kim, Funky Y	
2024	June 4	SBS Love FM	Park Se-mi's Chatterbox	with Lusher, Tatter	
2024	August 16	SBS Power FM	Young Street	solo	
2025	August 28	Mediacorp 987fm	Jo and Shonia Session	with BEBE, team Jam Republic	

=== Music video appearances ===
Year	Artist	Song	Ref.
2020	Sehun	"On Me"	
2020	Loco	"Waiting Room"	
2020	Kai	"FILM: KAI (Reason)"	
2021	Lisa	"LILI'S FILM"	
2021	Xiaojun	"Good Time"	
2021	CL	"Spicy"	
2022	Taeyong	"Lonely"	
2022	Taeyong	"Ghost"	
2023	Street Woman Fighter 2	"Smoke"	
2024	Jaehyun	"Smoke"	
2024	JAESSBEE	"너와의 모든 지금"	
2025	G-Dragon	"Too Bad"	
2025	Kai	"Wait On Me"	
2026	STREET WORLD FIGHTER: Directors’ War	"Royalty"	

== Advertisements ==
=== Ambassadorships ===
Year	Brand	Notes	Ref.
2023	The North Face	The North Face White Label Ambassador	
2024	Nick & Nicole	Ambassador	
2025	Nick & Nicole	Ambassador	
2025	Nike Jordan	Air Jordan 11 Pearl	
2026	Nike Jordan	Air Jordan 6 Infrared	
2026	Garnier	Garnier Color Naturals K-Glow Creamy Nudes	

=== Endorsements ===
Year	Brand	Advertisement Name	Ref
2021	SONY x Capital Radio Tunes	Sony x Capital Radio Tunes Collaboration Collection	
2021	YESEYESEE	Instagram ads	
2021	Archive Bold	Archive Bold 939	
2023	Dauspice	STEP #12 [BATTLE]	
2023	dustblow	1st Season "Unite" Video	
2023	Archive Bold	23SS CAMPAIGN	
2023	Sudden Attack	Sudden Woman Fighter	
2023	Kitkat	KitKat Gold	
2023	Yves Saint Laurent Beauty	Yves Saint Laurent Holiday	
2023	Anov	Anove Hair Treatment	
2023	The North Face	The North Face White Label	
2024	The Hyundai Seoul	A Sound to the Future: The Hyundai Seoul's 3rd Anniversary	
2024	MAC	Maximal Matte Lipstick	
2024	L'Oréal Paris	Total Repair 5 Hair Pack	
2024	Visit Singapore	Jam Republic's Bada Lee & Kirsten Dodgen in #VisitSingapore	
2024	Critic	CRITICxBEBE COLLAB	
2024	Calvin Klein	Calvin Klein Modern Cotton	
2024	Malibu	Malibu Orange	
2024	Nick & Nicole	24F/W COLLECTION "90'S BUTTERFLY"	Lookbook
2024	MLB	2024 MLB KOREA PROMOTION	
2024	The North Face	The North Face White Label	
2024	Nick & Nicole	Nick & Nicole X Bebe WINTER PART2	Lookbook
2024	Visit Singapore	The Dancing Queens are BACK!	
2024	Lacoste	Lacoste FW24	
2025	Nick & Nicole	Nick & Nicole x Bebe 101 Dalmatians Disney Collaboration Collection	Lookbook
2025	Terra	Terra Soju Beer Water Mini	
2025	Visit Singapore	F1 Singapore	
2025	NBA China Games	Team Bebe as a Opening Performance	
2026	Stone Island	AW'026 Collection Press Day	
2026	Nike Jordan	Air Jordan Low SE "Spruce Fog/Jade Stone"	
2026	BYREDO	Byredo Car Diffuser	
2026	EX NIHILO PARIS	Demon Dancer	

=== Magazines ===
Year	Magazine	Issue Number	Notes	Ref
2023	W Korea	November Issue		
2023	Vogue Korea	December Issue		
2023	Harper's Bazaar Korea	December Issue		
2023	Olive Young Magazine	December Issue		
2024	Harper's Bazaar Korea	March Issue		
2026	Vogue Korea		Uniqlo's 2026 Fall/Winter Outerwear BOLD & VARIETY'	
