= Street Woman Fighter 2 =

2023 South Korean reality dance series

- Season 3
- Promotional poster
- Native name
- Hangul: 스트릿 우먼 파이터 2
- RR: Seuteurit umeon paiteo 2
- MR: Sŭt'ŭrit umŏn p'ait'ŏ 2
- Presented by: Kang Daniel
- Judges: Shownu; Monika
- No. of teams: 8
- Winner: Bebe (Note: Members: Bada, Lusher, Tatter, Kyma, Minah, Cheche, Sowon)
- No. of episodes: 10 + 1 Special Episode

Release
- Original network: Mnet
- Original release: August 22 – October 31, 2023

Season chronology
- ← Previous; Street Man Fighter Next → Stage Fighter

Street Woman Fighter 2 (Korean: 스트릿 우먼 파이터 2), abbreviated as SWF2, is the second season of the South Korean TV dance competition franchise Street Woman Fighter. It aired on Mnet from August 22 to October 31, 2023, every Tuesday in the 22:20 KST time slot for 10 episodes.

It revolves around eight female dance crews fighting for the position of Korea's best female dance crew to represent street dance to the country (loosely marketed under the term "K-dance"). The winning crew (Bebe) received ₩50 million, diamond rings from Amondz and the Street Woman Fighter 2 trophy.

== Cast ==
The program is presented by Kang Daniel.

The dance judges of this season are:

- Shownu (Monsta X) (Note: Shownu did not judge the Battle Performance Mission due to his overseas schedule.)
- Monika (Prowdmon)

In addition to the two dance judges, there are special judges for each mission:

- Mike Song (Kinjaz) (Missions 1–2, 7–8)
- Bae Yoon-Jung (Mission 3)
- Rie Hata (Mission 4)
- Aiki (Hook) (Mission 4)
- Honey J (Holy Bang) and Trix (Prime Kingz) (Mission 6)

=== Special guests ===
==== "Class" mission (episode 2) ====
- DJ Som
- Dynamic Duo
- Crush
- Taeyong and Ten (NCT)
- Miyeon and Yuqi ((G)I-dle)
- Czaer

==== "K-pop Death Match" mission (episode 3–4) ====
- Chaewon, Kazuha, and Eunchae (Le Sserafim)
- Changbin, Han, and Bang Chan (Stray Kids/3Racha)

==== "Mega Crew" mission (episode 5–6) ====
- Sandara Park
- SinB (Viviz)
- Winter (Aespa)
- Yell (YGX) (Note: Yell joined 1Million as one of their choreographers as of this year.)
- Lip J (Prowdmon)
- Hyojin Choi (Want)
- Ingyoo, Insun, Kyungnam, Dophan, and Youngbin (WeDemBoyz)
- Young J and Howl (Just Jerk)

==== "Hwasa Choreography" mission (episode 7) ====
- Hwasa

==== "Battle Performance" mission (episode 8) ====
- Trix (Prime Kingz)
- Honey J (HolyBang)

==== "Global Artist" and "Ending Credit" missions (episode 10) ====
- Taeyong (NCT)
- Kim Jae-hwan
- Nam Ji-hyun
- Back Koo-young (1Million)
- Hyojin Choi (Want)
- Trix (Prime Kingz)
- Zhang Hao, Sung Han-bin, Seok Matthew and Kim Taerae (Zerobaseone)
- Jaejae
- Kwak Yoon-gy
- Dawn Elizabeth Bennet (New Zealand Ambassador to South Korea)
- Yuju
- E-Jo and Ted (Eoddae)
- Limlala as Nilriria Kim (Lia Kim parody), Heo Min-jin as King Bada (Bada parody), Han Ji-won as Haribo (Harimu parody), Na Bo-ram as Gwein Gwein/Guilty Guilt (JJ parody), Yeon Ye-rim as Sadlic (Redlic parody), Kim Ri-an as Oh Deulodeuli/Quake (Audrey parody), Kim Ji-you as AllReddy Callreddy (Redy parody), Hyeji Daeji as Nom/The Guy (Nob parody) (Street Gag Fighter 2 comedians)
- Haesung and Ingyoo (WeDemBoyz)
- Mood Dok (YGX)
- LeoJ

== Contestants ==
Color key:

- Leader
- Sub-Leader

List of Street Woman Fighter contestants
Crew	Name	Birthday	Notes
1Million	Lia Kim (리아킴)	May 24, 1984 (age 42)	Co-founder and chief choreographer of 1Million Dance Studio. Former dance battler known as Funky Lia. Choreographer for Sunmi, Twice, Mamamoo, Hwasa, Lee Hyori, Billlie, Purple Kiss, I.O.I, Itzy, Tri.be and Uhm Jung-hwa. Cast on Fly to the Dance with Henry Lau, YGX's Lee Jung, Hook's Aiki, Love Ran, and fellow members Harimu and Amy
1Million	Harimu (하리무)	March 22, 2003 (age 23)	Former member of Belegacy and disbanded K-Pop group Sparkling. Former Cap-Teen contestant. Participated in Street Dance Girls Fighter as the leader and member of Amazon crew. Choreographer for Mamamoo. Back-up dancer for CL and Jeon Somi, Cast on Fly to the Dance with Henry Lau, YGX's Lee Jung, Hook's Aiki, Love Ran, and fellow members Lia Kim and Amy
1Million	Amy (에이미)	February 23, 1995 (age 31)	Choreographer for Twice's "Set Me Free" music video. Member of Color Dance Team, Cast on Fly to the Dance with Henry Lau, YGX's Lee Jung, Hook's Aiki, Love Ran, and fellow members Lia Kim and Harimu
1Million	Dohee (도희)	September 20, 1997 (age 29)	Dancer for DPR Live's "Hop In" music video. Member of The Bip's crew.
1Million	Debby (데비)	December 16, 1997 (age 28)	Taiwanese member. Originally set to debut as a member of the Taiwanese K-Pop group DAYDAY in 2017, but was cancelled. Back-up dancer for Kai.
1Million	Redy (레디)	January 29, 1999 (age 27)	Back-up dancer for Woodz, Kang Daniel, Shinee, NewJeans, Baekho, NCT U, YooA, Hoshi and Psy. Member of Curohako and TEAM SAME. Former member of Cupcake's Crew
Bebe	Bada (바다)	September 22, 1995 (age 31)	SM Entertainment Performance Director. Choreographer for Super M, Kai, Aespa, NCT, The Boyz, Treasure, Verivery, and DKB. Dance instructor at Project LEE Dance Academy, OFD Studio. Former member of Cupcake's Crew. Joined Jam Republic The Agency in October 2022.
Bebe	Lusher (러셔)	May 2, 2000 (age 26)	Tour and back-up dancer for Kai, Highlight's Lee Gi-kwang, Shinee's Min-ho, Seventeen's Jun, and CL, NCT's Ten, and Viviz. Performance Director and choreographer for Jenna Suhl. Dance instructor at Project LEE Dance Academy, OFD Studio. Joined Jam Republic The Agency in April 2024.
Bebe	Tatter (태터)	June 15, 2001 (age 25)	Tour and back-up dancer for Kai, Choi Yoo-jung, Kai, The Boyz, Got7's Jay B, and Highlight. Performance Director and choreographer for Jenna Suhl, Fromis 9, and Dayoung. Dance instructor at Project LEE Dance Academy, OFD Studio. Joined Jam Republic The Agency in April 2024.
Bebe	Kyma (키마)	May 31, 2001 (age 25)	Member of AlwAysHigH crew. Back-up dancer for Wendy (singer). Dance instructor at OFD Studio.
Bebe	Minah (민아)	December 27, 2002 (age 23)	Tour and back-up dancer for Aespa, Kai, NCT's Ten, and G-Dragon. Performance Director and choreographer for Fromis 9, and Dayoung. Dance instructor at OFD Studio.
Bebe	Cheche (채채)	January 13, 2004 (age 22)	Bada's student. Participated on Show Me the Money 11 as a back-up dancer for Lee Young-ji's live performance of "Witch" Back-up dancer for Aespa, Wendy (singer), and Dayoung.
Bebe	Sowon (소원)	July 14, 2004 (age 22)	Bada's student. Participated on Show Me the Money 11 as a back-up dancer for Lee Young-ji's live performance of "Witch". Back-up dancer for Dayoung. Dance instructor at Project LEE Dance Studio.
Deep N Dap	Mina Myoung (미나명)	April 3, 1991 (age 35)	Former choreographer for 1Million Dance Studio. Founder and CEO of MU:studio. Lead dancer on Jay Park's "All I Wanna Do" music video. Choreographer for Jay Park, Mamamoo, Twice, Red Velvet, Wonder Girls, Suzy, Jessi, Park Bom, and Viviz
Deep N Dap	Downy (다우니)	September 17, 1993 (age 33)	Back-up and tour dancer for SAAY, Chungha, Sik-K, and Woodie Gochild.
Deep N Dap	Soll (쏠)	February 26, 1995 (age 31)	Back-up and tour dancer for Jimin and NU'EST. Formerly known as Jinsol. Also a member of Team onfleek
Deep N Dap	LockerZee (락커지)	June 3, 1997 (age 29)	Professional Locker. Winner of the 2022 Into The Deep Dance Battle (Locking Division)
Deep N Dap	Minny Park (미니팍)	November 25, 1997 (age 28)	Former choreographer for 1Million Dance Studio. Choreographer for Fifty Fifty, Mamamoo, Billlie, Yoon Jong-shin, Jamie, and Everglow. Back-up dancer for Mamamoo
Deep N Dap	JJ (체이체이)	October 14, 1999 (age 27)	Choreographer and back-up dancer for Mamamoo, Hyolyn, Purple Kiss, and Billlie
Deep N Dap	Gooseul (구슬)	August 18, 2001 (age 25)	Choreographer and actress. Former member and choreographer of defunct K-Pop group Girls' Alert. Participated on MIXNINE.
Jam Republic (Note: International Crew)	Kirsten (커스틴)	April 16, 1998 (age 28)	New Zealand member. World-renowned choreographer and dancer for Rihanna and Justin Bieber. Former member of the Royal Family and Request Dance Crew. Back-up dancer for Rihanna, Justin Bieber, CL, Jason Derulo, Nicki Minaj, and more.
Jam Republic	Latrice (라트리스)	January 14, 1999 (age 27)	Australian member. Former member of The Home Base Crew. Former contestant on Street Dance of China Season 4. Back-up dancer for Lay, Cai Xukun, Wang Yibo, and Vava. Choreographer on iQIYI's Idol Producer and Idol Hits and Youku's The Rap of China. Model for brands such as Timberland and Lululemon
Jam Republic	Ling (링)	June 14, 1996 (age 30)	Chinese member. Former member of Royal Family. Main choreographer on Palace Dance Studio
Jam Republic	Emma (엠마)	July 31, 2002 (age 24)	Samoan member.
Jam Republic	Audrey (오드리)	December 30, 2003 (age 22)	American member. Former contestant on NBC's World of Dance Season 3. Back-up dancer for Jackson Wang
LadyBounce	Nob (놉)	May 6, 1994 (age 32)	Member of Afrokorea Family. Back-up dancer for Ravi, Hyoyeon, Hwasa, YUNHWAY, Lil Cherry, and Psy
LadyBounce	Biggy (비기)	July 23, 1995 (age 31)	Dance director and back-up dancer for NMIXX's "Young, Dumb, Stupid" music video
LadyBounce	Vessi (베씨)	November 16, 1994 (age 32)	Tour dancer for Hwasa. Also a member of Kiki House
LadyBounce	Naro (나로)	September 5, 1997 (age 29)	Back-up dancer and co-star for Changmin's "Maniac" music video with other Lady Bounce members.
LadyBounce	Capri (카프리)	June 17, 2000 (age 26)	Back-up dancer for Natty
Mannequeen	Funky Y (펑기와이)	November 11, 1992 (age 34)	Professional waacker. Participated on Street Man Fighter's "Muse of Street Man Fighter" mission with Eo-Ddae. Participated in the first season of Dancing 9 Former member of defunct group Funky Fire.
Mannequeen	Redlic (레드릭)	March 12, 1995 (age 31)	Former member of Belegacy. Former choreographer and dancer for YGX and Just Jerk Dance Crew. Executive Dance Director and choreographer for Aespa. Also the choreographer for Viviz, Got the Beat, Seulgi, and many more.
Mannequeen	Buckey (벅키)	October 29, 1985 (age 41)	Former krumper turned choreographer. Member of Nastyshot and Belegacy crews. Former and founding member of WooFam and Fluckeez. Choreographer and lead dancer for Crush's "Whatever You Do" and "Hug Me" and Dynamic Duo's "BAAAM" Music videos. Also a choreographer for CL, Jessi, Taemin, BtoB's Peniel, and many more.
Mannequeen	Waackxxxy (왁씨)	April 13, 1993 (age 33)	Professional dance battler who have won multiple waacking and freestyle dance battles in South Korea and in other countries. Won at least 500 dance battles in her career. Participated on Street Man Fighter's "Muse of Street Man Fighter" mission with Eo-Ddae. Once served as back-up dancer for Taeyeon and Jung Dae-hyun
Mannequeen	Yoonji (윤지)	December 13, 1996 (age 29)	Professional dance battler. Participated on Street Man Fighter's "Muse of Street Man Fighter" mission with Eo-Ddae. Also a member of Masterpiece and Korea Waackers crews. Participated in the second season of Dancing 9.
Mannequeen	Cera (쎄라)	December 31, 1996 (age 29)	Professional dance battler. Gone viral for her dancing skills with 1.6 million viewers on Instagram. Also a member of SIGNATURE and CTRL crews.
Tsubakill (Note: Japanese Crew)	Akanen (아카넨)	September 24, 1989 (age 37)	Renowned choreographer from Japan. Choreographer for E-girls, ONE CHANCE, °C-ute, Luna, G.E.M., and more. Joined Jam Republic's agency.
Tsubakill	Sayaka (사야카)	March 21, 1987 (age 39)	Dancehall dancer. Participated in Japan's D.League as a member of RIEHATA's Benefitone MONOLIZ dance crew.
Tsubakill	Miki (미키)	December 25, 1988 (age 37)	Tour dancer for 2NE1, BIGBANG, JSB, CrazyBoy, Yurina Kawaguchi, Generations, and SOTA
Tsubakill	Momo (모모)	March 16, 1994 (age 32)	Also a member of Ea dance crew. Former contestant on Street Dance of China Season 4.
Tsubakill	Yumeri (유메리)	January 9, 1996 (age 30)	Winner of the 2023 BODYROCK Junior Dance Competition as the team choreographer. Also a choreographer for Japanese artists Rikimaru Chikada and WARPs Up. Joined Jam Republic's agency.
Tsubakill	Rena (레나)	September 19, 1999 (age 27)	Member of RIEHATA's Rht. dance crew and ROYAL BRATS. Choreographer for Class:y. Back-up dancer for CL and Zico
Wolf'Lo	Halo (할로)	November 5, 1988 (age 38)	Member of Navy Melting Slide (NMS) and 9ueenz crews, and project team TEAM MADBLACK. Previously participated in the first season of Street Woman Fighter, took part at HolyBang's mega crew mission.
Wolf'Lo	Mini (미니)	September 1, 1989 (age 37)	Member of 9ueenz crew. Previously participated in the first season of Street Woman Fighter, took part at Want's mega crew mission.
Wolf'Lo	Baby Sleek (베이비슬릭)	February 8, 1983 (age 43)	Member of Uptown Family and 9ueenz crew. Had won many dance competitions from 2001–onwards.
Wolf'Lo	Chocol (초콜)	September 12, 1987 (age 39)	Member of Navy Melting Slide (NMS) crew, 9ueenz crew, and AMillionRockface (AMR) crew. Previously participated in the first season of Street Woman Fighter, took part at HolyBang's mega crew mission.
Wolf'Lo	Yeni Cho (예니초)	March 21, 1992 (age 34)	Member of AMillionRockface (AMR) crew. Previously participated in the first season of Street Woman Fighter, took part at HolyBang's mega crew mission.
Wolf'Lo	Haechi Wang (해치왱)	December 9, 1995 (age 30)	Member of AMillionRockface (AMR) crew. Previously participated in the first season of Street Woman Fighter, took part at HolyBang's mega crew mission.

== Missions ==
=== Mission 1: "No Respect, Battle of the Weakest" ===
Each dancer points out a dancer from an opposing team that they can beat in a one-on-one dance battle. The chosen dancer is given a "No Respect" sticker for each time they are chosen.

Rules for the dance battles
- The named dancer points out a dancer they consider to be the weakest, and engages in a one-on-one dance battle for 40 seconds each.
- The named dancer goes first while the pointed out dancer goes second.
- At the end of the battle, the Fight Judges will determine the winner.
- Fight Judges can request a rematch when no winner can be decided. A rematch will take place if two or more judges cannot decide a winner or in the case of a 1:1 tie and the third judge cannot choose a winner. In the rematch, both dancers dance at the same time for 40 seconds.
- The winning dancer gives a NO RESPECT sticker of their respective crew color to the losing team, which is stuck on their crew fist.
- The team with the most losses are labeled as the NO RESPECT Crew.

Round two consists of two-on-two battles. Round three consists of five-on-five crew battles. A special round, "Ace Battle", was introduced. In Ace Battle, each team chose one Ace member. A random Ace member is chosen as an opponent and the other Ace members have 100 seconds to choose to battle them. If more than one Ace member challenges the chosen Ace member, one of them would be chosen at random. The rules are the same for all the rounds, but rematches consist of one-on-one battles and points for victories and defeats are doubled in Ace Battles.

"No Respect" stickers
Crew	Name	No. of stickers	Total
**Bebe**	Bada (바다)	2	2 stickers
**1Million**	Lia Kim (리아킴)	3	8 stickers
**1Million**	Amy (에이미)	1	8 stickers
**1Million**	Redy (레디)	1	8 stickers
**1Million**	Harimu (하리무)	1	8 stickers
**1Million**	Dohee (도희)	1	8 stickers
**1Million**	Debby (데비)	1	8 stickers
**Deep N Dap**	Mina Myoung (미나명)	2	5 stickers
**Deep N Dap**	Minny Park (미니팍)	2	5 stickers
**Deep N Dap**	Gooseul (구슬)	1	5 stickers
**Jam Republic**	Kirsten (거스틴)	2	10 stickers
**Jam Republic**	Ling (링)	1	10 stickers
**Jam Republic**	Emma (엠마)	1	10 stickers
**Jam Republic**	Audrey (오드리)	6	10 stickers
**Lady Bounce**	Nob (놉)	3	5 stickers
**Lady Bounce**	Biggy (비기)	1	5 stickers
**Lady Bounce**	Capri (카프리)	1	5 stickers
**Mannequeen**	Funky Y (펑기와이)	2	7 stickers
**Mannequeen**	Redlic (레드릭)	2	7 stickers
**Mannequeen**	Buckey (벅키)	1	7 stickers
**Mannequeen**	Cera (쎄라)	1	7 stickers
**Mannequeen**	Waaackxxxy (왁씨)	1	7 stickers
**Tsubakill**	Akanen(아카넨)	2	4 stickers
**Tsubakill**	Sayaka (사야카)	1	4 stickers
**Tsubakill**	Momo (모모)	1	4 stickers
**Wolf'Lo**	Halo (할로)	1	6 stickers
**Wolf'Lo**	Baby Sleek (베이비슬릭)	2	6 stickers
**Wolf'Lo**	Yeni Cho (예니초)	2	6 stickers
**Wolf'Lo**	Chocol (초콜)	1	6 stickers
Total			**47 stickers**

No Respect, Battle of the Weakest battles from ep. 1–2 & Special
Round	Team	Contestant	Votes
1	Bebe	Bada	3
1	1Million	Redy	0
2 (Note: Tied at first battle)	Jam Republic	Kirsten	2
2	Mannequeen	Waaackxxxy	1
3	Mannequeen	Yoonji	3
3	Jam Republic	Kirsten	0
4	1Million	Harimu	2
4	Mannequeen	Redlic	1
5	1Million	Redy	Unrevealed
5	Deep N Dap	JJ	Unrevealed
6	1Million	Lia Kim	Unrevealed
6	Deep N Dap	Gooseul	Unrevealed
7	Jam Republic	Audrey	2
7	LadyBounce	Vessi	1
8	Jam Republic	Audrey	3
8	Deep N Dap	Soll	1
9 (Note: Monika abstained from voting.)	1Million	Lia Kim	0
9	Deep N Dap	Mina Myoung	2
10	Wolf'Lo	Mini	3
10	Tsubakill	Akanen	0
11	Jam Republic	Ling	0
11	Mannequeen	Cera	3
12	Wolf'Lo	Baby Sleek	2
12	1Million	Amy	1
13	Jam Republic	Kirsten	1
13	Mannequeen	Waaackxxxy	3
14	1Million	Crew	0
14	LadyBounce	Crew	3
15	Mannequeen	Waaackxxxy; Yoonji	3
15	Tsubakill	Momo; Yumeri	0
16	Bebe	Crew	3
16	Deep N Dap	Crew	0
17	Jam Republic	Latrice; Kirsten	2
17	LadyBounce	Nob; Biggy	0
18	Mannequeen	Crew	1
18	Wolf'Lo	Crew	2

Unaired battles
Round	Team	Contestant	Votes
1	**Wolf'Lo**	Halo	3
1	**LadyBounce**	Nob	0
2	**Wolf'Lo**	Baby Sleek	Unrevealed
2	**Mannequeen**	Buckey	Unrevealed
3	**Tsubakill**	Crew	1
3	**Jam Republic**	Crew	2
4	**Jam Republic**	Emma	Unrevealed, won
4	**LadyBounce**	Capri	Unrevealed, lost
5	**Wolf'Lo**	Yeni Cho	Unrevealed (Lost)
5	**Mannequeen**	Funky Y	Unrevealed (Won)
6	**Wolf'Lo**	Chocol	Unrevealed
6	**Tsubakill**	Sayaka	Unrevealed
7	**1Million**	Amy	Unrevealed
7	**Deep N Dap**	Mina Myoung	Unrevealed
8	**Wolf'Lo**	Baby Sleek	Unrevealed
8	**1Million**	Lia Kim	Unrevealed
9	**Bebe**	Bada	Unrevealed
9	**Mannequeen**	Redlic	Unrevealed
10	**Bebe**	Tatter	Unrevealed
10	**Wolf'Lo**	Yeni Cho	Unrevealed
11	**Tsubakill**	Yumeri	Unrevealed
11	**Jam Republic**	Audrey	Unrevealed
12	**Jam Republic**	Latrice	Unrevealed
12	**Tsubakill**	Momo	Unrevealed
13	**1Million**	Lia Kim	Unrevealed
13	**Wolf'Lo**	Halo	Unrevealed
14	**Wolf'Lo**	Halo; Chocol	Unrevealed
14	?	?	Unrevealed

"Ace Battle" Aces
Crew	Ace
Wolf'Lo	Baby Sleek
Mannequeen	Waaackxxxy
Bebe	Kyma
Jam Republic	Kirsten
Deep N Dap	Locker Zee
Tsubakill	Rena
1Million	Amy
LadyBounce	Vessi

Ace Battle
Round	Team	Contestant	Votes
1	Wolf'Lo	Baby Sleek	2
1	1Million	Amy	1
2	Mannequeen	Waaackxxxy	3
2	Jam Republic	Kirsten	1
3	Deep N Dap	Locker Zee	Unrevealed, won
3	LadyBounce	Vessi	Unrevealed, lost
4	Bebe	Kyma	3
4	1Million	Amy	0
5	Mannequeen	Waaackxxxy	Unrevealed
5	No one want to challenge		
6	Wolf'Lo	Baby Sleek	3
6	Tsubakill	Rena	0

Ranking
Rank	Crew	Wins	Losses
1	Wolf'Lo	12	1
2	Mannequeen	8	5
3	Bebe	6	1
4	Jam Republic	6	6
5	Deep N Dap	5	6
6	Tsubakill	4	6
7	1Million	4	11
8	LadyBounce	1	8

=== Mission 2: "Class" ===
Each crew leader chooses five members, (Note: 5 is the max number of members that can be sent. As a result, 1Million's Dohee, Bebe's Minah and Sowoen, Deep N Dap's Soll and LockerZee, Mannequeen's Cera, Tsubakill's Miki, and Wolf'Lo's Baby Sleek did not participate in this round.) including themselves, to be split into four ranks. Each rank works together to create a dance video. Each rank only has one main dancer, who would be chosen by the judges. The rest would be back-up dancers in the video. Each dancer in a rank will create a short choreography that would be voted on by the members of their rank. The chosen choreography would be the one used to determine the main dancer.

Main dancer's benefits
- In charge of the center position, choreography, and directing the video for their rank.
- Receive 100 points for their crew.
- Will choose the "worst dancer" in their rank and they will battle it out to which of their teams will receive the "worst dancer" points.

Unlike previous seasons, individual scores were given out. The Fight Judges ranked the dancers of each class from 1st to 8th and the scores were based on those rankings. The Fight Judges will also choose the winner of the worst dancer battles similar to the "no respect" battles.

Color key:

- Main dancer(s)
- Worst dancer
- **Bold** denotes chosen choreographer

Class mission
Class	Team	Contestant	Song selection
Leader Class	1Million	Lia Kim	"Smoke" by Dynamic Duo, Lee Young-ji
Leader Class	Bebe	**Bada**	"Smoke" by Dynamic Duo, Lee Young-ji
Leader Class	Deep N Dap	Mina Myoung	"Smoke" by Dynamic Duo, Lee Young-ji
Leader Class	Jam Republic	Kirsten	"Smoke" by Dynamic Duo, Lee Young-ji
Leader Class	LadyBounce	Nob	"Smoke" by Dynamic Duo, Lee Young-ji
Leader Class	Mannequeen	Funky Y	"Smoke" by Dynamic Duo, Lee Young-ji
Leader Class	Tsubakill	Akanen	"Smoke" by Dynamic Duo, Lee Young-ji
Leader Class	Wolf'Lo	Halo	"Smoke" by Dynamic Duo, Lee Young-ji
Sub-leader Class	1Million	Harimu	"Click Like" by Crush featuring Paul Blanco
Sub-leader Class	Bebe	Lusher	"Click Like" by Crush featuring Paul Blanco
Sub-leader Class	Deep N Dap	Downy	"Click Like" by Crush featuring Paul Blanco
Sub-leader Class	Jam Republic	**Latrice**	"Click Like" by Crush featuring Paul Blanco
Sub-leader Class	LadyBounce	Biggy	"Click Like" by Crush featuring Paul Blanco
Sub-leader Class	Mannequeen	Redlic	"Click Like" by Crush featuring Paul Blanco
Sub-leader Class	Tsubakill	Sayaka	"Click Like" by Crush featuring Paul Blanco
Sub-leader Class	Wolf'Lo	Mini	"Click Like" by Crush featuring Paul Blanco
Middle Class	1Million	Amy and Debby	"Swipe" by Taeyong, Ten (NCT)
Middle Class	Bebe	Kyma and Cheche	"Swipe" by Taeyong, Ten (NCT)
Middle Class	Deep N Dap	Minny and JJ	"Swipe" by Taeyong, Ten (NCT)
Middle Class	Jam Republic	Ling and Audrey	"Swipe" by Taeyong, Ten (NCT)
Middle Class	LadyBounce	Vessi and Naro	"Swipe" by Taeyong, Ten (NCT)
Middle Class	Mannequeen	**Waaackxxxy and Yoonji**	"Swipe" by Taeyong, Ten (NCT)
Middle Class	Tsubakill	Momo and Yumeri	"Swipe" by Taeyong, Ten (NCT)
Middle Class	Wolf'Lo	Chocol and Haechi Wang	"Swipe" by Taeyong, Ten (NCT)
Rookie Class	1Million	Redy	"How to Twerk" by Miyeon, Yuqi ((G)I-dle)
Rookie Class	Bebe	Tatter	"How to Twerk" by Miyeon, Yuqi ((G)I-dle)
Rookie Class	Deep N Dap	Gooseul	"How to Twerk" by Miyeon, Yuqi ((G)I-dle)
Rookie Class	Jam Republic	Emma	"How to Twerk" by Miyeon, Yuqi ((G)I-dle)
Rookie Class	LadyBounce	**Capri**	"How to Twerk" by Miyeon, Yuqi ((G)I-dle)
Rookie Class	Mannequeen	Buckey	"How to Twerk" by Miyeon, Yuqi ((G)I-dle)
Rookie Class	Tsubakill	Rena	"How to Twerk" by Miyeon, Yuqi ((G)I-dle)
Rookie Class	Wolf'Lo	Yeni Cho	"How to Twerk" by Miyeon, Yuqi ((G)I-dle)

Color key:

- Winner

"Worst Dancer" battle
Round	Team	Contestant	Votes
Leader	Bebe	Bada	3
Leader	Deep N Dap	Mina Myoung	0
Sub-Leader	Jam Republic	Latrice	2 (Note: Monika scored a tie for both contestants)
Sub-Leader	Mannequeen	Redlic	0
Middle	Mannequeen	Waaackxxxy, Yoonji	3
Middle	Bebe	Kyma, Cheche	0
Rookie	Tsubakill	Rena	3
Rookie	Mannequeen	Buckey	0

Ranking
Rank	Crew	Scores						
Rank	Crew	Leader Class	Sub-leader Class	Middle Class	Rookie Class	Main Dancer	Worst Dancer	Total
1	Jam Republic	270	300	290	150	+100	–	1110
2	Tsubakill	230	260	90	290	+100	–	970
3	Bebe	300	220	90	230	+100	−50	890
4	LadyBounce	190	180	140	280	–	–	790
5	Mannequeen	110	250	280	140	+100	−100	780
6	1Million	210	180	140	190	–	–	720
7	Deep N Dap	110	200	90	190	–	−50	540
8	Wolf'Lo	140	90	90	90	–	–	410

=== Mission 3: "K-Pop Death Match" ===
Two crews compete using the same songs from one of the four main Korean entertainment companies: SM, JYP, YG, and HYBE. Each crew chooses which entertainment company they want to dance to and if three or more crews choose the same entertainment company, they will each choreograph a 30-second section of the selected songs, which will be judged and voted on by the non-competing crews. The two crews with the fewest votes will compete against each other for this round, while the losing crew will need to choose another available entertainment company, with the crew receiving the fewest votes getting to choose first. Each crew must also complete the Choreography Copy Challenge.

Choreography Copy Challenge
- There are two copy challenge sections in each song
- Of the two sections, each crew must take one section and create the choreography that the other team must "copy" and incorporate into their choreography
- If both crews want the same sections, they must discuss it among themselves

As part of the scoring, crews will perform their choreography in front of an audience, and the audience will choose the better choreography. The performance order will be determined by each entertainment company's performance director or artist representatives.

Color key:

- Loser

Entertainment Company crew battle
Round	Team	Votes
HYBE	Jam Republic	4
HYBE	Mannequeen	2
HYBE	Deep N Dap	24
JYP	1Million	26
JYP	Tsubakill	0
JYP	Bebe	3

The crew with the higher score for each battle wins and avoids elimination, while the losing crew is nominated for elimination. Final scores are calculated as the sum of the Fight Judges' Score + Audience Score + Global Popular Vote Score + Class Mission Score.

Scoring system
- Fight Judges' score: Total of 150 points split between both crews.
- Audience Score: 50 points to the crew with the most votes from the live audience.
- Global Popular Vote score: Voting period from June 23 to 26, 2023, at 12:00 PM KST. (Note: Videos were posted on YouTube by Mnet on The Choom channel on June 23) Score calculated as Views + Likes X 100 + Mnet Plus Votes X 100.
- Class Mission score: 200 points for first place, then deducting 10 points for each lower rank.

Color key:

- Winner

"K-pop Death Match" mission
Crew	Song selection	Scores				
Crew	Song selection	Fight judges	Audience vote	Public vote	Previous mission	Total
Deep N Dap	"Next Level" by Aespa + "Kick It" by NCT 127	0	0	350	140	490
LadyBounce	"Next Level" by Aespa + "Kick It" by NCT 127	150	50	450	170	820
Tsubakill	"Not Shy" by Itzy + "Maniac" by Stray Kids	0	0	250	190	440
Bebe	"Not Shy" by Itzy + "Maniac" by Stray Kids	150	50	600	180	980
Wolf'Lo	"Shut Down" by Blackpink + "Coup d'Etat" by G-Dragon	50	0	300	130	480
1Million	"Shut Down" by Blackpink + "Coup d'Etat" by G-Dragon	100	50	550	150	850
Jam Republic	"Eve, Psyche & the Bluebeard's Wife" by Le Sserafim + "Dope" by BTS	150	0	400	200	750
Mannequeen	"Eve, Psyche & the Bluebeard's Wife" by Le Sserafim + "Dope" by BTS	0	50	500	160	710

The losing crews – Deep N Dap, Mannequeen, Wolf'Lo, and Tsubakill – were chosen as candidates for elimination. The two crews that placed in 7th and 8th rank, which were Wolf'Lo and Tsubakill, were automatically placed in the elimination battle.

Rules of the elimination battle
- Best of 5:
  - Round 1 – Crew
  - Round 2 – Ace
  - Round 3 – Leader
  - Round 4 – Duet
  - Round 5 – Hidden
- At the end of each round, the Fight Judges determine the winner.
- The first crew to win three rounds is safe from elimination, while the losing crew is eliminated.

First elimination battle
Round	Contestant		Winning team
Round	Wolf'Lo	Tsubakill	Winning team
1	Crew	Crew	**Tsubakill**
2	Baby Sleek	Yumeri	**Wolf'Lo**
3	Halo	Akanen	**Tsubakill**
4	Baby Sleek and Mini	Akanen and Momo	**Wolf'Lo**
5	Crew	Crew	**Wolf'Lo**

=== Mission 4: "Mega Crew" ===
The remaining crews competed in a Mega Crew mission where each crew selects a theme on which to base their own choreography and perform it with a minimum of 30 performers including themselves. The two crews that selected the same theme compete against each other with the winner receiving extra points. Crews personally recruited their mega crew performers. Each crew has 3 directors, of which one of the 3 was the crew's leader. (Note: General director is the leader while the other two are members.)

Final scores were calculated as the sum of the Fight Judges' Score + Public Vote Score.

Scoring system
- Fight Judges' Score: Each judge awards up to 400 points to each three directors of each crew totaling up to 1200 points.
- Global Popular Vote Score: Voting period from September 12, 2023, at 12:30 AM KST to September 19, 2023, at 6:00 PM KST. (Note: Videos were posted on YouTube by Mnet on The Choom channel on September 12.) Score calculated as Views + Likes X 100. Crews are ranked from this score and awarded points starting at 500 points for the highest score.
- The winning crew on each theme match-up will receive an extra 100 points.
- If a crew does not meet the minimum number of crew members on their team (including the participants), the leader of the crew will get 100 points deduction from the Fight Judges' Score.

Color key:

- Winner

"Mega Crew" mission
Theme	Crew		Song Selection	Directors	Score Breakdown					Final scores	Rank
Theme	Crew	Crew Size	Song Selection	Directors	Fight Judges Scores				Public Vote	Final scores	Rank
Theme	Crew	Crew Size	Song Selection	Directors	Fight judges	Extra Points	Total	Points	Public Vote	Final scores	Rank
Outdoor	Deep N Dap	52 (Note: Including Viviz's SinB and Want's Hyojin Choi)	"No One" by Lee Hi featuring B.I of iKon + Court Musicians from the Jeon Woo-chi: The Taoist Wizard	Mina Myoung	356	–	1,076	200	300	500	**6th** (Tie)
Outdoor	Deep N Dap	52	"No One" by Lee Hi featuring B.I of iKon + Court Musicians from the Jeon Woo-chi: The Taoist Wizard	Downy	352	–	1,076	200	300	500	**6th** (Tie)
Outdoor	Deep N Dap	52	"No One" by Lee Hi featuring B.I of iKon + Court Musicians from the Jeon Woo-chi: The Taoist Wizard	JJ	368	–	1,076	200	300	500	**6th** (Tie)
Outdoor	Jam Republic	26 (Note: Members of Royal Family dance crew were originally invited as crew members but were unable to participate due to scheduling conflicts from another dance competition occurring at that time.)	"Pass That Dutch" by Missy Elliott + "Ante Up" by M.O.P + "Jele" by Busiswa, DBN Gogo, Sino Msolo, Kamo Mphela, Young Stunna + "Too Much" by Pedro, Magugu	Kirsten	282 (Note: Originally received a score of 382 from the Fight Judges but was deducted 100 points after Jam Republic did not meet the minimum number of crew members for the Mega Crew mission)	100	1,117	400	450	850	**2nd**
Outdoor	Jam Republic	26	"Pass That Dutch" by Missy Elliott + "Ante Up" by M.O.P + "Jele" by Busiswa, DBN Gogo, Sino Msolo, Kamo Mphela, Young Stunna + "Too Much" by Pedro, Magugu	Latrice	374	100	1,117	400	450	850	**2nd**
Outdoor	Jam Republic	26	"Pass That Dutch" by Missy Elliott + "Ante Up" by M.O.P + "Jele" by Busiswa, DBN Gogo, Sino Msolo, Kamo Mphela, Young Stunna + "Too Much" by Pedro, Magugu	Emma	361	100	1,117	400	450	850	**2nd**
Structure	Mannequeen	68 (Note: Including Prowdmon's Lip J, Aespa's Winter, and Spella)	"A La Turca" by David Garrett + "Kairos" by Derek Hough featuring Lindsey Stirling + "What's Up Danger (Instrumental)" by Blackway, Black Caviar	Funky Y	360	–	1,100	350	350	700	**3rd** (Tie)
Structure	Mannequeen	68	"A La Turca" by David Garrett + "Kairos" by Derek Hough featuring Lindsey Stirling + "What's Up Danger (Instrumental)" by Blackway, Black Caviar	Redlic	375	–	1,100	350	350	700	**3rd** (Tie)
Structure	Mannequeen	68	"A La Turca" by David Garrett + "Kairos" by Derek Hough featuring Lindsey Stirling + "What's Up Danger (Instrumental)" by Blackway, Black Caviar	Yoonji	365	–	1,100	350	350	700	**3rd** (Tie)
Structure	1Million	100 (Note: Including Sandara Park, YGX and now 1Million choreographer Yell, and Amazon (Saerim, Eunhye, Injeong, Hyeyeon, Noh Won))	"YO-SOUL + Yellow" by Lim Kim	Lia Kim	392	100	1,265	500	500	1,000	**1st**
Structure	1Million	100	"YO-SOUL + Yellow" by Lim Kim	Amy	388	100	1,265	500	500	1,000	**1st**
Structure	1Million	100	"YO-SOUL + Yellow" by Lim Kim	Harimu	385	100	1,265	500	500	1,000	**1st**
All Gender	Bebe	30 (Note: Including WeDemBoyz (Ingyoo, Insun, Kyungnam, Dophan, Youngbin, Ahob, Daehan Yoon, Noan, Hojun, Jimmy))	"Psycho" by Baekhyun	Bada	360	–	1,087	250	400	650	**5th**
All Gender	Bebe	30	"Psycho" by Baekhyun	Lusher	360	–	1,087	250	400	650	**5th**
All Gender	Bebe	30	"Psycho" by Baekhyun	Tatter	367	–	1,087	250	400	650	**5th**
All Gender	LadyBounce	51 (Note: Including Break Ambition (Beast, Comet, Jerk, Leg), Code, Inmountboy, and Tutat)	"Immigrant Song" by Led Zeppelin + "Welcome to the Party" by Diplo, French Montana, Lil Pump featuring Zhavia Ward	Nob	368	100	1,215	450	250	700	**3rd** (Tie)
All Gender	LadyBounce	51	"Immigrant Song" by Led Zeppelin + "Welcome to the Party" by Diplo, French Montana, Lil Pump featuring Zhavia Ward	Biggy	370	100	1,215	450	250	700	**3rd** (Tie)
All Gender	LadyBounce	51	"Immigrant Song" by Led Zeppelin + "Welcome to the Party" by Diplo, French Montana, Lil Pump featuring Zhavia Ward	Vessi	377	100	1,215	450	250	700	**3rd** (Tie)
All Gender	Wolf'Lo	61 (Note: Including Reverse Crew (Shinobi, Gawblin, Jotee, C4) and Drop)	"Tea Leaf Dancers" by Flying Lotus featuring Andreya Triana + "Island Phobia" by QM featuring Tiger JK + "Say Peace" by Common, PJ featuring Black Thought	Halo	346	–	1,088	300	200	500	**6th** (Tie)
All Gender	Wolf'Lo	61	"Tea Leaf Dancers" by Flying Lotus featuring Andreya Triana + "Island Phobia" by QM featuring Tiger JK + "Say Peace" by Common, PJ featuring Black Thought	Baby Sleek	375	–	1,088	300	200	500	**6th** (Tie)
All Gender	Wolf'Lo	61	"Tea Leaf Dancers" by Flying Lotus featuring Andreya Triana + "Island Phobia" by QM featuring Tiger JK + "Say Peace" by Common, PJ featuring Black Thought	Chocol	367	–	1,088	300	200	500	**6th** (Tie)

At the end of the Mega Crew mission, the two crews with the lowest total points competed in the second elimination battle.

Rules of the second elimination battle
- Best of 7:
  - Round 1 – Hidden
  - Round 2 – 1v1 (winner of last round will choose their representative first)
  - Round 3 – 1v1 (winner of last round will choose their representative first)
  - Round 4 – 5v5
  - Round 5 – Ace
  - Round 6 – 2v2
  - Round 7 – Leader
- At the end of each round, the Fight Judges determine the winner.
- The first crew to win four rounds will advance to the next round, while the losing crew is eliminated.

Second elimination battle
Round	Contestant		Winning team
Round	Wolf'Lo	Deep N Dap	Winning team
1	Crew	Crew	Deep N Dap
2	Chocol	LockerZee	Wolf'Lo
3	Mini	JJ	Wolf'Lo
4	Crew (Note: Except Mini)	Crew (Note: Except LockerZee and Soll)	Deep N Dap
5	Baby Sleek	LockerZee (Note: Soll was originally assigned for this battle but unable to compete after Round 1 due to her persisting neck injury.)	Wolf'Lo
6	Yeni Cho & Haechi Wang	LockerZee & JJ	Deep N Dap
7	Halo	Mina Myoung	Wolf'Lo

=== Mission 5: "Hwasa Choreography Mission" ===
Each crew created a new choreography for Hwasa's new single "Chili". Points distribution was based on online voting (up to 400 points) plus additional points for the crew with the most views. Additionally, the crew whose choreography was chosen by Hwasa would have the benefit of directing the music video, and the crew whose choreography video receives the most likes would receive 100 extra points. 1Million's choreography was chosen and the crew directed the "Chili" music video.

Scoring system
- Global Popular Vote Score: 250-400 points possible. The crew with the most views received a total of 400 points, while 2nd to 6th place crews had 30 points deducted per rank. The voting period was from October 3 to October 10, 2023, at 12:00 AM KST. Voting was based on the number of YouTube likes and 'Mnet Plus' voting. Views due to video campaign promotion and various abuse were not included in the count. Voting within the 'Mnet Plus' app could only be done once a day. Multiple voting is possible, but duplicate voting is not possible. (One could vote again at 12:00 AM KST)
- Hwasa's pick: The crew which choreography was selected received an additional 100 points.
- Additional points for the Chili Challenge: the crew with the most of social media challenges received an additional 100 points.
- Total possible points for this mission was 600 points.

"Hwasa Choreography Mission"
Crew	Main Dancer	Scores			
Crew	Main Dancer	Global Popular vote	Hwasa's chosen choreography	Extra points for Chili Challenge	Total Score
Bebe	Bada	370	–	100	470
1Million	Harimu	340	100	–	440
Jam Republic	Kirsten	400	–	–	400
Wolf'Lo	Mini	310	–	–	310
LadyBounce	Nob	280	–	–	280
Mannequeen	Redlic	250	–	–	250

=== Mission 6: "Battle Performance Mission" ===
The remaining 6 crews were paired against each other to compete in this round. Each crew prepared a dance performance where they picked the first song while the second song was from the opposing crew's performance preview song. The winning crew received additional points in this round.

Final scores were calculated as the sum of the Fight Judges' Score + Global Popular Vote Score + Audience Vote Score + Cumulative points from Hwasa's Choreography Mission.

Scoring system
- Fight Judges' Score: Each judge gave 10 points to the crew they selected to win on each match-up (Up to 30 points possible).
- Audience Votes: The crew with the higher vote count from the audience on each match-up received 70 points.
- Global Popular Vote Score: Up to 500 points possible. 1st place received 500 points, while 2th to 6th place crews had 30 points deducted per rank. The voting period was from October 10–13, 2023, at 12:00 AM KST. The global rating score was calculated as the sum of likes X 100 and views of the evaluation video posted on YouTube's The CHOOM channel, and Mnet Plus vote X 100. Views due to video campaign promotion and various abuse were not included in the count. Voting within the 'Mnet Plus' app could only be done once a day. Multiple voting was possible, but duplicate voting was not possible. (You can vote again at 12:00 AM KST)
- Total possible points for this mission was 1200 points (cumulative scores for the Battle Performance + Hwasa Choreography Mission was included).

"Battle Performance" mission
Match	Crew	Song Selection			Scores			Total Score	Rank
Match	Crew	Free Style	1:1 Battle	Crew Song Performance	Fight judges	Audience vote	Global Popular vote	Total Score	Rank
R1	Bebe	"Cool Off" by Missy Elliott	"Fire" by Seventeen–Hip Hop Unit (Note: Performed by Bada)	"Crimson" by Bewhy	30	70 (Note: with 483 audience votes)	470	570	1st
R1	Wolf'Lo	Move, Shake, Drop by Flo Rida, Pitbull	"Mijangwon" (feat. Loopy & Nafla) by Dumbfoundead (Note: Performed by Halo)	"Chemistry" by Hyolyn	0	0 (Note: with 340 audience votes.)	350	350	6th
R2	LadyBounce	Intro ("Pass that Dutch" by Missy Elliott + "More Layers of Mayhem" by Psyk	"Armadillo" (feat. Omega Sapien & Byung Un) By Balming Tiger (Note: Performed by Biggie)	"Crazy Out There" by Kid Milli, SUMIN	10 (Note: Trix voted for Lady Bounce.)	70 (Note: with 460 audience votes.)	380	460	5th
R2	Jam Republic	"Angels in Tibet" by Amaarae (Note: Performed by Kirsten & Latrice)	"Who Dat Boy" (feat. A$AP Rocky) By Tyler, the Creator (Note: Performed by Audrey)	"Baby Back Home" by Mirani, Leellamarz	20 (Note: Monika and Honey J voted for Jam Republic)	0 (Note: with 364 audience votes.)	500	520	2nd
R3	Mannequeen	"A Little Party Never Killed Nobody (All We Got)" by Fergie, Q-Tip, GoonRock	"Abracadabra" By Brown Eyed Girls (Note: Performed by Cera)	"Naked Gold" by Jamie	30	0 (Note: with 398 audience votes.)	440	470	4th
R3	1Million	"SexyBack" by Justin Timberlake	"The Time (Dirty Bit)" by Black Eyed Peas (Note: Performed by Lia Kim)	"EZ" by Jvcki Wai	0	70 (Note: with 423 audience votes)	410	480	3rd

Rank	Crew	Score Breakdown		Total Score (1,200)
Rank	Crew	"Hwasa Choreography" Mission (600)	"Battle Performance" Mission (600)	Total Score (1,200)
1st	Bebe	470	570	1,040
2nd	Jam Republic	400	520	920
2nd	1Million	440	480	920
4th	LadyBounce	280	460	740
5th	Mannequeen	250	470	720
6th	Wolf'Lo	310	350	660

As the lowest scoring crew, Wolf'Lo was automatically eliminated. In contrast, as the 5th place team, Mannequeen, was automatically placed in the elimination battle. The crew that ranked 1st, Bebe, was given the ability to choose Mannequeen's opponent out of the remaining 3 crews. LadyBounce was chosen as the second candidate for elimination.

Rules of the elimination battle
- Best of 7:
  - Round 1 – Hidden
  - Round 2 – 1v1 (winner of last round will choose their representative first)
  - Round 3 – Secret Round (3v3 Relay Dance Battle; the crew will randomly select 3 members to compete depending on what music the DJ will play.)
  - Round 4 – 5v5
  - Round 5 (Note: If Necessary) – 1v1 (winner of last round will choose their representative first)
  - Round 6 (Note: If Necessary) – 2v2 (winner of last round will choose their representative first)
  - Round 7 (Note: If Necessary) – Leader
- At the end of each round, the Fight Judges determine the winner.
- The first crew to win four rounds is safe from elimination, while the losing crew is eliminated.

Semi-final elimination battle
Round	Contestant		Winning team
Round	Lady Bounce	Mannequeen	Winning team
**1**	Crew	Crew	**Mannequeen**
**2**	Vessi	Yoonji	**Mannequeen**
**3**	Vessi, Biggy, Nob	Cera, Waaackxxxy, Yoonji	**Mannequeen**
**4**	Crew	Crew (Note: Except Redlic)	**LadyBounce**
**5**	Biggy	Waaackxxxy	**Mannequeen**

=== Mission 7: "Global Artist Mission" ===
Each crew created a choreography from the following artists: Rihanna, Beyoncé, Lady Gaga, and Ariana Grande. Prior to the live episode, each team selected an artist's song they would like to perform with. In the event that more than one team selects the same artist, all contestants each voted for the team whose artist would best suit their performance. The remaining teams not chosen made a 2nd artist selection for their performance.

Scoring system
- Live Broadcast Vote Score (80%): The crew with the highest score received 800 points, then 2nd to 4th place crews had 30 points deducted per rank. Voting was done via SMS (limited within South Korea only). Voting for multiple crews was allowed. No duplicate voting for the same crew was allowed.
- Crew Performance Vote (20%): The crew with the highest score received 200 points, then 2nd to 4th place crews had 10 points deducted per rank.
- The team with the most total cumulative score from both Ending Credit and Global Artist missions was declared the show's winner.

Color key:

- Team with the most votes gets to perform Beyonce's choreography

Global artist choreography selection (Note: All four crews selected and performed Beyonce's song. As a result, the contestants will each make an individual vote to determine which team will do Beyonce's choreography.)
Team	Votes	Initial Artist Pick	Final Artist
**Jam Republic**	14	Beyoncé	
**Bebe**	8	Beyoncé	Rihanna
**Mannequeen**	2	Beyoncé	Lady Gaga
**1Million**	0	Beyoncé	Ariana Grande

"Global Artist" mission
Crew	Song selection
**1Million**	"7 Rings" + "Bang Bang" by Ariana Grande
**Bebe**	"Cockiness (Love It)" + "S&M" by Rihanna
**Jam Republic**	"Flawless" + "Baby Boy (Homecoming Live Performance Version)" + "Bow Down" (Homecoming Live Performance Version) by Beyoncé
**Mannequeen**	"Poker Face" + "Scheiße" + "Judas" by Lady Gaga

=== Mission 8: "Ending Credit" ===
The finalists each portrayed and showcased the best concept, color, identity, and characteristics of their team. This mission tried to prove each crew's uniqueness and world-class expertise as they put their all into this final performance.

Scoring system
- Live Broadcast Vote Score (80%): The crew with the highest score received 800 points, then 2nd to 4th place crews were deducted 50 points per rank. Voting was done via SMS (limited within South Korea only). Voting for multiple crews was allowed. No duplicate voting for the same crew was allowed.
- Crew Performance Vote (20%): The crew with the highest score received 200 points, then 2nd to 4th place crews were deducted 10 points per rank.
- The team with the most total cumulative score from both Ending Credit and Global Artist missions were declared the show's winner.

"Ending credit" mission
Crew	Song selection
**1Million** (Note: Meaning: Their determination to focus on the present and its true colors to overcome the prejudices)	"Natural" by Imagine Dragons
**Bebe** (Note: Meaning: Only the prepared may escape from darkness. BEBE portrays its perseverance to keep on dancing.)	"Praise" by Kanye West + Self-produced song by Bebe (Prod. Minseo of JustJerk) + "Run It" by DJ Snake
**Jam Republic** (Note: Meaning: The highlights of their identity as a diverse troupe unified to achieve success and show how will, toughness, and tenacity overcame adversity.)	"Jele" by Busiswa, DBN Gogo, Sino Msolo, Kamo Mphela, Young Stunna
**Mannequeen** (Note: Meaning: This was seen as a fresh start for the girls, as they left a message and directive full of self-empowerment and inner beauty.)	"Express" + "The Beautiful People" + "Show Me How You Burlesque" (from Burlesque movie OST) by Christina Aguilera

Combined Finals Results (Global Artist and Ending Credit Missions)
Rank	Crew	Scores		
Rank	Crew	Live Broadcast Vote	Crew Performance Vote	Final Score
1	**Bebe**	800 (Note: with 75,357 live votes)	190	990
2	**Jam Republic**	750 (Note: with 62,034 live votes)	200	950
3	**1Million**	700 (Note: with 61,565 live votes)	180	880
4	**Mannequeen**	650 (Note: with 60,727 live votes)	170	820

Indicates winner of Street Woman Fighter 2
Indicates the 2nd place crew
Indicates the 3rd place and 4th place crews

== Final ranking ==
Crews' final rankings
Rank	Crew	Notes
1st place, gold medalist(s)	Bebe	Winner
2	Jam Republic	Runner-up
3	1 Million	3rd place
4	Mannequeen	4th place
5	LadyBounce	Eliminated in Episode 9
6	Wolf'Lo	Eliminated in Episode 9
7	Deep N Dap	Eliminated in Episode 6
8	Tsubakill	Eliminated in Episode 4

== Original soundtrack ==
=== Part 1 ===
Released on August 22, 2023
No.	Title	Lyrics	Music	Artist	Length
1.	"Naked Gold" (produced by Czaer)	riskypizza; JADEJ; jxxdxn	Czaer; riskypizza	Jamie	3:00
2.	"Chemistry" (produced by Czaer)	Czaer; riskypizza	Czaer; riskypizza; thesecret; Advanced; RYS	Hyolyn	2:59
3.	"Walk" (걸; produced by Czaer)	Giriboy; Yunhway	Czaer; Haechi; Giriboy; Yunhway	Giriboy; Yunhway	3:09
4.	"Crazy Out There" (produced by Czaer)	Kid Milli; Sumin	Czaer; KREIN; Pastello; Kid Milli; Sumin	Kid Milli; Sumin	3:19
5.	"Baby Back Home" (featuring Leellamarz; produced by Czaer)	Mirani; Leellamarz	Czaer; Advanced; RYS; Kwaca; Mirani; Leellamarz	Mirani; Leellamarz	3:02
6.	"EZ" (produced by Czaer)	Jvcki Wai	Czaer; Advanced; RYS; Jvcki Wai	Jvcki Wai	2:45
7.	"Show You Can" (produced by Czaer, JAKOPS)	Maya (XG); Cocona (XG); Dayday; JAKOPS; Kickhaiku	Czaer; Advanced; RYS; JAKOPS; Dayday	Maya (XG); Cocona (XG)	3:14
8.	"Crimson" (시뻘게; produced by Czaer)	Bewhy	Czaer; Advanced; RYS; Bewhy	Bewhy	2:49
Total length:					24:21

=== Part 2 ===
Released on September 5, 2023 (Note: The second track, "Click Like", was pre-released on August 30, 2023.)
No.	Title	Lyrics	Music	Artist	Length
1.	"Smoke" (produced by Dynamic Duo, Padi)	Gaeko; Choiza; Lee Young-ji	Gaeko; Padi	Dynamic Duo; Lee Young-ji	3:29
2.	"Click Like" (featuring Paul Blanco; produced by Crush)	Crush; Paul Blanco	Crush; Paul Blanco	Crush; Paul Blanco	2:45
3.	"Swipe" (produced by C-Young, Alawn)	Y0ung (MUMW)	C-Young; Alawn; Benji Bae	Taeyong (NCT); Ten (NCT)	3:06
4.	"How to Twerk" (트윌ㅋ; produced by Czaer)	Czaer; riskypizza	Czaer; riskypizza; thesecret; Markalong; Stephen Lee; Bomi	Miyeon ((G)I-dle); Yuqi ((G)I-dle)	2:56
Total length:					12:18

=== Part 3 ===
Released on September 12, 2023
No.	Title	Lyrics	Music	Artist	Length
1.	"Heat"	Camo	Czaer; Advanced; RYS; Camo	Camo	3:14
2.	"Lost Dreams"	riskypizza; IRIS	Czaer; IRIS; riskypizza; GLOWCEAN	Jo Yu-ri	3:24
3.	"Timeless Love" (시간과 같은 안녕)	riskypizza; Baek A	Czaer; riskypizza; GLOWCEAN; Glen Choi; Kristin Marie	Kwon Jin-ah	3:21
4.	"Busterz"	riskypizza	Czaer; riskypizzai	INI	2:49
Total length:					12:48

=== Part 4 ===
Released on October 31, 2023
No.	Title	Lyrics	Music	Artist	Length
1.	"Move! (Prod. Slom)"	pH-1	Slom; pH-1	pH-1	2:48
2.	"Move! (Prod. Slom)" (Inst.)		Slom		2:48
Total length:					5:36

== Viewership ==
Street Woman Fighter 2 : South Korea viewers per episode (thousands)

Season	Episode number										Average
Season	1	2	3	4	5	6	7	8	9	10	Average
3	380	483	664	654	638	588	513	554	469	672	562

Source: Audience measurement performed nationwide by Nielsen Korea.

Average TV viewership ratings
Ep.	Original broadcast date	Average audience share (Nielsen Korea)	
Ep.	Original broadcast date	Nationwide	Seoul
1	August 22, 2023	1.529% (5th)	2.157% (4th)
2	August 29, 2023	2.168% (3rd)	3.203% (2nd)
3	September 5, 2023	2.633% (4th)	3.961% (2nd)
4	September 12, 2023	2.479% (4th)	3.754% (1st)
5	September 26, 2023	2.614% (3rd)	3.649% (1st)
6	October 3, 2023	1.933% (4th)	2.657% (3rd)
7	October 10, 2023	2.159% (3rd)	3.124% (3rd)
8	October 17, 2023	1.960% (3rd)	2.706% (3rd)
9	October 24, 2023	2.141% (3rd)	3.161% (2nd)
10	October 31, 2023	2.373% (3rd)	3.408% (2nd)
Average		2.200%	3.178%
Special 1	September 19, 2023	1.484% (4th)	1.968% (4th)
In the table above, the blue numbers represent the lowest ratings and the red numbers represent the highest ratings.; This show aired on a cable channel/pay TV which normally has a relatively smaller audience compared to free-to-air TV/public broadcasters (KBS, SBS, MBC and EBS).

== Awards and nominations ==
Name of the award ceremony, year presented, category, recipient of the award and the result of the nomination
Award	Year	Category	Recipient	Result	Ref.
Asian Academy Creative Awards	2024	Best Music or Dance Program (National Winners – Korea)	Street Woman Fighter 2	Won	
Korea First Brand Awards (Note: Hosted by the Korea Consumer Brand Committee and the Korea Consumer Forum, the Korea First Brand Awards based its winners on a nationwide South Korean survey.)	2024	Dance Survival Program	Street Woman Fighter 2	Won	
MAMA Awards	2023	Culture and Style	Cast of Street Woman Fighter 2	Won	
TVING Awards	2023	Content of the Year – Best 9	Street Woman Fighter 2	Won	

== Spin-offs ==
=== Street Dance Girls Fighter 2 ===
Following the conclusion of Street Woman Fighter 2 on October 31, Mnet officially announced that Street Dance Girls Fighter would also return for its second season on November 21, at 10 pm KST.

=== Street Woman Fighter 2: World Wide Log ===
This is an observational reality show that delves into the global lifestyle of the crews that dominated the Korean dance scene and will show the members' hidden charms. It is often abbreviated as SWF2.
