= List of Hit the Stage episodes =

This is a list of Hit the Stage episodes.

- Contestant with highest scores
- Contestant with lowest scores

== Season 1 ==
=== Episodes 1–2, Theme: Devils ===
- Contestants : Hyoyeon (Girls' Generation), Taemin (Shinee), Bora (Sistar), Hoya (Infinite), U-Kwon (Block B), Shownu (Monsta X), Momo (Twice), Ten (NCT)
Ranking

==== Results by Order of Performance ====
Order	Contestants	Judges Score* (8 total)	Audience Score (200 total)	Place
1	Ten (NCT)	6	154	4th
2	Bora (Sistar)	N/A	148	7th
3	Momo (Twice)	N/A	144	8th
4	U-Kwon (Block B)	5	158	3rd
5	Hyoyeon (Girls' Generation)	5	152	5th
6	Shownu (Monsta X)	N/A	149	6th
7	Hoya (Infinite)	N/A	159	2nd
8	Taemin (Shinee)	5	189	1st

*As stated in episode 2, Ten had the highest score with 6 votes, the other contestants received 5 votes or less from the judges.

=== Episodes 3–4, Theme: This Love ===
- Contestants : Hyoyeon (Girls' Generation), Jang Hyunseung, Hoya (Infinite), U-Kwon (Block B), Feeldog (Big Star), Momo (Twice), Ten (NCT), Chungha (I.O.I)
Ranking

==== Results by Order of Performance ====
Order	Contestants	Judges Score (10 total)	Audience Score (200 total)	Place
1	Ten (NCT)	6	135	8th
2	Jang Hyunseung	5	138	6th
3	Chungha (I.O.I)	N/A	136	7th
4	U-Kwon (Block B)	6	142	4th
5	Hyoyeon (Girls' Generation)	6	149	3rd
6	Feeldog (Big Star)	6	159	2nd
7	Momo (Twice)	5	141	5th
8	Hoya (Infinite)	7	161	1st

=== Episodes 5–6, Theme: Uniform ===
- Contestants : Stephanie, Hyoyeon (Girls' Generation), Jang Hyunseung, Bora (Sistar), Feeldog (Big Star), Shownu (Monsta X), Rocky (Astro), Ten (NCT)
Ranking

==== Results by Order of Performance ====
Order	Contestants	Judges Score (10 total)	Audience Score (200 total)	Place
1	Shownu (Monsta X)	8	151	5th
2	Rocky (Astro)	7	134	8th
3	Jang Hyunseung	6	153	3rd
4	Bora (Sistar)	10	150	6th
5	Feeldog (Big Star)	10	155	2nd
6	Hyoyeon (Girls' Generation)	7	152	4th
7	Stephanie	8	149	7th
8	Ten (NCT)	9	159	1st

=== Episodes 7–8, Theme: Crazy ===
- Contestants : Nicole, Jang Hyunseung, Bora (Sistar), U-Kwon (Block B), Seyong (Myname), Feeldog (Big Star), Mijoo (Lovelyz), Shownu (Monsta X)
Ranking

==== Results by Order of Performance ====
Order	Contestants	Judges Score (10 total)	Audience Score (200 total)	Place
1	Bora (Sistar)	N/A	135	7th
2	Mijoo (Lovelyz)	N/A	139	6th
3	Shownu (Monsta X)	N/A	160	4th
4	Nicole	9	162	3rd
5	Seyong (Myname)	N/A	130	8th
6	U-Kwon (Block B)	N/A	170	1st
7	Jang Hyunseung	N/A	159	5th
8	Feeldog (Big Star)	N/A	168	2nd

=== Episode 9, Theme: The Fight ===
- Contestants : Hyoyeon (Girls' Generation), Min (miss A), Changjo (Teen Top), Yugyeom (Got7), Bitto (UP10TION), Eunjin (DIA) & Chaeyeon (DIA & I.O.I), Ten (NCT)
Ranking

==== Results by Order of Performance ====
Order	Contestants	Judges Score (8 total)	Audience Score (200 total)	Place
1	Bitto (UP10TION)	5	N/A	4th-7th
2	Eunjin (DIA) & Chaeyeon (DIA & I.O.I)	1	N/A	4th-7th
3	Changjo (Teen Top)	6	N/A	4th-7th
4	Ten (NCT)	8	155	3rd
5	Hyoyeon (Girls' Generation)	8	162	1st
6	Min (Miss A)	8	N/A	4th-7th
7	Yugyeom (Got7)	8	159	2nd

=== Episode 10, Theme: Final ===
- Contestants : Hyoyeon (Girls' Generation), U-Kwon (Block B), Yugyeom (Got7), Shownu (Monsta X), Ten (NCT), Chungha (I.O.I)
Ranking

==== Results by Order of Performance ====
Order	Contestants	Judges Score (8 total)	Audience Score (200 total)	Place
1	Chungha (I.O.I)	7	N/A	4th-6th
2	Ten (NCT)	7	N/A	4th-6th
3	Shownu (Monsta X)	7	156	3rd
4	Yugyeom (Got7)	8	163	1st
5	U-Kwon (Block B)	7	N/A	4th-6th
6	Hyoyeon (Girls' Generation)	8	161	2nd
