= Hit the Stage =

South Korean television series

- Promotional Poster
- Hangul: 힛 더 스테이지
- RR: Hit deo seuteiji
- MR: Hit tŏ sŭt'eiji
- Genre: Reality competition; dance competition
- Presented by: Jun Hyun-moo; Lee Soo-geun
- Starring: Further information: § List of contestants
- Country of origin: South Korea
- Original language: Korean
- No. of episodes: 10 (list of episodes)

Production
- Production company: CJ Entertainment

Original release
- Network: Mnet
- Release: July 27 – September 28, 2016

Hit the Stage (Korean: 힛 더 스테이지) is a South Korean television program broadcast by Mnet in which K-pop idols team up with professional dance teams to compete in a dance survival contest. It premiered on July 27, 2016 and the first season concluded on September 28, 2016. It aired every Wednesday on Mnet and tvN at 11pm KST. The live competition is hosted by entertainers Jun Hyun-moo and Lee Soo-geun.

== List of contestants ==
Male contestants

Contestant	Group	Episodes
Taemin	Shinee	1–2
Jang Hyunseung	Soloist (formerly Beast)	3–8
Hoya	Infinite	1–4
Changjo	Teen Top	9
U-Kwon	Block B	1–4, 7–8, 10
Seyong	Myname	7–8
Feeldog	Big Star	3–8
Yugyeom	Got7	9–10
Shownu	Monsta X	1–2, 5–8, 10
Bitto	Up10tion	9
Rocky	Astro	5–6
Ten	NCT	1–6, 9–10

Female contestants

Contestant	Group	Episodes
Stephanie	Soloist (formerly The Grace)	5–6
Nicole	Soloist (Kara)	7–8
Hyoyeon	Girls' Generation	1–6, 9–10
Bora	Sistar	1–2, 5–8
Min	miss A	9
Mijoo	Lovelyz	7–8
Eunjin	DIA	9
Chaeyeon	DIA & I.O.I	9
Momo	Twice	1–4
Chungha	Soloist (I.O.I)	3–4, 10
