= Ten (EP) =

- Digital cover

EP by Ten
- Released: February 13, 2024
- Studios: SM Aube (Seoul); SM Dorii (Seoul); SM Droplet (Seoul); SM Yellow Tail (Seoul)
- Genres: Pop; pop-punk; hip-hop; Latin pop
- Length: 18:19
- Language: English
- Labels: SM; Kakao
- Producers: Mathias Neumann; Oliver Frid; Fortune; Rob Grimaldi; Elie Jay Rizk; Griff Clawson

Ten chronology
Ten (2024)	Stunner (2025)

Singles from Ten
- 1. "Nightwalker" Released: February 13, 2024

Music videos
- "Nightwalker" on YouTube "Lie With You" on YouTube

Ten is the debut extended play (EP) by Thai singer Ten. It was released on February 13, 2024, by SM Entertainment and distributed by Kakao Entertainment. The six track EP, recorded entirely in English, explores several different genres, including pop-punk, Latin pop, dance-pop, contemporary R&B, and hip-hop. The project was supported by the lead single "Nightwalker", and promoted with a concert tour of East and Southeast Asia. The EP was commercially successful, reaching the top 5 of charts in South Korea, Japan, and the United Kingdom.

== Background and release ==
Ten debuted as a member of South Korean boy band NCT in April 2016 with the release of NCT U's debut single "The 7th Sense". In January 2019, his role in NCT expanded when he joined WayV, NCT's China-based sub-unit, followed by SuperM, a K-pop supergroup, that August. Ten had previously released several solo singles, including "Dream in a Dream", "Paint Me Naked" and "Birthday" through the SM Station project, though he had yet to make his official solo debut.

In November 2023, details of Ten's future plans were included in SM Entertainment's third-quarter 2023 financial reporting documents, revealing that he was scheduled to make his official solo debut with an EP in the first quarter of 2024. In early January 2024, Ten's first fan-con tour was announced, with shows in Seoul, Bangkok, Hong Kong, and Jakarta beginning in February. On the same day, SM confirmed that Ten's EP was scheduled to be released in February but provided no further details.

The details of the project were officially announced on January 26, with SM confirming the six-track self-titled EP, sung entirely in English, would be released on February 13. The announcement was accompanied by a poster bearing the words "When the midnight comes / Pulling the strings / Beautiful monster royalty energy / I am yours", which were believed to be lyrics to an upcoming song.

Further details followed, with the name of the title track, "Nightwalker", being announced on January 30, followed by the full track listing and descriptions of each song on February 1. A music video for a shortened version of the song "Lie With You" was released on February 5, showing Ten dreaming about moments with a former lover. Two more songs were teased on February 8 in a performance video titled "10", depicting the singer dancing to "Water" and "Dangerous".

Ten was officially released on February 13, along with the lead single "Nightwalker" and its accompanying music video.

== Composition ==
Ten has been described as "genre-bending". Speaking of the EP during a press event on the day of the EP's release, Ten said ""All six tracks explore different genres. I prepared a variety of elements because I wanted to demonstrate to many people the diverse charms and talents that I possess."

The EP's lead single, "Nightwalker" is a dance track with a "pulsating" bass rhythm and "ethereal mood", with lyrics about being "irresistibly drawn to a captivating presence". "Water" is a Latin-pop track with early 2000s influence, while "Dangerous" is a pop-punk song with retro-sounding funk influences "On Ten" leans into heavy hip-hop with heavy bass and synths, while "Shadow" is R&B influenced. The EP's final song, "Lie With You", is a mid-tempo pop track about reminiscing about moments with a former lover.

== Promotion ==
To promote the EP, Ten held a showcase on the day of release at Yes24 Live Hall where he performed songs from the EP and answered questions from press. Additionally, for the last hour before the EP's release, Ten held a countdown livestream on YouTube, TikTok and Weverse where he discussed the EP and shared behind-the-scenes stories of its production.

Ten supported the EP with his first fan-con tour, visiting several cities throughout Asia. Tickets to the tour's Seoul show quickly sold out, causing a second show to be added. The tour began on February 16 in Seoul, with Ten performing all six songs from the EP, as well as his previous singles "Birthday", "Paint Me Naked", "Dream in a Dream", as well as a jazz arrangement of WayV's "Love Talk".

Additionally, Ten performed "Nightwalker" on South Korean music programs such as M Countdown, The Show, Show! Music Core, Music Bank, and Inkigayo, additionally performing "Water" on the latter three. He also appeared on It's Live and The Seasons, performing "Nightwalker" on both shows.

== Commercial performance ==
In South Korea, Ten peaked at number three on the Circle Album Chart for the week ending February 17, selling 124,404 copies. A second version of the album charted at number eight, shifting 15,000 copies. On the monthly chart, the EP peaked at number twelve for February 2024 with 139,588 copies sold, along with a second version at number 26 selling 23,746 copies. As of July 2024, the EP has sold 178,891 copies in South Korea.

In Japan, the EP debuted at number six on the Oricon Albums Chart, number ten on the Oricon Combined Albums Chart, and number five on the Billboard Japan Hot Albums chart. On the monthly Oricon chart, the EP peaked at number 30 for March 2024. As of April 2024, Ten has sold 11,850 copies in Japan. In the United Kingdom, the EP charted at number two on the Official Charts Company's UK Album Downloads Chart. All six of the EP's tracks also charted individually on the UK Singles Downloads and UK Singles Sales charts, entering at positions ranging between forty-six and fifty-six.

== Track listing ==
Ten track listing
No.	Title	Lyrics	Music	Arrangement	Length
1.	"Nightwalker"	Adam Seuba; Mathias Neumann; Nikolaj Andersen; Svante Furevi; Sebastian Axelsson; Hilda Denny	Seuba; Neumann; Andersen; Furevi; Axelsson; Denny	Neumann; Jinbyjin	3:23
2.	"Water"	Softserveboy	Oliver Frid; Liv Miraldi; Sam DeRosa; Cameron Bartolini; Alexander Pavelich; TMM	Frid	2:47
3.	"Dangerous"	Miles Barker; Jordan Anthony Dennis	Rodney Jeffrion Montreal Jr.; Barker; Dennis; Hautboi Rich; Jordain Johnson	Montreal	2:55
4.	"On Ten"	Justin Starling	Rob Grimaldi; Tima Dee; Ayzha Nyree	Grimaldi	2:43
5.	"Shadow"	Jiselle; Xydo	Elie Jay Rizk; Xydo	Rizk; Xydo	3:08
6.	"Lie with You"	Griff Clawson; Ricky Manning; Alna Hofmeyr	Clawson; Manning; Hofmeyr	Clawson	3:20
Total length:					18:19

== Charts ==
=== Weekly charts ===
Weekly chart performance for Ten
Chart (2024)	Peak position
Japanese Albums (Oricon)	6
Japanese Combined Albums (Oricon)	10
Japanese Hot Albums (Billboard Japan)	5
South Korean Albums (Circle)	3
UK Album Downloads (Official Charts)	2

=== Monthly charts ===
Monthly chart performance for Tap
Chart (2024)	Position
Japanese Albums (Oricon)	30
South Korean Albums (Circle)	12

== Release history ==
Release history and formats for Ten
Region	Date	Format	Label	Ref.
Various	February 13, 2024	Digital download; streaming; CD	SM; Kakao	
