= Ten (singer) =

Thai singer and dancer (born 1996)

- เตนล์
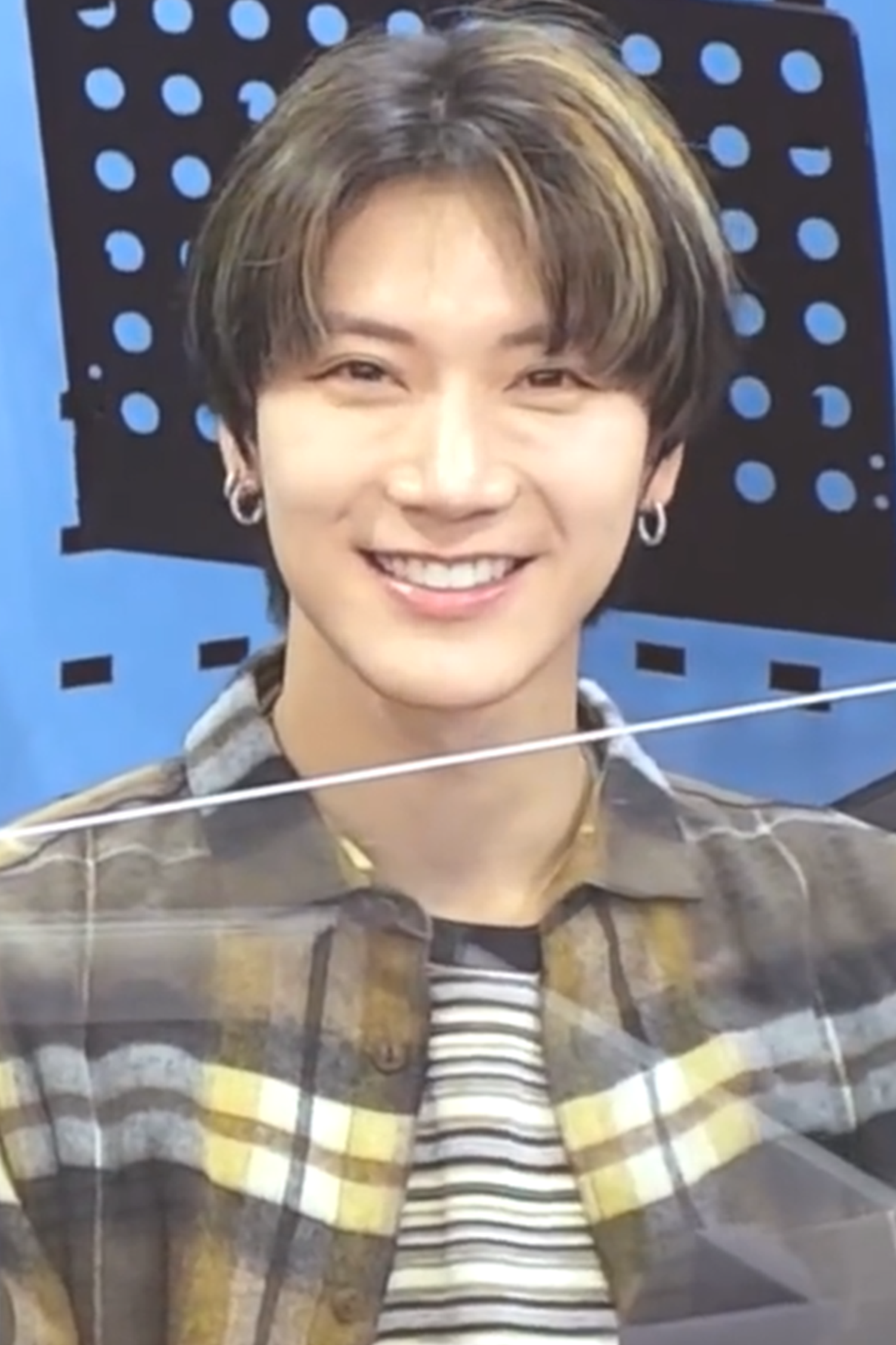
- Ten in 2020
- Born: Chittaphon Leechaiyapornkul; February 27, 1996 (age 30); Bangkok, Thailand
- Education: Shrewsbury International School
- Occupations: Singer; dancer
- Musical career
- Origin: South Korea
- Genres: K-pop; pop
- Instrument: Vocals
- Years active: 2013–present
- Labels: SM; Label V; Capitol; Illimnt
- Member of: NCT; WayV; SuperM
- Formerly of: SM Rookies

Chittaphon Leechaiyapornkul (Thai: ชิตพล ลี้ชัยพรกุล; RTGS: Chittaphon Lichaiyaphonkun; pronounced [tɕʰít.tàʔ.pʰon líː.tɕʰaj.jáʔ.pʰɔːn.kun]; born February 27, 1996), known professionally as Ten (Thai: เตนล์, Korean: 텐), is a Thai singer and dancer. He debuted with the South Korean boy band under SM Entertainment, NCT, in 2016 as part of its first sub-unit, NCT U. Since 2019, he has been active mainly as a member of NCT's China-based unit WayV and the South Korean supergroup SuperM. Ten has also released several solo singles through the SM Station project: "Dream in a Dream" (2017), "New Heroes" (2018), "Paint Me Naked" (2021), and "Birthday" (2022). He made his solo debut in February 2024 with his eponymous extended play.

== Early life ==
Ten was born in Bangkok, Thailand, on February 27, 1996. He studied at the Shrewsbury International School.

In January 2011, at the age of 14, Ten competed on the Thai show Teen Superstar, under the stage name TNT. He won and earned an opportunity to sign a contract with the South Korean agency Starship Entertainment, although his family did not allow him to go. He ultimately joined SM Entertainment in 2013 after passing an SM Global Audition in Thailand.

== Career ==
=== 2013–2015: Pre-debut activities ===
On December 24, 2013, Ten was introduced as a member of SM Rookies, a pre-debut team composed of trainees under SM Entertainment. In 2014, he and future groupmates appeared on the Mnet-produced Exo 90:2014, a show starring labelmates Exo, where they danced to K-pop songs from the '90s. He also participated in the music video remake of G.o.d's "To Mother". In July 2015, Ten and fellow trainee Jaehyun competed in the Hope Basketball All-Star with SM Town, a charity match held by Hope Basketball All-Star Organizing Committee.

=== 2016–2018: Career beginnings and debut with NCT U ===
On April 3, 2016, Ten was confirmed to debut alongside Jaehyun, Mark, Taeyong, and Doyoung as NCT U, the first sub-unit of SM Entertainment's then-upcoming boy group NCT. The rotational unit debuted with the digital single "The 7th Sense", released on April 8. It was the first release of NCT overall. Three months after his debut, Ten participated in Mnet's dance competition show Hit the Stage alongside other K-pop dancers such as Hyoyeon of Girls' Generation, Taemin of Shinee, Momo of Twice, among others. Teaming up with dance crew Prepix, he won the uniform challenge on the sixth episode. In January 2017, Ten joined the cast of SBS' program, Real Class: Elementary School Teacher, which showed foreign K-pop idols learning the Korean language from elementary students, hosted by Kang Ho-dong.

On April 7, 2017, Ten released his first solo digital single as part of SM The Performance and through season two of the SM Station project, titled "Dream in a Dream". He concluded the season with the single "New Heroes" on April 6, 2018, which he performed for the first time at the SM Town Live World Tour VI in Dubai that day. The songs peaked at number five and four on the Billboard World Digital Song Sales, respectively. "Dream in a Dream" was included in NCT's first studio album, NCT 2018 Empathy. For the album, Ten also participated in NCT U's single "Baby Don't Stop", a duet with Taeyong, and joined the rest of NCT 2018 members for the dance-focused single "Black On Black".

=== 2019–2020: Debuts with WayV and SuperM ===
On December 31, 2018, Ten was announced to join WayV, NCT's China-based unit managed by Label V, a subsidiary of SM Entertainment, alongside Kun, Winwin, Lucas, Hendery, Xiaojun, and Yangyang. The group debuted on January 17, 2019 with the digital extended play (EP) The Vision and Chinese version of NCT 127's "Regular" as its lead single.

On July 16, 2019, Food Truck Battle started its broadcast on Thailand channel PPTV with Ten as the MC. The show also had a week-late broadcast on the show's official YouTube channel. It featured both Thai and Korean celebrities such as Nam Tae-hyun, Park Ye-eun, Kitty Chicha, and James Teeradon. In August, Ten was announced to join Taemin of Shinee, Baekhyun and Kai of EXO, Taeyong and Mark of NCT 127, and Lucas as a member of SuperM, a male K-pop supergroup created by SM Entertainment and Capitol Records with activities primarily aimed at the American market. The group released their self-titled debut EP on October 4, 2019, and became the first Asian artist to rank number one on the US Billboard 200 with a debut release. They subsequently toured North America, Latin America, and Europe from November 2019 to February 2020.

In September 2020, SM Entertainment announced that all units of NCT would unite to release a two-part second full album, NCT 2020 Resonance. In the first part, Ten participated in the B-side tracks "Faded In My Last Song" as a member of NCT U and "Nectar" with WayV. In the second part, Ten was the only member to participate in both title tracks, "90's Love" and "Work It".

=== 2021–2025: Sub-unit debut and solo activities ===
In August 2021, Ten released his third solo single under the SM Station project, titled "Paint Me Naked" and debuted as part of WayV's second sub-unit named WayV-Ten & Yangyang with the single "Low Low". On October 25, Ten appeared as a special judge for the wild card round of the fourth season of the dance competition show Street Dance of China. Ten later participated in the recording of NCT's third studio album Universe, released on December 14. He appeared on four songs: "OK!" and "Round&Round" as NCT U, as well as "Miracle" with WayV and "Beautiful" with NCT 2021.

In April 2022, Ten joined Santa of Into1, Wang Feifei and Cheng Xiao as a team leader for Youku's female-centric dance competition show, Great Dance Crew. In October, Ten starred the second season of Food Truck Battle alongside groupmate Yangyang of WayV, Woodz, Janistar Phomphadungcheep, Prem Warut, and Boun Noppanut on Channel 8. He also released the R&B dance digital single "Birthday" in the same month, as part of SM Station's sub-project NCT Lab.

In December 2023, Ten was announced as one of the mentors for Chuang Asia: Thailand.

Ten made his solo debut with his eponymous extended play in February 2024, with the lead single "Nightwalker". He embarked on a fan concert tour titled 1001. On August 21, Ten was announced as one of the directors for Universe League.

In March 2025, Ten opened a promotional website for his second EP, Stunner, scheduled for a March 24 release. A pre-release English single "BAMBOLA" was released on March 17. His second EP officially released on March 24, with consists of seven-track including the title track "STUNNER". Followed by his first solo concert, 1001 Movement 'Stunner', in Seoul on April 12 and 13. On April 23, Ten digitally released his first Japanese EP, Humanity, with six tracks including the lead single "Silence" and schedule would release physically on May 28. Ten also announced his first Japan Tour, 1001 'Time Wrap', with four cities stopped which all performance schedule in May.

=== 2026–present: Independent label ===
On April 8, 2026, Ten concluded his exclusive contract with SM, departing the label while confirming that he would continue participating in group activities on a case-by-case basis. In July, he co-founded the record label Illimnt to manage his career across South Korea, Thailand, China, the United States, and other markets, and eventually branch out into creative production for other artists. To celebrate his 10th debut anniversary, he held the Ten:Core0110 concert at the Bangkok International Trade and Exhibition Centre with three sold-out shows from July 17–19, featuring Thai entertainers Nunew, Sin, UrboyTJ, Jaylerr, Pixxie, The Toys, Nont Tanont, PP Krit, and Jeff Satur as special guests. At the show, Ten previewed his first Thai-language single, "If You Don't Mean It", released on July 27, as well as the English-language single "Outwest", released on September 4 along with "IRL" and intended "as a bridge to a full album already in the works". "Outwest" is a hip-hop, tech house, and R&B track about wishing to chase unfamiliar places and new experiences.

Ten will embark on his first US showcase tour from October to November, visiting fourteen cities.

== Fashion and endorsements ==
In June 2021, Ten was approached by the direct-to-fan retailer Represent and launched a five-piece apparel collection featuring his original artworks, titled "What is ??? The Answers".

On March 7, 2024, French luxury fashion house Yves Saint Laurent appointed Ten as a brand ambassador. In May, South Korean cosmetic brand Banobagi has announced Ten as brand model in Asia. In June, Ten became brand spokesperson of Maybelline.

== Personal life ==
Ten is multilingual and speaks Thai, English, Korean, Mandarin and Japanese. In 2018, Ten received an official exemption from Thailand's mandatory military service after failing to pass the physical exam due to his past injury and knee surgery.

== Discography ==
Extended plays

- Ten (2024)
- Stunner (2025)
- Humanity (2025)

== Filmography ==
=== Television series ===
Ten's television credits
Year	Title	Role	Note	Ref.
2011	Teen Superstar	Contestant	Winner; under the stage name TNT	
2016	Hit the Stage	Contestant		
2017	Elementary School Teacher	Cast member	3rd place	
2019–2022	Food Truck Battle	Host		
2022	Great Dance Crew	Team leader		
2024	Chuang Asia: Thailand	Mentor		
2024	Universe League	Director		

=== Web series ===
Ten's web series credits
Year	Title	Role	Notes	Ref.
2023	Hwaiting	Cast member	Season 2	

== Live performances ==
=== Tours ===
- 1001 (2024)
- 1001 Movement 'Stunner' (2025)
- 1001 'Time Wrap' (2025)

=== Showcase tours ===
List of showcase tours, with dates and locations
Title	Date	Venue	City	Country	Ref.
US Showcase Tour	October 17, 2026	Moore Theatre	Seattle	United States	
US Showcase Tour	October 18, 2026	Roseland Theater	Portland	United States	
US Showcase Tour	October 21, 2026	The Regency Ballroom	San Francisco	United States	
US Showcase Tour	October 23, 2026	Humphreys Concerts by the Bay	San Diego	United States	
US Showcase Tour	October 24, 2026	The Novo	Los Angeles	United States	
US Showcase Tour	October 26, 2026	The Van Buren	Phoenix	United States	
US Showcase Tour	October 28, 2026	White Oak Music Hall	Houston	United States	
US Showcase Tour	October 29, 2026	The Bomb Factory	Dallas	United States	
US Showcase Tour	October 31, 2026	Uptown Theater	Minneapolis	United States	
US Showcase Tour	November 1, 2026	Cermak Hall	Chicago	United States	
US Showcase Tour	November 3, 2026	Buckhead Theatre	Atlanta	United States	
US Showcase Tour	November 6, 2026	Nevermore Hall	Baltimore	United States	
US Showcase Tour	November 8, 2026	Big Night Live	Boston	United States	
US Showcase Tour	November 10, 2026	Terminal 5	New York	United States	

=== Concert residencies ===
List of concert residencies, with dates, location, number of shows, and performed songs
Title	Date(s)	Venue	City	Country	Shows	Performed songs	Ref.
Ten:Core0110	January 17–19, 2026	Bangkok International Trade and Exhibition Centre	Bangkok	Thailand	3	"Nightwalker"; "On Ten"; "Birthday"; "Shadow"; "Dangerous"; "Enough for Me"; "Water"; "New Heroes"; "Butterfly"; "Lie with You"; "Waves"; "Bambola"; Sweet as Sin"; "Stunner"; "Paint Me Naked" (Note: Ten also performed collaborations with different artists at each show and premiered "If You Don't Mean It" on the last day.)	

== Awards and nominations ==
Name of the award ceremony, year presented, award category, nominee(s) of the award, and the result of the nomination
Award ceremony	Year	Category	Nominee(s)	Result	Ref.
Asia Artist Awards	2024	Best Choice – Music	Himself	Won	
Mint Magazine Awards	2023	Inspiration Award	Himself	Won	
Mnet Japan Fan's Choice Awards	2021	Male Rookie of the Year	Himself	Nominated	
Thailand Headlines Person of the Year Awards	2017	Most Popular Award	Himself	Won	
